= 2020–21 in Scottish football =

Football in Scotland
- Season: 2020–21

2020–21 in Scottish football

Premiership champions
- Rangers

Championship champions
- Heart of Midlothian

League 1 champions
- Partick Thistle

League 2 champions
- Queen's Park

Scottish Cup winners
- St Johnstone

League Cup winners
- St Johnstone

Challenge Cup winners
- Tournament cancelled

Teams in Europe
- Celtic, Rangers, Motherwell, Aberdeen

Scotland national team
- 2020–21 UEFA Nations League B UEFA Euro 2020; 2022 FIFA World Cup qualification

The 2020–21 season was the 124th season of competitive football in Scotland. The domestic season began on 1 August 2020 with the first round of matches in the 2020–21 Scottish Premiership. The start of all other domestic competitions were delayed until at least October 2020 because of the COVID-19 pandemic, and most games were played behind closed doors due to Scottish Government restrictions.

== Transfer deals ==
Due to the effects of the coronavirus pandemic on the football calendar, the summer window for transfers in Scotland ran from 14 July to 5 October. Those dates used the full 12-week period permitted by FIFA, and the governing bodies also authorised clubs outside the Premiership to make loan signings during October 2020.

== League competitions ==
=== Scottish Premiership ===
Pos	Team	Pld	W	D	L	GF	GA	GD	Pts	Qualification or relegation (Note: Teams play each other three times (33 matches), before the league is split into two groups (the top six and the bottom six).)
1	Rangers (C)	38	32	6	0	92	13	+79	102	Qualification for the Champions League third qualifying round
2	Celtic	38	22	11	5	78	29	+49	77	Qualification for the Champions League second qualifying round
3	Hibernian	38	18	9	11	48	35	+13	63	Qualification for the Europa Conference League second qualifying round
4	Aberdeen	38	15	11	12	36	38	−2	56	Qualification for the Europa Conference League second qualifying round
5	St Johnstone	38	11	12	15	36	46	−10	45	Qualification for the Europa League third qualifying round (Note: St Johnstone qualified as the 2020–21 Scottish Cup winners.)
6	Livingston	38	12	9	17	42	54	−12	45	
7	St Mirren	38	11	12	15	37	45	−8	45	
8	Motherwell	38	12	9	17	39	55	−16	45	
9	Dundee United	38	10	14	14	32	50	−18	44	
10	Ross County	38	11	6	21	35	66	−31	39	
11	Kilmarnock (R)	38	10	6	22	43	54	−11	36	Qualification for the Premiership play-off final
12	Hamilton Academical (R)	38	7	9	22	34	67	−33	30	Relegation to Championship

Rules for classification: 1) Points; 2) Goal difference; 3) Goals scored; 4) Head-to-head points; 5) Head-to-Head goal difference; 6) Play-off (only if deciding champion, UEFA competitions qualification, second stage group allocation or relegation).
(C) Champions; (R) Relegated

=== Scottish Championship ===
Pos	Team	Pld	W	D	L	GF	GA	GD	Pts	Promotion, qualification or relegation
1	Heart of Midlothian (C, P)	27	17	6	4	63	24	+39	57	Promotion to the Premiership
2	Dundee (O, P)	27	12	9	6	49	40	+9	45	Qualification for the Premiership play-off semi-final
3	Raith Rovers	27	12	7	8	45	36	+9	43	Qualification for the Premiership play-off quarter-final
4	Dunfermline Athletic	27	10	9	8	38	34	+4	39	Qualification for the Premiership play-off quarter-final
5	Inverness Caledonian Thistle	27	8	12	7	36	31	+5	36	
6	Queen of the South	27	9	5	13	38	51	−13	32	
7	Arbroath	27	7	9	11	28	34	−6	30	
8	Ayr United	27	6	11	10	31	37	−6	29	
9	Greenock Morton (O)	27	6	11	10	22	33	−11	29	Qualification for the Championship play-offs
10	Alloa Athletic (R)	27	5	7	15	30	60	−30	22	Relegation to League One

Source: SPFL
Rules for classification: 1) Points; 2) Goal difference; 3) Goals scored; 4) Head-to-to head points; 5) Head-to-head goal difference; 6) Play-off (only for deciding promotion, play-off participation and relegation).
(C) Champions; (O) Play-off winners; (P) Promoted; (R) Relegated

=== Scottish League One ===
Pos	Team	Pld	W	D	L	GF	GA	GD	Pts	Promotion, qualification or relegation
1	Partick Thistle (C, P)	22	11	7	4	40	18	+22	40	Promotion to the Championship
2	Airdrieonians	22	12	2	8	35	24	+11	38	Qualification for the Championship play-offs
3	Cove Rangers	22	10	6	6	28	18	+10	36	Qualification for the Championship play-offs
4	Montrose	22	9	6	7	33	33	0	33	Qualification for the Championship play-offs
5	Falkirk	22	9	5	8	29	26	+3	32	
6	East Fife	22	10	3	9	30	33	−3	33	
7	Peterhead	22	9	2	11	24	27	−3	29	
8	Clyde	22	8	2	12	27	38	−11	26	
9	Dumbarton (O)	22	7	4	11	14	24	−10	25	Qualification for the League One play-offs
10	Forfar Athletic (R)	22	4	5	13	18	37	−19	17	Relegation to League Two

Source: SPFL
Rules for classification: 1) Points; 2) Goal difference; 3) Goals scored; 4) Head-to-to head points; 5) Head-to-head goal difference; 6) Play-off (only for deciding promotion, play-off participation and relegation).
(C) Champions; (O) Play-off winners; (P) Promoted; (R) Relegated

=== Scottish League Two ===
Pos	Team	Pld	W	D	L	GF	GA	GD	Pts	Promotion, qualification or relegation
1	Queen's Park (C, P)	22	17	3	2	43	13	+30	54	Promotion to League One
2	Edinburgh City	22	12	2	8	40	27	+13	38	Qualification for the League One play-offs
3	Elgin City	22	12	2	8	39	28	+11	38	Qualification for the League One play-offs
4	Stranraer	22	11	5	6	36	25	+11	38	Qualification for the League One play-offs
5	Stirling Albion	22	10	6	6	32	22	+10	36	
6	Stenhousemuir	22	7	5	10	25	35	−10	26	
7	Albion Rovers	22	7	4	11	25	38	−13	25	
8	Annan Athletic	22	5	7	10	25	27	−2	22	
9	Cowdenbeath	22	5	6	11	15	32	−17	21	
10	Brechin City (R)	22	2	4	16	13	46	−33	10	Qualification for the League Two play-off final

Source: SPFL
Rules for classification: 1) Points; 2) Goal difference; 3) Goals scored; 4) Head-to-to head points; 5) Head-to-head goal difference; 6) Play-off (only for deciding promotion, play-off participation and relegation).
(C) Champions; (P) Promoted; (R) Relegated

=== Non-league football ===
==== Level 5 ====
Highland Football League
Pos	Team	Pld	Pts	PPG
1	Brora Rangers (C)	3	9	3.00
2	Fraserburgh	3	9	3.00
3	Buckie Thistle	2	6	3.00
4	Formartine United	2	6	3.00
5	Inverurie Loco Works	2	6	3.00
6	Keith	2	3	1.50
7	Rothes	2	3	1.50
8	Huntly	3	2	0.67
9	Lossiemouth	2	1	0.50
10	Deveronvale	3	1	0.33
11	Strathspey Thistle	0	0	—
12	Clachnacuddin	1	0	0.00
13	Nairn County	2	0	0.00
14	Wick Academy	2	0	0.00
15	Fort William	1	0	0.00
16	Turriff United	2	0	0.00

Source: Highland Football League BBC Sport Soccerway
(C) Champions

Lowland Football League
Pos	Team	Pld	Pts	PPG
1	Kelty Hearts (C, O, P)	13	36	2.77
2	East Kilbride	12	29	2.42
3	Bonnyrigg Rose Athletic	12	29	2.42
4	BSC Glasgow	13	30	2.31
5	East Stirlingshire	12	26	2.17
6	Gala Fairydean Rovers	12	22	1.83
7	Bo'ness United	10	18	1.80
8	The Spartans	12	18	1.50
9	University of Stirling	15	22	1.47
10	Berwick Rangers	13	16	1.23
11	Civil Service Strollers	14	17	1.21
12	Caledonian Braves	14	13	0.93
13	Gretna 2008	11	10	0.91
14	Cumbernauld Colts	14	11	0.79
15	Dalbeattie Star	10	5	0.50
16	Edinburgh University	15	5	0.33
17	Vale of Leithen	12	0	0.00

Source: SLFL BBC Sport Soccerway
(C) Champions;
(O) Play-off winners;
(P) Promoted

==== Level 6 ====
East of Scotland Football League
Pos	Team	Pld	Pts
1	Tranent Juniors	12	28
2	Jeanfield Swifts	9	23
3	Linlithgow Rose	11	22
4	Musselburgh Athletic	11	22
5	Camelon Juniors	10	20
6	Lothian Thistle Hutchison Vale	10	19
7	Penicuik Athletic	8	16
8	Dundonald Bluebell	8	16
9	Newtongrange Star	12	16
10	Broxburn Athletic	11	16
11	Sauchie Juniors	11	15
12	Hill of Beath Hawthorn	10	15
13	Tynecastle	11	14
14	Dunbar United	13	11
15	Crossgates Primrose	11	10
16	Blackburn United	12	3
17	Inverkeithing Hillfield Swifts	10	3
18	Whitehill Welfare	10	1

Source: East of Scotland Football League

South of Scotland Football League
Pos	Team	Pld	Pts
1	Stranraer reserves	11	26
2	Threave Rovers	7	18
3	St Cuthbert Wanderers	7	16
4	Newton Stewart	9	15
5	Nithsdale Wanderers	8	15
6	Abbey Vale	8	14
7	Upper Annandale	9	12
8	Wigtown & Bladnoch	8	12
9	Caledonian Braves reserves	6	10
10	Lochar Thistle	11	10
11	Lochmaben	8	6
12	Mid-Annandale	7	4
13	Heston Rovers	10	4
14	Creetown	7	4

Source: South of Scotland Football League

West of Scotland Football League
Pos	Team	Pld	Pts
1	Clydebank	7	19
2	Troon	7	16
3	Kilwinning Rangers	7	15
4	Irvine Meadow XI	7	13
5	Darvel	5	12
6	Largs Thistle	7	11
7	Blantyre Victoria	7	10
8	Hurlford United	7	10
9	Rossvale	9	9
10	Beith Juniors	5	7
11	Kirkintilloch Rob Roy	7	6
12	Bonnyton Thistle	8	6
13	Rutherglen Glencairn	6	3
14	Cumbernauld United	7	0
15	Benburb	0	0

Source: West of Scotland Football League

== Honours ==
=== Cup honours ===
The Old Firm teams (Celtic and Rangers) were eliminated from both national cup competitions before the semi-final stage, the first time this had occurred since the introduction of the Scottish League Cup 75 years earlier. St Johnstone won both tournaments, becoming the first non-Old Firm side to win a "cup double" since Aberdeen in 1989–90.

Competition	Winner	Score	Runner-up	Match report
2020–21 Scottish Cup	St Johnstone	1–0	Hibernian	BBC Sport
2020–21 League Cup	St Johnstone	1–0	Livingston	The Guardian
2020–21 Challenge Cup	Tournament cancelled			
2020–21 South Challenge Cup	Tournament cancelled at the third round stage			
2020–21 Youth Cup	Tournament cancelled			
2020–21 Junior Cup	Tournament cancelled			

=== Non-league honours ===
==== Senior ====
Level	Competition	Winner
5	Highland League	Brora Rangers
5	Lowland League	Kelty Hearts
6	East of Scotland League Premier Division	Null and void
6	South of Scotland League	Null and void
6	West of Scotland League Premier Division	Null and void
7	East of Scotland League First Division	Null and void
7	West of Scotland League Tier 7	Null and void
	North Caledonian League Division One	Golspie Sutherland
	North Caledonian League Division Two	Alness United

==== Junior ====
East Region

Division	Winner
East Region Premiership North	Null and void
East Region Premiership South	Null and void

North Region

Division	Winner
Aberdeen North	Null and void
Aberdeen South	Null and void
Banff and Buchan	Null and void
West	Null and void

=== Individual honours ===
==== PFA Scotland awards ====
Award	Winner	Team
Players' Player of the Year	James Tavernier	Rangers
Young Player of the Year	David Turnbull	Celtic
Manager of the Year	Steven Gerrard	Rangers
Championship Player of Year	Liam Boyce	Heart of Midlothian

==== SFWA awards ====
Award	Winner	Team
Footballer of the Year	Steven Davis	Rangers
Young Player of the Year	Josh Doig	Hibernian
Manager of the Year	Steven Gerrard	Rangers
International Player of the Year	John McGinn	Aston Villa

== Scottish clubs in Europe ==
=== Summary ===
Due to scheduling pressures caused by the coronavirus pandemic, qualifying rounds were played over just one tie instead of the usual two-leg format.

Club	Competitions	Started round	Final round	Coef.
Celtic	UEFA Champions League	First qualifying round	Second qualifying round	8.0
Celtic	UEFA Europa League	Third qualifying round	Group stage	8.0
Rangers	UEFA Europa League	Second qualifying round	Round of 16	19.5
Motherwell	UEFA Europa League	First qualifying round	Third qualifying round	3.0
Aberdeen	UEFA Europa League	First qualifying round	Third qualifying round	3.5
Total				34.0
Average				8.5

* Season in progress

=== Celtic ===
UEFA Champions League

Celtic entered the 2020–21 UEFA Champions League in the first qualifying round.

18 August 2020 QR1	Celtic (Scotland)	6–0	(Iceland) KR	Glasgow
19:45 BST	Elyounoussi 6', 90+1'; Adalsteinsson 17' (o.g.); Jullien 31'; Taylor 46'; Édouard 72'	BBC Sport		Stadium: Celtic Park; Attendance: None; Referee: Sebastian Gishamer (Austria)

26 August 2020 QR2	Celtic (Scotland)	1–2	(Hungary) Ferencváros	Glasgow
19:45 BST	Christie 53'	BBC Sport	Siger 7'; Nguen 75'	Stadium: Celtic Park; Attendance: None; Referee: Allard Lindhout (Netherlands)

UEFA Europa League

Having lost in the second qualifying round of the Champions League, Celtic entered the Europa League in its third round of qualifying.

Qualifying

24 September 2020 QR3	Riga (Latvia)	0–1	(Scotland) Celtic	Riga
18:00 BST		BBC Sport	Elyounoussi 90'	Stadium: Skonto Stadium; Attendance: None; Referee: Fábio Veríssimo

1 October 2020 PO	FK Sarajevo (Bosnia and Herzegovina)	0–1	(Scotland) Celtic	Zenica
19:00 BST		BBC Sport	Édouard 70'	Stadium: Bilino Polje Stadium; Attendance: None; Referee: Benoît Bastien (France)

Group stage

22 October 2020 Group H	Celtic (Scotland)	1–3	(Italy) Milan	Glasgow
20:00 BST	Elyounoussi 76'	BBC Sport	Kruniclć 14'; Brahim 42'; Hauge 90+2'	Stadium: Celtic Park; Attendance: None; Referee: Matej Jug (Slovenia)

29 October 2020 Group H	Lille (France)	2–2	(Scotland) Celtic	Villeneuve-d'Ascq
17:55 GMT	Çelik 67'; Ikoné 75'	BBC Sport	Elyounoussi 28', 32'	Stadium: Stade Pierre-Mauroy; Referee: Aleksandar Stavrev (North Macedonia)

5 November 2020 Group H	Celtic (Scotland)	1–4	(Czech Republic) Sparta Prague	Glasgow
20:00 GMT	Griffiths 65'	BBC Sport	Julis 26', 45', 76'; Krejci 90'	Stadium: Celtic Park; Attendance: None; Referee: István Kovács (Romania)

26 November 2020 Group H	Sparta Prague (Czech Republic)	4–1	(Scotland) Celtic	Prague
17:55 GMT	Hancko 26'; Juliš 38', 80'; Plavšić 90+4'	BBC Sport	Édouard 15'	Stadium: Stadion Letná; Referee: Tobias Stieler (Germany)

3 December 2020 Group H	Milan (Italy)	4–2	(Scotland) Celtic	Milan
17:55 GMT	Çalhanoğlu 24'; Castillejo 26'; Hauge 50'; Brahim 82'	BBC Sport	Rogic 7'; Édouard 14'	Stadium: San Siro; Referee: Ricardo de Burgos Bengoetxea

10 December 2020 Group H	Celtic (Scotland)	3–2	(France) Lille	Glasgow
20:00 GMT	Jullien 21'; McGregor 28' (pen.); Turnbull 75'	BBC Sport	Ikoné 24'; Weah 71'	Stadium: Celtic Park; Attendance: None; Referee: Fábio Veríssimo (Portugal)

=== Rangers ===
UEFA Europa League

Rangers entered the UEFA Europa League in the second round of qualifying.

Qualifying

17 September 2020 QR2	Lincoln Red Imps (Gibraltar)	0–5	(Scotland) Rangers	Gibraltar
16:00 BST		BBC Sport	Tavernier 21'; Goldson 45+4'; Morelos 67', 88'; Defoe 84'	Stadium: Victoria Stadium; Attendance: None; Referee: Iwan Griffith (Wales)

24 September 2020 QR3	Willem II (Netherlands)	0–4	(Scotland) Rangers	Tilburg
20:00 BST		BBC Sport	Tavernier 22' (pen.); Kent 25'; Helander 55'; Goldson 71'	Stadium: Koning Willem II Stadion; Attendance: None; Referee: Maurizio Mariani

1 October 2020 PO	Rangers (Scotland)	2–1	(Turkey) Galatasaray	Glasgow
19:45 BST	Arfield 52'; Tavernier 59'	BBC Sport	Marcão 87'	Stadium: Ibrox Stadium; Attendance: None; Referee: Andris Treimanis (Latvia)

Group stage

22 October 2020 Group D	Standard Liège (Belgium)	0–2	(Scotland) Rangers	Liège
17:55 BST		BBC Sport	Tavernier 19' (pen.); Roofe 90+2'	Stadium: Stade Maurice Dufrasne; Referee: Jakob Kehlet (Denmark)

29 October 2020 Group D	Rangers (Scotland)	1–0	(Poland) Lech Poznań	Glasgow
20:00 GMT	Morelos 68'	BBC Sport		Stadium: Ibrox Stadium; Attendance: None; Referee: Kristo Tohver (Estonia)

5 November 2020 Group D	Benfica (Portugal)	3–3	(Scotland) Rangers	Lisbon
17:55 GMT	Goldson 1' (o.g.); Silva; Núñez 90+1'	BBC Sport	Gonçalves 24' (o.g.); Kamara 25'; Morelos 51'	Stadium: Estádio da Luz; Referee: Jesús Gil Manzano (Spain)

26 November 2020 Group D	Rangers (Scotland)	2–2	(Portugal) Benfica	Glasgow
20:00 GMT	Arfield 7'; Roofe 69'	BBC Sport	Tavernier 78' (o.g.); Pizzi 81'	Stadium: Ibrox Stadium; Attendance: None; Referee: Radu Petrescu (Romania)

3 December 2020 Group D	Rangers (Scotland)	3–2	(Belgium) Standard Liège	Glasgow
20:00 GMT	Goldson 39'; Tavernier 45+1' (pen.); Arfield 63'	BBC Sport	Lestienne 6'; Cop 40'	Stadium: Ibrox Stadium; Attendance: None; Referee: Bojan Pandzic

10 December 2020 Group D	Lech Poznań (Poland)	0–2	(Scotland) Rangers	Poznań
17:55 GMT		BBC Sport	Itten 31'; Hagi 72'	Stadium: Stadion Miejski; Referee: José María Sánchez Martínez (Spain)

Knockout Stage

18 February 2021 Last 32	Antwerp (Belgium)	3–4	(Scotland) Rangers	Antwerp
20:00 GMT	Avenatti 45'; Refaelov 45+8' (pen.); Hongla 66'	BBC Sport	Aribo 38'; Barišić 59' (pen.), 90' (pen.); Kent 83'	Stadium: Bosuilstadion; Attendance: None; Referee: Georgi Kabakov

25 February 2021 Last 32	Rangers (Scotland)	5–2 (9–5 agg.)	(Belgium) Antwerp	Glasgow
17:55 GMT	Morelos 9'; Patterson 46'; Kent 55'; Barišić 79' (pen.); Itten 90+2' (pen.)	BBC Sport	Refaelov 31'; Lamkel Zé 57'	Stadium: Ibrox Stadium; Attendance: None; Referee: Pawel Raczkowski

11 March 2021 Last 16	Slavia Prague (Czech Republic)	1–1	(Scotland) Rangers	Prague
17:55 GMT	Stanciu 7'	BBC Sport	Helander 36'	Stadium: Sinobo Stadium; Attendance: None; Referee: Ovidiu Hategan (Romania)

18 March 2021 Last 16	Rangers (Scotland)	0–2 (1–3 agg.)	(Czech Republic) Slavia Prague	Glasgow
20:00 GMT		BBC Sport	Olayinka 14'; Stanciu 74'	Stadium: Ibrox Stadium; Attendance: None; Referee: Orel Grinfeld (Israel)

=== Motherwell ===
UEFA Europa League

Motherwell entered the UEFA Europa League at the first qualifying round.

27 August 2020 QR1	Motherwell (Scotland)	5–1	(Northern Ireland) Glentoran	Motherwell
19:45 BST	Lang 58'; O'Donnell 72'; Polworth 75'; Watt 78'; Long 87'	BBC Sport	McDaid 90' (pen.)	Stadium: Fir Park; Attendance: None; Referee: Bram van Driessche (Belgium)

17 September 2020 QR2	Coleraine (Northern Ireland)	2–2 (a.e.t.) (0–3 p)	(Scotland) Motherwell	Coleraine
19:30 BST	Doherty 49' (pen.), 90' (pen.)	BBC Sport	Lang 16'; Watt 37'	Stadium: The Showgrounds; Attendance: None; Referee: Antti Munukka (Finland)
	Penalties
	Parkhill (penalty missed); Kane (penalty missed); McConaghie (penalty missed)		(penalty scored) O'Hara; (penalty scored) Watt; (penalty scored) O'Donnell

24 September 2020 QR3	Hapoel Be'er Sheva (Israel)	3–0	(Scotland) Motherwell	Jerusalem
18:30 BST	Vitor 43'; Josué 71' (pen.); Acolatse 82'	BBC Sport		Stadium: Teddy Stadium; Attendance: None; Referee: Serhiy Boyko (Ukraine)

=== Aberdeen ===
UEFA Europa League

Aberdeen entered the UEFA Europa League in the first qualifying round as fourth-place finishers in the 2019–20 Scottish Premiership, as the 2019–20 Scottish Cup was not completed by the UEFA deadline.

27 August 2020 QR1	Aberdeen (Scotland)	6–0	(Faroe Islands) NSÍ Runavík	Aberdeen
19:45 BST	Ferguson 36'; Main 42'; Hedges 50', 59', 87' (pen.); Hayes 63'	BBC Report		Stadium: Pittodrie Stadium; Attendance: None; Referee: Ivar Orri Kristjansson (Iceland)

17 September 2020 QR2	Viking (Norway)	0–2	(Scotland) Aberdeen	Stavanger
19:30 BST		BBC Sport	McCrorie 44'; Hedges 78'	Stadium: Viking Stadion; Attendance: None; Referee: Filip Glova (Slovakia)

24 September 2020 QR3	Sporting CP (Portugal)	1–0	(Scotland) Aberdeen	Lisbon
20:00 BST	Tomás 7'	BBC Sport		Stadium: Estádio José Alvalade; Attendance: None; Referee: Nikola Dabanovic (Montenegro)

== Scotland national team ==
The Scotland national team qualified for their first major tournament in over two decades (since the 1998 World Cup) by winning through the Euro 2020 play-offs, defeating Israel and Serbia in penalty shootouts.

4 September 2020 2020–21 Nations League B	Scotland	1–1	Israel	Glasgow
	Christie 45' (pen.)	Report	Zahavi 73'	Stadium: Hampden Park; Attendance: None; Referee: Slavko Vinčić (Slovenia)

7 September 2020 2020–21 Nations League B	Czech Republic	1–2	Scotland	Olomouc
	Pešek 11'	Report	Dykes 27'; Christie 52' (pen.)	Stadium: Andrův stadion Attendance: None; Referee: Serdar Gözübüyük (Netherlands)

8 October 2020 Euro 2020 play-offs	Scotland	0–0 (a.e.t.) (5–3 p)	Israel	Glasgow
		Report		Stadium: Hampden Park; Attendance: None; Referee: Ovidiu Hategan (Romania)
	Penalties
	McGinn (penalty scored); McGregor (penalty scored); McTominay (penalty scored); Shankland (penalty scored); McLean (penalty scored)		(penalty missed) Zahavi; (penalty scored) Bitton; (penalty scored) Weissman; (penalty scored) Abu Fani

11 October 2020 2020–21 Nations League B	Scotland	1–0	Slovakia	Glasgow
	Dykes 54'	Report		Stadium: Hampden Park; Attendance: None; Referee: Davide Massa (Italy)

14 October 2020 2020–21 Nations League B	Scotland	1–0	Czech Republic	Glasgow
	Fraser 6'	Report		Stadium: Hampden Park; Attendance: None; Referee: Felix Zwayer (Germany)

12 November 2020 Euro 2020 play-offs	Serbia	1–1 (a.e.t.) (4–5 p)	Scotland	Belgrade
	Jovic 90'	Report	Christie 52'	Stadium: Red Star Stadium; Attendance: None; Referee: Antonio Miguel Mateu Lahoz (Spain)
	Penalties
	Tadic (penalty scored); Jovic (penalty scored); Gudelj (penalty scored); Katai (penalty scored); Mitrovic (penalty missed)		(penalty scored) Griffiths; (penalty scored) McGregor; (penalty scored) McTominay; (penalty scored) McBurnie; (penalty scored) McLean

15 November 2020 2020–21 Nations League B	Slovakia	1–0	Scotland	Trnava
	Gregus 31'	Report		Stadium: Anton Malatinský Stadium; Attendance: None; Referee: István Kovács (Romania)

18 November 2020 2020–21 Nations League B	Israel	1–0	Scotland	Netanya
	Solomon 44'	Report		Stadium: Netanya Stadium; Attendance: None; Referee: Pawel Raczkowski (Poland)

25 March 2021 World Cup qualification	Scotland	2–2	Austria	Glasgow
	Hanley 71'; McGinn 85'	Report	Kalajdzic 55', 80'	Stadium: Hampden Park; Attendance: None; Referee: Carlos del Cerro Grande (Spain)

28 March 2021 World Cup qualification	Israel	1–1	Scotland	Tel Aviv
	Peretz 44'	Report	Fraser 56'	Stadium: Bloomfield Stadium; Attendance: 5,000; Referee: Deniz Aytekin (Germany)

31 March 2021 World Cup qualification	Scotland	4–0	Faroe Islands	Glasgow
	McGinn 7', 53'; Adams 60'; Fraser 70'	Report		Stadium: Hampden Park; Attendance: None; Referee: Trustin Farrugia Cann (Malta)

2 June 2021 Friendly	Netherlands	2–2	Scotland	Faro, Portugal
	Depay 17', 89'	Report	Hendry 10'; Nisbet 63'	Stadium: Estádio Algarve; Attendance: None; Referee: Vitor Ferreira

6 June 2021 Friendly	Luxembourg	0–1	Scotland	Luxembourg
		Report	Adams 27'	Stadium: Stade Josy Barthel; Referee: Eldorjan Hamiti

14 June 2021 Euro 2020	Scotland	0–2	Czech Republic	Glasgow
		Report	Schick 42', 52'	Stadium: Hampden Park; Attendance: 9,847; Referee: Daniel Siebert (Germany)

18 June 2021 Euro 2020	England	0–0	Scotland	London
		Report		Stadium: Wembley Stadium; Attendance: 20,306; Referee: Antonio Miguel Mateu Lahoz (Spain)

22 June 2021 Euro 2020	Croatia	3–1	Scotland	Glasgow
	Vlašić 17'; Modrić 62'; Perišić 77'	Report	McGregor 42'	Stadium: Hampden Park; Attendance: 9,896; Referee: Fernando Rapallini (Argentina)

== Women's football ==
Due to the coronavirus pandemic, the 2020 women's season was declared null and void in July 2020.

A new season (2020–21) started in October 2020 and ended in July 2021; Scottish Women's Football thus returned to the autumn–spring calendar for the first time since 2008–09.

=== League and Cup honours ===
Division	Winner
2020 SWPL 1/2	Null and void
2020 SWF Championship (North/South)	Null and void
2020–21 SWPL 1	Glasgow City
2020–21 SWPL 2	Aberdeen
2020–21 SWF Championship (North)	Null and void
2020–21 SWF Championship (South)	Null and void

Competition	Winner	Score	Runner-up	Match report
Scottish Women's Cup	Not contested in 2020 or 2020–21			
Scottish Women's Premier League Cup	2020 edition cancelled at the quarter-final stage; not contested in 2020–21			
SWF Championship Cup	2020 edition cancelled at the quarter-final stage; not contested in 2020–21			
2020 Scottish Women's Football League Cup	Cancelled at the group stage			

=== Individual honours ===
==== SWPL awards ====
Award	Winner	Team
Players' Player of the Year		
Player of the Year		
Manager of the Year		
Young Player of the Year		

=== Scottish Women's Premier League ===
SWPL 1

Pos	Team	Pld	W	D	L	GF	GA	GD	Pts	Qualification or relegation
1	Glasgow City (C)	21	18	2	1	77	16	+61	56	Qualification for the Champions League first round
2	Celtic	21	17	2	2	76	12	+64	53	Qualification for the Champions League first round
3	Rangers	21	16	0	5	76	10	+66	48	
4	Hibernian	21	9	2	10	42	27	+15	29	
5	Spartans	21	9	2	10	29	42	−13	29	
6	Motherwell	21	4	0	17	18	78	−60	12	
7	Forfar Farmington	21	3	2	16	17	90	−73	11	Withdrew from SWPL after season
8	Heart of Midlothian	21	2	2	17	9	69	−60	8	

Rules for classification: 1) Points; 2) Goal difference; 3) Number of goals scored
(C) Champions

SWPL 2

=== UEFA Women's Champions League ===
==== Glasgow City ====
Glasgow City entered the 2020–21 UEFA Women's Champions League in the first qualifying round.

4 November 2020 QR1	Glasgow City (Scotland)	0–0 (a.e.t.) (6–5 p)	(Republic of Ireland) Peamount United	Cumbernauld
		BBC Sport		Stadium: Broadwood Stadium
	Penalties
	Ross (penalty scored); Howat (penalty scored); Crichton (penalty scored); Fulton (penalty scored); Love (penalty missed); McLauchlan (penalty scored); Wyne (penalty scored)		(penalty scored) Lynch; (penalty scored) McEvoy; (penalty missed) O'Gorman; (penalty scored) Ryan-Doyle; (penalty scored) Duggan; (penalty scored) Walsh; (penalty missed) O'Callaghan

18 November 2020 QR2	Valur (Iceland)	1–1 (a.e.t.) (3–4 p)	(Scotland) Glasgow City	Reykjavík
	Edvardsdottir 80'	BBC Sport	Crichton 51'	Stadium: Hlíðarendi
	Penalties
	Jónsdóttir (penalty missed); Gísladóttir (penalty missed); Jensen (penalty scored); Eiríksdóttir (penalty scored); Halldórsdóttir (penalty scored); Eiríksdóttir (penalty missed)		(penalty scored) Crichton; (penalty missed) Fulton; (penalty missed) Love; (penalty scored) Wade; (penalty scored) Shine; (penalty scored) Wyne

9 December 2020 Last 32	Sparta Prague (Czech Republic)	2–1	(Scotland) Glasgow City	Chomutov
14:00 GMT	Martínková 34'; Dlasková 41'	BBC Sport	Wojcik 51'	Stadium: Letní Stadion; Referee: Eszter Urban (Hungary)

16 December 2020 Last 32	Glasgow City (Scotland)	0–1 (1–3 agg.)	(Czech Republic) Sparta Prague	Cumbernauld
19:00 GMT		BBC Sport	Martínková 7'	Stadium: Broadwood Stadium; Referee: Silvia Domingos (Portugal)

=== Scotland women's national team ===
23 October 2020 Euro 2021 qualifying	Scotland	3–0	Albania	Edinburgh
19:30 BST	Corsie 37'; Weir 76', 90' (pen.)	BBC Sport		Stadium: Tynecastle Park; Attendance: None; Referee: Graziella Pirriatore (Italy)

27 October 2020 Euro 2021 qualifying	Finland	1–0	Scotland	Helsinki
16:15 GMT	Summanen 49'	BBC Sport		Stadium: Bolt Arena; Referee: Esther Staubli (Switzerland)

27 November 2020 Euro 2021 qualifying	Portugal	1–0	Scotland	Lisbon
19:00 GMT	Borges 69'	BBC Sport		Stadium: Estádio do Restelo; Referee: Ivana Martinčić (Croatia)

1 December 2020 Euro 2021 qualifying	Scotland	0–1	Finland	Edinburgh
19:30 GMT		BBC Sport	Rantanen 90+5'	Stadium: Easter Road; Attendance: None; Referee: Katalin Kulcsár (Hungary)

19 February 2021 Euro 2021 qualifying	Cyprus	0–10	Scotland	Larnaca
13:00 GMT		BBC Sport	Cuthbert 10', 34'; Thomas 22', 71'; Weir 25'; Hanson 29'; Arnot 57'; Emslie 64'; Ross 69' (pen.), 73'	Stadium: AEK Arena; Referee: Riem Hussein (Germany)

23 February 2021 Euro 2021 qualifying	Scotland	0–2	Portugal	Larnaca
		BBC Sport	Capeta; Pinto	Stadium: Antonis Papadopoulos Stadium

10 June 2021 Friendly	Northern Ireland	0–1	Scotland	Belfast
19:00 BST		BBC Sport	Weir 78' (pen.)	Stadium: Seaview

15 June 2021 Friendly	Wales	0–1	Scotland	Llanelli
19:15 BST		BBC Sport	Cuthbert 59'	Stadium: Parc y Scarlets; Referee: Louise Thompson

== Deaths ==
- 13 July: Pat Quinn, 84, Albion Rovers, Motherwell, Hibernian, East Fife and Scotland forward; East Fife manager.
- c.13 July: Eddie Beaton, 88, Greenock Morton, Berwick Rangers, Stranraer and Dumbarton forward.
- 21 July: Hugh McLaughlin, 75, St Mirren, Third Lanark and Queen of the South midfielder.
- 24 July: David Hagen, 47, Rangers, Hearts, Falkirk, Livingston, Clyde and Peterhead midfielder.
- 4 August: Willie Hunter, 80, Motherwell, Hibernian and Scotland forward; Queen of the South and Inverness Caledonian manager.
- 13 August: Jackie Wren, 84, Hibernian, Stirling Albion and Berwick Rangers goalkeeper.
- 14 August: Tom Forsyth, 71, Motherwell, Rangers and Scotland defender; Dunfermline Athletic manager.
- 24 August: Pat McCluskey, 68, Celtic, Dumbarton, Airdrieonians and Queen of the South defender and midfielder.
- September: Archie Irvine, 74, Airdrieonians midfielder.
- 19 October: Jim Townsend, 75, Heart of Midlothian, St Johnstone and Greenock Morton midfielder.
- 23 October: Ebbe Skovdahl, 75, Aberdeen manager.
- 24 October: Kevin McCarra, 62, journalist.
- 31 October: Marius Žaliūkas, 36, Heart of Midlothian and Rangers defender.
- 4 November: Matt Tees, 81, Airdrieonians forward.
- 15 November: Campbell Forsyth, 86, St Mirren, Kilmarnock and Scotland goalkeeper.
- 3 December: Bobby Wishart, 87, Aberdeen, Dundee, Airdrie and Raith Rovers forward.
- 12 December: John McSeveney, 89, Hamilton Academical winger.
- December: Joe Frickleton, East Stirlingshire wing half.
- 24 December: Davie Sneddon, 84, Dundee, Kilmarnock and Raith Rovers inside forward; Kilmarnock and Stranraer manager.
- 26 December: Chic McLelland, 63, Aberdeen, Motherwell, Dundee and Montrose defender; Montrose manager.
- 26 December: Jim McLean, 83, Hamilton Academical, Clyde, Dundee and Kilmarnock inside forward; Dundee United manager and chairman.
- 31 December: Tommy Docherty, 92, Celtic and Scotland right half; Scotland manager.
- 24 January: Jóhannes Eðvaldsson, 70, Celtic and Motherwell defender.
- 24 January: Barrie Mitchell, 73, Dunfermline Athletic, Aberdeen and Morton forward.
- 26 January: Jozef Vengloš, 84, Celtic manager.
- 28 January: Eddie Connachan, 85, Dunfermline Athletic, Falkirk and Scotland goalkeeper.
- January: John Grant, 89, Hibernian, Raith Rovers and Scotland defender.
- 6 February: Columb McKinley, 70, Airdrie and Dumbarton half-back.
- 22 February: Jack Bolton, 79, Raith Rovers, Morton and Dumbarton defender.
- 2 March: Ian St John, 82, Motherwell and Scotland forward; Motherwell manager.
- 3 March: Willie Whigham, 81, Albion Rovers, Falkirk and Dumbarton goalkeeper.
- 6 March: Jimmy Stevenson, 74, Hibernian wing half.
- 7 March: Alastair Alexander, 83, BBC Scotland football commentator.
- 20 March: Peter Lorimer, 74, Scotland midfielder.
- 27 March: Alex Kiddie, 93, Aberdeen, Falkirk, Arbroath, Brechin City, Montrose and Forfar Athletic winger.
- 24 April: Walter Borthwick, 73, Morton, East Fife, St Mirren, St Johnstone and Dunfermline midfielder; Arbroath manager.
- 29 April: Frank Brogan, 78, Celtic winger.
- 7 May: John Sludden, 56, Celtic, St Johnstone, Airdrieonians, Ayr United, Kilmarnock, East Fife, Clydebank, Clyde and Stenhousemuir forward; Bo'ness United, Camelon Juniors and East Stirlingshire manager.
- 3 June: Alan Miller, 51, St Johnstone goalkeeper.
