= 2022–23 Scottish Women's Football Championship =

Football competition

Scottish Women's Football Championship
- Season: 2022–23
- Champions: Livingston
- Promoted: Livingston

The 2022–23 Scottish Women's Football Championship was the second completed season of the SWF Championship as the third-tier division of women's football in Scotland. Due to league restructuring by Scottish Women's Football (SWF) after the 2021–22 season, a national eight-club Championship division was formed and, one level below, a new fourth tier, Scottish Women's Football League One, with 12 clubs (initially 14; two withdrew). The Scottish women's league last had four national divisions from 1999 to 2004.

Most of the competing clubs moved from the previous season's North and South divisions. Twelve of the initial 14 clubs who entered the new League One were effectively relegated in 2022, by being moved from the third level to the fourth. The regional Scottish Women's Football League was demoted to level 5. The SWFL's most successful club in recent years, Bishopton, joined League One for 2022–23, but withdrew before the season kicked off, as did Buchan Ladies.

Two clubs were to be promoted from League One in 2022–23, and none relegated from the Championship. Each division's season kicked off on 14 August 2022. The season was scheduled to finish on 16 April 2023 in the Championship, but the final match was played on 23 May 2023.

== Overview ==
In the 2021–22 Championship, three of the 26 entrant clubs won promotion to SWPL 2 (Montrose, Gartcairn and East Fife). Four clubs withdrew during the 2021–22 season: United Glasgow, Dunfermline Athletic (moved to SWFL), Stonehaven (moved to SWFL), and Clyde Ladies FC folded in protest when Clyde F.C. re-signed David Goodwillie, who was found guilty of rape by a civil court in 2017.

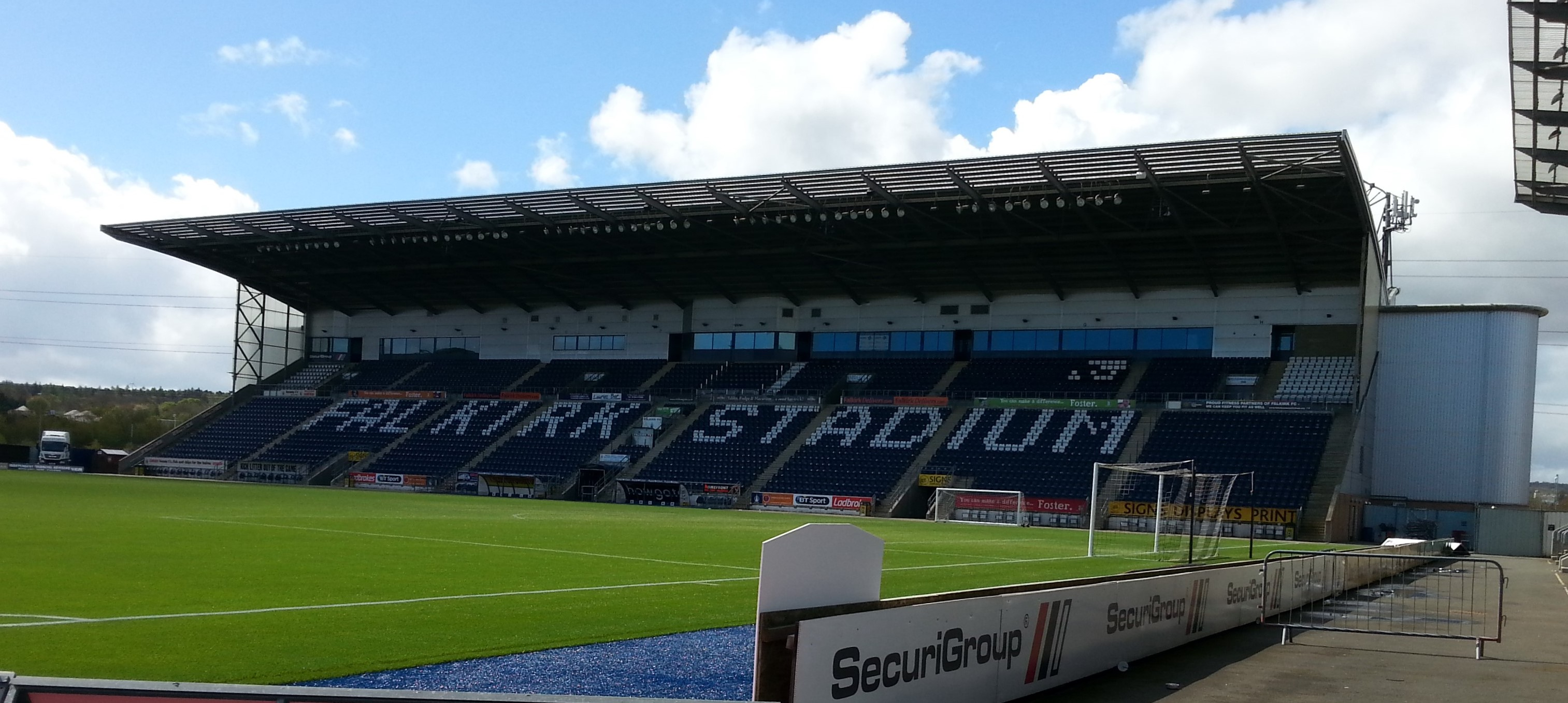
The Falkirk Stadium, home ground of Falkirk FC Women

The 2022–23 Championship had two clubs from the former Championship North and six from the South. In 2022–23 League One initially had four clubs from the North and eight from the South. Two clubs joined League One from outwith the Championship: Bishopton (from the SWFL) and Giffnock SC Women (founded in 1995 as a youth football club). In July 2022, Bishopton and Buchan were withdrawn from League One before the division's fixture list was published. Buchan were a former Championship North club, from Maud, Aberdeenshire.

The Championship clubs played against each other four times, totalling 28 matches per side, starting on 14 August 2022 and ending on 30 April 2023. The division then split into short Promotion and relegation groups of four teams, each playing each other once more (i.e. 3 rounds of matches).

League One was scheduled to play a double round-robin of the 12 clubs, each team playing 22 matches, concluding on 26 March 2023, followed by a divisional "split" in League One, and an extra round-robin: "the league will split after teams have played each other home and away into a top six and bottom six for one remaining round". The late change of format was necessitated by the withdrawal of Bishopton and Buchan from League One.

The nationalised format was devised by SWF in reaction to the growth of women's football and to professionalise the sport. Clubs are admitted to the third and fourth tiers based on meeting criteria related to player welfare. The Scottish women's league last had four national divisions from 1999 to 2004: the Premier Division/Premier League, the SWFL First Division, Second Division, and Third Division. CEO Aileen Campbell of SWF said the Championship would be "an exciting and competitive contest among eight teams from right across Scotland".

== Teams ==
=== Championship ===
Team	Location	Home ground	2021–22 position
Ayr United	Alloway	Cambusdoon Sports Club	9th (South)
Dryburgh Athletic	Dundee	Lochee Park	3rd (North)
Hutchison Vale	Edinburgh	WHEC Education Centre	6th (South)
Inverness Caledonian Thistle	Inverness	Millburn Academy	4th (North)
Livingston	Blackburn	New Murrayfield Park	5th (South)
Morton	Greenock	Cappielow	7th (South)
Rossvale	Glasgow	Huntershill Recreation Centre	2nd (South)
Renfrew	Renfrew	New Western Park	3rd (South)

=== League One ===
Team	Location	Home ground	2021–22 position
Airdrie	Airdrie	Excelsior Stadium	12th (South)
BSC Glasgow	Clydebank	Clydebank Community Sport Hub	14th (South)
Dundee City West	Dundee	Charlotte Street Pitches	8th (North)
Edinburgh Caledonia	Edinburgh	Peffermill 3G	10th (South)
Edinburgh City	Edinburgh	Ainslie Park	4th (South)
Falkirk	Falkirk	Falkirk Stadium	8th (South)
Giffnock	Giffnock	Eastwood Park	
Grampian	Aberdeen	Cults Academy	6th (North)
Gleniffer Thistle	Paisley	Ralston Community Sports Centre	15th (South)
St Mirren	Linwood	Mossedge Football Pitch	13th (South)
Stenhousemuir	Stenhousemuir	Ochilview Park	11th (South)
Westdyke	Westhill	Lawsondale Pitches	7th (North)

Withdrawn clubs (League One):

Team	Location	Details	Ref
Buchan	Maud	Withdrew before 2022–23 season	
Bishopton	Bishopton	Withdrew before 2022–23 season	

== League table (Championship) ==
=== Regular season ===
Pos	Team	Pld	W	D	L	GF	GA	GD	Pts	Qualification or relegation
1	Livingston	28	21	5	2	80	31	+49	68	Qualification for the Promotion Group
2	Renfrew	28	19	3	6	68	45	+23	60	Qualification for the Promotion Group
3	Rossvale	28	18	3	7	72	43	+29	57	Qualification for the Promotion Group
4	Ayr United	28	14	3	11	60	51	+9	45	Qualification for the Promotion Group
5	Inverness Caledonian Thistle	28	11	3	14	65	70	−5	36	Qualification for the Relegation Group
6	Dryburgh Athletic	28	7	5	16	44	60	−16	26	Qualification for the Relegation Group
7	Morton	28	4	4	20	30	79	−49	16	Qualification for the Relegation Group
8	Hutchison Vale	28	5	0	23	42	82	−40	15	Qualification for the Relegation Group

Rules for classification: 1) Points; 2) Goal difference; 3) Number of goals scored

=== Promotion Group ===
Pos	Team	Pld	W	D	L	GF	GA	GD	Pts	Qualification or relegation
1	Livingston (C, P)	31	22	6	3	85	36	+49	72	Promotion to SWPL 2
2	Rossvale	31	21	3	7	80	44	+36	66	Qualification for the SWPL 2 Play-off Final
3	Renfrew	31	19	4	8	72	54	+18	61	
4	Ayr United	31	15	3	13	63	56	+7	48	

Updated to match(es) played on 21 May 2023. Source:
Rules for classification: 1) Points; 2) Goal difference; 3) Number of goals scored
(C) Champions; (P) Promoted

=== Relegation Group ===
- Note: It was agreed at the start of the season that no relegation would take place with the league due to expand to 10 teams, but a mini-group of this nature was still played.

Pos	Team	Pld	W	D	L	GF	GA	GD	Pts
5	Inverness Caledonian Thistle	31	14	3	14	75	74	+1	45
6	Dryburgh Athletic	31	9	5	17	51	64	−13	32
7	Hutchison Vale	31	6	0	25	47	91	−44	18
8	Morton	31	4	4	23	35	89	−54	16

Updated to match(es) played on 21 May 2023. Source:
Rules for classification: 1) Points; 2) Goal difference; 3) Number of goals scored
