= List of women's football clubs in Scotland =

This article lists the women's association football clubs in Scotland, organised by league and division. All women's leagues in Scotland are part of a pyramid structure administered by Scottish Women's Football, with the Scottish Women's Premier League at the top. The pyramid consists of five levels, ranging from the national top-flight divisions to regional leagues across the country.

== League pyramid ==
All women's leagues in Scotland are part of a pyramid structure, with the Scottish Women's Premier League being at the top. Leagues become more regional at the bottom.

Clubs are allowed numerous teams in the Leagues, however, no club can be permitted to have more than one team in each of the top two divisions. More than one team from the same club can, however, compete in the 2nd divisions.

The Women's football in Scotland pyramid has 5 steps in it. They are:

Level	League(s)/Division(s)				
	National Leagues				
1	Scottish Women's Premier League 1; 10 clubs playing 18 games - 1 relegation				
2	Scottish Women's Premier League 2; 10 clubs playing 18 games - 1 promotion, 1 relegations				
3	Scottish Women's Championship; 12 clubs playing 27 games - 1 promotion, 1 relegation				
4	Scottish Women's League One; 12 clubs playing 27 games - 1 promotion, 1 relegation				
	Regional Leagues				
5	Scottish Women's Football League				
5	SWFL North 10 clubs playing 18 games ↑ 1 promotion playoff spot	SWFL East 10 clubs playing 18 games ↑ 1 promotion playoff spot	SWFL South 9 clubs playing 16 games ↑ 1 promotion playoff spot	SWFL West 10 clubs playing 18 games ↑ 1 promotion playoff spot	SWFL Central 10 clubs playing 18 games ↑ 1 promotion playoff spot
–	Highlands and Islands League 8 clubs playing 14 games				

== Scottish Women's Premier League ==
The teams below are competing in the Scottish Women's Premier League in the 2024 season:

=== SWPL1 ===
- Aberdeen
- Celtic
- Glasgow City
- Hamilton Academical
- Hearts
- Hibernian
- Montrose
- Motherwell
- Partick Thistle
- Rangers

=== SWPL2 ===
- Boroughmuir Thistle
- Dundee United
- East Fife
- Gartcairn
- Kilmarnock
- Livingston
- Queen's Park
- Spartans
- St Johnstone
- Stirling University

== Scottish Women's Football Championship ==
The teams below are competing in the Scottish Women's Football Championship in the 2024 season:

=== Scottish Women's Championship ===
- Dryburgh Athletic
- East Fife
- Falkirk
- Forfar Farmington
- Glasgow Women
- Hutchison Vale
- Inverness Caledonian Thistle
- Morton
- Renfrew
- Stenhousemuir
- Stirling University
- Westdyke

=== Scottish Women's League One ===
- Airdrie United
- Armadale Thistle
- Bonnyrigg Rose
- Dundee West
- Dunipace
- Edinburgh Caledonia
- Giffnock Soccer Centre
- Inverurie Locomotive Works
- Kilwinning
- Queen of the South
- St Mirren

== Scottish Women's Football League ==
The teams below are competing in the Scottish Women's Football League in the 2024 season:

=== North ===
- Aberdeen FCL
- Arbroath
- Buchan Ladies
- Dyce
- Elgin City
- Grampian
- Huntly
- Ross County
- Stonehaven
- Westdyke Thistle

=== West ===
- Benburb
- Bishopton
- Clydebank
- Drumchapel United
- Dumbarton
- Gleniffer Thistle
- Harmony Row
- Rossvale Development
- St Anthony's
- West Park United

=== Central ===
- Alloa Athletic
- Bayside
- Carron Huskies
- Central
- Cumbernauld Colts
- Cumbernauld United
- Dunfermline Athletic
- Glasgow GW Academy
- Linlithgow Rose
- Murieston United

=== East ===
- Blairgowrie & Rattray
- Danderhall Miners
- Dryburgh Athletic
- East Fife Development
- Edinburgh South
- Edinburgh Uni Thistle
- Glenrothes Strollers
- McDermid Ladies
- Musselburgh Windsor
- Penicuik Athletic

=== South ===
- Annan Athletic
- Ardrossan Winton Rovers
- Cambusdoon
- Cumnock Juniors
- Dalbeattie Star
- Giffnock SC Development
- Gretna 2008
- Newton Stewart
- Stewarton Annick

== See also ==
- Women's football (soccer)
- List of women's national football teams
- List of women's football teams
- List of women's football (soccer) competitions.
