= 2022–23 Scottish Women's Premier League 2 =

Scottish Women's Premier League 2
- Season: 2022–23
- Champions: Montrose
- Promoted: Montrose
- Matches played: 96
- Goals scored: 334 (3.48 per match)
- Biggest home win: Boroughmuir Thistle 7–0 Gartcairn (5 March 2023)
- Biggest away win: Stirling University 0–5 Montrose (23 April 2023); East Fife 1–6 Montrose (30 April 2023)
- Highest scoring: Boroughmuir Thistle 3–5 Kilmarnock (7 August 2022); Montrose 7–1 St Johnstone (18 January 2023)
- All statistics correct as of 30 April 2023.

The 2022–23 Scottish Women's Premier League 2 was the eighth season of the SWPL 2 as the second-highest division of women's football in Scotland, below SWPL 1 and above the SWF Championship. In February 2022, a majority of SWPL clubs voted to leave the Scottish Women's Football association (under the auspices of the Scottish Football Association); from 2022–23 onwards, the two divisions will be administered by the Scottish Professional Football League. Montrose, Gartcairn and East Fife had won promotion to SWPL 2 as the top three clubs in the SWF Championship in 2021–22.

Eight clubs took part, playing each other four times. The winners would gain automatic promotion and the 12th-placed club in SWPL 1 would be relegated, with promotion/relegation play-offs taking place between the clubs finishing 11th in SWPL 1 and 2nd in SWPL 2, and between the clubs finishing 7th in SWPL 2 and 2nd in the SWF Championship.

Montrose won the SWPL 2 and secured a second consecutive promotion. Gartcairn almost did likewise, but were defeated in the playoff by Hamilton Academical. At the bottom of the table, East Fife were relegated to be replaced by Livingston, but Stirling University survived by defeating Rossvale in the playoff.

== Teams ==
Team	Location	Manager	Home ground	Capacity	2021–22 position
Boroughmuir Thistle	Edinburgh	(Scotland) Suzy Shepherd	Meadowbank Stadium	1,320 (500 seated)	3rd
East Fife	Methil	(Scotland) Liz Anderson	Bayview Stadium	1,980	2nd (Championship North)
Gartcairn	Airdrie	(Scotland) Robert McCallum	MTC Park	300	1st (Championship South)
Kilmarnock	Kilmarnock	(Scotland) Jim Chapman	Rugby Park	15,003	4th
Montrose	Montrose	(Scotland) Craig Feroz	Links Park	4,936	1st (Championship North)
Queen's Park	Glasgow	(Scotland) Mark Kirk	New Tinto Park	1,000	6th
St Johnstone	Perth	(Scotland) Murdo Steven	Riverside Stadium	1,000	5th
Stirling University	Stirling	(Scotland) Nile Robbins	University of Stirling	1,000	7th

Locations of teams in the SWPL 2

== League table ==
Pos	Team	Pld	W	D	L	GF	GA	GD	Pts	Qualification or relegation
1	Montrose (C, P)	24	17	4	3	75	25	+50	55	Promotion to SWPL1
2	Gartcairn	24	13	3	8	46	42	+4	42	Qualification for the promotion play-off
3	St Johnstone	24	11	6	7	34	35	−1	39	
4	Kilmarnock	24	10	7	7	34	25	+9	37	
5	Boroughmuir Thistle	24	9	8	7	53	38	+15	35	
6	Queen's Park	24	10	2	12	41	42	−1	32	
7	Stirling University	24	4	6	14	28	65	−37	18	Qualification for the SWPL2 relegation/promotion play-off
8	East Fife	24	1	6	17	23	62	−39	9	Relegation to SWF Championship

Updated to match(es) played on 30 April 2023. Source:
Rules for classification: 1) Points; 2) Goal difference; 3) Number of goals scored
(C) Champions; (P) Promoted

Home \ Away	BOR	EFI	GAR	KIL	MON	QPA	STJ	STI	BOR	EFI	GAR	KIL	MON	QPA	STJ	STI
Boroughmuir Thistle		0–0	2–2	3–5	3–2	3–1	1–1	1–1		1–0	7–0	1–2		2–3		5–1
East Fife	2–2		0–2	0–1	0–4	1–1	0–1	3–3			1–4	1–3	1–6	2–1	1–3	
Gartcairn	1–3	4–1		1–0	3–2	2–1	1–0	2–2		5–2		2–1	1–4	2–3	1–3	
Kilmarnock	1–0	2–1	2–3		1–1	1–2	3–1	1–1	4–2		0–0		0–1	0–1		0–0
Montrose	0–3	5–1	2–0	1–1		5–2	2–0	5–0	3–3	5–1		3–1			7–1	4–1
Queen's Park	2–1	2–1	2–1	0–2	0–1		2–1	3–4	2–2		1–2		2–3		1–2	3–0
St Johnstone	3–2	1–1	1–3	0–0		2–1		3–2	1–1	2–1		0–0	0–0	1–0		3–2
Stirling University	1–4	2–0	0–3	0–3	0–4	1–5	1–3		0–1	2–2	2–1		0–5		2–1	

Updated to match(es) played on 30 April 2023. Source:
Legend: Blue = home team win; Yellow = draw; Red = away team win.
