= Craig Feroz =

Scottish footballer (born 1979)

Personal information
- Full name: Craig Feroz
- Date of birth: 24 October 1977 (age 49)
- Place of birth: Aberdeen, Scotland
- Position: Forward

Team information
- Current team: Montrose Women (manager)

Senior career*
Years	Team	Apps	(Gls)
1994–1998	Brechin	66	(11)
1998-2000	Livingston	20	(1)
2000	→ Stranraer (loan)	2	(0)
2000	→ Ross County (loan)	4	(0)
2000–2002	Stirling Albion	30	(5)
2001	→ Queen of the South (loan)	8	(1)
2001–2002	→ Berwick Rangers (loan)	22	(4)
2002–2003	Arbroath	23	(3)
2003–2005	Bathgate Thistle		
2005–2008	Auchinleck Talbot		
2008–2009	Glenafton		
2009–2011	Kirkintilloch Rob Roy		
2011–2013	Kilbirnie		

Managerial career
- 2020–: Montrose Women
- * Club domestic league appearances and goals

Craig Feroz (born 24 October 1977) is a Scottish former footballer who played as a forward for Brechin and Livingston.

== Career ==
=== Brechin and Livingston ===
Feroz began his career at Brechin where he notched 11 goals in 66 appearances and began to catch the eye of other clubs. It was big spending Livingston who won his signature in 1998. He was part of the Livi side that won the 1998–99 Scottish Second Division and knocked Scottish Premier League giants Aberdeen out of the 1998–99 Scottish Cup in the third round.

The forward found it difficult to get game time at Livi, and went out on loan in search of regular football. He had spells at Stranraer and Ross County but struggled to find the minutes on the pitch that he was hoping for.

=== Stirling Albion ===
In 2000, Feroz was brought to Stirling Albion by his former manager at Livi, Ray Stewart. He repaid his manager's faith in him immediately by scoring an equalising goal on his debut in a 2-2 draw against Clydebank on 5 August 2000.

Once again, Feroz went out on loan in search of regular playing time. He had short spells at Queen of the South and Berwick Rangers.

=== Arbroath and juniors ===
Feroz signed for Arbroath in 2002, making 23 appearances and scoring 3 goals during his time at Gayfield Park.

In 2003, Feroz moved into the junior leagues and had spells at Bathgate Thistle, Auchinleck Talbot, Glenafton, Kirkintilloch Rob Roy and Kilbirnie before retiring from playing in 2013.

== Coaching career ==
Feroz was appointed manager of Montrose Women in 2020 and guided them to the Scottish Women's Football Championship North in the 2021–22 season. They were promoted again to the Scottish Women's Premier League in 2023 and comfortably maintained their place in the top tier in 2023–24.

== Honours ==
=== Player ===
Livingston

- Scottish Football League Second Division : 1998–99

=== Manager ===
Montrose Women

- Scottish Women's Football Championship North : 2021–22
- Scottish Women's Premier League 2: 2022–23
