= 2021–22 Scottish Women's Football Championship =

Football competition

Scottish Women's Football Championship
- Season: 2021–22
- Champions: Montrose (North); Gartcairn (South)

The 2021–22 Scottish Women's Football Championship was the inaugural season of the SWF Championship after its formation as the third tier of women's football in Scotland.

The previous two planned seasons in 2020 and 2020–21 were both abandoned due to the coronavirus pandemic.

The league was split into two divisions – Championship North and Championship South. Planned to have 'approximately 12 teams each', the divisions in the inaugural season actually contained 9 and 17 teams respectively.

Montrose secured the Championship North title on 10 April, with a 4–1 win over their promotion rivals East Fife. In the Championship South, Gartcairn finished as the division winners on 24 April, ahead of 2nd-placed Rossvale. East Fife won the third available promotion place to SWPL 2, by winning the single-match promotion play-off 3–1 against Rossvale on 8 May in Alloa.

== Teams ==
=== Championship North ===
| Team | Location | Home ground | 2019 position |
|---|---|---|---|
| Buchan | Maud | Maud Pleasure Park | 4th |
| Drybrugh Athletic | Dundee | Lochee Park | 2nd in SWFL2 North/East |
| Dundee West | Dundee | Charlotte Street Pitches | 1st in SWFL2 North/East |
| East Fife | Leven | King George V Park | 6th |
| Grampian | Aberdeen | Cults Academy | |
| Inverness Caledonian Thistle | Inverness | Millburn Academy | 2nd |
| Montrose | Montrose | Links Park | 7th |
| Stonehaven | Stonehaven | Mineralwell Park | 11th |
| Westdyke | Westhill | Lawsondale Pitches | 9th |

Notes

1. Note 1: Finishing position in SWFL1 North unless otherwise stated.
2. Note 2: The previous two seasons in 2020 and 2020–21 were both abandoned due to the coronavirus pandemic.

=== Championship South ===
| Team | Location | Home ground | 2019 position |
|---|---|---|---|
| Airdrie | Airdrie | Excelsior Stadium | 4th in SWFL2 South East/Central |
| Ayr United | Alloway | Cambusdoon Sports Club | 11th |
| BSC Glasgow | Clydebank | Clydebank Community Sport Hub | 5th in in SWFL2 West/Central |
| Clyde | Cumbernauld | Broadwood Astro | 3rd in in SWFL2 West/Central |
| Edinburgh Caledonia | Edinburgh | Peffermill 3G | 1st in SWFL2 South East/Central |
| Edinburgh City | Edinburgh | Ainslie Park | |
| Falkirk | Falkirk | Falkirk Stadium | 10th in SWFL2 South East/Central |
| Gartcairn | Airdrie | MTC Park | |
| St Mirren | Paisley | Ralston Community Sports Centre | |
| Hutchison Vale | Edinburgh | WHEC Education Centre | |
| Livingston | Blackburn | New Murrayfield Park | 9th |
| Morton | Greenock | Cappielow | 1st in in SWFL2 West/South West |
| Renfrew | Renfrew | New Western Park | 7th |
| Rossvale | Glasgow | Huntershill Recreation Centre | |
| Gleniffer Thistle | Paisley | Ferguslie Sports Centre | 4th in SWFL2 West/Central |
| Stenhousemuir | Stenhousemuir | Ochilview Park | 5th in SWFL2 South East/Central |
| United Glasgow | Glasgow | Garscube Sports Complex | 2nd in SWFL2 West/Central |

Notes

1. Note 3: Finishing position in SWFL1 South unless otherwise stated.
2. Note 4: The previous two seasons in 2020 and 2020–21 were both abandoned due to the coronavirus pandemic.

== SWPL play-offs ==
For the first time, a system of promotion/relegation play-offs was introduced to the SWPL. The two runners-up from Championship North and Championship South were intended to take part in play-off semi-finals, with the winner playing the team finishing eighth in SWPL 2 in the play-off final to determine the last place in the 2022–23 SWPL 2. Instead, East Fife won promotion in a single promotion play-off, and no club was relegated from SWPL 2, due to expansion of the SWPL in 2022.
