= 2023–24 Scottish Women's Football Championship =

Football competition

Scottish Women's Football Championship
- Season: 2023–24
- Champions: Rossvale
- Promoted: Rossvale; Ayr United

The 2023–24 Scottish Women's Football Championship was the third completed season of the SWF Championship as the third-tier division of women's football in Scotland.

The format was set to be similar to the 2022–23 season, other than the 'split' into promotion and relegation groups occurring after two round-robins rather than four the previous season, with the number of teams having increased to 10 - the split would be after 18 rounds. The situation was complicated by the mid-season withdrawal of Edinburgh City due to their parent men's club enduring financial problems; their results were voided, and the split took place after only 16 valid rounds, and the promotion group only comprising four clubs.

A national fourth tier, Scottish Women's Football League One, was also played under the same format with 10 teams taking part.

== Overview ==
Having narrowly missed out on promotion in 2022–23 with a loss to Stirling University in the play-off, Rossvale won the Championship to secure automatic promotion to SWPL 2 for the 2024–25 season (Stirling University were the automatically relegated team coming down to replace them). Rossvale had also won the SWF Championship and League One Cup so completed a 'double'. Ayr United finished runners-up to take part in the play-off against Glasgow Women, which they won 4–3 to secure promotion.

Due to the complications from Edinburgh City's withdrawal and the intention to again increase the membership of the Championship for the following season, it was confirmed that no team would be relegated, with Hutchison Vale retaining their place in the division despite having lost all their matches, including nine by margins into double-figures. Three clubs – champions Stenhousemuir plus Forfar Farmington and Falkirk – were promoted from League One.

== Teams ==
=== Championship ===
Team	Location	Home ground	2022–23 position
Ayr United	Alloway	Cambusdoon Sports Club	4th
Dryburgh Athletic	Dundee	Lochee Park	6th
East Fife	Methil	Bayview Stadium	8th (SWPL 2)
Edinburgh City (withdrew)	Edinburgh	Ainslie Park	1st (League One)
Hutchison Vale	Edinburgh	WHEC Education Centre	7th
Inverness Caledonian Thistle	Inverness	Millburn Academy	5th
Morton	Greenock	Cappielow	8th
Rossvale	Glasgow	Huntershill Recreation Centre	2nd
Renfrew	Renfrew	New Western Park	3rd
Westdyke	Westhill	Lawsondale Pitches	2nd (League One)

=== League One ===
Team	Location	Home ground
Airdrie	Airdrie	Excelsior Stadium
Bonnyrigg Rose	Bonnyrigg	New Dundas Park
BSC Glasgow (withdrew)	Clydebank	Clydebank Community Sport Hub
Dundee West	Dundee	Charlotte Street Pitches
Edinburgh Caledonia	Edinburgh	Peffermill 3G
Falkirk	Falkirk	Falkirk Stadium
Forfar Farmington	Forfar	Station Park
Giffnock	Giffnock	Eastwood Park
Queen of the South	Dumfries	Palmerston Park
St Mirren	Linwood	Mossedge Football Pitch
Stenhousemuir	Stenhousemuir	Ochilview Park

== League table (Championship) ==
=== Regular season ===
Pos	Team	Pld	W	D	L	GF	GA	GD	Pts	Qualification or relegation
1	Rossvale	16	15	0	1	78	15	+63	45	Qualification for the Promotion Group
2	Ayr United	16	12	1	3	56	21	+35	37	Qualification for the Promotion Group
3	East Fife	16	11	0	5	59	26	+33	33	Qualification for the Promotion Group
4	Inverness Caledonian Thistle	16	8	1	7	60	32	+28	25	Qualification for the Promotion Group
5	Renfrew	16	7	3	6	47	29	+18	24	Qualification for the Relegation Group
6	Dryburgh Athletic	16	6	2	8	29	30	−1	20	Qualification for the Relegation Group
7	Westdyke	16	6	2	8	46	53	−7	20	Qualification for the Relegation Group
8	Morton	16	2	1	13	20	66	−46	7	Qualification for the Relegation Group
9	Hutchison Vale	16	0	0	16	7	130	−123	0	Qualification for the Relegation Group
10	Edinburgh City (withdrew)	0	0	0	0	0	0	0	0	

Rules for classification: 1) Points; 2) Goal difference; 3) Number of goals scored

=== Promotion Group ===
Pos	Team	Pld	W	D	L	GF	GA	GD	Pts	Qualification or relegation
1	Rossvale (C, P)	19	16	1	2	86	22	+64	49	Promotion to SWPL 2
2	Ayr United (O, P)	19	15	1	3	66	25	+41	46	Qualification for the SWPL2 Play-off Final
3	East Fife	19	12	1	6	66	33	+33	37	
4	Inverness Caledonian Thistle	19	8	1	10	64	43	+21	25	

Updated to match(es) played on 20 May 2024. Source:
Rules for classification: 1) Points; 2) Goal difference; 3) Number of goals scored
(C) Champions; (O) Play-off winners; (P) Promoted

=== Relegation Group ===
- Note: It was agreed mid-season that no relegation would take place with the league due to expand to 12 teams, but a mini-group of this nature was still played.

Pos	Team	Pld	W	D	L	GF	GA	GD	Pts
5	Dryburgh Athletic	20	10	2	8	42	30	+12	32
6	Renfrew	19	8	3	8	59	36	+23	27
7	Westdyke	19	8	2	9	60	58	+2	26
8	Morton	19	3	1	15	24	74	−50	10
9	Hutchison Vale	19	0	0	19	8	154	−146	0

Updated to match(es) played on 20 May 2024. Source:
Rules for classification: 1) Points; 2) Goal difference; 3) Number of goals scored
