= 2020–21 Scottish Women's Football Championship =

The 2020–21 Scottish Women's Football Championship was to be the inaugural season of the Scottish Women's Football Championship after its formation as the third tier of women's football in Scotland, after the originally planned Northern Hemisphere Summer 2020 season was abandoned due to the coronavirus pandemic.

Following delays in restarting the season in 2021, the SWFA decided on 29 April 2021 to declare the Championship season null and void after three fixtures, to focus on preparing for the 2021–22 season.

The league was to be split into two divisions - Championship North with 12 teams and Championship South with 14 teams.

== Teams ==
=== Championship North ===
Team	Location	Home ground	2019 position
Buchan	Maud	Maud Pleasure Park	4th
Cove Rangers	Aberdeen	Balmoral Stadium	3rd
Drybrugh Athletic	Dundee	Lochee Park	2nd in SWFL2 North/East
Dundee West	Dundee	Charlotte Street Pitches	1st in SWFL2 North/East
Dunfermline Athletic	Rosyth	The Fleet Grounds	5th
East Fife	Leven	King George V Park	6th
Grampian	Aberdeen	Cults Academy	
Inverness Caledonian Thistle	Inverness	Millburn Academy	2nd
Kelty Hearts	Kelty	New Central Park	8th
Montrose	Montrose	Links Park	7th
Stonehaven	Stonehaven	Mineralwell Park	11th
Westdyke	Westhill	Lawsondale Pitches	9th

Notes

1. Note 1: Finishing position in SWFL1 North unless otherwise stated.

=== Championship South ===
Team	Location	Home ground	2019 position
Airdrie	Airdrie	Excelsior Stadium	4th in SWFL2 South East/Central
Ayr United	Alloway	Cambusdoon Sports Club	11th
BSC Glasgow	Clydebank	Clydebank Community Sport Hub	5th in in SWFL2 West/Central
Clyde	Cumbernauld	Broadwood Astro	3rd in in SWFL2 West/Central
Edinburgh Caledonia	Edinburgh	Peffermill 3G	1st in SWFL2 South East/Central
Edinburgh City	Edinburgh	Ainslie Park	
Falkirk	Falkirk	Falkirk Stadium	10th in SWFL2 South East/Central
Gartcairn	Airdrie	MTC Park	
Livingston	Blackburn	New Murrayfield Park	9th
Morton	Greenock	Cappielow	1st in in SWFL2 West/South West
Renfrew	Renfrew	New Western Park	7th
St Mirren	Paisley	Ferguslie Sports Centre	4th in SWFL2 West/Central
Stenhousemuir	Stenhousemuir	Ochilview Park	5th in SWFL2 South East/Central
United Glasgow	Glasgow	Garscube Sports Complex	2nd in SWFL2 West/Central

Notes

1. Note 2: Finishing position in SWFL1 South unless otherwise stated.

== Championship North ==
Championship North
- Season: 2020–21
- Matches played: 12
- Goals scored: 70 (5.83 per match)
- Biggest home win: Dunfermline Athletic 8–1 Stonehaven (18 October 2020)
- Biggest away win: Stonehaven 0–4 Drybrugh Athletic (25 October 2020)
- Highest scoring: Dunfermline Athletic 8–1 Stonehaven (18 October 2020); Montrose 6–3 Dunfermline Athletic (25 October 2020)
- All statistics correct as of 1 November 2020.

=== League table ===
The following shows the standings at the point the season was declared null and void on 29 April 2021.

Pos	Team	Pld	W	D	L	GF	GA	GD	Pts	Qualification or relegation
1	Montrose	3	3	0	0	15	6	+9	9	Promotion to SWPL 2
2	Inverness Caledonian Thistle	2	2	0	0	10	3	+7	6	Qualification for the play-offs
3	Drybrugh Athletic	2	2	0	0	7	2	+5	6	
4	Dundee West	3	2	0	1	7	7	0	6	
5	Dunfermline Athletic	2	1	0	1	11	7	+4	3	
6	East Fife	2	1	0	1	5	4	+1	3	
7	Buchan	3	1	0	2	7	11	−4	3	
8	Grampian	1	0	0	1	0	3	−3	0	
9	Westdyke	3	0	0	3	4	11	−7	0	
10	Stonehaven	3	0	0	3	4	16	−12	0	
11	Cove Rangers	0	0	0	0	0	0	0	0	Withdrawn
12	Kelty Hearts	0	0	0	0	0	0	0	0	Withdrawn

Updated to match(es) played on 1 November 2020. Source:
Rules for classification: 1) Points; 2) Goal difference; 3) Number of goals scored

=== Results ===
Home \ Away	BUC	COV	DRY	DWE	DNF	EFI	GRA	ICT	KEL	MON	STO	WST
Buchan										2–5		
Cove Rangers												
Drybrugh Athletic												
Dundee West							3–0					
Dunfermline Athletic											8–1	
East Fife				4–0								
Grampian												
Inverness Caledonian Thistle	5–2											5–1
Kelty Hearts												
Montrose					6–3	4–1						
Stonehaven			0–4	3–4								
Westdyke	1–3		2–3									

Updated to match(es) played on 1 November 2020. Source:
Legend: Blue = home team win; Yellow = draw; Red = away team win.

== Championship South ==
The following shows the standings at the point the season was declared null and void on 29 April 2021.

Championship South
- Season: 2020
- Matches played: 0
- Goals scored: 0

=== League table ===
Pos	Team	Pld	W	D	L	GF	GA	GD	Pts	Qualification or relegation
1	Airdrie	0	0	0	0	0	0	0	0	Promotion to SWPL 2
2	Ayr United	0	0	0	0	0	0	0	0	Qualification for the play-offs
3	BSC Glasgow	0	0	0	0	0	0	0	0	
4	Clyde	0	0	0	0	0	0	0	0	
5	Edinburgh Caledonia	0	0	0	0	0	0	0	0	
6	Edinburgh City	0	0	0	0	0	0	0	0	
7	Falkirk	0	0	0	0	0	0	0	0	
8	Gartcairn	0	0	0	0	0	0	0	0	
9	Livingston	0	0	0	0	0	0	0	0	
10	Morton	0	0	0	0	0	0	0	0	
11	Renfrew	0	0	0	0	0	0	0	0	
12	St Mirren	0	0	0	0	0	0	0	0	
13	Stenhousemuir	0	0	0	0	0	0	0	0	
14	United Glasgow	0	0	0	0	0	0	0	0	

First match(es) will be played: 15 November 2020. Source:
Rules for classification: 1) Points; 2) Goal difference; 3) Number of goals scored

=== Results ===
Home \ Away	AIR	AYR	BSC	CLY	ECA	ECI	FAL	GAR	LIV	MOR	REN	STM	STE	UNG
Airdrie														
Ayr United														
BSC Glasgow														
Clyde														
Edinburgh Caledonia														
Edinburgh City														
Falkirk														
Gartcairn														
Livingston														
Morton														
Renfrew														
St Mirren														
Stenhousemuir														
United Glasgow														

First match(es) will be played: 15 November 2020. Source:
Legend: Blue = home team win; Yellow = draw; Red = away team win.

== SWPL play-offs ==
For the first time, a system of promotion/relegation play-offs was to be introduced to the SWPL. The two runners-up from Championship North and Championship South would have taken part in the play-off semi-finals with the winner playing the team finishing eighth in SWPL 2 in the final for the last place in the 2021–22 Scottish Women's Premier League.
