= Kilwinning Sports Club L.F.C. =

Kilwinning SC Ladies
- Full name: Kilwinning Sports Club Ladies Football Club
- Founded: 2009
- Dissolved: 2014
- Ground: Kilwinning Sports Club
- League: Scottish Women's First Division
- 2013: Scottish Women's Premier League, 12th

Kilwinning Sports Club L.F.C. were a Scottish women's football club affiliated to Kilwinning Sports Club based in Kilwinning, North Ayrshire. They were founded in 2009, but were dissolved in 2014. The club spent one season in the Scottish Women's Premier League in 2013 after securing back-to-back promotions in 2011 and 2012.

== History ==
The club spent 2010 and 2011 in the Scottish Women's Second Division West, winning the league title in 2011. A fourth-place finish in the Scottish Women's First Division in 2012 was enough to seal promotion to the SWPL, which included a club record 17-0 victory against Raith Rovers on the last day of the season. As two reserves teams of SWPL clubs occupied the top two league positions at the end of the season it meant Buchan (3rd) and Kilwinning (4th) were promoted instead. Reserve teams are ineligible for promotion to the top division if their parent club already compete in the top division.

Ahead of their debut season in the SWPL, Kilwinning announced the high profile transfer of Scotland international Julie Fleeting in March 2013 from English champions Arsenal. Kilwinning were Fleeting's hometown club. After a disappointing debut season in the SWPL, which saw Fleeting depart for Celtic in July, Kilwinning finished bottom of the table and were relegated back to the First Division. Kilwinning had fielded a second team in the Scottish Women's Second Division West for the 2013 season.

Relegation ultimately led to a mass exodus of players. Kilwinning also struggled to find a permanent replacement for Craig Hamilton who quit as manager following relegation. After struggling to rebuild in time for the 2014 season the plug was pulled after the club withdrew from their opening day league fixture against Aberdeen Reserves after failing to field a team. Kilwinning did confirm that the Kilwinning Sports Club Girls Football Academy set up would continue.

== Achievements ==
- Scottish Women's Second Division West Winners (1): 2011
- Scottish Women's First Division Promotion (1): 2012

== Awards ==
- SWF Fair Play Award (1): 2011
- PFA Scotland Second Division Player of the Year (1): Samantha McManus (2011)
- PSL First Division Player of the Month (1): Helen MacLeod (August 2012)

== Competition Record ==
League
Division	Season	Pl	Pts	Pos	Ref
SWFL Second Division West	2010	16	21	6th / 9	
SWFL Second Division West	2011	18	52	1st / 10	
SWFL First Division	2012	22	40	4th / 12	
Scottish Women's Premier League	2013	21	10	12th / 12	
Total		77	123		

Cup
Competition	2010	2011	2012	2013	Ref
Scottish Women's Cup	R1		R2	QF	
SWPL Cup	Did Not Compete			R1	
SWFL Cup	R2	R2	Not Held		
SWFL First Division Cup	Not Held		QF	DNC	
