= SWF Championship and League One Cup =

- Organiser(s): Scottish Women's Football
- Founded: 2020
- Region: Scotland
- Teams: 26
- Current champions: Bonnyrigg Rose (2025/26)
- Website: SWF

The Scottish Women's Football Championship and League One Cup, also known as the ScottishPower National League Cup, is an annual knockout competition in Scottish women's football, for teams playing in the SWF Championship and League One, the third- and fourth-tier leagues below the two-division SWPL.

Established as part of a reorganisation of the lower leagues in late 2019 and intended to be the early-season cup for a spring-summer-autumn fixture calendar, its first edition in 2020 was played up to the quarter-final stage before being cancelled due to the COVID-19 pandemic in Scotland. The fixture calendar was moved to an autumn-winter-spring schedule to accommodate for restrictions of the pandemic, but even a truncated 2020–21 SWF Championship campaign had to be cancelled and no cup was played. The 2021 Championship Cup therefore coincided with the early part of the 2021–22 SWF Championship season. Its final was played at the Falkirk Stadium on 28 November 2021. Up to that point it was known as the Championship Cup, with that level arranged into North and South sections; prior to the 2022–23 season the format of the league was amended to have a single Championship group above a League One, with the cup including all teams from both divisions and renamed accordingly; its next winners in December 2022, FC Edinburgh, a name used by Edinburgh City for two seasons, were members of the lower tier.

ScottishPower became title sponsors of the cup in 2024 as part of a sponsorship package of all four senior SWF cup competitions, after which it became known as the ScottishPower National League Cup.

As the cup for third-tier clubs, the competition is the equivalent of the Scottish Women's Football League First Division Cup which was first competed for in the 1970s and continued until 2019. However, the Scottish Women's Football League continued after the reorganisation (albeit as a standalone 'Recreational' level separate from the SWPL and Championship at the 'Performance' level) and has its own SWFL League Cup which continues the history of that trophy, with the SWF Championship Cup being a new tournament.

== Winners ==
Year	Winner	Result	Runner up	Ref
2021–22	Dryburgh Athletic	1–0	Montrose	
2022–23	FC Edinburgh	0–0 (Note: After extra time; FC Edinburgh won 5–4 in penalty shootout.)	Dryburgh Athletic	
2023–24	Rossvale	1–0 (Note: After extra time)	Dryburgh Athletic	
2024-25	Stirling University	4-2	Renfrew Ladies	

== See also ==
- Scottish Women's Cup
- Scottish Women's Premier League Cup
- Scottish Women's Football League Cup
- Scottish Challenge Cup (men's equivalent)
