= Scottish Women's Football League Cup =

Cup competition in Scottish women's football

The Scottish Women's Football League Cup, previously known as the Scottish Women's League Cup and Scottish Women's Football League First Division Cup, is a Scottish women's football competition founded in 1972. It is open only to teams in the Scottish Women's Football League (SWFL). It was the top-level league cup until 2002.

The SWFL Cup is played at present as the ScottishPower Regional League Cup, the league cup of level 5 clubs in the SWFL, now a standalone amateur league tier. Teams at levels 1 and 2 now play for the SWPL Cup and levels 3 and 4 play for the SWF Championship and League One Cup, following a reorganisation of the system in 2019.

== Background ==
The trophy started out as the Scottish Women's League Cup. The competition began in the 1972–73 season along with the foundation of the Scottish Women's League. Westthorn United won the first edition of the competition, as part of a treble along with the Scottish Women's League and Scottish Women's Cup.

High street store Sports Connection became the first official sponsor of the Scottish Women's League and Scottish Women's League Cup in 1997. Premier Division clubs broke away to form a new top division, the Scottish Women's Premier League (SWPL), before the 2002–03 season. The Scottish Women's Premier League Cup, a competition only open to SWPL teams was also introduced. With the top division in Scotland now having its own exclusive League Cup competition, the existing competition became the equivalent to the men's Scottish Challenge Cup, only open to lower league clubs.

In 2012, Scottish Women's Football launched separate cup competitions for its First and Second Division teams, and the top trophy became exclusively for teams in the First Division, the national second league tier (which became the third tier in 2016, below SWPL 2). From 2009, women's football in Scotland adopted a summer season running from March to November each year.

Following the 2019 reorganisation, the SWFL First and Second Divisions ceased to exist as they had. A new equivalent knockout tournament for the new Championship, the SWF Championship Cup, was introduced. The older trophy became the Scottish Women's Football League Cup, open to clubs playing at that 'Recreational' level. The 2021 competition was played as a straight knockout cup, won by Bishopton, but the 2022 cup had a group phase. From this, the top teams qualified for the knockout stage, while eliminated clubs competed for the SWFL Plate.

== SWFL Second Division Cup ==
The Scottish Women's Football League Second Division Cup was played from 2012 to 2019, and was only open to teams in the four groups of the Scottish Women's Football League Second Division (Central, East, North and West). Representing level 3 (2012–2015) and then level 4 (2016–2019), it was the league cup for the lowest tier at that time in the women's football league system.

The tournament consisted of six rounds, including the final. All matches were played over only one leg. With between 40 and 50 teams entering, only some teams took part in the first round. The winners met the remainder in the second round, a standard last-32 knockout.

The league reconstruction in 2020 introduced a new SWF Championship division (and cup), along similar lines to the SWFL First Division, while the teams below formed a standalone 'Recreational' setup, continuing the SWFL name and the format of regional groups. The First Division Cup again became the SWFL League Cup, but with no second tier below the new SWFL groups, the Second Division Cup was discontinued.

ScottishPower became title sponsor of the SWFL Cup and Plate in 2024, along with the Championship and League One Cup and the Highlands and Islands League Cup.

== List of winners ==
The Scottish Women's League Cup competition began in season 1972–73.

=== 1972 to 2002 ===
From 1972 to 2002, the cup was a competition open to all league clubs.

Note: Details incomplete

Season	Winner	Runner Up	Result	Ref
1972	Westthorn United	Dundee Strikers	16–0	
1976–77	Edinburgh Dynamos	Westthorn United		
1977–78	Edinburgh Dynamos	Vale of Clyde	5–2	
1981–82	Whitehill			
1982–83	Whitehill	Wishaw	4–3	
1983–84				
1984–85	Wishaw			
1990–91	Inveralmond Ladies	Dundee United	4–2	
1991–92	Inveralmond Ladies	Aberdeen	3–1	
1992–93	Hutchison Vale	Clyde	3–2	
1993–94	Clyde	Cumbernauld Ladies	6–1	
1994–95	Hutchison Vale	Cumbernauld Ladies	3–1	
1995–96	Cove Rangers	Giuliano's	4–0	
1996–97	Cumbernauld United	Clyde	6–0	
1997–98	Cumbernauld United	Clyde	6–1	
1998–99	Cumbernauld United	Clyde	5–0	
1999–00	Cumbernauld United or Aberdeen			
2000–01	Cumbernauld United	Aberdeen	3–1	
2001–02	Kilmarnock	Ayr United	2–0	

=== 2002 to 2011 ===
From 2002 to 2011, the cup was open to all league clubs below the Premier League, i.e. in the SWFL First Division, Second Division and (initially) Third Division.

Season	Winner	Runner Up	Result	Ref
2002–03				
2003–04	Clyde	Aberdeen	4–0	
2004–05	Forfar Farmington	Inverness Caledonian Thistle	2–1 a.e.t.	
2005–06	Lochee United	Arthurlie	4–2	
2006–07	Inverness	Vale of Clyde	3–0	
2007–08	Dundee United	Dalkeith	6–0	
2008–09	Glasgow City Reserves	Celtic Reserves	3–0	
2009	Celtic Reserves	Spartans Reserves	4–0	
2010	Celtic Reserves	Hibernian 2000	2–0	
2011	Aberdeen	Toryglen	2–1	

=== 2012 to 2019 ===
Scottish Women's Football League First Division Cup:

Season	Winner	Runner Up	Result	Ref
2012	Queen's Park	Paisley Saints	0–0 (3–2 pen)	
2013	Inverness City	Dunfermilne Athletic	6–0	
2014	Hearts	Dunfermline Athletic	3–1	
2015	Jeanfield Swifts	Hibernian Development	3–0	
2016	Hibernian Development	East Fife	2–1	
2017	Cumbernauld Colts	Celtic Academy	1–0	
2018	Celtic Academy	Hibernian Under 23's	1–0	
2019	Celtic Academy	Renfrew	6–0	

Scottish Women's Football League Second Division Cup:

Season	Winner	Runner Up	Result	Venue	Ref
1992–93	Stewarton Thistle	Meadow Athletic	4–2		
2012	Hearts	Aberdeen Reserves	6–1	Recreation Park, Alloa	
2013	Hibernian Development	Viewfield Rovers	5–0		
2014	Renfrew	Hamilton Caledonian	9–3	Ainslie Park, Edinburgh	
2015	Motherwell	Rangers Reserves	6–2	Ainslie Park, Edinburgh	
2016	Dundee United	Dunfermline Development	9–0	Ainslie Park, Edinburgh	
2017	Blackburn United	Bayside	3–2 a.e.t. (Note: After extra time; 1–1 after 90 mins)	Ainslie Park, Edinburgh	
2018	Kelty Hearts	Spartans Development	2–0	Ainslie Park, Edinburgh	
2019	Morton Girls	Dryburgh Athletic	3–2 a.e.t.	Ainslie Park, Edinburgh	

=== 2020–present ===
Since 2020, the cup has been a competition for all SWFL clubs. The previous two tiers were merged into one (below the SWF Championship). The 2020 competition was not completed due to the COVID-19 pandemic. The SWFL Plate was introduced in 2021 for clubs knocked out in the SWFL Cup group phase.

Scottish Women's Football League Cup:

Season	Winner	Runner Up	Result	Ref
2021	Bishopton	Bayside	4–0	
2022	Harmony Row	Linlithgow Rose	3–2	
2023–24	Glenrothes Strollers	McDermid Ladies	2–1	
2024-25	Edinburgh University Thistle	Cumbernauld Colts	6-1	
2025-26	Bishopton	Huntly	10-1	

Scottish Women's Football League Plate:

Season	Winner	Runner Up	Result	Ref
2021	Murieston	Ayr United Development	1–0	
2022	Motherwell Development	East Fife Development	0–0 a.e.t. (3–1 pen)	
2023–24	Linlithgow Rose	Musselburgh Windsor	6–4	
2024-25	Cumbernauld United	Grampian Ladies	5-0	
2025-26	Alloa Athletic	Penicuik Athletic	4-0	}

== See also ==
- Scottish Women's Cup
- Scottish Women's Premier League Cup
- SWF Championship Cup
