= East Fife =

East Fife may refer to:

- The Eastern part of Fife, a council area in Scotland
- East Fife F.C., a men's association football team
- East Fife G.W.F.C., a women's association football team
- East Fife (UK Parliament constituency), 1885–1983
