= Montrose W.F.C. =

Montrose
- Full name: Montrose Women's Football Club
- Nickname: The Gable Endies
- Founded: 2016; 10 years ago
- Ground: Links Park, Montrose
- Capacity: 4,936
- Chairman: Barry O'Neil
- Manager: Craig Feroz
- League: SWPL 1
- 2025-26: SWPL 1, 8th of 12
- Website: https://montrosefc.co.uk/women
Home colours	Away colours

Montrose Women's Football Club are a Scottish women's football club based in the town of Montrose, Angus. They are Scottish Women's Football members and currently play in the Scottish Women's Premier League 1 in the top tier of football in Scotland.

== Club history ==
The club was established by the Montrose Community Trust, the charitable arm of Montrose FC, in 2016. The team is still a member of the Montrose Community Trust, along with Montrose Youth FC, Montrose Amateur FC, Montrose Walking FC. They began playing competitive football a year later and first played in the SWFL Second Division (East). They finished their debut season in seventh place.

Montrose then moved in the 2018 season to the Second Division (North). Montrose were crowned champions and promoted to First Division (North) on the final match day with a 1-2 away to runners-up Stonehaven.

In the 2019 season, their first season in the Scottish third tier, Montrose placed seventh. The following two seasons (2020 and 2020–21) were both abandoned due to the coronavirus pandemic. After the withdrawal of Forfar Farmington from the SWPL at the end of the 2020–21 season, Montrose became the highest-ranked Angus team in the Scottish national leagues.

Montrose won the 2021–22 Scottish Women's Football Championship North with an incredible unbeaten season, securing promotion to SWPL 2 with a 4-1 victory over promotion rivals East Fife. The club also reached the inaugural SWF Championship Cup final that season, losing 1-0 to league rivals Dryburgh Athletic at Falkirk Stadium.

In the 2022-23 SWPL 2, Montrose had a very strong debut season in Scotland's second tier, losing only three times. The club were finally crowned league champions after a 6-1 win over East Fife on 30 April 2023. As champions, Montrose also sealed back-to-back promotion to the Scottish Women's Premier League, the top tier of women's football in Scotland, for the first time in the club's history.

== Current squad ==
As of 9 May 2026.

Note: Flags indicate national team as defined under FIFA eligibility rules; some limited exceptions apply. Players may hold more than one non-FIFA nationality.

No.	Pos.	Nation	Player
1	GK	NIR	Lauren Perry
3	DF	SCO	Charlie Elliott
5	DF	SCO	Georgia Carter
6	MF	SCO	Jade McLaren
7	DF	SCO	Chloe Gover
8	MF	SCO	Erin Ross
9	MF	SCO	Neve Guthrie
11	FW	SCO	Kaela McDonald-NGuah

No.	Pos.	Nation	Player
14	MF	SCO	Demi Taylor
15	FW	SCO	Louise Brown
16	FW	SCO	Hannah Innes
17	DF	SCO	Cassie Cowper
19	MF	SCO	Ashley Robertson
21	MF	SCO	Tally Robb
22	MF	SCO	Erin Henderson
26	GK	SCO	Ashley Milne

== Honours ==
Scottish Women's Premier League 2 (second tier):

- Winners: 2022–23

Scottish Women's Football Championship North (third tier):

- Winners: 2021–22

Scottish Women's Football League Second Division North (fourth tier):

- Winners: 2017

SWF Championship Cup:

- Runners up: 2021-22

== Club records ==
Biggest win:

- 0-19 v Caithness, 18 Feb 2018, Second Division (North)
- 0-19 v Gleniffer Thistle, 29 Aug 2021, SWF Championship Cup
- 19-0 v Dundee City West, 27 Feb 2022, Championship North

Biggest loss: 0-12 v Rangers, 17 Sep 2023, Scottish Women's Premier League

Largest attendance: 459, v Celtic, 13 Aug 2023

== Notable players ==
Bold denotes player still actively playing with the club.

- (Northern Ireland) **Lauren Perry**
