= Lauren Perry =

Northern Irish footballer (born 2001)

Personal information
- Full name: Lauren Perry
- Date of birth: 5 April 2001 (age 25)
- Place of birth: Northern Ireland
- Position: Goalkeeper

Team information
- Current team: Montrose
- Number: 1

Youth career
- Ballynahinch

Senior career*
Years	Team	Apps	(Gls)
2017–2019	Linfield		
2019–2020	Blackburn Rovers	0	(0)
2020–2021	Forfar Farmington		
2021–2023	Dundee United		
2023–	Montrose	20	(0)

International career^{‡}
2018	Northern Ireland U17	3	(0)
2017–	Northern Ireland U19	9	(0)
2018–	Northern Ireland	6	(0)
- * Club domestic league appearances and goals as of 13:57, 12 February 2024 (UTC) ‡ National team caps and goals as of 20 October 2019

Lauren Perry (born 5 April 2001) is a Northern Irish footballer who plays as a goalkeeper for Montrose in the Scottish Women's Premier League and for the Northern Ireland national team. She previously played for Linfield in Northern Ireland, Blackburn Rovers in England and Forfar Farmington and Dundee United in Scotland. She made her international debut for Northern Ireland in 2018.

== Club career ==
In March 2017, Perry signed for Linfield, the club where her father, Alan Perry, was assistant first team coach. She made her Linfield debut in a 5–2 win against Sion Swifts on 22 March 2017. On 22 August 2017, Perry made her Champions League debut in a 2017–18 qualifying round match against PK-35 Vantaa. In her first season with the club she was named Women's Premiership player of the year and NIFWA Women’s Personality of the Year.

On 2 October 2019, Perry signed with Blackburn Rovers in the English FA Women's Championship, shortly after former Linfield teammate Louise McDaniel made the same move. In August 2020 she moved to Scotland, joining SWPL 1 team Forfar Farmington. On 18 April 2021, she scored with a free kick from 25 yards to earn Forfar a 1–1 draw against Heart of Midlothian and was subsequently nominated for the league's Player of the Month award.

In July 2021, Perry was one of a number of players to leave Forfar for lower division teams shortly before they were forced to pull out of senior football. She joined Dundee United in the second tier of the SWPL, and was part of their squad that won the SWPL2 title in the 2021-22 season. Perry then joined another SWPL club, Montrose, in 2023.

== International ==
On 15 September 2018, Perry made her senior international debut for Northern Ireland in a 2019 FIFA Women's World Cup qualifying defeat to Norway. She made nine saves and was voted player of the match.

== Personal life ==
Perry comes from Ballynahinch, County Down. While playing for Blackburn, she studied for a degree in Sport and PE at the University of Central Lancashire.

== Honours ==
=== Club ===
Linfield

- NIFL Women's Premiership: 2017, 2018, 2019
- NIFL Women's Premiership League Cup: 2018

Dundee United

- Scottish Women's Premier League 2: 2021-22
