= Ayr United Football Academy =

Coordinates: 55°28′11″N 4°37′12″W

- Full name: Ayr United Football Academy
- Nickname(s): The Honest Men
- Founded: 2 December 2005; 19 years ago
- Ground: Somerset Park
- Chairman: Allan Gunning
- Head of Academy: David White
- League: SPFL Reserve League 2, Club Academy Scotland, Scottish Women's Football
- Website: http://www.aufa.org.uk/
| Home colours | Away colours |

Ayr United Football Academy is incorporated as a not for profit Company Limited by guarantee. Its members are Ayr United Football Club, The Ayr United Community Initiative (The Honest Men Trust), NHS Ayrshire and Arran (Community Health Partnership), Ayrshire College and South Ayrshire Council, each of which is represented by a board director. In addition there are three independent directors and an independent chairperson.

== Directors ==
| Name | Role |
|---|---|
| Allan Gunning | Chairman |
| Brian Connolly | Director |
| John Crawford | Director |
| Stuart Millar | Director |
| Elizabeth Moore | Director |
| Alan Murray | Director |
| Graham Peterkin | Director |
| Lorraine Stobie | Director |
| Phil White | Director |

== Players ==
=== Under 18's squad ===
Note: Flags indicate national team as defined under FIFA eligibility rules; some limited exceptions apply. Players may hold more than one non-FIFA nationality.

| No. | Pos. | Nation | Player |
|---|---|---|---|
| — | GK | (Scotland) SCO | Liam Breuls |
| — | DF | (Scotland) SCO | Jude McClymont |
| — | DF | (Scotland) SCO | Jack Pryce |
| — | DF | (Scotland) SCO | Lewis Allan |
| — | DF | (Scotland) SCO | Jack McEwan |
| — | DF | (Scotland) SCO | Kyle Fraser |
| — | DF | (Scotland) SCO | Adam McNally |
| — | MF | (Scotland) SCO | Joe Cassidy |
| — | MF | (Scotland) SCO | Shaun Donnelly |

| No. | Pos. | Nation | Player |
|---|---|---|---|
| — | MF | (Scotland) SCO | Bruce Strachan |
| — | MF | (Scotland) SCO | Blaike Hay |
| — | MF | (Scotland) SCO | David Craig |
| — | MF | (Scotland) SCO | Evan Ferguson |
| — | FW | (Scotland) SCO | Lucas McRoberts |
| — | FW | (Scotland) SCO | Jack Allan |
| — | FW | (Scotland) SCO | Brandon Cullen |
| — | FW | (Scotland) SCO | Jamie Hislop |

== Staff ==
| Position | Name |
|---|---|
| Head of Academy | David White |

== List of academy graduates ==
Below is a list of players that have come through the club's academy set-up who made a competitive first-team appearance for Ayr United F.C. since 2006 to the present day.

Players in bold are currently at the club or out on loan.

First-team graduates
| # | Name and nationality | Date of debut | Opposition | Home or Away | Apps | Goals |
|---|---|---|---|---|---|---|
| 1 | (Scotland) Alastair Woodburn | 8 December 2007 | Peterhead | Away | 35 | 0 |
| 2 | (Scotland) Lloyd Kinnaird | 19 April 2008 | Queen's Park | Away | 1 | 0 |
| 3 | (Scotland) Iain Fisher | 9 May 2009 | Peterhead | Away | 1 | 0 |
| 4 | (Scotland) Aaron Connolly | 18 January 2010 | Brechin City | Home | 8 | 1 |
| 5 | (Scotland) Roddy Paterson | 24 July 2010 | Airdrieonians | Away | 9 | 1 |
| 6 | (Scotland) Ross Robertson | 24 July 2010 | Airdrieonians | Away | 76 | 5 |
| 7 | (Scotland) Jonathan Tiffoney | 24 July 2010 | Airdrieonians | Away | 87 | 2 |
| 8 | (Scotland) Shaun Kelly | 20 November 2010 | Sunnybank | Home | 1 | 0 |
| 9 | (Scotland) Mark Shankland | 7 May 2011 | Brechin City | Away | 34 | 2 |
| 10 | (Scotland) Gareth Armstrong | 7 May 2011 | Brechin City | Away | 8 | 0 |
| 11 | (Scotland) Steven Hutchinson | 28 April 2012 | Dundee | Home | 2 | 0 |
| 12 | (Scotland) Jackson Longridge | 28 April 2012 | Dundee | Home | 11 | 0 |
| 13 | (Scotland) Aaron Wyllie | 5 May 2012 | Falkirk | Away | 12 | 0 |
| 14 | (Scotland) Darren McGill | 5 May 2012 | Falkirk | Away | 4 | 0 |
| 15 | (Scotland) Robbie Crawford | 5 May 2012 | Falkirk | Away | 225 | 12 |
| 16 | (Scotland) Ryan Nisbet | 27 April 2013 | Arbroath | Home | 15 | 0 |
| 17 | (Scotland) Michael Wardrope | 27 April 2013 | Arbroath | Home | 24 | 2 |
| 18 | (Scotland) Alan Forrest | 27 July 2013 | Queen's Park | Away | 245 | 55 |
| 19 | (Scotland) Peter McGill | 26 July 2014 | Clyde | Away | 10 | 0 |
| 20 | (Scotland) Andrew Muir | 2 August 2014 | East Stirling | Away | 12 | 0 |
| 21 | (Scotland) Sean McKenzie | 9 August 2014 | Greenock Morton | Home | 11 | 0 |
| 22 | (Scotland) Craig McCracken | 11 November 2014 | Alloa Athletic | Away | 7 | 0 |
| 23 | (Scotland) Craig McGuffie | 9 April 2016 | Albion Rovers | Home | 110 | 10 |
| 24 | (Scotland) Andy Johnstone | 16 July 2016 | Hamilton Accies | Home | 2 | 0 |
| 25 | (Scotland) Luke McCowan | 18 July 2017 | Dumbarton | Away | 77 | 19 |
| 26 | (Scotland) Leon Murphy | 25 July 2017 | Clyde | Home | 10 | 1 |
| 27 | (Scotland) David Waite | 16 August 2017 | East Stirling | Away | 1 | 0 |
| 28 | (Scotland) Stuart Faulds | 16 August 2017 | East Stirling | Away | 4 | 0 |
| 29 | (Scotland) James Hilton | 16 August 2017 | East Stirling | Away | 2 | 0 |
| 30 | (Scotland) Finn Ecrepont | 30 November 2018 | Dundee United | Away | 20 | 0 |
| 31 | (New Zealand) Ellis Hare-Reid | 7 September 2019 | Wrexham | Away | 1 | 0 |
| 32 | (Scotland) **Mark McKenzie** | 7 September 2019 | Wrexham | Away | 175 | 15 |
| 33 | (Scotland) Michael Hewitt | 6 October 2020 | Albion Rovers | Away | 32 | 0 |
| 34 | (Scotland) Paul Smith | 6 October 2020 | Albion Rovers | Away | 54 | 0 |
| 35 | (Scotland) Kinlay Bilham | 14 September 2021 | Rangers B | Away | 3 | 0 |
| 36 | (Scotland) Alex Jeanes | 14 September 2021 | Rangers B | Away | 1 | 0 |
| 37 | (Scotland) **Fraser Bryden** | 8 January 2022 | Arbroath | Away | 72 | 9 |
| 38 | (Scotland) **Dylan Watret** | 3 December 2022 | Raith Rovers | Away | 21 | 2 |
| 39 | (Scotland) **Scott Tomlinson** | 11 February 2023 | Elgin City | Away | 23 | 0 |
| 40 | (Scotland) **Oliver Ecrepont** | 29 July 2023 | Alloa Athletic | Away | 1 | 0 |
| 41 | (Scotland) **Max Guthrie** | 10 February 2024 | Rangers | Away | 1 | 0 |
| 42 | (Scotland) **Lucas McRoberts** | 29 March 2024 | Airdrieonians | Away | 5 | 1 |
| 43 | (Scotland) **Jamie Hislop** | 21 September 2024 | Queen's Park | Away | 3 | 0 |
| 44 | (Scotland) **David Craig** | 14 December 2024 | Falkirk | Away | 1 | 0 |

=== Notable former players ===
Below are the notable former players who have played for the academy but left before making a first team appearance.

- (Scotland) Aaron Muirhead
- (Scotland) Kyle McAusland
- (Scotland) James Maxwell
- (Scotland) Siriki Dembele
- (Scotland) Ben Doak

== Notes ==
1. Returned to the club in 2019 and made his debut at the age of 28 having left in 2008 without making an appearance.
2. Had two loan spells at the club during the 2012-13 and 2013-14 seasons
3. Played for the club on loan during the 2021-22 season
