= Hugh McLaughlin (footballer, born 1945) =

Scottish footballer (1945–2020)

Personal information
- Date of birth: 1945
- Date of death: 21 July 2020 (aged 74–75)
- Positions: Wing half; inside forward

Youth career
- Denny B.C.

Senior career*
Years	Team	Apps	(Gls)
1962–1964	Stirling Albion	26	(0)
1964–1967	Third Lanark	68	(19)
1967–1972	St Mirren	121	(11)
1972–1973	Queen of the South	23	(1)
- Cambuslang Rangers
Total		238	(31)
- * Club domestic league appearances and goals

Hugh McLaughlin (1945 – 21 July 2020) was a Scottish professional footballer who played as a wing half and inside forward for Denny B.C., Stirling Albion, Third Lanark, St Mirren, Queen of the South and Cambuslang Rangers.

He died on 21 July 2020 following a long illness.
