= Scottish Women's Football League Second Division =

- Divisions: 1 (1999–2008); 4 (2012–2019)
- Number of clubs: 10–40
- Level on pyramid: 3 (1999–2015); 4 (2016–2019)
- Promotion to: Scottish Women's Football League First Division
- Domestic cup: Scottish Women's Cup
- League cup: SWFL Second Division Cup
- Website: Scottish Women's Football

The Scottish Women's Football League Second Division (SWFL 2) was a division in the Scottish women's football pyramid between 1999 and 2019. The third league tier from 1999 to 2015, it later became the fourth tier. Its top teams won promotion to the SWFL First Division.

The Second Division began as a single national division, but became three regional divisions in 2008–09, the North, East and West. It was further enlarged in 2012 to four divisions. From 2016 to 2019, SWFL 2 had forty clubs in four regional divisions. The champions of each division were eligible to enter play-offs for promotion to the First Division.

In 2020, Scottish Women's Football replaced the First Division with the SWF Championship, and the Second Division took the existing name of the Scottish Women's Football League. The SWFL is now a standalone 'Recreational' league with multiple regional divisions, resembling the former Second Division, but now with no regular promotion or relegation.

== History ==
The Second Division was initially a single national competition, played as a double round-robin.

=== Champions ===
National division champions – league level 3:

- 1999-00: Forfar Farmington
- 2000–01: Hamilton Athletic
- 2001–02: Hawkcraig United
- 2002–03: Falkirk L.F.C.
- 2003–04: Arsenal North
- 2004–05: Inverness City
- 2005–06: Buchan
- 2006–07: Cowdenbeath
- 2007–08: Celtic Reserves

Regional division champions – league level 3:

- 2008–09: South-West / West: Glasgow City Reserves
- 2008–09: South-East / Central Musselburgh Windsor
- 2009: South-West / West Troon
- 2009: South-East / East / Central Airdrie United

Season	North group	West group	East group	South East group	Ref
2010	Aberdeen City	Paisley Saints Ladies	Hibernian 2000	–	
2011	Buchan	Kilwinning Sports Club	Forfar Farmington	–	
2012	Stonehaven	Murieston United	Dunfermline Athletic	Heart of Midlothian	

Season	North	West/South West	East/Central	South East	Ref
2013	Aberdeen Reserves	Claremont	Jeanfield Swifts	Hibernian Development	
2014	Dee Vale	Mill United	East Fife	Boroughmuir Thistle	
2015	Dee Vale	Glasgow City Development	Central Girls Academy	Motherwell	

Regional division champions – league level 4:

Season	North/East	West/South West	West/Central	South East/Central	Ref
2016	Granite City	Renfrew	Partick Thistle	Dundee United	
2017	Deveronvale	Morton	Blackburn United	Bayside	
2018	Montrose	Ayr United	Glasgow City B	Kelty Hearts	
2019	Dundee West	Morton	Bishopton	Edinburgh Caledonia	

== Seasons ==
=== 1999–2008 ===
In the season 2000–01, Hamilton Athletic finished top of the 10-team national Second Division.

- Arthurlie
- Falkirk
- GC Wellpark
- Hamilton Athletic
- Inverness Caledonian Thistle
- Inverurie Utd
- Livingston
- Middlefield WSC
- Preston
- Whitehill Welfare

Falkirk Ladies had won promotion from the SWFL Third Division in 1999–2000, and they became the Second Division champions in 2002–03, ahead of Dundee City and Civil Service Strollers. Falkirk sealed the title with late-season wins over St. Johnstone away and Dundee City at Brockville.

In 2005–06, the top teams in the division were champions Buchan Girls, Crichton, Cowdenbeath, Arsenal North 2nd LFC and Thistle LFC. Cowdenbeath won the 2006–07 championship.

2007–08 was the last season of the national SWFL Second Division. The member clubs were:

- Celtic 'B'
- Dundee City
- Dunfermline Athletic
- East Kilbride Thistle
- Hamilton Academical 'B'
- Kemnay
- F.C. Kilmarnock
- Paisley Saints
- Maryhill
- Tynecastle

=== 2008–2012 ===
After the switch to the three regional divisions (North, East and West) in 2008–09, the Second Division's member clubs were:

North:

- Aberdeen University
- Buchan
- Dee Vale
- Dons Ladies
- Dundee City
- Dundee University
- Forfar Farmington Lassies
- Glendale Ladies
- Kemnay
- Monifieth
- SLB Harriers
- Stonehaven Ladies

West:

- Airdrie United (replaced Clyde LFC after two matches)
- Glasgow City Reserves
- Glasgow Ladies B
- Glasgow University
- Hamilton Accies 'B'
- Linwood Rangers
- Loudon
- Maryhill
- Paisley Saints
- Team Strathclyde
- Troon
- F.C. Kilmarnock withdrew before the season started

East:

- Boroughmuir
- Dunfermline Athletic
- East Fife
- Hibernian B
- Motherwell
- Murieston United
- Musselburgh Windsor
- Spartans B
- Stenhousemuir Ladies
- St. Johnstone

The Scottish women's football divisions used the autumn–spring season calendar until 2008–09. From the season 2009, they switched to a summer schedule (March–November).

The three-division system continued with the new schedule, in the 2010 and 2011 seasons.

Owing to an influx of new clubs, for the 2012 season the Second Division East was split into two separate East and South-East divisions. The East division was now based around Fife and Tayside while the South-East division was centred on Edinburgh and the Lothians.

Hearts, Hibernian 1875, Falkirk FC and a Spartans Reserve team moved from the East division to the South East in 2012. Boroughmuir Thistle, Football Club of Edinburgh, Leith Athletic, Musselburgh Windsor and Seton Ladies were new clubs.

2011 North champions Buchan Ladies were promoted to the First Division while Dundee City and Forfar Farmington Blues transferred to the East. New clubs were a Buchan Ladies Youth side, Turriff United and Dee Ladies, part of the Dee Boys Club set-up.

=== 2013 ===
Member clubs in the 2013 season:

==== North Division ====
No clubs accepted promotion from the 2012 North competition, with champions Stonehaven and runners-up Dee Vale competing again in 2013.

Luthermuir were transferred from the Second Division East where they played in 2012. Elgin City were formerly known as Moray Ladies.

- Aberdeen LFC Development, Aberdeen
- Aberdeen LFC Reserves
- Buchan Ladies Youth, Cruden Bay
- Dee Ladies, Aberdeen
- Dee Vale, Maryculter
- Elgin City, Elgin
- Kemnay, Kemnay
- Luthermuir
- Stonehaven, Stonehaven
- Turriff United, Turriff

==== East/Central Division ====
2012 champions Dunfermline Athletic and runners-up East Fife Ladies were promoted to the SWFL First Division, however both clubs entered reserve sides in the Second Division in 2013. East Fife added the suffix Violet after linking up with Cupar Violet GFC.

Raith Rovers were relegated from the 2012 First Division. Falkirk FC were transferred from the South East Division while Stenhousemuir arrived from the West Division. Tayside Ladies, a senior section of Celtic Girls (Tayside), entered for the first time. Arbroath CSC and Monifieth who resigned during the 2012 season did not return.

- Dundee City, Dundee
- Dunfermline 2013, Dunfermline
- East Fife Violet, Levenmouth
- Falkirk FC, Falkirk
- Falkirk LFC Reserves
- Forfar Farmington Ladies
- Jeanfield Swifts, Perth
- Raith Rovers, Kirkcaldy
- Stenhousemuir, Stenhousemuir
- Tayside Ladies, Lochee

==== South East Division ====
2012 champions Hearts were promoted to the SWFL First Division but entered a development side in the Second Division in 2013. Edinburgh Caledonia, Hutchison Vale Reserves and Murieston United Reds were new clubs.

- Boroughmuir Thistle
- Edinburgh Caledonia, Edinburgh
- FC Edinburgh Ladies, Edinburgh
- Hearts Development
- Hibernian Development
- Hutchison Vale Reserves
- Leith Athletic, Edinburgh
- Murieston United Reds, Livingston
- Musselburgh Windsor, Musselburgh
- Seton Ladies, Port Seton
- Spartans Reserves

==== West/South West Division ====
2012 champions Murieston United were promoted to the SWFL First Division. Hamilton Caledonian, Irvine Thistle, Kilwinning Development, Mill United and Whitburn joined the league in 2013; EK Galaxy dropped out, while Hamilton Academical Reserves withdrew to play in a new development league.

- Claremont, East Kilbride
- Dumfries, Dumfries
- Glasgow Girls, Glasgow
- Hamilton Caledonian, Hamilton
- Irvine Thistle, Irvine
- Kilwinning Development
- Mill United, Hamilton
- Stranraer, Stranraer
- Viewfield Rovers, Lochwinnoch
- Whitburn, Whitburn

=== 2017 ===
The following teams played in the SWFL Second Division during the 2017 season. As well as first teams, the SWFL structures also incorporated a number of development or youth teams of other SWPL and SWFL clubs.

North:

- Buchan Youth
- Buckie Ladies
- Deveronvale
- Moray Ladies
- Ross County
- Stonehaven
- Turriff United

West:

- Ayr United
- Bishopton
- Dumbarton United
- F.C. Kilmarnock 23s
- Kilwinning
- Morton
- Pollok United
- Queen of the South
- Rutherglen
- St Roch's (Note: Withdrew during the season, results removed)
- Stranraer
- United Glasgow
- Westerlands B

Central:

- Airdrie
- Blackburn United
- Broxburn Athletic Colts
- Cumbernauld Colts Development
- East Kilbride Girls
- Glasgow Girls Development
- Hamilton Academical Development
- Hawick United
- Linlithgow Rose
- Motherwell Development
- Murieston United
- Stenhousemuir

East:

- Bayside
- Dundee City
- East Fife Violet
- Edinburgh Caledonia
- Edinburgh South
- Forfar Farmington Ladies
- Hutchison Vale Development
- Letham
- Montrose
- Raith Rovers
- Seton Ladies
- Spartans Development

=== 2019 ===
Member clubs in the 2019 season:

North/East:

- Buchan Youth
- Dryburgh Athletic
- Dundee City
- Dunfermline Athletic U21s
- East Fife Development
- Forfar Farmington Women
- Granite City Ladies
- Jeanfield Swifts Women
- Moray
- Westdyke Thistle Ladies

Details:

South East/Central:

- Airdrie Ladies
- Blackburn United Development
- Borders Ladies
- Edinburgh Caledonia FC
- Falkirk
- Lothian
- Murieston United
- Musselburgh Windsor
- Stenhousemuir
- Stirling University Development

Details:

West/Central:

- Bishopton
- BSC Glasgow
- Clyde FC
- Glasgow Girls U23s
- Motherwell Development
- Pollok United
- Renton Craigandro Ladies
- St Mirren WFC
- United Glasgow
- West Park United

Details:

West/South West:

- Annan Athletic Ladies FC
- Clark Drive Ladies
- East Kilbride Thistle Ladies
- Gleniffer Thistle
- Kilwinning
- Mid Annandale Ladies
- Morton Women
- Rutherglen
- Stewarton United Ladies
- Stranraer Ladies

Details:

== See also ==
- Scottish Women's Football League Second Division Cup
