= Gartcairn W.F.C. =

Scottish women's football team

Coordinates: 55.87163°N 3.967341°W

Gartcairn Women FC
- Full name: Gartcairn Women FC
- Nickname: The Cairn
- Founded: 2019
- Stadium: MTC Park, Airdrie
- Capacity: 300
- Owner: Robert McCallum
- Manager: Robert McCallum
- League: SWPL 2
- 2023–24: 6th
- Website: www.gartcairnwfc.com
Home colours	Away colours	Third colours

Gartcairn W.F.C. is a Scottish women's football team based in Airdrie, North Lanarkshire that play in the SWPL 2.

== History ==
The team was established in March 2019. They entered the 2020 Scottish Women's League Division 1 South, On 13 March 2020 the league was indefinitely suspended due to the 2019–20 coronavirus outbreak. The 2020–21 season was also abandoned. They won the 2021-22 League championship and were promoted to the Scottish Women's Premier League 2. In June 2022 the SWPL came under the auspices of the SPFL, which controls the men's senior game, and Gartcairn became one of the inaugural members of the new SWPL2 along with 7 other clubs. In season 2022-23 they finished 2nd in the division, participating in a playoff final against Hamilton Accies in a bid for back-to-back promotions. The match, played at Broadwood Stadium in Cumbernauld and shown live on BBC Alba, ended 2–1 in favour of Hamilton.In the 2023–24 season, Gartcairn finished 5th in SWPL 2. Graeme Hart took charge as head coach during the campaign, and in his first full season in 2024–25 the team improved to finish 4th. Following a restructuring of SWPL 2 to a ten-team division for 2025–26, Gartcairn finished the season in 6th place.

== Squad ==
As of 4 August 2026 Note: Flags indicate national team as defined under FIFA eligibility rules; some limited exceptions apply. Players may hold more than one non-FIFA nationality.

No.	Pos.	Nation	Player
1	GK	SCO	Lauren McIness
21	GK	SCO	Zara Carey
3	DF	SCO	Rebecca Brady
4	DF	SCO	Gracie Robertson
5	DF	SCO	Rebecca Simpson
6	DF	SCO	Nicole Carter
16	DF	SCO	Abby Macmillan
22	DF	SCO	Summer Laird
28	DF	SCO	Rebecca Gallagher
31	DF	SCO	Taylor Hogg

No.	Pos.	Nation	Player
7	MF	SCO	Jemma McQuillan
8	MF	SCO	Alba Stewart
10	MF	SCO	Jessica Linden
14	MF	SCO	Isla Gourley
17	MF	SCO	Sarah Jane Arr
20	MF	SCO	Kirsty Jackson

No.	Pos.	Nation	Player
9	FW	SCO	Clare Docherty
11	FW	SCO	Mya Bates
15	FW	SCO	Teoni Steele
18	FW	ENG	Tanaka Chitengu
19	FW	SCO	Maddie Maxwell
25	FW	SCO	Alana Meechan

== Honours ==
- SWF Championship: 2021–22 (South section - promoted)

== League history ==
Season	League	Position
2019–20	Scottish Women's Football League Division 1 South	Season suspended (COVID-19)
2020–21	Scottish Women's Football League Division 1 South	Season abandoned (COVID-19)
2021–22	Scottish Women's Football League Division 1 South	1st (champions, promoted)
2022–23	SWPL 2	2nd (lost promotion play-off)
2023–24	SWPL 2	5th
2024–25	SWPL 2	4th
2025–26	SWPL 2	6th of 10

== Backroom staff ==
Backroom Staff
Name	Designation	Duration
Grame Hart	Manager	2024–present
Robert McCallum	Head Coach /Owner	2020–present
Billy McCall	Coach / Owner	2020–present
Jamie Donald	Coach	2026-present
Tony Morris	Goalkeeper Coach	2022–present
Scott Hunter	First Aider	2020–present
Kenny Gillespie	Media Manager / Owner	2020–present
Eve Begg	Sports Therapist	2023–present
Shannon Laverty	Physiotherapist	2023–present
Alastair Stewart	Physiotherapist	2025–present

== See also ==
- Gartcairn F. A. Juniors
