= Scottish Women's Football Championship =

SWF Championship SWF League One
- Founded: 2020 (Championship); 2022 (League One)
- Country: Scotland
- Number of clubs: 12 (Championship); 12 (League One)
- Level on pyramid: 3 (Championship); 4 (League One)
- Promotion to: SWPL 2 (Championship); SWF Championship (League One)
- Relegation to: SWF League One (Championship); SWFL (League One)
- Domestic cup: Scottish Cup
- League cup: SWF Championship Cup
- Website: scotwomensfootball.com
- Current: 2024–25 SWF Championship

The Barclays Scottish Women's Football Championship is the third league tier of women's football in Scotland. Founded in 2020, the Championship replaced the SWFL First Division (SWFL 1). The Championship was played in North and South divisions for three seasons until 2022, when it became a single national division with eight clubs. Scottish Women's Football League One was formed in 2022 as Scotland's fourth tier of women's football, with 12 clubs (coming from the Championship).

Barclays Scottish Women's League One is the fourth tier of the women's football pyramid and is a single national division. Earlier, the level 4 tier was the SWFL Third Division (1999–2008), SWFL Second Division (2016–2019), and the SWFL (2020–2025), which is now level 5.

The Championship's first winners were Montrose (North) and Gartcairn (South). Teams can win promotion from the Championship to SWPL 2, and from League One to the Championship. Relegation from League One to the SWFL was introduced for the 2024/25 season, but some clubs had previously moved between these levels.

== History ==
Like the SWFL First Division from 2016 to 2019, the Championship was played in North and South divisions for three seasons from 2020 to 2022. Championship North and Championship South had a total of 26 clubs. The Championship was expected to continue with Scottish Women's Football's summer calendar for its seasons (playing March–November), but that system was abandoned by the Championship and SWPL during 2020. Due to the coronavirus pandemic, the leagues switched back to winter seasons in 2020–21.

The Championship's inaugural 2020 season and 2020–21 season were both abandoned, due to the pandemic, and were declared null and void by SWF. The 2020–21 abandonment was made to allow SWF to focus on preparations for the 2021–22 season, which was completed. The divisional champions were Montrose (North) and Gartcairn (South).

A national SWF Championship division came into effect in the 2022–23 season, as did the SWF League One as the fourth tier. The Championship North and South divisions were discontinued and their clubs mainly moved into the new divisions. The Championship and League One became title sponsored by Barclays for the 2024/25 season and renamed the Barclays Scottish Women's Championship and League One.

== Member clubs for the 2026–27 season ==
=== Barclays Scottish Women's Championship ===
- Ayr United
- Bonnyrigg Rose
- Dryburgh Athletic
- Dunipace
- East Fife
- Elgin City
- Forfar Farmington
- Inverness Caledonian Thistle
- Morton
- Rossvale
- Stenhousemuir
- Stirling University

=== Barclays Scottish Women's League One ===
- Airdrie CC
- Armadale Thistle
- Bishopton
- Cambusdoon
- Dunfermline Athletic
- Edinburgh South
- Giffnock Soccer Centre
- Huntly FC
- Inverurie Locomotive Works
- Queen of the South
- St Mirren
- Westdyke

== Play-offs ==
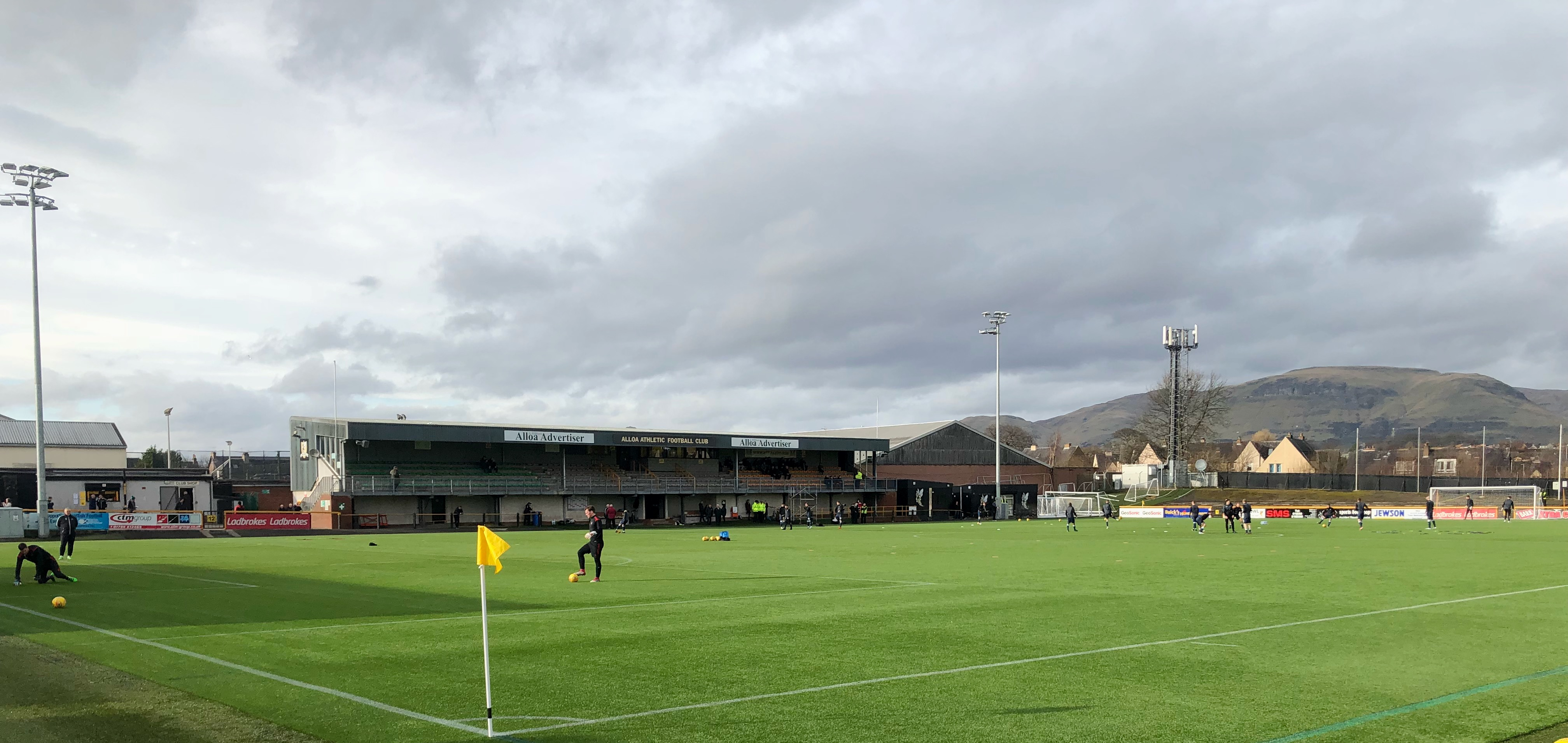
Recreation Park, Alloa hosted the promotion play-off in 2022

The runners-up in Championship North and Championship South were intended to play-off against each other at the end of each season for a place in the promotion/relegation play-off final against the team that finished eighth in SWPL 2. Due to the uncompleted seasons in 2020 and 2020–21, the North–South play-off occurred only once, in 2021–22, but no SWPL clubs were relegated, because of the SWPL's expansion to 20 clubs. The North's East Fife beat the South division runners-up, Rossvale, 3–1 in the single-match promotion play-off in Alloa in May 2022.

Since becoming national leagues, the Championship runner-up has entered a play-off with the second bottom of SWPL2 for promotion, with Ayr United beating Rossvale in extra time to win this for the first time at the end of the 2023/24 season.

Similarly, the League One runners-up enters a play-off with the second bottom of the Championship, with Armadale Thistle winning promotion in this way for 2025/26 then losing out to Dunipace 12 months later to return to Barclays League One.

== Seasons ==
The SWF Championship kicked off in 2020, but its first two seasons were not completed.

The following clubs have been the champions of the respective divisions:

Season	Championship North	Championship South	Ref
2020	Null and void due to COVID-19 pandemic		
2020–21	Null and void due to COVID-19 pandemic		
2021–22 (Note: Both winners promoted along with East Fife (North runners-up) who defeated Rossvale (South runners-up) in a playoff.)	Montrose	Gartcairn	

Season	Championship	League One	Ref
2022–23	Livingston (Note: Only Livingston were promoted; runners-up Rossvale were defeated by SWPL2 Stirling University in a playoff.)	FC Edinburgh	
2023–24	Rossvale (Note: Runners-up Ayr United also promoted after beating SWPL2 Glasgow Women in a playoff.)	Stenhousemuir	
2024–25	East Fife	Bonnyrigg Rose	
2025–26	Renfrew Ladies	Elgin City	
