= United Glasgow F.C. =

Football club in Glasgow, Scotland

United Glasgow Football Club is a football club based in Glasgow, Scotland.

== History ==
United Glasgow was founded in 2011.
