= Scottish Women's Football League =

- Organising body: Scottish Women's Football
- Founded: 1972 (SWFA League); 1999 (SWFL)
- First season: 1999–2000 (SWFL)
- Country: Scotland
- Confederation: UEFA
- Divisions: 4
- Number of clubs: 40
- Promotion to: SWF Championship
- Domestic cup: Scottish Women's Cup
- League cup: Scottish Women's Football League Cup

The Scottish Women's Football League (SWFL) is a group of women's football divisions in Scotland. The league is owned and managed by Scottish Women's Football (SWF), an affiliated body of the Scottish Football Association (SFA).

Following on from the national league of the Scottish Women's Football Association founded in 1972, the SWFL was formed by clubs and the SWFA in 1999 as the country's top four women's league tiers.

From 1999 until 2015, the SWFL First Division (SWFL 1) was the second tier of Scottish women's football; its Premier Division broke off to create the Scottish Women's Premier League (SWPL) in 2002. The subsequent additions of SWPL 2 (2016), the SWF Championship (2021) and SWF League One (2023) means that The SWFL now comprises the fifth tier of the Scottish league system, and currently has 40 clubs in four regional divisions.

== History ==
The modern Scottish women's leagues began in 1972–73, when Westthorn United won the national title. League systems in the 1990s included a tiered divisional system, or feeder leagues in the North, East and West of Scotland, as well as an Inter-Region Cup. The top division was known from 1997 to 1999 as the Sports Connection Premier for sponsorship reasons, in the Sports Connection Women's Scottish League.

The Scottish Women's Football League was formed on 6 November 1999, with the top four national divisions: the Premier Division, First, Second and Third Division. The League had 46 clubs in 2000.

The SWFL Premier Division constituted the top division in Scottish women's football from 1999–2000 until 2001–02. Three clubs became national champions in those seasons: Cumbernauld, Ayr United, and F.C. Kilmarnock. The women's Ayrshire derby, Ayr–Kilmarnock, was a key match in the national title race in each season in the early 2000s.

Ayr United were Scotland's first representative in the UEFA Women's Cup in 2001–02, as a group host at Somerset Park. Kilmarnock played in the 2002–03 tournament in Austria.

Below the Premier division, the First Division (SWFL 1) and Second Division (SWFL 2) existed from 1999 until 2019.

The Third Division was the national fourth-tier league founded by the SWFL in 1999. The most prominent member of the Third Division in 1999–2000 was Third Lanark, a women's team formed 22 years after the disbandment of the Third Lanark A.C. men's team and playing its games at Cathkin Park. Falkirk Ladies won promotion from the Third Division in 1999–2000; later seasons' champions were Baillieston (2000–01), and F.C. Kilmarnock Girls (2002–03). The division was separated into two groups, the West and East, each with eight clubs in 2004–05, and seven and eight respectively in 2006–07. They became the Third Division North and South, each with nine clubs, in 2007–08. This league tier was disbanded by 2010.

In 2002, the SWFL's twelve-team top division broke away to form the SWPL, leaving the remaining thirty clubs in the SWFL. In 2016, the SWPL expanded to two divisions, meaning the SWFL was now at the third and fourth tiers of the league structure.

In the reorganisation in 2016, the national SWFL First Division (SWFL 1) split into two regionalised leagues (North and South), above the Second Division (SWFL 2) with four regionalised leagues. The SWF Championship was created in 2020 as the new third tier of the 'Performance' category of the Scottish game. The Championship retained the existing North–South divisions but replaced the SWFL First Division, which was officially discontinued, as was the Second Division. The new fourth tier, named the SWFL, operated regional divisions in a separate 'Recreational' category, with no automatic promotion or relegation for its clubs.

These divisions were reorganised in 2023 and a short season began from January to May 2023 before a winter season from August 2023. The leagues are also integrated into the "pyramid" and promotion and relegation with League 1 introduced.

== Cup competitions ==
The League Cup, originating from the 1970s, was latterly known as the Scottish Women's Football League First Division Cup from 2012 when an additional Second Division Cup was introduced. Following the 2019 reorganisation, this reverted to a single SWFL League Cup competition, with a 'Plate' for clubs eliminated in the opening round.

SWFL teams also compete in the primary national cup competition, the Scottish Women's Cup.

== 2023–24 clubs ==
The following teams are playing in the SWFL in the 2023–24 season. As well as first teams, the SWFL divisions also incorporate a number of development or youth teams of other Scottish League clubs.

=== North ===
- Arbroath
- Buchan Ladies United
- Dryburgh Athletic
- Dyce
- Elgin City
- Grampian Ladies
- Huntly
- Inverurie Loco Works
- Stonehaven Ladies
- Westdyke

=== East ===
- Armadale Thistle
- Central Girls
- Dunfermline Athletic
- East Fife Development
- Edinburgh South
- Edinburgh University Thistle
- Glenrothes Stollers
- Linlithgow Rose
- McDermid Ladies
- Murieston United
- Musselburgh Windsor

=== South ===
- Annan Athletic
- Ardrossan Winton Rovers
- Ayr United Development
- Bishopton
- Cumnock Juniors
- Dalbeattie Star
- Harmony Row
- Kilwinning
- Nithsdale Wanderers
- Stewarton United

=== West ===
- Alloa Athletic
- Clydebank
- Cumbernauld Colts
- Drumchapel United
- Dumbarton United
- Dunipace
- Gleniffer Thistle
- Rossvale Development
- West Park United

== Seasons ==
Champions and runners-up of the SWFL Premier Division, 1999–2002:

Season	Champions	Runners-up	Ref
1999–2000	Stenhousemuir (Cumbernauld United were administered by SFC between Oct 1999 and Feb 2001)	Ayr United	
2000–01	Ayr United	Glasgow City	
2001–02	F.C. Kilmarnock	Glasgow City	

For seasons and champions in the other divisions from 1999 to 2019, see SWFL First Division (SWFL 1) and SWFL Second Division (SWFL 2).

The following clubs are the winners of the SWFL regional divisions since 2020:

Season	North/East	West/South West	Central/South East	Ref
2020	Season curtailed due to COVID-19 pandemic			
2021	Bayside	Bishopton Ladies	Motherwell Development	
2022	East Fife	Harmony Row	Livingston Development	

Season	North	East	South	West	Ref
2023	Forfar Farmington	Livingston Development	Queen of the South	Harmony Row	
2024	Inverurie Locos	Armadale Thistle	Ayr United Development	Dunipace	

== See also ==
- Highlands and Islands League
