= Cults Academy =

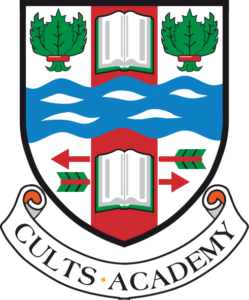
- Cults Academy Arms

Location
- Quarry Road; Aberdeen, AB15 9TP; Scotland; 57°07′06″N 2°11′20″W

Information
- Established: 1967
- Local authority: Aberdeen City Council
- Head Teacher: Ross Allan
- Staff: 100 (approx)
- Gender: Coeducational
- Age: 11 to 18
- Enrolment: 1,316 (2024)
- Houses: Cairn, Devenick, Friarsfield, Ronan, Murtle, Blairs, Hillview
- Colours: Red, Blue, Green, Orange, Yellow, Purple and Silver
- Website: Cults Academy

Cults Academy is an Aberdeen City Council secondary school in Cults, Aberdeen, Scotland. It was the recipient of The Sunday Times Scottish State Secondary School of the Year Award 2008 because of its outstanding exam results that year, having been rated 3rd in 2005. As of 2023, Cults Academy is the 6th best school in Scotland. Based on pupil numbers, Cults Academy is the largest state school in Aberdeen. It was founded in 1967.

The old 1960s school building was replaced with a new building on the former site of its playing fields in 2009.

== Pupils ==
Approximately 1300 attend the school each year (one of the largest school rolls in the Aberdeen area), between the ages of approximately 11 to 18. The majority have attended one of the four primary schools in the catchment area; Cults Primary School, Culter School, Lairhillock Primary and Milltimber Primary.

On 28 October 2015 Bailey Gwynne, a 16-year-old pupil, died after being stabbed at the school.

== Head Teachers ==
Head Teachers who have led the school include:

Name	Incumbency
Ross Allan	2023–Present
David Barnett	2019–2023
Anna Muirhead	2004 - 2018
Graeme Traill	1991–2003
Raymond Dunphy	1975–1991

== Houses ==
Pupils are split up into seven different houses each with their own Guidance teacher who offers help, support and takes Social Education classes. The seven houses are named after local areas and landmarks: Cairn, Devenick, Friarsfield, Ronan, Murtle, Blairs and Hillview.

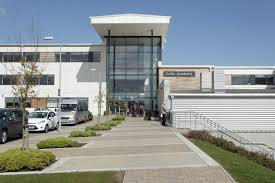
Main entrance

== Notable former pupils ==
- Darren Ferguson - Retired footballer, and current manager of Peterborough United. Son of Sir Alex Ferguson
- Jason White - Scotland rugby union captain.
- Callum McCaig - former Scottish National Party Member of Parliament
- Shaun Maloney - Scotland international footballer.
- Mitchel Megginson - Aberdeen football player.
- Juliet-Jane Horne - Former Miss Scotland, who finished 3rd in Miss World 2001.
- Calvin Goldspink - Former member of S Club 8.
- Robbie Renwick - Swimming finalist (Men's 200m Freestyle & Men's 4 × 200 m Freestyle Relay) at the Beijing Olympics 2008, and won silver (Men's 4 × 200 m Freestyle Relay) for Scotland at the Commonwealth Games 2006.
- Clark Robertson - Scottish footballer who plays for Dundee F.C.
