= Livingston W.F.C. =

Scottish football club

- Full name: Livingston Women's Football Club
- Nicknames: Livi, The Lionesses
- Founded: 2020; 6 years ago
- Ground: Almondvale Stadium, Livingston
- Capacity: 9,713
- Manager: Vacant
- League: SWPL 2
- 2023–24: 3rd
- Website: https://livingstonfc.co.uk
Home colours	Away colours

Livingston Women's Football Club are a Scottish women's football club from Livingston, West Lothian.

== History ==
Livingston Women's FC were formed in 2020, merging with local side Blackburn United. They began competing in the Scottish Women's Football Championship.

They won the Scottish Women's Football Championship in 2022-23.

== Players ==
=== First-team squad ===
As of 4 June 2024 Note: Flags indicate national team as defined under FIFA eligibility rules; some limited exceptions apply. Players may hold more than one non-FIFA nationality.

No.	Pos.	Nation	Player
2	MF	SCO	Lily Park (on loan from Hibs)
3	MF	SCO	Mya Goodman
4	DF	SCO	Rachel Walkingshaw
5	DF	SCO	Summer Laird (on loan from Rangers)
6	MF	SCO	Natasha Frew
7	FW	SCO	Erin Burns
8	MF	SCO	Nina Hegarty
9	FW	SCO	Jen Dodds
10	FW	SCO	Vhairi Munro
11	FW	SCO	Ava Whitson (on loan from Hibs)
12	MF	SCO	Chloe Kean
13	FW	SCO	Lauren Evans

No.	Pos.	Nation	Player
14	FW	SCO	Ellie Osborne (on loan from Hibs)
15	DF	SCO	Elise Macara
16	DF	SCO	Briony Morgan
18	FW	SCO	Ashley Elizabeth
20	FW	SCO	Emma McFadyen
22	MF	SCO	Seren McCulloch
23	MF	SCO	Anna Dickov
24	DF	SCO	Jess Murphy
30	GK	SCO	Rachel Pirie
31	GK	SCO	Schenai Gamrot
32	FW	SCO	Ashley Watson
30	GK	USA	Abbie Ferns

== Club staff ==
=== Coaching staff ===
Role	Name
First Team Head Coach	(Scotland) Vacant
Assistant Coach	(Scotland) Maksymilian Smierzynski
Assistant Coach	(Scotland) Michael Wilson
Assistant Coach	(Scotland) Stewart Plenderleith
Goalkeeping coach	(France) Eric Tshibangu
Strength & Conditioning	(Scotland) Danny Nicoll

== Managerial history ==
Name	Nationality	Years
Paul Jaconelli	(Scotland)	2020-2023
Mike Ross	(Scotland)	2023-2024
Paul Greig	(Scotland)	2024-2025
Craig Joyce	(Scotland)	2025-2026

== Honours ==
=== Senior ===
- Scottish Women's Football Championship: 2022-23
