= Scottish Women's Football =

Sports governing body in Scotland

UEFA
- Founded: 1972
- Website: https://scotwomensfootball.com/

Scottish Women's Football (SWF), formerly known as the Scottish Women’s Football Association (SWFA) between 1972 and 2001, is the governing body for women's association football in Scotland. It is an affiliated national association of the Scottish Football Association (SFA).

In its history, it has run or organised the Scottish Women's Cup, the Scotland women's team, Scottish Women's Football League, Scottish Women's Premier League and other league divisions. It continues to govern the women's and girls' amateur game.

== History ==
Scotland hosted the first organised games of women's football in 1881, and the sport became popular in the 1920s, attracting crowds of thousands. Women's football was banned from English Football Association grounds in 1921; the Scottish Football Association (SFA) did not follow suit, although it was not supportive. The leading team during this era, Rutherglen Ladies F.C., existed from 1921 to 1939.

The SWFA was founded in 1972, when six teams met and decided to form an Association: Aberdeen Prima Donnas, Cambuslang Hooverettes, Dundee Strikers, Edinburgh Dynamos, Westthorn United and Stewarton Thistle.

Initially, the SFA opposed the formation of the SWFA, but in 1974, it recognised the new association. However, the SWFA remained small, with membership in the 1970s peaking at 14 teams. In 1992, it introduced coaching courses, and in 1996 it began organising junior and school football. In 1998, it affiliated to the SFA.

The association stated that its purpose was, "To promote, foster and develop, in all its branches without discrimination against any organisation or person for reason of race, religion or politics, the game of Association Football for women/girls" (2003). Among its aims in 2021 was, "A game that realises the needs, wants and unlimited ambitions of its girls and women."

There was a board restructure in 2014 led by Sheila Begbie, then head of women's football at SFA, who was joined by Vivienne MacLaren as media and communications director and Fiona McIntyre as football director. In 2016 MacLaren became chair of the organisation, while Scottish and Southern Energy became the first ever sponsor of the Scottish Women's Cup

The first ever broadcast deal for Scottish Women's Football was signed with BBC Alba in 2018.

In that same year the SWF board rejected all sponsorship from alcohol and gambling sponsors.

Former Scottish Government sports minister Aileen Campbell was appointed chief executive of Scottish Women's Football in 2021.

Clubs in the Scottish Women's Premier League voted to leave SWF in 2022 and seek greater professionalism under the auspices of the Scottish Professional Football League.

Today Scottish Women's Football still runs over 80 competitions including the following:

- The senior women's pyramid in Scotland below the SWPL. This consistss of two national leagues and five senior regional leagues involving over 80 senior women's teams by the 2026/27 season.
- U14, U16 and U18 leagues in various parts of Scotland.
- Multiple cup competitions, both senior and youth.

== See also ==
- List of women's football clubs in Scotland
- Scottish Women's Football Annual Awards
- Scottish Women's Championship
