= East Fife G.W.F.C. =

Coordinates: 56.201626°N 3.007505°W

East Fife Ladies
- Full name: East Fife Girls and Women's Football Club
- Founded: 2000 (as Kirkland Ladies)
- Ground: King George V Park, Leven
- Chairman: Edward Doig
- League: SWFL 1 North
- 2019: Scottish Women's First Division, 6th
- Website: http://www.eastfifegwfc.co.uk
Home colours	Away colours	Third colours

East Fife Girls and Women's Football Club are a Scottish women's football team based in the Fife coastal town of Leven. The team, established in 2000, were originally named Kirkland Ladies and changed to East Fife Ladies in 2002. They currently compete in the SWPL 2 the second tier of Scottish Women's football.

East Fife won the SWFL North in 2016 and were promoted to the SWPL 2. The team finished in 7th place out of 8 teams in the SWPL 2 in 2017 and were relegated back into the SWFL North for the 2018 season. Following the completion of the 21/22 season East wife finished 2nd in the SWFL championship north and won the play off final winning promotion to the SWPL 2 for the season 22/23.

== Youth ==
The club has an ever expanding youth system with teams at Under 8, Under 10, Under 12, Under 14, Under 16's & Under 19's.

All of the clubs youth teams have an emphasis on developing young players as well as encouraging football to be played the way it should be.

== Personnel ==
Player Manager Liz Anderson
Assistant Coach Charles Dignan
Head Goalkeeping coach & U19's – Aaron Reid
1st Team Goalkeeping coach Mark Grant
Under 8 & Under 10 5's – Caitlin Hay
Under 10 7's – Sean Ferrier & Craig Darge
Under 12's 7's – Sarah Baker & Kenny Hancock
Under 12's 9's – Stuart Hay, Mike Lindsay & Jas Cowie
Under 14's 11's – Johnny Harrow & Dean Harrow
Under 16's 11's – Craig Noble & Alan Lessels
