= 2025–26 Celtic F.C. Women season =

Celtic F.C.
2025–26 season
- Head Coach: Elena Sadiku (until 22 December); Grant Scott (From 22 December)
- Stadium: New Douglas Park
- SWPL 1: 5th
- Scottish Cup: Winners
- SWPL Cup: Semi final
- Top goalscorer: League: Saoirse Noonan (18 goals); All: Saoirse Noonan (26 goals)
Home colours	Away colours	Third colours

The 2025–26 season is Celtic Women's 19th season of competitive football.

== Preseason ==
Celtic played two behind closed door friendlies against Motherwell and Partick Thistle before heading south to a preseason training camp in Newcastle where they faced Sunderland losing 2-0 at Eppleton CW.

== Scottish Women's Premier League ==
The Premier League fixture list was announced on 25 June 2025. Celtic began the league season with an away tie at Oriam against Hearts. After finishing 3rd in the regular season, the post split fixtures were drawn 25 February 2026, with Celtic facing Hibs at home on 15 March 2026 and the final game of the league season coming against Partick Thistle at home on 24 May 2026.

17 August 2025	Hearts	1-2	Celtic	Edinburgh
13:00 BST	Timms 90+1' (pen.)	Report	Cross 21'; Ross 35'	Stadium: Oriam

24 August 2025	Celtic	5-0	Hamilton Academical	Hamilton
14:00 BST	Noonan 26'; Nakao 32'; McAneny 34'; Cross 63'; Dawson 82'	Report		Stadium: New Douglas Park

31 August 2025	Partick Thistle	0-7	Celtic	Glasgow
13:00 BST		Report	Gallacher 26', 50' (pen.); Cross 28', 72'; Ross 30'; Nakao 75'; McAneny 79'	Stadium: Petershill Park

7 September 2025	Celtic	0-2	Rangers	Hamilton
15:05 BST		Report	McAulay 63'; Austin 79'	Stadium: New Douglas Park

14 September 2025	Aberdeen	2-4	Celtic	Cove Bay, Aberdeen
16:10 BST	Stewart 63' (pen.), 75'	Report	Cross 35'; McAneny 71'; Broadick 79' (o.g.); Luke 86'	Stadium: Balmoral Stadium

21 September 2025	Celtic	1-1	Hibernian	Hamilton
16:10 BST	Ross 10'	Report	McGovern 72'	Stadium: New Douglas Park

28 September 2025	Montrose	0-4	Celtic	Montrose
13:00 BST		Report	Gallacher 9', 83'; Noonan 63'; McGoldrick 86'	Stadium: Links Park

12 October 2025	Celtic	7-1	Motherwell	Hamilton
14:00 BST	Cross 26', 70'; Noonan 41', 90'; Lawton 44'; Clark 69'; McAneny 75'	Report	Luke 62' (o.g.)	Stadium: New Douglas Park

19 October 2025	Celtic	1-2	Glasgow City	Hamilton
16:10 BST	Noonan 81'	Report	Määttä 35'; Evans 61'	Stadium: New Douglas Park

31 October 2025	Hamilton Academical	0-3	Celtic	Hamilton
20:00 GMT		Report	Noonan 4'; McAneny 29'; Robertson 50'	Stadium: New Douglas Park

14 November 2025	Rangers	3-2	Celtic	Glasgow
19:30 GMT	Berry 38'; Wilkinson 59'; McAulay 84'	Report	Smith 2'; Noonan 72'	Stadium: Ibrox Stadium

23 November 2025	Celtic	2-0	Partick Thistle	Hamilton
14:00 GMT	Gallacher 26'; McAneny 30'	Report		Stadium: New Douglas Park

14 December 2025	Celtic	4-0	Aberdeen	Hamilton
13:00 GMT	Noonan 2', 22'; Lawton 11'; Gallacher 59'	Report		Stadium: New Douglas Park

21 December 2025	Hibernian	1-2	Celtic	Edinburgh
13:00 GMT	Herron 41'	Report	McAneny 1'; Noonan 56'	Stadium: Meadowbank Stadium

18 January 2026	Motherwell	0-2	Celtic	East Kilbride
16:00 GMT		Report	Walsh 39'; Noonan 44'	Stadium: K-Park Training Academy

25 January 2026	Celtic	1-0	Montrose	Hamilton
13:10 GMT	McAneny 60'	Report		Stadium: New Douglas Park

8 February 2026	Glasgow City	1-1	Celtic	Glasgow
16:10 GMT	Kozlova 62'	Report	Cross 75'	Stadium: Petershill Park

22 February 2026	Celtic	5-3	Hearts	Hamilton
16:10 GMT	Noonan 15', 26', 72'; O'Hanlon 55'; Cross 60'	Report	Shore 50'; Walsh 65' (o.g.); Hutchison 90+6'	Stadium: New Douglas Park

15 March 2026	Celtic	1-1	Hibernian	Hamilton
13:00 GMT	Gallacher 22'	Report	Adams 40'	Stadium: New Douglas Park

18 March 2026	Celtic	1-1	Glasgow City	Hamilton
19:45 GMT	Noonan 56'	Report	Wróbel 81'	Stadium: New Douglas Park

22 March 2026	Partick Thistle	2-3	Celtic	Glasgow
13:00 GMT	Rennie 9'; King 90'	Report	Clark 3', 90+4'; McAneny 78'	Stadium: Petershill Park

1 April 2026	Hearts	4-1	Celtic	Edinburgh
19:00 BST	Rodgers 42' (o.g.); Husband 45+1'; Timms 48' (pen.); Johns 70'	Report	Noonan 58'	Stadium: Oriam

6 April 2026	Celtic	0-3	Rangers	Hamilton
17:10 BST		Report	Wilkinson 15', 40', 90' (pen.)	Stadium: New Douglas Park

24 April 2026	Hibernian	1-0	Celtic	Edinburgh
19:00 BST	Adams 53' (pen.)	Report		Stadium: Meadowbank Stadium

29 April 2026	Glasgow City	1-1	Celtic	Glasgow
19:00 BST	Motlhalo 22'	Report	Craig 38' (pen.)	Stadium: Petershill Park

10 May 2026	Celtic	1-2	Hearts	Hamilton
16:10 BST	Noonan 29' (pen.)	Report	Timms 14'; Wade 43'	Stadium: New Douglas Park

17 May 2026	Rangers	4-0	Celtic	Cumbernauld
16:00 BST	Wilkinson 14' (pen.), 45+5'; Berry 46'; McAulay 82'	Report		Stadium: Broadwood Stadium

24 May 2026	Celtic	1-1	Partick Thistle	Hamilton
13:10 BST	Noonan 6'	Report	Longcake 28'	Stadium: New Douglas Park

== Scottish Women's Cup ==
On 3 November 2025 Celtic were drawn to play Dunfermline Athletic in the 3rd round. Celtic were drawn on 8 December 2025 to play Hibs away with the tie to be played 11 January 2026. Celtic were drawn on 12 January 2026 to play Heart of Midlothian after they defeated their opponents in their postponed 4th round tie. On 16 February 2026 Celtic were drawn to play Glasgow City at Hampden Park in the semi final. Celtic faced Rangers in the final at Hampden Park on 31 May 2026 where they won the trophy for the 3rd time.

7 December 2025 3rd Round	Celtic	14-0	Dunfermline Athletic	Hamilton
12:00 GMT	Cross 9', 59'; Gallacher 10', 45', 75'; Noonan 15', 21', 25', 43'; Luke 39', 41'; Lawton 51'; Clark 63'; Nakao 67'	Report		Stadium: New Douglas Park

11 January 2026 4th Round	Hibernian	2-3	Celtic	Edinburgh
13:00 GMT	Burchill 46'; Adams 50'	Report	Lawton 16'; Cross 45'; McAneny 52'	Stadium: Meadowbank Stadium

15 February 2026 Quarter Final	Hearts	3-4 (a.e.t.)	Celtic	Edinburgh
15:00 GMT	Jardine 38'; Timms 77'; Hutchison 120+2'	Report	Cross 24'; Hunter 45+2' (o.g.); Luke 98'; Lawton 105+1'	Stadium: Oriam

2 May 2026 Semi final	Celtic	3-2 (a.e.t.)	Glasgow City	Glasgow
12:30 BST	Noonan 26'; Gallacher 92'; McGregor 105'	Report	Motlhalo 86'; Grey 120'	Stadium: Hampden Park

31 May 2026 Final	Celtic	1-0	Rangers	Glasgow
14:00 BST	Cross 26'	Report		Stadium: Hampden Park

== Scottish Women's Premier League Cup ==
On 17 July 2025, Celtic were drawn to face Spartans in the Second round of the 2025-26 SWPL Cup.The draw for the quarterfinal took place on 7 October 2025 where Celtic were drawn at home to face Queen's Park. The draw for the semifinals was made on 11 November 2025, with Celtic drawn to face Rangers. As the first team drawn, Rangers will play at home, since a neutral venue will only be used for the final.

5 October 2025 2nd Round	Spartans	1-3	Celtic	Edinburgh
14:00 BST	Young 43'	Report	Courter 5'; Gallacher 18'; Noonan 58'	Stadium: Ainslie Park

9 November 2025 Quarter Final	Celtic	9-1	Queen's Park	Hamilton
12:00 GMT	McAneny 22', 65'; Noonan 31', 44'; Nakao 33'; Cross 39', 45'; Lawton 45+2', 50'	Report	Chomczuk 70'	Stadium: New Douglas Park

1 February 2026 Semi Final	Rangers	3-3 (a.e.t.) (4-2 p)	Celtic	Cumbernauld
13:40 GMT	Wilkinson 51' (pen.); Berry 45', 90+1'	Report	McAneny 16'; Lawton 25'; Pritchard 37' (pen.)	Stadium: Broadwood Stadium
	Penalties
	Wilkinson (penalty scored); Berry (penalty scored); Kim Shin-ji (penalty scored); Brookshire (penalty scored)		(penalty scored) Clark; (penalty missed) Walsh; (penalty scored) Robertson; (penalty missed) McAneny

== Players ==
As of 06 February 2026

Note: Flags indicate national team as defined under FIFA eligibility rules; some limited exceptions apply. Players may hold more than one non-FIFA nationality.

No.	Pos.	Nation	Player
1	GK	SCO	Chloe Logan
2	DF	IRL	Claire Walsh
3	DF	WAL	Amy Richardson
4	MF	SCO	Lisa Robertson
5	MF	SCO	Natalie Ross
6	DF	SCO	Chloe Craig
7	FW	SCO	Amy Gallacher
8	MF	SCO	Jenny Smith
9	FW	ENG	Poppy Pritchard
10	DF	ENG	Evie Rabjohn
11	DF	ENG	Maddi Wilde
14	MF	SCO	Shannon McGregor
15	DF	SCO	Kelly Clark (captain)
16	MF	SWE	Emma Westin
17	FW	SCO	Morgan Cross

No.	Pos.	Nation	Player
18	DF	ENG	Hannah Luke
19	GK	SCO	Lisa Rodgers
20	FW	IRL	Saoirse Noonan
22	DF	IRL	Tara O'Hanlon
23	DF	SCO	Emma Lawton
25	MF	JPN	Momo Nakao
32	MF	SCO	Emma Knox
33	GK	USA	Adelaide Gay
34	MF	SCO	Mirren Duncan
36	MF	IRL	Ruby Morrison
41	MF	SCO	Clare Goldie
46	DF	SCO	Darra Dawson
47	MF	SCO	Sienna McGoldrick
73	MF	SCO	Maria McAneny

=== Players who left during the season ===
Note: Flags indicate national team as defined under FIFA eligibility rules; some limited exceptions apply. Players may hold more than one non-FIFA nationality.

No.	Pos.	Nation	Player
11	MF	CAN	Aislin Streicek
12	DF	USA	Grace Courter

== Player Statistics ==
List of player appearances, substitute appearances in brackets. goals and assists for each competition including totals

Key

Aps = Appearances (Subs)

Gls = Goals

Asts = Assists

Celtic FC Women – 2025–26 Player Statistics by Competition
Player	Position	SWPL 1			Scottish Cup			League Cup			Total Apps	Total Goals	Total Assists
		Aps	Gls	Asts	Aps	Gls	Asts	Aps	Gls	Asts			
Goalkeepers
Chloe Logan	GK	0	0	0	0	0	0	0	0	0	0	0	0
Lisa Rodgers	GK	20	0	0	2	0	0	3	0	0	25	0	0
Adelaide Gay	GK	8	0	0	3	0	0	0	0	0	11	0	0
Defenders
Claire Walsh	DF	26(2)	1	2	3	0	0	2(1)	0	0	31(3)	1	2
Amy Richardson	DF	0(8)	0	2	0(1)	0	0	1(1)	0	0	1(10)	0	2
Chloe Craig	DF	3(5)	1	0	1(1)	0	0	1	0	0	5(6)	1	0
Kelly Clark	DF	28	3	2	4	1	0	4	0	0	36	4	2
Emma Lawton	DF	23(2)	2	7	4	3	1	3(1)	3	1	30(3)	8	9
Darra Dawson	DF	2(7)	1	0	1	0	2	0(2)	0	1	3(9)	1	3
Hannah Luke	DF	14(9)	1	0	4	3	0	4	0	2	22(9)	4	2
Tara O'Hanlon	DF	8(3)	1	0	0(1)	0	0	1	0	1	9(4)	1	1
Maddi Wilde	DF	6(3)	0	0	0(1)	0	0	0(1)	0	0	6(5)	0	0
Midfielders
Evie Rabjohn	MF	9(1)	0	0	1(1)	0	1	1	0	0	11(2)	0	1
Lisa Robertson	MF	25(2)	1	3	4	0	0	3(1)	0	1	32(3)	1	4
Natalie Ross	MF	6(2)	3	1	0	0	0	0	0	0	6(2)	3	1
Jenny Smith	MF	6(5)	1	3	0(4)	0	0	1(2)	0	1	7(11)	1	4
Shannon McGregor	MF	2(4)	0	0	0(1)	0	0	0(1)	1	0	2(6)	1	0
Emma Westin	MF	6(5)	0	2	1(1)	0	0	0(1)	0	0	7(9)	0	2
Momo Nakao	MF	19(9)	2	2	3(1)	1	1	4	1	3	26(10)	4	6
Clare Goldie	MF	0	0	0	0	0	0	0	0	0	0	0	0
Sienna McGoldrick	MF	1(12)	1	0	1	0	1	1(1)	0	0	3(13)	1	1
Maria McAneny	MF	20	9	4	1(2)	1	1	2(1)	3	1	23(3)	13	6
Ruby Morrison	MF	0(1)	0	0	0	0	0	0	0	0	0(1)	0	0
Mirren Duncan	MF	0(1)	0	0	0	0	0	0	0	0	0(1)	0	0
Emma Knox	MF	0(1)	0	0	0(1)	0	0	0	0	0	0(2)	0	0
Forwards
Amy Gallacher	FW	25(2)	7	3	4	3	3	3	2	2	32(2)	12	8
Morgan Cross	FW	18(3)	9	5	4	5	4	2(1)	2	1	24(4)	16	10
Saoirse Noonan	FW	20(3)	18	5	3(1)	4	4	3(1)	4	1	26(5)	26	10
Poppy Pritchard	FW	7(5)	0	1	1(1)	0	0	2	1	0	10(6)	1	1
Departures
Grace Courter	DF	0(5)	0	0	0	0	0	1	1	0	1(5)	1	0
Aislin Streicek	MF	6(4)	0	1	0	0	0	1	0	0	7(4)	0	1

=== Goalscorers ===
R	No.	Pos.	Nation	Name	Premiership	Scottish Cup	League Cup	Total
1	20	FW	(Republic of Ireland)	Saoirse Noonan	18	5	3	26
2	17	FW	(Scotland)	Morgan Cross	9	5	2	16
3	73	MF	(Scotland)	Maria McAneny	9	1	3	13
4	7	FW	(Scotland)	Amy Gallacher	7	4	1	12
5	23	DF	(Scotland)	Emma Lawton	2	3	3	8
6	25	MF	(Japan)	Momo Nakao	2	1	1	4
6	18	DF	(England)	Hannah Luke	1	3	0	4
6	15	DF	(Scotland)	Kelly Clark	3	1	0	4
9	5	MF	(Scotland)	Natalie Ross	3	0	0	3
10	46	DF	(Scotland)	Darra Dawson	1	0	0	1
10	47	MF	(Scotland)	Sienna McGoldrick	1	0	0	1
10	12	DF	(United States)	Grace Courter	0	0	1	1
10	4	MF	(Scotland)	Lisa Robertson	1	0	0	1
10	8	MF	(Scotland)	Jenny Smith	1	0	0	1
10	2	DF	(Republic of Ireland)	Claire Walsh	1	0	0	1
10	9	FW	(England)	Poppy Pritchard	0	0	1	1
10	22	DF	(Republic of Ireland)	Tara O'Hanlon	1	0	0	1
10	6	DF	(Scotland)	Chloe Craig	1	0	0	1
10	14	MF	(Scotland)	Shannon McGregor	0	1	0	1
Own goals					1	1	0	2
Total					61	25	15	101

Last updated: 31 May 2026

=== Hat-tricks ===
Player	Against	Result	Date	Competition
(Republic of Ireland) Saoirse Noonan	(Scotland) Dunfermline Athletic	14-0 (H)	7 December 2025	Scottish Cup
(Republic of Ireland) Saoirse Noonan	(Scotland) Hearts	5-3 (H)	22 February 2026	League
(Scotland) Amy Gallacher	(Scotland) Dunfermline Athletic	14-0 (H)	7 December 2025	Scottish Cup

(H) – Home; (A) – Away; (N) – Neutral

=== Clean sheets ===
As of 31 May 2026.

Rank	Name	Premiership	Scottish Cup	League Cup	Total	Games played
1	(Scotland) Lisa Rodgers	5	0	0	5	25
1	(United States) Adelaide Gay	3	2	0	5	11
Total		8	2	0	10	36

=== Disciplinary record ===
As of match played 31 May 2026

Number	Nation	Position	Name	Premiership		Scottish Cup		League Cup		Total	
Number	Nation	Position	Name	Yellow card	Red card	Yellow card	Red card	Yellow card	Red card	Yellow card	Red card
2	(Republic of Ireland)	DF	Claire Walsh	1	0	1	0	0	0	2	0
4	(Scotland)	MF	Lisa Robertson	3	0	0	0	0	0	3	0
5	(Scotland)	MF	Natalie Ross	1	0	0	0	0	0	1	0
6	(Scotland)	MF	Chloe Craig	0	1	0	0	0	0	0	1
7	(Scotland)	FW	Amy Gallacher	3	0	1	0	0	0	4	0
9	(England)	MF	Poppy Pritchard	0	0	1	0	1	0	2	0
10	(England)	FW	Evie Rabjohn	1	0	0	0	0	0	1	0
11	(England)	DF	Maddi Wilde	0	1	0	0	0	0	0	1
11	(Canada)	DF	Aislin Streicek	1	0	0	0	0	0	1	0
14	(Scotland)	DF	Shannon McGregor	1	0	0	0	0	0	1	0
15	(Scotland)	DF	Kelly Clark	3	0	0	0	0	0	3	0
18	(England)	DF	Hannah Luke	1	0	0	0	0	0	1	0
19	(Scotland)	GK	Lisa Rodgers	2	0	0	0	0	0	2	0
20	(Republic of Ireland)	FW	Saoirse Noonan	0	0	1	0	1	0	2	0
22	(Republic of Ireland)	DF	Tara O'Hanlon	1	0	0	0	0	0	1	0
23	(Scotland)	DF	Emma Lawton	7	0	2	1	1	0	10	1
25	(Japan)	MF	Momo Nakao	0	0	1	0	0	0	1	0
46	(Scotland)	DF	Darra Dawson	1	0	0	0	0	0	1	0
47	(Scotland)	MF	Sienna McGoldrick	1	0	0	0	1	0	2	0
73	(Scotland)	MF	Maria McAneny	2	0	0	0	0	0	2	0
			TOTALS	29	2	7	1	4	0	40	3

== Team Statistics ==
=== League Table ===
==== Regular season ====
Pos	Team	Pld	W	D	L	GF	GA	GD	Pts	Qualification
1	Glasgow City	18	14	4	0	49	6	+43	46	Advances to the Championship Round
2	Rangers	18	13	2	3	62	16	+46	41	Advances to the Championship Round
3	Celtic	18	13	2	3	53	17	+36	41	Advances to the Championship Round
4	Heart of Midlothian	18	13	1	4	65	21	+44	40	Advances to the Championship Round
5	Hibernian	18	10	4	4	47	15	+32	34	Advances to the Championship Round
6	Partick Thistle	18	5	2	11	13	47	−34	17	Advances to the Championship Round
7	Montrose	18	4	3	11	17	52	−35	15	Participates in the Relegation Round
8	Motherwell	18	3	2	13	15	45	−30	11	Participates in the Relegation Round
9	Aberdeen	18	3	2	13	17	48	−31	11	Participates in the Relegation Round
10	Hamilton Academical	18	0	2	16	8	79	−71	2	Participates in the Relegation Round

Updated to match(es) played on 22 February 2026. Source:
Rules for classification: 1) Points; 2) Head-to-head record; 3) Head-to-head goal difference; 4) Head-to-head goals scored; 5) Goal difference in the post-split phase; 6) Goals scored in the post-split phase; 7) Number of wins in the post-split phase; 8) Number of wins across the full season; 9) Goal difference across the season; 10) Goals scored across the season;

==== Championship Round ====
Pos	Team	Pld	W	D	L	GF	GA	GD	Pts	Qualification
1	Heart of Midlothian	28	20	2	6	85	31	+54	62	Qualified for Champions league qualifying, champions path
2	Rangers	28	19	3	6	80	29	+51	60	Qualified for Champions league qualifying, league path
3	Glasgow City	28	17	7	4	65	14	+51	58	
4	Hibernian	28	16	7	5	62	23	+39	55	
5	Celtic	28	14	6	8	62	37	+25	48	
6	Partick Thistle	28	5	4	19	18	71	−53	19	

Updated to match(es) played on 25 May 2026. Source: SWPL.uk
Rules for classification: 1) Points; 2) Head-to-head record; 3) Head-to-head goal difference; 4) Head-to-head goals scored; 5) Goal difference in the post-split phase; 6) Goals scored in the post-split phase; 7) Number of wins in the post-split phase; 8) Number of wins across the full season; 9) Goal difference across the season; 10) Goals scored across the season;

=== Results by Round ===
==== Regular season ====
Round	1	2	3	4	5	6	7	8	9	10	11	12	13	14	15	16	17	18
Ground	A	H	A	H	A	H	A	H	H	A	A	H	H	A	A	H	A	H
Result	W	W	W	L	W	D	W	W	L	W	L	W	W	W	W	W	D	W
Position	4	2	1	2	2	3	3	2	4	3	5	4	4	4	3	2	4	3

Updated to match(es) played on 22 February 2026. Source: Matches
A = Away; H = Home; W = Win; D = Draw; L = Loss; P = Postponed

==== Championship round ====
Round	1	2	3	4	5	6	7	8	9	10
Ground	H	H	A	A	H	A	A	H	A	H
Result	D	D	W	L	L	L	D	L	L	D
Position	3	3	2	4	4	5	4	5	5	5

Updated to match(es) played on 25 May 2026. Source: Matches
A = Away; H = Home; W = Win; D = Draw; L = Loss; P = Postponed

== Transfers ==
=== In ===
Date	Pos	Player	From	Type	Window	Fee
15 July 2025	MF	(Scotland) Lisa Robertson	(Scotland) Hearts	Transfer	Summer	Free
24 July 2025	DF	(Republic of Ireland) Claire Walsh	(Scotland) Glasgow City	Transfer	Summer	Free
16 August 2025	DF	(Canada) Aislin Streicek	(United States) Boston College	Transfer	Summer	Free
16 August 2025	GK	(United States) Adelaide Gay	(United States) DC Power FC	Transfer	Summer	Free
28 August 2025	DF	(United States) Grace Courter	(United States) Boston College	Transfer	Summer	Free
10 September 2025	DF	(England) Hannah Luke	(England) Blackburn Rovers	Transfer	Summer	Free
23 January 2026	DF	(Republic of Ireland) Tara O'Hanlon	(England) Manchester City	Loan	Winter	N/A
23 January 2026	FW	(England) Poppy Pritchard	(England) Manchester City	Loan	Winter	N/A
6 February 2026	DF	(England) Evie Rabjohn	(England) Manchester United	Transfer	Winter	Free
6 February 2026	DF	(England) Maddi Wilde	(England) London City Lionesses	Loan	Winter	N/A

=== Out ===
Date	Pos	Player	To	Type	Window	Fee
3 June 2025	DF	(Scotland) Olivia McStay	(Scotland) Hamilton Academical	Transfer	Summer	Free
6 June 2025	GK	(Scotland) Erin Halliday	(Scotland) Hamilton Academical	Transfer	Summer	Free
16 June 2025	MF	(Scotland) Maisie Stewart	(Scotland) Dundee United	Transfer	Summer	Free
20 June 2025	FW	(United States) Murphy Agnew	(France) RC Strasbourg	Released	Summer	Free
20 June 2025	FW	(United States) Kit Loferski	(Cyprus) Apollon Limassol	Transfer	Summer	Free
20 June 2025	DF	(Argentina) Luana Muñoz	(Cyprus) Apollon Limassol	Transfer	Summer	Free
20 June 2025	MF	(Scotland) Colette Cavanagh	(Spain) RC Deportivo	Transfer	Summer	Free
20 June 2025	MF	(England) Lucy Ashworth-Clifford	(Italy) Lazio	Released	Summer	Free
20 June 2025	DF	(Portugal) Bruna Lourenço	(France) RC Strasbourg	Transfer	Summer	Free
20 June 2025	MF	(Denmark) Mathilde Carstens	(Denmark) Brøndby IF	Transfer	Summer	Free
9 July 2025	GK	(United States) Kelsey Daugherty	(United States) Brooklyn FC	Transfer	Summer	Free
9 July 2025	DF	(France) Celya Barclais	(Spain) FC Badalona	Transfer	Summer	Free
9 July 2025	FW	(Scotland) Abi Harrison	(Scotland) Glasgow City	Transfer	Summer	Free
6 July 2025	MF	(Scotland) Lucy Barclay	(Scotland) Hamilton Academical	Transfer	Summer	Free
7 August 2025	DF	(Scotland) Sophie Timlin	(Scotland) Gartcairn	Transfer	Summer	Free
7 October 2025	GK	(Scotland) Chloe Logan	(Scotland) Motherwell	Loan	N/A	N/A
8 October 2025	GK	(Scotland) Ailey Tebbett	(Scotland) Gartcairn	Loan	N/A	N/A
23 November 2025	DF	(United States) Grace Courter	N/A	Released	N/A	Free
23 November 2025	MF	(Canada) Aislin Streicek	N/A	Released	N/A	Free
22 February 2026	MF	(Scotland) Sienna McGoldrick	(Scotland) Partick Thistle	Loan	N/A	N/A
26 May 2026	GK	(Scotland) Chloe Logan	N/A	Released	N/A	N/A
