= 2024–25 Celtic F.C. Women season =

Celtic F.C.
2024–25 season
- Manager: Elena Sadiku
- Stadium: Excelsior Stadium (Until 29 September); New Douglas Park (From 30 September)
- SWPL 1: 4th
- Scottish Cup: 4th Round
- SWPL Cup: Semi-finals
- Top goalscorer: League: Saoirse Noonan (25 goals); All: Saoirse Noonan (31 goals)
Home colours	Away colours	Third colours

The 2024–25 season was Celtic Women's 18th season of competitive football.

== Pre-season and friendlies ==
Celtic traveled to Stockholm in Sweden for a pre-season training camp where they would play in two friendly matches in preparation for their UEFA Women's Champions League Qualifying matches.

3 August 2024 Friendly	Djurgårdens	1-2	Celtic	Stockholm
	Johansson 78'	Report	Hayes 88'; Noonan 90'	Stadium: Stockholm Olympic Stadium

7 August 2024 Friendly	Hammarby	3-0	Celtic	Tyresö Municipality
	Hasund 18'; Wangerheim 29'; Lennartsson 54'	Report		Stadium: Tyresövallen

== Scottish Women's Premier League ==
The Premier League fixture list was announced on 27 June 2024. Celtic began their title defence against Dundee Utd at Celtic Park.

10 August 2024	Celtic	9-0	Dundee United	Glasgow
	Ashworth-Clifford 25'; Noonan 28', 55'; Smith 45+1'; Lourenço 50'; Gallacher 51'; S. Carstens 64'; McAneny 84', 88'	Report		Stadium: Celtic Park

18 August 2024	Celtic	1-0	Glasgow City	Airdrie
	Craig 53' (pen.)	Report		Stadium: Excelsior Stadium

21 August 2024	Celtic	5-1	Motherwell	Airdrie
	Noonan 3'; Ashworth-Clifford 24'; Gallacher 30'; Agnew 76'; McAneny 79'	Report	Cross 58'	Stadium: Excelsior Stadium

25 August 2024	Aberdeen	0-4	Celtic	Cove Bay, Aberdeen
		Report	Agnew 4'; Gallacher 20'; Smith 48'; M. Carstens 66'	Stadium: Balmoral Stadium

30 August 2024	Celtic	0-0	Hibernian	Airdrie
		Report		Stadium: Excelsior Stadium

15 September 2024	Partick Thistle	0-3	Celtic	Glasgow
		Report	McGregor 2', 61'; Agnew 31'	Stadium: Kirkintilloch Community Sports Complex

19 September 2024	Montrose	2-4	Celtic	Montrose
	Codegoni 52'; Brown 70'	Report	Noonan 14', 45+3', 82'; McAneny 21'	Stadium: Links Park

3 October 2024	Rangers	2-2	Celtic	Cumbernauld
	Howat 5'; Wilkinson 64' (pen.)	Report	Noonan 69' (pen.); Barclais 87'	Stadium: Broadwood Stadium

13 October 2024	Hearts	1-0	Celtic	Edinburgh
	McAneny 35' (o.g.)	Report		Stadium: Oriam

20 October 2024	Celtic	1-0	Spartans	Hamilton
	Cross 9'	Report		Stadium: New Douglas Park

3 November 2024	Motherwell	0-4	Celtic	East Kilbride
		Report	Lawton 11'; Noonan 33'; Watson 39' (o.g.); Ashworth-Clifford 50'	Stadium: K-Park Training Academy

6 November 2024	Celtic	5-0	Queen's Park	Hamilton
	Agnew 8'; Clark 22'; Hay 25' (o.g.); Ashworth-Clifford 26'; Cross 84'	Report		Stadium: New Douglas Park

17 November 2024	Celtic	2-3	Rangers	Hamilton
	Hayes 43'; Noonan 67'	Report	Hardy 4'; Wilkinson 62' (pen.); Cornet 78'	Stadium: New Douglas Park

24 November 2024	Celtic	5-1	Montrose	Hamilton
	Gallacher 20'; Noonan 56', 58', 81'; Lawton 61'	Report	Brown 12'	Stadium: New Douglas Park

22 December 2024	Spartans	0-5	Celtic	Edinburgh
		Report	Lawton 17', 88'; Noonan 27', 82' (pen.); Clark 36'	Stadium: Ainslie Park

12 January 2025	Celtic	4-2	Partick Thistle	Hamilton
	Noonan 7', 73'; Clark 80'; McAneny 83'	Report	Boyce 58'; Falconer 90'	Stadium: New Douglas Park

15 January 2025	Celtic	8-0	Aberdeen	Hamilton
	Hayes 2', 45+3'; Noonan 7', 37'; Gallacher 70' (pen.); Lawton 58'; Clark 75'; Smith 90+2'	Report		Stadium: New Douglas Park

26 January 2025	Celtic	4-0	Hearts	Hamilton
	McGregor 7'; Noonan 36'; Cross 43'; Ross 60'	Report		Stadium: New Douglas Park

29 January 2025	Queen's Park	0-6	Celtic	Stenhousemuir
		Report	Noonan 14', 37'; Cavanagh 43'; McGregor 52'; M. Carstens 62'; McAneny 79'	Stadium: Ochilview Park

7 February 2025	Dundee United	0-8	Celtic	Dundee
		Report	McAneny 2', 88' (pen.); Smith 6', 73'; Harrison 18', 41', 58'; Loferski 85'	Stadium: Tannadice Park

14 February 2025	Glasgow City	2-2	Celtic	Glasgow
	Muir 24'; Kozlova 29'	Report	Gallacher 1'; McAneny 52'	Stadium: Petershill Park

2 March 2025	Hibernian	1-0	Celtic	Edinburgh
	Adams 23'	Report		Stadium: Meadowbank Stadium

16 March 2025	Hearts	3-1	Celtic	Edinburgh
	Brownlie 9'; Timms 56', 65'	Report	Noonan 62'	Stadium: Oriam

28 March 2025	Celtic	1-2	Glasgow City	Hamilton
	Noonan 59'	Report	Lovera 23'; Smit 86'	Stadium: New Douglas Park

13 April 2025	Rangers	1-1	Celtic	Glasgow
	Howat 9'	Report	Gallacher 71'	Stadium: Ibrox Stadium

16 April 2025	Celtic	0-0	Hibernian	Hamilton
		Report		Stadium: New Douglas Park

20 April 2025	Motherwell	0-1	Celtic	East Kilbride
		Report	McAneny 64'	Stadium: K-Park Training Academy

30 April 2025	Celtic	2-1	Hearts	Hamilton
	Gallacher 52'; McAneny 90+3'	Report	Lourenço 40' (o.g.)	Stadium: New Douglas Park

4 May 2025	Glasgow City	3-1	Celtic	Glasgow
	Kozlova 24', 30'; Lovera 45'	Report	Ashworth-Clifford 54'	Stadium: Petershill Park

11 May 2025	Celtic	0-1	Rangers	Hamilton
		Report	Howat 12'	Stadium: New Douglas Park

14 May 2025	Hibernian	4-2	Celtic	Edinburgh
	Grant 5'; McGovern 16', 25'; Adams 50'	Report	Noonan 43'; Lourenço 79'	Stadium: Meadowbank Stadium

18 May 2025	Celtic	6-0	Motherwell	Glasgow
	Ashworth-Clifford 5', 35'; McAneny 7', 56'; Cross 68'; Noonan 79'	Report		Stadium: Celtic Park

== Scottish Women's Cup ==
On 4 November 2024, Celtic were drawn to face Glasgow Women in the third round of the 2024-25 Scottish Women's Cup, On 9 December 2024, Celtic were drawn to face Glasgow City in the fourth round.

8 December 2024 3rd Round	Glasgow Women	0-13	Celtic	Coatbridge
		Report	Kerner 8', 16', 39'; McAneny 11', 75', 81'; Muñoz 13', 72'; M. Carstens 18', 57'; Cavanagh 30'; Noonan 60'; Cross 83'	Stadium: Cliftonhill Stadium

2 February 2025 4th Round	Glasgow City	3-2	Celtic	Glasgow
	Lovera 26', 54' van Diemen 49'	Report	Ashworth-Clifford 19'; Walsh 32' (o.g.)	Stadium: Petershill Park

== Scottish Women's Premier League Cup ==
On 8 July 2024, Celtic were drawn to face Montrose in the Second round of the 2024-25 SWPL Cup, On 1 October 2024, Celtic were drawn to face Glasgow City in the quarter-finals. On 12 November 2024, Celtic were drawn to face Rangers in the semi-finals.

29 September 2024 2nd round	Montrose	0-7	Celtic	Montrose
		Report	M. Carstens 18'; Noonan 23', 27'; Loferski 35', 46'; Barclais 77'; Cross 87'	Stadium: Links Park

10 November 2024 Quarter final	Celtic	0-0 (a.e.t.) (4-3 p)	Glasgow City	Hamilton
		Report		Stadium: New Douglas Park
	Penalties
	Clark (penalty scored); McAneny (penalty missed); McGregor (penalty scored); Agnew (penalty scored); Ross (penalty scored)		(penalty scored) Lauder; (penalty scored) Evans; (penalty missed) Wróbel; (penalty scored) Määttä; (penalty missed) Kozlova

19 January 2025 Semi final	Celtic	1-2	Rangers	Hamilton
	Lawton 90+1'	Report	Hardy 47'; Wilkinson 51'	Stadium: New Douglas Park

== UEFA Champions League ==
Celtic entered the Champions League at qualifying round 1 in the Champions path where they were unseeded.

=== Round 1 Qualifying ===
On 5 July 2024 Celtic were drawn in mini tournament 3 of the Champions path hosted by Gintra where they defeated KuPS in the semi final before facing Gintra in the final after they defeated Agarista Anenii Noi in the other semi final in the mini tournament.

4 September 2024 Semi final	KuPS	1-3 (a.e.t.)	Celtic	Šiauliai
11:00	Ariyo 18'	Report	Noonan 63', 91', 97'	Stadium: Savivaldybė Stadium; Attendance: 135

7 September 2024 final	Gintra	0-2	Celtic	Šiauliai
17:00		Report	McGregor 21'; Loferski 81'	Stadium: Savivaldybė Stadium; Attendance: 950

=== Round 2 Qualifying ===
On 9 September 2024 Celtic were drawn to play a two legged knockout tie against Vorskla Poltava from Ukraine. Due to the situation in their home country Vorskla Poltava played both matches in Scotland with the winner qualifying for the UEFA Champions League group stage.

22 September 2024 Round 2	Vorskla Poltava	0-1	Celtic	Airdrie
13:00		Report	Agnew 5'	Stadium: Excelsior Stadium; Attendance: 744

26 September 2024 Rond 2	Celtic	2-0	Vorskla Poltava	Airdrie
20:15	Lawton 52'; McGregor 63'	Report		Stadium: Excelsior Stadium; Attendance: 1149

=== Group Stage ===
Celtic were seeded in Pot 4 of the UEFA Women's Champions League where they became the first Scottish side to play in the group stage of the competition. On 27 September 2024 they were drawn in Group B where they faced Chelsea, Real Madrid and Twente.

8 October 2024 Match 1	Celtic	0-2	FC Twente	Hamilton
20:00 BST		Report	van Dooren 44', 85'	Stadium: New Douglas Park; Attendance: 2784

17 October 24 Match 2	Real Madrid	4-0	Celtic	Madrid
17:45 BST	Weir 7'; Bruun 72'; Møller 80'; Caicedo 83' (pen.)	Report		Stadium: Alfredo Di Stéfano Stadium; Attendance: 1139

13 November 2024 Match 3	Celtic	1-2	Chelsea	Glasgow
20:00 BST	Agnew 5'	Report	Hamano 28'; Lawrence 32'	Stadium: Celtic Park; Attendance: 7390

20 November 2024 Match 4	Chelsea	3-0	Celtic	Fulham
20:00 BST	Bronze 2'; Kaptein 25'; Périsset 90+5' (pen.)	Report		Stadium: Stamford Bridge; Attendance: 3931

11 December 2024 Match 5	Celtic	0-3	Real Madrid	Hamilton
20:00 BST		Report	Bruun 30', 71'; Redondo 85'	Stadium: New Douglas Park; Attendance: 1314

17 December 2024 Match 6	Twente	3-0	Celtic	Enschede
17:45 BST	van Dooren 20', 34'; Ross 43' (o.g.)	Report		Stadium: De Grolsch Veste; Attendance: 2893

== Players ==
As of 19 May 2025

Note: Flags indicate national team as defined under FIFA eligibility rules; some limited exceptions apply. Players may hold more than one non-FIFA nationality.

No.	Pos.	Nation	Player
1	GK	SCO	Chloe Logan
2	DF	FRA	Celya Barclais
3	DF	WAL	Amy Richardson
5	MF	SCO	Natalie Ross
6	DF	SCO	Chloe Craig
7	FW	SCO	Amy Gallacher
8	MF	SCO	Jenny Smith
9	FW	SCO	Abi Harrison
10	MF	DEN	Mathilde Carstens
11	MF	SCO	Colette Cavanagh
12	FW	USA	Murphy Agnew
14	MF	SCO	Shannon McGregor
15	DF	SCO	Kelly Clark (captain)
16	MF	SWE	Emma Westin

No.	Pos.	Nation	Player
17	FW	SCO	Morgan Cross
18	DF	IRL	Caitlin Hayes
19	GK	SCO	Lisa Rodgers
20	FW	IRL	Saoirse Noonan
21	FW	USA	Kit Loferski
22	MF	ENG	Lucy Ashworth-Clifford
23	DF	SCO	Emma Lawton
24	DF	POR	Bruna Lourenço
25	MF	JPN	Momo Nakao
30	GK	USA	Kelsey Daugherty
41	MF	SCO	Clare Goldie
46	DF	SCO	Darra Dawson
67	DF	ARG	Luana Muñoz
73	MF	SCO	Maria McAneny

=== Players who left during the season ===
Note: Flags indicate national team as defined under FIFA eligibility rules; some limited exceptions apply. Players may hold more than one non-FIFA nationality.

No.	Pos.	Nation	Player
9	MF	DEN	Signe Carstens
16	DF	USA	Hana Kerner

== Player Statistics ==
=== Appearances and goals ===
List of player appearances, substitute appearances in brackets. goals and assists for each competition including totals

Key

Aps = Appearances (Subs)

Gls = Goals

Asts = Assists

Celtic FC Women – 2024–25 Player Statistics by Competition
Player	Position	SWPL 1			Scottish Cup			League Cup			UEFA Women's Champions League			Total Apps	Total Goals	Total Assists
		Aps	Gls	Asts	Aps	Gls	Asts	Aps	Gls	Asts	Aps	Gls	Asts			
Chloe Logan	GK	3	0	0	1	0	0	1	0	0	0	0	0	5	0	0
Lisa Rodgers	GK	6	0	0	0	0	0	1	0	0	1	0	0	8	0	0
Kelsey Daugherty	GK	23	0	0	1	0	0	1	0	0	9	0	0	34	0	0
Celya Barclais	DF	18(4)	1	2	1(1)	0	0	2(1)	1	0	7(1)	0	1	28(7)	2	3
Amy Richardson	DF	1(2)	0	0	0(1)	0	0	1	0	0	0	0	0	2(3)	0	0
Chloe Craig	DF	3	1	0	0	0	0	0	0	0	0	0	0	3	1	0
Kelly Clark	DF	30(1)	4	3	1	0	0	3	0	0	10	0	0	44(1)	4	3
Caitlin Hayes	DF	14(1)	3	2	0	0	0	1	0	0	9(1)	0	1	24(2)	3	3
Emma Lawton	DF	23(2)	5	7	1(1)	0	0	2	1	0	7(1)	1	0	33(4)	7	7
Bruna Lourenço	DF	19(3)	2	1	1	0	0	2	0	2	7	0	0	29(3)	2	3
Luana Muñoz	DF	2(5)	0	2	1	2	0	0(1)	0	0	0(1)	0	0	3(7)	2	2
Darra Dawson	DF	0(2)	0	0	1	0	1	0	0	0	0	0	0	1(2)	0	1
Hana Kerner	DF	2(4)	0	0	1	3	0	0	0	0	2(3)	0	0	5(7)	3	0
Emma Westin	MF	1(1)	0	1	0	0	0	0	0	0	0	0	0	1(1)	0	1
Natalie Ross	MF	17(4)	1	2	1	0	0	1(1)	0	0	7(2)	0	0	26(7)	1	2
Jenny Smith	MF	12(11)	5	5	1	0	0	1(1)	0	0	2(6)	0	1	16(18)	5	6
Signe Carstens	MF	7(2)	1	2	1	0	1	1	0	0	2(4)	0	0	11(6)	1	3
Mathilde Carstens	MF	11(13)	2	5	1(1)	2	1	2	1	1	3(3)	0	0	17(17)	5	7
Colette Cavanagh	MF	10(14)	1	6	1(1)	1	1	1(1)	0	0	5(1)	0	0	17(17)	2	7
Shannon McGregor	MF	16(8)	4	2	1	0	0	2(1)	0	1	8(2)	2	1	27(11)	6	4
Lucy Ashworth-Clifford	MF	24(4)	7	12	1	1	0	1(1)	0	0	9	0	1	35(5)	8	13
Momo Nakao	MF	9(1)	0	0	0	0	0	0	0	0	0	0	0	9(1)	0	0
Clare Goldie	MF	2	0	0	0	0	0	0	0	0	1(1)	0	0	3(1)	0	0
Maria McAneny	MF	16(12)	13	7	2	3	2	1(2)	0	0	0(7)	0	0	19(21)	16	9
Amy Gallacher	FW	24(6)	8	3	0	0	0	2	0	0	8(1)	0	2	34(7)	8	5
Murphy Agnew	FW	16(9)	4	5	1(1)	0	1	1(1)	0	1	8(1)	2	1	26(12)	6	8
Morgan Cross	FW	12(9)	4	7	1(1)	1	0	2(1)	1	0	2(4)	0	0	17(15)	6	7
Saoirse Noonan	FW	24(5)	25	1	2	1	3	3	2	1	3(6)	3	0	32(11)	31	5
Kit Loferski	FW	4(14)	1	1	0(1)	0	0	0(1)	2	0	0(4)	1	1	4(20)	4	2
Abi Harrison	FW	3(10)	3	0	0(1)	0	0	0	0	0	0	0	0	3(11)	3	0

=== Goalscorers ===
R	No.	Pos.	Nation	Name	Premiership	Scottish Cup	League Cup	Champions League	Total
1	20	FW	(Republic of Ireland)	Saoirse Noonan	25	1	2	3	31
2	73	MF	(Scotland)	Maria McAneny	13	3	0	0	16
3	7	FW	(Scotland)	Amy Gallacher	8	0	0	0	8
3	22	MF	(England)	Lucy Ashworth-Clifford	7	1	0	0	8
5	23	DF	(Scotland)	Emma Lawton	5	0	1	1	7
6	14	MF	(Scotland)	Shannon McGregor	4	0	0	2	6
6	12	FW	(United States)	Murphy Agnew	4	0	0	2	6
6	17	FW	(Scotland)	Morgan Cross	4	1	1	0	6
9	8	MF	(Scotland)	Jenny Smith	5	0	0	0	5
9	10	MF	(Denmark)	Mathilde Carstens	2	2	1	0	5
11	15	DF	(Scotland)	Kelly Clark	4	0	0	0	4
11	21	FW	(United States)	Kit Loferski	1	0	2	1	4
13	18	DF	(Republic of Ireland)	Caitlin Hayes	3	0	0	0	3
13	16	DF	(United States)	Hana Kerner	0	3	0	0	3
13	9	FW	(Scotland)	Abi Harrison	3	0	0	0	3
16	2	DF	(France)	Celya Barclais	1	0	1	0	2
16	24	DF	(Portugal)	Bruna Lourenço	2	0	0	0	2
16	67	DF	(Argentina)	Luana Muñoz	0	2	0	0	2
16	11	MF	(Scotland)	Colette Cavanagh	1	1	0	0	2
20	6	DF	(Scotland)	Chloe Craig	1	0	0	0	1
20	5	MF	(Scotland)	Natalie Ross	1	0	0	0	1
20	9	MF	(Denmark)	Signe Carstens	1	0	0	0	1
Own goals					2	1	0	0	3
Total					97	15	8	9	129

Last updated: 24 May 2025

=== Hat-tricks ===
Player	Against	Result	Date	Competition
(Republic of Ireland) Saoirse Noonan	(Finland) KuPS	3-1 (N)	4 September 2024	Champions League
(Republic of Ireland) Saoirse Noonan	(Scotland) Montrose	4-2 (A)	19 September 2024	League
(Republic of Ireland) Saoirse Noonan	(Scotland) Montrose	5-1 (H)	24 November 2024	League
(United States) Hana Kerner	(Scotland) Glasgow Women	13-0 (A)	8 December 2024	Scottish Cup
(Scotland) Maria McAneny	(Scotland) Glasgow Women	13-0 (A)	8 December 2024	Scottish Cup
(Scotland) Abi Harrison	(Scotland) Dundee Utd	8-0 (A)	7 February 2025	League

(H) – Home; (A) – Away; (N) – Neutral

=== Clean sheets ===
As of 24 May 2025.

Rank	Name	Premiership	Scottish Cup	League Cup	Champions League	Total	Played Games
1	(United States) Kelsey Daugherty	11	0	1	3	15	34
2	(Scotland) Lisa Rodgers	3	0	1	0	4	8
3	(Scotland) Chloe Logan	2	1	0	0	3	5
Total		16	1	2	3	22	47

== Team Statistics ==
=== League tables ===
==== Regular season ====
Pos	Team	Pld	W	D	L	GF	GA	GD	Pts	Qualification
1	Glasgow City	22	17	3	2	90	10	+80	54	Advances to the championship round
2	Hibernian	22	17	3	2	71	14	+57	54	Advances to the championship round
3	Rangers	22	16	4	2	112	18	+94	52	Advances to the championship round
4	Celtic	22	16	3	3	82	15	+67	51	Advances to the championship round
5	Heart of Midlothian	22	14	4	4	73	14	+59	46	Advances to the championship round
6	Motherwell	22	10	2	10	51	46	+5	32	Advances to the championship round
7	Partick Thistle	22	5	9	8	29	39	−10	24	Participates in the relegation round
8	Aberdeen	22	6	3	13	20	81	−61	21	Participates in the relegation round
9	Spartans	22	5	2	15	23	58	−35	17	Participates in the relegation round
10	Montrose	22	4	2	16	22	82	−60	14	Participates in the relegation round
11	Queen's Park	22	2	2	18	10	101	−91	8	Participates in the relegation round
12	Dundee United	22	1	1	20	14	119	−105	4	Participates in the relegation round

Updated to match(es) played on 2 March 2025. Source: SWPL.uk
Rules for classification: 1) Points; 2) Goal difference; 3) Number of goals scored;

==== Championship Round ====
Pos	Team	Pld	W	D	L	GF	GA	GD	Pts	Qualification
1	Hibernian (C)	32	24	5	3	90	21	+69	77	Qualified for Champions league qualifying, champions path
2	Glasgow City	32	23	5	4	107	18	+89	74	Qualified for Champions league qualifying, league path
3	Rangers	32	22	5	5	139	27	+112	71	
4	Celtic	32	19	5	8	97	30	+67	62	
5	Heart of Midlothian	32	18	5	9	91	32	+59	59	
6	Motherwell	32	10	2	20	52	86	−34	32	

Updated to match(es) played on 18 May 2025. Source: SWPL.uk
Rules for classification: 1) Points; 2) Goal difference; 3) Number of goals scored;
(C) Champions

=== Results by Round ===
==== Regular season ====
Round	1	2	3	4	5	6	7	8	9	10	11	12	13	14	15	16	17	18	19	20	21	22
Ground	H	H	H	A	H	A	A	A	H	A	H	A	H	H	A	H	A	H	H	A	A	A
Result	W	W	W	W	D	D	W	W	W	L	W	W	L	W	W	W	W	W	W	W	D	L
Position	3	3	2	3	3	4	4	3	3	4	4	4	5	4	4	4	3	3	3	3	4	4

Updated to match(es) played on 2 March 2025. Source: Matches
A = Away; H = Home; W = Win; D = Draw; L = Loss; P = Postponed

==== Championship round ====
Round	1	2	3	4	5	6	7	8	9	10
Ground	A	H	A	H	A	H	A	H	A	H
Result	L	L	D	D	W	W	L	L	L	W
Position	4	4	5	5	5	4	4	5	5	4

Updated to match(es) played on 18 May 2025. Source: Matches
A = Away; H = Home; W = Win; D = Draw; L = Loss; P = Postponed

== Transfers ==
=== In ===
Date	Pos	Player	From	Type	Window	Fee
7 June 2024	MF	(Scotland) Shannon McGregor	(Scotland) Hibernian	Transfer	Summer	Free
10 June 2024	DF	(Wales) Amy Richardson	(England) Everton	Transfer	Summer	Free
12 June 2024	MF	(Denmark) Signe Carstens	(Denmark) Fortuna Hjørring	Transfer	Summer	Free
12 June 2024	MF	(Denmark) Mathilde Carstens	(Denmark) Fortuna Hjørring	Transfer	Summer	Free
13 June 2024	DF	(Portugal) Bruna Lourenço	(Portugal) Sporting CP	Transfer	Summer	Free
19 July 2024	FW	(Republic of Ireland) Saoirse Noonan	(England) Durham	Transfer	Summer	Free
12 September 2024	DF	(Scotland) Emma Lawton	(Scotland) Partick Thistle	Transfer	Summer	Free
12 September 2024	FW	(Scotland) Morgan Cross	(Scotland) Motherwell	Transfer	Summer	Free
17 January 2025	MF	(Sweden) Emma Westin	(Sweden) Hammarby IF	Transfer	Winter	Free
23 January 2025	FW	(Scotland) Abi Harrison	(England) Bristol City	Transfer	Winter	Free
31 January 2025	MF	(Japan) Momo Nakao	(United States) University of Memphis	Transfer	Winter	Free

=== Out ===
Date	Pos	Player	To	Type	Window	Fee
21 May 2024	MF	(Spain) Paula Partido	(Spain) Real Madrid	Loan ended	Summer	N/A
4 June 2024	FW	(England) Natasha Flint	(England) Liverpool	Loan ended	Summer	N/A
12 June 2024	MF	(Japan) Shen Menglu	(Germany) Bayer Leverkusen	Transfer	Summer	Free
12 June 2024	MF	(Japan) Shen Mengyu	(England) London City Lionesses	Transfer	Summer	Free
29 June 2024	DF	(Guyana) Sydney Cummings	(United States) Spokane Zephyr FC	Transfer	Summer	Free
29 June 2024	MF	(Morocco) Nour Imane Addi	(Portugal) Albergaria	Transfer	Summer	Free
29 June 2024	FW	(Scotland) Tiree Burchill	(Scotland) Partick Thistle	Transfer	Summer	Free
29 June 2024	MF	(Scotland) Lisa Robertson	(Scotland) Heart of Midlothian	Transfer	Summer	Free
25 July 2024	MF	(Scotland) Sienna McGoldrick	(Scotland) Motherwell	Loan	Summer	N/A
31 July 2024	DF	(Scotland) Olivia McStay	(Scotland) Hamilton Academical	Loan	Summer	N/A
31 July 2024	GK	(Scotland) Erin Halliday	(Scotland) Hamilton Academical	Loan	Summer	N/A
31 July 2024	FW	(Scotland) Amy Sharkey	(Scotland) Motherwell	Loan	Summer	N/A
8 August 2024	MF	(Scotland) Maisie Stewart	(Scotland) Montrose	Loan	Summer	N/A
13 September 2024	MF	(Scotland) Lucy Barclay	(Scotland) Motherwell	Loan	Summer	N/A
3 January 2025	DF	(Scotland) Hana Kerner	Free Agent	Released	Winter	Free
23 January 2025	DF	(Republic of Ireland) Caitlin Hayes	(England) Brighton & Hove Albion	Transfer	Winter	Undisclosed
26 January 2025	MF	(Denmark) Signe Carstens	(Sweden) AIK	Transfer	Winter	Free
2 February 2025	FW	(Scotland) Amy Sharkey	(Scotland) Motherwell	Transfer	Summer	Free
4 February 2025	DF	(Wales) Amy Richardson	(Scotland) Partick Thistle	Loan	Winter	N/A
16 February 2025	MF	(Scotland) Maisie Stewart	(Scotland) Dundee United	Loan	Winter	N/A
