= 2026–27 Celtic F.C. Women season =

Celtic F.C.
2026–27 season
- Head Coach: Grant Scott
- Stadium: Kirkintilloch Community Sports Complex, Kirkintilloch
- SWPL 1: 2nd
- Scottish Cup: 4th round
- SWPL Cup: Quarter Final
- Top goalscorer: League: Maria McAneny (7 goals); All: Maria McAneny (8 goals)
Home colours	Away colours	Third colours

The 2026–27 season is Celtic Women's 20th season of competitive football. The club announced that home matches for the 2026/27 season would be played in Kirkintilloch at the Kirkintilloch Community Sports Complex.

== Preseason ==
Celtic announced that the would play Middlesbrough at Green Lane, Redcar on 19 July 2026 as part of their preseason preparations. It was announced that the squad would head south to Bournemouth on the 29 July 2026 for a training camp before facing Southampton on 2 August 2026. The team played Halifax in a closed doors friendly at their Barrowfield training ground winning 4-0.

19 July 2026	Middlesbrough	1-0	Celtic	Redcar
14:00 BST	Ferguson 62'	Report		Stadium: Green Lane

2 August 2026	Southampton	0-0	Celtic	Totton
13:00 BST		Report		Stadium: Testwood Stadium

9 August 2026	Durham	0-1	Celtic	South Shields
14:00 BST		Report	Fisher 11'	Stadium: Mariners Park

== Scottish Women's Premier League ==
The draw for the 2026–27 SWPL season was published at midday on 26 June 2026, with Celtic scheduled to face Glasgow City away at Petershill Park on the opening weekend. Celtic’s first home match at their new ground will be against Montrose. The 1st post-split fixture is due to be played 14 March 2027.

16 August 2026	Glasgow City	1-2	Celtic	Glasgow
16:10 BST	Forrest 10'	Report	Gibson 31' (o.g.); Gibson 39' (o.g.)	Stadium: Petershill Park

23 August 2026	Celtic	3-0	Montrose	Kirkintilloch
13:00 BST	Howe 82'; McAneny 87'; Fisher 90+2'	Report		Stadium: Kirkintilloch Community Sports Complex

30 August 2026	Celtic	2-0	Hibernian	Kirkintilloch
13:00	Craig 42'; Fisher 43'	Report		Stadium: Kirkintilloch Community Sports Complex

6 September 2026	Partick Thistle	2-3	Celtic	Glasgow
13:00 BST	Longcake 24'; Townsley 57'	Report	Fisher 6'; Jordan 55'; Robertson 83'	Stadium: Petershill Park

18 September 2026	Celtic	1-0	Motherwell	Kirkintilloch
19:30 BST	McGregor 90+2'	Report		Stadium: Kirkintilloch Community Sports Complex

27 September 2026	Rangers	5-2	Celtic	Cumbernauld
12:00 BST	McLeary 21', 24'; Blake 59'; Wilkinson 66'; Brookshire 68'	Report	McAneny 12'; Arthur 55'	Stadium: Broadwood Stadium

4 October 2026	Celtic	4-0	Spartans	Kirkintilloch
13:00 BST	Howe 7'; Robertson 45+1'; Gallacher 57'; Craig 65' (pen.)	Report		Stadium: Kirkintilloch Community Sports Complex

18 October 2026	Aberdeen	0-6	Celtic	Cove Bay, Aberdeen
13:00 BST		Report	Craig 8'; McAneny 17', 52'; O'Hanlon 49' (o.g.); Rabjohn 56'; Cross 78'	Stadium: Balmoral Stadium

21 October 2026	Celtic	2-4	Hearts	Kirkintilloch
19:30 BST	McAneny 3', 36'	Report	Dolan 32', 50'; Johns 38' (pen.); Speckmaier 62'	Stadium: Kirkintilloch Community Sports Complex

4 November 2026	Hibernian	0-1	Celtic	Edinburgh
19:30 GMT		Report	Clark 14'	Stadium: Meadowbank Stadium

8 November 2026	Motherwell	3-1	Celtic	East Kilbride
16:00 GMT	Thomson 48'; Boyes 58'; Sinclair 79'	Report	Handley 72'	Stadium: K-Park Training Academy

15 November 2026	Celtic	2-1	Rangers	Kirkintilloch
12:00 GMT	McAneny 66'; Handley 81'	Report	Berry 2'	Stadium: Kirkintilloch Community Sports Complex

13 December 2026	Celtic	v	Aberdeen	Kirkintilloch
14:00 GMT				Stadium: Kirkintilloch Community Sports Complex

== Scottish Women's Cup ==
Celtic entered the draw for the Scottish Cup in the 3rd round where they faced Forfar Farmington at home. After victory over Forfar they are through to the 4th round with the tie due to be played Sunday 10 January 2027.

22 November 2026 3rd Round	Celtic	17-0	Forfar Farmington	Kirkintilloch
13:00 GMT	1' (o.g.); 3' (o.g.); Cross 14', 17', 60'; McAneny 22'; Doran-Barr 24'; Howe 29', 49', 64'; Fisher 56', 65', 77', 85'; Rabjohn 57'; Gallacher 81', 89'			Stadium: Kirkintilloch Community Sports Complex

== Scottish Women's Premier League Cup ==
The draw for the group stages of the 2026/27 SWPL Cup was drawn on 9 June 2026. Celtic enter in the 2nd round where they were drawn against Spartans After a close victory over Spartans, Celtic were drawn away from home in the quarter finals against Glasgow City.

13 September 2026 2nd Round	Celtic	1-0	Spartans	Kirkintilloch
13:00 BST	Howe 36'	Report		Stadium: Kirkintilloch Community Sports Complex

1 November 2026 Quarter Final	Glasgow City	2-0	Celtic	Glasgow
13:00 GMT	Whelan 7'; Gray 87'	Report		Stadium: Petershill Park

== Players ==
As of 16 August 2026

Note: Flags indicate national team as defined under FIFA eligibility rules; some limited exceptions apply. Players may hold more than one non-FIFA nationality.

No.	Pos.	Nation	Player
2	DF	IRL	Claire Walsh
3	DF	WAL	Amy Richardson
4	MF	SCO	Lisa Robertson
5	MF	SCO	Natalie Ross
6	DF	SCO	Chloe Craig
7	FW	SCO	Amy Gallacher
8	FW	SCO	Hannah Jordan
9	FW	ENG	Isabella Fisher
10	DF	ENG	Evie Rabjohn
11	FW	NIR	Casey Howe
14	MF	SCO	Shannon McGregor
15	DF	SCO	Kelly Clark (captain)
16	DF	SCO	Abi Tobin

No.	Pos.	Nation	Player
17	FW	SCO	Morgan Cross
18	DF	ENG	Hannah Luke
19	GK	SCO	Lisa Rodgers
21	DF	SCO	Addie Handley
22	DF	NIR	Fi Morgan
22	DF	SCO	Lauren Doran-Barr
25	MF	JPN	Momo Nakao
33	GK	USA	Adelaide Gay
35	MF	SCO	Freya McIndoe
41	MF	SCO	Clare Goldie
44	DF	ENG	Poppy Lawson
73	MF	SCO	Maria McAneny
77	MF	SCO	Chloe Arthur

=== Players on loan ===
Note: Flags indicate national team as defined under FIFA eligibility rules; some limited exceptions apply. Players may hold more than one non-FIFA nationality.

No.	Pos.	Nation	Player
46	DF	SCO	Darra Dawson
47	MF	SCO	Sienna McGoldrick

== Player Statistics ==
List of player appearances, substitute appearances in brackets. goals and assists for each competition including totals

Key

Aps = Appearances (Subs)

Gls = Goals

Asts = Assists

Celtic FC Women – 2025–26 Player Statistics by Competition
Player	Position	SWPL 1			Scottish Cup			League Cup			Total Apps	Total Goals	Total Assists
		Aps	Gls	Asts	Aps	Gls	Asts	Aps	Gls	Asts			
Goalkeepers
Adelaide Gay	GK	10	0	0	1	0	0	1	0	0	12	0	0
Lisa Rodgers	GK	2	0	0	0	0	0	1	0	0	3	0	0
Defenders
Kelly Clark	DF	8(1)	1	1	1	0	1	1	0	0	10(1)	1	2
Chloe Craig	DF	6(3)	3	0	0(1)	0	0	1(1)	0	0	7(5)	3	0
Lauren Doran-Barr	DF	4(1)	0	1	1	1	1	1	0	0	6(1)	1	2
Addie Handley	DF	5(1)	2	0	1	0	2	1	0	0	7(1)	2	2
Poppy Lawson	DF	7(1)	0	1	0	0	0	2	0	0	9(1)	0	1
Hannah Luke	DF	7(3)	0	1	0	0	0	2	0	0	9(3)	0	1
Fi Morgan	DF	6(1)	0	2	0(1)	0	0	0	0	0	6(2)	0	2
Amy Richardson	DF	0	0	0	0	0	0	0	0	0	0	0	0
Abi Tobin	DF	1(2)	0	0	0	0	0	0(1)	0	0	1(3)	0	0
Claire Walsh	DF	7(4)	0	0	1	0	0	0	0	0	8(4)	0	0
Midfielders
Chloe Arthur	MF	4(3)	1	0	0(1)	0	1	1	0	0	5(4)	1	1
Clare Goldie	MF	0(1)	0	0	1	0	1	0	0	0	1(1)	0	1
Maria McAneny	MF	7(3)	7	3	1	1	0	2	0	0	10(3)	8	3
Shannon McGregor	MF	4(3)	1	0	1	0	0	0(2)	0	0	5(5)	1	0
Freya McIndoe	MF	0	0	0	0	0	0	0(1)	0	0	0(1)	0	0
Momo Nakao	MF	8(1)	0	0	0	0	0	1(1)	0	0	9(2)	0	0
Evie Rabjohn	MF	4(5)	1	1	0(1)	1	1	0	0	0	4(6)	2	2
Lisa Robertson	MF	9(3)	2	2	0	0	0	2	0	1	11(3)	2	3
Natalie Ross	MF	0	0	0	0	0	0	0	0	0	0	0	0
Forwards
Morgan Cross	FW	3(2)	1	1	1	3	5	0(1)	0	0	4(3)	4	6
Isabella Fisher	FW	9(2)	3	1	1	4	0	1	0	0	11(2)	7	1
Amy Gallacher	FW	5(3)	1	0	0(1)	2	1	2	0	0	7(4)	3	1
Casey Howe	FW	7(4)	2	3	1	3	2	1(1)	1	0	9(5)	6	5
Hannah Jordan	FW	9(2)	1	1	0	0	0	2	0	0	11(2)	1	1

=== Goalscorers ===
R	No.	Pos.	Nation	Name	Premiership	Scottish Cup	League Cup	Total
1	73	MF	(Scotland)	Maria McAneny	7	1	0	8
2	9	FW	(England)	Izzy Fisher	3	4	0	7
3	11	FW	(Northern Ireland)	Casey Howe	2	3	1	6
4	17	FW	(Scotland)	Morgan Cross	1	3	0	4
5	6	DF	(Scotland)	Chloe Craig	3	0	0	3
5	7	FW	(Scotland)	Amy Gallacher	1	2	0	3
7	4	MF	(Scotland)	Lisa Robertson	2	0	0	2
7	21	DF	(Scotland)	Addie Handley	2	0	0	2
7	10	FW	(England)	Evie Rabjohn	1	1	0	2
10	8	FW	(Scotland)	Hannah Jordan	1	0	0	1
10	14	MF	(Scotland)	Shannon McGregor	1	0	0	1
10	77	MF	(Scotland)	Chloe Arthur	1	0	0	1
10	15	DF	(Scotland)	Kelly Clark	1	0	0	1
10	15	DF	(Scotland)	Lauren Doran-Barr	0	1	0	1
Own goals					3	2	0	5
Total					29	17	1	47

Last updated: 22 November 2026

=== Clean sheets ===
As of 22 November 2026.

Rank	Name	Premiership	Scottish Cup	League Cup	Total	Games played
1	(United States) Adelaide Gay	5	1	0	6	12
2	(Scotland) Lisa Rodgers	1	0	1	2	3
Total		6	1	1	8	15

=== Disciplinary record ===
As of match played 22 November 2026

Number	Nation	Position	Name	Premiership		Scottish Cup		League Cup		Total	
Number	Nation	Position	Name	Yellow card	Red card	Yellow card	Red card	Yellow card	Red card	Yellow card	Red card
2	(Republic of Ireland)	DF	Claire Walsh	1	0	0	0	0	0	1	0
4	(Scotland)	MF	Lisa Robertson	1	0	0	0	0	0	1	0
6	(Scotland)	DF	Chloe Craig	1	0	0	0	0	0	1	0
7	(Scotland)	FW	Amy Gallacher	2	0	0	0	0	0	2	0
8	(Scotland)	FW	Hannah Jordan	1	0	0	0	0	0	1	0
9	(England)	FW	Isabella Fisher	2	0	0	0	0	0	2	0
11	(Northern Ireland)	FW	Casey Howe	3	0	0	0	1	0	4	0
14	(Scotland)	MF	Shannon McGregor	1	0	0	0	0	0	1	0
18	(England)	DF	Hannah Luke	1	0	0	0	0	0	1	0
20	(Northern Ireland)	DF	Fi Morgan	3	0	0	0	0	0	3	0
22	(Scotland)	DF	Lauren Doran-Barr	0	0	0	0	1	0	1	0
25	(Japan)	MF	Momo Nakao	1	0	0	0	0	0	1	0
44	(England)	DF	Poppy Lawson	2	0	0	0	0	0	2	0
73	(Scotland)	MF	Maria McAneny	2	0	0	0	0	0	2	0
			TOTALS	21	0	0	0	2	0	23	0

== Team Statistics ==
=== League Table ===
==== Regular season ====
Pos	Team	Pld	W	D	L	GF	GA	GD	Pts	Qualification
1	Rangers	12	11	0	1	38	9	+29	33	Advances to the Championship Round
2	Celtic	12	9	0	3	29	16	+13	27	Advances to the Championship Round
3	Glasgow City	12	8	2	2	45	12	+33	26	Advances to the Championship Round
4	Heart of Midlothian	12	8	1	3	37	14	+23	25	Advances to the Championship Round
5	Hibernian	12	7	1	4	33	17	+16	22	Advances to the Championship Round
6	Spartans	12	3	2	7	10	38	−28	11	Advances to the Championship Round
7	Motherwell	12	3	1	8	8	29	−21	10	Participates in the Relegation Round
8	Montrose	12	3	0	9	16	38	−22	9	Participates in the Relegation Round
9	Partick Thistle	12	2	2	8	16	30	−14	8	Participates in the Relegation Round
10	Aberdeen	12	1	1	10	6	35	−29	4	Participates in the Relegation Round

Updated to match(es) played on 18 November 2026. Source:
Rules for classification: 1) Points; 2) Head-to-head record; 3) Head-to-head goal difference; 4) Head-to-head goals scored; 5) Goal difference in the post-split phase; 6) Goals scored in the post-split phase; 7) Number of wins in the post-split phase; 8) Number of wins across the full season; 9) Goal difference across the season; 10) Goals scored across the season;

=== Results by Round ===
==== Regular season ====
Round	1	2	3	4	5	6	7	8	9	10	11	12	13	14	15	16	17	18
Ground	A	H	H	A	H	A	H	A	H	A	A	H	-	-	-	-	-	-
Result	W	W	W	W	W	L	W	W	L	W	L	W	-	-	-	-	-	-
Position	4	4	2	2	1	2	2	2	3	2	3	2	-	-	-	-	-	-

Updated to match(es) played on 18 November 2026. Source: Matches
A = Away; H = Home; W = Win; D = Draw; L = Loss; P = Postponed

== Transfers ==
=== In ===
Date	Pos	Player	From	Type	Window	Fee
8 July 2026	FW	(Northern Ireland) Casey Howe	(England) Nottingham Forest	Transfer	Summer	Free
9 July 2026	FW	(Scotland) Hannah Jordan	(Scotland) Hibernian	Transfer	Summer	Free
10 July 2026	DF	(Scotland) Addie Handley	(Scotland) Partick Thistle	Transfer	Summer	Free
11 July 2026	DF	(Scotland) Lauren Doran-Barr	(Scotland) Hibernian	Transfer	Summer	Free
17 July 2026	DF	(Scotland) Abi Tobin	(Scotland) Aberdeen	Transfer	Summer	Free
19 July 2026	DF	(Northern Ireland) Fi Morgan	(Northern Ireland) Cliftonville	Transfer	Summer	Free
22 July 2026	DF	(England) Poppy Lawson	(Scotland) Hibernian	Transfer	Summer	Free
8 August 2026	MF	(Scotland) Chloe Arthur	(England) Crystal Palace	Transfer	Summer	Free
9 August 2026	FW	(England) Isabella Fisher	(England) Burnley	Transfer	Summer	Free

=== Out ===
Date	Pos	Player	To	Type	Window	Fee
8 June 2026	MF	(Scotland) Jenny Smith	(Scotland) Hearts	Transfer	Summer	Free
26 June 2026	DF	(England) Maddi Wilde	(England) London City Lionesses	End of Loan	Summer	N/A
26 June 2026	FW	(England) Poppy Pritchard	(England) Manchester City	End of Loan	Summer	N/A
26 June 2026	DF	(Republic of Ireland) Tara O'Hanlon	(England) Manchester City	End of Loan	Summer	N/A
26 June 2026	DF	(Scotland) Emma Lawton	N/A	Released	Summer	Free
26 June 2026	FW	(Republic of Ireland) Saoirse Noonan	N/A	Released	Summer	Free
26 June 2026	MF	(Sweden) Emma Westin	N/A	Released	Summer	Free
14 August 2026	MF	(Scotland) Sienna McGoldrick	(Scotland) Partick Thistle	Loan	Summer	N/A
14 August 2026	DF	(Scotland) Darra Dawson	(Scotland) Partick Thistle	Loan	Summer	N/A
