= 2025–26 Women's Scottish Cup =

2025–26 Scottish Women's Cup
Tournament details
- Country: Scotland

Final positions
- Champions: Celtic
- Runners-up: Rangers

The 2025–26 Women's Scottish Cup was the 53nd official edition (55th overall) of the national cup competition in Scottish women's football. For sponsorship reasons, this edition was officially known as the Scottish Gas Women's Scottish Cup.

Rangers were the two-time defending champions, and they reached the final again but this time lost to Celtic at Hampden Park.

== Results ==
=== First preliminary round ===
The draw was made on 23 July 2025.

=== Second preliminary round ===
The draw was made on 23 July 2025. Matches were played on the weekend of 6/7 September 2025.

- Aberdeen City 2–3 Edinburgh University
- Arbroath v Ross County (Note: Arbroath progressed due to Ross County forfeiting the match.)
- Bishopton 11–0 Alloa Athletic
- Cumbernauld United 6–0 Murieston United
- Danderhall Miners 3–5 Central Ladies
- Gretna 2–4 Grampian Ladies
- Huntly v Annan Athletic (Note: Huntly progressed due to Annan withdrawing from the competition.)
- Jeanfield Swifts 3–8 Cumbernauld Colts
- St Anthony's 10–0 Blairgowrie
- Stonehaven 1–5 Buckie Ladies
- Thornton Hibs 2–0 Cumnock Juniors
- West Park United 0–4 Harmony Row

=== First Round ===
The draw was made on 9 September 2025. 12 clubs from SWF League One entered at this stage. Matches were played on the weekend of 4/5 October 2025.

- Arbroath FC Women 0–2 Elgin City
- Bishopton Ladies 3–0 Airdrie CC Ladies FC
- Cambusdoon Ladies FC 2–3 Cumbernauld United Ladies
- Cumbernauld Colts 3–2 Huntly FC Women
- Dunipace FC Ladies 1–2 Thornton Hibs Ladies FC
- Edinburgh Caledonia FC 1–3 Central Ladies
- Edinburgh Uni Thistle 3–2 Inverurie Locos Works FC Ladies
- Glenrothes Strollers Ladies 2–3 Dunfermline Athletic Women
- Grampian Ladies FC 0–1 St Mirren Women FC
- Harmony Row WFC 0–5 Westdyke Ladies
- Hutchison Vale P–P Buckie Ladies
- Queen of the South Ladies 5–2 Saint Anthony's Ladies FC

=== Second Round ===
The draw was made on 6 October 2025. 12 clubs from the SWF Championship entered at this stage. Matches were played on the weekend of 1/2 November 2025.

- Bishopton Ladies 2–4 Cumbernauld United
- Bonnyrigg Rose 2–1 Forfar Farmington
- Central Ladies 2–7 Stenhousemuir
- Elgin City 2–3 (aet) Edinburgh Uni Thistle
- Falkirk 8–0 Buckie Ladies
- Glasgow Women 1–7 Ayr United
- Greenock Morton 1–6 Armadale Thistle
- Inverness CT 3–5 Dryburgh Athletic
- Queen of the South 3–1 St Mirren
- Renfrew Ladies 8–4 Westdyke Ladies
- Rossvale 6–0 Cumbernauld Colts
- Thornton Hibs 0–3 Dunfermline Athletic

=== Third Round ===
The draw was made on 3 November 2025. 10 clubs from the Scottish Women's Premier League and 10 clubs from SWPL 2 entered at this stage.

7 December 2025	Armadale Thistle	5–2	Cumbernauld United

7 December 2025	Bonnyrigg Rose	8–3 (a.e.t.)	East Fife

7 December 2025	Boroughmuir Thistle	6–0	Edinburgh Uni Thistle

7 December 2025	Celtic	14–0	Dunfermline Athletic

7 December 2025	Dundee United	4–0	Rossvale

7 December 2025	Falkirk	0–4	Aberdeen

7 December 2025	Glasgow City	3–0	Motherwell

7 December 2025	Hibernian	7–0	Dryburgh Athletic

7 December 2025	Kilmarnock	1–0	Gartcairn

7 December 2025	Livingston	0–2	Partick Thistle

7 December 2025	Montrose	2–1 (a.e.t.)	Hamilton Academical

7 December 2025	Queen of the South	1–3	Stenhousemuir

7 December 2025	Rangers	8–0	Renfrew

7 December 2025	St Johnstone	0–9	Queen's Park

7 December 2025	Stirling University	5–2 (a.e.t.)	Ayr United

11 December 2025	Spartans	0–4	Heart of Midlothian	Edinburgh
		Report	G. Timms 5'; B. Hutchison 39'; S. Adamolekun 48'; M. Forsyth 87'	Stadium: Ainslie Park

=== Fourth Round ===
The draw was made on 8 December 2025.

11 January 2026	Glasgow City	6–0	Queen's Park	Glasgow
12:00	L. Forrest 21', 60'; E. Brownlie 28', 56'; N. Wróbel 34', 39'	Report		Stadium: Petershill Park

11 January 2026	Hibernian	2–3	Celtic	Edinburgh
13:00	T. Burchill 46'; E. Adams 50'	Report	E. Lawton 16'; M. Cross 45'; M. McAneny 52'	Stadium: Meadowbank Stadium

11 January 2026	Dundee United	5–1	Bonnyrigg Rose
15:30	K. Frew 31'; D. Findlay 37'; R. Todd 66', 83'; R. Smith 85'	Report	K. Stevens 72'

11 January 2026	Rangers	6–0	Kilmarnock
16:00	K. Wilkinson 12'; M. McAulay 25'; Q. Sabajo 43'; E. Austin 67'; L. Berry 75'; S.J. Kim 84'	Report

11 January 2026	Partick Thistle	4–0	Boroughmuir Thistle
16:00	E. Rennie 13', 34', 75'; R. McAllister 59'	Report

14 January 2026	Stirling University	0–19	Heart of Midlothian
19:45		Report	D. Ypema 5'; C. Johns 8', 18', 26', 36', 62'; L. Wade 12', 28', 60'; M. Forsyth 34', 40'; B. Hutchison 38'; S. Adamolekun 45'; G. Timms 53', 54'; T. Campbell 59', 88'; J. Slattery 66'; E. Dolan 70'

18 January 2026	Aberdeen	1–2	Montrose
13:00	A. Tobin 31'	Report	K. McDonald-Nguah 76'; D. Taylor 90'

18 January 2026	Armadale	0–3	Stenhousemuir
14:30		Report	L. McDonald 5'; K. Halpin 71'; N. McClounan 80'

=== Quarter-finals ===
The draw was made on 12 January 2026.

15 February 2026	Glasgow City	2–0	Stenhousemuir
12:00	Määttä 22'; A. Harrison 32'	Report

15 February 2026	Heart of Midlothian	3–4 (a.e.t.)	Celtic
15:00	K. Jardine 37'; G. Timms 77'; B. Hutchison 120'	Report	M. Cross 24'; E. Westin 45+3'; H. Luke 97'; E. Lawton 105'

15 February 2026	Partick Thistle	0–8	Rangers
16:00		Report	K. Wilkinson 4', 58'; N. Docherty 11'; L. Berry 13', 32', 48'; K. Hill 27'; L. Eddie 61'

17 February 2026	Montrose	5–1	Dundee United
19:45	L. Brown 11'; N. Guthrie 27'; S. Martin 38', 60'; G. Carter 43'	Report	R. Smith 55'

=== Semi-finals ===
The draw was made on 16 February 2026.

2 May 2026	Celtic	3–2 (a.e.t.)	Glasgow City	Glasgow
12:30	S. Noonan 27'; A. Gallacher 92'; S. McGregor 105+5'	Report	L. Motlhalo 85'; E. Gray 120'	Stadium: Hampden Park

3 May 2026	Rangers	2–0	Montrose	Glasgow
13:30	K. Wilkinson 52', 90+3' (pen.)	Report		Stadium: Hampden Park

== Final ==
The final at Hampden Park was between Celtic and Rangers (the clubs referred to collectively as the 'Old Firm' owing to their dominance and commercial draw in men's football) in a repeat of the 2023 event. Celtic had won that final and were league champions in 2024, while Rangers had won the cup in 2024 and 2025, and been league runners-up in both those seasons as well as the 2025–26 competition. In March 2026 they reached the final of the secondary knockout tournament, the SWPL Cup, but lost to Glasgow City, ending a run of three victories in that competition. As well as being the cup holders, Rangers held a clear statistical advantage between the clubs, having finished 12 points above Celtic in the SWPL and being undefeated in their past 12 meetings in all competitions, spanning more than two years and including a dominant 4–0 victory as recently as 17 May 2026.

Celtic had the tougher run to the final: they defeated Hibernian, Heart of Midlothian and Glasgow City, the other three teams who would finish above them in the league, all by single-goal margins. By contrast, Rangers had an easier draw: they overcame second-tier Kilmarnock followed by Partick Thistle and Montrose, scoring 16 goals without reply.

Celtic won the trophy with a 1–0 victory, with the winning goal scored by midfielder Morgan Cross in the first half. Rangers dominated possession, particularly after Celtic defender Emma Lawton was sent off for two yellow cards, and had several chances to score, with Mia McAulay hitting the post and claiming unsuccessfully for a late penalty, but they were unable to find an equaliser.

=== Details ===
25 May 2025
14:00

Rangers	0–1	Celtic
	Report	M. Cross 24'; E. Lawton (red card) 58'

Hampden Park, Glasgow
Referee: Abbie Hendry

Rangers	Celtic

GK	1	(Scotland) Jenna Fife
DF	2	(Scotland) Nicola Docherty (c)
DF	3	(Scotland) Leah Eddie
DF	4	(Scotland) Kathryn Hill
DF	16	(Scotland) Eilidh Austin	(substituted off) 65'
MF	24	(Greece) Calliste Brookshire
MF	48	(South Korea) Kim Shin-ji
MF	21	(England) May Cruft	(substituted off) 75'
FW	14	(Scotland) Mia McAulay
FW	18	(Scotland) Laura Berry
FW	44	(England) Katie Wilkinson
Substitutes:
GK	30	(Wales) Soffia Kelly
DF	5	(England) Jessica Pegram
MF	10	(Suriname) Quinty Sabajo
DF	13	(China) Li Mengwen
MF	26	(Scotland) Jodi McLeary
MF	7	(Scotland) Brogan Hay	(substituted on) 65'
MF	20	(United States) Camille Lafaix	(substituted on) 75'
DF	46	(Scotland) Lily Boyce
Manager:
(Scotland) Leanne Crichton

GK	33	(United States) Adelaide Gay
DF	2	(Republic of Ireland) Claire Walsh
DF	44	(Scotland) Emma Lawton	(red card) 58'
DF	15	(Scotland) Kelly Clark (c)
DF	6	(Scotland) Chloe Craig
DF	10	(England) Evie Rabjohn	(substituted off) 74'
MF	4	(Scotland) Lisa Robertson
FW	7	(Scotland) Amy Gallacher	(substituted off) 86'
DF	18	(Scotland) Hannah Luke	(substituted off) 74'
MF	17	(Scotland) Morgan Cross	(substituted off) 57'
FW	20	(Scotland) Saoirse Noonan	(substituted off) 74'
Substitutes:
GK	19	(Scotland) Lisa Rodgers
DF	34	(Scotland) Mirren Duncan
DF	46	(Scotland) Darra Dawson
MF	25	(Japan) Momo Nakao	(substituted on) 74'
MF	8	(Scotland) Jenny Smith	(substituted on) 57'
DF	22	(Scotland) Tara O'Hanlon	(substituted on) 74'
FW	9	(United States) Poppy Pritchard	(substituted on) 86'
MF	14	(Scotland) Shannon McGregor	(substituted on) 74'
Manager:
(Scotland) Grant Scott

Player of the Match:
