= McAneny =

McAneny is a surname. Notable people with the surname include:

- Douglas J. McAneny (born 1955), United States Navy admiral
- George McAneny (1869–1953), American newspaperman and politician
- Joseph McAneny (1924–2007), American politician
- Maria McAneny (born 2004), Scottish footballer

== See also ==
- McAnany
- McEnany (surname)
