= Jenny Smith (footballer) =

Scottish footballer (born 2002)

Personal information
- Full name: Jennifer Jacqueline Smith
- Date of birth: 20 June 2002 (age 24)
- Place of birth: Penicuik, Scotland
- Positions: Midfielder; wing-back

Team information
- Current team: Hearts
- Number: 15

Youth career
- 2016–2018: Heart of Midlothian

Senior career*
Years	Team	Apps	(Gls)
2018–2023	Heart of Midlothian	26+	(4+)
2023–2026	Celtic	60	(10)
2026-	Heart of Midlothian	0	(0)

International career^{‡}
2017	Scotland U15	1	(0)
2018	Scotland U16	3	(0)
2018–2019	Scotland U17	15	(0)
2019–2020	Scotland U19	5	(1)
2023–	Scotland U23	1	(0)
2023–	Scotland	1	(0)
- * Club domestic league appearances and goals as of 23 November 2024 ‡ National team caps and goals as of 23 November 2024

Jennifer Jacqueline Smith (born 20 June 2002) is a Scottish footballer who plays as a midfielder for Scottish Women's Premier League club Heart of Midlothian where she began her youth career and the Scotland national team. She previously played for Celtic.

== Club career ==
Smith attended Penicuik High School; she began her football career as youth player at Heart of Midlothian, playing an increasingly important role for the Edinburgh club as they gained promotion by winning the SWPL2 title in 2019 and established themselves in the top tier. She departed in June 2023 having made over 100 appearances, crossing the central belt to join Celtic – the move was made official on her 21st birthday.

In Smith's first season in Glasgow, Celtic won their first-ever SWPL championship, although she fell out of favour in her usual position in central midfield and ended the campaign mostly on the bench, and competition for places in the role increased that summer with the signings of Shannon McGregor and the Danish twins Mathilde and Signe Carstens. However, in the early months of the following season Smith was used often as a right wing-back in domestic matches and as a right-sided midfielder within a more defensive shape for fixtures in the UEFA Women's Champions League group stage (for which the team qualified for the first time), albeit her situation was complicated by the arrival of right-back Emma Lawton.

In her 3rd season with Celtic, Smith only made 7 starts across all competitions but played her part in the 25/26 Women's Scottish cup win, where she replaced winning goalscorer Morgan Cross in the 2nd half.

On 8 June 2026 Celtic announced that Smith was leaving the club after 3 seasons. She made a total of 87 appearances scoring a total of 12 goals. Later that day Heart of Midlothian announced that she had returned to the club on an initial one-year deal.

== International career ==
After being involved at youth levels (mainly with the under-17s), Smith made her full international debut for Scotland as a substitute in a UEFA Women's Nations League fixture against the Netherlands in October 2023. She joined the squad for the 2024 Pinatar Cup when Christy Grimshaw withdrew due to injury, but did not appear in the tournament.

== Honours ==
Heart of Midlothian

- SWPL2: 2019

Celtic

- Scottish Women's Premier League: 2023–24
- Women's Scottish Cup: 2025–26
