= McAnany =

McAnany is a surname. Notable people with the surname include:

- Jim McAnany (1936–2015), American baseball player
- Patrick McAnany (born 1943), Kansas Court of Appeals judge

== See also ==
- McAnaney
- McEnany (surname)
