= McAnaney =

McAnaney is a surname. Notable people with the surname include:

- Gerry McAnaney (born 1958), Irish football administrator
- William McAnaney (1910–1987), Australian politician

== See also ==
- McAnany
- McEnaney
