= McEneny =

McEneny is a surname. Notable people with the surname include:

- Evan McEneny (born 1994), Canadian ice hockey player
- George McAneny (1869-1953), American Manhattan Borough President and New York City Comptroller
- John McEneny (born 1943), American politician

== See also ==
- McEnany, surname
