= Thomas Enevoldsen =

Danish professional footballer (born 1987)

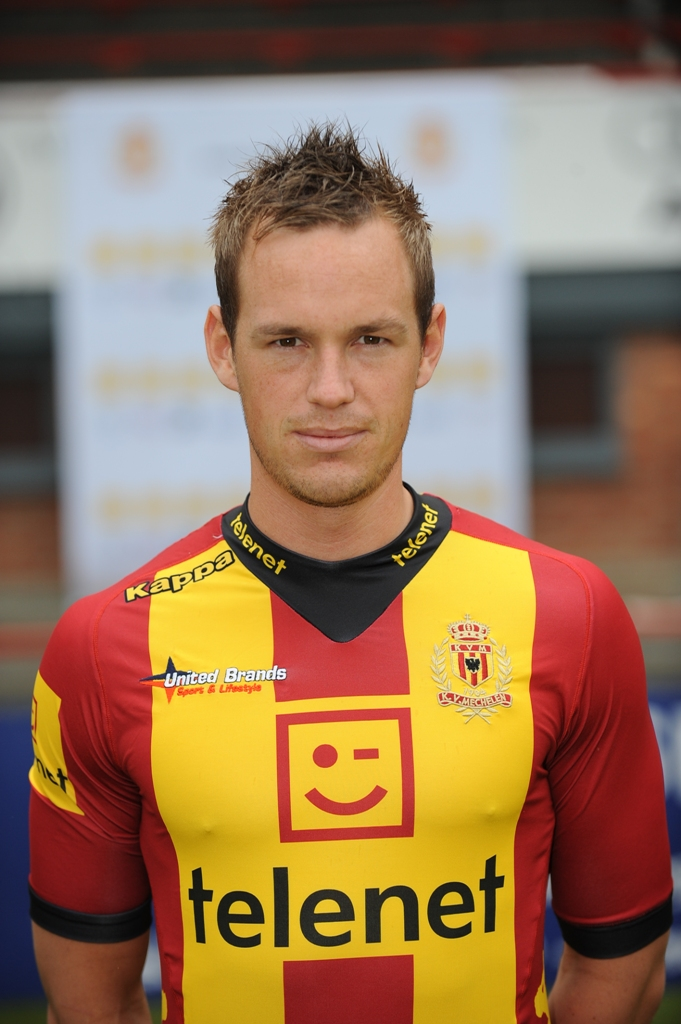
- Enevoldsen with Mechelen in 2012

Personal information
- Date of birth: 27 July 1987 (age 39)
- Place of birth: Frejlev, Denmark
- Height: 1.81 m (5 ft 11 in)
- Positions: Winger; forward

Youth career
- St. Restrup IF

Senior career*
Years	Team	Apps	(Gls)
2005–2009	AaB	78	(6)
2009–2012	Groningen	75	(11)
2012–2015	Mechelen	35	(5)
2014–2015	→ AaB (loan)	29	(4)
2015–2017	AaB	47	(13)
2017–2018	NAC Breda	12	(1)
2018	Orange County SC	34	(20)
2019	Indy Eleven	20	(5)
2019	Sacramento Republic	12	(8)
2020–2021	Orange County SC	13	(2)
2020	→ Hobro IK (loan)	14	(1)
Total		369	(76)

International career
2004–2005	Denmark U18	3	(0)
2005–2006	Denmark U19	7	(0)
2006	Denmark U20	3	(0)
2007–2008	Denmark U21	13	(0)
2009–2011	Denmark	11	(1)
- * Club domestic league appearances and goals

Thomas Enevoldsen (born 27 July 1987) is a Danish former professional footballer who played as a forward. He made eleven appearances for the Denmark national team scoring one goal.

== Club career ==
=== AaB ===
Enevoldsen was born in Frejlev, a suburb to Aalborg. He got his domestic breakthrough during AaB's championship-winning 2007–08 Danish Superliga season. Enevoldsen played 31 of 33 Superliga games and scored three goals. He also played well at the European stage, and scored a goal at White Hart Lane against Tottenham Hotspur in the 2007–08 UEFA Cup, to put AaB one ahead in a game they eventually lost 3–2. On 3 April 2008, he was selected as Player of the Month in March by the managers and team captains of the Superliga clubs.

Enevoldsen played 28 games in the 2008–09 Danish Superliga season, as well as games in the European 2008–09 UEFA Champions League and 2008–09 UEFA Cup tournaments. In the Summer of 2009, Enevoldsen was linked with a transfer to Benfica.

=== Groningen ===
At the start of the 2009–10 Danish Superliga season, Enevoldsen signed a five-year deal with Eredivisie club FC Groningen. Groningen paid a reported DKK 9.3 million (€1.25 million) for him. He scored his first three goals for FC Groningen in the same match on 13 December 2009 against Sparta Rotterdam. All goals were scored from outside of the penalty area.

=== Mechelen ===
Following the 2011–12 season, Enevoldsen moved to Mechelen, who had already signed his compatriot Mads Junker earlier in the transfer window. He made his debut on 28 July 2012 in a 4–2 league win over Club Brugge. He began his tenure with the club as a starter, but in his second season he played less. He made 38 total appearances for the club, in which he scored five goals.

==== AaB (loan) ====
As a result of his situation, Enevoldsen returned to AaB on a one-year loan deal on 16 June 2014. He made his first appearance after returning to Denmark on 19 July 2014, starting in a 0–0 away draw against SønderjyskE. He scored his first goal after returning on 23 October, in 3–0 shutdown of Dynamo Kyiv in the UEFA Europa League group stage.

=== Return to AaB ===
After his loan deal with AaB ended, Enevoldsen agreed to a two-year permanent deal with the club on 19 June 2015. Two successful years followed, in which he made 53 total appearances and scored 19 goals. He left the club upon his contract expiring on 30 June 2017.

=== NAC Breda ===
On 30 August 2017, Enevoldsen signed a one-year contract with NAC Breda with the option of an additional year. He made his debut on 20 September in a 4–3 loss to Achilles '29 in the KNVB Cup. Despite the loss, he came on as a substitute and scored the third goal for his club deep into injury time after an assist by Thierry Ambrose. His domestic league debut followed three days later in a 2–0 away win over Feyenoord, coming on as a late substitute and scoring his second goal in two games. After a strong start, Enevoldsen would mostly appear as a substitute during the remainder of the fall. He finished with 12 appearances in which he scored two goals.

=== Orange County SC ===
On 10 February 2018, Enevoldsen joined Orange County SC of the United Soccer League. He made his debut for the club 18 March in a 1–1 home draw against Phoenix Rising FC at Championship Soccer Stadium. His first goal for the club came on 29 March as he helped down OKC Energy FC 1–0 for Orange County's first win of 2018. In the following game on 31 March, Enevoldsen notched his first hat-trick for the club in a 5–0 away win over the Tulsa Roughnecks, assisting another. His strong form continued down the stretch for Orange County, adding braces to his record against Portland Timbers 2 and Las Vegas Lights FC. He finished the season as the club's top goalscorer with 20 goals in 34 appearances in which he added nine assists, earning him second place in the 2018 USL Golden Boot race, only behind Cameron Lancaster, and a spot on the USL All-League First Team. In his 2018 season, Enevoldsen set the Orange County SC single-season goal scoring record.

=== Indy Eleven ===
On 29 January 2019, Enevoldsen moved to USL side Indy Eleven.

=== Sacramento Republic ===
On 12 August 2019, Enevoldsen transferred to Sacramento Republic for the remainder of the 2019 USL Championship season.

=== Return to Orange County ===
On 25 December 2019, Enevoldsen signed a contract to return to Orange County SC. Enevoldsen was loaned out to newly relegated Danish 1st Division club Hobro IK on 2 September 2020 for the rest of the year.

==== Retirement ====
Enevoldsen retired from professional football after his final game for Orange County SC on 28 November 2021, playing the closing 30 minutes of the 2021 USL Championship final, which ended with his team lifting a trophy at Al Lang Stadium after defeating the Tampa Bay Rowdies with the final score of 3–1. He would instead focus on a media company he co-founded in 2016.

== International career ==
Enevoldsen made his international debut with the Under-18 national selection in September 2004. He played a total of 26 youth international matches.

In October 2009, Enevoldsen was called up for the Denmark national team for the 2010 FIFA World Cup qualifying games against Sweden and Hungary. He made his debut when he replaced Søren Larsen for the second half of the match against Hungary. He scored his first international goal in a May 2010 friendly match against Senegal. He played one game in the 2010 FIFA World Cup.

== Career statistics ==
=== International ===
Scores and results list Denmark's goal tally first, score column indicates score after each Enevoldsen goal.

List of international goals scored by Thomas Enevoldsen
No.	Date	Venue	Opponent	Score	Result	Competition
1	27 May 2010	Aalborg Stadion, Aalborg, Denmark	Senegal	2–0	2–0	Friendly

== Honours ==
AaB

- Danish Superliga: 2007–08

Orange County SC

- USL Championship: 2021

== Private Life ==
He is in a relationship with the Danish former handball player Lærke Møller, with whom he has a child.
