= Signe Carstens =

Danish football player (born 2002)

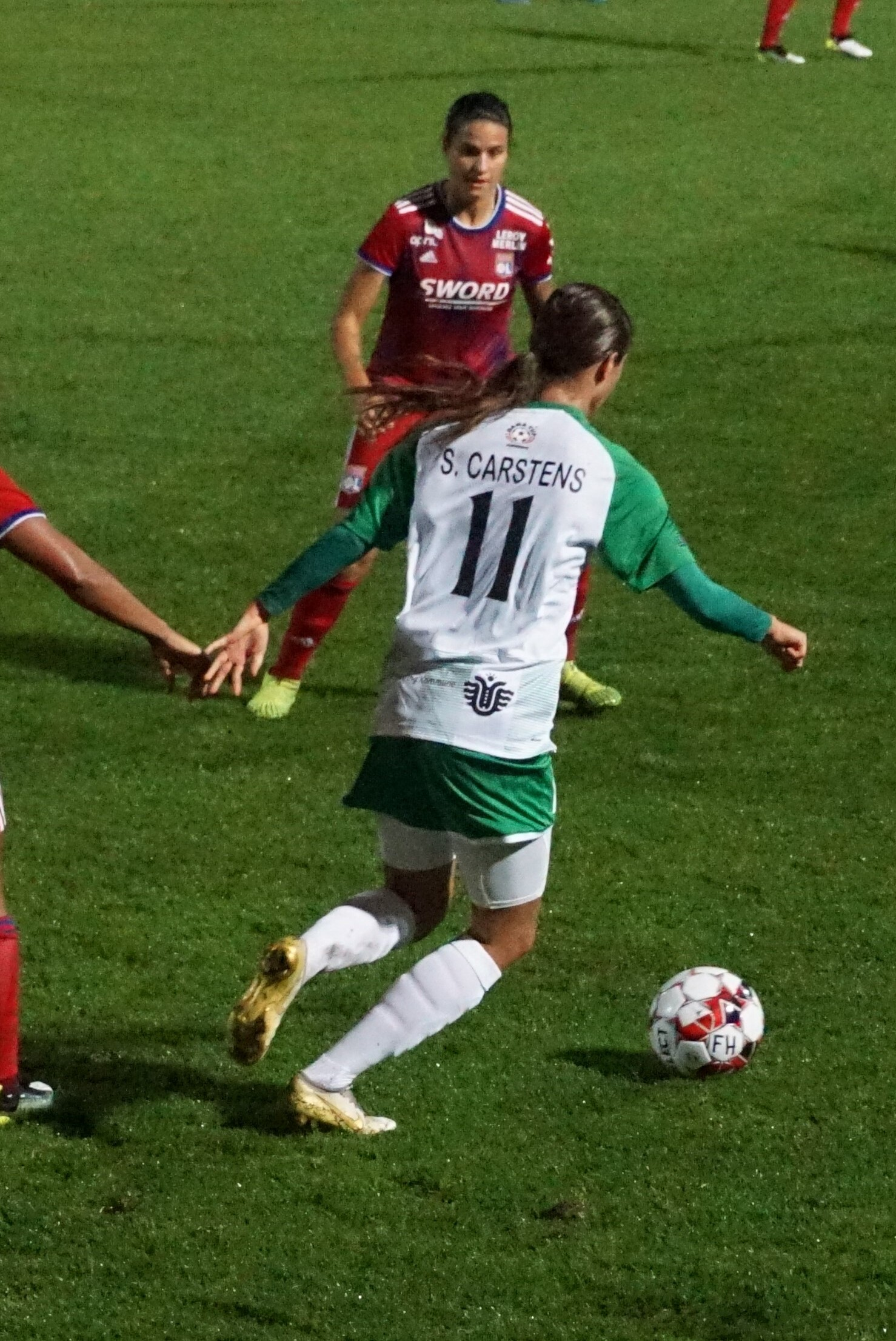
- Carstens with Fortuna Hjørring in 2019

Personal information
- Full name: Signe Bundgaard Carstens
- Date of birth: 7 March 2002 (age 24)
- Place of birth: Frejlev, Denmark
- Position: Midfielder

Team information
- Current team: Fortuna Hjørring
- Number: 21

Youth career
- 2018–2019: Fortuna Hjørring

Senior career*
Years	Team	Apps	(Gls)
2019–2024	Fortuna Hjørring	57	(1)
2024–2025	Celtic	9	(1)
2025	AIK	0	(0)
2025–2026	Brøndby	8	(0)
2026–	Fortuna Hjørring		

International career^{‡}
2017–2018	Denmark U16	9	(0)
2018–2019	Denmark U17	13	(2)
2019–2020	Denmark U19	8	(0)
2019–	Denmark U23	8	(0)
- * Club domestic league appearances and goals ‡ National team caps and goals as of 2 February 2026

Signe Carstens (born 7 March 2002) is a Danish footballer who plays as a midfielder for A-Liga side Fortuna Hjørring. Carstens previously played for Brøndby, AIK, and Celtic

== Personal life ==
Signe Carstens has a twin sister Mathilde Carstens who is also a professional footballer.
