= McEnany =

McEnany is a surname of Irish origin (Irish Mac Conaonaigh, "son of hound of fair", also corrupted to Mac an Éanaigh, "son of the birds")

Notable people with the surname include:

- Abby McEnany (born 1968), American comedian
- Kayleigh McEnany (born 1988), American political commentator and author

== See also ==
- McEnaney
- McEneny
