= Murphy Agnew =

American soccer player (born 1998)

Personal information
- Full name: Murphy Alexandra Agnew
- Date of birth: November 10, 1998 (age 27)
- Place of birth: New Hope, Pennsylvania, United States
- Positions: Forward; midfielder

Team information
- Current team: Brisbane Roar
- Number: 7

Youth career
- YMS Xplosion 98
- –2016: VJM Jems

College career
Years	Team	Apps	(Gls)
2017–2021	Harvard Crimson	52	(17)

Senior career*
Years	Team	Apps	(Gls)
2022	Þróttur	6	(6)
2022–2023	Newcastle Jets	16	(1)
2023–2025	Celtic	33	(17)
2025–2026	Strasbourg	16	(0)
2026–	Brisbane Roar	0	(0)
- * Club domestic league appearances and goals as of September 7, 2026

Murphy Alexandra Agnew (born November 10, 1998) is an American professional soccer player who plays as a forward or midfielder for A-League Women club Brisbane Roar. She previously played for French club Strasbourg, Scottish club Celtic, Australian club Newcastle Jets, and Icelandic club Þróttur. She played college soccer for the Harvard Crimson.

== Early life ==
Agnew played for YMS Xplosion 98. She was a three-time USYSA National Championship Golden Ball Winner in 2014, 2015, and 2016. In 2016–2017, she was the Gatorade Pennsylvania Soccer Player of the Year. She attended Villa Joseph Marie High School where she was team captain. She ended her high school career with 97 goals.

== College career ==
Agnew attended Harvard University where she played soccer. In 2017, she earned Ivy League Rookie of the Year and gained Second Team All-Ivy. She was Ivy League Rookie of the Week twice. She played in all 17 games with 12 starts and totaled four goals and five assists, which led the team on the season.

During her sophomore year, she earned First Team All-Ivy. She scored two goals with a team high four assists. She appeared in 14 games with 10 starts.

During her junior year, she gained Ivy League Offensive Player of the Year honors and earned First Team All-Ivy unanimously. She was two time Ivy League Player of the Week. She had a team-high seven goals and eight assists. She led the league in points per game and ranked 15th nationally with 0.57 assists per game.

In 2020, she was identified as an NWSL Discovery Player. The season was canceled due to COVID-19.

During her senior year, she earned a spot on the MAC Hermann Trophy Watch List and gained a spot in the NEWISA Senior Bowl. She garnered selection as a Senior Class Award Candidate and named to Top Drawer Soccer's Postseason National Top 100 and Midseason National Top 100 lists. Agnew missed much of the season due to an injury.

== Club career ==
In September 2025, Agnew signed a one-year contract with Première Ligue club Strasbourg.

In September 2026, Agnew returned to Australia, joining A-League Women club Brisbane Roar.

== Honors ==
Celtic

- Scottish Women's Premier League: 2023–24
