= Luana Muñoz =

Argentine footballer (born 1999)

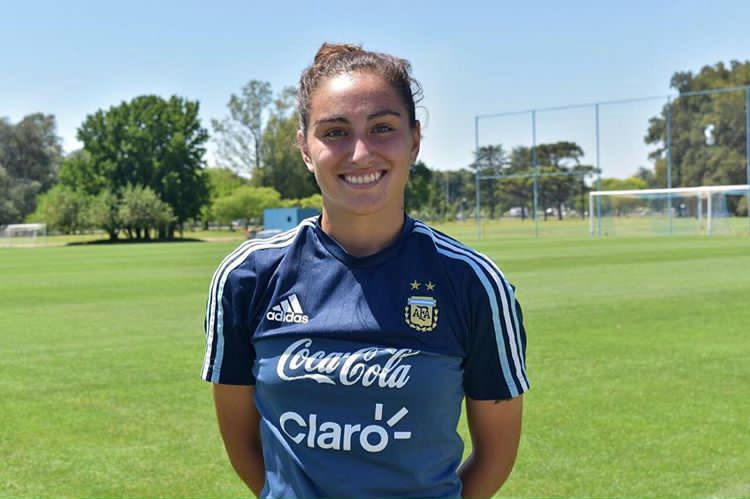

Personal information
- Full name: Luana Florencia Muñoz
- Date of birth: 22 January 1999 (age 27)
- Place of birth: Avellaneda, Argentina
- Height: 1.68 m (5 ft 6 in)
- Position: Centre-back

Team information
- Current team: Celtic

College career
Years	Team	Apps	(Gls)
2017–2018	Tyler Apaches	24	(3)
2019–2020	Texas Tech Red Raiders	10	(0)

Senior career*
Years	Team	Apps	(Gls)
2013–2015	River Plate		
2016–2017	UAI Urquiza		
2021–2023	Racing		
2023–	Celtic	0	(0)

International career^{‡}
2014	Argentina U20	?	(1)
2019–	Argentina	1	(0)
- * Club domestic league appearances and goals ‡ National team caps and goals as of 3 March 2019

Luana Florencia Muñoz (born 22 January 1999) is an Argentine footballer who plays as a centre-back for Celtic and the Argentina women's national team. She transferred to Texas Tech after two seasons at Tyler Junior College.

== International career ==
Muñoz represented Argentina at the 2014 South American U-20 Women's Championship. She made her senior debut for Argentina on 28 February 2019 in a 0–5 friendly loss against South Korea.

== Personal life ==
Muñoz is a supporter of Racing. She also supports the movement to make abortion legal, safe, and free in Argentina.
