= Frejlev =

- Town
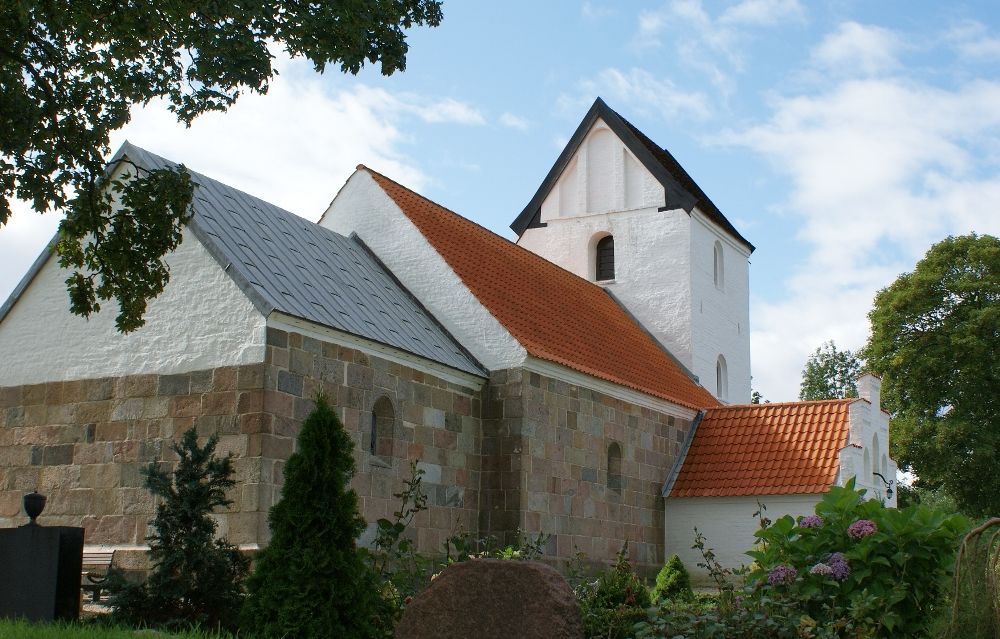
- Frejlev Church

- Location in Denmark Frejlev (North Jutland Region)
- Coordinates: 57°0′27″N 9°49′8″E
- Country: Denmark
- Region: North Jutland Region
- Municipality: Aalborg Municipality

Area
  - Urban: 1.9 km^{2} (0.73 sq mi)

Population (2026)
  - Urban: 3,236
  - Urban density: 1,700/km^{2} (4,400/sq mi)
  - Gender: 1,641 males and 1,595 females
- Time zone: UTC+1 (CET)
  - Summer (DST): UTC+2 (CEST)
- Postal code: DK-9200 Aalborg SV

Frejlev is a satellite community just outside Aalborg, Denmark. Located some 3 km (2 mi) west of Skalborg and 10 km (6.2 mi) southwest of Aalborg's city centre, it belongs to the Municipality of Aalborg in the North Jutland Region, and had a population of 3,236 (1 January 2026).

== Notable people ==
- Ellen Christensen (1913 in Frejlev – 1998) a Danish nurse who became a resistance fighter during the German occupation of Denmark in WWII
- Thomas Enevoldsen (1987 in Frejlev – ) a Danish former professional footballer
