= Lucy Ashworth-Clifford =

English footballer

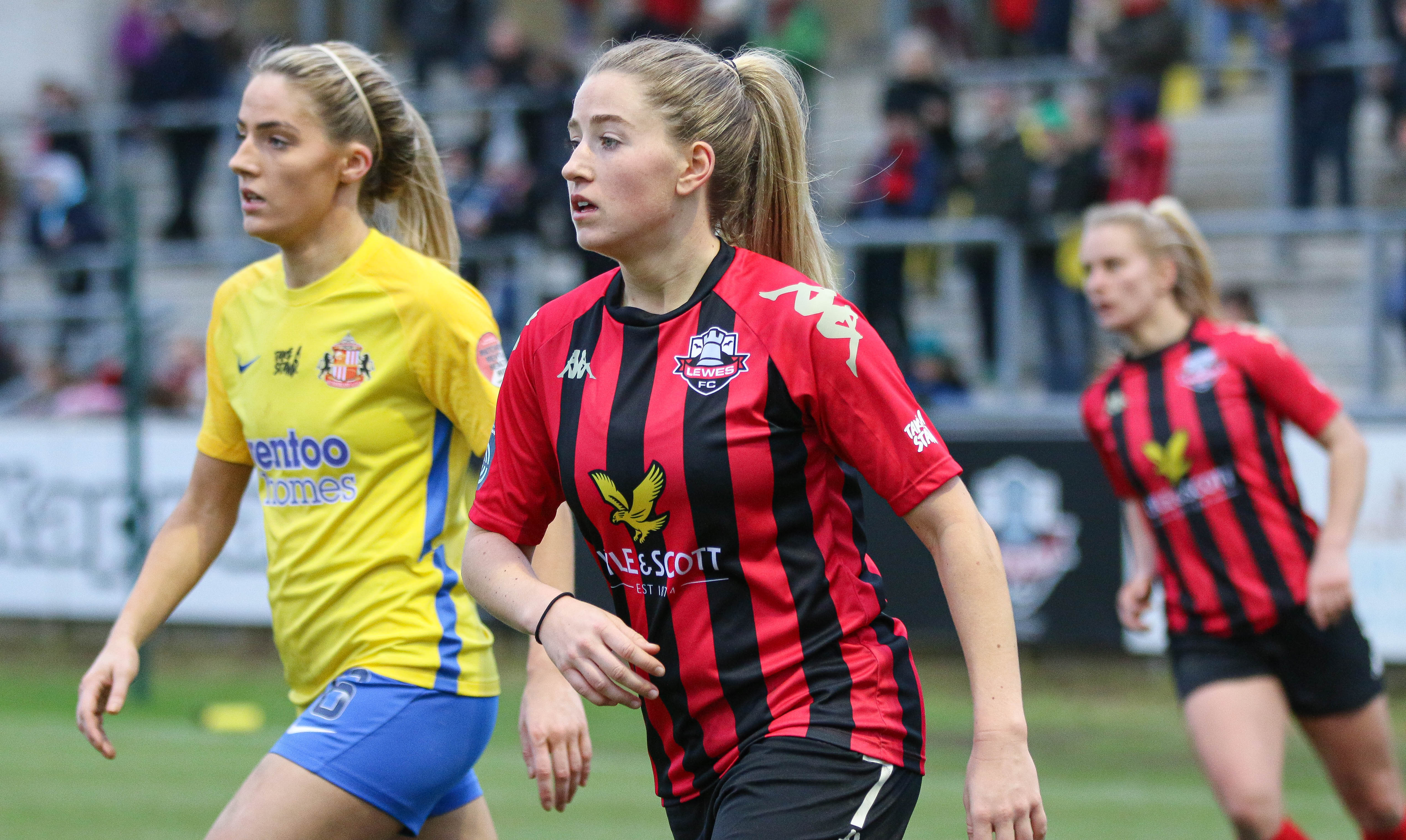

Personal information
- Date of birth: June 25, 1999 (age 27)
- Place of birth: Manchester, England
- Position: Midfielder

Team information
- Current team: Ipswich Town FC

Senior career*
Years	Team	Apps	(Gls)
2021–2022	Lewes	2	(3)
2022–2025	Celtic	34	(12)
2025–2026	Lazio	5	(0)
2026–	Ipswich Town	11	(2)
- * Club domestic league appearances and goals

Lucy Ashworth-Clifford (born 25 June 1999) is an English footballer who plays for Ipswich Town.

== Career ==
On 20 January 2026, Ashworth-Clifford was announced at Ipswich Town on a permanent transfer.
