= Bruna Lourenço =

Portuguese footballer

Personal information
- Full name: Bruna Lourenço Urbano Costa
- Date of birth: April 10, 1999 (age 27)
- Position: Defender

Team information
- Current team: Racing Club de Strasbourg
- Number: 24

Bruna Lourenço Urbano Costa (born 10 April 1999) is a Portuguese footballer who plays as a defender for Celtic. Lourenço had previously played for Sporting CP.

== Honours ==
- Campeonato Nacional: 2016–17, 2017–18
