= Mathilde Carstens =

Danish football player (born 2002)

Personal information
- Full name: Mathilde Bundgaard Carstens
- Date of birth: 7 March 2002 (age 24)
- Place of birth: Frejlev, Denmark
- Position: Midfielder

Team information
- Current team: Brøndby
- Number: 7

Youth career
- 2018–2019: Fortuna Hjørring

Senior career*
Years	Team	Apps	(Gls)
2019–2024	Fortuna Hjørring	84	(9)
2024–2025	Celtic	24	(2)
2025–	Brøndby		

International career^{‡}
2017–2018	Denmark U16	13	(3)
2018–2019	Denmark U17	13	(3)
2019–2020	Denmark U19	7	(0)
2023–	Denmark U23	7	(0)
- * Club domestic league appearances and goals as of 28 March 2025 ‡ National team caps and goals as of 3 April 2025

Mathilde Bundgaard Carstens (born 7 March 2002) is a Danish footballer who plays as a midfielder for A-Liga club Brøndby IF. Carstens previously played for Fortuna Hjørring and Celtic.

== Personal life ==
Mathilde Carstens has a twin sister Signe Carstens who is also a professional footballer.
