= Tara O'Hanlon =

Irish footballer (born 2005)

Personal information
- Date of birth: 14 March 2005 (age 21)
- Place of birth: Republic of Ireland
- Position: Left-back

Team information
- Current team: Wolverhampton Wanderers
- Number: 33

Youth career
- Bohemian
- Peamount United

Senior career*
| Years | Team | Apps | (Gls) |
| –2023 | Peamount United | | |
| 2024–2026 | Manchester City | 0 | (0) |
| 2025–2026 | → Sunderland (loan) | 5 | (0) |
| 2026 | → Celtic (loan) | 12 | (1) |
| 2026– | Wolverhampton Wanderers | 0 | (0) |

International career
| 2022 | Republic of Ireland U17 | 8 | (0) |
| 2022–2023 | Republic of Ireland U19 | 5 | (0) |
| 2023– | Republic of Ireland | 2 | (0) |
- * Club domestic league appearances and goals

Tara O'Hanlon (born 14 March 2005) is an Irish footballer who plays as a left-back for Women's Super League 2 club Wolverhampton Wanderers and the Republic of Ireland national team. She previously played for Peamont United, Manchester City, and on loan for Sunderland and Celtic.

== Early life ==
O'Hanlon attended Castleknock Community College in Fingal in Ireland. She has a sister.

== Club career ==
O'Hanlon played for Bohemian in the 2020 U17 National League season before playing for South Dublin side Peamount United U17 in 2021. She started her senior career with United and helping the club win the League of Ireland Premier Division in 2023.

=== Manchester City, 2024–2026 ===
On 31 January 2024, O'Hanlon signed a three-and-a-half-year contract with Manchester City. Her time at City was marked by a series of injuries: in August 2023, prior to joining Manchester City, she suffered a severe hamstring tear, and repeated the injury two months into the rehabilitation process. O'Hanlon underwent surgery for the injury in May 2024, and her hamstring was again damaged during recovery. In January 2025, she suffered a medial collateral ligament (MCL) tear, and tore her calf shortly before the start of the 2025–26 season. Of the injuries, O'Hanlon described losing her ‘‘love for the game’’ and the positive support she received from her teammates and physios at Manchester City.

==== Loan to Sunderland, 2025–2026 ====
On 4 September 2025, Manchester City announced that O'Hanlon would spend the first half of the 2025–26 season on loan at Sunderland.

==== Loan to Celtic, 2026 ====
On 23 January 2026, Celtic announced that O'Hanlon had joined them on loan to the end of the 2025–26 season.

=== Wolverhampton Wanderers, 2026– ===
On 25 August 2026, O'Hanlon joined recently promoted WSL 2 side Wolverhampton Wanderers. Upon departing Manchester City, O'Hanlon had not made a senior appearance for the club.

== International career ==
O'Hanlon has represented the Republic of Ireland youth teams at under-17 and under-19 level.

In March 2023, O'Hanlon received her first senior call-up to the Republic of Ireland national team. Following a series of injuries that kept her on the sidelines for over two years, O'Hanlon was recalled to the national team in November 2025.

== Style of play ==
O'Hanlon mainly operates as a defender and is known for her speed. She describes herself as an attack-minded full-back who used to play in midfield.
