= Oriam =

Scotland's national centre for sport

Coordinates: 55.9101°N 3.3156°W

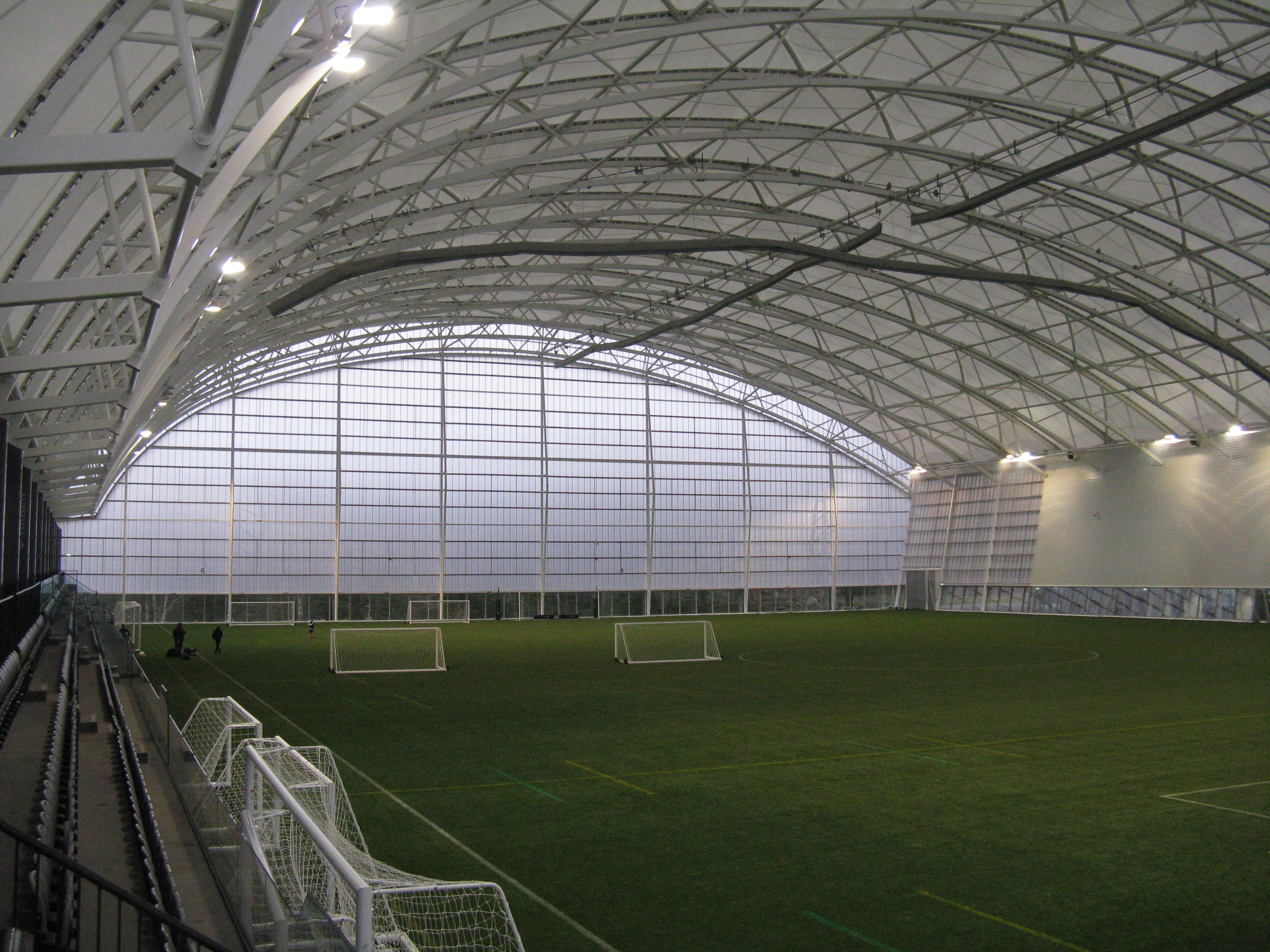
Interior of the main football pitch

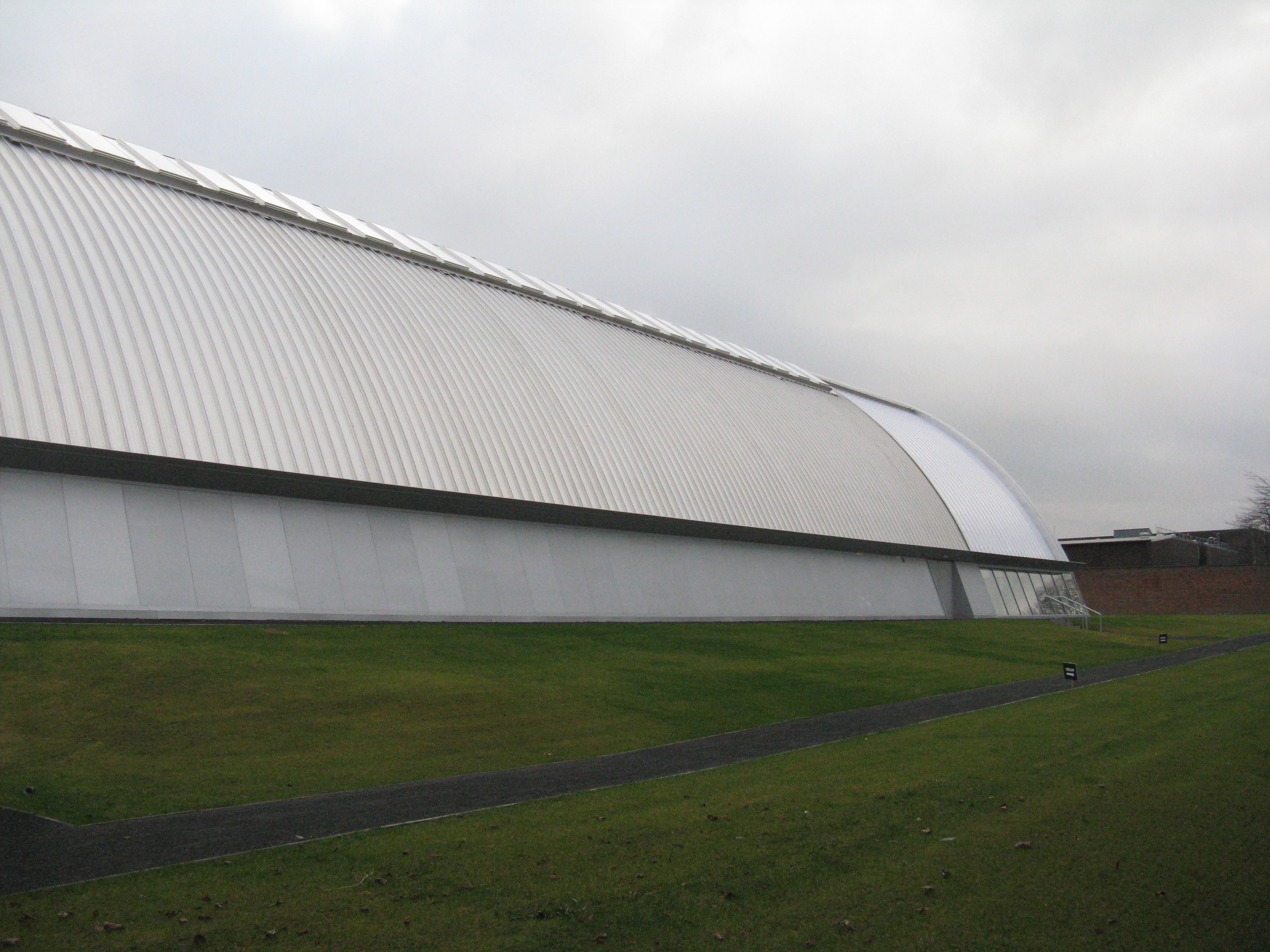
Covered courts at Oriam

Oriam is Scotland's national performance centre for sport, based at Heriot-Watt University's Riccarton campus in Edinburgh. The Scottish Rugby Union and the Scottish Football Association use it as a training facility, and Heart of Midlothian F.C. rent the centre for first-team training and to run their academy. It is also used by other sports teams, students and members of the public.

== History ==
A review of Scottish football, led by former First Minister of Scotland Henry McLeish, picked up on the lack of facilities in Scotland in the first report published in April 2010. In February 2012, Sport Minister Shona Robison announced that £25 million from the Scottish Government's Young Scots Fund would be put towards a new multi-sports centre which would include a national football academy. Universities, colleges and local authorities were invited to bid. By August 2013 there were three finalists. In September 2013, it was announced that the design by Reiach & Hall was chosen. The remaining £9 million towards the cost of building came from Sportscotland, Heriot-Watt University and the City of Edinburgh Council.

Construction work began in March 2015. The £33 million facility opened in August 2016. The indoor football pitch is covered by a curved steel frame with a PVC roof, the shape of which has been likened to the trajectory of "the goal which defied physics" which was scored by Brazilian football player Roberto Carlos against France in 1997. The building won the Future Building section at the 2016 Scottish Design Awards.

== Sports ==
The Scottish Rugby Union and the Scottish Football Association have both made long-term commitments to using Oriam ahead of international fixtures. Heart of Midlothian F.C. use the facility to run their academy and for first-team training. The Scottish Handball Association, basketballscotland and Scottish Netball also use the facility. Furthermore, it is used by the recently formed professional women's team in basketball and handball, both launched in summer 2016. Unlike some elite performance facilities, Oriam will be available to other sports teams, students and members of the public. For the 2016–17 season, Hibernian F.C. will play their under-20 fixtures at Oriam.

In 2021, it was the venue for the Celtic Cup; an annual wheelchair rugby league tournament. It was also chosen as the host venue for the event in 2023 and 2026.

== Facilities ==
The centre has a FIFA-accredited indoor synthetic 3G pitch which is the largest of its type in Europe. Its dimensions of 116 yards by 76 yards are the same size as those of Hampden Park's pitch. At the midpoint of this playing space, the roof is 28m high and there is a 15m playing height at the sides. The space accommodates a viewing area that can seat 500 people. There is also a synthetic pitch outdoors. There are natural surfaces outside too- five grass football pitches and two grass rugby pitches.

Indoors there is a 12-court sports hall, eight squash courts and a four-court sports hall. Other facilities available on the high-performance side of the centre include a HydroWorx 3500i Series hydrotherapy pool with an integrated treadmill, a rehabilitation area and gym area for strength and conditioning.

A 160-bed hotel is to be located on the site, to open in 2017.

== See also ==
Other indoor football facilities in Scotland:

- Toryglen Regional Football Centre (Glasgow)
- Ravenscraig Regional Sports Facility (Motherwell)
- Aberdeen Sports Village (Aberdeen)
