= Maria McAneny =

Scottish footballer (born 2004)

Personal information
- Full name: Maria Christine McAneny
- Date of birth: 25 June 2004 (age 22)
- Place of birth: Wishaw, Scotland
- Position: Midfielder

Team information
- Current team: Celtic
- Number: 73

Youth career
- 2008–2018: EKYC
- 2018–2021: Celtic

Senior career*
Years	Team	Apps	(Gls)
2021–	Celtic	82	(25)
2021–2022	→ Heart of Midlothian (loan)		

International career^{‡}
2018–2020	Scotland U16	5	(4)
2022–2023	Scotland U19	4	(4)
2024–	Scotland U23	4	(0)
2025–	Scotland	4	(2)
- * Club domestic league appearances and goals as of 25 January 2025 ‡ National team caps and goals as of 7 March 2026

Maria Christine McAneny (born 25 June 2004) is a Scottish professional footballer who plays as a midfielder for Celtic of the Scottish Women's Premier League (SWPL) and the Scotland national team. She has also played for Heart of Midlothian.

== Club career ==
Raised in East Kilbride where she attended St Andrew's and St Bride's High School, McAneny first played football in her hometown alongside boys a year older than her. She joined Celtic at the age of 14 and joined the club's modern apprenticeship programme, making her first team debut in April 2021. For the 2021–22 season she joined Heart of Midlothian on loan and performed strongly, being among the nominees for the inaugural PFA Scotland Women's Young Player of the Year award.

After returning to Celtic she became a well-used squad member noted for her versatility (though not an undisputed starter in any position), with the signing of her first full-time professional contract with the club in May 2023 – running to 2026 – followed two days later by victory in the 2022–23 Scottish Women's Cup in which she was in the starting XI against Rangers at Hampden Park.

A member of the group which won the 2023–24 Scottish Women's Premier League title, McAneny was involved less frequently compared to the previous campaign (13 appearances without scoring, compared to two goals in 18 games). In Celtic's 2024–25 UEFA Women's Champions League campaign she featured seven times, coming off the bench on each occasion, as the club qualified for the group stages for the first time but then lost all six matches. She was named as the SWPL Player of the Month for February 2025, with the highlight of her performances being a long-range goal against Glasgow City which was also awarded as the league's best of the period.

On 22 December 2025, McAneny scored from the kick-off of an SWPL fixture away to reigning champions Hibernian, with the goal from the halfway line timed as among the fastest ever. It was later assessed as a Guinness World Record for women's football at 4.10 seconds. On 24 June 2026 Celtic announced that McAneny had extended her contract with the club until the summer 2028.

== International career ==
McAneny featured for Scotland at schoolgirl, under-16 and under-19 youth levels. In 2024 she was selected for the Scotland under-23 team, which plays only friendly matches.

She scored on her senior debut for Scotland in a 1–1 draw away to Ukraine on 28 November 2025.

=== International goals ===
No.	Date	Venue	Opponent	Score	Result	Competition
1.	2 December 2025	Estadio Municipal de Chapín, Jerez de la Frontera, Spain	Ukraine	1–1	1–1	Friendly
2.	7 March 2026	Hampden Park, Glasgow, Scotland	Luxembourg	7–0	7–0	2027 FIFA Women's World Cup qualification

== Personal life ==
Her father Paul McAneny was also a footballer who featured in the lower divisions of the Scottish Football League for teams including Alloa Athletic and Stenhousemuir.
