= Morgan Cross =

Scottish footballer (born 2001)

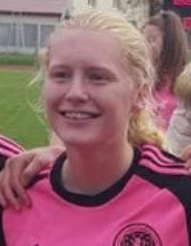
- Cross in 2017

Personal information
- Full name: Morgan Pressley Cross
- Date of birth: 12 February 2001 (age 25)
- Place of birth: Kirkcaldy, Scotland
- Height: 5 ft 4 in (1.63 m)
- Position: Right wing

Team information
- Current team: Celtic
- Number: 17

Youth career
- Central Girls

College career
Years	Team	Apps	(Gls)
2018-2023	South Alabama Jaguars	89	(23)

Senior career*
Years	Team	Apps	(Gls)
2023	Coventry United	11	(1)
2023–2024	Motherwell	28	(10)
2024–	Celtic	42	(13)

International career
2015-2016	Scotland U15		
2017-2018	Scotland U17	13	(5)
2024-2025	Scotland U23	7	(0)
- * Club domestic league appearances and goals

Morgan Pressley Cross (born 12 February 2001) is a Scottish professional footballer who plays as a striker or winger for Scottish Women's Premier League (SWPL) club Celtic. She began her career at Coventry United, before joining Motherwell. She has represented the Scotland women's national team at various youth levels.

== Club career ==
Born in Kirkcaldy, Fife, Cross began her football career with Central Girls at youth level before accepting a five-year scholarship to play collegiate soccer in the United States with the South Alabama Jaguars. During her time there, she scored 23 goals in 89 appearances and played a pivotal role in the team's success at the 2020 Sun Belt Women's Soccer Tournament, scoring twice in the final five minutes to secure the championship and earning the tournament's Most Valuable Player award.

After graduating, Cross moved to England and joined Coventry United on 9 January 2023, although injuries limited her appearances during her time at the club.

On 31 August 2023 she signed for Motherwell where she scored 10 goals in 28 appearances, including a notable goal against Celtic. On 12 September 2024, she completed a deadline day transfer to Celtic, signing a three-year deal alongside Emma Lawton. Cross played her part in the teams victory over Rangers in the 2025-26 Women's Scottish Cup final by scoring the winning goal. She then signed an extension to her contract on 8 June 2026 that would see her remain at the club until 2028.

== International career ==
Cross represented Scotland at youth level, earning 13 caps and scoring 5 goals for Scotland U17s, including a hat-trick in an away fixture against Croatia.

After a six-year absence from international duty, she returned to the national setup in May 2024 with a call-up to the Scotland u23s for a double header against Denmark u23s.
