= Heart of Midlothian W.F.C. =

Hearts Women
- Full name: Heart of Midlothian Women Football Club
- Nicknames: Hearts Women; The Gorgie Girls
- Founded: 2009; 17 years ago
- Ground: Oriam, Edinburgh
- Chairperson: Ann Budge
- Manager: Andy Thomson
- League: SWPL 1
- 2025–26: SWPL 1, 1st of 12
- Website: www.heartsfc.co.uk/pages/hearts-women
Home colours	Away colours	Third colours

Heart of Midlothian Women Football Club, commonly known as Hearts Women, is a Scottish women's football club based in Edinburgh. They are members of the Scottish Women's Premier League (SWPL), the highest level football league in Scotland, and currently compete in its top tier, SWPL 1.

== History ==
In 2009 Hearts took over Musselburgh Windsor Ladies Football Club, changing their name to Hearts Ladies F.C. The name was changed once again in 2018, when the club became known as Hearts Women F.C.

At the December 2018 AGM, Hearts owner Ann Budge announced a "six-figure investment year on year" into Hearts Women, alongside an expansion to their academy in order to integrate the women's team further into the club. Hearts intended to "invest significantly in women and girls' football in 2019 and beyond". This included the recruitment of Kevin Murphy as First Team Manager, who previously oversaw all football operations within Manchester City's Academy Department. Hearts Women hosted two games at Tynecastle in 2019 and clinched the SWPL 2 title with a 3–0 win against Partick Thistle on the final day of the season, gaining promotion to SWPL 1.

Due to the coronavirus pandemic, the SWPL 2020 season was declared null and void. The league reverted to winter football in the 2020–21 season. On 14 July 2020, Kevin Murphy stepped down as First Team Manager to join Rangers as First Team Assistant Coach and Girls Academy Manager, being replaced by previous Hearts Men's first team coach Andy Kirk in August 2020.

In June 2021, Kirk left the club to join Highland League side Brechin City as first team manager. A month later, Eva Olid was announced as the new first team manager. The club achieved their first ever Scottish Women's Premier League title in the 2025–26 season.

== Ground ==
Hearts Women play their home games at The Oriam, Riccarton.

== Honours ==
- Scottish Premier League (1)
  - 2025–26

== Players ==
As of 6 July 2026

=== Current squad ===
Note: Flags indicate national team as defined under FIFA eligibility rules; some limited exceptions apply. Players may hold more than one non-FIFA nationality.

No.	Pos.	Nation	Player
3	DF	SCO	Jessica Husband
4	DF	SCO	Erin Husband
5	DF	SCO	Carly Girasoli
6	MF	SCO	Erin Rennie
7	FW	SCO	Monica Forsyth
8	MF	SCO	Maddie Fulton
9	FW	USA	Mariana Speckmaier
10	FW	ENG	Carly Johns
11	MF	NIR	Lauren Wade
12	FW	IRL	Ellen Dolan
14	MF	SCO	Kayla Jardine
15	MF	SCO	Jenny Smith

No.	Pos.	Nation	Player
18	FW	NIR	Keri Halliday
19	FW	SCO	Ava Crawford
20	DF	SCO	Kate Fraser
21	MF	SCO	Orla Burn
22	MF	SCO	Olivia Chomczuk
23	FW	SCO	Ashley Robertson
25	DF	ENG	Ebonie Locke
33	DF	SCO	Toni Campbell
34	GK	SCO	Erin Anderson
35	MF	SCO	Lucy Horberry
52	GK	SCO	Rachael Johnstone

=== On loan ===
Note: Flags indicate national team as defined under FIFA eligibility rules; some limited exceptions apply. Players may hold more than one non-FIFA nationality.

No.	Pos.	Nation	Player

== Coaching staff ==
As of 31 August 2026

Position	Name
First Team Manager	(Scotland) Andy Thomson
Assistant Coach	(Scotland) Nathan Wallace
Assistant Coach	(Scotland) Lauren Johnstone
Goalkeeping Coach	(Scotland) Derek Gaston
Head of Women's Recruitment	(Scotland) Sean Burt
Head of Girls Academy	(Scotland) Emma Hunter
Operations Manager	(Scotland) Lisa MacFarlane
