= Claire Walsh (footballer) =

Irish footballer (born 1994)

Personal information
- Full name: Claire Walsh
- Date of birth: 28 October 1994 (age 32)
- Place of birth: Kilbride, County Wicklow, Ireland
- Height: 5 ft 9 in (1.75 m)
- Position: Defender

Team information
- Current team: Glasgow City
- Number: 5

Youth career
- Lakeside FC
- Peamount United

College career
| Years | Team | Apps | (Gls) |
| 2012–2015 | Central Connecticut Blue Devils | 59 | (6) |

Senior career*
| Years | Team | Apps | (Gls) |
| 2011–2012 | Peamount United | | |
| 2015–2016 | New England Mutiny | | |
| 2017 | UCD Waves | | |
| 2018–2021 | Peamount United | | |
| 2021–2025 | Glasgow City | 105 | (7) |
| 2025– | Celtic | 25 | (1) |

International career^{‡}
| 2019– | Republic of Ireland | 4 | (0) |
- * Club domestic league appearances and goals as of 4 May 2026 ‡ National team caps and goals as of 4 May 2026

Claire Walsh (born 28 October 1994) is an Irish footballer who plays as a defender for Scottish Women's Premier League (SWPL) club Celtic and the Republic of Ireland national team. A product of the American college soccer system with Central Connecticut Blue Devils, she has previously played club soccer for New England Mutiny in the United States and for Women's National League (WNL) clubs Peamount United and UCD Waves. She has also played inter county Ladies' Gaelic football for her native Wicklow GAA.

== Club career ==
Walsh played for Lakeside FC of Blessington from under-12 to under-15 level, then progressed through Peamount United's youth system. Head coach Eileen Gleeson promoted Walsh into the senior squad at 16 years old for a 2011–12 UEFA Women's Champions League tie against Paris Saint-Germain Féminine. Walsh completed her Leaving Cert in 2012 and accepted an offer to play four years of college soccer for the Central Connecticut State University "Blue Devils".

In May 2015, Walsh signed for Women's Premier Soccer League club New England Mutiny. They reached the East Region final in the 2015 WPSL season, but Walsh was out injured for the 2–0 defeat by Boston Breakers Reserves. Returning in 2016 she made six appearances as New England Mutiny, now playing in United Women's Soccer, finished second in the Eastern Conference.

In the 2017 Women's National League, Walsh played for UCD Waves while completing a master's degree in computer science at University College Dublin. Playing under her former Peamount coach Eileen Gleeson, she captained The Waves to a fourth-place finish in the League and a 1–0 FAI Women's Cup final defeat by Cork City at the Aviva Stadium.

Ahead of the 2018 Women's National League season, Walsh returned to Peamount United: "My main reason for moving would be that I'm finished up studying in UCD. Peamount has always been my club and it's closer to home". In 2019 Walsh displayed good form and was named to the WNL Team of the Season, as The Peas recaptured the League title for the first time since 2011–12. She also played in Peamount's 2018 and 2019 FAI Women's Cup final defeats by Wexford Youths.

After helping Peamount United secure a League and Cup "double" in their 2020 campaign, Walsh signed a two-year professional contract with Scottish Women's Premier League club Glasgow City in July 2021.

== International career ==
While enrolled at University College Dublin, Walsh represented Ireland at the 2017 Summer Universiade. Republic of Ireland coach Colin Bell gave Walsh her first senior call-up for the FIFA Women's World Cup qualifying fixture against Northern Ireland in September 2017.

In August 2019, she won her first senior cap in a 3–0 friendly defeat by the United States at the Rose Bowl in Pasadena, California, under interim manager Tom O'Connor. Walsh entered the match as a substitute for her fellow County Wicklow woman Louise Quinn. She made a competitive substitute appearance in the opening UEFA Women's Euro 2022 qualifier against Montenegro, a 2–0 win at Tallaght Stadium on 3 September 2019.

In April 2021, Walsh started her first game for Ireland, a 1–0 defeat by Belgium at King Baudouin Stadium in Brussels.

Appearances and goals by national team and year
| National team | Year | Apps | Goals |
|---|---|---|---|
| Republic of Ireland | 2019 | 2 | 0 |
| Republic of Ireland | 2021 | 1 | 0 |
| Republic of Ireland | 2022 | 1 | 0 |
| Total | | 4 | 0 |

== Gaelic football ==
After returning from University in the United States, Walsh played Ladies' Gaelic football for Wicklow GAA, competing in the Ladies' National Football League and All-Ireland Intermediate Ladies' Football Championship. She decided to prioritise soccer in 2018.
