= Kelly Clark (footballer) =

Scottish footballer (born 1994)

Personal information
- Date of birth: 10 June 1994 (age 32)
- Place of birth: Arbroath, Scotland
- Position: Defender

Team information
- Current team: Celtic
- Number: 15

Senior career*
Years	Team	Apps	(Gls)
2010–13	Forfar Farmington	37	(7)
2013–	Celtic	314	(2)

International career^{‡}
2022–	Scotland	4	(1)
- * Club domestic league appearances and goals as of 01 May 2023 (UTC) ‡ National team caps and goals as of 13:00, 28 March 2023 (UTC)

Kelly Clark (born 10 June 1994) is a Scottish footballer who plays as a defender for Celtic.

== Career ==
Born in Arbroath, Angus, Clark played for local girls' team Arbroath Inchcape Strollers before joining Scottish Women's Premier League club Forfar Farmington in 2010, making her senior debut that year aged 15. After moving away to attend the University of Stirling, she signed for another top-flight team, Celtic, in January 2013. She has won the 2022 Scottish Women's Cup and 2021 Scottish Women's Premier League Cup with Celtic .

Also won the League in season 23/24
