= Shannon McGregor =

Scottish association football player (born 1999)

Personal information
- Full name: Shannon Joan McGregor
- Date of birth: 7 December 1999 (age 26)
- Place of birth: Aberdeen, Scotland
- Position: Midfielder

Team information
- Current team: Celtic
- Number: 14

Senior career*
Years	Team	Apps	(Gls)
- Aberdeen
2017–2024	Hibernian	43+	(6+)
2024–	Celtic	30	(4)

International career
2014	Scotland U16	1	(0)
2015–2016	Scotland U17	3	(1)
2016–2018	Scotland U19	12	(0)
2024–	Scotland	1	(0)
- * Club domestic league appearances and goals as of 14 October 2024

Shannon Joan McGregor (born 7 December 1999) is a Scottish footballer who plays as a midfielder for Celtic and the Scotland national team.

== Club career ==
She began her career at hometown club Aberdeen before joining Hibernian in December 2017, aged 18. She won three trophies and made well over 100 appearances for the Edinburgh club, also recovering from two serious ACL injuries, before joining Celtic in 2024. On 26 June 2026 Celtic announced that McGregor would extend her contract with the club until the summer of 2027.

== International career ==
She has represented Scotland at various youth levels. She received a first call-up to the senior squad in October 2024, and made her full international debut that month in a Euro 2025 play-off against Hungary.

== Personal life ==
In June 2022, McGregor became engaged to Hibernian teammate Siobhan Hunter on holiday in Tenerife. In January 2024, both were given a leave of absence by the club after Hunter's mother suffered serious injuries in an accidental fall, coincidentally also occurring in Tenerife.

== Honours ==
Hibernian

- Scottish Women's Cup: 2018; runner-up 2019
- Scottish Women's Premier League Cup: 2018, 2019; runner-up 2022–23

Celtic

- Scottish Women's Cup: 2025-26;
