= Emma Lawton =

Scottish footballer

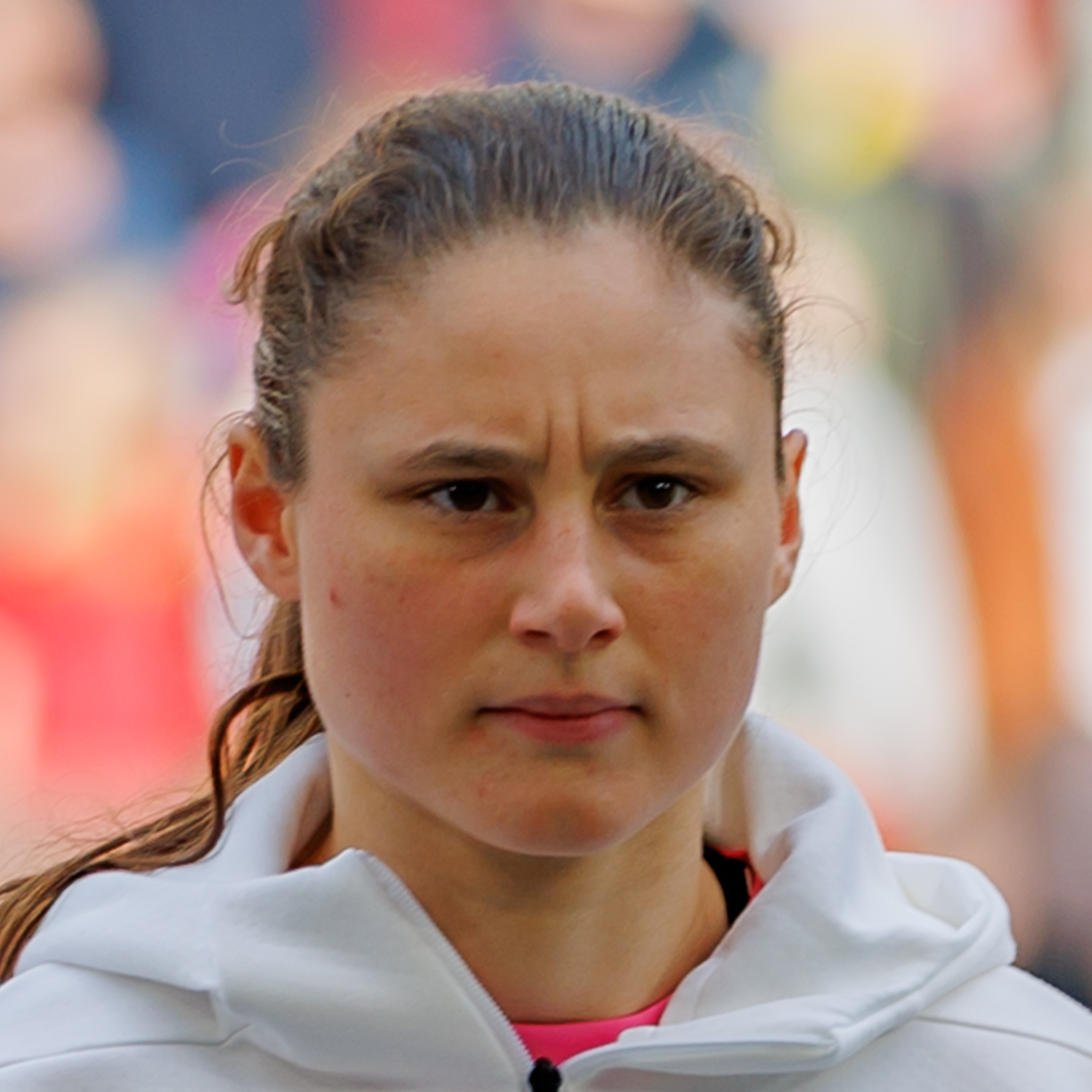
- Lawton lining up for Scotland, 2025

Personal information
- Full name: Emma Louise Lawton
- Date of birth: 26 July 2001 (age 25)
- Place of birth: Wishaw, Lanarkshire, Scotland
- Position: Right back

Youth career
- Celtic

Senior career*
Years	Team	Apps	(Gls)
2017–2019	Partick Thistle		
2020–2022	Manchester City	0	(0)
2022–2023	Motherwell	23	(0)
2023–2024	Partick Thistle	35	(5)
2024–2026	Celtic	50	(7)
2026–	Ipswich Town	0	(0)

International career^{‡}
2023–2024	Scotland U23	5	(0)
2025–	Scotland	12	(2)
- * Club domestic league appearances and goals as of 10 March 2026 ‡ National team caps and goals as of 10 March 2026

Emma Louise Lawton (born 26 July 2001) is a Scottish professional footballer who plays as a right back for Women's Super League 2 club Ipswich Town and for the Scotland women's national team.

Her previous clubs include Partick Thistle (two spells) and Motherwell.

== Club career ==
Raised in East Kilbride, Lawton played for Celtic as a youth player but joined Partick Thistle aged 15, immediately participating at senior level albeit in the SWFL First Division South (the regionalised amateur third tier); she helped Partick gain promotion to the Scottish Women's Premier League-2 in 2018. In late 2019 she joined Manchester City, although only featured for the English club's development side in a spell which was also interrupted by the COVID-19 pandemic.

In July 2022, Lawton returned to Scotland and signed for SWPL-1 team Motherwell, where she spent one season before re-joining Partick Thistle, now also members of the top tier. During the 2023–24 season, Partick reached their first major final – losing 4–1 to Rangers in the SWPL Cup – and finished in the league's top six, with Lawton named in the PFA Scotland SWPL Team of the Year and as the club's Player of the Year. She agreed a new contract with Partick and began the following campaign with the Jags, but joined Celtic on a full-time contract on 12 September 2024 (transfer deadline day) along with Motherwell's Morgan Cross. She quickly impressed with performances in the SWPL and the UEFA Women's Champions League.

On 26 June 2026, Celtic announced that Lawton was leaving the club after making 71 appearances and scoring 15 goals.

On 15 July 2026, Lawton was announced at Ipswich Town.

== International career ==
Lawton was selected for the Scotland under-23 team, which plays only friendly matches, in 2023 and 2024.

She received her first call-up to the senior Scotland squad in February 2025, making her debut as a starter in a 1–0 2025 UEFA Women's Nations League defeat away to Austria, and scoring her first international goal four days later in a 2–1 loss to the Netherlands at Hampden Park.

== Personal life ==
Lawton has studied and trained as a sports coach, achieving a BA in Football Coaching and Management from the UCFB in 2022, and holding a UEFA B licence by 2024.
