= 2023–24 Celtic F.C. Women season =

Celtic F.C.
2023–24 season
- Manager: Fran Alonso (until 22 December); Elena Sadiku (From 12 January)
- Stadium: Excelsior Stadium, Airdrie
- SWPL 1: 1st
- Scottish Cup: Semi-finals
- SWPL Cup: Semi-finals
- Top goalscorer: League: Amy Gallacher (25 goals); All: Amy Gallacher (28 goals)
| Home colours | Away colours | Third colours |

The 2023–24 season was Celtic Women's 17th season of competitive football.

== Pre-season and friendlies ==
Celtic played in the Glasgow Cup before returning to Puerto de Mogán in Gran Canaria on a pre-season training camp where they would play in two friendly matches.

| 26 July 2023 Glasgow Cup semi-final | Celtic | 4-0 | Partick Thistle | Airdrie |
| | Hayes 12', 61'; Craig 13'; Ross 78' | Report | | Stadium: Excelsior Stadium |

| 29 July 23 Glasgow Cup final | Rangers | 2-1 | Celtic | Cumbernauld |
| | Maclean 90'; Howat 90+8' | Report | Gallacher 6' | Stadium: Broadwood Stadium |

| 3 August 2023 Friendly | Femarguin | 0-2 | Celtic |
| | | Report | Burchill 61'; 88' (o.g.) |

| 5 August 2023 Friendly | Tenerife | 2-2 | Celtic |
| | Delgado 73'; Blanco 76' | Report | Partido 11', 22' |

== Scottish Women's Premier League ==
Celtic won their first title on the final day of the season with Amy Gallacher scoring a last minute winner to win the Scottish Women's Premier League on goal difference from Rangers.

| 13 August 2023 | Montrose | 0-9 | Celtic | Montrose |
| | | Report | Loferski 3', 21', 37', 89'; Carter 14' (o.g.); Craig 23'; Gallacher 46', 70'; Addi 67' | Stadium: Links Park |

| 20 August 2023 | Celtic | 7-1 | Hamilton Academical | Airdrie |
| | Loferski 5'; Gallacher 6', 30'; Craig 17'; Mengyu 48'; Burchill 78'; Barclais 90+1' | Report | Giard 38' | Stadium: Excelsior Stadium |

| 23 August 2023 | Spartans | 0-5 | Celtic | Edinburgh |
| | | Report | Menglu 5'; Craig 26'; Gallacher 48'; Hayes 86'; Goldie 87' | Stadium: Ainslie Park |

| 27 August 2023 | Celtic | 9-0 | Dundee United | Airdrie |
| | McAneny 7'; Ross 11', 41'; Craig 19'; Cavanagh 24'; Burchill 32'; Gallacher 63'; Sharkey 81'; Loferski 85' | Report | | Stadium: Excelsior Stadium |

| 3 September 2023 | Hibernian | 2-4 | Celtic | Edinburgh |
| | Adams 45'; Baucom 45+3' | Report | Gallacher 5', 31', 70'; Cavanagh 14' | Stadium: Meadowbank Stadium |

| 13 September 2023 | Celtic | 3-2 | Hearts | Airdrie |
| | Hayes 9'; Partido 34'; Menglu 50' | Report | McGinley 4'; Girasoli 7' | Stadium: Excelsior Stadium |

| 17 September 2023 | Aberdeen | 0-4 | Celtic | Cove Bay |
| | | Report | Craig 41'; Menglu 74'; Smith 77', 85' | Stadium: Balmoral Stadium |

| 5 October 2023 | Celtic | 2-1 | Glasgow City | Airdrie |
| | Craig 70' (pen.); Cavanagh 89' | Report | Davidson 77' | Stadium: Excelsior Stadium |

| 8 October 2023 | Celtic | 6-0 | Motherwell | Airdrie |
| | Gallacher 13', 43'; Loferski 17', 31'; Craig 22'; Burchill 56' | Report | | Stadium: Excelsior Stadium |

| 15 October 2023 | Partick Thistle | 0-3 | Celtic | Glasgow |
| | | Report | Partido 30'; Agnew 68'; Craig 76' | Stadium: Petershill Park |

| 22 October 2023 | Celtic | 1-2 | Rangers | Airdrie |
| | Hayes 53' | Report | Maclean 59'; Hardy 81' | Stadium: Excelsior Stadium |

| 5 November 2023 | Dundee Utd | 0-2 | Celtic | Dundee |
| | | Report | Addi 23'; Burchill 70' | Stadium: Foundation Park |

| 19 November 2023 | Hamilton Academical | 0-5 | Celtic | Hamilton |
| | | Report | Hayes 18'; Gallacher 34'; Craig 49'; Addi 63'; Barclais 67' | Stadium: New Douglas Park |

| 26 November 2023 | Celtic | 13-0 | Aberdeen | Airdrie |
| | Cavanagh 7'; Agnew 8', 15', 65'; Partido 19'; Ross 28', 64'; Craig 40'; Gallacher 50', 77', 90+1'; Goldie 78'; Hayes 80' | Report | | Stadium: Excelsior Stadium |

| 10 December 2023 | Celtic | 7-0 | Spartans | Airdrie |
| | Hayes 51', 80'; Gallacher 61'; Smith 66'; Goldie 73'; Barclais 77'; Agnew 90' | Report | | Stadium: Excelsior Stadium |

| 17 December 2023 | Hearts | 1-1 | Celtic | Edinburgh |
| | Timms 8' | Report | Hayes 56' | Stadium: Oriam |

| 14 January 2024 | Celtic | 9-0 | Montrose | Airdrie |
| | Menglu 4'; Gallacher 13', 77'; Burchill 23', 49'; Cavanagh 55'; Clark 57'; Cummings 89'; Agnew 90+5' | Report | | Stadium: Excelsior Stadium |

| 28 January 2024 | Glasgow City | 1-0 | Celtic | Glasgow |
| | Brown 1' | Report | | Stadium: Petershill Park |

| 7 February 2024 | Motherwell | 0-2 | Celtic | East Kilbride |
| | | Report | Hayes 28'; Gallacher 81' | Stadium: K-Park Training Academy |

| 11 February 2024 | Hibernian | 1-3 | Celtic | Edinburgh |
| | Baucom 23' | Report | Flint 13', 43'; Hayes 31' | Stadium: Meadowbank Stadium |

| 18 February 2024 | Rangers | 1-1 | Celtic | Glasgow |
| | McAulay 70' | Report | Flint 46' | Stadium: Ibrox Stadium |

| 3 March 2024 | Celtic | 6-1 | Partick Thistle | Airdrie |
| | Gallacher 5', 19', 86'; Agnew 14'; Flint 43'; Smith 83' | Report | Henderson 25' | Stadium: Excelsior Stadium |

| 17 March 2024 | Celtic | 2-1 | Rangers | Airdrie |
| | Flint 4', 42' | Report | Ross 78' | Stadium: Excelsior Stadium |

| 31 March 2024 | Glasgow City | 1-2 | Celtic | Glasgow |
| | Giammona 90' | Report | Hayes 37'; Flint 56' | Stadium: Petershill Park |

| 14 April 2024 | Partick Thistle | 0-5 | Celtic | Glasgow |
| | | Report | Hayes 9'; Flint 26', 44'; Agnew 29', 65' | Stadium: Petershill Park |

| 17 April 2024 | Celtic | 1-0 | Hibernian | Airdrie |
| | Hayes 21' | Report | | Stadium: Excelsior Stadium |

| 21 April 2024 | Celtic | 5-0 | Hearts | Glasgow |
| | Ashworth-Clifford 3'; Agnew 24', 29', 60'; Flint 53' | Report | | Stadium: Celtic Park |

| 1 May 2024 | Celtic | 2-2 | Glasgow City | Airdrie |
| | Gibson 18' (o.g.); Hayes 45+1' | Report | Lauder 4'; Wardlaw 59' | Stadium: Excelsior Stadium |

| 6 May 2024 | Rangers | 0-0 | Celtic | Cumbernauld |
| | | Report | | Stadium: Broadwood Stadium |

| 12 May 2024 | Celtic | 3-0 | Partick Thistle | Airdrie |
| | Gallacher 10'; Agnew 63'; Mengyu 65' | Report | | Stadium: Excelsior Stadium |

| 15 May 2024 | Hearts | 1-3 | Celtic | Edinburgh |
| | Waldie 83' | Report | Flint 17', 35'; Gallacher 31' | Stadium: Oriam |

| 19 May 2024 | Celtic | 1-0 | Hibernian | Glasgow |
| | Gallacher 90' | Report | | Stadium: Celtic Park |

== Scottish Women's Cup ==
On 8 November 2023, Celtic were drawn to face Ayr United in the third round of the 2023-24 Scottish Women's Cup, On 8 January 2024, Celtic were drawn to face Hamilton Academical in the fourth round. On 5 February, Celtic were drawn to face Montrose in the quarter-finals. On 29 March, Celtic were drawn to face Rangers in the semi-finals.

| 7 January 2024 3rd round | Ayr United | 0-7 | Celtic | Cumnock |
| | | Report | Ross 6', 81'; Gallacher 15', 48'; Mengyu 58'; Cavanagh 66'; Cummings 90' | Stadium: Townhead Park |

| 4 February 2024 4th Round | Hamilton Academical | 0-6 | Celtic | Hamilton |
| | | Report | Ross 25', 28', 40'; Craig 53'; Graham 68' (o.g.); Hayes 83' | Stadium: New Douglas Park |

| 10 March 2024 Quarter-final | Montrose | 0-6 | Celtic | Montrose |
| | | Report | Loferski 5', 8'; Smith 42'; Mengyu 60'; Hayes 60'; Agnew 83' | Stadium: Links Park |

| 27 April 2024 Semi final | Rangers | 2-0 | Celtic | Glasgow |
| | Cornet 83'; Howat 89' | Report | | Stadium: Hampden Park |

== Scottish Women's Premier League Cup ==
On 31 July 2023, Celtic were drawn to face Hamilton Academical in the Second round of the 2023-24 SWPL Cup, On 5 October 2023, Celtic were drawn to face Glasgow City in the quarter-finals. On 16 November, Celtic were drawn to face Rangers in the semi-finals.

| 1 October 2023 2nd round | Hamilton Academical | 0-6 | Celtic | Hamilton |
| | | Report | Menglu 3'; Hayes 6'; Partido 15'; Barclais 22'; Addi 67'; Cavanagh 75' | Stadium: New Douglas Park |

| 10 November 2023 Quarter final | Celtic | 3-0 | Glasgow City | Airdrie |
| | Ross 7'; Gallacher 52'; Loferski 71' | Report | | Stadium: Excelsior Stadium |

| 19 January 2024 Semi final | Celtic | 2-3 | Rangers | Airdrie |
| | Craig 15' (pen.), 89' (pen.) | Report | Hill 68'; Maclean 80'; Hardy 90+5' (pen.) | Stadium: Excelsior Stadium |

== 2023-24 UEFA Women's Champions League Qualifying ==
Celtic competed in Round 1 of the 2023–24 UEFA Women's Champions League, taking part in Mini-Tournament 4 of the league path, hosted by Vålerenga.

| 6 September 2023 Semi final | Brondby | 0-1 | Celtic | Oslo |
| | | Report | Clark 69' | Stadium: Intility Arena |

| 9 September 2023 Final | Vålerenga | 2-2 (a.e.t.) (11–10 p) | Celtic | Oslo |
| | Tvedten 5' Thorsnes 120+3' (pen.) | Report | Loferski 9'; Smith 116' | Stadium: Intility Arena |
| | Penalties |
| | Thorsnes (penalty scored); Tvedten (penalty scored); Thomsen (penalty scored); Löfwenius (penalty scored); Sigurðardóttir (penalty scored); Kovacs (penalty scored); Vickius (penalty scored); Brekken (penalty scored); Pechersky (penalty scored); Pettersen (penalty scored); Rogic (penalty scored) | | (penalty scored) Clark; (penalty scored) McAneny; (penalty scored) Partido; (penalty scored) Craig; (penalty scored) Shen Mengyu; (penalty scored) Burchill; (penalty scored) Shen Menglu; (penalty scored) Agnew; (penalty scored) Hayes; (penalty scored) Goldie; (penalty missed) Daugherty |

== Players ==
As of 15 August 2025

Note: Flags indicate national team as defined under FIFA eligibility rules; some limited exceptions apply. Players may hold more than one non-FIFA nationality.

| No. | Pos. | Nation | Player |
|---|---|---|---|
| 1 | GK | SCO | Chloe Logan |
| 2 | DF | FRA | Celya Barclais |
| 3 | DF | GUY | Sydney Cummings |
| 4 | MF | SCO | Lisa Robertson |
| 5 | MF | SCO | Natalie Ross |
| 6 | DF | SCO | Chloe Craig |
| 7 | FW | SCO | Amy Gallacher |
| 8 | MF | SCO | Jenny Smith |
| 9 | MF | CHN | Shen Mengyu |
| 11 | MF | SCO | Colette Cavanagh |
| 12 | FW | USA | Murphy Agnew |
| 15 | DF | SCO | Kelly Clark (captain) |
| 16 | DF | USA | Hana Kerner |
| 18 | DF | IRL | Caitlin Hayes |
| 20 | MF | ESP | Paula Partido |

| No. | Pos. | Nation | Player |
|---|---|---|---|
| 21 | FW | USA | Kit Loferski |
| 22 | MF | ENG | Lucy Ashworth-Clifford |
| 26 | FW | ENG | Natasha Flint |
| 27 | FW | SCO | Tiree Burchill |
| 28 | MF | CHN | Shen Menglu |
| 29 | GK | SCO | Lisa Rodgers |
| 30 | GK | USA | Kelsey Daugherty |
| 41 | MF | SCO | Clare Goldie |
| 43 | MF | SCO | Lucy Barclay |
| 46 | FW | SCO | Amy Sharkey |
| 50 | MF | SCO | Maisie Stewart |
| 53 | DF | SCO | Sophie Timlin |
| 60 | DF | SCO | Olivia McStay |
| 73 | MF | SCO | Maria McAneny |
| 97 | MF | MAR | Nour Imane Addi |

=== Players who left during the season ===
Note: Flags indicate national team as defined under FIFA eligibility rules; some limited exceptions apply. Players may hold more than one non-FIFA nationality.

| No. | Pos. | Nation | Player |
|---|---|---|---|
| 52 | GK | SCO | Rachael Johnstone |

== Player Statistics ==
=== Appearances and goals ===
List of player appearances, substitute appearances in brackets. goals and assists for each competition including totals

Key

Aps = Appearances (Subs)

Gls = Goals

Asts = Assists

Celtic FC Women – 2023–24 Player Statistics by Competition
| Player | Position | SWPL 1 | | | Scottish Cup | | | League Cup | | | UEFA Women's Champions League | | | Total Apps | Total Goals | Total Assists |
| | | Aps | Gls | Asts | Aps | Gls | Asts | Aps | Gls | Asts | Aps | Gls | Asts | | | |
|---|---|---|---|---|---|---|---|---|---|---|---|---|---|---|---|---|
| Chloe Logan | GK | 5 | 0 | 0 | 2 | 0 | 0 | 0 | 0 | 0 | 0 | 0 | 0 | 7 | 0 | 0 |
| Lisa Rodgers | GK | 0 | 0 | 0 | 0 | 0 | 0 | 0 | 0 | 0 | 0 | 0 | 0 | 0 | 0 | 0 |
| Kelsey Daugherty | GK | 27 | 0 | 0 | 2 | 0 | 0 | 3 | 0 | 0 | 2 | 0 | 0 | 34 | 0 | 0 |
| Celya Barclais | DF | 12(11) | 3 | 1 | 2 | 0 | 1 | 2 | 1 | 0 | 1(1) | 0 | 0 | 17(12) | 4 | 2 |
| Sydney Cummings | DF | 4(6) | 1 | 0 | 2(1) | 1 | 0 | 0(1) | 0 | 0 | 0 | 0 | 0 | 6(8) | 2 | 0 |
| Chloe Craig | DF | 31(1) | 9 | 4 | 2(2) | 1 | 1 | 3 | 2 | 1 | 2 | 0 | 1 | 38(3) | 12 | 7 |
| Kelly Clark | DF | 31 | 2 | 2 | 2 | 0 | 0 | 3 | 0 | 0 | 2 | 1 | 0 | 38 | 3 | 2 |
| Caitlin Hayes | DF | 29(1) | 14 | 10 | 4 | 2 | 1 | 3 | 1 | 0 | 2 | 0 | 0 | 38(1) | 17 | 11 |
| Sophie Timlin | DF | 0(1) | 0 | 0 | 0 | 0 | 0 | 0 | 0 | 0 | 0 | 0 | 0 | 0(1) | 0 | 0 |
| Olivia McStay | DF | 0(1) | 0 | 0 | 0 | 0 | 0 | 0 | 0 | 0 | 0 | 0 | 0 | 0(1) | 0 | 0 |
| Lucy Barclay | MF | 0 | 0 | 0 | 0(1) | 0 | 1 | 0 | 0 | 0 | 0 | 0 | 0 | 0(1) | 0 | 1 |
| Lisa Robertson | MF | 0(4) | 0 | 0 | 0 | 0 | 0 | 0 | 0 | 0 | 0 | 0 | 0 | 0(4) | 0 | 0 |
| Natalie Ross | MF | 27(4) | 4 | 9 | 3 | 5 | 2 | 2 | 1 | 0 | 1(1) | 0 | 0 | 33(5) | 10 | 11 |
| Jenny Smith | MF | 12(14) | 4 | 2 | 3(1) | 1 | 0 | 0(3) | 0 | 1 | 2 | 1 | 0 | 17(18) | 6 | 3 |
| Shen Mengyu | MF | 20(8) | 2 | 10 | 3 | 2 | 2 | 2 | 0 | 0 | 2 | 0 | 0 | 27(8) | 4 | 12 |
| Shen Menglu | MF | 17(10) | 4 | 7 | 1(1) | 0 | 2 | 3 | 1 | 1 | 1(1) | 0 | 0 | 22(12) | 5 | 10 |
| Colette Cavanagh | MF | 21(8) | 5 | 4 | 4 | 1 | 0 | 2(1) | 1 | 1 | 2 | 0 | 0 | 29(9) | 7 | 5 |
| Clare Goldie | MF | 3(16) | 3 | 0 | 2 | 0 | 0 | 1(2) | 0 | 1 | 0(1) | 0 | 0 | 6(19) | 3 | 1 |
| Nour Imane Addi | MF | 3(6) | 3 | 2 | 0(2) | 0 | 0 | 1 | 1 | 0 | 0(1) | 0 | 0 | 4(9) | 4 | 2 |
| Maria McAneny | MF | 4(9) | 1 | 5 | 2(1) | 0 | 2 | 0 | 0 | 0 | 0(2) | 0 | 0 | 6(12) | 1 | 7 |
| Paula Partido | MF | 17(6) | 3 | 7 | 2 | 0 | 0 | 3 | 1 | 1 | 1(1) | 0 | 0 | 23(7) | 4 | 8 |
| Maisie Stewart | MF | 0(1) | 0 | 0 | 0 | 0 | 0 | 0 | 0 | 0 | 0 | 0 | 0 | 0(1) | 0 | 0 |
| Lucy Ashworth-Clifford | MF | 9(5) | 1 | 2 | 2 | 0 | 1 | 0(1) | 0 | 0 | 0 | 0 | 0 | 11(6) | 1 | 3 |
| Amy Gallacher | FW | 29(1) | 25 | 19 | 2(2) | 2 | 1 | 2(1) | 1 | 0 | 2 | 0 | 1 | 35(4) | 28 | 21 |
| Kit Loferski | FW | 14(9) | 8 | 8 | 1(1) | 2 | 0 | 1(1) | 1 | 0 | 2 | 1 | 0 | 18(11) | 12 | 8 |
| Tiree Burchill | FW | 3(13) | 6 | 1 | 0(3) | 0 | 0 | 0(2) | 0 | 1 | 0(2) | 0 | 0 | 3(20) | 6 | 2 |
| Murphy Agnew | FW | 19(9) | 13 | 9 | 2(1) | 1 | 1 | 2(1) | 0 | 1 | 0(1) | 0 | 1 | 23(12) | 14 | 12 |
| Amy Sharkey | FW | 0(3) | 1 | 0 | 0(1) | 0 | 0 | 0(1) | 0 | 0 | 0 | 0 | 0 | 0(5) | 1 | 0 |
| Natasha Flint | FW | 14 | 12 | 3 | 1(1) | 0 | 0 | 0 | 0 | 0 | 0 | 0 | 0 | 15(1) | 12 | 3 |

=== Goalscorers ===
| R | No. | Pos. | Nation | Name | Premiership | Scottish Cup | League Cup | Champions League | Total |
|---|---|---|---|---|---|---|---|---|---|
| 1 | 7 | FW | (Scotland) | Amy Gallacher | 25 | 2 | 1 | 0 | 28 |
| 2 | 18 | DF | (Republic of Ireland) | Caitlin Hayes | 14 | 2 | 1 | 0 | 17 |
| 3 | 12 | FW | (United States) | Murphy Agnew | 13 | 1 | 0 | 0 | 14 |
| 4 | 6 | DF | (Scotland) | Chloe Craig | 9 | 1 | 2 | 0 | 12 |
| 4 | 26 | FW | (England) | Natasha Flint | 12 | 0 | 0 | 0 | 12 |
| 4 | 21 | FW | (United States) | Kit Loferski | 8 | 2 | 1 | 1 | 12 |
| 7 | 5 | MF | (Scotland) | Natalie Ross | 4 | 5 | 1 | 0 | 10 |
| 8 | 11 | MF | (Scotland) | Colette Cavanagh | 5 | 1 | 1 | 0 | 7 |
| 9 | 8 | MF | (Scotland) | Jenny Smith | 4 | 1 | 0 | 1 | 6 |
| 9 | 27 | FW | (Scotland) | Tiree Burchill | 6 | 0 | 0 | 0 | 6 |
| 11 | 28 | MF | (China) | Shen Menglu | 4 | 0 | 1 | 0 | 5 |
| 12 | 2 | DF | (France) | Celya Barclais | 3 | 0 | 1 | 0 | 4 |
| 12 | 9 | MF | (China) | Shen Mengyu | 2 | 2 | 0 | 0 | 4 |
| 12 | 97 | MF | (Morocco) | Nour Imane Addi | 3 | 0 | 1 | 0 | 4 |
| 12 | 9 | MF | (Spain) | Paula Partido | 3 | 0 | 1 | 0 | 4 |
| 16 | 41 | MF | (Scotland) | Clare Goldie | 3 | 0 | 0 | 0 | 3 |
| 16 | 15 | DF | (Scotland) | Kelly Clark | 2 | 0 | 0 | 1 | 3 |
| 18 | 3 | DF | (Guyana) | Sydney Cummings | 1 | 1 | 0 | 0 | 2 |
| 19 | 73 | MF | (Scotland) | Maria McAneny | 1 | 0 | 0 | 0 | 1 |
| 19 | 22 | MF | (England) | Lucy Ashworth-Clifford | 1 | 0 | 0 | 0 | 1 |
| 19 | 46 | FW | (Scotland) | Amy Sharkey | 1 | 0 | 0 | 0 | 1 |
| Own goals | | | | | 2 | 1 | 0 | 0 | 3 |
| Total | | | | | 126 | 19 | 11 | 3 | 159 |

Last updated: 24 May 2025

=== Hat-tricks ===
| Player | Against | Result | Date | Competition |
|---|---|---|---|---|
| (Scotland) Amy Gallacher | (Scotland) Hibernian | 4-2 (A) | 3 September 2023 | League |
| (Scotland) Amy Gallacher | (Scotland) Aberdeen | 13-0 (H) | 26 November 2023 | League |
| (Scotland) Amy Gallacher | (Scotland) Partick Thistle | 6-1 (H) | 3 March 2024 | League |
| (United States) Murphy Agnew | (Scotland) Aberdeen | 13-0 (H) | 26 November 2023 | League |
| (United States) Murphy Agnew | (Scotland) Hearts | 5-0 (H) | 21 April 2024 | League |
| (United States) Kit Loferski | (Scotland) Montrose | 9-0 (A) | 13 August 2023 | League |
| (Scotland) Natalie Ross | (Scotland) Hamilton Academical | 6-0 (A) | 4 February 2024 | Scottish Cup |

(H) – Home; (A) – Away; (N) – Neutral

=== Clean sheets ===
As of 24 May 2025.

| Rank | Name | Premiership | Scottish Cup | League Cup | Champions League | Total | Played Games |
|---|---|---|---|---|---|---|---|
| 1 | (United States) Kelsey Daugherty | 14 | 1 | 2 | 1 | 18 | 34 |
| 2 | (Scotland) Chloe Logan | 4 | 2 | 0 | 0 | 6 | 7 |
| Total | | 18 | 3 | 2 | 1 | 24 | 41 |

== Team Statistics ==
=== Regulars season ===
| Pos | Team | Pld | W | D | L | GF | GA | GD | Pts | Qualification or relegation |
|---|---|---|---|---|---|---|---|---|---|---|
| 1 | Rangers | 22 | 19 | 3 | 0 | 92 | 10 | +82 | 60 | Qualification for the Top six |
| 2 | Celtic | 22 | 18 | 2 | 2 | 102 | 13 | +89 | 56 | Qualification for the Top six |
| 3 | Glasgow City | 22 | 18 | 2 | 2 | 72 | 13 | +59 | 56 | Qualification for the Top six |
| 4 | Hibernian | 22 | 12 | 3 | 7 | 60 | 32 | +28 | 39 | Qualification for the Top six |
| 5 | Heart of Midlothian | 22 | 13 | 3 | 6 | 58 | 22 | +36 | 42 | Qualification for the Top six |
| 6 | Partick Thistle | 22 | 12 | 2 | 8 | 35 | 35 | 0 | 38 | Qualification for the Top six |
| 7 | Aberdeen | 22 | 8 | 1 | 13 | 34 | 72 | −38 | 25 | Qualification for the Bottom six |
| 8 | Motherwell | 22 | 6 | 1 | 15 | 30 | 56 | −26 | 19 | Qualification for the Bottom six |
| 9 | Spartans | 22 | 3 | 4 | 15 | 26 | 57 | −31 | 13 | Qualification for the Bottom six |
| 10 | Montrose | 22 | 3 | 4 | 15 | 25 | 86 | −61 | 13 | Qualification for the Bottom six |
| 11 | Dundee United | 22 | 3 | 1 | 18 | 19 | 86 | −67 | 10 | Qualification for the Bottom six |
| 12 | Hamilton Academical | 22 | 2 | 4 | 16 | 17 | 88 | −71 | 10 | Qualification for the Bottom six |

Rules for classification: 1) Points; 2) Goal difference; 3) Number of goals scored

=== Top Six ===
| Pos | Team | Pld | W | D | L | GF | GA | GD | Pts | Qualification or relegation |
|---|---|---|---|---|---|---|---|---|---|---|
| 1 | Celtic (C) | 32 | 26 | 4 | 2 | 126 | 18 | +108 | 82 | Qualification for the Champions League first round |
| 2 | Rangers | 32 | 26 | 4 | 2 | 113 | 18 | +95 | 82 | Qualification for the Champions League first round |
| 3 | Glasgow City | 32 | 23 | 4 | 5 | 89 | 25 | +64 | 73 | |
| 4 | Heart of Midlothian | 32 | 17 | 3 | 12 | 68 | 41 | +27 | 54 | |
| 5 | Hibernian | 32 | 14 | 4 | 14 | 71 | 47 | +24 | 46 | |
| 6 | Partick Thistle | 32 | 13 | 2 | 17 | 42 | 66 | −24 | 41 | |

Updated to match(es) played on 19 May 2024. Source:
Rules for classification: 1) Points; 2) Goal difference; 3) Number of goals scored
(C) Champions

== Transfers ==
=== In ===
| Date | Pos | Player | From | Type | Window | Fee |
|---|---|---|---|---|---|---|
| 20 June 2023 | MF | (Scotland) Jenny Smith | (Scotland) Hearts | Transfer | Summer | Free |
| 29 June 2023 | MF | (Scotland) Colette Cavanagh | (Scotland) Rangers | Transfer | Summer | Free |
| 5 July 2023 | MF | (Morocco) Nour Imane Addi | (United States) South Alabama Jaguars | Transfer | Summer | Free |
| 7 July 2023 | DF | (Argentina) Luana Muñoz | (Argentina) Racing Club | Transfer | Summer | Free |
| 25 July 2023 | MF | (Spain) Paula Partido | (Spain) Real Madrid | Loan | Summer | N/A |
| 26 July 2023 | DF | (France) Celya Barclais | (France) Stade de Reims | Transfer | Summer | Free |
| 26 July 2023 | FW | (United States) Murphy Agnew | (Australia) Newcastle Jets | Transfer | Summer | Free |
| 23 August 2023 | GK | (United States) Kelsey Daugherty | (Norway) Avaldsnes IL | Transfer | Summer | Free |
| 27 September 2023 | DF | (Guyana) Sydney Cummings | (United States) San Diego Wave | Transfer | Summer | Free |
| 18 January 2024 | GK | (Scotland) Lisa Rodgers | (Scotland) Hearts | Transfer | Winter | Free |
| 24 January 2024 | FW | (England) Natasha Flint | (England) Liverpool | Loan | Winter | N/A |

=== Out ===
| Date | Pos | Player | To | Type | Window | Fee |
|---|---|---|---|---|---|---|
| 15 June 2023 | MF | (Scotland) Abbie Ferguson | (Scotland) Hibernian | Transfer | Summer | Free |
| 16 June 2023 | MF | (Scotland) Tegan Bowie | (Scotland) Hibernian | Transfer | Summer | Free |
| 22 June 2023 | GK | (Mexico) Pamela Tajonar | (Mexico) Monterrey | Transfer | Summer | N/A |
| 29 June 2023 | MF | (Scotland) Leigha Dobbins | (United States) Arizona Western College | Transfer | Summer | Free |
| 1 July 2023 | DF | (United States) Taylor Otto | (United States) Gotham FC | Transfer | Summer | Free |
| 1 July 2023 | FW | (England) Natasha Flint | (England) Leicester City | Loan Ended | Summer | N/A |
| 2 July 2023 | MF | (Australia) Jacynta | (Portugal) Sporting CP | Transfer | Summer | Free |
| 5 July 2023 | MF | (Scotland) Olivia Potter | (United States) Old Dominion University | Transfer | Summer | Free |
| 8 July 2023 | FW | (England) Olivia Fergusson | (England) Wolves | Transfer | Summer | Free |
| 14 July 2023 | DF | (Republic of Ireland) Claire O'Riordan | (Belgium) Standard Liege | Transfer | Summer | Free |
| 23 August 2023 | MF | (New Zealand) Olivia Chance | Free Transfer | Released | Summer | Free |
| 7 October 2023 | GK | (Scotland) India Marwaha | (Scotland) Hamilton Academical | Transfer | Summer | Free |
| 18 January 2024 | GK | (Scotland) Rachael Johnstone | (Scotland) Hearts | Transfer | Winter | Free |
