= 2022–23 Celtic F.C. Women season =

Football season for Celtic F.C. Women

Celtic F.C.
2022–23 season
- Manager: Fran Alonso
- Stadium: Excelsior Stadium, Airdrie
- SWPL 1: 2nd
- Scottish Cup: Winners
- SWPL Cup: Quarter-finals
- Top goalscorer: League: Amy Gallacher (17 goals); All: Amy Gallacher (20 goals)
Home colours	Away colours	Third colours

The 2022–23 season was Celtic Women's 16th season of competitive football.

== Pre-season and friendlies ==
Celtic held a pre-season training camp in Puerto de Mogán in Gran Canaria before returning to play in the inaugural women's Glasgow Cup.

24 July 2022 Glasgow Cup final	Celtic	1-2	Rangers	Airdrie
	Larisey 41'	Report	Kerr 31'; Clark 54' (o.g.)	Stadium: Excelsior Stadium

== Scottish Women's Premier League ==
In a close three-team title decider on the final day of the season, Celtic were denied their first league title due to a 92nd-minute winner for Glasgow City against the other team in the battle for the league, Rangers. Celtic also played in front of a record crowd for a domestic match of 9553 when the defeated Glasgow City 3-1 at Celtic Park.

7 August 2022	Celtic	9–0	Hibernian	Airdrie
	Jacynta 1', 41', 43'; Notley 13' (o.g.); Larisey 26', 36', 72'; Gallacher 85', 88' (pen.)	Report	Hunter (red card) 86'	Stadium: Excelsior Stadium

14 August 2022	Partick Thistle	0-2	Celtic	Glasgow
		Report	Ashworth-Clifford 23'; Craig 54' (pen.)	Stadium: Petershill Park

21 August 2022	Celtic	4-0	Spartans	Airdrie
	Otto 23'; Craig 34' (pen.); Larisey 46', 87' (pen.)	Report		Stadium: Excelsior Stadium

28 August 2022	Motherwell	0-8	Celtic	East Kilbride
		Report	Hayes 27', 45'; Larisey 29', 36'; Craig 61'; Jacynta 72', 88'; Ashworth-Clifford 89'	Stadium: K-Park Training Academy

18 September 2022	Celtic	6-0	Hamilton Academical	Airdrie
	Jacynta 2', 47'; Larisey 17'; Shen Mengyu 26'; Craig 28'; Fergusson 68'	Report		Stadium: Excelsior Stadium

25 September 2022	Aberdeen	0-3	Celtic	Cove Bay, Aberdeen
		Report	Larisey 29'; Jacynta 75'; Ashworth-Clifford 76'	Stadium: Balmoral Stadium

16 October 2022	Celtic	7-0	Glasgow Women	Airdrie
	Ashworth-Clifford 38', 43'; Otto 46'; Hayes 58'; Jacynta 67'; Larisey 79'	Report		Stadium: Excelsior Stadium

19 October 2022	Dundee United	0-4	Celtic	Dundee
		Report	Jacynta 5'; Larisey 7'; Hayes 69'; Bowie 81'	Stadium: Gussie Park

30 October 2022	Glasgow City	2-1	Celtic	Glasgow
	Davidson 51' (pen.); Lauder 90'	Report	Shen Mengyu 76'	Stadium: Petershill Park

20 November 2022	Celtic	3-0	Hearts	Airdrie
	Gallacher 16', 84'; Fergusson 43'	Report		Stadium: Excelsior Stadium

26 November 2022	Rangers	0-0	Celtic	Cumbernauld
		Report		Stadium: Broadwood Stadium

4 December 2022	Celtic	7-0	Dundee United	Airdrie
	Larisey 3'; Shen Mengyu 20', 57', 90'; Gallacher 24'; McAneny 73'; Burchill 81'	Report		Stadium: Excelsior Stadium

15 January 2023	Glasgow Women	0-8	Celtic	Glasgow
		Report	Ross 26'; Gallacher 40', 45+1', 45+4', 51'; Hayes 60'; Jacynta 71'; McAneny 85'	Stadium: New Tinto Park

18 January 2023	Celtic	0-0	Motherwell	Airdrie
		Report		Stadium: Excelsior Stadium

22 January 2023	Celtic	8-0	Partick Thistle	Airdrie
	Ross 14'; Gallacher 16', 36'; Shen Mengyu 50'; Craig 65', 76' (pen.); Jacynta 72'; Clark 81'	Report		Stadium: Excelsior Stadium

29 January 2023	Hearts	1-2	Celtic	Edinburgh
	Smith 50'	Report	Jacynta 29'; Shen Mengyu 31'	Stadium: Oriam

5 February 2023	Celtic	3-0	Aberdeen	Airdrie
	Craig 45+1'; O'Riordan 63'; Ross 71'	Report		Stadium: Excelsior Stadium

8 February 2023	Spartans	0-3	Celtic	Edinburgh
		Report	Jacynta 49'; Fergusson 64'; Marshall 65' (o.g.)	Stadium: Ainslie Park

24 February 2023	Celtic	3-0	Rangers	Airdrie
	Hayes 14', 49'; Gallacher 46'	Report		Stadium: Excelsior Stadium

1 March 2023	Hamilton Academical	0-7	Celtic	Hamilton
		Report	Flint 15', 58' (pen.); Ross 23'; Shen Mengyu 42', 60'; Nicolson 74' (o.g.); Chance 78'	Stadium: New Douglas Park

5 March 2023	Celtic	0-1	Glasgow City	Airdrie
		Report	Priscila Chinchilla 65'	Stadium: Excelsior Stadium

12 March 2023	Hibernian	0-2	Celtic	Edinburgh
		Report	Gallacher 9'; Hayes 35'	Stadium: Meadowbank Stadium

27 March 2023	Rangers	1-1	Celtic	Cumbernauld
	Hay 36'	Report	Hayes 90+9'	Stadium: Broadwood Stadium

2 April 2023	Celtic	2-0	Partick Thistle	Airdrie
	Gallacher 38'; Slater 71' (o.g.)	Report		Stadium: Excelsior Stadium

16 April 2023	Glasgow City	2-4	Celtic	Glasgow
	Priscila Chinchilla 52'; Lauder 68'	Report	Ross 16'; Flint 32', 63'; Hayes 56'	Stadium: Petershill Park

19 April 2023	Hearts	0-6	Celtic	Edinburgh
		Report	Jacynta 10'; Craig 25'; Flint 33'; Gallacher 72', 74'; Loferski 90+3'	Stadium: Oriam

30 April 2023	Celtic	3-0	Hibernian	Airdrie
	Gallacher 19'; Craig 40'; Flint 46'	Report		Stadium: Excelsior Stadium

4 May 2023	Celtic	0-1	Rangers	Airdrie
		Report	Howat 66'	Stadium: Excelsior Stadium

7 May 2023	Partick Thistle	1-2	Celtic	Glasgow
	Henderson 57'	Report	Hayes 30', 90+5'	Stadium: Petershill Park

11 May 2023	Celtic	3-1	Glasgow City	Glasgow
	Flint 60'; O'Riordan 76'; Loferski 83'	Report	Lauren Davidson 20'	Stadium: Celtic Park

14 May 2023	Hibernian	1-2	Celtic	Edinburgh
	Mustafa 90+5'	Report	Loferski 16'; O'Riordan 34'	Stadium: Meadowbank Stadium

21 May 2023	Celtic	2-0	Hearts	Glasgow
	Hayes 43'; Flint 68'	Report		Stadium: Celtic Park

== Scottish Women's Cup ==
On 6 December, Celtic were drawn to face Falkirk in the fourth round of the 2022-23 Scottish Women’s Cup, On 9 January 2023, Celtic were drawn to face Boroughmuir Thistle in the fifth round. On 13 February, Celtic were drawn to face Heart of Midlothian in the quarter-finals. On 19 March, Celtic were drawn to face Glasgow City in the semi-finals. Celtic faced Rangers in the final on 28 May.

8 January 2023 4th Round	Falkirk	0-9	Celtic	Falkirk
14:00		Report	Ross 5'; Gallacher 22', 38', 89'; O'Riordan 25', 32'; Menglu 56'; Hayes 68'; McAneny 82'	Stadium: Falkirk Stadium

12 February 2023 5th round	Boroughmuir Thistle	0-5	Celtic	Edinburgh
12:00		Report	Bowie 1'; Craig 18', 64'; McAneny 32'; Fergusson 86'	Stadium: Meadowbank Stadium

19 March 2023 Quarter-final	Hearts	1-5	Celtic	Edinburgh
15:00	Forsyth 15'	Report	Kerner 54'; O'Riordan 57'; Menglu 78'; Craig 86'; Flint 90+1'	Stadium: Oriam

23 April 2023 Semi-final	Glasgow City	0-1	Celtic	Glasgow
12:30		Report	Flint 90+1'	Stadium: Hampden Park

28 May 2023 Final	Celtic	2-0	Rangers	Glasgow
13:30	Flint 64'; O'Riordan 67'	Report		Stadium: Hampden Park

== Scottish Women's Premier League Cup ==
On 20 September 2022, Celtic were drawn to face Partick Thistle in the Second round of the 2022-23 SWPL Cup, On 4 October 2022, Celtic were drawn to face Boroughmuir Thistle in the fifth round. On 13 February, Celtic were drawn to face Spartans in the quarter-finals.

2 October 2022 Second round	Partick Thistle	0-2	Celtic	Glasgow
12:45		Report	Ashworth-Clifford 14'; Jacynta 26'	Stadium: Petershill Park

23 October 2022 Quarter-final	Celtic	1-1 (2-4 p)	Spartans	Airdrie
14:00	Larisey 12'	Report	Mason 90+2'	Stadium: Excelsior Stadium
	Penalties
	Robertson (penalty missed); Clark (penalty scored); Craig (penalty scored); Bowie (penalty missed)		(penalty scored) Clelland; (penalty scored) Birse; (penalty scored) McQuillan; (penalty scored) McCafferty

== Players ==
As of 28 March 2026

Note: Flags indicate national team as defined under FIFA eligibility rules; some limited exceptions apply. Players may hold more than one non-FIFA nationality.

No.	Pos.	Nation	Player
1	GK	SCO	Chloe Logan
2	DF	USA	Taylor Otto
3	DF	IRL	Claire O'Riordan
4	MF	SCO	Lisa Robertson
5	MF	SCO	Natalie Ross
6	DF	SCO	Chloe Craig
7	FW	SCO	Amy Gallacher
8	MF	AUS	Jacynta Galabadaarachchi
9	MF	CHN	Shen Mengyu
10	MF	CAN	Clarissa Larisey
11	MF	NZL	Olivia Chance
15	DF	SCO	Kelly Clark (captain)
16	DF	USA	Hana Kerner
17	GK	MEX	Pamela Tajonar

No.	Pos.	Nation	Player
18	DF	IRL	Caitlin Hayes
19	FW	ENG	Olivia Fergusson
21	FW	USA	Kit Loferski
22	MF	ENG	Lucy Ashworth-Clifford
24	MF	SCO	Tegan Bowie
26	FW	ENG	Natasha Flint
27	FW	SCO	Tiree Burchill
28	MF	CHN	Shen Menglu
41	MF	SCO	Clare Goldie
42	MF	SCO	Leigha Dobbins
43	MF	SCO	Lucy Barclay
52	GK	SCO	Rachael Johnstone
73	MF	SCO	Maria McAneny

== Player Statistics ==
=== Appearances and Goals ===
List of player appearances, substitute appearances in brackets, goals for each competition including totals

Celtic FC Women – 2022–23 Player Statistics by Competition
Player	Position	SWPL 1		Scottish Cup		League Cup		Total Apps	Total Goals
		Apps	Goals	Apps	Goals	Apps	Goals	Apps	Goals
Chloe Logan	GK	1	0	0	0	0	0	1	0
Rachael Johnstone	GK	1	0	0	0	0	0	1	0
Pamela Tajonar	GK	30	0	5	0	2	0	37	0
Taylor Otto	DF	17(9)	2	3(2)	0	1(1)	0	21(12)	4
Claire O'Riordan	DF	22(6)	3	4(1)	4	2	0	28(7)	7
Chloe Craig	DF	15(7)	9	2(3)	3	2	0	19(10)	12
Kelly Clark	DF	26(3)	1	4(1)	0	2	0	32(4)	1
Caitlin Hayes	DF	28(2)	13	5	1	1(1)	0	34(3)	14
Hana Kerner	DF	9(2)	0	2(1)	1	0	0	11(3)	1
Tegan Bowie	MF	7(19)	1	1(2)	1	0(2)	0	8(23)	2
Shen Mengyu	MF	22(6)	5	2(1)	0	0(1)	0	24(8)	5
Lisa Robertson	MF	21(1)	0	3(1)	0	2	0	26(2)	0
Natalie Ross	MF	17(10)	6	3(1)	1	2	0	22(11)	7
Shen Menglu	MF	18(9)	4	3(2)	2	1(1)	0	22(12)	6
Olivia Chance	MF	15(4)	1	2	0	1(1)	0	18(5)	1
Jacynta	MF	25(5)	15	4	0	2	1	31(5)	16
Clare Goldie	MF	1(6)	0	0(2)	0	0	0	1(8)	0
Maria McAneny	MF	5(13)	2	0(2)	2	0	0	7(15)	4
Lucy Ashworth-Clifford	MF	11	5	0	0	2	1	13	6
Lucy Barclay	MF	0(1)	0	0	0	0	0	0(1)	0
Leigha Dobbins	MF	0(1)	0	0	0	0	0	0(1)	0
Amy Gallacher	FW	23(4)	17	5	3	1	0	29(4)	20
Clarissa Larisey	FW	11(1)	12	0	0	1(1)	1	12(2)	13
Natasha Flint	FW	12(2)	8	3(1)	3	0	0	15(3)	11
Tiree Burchill	FW	4(7)	1	0	0	0	0	4(7)	1
Olivia Fergusson	FW	5(21)	3	2(3)	1	0(2)	0	7(26)	4
Kit Loferski	FW	5(5)	3	0(2)	0	0	0	5(7)	3

=== Goalscorers ===
R	No.	Pos.	Nation	Name	Premiership	Scottish Cup	League Cup	Total
1	7	FW	(Scotland)	Amy Gallacher	17	3	0	20
2	8	MF	(Australia)	Jacynta	15	0	1	16
3	18	DF	(Republic of Ireland)	Caitlin Hayes	13	1	0	14
4	10	FW	(Canada)	Clarissa Larisey	12	0	1	13
5	6	DF	(Scotland)	Chloe Craig	9	3	0	12
6	26	FW	(England)	Natasha Flint	8	3	0	11
7	5	MF	(Scotland)	Natalie Ross	6	1	0	7
7	3	DF	(Republic of Ireland)	Claire O'Riordan	3	4	0	7
9	22	MF	(England)	Lucy Ashworth-Clifford	5	0	1	6
9	28	MF	(China)	Shen Menglu	4	2	0	6
11	9	MF	(China)	Shen Mengyu	5	0	0	5
12	22	FW	(England)	Olivia Fergusson	3	1	0	4
12	73	MF	(Scotland)	Maria McAneny	2	2	0	4
14	21	FW	(United States)	Kit Loferski	3	0	0	3
15	2	DF	(United States)	Taylor Otto	2	0	0	2
15	24	MF	(Scotland)	Tegan Bowie	1	1	0	2
17	15	DF	(Scotland)	Kelly Clark	1	0	0	1
17	11	MF	(New Zealand)	Olivia Chance	1	0	0	1
17	27	FW	(Scotland)	Tiree Burchill	1	0	0	1
17	16	DF	(United States)	Hana Kerner	0	1	0	1
Own goals					4	0	0	4
Total					115	22	3	140

Last updated: 28 March 2026

=== Hat-tricks ===
Player	Against	Result	Date	Competition
(Scotland) Amy Gallacher	(Scotland) Falkirk	9-0 (A)	8 January 2023	Scottish Cup
(Scotland) Amy Gallacher	(Scotland) Glasgow Women	8-0 (A)	15 January 2023	League
(Australia) Jacynta	(Scotland) Hibernian	9-0 (H)	7 August 2022	League
(Canada) Clarissa Larisey	(Scotland) Hibernian	9-0 (H)	7 August 2022	League
(China) Shen Mengyu	(Scotland) Dundee Utd	7-0 (H)	4 December 2022	League

(H) – Home; (A) – Away; (N) – Neutral

=== Clean sheets ===
As of 28 March 2026.

Rank	Name	Premiership	Scottish Cup	League Cup	Total	Played Games
1	(Mexico) Pamela Tajonar	22	4	1	27	37
2	(Scotland) Rachael Johnstone	1	0	0	1	1
3	(Scotland) Chloe Logan	0	0	0	0	1
Total		23	4	1	28	39

== Team statistics ==
=== League Tables ===
==== Regular season ====
Pos	Team	Pld	W	D	L	GF	GA	GD	Pts	Qualification or relegation
1	Glasgow City	22	20	2	0	94	7	+87	62	Qualification for the Top six
2	Celtic	22	18	2	2	90	4	+86	56	Qualification for the Top six
3	Rangers	22	17	4	1	89	5	+84	55	Qualification for the Top six
4	Heart of Midlothian	22	12	4	6	33	19	+14	40	Qualification for the Top six
5	Hibernian	22	9	5	8	45	34	+11	32	Qualification for the Top six
6	Partick Thistle	22	9	4	9	37	50	−13	31	Qualification for the Top six
7	Motherwell	22	8	6	8	28	39	−11	30	Qualification for the Bottom six
8	Spartans	22	7	5	10	19	38	−19	26	Qualification for the Bottom six
9	Dundee United	22	5	2	15	21	61	−40	17	Qualification for the Bottom six
10	Aberdeen	22	4	3	15	20	56	−36	15	Qualification for the Bottom six
11	Hamilton Academical	22	4	1	17	20	74	−54	13	Qualification for the Bottom six
12	Glasgow Women	22	0	0	22	6	115	−109	0	Qualification for the Bottom six

Rules for classification: 1) Points; 2) Goal difference; 3) Number of goals scored

==== Top six ====
Pos	Team	Pld	W	D	L	GF	GA	GD	Pts	Qualification or relegation
1	Glasgow City (C)	32	27	2	3	112	18	+94	83	Qualification for the Champions League first round
2	Celtic	32	26	3	3	115	11	+104	81	Qualification for the Champions League first round
3	Rangers	32	24	6	2	111	9	+102	78	
4	Heart of Midlothian	32	14	7	11	39	42	−3	49	
5	Hibernian	32	11	6	15	54	51	+3	39	
6	Partick Thistle	32	9	5	18	42	73	−31	32	

Rules for classification: 1) Points; 2) Goal difference; 3) Number of goals scored
(C) Champions
