= 2022–23 Women's Scottish Cup =

2022–23 Scottish Women's Cup
Tournament details
- Country: Scotland
- Dates: 9 September 2022 – 28 May 2023

Final positions
- Champions: Celtic
- Runners-up: Rangers

The 2022–23 Scottish Cup was the 50th official edition (52nd overall) of the national cup competition in Scottish women's football.

== Results ==
All results listed are published by Scottish Football Association (SFA).

=== Preliminary round ===
The draw for the preliminary round took place on Friday 2 September 2022 at Hampden Park. Alloa Athletic, Bonnyrigg Rose, Buchan Ladies United, Clydebank, Dunipace, Linlithgow Rose, Queen of the South, Stewarton United, Stonehaven and West Park United received a bye to the first round. The preliminary-round games which were due to take place on Sunday 11 September 2022 were postponed by the SFA due to the death of Elizabeth II.

Brora Rangers, Orkney and Nithsdale Wanderers forfeited the games and Clachnacuddin, Harmony Row and Central Girls progressed to the first round.

22 September 2022	Drumchapel United	6–0	Nairn Saint Ninian	Glasgow
14:00				Stadium: Donald Dewar Centre

22 September 2022	Dunfermline Athletic	7–0	Clark Drive	Dunfermline
15:00				Stadium: Pitreavie Sport And Soccer Centre

22 September 2022	Murieston United	3–3 (2–4 p)	McDermid Ladies	Livingston
14:00				Stadium: Bankton Mains Sports Complex

22 September 2022	Clachnacuddin	3–0 (awarded)	Brora Rangers	Inverness
14:30				Stadium: Clach Park

22 September 2022	Harmony Row	3–0 (awarded)	Orkney	Braehead
14:30				Stadium: Sir Alex Ferguson Park

22 September 2022	Nithsdale Wanderers	0–3 (awarded)	Central Girls	Sanquhar
14:30				Stadium: Lorimer Park

=== First round ===
The draw for the first round took place on Thursday 15 September 2022.

2 October 2022	Drumchapel United	0–3	Dunfermline Athletic	Glasgow
14:30			Davie 2'; Sibbons	Stadium: Donald Dewar Centre

2 October 2022	Queen of the South	2–1	West Park United	Dumfries
14:00	Smith; Ovens			Stadium: North West Community Campus

2 October 2022	Clydebank	2–6	Linlithgow Rose	Clydebank
12:00				Stadium: Holm Park

2 October 2022	Clachnacuddin	9–3	Buchan United	Inverness
12:00				Stadium: Clach Park

2 October 2022	Stonehaven	6–3	Dunipace	Stonehaven
14:30				Stadium: Mineralwell Park

2 October 2022	Bonnyrigg Rose	8–2	Stewarton United	Bonnyrigg
13:30				Stadium: Poltonhall Sports Complex

2 October 2022	Alloa Athletic	0–5	Harmony Row	Alloa
16:00				Stadium: Recreation Park

2 October 2022	McDermid Ladies	2–2	Central Girls	Kirkcaldy
14:00				Stadium: Windmill Community Campus

=== Second round ===
The draw for the second round took place on Wednesday 12 October 2022.

6 November 2022	Central Girls	4–1	Stonehaven	Polmont
14:00				Stadium: Little Kerse Playing Fields

6 November 2022	Dunfermline Athletic	1–5	Bonnyrigg Rose	Dunfermline
12:30				Stadium: Pitreavie Playing Fields

6 November 2022	Queen of the South	7–0	Buchan United	Dumfries
14:00				Stadium: Palmerston Park

6 November 2022	Linlithgow Rose	2–0	Harmony Row	Linlithgow
16:00				Stadium: Xcite Linlithgow

=== Third round ===
The draw for the third round took place on Wednesday 12 October 2022 at Hampden Park.

4 December 2022	Airdrie Ladies	2–3	Greenock Morton	Edinburgh
14:00				Stadium: Saughton Sports Complex

4 December 2022	Ayr United	5–2	Renfrew	Cumnock
16:00				Stadium: Townhead Park

4 December 2022	Bonnyrigg Rose	3–1	Queen of the South	Bonnyrigg
13:30				Stadium: Poltonhall Sports Complex

4 December 2022	BSC Glasgow	1–5	Dryburgh Athletic	Glasgow
13:30				Stadium: Peterson Park Football Centre

Edinburgh Caledonia	w/o	Gleniffer Thistle

4 December 2022	Giffnock SC Women	3–5	Falkirk	Giffnock
13:00				Stadium: Eastwood Park

4 December 2022	Grampian	7–2	Dundee West	Aberdeen
16:00				Stadium: Spain Park

4 December 2022	Hutchison Vale	2–1 (a.e.t.)	Edinburgh City	Edinburgh
14:00	Evans; Naysmith		Wilkinson	Stadium: Saughton Sports Complex

4 December 2022	Inverness Caledonian Thistle	2–1	Livingston	Inverness
12:30				Stadium: Millburn Academy

4 December 2022	St Mirren	2–4	Rossvale	Paisley
15:30				Stadium: Mossedge Village

4 December 2022	Stenhousemuir	2–2 (a.e.t.) (4–5 p)	Central Girls	Stenhousemuir
14:30				Stadium: Ochilview Park

4 December 2022	Westdyke	6–1	Linlithgow Rose	Westhill
14:45				Stadium: Lawsondale Pitches

=== Fourth round ===
The draw for the fourth round took place on Tuesday 6 December 2022 at Meggetland Sports Complex in Edinburgh.

8 January 2023	Queen's Park	2–5	Partick Thistle	Glasgow
18.00	Callaghan 44'; McKee 84'		Ferguson 16'; Henderson 38'; Robinson 43', 90'; Donaldson 85'	Stadium: New Tinto Park

8 January 2023	Rangers	11–0	Stirling University	Cumbernauld
15:00	Howat 5', 38'; McLeary 13', 30', 64'; Bell 22'; Arnot 33'; Hay 53'; Watson 70'; Danielsson 82', 88'			Stadium: Broadwood Stadium

8 January 2023	Aberdeen	2–0	Hutchison Vale	Aberdeen
14:00	Hutchison 35'; Christie 70'			Stadium: Balmoral Stadium

8 January 2023	Falkirk	0–9	Celtic	Falkirk
14:00			Ross 5'; Gallacher 22', 38', 89'; O'Riordan 25', 32'; Menglu 56'; Hayes 68'; McAneny 82'	Stadium: Falkirk Stadium

8 January 2023	Dundee United	0–2	Heart of Midlothian	Dundee
14:30			Grant 52'; Penman 55'	Stadium: Gussie Park

8 January 2023	Grampian	2–6	East Fife	Aberdeen
14:00			Rigby-Wilson; Thomson; (o.g.); Knight 2'; Lumsden	Stadium: Spain Park

8 January 2023	Central Girls	1–3	Rossvale	Grangemouth
14:00				Stadium: Inchyra Park

8 January 2023	Hibernian	3–0	Spartans	Edinburgh
14:00	Morrison 35'; Adams 53'; Kuyken 69'			Stadium: Meadowbank Stadium

8 January 2023	Glasgow Women	5–1	Inverness Caledonian Thistle	Glasgow
14:00	Cunningham 22', 90'; Honeyman 42'; Boyes 65'; Campbell 78'		77'	Stadium: Alliance Park

8 January 2023	Glasgow City	4–0	Hamilton Academical	Glasgow
14:00	Prades 7'; Greening 16'; Lauder 36'; Kozak 64'			Stadium: Petershill Park

8 January 2023	Ayr United	4–4 (a.e.t.) (5–4 p)	Greenock Morton	Ayr
14:00	Docherty 4'; Cameron		Seagrave 32'; Bell 52'; Rankin 77'; Darroch 98'	Stadium: Queen Margaret Academy
	Penalties
	Dick (penalty scored); Nicol (penalty scored); McBlain (penalty scored); Docherty (penalty scored); Whiteside (penalty scored)		Penalty scored Penalty missed

8 January 2023	Dryburgh Athletic	0–2	St Johnstone	Forfar
14:00			Newbigging 78'; Simson 80'	Stadium: Station Park

8 January 2023	Motherwell	3–0	Gartcairn	East Kilbride
14:00	McDonald-Nguah 29'; Rice 86'; Boyce 88'			Stadium: K-Park

8 January 2023	Westdyke	0–1 (a.e.t.)	Kilmarnock	Westhill
14:00			Harty 97'	Stadium: Lawsondale Playing Fields

8 January 2023	Montrose	12–0	Bonnyrigg Rose	Montrose
14:00	Gordon 8', 49', 64', 80'; Brown 9'; Culley 13'; Gammie 14', 44', 60'; Burns 31'; Ridgeway 88', 89'			Stadium: Links Park

8 January 2023	Boroughmuir Thistle	11–1	Edinburgh Caledonia	Edinburgh
14:00	Davie 10', 46'; Hinchcliffe (?), 37'; Smith 49', 51', 53' (?); Orr-Love; Begg		Macrae 75'	Stadium: Meadowbank

=== Fifth round ===
The draw for the fifth round took place on Tuesday 9 January 2023 at Hampden Park in Glasgow.

12 February 2023	Ayr United	0–2	Glasgow Women	Cumnock
18:00			Barghati 63'; Honeyman 77'	Stadium: Townhead Park

12 February 2023	Boroughmuir Thistle	0–5	Celtic	Edinburgh
12:00			Bowie 1'; Craig 18', 64'; McAneny 32'; Fergusson 86'	Stadium: Meadowbank Stadium

12 February 2023	Glasgow City	5–0	Aberdeen	Glasgow
18:00	Chinchilla 6'; Fulton 47', 64'; Porter 74'; Martin 78'			Stadium: Petershill Park

12 February 2023	Hibernian	4–0	East Fife	Edinburgh
18:00	Adams 45+4'; Tweedie 46'; Morrison 77'; Lockwood 84'			Stadium: Meadowbank Stadium

12 February 2023	Kilmarnock	1–0	St Johnstone	Kilmarnock
18:00	Swanson 16'			Stadium: Rugby Park

12 February 2023	Motherwell	4–0	Montrose	East Kilbride
18:00	Addie 18'; Burchill 50'; McDonald-Nguah 65'; Jardine 90'			Stadium: K-Park

12 February 2023	Partick Thistle	1–4 (a.e.t.)	Heart of Midlothian	Glasgow
18:00	Docherty 60'		Timms 37'; Rood 101'; Michie 103'; Grant 120'	Stadium: Petershill Park

12 February 2023	Rossvale	0–13	Rangers	Glasgow
11:00			Arnot 5', 61', 66'; McLeary 11'; MacLean 17'; Danielsson 22', 35'; Cavanagh 29'; Howat 52'; Middag 59'; Nolf 64', 88'; Cornet 73'	Stadium: Petershill Park

=== Quarter-finals ===
The draw for the quarter-finals took place on Tuesday 13 February 2023 at Hampden Park in Glasgow.

19 March 2023	Glasgow Women	0–4	Motherwell	Coatbridge
14:00			Boyce 5', 50', 87'; Doran-Barr 65'	Stadium: Cliftonhill Stadium

19 March 2023	Heart of Midlothian	1–5	Celtic	Edinburgh
15:00	Forsyth 11'		Kerner 54'; O’Riordan 57'; Menglu 78'; Craig 86'; Flint 90+1'	Stadium: Oriam

19 March 2023	Rangers	6–0	Hibernian	Cumbernauld
16:00	Arnot 15'; McLauchlan 30'; Kerr 31'; Hay 34'; Hill 52'; Watson 79'			Stadium: Broadwood Stadium

19 March 2023	Kilmarnock	0–3	Glasgow City	Kilmarnock
16:00			Kozak 15'; Clark 30'; McCulloch 72' (o.g.)	Stadium: Rugby Park

=== Semi-finals ===
The draw for the semi-finals took place on Sunday 19 March 2023 at Hampden Park in Glasgow.

22 April 2023	Rangers	2–0	Motherwell	Glasgow
12:30	Davison 17'; Cornet 88'			Stadium: Hampden Park

23 April 2023	Glasgow City	0–1	Celtic	Glasgow
12:30			Flint 19'	Stadium: Hampden Park

== Final ==
The final was the first to be played at the national stadium Hampden Park and the first to be played between Celtic and Rangers, the pre-eminent rivalry in Scottish men's football known as the Old Firm derby. The popularity of the clubs led to increased interest in this match, with the attendance of over 10,000 far exceeding what had come to be the expected crowd figure of between 3-4,000 for women's cup finals in Scotland.

Celtic were the defending champions, having won the competition for the first time in 2022. Rangers were making their third appearance and looking for their maiden victory; they reached the final without conceding a goal in four rounds. They had already won the 2022–23 Scottish Women's Premier League Cup (for the first time) earlier in the season. With both teams having suffered the disappointment of missing out on the 2022–23 Scottish Women's Premier League title on the last matchday a week earlier, they were considered evenly matched going into the final. Celtic came out on top and retained the trophy with two goals in the second half from Natasha Flint and Claire O'Riordan, both originating from corners.

28 May 2023
13:30

Celtic	2–0	Rangers
Flint 64'; O'Riordan 67'

Hampden Park, Glasgow
Attendance: 10,446
Referee: David Munro

Celtic	Rangers

17	(Mexico) Pamela Tajonar
3	(Republic of Ireland) Claire O'Riordan
6	(Scotland) Chloe Craig
7	(Scotland) Amy Gallacher	(substituted off) 73'
8	(Australia) Jacynta Galabadaarachchi	(substituted off) 88'
9	(China) Shen Mengyu
15	(Scotland) Kelly Clark (c)
18	(England) Caitlin Hayes
26	(England) Natasha Flint	(substituted off) 88'
28	(China) Shen Menglu	(substituted off) 88'
73	(Scotland) Maria McAneny	(substituted off) 56'
Substitutes:
1	(Scotland) Chloe Logan
2	(United States) Taylor Otto	(substituted on) 73'
19	(England) Olivia Fergusson	(substituted on) 88'
21	(United States) Kit Loferski	(substituted on) 56'
24	(Scotland) Tegan Bowie	(substituted on) 88'
40	(Scotland) Abbie Cusack
41	(Scotland) Amy Sharkey
43	(Scotland) Lucy Barclay
46	(Scotland) Clare Goldie	(substituted on) 88'
Manager:
(Spain) Fran Alonso

22	(New Zealand) Victoria Esson
3	(Scotland) Rachel McLauchlan
4	(Scotland) Kathryn Hill (c)
5	(United States) Hannah Davison
6	(Netherlands) Tessel Middag	(substituted off) 73'
7	(Scotland) Brogan Hay	(substituted off) 70'
9	(Scotland) Kirsty Howat	(substituted off) 85'
18	(Scotland) Chelsea Cornet
23	(Scotland) Kirsty Maclean
27	(United States) Maddie Nolf
28	(Scotland) Emma Watson	(substituted off) 70'
Substitutes:
1	(Scotland) Jenna Fife
2	(Scotland) Nicola Docherty
11	(Northern Ireland) Megan Bell	(substituted on) 85'
14	(Scotland) Colette Cavanagh
15	(Scotland) Lizzie Arnot	(substituted on) 70'
24	(Scotland) Sam Kerr
26	(Scotland) Jodi McLeary	(substituted on) 70'
32	(Scotland) Mia McAulay
46	(Scotland) Laura Berry	(substituted on) 73'
Manager:
(Scotland) Malky Thomson
