= 2019 Scottish Women's Premier League Cup =

Tournament details
- Country: Scotland
- Teams: 16

Final positions
- Champions: Hibernian
- Runners-up: Glasgow City

Tournament statistics
- Top goal scorer: Beth McKay (5 goals)

The 2019 Scottish Women's Premier League Cup was the 18th edition of the Scottish Women's Premier League's league cup competition, which began in 2002. It was sponsored by the Scottish Building Society and officially known as the Scottish Building Society Scottish Women's Premier League Cup. The competition was contested by all 16 teams of the two divisions of the Scottish Women's Premier League (SWPL 1 and SWPL 2).

== Results ==
All results listed are published by Scottish Women's Football (SWF).

=== First round ===
The draw for the First round took place on Saturday, 19 January 2019 at Hampden Park. All 8 ties were played on Sunday, 24 February 2019.

24 February 2019	Partick Thistle	0–4	Rangers	Glasgow
12:00			Napier 5'; Boyce 18', 40'; Watson 24'	Stadium: Petershill Park

24 February 2019	Forfar Farmington	2–1	F.C. Kilmarnock	Forfar
13:00	Kilcoyne 51'; McGinley 55'	Forfar Farmington report	Hare 84'	Stadium: Station Park

24 February 2019	Hibernian	1–0	Heart of Midlothian	Edinburgh
13:00	Reilly 38'	Hibernian report Heart of Midlothian report		Stadium: Ainslie Park

24 February 2019	Hutchison Vale	0–13	Motherwell	Edinburgh
15:00		Motherwell report	Rice 1', 29'; Fyfe 12' (pen.), 35' (pen.), 40' (pen.), 65'; Gardner 17', 61', 85'; Russell 48', 70'; McEachran 68', 75'	Stadium: Saughton Enclosure

24 February 2019	Hamilton Academical	0–4	Spartans	Carluke
15:30		Report	Reynolds 55'; Mason 68'; Mackay 81', 85'	Stadium: John Cumming Stadium

24 February 2019	Stirling University	2–1	Glasgow Girls	Stenhousemuir
15:30	Bonner 15'; Callaghan 80'		McEwan 55'	Stadium: Ochilview Park

24 February 2019	St Johnstone	0–9	Glasgow City	Perth
16:00			Lauder 5', 8', 40'; Docherty 24'; Howat 41', 66', 89'; Clark 68'; Kerr 79'	Stadium: McDiarmid Park

24 February 2019	Dundee United	0–7	Celtic	Dundee
16:15		Celtic report	McGovern 9', 29', 75'; Crosbie 41', 81'; Ewens 46'; McLaughlin 80'	Stadium: GA Engineering Arena

=== Quarter-finals ===
The draw for the quarter-finals took place on Wednesday, 27 February 2019 at Hampden Park. All 4 ties were played on Sunday, 24 March 2019.

24 March 2019	Rangers	4–1	Forfar Farmington	Glasgow
11:45	Gemmell 18' (pen.); Coakley 43'; Pullar 48'; Boyce 85'	Rangers report SWF report	McGinley 71'	Stadium: New Tinto Park

24 March 2019	Stirling University	0–6	Hibernian	Stenhousemuir
12:00		Report	Murray; Napier; Hunter; Gallacher; Fish	Stadium: Ochilview Park

24 March 2019	Motherwell	0–5	Spartans	Ravenscraig
14:30		Motherwell report	Johnstone 10', 28'; McKay 13', 16', 22'	Stadium: Ravenscraig Regional Sports Facility

24 March 2019	Glasgow City	4–0	Celtic	Glasgow
13:00	Lauder 24'; Shine 26', 33'; Foley 52'	BBC report		Stadium: Petershill Park

=== Semi-finals ===
14 April 2019	Hibernian	3–0	Spartans	Cumbernauld
12:00	Davidson 17'; Napier 56'; Tweedie 75'	Report		Stadium: Broadwood Stadium

14 April 2019	Glasgow City	5–1	Rangers	Cumbernauld
15:30	Docherty 8', 18'; Howat 26'; Shine 32'; Ross 51'		O'Hara 45'	Stadium: Broadwood Stadium

== Final ==
10 May 2019

Glasgow City	0–0 (a.e.t.)	Hibernian
	SheKicks; Soccerway
Penalties
Ross (penalty scored); Lauder (penalty missed); Shine (penalty missed); Crichton (penalty scored)	2–4	(penalty scored) Hunter; (penalty scored) Small; (penalty scored) McGregor; (penalty scored) Michie

Excelsior Stadium, Airdrie
Attendance: 981

Glasgow City	Hibernian

25	(Scotland) Erin Clachers
4	(Scotland) Hayley Lauder
8	(Scotland) Leanne Crichton
9	(Scotland) Kirsty Howat
10	(Republic of Ireland) Clare Shine
11	(Scotland) Nicola Docherty
12	(Scotland) Jenna Clark
16	(Scotland) Leanne Ross (c)
20	(Scotland) Carly Girasoli
2`	(Scotland) Jordan McLintock	(substituted off) 75'
23	(Scotland) Megan Foley
Substitutes:
29	(Scotland) Lee Alexander
5	(Scotland) Murron Cunningham
6	(Scotland) Jo Love
18	(Scotland) Sam Kerr
19	(Scotland) Joanne Paton
24	(Slovenia) Lara Ivanuša	(substituted on) 75'
32	(Bosnia and Herzegovina) Lidija Kuliš
Manager:
(Scotland) Scott Booth

1	(Scotland) Jenna Fife
3	(Scotland) Jamie-Lee Napier
4	(Scotland) Siobhan Hunter
8	(Scotland) Cailin Michie
11	(Scotland) Colette Cavanagh	(substituted off) 112'
15	(Scotland) Amy Gallacher	(substituted off) 60'
17	(Scotland) Joelle Murray (c)
19	(Scotland) Chelsea Cornet
23	(Scotland) Rachael Small
29	(Scotland) Kirsty Morrison	(substituted off) 95'
32	(Scotland) Kirsten Reilly	(substituted off) 88'
Substitutes:
13	(Scotland) Jeni Currie
2	(Scotland) Claire Williamson	(substituted on) 112'
9	(Scotland) Lia Tweedie	(substituted on) 95'
10	(Scotland) Shannon McGregor	(substituted on) 60'
12	(Scotland) Lauren Davidson
14	(Scotland) Shannon Leishman
16	(Scotland) Ellis Notley	(substituted on) 88'
Manager:
(Scotland) Grant Scott

== Top goalscorers ==
Rank	Player	Club	Goals
1	(Scotland) Beth McKay	Spartans	5
2	(Scotland) Hayley Lauder	Glasgow City	4
2	(Scotland) Kirsty Howat	Glasgow City	4
