= 2019 Scottish Women's Cup =

Tournament details
- Country: Scotland
- Teams: 60

Final positions
- Champions: Glasgow City
- Runners-up: Hibernian

Tournament statistics
- Matches played: 48
- Goals scored: 347 (7.23 per match)
- All statistics correct as of 15 November 2019.

The 2019 SWF Scottish Cup, known as the 2019 SSE Scottish Women's Cup for sponsorship reasons, was the 48th official edition (50th overall) of the national cup competition in Scottish women's football.

== First round ==
Teams in Bold advanced to the second round. The number in brackets indicates the level on the Scottish women's league pyramid each team competes in the 2019 season. H&I indicates a team which plays in the Highlands & Islands League.

Home team	Score	Away team
28 April 2019
**Raith Rovers** (3)	3–2	Rutherglen (4)
Ayr United (3)	1–2	**BSC Glasgow** (4)
**Dunfermline Athletic** (3)	13–0	Stewarton United (4)
**Montrose** (3)	5–4	Renfrew (3)
Morton (4)	0–4	**Aberdeen** (3)
**Bishopton** (4)	9–2	Granite City (4)
**Borders** (4)	5–0	Mid Annandale (4)
**Airdrie** (4)	5–2	Murieston United (4)
East Kilbride Thistle (4)	w/o	**Edinburgh Caledonia** (4)
**Stonehaven** (3)	3–0 (Awarded)	Annan Athletic (4)

== Second round ==
Teams in Bold advanced to the third round.

Home team	Score	Away team
2 June 2019
**Queen's Park** (3)	17–0	Clachnacuddin (H&I)
**Dundee City** (4)	4–3 (a.e.t.)	BSC Glasgow (4)
Buchan (3)	2–3	**Aberdeen** (3)
Musselburgh Windsor (4)	2–5	**Westdyke** (3)
Panmure (4)	1–19	**Inverness Caledonian Thistle** (3)
**Boroughmuir Thistle** (3)	7–1	Montrose (3)
Deveronvale (3)	1–4 (a.e.t.)	**Edinburgh Caledonia** (4)
**West Park United** (4)	2–1	Borders (4)
Dryburgh Athletic (4)	1–2	**Stonehaven** (3)
United Glasgow (4)	0–6	**East Fife** (3)
Nairn (H&I)	0–7	**Clark Drive** (4)
Airdrie (4)	3–5	**Dunfermline Athletic** (3)
**Clyde** (4)	4–2	Bishopton (4)
**Raith Rovers** (3)	3–0 (Awarded)	Moray (4)
**Kilwinning SC** (4)	3–0 (Awarded)	Kelty Hearts (3)
**St Mirren** (4)	3–0 (Awarded)	Stranraer (4)
2 August 2019
**Stenhousemuir** (4)	3–0 (Awarded)	Pollok United (4)

== Third round ==
Teams competing in the 2019 Scottish Women's Premier League enter in this round. Teams in Bold advanced to the fourth round.

Home team	Score	Away team
11 August 2019
**Kilmarnock** (2)	4–3	East Fife (3)
**Queen's Park** (3)	5–1	Westdyke (3)
**Dundee City** (4)	4–3 (a.e.t.)	St Mirren (4)
**Dunfermline Athletic** (3)	8–2	Stonehaven (3)
Spartans (1)	1–2	**Aberdeen** (3)
**St Johnstone** (2)	2–0	Boroughmuir Thistle (3)
**Heart of Midlothian** (2)	24–0	Raith Rovers (3)
**Motherwell** (1)	2–0 (a.e.t.)	Partick Thistle (2)
Edinburgh Caledonia (4)	0–16	**Glasgow City** (1)
West Park United (4)	0–16	**Celtic** (1)
**Clyde** (4)	4–1	Clark Drive (4)
**Forfar Farmington** (1)	3–0 (Awarded)	Stenhousemuir (4)
Kilwinning SC (4)	w/o	**Hamilton Academical** (2)
18 August 2019
Hutchison Vale (2)	0–5	**Inverness Caledonian Thistle** (3)
**Rangers** (1)	6–0	Glasgow Girls (2)
21 August 2019
**Hibernian** (1)	5–0	Stirling University (1)

1. A-The Hutchison Vale-Inverness Caledonian Thistle and Rangers-Glasgow Girls matches were abandoned on 11 August 2019 due to waterlogged pitches and were replayed on 18 August 2019.
2. B-Hibernian's match against Stirling University was postponed from 11 August 2019 to 21 August 2019 due to Hibernian competing in the 2019–20 UEFA Women's Champions League qualifying round.

== Fourth round ==
Teams in Bold advanced to the quarter-finals.

Home team	Score	Away team
25 August 2019
**Queen's Park** (3)	4–2	Dunfermline Athletic (3)
**Hamilton Academical** (2)	12–0	Clyde (4)
**Glasgow City** (1)	20–0	Dundee City (4)
**Aberdeen** (3)	3–1	Kilmarnock (2)
Forfar Farmington (1)	0–4	**Rangers** (1)
Heart of Midlothian (2)	1–7	**Hibernian** (1)
**Celtic** (1)	2–0	St Johnstone (2)
**Motherwell** (1)	5–0	Inverness Caledonian Thistle (3)

== Quarter-finals ==
Teams in Bold advanced to the semi-finals.

Home team	Score	Away team
15 September 2019
**Hibernian** (1)	3–0	Hamilton Academical (2)
Celtic (1)	0–2	**Glasgow City** (1)
**Motherwell** (1)	5–0	Queen's Park (3)
Aberdeen (3)	0–1	**Rangers** (1)

== Semi-finals ==
Teams in Bold advanced to the final.

13 October 2019	Rangers	**1–4**	**Glasgow City**	Stirling
12:00	Boyce 34'	Report	McSorley 45'; Kerr 51'; McLauchlan 70', 85'	Stadium: Forthbank Stadium; Attendance: 351

13 October 2019	**Hibernian**	**4–1**	Motherwell	Stirling
15:30	Muir 22'; Cavanagh 30'; Hunter 44'; Boyle 56'	Report	Callaghan 62'	Stadium: Forthbank Stadium; Attendance: 237

== Final ==
24 November 2019

Hibernian	3–4	Glasgow City
Gallacher 31'; Napier 49'; Ross 53' (o.g.)	Report	McSorley 36'; Crichton 40'; Shine 70', 90'

Tynecastle Park, Edinburgh
Attendance: 3,123

**Hibernian**	**Glasgow City**

**1**	(Scotland) Jenna Fife
**3**	(Scotland) Amy Muir
**4**	(Scotland) Siobhan Hunter
**7**	(Scotland) Jamie-Lee Napier
**8**	(Scotland) Cailin Michie
**10**	(Scotland) Shannon McGregor
**11**	(Scotland) Colette Cavanagh
**15**	(Scotland) Amy Gallacher
**17**	(Scotland) Joelle Murray (c)
**19**	(Scotland) Chelsea Cornet
**23**	(Scotland) Rachael Boyle
Substitutes:
**13**	(Scotland) Jeni Currie
**9**	(Scotland) Lia Tweedie
**12**	(Scotland) Lauren Davidson
**14**	(Scotland) Shannon Leishman
**16**	(Scotland) Ellis Notley
**20**	(United States) Siobhan Higgins
**28**	(Scotland) Eilidh Adams
Manager:
(Scotland) Grant Scott

**29**	(Scotland) Lee Alexander
**2**	(Scotland) Rachel McLauchlan
**4**	(Scotland) Hayley Lauder
**6**	(Scotland) Jo Love
**8**	(Scotland) Leanne Crichton
**9**	(Scotland) Kirsty Howat
**10**	(Republic of Ireland) Clare Shine
**11**	(Scotland) Nicola Docherty
**16**	(Scotland) Leanne Ross (c)
**18**	(Scotland) Sam Kerr
**24**	(Scotland) Eilish McSorley
Substitutes:
**25**	(Scotland) Erin Clachers
**12**	(Scotland) Jenna Clark
**14**	(Scotland) Hayley Sinclair
**15**	(Scotland) Nicola Reid
**20**	(Scotland) Carly Girasoli
**23**	(Scotland) Megan Foley
Manager:
(Scotland) Scott Booth
