= Chloe Craig =

Scottish footballer (born 1993)

Personal information
- Full name: Chloe Norma Craig
- Date of birth: 4 September 1993 (age 33)
- Place of birth: Old Kilpatrick, Scotland
- Position: Defender

Youth career
- 2008–2009: Celtic

Senior career*
Years	Team	Apps	(Gls)
2009–	Celtic	119+	(36+)

International career
2009	Scotland U17	6	(1)
2010–2012	Scotland U19	17	(0)
- * Club domestic league appearances and goals

Chloe Norma Craig (born 4 September 1993) is a Scottish footballer who plays as a defender for Celtic in the Scottish Women's Premier League; she has spent her entire career at the club.

== Club career ==
Craig joined Celtic as a youth player in 2008 when the club was formed, and was one of the first players to step up to the senior squad a year later. She was a regular in defence over the next decade as the club occasionally challenged for honours without great success, and was among those to be offered a professional contract as Celtic increased their investment in women's football, as did rivals Rangers.

Following the enforced hiatus of the COVID-19 pandemic, Celtic won one Scottish Women's Premier League title, two Scottish Women's Cups and one SWPL Cup between 2021 and 2024, with Rangers claiming most of the other trophies on offer to usurp the traditionally dominant Glasgow City. As one of the most experienced players along with Kelly Clark and Natalie Ross, Craig had a major role in her club's progression, also passing personal milestones of 200 appearances (May 2021) and 100 goals (February 2024, with two penalties against Rangers – regular conversions from the spot contributing to a high scoring tally for a defensive player).

She was named in the first SWPL PFA Scotland Team of the Year for the 2021–22 season, and signed a new contract with Celtic shortly afterwards; in October 2023, she agreed an extension running til 2026.

On 6 September 2024, Celtic reported that Craig had ruptured the anterior cruciate ligament in her knee and would be out of action for an extended period. She eventually made her competitive return in December 2025.

On 25 June 2026 it was announced that Craig had extended her contract with the club until the summer of 2028.

== International career ==
Craig was selected regularly for Scotland up to the under-19s but has never been capped at full international level.

== Personal life ==
Raised in Clydebank, Craig was a postal worker prior to becoming a full-time footballer, often attending evening training sessions having already climbed several hundred flights of stairs that day on her delivery round among the tenements of Glasgow's South Side. Her father is Albert Craig, a former professional footballer (Dumbarton, Dundee, Partick Thistle) who also worked in the postal service.

In 2013, Craig received media attention after breaking a finger while catching a signed football kicked into the crowd by Rod Stewart – a Celtic supporter – during one of his concerts in Glasgow.

== Honours ==
Celtic

- Scottish Women's Premier League: 2023–24
- Scottish Women's Cup: 2021–22, 2022–23 2025–26
- Scottish Women's Premier League Cup: 2021–22; runner-up 2018
