= Clare Goldie =

Scottish footballer (born 2005)

Personal information
- Date of birth: 15 February 2005 (age 21)
- Place of birth: Bishopbriggs, Scotland
- Position: Midfielder

Team information
- Current team: Celtic
- Number: 41

Youth career
- 2015-2019: West Park United
- 2016-2021: Turnbull High School
- 2019-2021: Glasgow Girls & Women FC
- 2021-2022: Celtic

Senior career*
Years	Team	Apps	(Gls)
2022	Celtic	28	(3)

International career^{‡}
2023-2024	Scotland U19	8	(0)
- * Club domestic league appearances and goals as of 11 July 2026 ‡ National team caps and goals as of 11 July 2026

Clare Goldie (born 15 February 2005) is a Scottish footballer who plays for in midfield for Scottish Women's Premier League side Celtic and has represented Scotland at youth level.

== Club career ==
Goldie made her senior debut for Celtic on 16 October 2022, coming off the bench in a 7–0 win over Glasgow Women in the SWPL. She continued to feature intermittently throughout her first season training with the 1st team squad and made her first senior start on 5 February 2023 in a league match against Aberdeen.

She scored her first goal for Celtic on 23 August 2023, netting in a 5–0 away win against Spartans. On 26 November 2023 she scored her 2nd goal of the season in a record 13-0 victory against Aberdeen. Goldie then signed her first professional contract on 18 January 2024, a two‑and‑a‑half‑year deal with the club.

She spent a period of time out injured and while working back towards full fitness, it was announced on 15 October 2025 that she had suffered an ACL injury, ruling her out for an extended period.

Despite the setback, Celtic confirmed on 26 June 2026 that Goldie had extended her contract with the club until the summer of 2028, committing her long‑term future to the team.

== International career ==
Goldie has represented Scotland under‑19 a total of eight times between March 2023 until November 2024.

== Honours ==
Celtic

- Scottish Cup: 2022/23
- Scottish Women's Premier League: 2023/24
