= Nour Imane Addi =

Moroccan professional footballer

Personal information
- Date of birth: 10 June 1997 (age 29)
- Place of birth: Oued Zem, Morocco
- Height: 1.63 m (5 ft 4 in)
- Position: Center midfielder

Team information
- Current team: Albergaria
- Number: 17

College career
Years	Team	Apps	(Gls)
2021–2023	South Alabama Jaguars	34	(15)

Senior career*
Years	Team	Apps	(Gls)
2013–2021	AS FAR		
2023–2024	Celtic	13	(4)
2024–	Albergaria	7	(3)

International career
2017–	Morocco		(2)
- * Club domestic league appearances and goals as of 13 August 2022.

Nour Imane Addi (Arabic: نوريمان عدي; born 10 June 1997) is a Moroccan professional footballer who plays as a center midfielder for Campeonato Nacional Feminino club Albergaria and the Morocco women's national team.

== Early life ==
Addi was born and raised in Oued Zem.

== College career ==
Addi attended the University of South Alabama in the United States. She played two seasons for the USA Jaguars, totaling 15 goals and five assists. In 2021, she scored six goals in five starts, finishing the year with six goals in 14 games. In 2022, she was named a Sun Belt Conference first-team selection, as she scored 8 regular season goals (out of 9 total goals, 6 of those game-winning). She was also selected to the College Sports Communicators 2022 Academic All-America third team.

== Club career ==
Addi played for ASFAR in Morocco. In her time at ASFAR, she won eight Championships and eight Throne Cups. In 2021, she moved to the United States to play college football at the University of South Alabama. After playing for the USA Jaguars, she signed for Celtic on a two-year contract. She is the first African player to play for the club.

== International career ==
Addi has capped for Morocco at senior level. She made her debut in 2017. Her first international goal was in January 2020 against Tunisia. She played in the 2020 UNAF Women's Tournament in Tunisia, which Morocco won. Although she was selected for training and friendlies leading up to the 2022 Women's Africa Cup of Nations, she was not included in the final squad. She played in two friendlies in 2023 against Slovakia and Bosnia-Herzegovina. She was not selected for the 2023 Women's World Cup squad.

=== International goals ===
Scores and results list Morocco's goal tally first

No.	Date	Venue	Opponent	Score	Result	Competition	Ref.
1	28 January 2020	Stade Boubker Amer, Salé, Morocco	Tunisia	1–0	2–1	Friendly	
2	31 January 2020	Stade Municipal de Témara, Temara, Morocco	Tunisia	1–1	6–3	Friendly	

== See also ==
- List of Morocco women's international footballers
