= Shen Menglu =

Chinese footballer (born 2002)

Shen Menglu 沈梦露
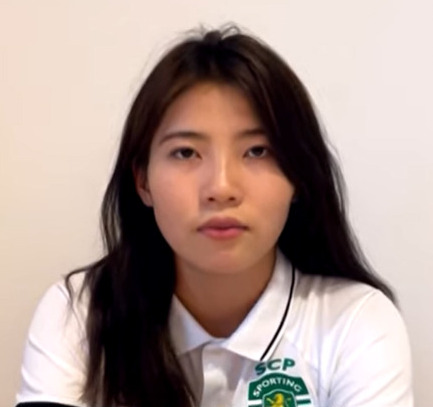

Personal information
- Date of birth: 10 May 2002 (age 24)
- Place of birth: Huai'an, Jiangsu, China
- Height: 1.62 m (5 ft 4 in)
- Positions: Midfielder; left-back

Senior career*
Years	Team	Apps	(Gls)
2020–2021	Jiangsu Suning	5	(0)
2021	Sporting CP B	1	(3)
2021	Sporting CP	2	(0)
2022	Atlético Ouriense	15	(0)
2022–2024	Celtic (Note: Soccerway do not credit Shen with a goal in Celtic's match against Hamilton Academical on 18 September 2022, instead incorrectly crediting teammate Shen Mengyu with the goal.)	54	(8)
2024–2026	Bayer 04 Leverkusen	10	(0)

International career^{‡}
2019–2020	China U19	5	(0)
2023–	China	3	(0)
- * Club domestic league appearances and goals as of 5 July 2026 ‡ National team caps and goals as of 10:38, 6 December 2023 (UTC)

Shen Menglu (Chinese: 沈梦露; born 10 May 2002) is a Chinese professional footballer currently playing as a midfielder for the China national team.

== Club career ==
=== Early career ===
Having represented Jiangsu Suning in her native China, Shen moved to Portugal in July 2021, joining Campeonato Nacional Feminino side Sporting CP. Though she made her debut for Sporting, and became the first Chinese woman to play in the top flight of Portuguese football, she found her opportunities limited, and terminated her contract after only half a year. She joined fellow Campeonato Nacional Feminino side Atlético Ouriense in January 2022, but struggled to establish herself in her natural role, finding herself playing left-back, a far-cry from her usual forward position.

=== Celtic ===
In July 2022, she moved to Scotland, signing with Scottish Women's Premier League side Celtic, joining compatriot Shen Mengyu. In only her first league start for the club, she scored her first goal for the club - the third in a 6–0 win against Hamilton Academical. Her second goal of the season came on 30 October in another SWPL 1 game against Glasgow City; having come on as a second-half substitute for Amy Gallacher, Shen's cross from the left wing inadvertently beat Glasgow City's goalkeeper Lee Gibson after a miscommunication between the goalkeeper and defender Claire Walsh.

She scored a similar goal in Celtic's 5–1 away win against Hearts in the Scottish Women's Cup on 19 March 2023, again scoring with a misplaced cross from the left wing. The same month, she was nominated for the SWPL 1 player of the month, but lost out to Rangers' Brogan Hay.

=== Bayer Leverkusen ===
On 22 July 2024, Shen joined Frauen-Bundesliga side Bayer 04 Leverkusen on a two-year deal.

== International career ==
Shen has represented China at under-19 level, being called up to the squad despite being a year younger than her teammates. She credits teammate and friend Shen Mengyu with helping her adapt, as Mengyu was captain of the side.

Shen had been called up to the China women's national football team in 2023, but had to withdraw due to injury. In July 2023, Chinese women's manager Shui Qingxia came under fire from fans and media in China for failing to call up Shen, as well as Zhao Yujie, who were both deemed to have deserved call-ups for their respective club performances. Both had received an initial call-up to a training camp in Qingdao, but were not included in the final squad ahead of the 2023 FIFA Women's World Cup.

She eventually made her senior national team debut on 29 October 2023 as a substitute in a 3–0 win against Thailand in the 2024 Olympic qualifying tournament.

== Personal life ==
In July 2023, Shen returned to her hometown of Huai'an in the Jiangsu Province of China to partake in a charity event, where she gave local children signed photos and jerseys.

== Career statistics ==
=== Club ===
As of match played 7 May 2026.

Appearances and goals by club, season and competition
Club	Season	League			National cup (Note: Includes Taça de Portugal, Scottish Women's Cup, DFB-Pokal Frauen)		League cup (Note: Includes Scottish Women's Premier League Cup)		Continental		Total	
Club	Season	Division	Apps	Goals	Apps	Goals	Apps	Goals	Apps	Goals	Apps	Goals
Jiangsu Suning	2020	CWSL	5	0	—		—		—		5	0
Sporting CP	2021–22	Campeonato Nacional	2	0	0	0	—		—		2	0
Atlético Ouriense	2021–22	Campeonato Nacional	15	0	1	0	—		—		16	0
Celtic	2022–23	SWPL	27	4	2	1	2	0	—		31	5
Celtic	2023–24	SWPL	27	4	1	0	3	1	2 (Note: Appearances in UEFA Women's Champions League qualification)	0	33	5
Celtic	Total		54	8	4	1	5	1	2	0	64	10
Bayer Leverkusen	2024–25	Frauen-Bundesliga	9	0	3	0	—		—		12	0
Bayer Leverkusen	2025–26	Frauen-Bundesliga	1	0	0	0	—		—		1	0
Bayer Leverkusen	Total		10	0	3	0	0	0	0	0	13	0
Career total			86	8	7	1	5	1	2	0	100	10

=== International ===
As of match played 5 December 2023

Appearances and goals by national team and year
National team	Year	Apps	Goals
China	2023	3	0
Total		3	0
