= Sam Kerr (footballer, born 1999) =

Scottish footballer (born 1999)

Samantha Kerr
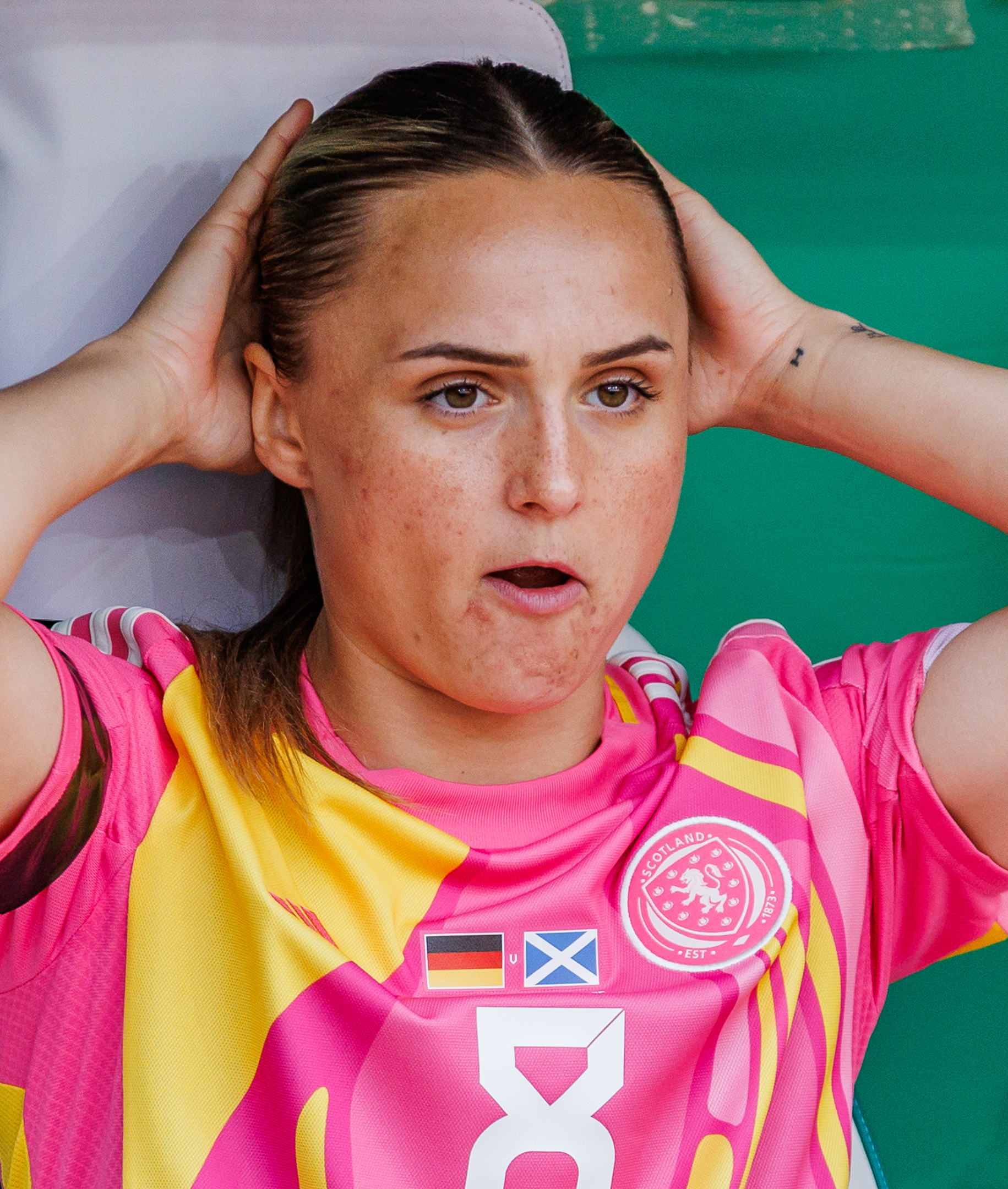
- Kerr with Scotland in 2025

Personal information
- Full name: Samantha Mary Kerr
- Date of birth: 17 April 1999 (age 27)
- Place of birth: Falkirk, Scotland
- Height: 1.68 m (5 ft 6 in)
- Position: Central midfielder

Team information
- Current team: Liverpool
- Number: 24

Youth career
- 2012–2014: Falkirk Girls
- 2014–2015: Central Girls

Senior career*
Years	Team	Apps	(Gls)
2015	Central Girls		
2016–2020	Glasgow City		
2021–2023	Rangers	59	(15)
2023–2025	Bayern Munich	21	(0)
2025	→ Liverpool (loan)	11	(0)
2025–	Liverpool	16	(0)

International career^{‡}
2014	Scotland U16	2	(0)
2015–2016	Scotland U17	9	(0)
2016–2018	Scotland U19	8	(3)
2020–	Scotland	34	(1)
- * Club domestic league appearances and goals as of 17:10, 21 November 2026 (UTC) ‡ National team caps and goals as of 02:23, 24 October 2025 (UTC)

Samantha Mary Kerr (born 17 April 1999) is a Scottish professional footballer who plays as a central midfielder for Women's Super League club Liverpool and the Scotland national team. She has previously played for Central Girls, Glasgow City, Rangers and Bayern Munich.

== Club career ==
Kerr played for Central Girls (previously Falkirk FC Girls) from age 12 to 16. In May 2015, she captained Graeme High School to the Scottish School Girls Cup.

=== Glasgow City ===
In January 2016, at the age of 16, Kerr signed for Glasgow City. Of her signing, Glasgow City head coach Scott Booth said, "Sam Kerr is a young player with special qualities... We are delighted she has chosen to join Glasgow City to further develop her talents as she progresses into a fantastic career in the game." In March 2016, she helped the club defeat Glasgow Girls to advanced to the semi-finals of the Scottish Women's Premier League Cup. Kerr was a member of The Glasgow City squad that won the SWPL for the 10th consecutive year at the end of the 2016 season; this was the first time in Scottish football history that any senior club achieved this (no men's team amassed more than nine in a row). She also participated in more title wins in 2018, 2017 and 2019 – the 2020 season was cancelled due to the COVID-19 pandemic in Scotland – and played in the UEFA Women's Champions League, reaching the quarter-finals of the competition in 2019–20.

=== Rangers ===
In December 2020, Kerr moved to Rangers on a pre-contract arrangement agreed six months earlier (teammate Kirsty Howat made the same switch). In the 2021–22 season, she scored the first-ever goal scored by the women's team at Ibrox Stadium in a win over Aberdeen, and was named in the PFA Scotland Team of the Year as Rangers won the SWPL championship for the first time.

=== Bayern Munich ===
Kerr signed a three-year contract with Bayern Munich on 30 May 2023. She was part of the squad which won the Frauen-Bundesliga in the 2023-24 season.

==== Liverpool (loan) ====
On 8 January 2025, Kerr joined Liverpool on loan for the remainder of the 2024–25 season. On 18 July 2025, it was announced that Kerr had joined Liverpool permanently on transfer.

== International career ==
Kerr has represented Scotland at the under-15 and under-17 levels including the group stage of the 2014 UEFA Women's Under-17 Championship. Her UEFA competition debut was on 9 October 2014 against Montenegro. Samantha has also represented Scotland at the under-19 level at The Euros and The La Manga Cup in Spain. She was added to the full Scotland squad for the first time in November 2018, and was one of two uncapped players picked for the 2020 Pinatar Cup. Kerr made her full international debut in that tournament, playing the last 13 minutes of a 3–0 win against Ukraine on 4 March.

== Career statistics ==
=== Club ===
As of match played 14 November 2026

Appearances and goals by club, season and competition
Club	Season	League			National cup (Note: Includes Scottish Women's Cup, DFB-Pokal, Women's FA Cup)		League cup (Note: Includes Scottish Women's Premier League Cup, Women's League Cup)		Continental (Note: Includes UEFA Women's Champions League)		Total	
Club	Season	Division	Apps	Goals	Apps	Goals	Apps	Goals	Apps	Goals	Apps	Goals
Rangers	2020–21	SWPL	16	6	—		—		—		16	6
Rangers	2021–22	SWPL	15	3	1	0	3	2	—		19	5
Rangers	2022–23	SWPL	28	6	2	1	1	0	4	0	35	7
Rangers	Total		59	15	3	1	4	2	4	0	70	18
Bayern Munich	2023–24	Frauen-Bundesliga	13	0	3	0	—		1	0	17	0
Bayern Munich	2024–25	Frauen-Bundesliga	8	0	1	0	—		2	0	11	0
Bayern Munich	Total		21	0	4	0	0	0	3	0	28	0
Liverpool (loan)	2024–25	Women's Super League	11	0	3	1	1	0	—		15	1
Liverpool	2025–26	Women's Super League	8	0	0	0	2	1	—		10	1
Liverpool	2026–27	Women's Super League	8	0	0	0	0	0	—		8	0
Liverpool	Total		16	0	0	0	2	1	0	0	17	1
Career total			111	15	10	2	7	3	7	0	131	20

=== International ===
As of match played 25 February 2025

Appearances and goals by national team and year
National team	Year	Apps	Goals
Scotland	2020	1	0
Scotland	2021	1	0
Scotland	2022	7	0
Scotland	2023	11	1
Scotland	2024	12	0
Scotland	2025	2	0
Total		34	1

Scores and results list Scotland's goal tally first, score column indicates score after each Kerr goal.

List of international goals scored by Sam Kerr
No.	Date	Venue	Opponent	Score	Result	Competition
1	14 July 2023	Dens Park, Dundee, Scotland	Northern Ireland	2–0	3–0	Friendly

== Honours ==
=== Club ===
Glasgow City

- Scottish Women's Premier League: 2016, 2017, 2018, 2019
- Scottish Women's Cup: 2019

Rangers

- Scottish Women's Premier League: 2021–22
- SWPL Cup: 2022–23
- City of Glasgow Woman's Cup: 2022

Bayern Munich

- Frauen-Bundesliga: 2023–24

=== Individual ===
- Scotland Player of the Year: 2022
