= Lauren Davidson =

Scottish footballer

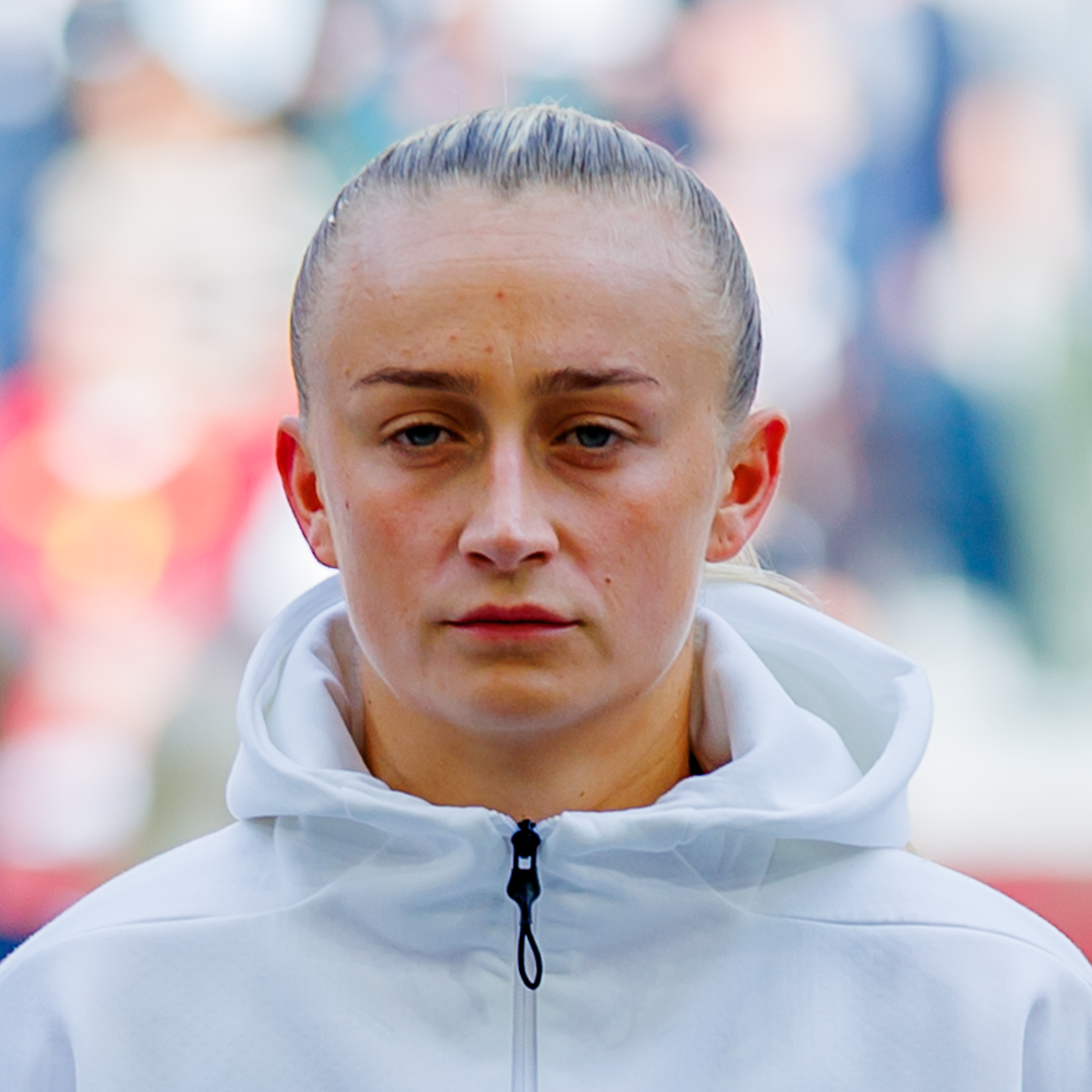
- Davidson lining up for Scotland, 2025

Personal information
- Full name: Lauren Alison Davidson
- Date of birth: 1 October 2001 (age 25)
- Place of birth: Scotland
- Positions: Forward; winger

Team information
- Current team: Brann

Youth career
- Celtic
- Rangers
- Glasgow City

Senior career*
Years	Team	Apps	(Gls)
2018–2020	Hibernian		
2020–2024	Glasgow City	59+	(42+)
2024–	Brann	47	(19)

International career^{‡}
2016	Scotland U16	2	(0)
2016–2017	Scotland U17	5	(1)
2017–2020	Scotland U19	22	(1)
2021–	Scotland	34	(4)
- * Club domestic league appearances and goals as of 6 August 2026 ‡ National team caps and goals as of 15 October 2026

Lauren Alison Davidson (born 1 October 2001) is a Scottish footballer who plays as a forward or winger for Toppserien club Brann and the Scotland national team.

== Club career ==
Raised in Bishopbriggs, Davidson played with boys at local Rossvale and for the girls' youth teams of Celtic, Rangers and Glasgow City. After a stint with Hibernian, where she won the Scottish Women's Cup in 2018 and the SWPL Cup in 2019, she joined the senior squad of reigning league champions Glasgow City in August 2020, at which time she was also employed as a home delivery driver for a supermarket.

Following the cancellation of an entire season due to COVID-19 and a switch from a summer to a winter schedule, Davidson and City finished on the losing side to Celtic in both domestic cup finals in 2021–22, while their long run of league titles was ended by Rangers (both rivals greatly increased their budgets for their women's teams and saw improved results on the field). Glasgow City recovered the following year to win the 2022–23 Scottish Women's Premier League on a dramatic last matchday, with Davidson scoring in stoppage time at Ibrox for a 1–0 win for her team which lifted them above Celtic by a point (other results could also have allowed Rangers to retain the championship).

Davidson left Glasgow City and signed a two-and-a-half-year deal with Norwegian club Brann in July 2024.

== International career ==
Davidson represented Scotland at the under-16, under-17 and under-19 levels. She was added to the full national team in September 2021 and made her international debut that month in a 2–0 win against Hungary, appearing as a late substitute for Claire Emslie.

== International goals ==
No.	Date	Venue	Opponent	Score	Result	Competition
1.	18 February 2023	Pinatar Arena, San Pedro del Pinatar, Spain	Philippines	1–0	2–1	2023 Pinatar Cup
2.	7 March 2026	Hampden Park, Glasgow, Scotland	Luxembourg	5–0	7–0	2027 FIFA Women's World Cup qualification
3.	5 June 2026	Bozsik Aréna, Budapest, Hungary	Israel	5–0	6–0	2027 FIFA Women's World Cup qualification
4.	13 October 2026	St Mirren Park, Paisley, Scotland	Czech Republic	1–1	3–2	2027 FIFA Women's World Cup play-offs
