= Shen Mengyu =

Chinese footballer (born 2001)

Shen Mengyu 沈梦雨
Personal information
- Date of birth: 19 August 2001 (age 25)
- Place of birth: Shanghai, China
- Height: 1.70 m (5 ft 7 in)
- Position: Midfielder

Senior career*
Years	Team	Apps	(Gls)
2020–2021	Shanghai Shengli	13	(2)
2021–2024	Celtic	99	(14)
2024–2025	London City Lionesses	13	(0)

International career^{‡}
2023–	China	18	(3)
- * Club domestic league appearances and goals as of 6 May 2025 ‡ National team caps and goals as of 9 July 2025

Shen Mengyu (Chinese: 沈梦雨; pinyin: Shěn Mèngyǔ; born 19 August 2001) is a Chinese professional footballer who plays as a midfielder for the China national team.

== Club career ==
Born in Shanghai in 2001, she played for Shanghai Shengli before joining Celtic in the Scottish Women's Premier League at the age of 19, becoming the first Chinese woman to play in Scotland.

In her first season, Shen helped Celtic win the 2021–22 Scottish Women's Premier League Cup and the 2021–22 Scottish Women's Cup, the first time the Hoops achieved the double knockout trophy success. That summer, fellow Chinese player Shen Menglu also signed for Celtic. In 2023, the team retained the Scottish Cup.

=== London City Lionesses ===
On 2 August 2024, she joined the Women's Championship side London City Lionesses on a three-year contract. In her first season with the team, London City Lionesses won the title of the league and were promoted to the Women's Super League. On 11 July 2025, the club announced Shen had left by mutual consent ahead of the 2025–26 season.

== International career ==
On 5 July 2023, Shen was included in the 23-player squad for the FIFA Women's World Cup 2023. She made her senior international debut on 22 July 2023 in a 1–0 loss against Denmark in the World Cup group stage match.

== Career statistics ==
=== Club ===
As of match played 18 April 2025

Appearances and goals by club, season and competition
Club	Season	League			National Cup (Note: Scottish Women's Cup for Celtic; Women's FA Cup for London City Lionesses)		League Cup (Note: Scottish Women's Premier League Cup for Celtic; FA Women's League Cup for London City Lionesses)		Continental (Note: UEFA Women's Champions League for Celtic)		Total	
Club	Season	Division	Apps	Goals	Apps	Goals	Apps	Goals	Apps	Goals	Apps	Goals
Shanghai Shengli	2020	CWSL	10	2	—		—		—		10	2
Shanghai Shengli	2021	CWSL	3	0	—		—		—		3	0
Shanghai Shengli	Total		13	2	—		—		—		13	2
Celtic	2021–22	SWPL	27	3	2	1	4	0	2	0	35	4
Celtic	2022–23	SWPL	28	6	1	0	0	0	—		29	6
Celtic	2023–24	SWPL	28	2	3	2	2	0	2	0	35	4
Celtic	Total		83	11	6	3	6	0	4	0	99	14
London City Lionesses	2024–25	Women's Championship	9	0	2	0	2	0	—		13	0
London City Lionesses	Total		9	0	2	0	2	0	—		13	0
Career Total			105	13	8	3	8	0	4	0	125	16

=== International ===
As of match played 13 July 2025

Appearances and goals by national team and year
National team	Year	Apps	Goals
China	2023	10	2
China	2024	3	0
China	2025	3	0
Total		16	2

Scores and results list China's goal tally first, score column indicates score after each Shen goal.

List of international goals scored by Shen Mengyu
No.	Date	Venue	Opponent	Score	Result	Competition	Ref.
1	28 September 2023	Linping Sports Center Stadium, Hangzhou, China	Uzbekistan	3–0	6–0	2022 Asian Games	
2	5 December 2023	Toyota Stadium, Texas, United States	United States	0–1	2–1	Friendly	
3	13 July 2025	Hwaseong Stadium, Hwaseong, South Korea	Chinese Taipei	2–0	4–2	2025 EAFF E-1 Football Championship	

Match reports

== Honours ==
London City Lionesses

- Women's Championship: 2024–25

Celtic

- Scottish Women's Premier League: 2023–24
- Scottish Cup: 2021–22, 2022–23
- Scottish Women's Premier League Cup: 2021–22
