= 2023–24 Scottish Women's Premier League =

Scottish Women's Premier League
- Season: 2023–24
- Champions: Celtic (1st title)
- Relegated: Hamilton Academical
- Champions League: Celtic, Rangers
- Matches: 168
- All statistics correct as of 18 May 2024.

The 2023–24 Scottish Women's Premier League was the 23rd season of the SWPL, the highest division of women's football in Scotland since 2002. Sponsored by ScottishPower, the league was played with 12 clubs. It was the second season of operation under the auspices of the Scottish Professional Football League.

Glasgow City were the defending champions, after winning their 14th title in 16 seasons on a dramatic last matchday of 2022–23 to stay ahead of Celtic and Rangers, both of whom could have finished as champions depending on the results. The newcomers to SWPL 1 were Montrose, restoring a representation for the Angus region in the top tier after long-time members Forfar Farmington resigned from the league in 2021.

A 12-club "split" format was used in SWPL 1 in 2023–24, with a double round-robin before the "split", then another double round-robin of the top six and bottom six clubs respectively. The SWPL previously used a "split" format between the 2012 and 2015 seasons. The 12th-placed club in SWPL 1 would relegated to be replaced by the SWPL 2 winner, with a promotion/relegation play-off taking place between the clubs finishing 11th in SWPL 1 and 2nd in SWPL 2. The league season began on 13 August 2023 and ended on 19 May 2024.

The championship was again settled on the final matchday, which Celtic and Rangers started on the same points after pulling ahead of Glasgow City; Celtic's superior goal difference meant they led the table and only had to match Rangers' result to win the title. However, while Rangers quickly took and kept a lead against Partick Thistle, Celtic struggled to break down the Hibernian defence. In the 90th minute, Amy Gallacher scored the only goal of the match at Celtic Park to give her side their first league championship in the women's game. Celtic's men's team had also won the 2023–24 Scottish Premiership, and this was the first instance of a club holding both national championships at the same time. Rangers had some consolation in winning both the SWPL Cup and the Women's Scottish Cup.

At the bottom of the SWPL 1 table, Hamilton were relegated with Queen's Park coming up to replace them; Dundee United survived by defeating Kilmarnock in the play-off.

== Teams ==
Team	Location	Manager	Home ground	Capacity	2022–23 position
Aberdeen	Cove Bay	(England) Clinton Lancaster	Balmoral Stadium	2,602	9th
Celtic	Airdrie	(Spain) Fran Alonso (to January 2024) (Sweden) Elena Sadiku (from January 2024)	Excelsior Stadium	10,101	2nd
Dundee United	Dundee	(Scotland) Graeme Hart (to March 2024) (Scotland) Suzy Shepherd (from March 2024)	Foundation Park	TBC	10th
Glasgow City	Springburn	(Scotland) Leanne Ross	Petershill Park	1,000	1st
Hamilton Academical	Hamilton	(Scotland) Robert Watson	New Douglas Park	6,018	11th
Heart of Midlothian	Edinburgh	(Spain) Eva Olid	Oriam	1,000	4th
Hibernian	Edinburgh	(Scotland) Grant Scott	Meadowbank Stadium	1,320	5th
Montrose	Montrose	(Scotland) Craig Feroz	Links Park	4,936	1st in SWPL 2
Motherwell	Motherwell	(Scotland) Paul Brownlie	Alliance Park	500	8th
Partick Thistle	Springburn	(Scotland) Brian Graham	Petershill Park	1,000	6th
Rangers	Cumbernauld	(England) Jo Potter	Broadwood Stadium	8,086	2nd
Spartans	Edinburgh	(Scotland) Debbi McCulloch (to January 2024) (Scotland) Jack Beesley (from January 2024)	Ainslie Park	3,000	7th

Locations of teams in the SWPL 1

== Regular season ==
Pos	Team	Pld	W	D	L	GF	GA	GD	Pts	Qualification or relegation
1	Rangers	22	19	3	0	92	10	+82	60	Qualification for the Top six
2	Celtic	22	18	2	2	102	13	+89	56	Qualification for the Top six
3	Glasgow City	22	18	2	2	72	13	+59	56	Qualification for the Top six
4	Hibernian	22	12	3	7	60	32	+28	39	Qualification for the Top six
5	Heart of Midlothian	22	13	3	6	58	22	+36	42	Qualification for the Top six
6	Partick Thistle	22	12	2	8	35	35	0	38	Qualification for the Top six
7	Aberdeen	22	8	1	13	34	72	−38	25	Qualification for the Bottom six
8	Motherwell	22	6	1	15	30	56	−26	19	Qualification for the Bottom six
9	Spartans	22	3	4	15	26	57	−31	13	Qualification for the Bottom six
10	Montrose	22	3	4	15	25	86	−61	13	Qualification for the Bottom six
11	Dundee United	22	3	1	18	19	86	−67	10	Qualification for the Bottom six
12	Hamilton Academical	22	2	4	16	17	88	−71	10	Qualification for the Bottom six

Rules for classification: 1) Points; 2) Goal difference; 3) Number of goals scored

== Top six ==
Pos	Team	Pld	W	D	L	GF	GA	GD	Pts	Qualification or relegation
1	Celtic (C)	32	26	4	2	126	18	+108	82	Qualification for the Champions League first round
2	Rangers	32	26	4	2	113	18	+95	82	Qualification for the Champions League first round
3	Glasgow City	32	23	4	5	89	25	+64	73	
4	Heart of Midlothian	32	17	3	12	68	41	+27	54	
5	Hibernian	32	14	4	14	71	47	+24	46	
6	Partick Thistle	32	13	2	17	42	66	−24	41	

Updated to match(es) played on 19 May 2024. Source:
Rules for classification: 1) Points; 2) Goal difference; 3) Number of goals scored
(C) Champions

== Bottom six ==
Pos	Team	Pld	W	D	L	GF	GA	GD	Pts	Qualification or relegation
7	Motherwell	32	14	3	15	57	66	−9	45	
8	Aberdeen	32	12	4	16	57	92	−35	40	
9	Montrose	32	9	6	17	46	101	−55	33	
10	Spartans	32	7	6	19	44	74	−30	27	
11	Dundee United	32	4	3	25	28	109	−81	15	Qualification for the SWPL Play-off Final
12	Hamilton Academical (R)	32	3	5	24	31	115	−84	14	Relegation to SWPL2

Updated to match(es) played on 19 May 2024. Source:
Rules for classification: 1) Points; 2) Goal difference; 3) Number of goals scored
(R) Relegated

=== Monthly awards ===
SWPL 1 monthly awards 2023–24
Month	Player of the Month	Club	Ref	Goal of the Month	Club	Ref
August	Amy Gallacher	Celtic		Mia McAulay	Rangers	
September	Kirsty Howat	Rangers		Keira Chuter	Dundee United	
October	Kirsty Howat	Rangers		Sade Adamolekun	Hearts	
November	Rio Hardy	Rangers		Kit Loferski	Celtic	
December	Caitlin Hayes	Celtic		Rosie Slater	Partick Thistle	
January	Rachel Rowe	Rangers		Rosie Slater	Partick Thistle	
February	Emma Thomson	Hamilton Academical		Chloe Muir	Hamilton Academical	
March	Natasha Flint	Celtic		Rachel Donaldson	Partick Thistle	
April	Laura Berry	Motherwell		Hannah Innes	Aberdeen	
May	Amy Gallacher	Celtic		Lia Tweedie	Hibernian	
