= Natalie Ross =

Scottish footballer (born 1989)

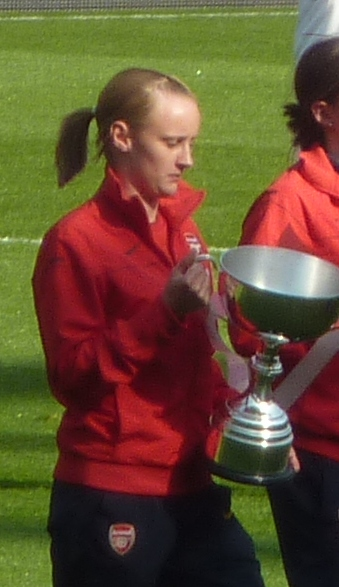
- Natalie Ross in May 2009

Personal information
- Date of birth: 14 September 1989 (age 37)
- Place of birth: Aberdeen, Scotland
- Position: Midfielder

Team information
- Current team: Celtic
- Number: 5

Youth career
- Ellon Meadows
- Hibernian Ladies

Senior career*
Years	Team	Apps	(Gls)
2004–2008	Hibernian Ladies		
2008–2010	Arsenal Ladies	5	(0)
2011	→ Hibernian Ladies (loan)		
2012	Celtic	20	(2)
2012	Lewes		
2013–2015	Rangers	20	(7)
2016–	Celtic	25	(6)

International career^{‡}
2007–2008	Scotland U19	9	(0)
2008–2021	Scotland	12	(0)
- * Club domestic league appearances and goals as of 01 May 2023 (UTC) ‡ National team caps and goals as of 23:55, 17 March 2012 (UTC)

Natalie Ross (born 14 September 1989) is a Scottish football midfielder who plays for Celtic and has represented Scotland at both youth and senior level.

== Club career ==
Ross began her career with Hibernian Ladies before moving to Arsenal Ladies in July 2008. An ankle injury disrupted her progress over two seasons at Arsenal, leading to a loan return to Hibernian in January 2011. She then signed with Celtic at the start of the 2012 season.

After a short spell back in England with Lewes, Ross signed with Rangers in January 2013 and returned to Celtic in January 2016.

== International career ==
Ross made her debut for the senior Scotland team at the Cyprus Women's Cup in March 2008, against the Netherlands as a second-half substitute for Julie Fleeting.

== Personal life ==
Natalie Ross’s brother, Frank Ross, is also a footballer, previously with Aberdeen and currently playing in the USL with One Knoxville SC. Her father, Frank Ross, won the Scottish Cup as head coach of Aberdeen Girls u15’s in 2002 & 2004.

== Honours ==
=== Arsenal ===
- London County Cup: 2009

=== Celtic ===
- SWPL Cup: 2017

Individual

- MNE Premier Division Player of the Year: 2012
- SWPL Player of the Month: March 2015
