= Hana Kerner =

American soccer player

Personal information
- Date of birth: March 17, 1997 (age 29)
- Place of birth: Upper Saddle River, New Jersey, United states
- Position: Defender

Hana Kerner (born March 17, 1997) is an American soccer player who plays for Celtic and previously played for Stade de Reims.
