= Kit Loferski =

American soccer player

Personal information
- Full name: Katherine Loferski
- Date of birth: October 1, 1997 (age 29)
- Height: 1.63 m (5 ft 4 in)
- Position: Forward

Kit Loferski (born 1 October 1997) is an American soccer player who plays for Celtic and previously played for Åland United.

== Honours ==
Åland United

- Finnish Women's Cup: 2020

Celtic

- Scottish Women's Premier League: 2023–24
- Scottish Cup: 2022–23
