= Caitlin Hayes =

Irish footballer (born 1995)

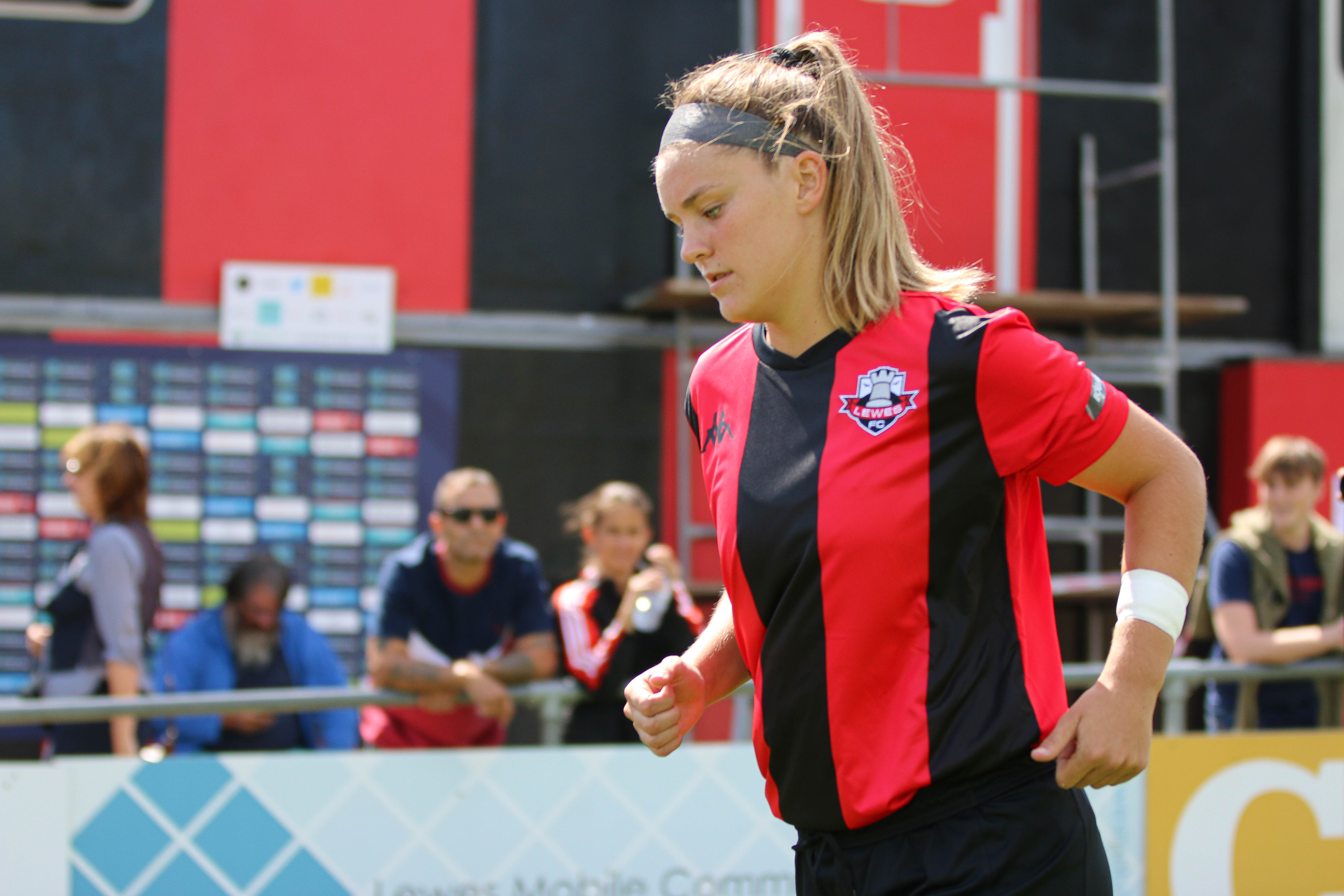
- Playing for Lewes in August 2019

Personal information
- Full name: Caitlin Mary Hayes
- Date of birth: 22 September 1995 (age 31)
- Place of birth: Warrington, England
- Height: 1.83 m (6 ft 0 in)
- Position: Defender

Team information
- Current team: Brighton & Hove Albion
- Number: 18

Youth career
- ?: Manchester United
- ?: Manchester City

College career
Years	Team	Apps	(Gls)
2014–2017	Mississippi College	67	(19)

Senior career*
Years	Team	Apps	(Gls)
2014	Everton	0	(0)
2018–2019	Barcelona FA		
2019–2020	Lewes	11	(0)
2020–2025	Celtic	75	(30)
2025–	Brighton & Hove Albion	34	(3)

International career^{‡}
2023–	Republic of Ireland	34	(2)
- * Club domestic league appearances and goals as of 22 November 2026 ‡ National team caps and goals as of 9 October 2026

Caitlin Hayes (born 22 September 1995) is a footballer who plays as a defender for Women's Super League club Brighton & Hove Albion. Born in England, she represents the Republic of Ireland at international level.

== Early life ==
Hayes grew up in Warrington, England.

== Education ==
Hayes attended Mississippi College in the United States, where she majored in kinesiology.

== Career ==
Hayes has played for Scottish side Celtic, helping the club win the SWPL Cup in 2021 (scoring the only goal of the final) and the Scottish Women's Cup in both 2022 and 2023.

On 23 January 2025, it was announced that Hayes had signed for Brighton & Hove Albion.

== Style of play ==
Hayes mainly operates as a defender and has been known for her goalscoring ability.

== Career statistics ==
=== Brighton & Hove Albion ===
As of match played 22 November 2026

Season	League			FA Cup		League Cup		Total	
Season	Division	Apps	Goals	Apps	Goals	Apps	Goals	Apps	Goals
2024–25	Women's Super League	6	0	1	0	0	0	7	0
2025–26	Women's Super League	17	1	4	1	3	0	24	2
2026–27	Women's Super League	11	2	0	0	5	2	16	4
Total		34	3	5	1	8	2	47	6

=== International ===
As of match played 9 October 2026

Appearances and goals
National team	Year	Apps	Goals
Republic of Ireland	2023	6	2
Republic of Ireland	2024	12	0
Republic of Ireland	2025	9	0
Republic of Ireland	2026	7	0
Total		34	2

Scores and results list Republic of Ireland's goal tally first.

List of international goals scored
No.	Date	Venue	Opponent	Score	Result	Competition
1	26 September 2023	Hidegkuti Nándor Stadion, Budapest, Hungary	Hungary	1–0	4–0	2023–24 UEFA Women's Nations League
2	5 December 2023	Windsor Park, Belfast, Northern Ireland	Northern Ireland	6–1	6–1	2023–24 UEFA Women's Nations League

== Personal life ==
Caitlin is the daughter of Duane Hayes. Her Irish origins are through a grandfather from County Offaly.

== Honours ==
Celtic

- Scottish Women's Premier League: 2023–24
- Scottish Women's Cup: 2021–22, 2022–23
- Scottish Women's Premier League Cup: 2021–22

Individual

- Scottish Women's Premier League Team of the Year: 2021–22, 2022–23, 2023–24
- Scottish Women's Premier League Player of the Month: December 2023
