= Colette Cavanagh =

Scottish footballer (born 1998)

Personal information
- Full name: Colette Cavanagh
- Date of birth: 24 November 1998 (age 27)
- Place of birth: Glasgow, Scotland
- Position: Midfielder

Team information
- Current team: Ipswich Town
- Number: 11

Youth career
- Rossvale
- 2011–2015: Celtic

Senior career*
Years	Team	Apps	(Gls)
2015–2016	Celtic		
2016–2017	Spartans	23	(4)
2018	Celtic		
2019–2022	Hibernian		
2022–2023	Rangers	11	(6)
2023–2025	Celtic	27	(5)
2025–2026	Deportivo de La Coruña		
2026–	Ipswich Town	0	(0)

International career^{‡}
2012	Scotland U15	1	(0)
2013–2014	Scotland U16	4	(0)
- * Club domestic league appearances and goals as of 13 May 2024 ‡ National team caps and goals as of 1 October 2022

Colette Cavanagh (born 24 November 1998) is a Scottish footballer who currently plays as a midfielder for Ipswich Town in the Women's Super League 2.

== Career ==
Cavanagh started her career at youth level with Rossvale, then joined Celtic Girls in 2011. She made her first team debut aged 16 before joining Spartans when she relocated to attend the University of Edinburgh. She returned to Celtic for a season in 2018 before moving to Hibernian, and was part of the team that won the 2019 Scottish Women's Premier League Cup. As a Hibs player she won the SWPL 1 Player of the Month for September 2021, becoming the first player to win the award with two different clubs (her first was with Celtic in May 2018), and in 2022 was included in the first-ever PFA Scotland Women's Team of the Year.

In July 2022 Cavanagh joined Rangers where she spent one season, scoring 6 goals in 11 appearances, then returned to Celtic for a third spell before the start of the 2023–24 season.

== Honours ==
Hibernian

- Scottish Women's Premier League Cup: 2019

Rangers

- Scottish Women's Premier League Cup: 2022–23
- City of Glasgow Women's Cup: 2022
