= Pamela Tajonar =

Mexican footballer (born 1984)

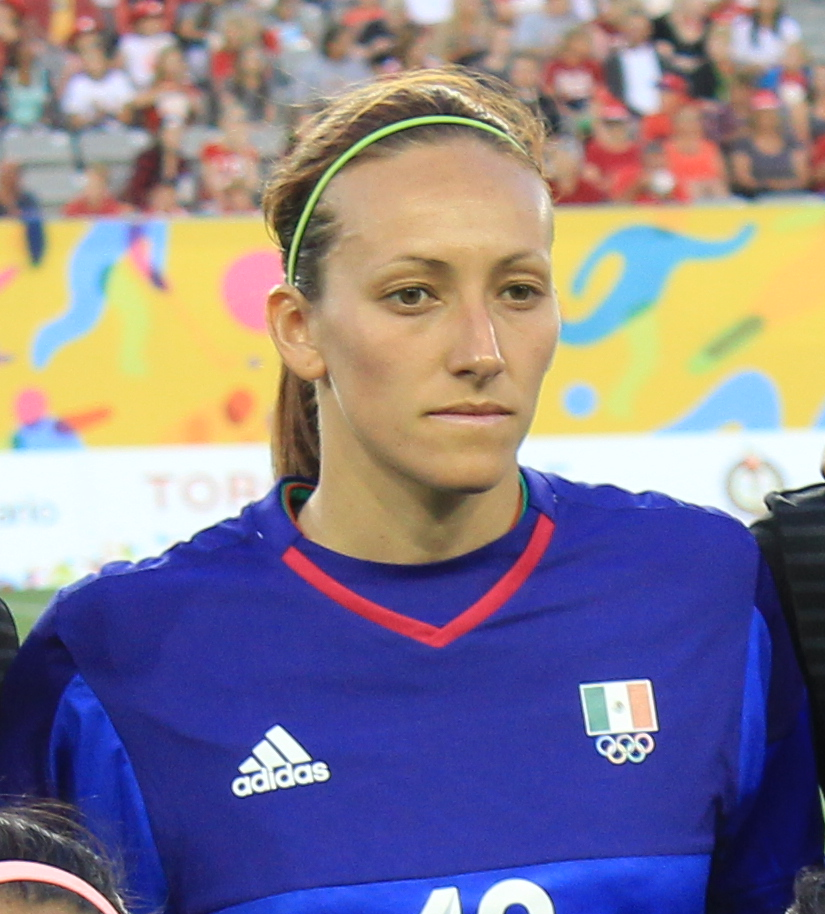
- Tajonar in 2015

Personal information
- Full name: Pamela Tajonar Alonso
- Date of birth: 2 December 1984 (age 41)
- Place of birth: Cuernavaca, Morelos, Mexico
- Height: 1.70 m (5 ft 7 in)
- Position: Goalkeeper

Team information
- Current team: Kolbotn IL
- Number: 12

Senior career*
Years	Team	Apps	(Gls)
2002–2003	Querétaro		
2007–2011	ITESM Puebla		
2005	Arizona Heatwave		
2006–2007	FC Indiana	11	(0)
2010	Buffalo Flash		
2011	Atlético Málaga		
2011	LdB FC Malmö	2	(0)
2012	Levante Las Planas	13	(0)
2013	Western New York Flash	1	(0)
2013–2014	Atlético Málaga	10	(0)
2014–2018	Sevilla	27	(0)
2018–2020	Barcelona	5	(0)
2020–2021	Logroño	31	(0)
2021–2022	Villarreal	5	(0)
2022–2023	Celtic	25	(0)
2023–2026	Monterrey	55	(0)
2026–	Kolbotn IL	0	(0)

International career^{‡}
2002–2018	Mexico	58	(0)
- * Club domestic league appearances and goals as of 23:30, 1 February 2026 (UTC) ‡ National team caps and goals as of 10:17, 18 June 2015 (UTC)

Pamela Tajonar Alonso (born 2 December 1984) is a Mexican professional footballer who plays as a goalkeeper for Kolbotn IL and the Mexico women's national team.

== Club career ==
=== FC Indiana ===
Tajonar signed for FC Indiana.

=== Buffalo Flash ===
Tajonar played for the Buffalo Flash of the W-League twice, winning the title in 2010.

=== Atlético Málaga ===
Tajonar made her professional debut in the Spanish league for Atlético Málaga.

=== LdB Malmö ===
In 2011, she signed with Damallsvenskan champion LdB Malmö. She made two appearances for the team after Þóra Helgadóttir earned a red card. Following the end of the season she left Malmö, and next summer she returned to Spain, joining newly promoted Levante Las Planas, with which she played about half of the season's games.

=== Western New York Flash ===
On 11 January 2013 she signed for Western New York Flash as part of the NWSL Player Allocation for the inaugural season of the National Women's Soccer League. She started the season on the bench, behind Adrianna Franch.

=== Sevilla ===
Tajonar signed for Spanish Primera División club Sevilla in August 2014, after spending four months back in Mexico on a government-backed project to coach soccer to street children. Sevilla were relegated from the top division in 2014–15, but Tajonar decided to remain with the team for their Segunda División campaign.

== International career ==
Tajonar is a member of the Mexico national team, having taken part in the 2004 Summer Olympics and the 2011 World Cup and 2015 World Cup as well as the 2003, 2007, 2011 and 2015 Pan American Games and the 2024 Gold Cup.

== Honours ==
LdB Malmö

- Damallsvenskan: 2011
- Svenska Supercupen: 2011

Western New York Flash

- NWSL Shield: 2013

FC Barcelona

- Primera División: Winner, 2019–20
- UEFA Women's Champions League: Runner-up, 2018–19
- Supercopa Femenina: Winner, 2020
- Copa Catalunya: Winner, 2018, 2019

Monterrey

- Liga MX Femenil: Clausura 2024
