= Amy Gallacher =

Scottish footballer (born 1998)

Personal information
- Full name: Amy Catherine Gallacher
- Date of birth: 15 December 1998 (age 27)
- Place of birth: Dundee, Scotland
- Positions: Midfielder; forward

Team information
- Current team: Celtic
- Number: 7

Senior career*
Years	Team	Apps	(Gls)
2013–2016	Forfar Farmington		
2016–2022	Hibernian		
2022–	Celtic	114	(57)

International career^{‡}
2012	Scotland U15	2	(0)
2013–2014	Scotland U16	4	(1)
2015	Scotland U17	5	(2)
2015–2017	Scotland U19	15	(4)
2023–	Scotland	3	(0)
- * Club domestic league appearances and goals as of 20 May 2024 ‡ National team caps and goals as of 20 May 2024

Amy Catherine Gallacher (born 15 December 1998) is a Scottish footballer who plays as a midfielder or forward for Scottish Women's Premier League club Celtic and the Scotland national team.

== Career ==
Gallacher made her senior debut aged 14 playing for Forfar Farmington. In December 2016, she joined Hibernian, where she became regarded as one of the Edinburgh club's most important players and won five trophies: two Scottish Women's Cups and three SWPL Cups.

In July 2022, Gallacher signed for Celtic. She won the Scottish Women's Cup in her first season with the Hoops, also scoring 16 league goals as the team narrowly missed out on becoming Scottish Women's Premier League champions for what would have been the first time in their history. She was nominated for the SWPL Player of the Year (it was won by teammate Caitlin Hayes). A year later, Gallacher's 90th-minute winning goal against former club Hibs clinched the 2023–24 SWPL title for Celtic on goal difference.

Gallacher represented Scotland at youth levels up to the under-19 team. She made her full international debut for Scotland on 22 September 2023, appearing as a substitute in a Nations League match against England.

On 26 June 2026 Celtic announced that Gallacher had signed a contract extension keeping her at the club until Summer 2028.

== Playing style ==
Gallacher mainly operates as a midfielder and is known for her versatility.

== Personal life and education ==
Gallacher grew up in Dundee and attended Morgan Academy. She later studied Sport and Exercise at Abertay University; during her studies, she was a part of the university's Elite Athlete Development Programme.

She is related to Scottish footballers Tommy Gallacher (granddaughter) and Kevin Gallacher (cousin once removed), as well as Ireland international Patsy Gallacher (great-granddaughter).
