= Scotland women's national under-19 football team =

National U-19 association football team

Scotland Women's U-19
- Association: Scottish Football Association
- Confederation: UEFA (Europe)
- Head coach: Gary Doctor
- FIFA code: SCO
First colours	Second colours

UEFA Women's Under-19 Championship
- Appearances: 6 (first in 2005)
- Best result: Group stage, 2005, 2008, 2010, 2014, 2017, 2019

FIFA U-20 Women's World Cup
- Appearances: 0

Scotland women's national under-19 football team represents Scotland at the UEFA Women's Under-19 Championship and the FIFA U-20 Women's World Cup.

== History ==
=== UEFA Women's Under-19 Championship ===
The Scottish team has participated in the UEFA Women's Under-19 Championship six times, but has yet to progress past the group stage. Scotland hosted the 2019 finals in July 2019.

Year	Result	Matches	Wins	Draws*	Losses	GF	GA
Two-legged final 1998	did not enter						
(Sweden) 1999	did not enter						
(France) 2000	did not qualify						
(Norway) 2001	did not qualify						
(Sweden) 2002	did not qualify						
(Germany) 2003	did not qualify						
(Finland) 2004	did not qualify						
(Hungary) 2005	Group stage	3	0	0	3	2	11
(Switzerland) 2006	did not qualify						
(Iceland) 2007	did not qualify						
(France) 2008	Group stage	3	0	0	3	2	12
(Belarus) 2009	did not qualify						
(North Macedonia) 2010	Group stage	3	0	1	2	5	11
(Italy) 2011	did not qualify						
(Turkey) 2012	did not qualify						
(Wales) 2013	did not qualify						
(Norway) 2014	Group stage	3	1	0	2	4	8
(Israel) 2015	did not qualify						
(Slovakia) 2016	did not qualify						
(Northern Ireland) 2017	Group stage	3	0	1	2	1	5
(Switzerland) 2018	did not qualify						
(Scotland) 2019	Group stage	3	0	0	3	1	10
(Georgia (country)) 2020	Cancelled due to COVID-19						
(Belarus) 2021	Cancelled due to COVID-19						
(Czech Republic) 2022	did not qualify						
(Belgium) 2023	did not qualify						
(Lithuania) 2024	did not qualify						
(Poland) 2025	did not qualify						
(Bosnia and Herzegovina) 2026	did not qualify						
(Hungary) 2027	TBD						
Total	6/26	18	1	2	15	15	57

== Minor Tournaments ==
Year	Competition	Result	GP	W	D*	L	GS	GA	Ref
(Northern Ireland) 2002	Jubilee Cup	Third Place	2	1	0	1	3	2	
(Spain) 2003	Four Nations Tournament	Tenth Place	3	0	1	2	2	7	

== Current Squad ==
The following players were named in the squad for a double header against Slovakia.
Head Coach: Gary Doctor

No.	Pos.	Player	Date of birth (age)	Club
	GK	Rowena Armitage		(Scottish Football Association) Hibernian
	GK	Braelynn Galt		(United States Soccer Federation) Tampa Bay Sun
	DF	Darra Dawson		(Scottish Football Association) Celtic
	DF	Kate Fraser		(Scottish Football Association) Partick Thistle (loan)
	DF	Erin Husband		(Scottish Football Association) Heart of Midlothian
	DF	Jess Husband		(Scottish Football Association) Heart of Midlothian
	DF	Abigail Tobin		(Scottish Football Association) Aberdeen
	DF	Ella West		(The Football Association) Sunderland
	MF	Lucy Barclay		(Scottish Football Association) Hamilton Academical
	MF	Sophie Black		(Scottish Football Association) Rangers
	MF	Olivia Chomczuk		(Scottish Football Association) Montrose (loan)
	MF	Sienna McGoldrick		(Scottish Football Association) Celtic
	MF	Ashley Robertson		(Scottish Football Association) Montrose (loan)
	FW	Laura Berry		(Scottish Football Association) Rangers
	FW	Lucie Burns		(Scottish Football Association) Kilmarnock
	FW	Cara Gray		(Scottish Football Association) Kilmarnock (loan)
	FW	Amelia Oldroyd		(The Football Association) Manchester City
	FW	Sophie Townsley		(Scottish Football Association) Hamilton Academical (loan)

== Coaches ==
Manager Name	Years active
Tony Gervaise	2005–2009
Shelley Kerr	2009–2013
Gareth Evans	2013–2017
Pauline Hamill	2017–2023
Billy Davies (interim)	2023–2024
Gary Doctor	2024–

== See also ==
- Scotland women's national football team
- Scotland women's national under-17 football team
- FIFA U-20 Women's World Cup
- UEFA Women's Under-19 Championship
