= Petershill Park =

Sports complex in Glasgow, Scotland

- The Peasy
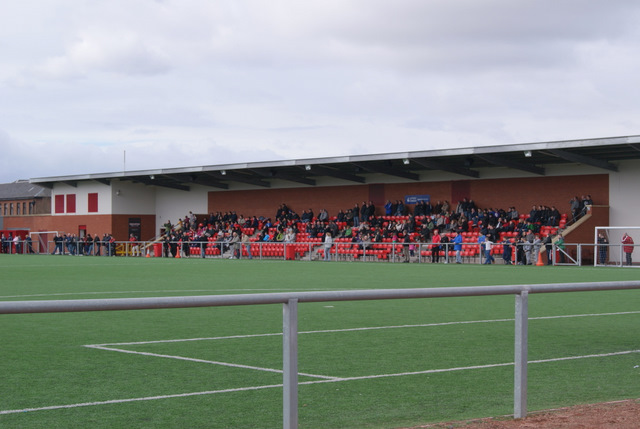

- Location within Glasgow council area
- Location: Springburn, Glasgow, Scotland
- Coordinates: 55°52′39.94″N 4°13′47.29″W
- Capacity: 1,000 (500 seated)
- Surface: Astroturf (2007–present)

Construction
- Opened: 2007

Tenants
- Petershill (2007–); Glasgow City; Partick Thistle Women; Caledonian Locomotives (2011–2017, 2021–2026)

Petershill Park is a leisure centre and football stadium located in the Springburn suburb of Glasgow, the largest city in Scotland. It has a third generation full-size outdoor football pitch, and has floodlights.

It is host to the men's West of Scotland Football League football side Petershill and formerly Caledonian Locomotives (until their dissolution in 2026). The women's football teams Glasgow City and Partick Thistle Women also play their home games at the stadium. It is known locally as The Peasy which is also the nickname of the Petershill club.

== History ==
Petershill had spent most of their existence (since 1935) playing at the old Petershill Park. In 2005, it was demolished and replaced with a modern structure that could also be used by the local community. This was also to be known as Petershill Park. The two grounds occupied the same general location but were on adjacent plots - the old ground was closer to Southloch Street (a section of boundary wall with the club crest still exists there) and had a north-south orientation of its playing field, while the new ground is east-west.

== Facilities ==
The stadium can also hold up to 2,000 spectators, with one stand (known as the main stand) containing 500 seats. This stand is attached to the club building, containing a bar, a function room, gymnasium, dance studio and health suite. Opposite the main stand is two steps of terracing, with a business centre located next to the right side of the main stand. To the left of the main stand, is more terracing. The centre also has a full-size football pitch, plus a number of 5-a-side pitches.

== UEFA club matches ==
Over the two spells that Glasgow City have used the venue as a home ground, Petershill has played host to UEFA Women's Champions League football. Memorable matches have included a heavy defeat against German giants Turbine Potsdam in 2011 and a British clash with Arsenal in the last 16 in 2013.

After a spell at the Excelsior Stadium, City returned to Petershill in mid-2017 and their Last 32 Champions League tie v BIIK Kazygurt was shown on the BBC Sport website on what was a dramatic encounter which Glasgow City won 4–1 but lost out on away goals after the aggregate scoreline finished 4–4.

== Accessibility ==
The ground is only walking distance away from the railway stations, Barnhill and Springburn. By road, it is located next to the A803 leading onto the M8 a mile away.
