= Partick Thistle W.F.C. =

Partick Thistle
- Full name: Partick Thistle Women's Football Club
- Nicknames: Thistle, The Jags, The Harry Wraggs, The Maryhill Magyars
- Founded: 2013 (as Thistle Weir Ladies)
- Ground: Petershill Park; Adamswell Street; Springburn; Glasgow
- Manager: Gary Holt
- League: SWPL 1
- 2025-26: SWPL 1, 6th of 12th
| Home colours | Away colours |

Partick Thistle Women's Football Club, formerly known as Thistle Weir Ladies Football Club, is a Scottish women's football club based in the city of Glasgow. The club currently plays in the Scottish Women's Premier League, the top division of football in Scotland.

== History ==
Thistle Weir Ladies Football Club was officially founded as part of the Thistle Weir Academy in 2014, having previously existed as part of the Charitable Trust for one year prior to that. On 22 October 2018, because the top two teams in the SWFL 1 South (Hibernian U23s and Celtic Academy) were not eligible for promotion as subsidiaries of top division clubs, third-placed Thistle Weir were promoted to the Scottish Women's Premier League 2.

On 23 January 2019, the club rebranded as Partick Thistle Women's Football Club. In September 2020, a new management team made up of three Partick Thistle professional men's team players was appointed, with Brian Graham as manager, in what the club believed was the first arrangement of its kind.

Partick initially failed to gain promotion from the SWPL2 in 2020–21, finishing in 3rd, but were invited to join the top division when Forfar Farmington resigned their place just before the new season began. With an expansion of the SWPL at end of 2021–22 (announced in April 2022) including no relegation, it would mean at least one more season for the Jags in the highest tier.

== Stadium ==
The club currently play its home games at the Partick Thistle Charitable Trust-owned Petershill Park in the Springburn area of Glasgow.

== Players ==
=== Current squad ===
As of 3 July 2026

Note: Flags indicate national team as defined under FIFA eligibility rules; some limited exceptions apply. Players may hold more than one non-FIFA nationality.

| No. | Pos. | Nation | Player |
|---|---|---|---|
| 1 | GK | SCO | Jennifer Currie |
| 2 | DF | SCO | Rosie Slater |
| 4 | DF | SCO | Cheryl McCulloch |
| 5 | DF | SCO | Demi Falconer |
| 6 | MF | SCO | Jo Love |
| 9 | FW | SCO | Cara Henderson |
| 12 | FW | SCO | Rachel Donaldson |

| No. | Pos. | Nation | Player |
|---|---|---|---|
| 15 | MF | SCO | Mae English |
| 16 | MF | SCO | Keira Syrjanen |
| 17 | DF | SCO | Jenna Ferguson |
| 22 | MF | SCO | Hannah Robinson |
| 25 | GK | SCO | Lucy MacNair |
| 27 | FW | ENG | Imogen Longcake |
| – | DF | SCO | Shona Cowan |

== Records ==
=== Year-by-year ===
Results of league and cup competitions by season
| Season | Division | P | W | D | L | F | A | Pts | Pos | Scottish Women's Cup | League Cup (Note: Includes the Scottish Women's Football League Second Division Cup, Scottish Women's Football League First Division Cup and the Scottish Women's Premier League Cup) |
| Season | League | | | | | | | | | Scottish Women's Cup | League Cup |
|---|---|---|---|---|---|---|---|---|---|---|---|
| 2016 | SWFL 2 Central | 21 | 18 | 1 | 2 | 107 | 22 | 55 | 1st | N/A | First Round |
| 2017 | SWFL 1 South | 20 | 11 | 4 | 5 | 50 | 44 | 37 | 3rd | Preliminary Round | First Round |
| 2018 | SWFL 1 South | 22 | 13 | 4 | 5 | 53 | 26 | 43 | 3rd | Second Round | Semi-final |
| 2019 | SWPL 2 | 21 | 8 | 6 | 7 | 44 | 27 | 30 | 5th | Third Round | First Round |
| 2020 | SWPL 2 | 0 | 0 | 0 | 0 | 0 | 0 | 0 | N/A (Note: Competition cancelled due to the COVID-19 pandemic in Scotland.) | N/A | Group stage |
| 2020–21 | SWPL 2 | 18 | 11 | 2 | 5 | 46 | 22 | 35 | 3rd | N/A | N/A |
| 2021–22 | SWPL 1 | 27 | 4 | 6 | 17 | 29 | 70 | 18 | 9th | Semi-final | Quarter-final |
| 2022–23 | SWPL 1 | 22 | 9 | 4 | 9 | 37 | 50 | 31 | 6th | Fifth round | Second round |
| 2023–24 | SWPL 1 | 32 | 13 | 2 | 17 | 42 | 66 | 41 | 6th | Quarter-final | Runners-up |

Source: Soccerway
