= 2014 Scottish Women's Premier League Cup =

Tournament details
- Country: Scotland
- Teams: 12

Final positions
- Champions: Glasgow City
- Runners-up: Hibernian

Tournament statistics
- Matches played: 11
- Goals scored: 53 (4.82 per match)
- All statistics correct as of 27 October 2022.

The 2014 Scottish Women's Premier League Cup was the 13th edition of the Scottish Women's Premier League Cup, which began in 2002. The competition was to be contested by all 12 teams of the Scottish Women's Premier League (Scottish Women's Premier League (SWPL).

== First round ==
Eight teams were scheduled to contest the first round; Forfar Farmington forfeited their tie against Glasgow City, who were given a bye into the next round.

14 March 2014	Forfar Farmington	0–3 (awarded)	Glasgow City
16.00

14 March 2014	Inverness City	2–3	Aberdeen	Inverness
14.00				Stadium: Lister Park

14 March 2014	Hibernian	12–0	Hutchison Vale	Broxburn
14.00				Stadium: Albyn Park

14 March 2014	Rangers	0–1	Spartans	Glasgow
12.00			Goal	Stadium: Petershill Park

== Quarter finals ==
13 April 2014	Aberdeen	2–1	Spartans	Aberdeen
14.00				Stadium: Heathryfold Park

13 April 2014	Hibernian	7–0	Buchan LFC	Broxburn
14.00				Stadium: Albyn Park

13 April 2014	Celtic	4–0	Hamilton Academical	Glasgow
15.00				Stadium: Barrowfield Park

13 April 2014	Queen's Park	0–13	Glasgow City	Glasgow
17.15				Stadium: Toryglen Regional Football Centre

== Semi finals ==
11 May 2014	Celtic	0–3	Hibernian	Alloa
12.00			Graham; Hunter; Z. Johnstone	Stadium: Indodrill Stadium

11 May 2014	Aberdeen	0–2	Glasgow City	Alloa
15.00			Ross; O'Sullivan	Stadium: Indodrill Stadium

== Final ==
28 May 2014
14.00

Hibernian	0–3	Glasgow City
		Lappin; O'Sullivan; Love

Ainslie Park, Edinburgh

Hibernian	Glasgow City

(Scotland) Hannah Reid
(Scotland) Kirsty Smith
(Scotland) Kayleigh McConnell
(Scotland) Laura Murray
(Scotland) Clare Williamson
(Scotland) Lisa Robertson (c)
(Scotland) Zoe Johnstone
(Scotland) Claire Emslie
(Scotland) Rachel Walkingshaw
(Scotland) Caroline Heron
(Scotland) Lizzie Arnot
Substitutes:
(Scotland) Jenna Fife
(New Zealand) Tiffany Kawana-Haugh
(Scotland) Elliss Jenkins
Manager:
(Scotland) Willie Kirk

(Scotland) Lee Alexander
(Scotland) Nicola Docherty
(Scotland) Eilish McSorley
(Scotland) Emma Black
(Scotland) Leanne Ross (c)
(Northern Ireland) Julie Nelson
(Scotland) Jo Love
(Republic of Ireland) Denise O'Sullivan
(Scotland) Fiona Brown
(Scotland) Abbi Grant
(Scotland) Suzanne Lappin
Substitutes:
(Scotland) Laura Hamilton
(Scotland) Danica Dalziel
(Scotland) Leanne Crichton
(Scotland) Courtney Whyte
(Scotland) Cheryl McCulloch
Manager:
(Scotland) Eddie Wolecki Black
