= 2013 Scottish Women's Cup =

Tournament details
- Country: Scotland

Final positions
- Champions: Glasgow City
- Runners-up: Hibernian

The 2013 Scottish Women's Cup was the 42nd official edition (44th overall) of the main national cup competition in Scottish women's football. All teams in the Scottish Women's Football League and Premier League were eligible to enter. Caithness Ladies who dod not play in national league competition also entered for the second time.

== Calendar ==
Round	Date	Matches	Clubs	New entries this round
Preliminary round	21 April 2013	13	65 → 52	26
First round	19 May 2013	20	52 → 32	27
Second round	23 June 2013	16	32 → 16	12
Third round	18 August 2013	8	16 → 8	none
Quarter-finals	8 September 2013	4	8 → 4	none
Semi-finals	6 October 2013	2	4 → 2	none
Final	17 November 2013	1	2 → 1	none

== Preliminary round ==
The draw for the preliminary round was announced on 4 April 2013.

Home team	Score	Away team
Seton Ladies	1 – 1; 3 – 4 pens.	Dundee City
East Fife	3 – 1	Aberdeen Reserves
Raith Rovers	3 – 2	Falkirk FC
FC Kilmarnock Ladies	1 – 2	Musselburgh Windsor
Inverness City	4 – 0	Kilwinning SC Development
Forfar Farmington Ladies	0 – 4	Paisley Saints Ladies
East Fife Violet	0 – 13	Heart of Midlothian
Buchan Youth	1 – 8	Dee Vale
Elgin City	8 – 1	FC Edinburgh Ladies
Stonehaven	6 – 3	Whitburn
Dunfermline 2013	0 – 4	Murieston United
Jeanfield Swifts	4 – 2	Aberdeen Development
Heart of Midlothian Development	7 – 0	Hamilton Caledonian

== First round ==
The draw for the first round was announced on 25 April 2013.

Home team	Score	Away team
Viewfield Rovers	w/o	Kemnay
Dee Vale	13 – 0	Caithness Ladies
Heart of Midlothian	7 – 0	Stenhousemuir
Musselburgh Windsor	2 – 4	Hibernian Development
Boroughmuir Thistle	2 – 1	Hutchison Vale Reserves
Tayside Ladies	4 – 2 (a.e.t.)	Murieston United
Elgin City	2 – 3	East Fife
Jeanfield Swifts	1 – 3	Spartans Reserves
Glasgow Girls	27 – 0	Irvine Thistle
Edinburgh Caledonia	2 – 4	Turriff United
Paisley Saints Ladies	5 – 0	Luthermuir
Cowdenbeath	w/o	Stonehaven
Dee Ladies	3 – 6	Dundee City
Cumbernauld Colts	12 – 0	Stranraer
Dumfries	2 – 1	Raith Rovers
Queen's Park	1 – 0	Dunfermline Athletic
Falkirk Ladies Reserves	3 – 1	Heart of Midlothian Development
Inverness City	5 – 5; 5 – 6 pens.	Mill United
Leith Athletic	0 – 7	Glasgow Girls LFC
Murieston United Reds	2 – 10	Claremont

== Second round ==
The draw for the second round was made on 28 May 2013.

Home team	Score	Away team
Buchan	2 – 3	Cumbernauld Colts
Viewfield Rovers	3 – 0	Turriff United
Hibernian Development	1 – 1; 2 – 3 pens.	Hutchison Vale
Kilwinning SC	6 – 1	Dundee City
Hamilton Academical	0 – 5	Rangers
Queen's Park	6 – 2	Mill United
Falkirk Ladies Reserves	4 – 0	Tayside Ladies
Cowdenbeath	5 – 3 (a.e.t.)	Dee Vale
Heart of Midlothian	2 – 7	Spartans
Spartans Reserves	6 – 1	Glasgow Girls LFC
Glasgow Girls	2 – 1	Falkirk Ladies
Claremont	2 – 9	Aberdeen
Dumfries	1 – 6	Paisley Saints Ladies
Forfar Farmington	2 – 5	Celtic
Glasgow City	5 – 0	East Fife
Boroughmuir Thistle	0 – 11	Hibernian

== Third round ==
Home team	Score	Away team
Rangers	13 – 1	Spartans Reserves
Cowdenbeath	1 – 7	Spartans
Falkirk Ladies Reserves	0 – 6	Hibernian
Celtic	9 – 1	Queen's Park
Hutchison Vale	0 – 1	Aberdeen
Glasgow City	w/o	Kilwinning SC
Viewfield Rovers	1 – 0	Cumbernauld Colts
Paisley Saints Ladies	2 – 4	Glasgow Girls

== Quarter-finals ==
Home team	Score	Away team
Spartans	0 – 8	Glasgow City
Rangers	4 – 1	Aberdeen
Celtic	10 – 0	Viewfield Rovers
Hibernian	10 – 0	Glasgow Girls

== Semi-finals ==
The draw for the semi-finals took place on 9 September 2013.

6 October 2013	Rangers	1–1 (a.e.t.) (4–5 p)	Hibernian	Ravenscraig Regional Sports Facility, Motherwell
12:00	A. Harrison 65'	Report	R. Walkingshaw 60'

6 October 2013	Glasgow City	3–0	Celtic	Ravenscraig Regional Sports Facility, Motherwell
15:15	Love 22'; Lappin 80' 90'	Report

== Final ==
17 November 2013
14:00

Hibernian	0 – 1	Glasgow City
		Lynn 88' (o.g.)

Broadwood Stadium, Cumbernauld
Attendance: 623
Referee: Lorraine Clark

Hibernian	Glasgow City

1	(Scotland) Shannon Lynn
4	(Scotland) Frankie Brown
10	(Scotland) Clare Williamson
11	(Scotland) Kirsty Smith
17	(Scotland) Joelle Murray (c)
5	(Scotland) Siobhan Hunter
20	(Scotland) Susan Fairlie
2	(Scotland) Laura Murray
19	(Scotland) Mariel Kaney
18	(Scotland) Rachel Walkingshaw (substituted off)
7	(Scotland) Lizzie Arnot
Substitutes:
13	(Scotland) Hannah Reid
21	(Scotland) Jenna Fife
3	(Scotland) Kayleigh McConnell
12	(Scotland) Katey Turner
15	(Scotland) Sarah Laverty
22	(New Zealand) Tiffany Kawana-Waugh
23	(Scotland) Zoe Johnstone (substituted on)
Manager:
(Scotland) Willie Kirk

21	(Scotland) Danica Dalziel
5	(Scotland) Eilish McSorley
14	(Scotland) Rachel Corsie (c) (substituted off)
11	(Scotland) Nicola Docherty
23	(Northern Ireland) Julie Nelson
8	(Scotland) Leanne Crichton (substituted off)
22	(Wales) Jess Fishlock
18	(Republic of Ireland) Denise O'Sullivan (substituted off)
7	(Scotland) Christie Murray (substituted off)
10	(Scotland) Suzanne Lappin
9	(Republic of Ireland) Ruesha Littlejohn (substituted off)
Substitutes:
1	(Scotland) Lee Alexander
3	(Scotland) Lisa Robertson (substituted on)
4	(Scotland) Danni Pagliarulo
6	(Scotland) Jo Love (substituted on)
14	(Scotland) Sarah Crilly (substituted on)
15	(Scotland) Emma Black (substituted on)
16	(Scotland) Leanne Ross (substituted on)
Manager:
(Scotland) Eddie Wolecki Black
