= Nicola Docherty =

Scottish footballer (born 1992)

Personal information
- Full name: Nicola Docherty
- Date of birth: 23 August 1992 (age 34)
- Place of birth: Falkirk, Scotland
- Height: 5 ft 7 in (1.70 m)
- Position: Defender

Team information
- Current team: Rangers
- Number: 2

Youth career
- 2002–: Falkirk Girls

Senior career*
Years	Team	Apps	(Gls)
2002–2010	Falkirk Ladies		
2010–2011	Rangers	20	(3)
2012–2020	Glasgow City		
2020–	Rangers	84	(7)

International career^{‡}
- Scotland U15
2008–2009	Scotland U17	3	(0)
2009–2011	Scotland U19	13	(2)
2011–	Scotland	75	(2)
- * Club domestic league appearances and goals as of 1 May 2023 ‡ National team caps and goals as of 15 October 2026

Nicola Docherty (born 23 August 1992) is a Scottish international footballer who currently plays as a left sided defender for Rangers in the Scottish Women's Premier League.

== Career ==
Docherty started playing with Falkirk Girls at the age of 10 and was called up to the Scotland under-15 squad in 2006. She continued to represent Scotland through the under-17 and under-19 age groups and was a member of the squad that qualified for the UEFA Under-19 Women's Championship finals in 2010. Docherty left Falkirk to sign for Rangers in the same year.

She made her full debut for the Scotland women's team in September 2011 against Finland.

In January 2012, Docherty joined SWPL champions Glasgow City. She moved to Rangers in February 2020, following their decision to adopt professional status.

== Career statistics ==
=== International appearances ===
Scotland statistics accurate as 18 April 2024

Year	Scotland	
Year	Apps	Goals
2011	1	0
2012	2	0
2013	2	0
2014	6	0
2015	1	0
2016	—	
2017	1	0
2018	—	
2019	9	0
2020	2	0
2021	6	0
2022	9	1
2023	12	1
2024	4	0
Total	55	2

=== International goals ===
As of match played 11 April 2023. Scotland score listed first, score column indicates score after each of her goals.

No.	Date	Venue	Opponent	Score	Result	Competition
1.	6 September 2022	Tórsvøllur, Tórshavn, Faroe Islands	Faroe Islands	1–0	6–0	2023 FIFA Women's World Cup qualification
2.	7 April 2023	Plough Lane, London, England	Australia	1–0	1–0	Friendly

== Honours ==
Glasgow City

- Scottish Women's Premier League: 2012, 2013, 2014, 2015, 2016, 2017, 2018, 2019
- Scottish Women's Cup: 2012, 2013, 2014, 2015, 2019
- Scottish Women's Premier League Cup: 2012, 2013, 2014, 2015

Rangers

- Scottish Women's Premier League: 2021–22
- Scottish Women's Cup: 2023–24
- Scottish Women's Premier League Cup: 2022–23, 2023–24, 2024–25
- City of Glasgow Woman's Cup: 2022, 2023

Scotland

- Pinatar Cup: 2020
