= 2015 Scottish Women's Premier League Cup =

Tournament details
- Country: Scotland
- Teams: 16

Final positions
- Champions: Glasgow City
- Runners-up: Hibernian

Tournament statistics
- Matches played: 11
- Goals scored: 50 (4.55 per match)
- All statistics correct as of 26 October 2022.

The 2015 Scottish Women's Premier League Cup was the 14th edition of the Scottish Women's Premier League Cup which began in 2002. The competition was to be contested by all 12 teams of the Scottish Women's Premier League (SWPL).

== First round ==
The draw for the first round took place on Saturday, 8 January 2015 at Hampden Park.

1 March 2015	Heart of Midlothian	0–8	Celtic	Edinburgh
14.30 pm			? ? ? ? ? ? ? ?	Stadium: East Peffermill

1 March 2015	Hibernian	8–0	Hamilton Academical	Broxburn
14.00 pm	? ? ? ? ? ? ? ?			Stadium: Albyn Park

1 March 2015	Rangers	0–1	Spartans	Glasgow
12.00 pm			?	Stadium: Garscube Sports Complex

1 March 2015	Forfar Farmington	0–3 (awarded)	Hutchison Vale	Forfar
12.00 pm				Stadium: Station Park

== Quarter-finals ==
The draw for the quarter-final took place on Saturday, 4 March 2015 at Hampden Park.

19 April 2015	Inverness City	1–2	Aberdeen	Inverness
13.00 pm	?		? ?	Stadium: Millburn Academy

19 April 2015	Hibernian	2–2 (4–1 p)	Spartans	Broxburn
14.00 pm	?		?	Stadium: Albyn Park

19 April 2015	Stirling University	0–4	Celtic	Stirling
14.00 pm				Stadium: Gannochy Sports Centre

19 April 2015	Glasgow City	11–0	Hutchison Vale	Airdrie
14.30 pm				Stadium: Excelsior Stadium

== Semi-finals ==
The draw for the semi-final took place on Saturday, 20 April 2015 at Hampden Park.

10 May 2015	Celtic	0–4	Glasgow City	Edinburgh
12:00 pm		Report 1 Report 2	Lauder 35'; Montgomery 62'; Ross 75'; Docherty 77'	Stadium: Ainslie Park

10 May 2015	Hibernian	4–0	Aberdeen	Edinburgh
15:00 pm	Graham 45+1' 68'; Arnot 74' (pen.); Murray 80'	Report		Stadium: Ainslie Park

== Final ==
3 June 2015
19:30

Glasgow City	2–1 (a.e.t.)	Hibernian
Montgomery 77'; Fairlie 94'		Richards 27'

Ainslie Park, Edinburgh
Referee: Nicolle Andrews

Glasgow City	Hibernian

(Scotland) Lee Alexander
(Scotland) Emma Black (c)
(Scotland) Rhonda Jones (substituted off) 77'
(Scotland) Cheryl McCulloch (substituted off) 118'
(Scotland) Nicola Docherty
(Northern Ireland) Kerry Montgomery
(Scotland) Jo Love
(Scotland) Abbi Grant
(Republic of Ireland) Denise O'Sullivan
(Scotland) Hayley Lauder (substituted off) 66'
(Scotland) Susan Fairlie
Substitutes:
(Scotland) Leanne Ross (substituted on) 66' (substituted off) 120'
(Scotland) Lauren McMurchie (substituted on) 118'
(Scotland) Erin Cuthbert (substituted on) 77'
(Scotland) Georgie Rafferty (substituted on) 120'
Manager:
(Scotland) Eddie Wolecki Black

(Scotland) Jenna Fife
(Scotland) Emma Brownlie
(Scotland) Joelle Murray (c)
(Scotland) Siobhan Hunter
(Scotland) Kirsty Smith
(Scotland) Lisa Robertson
(Scotland) Abi Harrison (substituted off) 71'
(Scotland) Lucy Graham
(Scotland) Chloe Arthur
(Scotland) Lizzie Arnot
(Scotland) Heather Richards (substituted off) 96'
Substitutes:
(Scotland) Clare Williamson (substituted on) 71'
(Scotland) Lia Tweedie (substituted on) 96'
Manager:
(Scotland) Chris Roberts
