= Lee Gibson =

Scottish footballer

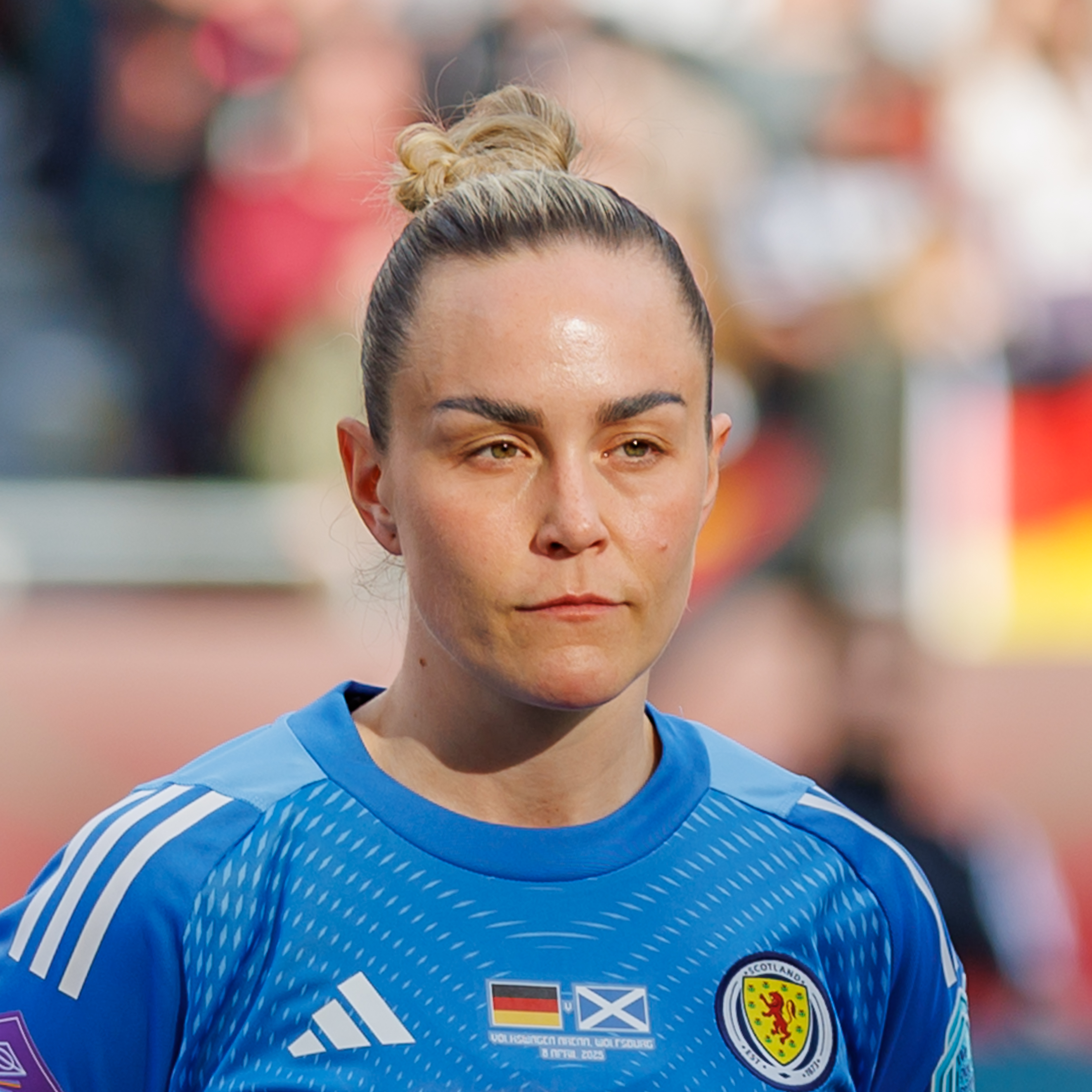
- Gibson lining up for Scotland, 2025

Personal information
- Full name: Lee Helen Gibson
- Date of birth: 23 September 1991 (age 35)
- Place of birth: Rutherglen, Lanarkshire, Scotland
- Height: 1.69 m (5 ft 7 in)
- Position: Goalkeeper

Team information
- Current team: Glasgow City
- Number: 29

Senior career*
Years	Team	Apps	(Gls)
2007–2011	Hamilton Academical	10+	(0)
2011–2015	Glasgow City	32+	(0)
2016	Mallbackens IF	22	(0)
2017–	Glasgow City	57+	(0)

International career^{‡}
2007–2008	Scotland U17	3	(0)
2009–2010	Scotland U19	8	(0)
2017–	Scotland	54	(0)
- * Club domestic league appearances and goals as of 13 February 2025 ‡ National team caps and goals as of 13 February 2025

Lee Helen Gibson (née Alexander; born 23 September 1991) is a Scottish footballer who plays as a goalkeeper for Scottish Women's Premier League club Glasgow City and the Scotland women's national team.

== Early life ==
Gibson was born in Rutherglen and grew up in the Stewartfield area of East Kilbride. She attended Claremont High School.

== Playing career ==
=== Club ===
Gibson played for Glasgow City for five years, winning fourteen trophies including four consecutive domestic trebles, before signing a full-time professional contract with Swedish Damallsvenskan club Mallbackens IF in December 2015. She rejoined Glasgow City in December 2016.

She helped City progress to the quarter-finals of the 2019–20 UEFA Women's Champions League by saving three of four kicks in a penalty shootout against Brondby.

=== International ===
Gibson was first called up to the full Scotland squad in November 2015 for a Euro 2017 qualifying match against Macedonia. Still uncapped, she was named in the Scotland squad for the Euro 2017 finals. Alexander became the first choice goalkeeper for Scotland after Euro 2017, when Gemma Fay retired.

Her international debut came in a 3–0 friendly victory over Hungary in Telki on 14 September 2017, and she helped the team qualify for the 2019 FIFA Women's World Cup. An important moment in the qualifying group was when Gibson saved a penalty kick against Poland. Scotland were eliminated in the group stage of the World Cup, with Gibson playing in all three matches. In the third match, which Scotland had to win to progress, she initially saved a penalty but a retake was ordered by VAR as she had moved her feet off the goal line. The retaken penalty was scored and Scotland, who had led 3–0, could only draw 3–3 with Argentina.

== Personal life ==
She married David Gibson in May 2022, and adopted her husband's name for her next international appearance. The marriage had originally been scheduled for the summer of 2020.

== Career statistics ==
=== International appearances ===
Scotland statistics accurate as of 16 May 2024.

Year	Scotland	
Year	Apps	Goals
2017	3	0
2018	10	0
2019	9	0
2020	5	0
2021	8	0
2022	7	0
2023	10	0
2024	2	0
Total	54	0

== Honours ==
Glasgow City

- Scottish Women's Premier League (10): 2011, 2012, 2013, 2014, 2015, 2017, 2018, 2019, 2020–21, 2022–23
- Scottish Women's Cup (5): 2012, 2013, 2014, 2015, 2019
- Scottish Women's Premier League Cup (4): 2012, 2013, 2014, 2015
