= Amy McDonald (Scottish footballer) =

Scottish footballer and coach

Personal information
- Date of birth: 17 October 1985 (age 41)
- Place of birth: Rutherglen, Scotland
- Positions: Central defender; midfielder

Youth career
- East Kilbride

Senior career*
Years	Team	Apps	(Gls)
2001–2005	Hamilton Athletic		
2005–2007	Kilmarnock		
2007–2008	Queen's Park		
2008–2009	Kilmarnock		
2009–2011	Celtic	6+	(0+)
2011–2012	Glasgow City	10	(1)

International career
2002–2003	Scotland U19		
2004–2009	Scotland	30	(0)

Managerial career
- 2012–2017: Glasgow City (youth)
- 2017–2019: Rangers
- * Club domestic league appearances and goals

Amy McDonald (born 17 October 1985) is a Scottish football coach and former player for the Scotland national team as well as Hamilton Athletic, Kilmarnock, Queen's Park, Celtic and Glasgow City in the Scottish Women's Premier League.

After working in youth development at Glasgow City, in May 2017 she became the head coach of Rangers Women, moving to a role as overall manager of the women's section of the club in 2019; she left this role in 2023.

== Playing career ==
=== Club ===
Born in Rutherglen and a pupil at Stonelaw High School in the town, McDonald emerged as a central defender or defensive midfielder. Her progression into elite football coincided with the introduction of the new Scottish Women's Premier League. She spent time as a youth with East Kilbride (recruited initially as a goalkeeper) and began her senior career with Hamilton Athletic.

In 2005, McDonald moved to Kilmarnock. In May 2006 she played a pivotal role in Killie winning the Scottish Women's Premier League Cup 3–2 against Glasgow City, scoring in the first half of the final and deputising as goalkeeper for the entire second half due to an injury, keeping a clean sheet.

In summer 2007, 21-year-old McDonald signed for newly-promoted Queen's Park and in November captained the team in another SWPL Cup final, which this time ended with a defeat to Hibernian; at the end of the season the Queen's Park squad (including future international Jen Beattie) broke up and the club resigned from the league, with McDonald rejoining Kilmarnock for 2008–09.

In summer 2009, Celtic secured McDonald's services for their third campaign in the SWPL, immediately installing her as captain. The Hoops, who also brought in Scotland players Gemma Fay and Suzanne Grant to strengthen their squad, finished runners-up in both the 2009 and 2010 seasons (the league having transitioned from a winter to a summer schedule), and defeated Rangers 8–0 in the inaugural fixture between the rivals, with McDonald among the scorers. In May 2010 Celtic secured a first major trophy in the women's game by winning the SWPL Cup, McDonald lifting the trophy after a 4–1 win over Spartans. However her form fluctuated and she took a break from football to deal with personal issues going into the following season, and in June 2011 she was released by Celtic.

A short time later, 25-year-old McDonald was acquired by reigning Scottish champions Glasgow City. She featured in most of the remaining games in the 2011 Scottish Women's Premier League (which ended with a fifth successive title and a perfect season for the club), but did not make the squad for the final of the 2011 Scottish Women's Cup. She made one substitute appearance for City in the Champions League, scoring an own goal in a club record 0–10 defeat against Potsdam.

The 2012 season proved to be McDonald's last as a player. Having made six appearances for Glasgow City at the start of the campaign, she suffered a serious ankle ligament injury in a cup game against Aberdeen on 15 April 2012. She was an unused substitute in the 2012 SWPL Cup final which Glasgow City won as part of a treble, but despite her best efforts and several operations, she was unable to fully recover to play competitively again, bowing out at the age of just 26. (Note: Soccerway credits 2 appearances and 2 goals in mid-2012 to Amy, but these should be attributed to striker Ashley McDonald (also born in 1985) who signed for Glasgow City shortly after Amy's injury.) It was also a blow to the club, as manager Eddie Wolecki Black had commented on her arrival that he expected McDonald to be "An integral part of the team for years to come"; however she was an active member of the squad for less than a year before being forced to quit.

=== International ===
After being part of the various age-group squads in her formative years, McDonald earned 30 full caps for Scotland between 2004 and 2009, as well as being a member of the squad for many other fixtures. Her final appearance came in September 2009 against Switzerland.

While playing for Hamilton, Kilmarnock and Queen's Park she was usually the only representative of each club selected for national squads; she stated that she chose to sign for the weaker SWPL clubs in the early part of her career as she would be more likely to play regularly, and to find herself having to deal with more challenging defensive situations.

== Coaching career ==
McDonald had gained qualifications and work experience in sports coaching and had shown enthusiasm and aptitude for coaching since joining Glasgow City, so when forced to retire from playing she was invited to take up a voluntary role with the club overseeing their youth system; she was presented with an SFA Grassroots Award for her efforts as a volunteer. In July 2014 this was made a full-time position, working under the club manager Laura Montgomery, with McDonald also completing her UEFA A Licence during the period. In the 2015 season, each of the Glasgow City age-group teams under her charge reached the final of their respective Scottish Cup. She also became involved with coaching the Scotland Under-15 squad.

On 3 May 2017 McDonald was appointed as the head coach of SWPL club Rangers W.F.C., following on from Kevin Murphy who had moved to Manchester City W.F.C. at the end of the 2016 season. Her first game in charge was against one of her former clubs, Hamilton Accies, who had been coached by Murphy during McDonald's playing spell there. Rangers achieved a 4–0 victory.

in July 2019, McDonald moved to a role as the overall manager of the women's section at Rangers after the club announced a programme of increased investment; Grégory Vignal was appointed as head coach for the senior team. She remained in this role throughout Malky Thomson's tenure as coach (during which the club won the 2021–22 Scottish Women's Premier League to end Glasgow City's long run of titles, and also claimed a first SWPL Cup later that year) but left the club soon after overseeing the appointment of new coach Jo Potter in July 2023.

== Personal life ==
In 2006, McDonald graduated from the University of the West of Scotland (via Glasgow College of Nautical Studies) with a BA degree in Sport studies. Prior to becoming a full-time football coach she also worked in the social care sector with the charity Quarriers and as a sports instructor with Glasgow Life (an agency of Glasgow City Council).

She is a keen user of social media, and during her time at Glasgow City was quick to comment on issues in Scottish football which she perceived as misogynistic or homophobic.

== Managerial statistics ==
As of 8 July 2019 (end of head coach role)

Team	Nat	From	To	Record				
Team	Nat	From	To	G	W	D	L	Win %
Rangers Women	(Scotland)	3 May 2017	8 July 2019	58	24	4	30	41.38
Total				58	24	4	30	41.38
