= 2014 Scottish Women's Cup =

Tournament details
- Country: Scotland

Final positions
- Champions: Glasgow City
- Runners-up: Spartans

The 2014 SWF Scottish Cup was the 43rd official edition (45th overall) of the main national cup competition in Scottish women's football. All teams in the Scottish Women's Football League and Premier League were eligible to enter. 67 teams entered the cup; SWPL sides only enter the second round.

== Preliminary round ==
Draw was between 55 teams, 30 teams drawn to play in the preliminary round, 25 teams drew a bye to the first round. Played 20 April 2014.

Paisley Saints	1–5	Falkirk Ladies
Hibernian Development	6–0	Leith Athletic
Dunfermline Athletic 2013	0–6	Glasgow Girls
East Fife	13–2	East Fife Violet
Claremont	14–0	Raith Rovers
Queen of the South	0–0 aet (4–3 pen)	Aberdeen Development
Heart of Midlothian Development	5–1	Luthermuir
Mill United	5–1	Dee Vale
Kilmarnock	4–4 aet (2–4 pen)	Cumbernauld Colts
Falkirk FC	5–0	Bishopton
Elgin City	5–1	Castlemilk East
Buchan Ladies Youth	0–7	Dunfermline Athletic
Cowdenbeath	2–1	Tayside Ladies
Partick Thistle	2–5	Kemnay
Falkirk Ladies Reserves	5–2	Hutchison Vale Reserves

== First round ==
15 winners from the preliminary round joined 25 teams with a bye. Played 18 May 2014, with Celtic 20s postponed to 28 May 14.

Livingston	1–6	Glasgow Girls
Dunfermline Athletic	17–0	Boroughmuir Jags
Heart of Midlothian	8–1	Kemnay
Fairfield	0–32	Cowdenbeath
Stonehaven	8–1	Caithness Ladies
Kirkintilloch Rob Roy	0–10	Jeanfield Swifts
Spartans Reserves	12–0	Forfar Farmington Ladies
Riverside	3–0	Stranraer
Elgin City	1–12	Falkirk Ladies
Aberdeen Reserves	4–0	Edinburgh Caledonia
Seton Ladies	0–14	Boroughmuir Thistle
Heart of Midlothian Development	7–0	Turriff United
Edinburgh South	4–2	Queen of the South
Dee Ladies	1–3	Murieston United
Falkirk FC	3–0	Falkirk Ladies Reserves
Motherwell	0–3	Claremont
Mill United	4–2	East Fife
Hibernian Development	7–0	Hamilton Caledonian
Dundee City	3–4	Renfrew
Celtic 20s	1–0	Cumbernauld Colts

== Second round ==
20 winners from the first round join the twelve Scottish Women's Premier League teams that enter this round. Played 22 June 2014.

Mill United	1–8	Hibernian
Claremont	2–9	Forfar Farmington
Queen's Park	2–5	Renfrew
Dunfermline Athletic	1–6	Aberdeen
Inverness City	10–0	Spartans Reserves
Glasgow City	2–0	Celtic
Celtic 20s	4–1	Murieston United
Cowdenbeath	w/o	Spartans
Jeanfield Swifts	1–2	Boroughmuir Thistle
Aberdeen Reserves	6–2	Stonehaven
Heart of Midlothian Development	0–2	Glasgow Girls
Edinburgh South	4–5	Falkirk FC
Hutchison Vale	15–0	Riverside
Hamilton Academical	3–1	Hibernian Development
Buchan Ladies	2–3	Falkirk Ladies
Rangers	12–0	Heart of Midlothian

== Third round ==
Played on 17 August 2014.

Glasgow City	7–0	Celtic 20s
Aberdeen	w/o	Renfrew
Glasgow Girls	0–3	Hamilton Academical
Forfar Farmington	2–5	Spartans
Inverness City	7–1	Boroughmuir Thistle
Falkirk F.C.	0–22	Rangers
Hutchison Vale	1–3	Falkirk L.F.C.
Hibernian	w/o	Aberdeen Reserves

== Quarter-finals ==
Falkirk is the only non-Premier League team remaining. Played 28 September 2014.

Spartans	5–0	Inverness City
Glasgow City	11–0	Hamilton Academical W.F.C.
Falkirk L.F.C.	1–6	Hibernian
Aberdeen	2–1 a.e.t.	Rangers

== Semi-finals ==
19 October 2014	Hibernian	0–4	Glasgow City	Motherwell
			Lappin 10' 67'; Marlborough 40'; S. Fairlie 90+2'	Stadium: Ravenscraig Regional Sports Facility

19 October 2014	Spartans	4–1	Aberdeen	Motherwell
	Clelland 43'; Ewens 49' 85'; C. Crosbie 82'		Small 9'	Stadium: Ravenscraig Regional Sports Facility

== Final ==
Holders Glasgow City won their third national treble in a row.

16 November 2014

Glasgow City	5–0	Spartans
Brown 26' 67'; O'Sullivan 45+2'; Love 78' 85'

Broadwood Stadium, Cumbernauld
Attendance: 525
Referee: Vikki Robertson

Glasgow City	Spartans

25	(Australia) Niki Deiter
15	(Scotland) Emma Black
5	(Scotland) Eilish McSorley
14	(Scotland) Cheryl McCulloch
16	(Scotland) Leanne Ross (c)
6	(Scotland) Jo Love
7	(Republic of Ireland) Denise O'Sullivan
17	(Scotland) Fiona Brown
20	(Scotland) Susan Fairlie
18	(Scotland) Abbi Grant
10	(Scotland) Suzanne Lappin
Substitutes:
21	(Scotland) Autumn Farrell
2	(Scotland) Lauren McMurchie
9	(Scotland) Carla Boyce
11	(Scotland) Nicola Docherty
13	(Scotland) Courtney Whyte
23	(Northern Ireland) Julie Nelson
24	(United States) Morgan Marlborough
Manager:
(Scotland) Eddie Wolecki Black

1	(Scotland) Rachel Harrison
21	(Scotland) Suzy Shepherd
17	(Scotland) Katie Reilly (c)
5	(Scotland) Claire Crosbie
7	(Scotland) Kirsty McLaughlin
25	(Northern Ireland) Kerry Montgomery
24	(Scotland) Danni Pagliarulo
11	(Scotland) Alana Marshall
16	(Scotland) Lana Clelland
22	(Scotland) Steph Briggs
19	(Scotland) Sarah Ewens
Substitutes:
2	(Scotland) Ashley Nicolson
3	(Scotland) Ciara Barnes
4	(Scotland) Trisha McLaughlin
6	(Scotland) Bobbie Beveridge
8	(Scotland) Christie Kerr
15	(Scotland) Louise Mason
23	(Scotland) Natasha McMahon
Manager:
(Scotland) Debbi McCulloch
