= Abbi Grant =

Scottish footballer (born 1995)

Personal information
- Date of birth: 11 December 1995 (age 30)
- Place of birth: Dundee, Scotland
- Position: Forward

Senior career*
Years	Team	Apps	(Gls)
–2011	Rangers	1	(0)
2012–2013	Forfar Farmington	34	(11)
2014–2015	Glasgow City		
2016	Hibernian		
2016	Celtic		
2017–2019	Glasgow City		(15)
2019	Anderlecht	12	(8)
2019–2021	Birmingham City	15	(2)
2021–2022	Leicester City	1	(0)
2022	→ Glasgow City (loan)	1	(2)
2022–2023	Glasgow City	17	(4)
2024	Panathinaikos	9	(2)
2024–2026	Durham W.F.C.	2	(0)

International career^{‡}
2009	Scotland U15	1	(1)
2010–2012	Scotland U17	14	(5)
2012–2014	Scotland U19	22	(2)
2018–2022	Scotland	7	(2)
- * Club domestic league appearances and goals as of 1 July 2026 ‡ National team caps and goals as of 4 June 2022

Abbi Grant (born 11 December 1995) is a Scottish footballer who plays as a forward. Grant has previously played for various clubs in Scotland, Belgium, Greece and England, and represented the Scotland national team.

== Club career ==
On 13 March 2012, Grant left Rangers to join Forfar Farmington. On 13 February 2014, after two years with Forfar, Grant signed with Glasgow City. She moved to Hibernian in 2015. She also played for Celtic before being re-signed by Glasgow City in 2016.

Grant signed for Belgian club Anderlecht in January 2019 and went on to win the Belgian Super League.

Grant then signed for Birmingham City in the FA Women's Super League on a two-year deal in July 2019. Birmingham City head coach Marta Tejedor welcomed Grant as a "valuable acquisition". Tejedor added: "Abbi is a young and talented player who will give speed and versatility to our attack in different positions of the field."

On 21 July 2021, Grant signed for Leicester City ahead of their first WSL season. She returned to Glasgow City for a third time in January 2022, on loan until the end of the season.

On 4 June 2024, the forwared signed for Women's Super League 2 club Durham ahead of the 2024–25 season, having previously played for Greek A Division side Panathinaikos.

== International career ==
In February 2018, Grant received her first senior call-up by the Scotland national team. On 6 March 2018, she made her senior debut in a 2–0 victory over New Zealand. Grant made her first senior level competitive appearance during Euro 2021 qualifying, in an 8–0 victory over Cyprus at Easter Road on 30 September 2019. She scored her first international goal during the 2020 Pinatar Cup, in a 1–0 victory against Iceland.

== International goals ==
No.	Date	Venue	Opponent	Score	Result	Competition
1.	7 March 2020	Pinatar Arena, San Pedro del Pinatar, Spain	Iceland	1–0	1–0	2020 Pinatar Cup
2.	10 March 2020	Pinatar Arena, San Pedro del Pinatar, Spain	Northern Ireland	2–1	2–1	2020 Pinatar Cup

== Honours ==
=== Club ===
Glasgow City

- Scottish Women's Premier League: 2014, 2015, 2017, 2018
- Scottish Women's Cup: 2014, 2015
- Scottish Women's Premier League Cup: 2015

RSC Anderlecht

- Belgian Women's Super League: 2018–19

=== Individual ===
- SWPL Player of the Month: November 2017, August 2018
