= Heather Richards =

Scottish footballer (born 1994)

Personal information
- Date of birth: 16 February 1994 (age 32)
- Place of birth: Scotland,
- Position: Forward

Team information
- Current team: Hamilton Academical

Senior career*
Years	Team	Apps	(Gls)
2011	Rangers		
2012–2014	Celtic	56	(10)
2015–2016	Hibernian		
2016–2018	Celtic	29	(1)
2020–	Hamilton Academical	0	(0)

International career
2014–2015	Scotland	4	(0)
- * Club domestic league appearances and goals

Heather Richards (born 16 February 1994) is a Scottish football forward who plays for Hamilton Academical of the Scottish Women's Premier League (SWPL).

== Club career ==
Coming from Rangers, Richards transferred to Celtic in December 2011, where she stayed three years. In December 2014 she transferred from Celtic to Hibernian, scoring from close to the halfway line in the 2015 SWPL Cup final, before returning to Celtic during the 2016 mid-season break. Resuming her football career after a long break, she was one of five new signings for Hamilton Academical in January 2020.

== International career ==
Richards made her 'A' international debut for Scotland on 12 March 2014 against Korea Republic, replacing Lisa Evans in the 89th minute. She also represented Scotland at under-17 and under-19 level.
