= Katharina Lindner =

German footballer and academic (1979–2019)

Personal information
- Date of birth: 3 September 1979
- Place of birth: Munich, West Germany
- Date of death: 9 February 2019 (aged 39)
- Height: 5 ft 5 in (1.65 m)
- Position: Striker

Youth career
- 1999–2002: Hartford Hawks

Senior career*
Years	Team	Apps	(Gls)
1996–1999	1. FFC Frankfurt		
2004	Western Mass Lady Pioneers		
2005–2011	Glasgow City		
- * Club domestic league appearances and goals

Katharina Lindner (3 September 1979 – 9 February 2019) was a German academic and a footballer who played as a striker for Glasgow City F.C. from 2005 to 2011. She was also a lecturer at the University of Stirling on gender, sports, queer theory, and how women's images are presented in the media.

== Sports career ==
Lindner grew up in Kleinostheim and joined 1. FFC Frankfurt (then known as SG Praunheim) as a 16 year old. She won a double with Frankfurt in 1999 before accepting a scholarship in America. While attending the University of Hartford in 2000, Lindner was named an NSCAA 1st Team All-American.

Lindner joined Glasgow City in 2005 after moving to Scotland to complete a PhD in film studies. During her time with the team, Glasgow City won five Scottish Women's Premier League titles, two Scottish Women's Cups and two Scottish Women's Premier League Cups. Lindner scored 128 goals for the team in 173 appearances with the team.

When Lindner announced plans to retire from football ahead of the 2011 Scottish Women's Cup final, Glasgow City manager Eddie Wolecki-Black paid tribute to her contribution: "Kat, few would argue, is without doubt one of the finest players ever to play in Scotland and it has been a pleasure working with such a committed and talented athlete. She will be a big loss to our attacking options."

== Academic career ==
Lindner was a lecturer in the Communication, Media & Culture of University of Stirling, focusing on gender, sports and queer theory. She wrote several articles published in academic journals such as Sex Roles and Feminist Media Studies. In her most-cited work, "Images of Women in General Interest and Fashion Magazine Advertisements from 1955 to 2002", Lindner "adapted a set of qualitative criteria from Erving Goffman’s classic work on the subtle cues contained within advertising" to analyse how women are objectified in advertisements in women's fashion magazines compared to general interest magazines. In 2016, she also wrote an op-ed for The Conversation (reprinted in The Independent) in support of boycotting the Oscars. In October 2017, Lindner published Film Bodies: Queer Feminist Encounters with Gender and Sexuality in Cinema via I.B. Tauris.

== Personal life ==
Lindner died on 9 February 2019. Glasgow City announced that the team would postpone their season opening game while they mourned her death. Lindner's partner, Scottish footballer Laura Montgomery, is a co-founder of the club.

== Death ==
Lindner took her own life in hospital, having been admitted following a previous suicide attempt the preceding week. She had depression.
