= Martha Thomas (footballer) =

Scottish footballer (born 1996)

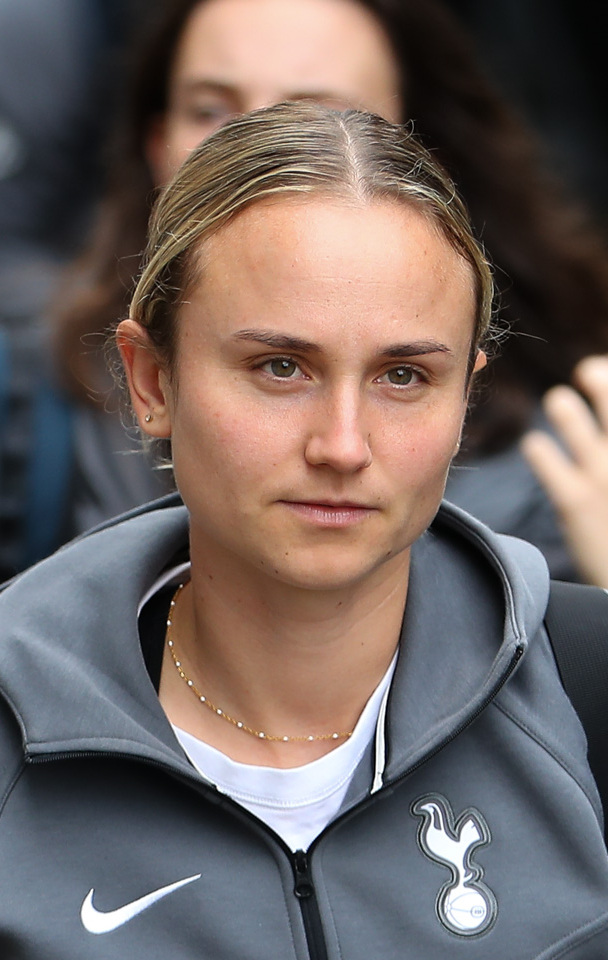
- Thomas with Tottenham Hotspur in 2024

Personal information
- Full name: Martha Ellen Thomas
- Date of birth: 31 May 1996 (age 30)
- Place of birth: Malmesbury, Wiltshire, England
- Height: 5 ft 7 in (1.70 m)
- Position: Striker

Team information
- Current team: Newcastle United

Youth career
- Dorchester Town
- Weston FC

College career
Years	Team	Apps	(Gls)
2014–2017	Charlotte 49ers	78	(47)

Senior career*
Years	Team	Apps	(Gls)
2018–2019	Le Havre	13	(6)
2019–2021	West Ham United	26	(8)
2021–2023	Manchester United	38	(6)
2023–2026	Tottenham Hotspur	51	(8)
2026	→ Liverpool (loan)	6	(1)
2026–	Newcastle United	0	(0)

International career^{‡}
2020–	Scotland	54	(21)
- * Club domestic league appearances and goals as of 07:34, 29 March 2026 (UTC) ‡ National team caps and goals as of 20:40, 15 October 2026 (UTC)

Martha Ellen Thomas (born 31 May 1996) is a professional footballer who plays as a striker for Women's Super League 2 club Newcastle United. Born in England and raised mainly in the United States, she plays for the Scotland national team. Thomas played four years of college soccer for Charlotte 49ers before playing professionally with French Division 2 Féminine club Le Havre, West Ham United in 2019 and Manchester United of the English Women's Super League in 2021.

== Early life ==
Thomas was born in Malmesbury, Wiltshire, to a Scottish mother, Christine, and English father, Andrew. She grew up in Dorchester until 2001 when the family moved to Atlanta, when her father got a job in the United States. They briefly returned to Dorchester in 2003 where Thomas played for Dorchester Town for a season before once again relocating to the States, this time to Weston, Florida, at the age of six. While in Weston, she played for youth club Weston FC.

== College career ==
Thomas played college soccer for Charlotte 49ers, captaining the team for two seasons. In her first year, Thomas led the team in goals with 11 and was voted Conference USA Freshman of the Year. The following three years, Thomas was selected to the All-Conference USA First Team as well as being voted as the league's Offensive Player of the Year in 2016 and 2017. Upon leaving, Thomas ranked as the school's all-time leading goalscorer with 47. She was also named team MVP in each of her four seasons.

== Club career ==
Thomas had hoped to enter the 2018 NWSL College Draft in January 2018, but suffered an ACL injury in her final appearance for the 49ers in November 2017. Having rehabbed, Thomas belatedly began her professional career with Le Havre AC in the French Division 2, signing for the club in August 2018. She made her debut on 21 October 2018, starting in a 1–0 defeat to Stade de Reims. She scored 6 goals in 13 league appearances as Le Havre finished second.

On 16 July 2019, Thomas signed for West Ham United of the FA WSL, taking the number 9 shirt following the departure of Jane Ross. Thomas started and scored on her debut, the season opener as West Ham lost 2–1 away to reigning champions Arsenal on 8 September 2019. She scored her first career hat-trick during the first half of a 5–0 win against Reading on 3 April 2021. On 21 May 2021, it was confirmed Thomas would leave West Ham after two seasons following the expiration of her contract.

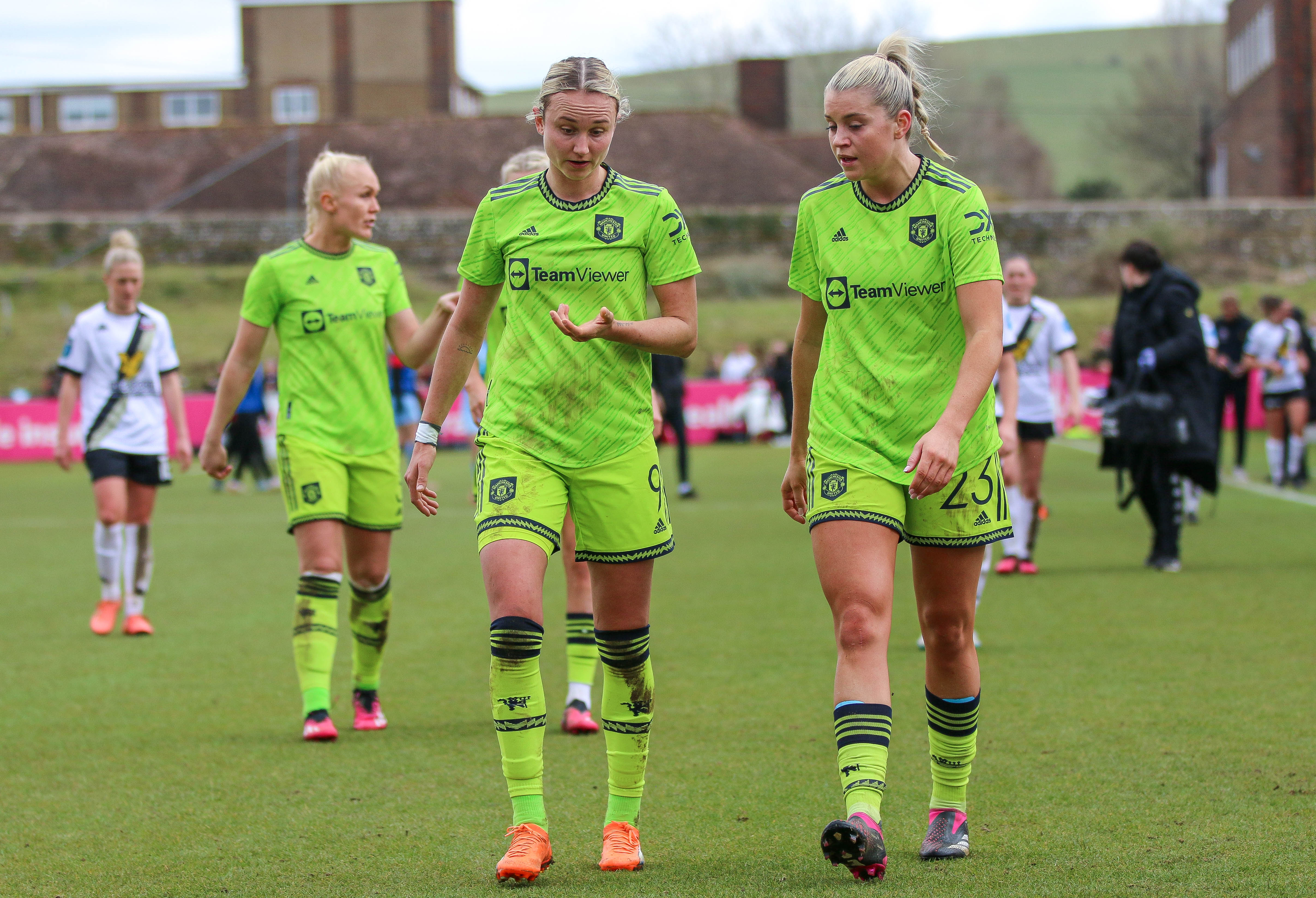
Thomas (centre) with Manchester United teammate Alessia Russo (right), playing against Lewes, March 2023

On 28 July 2021, Thomas signed for Manchester United on a two-year deal with the option of an additional year.

On 14 September 2023, Thomas signed a two-year deal with Tottenham Hotspur. She scored on her debut in a 2–1 away defeat to Chelsea on 1 October that year.

On 17 January 2026, Thomas was loaned to Liverpool until the end of the 2025–26 season.

In July 2026, Thomas joined WSL 2 side Newcastle United for an undisclosed fee.

== International career ==
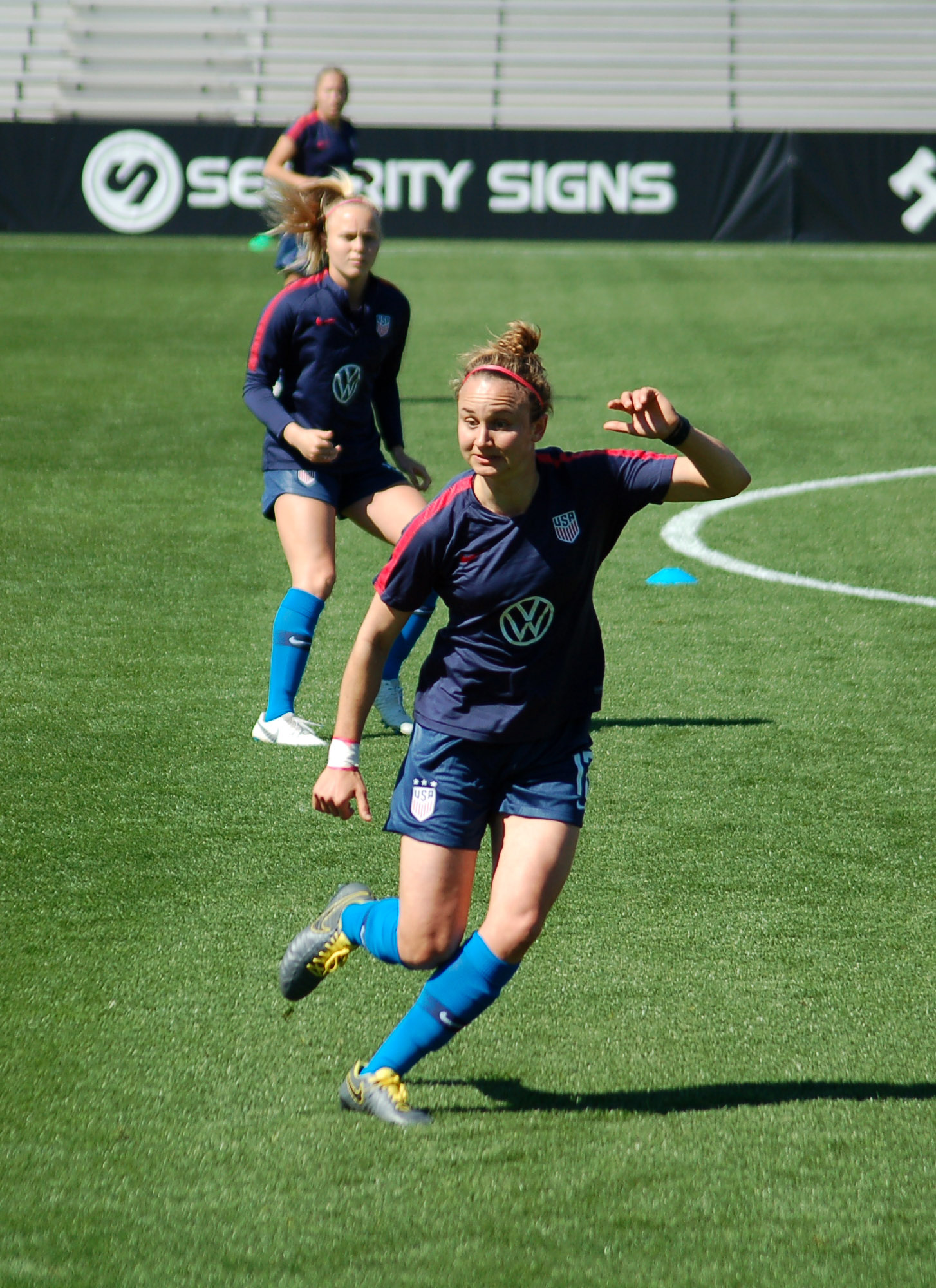
Thomas (front) with the United States U23 team

Thomas represented the United States at youth level, playing for the under-23 team in 2019 at the Portland Thorns Spring Invitational preseason tournament. She had not yet acquired American citizenship, however, making her ineligible to represent the senior team.

Thomas was eligible to represent both England and Scotland at the senior level. In September 2019 she attended a training camp with the Scotland national team. She subsequently received her first call-up to the Scotland squad on 25 October 2019 but was forced to withdraw through injury. She was again selected by Scotland for the 2020 Pinatar Cup and scored two goals as she made her international debut in a 3–0 win against Ukraine on 4 March 2020. Thomas scored another brace in her seventh appearance for Scotland on 19 February 2021 during a 10–0 victory over Cyprus as part of UEFA Euro 2022 qualifying, the first time Scotland had hit double figures since 2015. Despite the emphatic victory, Scotland had already been eliminated from qualification in December 2020.

During UEFA Euro 2025 qualifying, Thomas scored four goals in a 5–0 win against Israel.

== Personal life ==
Thomas' great uncle, Jim Kirkland, also played football professionally for Aberdeen in the Scottish top-flight.

She is in a relationship with fellow footballer Ellie Leek. The two met while both playing for Le Havre. The couple announced their engagement on 22 December 2022, and they were married on 29 December 2024.

She has been a vocal supporter of Stonewall's Rainbow Laces campaign.

== Career statistics ==
=== Club ===
As of match played 5 April 2026

Appearances and goals by club, season and competition
Club	Season	League			National cup		League cup		Total	
Club	Season	Division	Apps	Goals	Apps	Goals	Apps	Goals	Apps	Goals
Le Havre	2018–19	D2 Féminine	13	6	2	0	—		15	6
West Ham United	2019–20	Women's Super League	10	4	0	0	3	1	13	5
West Ham United	2020–21	Women's Super League	16	4	0	0	3	1	19	5
West Ham United	Total		26	8	0	0	6	2	32	10
Manchester United	2021–22	Women's Super League	18	5	2	0	4	1	24	6
Manchester United	2022–23	Women's Super League	20	1	5	0	4	1	29	2
Manchester United	Total		38	6	7	0	8	2	53	8
Tottenham Hotspur	2023–24	Women's Super League	19	7	4	1	4	2	27	10
Tottenham Hotspur	2024–25	Women's Super League	22	0	1	0	3	1	26	1
Tottenham Hotspur	2025–26	Women's Super League	10	1	0	0	3	1	13	2
Tottenham Hotspur	Total		51	8	5	1	10	4	66	13
Liverpool (loan)	2025–26	Women's Super League	6	1	3	1	0	0	9	2
Career total			134	29	17	2	24	8	175	39

=== International ===
As of match played 13 October 2026

Appearances and goals by national team and year
National team	Year	Apps	Goals
Scotland	2020	6	2
Scotland	2021	4	4
Scotland	2022	9	4
Scotland	2023	13	1
Scotland	2024	10	10
Scotland	2025	10	0
Scotland	2026	2	0
Total		54	21

Scores and results list Scotland's goal tally first, score column indicates score after each Thomas goal.

List of international goals scored by Martha Thomas
No.	Date	Venue	Opponent	Score	Result	Competition	Ref.
1	4 March 2020	Pinatar Arena, San Pedro del Pinatar, Spain	Ukraine	1–0	3–0	2020 Pinatar Cup	
2	4 March 2020	Pinatar Arena, San Pedro del Pinatar, Spain	Ukraine	2–0	3–0	2020 Pinatar Cup	
3	19 February 2021	AEK Arena, Larnaca, Cyprus	Cyprus	2–0	10–0	UEFA Euro 2022 qualifying	
4	19 February 2021	AEK Arena, Larnaca, Cyprus	Cyprus	9–0	10–0	UEFA Euro 2022 qualifying	
5	17 September 2021	Hidegkuti Nándor Stadion, Budapest, Hungary	Hungary	2–0	2–0	2023 World Cup qualifying	
6	21 September 2021	Hampden Park, Glasgow, Scotland	Faroe Islands	5–1	7–1	2023 World Cup qualifying	
7	19 February 2022	Pinatar Arena, San Pedro del Pinatar, Spain	Slovakia	2–0	2–0	2022 Pinatar Cup	
8	24 June 2022	Stadion Miejski w Rzeszowie, Rzeszów, Poland	Ukraine	3–0	4–0	2023 World Cup qualifying	
9	24 June 2022	Stadion Miejski w Rzeszowie, Rzeszów, Poland	Ukraine	4–0	4–0	2023 World Cup qualifying	
10	6 September 2022	Tórsvøllur, Tórshavn, Faroe Islands	Faroe Islands	4–0	6–0	2023 World Cup qualifying	
11	14 July 2023	Dens Park, Dundee, Scotland	Northern Ireland	3–0	3–0	Friendly	
12	24 February 2024	Pinatar Arena, San Pedro del Pinatar, Spain	Philippines	1–0	2–0	2024 Pinatar Cup	
13	24 February 2024	Pinatar Arena, San Pedro del Pinatar, Spain	Philippines	2–0	2–0	2024 Pinatar Cup	
14	27 February 2024	Pinatar Arena, San Pedro del Pinatar, Spain	Finland	1–1	1–1	2024 Pinatar Cup	
15	31 May 2024	Hampden Park, Glasgow, Scotland	Israel	4–0	4–1	UEFA Euro 2025 qualifying	
16	4 June 2024	Budaörsi Városi Stadium, Budaörs, Hungary	Israel	1–0	5–0	UEFA Euro 2025 qualifying	
17	4 June 2024	Budaörsi Városi Stadium, Budaörs, Hungary	Israel	2–0	5–0	UEFA Euro 2025 qualifying	
18	4 June 2024	Budaörsi Városi Stadium, Budaörs, Hungary	Israel	3–0	5–0	UEFA Euro 2025 qualifying	
19	4 June 2024	Budaörsi Városi Stadium, Budaörs, Hungary	Israel	4–0	5–0	UEFA Euro 2025 qualifying	
20	25 October 2024	Bozsik Aréna, Budapest, Hungary	Hungary	1–0	1–0	UEFA Euro 2025 qualifying play-offs	
21	29 October 2024	Easter Road, Edinburgh, Scotland	Hungary	4–0	4–0	UEFA Euro 2025 qualifying play-offs	

== Honours ==
Charlotte 49ers

- Conference USA Women's Soccer Tournament: 2016

Manchester United

- Women's FA Cup runner-up: 2022–23

Tottenham Hotspur

- Women's FA Cup runner-up: 2023–24

Scotland

- Pinatar Cup: 2020

Individual

- Conference USA Offensive Player of the Year: 2016, 2017
- Pinatar Cup Top scorer: 2020
- WSL Player of the Month: October 2023
