= 2008–09 Scottish Women's Football League First Division =

Scottish Women's Football League First Division
- Season: 2008–09
- Champions: Rangers
- Promoted: Rangers; Inverness City
- Relegated: Tynecastle; Dumfries
- Matches: 90
- Biggest home win: Celtic II 17–0 Dumfries (23 May 2009)
- Biggest away win: Dumfries 0–13 Falkirk (11 October 2009)
- Highest scoring: Celtic II 17–0 Dumfries (23 May 2009)
- Longest winning run: Rangers (18 games)
- Longest unbeaten run: Rangers (18 games)
- All statistics correct as of 14 October 2022.

The 2008-09 Scottish Women's League First Division was the 9th season of the Scottish Women's Football League First Division. Ten teams contested the league; the champions and runners-up were promoted to the Scottish Women's Premier League to compete in the 2009 season. The bottom two teams were relegated to the Scottish Women's Football League Second Division (East and South West regions) for the following season.

== Clubs ==
Team	Location	Home ground	Capacity	2007–08 position	source
Bo'ness United	Bo'ness	The Murries		8th	
Celtic II	Glasgow			1st (Division 2)	
Cowdenbeath	Cowdenbeath	Lochgelly High School		5th	
Dumfries	Dumfries			9th	
Falkirk	Falkirk	Westfield Park, Denny		6th	
Glasgow Ladies	Glasgow			11th (SWPL) (as Vale of Clyde)	(Note: Results on Soccerway for Glasgow Ladies linked to Glasgow City II profile in error, other seasons for Vale of Clyde located at separate profile.)
Hutchison Vale	Edinburgh	Arboretum Road		4th	
Inverness City	Inverness	Bught Park		3rd	
Rangers	Glasgow			7th (as Paisley City Saints)	
Tynecastle	Edinburgh	Saughton Park		2nd (Division 2)	

== Results ==
Home \ Away	BON	CEL	COW	DUM	FAL	GLA	HUT	INV	RAN	TYN
Bo'ness United		1–2	1–4	5–2	0–1	0–4	1–5	1–3	0–6	1–5
Celtic II	9–0		4–1	17–0	3–0	4–0	7–1	1–5	0–2	2–1
Cowdenbeath	1–2	2–1		11–2	3–2	2–1	1–0	1–5	0–6	4–2
Dumfries	4–0	1–6	4–5		0–13	2–5	2–6	1–10	0–8	2–1
Falkirk	7–0	1–6	4–5	0–13		2–5	2–6	2–4	2–4	8–2
Glasgow Ladies	6–0	2–1	3–1	5–0	1–6		0–1	2–2	0–1	2–6
Hutchison Vale	1–1	2–1	2–0	2–0	0–1	1–2		0–11	0–1	2–6
Inverness City	3–0	2–2	7–1	13–0	2–1	8–3	5–1		2–4	7–1
Rangers	6–0	2–1	3–0	14–1	8–2	4–1	5–2	3–2		9–0
Tynecastle	2–0	0–2	2–3	8–4	0–8	2–2	1–2	1–6	0–4	

Legend: Blue = home team win; Yellow = draw; Red = away team win.

== Final league table ==
Pos	Team	Pld	W	D	L	GF	GA	GD	Pts	
1	Rangers	18	18	0	0	89	12	77	54	Champions, promoted to 2009 SWPL
2	Inverness City	18	14	2	2	97	25	72	44	Promoted to 2009 SWPL
3	Falkirk	18	13	0	5	74	28	46	39	
4	Celtic II	18	11	1	6	67	24	43	34	
5	Cowdenbeath	18	8	0	10	38	53	15	24	
6	Glasgow Ladies	18	7	2	9	42	40	2	23	
7	Hutchison Vale	18	7	1	10	29	47	-18	22	
8	Tynecastle	18	4	1	13	34	71	-37	13	Relegated to 2009 SWFL Division 2 South East
9	Bo'ness United	18	2	1	15	13	71	-37	7	Left the League
10	Dumfries	18	2	0	16	25	137	-112	6	Relegated to 2009 SWFL Division 2 South West

== Positions by round ==
Champions; promoted to Scottish Women's Premier League
promoted to Scottish Women's Premier League
Relegation to 2020 Scottish Women's League Division 2 South East
Relegation to 2020 Scottish Women's League Division 2 South West

The table lists the positions of teams after each week of matches. In order to preserve chronological progress, any postponed matches are not included in the round at which they were originally scheduled but added to the full round they were played immediately afterwards. For example, if a match is scheduled for matchday 13, but then postponed and played between days 16 and 17, it will be added to the standings for day 16.

Team ╲ Round	1	2	3	4	5	6	7	8	9	10	11	12	13	14	15	16	17	18
Bo'ness United	9	9	6	9	9	8	9	9	9	9	9	9	9	9	9	9	9	9
Celtic II	7	1	2	1	1	1	1	3	4	4	4	4	4	4	4	4	4	4
Cowdenbeath	5	5	7	7	5	6	5	5	7	7	6	5	5	5	6	6	6	5
Dumfries	10	10	10	10	10	10	10	10	10	10	10	10	10	10	10	10	10	10
Falkirk	8	8	4	4	4	4	4	4	2	2	3	3	3	3	3	3	3	3
Glasgow Ladies	4	6	8	5	7	5	7	7	6	6	7	7	7	6	5	5	5	6
Hutchison Vale	2	7	9	6	6	7	6	6	5	5	5	6	6	7	7	7	7	7
Inverness City	6	3	3	3	3	3	3	2	3	3	2	2	2	2	2	2	2	2
Rangers	1	2	1	2	2	2	2	1	1	1	1	1	1	1	1	1	1	1
Tynecastle	3	4	5	8	8	9	8	8	8	8	8	8	8	8	8	8	8	8
