= Julie Nelson (footballer) =

Northern Irish footballer (born 1985)

Julie Nelson BEM
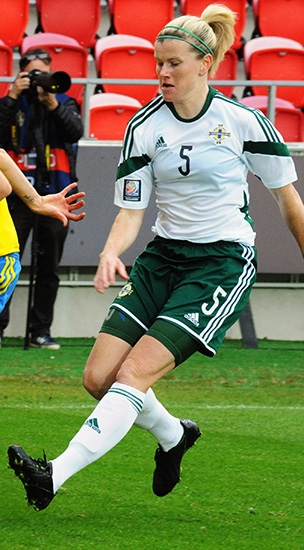
- Julie Nelson in 2014

Personal information
- Full name: Julie Nelson
- Date of birth: 4 June 1985 (age 41)
- Place of birth: Northern Ireland
- Height: 1.77 m (5 ft 10 in)
- Position: Defender

Team information
- Current team: Crusaders Strikers
- Number: 15

Senior career*
Years	Team	Apps	(Gls)
2002–2010	Crusaders Strikers		
2011–2012	ÍBV	35	(2)
2013	Everton Ladies	3	(0)
2013–2014	Glasgow City	9	(0)
2015–2016	Durham Women		
2016–present	Crusaders Strikers		

International career^{‡}
2004–	Northern Ireland	126	(9)
- * Club domestic league appearances and goals as of 23:34, 24 October 2015 (UTC) ‡ National team caps and goals as of 22:55, 13 July 2022 (UTC)

Julie Elizabeth Nelson BEM (born 4 June 1985) is an association football defender from Northern Ireland who plays for Crusaders Strikers. She represents Northern Ireland nationally as the record cap player.

== Club career ==
Nelson played for Crusaders Newtownabbey Strikers from 2002 to 2010, with whom she won multiple championships and took part in 2010–11 UEFA Champions League qualifiers. She scored her team's only goal in the tournament in a 6–1 draw against FCR 2001 Duisburg. After stints in Iceland, England, and Scotland, where she won further trophies with Glasgow City F.C. and reached the last 16 and quarter-finals of the 2013–14 and 2014–15 UEFA Champions League, she returned to the Crusaders in 2016. She previously played for Durham, Everton, and ÍBV.

== International career ==
Nelson made her international debut during the 2004 Algarve Cup. Northern Ireland qualified for the 2011 World Cup in third place behind France and Iceland, 13 points behind Iceland. Nelson was used in all ten games and didn't miss a minute. In qualifying for the 2013 Euro, they got fourth place. This time, too, she didn't miss a minute. She scored two goals in ten games. Qualifying for the 2015 World Cup, she played for Northern Ireland in all ten games of which only the last was won against the Faroe Islands, and again not missing a minute. They also qualified for the 2017 Euro, this time winning both games against Georgia. Nelson played in the eight games and again didn't miss a minute.

In qualifying for the 2019 World Cup, Nelson was in the starting XI seven times and came on as a substitute once. On September 4, 2018, she made her 100th appearance for Northern Ireland, becoming the first player to reach that landmark. Nelson was awarded the British Empire Medal (BEM) in the 2021 Birthday Honours for services to women's football.

In qualifying for Euro 2022, Northern Ireland finished second behind Norway, ahead of Wales who tied on points. They drew 2–2 in Wales and ended the home game goalless, allowing them to win the tied draw on away goals. In the playoffs, they prevailed with two victories (2-1 and 2–0) against Ukraine, who are higher in the FIFA world rankings, and qualified for a major football tournament for the first time. Nelson played in all ten games and didn't miss a minute. In the first game of Group A on July 7, 2022, in Southampton, she scored the first goal for the Northern Ireland national team in a major women's football tournament by scoring in the 49th minute in a 4–1 defeat by the Norwegian national team. With the same goal, Nelson also became the oldest woman to score in history of the Euros at 37 years and 33 days.

Nelson was part of the squad that was called up to the UEFA Women's Euro 2022.

In the first eight matches of the qualification for the World Cup 2023, she played in all the games except the second match against the national team of Latvia.

== Managing ==
Nelson is interim manager for the U-17 Northern Ireland national team. She took over for Noel Mitchell in February 2023, while still playing on the senior Northern Ireland team.

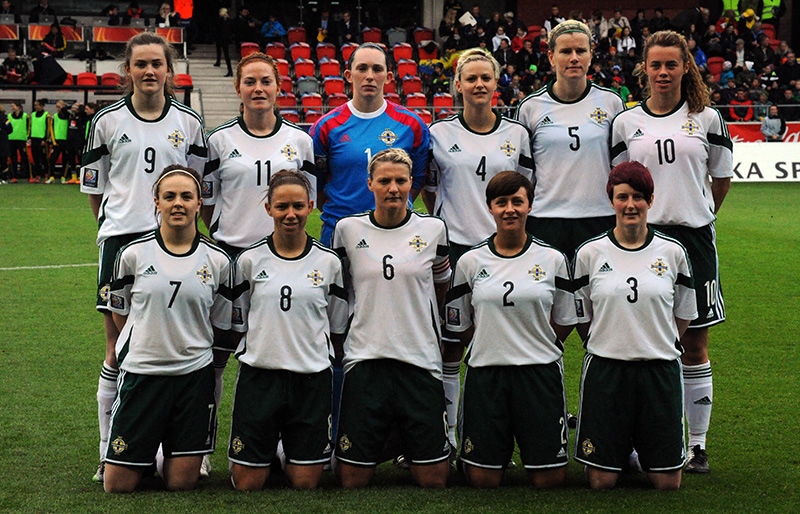
Northern Ireland team before the game against Sweden in May 2014, Nelson in the back second from right (number 5)

== Honours ==
with Glasgow City

- Scottish Women's Premier League: 2013, 2014
- Scottish Women's Cup (2): 2013, 2014
- Scottish Women's Premier League Cup: 2014

with Íþróttabandalag Vestmannaeyja

- Úrvalsdeild runner-up: 2012

with Crusaders Strikers

- Women's Premier League: 2002, 2003, 2005, 2009, 2010
