= Fiona Brown (footballer) =

Scottish footballer (born 1995)

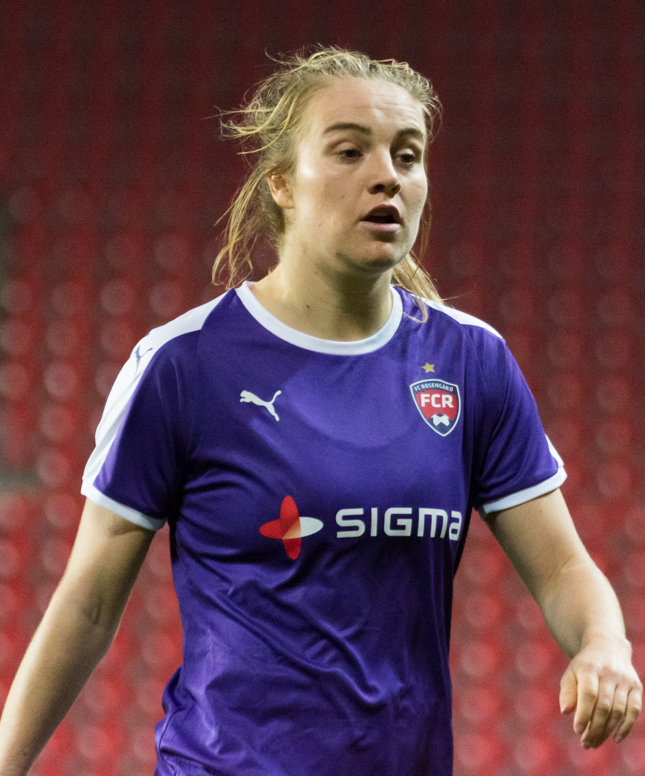
- Brown in 2018 with FC Rosengård

Personal information
- Full name: Fiona Alison Brown
- Date of birth: 31 March 1995 (age 31)
- Place of birth: Stirling, Scotland
- Height: 1.65 m (5 ft 5 in)
- Position: Forward

Senior career*
Years	Team	Apps	(Gls)
2009–2013	Celtic	36	(29)
2014–2016	Glasgow City		
2017	Eskilstuna United	22	(3)
2018–2023	FC Rosengård	51	(8)
2024–2025	Glasgow City	8	(4)

International career^{‡}
2009	Scotland U16	1	(0)
2010–2011	Scotland U17	13	(2)
2012–2014	Scotland U19	15	(1)
2015–2025	Scotland	51	(2)
- * Club domestic league appearances and goals as of 14:35, 6 June 2019 ‡ National team caps and goals as of 16 July 2023 (UTC)

Fiona Alison Brown (born 31 March 1995) is a Scottish former footballer who played as a forward.

== Club career ==
Brown played four years at Celtic before she joined Glasgow City in December 2013. She scored the 1–1 in the away match against FC Zürich in the 8th Finals of the UEFA Women's Champions League that Glasgow City in the end won on aggregate.

=== Eskilstuna United DFF (2017) ===
On 19 December 2016, Brown left Scotland and signed with Damallsvenskan club Eskilstuna United DFF. On 19 February 2017, she made her first appearance for the club against Piteå IF in the Svenska Cupen. On 17 April, she made her league debut and scored the winning goal in a 1–0 victory against Hammarby, and was consequently named player of the match. She finished the season with 3 goals in 22 appearances.

=== FC Rosengård (2017–2023) ===
On 21 November 2017, Brown joined FC Rosengård. On 10 February 2018, she made her debut in a 3–0 win over Vittsjö GIK in the Svenska Cupen. On 18 February, she scored a hat-trick in a 16–0 victory against Qviding FIF.

=== Return to Glasgow City ===
On 8 December 2023, Brown signed a pre-contract agreement to rejoin Glasgow City in January 2024 on a two-year deal.

== International career ==
Brown has represented Scotland at under-16, under-17 and under-19 levels. On 8 February 2015, she made her senior debut for Scotland in a 4–0 win against Northern Ireland. On 25 October 2017, she scored her first goal in a 5–0 win against Albania.

== Career statistics ==
=== International appearances ===
As of the match played on 11 April 2023

National team	Year	Apps	Goals
Scotland	2015	7	0
Scotland	2016	1	0
Scotland	2017	16	1
Scotland	2018	8	1
Scotland	2019	7	0
Scotland	2020	—	
Scotland	2021	2	0
Scotland	2022	5	0
Scotland	2023	4	0
Total		50	2

=== International goals ===
Scores and results list Scotland's goal tally first.

Goal	Date	Venue	Opponent	Score	Result	Competition
1	24 October 2017	St Mirren Park, Paisley, Scotland	Albania	2–0	5–0	World Cup 2019 qualification
2	6 March 2018	Pinatar Football Arena, Murcia, Spain	New Zealand	2–0	2–0	Friendly

== Honours ==
Glasgow City

- Scottish Women's Premier League: 2014, 2016
- Scottish Women's Cup: 2014
- Scottish Women's Premier League Cup: 2014, 2015

FC Rosengård

- Svenska Cupen: 2018
