= One Club Award =

Annual association football award

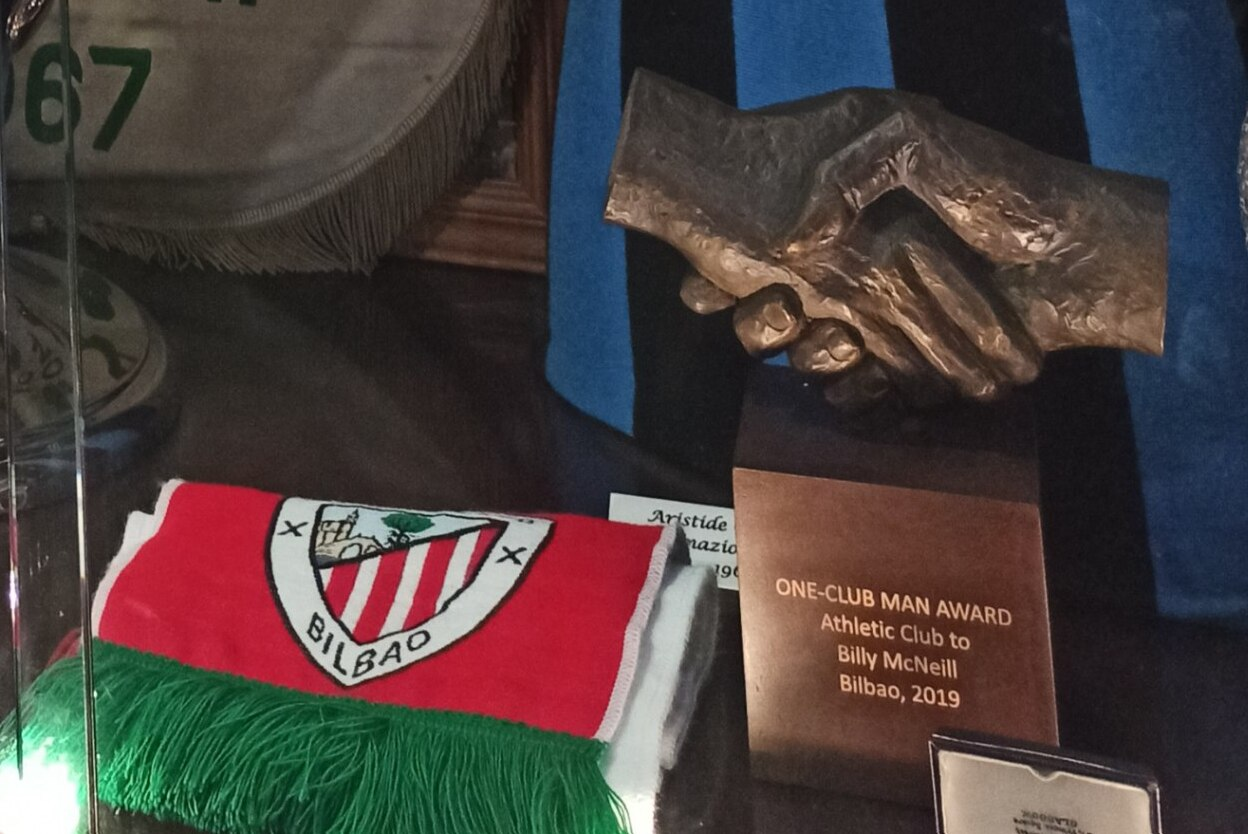
- 2019 award for Billy McNeill, on display at Celtic Park along with Athletic Bilbao scarf
- Presented by: Athletic Bilbao
- First award: 2015
- Website: Official site

The One Club Award is a football award established in 2015 by the Spanish club Athletic Bilbao to reward footballers whose careers in a single team represent values of loyalty, commitment, responsibility, sportsmanship and respect that the club considers linked to its identity. The award is presented at halftime during an Athletic Bilbao home match by club ambassador José Ángel Iribar.

It is one of the few awards given out by an individual club that celebrates players from other teams. For that reason, the award has been described as rare point of non-tribalism in the modern game. The male award, The One Club Man, has been awarded since 2015, while also awarding a female award, known as One Club Woman, from 2019.

== The Award ==
The prize exists to honour players who have demonstrated a "real" connection to region of their club. Athletic Bilbao place particular importance on player loyalty and promotion from within, with the majority of their players graduating from their youth academy system based at the Lezama Facilities outside Bilbao; they have a self-imposed limitation where they will only field players that have a connection to the Basque region where they are based. As such they have a small pool of potential players to choose from compared to other large clubs, and their players are encouraged to agree to long-term contracts to remain.

According to the club, up until the 21st century "the association between clubs and the territory they belonged to was a football club’s most important identifying feature". This feature is what they call the Principle of Origin - "which boils down to: I support the team of where I come from because their players represent me and share my origin. They are “our players”. In recent years, the club believes that the principle of origin has been superseded by success at all costs with clubs often featuring teams without any players from the city the club represents.

== Values ==
Athletic Club define the club's values as:

- Loyalty
  - Towards the club that placed their trust in a young, promising player and developed that player into an elite footballer.
- Commitment
  - To fostering a football culture that encourages a mutual sense of belonging among fans and players.
- Responsibility
  - Towards the cultural identity of the club, the place it belongs to and its fans.
- Sportsmanship
  - Ensuring that the sporting spirit of the game always prevails and that the equality between participants is protected.
- Respect
  - For all fans, whose passion is the raw material that enriches football.

== Winners ==
Edition	One Club Man			One Club Woman		
Edition	Player	Club	Period	Player	Club	Period
2015	(England) Matt Le Tissier	(England) Southampton	1985–2002 (17 seasons)	Not awarded		
2016	(Italy) Paolo Maldini	(Italy) Milan	1984–2009 (25 seasons)	Not awarded		
2017	(Germany) Sepp Maier	(Germany) Bayern Munich	1966–1979 (13 seasons)	Not awarded		
2018	(Spain) Carles Puyol	(Spain) Barcelona	1999–2014 (15 seasons)	Not awarded		
2019	(Scotland) Billy McNeill	(Scotland) Celtic	1957–1975 (18 seasons)	(Sweden) Malin Moström	(Sweden) Umeå IK	1995–2007 (12 seasons)
2020	(Wales) Ryan Giggs	(England) Manchester United	1991–2014 (23 seasons)	(Germany) Pia Wunderlich	(Germany) FFC Frankfurt	1993–2009 (16 seasons)
2021	Not awarded due to the COVID-19 pandemic in Spain					
2022	(Argentina) Ricardo Bochini	(Argentina) Independiente	1972–1991 (19 seasons)	(Germany) Jennifer Zietz	(Germany) Turbine Potsdam	1998–2015 (17 seasons)
2023	(Portugal) João Pinto	(Portugal) Porto	1981–1997 (16 seasons)	(Spain) Matilde Martínez	(Spain) Fundación Albacete	2009–2019; 2021–2022 (12 seasons)
2024	(Italy) Giuseppe Bergomi	(Italy) Inter Milan	1979–1999 (21 seasons)	(Austria) Maria Gstöttner	(Austria) SV Neulengbach	1998–2022 (24 seasons)
2025	(England) Jamie Carragher	(England) Liverpool	1996–2013 (17 seasons)	(Scotland) Joelle Murray	(Scotland) Hibernian	2004–2024 (20 seasons)

== See also ==
- List of one-club men in association football
