= 2020 Pinatar Cup =

2020 edition of the Pinatar Cup

Tournament details
- Host country: Spain
- Dates: 4–10 March
- Teams: 4 (from 1 confederation)
- Venue(s): 1 (in 1 host city)

Final positions
- Champions: Scotland (1st title)
- Runners-up: Iceland
- Third place: Ukraine
- Fourth place: Northern Ireland

Tournament statistics
- Matches played: 6
- Goals scored: 13 (2.17 per match)
- Top scorer(s): (Scotland) Martha Thomas (Ukraine) Daryna Apanashchenko (2 goals)

The 2020 Pinatar Cup was the inaugural edition of the Pinatar Cup, an international women's football tournament, consisting of a series of friendly games. It was held in San Pedro del Pinatar, Spain from 4 to 10 March 2020, and featured four teams.

Scotland won the first edition of the tournament.

== Format ==
The four invited teams played a round-robin tournament. Points awarded in the group stage followed the formula of three points for a win, one point for a draw, and zero points for a loss. A tie in points was decided by goal differential.

== Teams ==
Team	FIFA Rankings (December 2019)
Iceland	18
Northern Ireland	56
Scotland	22
Ukraine	27

== Venues ==
All the matches were played at the Pinatar Arena in San Pedro del Pinatar.

== Standings ==
Pos	Team	Pld	W	D	L	GF	GA	GD	Pts
1	Scotland (C)	3	3	0	0	6	1	+5	9
2	Iceland	3	2	0	1	2	1	+1	6
3	Ukraine	3	1	0	2	4	4	0	3
4	Northern Ireland	3	0	0	3	1	7	−6	0

Rules for classification: 1) points; 2) goal difference; 3) goals scored; 4) head-to-head points; 5) head-to-head goal difference; 6) head-to-head number of goals scored; 7) FIFA ranking.
(C) Champions

== Matches ==
All times are local (UTC+1).

4 March 2020
14:00

Northern Ireland	0–1	Iceland
	Report	Brynjarsdóttir 23'

Pinatar Arena, San Pedro del Pinatar
Referee: Zuzana Valentová (Slovakia)
4 March 2020
18:00

Ukraine	0–3	Scotland
	Report	Thomas 22', 72'; Emslie 77'

Pinatar Arena, San Pedro del Pinatar

7 March 2020
14:00

Scotland	1–0	Iceland
Grant 55'	Report

Pinatar Arena, San Pedro del Pinatar
7 March 2020
19:00

Ukraine	4–0	Northern Ireland
Kozlova 17'; Apanashchenko 33', 37'; Ovdiychuk 39'	Report

Pinatar Arena, San Pedro del Pinatar

10 March 2020
14:00

Iceland	1–0	Ukraine
Jónsdóttir 34'	Report

Pinatar Arena, San Pedro del Pinatar
10 March 2020
19:30

Northern Ireland	1–2	Scotland
Furness 5'	Report	Cuthbert 35'; Grant 38'

Pinatar Arena, San Pedro del Pinatar

== Goalscorers ==
There were 13 goals scored in 6 matches, for an average of 2.17 goals per match.

2 goals

- (Scotland) Abbi Grant
- (Scotland) Martha Thomas
- (Ukraine) Daryna Apanashchenko

1 goal

- (Iceland) Dagný Brynjarsdóttir
- (Iceland) Gunnhildur Yrsa Jónsdóttir
- (Northern Ireland) Rachel Furness
- (Scotland) Erin Cuthbert
- (Scotland) Claire Emslie
- (Ukraine) Nicole Kozlova
- (Ukraine) Olha Ovdiychuk
