= Laura Montgomery =

Scottish footballer and manager (born 1975)

Personal information
- Date of birth: 25 December 1975 (age 50)
- Place of birth: Paisley, Scotland
- Height: 5 ft 7 in (1.70 m)
- Position: Defender

Team information
- Current team: Glasgow City (Club manager)

Youth career
- Maryhill Eagles

Senior career*
Years	Team	Apps	(Gls)
1998–2010	Glasgow City	194	(11)
- * Club domestic league appearances and goals as of 22:35, 13 November 2013 (UTC)

Laura Montgomery (born 25 December 1975) is a Scottish football manager and former player. She played for and captained Glasgow City for 12 years after founding the club in 1998 with her friend Carol Anne Stewart. As a central defender, she won five Scottish Women's Premier League winner's medals, three Scottish Women's Cup winner's medals and played in the UEFA Women's Champions League. Since her playing retirement in 2010, Montgomery has continued in her club manager role and oversees all aspects of running Glasgow City. She is a leading advocate of women's football in Scotland.

== Club career ==
Montgomery did not play organised football until she went to university. After joining a nearby team Maryhill Eagles, she suffered a cruciate ligament injury at the age of 19 and was unable to play for three years: "I didn't know who would give me a game when I was fit again, so I decided to organise a properly run team, and play for them. So I started Glasgow City with a friend, Carol Anne Stewart."

Ambitious Glasgow City were promoted into the Scottish Women's Premier League in their first season. With Montgomery as centre back and captain, they developed into Scotland's dominant team during the following decade. In 2010, she made her 250th competitive appearance for the club in June, then stopped playing in November after leading the team to a fourth successive league title.

== Personal life ==
Montgomery trained as a lawyer at Glasgow University and in 2013 was working as a consultant in the oil and gas industry. In June 2017, she joined Hibernian F.C. as their head of sales and sponsorship.

She has been an outspoken critic of sexist and misogynist attitudes to women's sports in Scotland.

Her partner Kat Lindner, who also played for Glasgow City, died by suicide in February 2019.
