= Toryglen Regional Football Centre =

Sports venue in Glasgow, Scotland

Coordinates: 55.8277°N 4.2440°W

Toryglen Regional Football Centre is a facility for football in the Toryglen area of Glasgow, Scotland. The complex was completed in 2009 and is situated close to the national stadium, Hampden Park.

== History ==
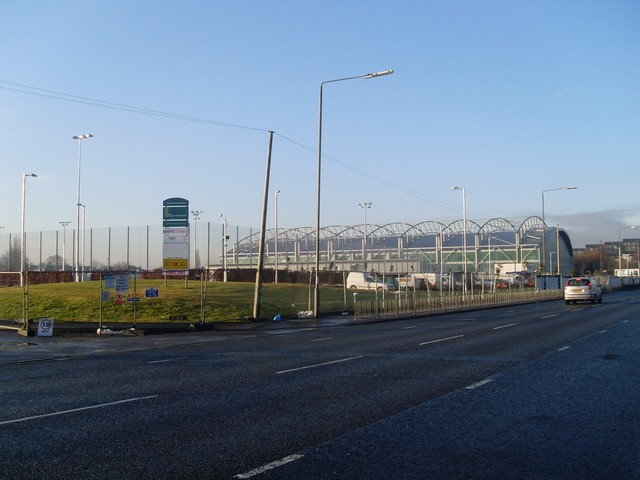
Toryglen Regional Football Centre just prior to opening in 2009

Toryglen cost approximately £17 million to build, with funding from Glasgow City Council and sportscotland. It was constructed by CBC and uses turf from Greenfields. The centre opened for business in April 2009, with the official opening in August of that year; Scotland's most-capped player Kenny Dalglish was the special guest at the ceremony.

The centre was built on old red blaes (gravel) playing fields used by Queen's Park Secondary School (closed 1994); some of the land may have been contaminated with toxic chromium waste from a local chemical works. The culverted Malls Mire Burn flows beneath the site. A large supermarket and a regional police headquarters are located nearby.

== Features ==
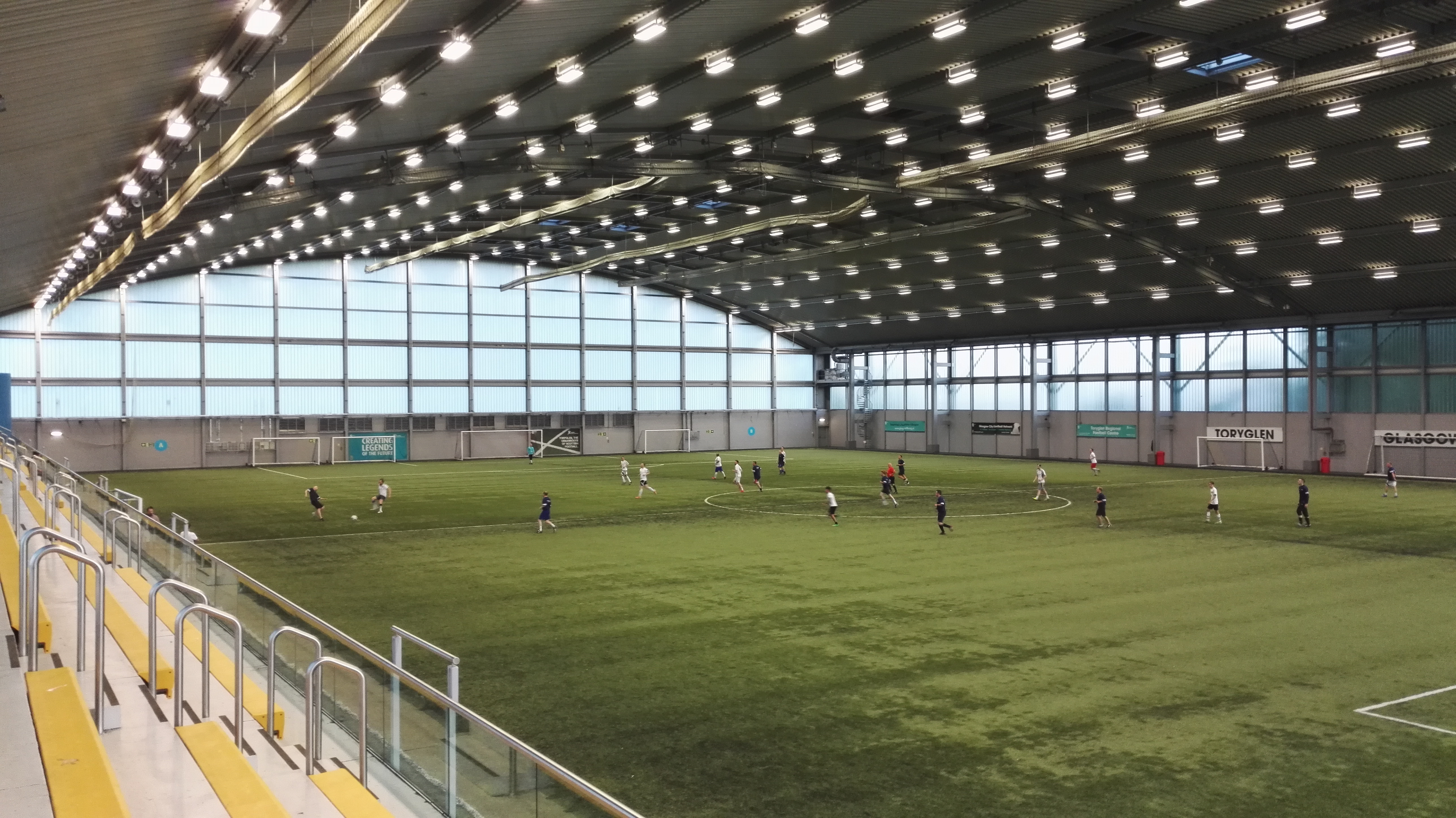
Indoor pitch at its full extent during an amateur match

The main feature is a fully enclosed, international-sized artificial turf pitch engineered to the highest specifications available at the time. The dimensions of the playing field are the same as Celtic Park. There is also a raised visitor area featuring a snack bar and bench seating for 700 spectators. There are three full-sized, FIFA-approved 2-star floodlit outdoor artificial pitches outside. The primary outdoor pitch was re-laid in late 2018 after a decade of constant use.

The indoor pitch includes a plastic/canvas dividing curtain which can be lowered and raised from the 18m-high ceiling, separating the area into halves or quarter sections suitable for Seven-a-side games. The Toryglen complex has its own vehicle parking and more spaces are available near Hampden (except on event days at the stadium).

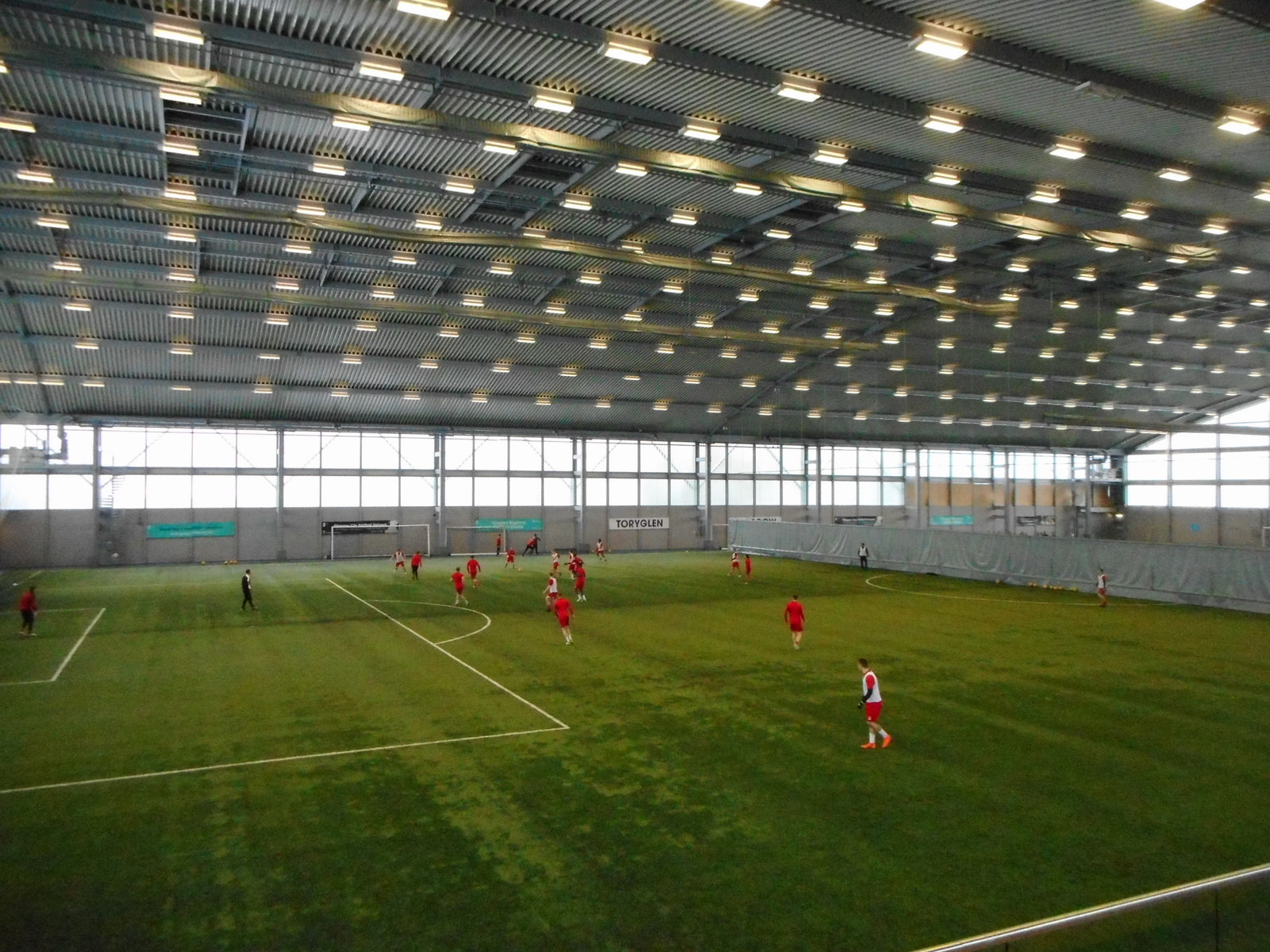
The pitch divided into two halves (grey curtain)

No professional team is based at Toryglen, meaning the facilities can be hired by local clubs and groups at most times. A large proportion of the juvenile and amateur teams in the Glasgow and Rutherglen/Cambuslang areas who do not have a permanent home ground of their own now play their fixtures at the complex (including the revived Third Lanark) due to the quality of the surface and the low chance of cancellation due to weather conditions (although the outdoor parks are susceptible to waterlogging in heavy rain). In 2012 the controlling company faced criticism from youth teams’ representatives over prices rises at Toryglen.

Minor international matches such as Scotland women's under-17 and Centenary Shield (schoolboy) fixtures have been played there, and professional teams have trained at the facility when their usual training grounds were unavailable during times of bad weather. The outdoor pitches have hosted semi-finals of the Scottish Women's Cup, while the final of the 2011 competition was staged indoors at the venue.

== See also ==
Other indoor football facilities in Scotland:

- Oriam (Edinburgh)
- Ravenscraig Regional Sports Facility (Motherwell)
- Aberdeen Sports Village (Aberdeen)
