= Joelle Murray =

Scottish footballer (born 1986)

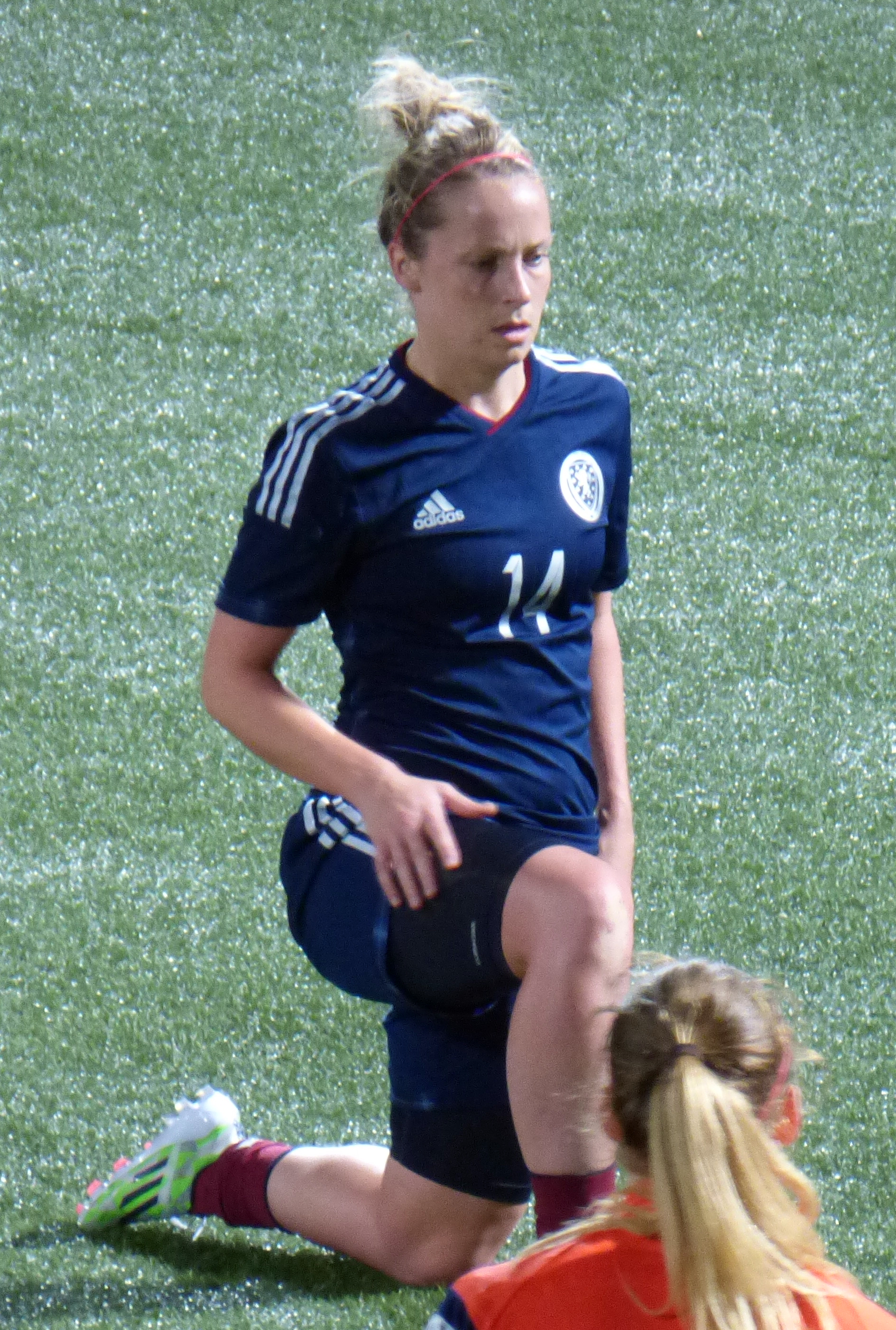
- Murray playing for Scotland in 2015

Personal information
- Full name: Joelle Louise Murray
- Date of birth: 7 November 1986 (age 40)
- Place of birth: Chirnside, Scotland
- Height: 1.67 m (5 ft 6 in)
- Position: Defender

Team information
- Current team: Hibernian (manager)
- Number: 17

Youth career
- Coldstream BC
- Chirnside BC
- Hibernian

Senior career*
Years	Team	Apps	(Gls)
2004–2024	Hibernian		

International career^{‡}
2008	Scotland U23	1	(0)
2007–2019	Scotland	48	(1)

Managerial career
- 2025–: Hibernian
- * Club domestic league appearances and goals ‡ National team caps and goals as of 6 March 2019

Joelle Louise Murray (born 7 November 1986) is a Scottish football coach and former player, who is currently the manager of Scottish Women's Premier League club Hibernian. Murray played as a defender for Hibernian and the Scotland national team.

== Career ==
Murray grew up in Chirnside, Scotland, and started her career playing with local boys' clubs. At the age of 12 she joined the youth set-up at Hibernian Ladies. She progressed through the age groups and into the senior side, winning all domestic honours along the way and latterly being under-17 captain. Murray made her UEFA Women's Cup debut in July 2004 against Rapide Wezemaal and has made six appearances in the competition to date.

After being called up to the Scotland Under-17 squad in 2002, Murray came through the various age-group teams and made her full international debut against Belgium in August 2007. She scored her first international goal against Northern Ireland in a May 2009 challenge match.

Murray is the most decorated Hibernian player of all time and was the first woman ever at Hibernian to sign a professional contract, on 21 February 2020.

=== Retirement ===
Murray's decision to retire at the end of the 2023–24 season was announced on Twitter on 8 May 2024. During her career she made 507 appearances for Hibernian Women and was capped 48 times for Scotland. The 37-year-old won all domestic trophies with her childhood club – including two SWPL titles, seven Scottish Cups and five League Cups.

Speaking to the Hibernian FC website regarding her retirement she stated: “physically and mentally I feel it is the right time for me to bow out of the game and I hope I've left it in a better place than I found it."

She was inducted into the club's Hall of Fame in 2024 and was presented with a One Club Award by Athletic Bilbao a year later.

== Coaching career ==
After Grant Scott left the club in December 2025, Murray was appointed Hibs manager.

== Career statistics ==
=== International appearances ===
As of the match played on 11 April 2023

Appearances and goals by national team and year
National team	Year	Apps	Goals
Scotland	2007	2	0
Scotland	2008	2	0
Scotland	2009	4	1
Scotland	2010	9	0
Scotland	2011	—	
Scotland	2012	1	0
Scotland	2013	11	0
Scotland	2014	4	0
Scotland	2015	1	0
Scotland	2016	4	0
Scotland	2017	7	0
Scotland	2018	—	
Scotland	2019	3	0
Total		48	1

=== International goals ===
Scores and results list Scotland's goal tally first.

#	Date	Venue	Opponent	Result	Competition	Scored
1	12 May 2009	Forthbank Stadium, Stirling	Northern Ireland	3–1	Friendly	1
