= 2017 Scottish Women's Premier League =

Scottish Women's Premier League 1
- Season: 2017
- Champions: Glasgow City (12th title)
- Relegated: Aberdeen Ladies
- Champions League: Glasgow City
- Matches: 21
- Goals: 78 (3.71 per match)
- Top goalscorer: Abi Harrison (15 goals)
- Biggest home win: Glasgow City 7–0 Stirling University
- Biggest away win: Hamilton Academical 0–4 Rangers
- Highest scoring: Stirling University 5–3 Rangers
- Longest winning run: 4 matches: Hibernian
- Longest unbeaten run: 5 matches: Glasgow City & Spartans
- Longest winless run: 6 matches: Aberdeen
- Longest losing run: 4 matches: Aberdeen & Hamilton Academical
- All statistics correct as of 2 February 2018.

The 2017 Scottish Women's Premier League season was the 16th season of the Scottish Women's Premier League, the highest division of women's football in Scotland since its inception in 2002.

Glasgow City won the SWPL 1 title unbeaten. It was their eleventh consecutive title.

== Teams ==
Locations of teams in the 2017 SWPL 1

Team	Location	Home ground	Capacity	2016 position
Aberdeen	Aberdeen	Heathryfold Park	2,200	7th
Celtic	Glasgow	K Park Training Academy, East Kilbride	1,000	3rd
Glasgow City	Glasgow	Excelsior Stadium, Airdrie	10,100	1st
Hamilton Academical	Hamilton	New Douglas Park	5,510	1st in SWPL 2 (promoted)
Hibernian	Edinburgh	Albyn Park, Broxburn	1,000	2nd
Rangers	Glasgow	Tinto Park	2,000	5th
Spartans	Edinburgh	Spartans Academy	2,000	6th
Stirling University	Stirling	University of Stirling	1,000	4th

== Format ==
Teams played each other three times, with the bottom placed team being relegated after the season.

== Standings ==
Teams played 21 matches each.

Pos	Team	Pld	W	D	L	GF	GA	GD	Pts	Qualification or relegation
1	Glasgow City (C)	21	19	2	0	70	4	+66	59	2018–19 Champions League
2	Hibernian	21	18	0	3	75	14	+61	54	
3	Celtic	21	11	2	8	54	30	+24	35	
4	Stirling University	21	8	4	9	26	39	−13	28	
5	Spartans	21	8	4	9	26	46	−20	28	
6	Rangers	21	6	2	13	33	51	−18	20	
7	Hamilton Academical	21	4	1	16	15	50	−35	13	
8	Aberdeen (R)	21	1	3	17	16	81	−65	6	2018 SWPL 2

Source: Soccerway
Rules for classification: 1) Points; 2) Goal difference; 3) Number of goals scored
(C) Champions; (R) Relegated

== Results ==
=== Matches 1 to 14 ===
Home \ Away	ABE	CEL	GLA	HAM	HIB	RAN	SPA	STI
Aberdeen		0–7	0–3	3–0	2–7	2–2	2–2	0–0
Celtic	6–1		1–1	4–0	1–3	5–1	3–0	2–1
Glasgow City	8–0	4–0		3–1	1–0	5–0	5–0	7–0
Hamilton Academical	5–1	1–2	1–3		0–3	0–4	0–1	0–1
Hibernian	6–0	3–1	1–2	6–0		2–0	8–0	2–0
Rangers	1–0	4–1	0–3	0–2	2–4		1–3	2–3
Spartans	3–0	1–1	0–5	0–0	0–4	3–1		0–1
Stirling University	4–2	0–2	0–0	1–0	0–3	5–3	0–1	

Updated to match(es) played on 29 September 2017. Source: Scottish Women's Football
Legend: Blue = home team win; Yellow = draw; Red = away team win.

=== Matches 15 to 21 ===
Home \ Away	ABE	CEL	GLA	HAM	HIB	RAN	SPA	STI
Aberdeen			0–3				1–2	1–3
Celtic	6–0		0–2		1–2			4–1
Glasgow City				3–0		2–0	5–0	3–0
Hamilton Academical	1–0	0–4				2–1	0–3	
Hibernian	8–0		0–3	4–0				
Rangers	4–1	2–1			1–4			
Spartans		3–2			0–3	2–3		
Stirling University				3–2	0–2	1–1	2–2	

Updated to match(es) played on unknown. Source: Scottish Women's Football
Legend: Blue = home team win; Yellow = draw; Red = away team win.

== Awards ==
=== Monthly awards ===
The "Player of the Month" award was first awarded in September 2017.

Month	Player of the Month		References
Month	Player	Club	References
September	(Scotland) Rachel Donaldson	Stirling University	
October	(Scotland) Amy Anderson	Hamilton Academical	
November	(Scotland) Abbi Grant	Glasgow City	

=== Annual awards ===
Award	Winner	Club	References
SWPL 1 Golden Boot	(Scotland) Abi Harrison	Hibernian	
