= Ravenscraig Regional Sports Facility =

Public leisure centre

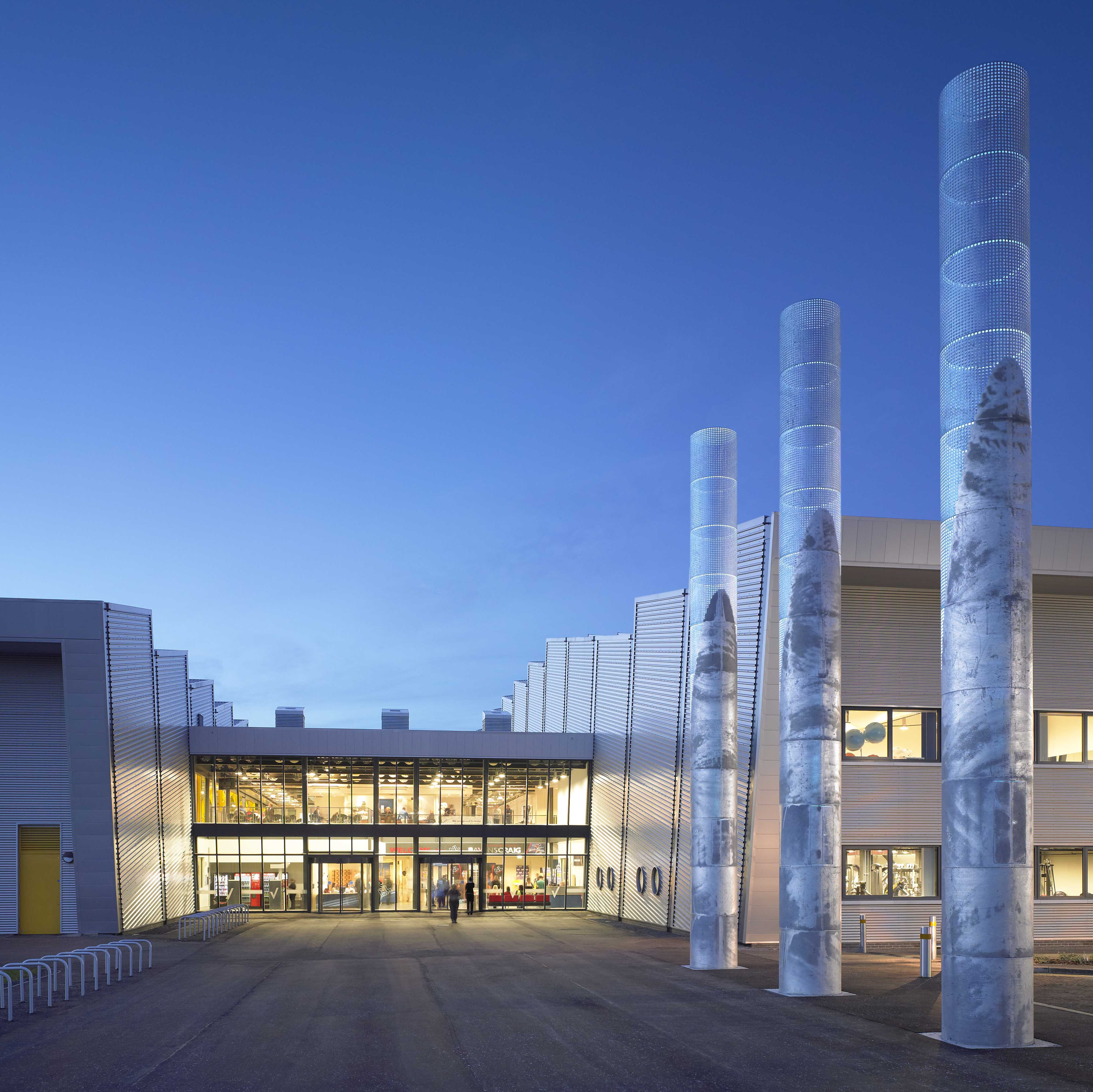
- Main entrance to the facility

- Location within North Lanarkshire
- Location: Ravenscraig Regional Sports Facility; Motherwell; North Lanarkshire; Scotland
- Coordinates: 55°47′37.03″N 3°57′48.68″W
- Owner: Edward rennie (chairman)
- Operator: Sportscotland

Construction
- Opened: 30 September 2010
- Cost: £30 Million (estimate)
- Architect: Populous

The Ravenscraig Regional Sports Facility is a public leisure centre that is located in the Ravenscraig area of Motherwell, North Lanarkshire, Scotland.

== History ==
The sports facility first came to attention when plans were being drawn up to form a new town on the site of the former Ravenscraig steelworks, which closed in 1992. The sports facility project was given the go-ahead in November 2008. Work on the new facility got underway in mid-2009.

However, the project was at the centre of serious funding issues between different companies and councils, and thus delayed the beginning of construction by one year.

The building has been fully completed and was opened to the public on 4 October 2010. Before opening, there was a 24-hour charity football event on 30 September 2010. On 16 February 2011, Provost Tom Curley officially opened the facility, and it was estimated that over 100,000 people had used the facility for the first five months in operation.

== Facilities ==
Some of the amenities that the facility includes are:

- Full size indoor 3rd generation synthetic football pitch with spectator seating (FIFA 2 star standard)
- 135m indoor athletics track with throws and jump areas, including high jump, long jump, triple jump and pole vault. Also included is a throw cage suitable for javelin, hammer and discus.
- Strength and conditioning area based within the athletics hall containing 5 Olympic weightlifting platforms.
- 9 court badminton sports hall with sprung flooring and spectator seating
- Fitness gym
- Full-size outdoor 3rd generation synthetic football/rugby pitch (FIFA 2 star standard)
- Six five-a-side 3rd generation synthetic floodlit football pitches
- Two dance studios with sprung flooring
- Starbucks cafe
- Sports injuries clinic
- Drug testing area
- Office facilities and meeting rooms

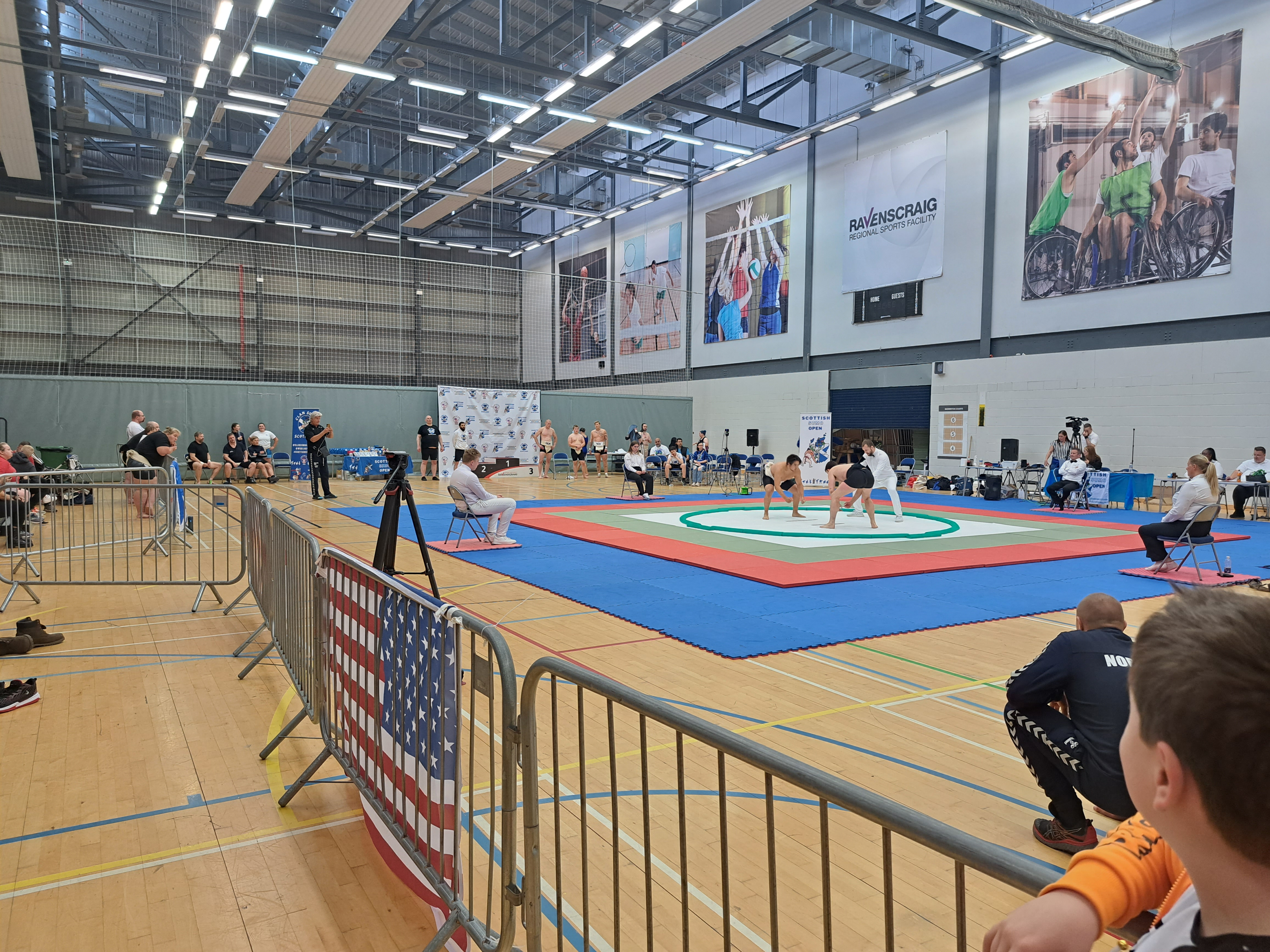
A sports hall at Ravenscraig Regional Sports Facility during a sumo tournament

There is also a jogging track completely surrounding the building that connects with the wider network of cycling and jogging paths throughout Ravenscraig and beyond. A mobile tennis court has been added for indoor and outdoor use, the first of its type in the UK.

== Praise ==
The facility has, even before opening, received several positive commendations. One in particular was from the Scottish football team manager Craig Levein, who said that the facility would benefit football and the local community. Former First Minister Henry McLeish also admitted in part one of his report of Scottish football that facilities like Ravenscraig are important for the future of the national game. Also, former Commonwealth Games gold medalist Yvonne Murray says that the facility will benefit sport in Scotland, saying that it will boost the nations medal tally. In June 2011, First Minister Alex Salmond praised the facility, admitting that it will deliver a real and lasting legacy for Scotland and North Lanarkshire. On 13 October 2011, over a year after opening, it was revealed that the facility had attracted over 500,000 people, and by 27 June 2012, the visitor count had past the million mark.

== Major events ==
The facility is being strongly considered as a training facility for the 2012 Olympics in London and the 2014 Commonwealth Games in Glasgow. Ravenscraig regional facility was also the main facility for the 2011 International Children's Games that took place in Lanarkshire, hosting the badminton and the athletics events. The facility has also been host to several major sporting events, such as the British Lightweight Boxing Title Fight and the Premier League Snooker tournament. as well as several other events involving big names in British Sport. In recent times, the facility has also been confirmed as one of six 2020 Football Performance Centres across Scotland. On 27 June 2012, it was revealed that over 500 sporting events had been held in the facility.

== See also ==
Other indoor football facilities in Scotland:

- Toryglen Regional Football Centre (Glasgow)
- Oriam (Edinburgh)
- Aberdeen Sports Village (Aberdeen)
