= 2014 Scottish Women's Premier League =

Scottish Women's Premier League
- Season: 2014
- Champions: Glasgow City (9th title)
- Relegated: Queen's Park; Buchan
- Champions League: Glasgow City
- Matches: 126
- Goals: 581 (4.61 per match)
- Biggest home win: Spartans 16–0 Forfar Farmington; 27 April 2014
- Biggest away win: Buchan Ladies 0–10 Rangers; 20 April 2014; Inverness City 0–10 Glasgow City; 27 April 2014
- Highest scoring: Spartans 16–0 Forfar Farmington; 27 April 2014

The 2014 Scottish Women's Premier League was the thirteenth season of the Scottish Women's Premier League, the highest division of women's football in Scotland since its inception in 2002. The competition started on 16 March 2014.

A total of twelve teams contested the league. Glasgow City were the reigning champions. Queen's Park and Inverness City were promoted from the SWFL First Division after finishing 1st and 3rd respectively in 2013 (First Division runners-up Celtic Reserves were unable to be promoted as league rules stipulate each club may field only one team in the Premier League).

The SWPL continued in the format applied since 2012. The 12 clubs faced each other once (11 games per club), after which the league split into top six and bottom six sections based on league position. Each club then played home and away against clubs in their respective sections to give a total of 21 games.

Glasgow City confirmed their eighth consecutive championship title on 1 October 2014. City suffered their first on-field league defeat since the 2008–09 season when they lost 1–0 to Spartans in September 2014 (a fixture against Forfar Farmington during the 2012 season was retrospectively awarded to the opposition due to Glasgow City fielding an ineligible player). Glasgow City also won the 2014 Scottish Women's Premier League Cup and the 2014 Scottish Women's Cup to complete the 'treble', the fourth in their history and third in a row. Rangers were runners-up, 17 points behind the champions. Queen's Park and Buchan were relegated.

== Teams ==
=== Stadia and locations ===
Locations of teams in the 2014 Premier League

The most regular home ground is shown though some clubs played matches at other venues throughout the season.

| Team | Location | Home ground | Finishing position 2013 |
|---|---|---|---|
| Aberdeen | Aberdeen | Heathryfold Park | 6th |
| Buchan LFC | Maud | Pleasure Park | 10th |
| Celtic | Glasgow | Celtic Training Centre, Lennoxtown | 3rd |
| Forfar Farmington | Forfar | Station Park | 8th |
| Glasgow City | Glasgow | Petershill Park | Champions |
| Hamilton Academical | Hamilton | John Cumming Stadium, Carluke | 7th |
| Hibernian | Edinburgh | Albyn Park, Broxburn | 2nd |
| Hutchison Vale | Edinburgh | Saughton Enclosure | 9th |
| Inverness City | Inverness | Bught Park | SWFL First Division, 3rd |
| Queen's Park | Glasgow | Woodfarm HS, Thornliebank | SWFL First Division, 1st |
| Rangers | Glasgow | Petershill Park | 5th |
| Spartans | Edinburgh | Spartans Academy | 4th |

== League standings ==
| Pos | Team | Pld | W | D | L | GF | GA | GD | Pts | Qualification or relegation |
|---|---|---|---|---|---|---|---|---|---|---|
| 1 | Glasgow City (C, Q) | 21 | 20 | 0 | 1 | 87 | 13 | +74 | 60 | 2015–16 Champions League |
| 2 | Rangers | 21 | 13 | 4 | 4 | 71 | 24 | +47 | 43 | |
| 3 | Hibernian | 21 | 14 | 1 | 6 | 63 | 32 | +31 | 43 | |
| 4 | Spartans | 21 | 12 | 2 | 7 | 60 | 30 | +30 | 38 | |
| 5 | Celtic | 21 | 9 | 2 | 10 | 55 | 32 | +23 | 29 | |
| 6 | Aberdeen | 21 | 6 | 3 | 12 | 41 | 44 | −3 | 21 | |
| 7 | Hamilton Academical | 21 | 11 | 3 | 7 | 46 | 33 | +13 | 36 | |
| 8 | Inverness City | 21 | 8 | 2 | 11 | 40 | 73 | −33 | 26 | |
| 9 | Hutchison Vale | 21 | 6 | 6 | 9 | 21 | 57 | −36 | 24 | |
| 10 | Forfar Farmington | 21 | 5 | 4 | 12 | 33 | 85 | −52 | 19 | |
| 11 | Queen's Park (R) | 21 | 3 | 3 | 15 | 26 | 64 | −38 | 12 | Relegation to SWFL First Division |
| 12 | Buchan LFC (R) | 21 | 4 | 0 | 17 | 30 | 94 | −64 | 12 | Relegation to SWFL First Division |

Source: Scottish Women's FA
Rules for classification: 1) Points; 2) Goal difference; 3) Number of goals scored
(C) Champions; (Q) Qualified for the phase indicated; (R) Relegated

== Results ==
=== Matches 1–11 ===
Clubs play each other once.

| Home \ Away | ABD | BUC | CEL | FFM | GLC | HAM | HIB | HUT | INV | QPL | RAN | SPA |
|---|---|---|---|---|---|---|---|---|---|---|---|---|
| Aberdeen | | | 0–5 | 7–2 | | 3–2 | 0–1 | 8–1 | | | | 1–2 |
| Buchan LFC | 1–3 | | | 0–4 | | 0–2 | 1–9 | | | | 0–10 | 2–5 |
| Celtic | | 10–0 | | | 0–1 | | | 2–0 | 7–0 | 8–1 | | 1–0 |
| Forfar Farmington | | | 1–7 | | | 1–7 | 1–7 | 1–2 | 1–1 | | | |
| Glasgow City | 2–0 | 13–0 | | 9–0 | | | | | | 3–1 | 3–2 | |
| Hamilton Academical | | | 1–3 | | 1–4 | | 3–4 | 1–1 | 3–2 | | | |
| Hibernian | | | 1–0 | | 1–4 | | | 4–0 | 7–0 | 6–0 | | |
| Hutchison Vale | | 2–1 | | | 0–9 | | | | 1–4 | 3–3 | 1–3 | 4–2 |
| Inverness City | 0–5 | 6–0 | | | 0–10 | | | | | 3–0 | 2–6 | |
| Queen's Park | 0–5 | 1–2 | | 2–2 | | 1–6 | | | | | 1–4 | |
| Rangers | 2–0 | | 2–1 | 14–0 | | 2–0 | 3–0 | | | | | 0–0 |
| Spartans | | | | 16–0 | 1–3 | 2–1 | 3–1 | | 11–0 | 2–1 | | |

Updated to match(es) played on 29 June 2014. Source: Scottish Women's FA
Legend: Blue = home team win; Yellow = draw; Red = away team win.

=== Matches 12–21 ===
After 11 matches, the league splits into top six and bottom six sections. Clubs played every other club in their section twice (home and away).

==== Top six ====
| Home \ Away | ABD | CEL | GLC | HIB | RAN | SPA |
|---|---|---|---|---|---|---|
| Aberdeen | | 2–2 | 1–2 | 1–2 | 3–3 | 0–2 |
| Celtic | 1–1 | | 0–4 | 1–2 | 0–4 | 3–2 |
| Glasgow City | 4–0 | 1–0 | | 3–1 | 3–1 | 0–1 |
| Hibernian | 4–0 | 3–2 | 0–3 | | 1–4 | 2–0 |
| Rangers | 5–1 | 2–1 | 1–2 | 2–2 | | 0–2 |
| Spartans | 1–0 | 4–1 | 2–4 | 1–5 | 1–1 | |

Updated to match(es) played on 2 November 2014. Source: Scottish Women's FA
Legend: Blue = home team win; Yellow = draw; Red = away team win.

==== Bottom six ====
| Home \ Away | BUC | FFM | HAM | HUT | INV | QPL |
|---|---|---|---|---|---|---|
| Buchan LFC | | 2–1 | 0–3 | 7–2 | 2–3 | 5–2 |
| Forfar Farmington | 4–0 | | 1–2 | 2–2 | 3–1 | 3–0 |
| Hamilton Academical | 3–2 | 1–0 | | 1–1 | 2–0 | 2–1 |
| Hutchison Vale | 2–1 | 2–1 | 1–1 | | 2–3 | 0–0 |
| Inverness City | 5–3 | 3–3 | 3–1 | 2–0 | | 1–3 |
| Queen's Park | 4–1 | 0–2 | 1–3 | 1–2 | 3–1 | |

Updated to match(es) played on 2 November 2014. Source: Scottish Women's FA
Legend: Blue = home team win; Yellow = draw; Red = away team win.
