= Eilish McSorley =

Scottish footballer (born 1993)

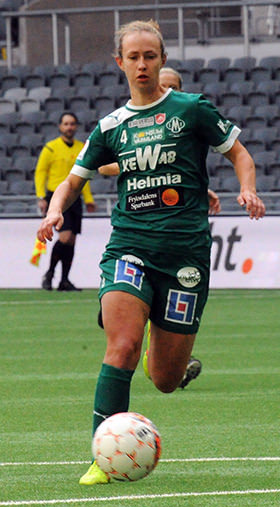

Personal information
- Date of birth: 24 April 1993 (age 33)
- Place of birth: Girvan, Scotland
- Height: 1.67 m (5 ft 6 in)
- Positions: Centre back; defensive midfielder

Youth career
- 1999–2005: Girvan Boys' Club
- 2005–2007: Ayr United Girls
- 2007–2008: Kilmarnock Girls

Senior career*
Years	Team	Apps	(Gls)
2008–2014	Glasgow City		
2015–2016	Mallbackens IF	19	(0)
2017	Glasgow City		
2018	Västerås BK30	11	(2)
2018–2019	Sassuolo	14	(2)
2019	Glasgow City		

International career^{‡}
2009–2012	Scotland U19	28	(6)
2012–2015	Scotland	20	(0)
- * Club domestic league appearances and goals as of 22:35, 16 November 2018 (UTC) ‡ National team caps and goals as of 15:37, 16 April 2023 (UTC)

Eilish McSorley (born 24 April 1993) is a Scottish professional footballer who plays as a defender or midfielder for the Scotland women's national team.

== Club career ==
Between the age of six and twelve McSorley played for Girvan Boys' Club. Before moving on to Ayr United GFC under-17's and then Kilmarnock LFC under-17. She joined Glasgow City in August 2008, and was promoted from the reserves into the first team for City's UEFA Women's Champions League campaign in 2009.

McSorley helped Glasgow City reach the quarter-finals of the 2014–15 UEFA Women's Champions League but elected to join Swedish Damallsvenskan side Mallbackens IF in January 2015 on a one-year professional contract. She made 19 league appearances in the 2015 season as Mallbackens narrowly avoided relegation. Happy with life in Sweden, she agreed to remain with the club despite suffering an ankle injury.

The injury proved to be serious and McSorley was out of football until she returned to Glasgow City in September 2017. She returned to Sweden to play for Västerås BK30 in the first half of the Elitettan season, before joining Italian Serie A club Sassuolo in July 2018.

== International career ==
Having progressed through the Scotland age group sides from under-16 upwards, McSorley made her debut for the full Scotland national side against Cameroon in a July 2012 challenge match.

McSorley's protracted injury ruled her out of consideration for Scotland's UEFA Women's Euro 2017 squad, although she had played in the early qualifiers.

== Personal life ==
McSorley is a Celtic F.C. supporter.

== Career statistics ==
=== International appearances ===
As of the match played on 11 April 2023

National team	Year	Apps	Goals
Scotland	2012	3	0
Scotland	2013	11	0
Scotland	2014	1	0
Scotland	2015	5	0
Total		20	0
