= Rangers W.F.C. =

Rangers
- Full name: Rangers Women's Football Club
- Nickname: The Blue Belles
- Founded: 2008 (18 years ago)
- Ground: Ibrox Stadium; Glasgow, Scotland
- Capacity: 51,700
- Owner: The Rangers Football Club Ltd
- Chairman: Andrew Cavenagh
- Head coach: Leanne Crichton
- League: SWPL 1
- 2025–26: SWPL 1, 2nd of 12
- Website: rangers.co.uk
Home colours	Away colours	Third colours

Rangers Women's Football Club is a women's football team that plays in the Scottish Women's Premier League, the top division of football in Scotland.

== History ==
Paisley City Ladies, formerly Arthurlie Ladies, was founded at the start of the 1999–2000 season. As a new club they started in the third (lowest) tier. In 2001–02 they played in Division One, directly under the Premier League, and stayed there until 2008. In the 2007–08 season they suffered financial problems, and began to search for a partnership with another club.

Rangers L.F.C. was founded in 2008, as Rangers followed the example of Celtic, Hibernian and Aberdeen in developing a women's section. The formation of the team involved a partnership with Paisley City Ladies. Former Rangers youth academy coach Drew Todd was brought in to coach the team. Scotland player Jayne Sommerville was signed as the new team's first captain. They took the league place of Paisley City and many players switched too. Rangers won the league in their debut season. They also reached the final of the Scottish Women's Cup but lost 5–0 to Glasgow City; they were the first side playing in a lower division to reach the final.

Former East Stirlingshire footballer Scott Allison was appointed manager in 2010. The club reached the Cup final again but were beaten 2–1 by Hibernian.

In May 2011, Alana Marshall became the first female Rangers player to be called up by the senior Scotland team.

In February 2012, The Herald newspaper reported that the financial crisis engulfing Rangers also threatened the existence of the club's women's section. The team continued to operate under budgetary constraints, and having appointed Angie Hind as coach (who was able to add quality to the squad using her extensive network of contacts in the women's game) they ended the 2014 SWPL season with a second place finish, the club's best result up to that point.

Ahead of the 2018 season, the official name of the team was changed to 'Rangers Women' from the previous 'Rangers Ladies'. In July 2019, the club announced a significant commitment to women's football by integrating their teams more fully into its operations and providing further financial support with the aim of becoming professional. To this end, the incumbent coach Amy McDonald was installed in a new position as Women's Manager, with former player and youth trainer Grégory Vignal appointed as head coach of the senior team. A few months later the team moved their home fixtures to the Rangers Training Centre in Milngavie following improvements made to its facilities, having previously been using New Tinto Park (home of Benburb F.C.) in the Govan area of Glasgow, near to the club's Ibrox Stadium. In January 2020 Malky Thomson was appointed joint first-team coach alongside Vignal, in June of the same year Vignal left the club Thomson was named head of the women's first team. In 2022, an arrangement was reached to play home fixtures at Broadwood Stadium in Cumbernauld, due to capacity and parking issues at the training venue. Jo Potter replaced Thomson ahead of the 2023–24 season, winning the cup double before retaining both in the 2024–25 season. Potter left Rangers in June 2025 to join Crystal Palace.

Ahead of the 2025–26 season, Rangers announced that Ibrox Stadium would become the main home venue for the women's team unless there was a fixture clash with the men's team, in which case Broadwood Stadium would still be used. On 4 August 2025, Leanne Crichton was announced as head coach, signing a 3 year deal replacing Jo Potter.

== Current squad ==
As of 9 September 2026

Note: Flags indicate national team as defined under FIFA eligibility rules; some limited exceptions apply. Players may hold more than one non-FIFA nationality.

No.	Pos.	Nation	Player
1	GK	SCO	Jenna Fife
2	DF	SCO	Nicola Docherty (captain)
3	MF	SCO	Bailley Collins
4	DF	SCO	Kathryn Hill
6	DF	NIR	Laura Rafferty
7	FW	SCO	Brogan Hay
8	MF	DEN	Gry Thrysøe
9	FW	SCO	Laura Berry
10	DF	NZL	Hannah Blake
11	DF	NED	Mijke Roelfsema
13	DF	SCO	Lily Boyce
14	FW	ENG	Eva Hendle (on loan from Chelsea)

No.	Pos.	Nation	Player
16	DF	SCO	Eilidh Austin
18	GK	JPN	Shu Ohba
19	FW	SCO	Sarah Ewens
21	MF	SCO	May Cruft
22	DF	SCO	Kirsty Smith
24	FW	GRE	Calliste Brookshire
26	FW	SCO	Jodi McLeary
29	DF	SCO	Fallon Connolly-Jackson
40	MF	SCO	Sophie Black
44	FW	ENG	Katie Wilkinson

== Former players ==
Lisa Swanson, Lesley McMaster, Natalie Lowe, Jayne Sommerville..

== Coaching staff ==
Position	Staff
Head Coach	(Scotland) Leanne Crichton
Assistant Coach	(Scotland) Colin Crichton
Assistant Coach	(Scotland) Adam Gibson
Women’s and Girls Managing Director	Donald Gillies
Head of Women's and Girls Goalkeeping Coach	Chris Flockhart
Women Girl's Analysis & Research Lead	Robert Greenwood
Lead Women's & Girls' Performance Coach	Lucy Hill
Women's Operations Executive	Gillian Wood
Kit Controller	Heather Renicks

== Season-by-season records ==
Rangers Women F.C. seasons
Season	League division	P	W	D	L	F	A	Pts	Pos	Scottish Woman's Cup	SWPL Cup	Champions League
2008–09	Scottish Women's First Division	18	18	0	0	89	12	54	1st	Final	n/a	did not qualify
2009	Scottish Women's Premier League	11	4	0	7	20	27	12	7th	Final	Semi-final	did not qualify
2010	Scottish Women's Premier League	22	8	4	10	52	53	28	8th	Third Round	Quarter-final	did not qualify
2011	Scottish Women's Premier League	20	7	5	8	51	50	26	7th	Quarter-final	Semi-final	did not qualify
2012	Scottish Women's Premier League	21	7	3	11	37	41	24	9th	Semi-final	Quarter-final	did not qualify
2013	Scottish Women's Premier League	21	10	3	8	55	35	33	5th	Quarter-final	First Round	did not qualify
2014	Scottish Women's Premier League	21	13	4	4	71	24	43	2nd	Semi-final	First Round	did not qualify
2015	Scottish Women's Premier League	21	8	0	13	30	57	24	6th	Third Round	First Round	did not qualify
2016	Scottish Women's Premier League	21	9	0	12	35	57	27	5th	Semi-final	Semi-final	did not qualify
2017	Scottish Women's Premier League	21	6	2	13	33	51	20	6th	Second Round	Quarter-final	did not qualify
2018	Scottish Women's Premier League	21	8	1	12	33	46	25	4th	Semi-final	Quarter-final	did not qualify
2019	Scottish Women's Premier League	21	11	1	9	35	57	34	4th	Quarter-final	Semi-final	did not qualify
2020	Scottish Women's Premier League	1	1	0	0	3	0	3	x	no competition	no competition	did not qualify
2020–21	Scottish Women's Premier League	21	16	0	5	76	10	48	3rd	no competition	no competition	did not qualify
2021–22	Scottish Women's Premier League	27	25	2	0	97	11	77	1st	Fourth Round	Quarter-final	did not qualify
2022–23	Scottish Women's Premier League	32	24	6	2	111	9	78	3rd	Final	Winners	Round 2
2023–24	Scottish Women's Premier League	32	26	4	2	113	18	82	2nd	Winners	Winners	did not qualify
2024–25	Scottish Women's Premier League	32	22	5	5	139	27	71	3rd	Winners	Winners	Round 1

== European history ==
Season	Competition	Round	Opposition	Home	Away	Aggregate
2022–23	UEFA Women's Champions League; Champions Path	QF Round 1 Semi-final	(Hungary) Ferencváros	3–1		
2022–23	UEFA Women's Champions League; Champions Path	QF Round 1 Final	(Greece) PAOK	0–4		
2022–23	UEFA Women's Champions League; Champions Path	QF Round 2	(Portugal) Benfica	2-3^{f}	1–2 (a.e.t.)	3–5
2024–25	UEFA Women's Champions League; League Path	QF Round 1 Semi-final	(England) Arsenal	0–6		
2024–25	UEFA Women's Champions League; League Path	QF Round 1 Third Place	(Spain) Atlético Madrid	0–3		

^{f} First leg.

== Honours ==
- Scottish Women's Premier League: 2021–22
  - Runners-up: 2014, 2023–24
- Scottish Women's First Division: 2008–09
- Women's Scottish Cup: 2023–24, 2024–25
  - Runners-up: 2008–09, 2010, 2022–23
- Scottish Women's Premier League Cup: 2022–23, 2023–24, 2024–25
- City of Glasgow Women's Cup: 2022 2023

== See also ==
- Old Firm
