= 2018 Scottish Women's Premier League Cup =

Tournament details
- Country: Scotland
- Teams: 16

Final positions
- Champions: Hibernian
- Runners-up: Celtic

Tournament statistics
- Matches played: 15
- Goals scored: 58 (3.87 per match)
- Top goal scorer(s): Kirsty Howat / Lizzie Arnot (5 goals)

The 2018 Scottish Women's Premier League Cup was the 17th edition of the Scottish Women's Premier League's league cup competition, which began in 2002. It was sponsored by the Scottish Building Society and officially known as the Scottish Building Society Scottish Women's Premier League Cup. The competition was contested by all 16 teams of the two divisions of the Scottish Women's Premier League (SWPL 1 and SWPL 2).

== Results ==
All results listed are published by Scottish Women's Football (SWF)

=== First round ===
The draw for the First round took place on Saturday, 27 January 2018 at Hampden Park.

25 February 2018	Forfar Farmington	3–0	Aberdeen	Forfar
1:00	C. Kilcoyne; R. Smith; D. McGinley	SWF Report		Stadium: Station Park

25 February 2018	Celtic	4–0	St Johnstone	East Kilbride
14:00	Littlejohn N. Pullar Richards	Celtic Report		Stadium: K Park Training Academy

25 February 2018	Rangers	1–0	Motherwell	Glasgow
14:00	C. Brown	SWF Report		Stadium: New Tinto Park, Govan

25 February 2018	Heart of Midlothian	0–4	Hibernian	Dalkeith
14:00		SWF Report	S. McGregor L. Tweedie K. Turner Smith	Stadium: Kings Park

25 February 2018	Glasgow City	7–0	Spartans	Glasgow
14:10	Howat J. Paton M. Foley	SWF Report		Stadium: Petershill Park, Springburn

25 February 2018	Stirling University	3–2	Central Girls Football Academy	Stirling
14:30	R. Galbraith	SWF Report	N. Welch; C. McEachran	Stadium: The Gannochy, University of Stirling

25 February 2018	Hutchison Vale	1–3	Spartans	Edinburgh
14:30	K. Williams	SWF Report	B. Beveridge; Walkingshaw; E. Santoyo-Brown	Stadium: Peffermill Playing Fields

15 March 2018	Glasgow Women	1–2	Hamilton Academical	Glasgow
	?		? ?	Stadium: Cathkin Park

=== Quarter-finals ===
The draw for the quarter-finals took place on Wednesday, 26 February 2018 at Hampden Park.

25 March 2018	Forfar Farmington	2–0	Stirling University	Forfar
12:00	K. Brough; C. Cowper			Stadium: Station Park

25 March 2018	Spartans	0–3	Glasgow City	Edinburgh
12:00			Ross; Howat; J. Paton	Stadium: Ainslie Park

25 March 2018	Hamilton Academical	0–3	Celtic	Hamilton
14:30			Giard; R. Donaldson	Stadium: New Douglas Park

25 March 2018	Hibernian	1–0	Rangers	Edinburgh
13:00	Graham			Stadium: Ainslie Park

=== Semi-finals ===
The draw for the quarter-finals took place on Wednesday, 26 March 2018 at Hampden Park.

29 April 2018	Hibernian	3–1	Glasgow City	Falkirk
2:00	Harrison		Kerr	Stadium: Falkirk Stadium

29 April 2018	Celtic	4–1	Forfar Farmington	Falkirk
15:30	N. Pullar 4'; R. Donaldson 65'; McCulloch 76'; Giard 85'		N.Davidson 42'	Stadium: Falkirk Stadium

== Final ==
20 May 2018

Hibernian	9–0	Celtic
Notley 7'; Arnot 17' (pen.) 27' 59' 80' 85'; Clark 30' (o.g.); McGregor 48'; Reilly 78'

Falkirk Stadium, Falkirk

Hibernian	Celtic

(Scotland) Hannah Reid
(Scotland) Rachel McLauchlan
(Scotland) Shannon McGregor
(Scotland) Lisa Robertson (c)
(Scotland) Emma Brownlie
(Scotland) Kirsty Smith
(Scotland) Ellis Notley
(Scotland) Chelsea Cornet
(Scotland) Amy Gallacher
(Scotland) Abi Harrison
(Scotland) Lizzie Arnot
Substitutes:
(Scotland) Jenna Fife
(Scotland) Cailin Michie
(Scotland) Clare Williamson
(Scotland) Jamie-Lee Napier
(Scotland) Kirsten Reilly
(Scotland) Lia Tweedie
(Scotland) Siobhan Hunter
Manager:
(Scotland) Grant Scott

(Scotland) Kiera Gibson
(Republic of Ireland) Keeva Keenan
(Scotland) Cheryl McCulloch
(Scotland) Georgie Rafferty
(Scotland) Colette Cavanagh
(Scotland) Rachel Donaldson
(Scotland) Natalie Ross
(Scotland) Kelly Clark (c)
(Scotland) Sarah Ewens
(Germany) Josephine Giard
(Scotland) Nicole Pullar
Substitutes:
(Scotland) Megan Cunningham
(Scotland) Rachael O'Neil
(Scotland) Claire Adams
(Scotland) Rachel Connor
(Scotland) Chloe Craig
(Republic of Ireland) Ruesha Littlejohn
Manager:
(Scotland) David Haley

== Top goalscorers ==
Rank	Player	Club	Goals
1	(Scotland) Lizzie Arnot	Hibernian	5
1	(Scotland) Kirsty Howat-Thomson	Glasgow City	5
2	(Scotland) Abi Harrison	Hibernian	3
2	(Scotland) Nicole Pullar	Celtic	3
2	(Germany) Josephine Giard	Celtic	3
2	(Scotland) Rebecca Galbraith	Stirling University	3
