= 2016 Scottish Women's Premier League 2 =

Scottish Women's Premier League 2
- Season: 2016
- Champions: Hamilton Academical
- Promoted: Hamilton Academical
- Relegated: Inverness City; Queen's Park
- Matches: 79
- Goals: 408 (5.16 per match)
- Biggest home win: Hamilton Academical 11–0 Inverness City (22 May 2016); Glasgow Girls 11–0 Inverness City (9 October 2016)
- Biggest away win: Queen's Park 0–13 Jeanfield Swifts (22 May 2016)
- Highest scoring: Queen's Park 0–13 Jeanfield Swifts (22 May 2016)
- Longest winning run: 8 matches: Glasgow Girls
- Longest unbeaten run: 8 matches: Glasgow Girls
- Longest winless run: 10 matches: Inverness City
- Longest losing run: 7 matches: Inverness City
- All statistics correct as of 23 October 2016.

The 2016 Scottish Women's Premier League 2 was the first season of the SWPL 2 as the second-highest division of women's football in Scotland. The existing Scottish Women's Premier League (with 12 teams in the 2015 season) was split into two divisions of eight teams each, SWPL 1 and SWPL 2, with both above the Scottish Women's Football League First Division (SWFL 1). The change was made to increase competitiveness in the league. SWPL 2 became the new level 2 Scottish women's league, displacing the First Division (SWFL 1) to level 3.

The restructuring had begun in 2015 by requiring four SWPL clubs to be effectively relegated. Lewis Melee quoted a manager critical of the SWF's consultation and lack of notice for the league's new clubs: "Rather than saying we need to finish 11th for our first year in the league they were having to finish 8th and they didn’t have a 6 to 12-month plan to prepare... they were probably the ones that suffered more than anyone".

The first champions of SWPL 2 were Hamilton Academical, replacing Forfar Farmington in the top tier for the 2017 season.

== Teams ==
Locations of teams in the 2016 SWPL 2

Team	Location	Home ground	Capacity	2015 position
Buchan	Maud	Pleasure Park		2nd in SWFL1
Glasgow Girls	Glasgow	Budhill Park, Shettleston		1st in SWFL1
Hamilton Academical	Hamilton	New Douglas Park	6,018	10th in SWPL
Heart of Midlothian	Edinburgh	Kings Park, Dalkeith		9th in SWPL
Hutchison Vale	Edinburgh	Saughton Enclosure		11th in SWPL
Inverness City	Inverness	Millburn Academy		12th in SWPL
Jeanfield Swifts	Perth	McDiarmid Park 3G		3rd in SWFL1
Queen's Park	Glasgow	Toryglen Regional Football Centre		4th in SWFL1

== Format ==
In the first season after the reduction to eight teams a new format is played. Teams will play each other three times, with the bottom placed team being relegated after the season. The split into a championship and relegation group is discontinued.

== Standings ==
Teams will play 21 matches each.

Pos	Team	Pld	W	D	L	GF	GA	GD	Pts	Qualification or relegation
1	Hamilton Academical (C, P)	21	17	0	4	87	25	+62	51	2017 SWPL 1
2	Heart of Midlothian	21	15	4	2	71	16	+55	49	
3	Glasgow Girls	21	16	1	4	59	21	+38	49	
4	Hutchison Vale (Note: Hutchison Vale were deducted three points for fielding an ineligible player in their win over Heart of Midlothian on 21 August 2016. The result was reversed and Hearts were awarded a 3-0 win.)	21	9	4	8	52	42	+10	31	
5	Jeanfield Swifts	21	9	1	11	70	45	+25	28	
6	Buchan	21	6	3	12	46	58	−12	21	
7	Queen's Park (R)	21	3	0	18	22	115	−93	9	2017 SWFL 1
8	Inverness City (R)	21	2	1	18	24	109	−85	7	2017 SWFL 1

Updated to match(es) played on 30 October 2016. Source: Soccerway
Rules for classification: 1) Points; 2) Goal difference; 3) Number of goals scored
(C) Champions; (P) Promoted; (R) Relegated

== Results ==
Matches 1 to 14

Home \ Away	BUC	GLG	HAM	HOM	HUT	INV	JFS	QPA
Buchan		1–5	1–2	2–2	3–3	5–0	1–4	4–3
Glasgow Girls	3–1		2–1	0–2	1–3	2–1	3–2	3–0
Hamilton Academical	5–2	2–0		1–3	5–2	11–0	4–0	5–1
Heart of Midlothian	4–1	0–2	1–0		1–1	7–0	2–1	5–0
Hutchison Vale	0–3	0–2	2–1	0–3		6–0	0–0	11–1
Inverness City	2–1	0–2	3–5	1–10	1–1		0–3	5–1
Jeanfield Swifts	7–2	0–2	2–3	1–4	2–4	6–1		5–1
Queen's Park	4–2	0–1	1–10	1–7	1–2	4–3	0–13	

Updated to match(es) played on 9 October 2016. Source: Scottish Women's Football
Legend: Blue = home team win; Yellow = draw; Red = away team win.

Matches 15 to 21

Home \ Away	BUC	GLG	HAM	HOM	HUT	INV	JFS	QPA
Buchan				1–1		5–2		3–0
Glasgow Girls	4–1				4–0	11–0	3–2	
Hamilton Academical	3–1	4–2		3–1			6–0	
Heart of Midlothian		1–1			3–0	7–0		6–0
Hutchison Vale	0–3		0–6				3–2	
Inverness City			1–6		0–5		2–6	
Jeanfield Swifts	4–3	3–5		0–1				9–0
Queen's Park		0–6	0–4		0–9	4–2		

Updated to match(es) played on 30 October 2016. Source: Scottish Women's Football
Legend: Blue = home team win; Yellow = draw; Red = away team win.
