= 2021–22 Scottish Women's Premier League 2 =

Scottish Women's Premier League 2
- Season: 2021–22
- Champions: Dundee United
- Promoted: Glasgow Women
- Matches played: 84
- Goals scored: 328 (3.9 per match)
- Biggest home win: Glasgow Women 8–1 Stirling University; Kilmarnock 7–0 Stirling University
- Biggest away win: Stirling University 0–7 Dundee United
- Highest scoring: Glasgow Women 8–1 Stirling University (9 goals)
- Longest unbeaten run: Dundee United (21 games)

The 2021–22 Scottish Women's Premier League 2 was the seventh season of the SWPL 2 as the second-highest division of women's football in Scotland, below SWPL 1 and above the SWF Championship. Originally planned to involve eight teams, the league season was played with only seven, following the sudden resignation of Forfar Farmington in August 2021 – Partick Thistle were elevated to SWPL 1 to maintain an even number of teams, leaving SWPL 2 one short.

Dundee United were the SWPL 2 champions, 20 points ahead of the runners-up Glasgow Women, who won promotion with a 3–1 win in the final match against third-placed Boroughmuir Thistle.

Two clubs were promoted from SWPL 2 and none relegated from SWPL 1 due to league expansion. The league's first promotion/relegation play-off had been planned until the expansion was confirmed in April 2022 following the SWPL clubs' majority vote to leave SWF for the SPFL in February.

== Teams ==
Team	Location	Head coach	Home ground	Capacity	2020–21 position
Boroughmuir Thistle	Edinburgh	(Scotland) Suzy Shepherd	Meggetland Sports Complex	1,000	9th
Dundee United	Dundee	(Scotland) Graeme Hart (interim)	Regional Performance Centre		4th
Glasgow Girls & Women	Glasgow	(Scotland) Craig Joyce	New Tinto Park		6th
Kilmarnock	Kilmarnock	(Scotland) Andy Gardner	Rugby Park	17,889	8th
Queen's Park	Glasgow	(Scotland) Mark Kirk	Lesser Hampden	1,000	7th
St Johnstone	Perth	(Scotland) Jason McCrindle	McDiarmid Park	10,696	5th
Stirling University	Stirling	(Scotland) Craig Beveridge	Gannochy Sports Centre	1,000	10th

Locations of teams in the SWPL 2

== League table ==
Pos	Team	Pld	W	D	L	GF	GA	GD	Pts	Qualification or relegation
1	Dundee United (C, P)	24	21	2	1	89	21	+68	65	Promotion to SWPL 1
2	Glasgow Women (P)	24	13	6	5	52	30	+22	45	Promotion to SWPL 1
3	Boroughmuir Thistle	24	12	4	8	54	38	+16	40	
4	Kilmarnock	24	9	5	10	52	51	+1	32	
5	St Johnstone	24	9	5	10	42	46	−4	32	
6	Queen's Park	24	4	4	16	26	56	−30	16	
7	Stirling University	24	2	2	20	13	86	−73	8	

Rules for classification: 1) Points; 2) Goal difference; 3) Number of goals scored
(C) Champions; (P) Promoted

== Results ==
=== Matches 1 to 12 ===
Home \ Away	BOR	DUN	GLW	KIL	QPA	STJ	STI
Boroughmuir Thistle		1–2	2–3	1–0	1–1	4–1	3–0
Dundee United	4–1		2–0	4–0	3–1	5–1	5–1
Glasgow Women	3–2	0–0		3–2	1–1	1–1	8–1
Kilmarnock	3–2	1–3	2–2		3–3	1–4	7–0
Queen's Park	1–2	0–6	0–2	2–2		0–2	0–2
St Johnstone	2–3	1–4	2–3	2–4	2–1		2–0
Stirling University	2–3	1–5	0–5	1–3	0–2	0–0	

Legend: Blue = home team win; Yellow = draw; Red = away team win.

=== Matches 13 to 24 ===
Home \ Away	BOR	DUN	GLW	KIL	QPA	STJ	STI
Boroughmuir Thistle		4–1	1–2	1–1	4–0	1–1	5–1
Dundee United	4–0		2–2	6–1	3–1	3–2	3–0
Glasgow Women	3–1	0–3		2–2	3–1	0–2	0–2
Kilmarnock	1–5	0–4	0–3		1–0	1–2	4–0
Queen's Park	1–2	1–5	0–3	1–4		1–0	4–0
St Johnstone	1–1	2–5	1–0	0–5	4–2		6–0
Stirling University	0–4	0–7	0–3	0–4	1–2	1–1	

Legend: Blue = home team win; Yellow = draw; Red = away team win.
