= 2019 Scottish Women's Premier League =

Scottish Women's Premier League 1
- Season: 2019
- Champions: Glasgow City (14th title)
- Relegated: Stirling University
- Champions League: Glasgow City
- Matches played: 84
- Goals scored: 354 (4.21 per match)
- Top goalscorer: Kirsty Howat (24 goals)
- Biggest home win: Hibernian 13–0 Forfar Farmington (8 October 2019)
- Biggest away win: Motherwell 0–10 Glasgow City (23 October 2019)
- Highest scoring: Hibernian 13–0 Forfar Farmington (8 October 2019)
- Longest winning run: 19 matches: Glasgow City
- Longest unbeaten run: 19 matches: Glasgow City
- Longest winless run: 21 matches: Stirling University
- Longest losing run: 9 matches: Stirling University
- All statistics correct as of 18 November 2019.

The 2019 Scottish Women's Premier League was the 18th season of the SWPL, the highest division of women's football in Scotland since 2002. The season started on 10 February 2019 and finished on 17 November 2019. The league was known as the Scottish Building Society Scottish Women's Premier League for sponsorship reasons.

Fixtures for the 2019 SWPL 1 season were announced on 17 December 2018.

Motherwell joined SWPL 1 as the promoted club from the 2018 SWPL 2, replacing Hamilton Academical. Glasgow City were the defending champions and retained the Scottish title in 2019. 2019 was the last full season played on a summer calendar in Scottish women's football.

== Teams ==
Locations of teams in the 2019 SWPL 1

Team	Location	Home ground	Capacity	2018 position
Celtic	Glasgow	K-Park Training Academy	1,000	3rd
Forfar Farmington	Forfar	Station Park	6,777	5th
Glasgow City	Glasgow	Petershill Park	1,000	1st
Hibernian	Edinburgh	Ainslie Park	3,000	2nd
Motherwell	Motherwell	Ravenscraig Regional Sports Facility	1,000	1st in SWPL 2
Rangers	Glasgow; Milngavie	New Tinto Park; Rangers Training Centre	2,000; 500	4th
Spartans	Edinburgh	Ainslie Park	3,000	6th
Stirling University	Stirling	Gannochy Sports Centre	1,000	7th

Source: Scottish Women's Premier League

== Personnel ==
Team	Head coach
Celtic	(Scotland) Eddie Wolecki Black
Forfar Farmington	(Scotland) Stevie Baxter
Glasgow City	(Scotland) Scott Booth
Hibernian	(Scotland) Grant Scott
Motherwell	(Scotland) Donald Jennow
Rangers	(Scotland) Amy McDonald (until July) (France) Grégory Vignal
Spartans	(Scotland) Debbi McCulloch
Stirling University	(Scotland) Craig Beveridge (Interim)

Source: Scottish Women's Premier League

== League table ==
Pos	Team	Pld	W	D	L	GF	GA	GD	Pts	Qualification or relegation
1	Glasgow City (C, Q)	21	20	0	1	104	11	+93	60	Qualification for the Champions League qualifying round
2	Hibernian	21	16	1	4	83	15	+68	49	
3	Celtic	21	16	1	4	64	19	+45	49	
4	Rangers	21	11	1	9	35	57	−22	34	
5	Spartans	21	6	4	11	25	42	−17	22	
6	Motherwell	21	5	4	12	24	67	−43	19	
7	Forfar Farmington	21	2	3	16	15	78	−63	9	
8	Stirling University (R)	21	0	2	19	14	75	−61	2	Relegation to SWPL 2

Updated to match(es) played on 18 November 2019. Source:
Rules for classification: 1) Points; 2) Goal difference; 3) Number of goals scored
(C) Champions; (Q) Qualified for the phase indicated; (R) Relegated

== Positions by round ==
Champions; Qualification for the 2020–21 Champions League qualifying round
Relegation to 2020 SWPL 2

The table lists the positions of teams after each week of matches. In order to preserve chronological progress, any postponed matches are not included in the round at which they were originally scheduled but added to the full round they were played immediately afterwards. For example, if a match is scheduled for matchday 13, but then postponed and played between days 16 and 17, it will be added to the standings for day 16.

Team ╲ Round	1	2	3	4	5	6	7	8	9	10	11	12	13	14	15	16	17	18	19	20	21
Glasgow City	5	2	2	2	1	1	1	1	1	1	1	1	1	1	1	1	1	1	1	1	1
Hibernian	3	1	1	1	3	3	2	2	3	2	2	3	3	3	2	2	2	2	2	2	2
Celtic	1	3	3	3	2	2	3	3	2	3	3	2	2	2	3	3	3	3	3	3	3
Rangers	6	4	4	4	5	5	4	5	4	4	4	4	5	5	4	4	4	4	4	4	4
Spartans	4	7	7	6	4	4	5	4	6	6	5	5	4	4	6	6	5	5	5	5	5
Motherwell	2	5	6	5	6	6	6	6	5	5	6	6	6	6	5	5	6	6	6	6	6
Forfar Farmington	8	6	5	7	7	7	7	7	7	7	7	7	7	7	7	7	7	7	7	7	7
Stirling University	7	8	8	8	8	8	8	8	8	8	8	8	8	8	8	8	8	8	8	8	8

== Results ==
=== Matches 1 to 14 ===
Home \ Away	CEL	FOR	GLA	HIB	MOT	RAN	SPA	STI
Celtic		4–0	1–2	3–0	0–0	3–1	2–0	4–0
Forfar Farmington	3–4		0–7	0–8	3–2	2–3	0–2	0–0
Glasgow City	1–0	10–1		2–1	8–0	8–0	7–1	5–1
Hibernian	2–1	13–0	0–1		7–1	4–0	2–1	3–0
Motherwell	1–2	2–0	0–10	0–4		3–3	0–0	1–0
Rangers	1–4	2–1	0–2	0–6	4–3		2–1	4–1
Spartans	1–5	1–0	0–5	0–0	3–1	0–1		4–0
Stirling University	0–4	1–1	0–3	0–4	1–4	1–4	0–3	

Updated to match(es) played on 30 October 2019. Source:
Legend: Blue = home team win; Yellow = draw; Red = away team win.

=== Matches 15 to 21 ===
Home \ Away	CEL	FOR	GLA	HIB	MOT	RAN	SPA	STI
Celtic		7–0	4–1		5–0			
Forfar Farmington			0–5	1–4	0–1		0–0	
Glasgow City					9–0		3–0	8–1
Hibernian	3–0		1–3			8–0		7–2
Motherwell				0–2		1–3		2–1
Rangers	0–3	2–1	0–4					
Spartans	1–5			0–4	2–2	0–1		
Stirling University	2–3	0–2				1–4	2–5	

Updated to match(es) played on 18 November 2019. Source:
Legend: Blue = home team win; Yellow = draw; Red = away team win.

== Statistics ==
=== Scoring ===
Rank	Player	Club	Goals
1	(Scotland) Kirsty Howat	Glasgow City	24
2	(Scotland) Sarah Ewens	Celtic	20
3	(Scotland) Jamie-Lee Napier	Hibernian	15
4	(Republic of Ireland) Clare Shine	Glasgow City	13
5	(Germany) Josephine Giard	Celtic	11
6	(Scotland) Kathleen McGovern	Celtic	10
7	(Scotland) Hayley Sinclair	Glasgow City	8
7	(Scotland) Rachael Boyle	Hibernian	8

=== Hat-tricks ===
No.	Player	For	Against	Date	Score	Ref
1	(Scotland) Kirsty Howat	Glasgow City	Spartans	17 February 2019	7–1	
2	(Scotland) Lia Tweedie	Hibernian	Rangers	17 March 2019	4–0	
3	(Republic of Ireland) Clare Shine	Glasgow City	Forfar Farmington	17 March 2019	7–0	
4	(Scotland) Jamie-Lee Napier	Hibernian	Forfar Farmington	21 April 2019	8–0	
5	(Scotland) Kirsty Howat^{4}	Glasgow City	Motherwell	21 April 2019	8–0	
6	(Scotland) Kirsty Howat^{4}	Glasgow City	Stirling University	29 September 2019	8–1	
7	(Scotland) Jamie-Lee Napier	Hibernian	Forfar Farmington	8 October 2019	13–0	
8	(Scotland) Lia Tweedie	Hibernian	Forfar Farmington	8 October 2019	13–0	
9	(Scotland) Lauren Davidson^{4}	Hibernian	Stirling University	3 November 2019	7–2	
10	(Scotland) Sarah Ewens	Celtic	Spartans	10 November 2019	5–1	

Notes

4 – Player scored four goals

== Awards ==
=== Monthly awards ===
Month	Player of the Month		Ref
Month	Player	Club	Ref
February	(Scotland) Rachel Walkingshaw	Heart of Midlothian	
March	(Scotland) Chloe Docherty	Glasgow Girls	
April	(Scotland) Michaela McAlonie	Spartans	
May	(Scotland) Neve Guthrie	Dundee United	
