= 2023–24 Scottish Women's Premier League 2 =

Scottish Women's Premier League 2
- Season: 2023–24
- Champions: Queen's Park
- Promoted: Queen's Park
- Relegated: Stirling University; Glasgow Women
- Matches played: 96
- All statistics correct as of 19 May 2024.

The 2023–24 Scottish Women's Premier League 2 was the ninth season of the SWPL 2 as the second-highest division of women's football in Scotland, below SWPL 1 and above the SWF Championship. It was the second season of operation under the auspices of the Scottish Professional Football League.

New participants were Glasgow Women (relegated from SWPL 1) and Livingston (winners of the 2022–23 SWF Championship). Eight clubs took part, playing each other four times. The winners of SWPL 2 would win automatic promotion and swap places with the 12th-placed club in SWPL 1, while the 8th-placed club in SWPL 2 would be relegated and replaced by the 2023–24 SWF Championship winners, with promotion/relegation play-offs taking place between the clubs finishing 11th in SWPL 1 and 2nd in SWPL 2 and between the clubs finishing 7th in SWPL 2 and 2nd in the Championship. The league season began on 13 August 2023 and ended on 19 May 2024.

Queen's Park won the division and gained promotion; Kilmarnock lost out to Dundee United in the play-off. At the other end of the table, Stirling University finished bottom, and Ayr United won the SWPL 2 / Championship play-off with Glasgow Women to move up and condemn their opponents to a second successive relegation.

== Teams ==
Team	Location	Manager	Home ground	Capacity	2022–23 position
Boroughmuir Thistle	Edinburgh	(Scotland) Andy Enwood	Meggetland Sports Complex	1,000	5th
Gartcairn	Airdrie	(Scotland) Billy McCall	MTC Park	300	2nd
Glasgow Women	Glasgow	(Scotland) Andy Gardner	New Tinto Park	1,000	12th in SWPL 1
Kilmarnock	Kilmarnock	(Scotland) Jim Chapman	Rugby Park	15,003	4th
Livingston	Livingston	(Scotland) Mike Ross	Almondvale Stadium	9,713	1st in SWF Championship
Queen's Park	Glasgow	(Scotland) Craig Joyce	New Tinto Park	1,000	6th
St Johnstone	Perth	(Scotland) Kevin Candy	Riverside Stadium	1,000	3rd
Stirling University	Stirling	(Scotland) Nile Robbins	University of Stirling	1,000	7th

Locations of teams in the SWPL 2

== League table ==
Pos	Team	Pld	W	D	L	GF	GA	GD	Pts	Qualification or relegation
1	Queen's Park (C, P)	28	23	3	2	95	23	+72	72	Promotion to SWPL1
2	Kilmarnock	28	14	7	7	69	38	+31	49	Qualification for the SWPL Play-off Final
3	Livingston	28	14	5	9	50	42	+8	47	
4	Boroughmuir Thistle	28	10	10	8	49	31	+18	40	
5	St Johnstone	28	10	1	17	57	61	−4	31	
6	Gartcairn	28	9	4	15	45	72	−27	31	
7	Glasgow Women (R)	28	6	8	14	31	55	−24	26	Qualification for the SWPL2 Play-off Final
8	Stirling University (R)	28	5	4	19	21	95	−74	19	Relegation to the SWF Championship

Updated to match(es) played on 19 May 2024. Source:
Rules for classification: 1) Points; 2) Goal difference; 3) Number of goals scored
(C) Champions; (P) Promoted; (R) Relegated
