= Megan Cunningham =

Scottish footballer (born 1995)

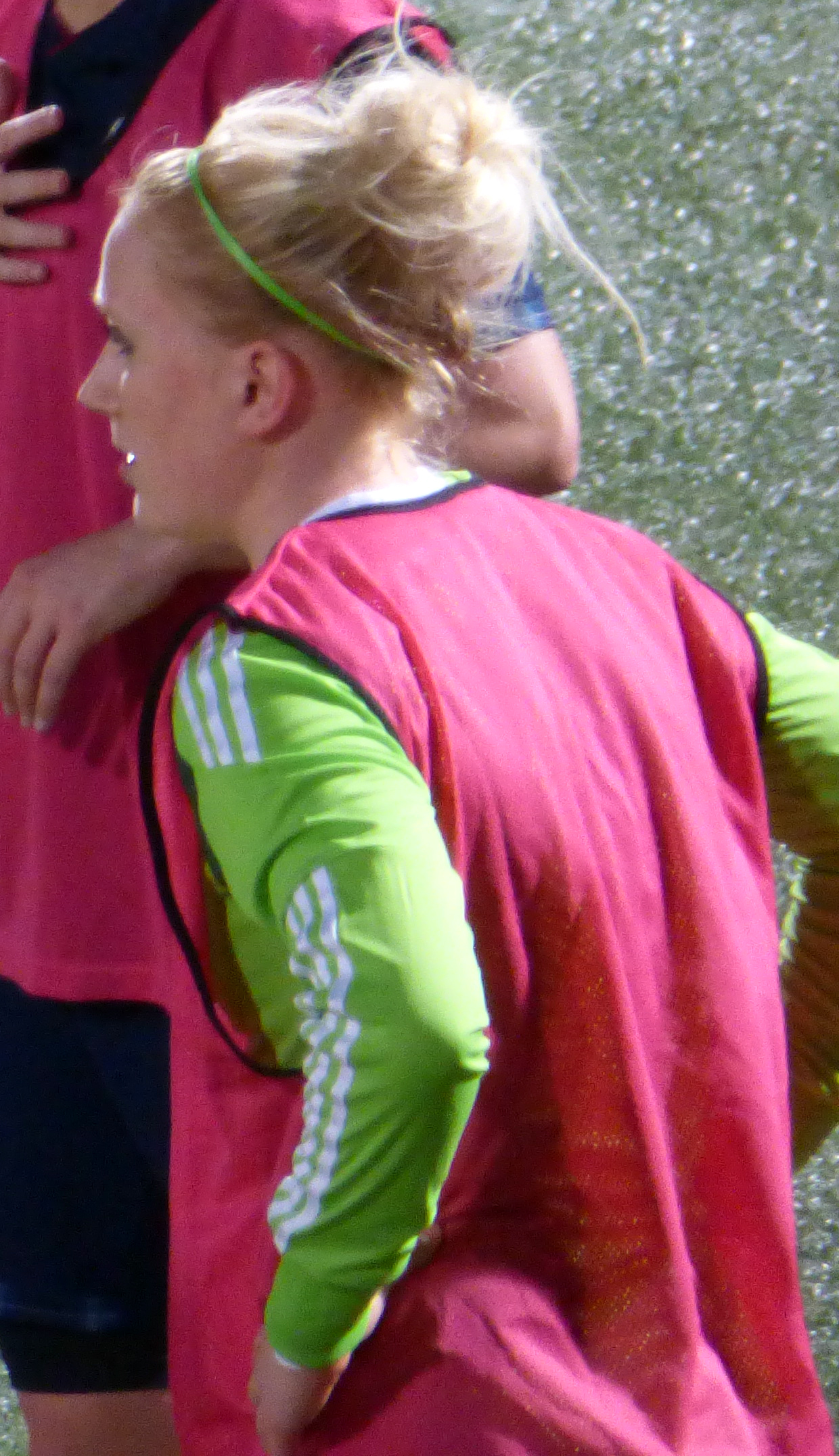

Personal information
- Date of birth: 14 July 1995 (age 31)
- Position: Goalkeeper

Team information
- Current team: Partick Thistle (on loan from Rangers)
- Number: 25

Senior career*
Years	Team	Apps	(Gls)
2009–2011	Celtic		(0)
2012–2014	Hamilton Academical		(0)
2015	Glasgow City		(0)
2016–2019	Celtic	62	(0)
2020–	Rangers	14	(0)
2022–	→ Partick Thistle (loan)	6	(0)

International career
2010–2011	Scotland U17		
2012–2014	Scotland U19		
2015	Scotland	2	(0)
- * Club domestic league appearances and goals as of 01 May 2023

Megan Cunningham (born 14 July 1995) is a Scottish football goalkeeper who plays for Partick Thistle in the Scottish Women's Premier League (SWPL), on loan from Rangers She has two caps for Scotland.

== Club career ==
Cunningham signed for Celtic in March 2009, but moved to Hamilton Academical in February 2012 to get more playing time. She moved to Glasgow City for the 2015 season before returning to Celtic for the 2016 season. Cunningham signed for Rangers in December 2019, ahead of the 2020 season. She joined Partick Thistle on loan at the start of the 2022 season.

== International career ==
Cunningham has two Scotland international caps. She made her debut on her first call-up in a friendly against Northern Ireland away on 8 February 2015, when she was subbed on in minute 63. At the 2015 Cyprus Cup she played a full match against Italy. She represented Scotland as well at under-17 level and under-19 level.
