= 2018 Scottish Women's Premier League =

Scottish Women's Premier League 1
- Season: 2018
- Champions: Glasgow City (13th title)
- Relegated: Hamilton Academical
- Champions League: Glasgow City; Hibernian
- Matches: 84
- Goals: 306 (3.64 per match)
- Top goalscorer: Abi Harrison (25 goals)
- Biggest home win: Glasgow City 6–0 Stirling University (11 February 2018); Hibernian 6–0 Forfar Farmington (20 June 2018); Glasgow City 6–0 Forfar Farmington (19 August 2018); Glasgow City 6–0 Rangers (23 September 2018); Spartans 6–0 Forfar Farmington (30 September 2018); Hibernian 7–1 Rangers (28 October 2018)
- Biggest away win: Spartans 1–7 Hibernian (3 June 2018); Stirling University 0–6 Glasgow City (3 June 2018)
- Highest scoring: Hibernian 7–2 Celtic (26 August 2018)
- Longest unbeaten run: 21 matches: Glasgow City
- All statistics correct as of 28 October 2018.

The 2018 season was the 17th season of the Scottish Women's Premier League (SWPL), the highest division of women's football in Scotland since 2002.

Glasgow City had won the 2017 SWPL1 title unbeaten, their eleventh consecutive championship. After a tight title-race with Hibernian, Glasgow City successfully retained the title, on the last matchday of the 2018 season. Hamilton were relegated from SWPL 1, while the promoted team was their Lanarkshire rivals, Motherwell.

== Teams ==
Locations of teams in the 2018 SWPL 1

| Team | Location | Home ground | Capacity | 2017 position |
|---|---|---|---|---|
| Celtic | Glasgow | K Park Training Academy, East Kilbride | 1,000 | 3rd |
| Forfar Farmington | Forfar | Station Park, Forfar | 6,777 | 1st in SWPL 2 (promoted) |
| Glasgow City | Glasgow | Petershill Park, Springburn | 1,000 | 1st (champions) |
| Hamilton Academical | Hamilton | New Douglas Park | 5,510 | 7th |
| Hibernian | Edinburgh | Ainslie Park, Edinburgh | 3,000 | 2nd |
| Rangers | Glasgow | New Tinto Park, Govan | 2,000 | 6th |
| Spartans | Edinburgh | Ainslie Park, Edinburgh | 3,000 | 5th |
| Stirling University | Stirling | The Gannochy, University of Stirling | 1,000 | 4th |

== Format ==
Teams play each other three times. The top team wins the championship and qualifies for the Champions League. The bottom placed team is relegated to the SWPL 2 at the end of the season.

== Standings ==
Teams play 21 matches each.

| Pos | Team | Pld | W | D | L | GF | GA | GD | Pts | Qualification or relegation |
|---|---|---|---|---|---|---|---|---|---|---|
| 1 | Glasgow City (C, Q) | 21 | 19 | 2 | 0 | 75 | 12 | +63 | 59 | Qualification for the Champions League Round of 32 |
| 2 | Hibernian (Q) | 21 | 18 | 2 | 1 | 80 | 17 | +63 | 56 | Qualification for the Champions League Qualifying Round |
| 3 | Celtic | 21 | 11 | 3 | 7 | 41 | 31 | +10 | 36 | |
| 4 | Rangers | 21 | 8 | 1 | 12 | 33 | 46 | −13 | 25 | |
| 5 | Forfar Farmington | 21 | 7 | 2 | 12 | 20 | 45 | −25 | 23 | |
| 6 | Spartans | 21 | 4 | 4 | 13 | 23 | 46 | −23 | 16 | |
| 7 | Stirling University | 21 | 4 | 3 | 14 | 17 | 54 | −37 | 15 | |
| 8 | Hamilton Academical (R) | 21 | 3 | 3 | 15 | 17 | 55 | −38 | 12 | Relegation to SWPL 2 |

Source: Soccerway
Rules for classification: 1) Points; 2) Goal difference; 3) Number of goals scored
(C) Champions; (Q) Qualified for the phase indicated; (R) Relegated

== Results ==
=== Matches 1 to 14 ===
| Home \ Away | CEL | FOR | GLA | HAM | HIB | RAN | SPA | STI |
|---|---|---|---|---|---|---|---|---|
| Celtic | | 2–1 | 0–3 | 4–0 | 1–3 | 3–0 | 0–0 | 1–1 |
| Forfar Farmington | 0–2 | | 1–6 | 2–1 | 0–2 | 1–0 | 0–2 | 2–2 |
| Glasgow City | 2–0 | 1–0 | | 1–0 | 1–1 | 6–0 | 3–1 | 6–0 |
| Hamilton Academical | 0–2 | 0–1 | 0–5 | | 0–5 | 0–4 | 2–0 | 2–1 |
| Hibernian | 4–2 | 6–0 | 2–2 | 5–1 | | 5–0 | 3–0 | 3–0 |
| Rangers | 3–2 | 2–4 | 0–2 | 3–0 | 1–2 | | 3–0 | 4–0 |
| Spartans | 0–5 | 1–3 | 1–4 | 2–2 | 1–7 | 1–2 | | 1–1 |
| Stirling University | 0–3 | 0–2 | 0–6 | 3–0 | 0–5 | 2–0 | 2–0 | |

Updated to match(es) played on 21 October 2018. Source: Scottish Women's Football
Legend: Blue = home team win; Yellow = draw; Red = away team win.

=== Matches 15 to 21 ===
| Home \ Away | CEL | FOR | GLA | HAM | HIB | RAN | SPA | STI |
|---|---|---|---|---|---|---|---|---|
| Celtic | | | | 4–1 | | 0–0 | 3–2 | |
| Forfar Farmington | 0–1 | | | 0–0 | 0–2 | 0–3 | | |
| Glasgow City | 3–2 | 6–0 | | | 2–1 | | 4–2 | |
| Hamilton Academical | | | 1–4 | | 2–4 | | 0–0 | 3–0 |
| Hibernian | 7–2 | | | | | 7–1 | | 4–1 |
| Rangers | | | 0–5 | 5–2 | 1–2 | | 0–1 | 2–3 |
| Spartans | | 6–0 | | | 0–2 | | | 2–0 |
| Stirling University | 1–2 | 0–3 | 0–3 | | | | | |

Updated to match(es) played on 28 October 2018. Source: Scottish Women's Football
Legend: Blue = home team win; Yellow = draw; Red = away team win.

== Statistics ==
=== Top goalscorers ===
As of 15 November 2018.

| Rank | Player | Club | Goals |
|---|---|---|---|
| 1 | (Scotland) Abi Harrison | Hibernian | 25 |
| 2 | (Scotland) Abbi Grant | Glasgow City | 15 |
| 3 | (Scotland) Rachel McLauchlan | Hibernian | 10 |
| 4 | (Scotland) Hayley Lauder | Glasgow City | 9 |
| 4 | (Scotland) Jade Gallon | Rangers | 9 |
| 5 | (Scotland) Lizzie Arnot | Hibernian | 8 |
| 5 | (Scotland) Kirsty Howat | Glasgow City | 8 |

== Awards ==
=== Monthly awards ===
| Month | Player of the Month | | References |
| Month | Player | Club | References |
|---|---|---|---|
| March | (Scotland) Chelsea McEachran | Central Girls | |
| April | (Scotland) Lauren Evans | Glasgow Girls | |
| May | (Scotland) Colette Cavanagh | Celtic | |
| June | (Scotland) Jade McDonald | St Johnstone | |
| August | (Scotland) Abbi Grant | Glasgow City | |
| September | (Scotland) Lisa Swanson | F.C. Kilmarnock | |
| October | (Scotland) Bayley Hutchison | Aberdeen | |

=== Annual awards ===
| Award | Winner | Club | References |
|---|---|---|---|
| SWPL 1 Golden Boot | (Scotland) Abi Harrison | Hibernian | |
| SWPL 1 Player of the Year | (Scotland) Nicola Docherty | Glasgow City | |
