= 2007–08 Scottish Women's Premier League =

Scottish Women's Premier League
- Season: 2007–08
- Champions: Glasgow City (2nd title)
- Relegated: Newburgh (folded); Vale of Clyde
- UEFA Women's Cup: Glasgow City
- Matches: 110
- Biggest home win: Aberdeen 12–0 Vale of Clyde / Glasgow City 12–0 Vale of Clyde
- Biggest away win: Queen's Park 2–13 Glasgow City
- Highest scoring: Queen's Park 2–13 Glasgow City

The 2007–08 Scottish Women's Premier League was the sixth season of the Scottish Women's Premier League, the top level of women's football in Scotland. Matches were played between August 2007 and June 2008.

12 teams were originally invited to contest the championship, with Queen's Park and Vale of Clyde, winners and runners-up respectively in the 2006–07 SWFL First Division, taking the places of relegated Lochee United and Hutchison Vale. However, Newburgh withdrew and folded in September 2007 (their two matches were declared void), leaving the division with 11 teams to play out the campaign. This was the first season played by Celtic in women's football, with the club having taken over existing SWPL members Arsenal North in June 2007.

Glasgow City won the championship to qualify for the 2008–09 UEFA Women's Cup by a margin of five points ahead of holders Hibernian, the only team to take points from them. Glasgow City secured the championship with a 2–1 victory over their Edinburgh rivals on the penultimate matchday, the winning goal scored by Ruesha Littlejohn; it was their second title (their first coming in 2004–05) and was the starting point of what became a run of 14 consecutive SWPL championships. With Newburgh's place already vacated for the following season, the only team to be relegated conventionally was Vale of Clyde, who only gained one point from their 20 fixtures.

== League standings ==
Pos	Team	Pld	W	D	L	GF	GA	GD	Pts	Qualification
1	Glasgow City (C)	20	19	0	1	100	14	+86	57	2008–09 UEFA Women's Cup
2	Hibernian	20	17	1	2	95	17	+78	52	
3	Celtic	20	14	1	5	62	30	+32	43	
4	Edinburgh Ladies	20	12	2	6	67	42	+25	38	
5	FC Kilmarnock	20	9	3	8	42	47	−5	30	
6	Hamilton Academical	20	8	2	10	41	59	−18	26	
7	Aberdeen	20	7	4	9	46	41	+5	25	
8	Forfar Farmington	20	5	4	11	32	47	−15	19	
9	Queen's Park	20	4	3	13	42	73	−31	15	
10	Raith Rovers (R)	20	4	1	15	28	76	−48	13	
11	Vale of Clyde	20	0	1	19	11	120	−109	1	Relegation to 2008–09 SWFL First Division

Rules for classification: 1) Points; 2) Goal difference; 3) Number of goals scored
(C) Champions; (R) Relegated
