= 2017 Scottish Women's Premier League 2 =

== SWPL 2 ==
Scottish Women's Premier League 2
- Season: 2017
- Champions: Forfar Farmington
- Promoted: Forfar Farmington
- Relegated: Buchan Ladies, East Fife
- Matches played: 24
- Goals scored: 85 (3.54 per match)
- Top goalscorer: Danni McGinley (22 goals)
- Biggest home win: Forfar Farmington 5–0 Hutchison Vale
- Biggest away win: East Fife 0–4 Glasgow Girls
- Highest scoring: Forfar Farmington 5–3 Motherwell
- Longest winning run: 4 matches: Forfar Farmington
- Longest unbeaten run: 6 matches: Forfar Farmington
- Longest winless run: 4 matches: Jeanfield Swifts
- Longest losing run: 4 matches: Jeanfield Swifts

The 2017 Scottish Women's Premier League 2 was the second season of the SWPL 2 as the second-highest division of women's football in Scotland, below SWPL 1 and above SWFL 1.

== Teams ==
Locations of teams in the 2017 SWPL 2

Team	Location	Home ground	Capacity	2016 position
Buchan	Maud	Pleasure Park		6th
East Fife	Leven	King George V Park,	1,000	1st in SWFL First Division North (promoted)
Forfar Farmington	Forfar	Station Park,	6,777	8th in SWPL 1 (relegated)
Glasgow Girls	Glasgow	Budhill Park, Shettleston		3rd
Heart of Midlothian	Edinburgh	Kings Park, Dalkeith		2nd
Hutchison Vale	Edinburgh	Saughton Enclosure		4th
Motherwell	Wishaw	Wishaw Sports Centre		1st in SWFL First Division South (promoted)
Jeanfield Swifts	Perth	McDiarmid Park 3G		5th

== Format ==
Teams played each other three times, with the bottom two teams being relegated and the winning team being promoted.

== Standings ==
Teams played 21 matches each.

Pos	Team	Pld	W	D	L	GF	GA	GD	Pts	Qualification or relegation
1	Forfar Farmington (C, P)	21	16	4	1	64	15	+49	52	2018 SWPL 1
2	Glasgow Girls	21	12	4	5	46	25	+21	40	
3	Motherwell	21	11	3	7	47	43	+4	36	
4	Hutchison Vale	21	10	2	9	29	34	−5	32	
5	Jeanfield Swifts	21	10	1	10	39	35	+4	31	
6	Heart of Midlothian	21	8	3	10	41	31	+10	27	
7	East Fife (R)	21	3	5	13	19	50	−31	14	2018 SWFL 1
8	Buchan (R)	21	3	0	18	20	72	−52	9	2018 SWFL 1

Updated to match(es) played on 7 May 2017. Source: Soccerway
Rules for classification: 1) Points; 2) Goal difference; 3) Number of goals scored
(C) Champions; (P) Promoted; (R) Relegated

== Results ==
=== Matches 1 to 14 ===
Home \ Away	BUC	EFI	FOR	GLG	HOM	HUT	JFS	MOT
Buchan				0–1		2–1	5–2	
East Fife	1–0			0–4	0–1			
Forfar Farmington		4–1				5–0		5–3
Glasgow Girls			0–2		1–4			2–1
Heart of Midlothian	3–1		1–1				2–0	
Hutchison Vale		3–0		1–2				0–3
Jeanfield Swifts		3–0	1–2			3–4		
Motherwell	4–1				2–0		0–3	

Updated to match(es) played on 7 May 2017. Source: Scottish Women's Football
Legend: Blue = home team win; Yellow = draw; Red = away team win.

=== Matches 15 to 21 ===
Home \ Away	BUC	EFI	FOR	GLG	HOM	HUT	JFS	MOT
Buchan								
East Fife								
Forfar Farmington								
Glasgow Girls								
Heart of Midlothian								
Hutchison Vale								
Jeanfield Swifts								
Motherwell								

Updated to match(es) played on unknown. Source: Scottish Women's Football
Legend: Blue = home team win; Yellow = draw; Red = away team win.

== Annual awards ==
Award	Winner	Club	References
SWPL 2 Golden Boot	(Scotland) Danni McGinley	Jeanfield Swifts / Forfar Farmington	
