= Josephine Giard =

German footballer

Personal information
- Full name: Josephine Giard
- Date of birth: 22 March 1996 (age 30)
- Place of birth: Rostock, Germany
- Position: Forward

Team information
- Current team: Hamilton Academical
- Number: 9

Youth career
- –2013: FSV Gütersloh

Senior career*
Years	Team	Apps	(Gls)
2013–2017	FSV Gütersloh	87	(33)
2018–2020	Celtic	7	(15)
2020–	Hamilton Academical	22	(8)
- * Club domestic league appearances and goals as of 20:00, 01 May 2023 (UTC)

Josephine Giard (born 22 March 1996) is a German footballer who plays as a forward for Scottish Women's Premier League club Hamilton Academical. She previously played for FSV Gütersloh in Germany and in Scotland with Celtic. She plays football while wearing an insulin pump as she was diagnosed with diabetes as a child. She said in an interview on Scottish football show A View From The Terrace that she likes to be open with this to encourage other people dealing with the condition to feel confident in playing.

== Club career ==
=== FSV Gütersloh ===
From 2013 to 2017, Giard played for FSV Gütersloh in the 2. Frauen-Bundesliga. On 1 September 2013, she made her senior debut for the club and scored the team's fourth goal in a 4–0 win over Halle in the first round of the DFB-Pokal. On 8 September 2013, she made her league debut in a 1–0 loss to VfL Wolfsburg II. Giard made a total of 98 appearances during her 5 years at Gütersloh, scoring 39 goals.

=== Celtic ===
On 23 February 2018, Giard left Gütersloh to join Scottish Women's Premier League (SWPL) club Celtic. On 25 February 2018, she made her debut in a 4–0 home victory against St Johnstone in the first round of the SWPL Cup. On 11 March 2018, she made her league debut in a 2–0 win over Forfar Farmington. On 25 March 2018, she scored twice in a 3–0 away victory against Hamilton Academical in the second round of the SWPL Cup. Her first goal for Celtic was also the team's 1,000th goal in all competitions since it was established in 2007.

=== Hamilton Academical ===
Giard signed for Hamilton Academical in the second tier of the SWPL in November 2020, after leaving Celtic earlier that month.

== Career statistics ==
=== Club ===
As of 18 October 2020.

Club	League	Season	League		Cup (Note: Includes the DFB-Pokal and the Scottish Women's Cup)		League Cup (Note: Includes the Scottish Women's Premier League Cup)		Continental		Total	
Club	League	Season	Apps	Goals	Apps	Goals	Apps	Goals	Apps	Goals	Apps	Goals
FSV Gütersloh	2. Frauen-Bundesliga	2013–14	19	1	2	1	—		—		21	2
FSV Gütersloh	2. Frauen-Bundesliga	2014–15	21	6	4	3	—		—		25	9
FSV Gütersloh	2. Frauen-Bundesliga	2015–16	17	3	1	0	—		—		18	3
FSV Gütersloh	2. Frauen-Bundesliga	2016–17	20	9	2	0	—		—		22	9
FSV Gütersloh	2. Frauen-Bundesliga	2017–18	10	14	2	2	—		—		12	16
Total			87	33	11	6	0	0	0	0	98	39
Celtic	SWPL 1	2018	7	4	0	0	3	3	—		10	7
Celtic	SWPL 1	2019		11	0	0			-			11
Total			7	15	0	0	3	3	0	0	10	15
Career total			94	37	11	6	3	3	0	0	108	48
