= 2005–06 Scottish Women's Premier League =

Scottish Women's Premier League
- Season: 2005–06
- Champions: Hibernian (2nd title)
- Relegated: Cove Rangers; Queen's Park
- UEFA Women's Cup: Hibernian
- Matches: 132
- Biggest home win: Whitehill Welfare 14–0 Cove Rangers
- Biggest away win: Cove Rangers 0–8 Hibernian
- Highest scoring: Whitehill Welfare 14–0 Cove Rangers
- Longest winning run: Hibernian, 15 (20 August 2005 – 29 April 2006)
- Longest unbeaten run: Hibernian, 22 (20 August 2005 – 3 June 2006)

The 2005–06 Scottish Women's Premier League was the fourth season of the Scottish Women's Premier League, the top level of women's football in Scotland. Matches were played between August 2005 and June 2006.

12 teams contested the championship, with Arsenal North and Forfar Farmington, winners and runners-up respectively in the 2004–05 SWFL First Division, taking the places of relegated Clyde and East Kilbride.

Hibernian won the title with an unbeaten record (20 wins, 2 draws) by a margin of three points ahead of holders Glasgow City, to qualify for the 2006–07 UEFA Women's Cup. It was the club's second SWPL title overall. Cove Rangers and Queen's Park were relegated.

== League standings ==
Pos	Team	Pld	W	D	L	GF	GA	GD	Pts	Qualification
1	Hibernian (C)	22	20	2	0	112	19	+93	62	2006–07 UEFA Women's Cup
2	Glasgow City	22	19	2	1	75	21	+54	59	
3	FC Kilmarnock	22	16	3	3	60	24	+36	51	
4	Newburgh	22	12	4	6	49	28	+21	40	
5	Hamilton Academical	22	12	3	7	46	31	+15	39	
6	Raith Rovers	22	6	5	11	37	58	−21	23	
7	Whitehill Welfare	22	6	4	12	40	45	−5	22	
8	Forfar Farmington	22	6	2	14	33	59	−26	20	
9	Aberdeen	22	4	6	12	33	56	−23	18	
10	Arsenal North	22	4	3	15	21	60	−39	15	
11	Cove Rangers (R)	22	3	5	14	29	87	−58	14	Relegation to 2006–07 SWFL First Division
12	Queen's Park (R)	22	3	3	16	23	70	−47	12	Relegation to 2006–07 SWFL First Division

Rules for classification: 1) Points; 2) Goal difference; 3) Number of goals scored
(C) Champions; (R) Relegated
