= 2022–23 Scottish Women's Premier League =

Scottish Women's Premier League 1
- Season: 2022–23
- Champions: Glasgow City
- Relegated: Glasgow Women
- Champions League: Glasgow City; Celtic
- Matches played: 168
- Goals scored: 621 (3.7 per match)
- Biggest home win: Rangers 14–0 Glasgow Women (7 August 2022)
- Biggest away win: Glasgow Women 0–10 Rangers (4 December 2022)
- Highest scoring: Rangers 14–0 Glasgow Women (7 August 2022)
- Highest attendance: 15,822 Celtic v Hearts (21 May 2023)
- All statistics correct as of 4 May 2023.

The 2022–23 Scottish Women's Premier League was the 22nd season of the SWPL, the highest division of women's football in Scotland since 2002. In February 2022, a majority of SWPL clubs voted to leave the Scottish Women's Football association (under the auspices of the Scottish Football Association); from 2022–23 onwards, the two divisions will be administered by the Scottish Professional Football League.

Rangers were the defending champions, after winning their first women's Scottish title in 2021–22 by beating the 15-time champions Glasgow City. Dundee United and Glasgow Women had won promotion to SWPL 1.

The league was enlarged to 12 clubs from 10 in the preceding season. A 12-club "split" format returned, with a double round-robin before the "split", then another double round-robin of the top six and bottom six clubs respectively. The SWPL previously used a "split" format between the 2012 and 2015 seasons. The 12th-placed club would be relegated and replaced by the SWPL 2 winner, with a promotion/relegation play-off taking place between the clubs finishing 11th in SWPL 1 and 2nd in SWPL 2. The league season began on 7 August 2022 and ended on 21 May 2023.

Glasgow City won the championship on the last day of the season, Lauren Davidson scoring in stoppage time for a 1–0 victory over Rangers at Ibrox Stadium to stay ahead of Celtic, despite the Hoops' simultaneous home win over Hearts which put them in a title-winning position for part of the day (Rangers could also have retained the title with a win). City had been in first place and unbeaten at the split, but lost twice to Celtic and once to Rangers as the gap closed between the three clubs, leading to the dramatic conclusion. At the other end of the table, Glasgow Women were out of their depth and relegated having lost every match.

== Teams ==
Team	Location	Manager	Home ground	Capacity	2021–22 position
Aberdeen	Cove Bay	(Scotland) Emma Hunter (Scotland) Gavin Beith	Balmoral Stadium	2,602	5th
Celtic	Airdrie	(Spain) Fran Alonso	Excelsior Stadium	10,101	3rd
Dundee United	Dundee	(Scotland) Graeme Hart	Gussie Park	TBC	1st (SWPL2)
Glasgow City	Springburn	(Scotland) Leanne Ross	Petershill Park	1,000	2nd
Glasgow Women	Glasgow	(Scotland) Andy Gardner	New Tinto Park	1,000	2nd (SWPL2)
Hamilton Academical	Hamilton	(Scotland) Gary Doctor	New Douglas Park	6,018	10th
Heart of Midlothian	Edinburgh	(Spain) Eva Olid	Oriam	1,000	8th
Hibernian	Edinburgh	(Scotland) Dean Gibson	Meadowbank Stadium	TBC	4th
Motherwell	Motherwell	(Scotland) Paul Brownlie (Scotland) Leanne Crichton	Alliance Park	500	7th
Partick Thistle	Springburn	(Scotland) Brian Graham	Petershill Park	1,000	9th
Rangers	Milngavie	(Scotland) Malky Thomson	Broadwood Stadium	8,086	1st
Spartans	Edinburgh	(Scotland) Debbi McCulloch	Ainslie Park	3,000	6th

Locations of teams in the SWPL 1

== Regular season ==
Pos	Team	Pld	W	D	L	GF	GA	GD	Pts	Qualification or relegation
1	Glasgow City	22	20	2	0	94	7	+87	62	Qualification for the Top six
2	Celtic	22	18	2	2	90	4	+86	56	Qualification for the Top six
3	Rangers	22	17	4	1	89	5	+84	55	Qualification for the Top six
4	Heart of Midlothian	22	12	4	6	33	19	+14	40	Qualification for the Top six
5	Hibernian	22	9	5	8	45	34	+11	32	Qualification for the Top six
6	Partick Thistle	22	9	4	9	37	50	−13	31	Qualification for the Top six
7	Motherwell	22	8	6	8	28	39	−11	30	Qualification for the Bottom six
8	Spartans	22	7	5	10	19	38	−19	26	Qualification for the Bottom six
9	Dundee United	22	5	2	15	21	61	−40	17	Qualification for the Bottom six
10	Aberdeen	22	4	3	15	20	56	−36	15	Qualification for the Bottom six
11	Hamilton Academical	22	4	1	17	20	74	−54	13	Qualification for the Bottom six
12	Glasgow Women	22	0	0	22	6	115	−109	0	Qualification for the Bottom six

Rules for classification: 1) Points; 2) Goal difference; 3) Number of goals scored

Home \ Away	ABE	CEL	DUN	GLA	GLW	HAM	HOM	HIB	MOT	PAR	RAN	SPA
Aberdeen		0–3	1–2	0–7	2–0	2–0	0–1	1–3	1–3	2–2	0–8	1–1
Celtic	3–0		7–0	0–1	7–0	6–0	3–0	9–0	0–0	8–0	3–0	4–0
Dundee United	1–2	0–4		1–8	2–1	3–2	0–2	1–3	1–1	0–1	0–4	2–1
Glasgow City	2–1	2–1	7–0		11–0	6–0	2–0	2–1	3–0	8–1	1–1	7–0
Glasgow Women	0–1	0–8	0–4	0–5		3–4	0–3	0–6	0–2	1–8	0–10	0–2
Hamilton Academical	3–1	0–7	2–2	0–6	4–0		0–1	0–4	1–3	1–5	0–5	0–1
Heart of Midlothian	3–0	1–2	2–0	0–3	3–0	5–0		1–1	1–0	3–1	0–0	2–0
Hibernian	0–0	0–2	4–1	0–4	7–0	4–0	1–1		2–3	0–0	0–1	1–2
Motherwell	4–1	0–8	2–1	0–1	4–0	2–1	1–1	0–2		1–1	0–7	2–2
Partick Thistle	4–3	0–2	1–0	1–4	6–0	1–0	1–2	0–4	1–0		0–6	3–0
Rangers	4–1	0–0	5–0	0–0	14–0	6–0	2–0	4–0	4–0	5–0		2–0
Spartans	2–0	0–3	1–0	0–4	2–1	1–2	2–1	2–2	0–0	0–0	0–1	

Legend: Blue = home team win; Yellow = draw; Red = away team win.

== Top six ==
Pos	Team	Pld	W	D	L	GF	GA	GD	Pts	Qualification or relegation
1	Glasgow City (C)	32	27	2	3	112	18	+94	83	Qualification for the Champions League first round
2	Celtic	32	26	3	3	115	11	+104	81	Qualification for the Champions League first round
3	Rangers	32	24	6	2	111	9	+102	78	
4	Heart of Midlothian	32	14	7	11	39	42	−3	49	
5	Hibernian	32	11	6	15	54	51	+3	39	
6	Partick Thistle	32	9	5	18	42	73	−31	32	

Rules for classification: 1) Points; 2) Goal difference; 3) Number of goals scored
(C) Champions

Home \ Away	CEL	GLA	HOM	HIB	PAR	RAN
Celtic		3–1	2–0	3–0	2–0	0–1
Glasgow City	2–4		3–0	2–1	2–1	1–2
Heart of Midlothian	0–6	0–2		2–1	1–1	0–6
Hibernian	1–2	0–2	1–1		3–1	0–1
Partick Thistle	1–2	0–2	0–1	1–2		0–5
Rangers	1–1	0–1	1–1	2–0	3–0	

Legend: Blue = home team win; Yellow = draw; Red = away team win.

== Bottom six ==
Pos	Team	Pld	W	D	L	GF	GA	GD	Pts	Qualification or relegation
7	Spartans	32	16	6	10	48	51	−3	54	
8	Motherwell	32	13	8	11	52	53	−1	47	
9	Aberdeen	32	9	3	20	39	77	−38	30	
10	Dundee United	32	8	5	19	45	76	−31	29	
11	Hamilton Academical (Q)	32	8	3	21	38	93	−55	27	Qualification for the SWPL1 relegation/promotion play-off
12	Glasgow Women (R)	32	0	0	32	9	150	−141	0	Relegation to SWPL2

Rules for classification: 1) Points; 2) Goal difference; 3) Number of goals scored
(Q) Qualified for the phase indicated; (R) Relegated

Home \ Away	ABE	DUN	GLW	HAM	MOT	SPA
Aberdeen		1–0	5–1	2–1	0–2	1–2
Dundee United	3–4		5–0	1–1	4–2	0–1
Glasgow Women	1–3	0–7		1–3	0–3	0–1
Hamilton Academical	2–1	1–1	2–0		1–4	2–4
Motherwell	3–0	1–1	4–0	1–3		2–3
Spartans	6–2	4–2	2–0	4–2	2–2	

Legend: Blue = home team win; Yellow = draw; Red = away team win.
