= 2006–07 Scottish Women's Premier League =

Scottish Women's Premier League
- Season: 2006–07
- Champions: Hibernian (3rd title)
- Relegated: Lochee United; Hutchison Vale
- UEFA Women's Cup: Hibernian
- Matches: 132
- Biggest home win: Glasgow City 10–0 Hutchison Vale; Aberdeen 10–0 Hutchison Vale
- Biggest away win: Hutchison Vale 0–10 Hibernian
- Highest scoring: Arsenal North 6–6 Newburgh
- Longest winning run: Hibernian, 22 (19 August 2006 – 2 June 2007)
- Longest unbeaten run: Hibernian, 22 (19 August 2006 – 2 June 2007)

The 2006–07 Scottish Women's Premier League was the fifth season of the Scottish Women's Premier League, the top level of women's football in Scotland. Matches were played between August 2006 and June 2007.

12 teams contested the championship, with Lochee United and Hutchison Vale, winners and third place respectively in the 2005–06 SWFL First Division (runners-up Vale of Clyde remained in the lower level), taking the places of relegated Cove Rangers and Queen's Park. Whitehill Welfare changed their name to Edinburgh Ladies.

Reigning champions Hibernian retained the title with a perfect record of 22 wins and by a margin of eight points ahead of Glasgow City, to qualify for the 2007–08 UEFA Women's Cup. It was their third SWPL title overall (and to date, their last). Hibs also won the 2006–07 Scottish Women's Cup to complete the 'double'. Lochee United and Hutchison Vale (who only gained three points from their 22 fixtures) were relegated.

== League standings ==
Pos	Team	Pld	W	D	L	GF	GA	GD	Pts	Qualification
1	Hibernian (C)	22	22	0	0	115	17	+98	66	2007–08 UEFA Women's Cup
2	Glasgow City	22	19	1	2	92	19	+73	58	
3	Edinburgh Ladies	22	16	0	6	73	31	+42	48	
4	Newburgh	22	13	5	4	67	41	+26	44	
5	FC Kilmarnock	22	10	4	8	51	38	+13	34	
6	Aberdeen	22	8	4	10	55	55	0	28	
7	Hamilton Academical	22	8	4	10	42	55	−13	28	
8	Raith Rovers	22	9	1	12	33	54	−21	28	
9	Forfar Farmington	22	7	2	13	37	62	−25	23	
10	Arsenal North	22	3	3	16	45	79	−34	12	
11	Lochee United (R)	22	4	0	18	22	79	−57	12	Relegation to 2007–08 SWFL First Division
12	Hutchison Vale (R)	22	1	0	21	10	112	−102	3	Relegation to 2007–08 SWFL First Division

Rules for classification: 1) Points; 2) Goal difference; 3) Number of goals scored
(C) Champions; (R) Relegated
