= 2020–21 Scottish Women's Premier League =

Scottish Women's Premier League 1
- Season: 2020–21
- Champions: Glasgow City (15th title)
- Champions League: Glasgow City; Celtic
- Matches played: 84
- Goals scored: 344 (4.1 per match)
- Top goalscorer: Lizzie Arnot (16 goals)
- Biggest home win: Rangers 11–0 Forfar Farmington (25 April 2021)
- Biggest away win: Heart of Midlothian 0–10 Celtic (1 November 2020)
- Highest scoring: Rangers 11–0 Forfar Farmington (25 April 2021)
- Longest winning run: Seven games: Glasgow City
- Longest unbeaten run: 14 games: Glasgow City
- Longest winless run: 11 games: Forfar Farmington
- Longest losing run: 10 games: Forfar Farmington

The 2020–21 Scottish Women's Premier League was the 20th season of the SWPL, the highest division of women's football in Scotland since 2002. The league season was played with eight teams. Glasgow City were the defending champions, having won the last completed championship in 2019. The league was known as the Scottish Building Society Scottish Women's Premier League for sponsorship reasons.

The previous season, 2020, was interrupted by the coronavirus pandemic and was subsequently declared null and void. Following this cancellation, Scottish Women's Football reverted to the winter-season format last used in 2008–09. The new season started on 18 October 2020 and concluded on 4 July 2021. It had been agreed that there would be no relegation from SWPL 1, and that there would be 10 teams in the top division in 2021–22. The 2020–21 season was interrupted for more than three months by the pandemic; SWPL 1 played no games between January and March.

Glasgow City won the championship by three points from Celtic, the runners-up. This was Glasgow City's 14th national league title in succession, the most in Scottish senior football history, and five fewer than the world record in women's football at the time, the 19 titles achieved by SFK of Bosnia-Herzegovina.

== Teams ==
Locations of teams in the 2020–21 SWPL 1

Team	Location	Head coach	Home ground	Capacity	2019 position
Celtic	East Kilbride	(Spain) Fran Alonso	K-Park Training Academy	1,000	3rd
Forfar Farmington	Forfar	(Northern Ireland) Ryan McConville	Station Park	6,777	7th
Glasgow City	Cumbernauld	(Scotland) Scott Booth	Broadwood Stadium	8,086	1st
Heart of Midlothian	Edinburgh	(Northern Ireland) Andy Kirk	Oriam	1,000	1st in SWPL 2
Hibernian	Edinburgh	(Scotland) Dean Gibson	Ainslie Park	3,000	2nd
Motherwell	Airdrie	(Scotland) Eddie Wolecki Black	Excelsior Stadium	10,101	6th
Rangers	Milngavie	(Scotland) Malky Thomson	Rangers Training Centre	500	4th
Spartans	Edinburgh	(Scotland) Debbi McCulloch	Ainslie Park	3,000	5th

== League table ==
Pos	Team	Pld	W	D	L	GF	GA	GD	Pts	Qualification or relegation
1	Glasgow City (C)	21	18	2	1	77	16	+61	56	Qualification for the Champions League first round
2	Celtic	21	17	2	2	76	12	+64	53	Qualification for the Champions League first round
3	Rangers	21	16	0	5	76	10	+66	48	
4	Hibernian	21	9	2	10	42	27	+15	29	
5	Spartans	21	9	2	10	29	42	−13	29	
6	Motherwell	21	4	0	17	18	78	−60	12	
7	Forfar Farmington	21	3	2	16	17	90	−73	11	Withdrew from SWPL after season
8	Heart of Midlothian	21	2	2	17	9	69	−60	8	

Rules for classification: 1) Points; 2) Goal difference; 3) Number of goals scored
(C) Champions

== Positions by round ==
Champions and UEFA Champions League first round
UEFA Champions League first round

The table lists the positions of teams after each week of matches. In order to preserve chronological progress, any postponed matches are not included in the round at which they were originally scheduled but added to the full round they were played immediately afterwards. For example, if a match is scheduled for matchday 13, but then postponed and played between days 16 and 17, it will be added to the standings for day 16.

Team ╲ Round	1	2	3	4	5	6	7	8	9	10	11	12	13	14	15	16	17	18	19	20	21
Glasgow City	3	1	1	1	1	1	2	2	2	1	1	1	1	1	1	1	1	1	1	1	1
Celtic	7	4	3	2	2	3	3	3	3	3	3	3	3	2	3	3	3	2	2	2	2
Rangers	1	3	2	3	3	2	1	1	1	2	2	2	2	3	2	2	2	3	3	3	3
Hibernian	4	2	4	4	4	5	4	6	4	4	5	5	5	5	5	4	4	5	5	5	4
Spartans	5	6	6	6	5	6	5	4	5	5	4	4	4	4	4	5	5	4	4	4	5
Motherwell	6	7	7	7	7	7	7	7	7	8	7	7	7	7	7	7	7	6	6	6	6
Forfar Farmington	2	5	5	5	6	4	6	5	6	6	6	6	6	6	6	6	6	7	7	7	7
Heart of Midlothian	8	8	8	8	8	8	8	8	8	7	8	8	8	8	8	8	8	8	8	8	8

== Results ==
=== Matches 1 to 14 ===
Home \ Away	CEL	FOR	GLA	HOM	HIB	MOT	RAN	SPA
Celtic		2–2	0–3	3–0	3–1	3–0	1–0	1–0
Forfar Farmington	0–8		0–7	3–0	0–5	4–2	1–3	1–2
Glasgow City	2–0	8–1		5–0	3–2	8–0	0–5	3–1
Heart of Midlothian	0–10	1–1	0–4		1–0	0–3	0–6	1–2
Hibernian	2–6	3–0	1–2	6–0		3–2	0–1	2–1
Motherwell	0–5	2–3	0–3	2–1	0–6		0–6	0–2
Rangers	0–1	11–0	0–2	5–1	1–0	9–0		5–0
Spartans	1–5	1–0	1–3	3–0	2–0	3–1	0–1	

Legend: Blue = home team win; Yellow = draw; Red = away team win.

=== Matches 15 to 21 ===
Home \ Away	CEL	FOR	GLA	HOM	HIB	MOT	RAN	SPA
Celtic		10–0	0–0					4–0
Forfar Farmington				1–2		0–1	0–4	
Glasgow City		8–0		4–1	0–0		2–0	
Heart of Midlothian	0–3				0–2	0–1		1–1
Hibernian	0–1	7–0					0–3	1–1
Motherwell	0–8		2–4		0–1			2–3
Rangers	1–2			4–0		6–0		
Spartans		3–0	2–6				0–5	

Legend: Blue = home team win; Yellow = draw; Red = away team win.

== Statistics ==
=== Scoring ===
As of 10 June 2021

Rank	Player	Club	Goals
1	(Scotland) Lizzie Arnot	Rangers	16
2	(Scotland) Sarah Ewens	Celtic	14
3	(Scotland) Zoe Ness	Rangers	12
4	(Scotland) Kirsty Howat	Glasgow City; Rangers	11
5	(Republic of Ireland) Aoife Colvill	Glasgow City	9
5	(Scotland) Donna Paterson	Forfar Farmington	9
7	(Scotland) Chloe Craig	Celtic	8
7	(Costa Rica) Priscila Chinchilla	Glasgow City	8
9	(South Africa) Ode Fulutudilu	Glasgow City	7
9	(Scotland) Becky Galbraith	Spartans	7

=== Hat-tricks ===
No.	Player	For	Against	Date	Score	Ref
1	(Scotland) Zoe Ness	Rangers	Heart of Midlothian	18 October 2020	5–1	
2	(Scotland) Kirsty Howat	Glasgow City	Forfar Farmington	1 November 2020	8–1	
3	(Scotland) Donna Paterson	Forfar Farmington	Heart of Midlothian	8 November 2020	3–0	
