= 2016 Scottish Women's Premier League =

Scottish Women's Premier League 1
- Season: 2016
- Champions: Glasgow City (11th title)
- Relegated: Forfar Farmington
- Champions League: Glasgow City; Hibernian
- Matches: 80
- Goals: 302 (3.78 per match)
- Biggest home win: Hibernian 9–0 Rangers (28 August 2016)
- Biggest away win: Spartans 0–8 Glasgow City (20 April 2016)
- Highest scoring: Nine goals: Hibernian 9–0 Rangers (28 August 2016); Glasgow City 8–1 Stirling University (23 May 2016)
- Longest winning run: 10 matches: Glasgow City
- Longest unbeaten run: 10 matches: Glasgow City
- Longest winless run: 13 matches: Forfar Farmington
- Longest losing run: 13 matches: Forfar Farmington
- All statistics correct as of 23 October 2016.

The 2016 Scottish Women's Premier League was the 15th season of the SWPL, the highest division of women's football in Scotland since 2002. For the first time, the league was split into two divisions of eight teams each, SWPL 1 and SWPL 2.

The split into two divisions reduced the number of top-division teams from 12 to 8. The change was made to increase competitiveness in the league.

At the end of the season in October 2016, Glasgow City won the championship, ahead of Hibernian. City became the first senior football club to win ten Scottish league titles in succession. Forfar Farmington were relegated, being replaced by Hamilton Academical for the 2017 season.

== Teams ==
Locations of teams in the 2016 SWPL 1.

| Team | Location | Home ground | Capacity | 2015 position |
|---|---|---|---|---|
| Aberdeen | Aberdeen | Heathryfold Park | 2,200 | 4th |
| Celtic | Glasgow | K Park Training Academy, East Kilbride | 1,000 | 3rd |
| Forfar Farmington | Forfar | Station Park | 6,777 | 8th |
| Glasgow City | Glasgow | Excelsior Stadium, Airdrie | 10,100 | 1st |
| Hibernian | Edinburgh | Albyn Park, Broxburn | 1,000 | 2nd |
| Rangers | Glasgow | Tinto Park | 2,000 | 6th |
| Spartans | Edinburgh | Spartans Academy | 2,000 | 5th |
| Stirling University | Stirling | University of Stirling | 1,000 | 7th |

== Format ==
In the first season after the reduction to eight teams a new format is played. Teams will play each other three times, with the bottom placed team being relegated after the season. The split into a championship and relegation group is discontinued.

== Standings ==
Teams will play 21 matches each.

| Pos | Team | Pld | W | D | L | GF | GA | GD | Pts | Qualification or relegation |
|---|---|---|---|---|---|---|---|---|---|---|
| 1 | Glasgow City (C) | 21 | 20 | 0 | 1 | 78 | 12 | +66 | 60 | 2017–18 Champions League |
| 2 | Hibernian (Q) | 21 | 17 | 1 | 3 | 76 | 17 | +59 | 52 | 2017–18 Champions League |
| 3 | Celtic | 21 | 13 | 0 | 8 | 50 | 30 | +20 | 39 | |
| 4 | Stirling University | 21 | 9 | 1 | 11 | 28 | 45 | −17 | 28 | |
| 5 | Rangers | 21 | 9 | 0 | 12 | 35 | 57 | −22 | 27 | |
| 6 | Spartans | 21 | 7 | 1 | 13 | 24 | 54 | −30 | 22 | |
| 7 | Aberdeen | 21 | 5 | 1 | 15 | 17 | 46 | −29 | 16 | |
| 8 | Forfar Farmington (R) | 21 | 2 | 0 | 19 | 12 | 59 | −47 | 6 | 2017 SWPL 2 |

Updated to match(es) played on 30 October 2016. Source: Soccerway
Rules for classification: 1) Points; 2) Goal difference; 3) Number of goals scored
(C) Champions; (Q) Qualified for the phase indicated; (R) Relegated

== Results ==
Matches 1 to 14

| Home \ Away | ABE | CEL | FOR | GLA | HIB | RAN | SPA | STI |
|---|---|---|---|---|---|---|---|---|
| Aberdeen | | 0–1 | 0–2 | 0–1 | 0–0 | 1–2 | 4–0 | 0–1 |
| Celtic | 5–0 | | 4–0 | 2–3 | 1–2 | 5–1 | 6–0 | 0–3 |
| Forfar Farmington | 0–3 | 2–3 | | 2–4 | 1–3 | 0–2 | 0–3 | 2–0 |
| Glasgow City | 1–0 | 1–0 | 8–0 | | 2–0 | 7–0 | 0–3 | 8–1 |
| Hibernian | 8–0 | 3–2 | 3–0 | 0–4 | | 3–1 | 4–0 | 5–0 |
| Rangers | 2–0 | 1–2 | 3–1 | 0–3 | 0–6 | | 1–0 | 4–1 |
| Spartans | 2–1 | 0–2 | 3–1 | 0–8 | 1–6 | 1–0 | | 3–1 |
| Stirling University | 1–3 | 2–1 | 1–0 | 0–1 | 0–3 | 1–0 | 2–2 | |

Updated to match(es) played on 9 October 2016. Source: Scottish Women's Football
Legend: Blue = home team win; Yellow = draw; Red = away team win.

Matches 15 to 21

| Home \ Away | ABE | CEL | FOR | GLA | HIB | RAN | SPA | STI |
|---|---|---|---|---|---|---|---|---|
| Aberdeen | | 0–3 | 1–0 | | 0–2 | 0–6 | | |
| Celtic | | | 5–0 | | | 3–1 | 1–0 | |
| Forfar Farmington | | | | 0–3 | 1–5 | | 0–1 | 0–1 |
| Glasgow City | 7–0 | 5–0 | | | 3–1 | 5–3 | | |
| Hibernian | | 3–0 | | | | 9–0 | 5–1 | 5–0 |
| Rangers | | | 3–0 | | | | 5–4 | 0–5 |
| Spartans | 0–3 | | | 0–1 | | | | 0–3 |
| Stirling University | 2–1 | 3–4 | | 0–3 | | | | |

Updated to match(es) played on 30 October 2016. Source: Scottish Women's Football
Legend: Blue = home team win; Yellow = draw; Red = away team win.
