= Glasgow Times =

Scottish newspaper

- "Nobody knows our city better"
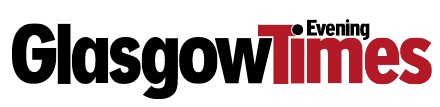
- Type: Daily newspaper (Two editions: Late News Edition and Late News Extra)
- Format: Tabloid
- Owner: USA Today Co.
- Publisher: Newsquest
- Editor: Stacey Mullen
- Founded: 1876
- Political alignment: None
- Language: English
- City: Glasgow
- Country: Scotland
- Circulation: 4,905 (as of 2024)
- Sister newspapers: Sunday Herald; The Herald; The National
- ISSN: 0307-5745
- Website: glasgowtimes.co.uk

The Glasgow Times is an evening tabloid newspaper published Monday to Saturday in the city of Glasgow, Scotland. Called The Evening Times from 1876, it was rebranded as the Glasgow Times on 4 December 2019.

== History ==
The paper, an evening sister paper of The Herald, was established in 1876. The paper's slogan is "Nobody Knows Our City Better".

Publication of the Evening Times (and its sister paper) moved to a Charles Rennie Mackintosh building in Mitchell Street in 1868. The building is now the Lighthouse, Scotland's Centre for Architecture, Design and the city.

In 1964, publishers George Outram were bought by Sir Hugh Fraser. In 1979, the ownership was acquired by Tiny Rowland's Lonrho.

On 19 July 1980, the paper moved to offices at 195 Albion Street, a black-fronted building modelled after the Black Lubyanka building of the Daily Express in London's Fleet Street. The Albion Street building had previously housed the Scottish Daily News workers' cooperative from May to November 1975.

A management buy-out in May 1992 created Caledonian Newspapers, later purchased by Scottish Television in 1996. After the purchase the TV group renamed itself "Scottish Media Group", which was later shortened to SMG and, in 2008, rebranded as STV Group plc.

== Business ==
The Glasgow Times and The Herald are owned by Newsquest (a division of Gannett), which acquired it with the purchase of the publishing arm of the Scottish Media Group in 2003 for £216 million.

== Distribution ==
The newspaper's vendor stalls became known around the city for the shouts of "Times! Evening Times!" from the vendors. The paper is additionally sold at local shops and offers home delivery in the area.

== Other publications ==
The Glasgow Times gives its name to an annual pocket-sized Scottish football publication called the Wee Red Book, which contains both the following season's fixtures in Scotland's four senior divisions and lists of previous league and cup winners from Scotland, England and Europe.
