= Highlands and Islands League =

- Founded: 2019
- Country: Scotland
- Number of clubs: 8
- Domestic cup: Scottish Women's Cup
- League cup(s): Highlands and Islands League Cup
- Current champions: Buckie
- Most championships: Buckie (3 titles)
- Website: Scottish Women's Football

The Highlands and Islands League is an amateur women's association football league in Scotland, run by Scottish Women's Football (SWF). Founded in 2019, the league sits outside the current Scottish Women's Football League pyramid. It comprises eight teams: one based in Caithness, one in Moray, one in Ross-shire, one in Nairnshire, one in Orkney, two in Sutherland, and one in Inverness-shire.

== History ==
In September 2018, a proposal to create a women's Highlands and Islands League for 2019 was ratified by Scottish Women's Football (SWF). On 25 February 2019, SWF officially announced the creation of the new league. The inaugural season ran from March to October, with each team playing 12 games, and was won by Clachnacuddin. The 2020 season was cancelled due to the COVID-19 pandemic.

== Clubs ==
=== 2023 season ===
The following eight teams are competing in the Highlands and Islands League during the 2023 season:

Team	Home ground	Location	First season	Ref.
Brora Rangers	Dudgeon Park	Brora, Sutherland	2019	
Buckie	Gordon Park	Portgordon, Moray	2019	
Caithness	Sir Georges Park	Thurso, Caithness	2019	
Clachnacuddin	Grant Street Park	Inverness, Inverness-shire	2019	
Nairn St Ninian	Nairn Showfield	Nairn, Nairnshire	2019	
Ross & Cromarty	Ferry Brae Park	North Kessock, Ross-shire	2023	
Orkney	Kirkwall Grammar School	Kirkwall, Orkney	2020	
Sutherland	Couper Park	Helmsdale, Sutherland	2020	

=== Former clubs ===
Team	Home ground	Location	First season	Last season	Ref.
Inverness Caledonian Thistle Development	Millburn Academy	Inverness, Inverness-shire	2019	2022	
Lewis and Harris	Ullapool High School	Ullapool, Ross and Cromarty	2019	2019	
Kirkwall City	The Pickaquoy Centre	Kirkwall, Orkney	2019	2021	

== Seasons ==
Season	Champions	Runners-up	Ref
2019	Clachnacuddin	Inverness Caledonian Thistle Development	
2020	Season abandoned due to COVID-19 pandemic		
2021	Inverness Caledonian Thistle Development	Clachnacuddin	
2022	Buckie	Clachnacuddin	
2023	Buckie		
2024	Ross County	Buckie	
2025	Buckie	Caithness	

== Highlands and Islands League Cup ==
The Cup competition began in the 2019 season, along with the foundation of the Highlands and Islands League. Lewis and Harris won the first edition.

Season	Winners	Runners-up	Result	Venue	Ref.
2019	Lewis and Harris	Clachnacuddin	7–0	Caledonian Stadium, Inverness	
2021	Sutherland	Clachnacuddin	3–2	Station Park, Nairn	
2022	Buckie	Sutherland	2–2 a.e.t. (3–1 pen)	Station Park, Nairn	
2023	Buckie	Caithness	3–1	Station Park, Nairn	
2024	Buckie	Sutherland	1–0	King George V Park, Golspie	
2025	Shetland	Sutherland	7–0	Station Park, Nairn	
