= Wee Red Book =

Football almanac

The Wee Red book is an annual pocket-sized Scottish football publication by the Glasgow-based Glasgow Times, which contains both the following season's fixtures in Scotland's four senior divisions and lists of previous league and cup winners from Scotland, England and Europe. The first edition was published in 1928 and today it is edited by production journalists Jackie Brogan and Stuart Sandler.
