= 2015 Scottish Women's Premier League =

Scottish Women's Premier League
- Season: 2015
- Champions: Glasgow City (10th title)
- Relegated: Heart of Midlothian; Hamilton Academical; Hutchison Vale; Inverness City
- Champions League: Glasgow City; Hibernian

The 2015 Scottish Women's Premier League (SWPL) was the fourteenth season of the Scottish Women's Premier League, the highest division of women's football in Scotland since its inception in 2002.

A total of twelve teams contested the league. Glasgow City were the reigning champions. The newly-promoted teams from the SWFL First Division were Heart of Midlothian and Stirling University, replacing relegated Queen's Park and Buchan.

The SWPL continued in the format applied since 2012. The 12 clubs faced each other once (11 games per club), after which the league split into top six and bottom six sections based on league position. Each club then played home and away against clubs in their respective sections to give a total of 21 games. For the first time, two Scottish teams qualified for the UEFA Women's Champions League, due to an expanded entry list starting from 2016–17.

Glasgow City won the championship by a 6-point margin ahead of Hibernian. This was their ninth title in a row, and their tenth overall. Glasgow City also won the 2015 Scottish Women's Premier League Cup and the 2015 Scottish Women's Cup to complete an unbeaten 'treble' (the fourth time in a row they had claimed all three domestic trophies, and the fifth time in their history). With the SWPL restructuring into two smaller divisions, four clubs – Hearts, Hamilton Academical, Hutchison Vale and Inverness City – were relegated from the top level.

== Format ==
Like in the previous season, the teams played each other once. After that the top and bottom six split. Teams in both groups then played each other twice more, for a combined total of 21 games. Points of both rounds were added.

In 2016 the Premier League would consist of two levels of eight teams. The top eight finishers qualified for the SWPL 1, the last four teams and the four best-placed teams of the SWFL First Division formed the SPWL 2 for the 2016 season.

== Teams ==
Falkirk LFC partnered with Stirling University and now compete under their name.

Team	Location	Home ground	Finishing position 2014
Aberdeen	Aberdeen	Heathryfold Park	6th
Celtic	Glasgow	K Park Training Academy, East Kilbride	5th
Forfar Farmington	Forfar	Station Park	10th
Glasgow City	Glasgow	Excelsior Stadium, Airdrie	1st
Hamilton Academical	Hamilton	New Douglas Park	7th
Heart of Midlothian	Edinburgh	Kings Park, Dalkeith	3rd, SWFL1
Hibernian	Edinburgh	Albyn Park, Broxburn	3rd
Hutchison Vale	Edinburgh	Saughton Enclosure	9th
Inverness City	Inverness	Bught Park	8th
Rangers	Glasgow	Tinto Park	2nd
Spartans	Edinburgh	Spartans Academy	4th
Stirling University	Stirling	University of Stirling	1st, SWFL1

== League standings ==
After 12 games the top two clubs, Glasgow City and Hibernian had moved 12 points clear of third placed Aberdeen. Both newly promoted teams also had a good first half, leading the relegation group after 12 matches. In the second half of the season Hearts were overtaken by Forfar Farmington and didn't make the new reduced Premier League. The two Champions League places were taken by Glasgow City and Hibernian three match days before the end.

Pos	Team	Pld	W	D	L	GF	GA	GD	Pts	Qualification or relegation
1	Glasgow City (C, Q)	21	19	2	0	99	11	+88	59	2016–17 Champions League
2	Hibernian (Q)	21	17	2	2	72	20	+52	53	2016–17 Champions League
3	Celtic	21	11	2	8	54	28	+26	35	
4	Aberdeen	21	10	4	7	32	24	+8	34	
5	Spartans	21	8	1	12	44	38	+6	25	
6	Rangers	21	8	0	13	30	57	−27	24	
7	Stirling University	21	11	3	7	45	31	+14	36	
8	Forfar Farmington	21	11	1	9	45	40	+5	34	
9	Heart of Midlothian (R)	21	6	4	11	27	52	−25	22	2016 SPWL 2
10	Hamilton Academical (R)	21	7	1	13	24	62	−38	22	2016 SPWL 2
11	Hutchison Vale (R)	21	5	3	13	31	65	−34	18	2016 SPWL 2
12	Inverness City (R)	21	0	3	18	14	89	−75	3	2016 SPWL 2

Source: Scottish Women's FA
Rules for classification: 1) Points; 2) Goal difference; 3) Number of goals scored
(C) Champions; (Q) Qualified for the phase indicated; (R) Relegated

== Results ==
=== 1st stage ===
Home \ Away	ABE	CEL	FOR	GLA	HAM	HEA	HIB	HUT	INV	RAN	SPA	STI
Aberdeen				1–2		1–0	1–3	3–3	3–1			
Celtic	1–1			1–2		7–1	0–1	7–0				
Forfar Farmington	0–2	0–4		1–8	0–1			4–0				2–2
Glasgow City					12–0	6–1	3–3		12–0	3–0	4–0	
Hamilton Academical	0–5	0–7						1–4	2–1	0–4	0–2	
Heart of Midlothian			2–0		1–1		0–2		1–1	1–0	0–4	
Hibernian			7–2		8–1				8–0	2–1	3–0	3–1
Hutchison Vale				0–5		0–1	0–4		2–1		0–10	
Inverness City		0–5	1–2							0–6	0–7	1–1
Rangers	0–2	2–1	2–1					1–0				3–1
Spartans	0–0	0–3	5–0							0–4		0–1
Stirling University	0–1	2–3		0–3	3–1	3–3		2–0				

Updated to match(es) played on 2 August 2015. Source: Scottish FA
Legend: Blue = home team win; Yellow = draw; Red = away team win.

=== Final stage ===
Championship group

Home \ Away	ABE	CEL	GLA	HIB	RAN	SPA
Aberdeen		3–0	0–1	3–0	2–0	0–4
Celtic	1–1		0–6	0–1	2–0	3–1
Glasgow City	3–1	3–0		3–3	7–0	2–0
Hibernian	2–0	2–1	0–2		4–1	4–1
Rangers	2–0	0–5	0–10	0–9		4–5
Spartans	1–2	2–3	0–2	0–3	2–0	

Updated to match(es) played on 1 November 2015. Source: Scottish FA
Legend: Blue = home team win; Yellow = draw; Red = away team win.

Relegation group

Home \ Away	FOR	HAM	HEA	HUT	INV	STI
Forfar Farmington		3–1	5–2	5–0	7–0	1–0
Hamilton Academical	1–0		4–0	1–2	4–0	1–2
Heart of Midlothian	0–2	0–1		2–1	2–0	2–3
Hutchison Vale	1–2	5–1	4–4		4–1	2–5
Inverness City	1–6	1–3	0–3	3–3		1–4
Stirling University	0–2	2–0	7–1	2–0	4–1	

Updated to match(es) played on 1 November 2015. Source: Scottish FA
Legend: Blue = home team win; Yellow = draw; Red = away team win.
