= Scottish Women's Premier League =

Women's top division association football league in Scotland

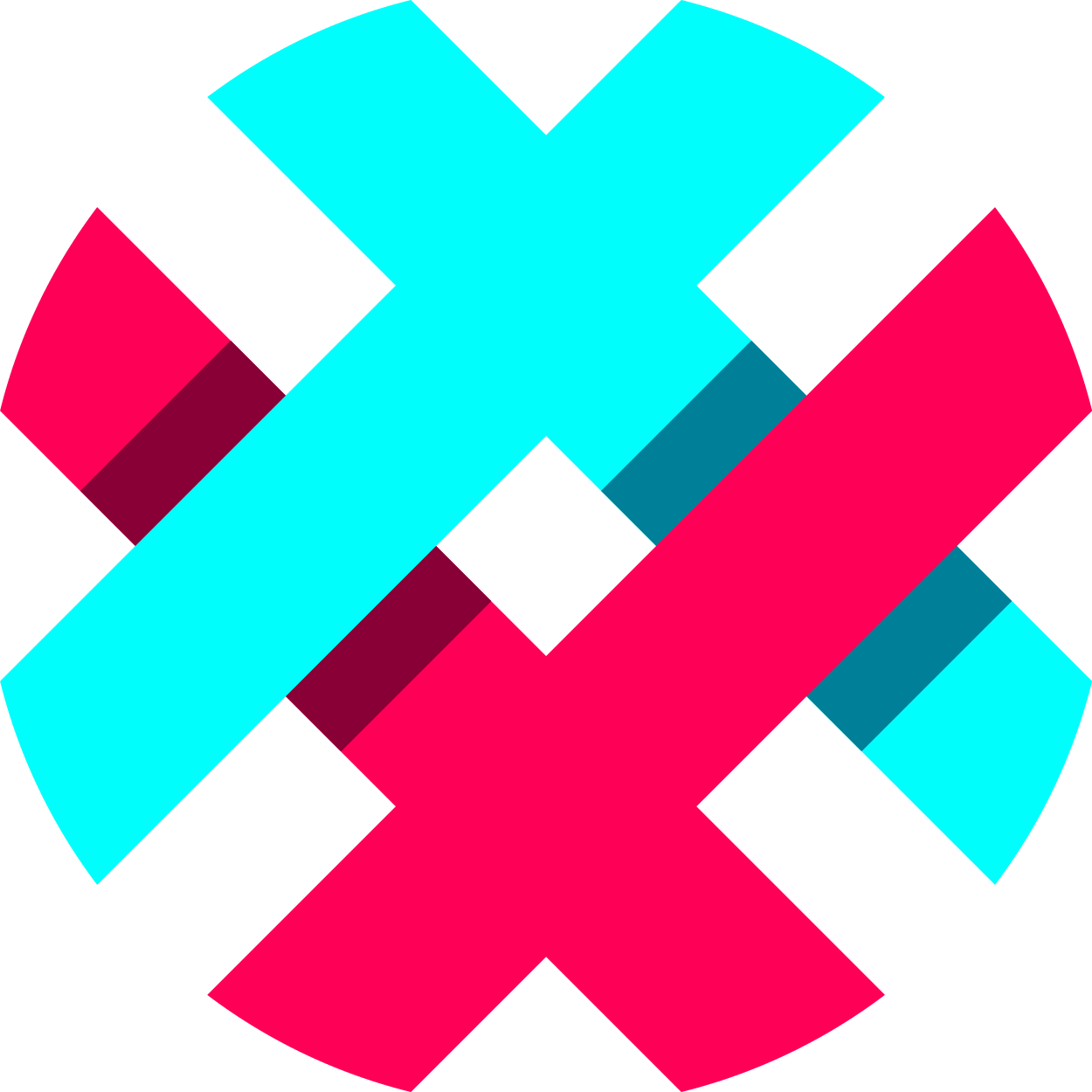
- Organising bodies: SPFL (since 2022)
- First season: 2002–03
- Country: Scotland
- Confederation: UEFA
- Divisions: 2
- Number of clubs: 20
- Level on pyramid: 1–2
- Relegation to: Scottish Women's Football Championship
- Domestic cup: Scottish Women's Cup
- League cup: Scottish Premier League Cup
- International cup: UEFA Champions League
- Current champions: Heart of Midlothian (1st title)
- Most championships: Glasgow City (16 titles)
- Broadcaster(s): BBC Alba, BBC Scotland, Sky Sports
- Website: swpl.uk
- Current: 2026–27 SWPL, 2026–27 SWPL 2

The Scottish Women's Premier League (SWPL) is the highest level of league competition in women's football in Scotland. Its two divisions are SWPL (previously styled as SWPL 1) and SWPL 2. The league was formed when the Premier Division of the Scottish Women's Football League (SWFL) broke away to form the SWPL in 2002. SWPL 2 was introduced in 2016.

The divisions contain (in the 2022–23 season) 12 clubs in SWPL and eight in SWPL 2. Glasgow City have won 16 championships, including 14 in succession from 2007–08 until 2020–21. The champions and runners-up qualify for the UEFA Women's Champions League.

From 2002, the league was owned and managed by Scottish Women's Football. Administration of the SWPL was taken over by the Scottish Football Association in 2007, then by the Scottish Professional Football League in 2022. The SWPL runs on the winter calendar but operated a summer-season format from 2009 until 2020.

== History ==
=== 2002–2009 ===
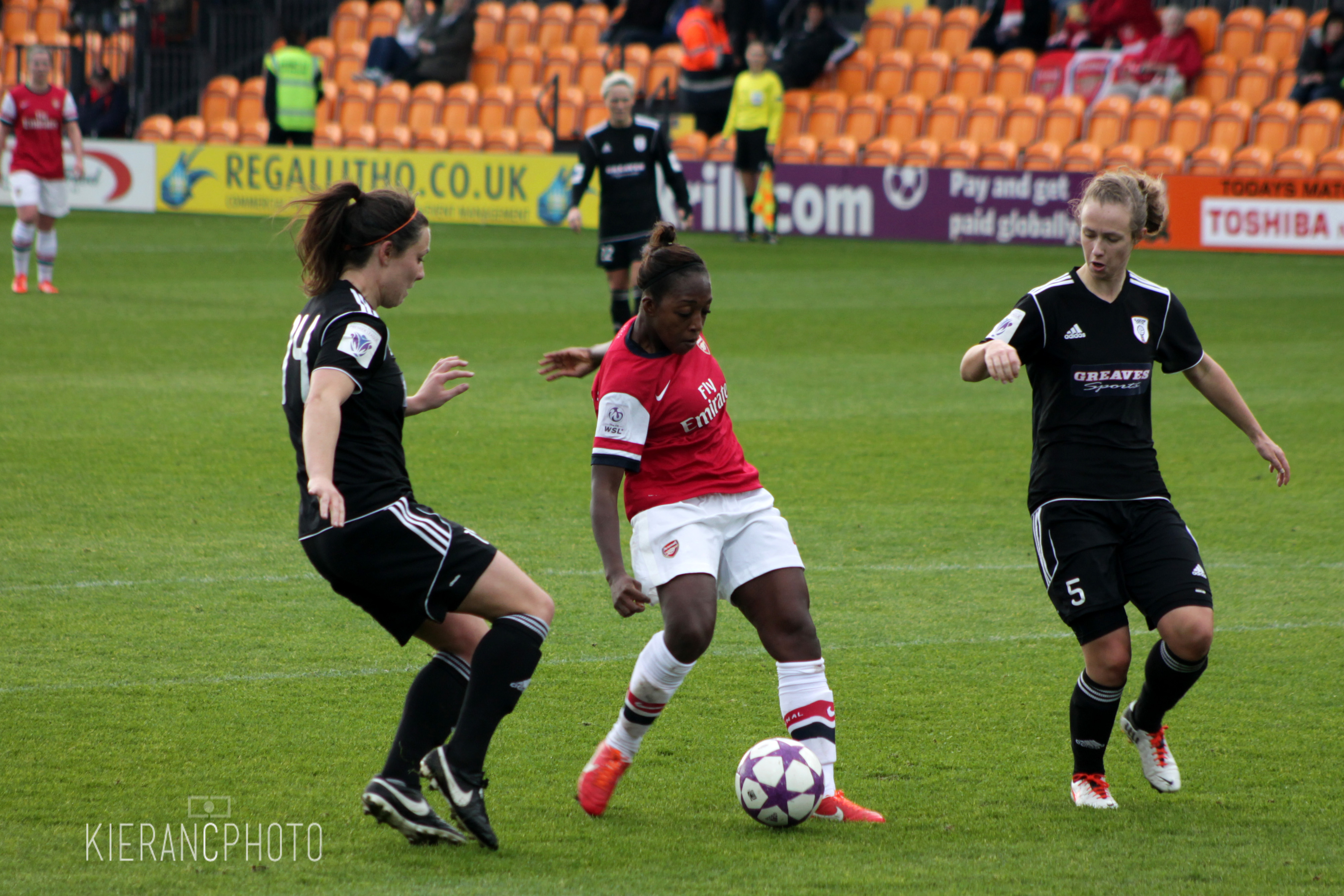
Glasgow City, the SWPL's most successful club, playing Arsenal in a 2014 Champions League match; L-R, Rachel Corsie, Dan Carter and Eilish McSorley

From the Scottish Women's Football Association national and regional leagues dating from 1972, the SWFA and clubs formed the Scottish Women's Football League (SWFL) in 1999, with four national divisions. Its top division broke away to form the Scottish Women's Premier League (SWPL) in 2002, with the aim of introducing a more professional attitude and increasing media interest. The twelve founder members of the SWPL were Ayr United, Cove Rangers, Dundee, Giulianos, Glasgow City, F.C. Hamilton, Hibernian, Inver-Ross, F.C. Kilmarnock, Lossiemouth, Raith Rovers and Shettleston.

In the 2002–03 season, Kilmarnock became the champions, after a title race with Hibernian. Kilmarnock Ladies had formed from the 1971 Scottish Women's Cup-winners Stewarton Thistle, and also won the 2001–02 SWFL, two Scottish Cups and four consecutive League Cups. Kilmarnock's success faded after the departure of manager Jim Chapman and of Scotland internationals including Shelley Kerr, Joanne Love and Linda Brown.

Hibernian Ladies were the most successful club in the League's first five years. The title in 2003–04 went to Hibs, 14 points ahead of Glasgow City, and Hibernian added further titles in 2005–06 and in 2006–07 (winning every game that season). The Hibs squad included Scotland's Pauline Hamill, Kirsty McBride, Suzanne Grant, Joelle Murray and Kim Little.

Glasgow City won the Scottish championship for the first time in 2004–05, coached by Peter Caulfield. The club's next title was in season 2007–08, beating Hibernian by five points, with Celtic placing third in its first season. In 2007, the running of the League was taken over by the Scottish Football Association while the SWFA, renamed SWF, thereafter operated as part of the SFA.

=== 2009–2019 ===
The women's leagues' move from a winter to a summer schedule (March–November), from 2009, saw a rise in attendances in its first seasons, and far fewer match postponements.

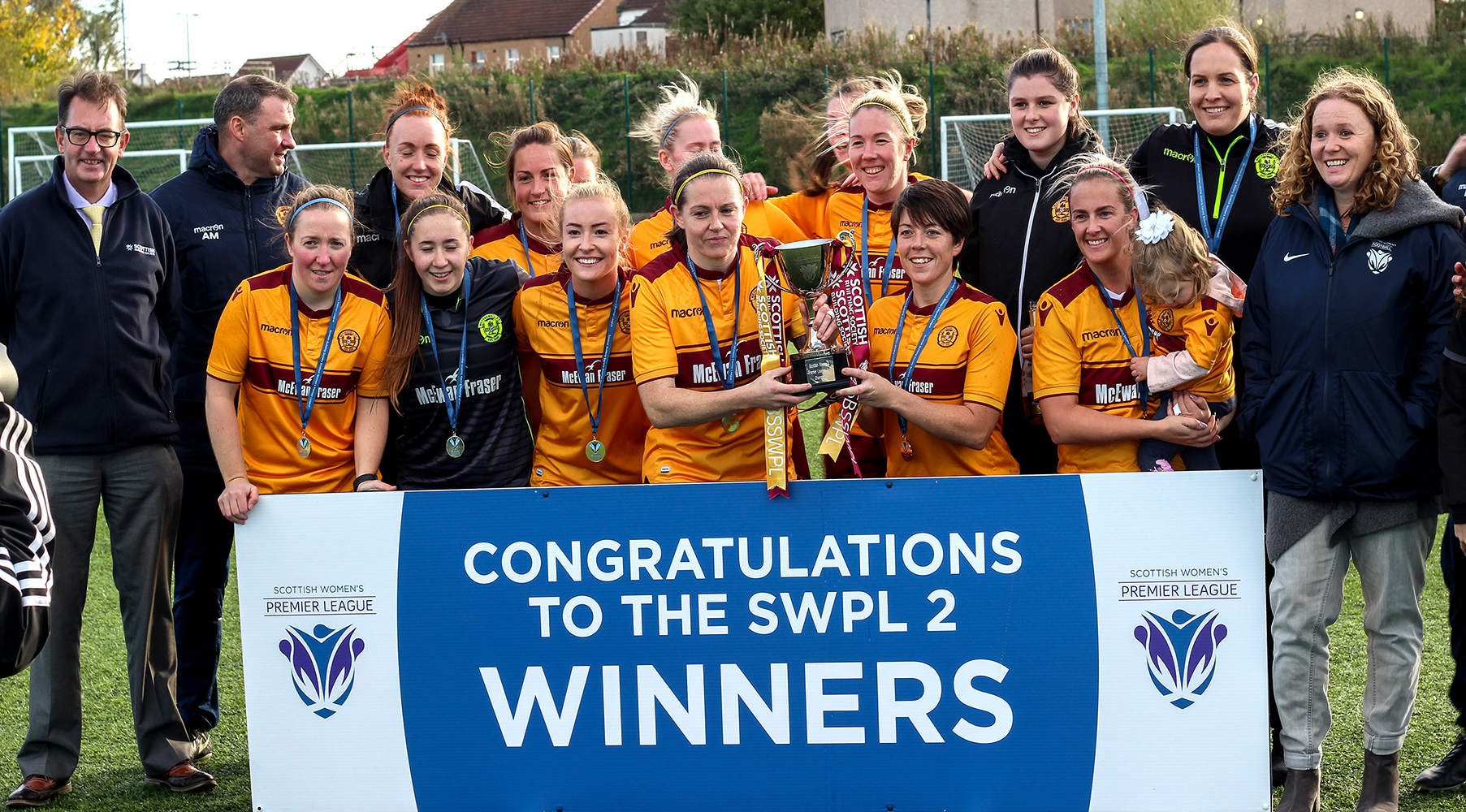
Motherwell with the SWPL 2 trophy in 2018

In the 11-year era of the summer schedule in Scottish women's football, Glasgow City won every title and became one of the most dominant clubs in any national league in world football. Between the 2007–08 and 2015 seasons, City lost only four matches in the League (including one match awarded against them retrospectively for an ineligible player); their squads included Jane Ross, Denise O'Sullivan (each a winner of the SWPL Players' Player of the Year), and Leanne Ross, who ultimately scored 250 goals in 12 seasons at the club. Glasgow City also won the domestic Treble in 2012, 2013, 2014 and 2015.

Glasgow City considered applying to join the English league in 2013. Club co-founder Carol Anne Stewart commented, "the FA are investing seriously in women's football. This is where the SFA are miles behind. They don't recognise the potential".

The issue of competitive imbalance was the catalyst for the separation of the top Scottish clubs into two reduced divisions, SWPL 1 and SWPL 2, in 2016.

The first professional contracts in the SWPL were signed at Glasgow Girls (Glasgow Women) in 2016, by Lauren Coleman and Lauren Evans. The next full-time contracts were offered later by Rangers and Celtic.

=== 2020–present ===
There were fears for the league's survival when the 2020 season was halted and eventually voided due to the COVID-19 pandemic. Along with other Scottish football organisations, the SWPL and SWF Championship received donations from the philanthropist James Anderson and from an anonymous donor: "The focus was to buy time so the women's game could survive the COVID crisis until it was safe for football to return." The £437,500 total was the biggest investment in SWF to date.

The 2020–21 season was completed, as Glasgow City won their 14th title in a row. In 2022, a majority of the 17 SWPL clubs voted to leave SWF and join the SPFL after months of negotiations between those parties and the SFA, and an SFA review from April 2020 until mid-2021, which resolved to improve governance of elite competitions. The decision was aimed at improving the league's commercial profile and broadcasting deal. The league maintained its two divisions and expanded to 20 clubs. The top two tiers of women's football are run within the SPFL by a separate board that includes the clubs' representatives.

== Trophies ==
New trophies were introduced for the 2022–23 season: the main championship trophy topped with a golden crown, and the SWPL trophy on a smaller scale with a silver crown. Revamped branding and logos were also introduced. The trophies were made by British silverware manufacturers Thomas Lyte.

== Format ==
From 2002–03 until 2008–09, the SWPL followed Scottish football's traditional autumn-spring calendar, as the SWFL had. Scottish Women's Football changed all leagues to a summer format and the SWPL became a summer league from 2009 until 2020, running from March until November. The 2009 season was shortened to fit, as a single round-robin. The 2020 season was abandoned due to COVID-19, and Scottish women's football has reverted to winter seasons from 2020–21 onwards.

The initial Women's Premier League format was based on a double round-robin of 12 clubs. Some seasons had fewer games, in part due to the withdrawals of Shettleston (2003–04), Newburgh Juniors (2007–08), and Queen's Park (2008–09). The 2011 season also had an 11-club league. From 2012 until 2015, the SWPL division used the "split" format for the first and last half of the season: a 12-team single round-robin, then a double round-robin between the top six and bottom six clubs respectively, to decide league champions and two relegation places to the First Division (SWFL 1).

The two-division format that began in 2016 created SWPL 1 and SWPL 2, with eight clubs in each, playing each other three times a season; the mid-season "split" was discontinued. Only the SWPL 2 champion club was promoted, while its two last-placed teams were relegated to SWFL 1.

SWPL 2 was expanded to 10 clubs in 2020. SWPL 1 expanded to 10 clubs in 2021–22, but, because of the withdrawal of SWPL 1's Forfar Farmington from the SWPL, three clubs were promoted from SWPL 2, which shrank to seven clubs playing each other four times.

A 12-club "split" format returned in SWPL 1 in 2022–23, but with a double round-robin before the "split". SWPL 2 added three clubs from the Championship; SWPL 2 has eight teams playing each other four times, one automatic promotion place to SWPL 1, and a second place decided by a promotion/relegation play-off.

The SWPL champions have qualified for the UEFA Women's Cup/Women's Champions League since 2003; the first Scottish club to qualify had been the SWFL's Ayr United in 2001. Glasgow City were the first Scottish club to reach the last 16 (2008–09) and the quarter-finals (2014–15, 2019–20). Depending on the Scottish national coefficient, the league runners-up have also qualified in some seasons since 2015, including in 2021–22 and 2022–23.

== 2023–24 teams ==
Locations of teams in the SWPL

=== SWPL ===
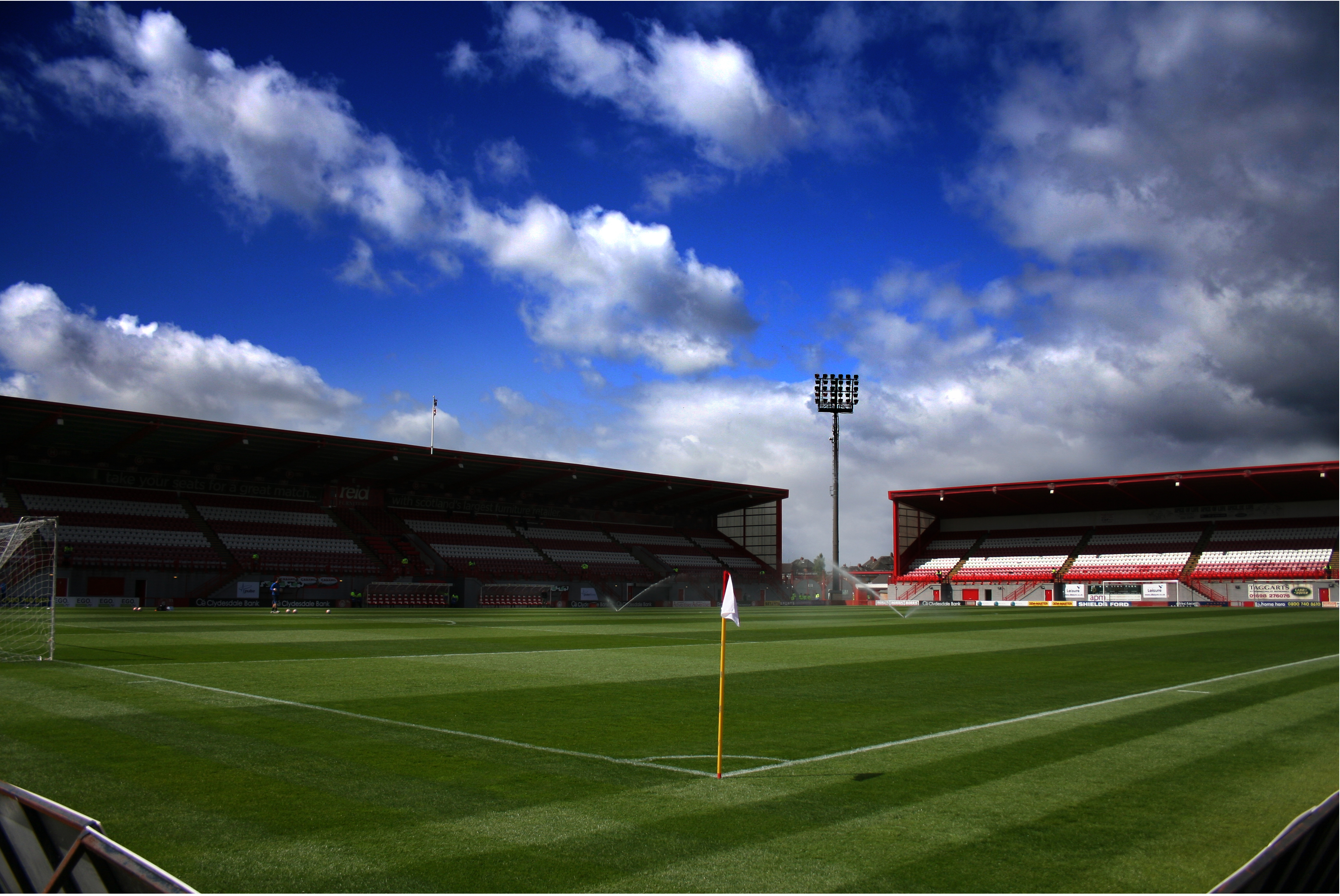
Hamilton Academical's home ground, New Douglas Park

Club	Location	Home ground	Capacity	2022–23 position
Aberdeen	Cove Bay	Balmoral Stadium	2,602	9th
Celtic	Airdrie	Excelsior Stadium	10,101	2nd
Dundee United	Dundee	Gussie Park	TBC	10th
Glasgow City	Springburn	Petershill Park	1,000	1st
Hamilton Academical	Hamilton	New Douglas Park	6,018	11th
Heart of Midlothian	Riccarton	Oriam	1,000	4th
Hibernian	Edinburgh	Meadowbank Stadium	1,320	5th
Montrose	Montrose	Links Park	4,936	1st (SWPL2)
Motherwell	East Kilbride	K-Park	500	8th
Partick Thistle	Springburn	Petershill Park	1,000	6th
Rangers	Cumbernauld	Broadwood Stadium	8,086	3rd
Spartans	Edinburgh	Ainslie Park	3,000	7th

=== SWPL 2 ===
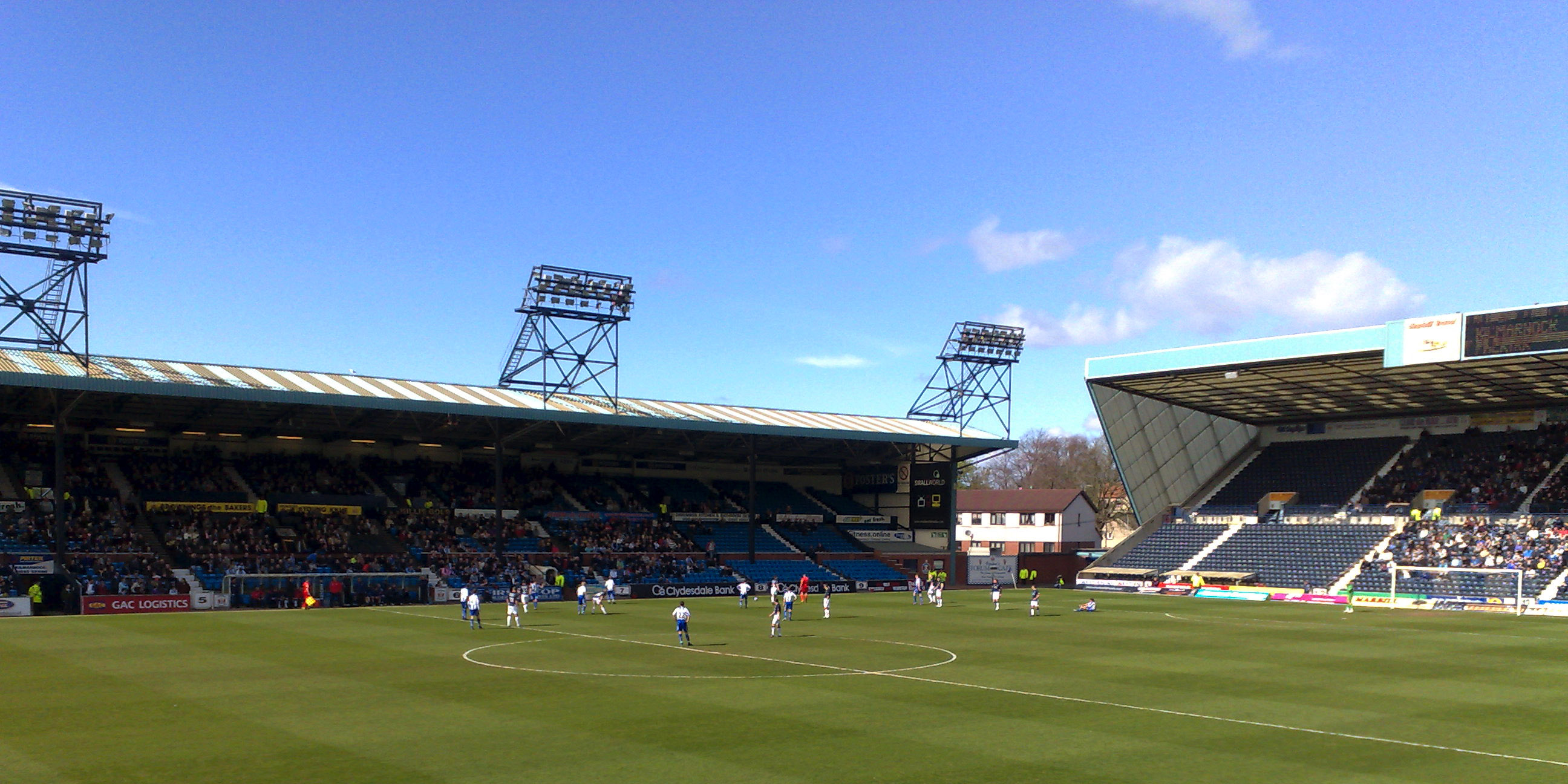
Rugby Park, Kilmarnock

Club	Location	Home ground	Capacity	2024–25 position
Boroughmuir Thistle	Edinburgh	Meadowbank Stadium	1,320	3rd
Dundee United	Dundee	Foundation Park	225	12th - relegated from SWPL
East Fife	Leven	King George V Park, Leven	1,000	1st - promoted from SWC
Gartcairn	Airdrie	MTC Park	300	4th
Kilmarnock	Kilmarnock	Rugby Park	15,003	2nd
Livingston	Livingston	Almondvale	9,713	5th
Queen's Park	Govan	New Tinto Park	1,000	11th - relegated from SWPL
St Johnstone	Perth	Riverside Stadium	500	6th
Spartans	Edinburgh	Vanloq Community Stadium	3,000	10th - relegated from SWPL
Stirling University	Stirling	Gannochy Sports Centre	1,000	2nd - promoted from SWC

== Champions ==
List of Scottish Women's Premier League seasons:

Season	Champions	Runners-up	Ref
2002–03	Kilmarnock	Hibernian	
2003–04	Hibernian	Glasgow City	
2004–05	Glasgow City	Hibernian	
2005–06	Hibernian	Glasgow City	
2006–07	Hibernian	Glasgow City	
2007–08	Glasgow City	Hibernian	
2008–09	Glasgow City	Spartans	
2009	Glasgow City	Celtic	
2010	Glasgow City	Celtic	
2011	Glasgow City	Spartans	
2012	Glasgow City	Forfar Farmington	
2013	Glasgow City	Hibernian	
2014	Glasgow City	Rangers	
2015	Glasgow City	Hibernian	
2016	Glasgow City	Hibernian	
2017	Glasgow City	Hibernian	
2018	Glasgow City	Hibernian	
2019	Glasgow City	Hibernian	
2020	Null and void		
2020–21	Glasgow City	Celtic	
2021–22	Rangers	Glasgow City	
2022–23	Glasgow City	Celtic	
2023–24	Celtic	Rangers	
2024–25	Hibernian	Glasgow City	
2025–26	Heart of Midlothian	Rangers	

Club	Championships	Runners-up
Glasgow City	16	5
Hibernian	4	9
Celtic	1	4
Rangers	1	3
Heart of Midlothian	1	0
Kilmarnock	1	0
Spartans	0	2
Forfar Farmington	0	1

=== SWPL 2 ===
Season	Champions	Runners-up	Ref
2016	Hamilton Academical	Heart of Midlothian	
2017	Forfar Farmington	Glasgow Girls	
2018	Motherwell	Kilmarnock	
2019	Heart of Midlothian	Hamilton Academical	
2020	Null and void		
2020–21	Aberdeen	Hamilton Academical	
2021–22	Dundee United	Glasgow Women	
2022–23	Montrose	Gartcairn	
2023–24	Queen's Park	Kilmarnock	
2024–25	Hamilton Academical	Kilmarnock	
2025–26	Spartans	Kilmarnock	

Club	Championships	Runners-up
Hamilton Academical	2	2
Heart of Midlothian	1	1
Forfar Farmington	1	0
Motherwell	1	0
Aberdeen	1	0
Dundee United	1	0
Montrose	1	0
Queen's Park	1	0
Spartans	1	0
Kilmarnock	0	4
Glasgow Girls & Women	0	2
Gartcairn	0	1

Past SWPL clubs include Ayr United, Dundee, Cove Rangers, Giulianos, Inver-Ross, Lossiemouth, Raith Rovers, Shettleston, East Kilbride, Hutchison Vale, Newburgh Juniors, and Forfar Farmington. Clubs taken over by existing members include Arsenal North (Celtic) and Whitehill Welfare/Edinburgh Ladies (Spartans).

== Broadcasting ==
In September 2018, it was announced that BBC Alba would broadcast four SWPL 1 matches during the remainder of the 2018 season. Scottish Women's Football (SWF) and BBC Alba also announced that this will be a two-year deal for six games per year, including the Scottish Women's Cup final and Scottish Women's Premier League Cup final. In 2023 Sky Sports and BBC Scotland have been airing SWPL games and SWPL1's matches began to appear on Sky Sports News' vidiprinter service.

== Sponsorship ==
The league's sponsors in 2002–03 were Thompsons Solicitors. From 2018, the league was sponsored by the Scottish Building Society. In November 2021 Park's Motor Group became the sponsor, initially running until the end of the 2021–22 season.

== In popular culture ==
The Scottish Women's Premier League table was first included in the Evening Times Wee Red Book in 2008–09.
