= Women's football in Scotland =

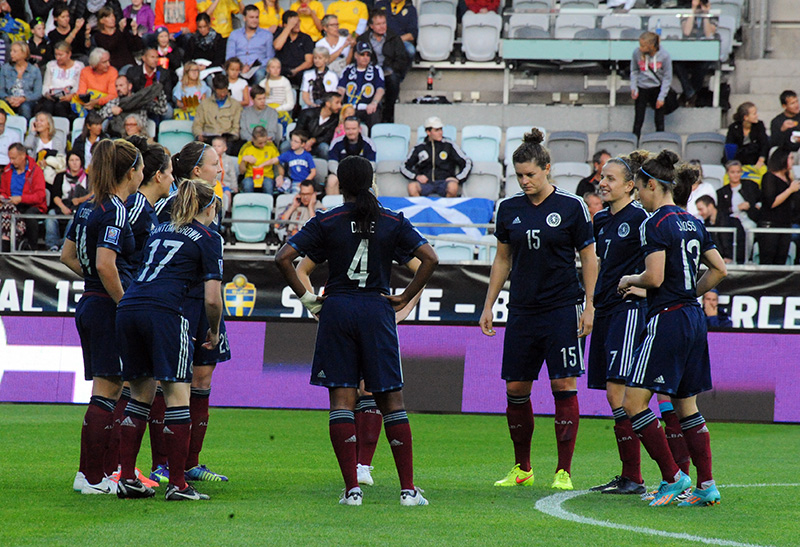
- Scotland national team in Sweden, 2014
- Country: Scotland
- Governing body: Scottish Women's Football
- National team: Women's national team

National competitions
- Scottish Women's Premier League; Scottish Women's Cup

International competitions
- Champions League (clubs); European Championship (national team); FIFA Women's World Cup (national team)

Women's association football in Scotland has an organised history including the first international women's match in 1881, the president of the British Ladies' Football Club in 1895, Lady Florence Dixie, the Edinburgh–Preston "World Championship" in 1937 and 1939, and the Scottish Women's Cup founded in 1970. The sport is jointly overseen by Scottish Women's Football (originally SWFA), the Scottish Football Association, and Scottish Professional Football League.

Faced with bans and restrictions from the 1920s to the 1970s by organisers of male football competitions, Scottish women's football has had some international success and recently gained some professional clubs. As of 2022, the women's leagues consist of the Scottish Women's Premier League with two divisions, the SWF Championship and League One, the Scottish Women's Football League (formed in 1999) and the Highlands and Islands League.

The Scottish Women's Cup was first played in 1970–71, won by Stewarton Thistle. The Cup is open to all senior teams affiliated to SWF. Clubs of specific leagues enter the SWPL Cup, SWF Championship Cup, SWFL League Cup and Plate, the Highlands and Islands League Cup, the 'Performance' youth league cups, and various youth cups at lower levels.

The Scotland women's national team played its first official game in 1972, competed in the 1979 European championship and played its first game at Hampden Park in 2012. The team qualified for its first Women's World Cup in the 2019 tournament. Scotland's most famous female players include Rose Reilly, Julie Fleeting, Kim Little, and the most-capped player of the national team, Gemma Fay.

== History ==
Church documents recorded women playing football in Carstairs, Lanarkshire, in 1628. A Scotland team played in the world's first recorded women's association football match, an international, in May 1881 at Hibernian Park in Edinburgh, where the Scotland XI won 3–0 against England. The Scottish Football Association has records of a women's match that took place in 1892 (according to a 2005 article). However, the sport was traditionally seen as a working class and male preserve.

Women's football struggled for recognition during this early period. After a period of growth during and after the First World War, including an Anglo-Scottish women's club game at Celtic Park in 1918, men's clubs who were interested in using their grounds for women's football were subsequently denied permission by the Scottish Football Association (SFA) in 1924–25.

Research has shown that clubs such as Rutherglen Ladies played exhibition matches for charity in front of large crowds during the 1920s and '30s. Rutherglen won 2–0 against the famous English women's football team, Dick, Kerr Ladies, in their match at Shawfield Park in September 1923.

Edinburgh Ladies faced Preston Ladies (the successor to Dick, Kerr Ladies), for a British trophy named the Ladies' Football World Championship, on at least two occasions in the 1930s. Preston won in 1937 by a 5–1 score, but the trophy went to Scotland in 1939, when Edinburgh won the title, beating Preston 5–2 in an apparently longer club competition.

The sport continued on an unofficial basis until 1971, when UEFA instructed its members to take control of women's football within their territories. The motion was passed 31–1, but Scotland was the only member to vote against it.

In 1971 the Scottish Women's Football Association (SWFA) was founded and six teams registered for competition: Aberdeen, Edinburgh Dynamos, Westthorn United, Motherwell AEI, Dundee Strikers and Stewarton Thistle. In 1972–73, Westthorn United won the first league title. With Scotland having played their first official international match and Scottish teams reaching the final of the English WFA Cup in 1971, 1972 and 1973, the SFA lifted the ban and recognised the SWFA in August 1974.

The Scottish Women's Football League (SWFL) was formed by the SWFA and clubs in November 1999, from the existing national league. In 2002–03, the SWFL Premier Division broke away to form the Premier League (SWPL). The SWFA was renamed Scottish Women's Football Ltd (SWF) in 2001, and in 2007 was taken over by the SFA.

== Champions ==
The following clubs are known to have won the Scottish Women's FA National League (1972–1999), Scottish Women's Football League championship (1999–2002) and Scottish Women's Premier League (2002–present):

| Year | Team | Notes |
|---|---|---|
| 1937 | Edinburgh City Girls | |

=== Scottish Women's Football League (1972–1999) ===
| Year | Team | Notes |
|---|---|---|
| 1972–73 | Westthorn United | |
| 1973–74 | Motherwell AEI | Noted in the Dumbarton County Reporters in February 1976 as being unbeaten in over two seasons. |
| 1974–75 | Motherwell AEI | |
| 1975–76 | Edinburgh Dynamos | The East Division winners, defeated West Division winners Motherwell AEI in a decider. |
| 1976–77 | | Unknown |
| 1977–78 | | Unknown |
| 1978–79 | | Unknown |
| 1979–80 | Motherwell AEI | |
| 1980–81 | | Unknown |
| 1981–82 | Motherwell | |
| 1982–83 | Dundee Strikers | |
| 1983–84 | Allanton Miners' Welfare | |
| 1984–85 | Whitehill | |
| 1985–86 | | Unknown |
| 1986–87 | Dundee Strikers | |
| 1987–88 | Stewarton Thistle | Defeated Livingston Thistle in a decider held over until November 1988. |
| 1988–89 | | Unknown |
| 1989–90 | | Unknown |
| 1990–91 | Inveralmond Thistle | |
| 1991–92 | Inveralmond Thistle | |
| 1992–93 | Hutchison Vale | |
| 1993–94 | Hutchison Vale | |
| 1994–95 | Hutchison Vale | |
| 1995–96 | Cumbernauld United | |
| 1996–97 | Cumbernauld United | |
| 1997–98 | Cumbernauld United | |
| 1998–99 | Cumbernauld United | Reported in the press in October 1999 as Scotland's top team when they were briefly renamed Stenhousemuir between October 1999 and February 2001. |

=== SWFL Premier Division (1999–2002) ===
| Year | Team | Notes |
|---|---|---|
| 1999–00 | Stenhousemuir | |
| 2000–01 | Ayr United | |
| 2001–02 | F.C. Kilmarnock Ladies | |

=== Scottish Women's Premier League (2002–present) ===
| Year | Team | Notes |
|---|---|---|
| 2002–03 | F.C. Kilmarnock | |
| 2003–04 | Hibernian Ladies | |
| 2004–05 | Glasgow City | |
| 2005–06 | Hibernian Ladies | |
| 2006–07 | Hibernian Ladies | |
| 2007–08 | Glasgow City | |
| 2008–09 | Glasgow City | |
| 2009 | Glasgow City | |
| 2010 | Glasgow City | |
| 2011 | Glasgow City | |
| 2012 | Glasgow City | |
| 2013 | Glasgow City | |
| 2014 | Glasgow City | |
| 2015 | Glasgow City | |
| 2016 | Glasgow City | |
| 2017 | Glasgow City | |
| 2018 | Glasgow City | |
| 2019 | Glasgow City | |
| 2020 | | Declared null and void due to coronavirus pandemic. |
| 2020–21 | Glasgow City | |
| 2021–22 | Rangers | |
| 2022–23 | Glasgow City | |
| 2023–24 | Celtic | |

== League system ==
In 2016, the Premier League was reduced from 12 to 8 eight teams but expanded to a second level. In 2017, the SWFL 2 changed from 4 to 3 regions. In 2020, clubs in SWFL 1 became members of a new Championship and SWFL 2 became a separate system.

The current (since 2022) pyramid is over 4 tiers, plus leagues outside of the pyramid:

| Level | League(s) / Division(s) | | | | |
|---|---|---|---|---|---|
| | National Leagues | | | | |
| 1 | Scottish Women's Premier League 1; 12 clubs playing 32 games ↓ 1 relegation spot + 1 relegation playoff spot | | | | |
| 2 | Scottish Women's Premier League 2; 8 clubs playing 28 games ↑ 1 promotion spot + 1 promotion playoff spot ↓ 1 relegation spot + 1 relegation playoff spot | | | | |
| 3 | Scottish Women's Championship 8 clubs playing TBC games ↑ 1 promotion spot + 1 promotion playoff spot ↓ TBC relegation spots | | | | |
| 4 | Scottish Women's League One 12 clubs playing TBC games ↑ TBC promotion spots ↓ TBC relegation spots | | | | |
| | Regional Leagues | | | | |
| 5 | Scottish Women's Football League | | | | |
| 5 | SWFL North 10 clubs playing 18 games ↑ 1 promotion playoff spot | SWFL East 10 clubs playing 18 games ↑ 1 promotion playoff spot | SWFL South 9 clubs playing 16 games ↑ 1 promotion playoff spot | SWFL West 10 clubs playing 18 games ↑ 1 promotion playoff spot | SWFL Central 10 clubs playing 18 games ↑ 1 promotion playoff spot |
| – | Highlands and Islands League 8 clubs playing 14 games | | | | |

The team that wins the Premier League title qualifies for the following season's UEFA Champions League, with the runners-up generally also qualifying depending on the nation's coefficient.

The pre-2020 third-tier regional divisions under the Scottish Women's Football League became a separate 'Recreational' setup no longer linked by merit to the 'Performance' levels above (although individual clubs can still apply to join the Championship). Until 2019, reserve and youth squads could compete in the senior pyramid as long as they were not in the same division as the titular club – this was then changed with the introduction of a 'National Performance League' structure for under-16 and under-19 leagues featuring age group teams of the top clubs.

== Scottish Women's Cup ==
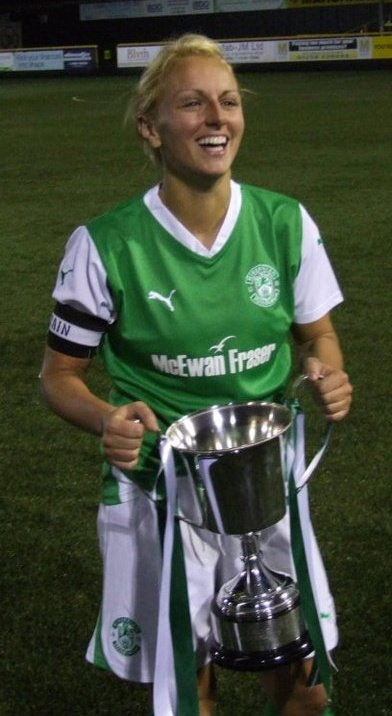
Rhonda Jones of Hibernian and Scotland with the Scottish Women's Cup trophy in 2010

The Scottish Women's Cup is the primary national knockout cup competition, is owned and managed by SWF, and is open to all senior teams affiliated with the SWF. The competition was first held in 1970–71.

The winner of the first competition was Stewarton Thistle. They played against the Aberdeen Prima Donnas and won 4–2. Stewarton later became F.C. Kilmarnock, the Cup-winners in 2001 and 2002.

The Cup has been won the most times by Glasgow City (nine times) and Hibernian (eight times). In the 2022 final, Celtic defeated Glasgow City to win the trophy for the first time; Rangers won their first in 2024.

== Senior national team ==
Scotland's first official match, a 3–2 defeat to England, took place in November 1972. The team was managed by Rab Stewart. The Scottish Women's Football Association was not recognised by the SFA until 1974. The SFA assumed direct responsibility for Scottish women's football in 1998.

The Scottish government in 2013 promised to increase funding for the Women's national team. Scotland women's national football team qualified for their first major tournament Euro 2017. The 2019 FIFA Women's World Cup was the first FIFA Women's World Cup tournament qualified for Scotland.

== See also ==
- Football in Scotland
- Scottish football league system
- Scottish Women's Premier League
- Scottish Women's Football (Association)
