= Glasgow Women F.C. =

Coordinates: 55.85209°N 4.326006°W

Glasgow Girls & Women FC
- Full name: Glasgow Girls & Women Football Club
- Founded: 2008; 18 years ago
- Ground: Budhill Park, Glasgow
- Chairperson
- Manager: Andy Gardner
- League: Scottish Women's Football Championship
- Website: http://www.glasgowgirlsfc.com/home/
Home colours	Away colours

Glasgow Girls & Women Football Club, whose first team is branded as Glasgow GWFC, is a Scottish women's association football club based in the East End of Glasgow. They are members of the Scottish Women's Football Championship. They were previously known as Glasgow Girls at senior level before rebranding in 2020.

== History ==
The club and was formed in 2008, following on from an earlier club called Clyde Girls. They initially operated at under-13 level, subsequently adding other age level teams and an adult team. Several of the original group of girls progressed to the senior team. An associated boys' club, Glasgow Boys, was founded in 2013,

The club has been awarded the SFA Legacy Quality Mark, the national body's highest accreditation for organising football to a recognised standard.

In the 2021-22 season the club won promotion to the top tier of Scottish women's football by placing second in the SWPL2. However, in the next season they became one of only nine football clubs known to have completed a full season with no victories and no draws as they lost all 22 of their games. They were duly relegated back to SWPL2.

They fared better in the 2023-24 season with 6 wins and 8 draws from their 28 games but were ultimately relegated again when they finished second bottom and lost the SWPL2 Play-off Final against Ayr United and took their place in the Scottish Women's Football Championship.

As of the 2025/26 season the club is no longer participating in senior women's football but maintains a number of youth teams.

== Ground ==
Until 2017 the club played its home games at Budhill Park in the Springboig area of Glasgow, which opened in 2013. From 2018, the senior team played some of their home games at Petershill Park in the north of the city (also the home ground of multiple Scottish champions Glasgow City) and some at the Greenfield Football Centre near Carntyne. In 2022–23, home fixtures were played at New Tinto Park in Govan, home of Benburb.

== Players ==
=== Current squad ===
As of 21 February 2024

Note: Flags indicate national team as defined under FIFA eligibility rules; some limited exceptions apply. Players may hold more than one non-FIFA nationality.

No.	Pos.	Nation	Player
2	MF	SCO	Jenna Woods
3	DF	SCO	Rebecca McGarvey
4	DF	SCO	Leah Donnelly
5	MF	SCO	Emma Rogers
6	DF	SCO	Devon McPherson
7	FW	SCO	Caitlin McKee
9	MF	SCO	Morgan Anderson
10	FW	SCO	Maura Paterson
11	MF	SCO	Kirstin Harper
14	DF	SCO	Charmaigne McGuire
16	MF	SCO	Monica Smith

No.	Pos.	Nation	Player
18	FW	SCO	Mhairi Lyle
19	MF	SCO	Kayleigh Barghati
20	DF	SCO	Natasha Donaghy
21	FW	SCO	Elisha Duff
22	DF	SCO	Philippa MacConnell
23	MF	SCO	Courtney Reid
24	GK	SCO	Katie Andrews
25	GK	SCO	Khym Ramsay
26	FW	SCO	Brooke Shields
28	DF	SCO	Zoe Main
