= 2002–03 Scottish Women's Premier League =

Scottish Women's Premier League
- Season: 2002–03
- Dates: 11 August 2002–May 2003
- Champions: F.C. Kilmarnock (2nd title overall; 1st SWPL title)
- Champions League: F.C. Kilmarnock
- Matches: 132

The 2002–03 Women's Premier League was the opening season of the Scottish Women's Premier League (SWPL) after the Premier Division of the Scottish Women's Football League broke away in 2002. It was the 33rd season of national competitions since the Scottish Women's Cup began in 1970–71.

F.C. Kilmarnock Ladies were the defending national champions (2001–02). After a title race with Hibernian, Kilmarnock won the 2003 title.

== Teams ==
The 12 member clubs of the SWPL in 2002–03 were

Club	Location	Home ground	Capacity	2021–22 position
Ayr United	Annbank	New Pebble Park		
Cove Rangers	Aberdeen	Allan Park		
Dundee	Dundee	Dundee University Sports Ground		
Giuliano's	Gorebridge	Newbyres Park		
Glasgow City	Glasgow	Glasgow Green		2nd
F.C. Hamilton	Hamilton			SWL division one runners up
Hibernian	Edinburgh	St Marks Park		
Inver-Ross	North Kessock	North Kessock Football Park		SWL division one champions
F.C. Kilmarnock	Troon	Portland Park		1st
Lossiemouth Ladies	Burghead	Forest Park		
Raith Rovers	Kirkcaldy	Dovecoat Park		
Shettleston Juniors	Shettleston	Greenfield Park		

== Season overview ==
The early season saw a 0–5 defeat of the former SWFL Premier Division champions, Ayr United Ladies, by their arch-rivals Kilmarnock. Debbie McWhinnie scored a hat-trick for Glasgow City against Dundee (6–1) and Margaret Staniforth scored five goals for Lossiemouth versus Shettleston (8–2).

Kilmarnock, managed by Jim Chapman, were a team including the future Scotland manager Shelley Kerr playing in defence, and Scotland international midfielder Joanne Love. In the New Year, Killie beat a title challenger 3–1 away, Glasgow City, with two goals by Pauline Hamill (19 January). Two months later, Killie won 3–2 away at Hibs, and took a decisive lead in the league. Shettleston were the bottom-placed club near the end of the season – a 1–0 win over Giuliano's was only their second win, before Shettleston recorded a third soon afterwards, 4–2 against Cove Rangers.

Standings:

- 1st: F.C. Kilmarnock (champions)
- 2nd: Hibernian L.F.C. (runners-up)

(Glasgow City, Cove Rangers and Giuliano's had been in the league's top five in April.)

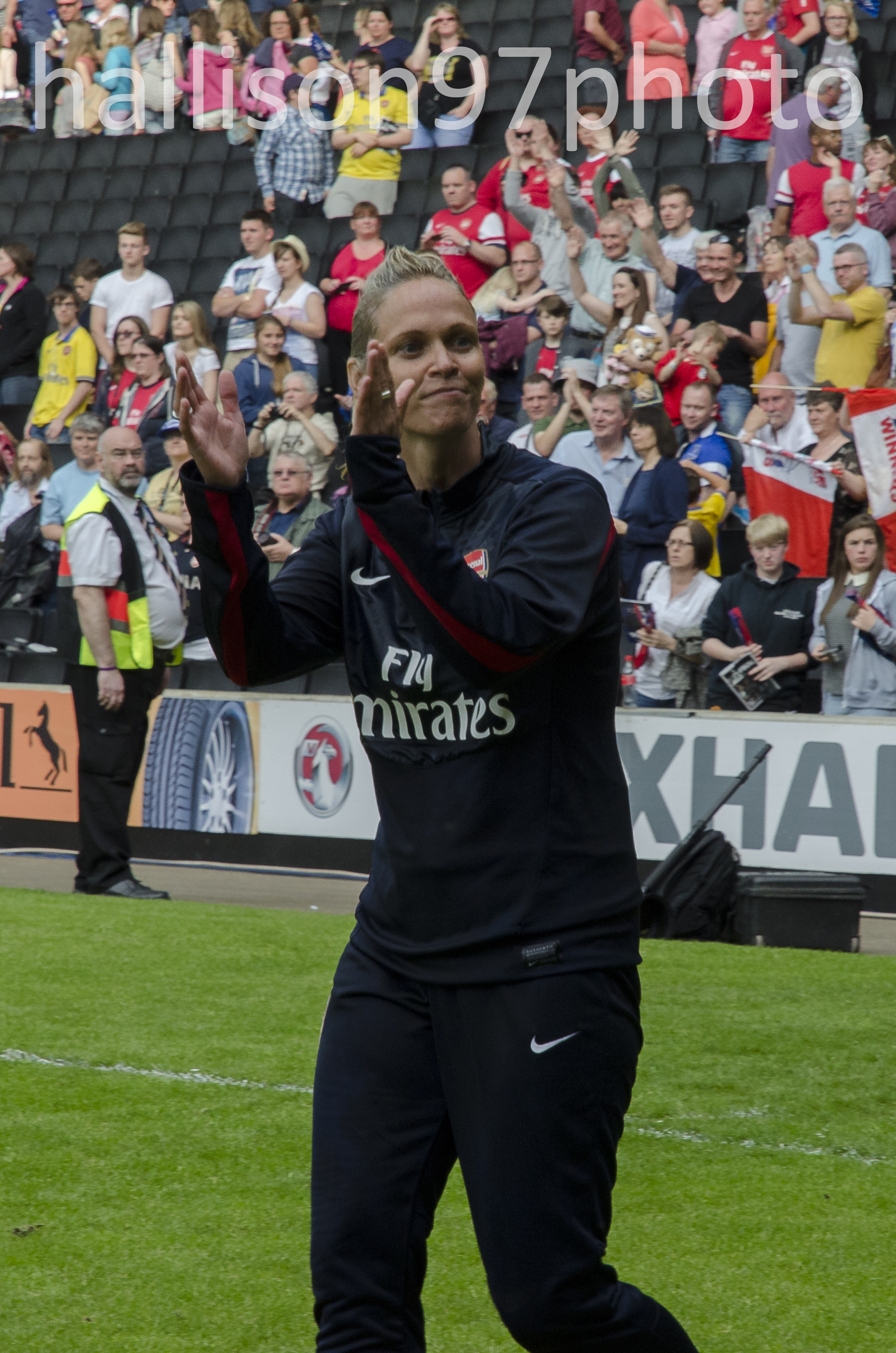
2003 SWPL champion Shelley Kerr at Arsenal, 2014

Hibernian won the 2003 Scottish Women's Cup final and, in 2004, their first league title. 2003 was Kilmarnock's last Scottish championship trophy. After Chapman's departure, the Kilmarnock team later won their third SWPL Cup in four years, but they were relegated in 2012; they won SWFL 1 South (and promotion to SWPL 2) in 2017.

Inver-Ross L.F.C. was formed in 2001 "as an amalgamation of Inverness Caledonian Thistle FC and Ross County to encourage young women and girls into football". Inver-Ross was renamed Ross County L.F.C. in season 2003–04.

The formation of the SWPL division in 2002 came only three years after the previous league reconstruction, in 1999, which had formed the Scottish Women's Football League, run by its 46 clubs and the SWFA. In 2001–02, top Scottish clubs were losing players to the United States, Iceland, and Sweden, including Julie Fleeting, Denise Brolly (both Ayr United), Darlene Campbell (Kilmarnock), Nicky Grant and Michelle Barr (both Stenhousemuir). Also, the English FA was planning a professional women's league in 2003–04, which did not materialise.

The SWFA's Maureen McGonigle said in 2002: "Hopefully it [SWPL] will create much more media interest. It is the only way we are going to get sponsorship." According to Kilmarnock manager Chapman, "The structure is now in place but we need investment, whether it's government or local business sponsorships, to help it grow." Journalist Lorraine Mawhinney asked, "Women's football is recognised as one of the world's fastest-growing sports, so why is it still a mystery to the sports pages and programmes?", adding that newspapers had agreed to carry SWPL results. However, those same results disappeared from the SWFL's own website in 2002, replaced by blank pages, when the breakaway league started.
