= Stirling University W.F.C. =

Association football club in Stirling, Scotland

Coordinates: 56°8′48.8″N 3°55′38.8″W

- Full name: Stirling University Women's Football Club
- Founded: 2015
- Ground: Gannochy Sports Centre
- Coach: Nile Robbins
- League: SWPL 2
- 2024–25: SWF Championship, 2nd of 12 (promoted via play-offs)
- Website: http://www.stir.ac.uk/footballclub/women/

Stirling University Women's Football Club is a women's football club that play in the Scottish Women's Premier League, the top division of football in Scotland.

== History ==
Founded in March 2015, the team is a football partnership between the University of Stirling and Falkirk after a pilot in 2014 which saw the University staff provide coaching and sports science support to Falkirk.

Stirling University won their first major trophy in 2025 in the ScottishPower National League Cup, winning 4–2 against Renfrew.
