= Queen's Park Women =

- Full name: Queen's Park Women
- Nickname: The Spiders
- Founded: 1999 (as Wellpark)
- Ground: Kirkintilloch Community Sport Complex
- Head Coaches: Craig Joyce & Iain Ferrie
- League: SWPL 2
- 2024-25: SWPL 1, 11th of 12th (relegated)
- Website: Official website
Home colours	Away colours

Queen's Park Women are a Scottish women's football team based in Glasgow. They were formed in 1999 as Wellpark before changing to their current name in 2002. They currently play in Scottish Women's Premier League 2, the second tier of the national league system. The team play their home matches at Kirkintilloch Community Sport Complex.

== Squad ==
As of 10 December 2023

Note: Flags indicate national team as defined under FIFA eligibility rules; some limited exceptions apply. Players may hold more than one non-FIFA nationality.

No.	Pos.	Nation	Player
—	GK	SCO	Lauren McGregor
—	GK	SCO	Chloe Gibney
—	GK	SCO	Lucy Inman (on loan from Rangers)
—	DF	SCO	Sophie Bayless
—	DF	SCO	Ciara Bonner
—	DF	SCO	Leah Daly
—	DF	SCO	Elise Macara
—	DF	SCO	Darcy Molley
—	DF	SCO	Rachel Ross
—	DF	SCO	Eleanor Smith
—	DF	SCO	Taylor Davis
—	MF	SCO	Chloe Docherty

No.	Pos.	Nation	Player
—	MF	SCO	Robin Gallagher
—	MF	SCO	Monica Harty
—	MF	SCO	Hannah Fulton
—	MF	SCO	Ellie Kane
—	MF	SCO	Rachael McConnachie
—	MF	SCO	Rachael O'Neill
—	MF	SCO	Megan Quigley
—	FW	SCO	Nicole Cairney
—	FW	SCO	Abby Callaghan
—	FW	SCO	Emma Craig
—	FW	SCO	Sophie McGoldrick
—	FW	SCO	Ami Robertson

== Technical staff ==
Position	Staff
Head coaches	Craig Joyce & Iain Ferrie
Assistant Coach	Gill Sloey
Goalkeeping Coaches	James Barbour & William McArthur
Performance Analysts	Matthew Hepburn & Alistair Smith
Physiotherapist	Amy Kernweiss
Club Chaplain	Virginie Nakure

Last updated: 21 February 2023
Source: Queen's Park FC

== Honours ==
- Scottish Women’s Premier League 2 (second tier): 2023–24
- Scottish Women's Football League (second tier): 2006–07, 2013
- SWFL Cup: 2012
- Scottish Women's Cup: Runners-up 2003-04
- SWPL Cup: Runners-up 2007–08

== See also ==
- Category:Queen's Park Women players
