= Hamilton Academical W.F.C. =

Hamilton Academical Women
- Full name: Hamilton Academical Women's Football Club
- Nickname: The Accies
- Founded: 1995 (as Hamilton Athletic)
- Ground: New Douglas Park, Hamilton, South Lanarkshire
- Capacity: 6,018
- Manager: Robert Watson
- League: SWPL 2
- 2025–26: ▼10th in SWPL 1 (relegated)
- Website: http://www.accieswfc.com/
Home colours	Away colours

Hamilton Academical Women's Football Club is a women's football club that competes in the Scottish Women's Premier League 2, after being relegated in the Scottish Women's Premier League 1 during the 2025/2026 season. The club plays its home games at New Douglas Park.

== History ==
Founded in 1995 as Hamilton Athletic LFC and elected to the Scottish Women's Football League the same year, the club won promotion in each of its first three seasons to join the Scottish Women's Premier League in 2002. After a season as FC Hamilton in 2002–03, the club came under the auspices of professional men's club Hamilton Academical F.C. and adopted their current name. Hamilton finished second in SWPL2 in the 2020–2021 season and were promoted alongside champions Aberdeen to SWPL1.

Since their promotion to the top flight in the 2020-2021 season, Hamilton have regularly been relegated to SWPL 2, before climbing back to SWPL 1 the next season.

Hamilton were again relegated in the 2025-2026 season, and are currently playing in the Scottish Women's Premier League 2 for the 2026-2027 season.

== Stadium ==
The club, who previously played at the Castle Park ground of Blantyre Victoria, currently plays its home games at New Douglas Park.

== Players ==
=== Current squad ===
As of 2 November 2025

Note: Flags indicate national team as defined under FIFA eligibility rules; some limited exceptions apply. Players may hold more than one non-FIFA nationality.

No.	Pos.	Nation	Player
1	GK	SCO	Abi Paton
2	DF	SCO	Freya MacDonald
4	DF	SCO	Hannah Coakley (Captain)
5	DF	SCO	Charmaine McGuire
6	MF	SCO	Kirstie McIntosh
7	FW	SCO	Chloe Muir
8	MF	SCO	Kirsten Love
9	FW	GER	Josi Giard
10	MF	SCO	Lucy Barclay
11	FW	SCO	Sophie Townsley
12	DF	SCO	Melissa Reid
13	FW	SCO	Deborah North-McLeod
14	DF	SCO	Keira Ritchie

No.	Pos.	Nation	Player
15	FW	SCO	Eryn Brown
16	MF	SCO	Shelley Campbell
18	DF	SCO	Shona Cowan
19	FW	SCO	Madison Maxwell
21	MF	SCO	Chloe Docherty
22	DF	SCO	Georgia Gray
23	MF	SCO	Sarah Gibb
24	DF	SCO	Olivia McStay
25	GK	SCO	Erin Halliday
26	GK	SCO	Chloe Nicolson
27	MF	SCO	Nicole Harkins
--	FW	SCO	Sophie Wilson (on-loan at (Stenhousemuir WFC))

== Staff ==
=== Coaching and medical staff ===
- Manager: Robert Watson
- Coach: Deborah McLeod
- Goalkeeping coach: Roddie MacKenzie
- Analyst & Scout: Brandin Sharpe
- S&C coach: Luke Murray
- Physiotherapist: Amanda Weir
- Head of youth academy: Lynsey Hogg

Correct as of 30 September 2024

== Honours ==
- Scottish Women's Premier League 2:
  - Winners (2): 2016, 2024-25
  - Runners Up (1): 2021

== See also ==
- Category:Hamilton Academical W.F.C. players
