= List of Scotland women's international footballers =

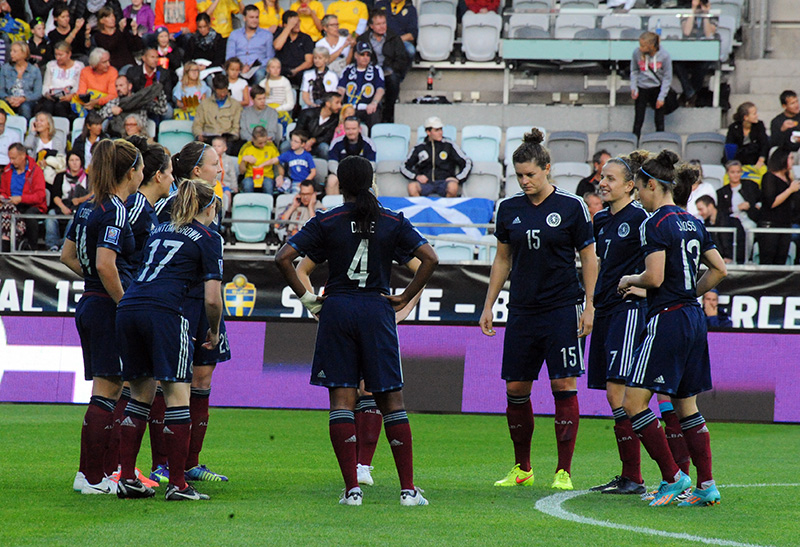
Scotland playing a 2015 World Cup qualification match in Sweden

The Scotland women's national football team represents Scotland in international women's football competitions. Since 1998, the team has been governed by the Scottish Football Association (SFA). Scotland qualified in the FIFA Women's World Cup for the first time in 2019, and qualified for their first UEFA Women's Euro in 2017.

This list includes all players who have made at least one appearance for the national team. The SFA maintains a Women's International Roll of Honour, which recognises players who have won 50 or more caps for the national team.

== List of players ==
Key

*	Still active for the national team
Caps	Appearances
WC	Appearances at FIFA Women's World Cups
EC	Appearances at UEFA Women's Championships

Pos	Positions
GK	Goalkeeper
DF	Defender
MF	Midfielder
FW	Forward

As of after the match vs. Czech Republic on 13 October 2026

Player	Ref	Pos	Caps	Goals	First cap	Last cap	WC	EC	Notes
Gemma Fay		GK	203	0	1998	2017	—	2017	—
Joanne Love		MF	191	13	2002	2019	2019	2017	—
Rachel Corsie		DF	155	20	2009	2025	2019	2017	—
Jane Ross		FW	151	62	2009	2024	2019	2017	—
Jen Beattie		DF	143	24	2008	2022	2019	—	—
Pauline Hamill		FW	141	29	1992	2010	—	—	—
Kim Little		MF	140	59	2007	2021	2019	—	Played for Great Britain in the 2012 and 2020 Olympics.
Leanne Ross		MF	133	9	2006	2017	—	2017	—
Megan Sneddon		MF	130	4	2002	2014	—	—	—
Ifeoma Dieke		DF	123	0	2004	2017	—	2017	Played for Great Britain in the 2012 Olympics.
Caroline Weir*		MF	122	32	2013	2026	2019	2017	Played for Great Britain in the 2020 Olympics.
Julie Fleeting		FW	121	116	1996	2015	—	—	—
Rhonda Jones		DF	117	4	1998	2013	—	—	—
Lisa Evans		FW	115	17	2011	2024	2019	2017	—
Hayley Lauder		MF	106	9	2010	2024	2019	2017	—
Suzanne Grant		FW	104	12	2000	2013	—	—	—
Nicky Grant		MF	98	7	1993	2006	—	—	—
Frankie Brown		DF	96	0	2008	2019	—	2017	—
Erin Cuthbert*		MF	89	25	2016	2026	2019	2017	—
Michelle Barr		DF	87	1	1996		—	—	—
Christie Harrison-Murray		MF	81	5	2010	2024	2019	2017	—
Claire Emslie*		FW	77	17	2013	2026	2019	—	—
Nicola Docherty*		DF	75	2	2011	2026	2019	—	—
Emma Mukandi		DF	75	7	2011	2024	—	—	—
Julie Smith		DF	73	0	1998		—	—	—
Leanne Crichton		MF	72	3	2006	2020	2019	2017	—
Sophie Howard*		DF	67	4	2017	2026	2019	2017	—
Amanda Burns		FW	65	2	1999	2008	—	—	—
Stacey Cook		MF	65	6	2000	2008	—	—	—
Lee Gibson*		GK	65	0	2017	2025	2019	2017	—
Pauline MacDonald		DF	65	0	1992	2003	—	—	—
Kirsty Smith*		DF	65	0	2014	2025	2019	2017	—
Fiona Brown		FW	61	2	2015	2024	2019	2017	—
Shelley Kerr		DF	59	3	1989	2008	—	—	National team manager 2017–2020
Kirsty McBride		MF	59	2	2003	2010	—	—	—
Martha Thomas*		FW	54	21	2020	2026	—	—	—
Kirsty Hanson*		FW	50	6	2019	2026	—	—	—
Linda Brown		FW	48	20	1983		—	—	—
Joelle Murray		MF	48	1	2007	2019	2019	2017	—
Rachael Boyle		MF	43	0	2010	2021	—	—	—
Emma Fernon		DF	42	1	2009	2014	—	—	—
Debbie McWhinnie		FW	41	11		2004	—	—	—
Lana Clelland		FW	40	5	2012	2022	2019	2017	—
Lizzie Arnot		FW	39	3	2015	2022	2019	—	—
Denise Brolly		MF	39	2		2007	—	—	—
Rachel McLauchlan*		DF	39	0	2016	2026	—	2017	—
Jenna Clark*		DF	36	5	2021	2026	—	—	—
Margaret McGough		GK	36	0	1974	1985			
Chloe Arthur		MF	35	2	2015	2022	2019	2017	—
Julie Ferguson		DF	35	0	2003	2009	—	—	—
Mhairi Gilmour		MF	35	3	1996	2004	—	—	—
Lauren Davidson*		FW	34	4	2021	2026	—	—	—
Samantha Kerr*		MF	34	1	2020	2025	—	—	—
Karen Penglase		DF	34	3	1999	2002	—	—	—
Donna James		FW	33	4	2000	2003	—	—	—
Suzanne Mulvey		FW	32	4	2003	2014	—	—	—
Shannon Lynn		GK	31	0	2010	2020	2019	2017	—
Amy McDonald		DF	27	1	2005	2009	—	—	—
Sheila Begbie		DF	25	0	1972		—	—	—
Lucy Hope		MF	24	0	2017	2022	—	—	—
Eilish McSorley		DF	20	0	2012	2015	—	—	—
Chelsea Cornet*		MF	19	1	2023	2026	—	—	—
Abi Harrison		FW	19	3	2018	2023	—	—	—
Kirsty Maclean*		MF	19	0	2023	2026	—	—	—
Claire Smith		DF	19	4	1996	1998	—	—	—
Christy Grimshaw*		MF	18	3	2021	2026	—	—	—
Claire Johnstone		GK	18	0	2000	2007	—	—	—
Amy Muir*		DF	16	0	2020	2026	—	—	—
Jamie-Lee Napier		MF	15	0	2023	2024	—	—	—
Emma Lawton*		DF	14	2	2025	2026	—	—	—
Sandy MacIver*		GK	14	0	2023	2026	—	—	—
Kathleen McGovern*		FW	12	7	2025	2026	—	—	—
Amy Rodgers*		MF	12	0	2023	2025	—	—	—
Natalie Ross		DF	12	0	2008	2021	—	—	—
Hollie Thomson		MF	12	1	2006	2009	—	—	—
Emma Watson		MF	12	3	2023	2025	—	—	—
Diana Barry		FW	11	0	2009	2011	—	—	—
Freya Gregory*		MF	11	0	2025	2026	—	—	—
Suzanne Lappin		MF	11	3	2007	2014	—	—	—
Zoe Ness		FW	11	1	2018	2021	—	—	—
Julia Ralph Scott		MF	11	1	2000	2004	—	—	—
Suzanne Robertson		DF	11	0	2001	2005	—	—	—
Jayne Sommerville		DF	11	0	2005	2007	—	—	—
Jenna Fife		GK	10	0	2018	2023	2019	—	—
Kirsty Howat*		FW	9	2	2024	2026	—	—	—
Miri Taylor*		MF	9	0	2025	2026	—	—	—
Eartha Cumings*		GK	8	0	2022	2025	—	—	—
Brogan Hay		FW	8	0	2022	2024	—	—	—
Pamela Liddell		FW	8	0	2005	2006	—	—	—
Lisa Robertson		MF	8	0	2021	2022	—	—	—
Abbi Grant		FW	7	2	2018	2020	—	—	—
Vaila Barsley		DF	6	0	2017		—	2017	—
Alana Bruce		FW	6	0	2000	2002	—	—	—
Kelly Clark		DF	6	1	2022	2023	—	—	—
Leah Eddie*		DF	6	0	2021	2026	—	—	—
Mia McAulay*		FW	5	0	2025	2026	—	—	—
Rose Reilly		FW	5	2	1972	1975	—	—	Also played for Italy.
Emily Thomson		FW	5	1	2012	2013	—	—	—
Eilidh Adams*		FW	4	0	2025	2026	—	—	—
Sarah Crilly		FW	4	2	2012	2013	—	—	—
Hannah Godfrey		DF	4	1	2019	2020	—	—	—
Alana Marshall		DF	4	0	2011		—	—	—
Maria McAneny*		MF	4	2	2025	2026	—	—	—
Edna Neillis		FW	4	5	1972	1975	—	—	—
Heather Richards		DF	4	0	2014	2015	—	—	—
Georgia Brown*		DF	3	0	2025		—	—	—
Hayley Cunningham		FW	3	0	2008		—	—	—
Rebecca Dempster		DF	3	0	2011	2012	—	—	—
Amy Gallacher		FW	3	0	2023		—	—	—
Joanna Hutcheson		GK	3	0	2008	2009	—	—	—
Jane McFarlane		FW	3	0	2003		—	—	—
Charlotte Newsham*		DF	3	0	2026		—	—	—
Marlene Pearson		FW	3	0	2003		—	—	—
Michelle Sneddon		FW	3	2	1996		—	—	—
Megan Cunningham		GK	2	0	2015		—	—	—
Sarah Ewens		FW	2	0	2024		—	—	—
Siobhan Hunter		DF	2	0	2013		—	—	—
Brianna Westrup		DF	2	0	2021		—	—	—
Jean Hunter		DF	1		1972		—	—	—
Rebecca McAllister		MF	1	0	2022		—	—	—
Shannon McGregor		FW	1	0	2024		—	—	—
Marion Mount		FW	1		1972		—	—	—
Jenny Smith		FW	1	0	2023		—	—	—
Mary Carr		FW			1972		—	—	—
June Hunter		DF			1972		—	—	—
Lorraine Kennedy							—	—	—
Margaret McAulay		MF			1972		—	—	—
