= Scotland Women's International Roll of Honour =

List established by the Scottish Football Association

The Scotland Women's International Roll of Honour is a list established by the Scottish Football Association. The list recognises players who have gained 50 or more international caps for the Scotland women's national football team. The roll of honour was launched in 2017 with a 100-cap threshold, when 12 players had already achieved that distinction. Since then, Rachel Corsie (2018), Hayley Lauder (2019) and Lisa Evans (2023) have also passed the 100-appearance milestone.

== Players on the roll of honour ==
As of after the match vs. Czech Republic on 13 October 2026

*	Still active for the national team

Name	Image	Position	Career	Caps	Goals	Notes	Ref(s)
Gemma Fay	Gemma Fay	Goalkeeper	1998–2017	203	0		
Joanne Love	Joanne Love	Midfielder	2002–2019	191	13		
Rachel Corsie	Rachel Corsie	Defender	2009–2025	155	20		
Jane Ross	Jane Ross	Forward	2009–2024	151	62		
Jen Beattie	Jen Beattie	Defender	2008–2022	143	24		
Pauline Hamill	Pauline Hamill	Forward	1992–2010	141	29		
Kim Little	Kim Little	Midfielder	2007–2021	140	59		
Leanne Ross	Leanne Ross	Defender	2006–2017	133	9		
Megan Sneddon	Megan Sneddon	Midfielder	2002–2014	130	4		
Ifeoma Dieke	Ifeoma Dieke	Defender	2004–2017	123	0		
Caroline Weir*	Caroline Weir	Midfielder	2013–	122	32		
Julie Fleeting	Julie Fleeting	Forward	1996–2015	121	116		
Rhonda Jones	Rhonda Jones	Defender	1998–2013	117	4		
Lisa Evans	Lisa Evans	Forward	2011–2024	115	17		
Hayley Lauder	Hayley Lauder	Midfielder	2010–2024	106	9		
Suzanne Grant	Suzanne Grant	Forward	2000–2013	104	12		
Nicky Grant		Midfielder	1993–2006	98	7		
Frankie Brown	Frankie Brown	Defender	2008–2019	96	0		
Erin Cuthbert*	Erin Cuthbert	Midfielder	2016–	89	25		
Michelle Barr		Defender	1996–2005	87	1		
Christie Harrison-Murray	Christie Murray	Midfielder	2010–2024	81	5		
Claire Emslie*	Claire Emslie	Forward	2013–	77	17		
Nicola Docherty*		Defender	2011–	75	2		
Emma Mukandi	Emma Mukandi	Defender	2011–2024	75	7		
Julie Smith		Defender	1998–2006	73	0		
Leanne Crichton	Leanne Crichton	Midfielder	2006–2020	72	3		
Sophie Howard*	Sophie Howard	Defender	2017–	67	4		
Amanda Burns		Forward	2001–2008	65	2		
Stacey Cook		Midfielder	2000–2008	65	6		
Lee Gibson*	Lee Gibson	Goalkeeper	2017–	65	0		
Pauline MacDonald		Defender	1992–2003	65	0		
Kirsty Smith*	Kirsty Smith	Defender	2014–	65	0		
Fiona Brown	Fiona Brown	Forward	2015–2024	61	2		
Shelley Kerr	Shelley Kerr	Defender	1989–2008	59	3		
Kirsty McBride		Midfielder	2003–2010	59	2		
Martha Thomas*	Martha Thomas	Forward	2020–	54	21		
Kirsty Hanson*	Kirsty Hanson	Forward	2019–	50	6		

== See also ==
- List of Scotland women's international footballers
- List of women's footballers with 100 or more caps
- Scotland Men's International Roll of Honour
