= Mhairi Gilmour =

Scottish footballer (born 1980)

Personal information
- Full name: Mhairi Catherine Gilmour-McGuire
- Date of birth: 9 June 1980 (age 46)
- Place of birth: Scotland
- Positions: Midfielder; forward

Senior career*
Years	Team	Apps	(Gls)
- Ayr United
- Hibernian
2002	Djurgården		
2003–2004	ÍBV	28	(8)
- Hibernian
- Kilwinning Ladies
2013	Celtic		

International career^{‡}
1996–2001	Scotland	39	(2)
- * Club domestic league appearances and goals as of 11:47, 23 July 2013 (UTC) ‡ National team caps and goals as of 16:40, 23 July 2013 (UTC)

Mhairi Catherine Gilmour-McGuire (born 9 June 1980) is a Scottish international footballer who plays as a midfielder or forward. Previously, Gilmour played full-time club football with Djurgårdens of Sweden and ÍBV of Iceland.

Gilmour made her debut for the Scotland women's national team in 1996 against Brazil and went on to win 39 caps, scoring twice. The teenaged Julie Fleeting was Gilmour's contemporary at Ayr United and in the Scottish national team.

In August 2002 Gilmour signed for Swedish Damallsvenskan club Djurgårdens. She also played professionally in Iceland for ÍBV between 2003–2004, alongside compatriot Michelle Barr.
