= UEFA Women's Euro 2017 qualifying Group 1 =

Football tournament stage

Group 1 of the UEFA Women's Euro 2017 qualifying competition consisted of five teams: Iceland, Scotland, Belarus, Slovenia, and Macedonia. The composition of the eight groups in the qualifying group stage was decided by the draw held on 20 April 2015.

The group was played in home-and-away round-robin format. The group winners qualified directly for the final tournament, while the runners-up also qualified directly if they were one of the six best runners-up among all eight groups (not counting results against the fifth-placed team); otherwise, the runners-up advance to the play-offs.

== Standings ==
Pos	Team	Pld	W	D	L	GF	GA	GD	Pts	Qualification	Iceland	Scotland	Slovenia	Belarus	North Macedonia
1	Iceland	8	7	0	1	34	2	+32	21 (Note: Head-to-head results: Scotland 0–4 Iceland, Iceland 1–2 Scotland.)	Final tournament	—	1–2	4–0	2–0	8–0
2	Scotland	8	7	0	1	30	7	+23	21	Final tournament	0–4	—	3–1	7–0	10–0
3	Slovenia	8	3	0	5	21	19	+2	9 (Note: Head-to-head results: Slovenia 3–0 Belarus, Belarus 2–0 Slovenia.)		0–6	0–3	—	3–0	8–1
4	Belarus	8	3	0	5	10	20	−10	9		0–5	0–1	2–0	—	6–2
5	Macedonia	8	0	0	8	4	51	−47	0		0–4	1–4	0–9	0–2	—

Source: UEFA
Rules for classification: Qualification tiebreakers

== Matches ==
Times are CEST (UTC+2) for dates between 29 March and 24 October 2015 and between 27 March and 29 October 2016, for other dates times are CET (UTC+1).

22 September 2015
16:00

Slovenia	0–3	Scotland
	Report	Little 28', 49', 59'

Ajdovščina Stadium, Ajdovščina
Attendance: 794
Referee: Sandra Bastos (Portugal)
22 September 2015
20:45

Iceland	2–0	Belarus
Magnúsdóttir 30'; Brynjarsdóttir 73'	Report

Laugardalsvöllur, Reykjavík
Attendance: 3,013
Referee: Marija Kurtes (Germany)

19 October 2015
15:00

Slovenia	3–0	Belarus
Tibaut 16'; Zver 65'; Linnik 68' (o.g.)	Report

Stanko Mlakar Stadium, Kranj
Attendance: 200
Referee: Lina Lehtovaara (Finland)

22 October 2015
13:30

Macedonia	0–4	Iceland
	Report	M. Viðarsdóttir 9', 29'; Viggósdóttir 12'; Þorsteinsdóttir 17'

Training Centre Petar Miloševski, Skopje
Attendance: 200
Referee: Lois Otte (Belgium)

23 October 2015
20:45

Scotland	7–0	Belarus
J. Ross 44', 67'; Weir 46'; Corsie 53'; Evans 69'; Love 89', 90+2'	Report

Fir Park, Motherwell
Attendance: 1,367
Referee: Carina Vitulano (Italy)

26 October 2015
18:00

Slovenia	0–6	Iceland
	Report	Brynjarsdóttir 15', 86'; Þorsteinsdóttir 20', 65'; M. Viðarsdóttir 70'; Jessen 80'

Lendava Sports Park, Lendava
Attendance: 800
Referee: Esther Azzopardi (Malta)

27 October 2015
13:30

Macedonia	1–4	Scotland
Rochi 44'	Report	Little 22'; Corsie 27', 28'; Weir 31'

Training Centre Petar Miloševski, Skopje
Attendance: 100
Referee: Anastasia Pustovoitova (Russia)

26 November 2015
13:00

Macedonia	0–2	Belarus
	Report	Slesarchik 67'; Avkhimovich 90+3'

Training Centre Petar Miloševski, Skopje
Attendance: 193
Referee: Paula Brady (Republic of Ireland)

29 November 2015
16:05

Scotland	10–0	Macedonia
J. Ross 3', 59', 61', 87'; Love 8', 40', 53'; Beattie 24'; Lauder 27'; Evans 35'	Report

St Mirren Park, Paisley
Attendance: 1,304
Referee: Vesna Budimir (Croatia)

8 April 2016
20:45

Scotland	3–1	Slovenia
J. Ross 19', 45'; Little 52' (pen.)	Report	Erman 42'

St Mirren Park, Paisley
Attendance: 1,367
Referee: Monika Mularczyk (Poland)

12 April 2016
17:00

Belarus	0–5	Iceland
	Report	M. Viðarsdóttir 14'; Þorsteinsdóttir 24', 34', 54'; Brynjarsdóttir 86'

FC Minsk Stadium, Minsk
Attendance: 420
Referee: Gordana Kuzmanović (Serbia)
12 April 2016
19:00

Slovenia	8–1	Macedonia
Tibaut 6', 75'; Ivanuša 47'; Prašnikar 48', 81'; Kralj 60'; Kos 86'; Rogan 90+3' (pen.)	Report	Jakovska 71'

Lendava Sports Park, Lendava
Attendance: 400
Referee: Graziella Pirriatore (Italy)

3 June 2016
17:30

Macedonia	0–9	Slovenia
	Report	Eržen 2', 18'; Prašnikar 23', 57'; Zver 26'; Tibaut 29', 81'; Kralj 31', 88'

Training Centre Petar Miloševski, Skopje
Attendance: 150
Referee: Angelika Soeder (Germany)
3 June 2016
20:00

Scotland	0–4	Iceland
	Report	Gísladóttir 10'; Þorsteinsdóttir 62'; Jónsdóttir 65'; Viðarsdóttir 69'

Falkirk Stadium, Falkirk
Attendance: 2,690
Referee: Jana Adámková (Czech Republic)

7 June 2016
17:00

Belarus	0–1	Scotland
	Report	Love 15'

FC Minsk Stadium, Minsk
Attendance: 450
Referee: Marta Frias Acedo (Spain)
7 June 2016
21:30

Iceland	8–0	Macedonia
Friðriksdóttir 15', 50'; Þorsteinsdóttir 17', 34', 42'; Jensen 25'; Gunnarsdóttir 27'; Brynjarsdóttir 81'	Report

Laugardalsvöllur, Reykjavík
Attendance: 4,270
Referee: Zuzana Valentová (Slovakia)

15 September 2016
17:00

Belarus	6–2	Macedonia
Slesarchik 14'; Shcherbachenia 15'; Avkhimovich 17'; Linnik 28'; Urazaeva 52'; Shuppo 70'	Report	Jakovska 23'; Krstanovska 55'

FC Minsk Stadium, Minsk
Attendance: 320
Referee: Désirée Grundbacher (Switzerland)

16 September 2016
20:45

Iceland	4–0	Slovenia
Gísladóttir 11'; Brynjarsdóttir 21', 46'; Jónsdóttir 68'	Report

Laugardalsvöllur, Reykjavík
Attendance: 6,037
Referee: Olga Zadinová (Czech Republic)

20 September 2016
17:00

Belarus	2–0	Slovenia
Slesarchik 38', 84'	Report

FC Minsk Stadium, Minsk
Attendance: 200
Referee: Maria Marotta (Italy)
20 September 2016
19:00

Iceland	1–2	Scotland
Friðriksdóttir 40'	Report	J. Ross 25', 56' (pen.)

Laugardalsvöllur, Reykjavík
Attendance: 6,468
Referee: Katalin Kulcsár (Hungary)

== Goalscorers ==
10 goals

- (Iceland) Harpa Þorsteinsdóttir
- (Scotland) Jane Ross

7 goals

- (Iceland) Dagný Brynjarsdóttir

6 goals

- (Scotland) Joanne Love

5 goals

- (Iceland) Margrét Lára Viðarsdóttir
- (Scotland) Kim Little
- (Slovenia) Tjaša Tibaut

4 goals

- (Belarus) Yulia Slesarchik
- (Slovenia) Lara Prašnikar

3 goals

- (Iceland) Fanndís Friðriksdóttir
- (Scotland) Rachel Corsie
- (Slovenia) Barbara Kralj

2 goals

- (Belarus) Ekaterina Avkhimovich
- (Iceland) Hallbera Guðný Gísladóttir
- (Iceland) Gunnhildur Jónsdóttir
- (North Macedonia) Eli Jakovska
- (Scotland) Lisa Evans
- (Scotland) Caroline Weir
- (Slovenia) Kaja Eržen
- (Slovenia) Mateja Zver

1 goal

- (Belarus) Anastasia Linnik
- (Belarus) Anastasia Shcherbachenia
- (Belarus) Anastasia Shuppo
- (Belarus) Elvira Urazaeva
- (Iceland) Sara Björk Gunnarsdóttir
- (Iceland) Elín Metta Jensen
- (Iceland) Sandra Jessen
- (Iceland) Hólmfríður Magnúsdóttir
- (Iceland) Glódís Perla Viggósdóttir
- (North Macedonia) Simona Krstanovska
- (North Macedonia) Gentjana Rochi
- (Scotland) Jen Beattie
- (Scotland) Hayley Lauder
- (Slovenia) Kristina Erman
- (Slovenia) Lara Ivanuša
- (Slovenia) Evelina Kos
- (Slovenia) Manja Rogan

1 own goal

- (Belarus) Anastasia Linnik (playing against Slovenia)
