= Joanne Love =

Scottish footballer (born 1985)

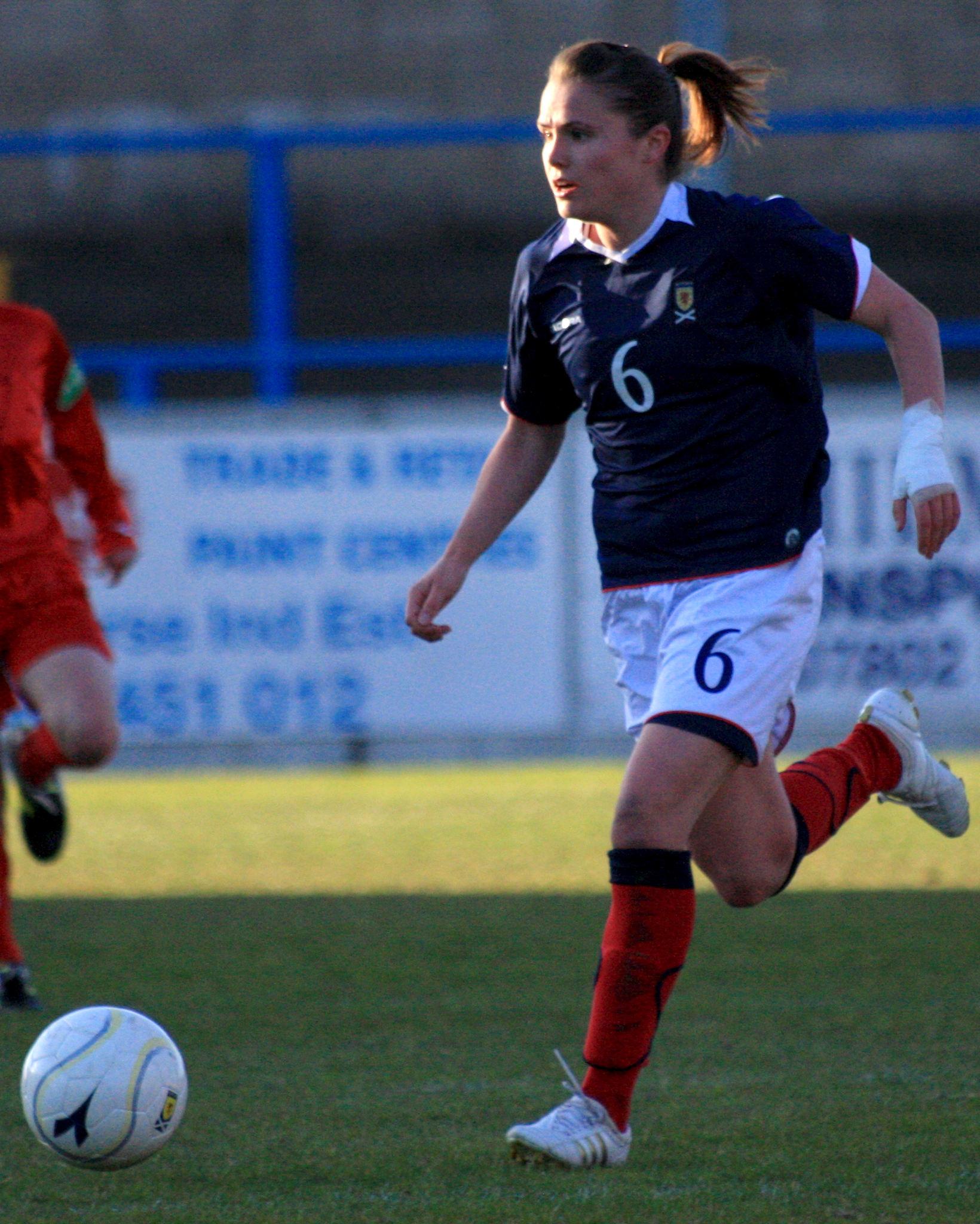

Personal information
- Date of birth: 6 December 1985 (age 40)
- Place of birth: Paisley, Scotland
- Height: 5 ft 3 in (1.60 m)
- Position: Midfielder

Team information
- Current team: Partick Thistle
- Number: 6

Youth career
- Largs Girls

Senior career*
Years	Team	Apps	(Gls)
2000–2006	Kilmarnock Ladies		
2006	Cocoa Expos		
2006–2007	Doncaster Rovers Belles		
2007–2011	Celtic		
2011–2025	Glasgow City	267	(96)
2025–	Partick Thistle	10	(1)

International career^{‡}
2002–	Scotland	191	(13)
- * Club domestic league appearances and goals as of 18:43, 21 November 2025 (UTC) ‡ National team caps and goals as of 8 April 2019

Joanne Love (born 6 December 1985) is a Scottish international footballer who plays as a midfielder for Partick Thistle. She has previously played for Glasgow City, Kilmarnock and Celtic, in the English FA Women's Premier League for Doncaster Rovers Belles and in the United States for Cocoa Expos.

Making her international debut aged 16, Love became the fourth player to make a century of appearances, behind Pauline Hamill, Julie Fleeting and Gemma Fay. She last appeared for her country in 2019, claiming her 191st cap at the age of 33. This total makes her Scotland's all time leading appearance holder.

== Club career ==
Born in Paisley and raised in Kilbirnie, Love began her career with Kilmarnock. In 2006 she played in the American W-League for Cocoa Expos.

After three years at Celtic, Love signed for rivals Glasgow City in February 2011; she remained with the club for over a decade, winning multiple Scottish Women's Premier League championships and cups and featuring in the UEFA Women's Champions League.

Outside football Love is a scientist who works as a chemical analyst for Glasgow City Council.

== International career ==
In March 2000, Love was called up to the Scotland under-18 team at the age of 14. She made her senior debut for Scotland in the 2002 Algarve Cup during a 3–0 defeat to Canada and scored her first international goal against France in a February 2004 friendly match.

Love reached 100 caps in March 2011 in a 1–0 loss to Canada during the 2011 Cyprus Cup. She was awarded her 150th cap in a friendly match against Wales in August 2014. By the time of her 191st and last cap in a friendly victory against Brazil in April 2019, she was the national record holder for appearances by an outfield player (she was named in the squad for the 2019 FIFA Women's World Cup two months after that, but did not feature in Scotland's three matches – unlike at the UEFA Women's Euro 2017 tournament where she was introduced as a substitute in the first two matches and started in the third, a win over Spain).

A football training programme for young girls operated by Ayrshire College is named in her honour.

=== International goals ===
Scores and results list Scotland's goal tally first. Goal against France in Feb 2004 not included in SFA profile.

#	Date	Venue	Opponent	Result	Competition	Scored
1	18 February 2004	Stade Louis Michel, Sète	France	1–1	Friendly	1
2	6 May 2006	Richmond Park, Dublin	Republic of Ireland	2–0	2007 FIFA Women's World Cup qual.	1
3	10 March 2008	Alpha Sports Centre, Larnaca	Canada	2–0	Friendly	1
4	13 February 2011	Bridge Meadow Stadium, Haverfordwest	Wales	4–2	Friendly	1
5	16 June 2012	Tynecastle Stadium, Edinburgh	Israel	8–0	2013 UEFA Women's Championship qual.	1
6	15 July 2012	Chris Anderson Stadium, Aberdeen	Cameroon	2–0	Friendly	1
7	15 September 2012	Parc y Scarlets, Llanelli	Wales	2–1	2013 UEFA Women's Championship qual.	1
8	31 October 2013	Dyskobolia Stadium, Grodzisk Wielkopolski	Poland	4–0	2015 FIFA Women's World Cup qual.	1
10	23 October 2015	Fir Park, Motherwell	Belarus	7–0	UEFA Women's Euro 2017 qualifying	2
13	29 November 2015	St Mirren Park, Paisley	North Macedonia	10–0	UEFA Women's Euro 2017 qualifying	3
14	7 June 2016	FC Minsk Stadium, Minsk	Belarus	1–0	UEFA Women's Euro 2017 qualifying	1

== See also ==
- List of women's footballers with 100 or more international caps
- Scottish FA Women's International Roll of Honour
