= Jim Fleeting (footballer) =

Scottish football player and manager (1955–2026)

Personal information
- Full name: James Taylor Fleeting
- Date of birth: 8 April 1955
- Place of birth: Glasgow, Scotland
- Date of death: 15 March 2026 (aged 70)
- Position: Centre half

Youth career
- Kilbirnie Ladeside

Senior career*
Years	Team	Apps	(Gls)
1976–1977	Norwich City	1	(0)
1977–1978	→ Tampa Bay Rowdies (loan)	28	(2)
1978–1983	Ayr United	146	(6)
1983–1984	Clyde	2	(0)
1984–1985	Greenock Morton	5	(1)
1985–1986	Clyde	19	(1)
Total		173	(8)

Managerial career
- 1988–1989: Stirling Albion
- 1989–1992: Kilmarnock
- 1998: Scotland (women)
- * Club domestic league appearances and goals

James Taylor Fleeting (8 April 1955 – 15 March 2026) was a Scottish football player and manager.

== Career ==
A centre half, Fleeting began his professional career with Norwich City, making one appearance before joining Ayr United, where he stayed for six years. He went on to play for Clyde and Greenock Morton (where he was assistant manager to Willie McLean), before joining Clyde again. He was appointed manager of Stirling Albion in the summer of 1988, then joined Kilmarnock as manager from 1989 to 1992.

In 1998, he served as the women's national team coach, prior to the appointment of Vera Pauw.

He later worked as the director of football development for the Scottish Football Association, training coaches at the National Sports Centre in Largs.

== Personal life and death ==
Fleeting was the father of former Scotland women's national team player Julie Fleeting.

He died on 15 March 2026, at the age of 70.
