= Julie Fleeting =

Scottish footballer (born 1980)

Julie Fleeting MBE
- Fleeting in 2006

Personal information
- Full name: Julie Stewart
- Birth name: Julie Fleeting
- Date of birth: 18 December 1980 (age 45)
- Place of birth: Kilwinning, Scotland
- Height: 5 ft 9 in (1.75 m)
- Position: Forward

Youth career
- Cunninghame Boys Club
- Crosshouse Boys Club

Senior career*
| Years | Team | Apps | (Gls) |
| 1996–2002 | Ayr United Ladies | | |
| 2002–2003 | San Diego Spirit | 26 | (14) |
| 2003 | Ross County Ladies | | |
| 2004–2012 | Arsenal Ladies | | |
| 2006 | → Valur (loan) | 2 | (4) |
| 2013 | Kilwinning Ladies | 4 | (3) |
| 2013–2015 | Celtic Ladies | 7 | (5) |
| 2015–2016 | Glasgow City | | |

International career
- Scotland U16
- Scotland U20
| 1996–2015 | Scotland | 121 | (116) |
- * Club domestic league appearances and goals

Julie Stewart MBE (née Fleeting; born 18 December 1980) is a Scottish former footballer who played as a forward. She spent nine years at English club Arsenal and was the first Scot to play as a full-time professional in the WUSA playing for San Diego Spirit. She won the Scottish Women's League title with Ayr and seventeen major trophies with Arsenal.

According to the Scottish Football Association, Fleeting has a record of 116 goals (a national record by some distance) and 121 caps for Scotland between her debut in 1996 and retirement in 2015, although those figures appear to include unofficial internationals. Fleeting also captained her country for eight years. According to UEFA, she has a record of 28 goals in 22 games in UEFA competitions for national teams, and 22 goals in 32 games in UEFA club competitions.

She was appointed a Member of the Order of the British Empire (MBE) in the 2008 Birthday Honours. She has also represented Scotland in the sport of basketball.

== Early and personal life ==
Fleeting's father is former professional player and Scottish Football Association Director of Football Development Jim Fleeting. Former Kilmarnock owner Bobby Fleeting is her uncle. She also has a brother named Barry who played football at Junior level.

Fleeting attended St Winning's Primary School in Kilwinning, Ayrshire for her primary education and St Michael's Academy in Kilwinning, Ayrshire for her secondary education. While still at school, Fleeting showed talent in basketball (she played for Cunninghame Basketball Club and represented her country in the sport) and field hockey (she played for Eglinton Ladies Hockey Club and had a trial for the national side) as well as football.

A teacher by profession, she has taught Physical Education in St Michael's Academy in Kilwinning in North Ayrshire; St Matthew's Academy in Saltcoats, North Ayrshire; Charleston Academy, Inverness and—since 2008—Auchenharvie Academy in Stevenston, North Ayrshire. Fleeting married goalkeeper Colin Stewart in June 2005. They became a couple when Fleeting was playing for Ayr United and Stewart was coming through the youth ranks at Kilmarnock, having met through Jim Fleeting's friendship with Colin's father Jim Stewart. The wedding at St Mary's Church in Irvine was attended by Scottish football notables including Tommy Burns, Jim Leighton and Ian Durrant. Fleeting, known to teammates as Fleets, retained her maiden name for football purposes. On 23 December 2008, Fleeting announced she was pregnant with her first child and ruled herself out of participation in the remainder of the football season. She gave birth to a daughter on 27 July 2009. In February 2012, it was reported that Fleeting and husband Colin were expecting their second child. The girl was born on 28 April 2012. Fleeting had a third child, born in 2017.

In 2007, Fleeting was named as Scotland's Sports Personality of the Year. She was appointed Member of the Order of the British Empire (MBE) in the 2008 Birthday Honours, collecting the medal in November of that year in a Buckingham Palace ceremony hosted by Prince Charles. In June 2009, Fleeting was inducted into the University of Edinburgh's Sports Hall of Fame alongside Graeme Randall, Gregor Townsend and Chris Hoy. In 2011, Fleeting became an ambassador of Street Soccer for women's football in 2011.

== Club career ==
=== Early career ===
Fleeting began her football career aged nine with Cunninghame Boys under-10s. Fleeting, the only girl playing in the entire league, also helped St Winning's Primary School beat 1,000 other schools to the 1992 national championship. The competition was sponsored by Tudor Crisps and Fleeting's school prevailed 1–0 in the final at Ibrox Stadium. She joined Prestwick Girls when SFA rules barred her from mixed football at age 12. In April 1995, Fleeting scored twice as Prestwick beat Cumbernauld Cosmos 7–5 in the final of the Under-16 Scottish Cup. The following season, Prestwick came under the auspices of Ayr United, and the Sunday Mail newspaper was already describing Fleeting as: "the most gifted young footballer in Scotland." After finishing school in 1998, she resisted overtures from American Universities to continue playing for Ayr while training to become a PE teacher at Moray House School of Education. Fleeting explained that: "I was only young when I had to decide which university to go to, and at the time, Edinburgh was far enough away from home. But when I graduate I will still only be 21 and young enough to go abroad if I want to."

In the 2001 Scottish Women's Cup final at Almondvale Stadium, Fleeting scored a hat-trick but Ayr lost on penalties to local rivals Kilmarnock after a 3–3 draw. Having already won the league championship, Ayr manager Hugh Flynn consoled his players with the prospect of participation in the following season's inaugural UEFA Women's Cup. In November 2001, Ayr hosted the group stage mini tournament after original hosts Toulouse had their ground damaged by an explosion at a factory. Fleeting found the net in draws with Osijek and Chernihiv but Ayr were eliminated after a third draw with Toulouse.

As the 2001–02 season, progressed and graduation neared, Fleeting began to consider her options: "I'm considering America but as it's the top league in the world the competition will be fierce. Italy or England are possibilities although it's a shame I must leave Scotland to make a career in football." When an offer came to join San Diego Spirit in June 2002, Fleeting departed Ayr United after nine years, as the club captain and with around 300 goals to her credit. She did so with the blessing of national team coach Vera Pauw, who had encouraged Fleeting to turn professional and make a living from the sport.

=== United States ===
In moving to California, Fleeting signed a one-year contract, with an option for a further three years. She arrived mid-season, with San Diego Spirit languishing near the foot of the WUSA table. The move had been called into question when the coach who signed Fleeting was sacked, but general manager and interim coach Kevin Crow sanctioned the deal. On 10 July 2002, Fleeting made her professional debut, setting up San Diego's first goal in a 3–2 defeat at Boston Breakers four minutes after entering play as a 54th-minute substitute. Four days later she played her second match and scored her first goal, driving Shannon MacMillan's centre off the underside of the crossbar from 18 yards to put San Diego 2–1 ahead in a 2–2 draw at home to San Jose CyberRays. In Fleeting's third game on 20 July 2002, she scored a last-minute winner from close range as San Diego beat New York Power 1–0 at Mitchel Athletic Complex. She started a single-goal defeat to Washington Freedom, before bringing her goal tally to three in five games by putting San Diego ahead at home to Atlanta Beat. Unfortunately for Fleeting, Homare Sawa then scored twice as the Beat won 4–1 and extinguished the Spirit's hopes of making the play-offs.

Fleeting finished the campaign with three goals and one assist from eight games including seven starts. Of San Diego's four allotted foreign players, Fleeting was the only one regularly starting games by the end of the season as the club finished seventh. She returned to Scotland during the off-season but expressed delight at the whole experience and was keen to return for more the following season: "I got to live near the beach on the California coast and play football as my job – it was amazing and I'd be delighted to go back." The Daily Record newspaper contrasted the poor performances of Scotland's male footballers with Fleeting's exploits in "setting the biggest women's football league in the world alight".

Fleeting's American teammates had initially named her Shrek, on account of her accent. An unimpressed Fleeting joked that she would prefer Fat Bastard, since the latter was actually Scottish. During the 2003 WUSA season, she acquired a new nickname of Air Scotland after scoring a number of goals with her head. She had missed most of Spirit's pre-season while playing for Scotland but managed a 20-minute substitute appearance in an opening day defeat to Boston Breakers. The squad was much changed from the previous season and Fleeting now paired with Canadian striker Christine Latham in attack. Fleeting scored in the next four consecutive games, equalling the club record as San Diego began a seven-match unbeaten run. The team then hit a slump when Shannon MacMillan, the main supplier of Fleeting's goals, tore her anterior cruciate ligament. After scoring her ninth goal of the season, the equaliser in a 1–1 home draw with New York Power, Fleeting controversially mimicked a urinating dog whilst celebrating.

In the 2003 regular season, Fleeting scored 11 goals from her 17 starts and single substitute appearance. San Diego finished third and qualified for the play-offs, where Aly Wagner put them ahead against Atlanta Beat, only for Conny Pohlers to level the match in the 90th minute. Charmaine Hooper won the semi-final tie for Atlanta with a golden goal in extra-time. Fleeting was named the team MVP at the end of year dinner, while her 11 goals and four assists were enough to clinch the club Golden Boot. In addition, Fleeting was named to the All-WUSA Second Team.

=== Return to Scotland ===
Following the season Fleeting's next stop was the Scottish Highlands where partner Colin Stewart had transferred from Kilmarnock to Ross County. Fleeting had several Premier League outfits vying for her signature upon her return to Scotland. She signed on loan for Ross County's women's section and scored twice in a 5–3 win over Raith Rovers two days later. She explained: "I'm just happy to play anywhere. But I was going to be spending a lot of time up there seeing Colin anyway so it makes sense." Later in September 2003 WUSA collapsed with reported debts of $100m. Fleeting had also arrived back in Scotland just as her old club Ayr United folded. In December she was forced to miss some Ross County games in order to rest, but was still hopeful that the American professional league could be resurrected in some form: "I'm really hoping something comes of this. It will be great if it does all go ahead but I'm just waiting to see what happens at the moment. The target seems to be a restart of the full league in 2005 but with a series of exhibition games this year, which will still involve the foreign players."

=== Arsenal ===
What does she add? Goals.

— Arsenal manager Vic Akers on Fleeting in 2005

In January 2004, Fleeting signed for English club Arsenal Ladies. Under the terms of the agreement, Fleeting would continue to work as a PE teacher in Scotland from Monday to Friday and would train twice a week with the Under-21 section of local men's club Kilwinning Rangers. On Sunday mornings, Fleeting was to catch a budget airline flight to London, where she would be met by Arsenal manager Vic Akers. After being briefed by Akers during the journey, Fleeting would then play in the match for Arsenal before flying back to Scotland late on Sunday evening. It was an arrangement which was to continue throughout Fleeting's time at Arsenal, despite the extensive travelling involved. In 2007, Fleeting said: "I can understand that people raise eyebrows about playing but not training with Arsenal. But when I arrive, they always give me a good briefing and, if there's something special that they've been working on during the week, it's explained to me before the game. It hasn't been a problem so far!"

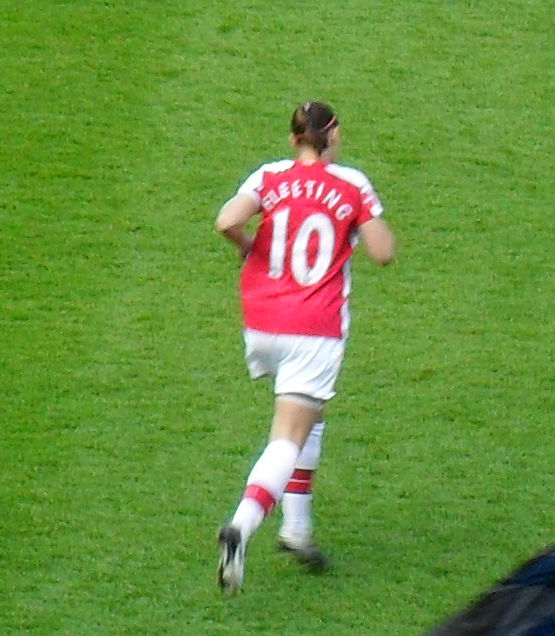
Fleeting in her Arsenal no. 10 shirt

==== 2003–04 ====
Fleeting bagged a brace on her Arsenal debut, in a 6–1 FA Women's Cup fifth round win over Middlesbrough played on 25 January 2004. In the next round of the Cup, played on 7 February, she scored a hat-trick in Arsenal's 11–1 demolition of Cardiff City, being substituted during the second half in order to catch an early flight home.

Fleeting continued to score regularly and hit the winner in 2–1 league victory at Leeds United on 7 March. Two weeks later, Fleeting scored in a 4–0 win at home to the same opponents. On the intervening weekend, she had scored the opening goal in a 2–0 semi final win over Bristol Rovers in the FA Cup. In April, Fleeting scored the only goal of the game against Charlton Athletic to leave the Gunners only two points behind Charlton in the league with a game in hand. Fleeting hit a hat-trick in an 8–0 destruction of relegated Aston Villa at home on 18 April, bringing her tally to 12 goals in eight appearances.

On 3 May, Fleeting scored a hat-trick for Arsenal in their FA Women's Cup Final win over Charlton Athletic, just a day after suffering a calf injury while playing the full game for Scotland and scoring against reigning World Champions Germany. It took her record to fifteen goals in nine games for Arsenal since joining in January. Arsenal sealed the league title on 15 May, as Fleeting scored the second goal in a 3–1 victory over Fulham before 5,000 fans at Highbury Stadium. Fleeting finished the season with sixteen goals from ten appearances.

==== 2004–05 ====
In November 2004, Fleeting scored in the UEFA Women's Cup quarter final second leg victory over Torres. She fired the decisive goal in a 3–2 win, with only eight minutes remaining. In December, Fleeting scored all three goals in Arsenal's Premier League Cup semi-final victory against Birmingham City.

In February 2005, Fleeting netted twice in a 3–0 over Birmingham City in the quarter-finals of the FA Cup.

Fleeting hit a total of 24 goals for Arsenal over the course of the season, while she was the recipient of the FA Women's Players' Player of the Year at the end of season annual FA awards for women's football in England.

==== 2005–06 ====
In January 2006, Fleeting scored twice in a 4–1 defeat of Cardiff City in an FA Cup fourth round match. In January, she followed this up by scoring the opener and winning the penalty that made it 2–0 in a 3–0 victory over Aston Villa in a fifth round match of the FA Cup.

In February, Fleeting netted the first goal for Arsenal in a 6–1 defeat of Sunderland.

On 1 May, Fleeting scored in a 5–0 FA Cup final win against Leeds United. Fleeting hit a total of 17 goals in 15 appearances for Arsenal throughout the season, before spending the summer of 2006 on a month's loan in Iceland with Valur. Husband Colin was also in Iceland at the time, playing for Grindavík. Fleeting netted four times in three games for Valur before returning to the UK.

==== 2006–07 ====
Fleeting was an integral part of the all-conquering Arsenal side that won an unprecedented six trophies; Premier League, FA Cup, Premier League Cup, Community Shield, London FA Cup and UEFA Women's Cup. Fleeting went on to play the full 180 minutes of the two-legged final as Arsenal overcame Umeå 1–0 on aggregate.

In September 2006, Fleeting hit five out of the 11 goals scored by Arsenal in their first two UEFA Women's Cup second round group stage matches in wins over Rossiyanka and Budapest

In October, in the UEFA Women's Cup quarter finals, Fleeting notched a double in the 5–0 first leg home win on the 12th and the opener in the 4–1 second leg victory on the 19th against Breiðablik. In domestic competition, Fleeting broke the deadlock against Everton as Arsenal prevailed 4–1. She scored in the semi-final return leg in the UEFA Women's Cup against Brondby in a 3–0 victory in December.

==== 2007–08 ====
In October 2007, Fleeting netted three times for Arsenal in the second round group stages of the UEFA Women's Cup. On 13 October, Fleeting bagged a brace in a 7–0 win over Neulengbach and on 16 October, she hit the opener in the final group game; a 3–3 draw against Bardolino Verona.

In February 2008, Fleeting scored twice in a 5–2 win over Liverpool. Later that month she played as Arsenal were shocked 1–0 by Everton in the FA Women's Premier League Cup Final. It was Arsenal's first defeat in 58 domestic matches, stretching back two years. In the 2008 FA Women's Cup Final against Leeds United, Fleeting entered play as a 75th-minute substitute. Her shot which hit the post was turned in by teammate Kelly Smith for Arsenal's final goal in their 4–1 win.

==== 2008–09 to 2012 ====
In November 2008, Fleeting scored against Umeå at home in the UEFA Women's Cup quarter final first leg to make it 2–2, before a late goal from Kim Little won the game for Arsenal. Fleeting watched the return leg from the substitutes' bench, as Arsenal were thrashed 6–0.

In December 2008, Fleeting announced she would be taking time out from the game on the advice of Arsenal's medical team, after discovering she was pregnant with her first child. With her due date at some point in July 2009, it meant she would be unavailable until the following summer at the earliest.

In April 2010, a few days after appearing in her first matches for Scotland since taking time out from the game, she scored the first goal in Arsenal's FA Cup semi-final win over Chelsea. Fleeting who had just returned to regular action, having not played a full ninety minutes all season, was identified by Arsenal manager Laura Harvey as the player who could "inspire" Arsenal to a fifth successive Premier League and FA Cup double. In May's FA Women's Cup Final, Fleeting scored Arsenal's second equaliser of the match to level the scores at 2–2 against Everton but Arsenal lost 3–2 in extra time.

Fleeting scored the second goal in Arsenal's 2–0 win over Bristol Academy in the 2011 FA Women's Cup Final in May. In the inaugural 2011 FA WSL, Fleeting scored twice in her 11 appearances for champions Arsenal.

=== Return to Scotland ===
==== 2013 ====
On 1 March 2013, SWPL newcomers Kilwinning SC announced they had signed Fleeting. Her debut resulted in a 10–0 SWPL Cup defeat at Celtic two days later. It was her first competitive match after 18 months away from football. Kilwinning manager Craig Hamilton stated Fleeting could be the difference between survival and relegation for the club. She made her league debut in the club's first ever top flight fixture, registering an assist for the first goal, in a 3–2 defeat at Hutchison Vale on 17 March 2013. Her first goal for the club came, when she opened the scoring, in a 2–1 home league defeat to Aberdeen two weeks later. Fleeting returned to the team, in a 2–1 league defeat at Hamilton Academical on 12 May 2013, winning the resulting free-kick, which made 1–1. She scored twice inside the last five minutes, having previously won a penalty as well, to help Kilwinning recover from 4–2 down to win 5–4 in a home defeat of Falkirk one week later, which secured the club's first league win of the season. Fleeting left Kilwinning in June 2013, when she had her registration with the club cancelled.

It was reported in The Scotsman newspaper on 24 July 2013 that Fleeting had made a high-profile summer transfer to Kilwinning's SWPL rivals Celtic. Fleeting hit a hat-trick on her Celtic debut, in a 9–0 friendly victory over Piedmont College two days later. She marked her competitive Celtic debut with a goal, in a 3–0 home league win over Spartans two days later again. Fleeting opened the scoring, in a 2–2 league draw at Aberdeen on 4 August 2013. Two weeks later, Fleeting scored her first competitive hat-trick for Celtic, in a 9–1 Scottish Women's Cup home defeat of Queen's Park. This included a clever tight-angled overhead kick and a perfectly executed volley. She netted twice to help Celtic recover from 1–0 down and put them 2–1 up, in a 4–1 league win at Glasgow rivals Rangers on 1 September 2013. Fleeting netted fives times, in a 10–0 Scottish Women's Cup victory over Viewfield Rovers at home one week later. She scored the decisive goal, in a 2–1 home league win over Aberdeen on 29 September 2013. Fleeting also played in the Scottish Women's Cup semi-final defeat to Glasgow City, which Celtic lost 3–0 on 6 October 2013. Her last appearance of the season came as a second-half substitute in the last SWPL match of the season, in a 2–1 win against Rangers, a result which secured a third-place finish for Celtic. Fleeting was earmarked as the catalyst for a resurgent Celtic side, who had a slow first half of the season, since signing in July 2013. She was integral as Celtic secured a top three finish and reached the Scottish Women's Cup semi-finals.

==== 2014 ====
Fleeting began the new SWPL season with a goal in a 5–0 victory at Aberdeen in Celtic's opening game. Fleeting made it 3–0, after slotting home from an acute angle. The following week, two Fleeting headers, either side of half-time gave Celtic a 2–0 home win over Hutchison Vale. In a 4–0 home defeat of Hamilton Academical in the SWPL Cup on 13 April, Fleeting converted all four of Celtic's second half goals. In a 10–0 home demolition of bottom team Buchan on 27 April, Fleeting made it back-to-back hat-tricks in matches, taking her early season tally to ten goals in four matches. Fleeting netted twice in an 8–1 home thrashing of Queen's Park on 18 May. Flagged grabbed an obligatory goal in a 3–1 victory at Hamilton Academical on 23 May. She opened the scoring with a volley, after only three minutes. In a 3–2 defeat at Hibernian on 10 August, Fleeting broke the deadlock after rounding off a well-worked team move. Fleeting scored the winner in 3–2 home win over Spartans on 24 August. Fleeting would miss the second half of the season with injury.

It was reported that Celtic were looking to cut back their involvement in women's football. And as a result of this, a mass exodus of the first team squad left the club, with a number of players' citing their frustration at the club's lack of ambition. It is understood Fleeting was one of those that had not yet committed for the 2015 season. and is possibly considering a move to another club, but has not officially left the club yet.

==== 2015 ====
It was announced on 19 March 2015 that Fleeting had joined SWPL champions Glasgow City. Fleeting finally made her debut, playing the first 45 minutes, in a 4–1 win at Aberdeen in the Scottish Women's Cup on 9 August 2015. Prior to her debut she had been out with a number of niggling injuries, with only one week of proper training under her belt, but had received a call-up to a Scotland training camp in early August. She made her league debut, again playing the first 45 minutes and setting-up the opening goal, in a 3–3 home draw with Hibernian one week later. Fleeting scored her first goals for the club, with a second half brace, in a 7–0 home league win over Rangers on 30 August 2015. She grabbed her first hat-trick for City, with a second half treble, in a 6–0 league win at former club Celtic six days later. Fleeting opened the scoring for City, in an 11–0 Scottish Women's Cup home win against Kilmarnock on 13 September 2015.

==== 2016 ====
Fleeting gave City a 1–0 half-time lead, in a 2–1 defeat to Hibernian, in the 2016 SWPL Cup final on 16 June 2016. She registered two more league goals, in an 8–0 home win over Forfar Farmington on 31 July 2016. Fleeting scored a brace, in a 4–0 league win at Hibernian on 14 August 2016. She notched another brace a week later, in a 7–0 home league defeat of Rangers.

== International career ==
Fleeting was called up to the national under-16 team at the age of 14. She made her senior Scotland debut, aged 15, against Wales at Somerset Park in November 1996. In January 1997, Fleeting was part of a youthful Scotland squad who toured Brazil; suffering three straight friendly defeats to their hosts. When Scotland played an Auld Enemy fixture in August 1997, it was reported that the Scots had been "pinning their hopes of an upset" on the teenaged Fleeting.

Fleeting represented Scotland in the 1999 World Cup qualifiers. Starting with away games in Estonia and Lithuania, Fleeting scored four in Scotland's 7–1 win in Tallinn and three in a 5–0 win in Vilnius. In May 1998, she scored twice in a 7–0 win over Estonia at Somerset Park, then headed the equalising goal in a 1–1 draw with the Czech Republic in Inverness. With Scotland competing at the 'B' level of UEFA competition—and ineligible to qualify—they needed a final win over Lithuania and a 16–goal swing to overhaul the Czech Republic and win the group. Fleeting hit four goals, including a decisive injury time header, as Scotland won 17–0 to top the group and secure a play-off against Spain for promotion to the 'A' grade. She was unable to make an impression as Spain consigned the Scots (coached by Julie's father Jim) to further participation at 'B' level.

In September 2000, Fleeting scored 16 goals in one match; a 27–0 win over the Isle of Man in the Celt Cup, a quadrangular tournament held in Carryduff and also featuring Northern Ireland and the Republic of Ireland. She continued to score at a prolific rate during the 2001 UEFA Women's Championship qualification campaign, scoring one and setting up the others as Ireland were beaten 3–0 at Broadwood in the opening fixture. She added two more in the return match in Dublin, another 3–0 win. Fleeting also netted twice in a fractious 4–1 win over Croatia at Forthbank Stadium.

Fleeting was handed the captaincy by Vera Pauw in early 2001. In October 2001, Fleeting marked the occasion of her fiftieth cap with a four-goal haul in Scotland's 5–1 win over Wales at Almondvale. Fleeting was part of the Scotland team that took on the Auld Enemy in a friendly at Prenton Park in April 2005. Fleeting's first goal against England, was the equaliser, but it couldn't prevent Scotland losing an own goal in the dying minutes as they lost 2–1. The previous night, Fleeting had scored the winner in a 2–1 victory over England in a behind closed doors training match.

In a 2009 European Championship qualifier in October 2007, Fleeting scored her one hundredth goal for Scotland in a 3–0 victory in Slovakia. She was later presented with a specially designed Scotland top from sponsors, Tennent's and a pair of golden boots by her boot Sponsor, Nomis, in celebration of achieving such a phenomenal feat. The SFA announced their own plans to commemorate her "momentous" achievement with a special presentation before Scotland's home game against Italy in November. A few days later, Fleeting reached another milestone, when she won her one hundredth cap against Denmark at McDiarmid Park in another qualification match. SFA Chief Executive Gordon Smith made a special presentation prior to the match in her honour.

In 2009, Gemma Fay took over the captain's armband on a permanent basis from Fleeting, who was awaiting the birth of her first child. Fleeting would still occasionally captain her country when she returned. In March 2010, Fleeting made her long-awaited Scotland return in 3–1 win in Georgia in a 2011 World Cup qualifier. It was her first game back in Scotland colours, since returning from time out of the game. Five days later, Fleeting returned to her goalscoring exploits by bagging four goals in an 8–1 hammering of Bulgaria at the Falkirk Stadium in another World Cup qualifier. After that match, her international record stood at 111 goals in 111 caps for Scotland.

In June 2011, Scotland's record goalscorer, ruled herself out of contention for being picked for Great Britain women's team at the 2012 Summer Olympics. She concurred with the opinion of her father, the Scottish FA's director of football development, Jim Fleeting that participation may "jeopardise" the Scottish national team.

The 1–0 friendly victory against Belgium in August 2011, in which Fleeting scored the solitary goal, proved to be her last involvement with her country for more than three years. In that time, Fleeting missed two major championship qualifying campaigns and gave birth to her second daughter in 2012. The reason Fleeting missed Scotland's 2013 UEFA Women's Championship qualifiers was due to the pregnancy and birth of her second daughter. Her then record stood at 116 goals in 120 caps.

Fleeting returned to the international fold in January 2015, when Anna Signeul included her in the Scotland squad for an upcoming training camp. Signeul stated Fleeting may yet play a pivotal role in Scotland's 2017 UEFA Women's Championship qualifiers. Fleeting finally won her 121st cap in a 4–0 friendly victory against Northern Ireland in Belfast, coming on as a second-half substitute in February 2015.

== Style of play ==
Fleeting was a striker, mainly deployed as a centre-forward, which was undoubtedly her strongest position because of her ability to "play through the middle". Referred to as "big" and "very strong", she was also cited for being a "fantastic target player" and someone who "wins everything in the air".

Fleeting, most known for her prolific goalscoring ability, was often praised for her ability to score a goal out of nothing. When asked, "What does she add? Arsenal manager Vic Akers replied of Fleeting: Goals." She is also known for being a "great finisher" and an "extremely good header of the ball".

When finally recalled to the Scotland squad in January 2015, manager Anna Signeul referred to Fleeting as a "special player" and "tactically very knowledgeable". Signeul said of her "We don't have a player like that in the squad, and have not had one since she was last in the side."

== Career statistics ==
=== Official caps and goals ===
Scores and results list Scotland's goal tally first.

| Game | Date | Competition | Venue | Opponent | Result | Goals | Ref |
|---|---|---|---|---|---|---|---|
| ## | 17.11.96 | Friendly | Ayr, Scotland | Wales | 0-2 | 0 | |
| ## | 14.12.96 | Friendly | São Paulo, Brazil | Brazil | 1–7 | ? | |
| ## | 12.12.96 | Friendly | São Paulo, Brazil | Brazil | 0–6 | 0 | |
| ## | 10.12.96 | Friendly | São Paulo, Brazil | Brazil | 0–5 | 0 | |
| ## | 23.08.97 | Friendly | Livingston, Scotland | England | 0–4 | 0 | |
| ## | 03.09.97 | 1999 FIFA WCQ | Tallinn, Estonia | Estonia | 7–1 | 4 | |
| ## | 07.09.97 | 1999 FIFA WCQ | Vilnius, Lithuania | Lithuania | 5–0 | 3 | |
| ## | 03.05.98 | 1999 FIFA WCQ | Ayr, Scotland | Estonia | 7–0 | 2 | |
| ## | 23.05.98 | 1999 FIFA WCQ | Inverness, Scotland | Czech Republic | 1–1 | 1 | |
| ## | 31.05.98 | 1999 FIFA WCQ | Glasgow, Scotland | Lithuania | 17–0 | 4 | |
| ## | 13.09.98 | 1999 FIFA WCQ P/O | Stirling, Scotland | Spain | 0–3 | 0 | |
| ## | 11.10.98 | 1999 FIFA WCQ P/O | Cordoba, Spain | Spain | 1–4 | 1 | |
| ## | 16.12.98 | Friendly | Zeist, Netherlands | Netherlands | 0–1 | 0 | |
| ## | 13.03.99 | 1999 Albena Cup | Varna, Bulgaria | Romania | 3–3 | 1 | |
| ## | 14.04.99 | 1999 Albena Cup | Varna, Bulgaria | Moldova | 5–0 | 3 | |
| ## | 10.05.99 | Friendly | Airdrie, Scotland | France | 3–4 | 2 | |
| ## | 03.10.99 | 2001 UEFA ECQ | Cumbernauld, Scotland | Republic of Ireland | 3–0 | 1 | |
| ## | 29.04.00 | 2001 UEFA ECQ | Dublin, Republic of Ireland | Republic of Ireland | 3–0 | 2 | |
| ## | 14.05.00 | 2001 UEFA ECQ | Stirling, Scotland | Croatia | 4–1 | 2 | |
| ## | 18.09.00 | Friendly | Veenendaal, Netherlands | Netherlands | 1–3 | 1 | |
| ## | 19.09.00 | Friendly | Veenendaal, Netherlands | Belarus | 2–2 | 2 | |
| ## | 29.11.00 | Friendly | Dumfries, Scotland | Northern Ireland | 9–0 | 4 | |
| ## | 27.05.01 | Friendly | Bolton, England | England | 0–1 | 0 | |
| ## | 17.01.01 | Friendly | Vibo Valentia, Italy | Italy | 0–3 | 0 | |
| ## | 12.08.01 | Friendly | Dublin, Scotland | Republic of Ireland | 1–4 | 1 | |
| ## | 28.10.01 | 2003 FIFA WCQ | Livingston, Scotland | Wales | 5–1 | 4 | |
| ## | 03.03.02 | 2002 Algarve Cup | Lagoa, Portugal | Portugal | 2–1 | 2 | |
| ## | 05.03.02 | 2002 Algarve Cup | Silves, Portugal | Wales | 1–0 | 1 | |
| ## | 21.04.02 | 2003 FIFA WCQ | Livingston, Scotland | Belgium | 4–0 | 2 | |
| ## | 05.05.02 | 2003 FIFA WCQ | Livingston, Scotland | Austria | 5–0 | 3 | |
| ## | 19.05.02 | 2003 FIFA WCQ | Merthyr Tydfil, Wales | Wales | 2–0 | 1 | |
| ## | 08.09.02 | Friendly | Columbus, Ohio, United States | United States | 2–8 | 1 | |
| ## | 10.03.03 | Friendly | Livingston, Scotland | China | 0–1 | 0 | |
| ## | 18.05.03 | 2005 UEFA ECQ | Livingston, Scotland | Ukraine | 5–1 | 3 | |
| ## | 07.06.03 | 2005 UEFA ECQ | Nelas, Portugal | Portugal | 8–1 | 5 | |
| ## | 01.10.03 | Friendly | Livingston, Scotland | Netherlands | 0–2 | 0 | |
| ## | 13.11.03 | Friendly | Preston, England | England | 0–5 | 0 | |
| ## | 17.01.04 | Friendly | Agios Kosmas, Greece | Greece | 3–0 | 2 | |
| ## | 21.02.04 | Friendly | Montpellier, France | France | 3–6 | 2 | |
| ## | 10.03.04 | Friendly | Reykjavík, Iceland | Iceland | 1–5 | 1 | |
| ## | 02.05.04 | 2005 UEFA ECQ | Livingston, Scotland | Germany | 1–3 | 1 | |
| ## | 19.08.04 | Friendly | Dingwall, Scotland | Switzerland | 6–0 | 3 | |
| ## | 05.09.04 | 2005 UEFA ECQ | Dingwall, Scotland | Czech Republic | 3–2 | 1 | |
| ## | 21.04.05 | Friendly | Birkenhead, England | England | 1–2 | 1 | |
| ## | 06.05.06 | 2007 FIFA WCQ | Dublin, Ireland | Republic of Ireland | 2–0 | 1 | |
| ## | 03.08.06 | Friendly | Perth, Scotland | Finland | 0–0 | 0 | |
| ## | 26.08.06 | 2007 FIFA WCQ | Willisau. Switzerland | Switzerland | 1–1 | 1 | |
| ## | 06.09.06 | Friendly | Wavre, Belgium | Belgium | 3–0 | 1 | |
| ## | 23.09.06 | 2007 FIFA WCQ | Perth, Scotland | Germany | 0–5 | 0 | |
| ## | 14.02.07 | Friendly | Achna, Cyprus | Japan | 0–2 | 0 | |
| ## | 17.02.07 | Friendly | Larnaca, Cyprus | Sweden | 0–1 | 0 | |
| ## | 11.03.07 | Friendly | High Wycombe, England | England | 0–1 | 0 | |
| ## | 06.04.07 | Friendly | Perth, Scotland | Italy | 2–1 | 1 | |
| ## | 06.05.07 | 2009 UEFA ECQ | Perth, Scotland | Portugal | 0–0 | 0 | |
| ## | 30.05.07 | 2009 UEFA ECQ | Mariupol, Ukraine | Ukraine | 1–2 | 1 | |
| ## | 26.08.07 | Friendly | Perth, Scotland | Belgium | 3–2 | 3 | |
| ## | 26.09.07 | Friendly | Turku, Finland | Finland | 0–1 | 0 | |
| ## | 29.09.07 | Friendly | Helsinki, France | Finland | 1–4 | 1 | |
| ## 99 (100) | 27.10.07 | 2009 UEFA ECQ | Senec, Slovakia | Slovakia | 3–0 | 1 | |
| ## 100 (100) | 31.10.07 | 2009 UEFA ECQ | Perth, Scotland | Denmark | 0–1 | 0 | |
| ## | 07.03.08 | 2008 Cyprus Cup | Paralimni, Cyprus | Netherlands | 0–1 | 0 | |
| ## | 03.05.08 | 2009 UEFA ECQ | Póvoa do Varzim, Portugal | Portugal | 4–1 | 3 | |
| ## | 28.05.08 | 2009 UEFA ECQ | Perth, Scotland | Ukraine | 0–1 | 0 | |
| ## | 17.09.08 | Friendly | Perth, Scotland | Switzerland | 4–0 | 2 | |
| ## | 28.09.08 | 2009 UEFA ECQ | Perth, Scotland | Slovakia | 6–0 | 2 | |
| ## | 30.10.08 | 2009 UEFA ECQ PO | Nalchik, Russia | Russia | 2–1 | 0 | |
| ## | 24.02.10 | 2010 Cyprus Cup | Nicosia, Cyprus | Netherlands | 1–4 | 0 | |
| ## | 01.03.10 | 2010 Cyprus Cup | Larnaca, Cyprus | New Zealand | 0–3 | 0 | |
| ## | 03.03.10 | 2010 Cyprus Cup | Larnaca, Cyprus | South Africa | 2–1 | 0 | |
| ## | 27.03.10 | 2011 FIFA WCQ | Tbilisi, Georgia | Georgia | 3–1 | 0 | |
| ## | 01.04.10 | 2011 FIFA WCQ | Falkirk, Scotland | Bulgaria | 8–1 | 4 | |
| ## | 23.05.10 | Friendly | Dumbarton, Scotland | Northern Ireland | 2–0 | 0 | |
| ## | 05.06.10 | Friendly | Wohlen, Switzerland | Switzerland | 3–3 | 0 | |
| ## | 08.06.10 | Friendly | Zug, Switzerland | Switzerland | 1–0 | 1 | |
| ## | 19.06.10 | 2011 FIFA WCQ | Sofia, Bulgaria | Bulgaria | 5–0 | 1 | |
| ## | 24.06.10 | Friendly | Kilmarnock, Scotland | Denmark | 0–1 | 0 | |
| ## | 21.08.10 | 2011 FIFA WCQ | Dumbarton, Scotland | Greece | 4–1 | 1 | |
| ## | 18.05.11 | Friendly | Brest, France | France | 1–1 | 0 | |
| ## | 21.08.11 | Friendly | Falkirk, Scotland | Switzerland | 5–0 | 1 | |
| ## | 23.08.11 | Friendly | Falkirk, Scotland | Belgium | 1–0 | 1 | |
| ## | 08.02.15 | Friendly | Belfast, Northern Ireland | Northern Ireland | 4–0 | 0 | |

=== Unofficial caps and goals ===
Scores and results list Scotland's goal tally first.

| Game | Date | Competition | Venue | Opponent | Result | Goals | Ref |
|---|---|---|---|---|---|---|---|
| ## | 23.09.00 | 2000 Celt Cup | Carryduff, Republic of Ireland | Isle of Man | 27–0 | 16 | |
| ## | 20.04.05 | Closed Doors Training match | Birkenhead, England | England | 2–1 | 1 | |
| ## | 05.03.08 | 2008 Cyprus Cup | Paralimni, Cyprus | United States U20 | 1–2 | 0 | |

=== International goals ===
| No. | Date | Venue | Opponent | Score | Result | Competition |
|---|---|---|---|---|---|---|
| 1. | 3 September 1997 | Tallinn, Estonia | Estonia | 1–0 | 7–1 | 1999 FIFA Women's World Cup qualification |
| 2. | 3 September 1997 | Tallinn, Estonia | Estonia | 3–0 | 7–1 | 1999 FIFA Women's World Cup qualification |
| 3. | 3 September 1997 | Tallinn, Estonia | Estonia | 6–0 | 7–1 | 1999 FIFA Women's World Cup qualification |
| 4. | 3 September 1997 | Tallinn, Estonia | Estonia | 7–0 | 7–1 | 1999 FIFA Women's World Cup qualification |
| 5. | 7 September 1997 | Vilnius, Lithuania | Lithuania | 1–0 | 5–0 | 1999 FIFA Women's World Cup qualification |
| 6. | 7 September 1997 | Vilnius, Lithuania | Lithuania | 2–0 | 5–0 | 1999 FIFA Women's World Cup qualification |
| 7. | 7 September 1997 | Vilnius, Lithuania | Lithuania | 3–0 | 5–0 | 1999 FIFA Women's World Cup qualification |
| 8. | 3 May 1998 | Ayr, Scotland | Estonia | 2–0 | 7–0 | 1999 FIFA Women's World Cup qualification |
| 9. | 3 May 1998 | Ayr, Scotland | Estonia | 5–0 | 7–0 | 1999 FIFA Women's World Cup qualification |
| 10. | 23 May 1998 | Inverness, Scotland | Czech Republic | 1–1 | 1–1 | 1999 FIFA Women's World Cup qualification |
| 11. | 30 May 1998 | Glasgow, Scotland | Lithuania | 9–0 | 17–0 | 1999 FIFA Women's World Cup qualification |
| 12. | 30 May 1998 | Glasgow, Scotland | Lithuania | 10–0 | 17–0 | 1999 FIFA Women's World Cup qualification |
| 13. | 30 May 1998 | Glasgow, Scotland | Lithuania | 15–0 | 17–0 | 1999 FIFA Women's World Cup qualification |
| 14. | 30 May 1998 | Glasgow, Scotland | Lithuania | 17–0 | 17–0 | 1999 FIFA Women's World Cup qualification |
| 15. | 11 October 1998 | Córdoba, Spain | Spain | 1–0 | 1–4 | 1999 FIFA Women's World Cup qualification |
| 16. | 9 May 1999 | Airdrie, Scotland | France | 1–0 | 3–4 | Friendly |
| 17. | 9 May 1999 | Airdrie, Scotland | France | 2–1 | 3–4 | Friendly |
| 18. | 3 October 1999 | Cumbernauld, Scotland | Republic of Ireland | 2–0 | 3–0 | UEFA Women's Euro 2001 qualifying |
| 19. | 23 October 1999 | Poreč, Croatia | Croatia | 2–1 | 3–4 | UEFA Women's Euro 2001 qualifying |
| 20. | 23 October 1999 | Poreč, Croatia | Croatia | 3–3 | 3–4 | UEFA Women's Euro 2001 qualifying |
| 21. | 14 November 1999 | Cumbernauld, Scotland | Czech Republic | 1–1 | 2–1 | UEFA Women's Euro 2001 qualifying |
| 22. | 14 November 1999 | Cumbernauld, Scotland | Czech Republic | 2–1 | 2–1 | UEFA Women's Euro 2001 qualifying |
| 23. | 29 April 2000 | Dublin, Ireland | Republic of Ireland | 1–0 | 3–0 | UEFA Women's Euro 2001 qualifying |
| 24. | 29 April 2000 | Dublin, Ireland | Republic of Ireland | 2–0 | 3–0 | UEFA Women's Euro 2001 qualifying |
| 25. | 14 May 2000 | Stirling, Scotland | Croatia | 3–1 | 4–1 | UEFA Women's Euro 2001 qualifying |
| 26. | 14 May 2000 | Stirling, Scotland | Croatia | 4–1 | 4–1 | UEFA Women's Euro 2001 qualifying |
| 27. | 13 August 2000 | Etten Leur, Belgium | Belgium | 1–0 | 3–4 | Friendly |
| 28. | 13 August 2000 | Etten Leur, Belgium | Belgium | 2–0 | 3–4 | Friendly |
| 29. | 13 August 2000 | Etten Leur, Belgium | Belgium | 3–2 | 3–4 | Friendly |
| 30. | 26 August 2000 | Blšany, Czech Republic | Czech Republic | 1–0 | 1–5 | UEFA Women's Euro 2001 qualifying |
| 31. | 18 September 2000 | Veenendaal, Netherlands | Netherlands | 1–1 | 1–3 | Friendly |
| 32. | 19 September 2000 | Veenendaal, Netherlands | Belarus | 1–2 | 2–2 | Friendly |
| 33. | 19 September 2000 | Veenendaal, Netherlands | Belarus | 2–2 | 2–2 | Friendly |
| 34. | 28 October 2001 | Livingston, Scotland | Wales | 1–1 | 5–1 | 2003 FIFA Women's World Cup qualification |
| 35. | 28 October 2001 | Livingston, Scotland | Wales | 2–1 | 5–1 | 2003 FIFA Women's World Cup qualification |
| 36. | 28 October 2001 | Livingston, Scotland | Wales | 4–1 | 5–1 | 2003 FIFA Women's World Cup qualification |
| 37. | 28 October 2001 | Livingston, Scotland | Wales | 5–1 | 5–1 | 2003 FIFA Women's World Cup qualification |
| 38. | 3 March 2002 | Lagoa, Portugal | Portugal | 1–0 | 2–1 | 2002 Algarve Cup |
| 39. | 3 March 2002 | Lagoa, Portugal | Portugal | 2–1 | 2–1 | 2002 Algarve Cup |
| 40. | 5 March 2002 | Silves, Portugal | Wales | 1–0 | 1–0 | 2002 Algarve Cup |
| 41. | 21 April 2002 | Livingston, Scotland | Belgium | 2–0 | 4–0 | 2003 FIFA Women's World Cup qualification |
| 42. | 21 April 2002 | Livingston, Scotland | Belgium | 4–0 | 4–0 | 2003 FIFA Women's World Cup qualification |
| 43. | 5 May 2002 | Livingston, Scotland | Austria | 1–0 | 5–0 | 2003 FIFA Women's World Cup qualification |
| 44. | 5 May 2002 | Livingston, Scotland | Austria | 2–0 | 5–0 | 2003 FIFA Women's World Cup qualification |
| 45. | 5 May 2002 | Livingston, Scotland | Austria | 4–0 | 5–0 | 2003 FIFA Women's World Cup qualification |
| 46. | 19 May 2002 | Merthyr Tydfil, Wales | Wales | 2–0 | 2–0 | 2003 FIFA Women's World Cup qualification |
| 47. | 8 September 2002 | Columbus, United States | United States | 1–1 | 2–8 | Friendly |
| 48. | 13 May 2003 | Livingston, Scotland | Ukraine | 3–1 | 5–1 | UEFA Women's Euro 2005 qualifying |
| 49. | 13 May 2003 | Livingston, Scotland | Ukraine | 4–1 | 5–1 | UEFA Women's Euro 2005 qualifying |
| 50. | 13 May 2003 | Livingston, Scotland | Ukraine | 5–1 | 5–1 | UEFA Women's Euro 2005 qualifying |
| 51. | 7 June 2003 | Nelas, Portugal | Portugal | 3–0 | 8–1 | UEFA Women's Euro 2005 qualifying |
| 52. | 7 June 2003 | Nelas, Portugal | Portugal | 4–0 | 8–1 | UEFA Women's Euro 2005 qualifying |
| 53. | 7 June 2003 | Nelas, Portugal | Portugal | 5–0 | 8–1 | UEFA Women's Euro 2005 qualifying |
| 54. | 7 June 2003 | Nelas, Portugal | Portugal | 6–0 | 8–1 | UEFA Women's Euro 2005 qualifying |
| 55. | 7 June 2003 | Nelas, Portugal | Portugal | 7–1 | 8–1 | UEFA Women's Euro 2005 qualifying |
| 56. | 7 June 2003 | Nelas, Portugal | Portugal | 8–1 | 8–1 | UEFA Women's Euro 2005 qualifying |
| 57. | 21 February 2004 | Montpellier, France | France | 2–1 | 3–6 | Friendly |
| 58. | 21 February 2004 | Montpellier, France | France | 3–2 | 3–6 | Friendly |
| 59. | 2 May 2004 | Livingston, Scotland | Germany | 1–1 | 1–3 | UEFA Women's Euro 2005 qualifying |
| 60. | 5 September 2004 | Dingwall, Scotland | Czech Republic | 2–2 | 3–2 | UEFA Women's Euro 2005 qualifying |
| 91. | 6 May 2006 | Dublin, Ireland | Republic of Ireland | 2–0 | 2–0 | 2007 FIFA Women's World Cup qualifying |
| 92. | 26 August 2006 | Willisau, Switzerland | Switzerland | 1–1 | 1–1 | 2007 FIFA Women's World Cup qualifying |
| 93. | 6 September 2006 | Wavre, Belgium | Belgium | 3–0 | 3–0 | Friendly |
| 94. | 6 April 2007 | Perth, Scotland | Italy | 1–1 | 2–1 | Friendly |
| 95. | 30 May 2007 | Mariupol, Ukraine | Ukraine | 1–2 | 1–2 | UEFA Women's Euro 2009 qualifying |
| 96. | 26 August 2007 | Perth, Scotland | Belgium | 1–1 | 3–2 | Friendly |
| 97. | 26 August 2007 | Perth, Scotland | Belgium | 2–1 | 3–2 | Friendly |
| 98. | 26 August 2007 | Perth, Scotland | Belgium | 3–1 | 3–2 | Friendly |
| 99. | 29 September 2007 | Helsinki, Finland | Finland | 1–2 | 1–4 | Friendly |
| 100. | 27 October 2007 | Senec, Slovakia | Slovakia | 3–0 | 3–0 | UEFA Women's Euro 2009 qualifying |
| 101. | 3 May 2008 | Póvoa de Varzim, Portugal | Portugal | 2–0 | 4–1 | UEFA Women's Euro 2009 qualifying |
| 102. | 3 May 2008 | Póvoa de Varzim, Portugal | Portugal | 3–0 | 4–1 | UEFA Women's Euro 2009 qualifying |
| 103. | 3 May 2008 | Póvoa de Varzim, Portugal | Portugal | 4–0 | 4–1 | UEFA Women's Euro 2009 qualifying |
| 104. | 17 September 2008 | Perth, Scotland | Switzerland | 1–0 | 4–0 | Friendly |
| 105. | 17 September 2008 | Perth, Scotland | Switzerland | 2–0 | 4–0 | Friendly |
| 106. | 28 September 2008 | Perth, Scotland | Slovakia | 2–0 | 6–0 | UEFA Women's Euro 2009 qualifying |
| 107. | 28 September 2008 | Perth, Scotland | Slovakia | 5–0 | 6–0 | UEFA Women's Euro 2009 qualifying |
| 108. | 1 April 2010 | Falkirk, Scotland | Bulgaria | 3–1 | 8–1 | 2011 FIFA Women's World Cup qualification |
| 109. | 1 April 2010 | Falkirk, Scotland | Bulgaria | 4–1 | 8–1 | 2011 FIFA Women's World Cup qualification |
| 110. | 1 April 2010 | Falkirk, Scotland | Bulgaria | 6–1 | 8–1 | 2011 FIFA Women's World Cup qualification |
| 111. | 1 April 2010 | Falkirk, Scotland | Bulgaria | 8–1 | 8–1 | 2011 FIFA Women's World Cup qualification |
| 112. | 8 June 2010 | Zug, Switzerland | Switzerland | 1–0 | 1–0 | Friendly |
| 113. | 19 June 2010 | Sofia, Bulgaria | Bulgaria | 2–0 | 5–0 | 2011 FIFA Women's World Cup qualification |
| 114. | 21 August 2010 | Dumbarton, Scotland | Greece | 2–1 | 4–1 | 2011 FIFA Women's World Cup qualification |
| 115. | 21 August 2011 | Falkirk, Scotland | Switzerland | 2–0 | 5–0 | Friendly |
| 116. | 23 August 2011 | Falkirk, Scotland | Belgium | 1–0 | 1–0 | Friendly |

== Honours ==
Ayr United Ladies

- Scottish Women's League: 2000–01
- Scottish Women's Cup runner-up: 2000–01

Arsenal Ladies

- UEFA Women's Cup: 2006–07
- FA WSL: 2011
- FA Women's Premier League (7): 2003–04, 2004–05, 2005–06, 2006–07, 2007–08, 2008–09, 2009–10
- FA Women's Cup: 2003–04, 2005–06, 2006–07, 2007–08, 2010–11; runner-up: 2009–10
- FA Women's Premier League Cup: (Note: Fleeting missed the 2006–07 and 2008–09 finals. The latter due to pregnancy. However, she played in several earlier rounds of the 2006–07 and 2008–09 editions.) 2004–05, 2006–07, 2008–09; runner-up: 2005–06, 2007–08
- FA Community Shield runner-up: 2004 (Note: Fleeting did not play in Arsenal's wins in 2005, 2006 or 2008. The competition was not held in 2007 due to the 2007 FIFA Women's World Cup, nor in 2009 due to the UEFA Women's Euro 2009.)

Glasgow City

- SWPL: 2015, 2016
- Scottish Women's Cup: 2015
- SWPL Cup runner-up: 2016

Scotland

- Albena Cup runner-up: 1999

Individual

- 1998–99 Eva Baily Cup (Note: The Eva Bailly Cup was awarded to the University's most distinguished female athletic performance of the year.) (Note: Fleeting was also a key member of the Lillywhite Shield award winning University's women's football team. It was awarded to the University's most outstanding club of the year.)
- 1999 Albena Cup: Player of the Tournament
- 2003 San Diego Spirit: Most Valuable Player
- 2003 San Diego Spirit: Golden Boot
- 2003 All-WUSA Second Team
- 2003 Soccer America WUSA XI
- 2004–05 FA Women's Players' Player of the Year
- 2007 Daily Record Sporting Hero of the Year
- 2008 FIT Scotland Sports Personality of the Year
- 2008 Evening Times Sportswoman of the Year
- 2004 Nominated for BBC Scotland Sports Personality of the Year

Awards

- MBE (Awarded in 2008)
- University of Edinburgh's Sports Hall of Fame (Inducted in 2009)
- Scottish Football Hall of Fame (Inducted in 2018)
- Scottish FA Women's International Roll of Honour (Inaugural inductee in 2017)

== See also ==
- List of women footballers with 300 or more goals
- List of women's footballers with 100 or more international goals
- List of footballers with 100 or more caps
- Scottish FA Women's International Roll of Honour
