= Karen Penglase =

Scottish footballer (born 1982)

Personal information
- Full name: Karen Penglase
- Date of birth: 10 August 1982 (age 44)
- Place of birth: Glasgow, Scotland
- Height: 5 ft 4 in (1.63 m)
- Position: Defender

Senior career*
| Years | Team | Apps | (Gls) |
| –2001 | Stenhousemuir/Cumbernauld United | | |
| 2001–2002 | Ayr United | | |
| 2002 | Grindavík | 10 | (4) |
| 2002–2005 | Kilmarnock | | |
| 2005–2008 | Hamilton Academical | | |
| 2006 | Keflavík Football Club | 12 | (3) |
| 2008–2012 | Celtic | | |
| 2013–? | Rangers | | |

International career
| 1999–2002 | Scotland | 34 | (3) |
- * Club domestic league appearances and goals

Karen Penglase (born 10 August 1982) is a Scottish former international football defender. She played in the Scottish Women's Premier League for Kilmarnock, Hamilton Academical, Celtic and Rangers. She also played semi-professionally in Iceland with Grindavík and Keflavík. Penglase represented the Scotland women's national football team at full international level.

== Club career ==
Playing for Stenhousemuir in 1999–00, Penglase scored in a 9–0 Scottish Women's Cup final win over Clyde. In May 2002 Penglase joined Grindavík. After a spell with Kilmarnock, Penglase returned to Iceland in summer 2006, with Keflavík Football Club.

She signed for Celtic from Hamilton Academical in 2008.

After a spell playing and coaching in Australia in 2012, Penglase signed for Rangers for the 2013 Scottish Women's Premier League season under the management of her former Kilmarnock teammate Angie Hind.

== International career ==
Penglase was first called up to the senior Scotland squad at the age of seventeen in 1999.

During Scotland's 2001 UEFA Women's Championship qualification campaign, Penglase scored in a fractious 4–1 win over Croatia at Forthbank Stadium in May 2000. She remained a regular pick throughout Scotland's 2003 World Cup qualifying fixtures.

== Personal life ==
Penglase attended Reid Kerr College, studying for an HND in Sports Coaching and Development. During her spell at Celtic she worked as a lifeguard.
