= Barbara Kralj =

Slovenian footballer

Personal information
- Full name: Barbara Kralj
- Date of birth: 5 January 1994 (age 32)
- Place of birth: Slovenia
- Position: Midfielder

Team information
- Current team: ŽNK Olimpija Ljubljana

International career^{‡}
Years	Team	Apps	(Gls)
2010	Slovenia U17	3	(0)
2010–2012	Slovenia U19	9	(1)
2011–	Slovenia	21	(3)
- ‡ National team caps and goals as of 20:14, 16 April 2016 (UTC)

Barbara Kralj (born 5 January 1994) is a Slovenian midfielder.
