= Evelina Kos =

Slovenian footballer

Personal information
- Date of birth: 21 October 1996 (age 30)
- Place of birth: Nova Gorica, Slovenia
- Position: Defender

Team information
- Current team: LASK
- Number: 6

Senior career*
| Years | Team | Apps | (Gls) |
| 2011–2016 | Velesovo | 87 | (29) |
| 2016–2017 | Pomurje | 12 | (7) |
| 2017–2022 | Olimpija Ljubljana | 92 | (27) |
| 2022–2026 | Pomurje / Mura | 49 | (13) |
| 2026– | LASK | 2 | (0) |

International career
| 2011–2012 | Slovenia U17 | 5 | (0) |
| 2013–2015 | Slovenia U19 | 9 | (3) |
| 2014–2023 | Slovenia | 35 | (2) |
- * Club domestic league appearances and goals as of 12 May 2026

Evelina Kos (born 21 October 1996) is a Slovenian footballer who plays as a defender for ÖFB Frauen Bundesliga club LASK.

== Honours ==
Olimpija Ljubljana

- Slovenian League: 2016–17, 2017–18
- Slovenian Cup: 2020–21, 2021–22

Mura

- Slovenian League: 2022–23, 2023–24, 2024–25
- Slovenian Cup: 2022–23, 2023–24
