= Julie Smith (footballer) =

Scottish footballer (born 1973)

Personal information
- Date of birth: 3 October 1973 (age 53)
- Position: Defender

Youth career
- 1982-???: Stewarton Thistle Ladies

Senior career*
Years	Team	Apps	(Gls)
-2009	Kilmarnock		

International career
1998-2006	Scotland	75	((???))
- * Club domestic league appearances and goals

Julie Smith (born 3 October 1973) is a Scottish former footballer who played as a defender. She spent her entire club career at Kilmarnock, and was capped 75 times by the Scottish national team between 1998 and 2006.

== Career ==
Smith joined Stewarton Thistle Ladies at the age of nine, and spent her entire playing career at the club (later renamed FC Kilmarnock Ladies in 1999). She was a member of the Kilmarnock team that won the Scottish Women's Football League title in 2001/02, as well as the inaugural Scottish Women's Premier League title in 2002/03. Smith was also part of the Kilmarnock team that won the Scottish Women's Cup consecutively in 2001 and 2002, before finishing runners-up to Hibernian in 2003. She retired at the end of the 2008/09 season at the age of 35, after Kilmarnock narrowly avoided relegation from the Premier League.

Smith won her first of 75 international caps against Spain in September 1998, and remained a regular in the Scottish national side until her retirement from international football in October 2006. She won her 50th cap in Scotland's 5-1 victory over Ukraine in a Euro 2005 qualifying match at Almondvale Stadium, Livingston. In April 2005, Smith scored a decisive own goal against England at Prenton Park, in a 2-1 defeat for Scotland.

== Personal life ==
During her playing career, Smith worked as a development scientist in Edinburgh.

== Honours ==
=== Club ===
==== Kilmarnock ====
- Scottish Women's Football League
  - Winners: 2001/02
- Scottish Women's Premier League
  - Winners: 2002/03
- Scottish Women's Cup
  - Winners: 2000/01, 2001/02
  - Runners-up: 2002/03
