= Nomis (company) =

Shoe manufacturer headquartered in Australia

- Type: Football (soccer) and rugby
- Industry: Sportswear and Sports Goods
- Founded: Australia to Switzerland
- Headquarters: Australia
- Products: Footwear; Accessories; Sportswear

Nomis is an Australian football shoe manufacturer founded by former Adidas senior vice president Simon Skirrow. It distributes its shoes in the United Kingdom, United States, Germany, Australia and New Zealand.

Skirrow spent five years creating the boots, which are made from kangaroo leather. 'Nomis' is an anagram of 'Simon'. Nomis shoes are specifically developed for improved performance under wet conditions with the use of specially tanned leathers. But it was soon discovered that Skirrow never created any of the technologies and instead they were invented by people in the background.

Nomis transitioned to the European market rather dismally in 2009 after taking a large portion of Australia's four football codes boot sales in previous years. Due to the lack of progress and publicity in Europe, Nomis decided to restructure as Pele football, they now have a decent share in the European market, gain far better publicity and still introduce new models in Australasia under Nomis.

Football superstar Harry Kewell used Nomis after turning down multimillion-dollar offers from Adidas, Nike and Reebok.

Nomis AG did go bankrupt in 2010 due to a dispute between the shareholders. They are no longer using the leather technology acknowledged by him to have been invented by others and shown to him in a chance meeting one afternoon.

They did add a variety of price points to enable the brand to be utilized by the whole market. They are offering the classic, Glove style as well as the Spark, a lightweight style and the entry-priced Instinct at Rebel. Due to untimely delays in production, the shoes missed the core soccer and football season, so the launch was delayed. Rebel has decided to continue with Nomis as a house brand (exclusive to them in Australia) and will produce Nomis for at least one more year in a new factory in China.

The products were being produced in a factory in China that makes mid-range to top-range-level brands, although yet again this would now seem to have come to an end. The principals of Nomis and the factory have mutually decided to part ways, after a difficult start in the first two seasons. The previous factory has made for Diadora, Lotto, Patrick, Umbro, Penalty, and Admiral.

The brand is doing well in some markets through closeouts and some newer unique styles. It will continue in North America, under new management and will offer factory direct to clubs/players distribution, which can be utilized as a fund raiser for soccer clubs. The brand is still being worn by top level athletes in various sports including, rugby league, AFL, Rugby Union, and Football professionals.

== Sponsorships ==
Nomis is the official supplier and sponsor of numerous sport association teams, players and associations, including:

=== Teams ===
==== Africa ====
- (Cameroon) Coton Sport FC de Garoua (until 2013–2014 season)
- (Nigeria) Warri Wolves F.C. (until 2013–2014 season)
