= Shelley Kerr =

Scottish footballer and football manager

Shelley Kerr MBE
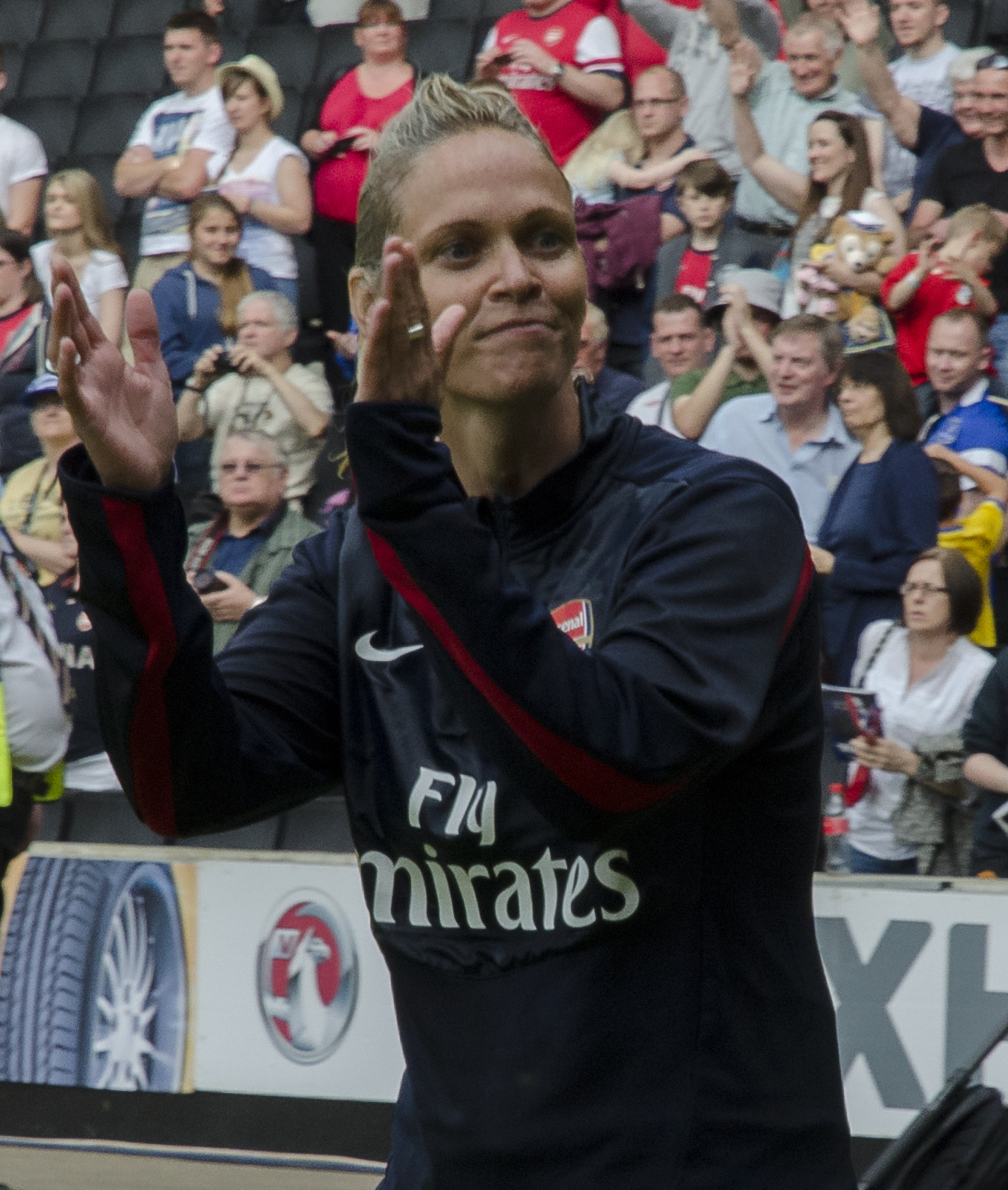
- Kerr with Arsenal in 2014

Personal information
- Full name: Michelle Kerr
- Date of birth: 15 October 1969 (age 57)
- Place of birth: Broxburn, Scotland
- Height: 1.72 m (5 ft 8 in)
- Position: Defender

Team information
- Current team: FA women's national teams technical lead

Senior career*
Years	Team	Apps	(Gls)
- Edinburgh Dynamo
- Inveralmond Thistle
- Heart of Midlothian
2001–2002	Giuliano's		
2002–2005	Kilmarnock		
2005–2007	Doncaster Rovers Belles		
2007–2008	Hibernian		
2008–2010	Spartans		

International career^{‡}
1989–2008	Scotland	59	(3)

Managerial career
- 2004: Kilmarnock
- 2007–2008: Hibernian
- 2008–2010: Spartans
- 2009–2013: Scotland U19
- 2013–2014: Arsenal
- 2014–2017: Stirling University F.C.
- 2017–2020: Scotland
- * Club domestic league appearances and goals ‡ National team caps and goals as of 10:40, 17 December 2017 (UTC)

Michelle Kerr MBE (born 15 October 1969) is a Scottish football manager and former player who is currently the English Football Association's technical lead for women's national teams. As a player Kerr was a powerful centre back, who captained and managed Scotland as well as clubs including Kilmarnock and Hibernian. During her playing career, Kerr won every domestic honour in Scotland and played in the UEFA Women's Cup. She won 59 caps for Scotland between 1989 and 2008, scoring three goals.

As a manager, Kerr gained experience at Kilmarnock, Hibernian and Spartans while progressing through the Scottish Football Association's (SFA) Long-term Player Development pathway, eventually taking charge of the Scotland women's under-19 national team in 2009. She gained the UEFA Pro Licence in January 2013, shortly before leaving the SFA for Arsenal. She led Arsenal to an FA Women's Cup and Continental Cup double in 2013, and a second FA Cup in 2014. After a stint with the Stirling University men's team, Kerr managed the Scotland women's team. She guided Scotland to their first appearance in a Women's World Cup finals, but left after they failed to qualify for the following European Championship.

== Playing career ==
=== Club career ===
Kerr participated in football at school and Edinburgh Dynamo were her first football club. In 2001–02 Kerr was playing for Edinburgh–based Giuliano's. In summer 2002 she moved to league champions Kilmarnock, ahead of the inaugural Scottish Women's Premier League season. In September 2002 Kerr made her UEFA Women's Cup debut in a 0–0 draw with CSK.

In January 2005 Kerr and compatriot Nicky Grant signed for struggling English FA Women's Premier League club Doncaster Rovers Belles, both making their debuts in a 3–1 home defeat by Charlton Athletic. Kerr and Grant scored in the Belles' 2–0 win over Bristol City to help the club avoid relegation.

=== International career ===
Kerr made her senior Scotland debut against the "Auld Enemy" England, a 3–0 friendly defeat at Starks Park, Kirkcaldy in April 1989.

Kerr stopped playing football for around nine years, during which she gave birth to her daughter. Returning to the game in her early thirties, she trained hard to win back her place in the Scotland team. In May 2001, Kerr was named in coach Vera Pauw's Scotland squad for a friendly with the Netherlands at Almondvale Stadium. She was listed as a Heart of Midlothian LFC player.

Following her comeback, Kerr later intended to quit national team duty after a tour of Cyprus in 2007, but was persuaded by coach Anna Signeul to return for the UEFA Women's Euro 2009 qualifying campaign. Prior to the home fixture against Ukraine at McDiarmid Park in May 2008, presentations were made to Kerr, Megan Sneddon and Suzanne Grant who had all reached the milestone of 50 appearances for their country.

Kerr retired from international football, at 39 years old, after the away leg of Scotland's eventual away goals defeat by Russia in Nalchik on 30 October 2008, in the qualifying play-off. It was reported that this had been her 58th and final cap. In an interview with She Kicks in May 2010, Kerr attested to a total of 59 appearances. As of 2019, she held Scottish national records for the oldest player (39 years, 15 days) and the longest span of appearances (19 years, 183 days between first and last caps).

== Coaching career ==
Kerr took her first coaching course at the Inverclyde NTSC in 1989. When Jim Chapman resigned as manager of Kilmarnock Ladies in 2004, Kerr took the team's training sessions in the opening months of the 2004–05 season. She did not want the job on a permanent basis and was keen for someone else to take over. After Kerr's playing career took her to Doncaster Rovers Belles, then back to Scotland with Hibernian, she took over as Hibs' player–coach under manager Maggie Wilson in 2007–08. That season she captained the club to a Scottish Women's Cup and Scottish Women's Premier League Cup double.

In June 2008 Kerr left Hibernian for a player–manager role at their Edinburgh rivals Spartans. Having previously worked as a Regional Development Officer for the Scottish Football Association (SFA), Kerr was appointed Technical and Development Programme Manager for Girls and Women's Football in 2009. The women's under–19 national team came under Kerr's remit and she steered them to the 2010 UEFA Women's Under-19 Championship finals. Increasing commitments with the SFA meant that Kerr resigned as Spartans manager in April 2010.

Kerr was awarded the UEFA Pro Licence in January 2013. On 1 February 2013 she was "extremely excited" to be announced as Laura Harvey's successor as manager of Arsenal Ladies. The club under her management won the FA Women's Cup and Continental Cup and finished third in the league during the 2013 season. After a poor run of form which saw the club gain only one point from the opening four league matches of the 2014 season, exit the Champions League to Birmingham and suffer a shock loss to Reading in the League Cup, Kerr decided to resign. Kerr's final game in charge of Arsenal was the 2014 FA Women's Cup final which her team won 2–0 against Everton.

On 19 August 2014 Kerr was appointed as manager of the Lowland Football League team Stirling University. Kerr's appointment was the first time at that level in the United Kingdom a woman has been named as manager of a men's club. She led the team to consistent top five league finishes and the British Universities Championship final in 2014–15, but lost 1–0 to Hartpury University. Kerr also established an under 20 programme as a pathway to the full team for players in her time in charge.

On 3 April 2017, Kerr was appointed the head coach of the Scotland women's national team. Under her management, Scotland qualified for the 2019 FIFA Women's World Cup. Kerr left the position by mutual consent in December 2020, after the team failed to qualify for UEFA Women's Euro 2021.

== Style of play ==
Anna Signeul, Kerr's manager at international level, described her as a "really British central defender" in respect of "toughness on the pitch, and for her ability to communicate verbally and direct the other players." In 2002, journalist Moira Gordon praised Kerr as "uncompromising and tenacious" and "a tough player both mentally and physically, she is good in the air and also with the ball at her feet, and times her tackles well."

== Career statistics ==
=== International goals ===
Results list Scotland's goal tally first.

#	Date	Venue	Opponent	Result	Competition	Scored
1	25 November 2001	Puyenbeke Stadion, Belsele	Belgium	2–3	2003 FIFA Women's World Cup qual.	1
2	31 July 2005	McDiarmid Park, Perth	Northern Ireland	2–1	Friendly	1
3	27 October 2007	NTC Senec, Senec	Slovakia	3–0	2009 UEFA Women's Championship qual.	1

=== Managerial record ===
Team	From	To	Record					
Team	From	To	G	W	D	L	Win %	Ref.
Scotland	1 June 2017	24 December 2020	21	13	2	6	61.90	

== Honours ==
- Appointed Member of the Order of the British Empire (MBE) in the 2019 Birthday Honours for services to football.
- Honorary degree from the University of Stirling.

=== Player ===
Hibernian

- Scottish Women's Premier League: 2007
- Scottish Cup: 2007, 2008

=== Manager ===
Arsenal

- FA Women's Cup: 2013, 2014
- FA WSL Cup: 2013

Stirling University

- Queen's Park Shield: 2016–17

Scotland Women

- The Pinatar Cup: 2020
