= Anna Signeul =

Swedish footballer and manager

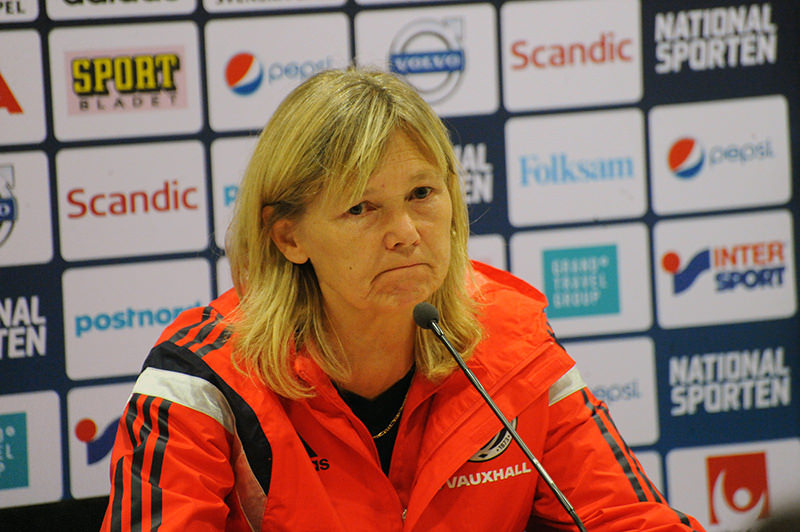

Personal information
- Date of birth: 20 May 1961 (age 65)
- Place of birth: Falun, Sweden
- Position: Midfielder

Senior career*
Years	Team	Apps	(Gls)
1972–1978	Falu BS		
1979–1981	Sundborns GoIF		
1980–1984	IK Brage		
1984–1992	Strömsbro IF		

Managerial career
- 1981–1983: IK Brage
- 1984–1986: Strömsbro IF
- 1987–1989: IK Sätra
- 1993–1994: Strömsbro IF
- 1996–1998: Tyresö FF
- 1996–2004: Sweden U16/U18
- 2005–2017: Scotland
- 2017–2022: Finland
- * Club domestic league appearances and goals

Anna Signeul (born 20 May 1961) is a Swedish football manager and former football player. She was the national coach of the Scotland women's team from March 2005 until 2017, and the national coach of the Finland women's team from 2017 to 2022.

== Playing career ==
Signeul grew up in the town of Falun, Sweden and enjoyed participating in many sports as a child. As a supporter of IFK Göteborg, she drifted towards football and joined local club Falu BS. While still a teenager, she joined IK Brage before spending the majority of her playing career at Strömsbro IF. In total, Signeul made 240 appearances in the Division 1 and Damallsvenskan, the highest tiers of Swedish women's football. Although called up to several Sweden national squads, she was never capped for her country as a player.

== Coaching career ==
Signeul began her coaching career at the age of 21 while still a player at IK Brage. She coached at club level including spells at Strömsbro IF and Tyresö FF, and from 1996 worked with the Swedish Football Association as head of the national women's teams at youth level. Under Signeul's tutelage, Sweden came third in the 1998 UEFA Women's Under-18 Championship before winning the competition the following year.

In March 2005, Signeul was appointed as national coach of the Scotland women's team, replacing the outgoing Vera Pauw. Her first major achievement was leading the country to a qualification play-off for UEFA Women's Euro 2009 which they lost on away goals to Russia. She has also led Scotland to an all-time high of 20 in the FIFA Women's World Rankings. In addition to her position as National Coach, Signeul also has a wider remit in charge of developing the women's game at all levels in Scotland. Signeul announced in January 2017 that she would leave Scotland after the UEFA Women's Euro 2017 tournament to become the head coach of Finland.

After the end of the UEFA Women's Euro 2022 tournament, concluded by Finland at the group stage and defeated in all the three matches, Signeul resigned in agreement with the Football Association of Finland.
