= Michelle Barr =

Scottish footballer and coach (born 1978)

Shelley Barr
Personal information
- Full name: Michelle Barr
- Date of birth: 19 October 1978 (age 48)
- Place of birth: Lanark, Scotland
- Position: Central defender

Senior career*
Years	Team	Apps	(Gls)
- Cumbernauld Ladies
1999	Miami Gliders		
2000–2001	Stenhousemuir		
2001–2004	ÍBV		
2001–2002	Doncaster Belles		
2002–2003	Kilmarnock Ladies		
2003–2004	Doncaster Belles		
2004–2005	Leeds United		
2005	Vermont Lady Voltage		
2007	Boston Renegades		
2011–2012	Celtic		
2013–2014	Rangers		

International career^{‡}
1996–2005	Scotland	87	(1)

Managerial career
- 2014–: Old Dominion Monarchs
- * Club domestic league appearances and goals as of 15:30, 20 March 2013 (UTC) ‡ National team caps and goals as of 15:30, 20 March 2013 (UTC)

Michelle Barr (born 19 October 1978) is a Scottish football coach and former player who is the head coach of Old Dominion Monarchs college soccer team. She formerly played in the Scottish Women's Premier League for both Celtic and Rangers. She has previously played professionally in the Icelandic Úrvalsdeild and has been capped for the Scotland women's national team on 87 occasions.

== Career ==
In 1999, Barr won the first Scottish Sports Aid Foundation award for women's football, £500.

As a player, she has won every domestic honour in the Scottish women's game and was a runner-up in the English FA Women's Cup Final in 2002 with Doncaster Belles.

Barr made her debut for the Scotland women's national team in 1996 against the Republic of Ireland and went on to win 87 caps, scoring once.

She played professionally in Iceland for ÍBV between 2001 and 2004, becoming club captain.

She joined the coaching staff at Dartmouth College as a volunteer assistant in 2005, becoming assistant coach to Angie Hind the following season. Barr and Hind both left Dartmouth in December 2010.

Barr was employed by the Scottish Football Association as National Youth Support Programme Manager for Girls/Women's football and is also assistant coach of the national Under-15 Girls team.

She joined Rangers for the 2013 Scottish Women's Premier League season. In May 2014 she became head coach of the Old Dominion Monarchs, based in Norfolk, Virginia.
