= Gemma Fay =

Scottish footballer (born 1981)

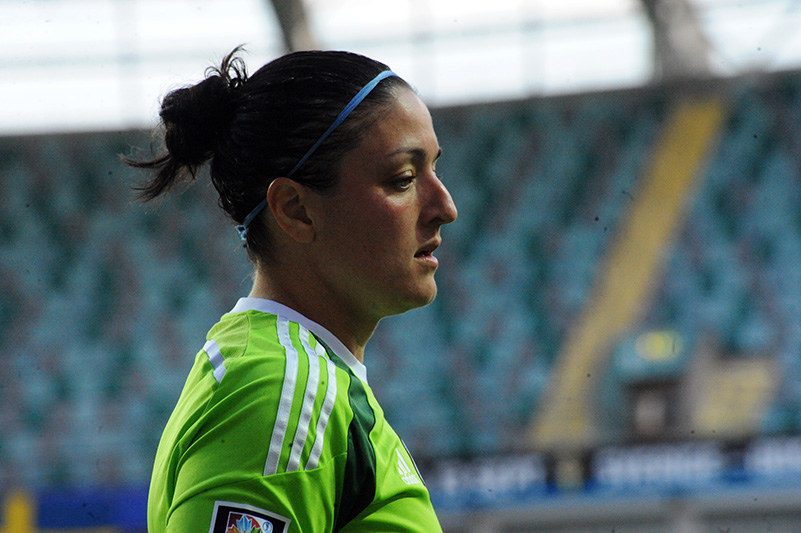
- Fay with Scotland in September 2014

Personal information
- Full name: Gemma Fay
- Date of birth: 9 December 1981 (age 44)
- Place of birth: Perth, Scotland
- Position: Goalkeeper

Youth career
- St Johnstone

Senior career*
Years	Team	Apps	(Gls)
- Aberdeen
–2002	Ayr United		
2002–2003	Brighton & Hove Albion		
2003–2005	Hibernian		
2005–2007	Leeds United		
2007–2009	Hibernian		
2009–2016	Celtic	50+	(0)
2016–2017	Glasgow City		
2017	Stjarnan	15	(0)

International career
1998–2017	Scotland	203	(0)
- * Club domestic league appearances and goals

Gemma Fay (born 9 December 1981) is a Scottish former female international football goalkeeper and actress. She last played in Iceland for Stjarnan. Fay made 203 appearances for the Scotland national team, becoming their most capped player.

== Career ==
Fay made her senior Scotland debut against Czech Republic in May 1998 and Fay won 23 Scotland caps before the age of 19. She praised the contribution of her national goalkeeping coach, Jim Gallacher.

In 2009, Fay took over the captain's armband from long-term skipper Julie Fleeting and then reached 100 caps against Canada at the Cyprus Cup in 2009. In December 2011 Fay and three Celtic women's team mates were approached about playing for Team GB at the 2012 Olympics.

Fay moved on to 141 appearances in May 2012, equalling the record held by Pauline Hamill, after playing in a 3–1 friendly win over Poland in Gdańsk. She set a new record of 142 appearances after playing in Scotland's next match, a 4–1 friendly defeat to Sweden.

Fay lost her place in the Glasgow City team in 2017 to Lee Alexander. In an effort to prolong her international career, Fay moved to Icelandic club Stjarnan in April 2017. She made her 200th full international appearance in July 2017, in a friendly against Ireland.

Fay retired from football following the UEFA Women's Euro 2017 tournament, with 203 caps for Scotland, making her the most capped of all time.

In November 2017, Fay was appointed as Scottish Rugby's new Head of Women and Girls' rugby.

Fay was part of the BBC's coverage of the 2019 FIFA Women's World Cup.

== Acting ==
In 2013, Fay made her acting debut in the one-off Sky Living drama Rubenesque.

== See also ==
- List of women's footballers with 100 or more caps
- Scottish FA Women's International Roll of Honour
