= Scotland women's national football team =

Women's national association football team representing Scotland

Scotland
- Association: Scottish Football Association
- Confederation: UEFA (Europe)
- Head coach: Melissa Andreatta
- Captain: Caroline Weir
- Most caps: Gemma Fay (203)
- Top scorer: Julie Fleeting (116)
- Home stadium: Hampden Park
- FIFA code: SCO
First colours	Second colours

FIFA ranking
- Current: 23 ▲2 (20 October 2026)
- Highest: 19 (March 2014; September 2018)
- Lowest: 31 (March – June 2004)

First international
- Scotland 2–3 England (Greenock, Scotland; 18 November 1972)

Biggest win
- Scotland 17–0 Lithuania (Glasgow, Scotland; 30 May 1998)

Biggest defeat
- England 8–0 Scotland (Nuneaton, England; 23 June 1973); Spain 8–0 Scotland (Seville, Spain; 30 November 2021)

World Cup
- Appearances: 1 (first in 2019)
- Best result: Group stage (2019)

European Championship
- Appearances: 1 (first in 2017)
- Best result: Group stage (2017)
- Website: Official website

The Scotland women's national football team represents Scotland in international women's football competitions. Since 1998, the team has been governed by the Scottish Football Association (SFA). Scotland qualified for the FIFA Women's World Cup for the first time in 2019, and for their first UEFA Women's Championship in 2017. As of June 2025, the team was placed 24th in the FIFA Women's World Rankings, their highest ranking being 19th in March 2014 and September 2018 respectively.

Although most national football teams represent a sovereign state, as a member of the United Kingdom's Home Nations, Scotland is permitted by FIFA statutes to maintain its own national side that competes in all major tournaments, with the exception of the Women's Olympic Football Tournament. Scotland is scheduled to co–host the 2035 FIFA Women's World Cup and gained automatic qualification to the tournament as a result being co–hosts.

== History ==
Church documents recorded women playing football in Carstairs, Lanarkshire, in 1628. Scotland first played a women's international match in May 1881. Women's football struggled for recognition during this early period and was banned by the football authorities in 1921. Club sides who were interested in using their grounds for women's football were subsequently denied permission by the Scottish Football Association (SFA). The sport continued on an unofficial basis until the 1970s, when the ban was lifted. In 1971 UEFA instructed its members to take control of women's football within their territories. The motion was passed 31–1, but Scotland was the only member to vote against it. Football in Scotland has traditionally been seen as a working class and male preserve.

Scotland's first official match, a 3–2 defeat to England, took place in November 1972. The team was managed by Rab Stewart. The 1921 ban on women's football was lifted in 1974, and the SFA assumed direct responsibility for Scottish women's football in 1998. Scotland have participated in most international competitions since the ban was removed. The team reached an all-time high of 19th place in the FIFA Women's World Rankings in March 2014. They reached their first major tournament finals when they qualified for UEFA Women's Euro 2017.

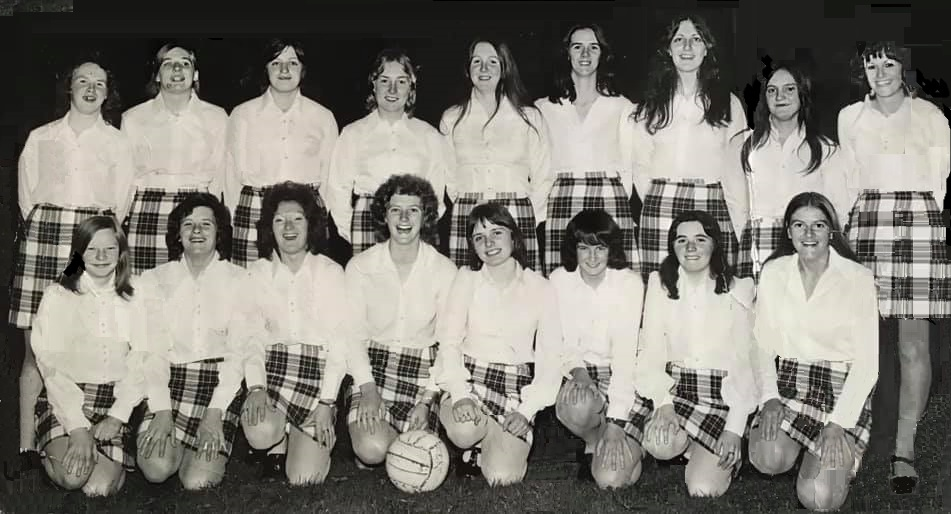
Scotland before a match with Italy at the San Siro in September 1974

The team followed this up by qualifying for their first World Cup finals tournament in 2019. Following their qualification, the Scottish Government announced they would provide funding to allow all the players to train full-time in the lead up to the World Cup, a welcome announcement as several players do not play professionally. Their final home match (against Jamaica) before the 2019 World Cup saw a record attendance for the national team of 18,555. Claire Emslie scored Scotland's first World Cup goal, netting in a 2–1 defeat against England on 9 June. After losing their second game, 2–1 against Japan, Scotland needed to win their third game against Argentina to qualify for the last 16 as a third-placed team. They appeared to be heading for qualification when they took a 3–0 lead, but they conceded three late goals to draw 3–3 and exited at the group stage.

Three consecutive 1–0 defeats in qualification (two by Finland and one by Portugal) prevented Scotland from qualifying for UEFA Women's Euro 2022. Head coach Shelley Kerr, who had guided the team to their appearance at the 2019 World Cup, left her position following this failure.

Pedro Martínez Losa was appointed manager in July 2021, ahead of the first 2023 World Cup qualifiers. The team failed to qualify for the 2023 World Cup, losing a playoff final to the Republic of Ireland.

In December 2022 the players, led by team captain Rachel Corsie, instigated a complaint regarding gender inequality of pay and treatment by the SFA. Although the players are not employed directly by the SFA, they are paid out of a "player appearance pot". The case was settled in September 2023, before an employment tribunal was due to start its proceedings.

== Home stadium ==
The first official match played by the Scotland women's team was hosted by the Ravenscraig Stadium, an athletics facility in Greenock. Until 2020 the team normally played its home games at (men's) club stadiums around the country. Venues used included Fir Park in Motherwell, Tynecastle Park and Easter Road in Edinburgh, and St Mirren Park in Paisley.

Hampden Park in Glasgow is the traditional home of the men's national team and is described by the Scottish Football Association as the National Stadium. A Scotland women's international was played at Hampden for the first time in October 2012, when it hosted the first leg of a European Championship qualifying playoff against Spain. Earlier in 2012, Hampden had hosted matches in the Olympic women's football tournament. In May 2019 the team attracted a record attendance for a women's football match in Scotland, when 18,555 were present at Hampden for a World Cup warm-up friendly with Jamaica.

In July 2021 the SFA announced that all of the 2023 FIFA Women's World Cup qualification home matches would be played at Hampden, making it the regular home ground.

== Media coverage ==
Scotland women's internationals have been televised by BBC Alba and broadcast by BBC Radio Scotland. BBC Radio Scotland presenter Tam Cowan was temporarily taken off the air in 2013, after he criticised the use of Fir Park for women's internationals in his Daily Record column. In a November 2013 interview with The Independent newspaper, Laura Montgomery of Glasgow City FC suggested that media coverage of women's football in Scotland often reflected sexist and misogynist attitudes. This is due to a preponderance of "stupid male journalists", according to Montgomery.

== Results and fixtures ==
The following is a list of match results in the last 12 months, as well as any future matches that have been scheduled.

Legend

Win Draw Loss Fixture

=== 2025 ===
28 November ShePlays Tournament	Ukraine	1–1	Scotland	Jerez de la Frontera, Spain
12:00 UTC+1	Kravchuk 38'	Report	McAneny 90+6'	Stadium: Estadio Municipal de Chapín; Referee: Gabriela Arce (Paraguay)

2 December ShePlays Tournament	Scotland	3–2	China	Jerez de la Frontera, Spain
19:00 UTC+1				Stadium: Estadio Municipal de Chapín

=== 2026 ===
3 March World Cup 2027 qualifying	Luxembourg	0–5	Scotland	Esch-sur-Alzette
19:30 UTC+1		Report	Weir 9', 37', 61'; Clark 27'; McGovern 88'	Stadium: Stade Émile Mayrisch; Attendance: 688; Referee: Kristina Georgieva (Bulgaria)

7 March World Cup 2027 qualifying	Scotland	7–0	Luxembourg	Glasgow
17:00	McGovern 1', 31'; Clark 10', 55'; Davidson 78'; Lawton 89'; McAneny 90+4'	Report		Stadium: Hampden Park; Attendance: 4,266; Referee: Nanna Løf Andersen (Denmark)

14 April World Cup 2027 qualifying	Scotland	1–1	Belgium	Edinburgh
	McGovern 90+5'	Report	Kees 15'	Stadium: Easter Road; Attendance: 4,522; Referee: Lotta Vuorio

18 April World Cup 2027 qualifying	Belgium	0–0	Scotland	Leuven
		Report		Stadium: Den Dreef; Attendance: 4,052; Referee: Reka Molnar

5 June World Cup 2027 qualifying	Scotland	6–0	Israel	Budapest
	Cuthbert 17'; Weir 20', 57', 67' (pen.); Davidson 81'; Hanson 86'	Report		Stadium: Bozsik Aréna; Attendance: None; Referee: Déborah Anex (Switzerland)

9 June World Cup 2027 qualifying	Israel	1–5	Scotland	Budapest (Note: Due to the Gaza war, Israel were required to play their home matches at a neutral venue.)
	Kats 56'	Report	Weir 16', 70' (pen.), 79', 90'; Clark 37'	Stadium: Bozsik Aréna; Attendance: None; Referee: Karoline Marie Jensen (Norway)

9 October World Cup 2027 play-offs	Czech Republic	0–2	Scotland	Pardubice
		Report	Weir 57'; Emslie 65'	Stadium: Stadion Arnošta Košťála

13 October World Cup 2027 play-offs	Scotland	3–2 (5–2 agg.)	Czech Republic	Paisley
20:15 (19:15 UTC+1)	Davidson 5'; McGovern 49'; Grimshaw 72'	Report (FIFA); Report (UEFA)	Veselá 3'; Cahynová 33'	Stadium: St Mirren Park; Referee: Maria Sole Ferrieri Caputi (Italy)

November World Cup 2027 play-offs	Scotland	v	Sweden

December World Cup 2027 play-offs	Sweden	v	Scotland

== Coaching staff ==
=== Current staff ===
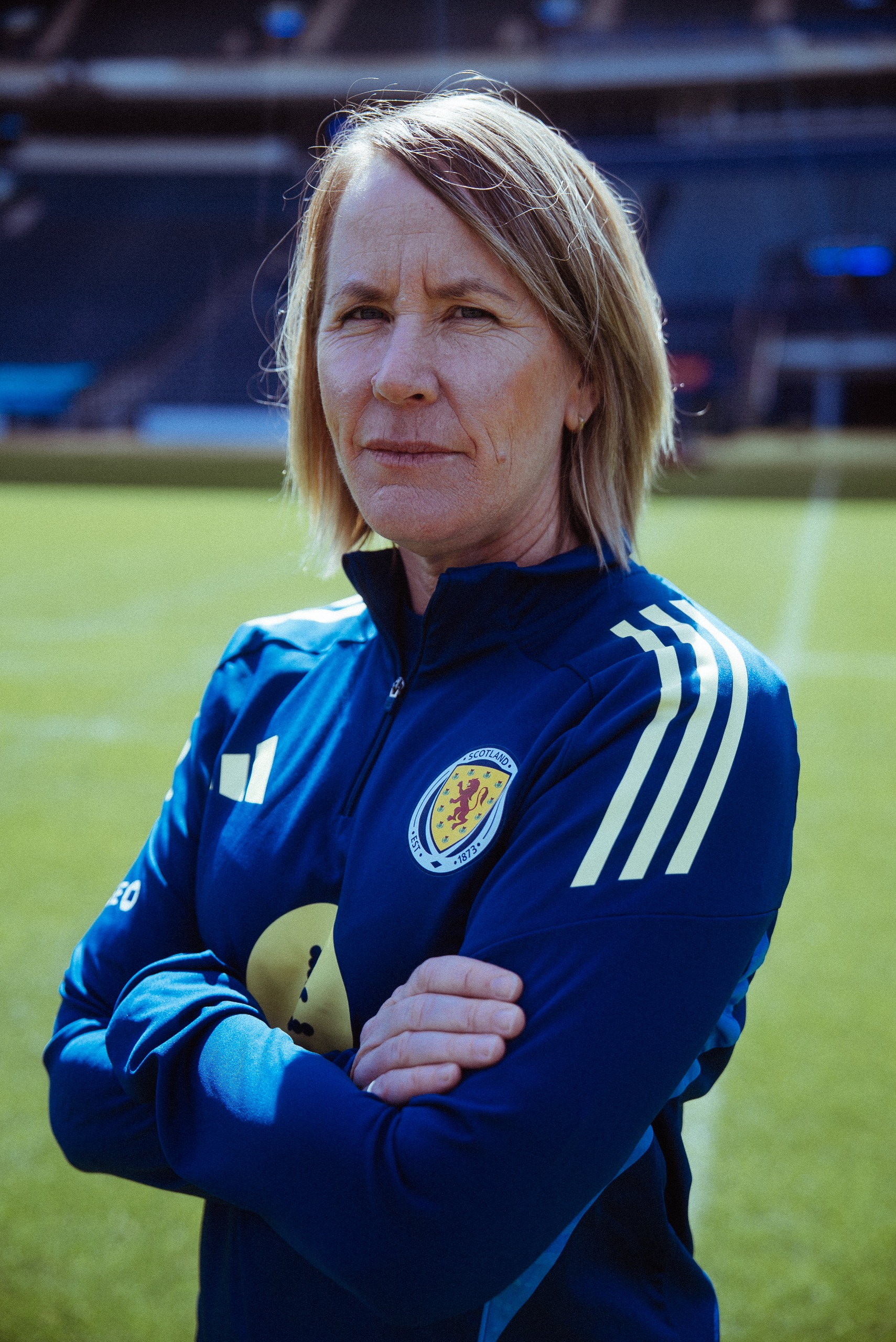
Current coach; Melissa Andreatta (2025–)

As of 9 April 2025

Position	Staff
Head coach	Melissa Andreatta
Assistant coaches	Stuart Glennie; Leanne Ross
Goalkeeper coach	Fraser Stewart

=== Head coaches ===
Name	Tenure	Refs
(Scotland) Rab Stewart	1972–1974	
(Scotland) Elsie Cook	1974	
(Scotland) John Pollatschek	1979–1985	
(Scotland) Margaret McGough	1989	
(Scotland) Jim Fleeting	1998	
(Netherlands) Vera Pauw	1998–2004	
(Sweden) Anna Signeul	2005–2017	
(Scotland) Shelley Kerr	2017–2020	
(Australia) Stuart McLaren (interim)	2021	
(Spain) Pedro Martínez Losa	2021–2024	
(Scotland) Michael McArdle (interim)	2025	
(Australia) Melissa Andreatta	2025–	

== Players ==
=== Current squad ===
The following players were called up for the 2027 FIFA Women's World Cup qualification playoff matches against Sweden on 1 and 5 December 2026.

Caps and goals correct as of 14 October 2026, after the second match against Czech Republic.

No.	Pos.	Player	Date of birth (age)	Caps	Goals	Club
	GK	Lee Gibson	23 September 1991 (age 35)	65	0	(Scottish Football Association) Glasgow City
	GK	Sandy MacIver	18 June 1998 (age 28)	14	0	(United States Soccer Federation) Washington Spirit
	GK	Eartha Cumings	11 June 1999 (age 27)	8	0	(The Football Association) Manchester City
	DF	Nicola Docherty	23 August 1992 (age 34)	75	2	(Scottish Football Association) Rangers
	DF	Sophie Howard	17 September 1993 (age 33)	67	4	(Italian Football Federation) Como
	DF	Rachel McLauchlan	7 July 1997 (age 29)	39	0	(The Football Association) Newcastle United
	DF	Jenna Clark	29 September 2001 (age 25)	36	5	(The Football Association) Liverpool
	DF	Amy Muir	7 March 2000 (age 26)	16	0	(Scottish Football Association) Glasgow City
	DF	Emma Lawton	26 July 2001 (age 25)	14	2	(The Football Association) Ipswich Town
	DF	Georgia Brown	31 August 2002 (age 24)	3	0	(United States Soccer Federation) Sporting Club Jacksonville
	MF	Erin Cuthbert	19 July 1998 (age 28)	89	25	(The Football Association) Chelsea
	MF	Samantha Kerr	17 April 1999 (age 27)	34	1	(The Football Association) Liverpool
	MF	Chelsea Cornet	24 November 1998 (age 27)	19	1	(The Football Association) Birmingham City
	MF	Kirsty Maclean	12 April 2005 (age 21)	19	0	(The Football Association) Liverpool
	MF	Christy Grimshaw	8 November 1995 (age 31)	18	3	(Italian Football Federation) Milan
	MF	Miri Taylor	2 February 2000 (age 26)	9	0	(The Football Association) Aston Villa
	MF	Maria McAneny	25 June 2004 (age 22)	4	2	(Scottish Football Association) Celtic
	MF	Beth Lumsden	26 July 1999 (age 27)	0	0	(The Football Association) Newcastle United
	FW	Claire Emslie	8 March 1994 (age 32)	77	17	(United States Soccer Federation) Angel City
	FW	Martha Thomas	31 May 1996 (age 30)	54	21	(The Football Association) Newcastle United
	FW	Kirsty Hanson	17 April 1998 (age 28)	50	6	(The Football Association) Tottenham Hotspur
	FW	Lauren Davidson	1 October 2001 (age 25)	34	4	(Norwegian Football Federation) Brann
	FW	Kathleen McGovern	27 June 2002 (age 24)	12	7	(The Football Association) Newcastle United
	FW	Freya Gregory	12 January 2003 (age 23)	11	0	(The Football Association) Newcastle United
	FW	Kirsty Howat	19 May 1997 (age 29)	9	2	(The Football Association) Crystal Palace
	FW	Eilidh Adams	6 April 2004 (age 22)	4	0	(The Football Association) Ipswich Town

=== Recent call-ups ===
The following players have also been called up to the squad within the past 12 months.

Pos.	Player	Date of birth (age)	Caps	Goals	Club	Latest call-up
DF	Leah Eddie	23 January 2001 (age 25)	6	0	(England) Leicester City	v. Israel, 9 June 2026
DF	Kenzie Weir	14 January 2004 (age 22)	0	0	(England) Ipswich Town	v. Israel, 9 June 2026
DF	Charlotte Newsham	14 May 2000 (age 26)	3	0	(England) Charlton Athletic	v. Belgium, 14 April 2026
DF	Kirsty Smith	6 January 1994 (age 32)	65	0	(Scotland) Rangers	v. Switzerland, 28 October 2025
MF	Caroline Weir	20 June 1995 (age 31)	122	32	(France) OL Lyonnes	v. Czech Republic, 14 October 2026
MF	Jodi McLeary	1 June 2005 (age 21)	0	0	(Scotland) Rangers	v. Belgium, 14 April 2026
MF	Amy Rodgers	4 May 2000 (age 26)	12	0	(Denmark) Brøndby	v. Luxembourg, 3 March 2026
FW	Mia McAulay	16 August 2006 (age 20)	5	0	(England) Aston Villa	v. Czech Republic, 14 October 2026
FW	Laura Berry	11 June 2007 (age 19)	0	0	(Scotland) Rangers	v. Israel, 9 June 2026
Notes: ^{INJ} = Withdrew due to injury

=== Honoured players ===
The SFA operates a roll of honour for every female player who has made more than 50 appearances (initially 100) for Scotland. The Scottish Football Museum operates a hall of fame, based at Hampden Park, which is open to players and managers involved in Scottish football. Rose Reilly (2007) and Julie Fleeting (2018) are the only women to be inducted so far. Sportscotland operates the Scottish Sports Hall of Fame, which has inducted some footballers, also including Reilly.

== Records ==
As of 9 June 2026

Players in bold are still active with the national team.

=== Most capped players ===
Rank	Player	Career	Caps	Goals
1	Gemma Fay	1998–2017	203	0
2	Joanne Love	2002–2019	189	13
3	Rachel Corsie	2009–2025	155	20
4	Jane Ross	2009–2024	151	62
5	Jen Beattie	2008–2022	143	24
6	Kim Little	2007–2021	140	59
7	Leanne Ross	2006–2017	136	9
8	Pauline Hamill	1992–2010	132	29
9	Megan Sneddon	2002–2014	128	4
10	Ifeoma Dieke	2004–2017	123	0

=== Top goalscorers ===
Rank	Player	Career	Goals	Caps	Avg.
1	Julie Fleeting	1996–2015	116	118	0.98
2	Jane Ross	2009–2024	62	151	0.41
3	Kim Little	2007–2021	59	140	0.42
4	**Caroline Weir**	2013–present	31	121	0.26
5	Pauline Hamill	1992–2010	29	132	0.22
6	**Erin Cuthbert**	2016–present	25	87	0.29
7	Jen Beattie	2008–2022	24	143	0.17
8	**Martha Thomas**	2020–present	21	52	0.40
9	Rachel Corsie	2009–2025	20	155	0.17
10	Lisa Evans	2011–2024	17	115	0.15

== Competitive record ==
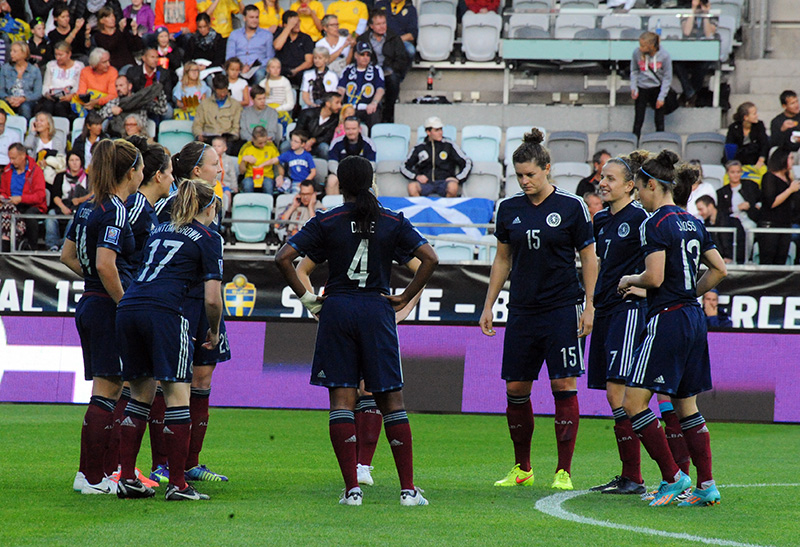
Scotland playing a 2015 World Cup qualifying match in Sweden

=== World Cup ===
Scotland is set to co-host the 2035 FIFA Women's World Cup along with the three other countries in the United Kingdom, earning them automatic qualification as co-host.

Year	Final Tournament							Qualification						
Year	Round	Pld	W	D	L	F	A	Round	Pld	W	D	L	F	A
(China) 1991	Did not enter							Did not enter						
(Sweden) 1995	Did not qualify							Group – 4th (Note: The European Championship acted as a qualification tournament for the World Cup.)	6	0	0	6	3	22
(United States) 1999	Unable to qualify (Note: Scotland were in "Class B" of European qualification and were therefore unable to earn qualification for the World Cup finals.)							Unable to qualify						
(United States) 2003	Unable to qualify							Unable to qualify						
(China) 2007	Did not qualify							Group – 3rd	8	2	2	4	4	20
(Germany) 2011	Did not qualify							Group – 2nd	8	6	1	1	24	5
(Canada) 2015	Did not qualify							Play-offs	12	8	0	4	38	12
(France) 2019	Group – 4th	3	0	1	2	5	7	Group – 1st	8	7	0	1	19	7
(Australia) (New Zealand) 2023	Did not qualify							Play-offs	10	6	1	3	23	14
(Brazil) 2027	To be determined							To be determined						
(Costa Rica) (Jamaica) (Mexico) (United States) 2031	To be determined							To be determined						
(England) (Northern Ireland) (Scotland) (Wales) 2035	Qualified							Qualified as co-host						
Total	2/12	3	0	1	2	5	7	Total	46	26	3	17	99	67

*Draws include knockout matches decided on penalty kicks.

FIFA Women's World Cup history
Year	Round	Date	Opponent	Result	Stadium
(France) 2019	Group stage	9 June	England	L 1–2	Allianz Riviera, Nice
(France) 2019	Group stage	14 June	Japan	L 1–2	Roazhon Park, Rennes
(France) 2019	Group stage	19 June	Argentina	D 3–3	Parc des Princes, Paris

=== Olympic Games ===
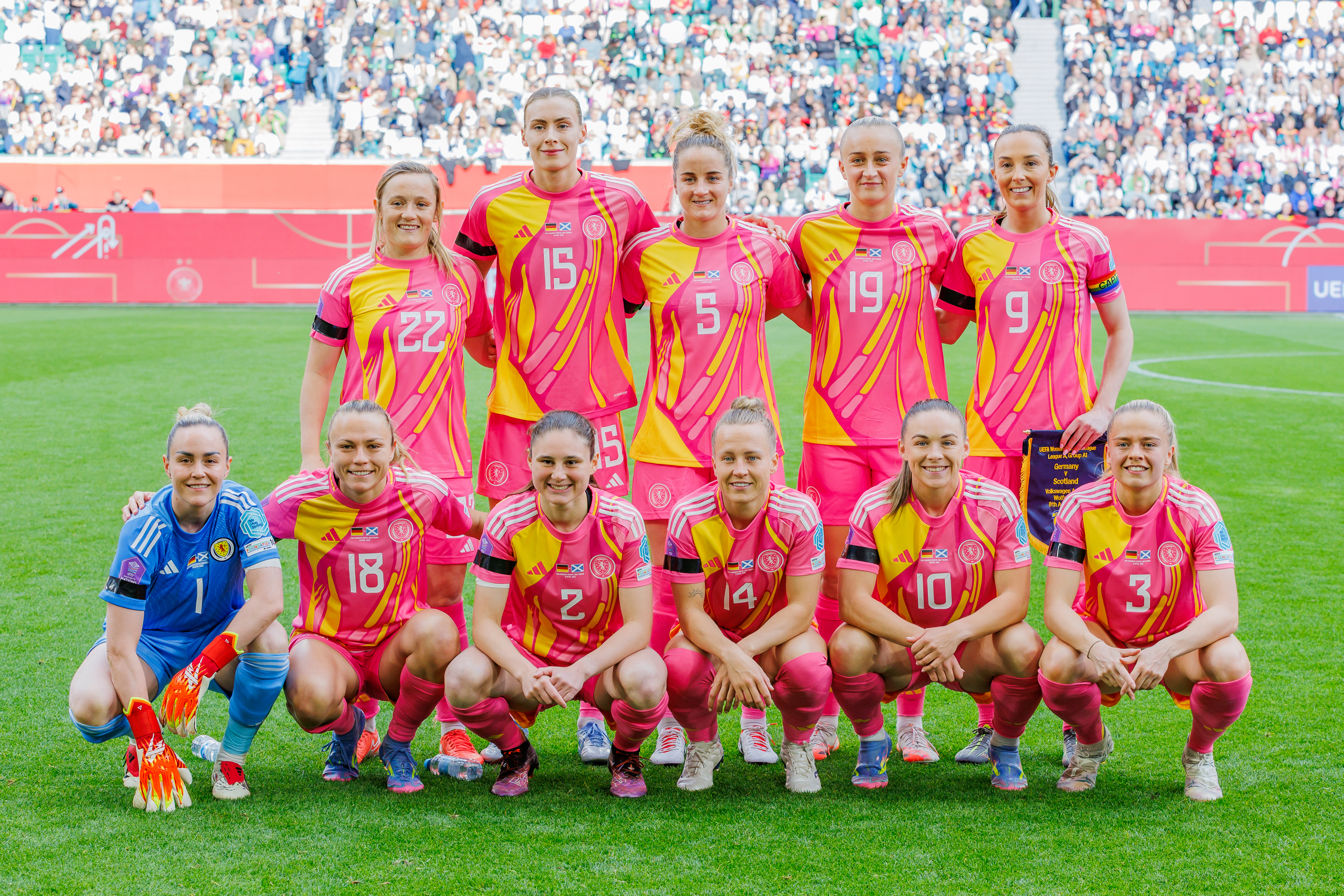
The 2025 squad lining up before a game against Germany, April 2025

At the Olympic Games the International Olympic Committee charter only permit a Great Britain team, representing the whole of the United Kingdom, to compete. As London hosted the 2012 Summer Olympics, a Great Britain team was entered and two Scotland players (Kim Little and Ifeoma Dieke) were selected for the squad.

The FA indicated in June 2013 that they would be prepared to run women's teams at future Olympic tournaments, subject to one of the home nations meeting the qualification criteria (i.e. being one of the top three European nations at the Women's World Cup). Following objections from the Scottish, Welsh and Northern Irish football associations, and a commitment from FIFA that they would not allow entry of a British team unless all four Home Nations agreed, the FA said they would not seek entry into the 2016 tournament.

In October 2018, an agreement was reached between the four associations ahead of the 2020 tournament, and qualification was secured by England reaching the semi-finals of the 2019 World Cup; Kim Little and Caroline Weir were the Scottish players selected for the squad.

England's performance in the Nations League determined whether Great Britain would qualify for the 2024 Olympics. England and Scotland were drawn in the same Nations League group, which created a potential conflict of interest for the Scottish players. The teams met in the last game of the group, when a 6–0 win for England was insufficient to keep Olympic qualification hopes alive.

=== European Championship ===
Year	Final Tournament							Qualification								
Year	Round	Pld	W	D	L	F	A	Round	Pld	W	D	L	F	A	P/R	Rnk
1984	Did not qualify							Group – 2nd	6	3	1	2	9	8	–	
(Norway) 1987	Did not qualify							Group – 2nd	6	4	0	2	24	10	–	
(West Germany) 1989	Did not qualify							Group – 4th	Withdrew							
(Denmark) 1991	Did not enter							Did not enter								
(Italy) 1993	Did not qualify							Group – 3rd	4	0	1	3	1	5	–	
1995	Did not qualify							Group – 4th	6	0	0	6	3	22	–	
(Norway) / (Sweden) 1997	Unable to qualify (Note: Scotland were in "Class B" of European qualification and were therefore unable to earn qualification for the European Championship finals.)							Unable to qualify								
(Germany) 2001	Unable to qualify							Unable to qualify								
(England) 2005	Did not qualify							Group – 3rd	8	4	0	4	19		–	
(Finland) 2009	Did not qualify							Play-offs	10	4	1	5	19	11	–	
(Sweden) 2013	Did not qualify							Play-offs	10	5	2	3	24	16	–	
(Netherlands) 2017	Group – 3rd	3	1	0	2	2	8	Group – 2nd	8	7	0	1	30	7	–	
(England) 2022	Did not qualify							Group E	8	4	0	4	26	5	–	
(Switzerland) 2025	Did not qualify							Play-offs	10	7	2	1	18	3	▲ (Note: From Euro 2025 onwards a new qualifying format was introduced, linked to the Women's Nations League where teams are divided into leagues with promotion/relegation between the leagues at the end of each cycle.)	18th
(Germany) 2029	To be determined															
Totals	1/14	3	1	0	2	2	8	Totals	76	38	7	31	173	103	18th	

UEFA Women's Championship history
Year	Round	Date	Opponent	Result	Stadium
(Netherlands) 2017	Group stage	19 July	England	L 0–6	Stadion Galgenwaard, Utrecht
(Netherlands) 2017	Group stage	23 July	Portugal	L 1–2	Sparta Stadion, Rotterdam
(Netherlands) 2017	Group stage	27 July	Spain	W 1–0	De Adelaarshorst, Deventer

=== Nations League ===
When the UEFA Women's Nations League was inaugurated in 2023–24, Scotland were allocated to League A. After the first edition, they were relegated to League B for Women's Euro 2025 qualifying, but secured promotion back to League A for the 2025 edition.

UEFA Women's Nations League record
Season	League	Group	Pld	W	D	L	GF	GA	P/R	Rank
2023–24	A	1	6	0	2	4	3	15	▼	15th
2025	A	1								
Totals			6	0	2	4	3	15	15th	

Draws include knockout matches decided on penalty kicks; correct as of 1 December 2023 after the match against Belgium.

▲	Promoted at end of season
Same position	No movement at end of season
▼	Relegated at end of season
*	Participated in promotion/relegation play-offs

=== Unofficial competitions ===
- World Cup
  - 1970: Did not compete
  - 1971: Did not compete
  - 1978: Did not compete
  - 1981: Did not compete
  - 1984: Did not compete
  - 1987: Did not compete
- European Competition
  - 1969: Did not participate
  - 1979: Group stage

=== Other tournaments ===
Year	Competition	Result	GP	W	D*	L	GS	GA	Ref
(England) 1976	Three Nations Championship	2nd	2	1	0	1	3	6	
(Italy) 1979	European Competition	Group	2	0	1	1	0	2	
(Bulgaria) 1992	Varna Tournament	7th	3	2	0	1	5	2	
(Bulgaria) 1999	Albena Cup	2nd	5	1	3	1	9	7	
(Bulgaria) 2000	Albena Cup	5th	4	2	1	1	10	5	
(Northern Ireland) 2000	Celt Cup	3rd	2	1	0	1	27	1	
(Netherlands) 2000	Veenendaal Tournament	3rd	2	0	1	1	3	5	
(Portugal) 2002	Algarve Cup	10th	4	2	0	2	4	8	
(Italy) 2006	Torneo Regione Molise	3rd	2	0	0	2	0	8	
(Cyprus) 2008	Cyprus Women's Cup	6th	4	1	0	3	5	5	
(Cyprus) 2009	Cyprus Women's Cup	7th	4	1	0	3	2	8	
(Cyprus) 2010	Cyprus Women's Cup	7th	4	1	0	3	3	10	
(Cyprus) 2011	Cyprus Women's Cup	4th	4	1	1	2	2	4	
(Cyprus) 2012	Cyprus Women's Cup	9th	4	2	0	2	6	8	
(Cyprus) 2013	Cyprus Women's Cup	5th	4	2	1	1	7	6	
(Brazil) 2013	Brazilian Invitational	4th	4	0	0	4	4	10	
(Cyprus) 2014	Cyprus Women's Cup	4th	4	2	2	0	10	7	
(Cyprus) 2015	Cyprus Women's Cup	7th	4	2	0	2	7	7	
(Cyprus) 2017	Cyprus Women's Cup	5th	4	2	1	1	6	5	
(Portugal) 2019	Algarve Cup	5th	3	2	0	1	5	2	
(Spain) 2020	Pinatar Cup	1st	3	3	0	0	6	1	
(Spain) 2022	Pinatar Cup	5th	3	1	1	1	3	3	
(Spain) 2023	Pinatar Cup	3rd	3	1	1	1	3	4	
(Spain) 2024	Pinatar Cup	2nd	2	1	1	0	3	1	
Total			80	31	14	35	133	125	

*Draws include knockout matches decided on penalty kicks.

== See also ==
- List of women's national football teams
- Women's association football around the world
- Scotland women's national under-17 football team
- Scottish Women's Premier League
