= 2020 Celtic F.C. Women season =

Football season for Celtic F.C. Women

Celtic F.C.
2021–22 season
- Manager: Fran Alonso
- Stadium: K-Park Training Academy, East Kilbride
- SWPL 1: Null and void
- Scottish Cup: Not contested
- SWPL Cup: Null and void
- Top goalscorer: League: Sarah Ewens; Kelly Clark (1 goal); All: Sarah Ewens (4 goals)
Home colours	Away colours	Third colours

The 2020 season was Celtic Women's 13th season of competitive football. This was their first season as a professional team. This was to be the final season of a summer season format before a switch to a winter season format later in the year for the 2020-21 season.

== COVID-19 impact ==
The 2020 season for Celtic Women was severely disrupted and ultimately voided due to the COVID-19 pandemic in Scotland. The team participated only briefly in domestic competitions before the national shutdown of women's football in March 2020.

Celtic began the year by competing in the 2020 SWPL Cup, completing the group stage fixtures before the suspension of all football activity. In the Scottish Women's Premier League, the club played just one league match, a 2–1 victory over Glasgow City on 21 February 2020, before the season was halted as part of the nationwide suspension of the women's game.

Following several months of inactivity and ongoing public‑health restrictions, Scottish Women's Football declared the entire 2020 season null and void in July 2020, with all results expunged and no league or cup champions named. The decision applied across SWPL 1, SWPL 2, and the Championship structure, with a new winter‑calendar season scheduled to begin in October 2020.

== Scottish Women's Premier League ==
Celtic played Glasgow City in what ultimately turned out to be their only league fixture played this season before the season was declared null and void.

21 February 2020	Celtic	2-1	Glasgow City	East Kilbride
	Ewens 48'; Clark 90+2'	Report	Shine 46'	Stadium: K-Park Training Academy

== Scottish Women's Cup ==
The 2020 Women's Scottish Cup was not held due to the COVID-19 pandemic.

== Scottish Women's Premier League Cup ==
On 24 January 2020 Celtic were drawn in Group A against Glasgow Women, St Johnstone and Spartans. The competition was ultimately declared null and void wit the rest of the Scottish football after the COVID-19 pandemic.

== Group stage ==
=== Group A ===
==== Table ====
Pos	Team	Pld	W	D	L	GF	GA	GD	Pts	Qualification
1	Celtic	3	2	1	0	10	1	+9	7	Quarter-finals
2	Spartans	3	2	0	1	5	6	−1	6	SWPL Plate
3	St Johnstone	3	1	0	2	3	8	−5	3	SWPL Plate
4	Glasgow Women	3	0	1	2	3	6	−3	1	SWPL Plate

Rules for classification: 1) Points; 2) Goal difference; 3) Number of goals scored

=== Matches ===
9 February 2020 Group Stage	Celtic	0-0	Glasgow Women	East Kilbride
14:00 GMT		Report		Stadium: K-Park Training Academy

0-6 Group Stage	St Johnstone	0-6	Celtic	Perth
16:00 GMT		Report	Green 1'; 22' (o.g.); Ewens 51', 75', 90+8'; Donaldson 81'	Stadium: McDiarmid Park

1 March 2020 Group Stage	Spartans	1-4	Celtic	Edinburgh
15:00 GMT	Galbraith 82'	Report	Green 40'; Ewens 73'; McGovern 78'; Giard 88'	Stadium: Ainslie Park
