= Scottish Women's Football Annual Awards =

The Scottish Women's Football Annual Awards is an award ceremony hosted by Scottish Women's Football (SWF), the governing body for women's association football in Scotland. The inaugural award ceremony, sponsored by The Scottish Sun, took place in 2009 at Hampden Park.

The 2018 edition, which was the first since 2013, was sponsored by MG Alba and it was held at the Hilton Glasgow Hotel; the 2019 awards were also held in Glasgow, at the nearby Marriott Hotel. The 2020 season was cancelled due to the COVID-19 pandemic, which also caused the 2021 awards to be a virtual event (presented from Tynecastle Park). The awards returned to the Hilton Glasgow in 2022, and Hampden Park was the venue in 2023 and 2024, sponsored by ScottishPower.

== Scottish Women's Premier League Player of the Year ==
Year	Player	Club	Ref
2009	Alana Marshall	Spartans	
2010	Susan Fairlie	Hamilton Academical	
2011	Emma Lyons	Falkirk	
2012	Natalie Ross	Celtic	
2013	Becky Flaherty	Buchan	
2018	Nicola Docherty	Glasgow City	
2019	Jamie-Lee Napier	Hibernian	
2021	Lisa Robertson	Celtic	
2022	Priscila Chinchilla	Celtic	
2023	Lauren Davidson	Glasgow City	

=== SWPL 2 ===
Year	Player	Club	Ref
2018	Suzanne Mulvey	Motherwell	
2019	Amy Anderson	Hamilton Academical	
2021	Bayley Hutchison	Aberdeen	
2022	Danni McGinley	Dundee United	
2023	Louise Brown	Montrose	

== SWPL Players' Player of the Year ==
The SWPL Players' Player of the Year award was not awarded in 2018 or 2019.

Year	Player	Club	Source
2009	Fiona McNicoll	Forfar Farmington	
2010	Diana Barry	Spartans	
2011	Shannon Lynn	Hibernian	
2012	Jane Ross	Glasgow City	
2013	Megan Sneddon	Rangers	
2014	Denise O'Sullivan (Note: Although the ceremony did not take place in 2014, Denise O'Sullivan was named SWPL Players' Player of the Year.)	Glasgow City	

== Youth Player of the Year ==
Year	Player	Club	Source
2021	Eilidh Adams	Hibernian	
2022	Mia McAulay	Rangers	
2023	Niamh McCulloch	Hamilton Academical	

== International Player of the Year ==
Year	Player	Club	Source
2009	Pauline Hamill	Celtic	
2010	Gemma Fay	Celtic	
2011	Megan Sneddon	Celtic	
2012	Rhonda Jones	Celtic	
2013	Kim Little	Arsenal	
2018	Erin Cuthbert	Chelsea	
2019	Erin Cuthbert	Chelsea	
2021	Caroline Weir	Manchester City	
2022	Erin Cuthbert	Chelsea	
2023	Lee Gibson	Glasgow City	

== SWPL Golden Boot ==
Top goalscorer awards for each division, first awarded in 2017.

=== SWPL1 ===
Year	Player	Club	Goals	Source
2017	Abi Harrison	Hibernian	15	
2018	Abi Harrison	Hibernian	25	
2019	Kirsty Howat	Glasgow City		
2021	Lizzie Arnot	Rangers	16	

=== SWPL2 ===
Year	Player	Club	Goals	Source
2017	Danni McGinley	Jeanfield Swifts / Forfar Farmington	22	
2018	Suzanne Mulvey	Motherwell	21	
2019	Dionne Brown / Lisa Swanson	Hamilton Academical / Kilmarnock		
2021	Bayley Hutchison	Aberdeen	21	

== Head coach / Manager of the Year ==
=== Senior ===
Year	Player	Club	Source
2009	Peter Caulfield	Glasgow City	
2010	Gary Doctor	Celtic	
2011	Eddie Wolecki Black	Glasgow City	
2012	Mark Nisbet	Forfar Farmington	
2013	Willie Kirk	Hibernian	
2018	Grant Scott	Hibernian	
2019	Scott Booth	Glasgow City	
2021	Scott Booth	Glasgow City	
2022	Malky Thomson	Rangers	
2023	Leanne Ross	Glasgow City	

=== Youth ===
Year	Player	Club	Source
2022	Ross Stormonth	Rangers U19	
2023	Samantha Windram	Musselburgh Windsor	

== Team of the Year ==
Year	Club (senior)	Club (youth)	Source
2018	Glasgow City	Celtic U15	
2019	Glasgow City	Musselburgh Windsor U15	
2021	Glasgow City		
2022	Rangers	Millennium Club of Stranraer U13	
2023		Heart of Midlothian U16	

== Others ==
Year	Recipient	Award name	Source
2021	Amy Bulloch (Partick Thistle)	Goal of the Season	
2021	Charlotte Parker-Smith (Heart of Midlothian)	Save of the Season	
2021	Sarah Herd (East Fife)	Lockdown Hero	
2023	Dundee Dryburgh	Sustainable Club of the Year	

== Special awards ==
=== Service to Girls' and Women's Football ===
Year	Player	Source
2018	Walter McGill	
2019	Rose Reilly	
2021	Julie Fleeting	

=== Kat Lindner Award for Outstanding Academic and Athletic Achievement ===
Year	Player	Source
2019	Rachel Corsie	
2021	Kirsten Reilly	
2022	Leanne Crichton	
2023	Charlotte Parker-Smith	

=== Volunteer of the Year ===
Year	Player	Club	Source
2022	Mhari Lindsay	Cumnock	
2023	Laura Duncan	Buckie Ladies	

=== Val McDermid Spirit of SWF ===
Year	Player	Source
2022	Taylor Rattray	
2023	Rachel Corsie	

== Scottish Women's Player of the Month ==
Clubs in every senior SWPL / SWFL division in Scottish football voted for their player of the match. PSL Team Sports sponsored the Player of the Month awards. At the end of the month, the player with the most votes in each division received a branded match football to mark their achievement. The winners also received a £50 voucher from PSL Team Sports for their club. The Player of the Month award winners for season 2013 made up the shortlist for the Divisional Awards at the 2013 SWF Player of the Year Awards.

Season	Month	Division	Player	Team	Ref
2011	March	Premier League	Lesley McMaster	Rangers	
2011	March	First Division	Caitlin O'Hara	Glasgow City LFC Reserves	
2011	March	Second Division North	Dawn Law	SC Bon Accord	
2011	March	Second Division East			
2011	March	Second Division South East			
2011	March	Second Division West	Shireen Lennon	Murieston United FC	
2011	April	Premier League			
2011	April	First Division			
2011	April	Second Division North			
2011	April	Second Division East	Kirsty Reilly	East Fife LFC	
2011	April	Second Division South East			
2011	April	Second Division West	Sam McManus	Winning LFC	
2011	May	Premier League			
2011	May	First Division			
2011	May	Second Division North			
2011	May	Second Division East	Kim Borthwick	Hearts LFC	
2011	May	Second Division South East			
2011	May	Second Division West	Frances Fern	Airdrie United	
2011	June	Premier League			
2011	June	First Division			
2011	June	Second Division North			
2011	June	Second Division East	Helen Lyon	Spartans WFC 'B'	
2011	June	Second Division South East			
2011	June	Second Division West	Julie McSherry	Airdrie United	
2011	August	Premier League	Nicola Goudie	FC Kilmarnock	
2011	August	First Division			
2011	August	Second Division North			
2011	August	Second Division East			
2011	August	Second Division South East			
2011	August	Second Division West			
2011	September	Premier League			
2011	September	First Division	Ainsley Douglas	Celtic Reserves	
2011	September	Second Division North			
2011	September	Second Division East			
2011	September	Second Division South East			
2011	September	Second Division West	Caitlyn Gallacher	Glasgow Girls FC	
2012	April	Premier League	Jade Gallon	Falkirk LFC	
2012	April	First Division	Marie McGuinness,	Queens Park LFC	
2012	April	Second Division North	Kim Guthrie	Aberdeen FCL	
2012	April	Second Division East	Laura-Anne Johnston	Dundee City LFC	
2012	April	Second Division South East	Megan McKeever	Leith Athletic	
2012	April	Second Division West	Pamela Liddell,	Hamilton Academical WFC Reserves	
2012	May	Premier League	Natalie Ross	Celtic	
2012	May	First Division	Lesley Blair	Airdrie United Cosmos	
2012	May	Second Division North	Rachel Sherriffs	Dee Vale	
2012	May	Second Division East	Laura-Anne Johnston	Dundee City LFC	
2012	May	Second Division South East	Karen McConnel	Hibernian LFC 1875	
2012	May	Second Division West	Gemma Alexander	Hamilton Academical WFC Reserves	
2012	June	Premier League	Sam McManus, FC Kilmarnock	FC Kilmarnock	
2012	June	First Division	Clare Docherty	Troon	
2012	June	Second Division North	Becca Centre	Aberdeen FCL Development	
2012	June	Second Division East	Samantha Wylie	East Fife LFC	
2012	June	Second Division South East	no awards given		
2012	June	Second Division West	no awards given		
2012	August	Premier League	Caitlin McGuire	FC Kilmarnock	
2012	August	First Division	Helen Macleod	Kilwinning LFC Development	
2012	August	Second Division North	Chelsey Lownie	Stonehaven	
2012	August	Second Division East	Sarah Gall	Jeanfield Swfits	
2012	August	Second Division South East	Claire Ditchburn	Musselburgh Windsor	
2012	August	Second Division West	Nicola Hardie	Murieston	
2013	March	Premier League	Hayley Cunningham	Rangers	
2013	March	First Division	Jade Lindsay	Queens Park	
2013	March	Second Division North	Lorna Young	Elgin City Girls FC	
2013	March	Second Division East	Chantelle McKay	Tayside LFC	
2013	March	Second Division South East	Corrie Hogg	Hearts LFC	
2013	March	Second Division West	no award given		
2013	April	Premier League	Leigh Skelton	Falkirk LFC	
2013	April	First Division	Sam McManus	Glasgow Girls	
2013	April	Second Division North	Chelsey Lownie	Luthermuir WFC	
2013	April	Second Division East	Pauline Harley	Raith Rovers	
2013	April	Second Division South East	Sarah Murdoch	Seton Ladies	
2013	April	Second Division West	Megan Mcinnes	Kilwinning LFC Development	
2013	May	Premier League	Rebecca Flaherty	Buchan	
2013	May	First Decision	Rebecca Young	Cumbernauld Colts	
2013	May	Second Division North	Jamie Shearer	Kemnay	
2013	May	Second Division East	Stacey McFadyen	Tayside LFC	
2013	May	Second Division South East	Natasha Robbins	Leith Athletic	
2013	May	Second Division West	Nikki Agnew	Stranraer Ladies FC	
2013	June	Premier League	Nicola Davidson	Forfar Farmington	
2013	June	First Division	Rebecca Young	Cumbernauld Colts	
2013	June	Second Division North	Samantha Murison	Luthermuir WFC	
2013	June	Second Division East	Leanne Barrie	East Fife	
2013	June	Second Division South East	Laura Van Krieken	Hutchison Vale	
2013	June	Second Division West	Karen Brodie	Whitburn GFC	
2013	August	Premier League	Emma Lyons	Falkirk LFC	
2013	August	First Division	Elizabeth Anderson	East Fife LFC	
2013	August	Second Division North	Rhianna Law	Aberdeen LFC	
2013	August	Second Division East	Morgan Steedman	Dunferlmine Athletic LFC	
2013	August	Second Division South East	Natasha Robins	Leith Athletic	
2013	August	Second Division West	Nikki Evans	Stranraer Ladies FC	
2013	September	Premier League	Laura Murray	Hibernian LFC	
2013	September	First Division	Trudy Hamilton	East Fife LFC	
2013	September	Second Division North	Judith Davidson	Dee Vale LFC	
2013	September	Second Division East	Nicole McPhee	Falkirk LFC	
2013	September	Second Division South East	Emma Lawler	Leith Athletic	
2013	September	Second Division West	Abby Brennan	Whitburn GFC	

== See also ==
- List of sports awards honoring women
