= 2013 Scottish Women's Premier League Cup =

Tournament details
- Country: Scotland
- Teams: 12

Final positions
- Champions: Glasgow City
- Runners-up: Spartans

Tournament statistics
- Matches played: 11
- Goals scored: 52 (4.73 per match)
- All statistics correct as of 28 October 2022.

The 2013 Scottish Women's Premier League Cup was the 12th edition of the Scottish Women's Premier League Cup, which began in 2002. The competition was to be contested by all 12 teams of the Scottish Women's Premier League (SWPL).

== First round ==
The match between Buchan and Rangers was declared null and void with Buchan being awarded a 3–0 victory.

3 March 2013	Spartans	4–2	Falkirk	Edinburgh
13.00 pm	B. Beveridge 59'; Ewens 61' 96'; E. Jenkins 105'		E. Lyons 32'; K. Kennedy 48'	Stadium: Spartans Community Football Academy

3 March 2013	Aberdeen	3–4	Forfar Farmington	Edinburgh
14.00 pm	Dempster 16' 35' 70'		Small 55'; H. Napier 61'; Scott 80'; Grant 83'	Stadium: Heathryfold Par

3 March 2013	Celtic	10–0	Kilwinning SC Ladies	Glasgow
14.00 pm	Grant 20' 55' 70' 78'; Harrison 25' 35' 88'; Richards 30'; C. Craig 42'; Jones 77'			Stadium: Garscube Sports Complex

3 March 2013	Buchan LFC	1-0	Rangers	Maud
14.00 pm	Hill			Stadium: Maud Leisure Park

== Quarter-finals ==
21 April 2013	Hibernian	3–2	Hamilton Academical	Broxburn
12.00 pm	S. Fairlie 6' 106'; Weir 70'		McCulloch 18'; A. Douglas 78'	Stadium: Albyn Park

21 April 2013	Buchan LFC	1–2	Spartans	Maud
14.00 pm	L. Cruden 36'		V. Silcocks (OG) 9'; K. Reilly 17'	Stadium: Maud Leisure Park

21 April 2013	Forfar Farmington	3–0	Hutchison Vale	Forfar
14.00 pm	C. Heron 24'; H. Napier 28'; A. Godfrey 53'			Stadium: Station Park

21 April 2013	Glasgow City	2–1	Celtic	Glasgow
14.00 pm	Love 38'; Malone 63'		Harrison 79'	Stadium: Petershill Park

== Semi-finals ==
8 May 2013	Hibernian	1–2	Spartans	Alloa
19.30 pm	K. Turner		L. Mason; Ewens	Stadium: Indodrill Stadium

9 May 2013	Forfar Farmington	0–4	Glasgow City	Hill of Beath
19:30			Ross; O'Sullivan	Stadium: Keirs Park

== Final ==
29 May 2013
19:30

Glasgow City	5–0	Spartans
Littlejohn 2' 41' 59'; Lappin 12'; Ross 89' (pen.)

Indodrill Stadium, Alloa

Glasgow City	Spartans

(Scotland) Lee Alexander
(Scotland) Lisa Robertson
(Scotland) Eilish McSorley
(Scotland) Nicola Docherty
(Scotland) Leanne Ross (c)
(Scotland) Danni Pagliarulo
(Scotland) Leanne Crichton
(Scotland) Suzanne Lappin
(Scotland) Suzanne Malone
(Republic of Ireland) Ruesha Littlejohn
(Scotland) Sarah Crilly
Substitutes:
(Scotland) Laura Williamson
(Scotland) Julie Melrose
(Scotland) Jo Love
(Scotland) Cheryl Gallagher
(Scotland) Danica Dalziel
(Scotland) Ciara Barnes
(Scotland) Catlin O'Hara
Head coach:
(Scotland) Eddie Wolecki Black

(Scotland) Rachel Harrison
(Scotland) Claire Crosbie
(Scotland) Louise Mason
(Scotland) Stephanie Briggs
(Scotland) Bobbie Beveridge
(Scotland) Alana Marshall
(Scotland) Louise Paterson (c)
(Scotland) Sarah Ewens
(Scotland) Kirsty McLaughlin
(Scotland) Katie Reilly
(Scotland) Trisha McLaughlin
Substitutes:
(Scotland) Sarah Archibald
(Scotland) Kirsty Hamilton
(Scotland) Elliss Jenkins
(Scotland) Ashley Nicolson
(Scotland) Rebecca Zoltie
(Scotland) Charlene Lessells
(Scotland) Diana Barry
Manager:
(Scotland) Debbi McCulloch
