= 2009 Scottish Women's Premier League Cup =

Tournament details
- Country: Scotland

Final positions
- Champions: Glasgow City
- Runners-up: Hibernian

Tournament statistics
- Matches played: 11
- Goals scored: 59 (5.36 per match)

The 2009 Scottish Women's Premier League Cup was the 8th edition of the Scottish Women's Premier League Cup which began in 2002. It was contested by all 12 teams of the Scottish Women's Premier League (SWPL), with matches played between August and November 2009.

Although linked to the 2009 Scottish Women's Premier League which had only one round of fixtures as the schedule was transitioned from autumn-spring to summer, the SWPL Cup was played in its normal format and in the same dates as in previous seasons, finishing a year after the 2008–09 final; instead it was the next edition which differed significantly, as it remained an early-season competition but was completed in the first half of a calendar year; the 2010 final was played only 6 months after the 2009 final.

== First Round ==
FC Kilmarnock, Forfar Farmington, Dundee United SC and Rangers received byes.

Teams in bold advanced to the quarter-finals.

Home team	Score	Away team
16 August 2009
Spartans	2–3	**Celtic**
Hamilton Academical	4–4 (Note: After extra time; Aberdeen won 6–5 in a penalty shootout.)	**Aberdeen**
Boroughmuir Thistle	0–5	**Glasgow City**
Inverness	0–3	**Hibernian**

== Quarter-finals ==
Teams in bold advanced to the semi-finals.

Home team	Score	Away team
13 September 2009
**Glasgow City**	8–0	Dundee United SC
Aberdeen	0–2	**Hibernian**
**Celtic**	8–0	Boroughmuir Thistle
FC Kilmarnock	0–4	**Rangers**

== Semi-finals ==
Teams in bold advanced to the final.

4 October 2009

Glasgow City	4–2	Celtic

Glasgow Green Football Centre, Glasgow
4 October 2009

Hibernian	5–1	Rangers

== Final ==
Holders Glasgow City retained the trophy; it was their second SWPL Cup overall. They also won the 2009 Scottish Women's Premier League.

7 November 2009

Glasgow City	3–1	Hibernian
Lindner 1'; Malone; Lappin		Jones 90'

Recreation Park, Alloa

**Glasgow City**	**Hibernian**
