= 2020 Scottish Women's Premier League =

19th edition of the top women's football league in Scotland

Scottish Women's Premier League 1
- Season: 2020
- Matches: 4
- Goals: 8 (2 per match)
- Top goalscorer: Megan Bell (2 goals)
- Biggest home win: Rangers 3–0 Heart of Midlothian (23 February 2020)
- Biggest away win: Forfar Farmington 0–1 Motherwell (23 February 2020)
- Highest scoring: Celtic 2–1 Glasgow City (21 February 2020); Rangers 3–0 Heart of Midlothian (23 February 2020)
- All statistics correct as of 23 February 2020. Season declared null and void as a result of the coronavirus pandemic.

The 2020 Scottish Women's Premier League, known as the Scottish Building Society Scottish Women's Premier League for sponsorship reasons, was due to be the 19th season of the Scottish Women's Premier League, the highest division of women's association football in Scotland since its inception in 2002. Glasgow City were the defending champions. Heart of Midlothian joined the SWPL 1 as the promoted club from the 2019 SWPL 2, replacing Stirling University.

The season started on 21 February 2020 and was scheduled to end in November 2020, but was interrupted by the coronavirus pandemic. In July 2020, the 2020 season was declared null and void. A new season started on 18 October 2020 and concluded on 4 July 2021, with the league reverting to a winter season format.

== Teams ==
Locations of teams in the 2020 SWPL 1

Team	Location	Head coach	Home ground	Capacity	2019 position
Celtic	East Kilbride	(Spain) Fran Alonso	K-Park Training Academy	1,000	3rd
Forfar Farmington	Forfar	(Northern Ireland) Ryan McConville	Station Park	6,777	7th
Glasgow City	Glasgow	(Scotland) Scott Booth	Petershill Park	1,000	1st
Heart of Midlothian	Edinburgh	(Scotland) Andy Enwood	Oriam	1,000	1st in SWPL 2
Hibernian	Edinburgh	(Scotland) Dean Gibson	Ainslie Park	3,000	2nd
Motherwell	Motherwell	(Scotland) Eddie Wolecki Black	Ravenscraig Regional Sports Facility	1,000	6th
Rangers	Milngavie	(France) Grégory Vignal	Rangers Training Centre	500	4th
Spartans	Edinburgh	(Scotland) Debbi McCulloch	Ainslie Park	3,000	5th

== League table ==
Note: Season voided after one match

Pos	Team	Pld	W	D	L	GF	GA	GD	Pts
1	Rangers	1	1	0	0	3	0	+3	3
2	Celtic	1	1	0	0	2	1	+1	3
3	Hibernian	1	1	0	0	1	0	+1	3
4	Motherwell	1	1	0	0	1	0	+1	3
5	Glasgow City	1	0	0	1	1	2	−1	0
6	Forfar Farmington	1	0	0	1	0	1	−1	0
7	Spartans	1	0	0	1	0	1	−1	0
8	Heart of Midlothian	1	0	0	1	0	3	−3	0

Updated to match(es) played on 23 February 2020. Source:
Rules for classification: 1) Points; 2) Goal difference; 3) Number of goals scored

=== Results ===
==== Matches 1 to 14 ====
Home \ Away	CEL	FOR	GLA	HOM	HIB	MOT	RAN	SPA
Celtic			2–1					
Forfar Farmington						0–1		
Glasgow City								
Heart of Midlothian								
Hibernian								1–0
Motherwell								
Rangers				3–0				
Spartans								

Updated to match(es) played on 23 February 2020. Source:
Legend: Blue = home team win; Yellow = draw; Red = away team win.
