= Suzy Shepherd =

Scottish footballer & coach (born 1975)

Personal information
- Birth name: Suzanne Robertson
- Date of birth: 3 July 1975 (age 51)
- Place of birth: Scotland
- Position: Defender

Senior career*
Years	Team	Apps	(Gls)
1997–2007	Hibernian		
2000	→ New Jersey Wildcats (loan)		
2001	→ New Jersey Wildcats (loan)		
2005	→ ÍBV (loan)		
2007–2009	Celtic		
2009–2011	Hibernian		
2009–2011	Hutchison Vale	15	(1)
2013–2016	Spartans		

International career
2001–2005	Scotland	11	(0)

Managerial career
- 2016–2017: Spartans
- 2018–2023: Boroughmuir Thistle
- 2024–: Dundee United
- * Club domestic league appearances and goals

Suzanne Shepherd (née Robertson; born 3 July 1975) is a Scottish football manager and former player whose position was defender. She has been the head coach of Dundee United Women since March 2024.

== Playing career ==
Raised in Edinburgh, Robertson did not play organised football until the age of 19. She joined Hibernian around the time the team was formed in 1997, and was a major part of their success in the first decade of the 21st century, winning three Scottish Women's Premier League championships, three Scottish Women's Cups and one SWPL Cup. She also spent time on loan in the United States with New Jersey Wildcats (alongside compatriot Debbie McWhinnie) and in Iceland with ÍBV (with fellow Scot Suzanne Malone).

In 2007, Robertson was recruited to be part of the new women's football setup at Celtic – the team reached the Scottish Cup final in their first season but were defeated by Hibs, and were unable to dethrone the increasingly dominant Glasgow City in the league. Robertson returned to Hibs in 2009 and lifted a further Scottish Cup and SWPL Cup before moving on to smaller Edinburgh teams Hutchison Vale and finally Spartans, where she began to transition into a coaching role but also appeared in one more Scottish Cup final at the age of 39 – Spartans were beaten 5–0 by Glasgow City.

During her first spell with Hibs, Robertson was selected 11 times by Scotland between 2001 and 2005.

== Coaching career ==
As her playing days drew to a close, Shepherd was appointed as the Spartans manager to succeed Debbi McCulloch in late 2015, taking up the role for the 2016 season in which the club finished 6th. They improved to 5th in 2017, but she stepped down at the end of the year. At that time she was also working as the assistant to Pauline Hamill, coach of the Scotland under-19 team.

Intending to take a break from the game, she was soon invited to take a leading role at Boroughmuir Thistle, an Edinburgh club with an extensive youth team network for girls but no financial backing from a men's club. She remained there for over five years, in which Boroughmuir consolidated their position in the third tier SWFL First Division, then were promoted to the Scottish Women's Premier League 2 in 2020 after the withdrawal of Hutchison Vale from the competition. The club survived at that level for three seasons, but Shepherd resigned as head coach at the end of 2022–23 campaign. In her vocation as a personal trainer, she had also overseen the development of Boroughmuir's most promising young player, Emma Watson, who soon moved on to a professional contract at Rangers and became a full international.

In March 2024, Shepherd was appointed head coach at Dundee United, after Graeme Hart was sacked with the side struggling near the foot of the table in their first-ever season in SWPL1. Two months later, the team retained their place in the top division by defeating Kilmarnock in the relegation/promotion play-off. Tipped again as likely relegation candidates before the 2024–25 season with three clubs to go down as the league was restructured, the young Terrors squad struggled badly (big defeats in the opening months of the campaign including 9–0 to Celtic on the opening day, 10–0 to Rangers and 13–0 to Glasgow City) and were confirmed as relegated with a month of the season remaining.

== Honours ==
Hibernian

- Scottish Women's Premier League: 2003–04, 2005–06, 2006–07
- Scottish Women's Cup: 2002–03, 2004–05, 2006–07, 2010
  - Runner-up 2011
- Scottish Women's Premier League Cup: 2004–05, 2011
  - Runner-up 2006–07

Celtic

- Scottish Women's Cup: Runner-up 2007–08

Spartans

- Scottish Women's Cup: Runner-up 2014

Individual

- Hibernian F.C. Hall of Fame inductee: 2024
