= 2020 Scottish Women's Premier League Cup =

Tournament details
- Country: Scotland
- Dates: February–March 2020
- Teams: 18

Final positions
- Champions: None – competition abandoned

Tournament statistics
- Matches played: 18
- Goals scored: 67 (3.72 per match)

The 2020 Scottish Women's Premier League Cup was the 19th edition of the SWPL Cup competition, which began in 2002. It was known as the Scottish Building Society Scottish Women's Premier League Cup for sponsorship reasons. The competition was to be contested by all 18 teams of the two divisions of the Scottish Women's Premier League (SWPL 1 and SWPL 2).

Due to the COVID-19 pandemic, the competition was halted in March and abandoned in July 2020 without a winner.

== Format ==
In a change to the format, the first and second teams in the 2019 Scottish Women's Premier League received a bye to the quarter-finals. The remaining teams in SWPL1 and SWPL2 were divided into four groups of four teams. The group winners and the two runners-up with the best records would advance to the quarter-finals. The two other runners-up along with the teams who finish third and the two fourth-placed teams with the best record would compete in the plate competition.

After the start of the COVID-19 pandemic, the Scottish FA banned the traditional practice of shaking hands between opponents and the match officials in a bid to help contain the virus.

== Teams ==
SWPL1	SWPL2
Celtic; Forfar Farmington; Glasgow City; Hibernian; Heart of Midlothian; Motherwell; Rangers; Spartans	Aberdeen; Boroughmuir Thistle; Dundee United; Glasgow Women; Hamilton Academical; Kilmarnock; Partick Thistle; Queen's Park; St Johnstone; Stirling University

Notes

1. QF: Received a bye to the quarter-finals.

== Group stage ==
=== Group A ===
==== Table ====
Pos	Team	Pld	W	D	L	GF	GA	GD	Pts	Qualification
1	Celtic	3	2	1	0	10	1	+9	7	Quarter-finals
2	Spartans	3	2	0	1	5	6	−1	6	SWPL Plate
3	St Johnstone	3	1	0	2	3	8	−5	3	SWPL Plate
4	Glasgow Women	3	0	1	2	3	6	−3	1	SWPL Plate

Rules for classification: 1) Points; 2) Goal difference; 3) Number of goals scored

==== Matches ====
9 February 2020	Spartans	1–0	St Johnstone	Edinburgh
13:00				Stadium: Ainslie Park

9 February 2020	Celtic	0–0	Glasgow Women	East Kilbride
14:00				Stadium: K-Park Training Academy

16 February 2020	St Johnstone	0–6	Celtic	Perth
16:00				Stadium: McDiarmid Park

16 February 2020	Glasgow Women	2–3	Spartans	Glasgow
16:00				Stadium: Petershill Park

1 March 2020	St Johnstone	3–1	Glasgow Women	Kinross
12:00				Stadium: Loch Leven Community Campus

1 March 2020	Spartans	1–4	Celtic	Edinburgh
15:00				Stadium: Ainslie Park

=== Group B ===
==== Table ====
Pos	Team	Pld	W	D	L	GF	GA	GD	Pts	Qualification
1	Rangers	2	2	0	0	6	0	+6	6	Quarter-finals
2	Hamilton Academical (Q)	3	2	0	1	8	4	+4	6	Quarter-finals
3	Dundee United	2	1	0	1	5	4	+1	3	SWPL Plate
4	Queen's Park (E)	3	0	0	3	3	14	−11	0	

Updated to match(es) played on 8 March 2020. Source:
Rules for classification: 1) Points; 2) Goal difference; 3) Number of goals scored
(E) Eliminated; (Q) Qualified for the phase indicated

==== Matches ====
16 February 2020	Queen's Park	1–6	Hamilton Academical	Glasgow
16:00				Stadium: Lesser Hampden

27 February 2020	Rangers	3–0	Queen's Park	Milngavie
20:00				Stadium: Rangers Training Centre

1 March 2020	Dundee United	5–2	Queen's Park	Dundee
14:00				Stadium: Regional Performance Centre

1 March 2020	Hamilton Academical	0–3	Rangers	Hamilton
15:00				Stadium: New Douglas Park

8 March 2020	Hamilton Academical	2–0	Dundee United	Hamilton
17:00				Stadium: New Douglas Park

15 March 2020	Dundee United	v	Rangers	Cowdenbeath
15:30				Stadium: North End Park

=== Group C ===
==== Table ====
Pos	Team	Pld	W	D	L	GF	GA	GD	Pts	Qualification
1	Heart of Midlothian (Q)	3	2	0	1	8	3	+5	6	Quarter-finals
2	Aberdeen	2	1	1	0	2	1	+1	4	Quarter-finals or SWPL Plate
3	Stirling University	2	1	0	1	4	4	0	3	SWPL Plate
4	Boroughmuir Thistle (E)	3	0	1	2	3	9	−6	1	

Updated to match(es) played on 1 March 2020. Source:
Rules for classification: 1) Points; 2) Goal difference; 3) Number of goals scored
(E) Eliminated; (Q) Qualified for the phase indicated

==== Matches ====
16 February 2020	Boroughmuir Thistle	2–4	Stirling University	Edinburgh
15:30				Stadium: Meggetland Sports Complex

16 February 2020	Aberdeen	2–1	Heart of Midlothian	Aberdeen
16:00				Stadium: Cormack Park

26 February 2020	Heart of Midlothian	5–1	Boroughmuir Thistle	Edinburgh
20:00				Stadium: John Brydson Arena

1 March 2020	Boroughmuir Thistle	0–0	Aberdeen	Edinburgh
14:00				Stadium: Meggetland Sport Complex

1 March 2020	Heart of Midlothian	2–0	Stiring University	Edinburgh
15:30				Stadium: John Brydson Arena

15 March 2020	Stirling University	v	Aberdeen	Stirling
14:00				Stadium: Gannochy Sports Centre

=== Group D ===
==== Table ====
Pos	Team	Pld	W	D	L	GF	GA	GD	Pts	Qualification
1	Forfar Farmington	3	2	0	1	4	4	0	6	Quarter-finals
2	Partick Thistle	2	1	1	0	5	2	+3	4	Quarter-finals or SWPL Plate
3	Motherwell	2	1	0	1	4	2	+2	3	SWPL Plate
4	Kilmarnock (Q)	3	0	1	2	2	7	−5	1	SWPL Plate

Updated to match(es) played on 1 March 2020. Source:
Rules for classification: 1) Points; 2) Goal difference; 3) Number of goals scored
(Q) Qualified for the phase indicated

==== Matches ====
9 February 2020	Forfar Farmington	2–0	Kilmarnock	Forfar
14:00				Stadium: Station Park

16 February 2020	Partick Thistle	3–0 (Awarded)	Forfar Farmington	Glasgow
12:00				Stadium: Petershill Park

16 February 2020	Kilmarnock	0–3 (Awarded)	Motherwell	Kilmarnock
				Stadium: Grange Academy

1 March 2020	Partick Thistle	2–2	Kilmarnock	Glasgow
12:00				Stadium: Firhill Stadium

1 March 2020	Motherwell	1–2	Forfar Farmington	Motherwell
14:00				Stadium: Ravenscraig Regional Sports Facility

9 March 2020	Motherwell	v	Partick Thistle	Motherwell
20:00				Stadium: Bothwellhaugh Football Pitches

=== Ranking of second-placed teams ===
Pos	Grp	Team	Pld	W	D	L	GF	GA	GD	Pts	Qualification
1	B	Hamilton Academical (Q)	3	2	0	1	8	4	+4	6	Quarter-finals
2	A	Spartans	3	2	0	1	5	6	−1	6	Quarter-finals
3	D	Partick Thistle	2	1	1	0	5	2	+3	4	SWPL Plate
4	C	Aberdeen	2	1	1	0	2	1	+1	4	SWPL Plate

Updated to match(es) played on 8 March 2020. Source:
Rules for classification: 1) Points; 2) Goal difference; 3) Number of goals scored
(Q) Qualified for the phase indicated

=== Ranking of fourth-placed teams ===
Pos	Team	Pld	W	D	L	GF	GA	GD	Pts	Qualification
1	Glasgow Women (Q)	3	0	1	2	3	6	−3	1	SWPL Plate
2	Kilmarnock (Q)	3	0	1	2	2	7	−5	1	SWPL Plate
3	Boroughmuir Thistle (E)	3	0	1	2	3	9	−6	1	
4	Queen's Park (E)	3	0	0	3	3	14	−11	0	

Updated to match(es) played on 8 March 2020. Source:
Rules for classification: 1) Points; 2) Goal difference; 3) Number of goals scored
(E) Eliminated; (Q) Qualified for the phase indicated

=== Notes ===
1. Note 1: Postponed on 9 February 2020 due to adverse weather.
2. Note 2: Postponed on 16 February 2020 due to adverse weather.
3. Note 3: Partick Thistle and Motherwell were awarded 3–0 wins against Forfar Farmington and Kilmarnock respectively as neither side had "just cause" in calling off their fixtures. Both clubs were fined £100 each for failing to fulfil fixtures.

== Knock-out phase ==
Confirmed clubs:

SWPL1	SWPL2
Celtic; Glasgow City; Hibernian; Heart of Midlothian	Hamilton Academical

The draw for the quarter-finals was scheduled for Tuesday 17 March 2020 with the ties due to be played on Sunday 29 March 2020.

== SWPL Plate ==
Confirmed clubs:

SWPL1	SWPL2
Spartans	Glasgow Women; Kilmarnock; St Johnstone

The draw for the Plate quarter-finals was scheduled for Tuesday 17 March 2020 with the ties due to be played on Sunday 29 March 2020.
