= 2006–07 Scottish Women's Premier League Cup =

Tournament details
- Country: Scotland

Final positions
- Champions: Edinburgh
- Runners-up: Hibernian

Tournament statistics
- Matches played: 11
- Goals scored: 65 (5.91 per match)

The 2006–07 Scottish Women's Premier League Cup was the 5th edition of the Scottish Women's Premier League Cup which began in 2002. Sponsored by Thompsons Solicitors, it was contested by all 12 teams of the Scottish Women's Premier League (SWPL), with matches played between September and December 2006.

== First Round ==
Hutchison Vale, Hibernian, Raith Rovers and Lochee United received byes.

Teams in bold advanced to the quarter-finals.

Home team	Score	Away team
3 September 2006
Glasgow City	2–2 (Note: After extra time; Newburgh won 4–3 in a penalty shootout.)	**Newburgh**
Arsenal North	5–7 (Note: After extra time.)	**FC Kilmarnock**
Aberdeen	3–7	**Hamilton Academical**
Forfar Farmington	1–4	**Edinburgh**

== Quarter-finals ==
Teams in bold advanced to the semi-finals.

Home team	Score	Away team
1 October 2006
Hutchison Vale	0–4	**FC Kilmarnock**
**Newburgh**	3–1	Hamilton Academical
**Hibernian**	8–1	Raith Rovers
Lochee United	0–4	**Edinburgh**

== Semi-finals ==
Teams in bold advanced to the final.

22 October 2006

Edinburgh	3–1	FC Kilmarnock

22 October 2006

Newburgh	0–4	Hibernian

== Final ==
The final was postponed from its original date of 18 November 2006. Edinburgh claimed the trophy in their maiden appearance in the final. This would prove to be the only domestic match lost by Hibernian during the 2006–07 season.

30 November 2006
19:45

Edinburgh	4–1	Hibernian
Barry 1', 80'; M. McKean 44'; McWhinnie 47'		Grant 25'

Broadwood Stadium, Cumbernauld
Referee: Mathilde Pearce

**Edinburgh**	**Hibernian**
