= 2010 Scottish Women's Premier League =

Scottish Women's Premier League
- Season: 2010
- Champions: Glasgow City (5th title)
- Relegated: Aberdeen
- Champions League: Glasgow City
- Matches: 132
- Top goalscorer: Diana Barry (43)
- Biggest home win: Glasgow City 29–0 FC Kilmarnock
- Biggest away win: Dundee United SC 0–21 Spartans
- Highest scoring: Glasgow City 29–0 FC Kilmarnock
- Longest winning run: Glasgow City, 12 (13 June – 7 November)
- Longest unbeaten run: Glasgow City, 22 (14 March – 7 November)
- Longest winless run: FC Kilmarnock, 19 (21 March – 24 October)
- Longest losing run: FC Kilmarnock, 19 (21 March – 24 October)

The 2010 Scottish Women's Premier League was the ninth season of the Scottish Women's Premier League, the top level of women's football in Scotland. 12 teams contested the championship. It was played as a double round-robin within the 2010 calendar year (matches were played between March and November), following a format change in 2009. As that 2009 season had been a transitional, shortened campaign with only one round of fixtures, it was determined that no promotion or relegation would take place, although a championship title was still awarded, and the participants in 2010 were unchanged.

Glasgow City won the championship with a near-perfect record (21 victories 1 draw, 0 defeats) and qualified for the 2011–12 UEFA Women's Champions League. It was their fourth consecutive title, and fifth overall. The bottom-ranked team, Aberdeen, was relegated to the Scottish Women's Football League First Division.

== League standings ==
Pos	Team	Pld	W	D	L	GF	GA	GD	Pts	Qualification
1	Glasgow City (C)	22	21	1	0	184	7	+177	64	2011–12 Champions League
2	Celtic	22	19	1	2	136	17	+119	58	
3	Spartans	22	16	0	6	102	32	+70	48	
4	Hibernian	22	14	1	7	106	28	+78	43	
5	Forfar Farmington	22	12	2	8	60	37	+23	38	
6	Hamilton Academical	22	12	2	8	64	45	+19	38	
7	Inverness City	22	9	2	11	39	68	−29	29	
8	Rangers	22	8	4	10	52	53	−1	28	
9	Boroughmuir Thistle	22	7	2	13	41	58	−17	23	
10	Dundee United SC	22	2	1	19	19	149	−130	7	
11	FC Kilmarnock	22	2	0	20	18	214	−196	6	
12	Aberdeen (R)	22	1	2	19	16	129	−113	5	Relegation to 2011 SWFL First Division

Rules for classification: 1) Points; 2) Goal difference; 3) Number of goals scored
(C) Champions; (R) Relegated
