= Kerry Montgomery =

Northern Irish footballer

Personal information
- Date of birth: 25 March 1988 (age 38)
- Place of birth: Edinburgh, Scotland
- Position: Midfielder

Team information
- Current team: Motherwell
- Number: 8

Senior career*
Years	Team	Apps	(Gls)
2005–2007	Hibernian		
2007–2008	Raith Rovers		
2008–2010	Boroughmuir Thistle		
2011	Raith Rovers		
2012–2015	Spartans	35	(12)
2015	Glasgow City		
2016–2017	Celtic		
2018–	Motherwell		

International career^{‡}
2007	Scotland U19	3	(0)
2008	Scotland U23		
2016–2019	Northern Ireland	7	(0)
- * Club domestic league appearances and goals as of 19:46, 30 August 2019 (UTC) ‡ National team caps and goals as of 19:46, 30 August 2019 (UTC)

Kerry Montgomery (born 25 March 1988) is a footballer who plays as a midfielder. Born in Scotland, she has appeared for the Northern Ireland women's national team.

== Career ==
At club level, Montgomery's teams – all in Scotland – include Spartans (where she was voted the Scottish Women's Premier League Player of the Year for 2014), Glasgow City (where she won the 2015 domestic treble and appeared in the UEFA Women's Champions League), Celtic and Motherwell.

Having played for Scotland at youth levels and been selected for a senior squad in 2014 without being used, she switched her international allegiance and has been capped for the Northern Ireland national team, appearing for the team during the 2019 FIFA Women's World Cup qualifying cycle.
