= Suzanne Mulvey =

Scottish footballer

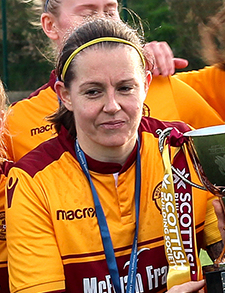
- Suzanne Mulvey with Motherwell FC after winning 2018 Scottish Women's Cup

Personal information
- Date of birth: 4 October 1984 (age 42)
- Place of birth: Edinburgh, Scotland
- Height: 5 ft 6 in (1.68 m)
- Position: Forward

Youth career
- Hibernian

Senior career*
Years	Team	Apps	(Gls)
- Hibernian
2005	ÍBV	10	(3)
2006–2007	Hamilton Academical		
2007	Glasgow City	2	(3)
2007–2009	Celtic		
2009–2011	Glasgow City		
2011–2012	Hamilton Academical		
2013	Glasgow City	16	(13)
2014	Rangers		(20)
2015	Sunderland	5	(5)
2016	Celtic		(20)
2018	Motherwell		(26)
2019	Celtic		
2020–2021	Partick Thistle		
2021	Forfar Farmington		

International career
2007–2014	Scotland	37	(4)
- * Club domestic league appearances and goals

Suzanne Mulvey (née Malone; born 4 October 1984) is a Scottish footballer who plays as a forward and represented Scotland at the senior international level.

== Club career ==
Mulvey started her playing career with Hibernian after moving up from their youth teams.

In the 2005 summer season, Mulvey played in Iceland with ÍBV (alongside Hibs teammate Suzy Robertson) and scored three goals in ten Úrvalsdeild appearances.

Her spell with Hibernian showcased her as one of the most promising young players in Scotland at the time and brought her to the attention of everyone in the game, however, Mulvey brought her time with Hibernian to an end when she moved to play for Hamilton.

After Hamilton, she spent a brief spell at Glasgow City, where her time was hampered by a knee injury, before moving to newly founded Celtic in late 2007, where she scored goals but struggled to hold down a place in the line-up.

Mulvey moved back to Glasgow City in the 2009 pre-season and started her time with the club in Lithuania, in the UEFA Women's Champions League, where she scored four goals in their fixture against Norchi Dinamoeli of Georgia.

In 2011 Mulvey returned to Hamilton Academical on loan after a serious back injury had curtailed her involvement with City over the previous two years.

In December 2013, Mulvey signed for Rangers Ladies and in her first start for the club she scored the winner in a 2–1 victory over rivals Celtic. She signed for Sunderland in February 2015 after a trial period in which she scored a hat-trick against her former Rangers teammates, then scored again in a win over Everton; however, problems with injuries and travel (she was commuting from Glasgow to Wearside) proved too difficult to overcome and she soon returned to Scotland. She re-joined Celtic for the 2016 season.

In January 2018, Mulvey signed for second-tier Motherwell, reuniting her with her former Glasgow City boss Eddie Wolecki Black. The season ended with the team reaching the 2018 Scottish Women's Cup final and winning the SWPL2 to gain promotion and Mulvey was named the division's player of the year as well as its top scorer (26 goals). On the back of her strong form, she was signed by Celtic for a third time (initially as a trialist) in 2019.

At the start of the 2020 season she moved to SWPL-2 Partick Thistle, but all football was soon cancelled due to the COVID-19 pandemic; she remained with the Jags when play resumed in 2020–21, and moved to Forfar Farmington as player-coach supporting Eddie Wolecki Black for 2021–22, only for the women-only Angus club to withdraw from the league prior to its start having been unable to recruit a competitive squad.

== International career ==
Mulvey's first full international match listed on the SFA's website was in February 2007 against Japan; However, Rec.Sport.Soccer Statistics Foundation reports that she had scored goals for the senior team against Switzerland and the Czech Republic in 2004. She played twice more in the 2006–07 season. In August 2009, following her early season form at Glasgow City, Mulvey was recalled to the Scotland squad after a two-year absence for the game against Switzerland. She was in the squad regularly in 2013, with her final cap coming in 2014.

== Personal life ==
Suzanne has three sons.
