= Diana Barry =

Scottish women's footballer

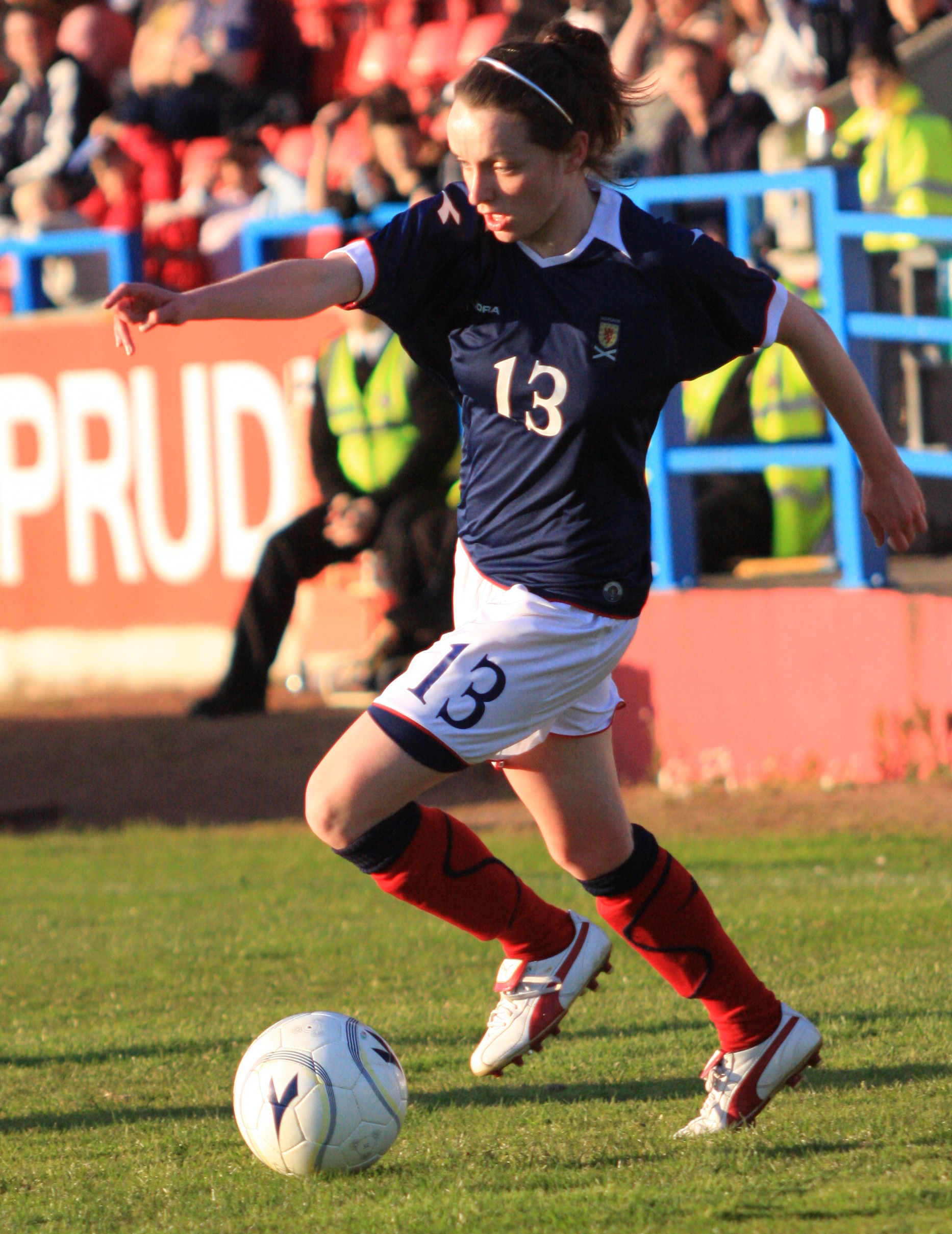
- Barry playing for Scotland in May 2009

Personal information
- Full name: Diana Elizabeth Barry
- Date of birth: 25 June 1986 (age 40)
- Place of birth: Edinburgh, Scotland
- Position: Forward

Youth career
- 2000–2003: Hibernian

Senior career*
Years	Team	Apps	(Gls)
2003–2005	Whitehill Welfare		
2005–2006	Glasgow City		
2006–2013	Spartans		

International career
2008	Scotland U23	1	(0)
2009–2011	Scotland	11	(0)
- * Club domestic league appearances and goals

Diana Elizabeth Barry (born 25 June 1986) is a Scottish former footballer who played as a forward.

Born and raised in Edinburgh, she had a season with Glasgow City in which she appeared in the 2005–06 UEFA Women's Cup and was part of the squad which won the Scottish Women's Cup in 2006, but the majority of her club career was in her hometown with Spartans in the Scottish Women's Premier League where she spent ten years (including two seasons when the team was known as Whitehill Welfare, and two seasons playing as Edinburgh Ladies prior to its absorption by The Spartans F.C. in 2008) and became its all-time top goalscorer with 133 goals in all competitions. As Edinburgh Ladies, the club had won the SWPL Cup in 2006–07 and reached five of the next six finals in that competition as Spartans, but lost them all; they also finished as league runners-up just behind Glasgow City in 2008–09.

Barry was named the league's Players' Player of the Year for the 2010 season after scoring 43 goals. Her good form in that period also led to her being selected for the Scotland national team, earning 11 caps between 2009 and 2011, mostly as a late substitute, without scoring.

An amateur player who had to juggle her sporting activities with work and studies, in 2012 she was training as a history teacher. Her departure from Spartans at the end of the 2013 SWPL season aged 27 appears to have marked her retiral from playing at a high level, as no records have been found to show her with any further clubs.
