= Megan Sneddon =

Scottish footballer (born 1985)

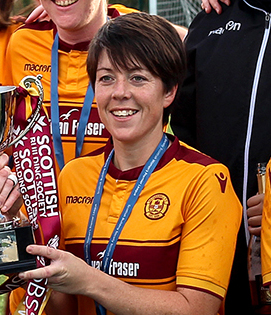
- Sneddon in 2018 with Motherwell

Personal information
- Date of birth: 9 September 1985 (age 41)
- Place of birth: Bellshill, Scotland
- Height: 5 ft 3 in (1.60 m)
- Position: Central midfielder

Team information
- Current team: Motherwell
- Number: 9

Youth career
- Rosella
- St Mirren
- East Kilbride Burgh

Senior career*
Years	Team	Apps	(Gls)
2000–2005	Kilmarnock		
2005–2006	Queen's Park		
2006–2011	Glasgow City	85	(18)
2011	Liverpool		
2011–2012	Celtic	39	(6)
2013–2014	Rangers	20	(5)
2015–2016	Motherwell	6	(1)
2018–	Motherwell		

International career^{‡}
2002–2015	Scotland	130	(4)
2008	Scotland U-23	2	(0)
- * Club domestic league appearances and goals as of 18:55, 1 November 2015 (UTC) (UTC) ‡ National team caps and goals as of 18:55, 1 November 2015 (UTC) (UTC)

Megan Burns (née Sneddon; born 9 September 1985) is a Scottish footballer who plays for Motherwell in the Scottish Women's Premier League. Sneddon made her senior Scotland debut aged 16 and amassed 130 appearances for the national team.

== Club career ==
Sneddon spent five years with Kilmarnock, winning a treble in 2002 aged just 16. In July 2006, she joined Glasgow City. On 18 April 2010, she made her 100th appearance for the club in a 4–2 victory against Spartans.

In February 2011, Sneddon was called into Scotland's Cyprus Cup squad, listed as a Liverpool player. She had decided to leave Glasgow City after growing dissatisfied with the club. Sneddon made her debut for the FA WSL club in a friendly win over Hibernian. However, on the eve of the English season Sneddon signed for Celtic. She cited personal reasons and the advice of Scotland coach Anna Signeul for the decision.

Sneddon signed for Rangers in January 2013.

On 19 August 2015, Sneddon followed in the footsteps of several of her former Scotland teammates by signing for ambitious Motherwell. She said of her signing: "I am delighted that Motherwell have given me the chance to kick start my career. I'm looking forward to getting back on the pitch as I've hardly kicked a ball since November. It will also be great to play alongside some familiar faces as well." She signed for Motherwell again in 2018.

== International career ==
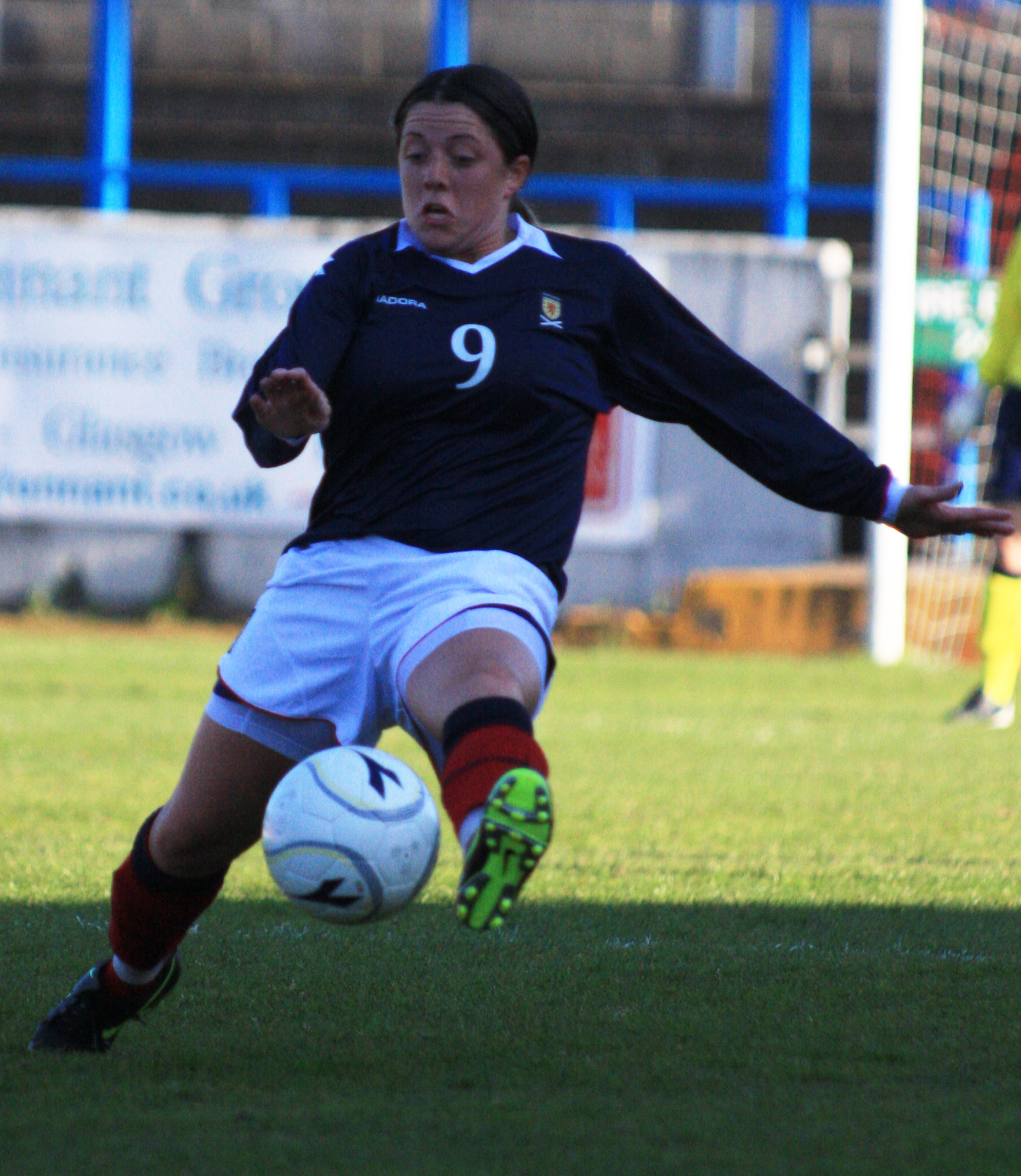
Sneddon playing for Scotland in 2009

Sneddon made her senior debut for Scotland the day before her 17th birthday, in an 8–2 defeat to the United States in Columbus, Ohio.

Sneddon was picked for the Scotland U23 women's squad to play at the Nordic Tournament in August 2008. She captained the team at the tournament.

In December 2011, Sneddon was one of four Celtic players to be approached about playing for Team GB at the 2012 Olympics.

She ended her international career after Scotland failed to qualify for the 2015 FIFA Women's World Cup, publicly criticising the tactics of Anna Signeul and also speaking of the difficulties faced by players with various footballing commitments for club and country on top of a job outside the game.

== Honours ==
=== Individual ===
- East Kilbride Female Sports Personality of the Year: 2008
- South Lanarkshire Senior Performer of the Year: 2009
- Scottish FA International Player of the Year: 2011
- SWPL Players' Player of the Year: 2013

== See also ==
- List of women's footballers with 100 or more caps
- Scottish FA Women's International Roll of Honour
