= Debbie McWhinnie =

Scottish footballer (born 1981)

Personal information
- Full name: Debbie McWhinnie
- Date of birth: 31 January 1981 (age 45)
- Position: Forward

Senior career*
Years	Team	Apps	(Gls)
- Cumbernauld
- Clyde
- Shettleston
2003–2004	Glasgow City	25	(45)
2004–2006	Hibernian Ladies		
2006–2009	Edinburgh City		
2010–2011	Hibernian Ladies		

International career^{‡}
1997–2004	Scotland	41	(11)
- * Club domestic league appearances and goals as of 12:00, 16 August 2011 (UTC) ‡ National team caps and goals as of 13:50, 9 March 2012 (UTC)

Debbie McWhinnie (born 31 January 1981) is a former Scottish international football striker. She last played in the Scottish Women's Premier League for Hibernian Ladies, having previously represented Spartans and Glasgow City.

== Club career ==
As a teenager, McWhinnie spent time with the New Jersey Wildcats in the United States, alongside compatriot Suzy Robertson. In February 2004, McWhinnie scored a record 12 goals in Glasgow City's 28–0 Scottish Women's Cup win over third division Motherwell. City manager Peter Caulfield called McWhinnie "the best striker playing in Scotland, with national No.1 Julie Fleeting at Arsenal." After scoring 72 goals in 36 appearances for Glasgow City, McWhinnie signed for reigning Scottish champions Hibernian in summer 2004. She scored 10 goals in Hibs' 17–0 win over East Kilbride in August 2004.

== International career ==
In January 1997, 15–year–old McWhinnie was part of a youthful Scotland national team who toured Brazil; suffering 5–0, 6–0 and 7–1 defeats to their hosts. She was reportedly offered a professional contract to play club football in Brazil.

McWhinnie and Julie Fleeting scored Scotland's goals in an 8–2 friendly defeat to United States before 6,295 fans in Columbus, Ohio on 8 September 2002.
