= 2008–09 Scottish Women's Premier League Cup =

Tournament details
- Country: Scotland

Final positions
- Champions: Glasgow City
- Runners-up: Spartans

Tournament statistics
- Matches played: 10
- Goals scored: 56 (5.6 per match)

The 2008–09 Scottish Women's Premier League Cup was the 7th edition of the Scottish Women's Premier League Cup which began in 2002. It was contested by all 12 teams of the Scottish Women's Premier League (SWPL), with matches played between August and November 2008.

== First Round ==
Hamilton Academical, Hibernian, Boroughmuir Thistle and Dundee United SC received byes.

Teams in bold advanced to the quarter-finals.

Home team	Score	Away team
17 August 2008
**Glasgow City**	w/o (Note: Queen's Park withdrew from the competition.)	Queen's Park
Forfar Farmington	1–4	**Spartans**
**Celtic**	9–1	Aberdeen
Raith Rovers	0–3	**FC Kilmarnock**

== Quarter-finals ==
Teams in bold advanced to the semi-finals.

Home team	Score	Away team
14 September 2008
**Celtic**	5–1	Dundee United SC
FC Kilmarnock	2–3	**Glasgow City**
**Hibernian**	7–0	Boroughmuir Thistle
**Spartans**	5–0	Hamilton Academical

== Semi-finals ==
Teams in bold advanced to the final.

5 October 2008

Glasgow City	3–1	Celtic

Petershill Park, Springburn
8 October 2008

Hibernian	3–5	Spartans

Heriot-Watt University, Riccarton
Attendance: 100
Referee: Lorraine Clark

== Final ==
Glasgow City won the cup for the first time, in their fourth appearance in the final. It was a first defeat at this stage for Spartans, who had claimed the trophy two seasons earlier under the 'Edinburgh Ladies' identity in their only previous final appearance. Glasgow City also won the 2008–09 Scottish Women's Premier League and the 2008–09 Scottish Women's Cup to complete a 'treble'.

8 November 2008

Glasgow City	3–0	Spartans
J. Ross 47' 66'; Littlejohn 53'

Forthbank Stadium, Stirling

**Glasgow City**	**Spartans**
