= 2010 Scottish Women's Premier League Cup =

Tournament details
- Country: Scotland

Final positions
- Champions: Celtic
- Runners-up: Spartans

Tournament statistics
- Matches played: 11
- Goals scored: 49 (4.45 per match)

The 2010 Scottish Women's Premier League Cup was the 9th edition of the Scottish Women's Premier League Cup which began in 2002. It was contested by all 12 teams of the Scottish Women's Premier League (SWPL), with matches played between February and May 2010.

After the transition of the women's football schedule in Scotland from autumn-spring to summer, the early-season SWPL Cup was completed in the first half of a calendar year instead of the second half as in previous editions; the 2010 final was played only 6 months after the 2009 final. The format remained unchanged.

== First Round ==
Inverness, FC Kilmarnock, Rangers and Aberdeen received byes.

Teams in bold advanced to the quarter-finals.

| Home team | Score | Away team |
21 February 2010
| **Hamilton Academical** | 3–0 | Forfar Farmington |
7 March 2010
| Dundee United SC | 3–4 (Note: After extra time; 2–2 after 90 minutes.) | **Spartans** |
| Boroughmuir Thistle | 1–3 | **Celtic** |
| **Glasgow City** | 2–0 | Hibernian |

== Quarter-finals ==
Teams in bold advanced to the semi-finals.

| Home team | Score | Away team |
7 March 2010
| **Inverness** | 3–1 | Hamilton Academical |
| FC Kilmarnock | 0–5 | **Aberdeen** |
17 March 2010
| **Spartans** | 5–2 | Rangers |
18 March 2010
| Glasgow City | 1–2 | **Celtic** |

== Semi-finals ==
Teams in bold advanced to the final.

21 April 2010

| Celtic | 5–0 | Aberdeen |

22 April 2010

| Spartans | 4–0 | Inverness |

Riverside Stadium, Perth

== Final ==
Celtic won the trophy in their first appearance in the final; it was the club's first honour in women's football. Although played on their home ground, Spartans were defeated in a SWPL Cup final for the second time.

12 May 2010

| Spartans | 1–4 | Celtic |
|---|---|---|
| C. Crosbie 85' | | Love 25' 60'; Murray 43' 68' |

Spartans Academy, Edinburgh
Attendance: 500

| **Spartans** | **Celtic** |
