= 2008–09 Scottish Women's Cup =

Tournament details
- Country: Scotland

Final positions
- Champions: Glasgow City
- Runners-up: Rangers

The 2008–09 Scottish Women's Cup was the 38th official edition (40th overall) of the Scottish Women's Cup, the main knockout tournament in women's football in Scotland. Sponsored by Unite, matches were played between January and May 2009.

== Third round ==
Teams in bold advanced to the quarter-finals.

Home team	Score	Away team
22 February 2009
Linwood Rangers	0–7	**Dundee United SC**
**Glasgow City**	4–3 (Note: After extra time)	Celtic
Celtic Reserves	2–2 (Note: Aberdeen won 4–3 in a penalty shootout.)	**Aberdeen**
Raith Rovers	2–5	**Rangers**
**Glasgow City Reserves**	2–0	Boroughmuir Thistle
Forfar Farmington	1–4	**Spartans**
Falkirk	0–6	**Hibernian**
**Hamilton Academical**	4–1	Inverness

== Quarter-finals ==
Teams in bold advanced to the semi-finals.

Home team	Score	Away team
22 March 2009
**Spartans**	2–0	Hibernian
Glasgow City Reserves	2–4	**Rangers**
**Glasgow City**	3–0	Dundee United SC
Aberdeen	2–3	**Hamilton Academical**

== Semi-finals ==
Teams in bold advanced to the final.

15 April 2009

Glasgow City	8–1	Hamilton Academical

Toryglen Regional Football Centre, Glasgow
16 April 2009

Rangers	6–5 (a.e.t.)	Spartans

Toryglen Regional Football Centre, Glasgow

== Final ==
Glasgow City won the cup for the third time in their history (after 2004 and 2006), proving too strong for first-time finalists Rangers who were in their first season competing under the identity of the famous men's club (they took over existing lower-division members Paisley Saints). Glasgow City also won that season's Scottish Women's Premier League championship and SWPL Cup to complete a 'treble'. Rangers won the SWFL First Division to join the top tier for the following season.

17 May 2009

Glasgow City	5–0	Rangers
Lappin; L. Ross; J. Brown

Forthbank Stadium, Stirling

**Glasgow City**	**Rangers**
