= Sarah Clelland =

Scottish footballer

Personal information
- Full name: Sarah Isabel Clelland
- Date of birth: 11 August 1997 (age 29)
- Place of birth: East Kilbride, Scotland
- Position: Full back

Team information
- Current team: Spartans
- Number: 3

Senior career*
Years	Team	Apps	(Gls)
2011–2015	Rangers		
2015–2016	Glasgow City		
2016–	Spartans		

International career
2013	Scotland U17		
2014–2016	Scotland U19		
- * Club domestic league appearances and goals

Sarah Isabel Clelland (born 11 August 1997) is a Scottish football who plays for Spartans in the Scottish Women's Premier League (SWPL) as a full back. She has also played international handball for Scotland and Great Britain.

== Club career ==
Clelland played for four years at Rangers before she joined Glasgow City in August 2015. In July 2016, she signed for Spartans.

== International career ==
Clelland has represented Scotland at the under-17 and under-19 levels, including at the 2014 UEFA Women's Under-17 Championship, 2015 UEFA Women's Under-17 Championship, and 2017 UEFA Women's Under-19 Championships.

== Honors ==
Glasgow City

- Scottish Women's Premier League: 2015
- Scottish Women's Cup: 2015
