= 2008–09 Scottish Women's Premier League =

Scottish Women's Premier League
- Season: 2008–09
- Champions: Glasgow City (3rd title)
- Relegated: Queen's Park (withdrew); Raith Rovers
- Champions League: Glasgow City
- Matches: 110
- Biggest home win: Glasgow City 12–0 Boroughmuir Thistle
- Biggest away win: Raith Rovers 1–12 Glasgow City
- Highest scoring: Raith Rovers 1–12 Glasgow City

The 2008–09 Scottish Women's Premier League was the seventh season of the Scottish Women's Premier League, the top level of women's football in Scotland. Matches were played between August 2008 and May 2009.

12 teams were originally invited to contest the championship, with Boroughmuir Thistle and Dundee United SC, winners and runners-up respectively in the 2007–08 SWFL First Division (Boroughmuir had completed that season as Dalkeith Thistle), taking the places of Newburgh, who had folded prior to the start of the 2007–08 SWPL leaving the division with 11 teams, and relegated Vale of Clyde. However, Queen's Park withdrew after the 2008–09 campaign started but without having themselves playing a match, so 11 teams again took part.

Glasgow City won the championship by a margin of two points ahead of Spartans (previously known as Edinburgh Ladies) and three ahead of Celtic, who were the only team to defeat them, to qualify for the 2009–10 UEFA Women's Champions League. It was their second consecutive title, and third overall. Glasgow City also won the 2008–09 Scottish Women's Premier League Cup and the 2008–09 Scottish Women's Cup to complete the 'treble'. With one place already vacated for the following season with the withdrawal of Queen's Park, the only team to be relegated conventionally was Raith Rovers.

It was decided that the SWPL would change from a winter to a summer schedule going forwards, so a transitional, shortened campaign with only one round of fixtures was played in the second half of 2009.

== League standings ==
| Pos | Team | Pld | W | D | L | GF | GA | GD | Pts | Qualification |
|---|---|---|---|---|---|---|---|---|---|---|
| 1 | Glasgow City (C) | 20 | 17 | 2 | 1 | 106 | 12 | +94 | 53 | 2009–10 Champions League |
| 2 | Spartans | 20 | 16 | 3 | 1 | 85 | 21 | +64 | 51 | |
| 3 | Celtic | 20 | 16 | 2 | 2 | 78 | 18 | +60 | 50 | |
| 4 | Hibernian | 20 | 9 | 3 | 8 | 47 | 41 | +6 | 30 | |
| 5 | Aberdeen | 20 | 7 | 2 | 11 | 27 | 48 | −21 | 23 | |
| 6 | Forfar Farmington | 20 | 5 | 7 | 8 | 24 | 37 | −13 | 22 | |
| 7 | Dundee United | 20 | 6 | 3 | 11 | 34 | 59 | −25 | 21 | |
| 8 | FC Kilmarnock | 20 | 5 | 3 | 12 | 27 | 59 | −32 | 18 | |
| 9 | Boroughmuir Thistle | 20 | 4 | 5 | 11 | 23 | 65 | −42 | 17 | |
| 10 | Hamilton Academical | 20 | 4 | 3 | 13 | 24 | 52 | −28 | 15 | |
| 11 | Raith Rovers (R) | 20 | 2 | 5 | 13 | 25 | 88 | −63 | 11 | Relegation to 2009 SWFL First Division |

Rules for classification: 1) Points; 2) Goal difference; 3) Number of goals scored
(C) Champions; (R) Relegated
