= Peter Caulfield =

Peter Caulfield may refer to:

- Peter Caulfield (football manager) (born 1959)
- Peter Caulfield (actor) (born 1984)
