= Kirsty McBride =

Scottish footballer (born 1985)

Personal information
- Full name: Kirsty McBride
- Date of birth: 9 September 1985 (age 41)
- Place of birth: Tranent, Scotland
- Position: Left midfielder

Team information
- Current team: Motherwell Ladies
- Number: 11

Youth career
- Hawthorn Boys' Club
- Leith Athletic
- 1999–2002: Hibernian Girls

Senior career*
| Years | Team | Apps | (Gls) |
| 2002–2004 | Hibernian Ladies | | |
| 2004–2005 | Arsenal | | |
| 2005–2010 | Hibernian Ladies | | |
| 2011–2015 | Celtic | | |
| 2015– | Motherwell Ladies | 8 | (7) |

International career^{‡}
| 2003– | Scotland | 59 | (2) |
- * Club domestic league appearances and goals ‡ National team caps and goals as of 13:55, 12 May 2012 (UTC)

Kirsty McBride (born 9 September 1985) is a Scottish football midfielder who plays for Motherwell in the SWFL 2nd Division. She has represented the Scotland women's national football team more than 50 times at senior level.

== Early life ==
After taking up football aged eight, McBride had to leave her first club Hawthorn Boys when she was 12, moving on to Leith Athletic. She was educated at Ross High School.

== Club career ==
McBride joined Hibernian in 1999. McBride captained Hibs Girls and was promoted to the senior team after season 2001–02. In October 2004 McBride was subject to a transfer bid from Arsenal Ladies. She featured as a late substitute in Arsenal's 3–0 FA Women's Premier League Cup final victory over Charlton Athletic at Griffin Park. She returned to Hibernian after one year away.

Prior to the 2015 season, McBride joined several of her ex Hibs teammates at ambitious Motherwell. Three months after signing, she formed part of the starting eleven which won the SWFL Second Division Cup, beating Rangers 2–6 in the Final.

== International career ==
In June 2003, 17–year–old McBride made her senior debut for Scotland in an 8–1 win over Portugal. She won her 50th cap in October 2009; an away victory over Greece at the Yiannis Pathiakakis Stadium.

She was unavailable for the 2008 Cyprus Cup because of work commitments.
