= Emma Black (footballer) =

Scottish footballer (born 1987)

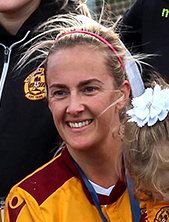
- Black in 2018 with Motherwell

Personal information
- Date of birth: 12 March 1987 (age 39)
- Place of birth: Coatbridge, Scotland
- Height: 5 ft 5 in (1.65 m)
- Position: Defender

Youth career
- Cumbernauld Cosmos

Senior career*
Years	Team	Apps	(Gls)
2004–2015	Glasgow City	107+	(33+)
2018	Motherwell		
2019	Celtic	12	(0)

International career^{‡}
2009–2014	Scotland	42	(1)
- * Club domestic league appearances and goals as of 14 September 2010 ‡ National team caps and goals as of 07:22, 4 April 2023 (UTC)

Emma Black (née Fernon; born 12 March 1987) is a Scottish female international football During her international career, Black earned 42 caps and scored once for the Scotland women's national football team. Emma now works with various outlets commentating on the womans game

== Club career ==
Black began her career with Glasgow City as a striker, before subsequently converting to defence. She has currently helped the club win seven successive Scottish Women's Premier League titles, adding to a previous success in 2004–05, and has participated in the UEFA Women's Champions League where she became the club's first ever European goalscorer when she netted against Athletic Bilbao, in August 2006.

Black retired from playing in 2015 to concentrate on raising a family. In December 2018 she signed for Celtic.

== International career ==
Black captained the Scotland under-19 side before making her debut for the senior side in August 2009, against the Netherlands as second-half substitute for Kirsty McBride. She scored her first international goal in a friendly against Northern Ireland in May 2010.

=== International goals ===
Results list Scotland's goal tally first

Goal	Date	Venue	Opponent	Result	Competition	Scored
1	23 May 2010	Strathclyde Homes Stadium, Dumbarton	Northern Ireland	2–0	Friendly	1
