= Robert Docherty =

Scottish footballer and manager

Personal information
- Full name: Robert John Docherty
- Date of birth: 11 September 1965 (age 61)
- Place of birth: Glasgow, Scotland
- Position: Left winger

Team information
- Current team: Ashfield (manager)

Senior career*
Years	Team	Apps	(Gls)
1982–1984	St Mirren	0	(0)
1983	→ Hamilton Academical (loan)	7	(0)
1984–1985	Dundee	1	(0)
1985	→ East Stirlingshire (loan)	1	(0)
1985–1986	Hibernians	15	(15)
1986	Partick Thistle	3	(0)
1986–1987	Kilmarnock	15	(1)
1987	Hamilton Academical	1	(0)
1987–1989	Dumbarton	52	(12)
1989–1993	Stirling Albion	104	(9)
1992–1995	Dumbarton	33	(1)
1995–1996	East Stirlingshire	6	(0)
1996–1998	Stranraer	57	(12)
1998–1999	Albion Rovers	17	(1)
Total		297	(30)

Managerial career
- 2009–2013: Celtic (Women)
- 2015–: Ashfield
- * Club domestic league appearances and goals

Robert John Docherty (born 11 September 1965) is a Scottish former professional footballer who played as a left winger, making nearly 300 appearances in the Scottish Football League. After retiring as a player, Docherty became a coach, managing Celtic Youth Academy teams and Celtic Ladies First Team. He is the manager of Ashfield in the Scottish Junior Football Association, West Region.

== Career ==
=== Playing career ===
Born in Glasgow, Docherty began his career at St Mirren in 1982, and also played for Hamilton Academical, Dundee, East Stirlingshire, Hibernians, Partick Thistle, Kilmarnock, Dumbarton, Stirling Albion, Stranraer and Albion Rovers.

=== Coaching career ===
After working for the SFA as a youth development officer and tutor, Docherty joined Celtic in 2003. His role included Community Development Manager, Youth Academy Coach, and Head of the academy's Development Centers. In 2006, he was promoted to Head of the Celtic Foundation. Docherty introduced the Celtic Girls' Academy and Senior Teams in 2007 and was manager of the Ladies First Team from 2009 to 2013.

Docherty became manager of Junior side Ashfield in the summer of 2015.
