= Peter Caulfield (football manager) =

Scottish football manager (born 1959)

Personal information
- Date of birth: 21 December 1959 (age 66)
- Place of birth: Coatbridge, Scotland

Team information
- Current team: Glasgow City FC

Managerial career
- Years: Team
- 1997–1999: Monklands Ladies
- 1999–2010: Glasgow City FC
- 2011–2013: Celtic Women (assistant manager)
- 2013: Celtic Women
- 2016–2018: Celtic Women (assistant manager)

Peter Caulfield (born 21 December 1959) is a former Scottish football manager and coach who is now Head of Recruitment and Scouting at Glasgow City FC. He formerly spent time as manager and coach at Scottish Women's Premier League clubs Monklands Ladies, Glasgow City FC and Celtic Women.

Following spells coaching in boys football and the men's amateur game, he accepted an offer from Monklands Ladies to become Manager and guided them in his first season to the 1997–98 Scottish 1st Division West title, with a 100% win record, and into the Scottish Women's Premier League for the first time. After a single year in charge in the Premier League, where he consolidated their position, he left after an approach from Glasgow City, who themselves had just been promoted to the Premier League, stating he felt Monklands Ladies were unable to match his ambitions.

Caulfield joined Celtic in February 2011 following his surprise departure from Glasgow City where he spent 11 years in charge, winning five Scottish Women's Premier League titles, three Scottish Cups and two Premier League cups. He was appointed manager at Celtic in January 2013 following two years spent as assistant manager to Robert Docherty.

He resigned from Celtic on 25 July 2013, only five months into his first season in charge of the team. In a statement, the club cited "work and family reasons" for his departure.

In September 2016, Caulfield rejoined Celtic once again as assistant manager.

== Playing career ==
Caulfield's playing career in the Scottish Junior ranks was curtailed by a broken leg.

== Glasgow City ==
Caulfield was appointed manager of Glasgow City after they won the 1998–99 Scottish Women's 1st Division West title, in their inaugural year in women's football, and remained in charge until his departure in December 2010.

During his tenure, Caulfield led Glasgow City to five Premier League titles, three Scottish Women's Cup wins and two Scottish Women's Premier League Cup wins, while also guiding his team to the last 16 of the 2008–09 UEFA Women's Cup, (The forerunner to the current UEFA Women's Champions League), becoming the first Scottish team to achieve this feat. This success in Europe, combined with winning the domestic treble in 2008–09, made Caulfield the most successful manager ever in Scottish women's football history.

At the start of the 2008–09 season, after a few years of planning, Caulfield formed a reserve team at Glasgow City, made up entirely of girls 14 to 17 years of age, and entered them into the Scottish women's senior leagues – Second Division West. He watched them win all 20 league games on the way to winning the title and promotion to the Scottish Women's First Division.

Amazingly the team also won the Scottish Women's Football League Cup, in November 2008, which comprised teams from all three regional second divisions, together with the 12 Scottish Women's First Division clubs. When the team lifted the trophy, beating Celtic's reserve side 3–0, in the final at Lesser Hampden, they became the youngest team to lift the trophy as well as the only Second Division club to do so.

This success meant midfielder Emma Mitchell became the youngest captain to lift the trophy at only 16 years and two months, while defender Atlanta Gray became the youngest player ever to win silverware at this level, at only 14 years and 11 months old.

== Awards ==
Caulfield picked up the inaugural Manager of the Year award in 2009, sponsored by the Scottish Sun newspaper, when he lifted the prize at the first ever Scottish Women's Football awards night at Hampden Park.
