= Rhonda Jones =

Scottish footballer (born 1979)

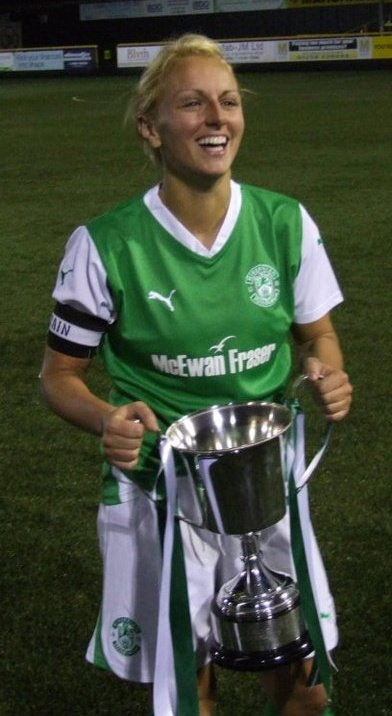

Personal information
- Date of birth: 30 March 1979 (age 47)
- Place of birth: Newarthill, Scotland
- Height: 5 ft 5 in (1.65 m)
- Position: Defender

Youth career
- Motherwell Rovers

College career
Years	Team	Apps	(Gls)
2000–2004	Florida Atlantic Owls		

Senior career*
Years	Team	Apps	(Gls)
1996–2000	Ayr United Ladies		
2005	Central Florida Krush		
2006	Cocoa Expos		
2008	Tampa Bay Hellenic		
2008–2011	Hibernian Ladies		
2011	Doncaster Rovers Belles	6	(0)
2011–2015	Celtic	38	(6)
2015–2016	Glasgow City		
2016	Rangers		

International career
1998–2013	Scotland	117	(4)
- * Club domestic league appearances and goals

Rhonda Jones (born 30 March 1979) is a retired Scottish footballer who played as a defender and won over 100 caps for the Scotland national team. A right-back or central defender, Jones played for Tampa Bay Hellenic in the United States. She then captained Hibernian Ladies and played for English FA WSL club Doncaster Rovers Belles, before returning to Scotland for spells with Celtic, Glasgow City and Rangers.

== Club career ==
Jones played youth football with Motherwell Rovers then joined Ayr United Ladies at 16. In five years at Ayr, Jones won various Player of the Year awards, including SWPL Player of the Year, as well as the Scottish Cup in 1999. At the age of 21 Jones won a scholarship to Florida Atlantic University and competed for the Division 1 soccer team while completing a degree in graphic design. She became the most decorated athlete in the history of FAU's women's soccer program and won a place in the University Athlete Hall of Fame in 2009.

At the culmination of her studies Jones remained in America and played for semi-professional W-League clubs Central Florida Krush, Cocoa Expos and Tampa Bay Hellenic. She returned home to sign for Hibernian Ladies in September 2008, and captained the club to their 2010 Scottish Cup final win at Recreation Park. In May 2011 Jones appeared as a second–half substitute in Hibernian's 5–2 Scottish Women's Premier League Cup final win over Spartans.

Scottish coach John Buckley signed Jones for Doncaster Rovers Belles in July 2011, for the second half of the 2011 FA WSL season.

Jones joined Celtic for the 2012 season. She then signed for Glasgow City in January 2015 before joining Rangers prior to the 2016 season. She retired from football in November 2016.

== International career ==
Jim Fleeting called Jones into the senior Scotland squad at the age of 18, after spotting her playing for Ayr United. She made her debut against Estonia at Somerset Park in May 1998. In the semi-final of the Albena Cup in April 1999, she scored Scotland's equalising goal against North Korea. Jones did not play for Scotland for four years while at University in America, but scored on her return to the team in September 2004. She headed in Suzanne Grant's corner in the last minute to give Scotland a 3–2 EURO 2005 qualifying win over Czech Republic at Victoria Park, Dingwall.

Jones reached the milestone of fifty caps for Scotland in a UEFA Women's Euro 2009 qualifying tie against Denmark at McDiarmid Park, Perth in October 2007.

In December 2011 Jones was one of four Celtic F.C. Women players to be approached about playing for Team GB at the 2012 Olympics.

With Scotland 1–0 down to Republic of Ireland in their April 2012 EURO 2013 qualifier at Tynecastle Stadium, Jones scored a late equaliser as the Scots came back to win 2–1. The following month she made her 100th senior appearance for Scotland, in a 3–1 friendly win over Poland in Gdańsk.

=== International goals ===
Scores and results list Scotland's goal tally first.

#	Date	Venue	Opponent	Result	Competition	Scored
1	17 April 1999	Varna	North Korea	1–1	Albena Cup	1
2	5 September 2004	Victoria Park, Dingwall	Czech Republic	3–2	UEFA Women's Euro 2005 qualifying	1
3	5 April 2012	Tynecastle Park, Edinburgh	Republic of Ireland	2–1	UEFA Women's Euro 2013 qualifying	1
4	11 March 2013	GSZ Stadium, Larnaca	Italy	2–1	2013 Cyprus Women's Cup	1

== Outside football ==
Jones was employed as a sport development officer at Grangemouth Stadium and lived in her hometown of Newarthill. Having also worked in graphic design and childcare during her playing career, she became a full-time firefighter with the Scottish Fire and Rescue Service after retiring from football.

== See also ==
- List of women's footballers with 100 or more international caps
- Scottish FA Women's International Roll of Honour
