= Eddie Wolecki Black =

Scottish footballer and manager

Eddie Wolecki
Personal information
- Full name: Edward Wolecki Black
- Date of birth: 13 March 1965 (age 61)
- Place of birth: Dundee, Scotland
- Position: Forward

Senior career*
Years	Team	Apps	(Gls)
1986–1990	Dundee St Joseph's		
1991–1992	Montrose	16	(1)
1992–1993	Deveronvale		
1993–1994	Montrose	15	(3)
1994	Deveronvale		

Managerial career
- 2005: Lochee United
- 2005–2006: Montrose
- 2011–2015: Glasgow City
- 2015: Edusport Academy
- 2015–2016: Airdrieonians
- 2017–2018: Motherwell Ladies
- 2018–2019: Celtic Women
- 2020–2021: Motherwell Women
- 2021–2022: Tayport
- 2023–2023: Forfar West End
- 2024–2024: Lossiemouth
- 2025–: Fife Thistle AFC
- * Club domestic league appearances and goals

Edward Wolecki Black (born 13 March 1965) is a Scottish football player and manager. He was director of football at West of Scotland Football League club Gartcairn Juniors and has also previously managed Forfar West End, Lochee United, Montrose, Edusport Academy and Airdrieonians in men's football, and women's teams Glasgow City, Motherwell and Celtic.

== Playing career ==
Wolecki was a player in the lower leagues of Scottish football, before becoming a coach at Dundee United under the management of both Jim McLean and Tommy McLean.

== Management career ==
After coaching stints with Brechin City and Arbroath, Wolecki became manager of Lochee United. Wolecki guided Lochee to the east super league title and theScottish Junior Cup Final in 2005, which they lost to Tayport.

He was appointed manager of Montrose in December 2005, but David Robertson was then brought in as co-manager in June 2006. Wolecki was unhappy with this arrangement and left the club in September 2006 after agreeing a settlement with the club.

Wolecki joined women's club Glasgow City as coach for the start of the 2007–08 season. He was later appointed to a full-time position with Glasgow City, becoming the first salaried coach of a women's football team in Scotland. Wolecki took sole charge of football affairs at City at the start of the 2011 season, when former manager Peter Caulfield refused an upstairs role. Caulfield subsequently joined rivals Celtic.

Wolecki left Glasgow City in July 2015, having guided the team to eight consecutive league championships and on the brink of a ninth title. After a brief spell at Edusport Academy, he joined Airdrieonians as the Youth Academy Director of Coaching in September 2015. After Gary Bollan left the club in December 2015, Wolecki was appointed head coach of Airdrieonians. He suffered a stroke in March 2016, having fallen ill during a match between Airdrie and Cowdenbeath. Danny Lennon was appointed acting head coach at Airdrieonians until the end of the 2015–16 season.

For the 2016–17 season, Kevin McBride was promoted to first team coach with Wolecki Black making a "staged return to work". However, in October 2016 both Wolecki Black and McBride left the Excelsior Stadium, with the Airdrie board looking to progress with a "more formal structured footing". During November 2016 it was announced in the press that Wolecki Black would be suing former club Airdrie for loss of income.

Wolecki Black returned to management in November 2017 when he was appointed manager of Motherwell Ladies. He moved to a similar position with Celtic Women in July 2018. After just one season at Celtic, Wolecki Black then made a return to Motherwell ahead of the 2020 season. He left again in March 2021, to concentrate on a degree course, but within days was appointed as director of football at West of Scotland League club Gartcairn Juniors, with performance responsibility for their men's, women's, youth and academy teams.

In May 2024 Wolecki Black took over as manager of Lossiemouth F.C.Lossiemouth, marking a return to the Highland League after being a player in this league during the 1990s at Deveronvale and Huntly. However his tenure at Lossiemouth was short-lived and he left the club by mutual consent on 29 August 2024 after a disappointing start to the season.

== Personal life ==
Wolecki Black is married to former Scotland international defender Emma Fernon. They met when she was a player under him at Glasgow City.

== Managerial statistics ==
As of 28 August 2024

Team	From	To	Record				
Team	From	To	G	W	D	L	Win %
Airdrieonians	December 2015	October 2016 (Note: Recovered from a stroke following the game on 8 March 2016. Danny Lennon was appointed acting head coach from March 2016 until the end of the 2015–16 season, with Kevin McBride subsequently taking up the role until October 2016. Matches included in this table are those only which Wolecki Black took charge of, from 22 December 2015 until 8 March 2016.)	11	4	2	5	36.36
Lossiemouth	July 2024	August 2024	7	1	1	5	14.29

- No statistics as yet for other clubs.

== Managerial honours ==
Lochee United

- SJFA East Region Super League (1): 2004–05. tayside premier division champions 1999–2000. Albert Hershell trophy 2000–2001. REDWOOD LEISURE CUP 2003–2004, TAYSIDE NORTH CUP 2003–2004 SCOTTISH JUNIOR CUP RUNNERS UP 2005, SCOTTISH JUNIORS SUPER CUP RUNNERS UP 2006

Glasgow City

- Scottish Women's Premier League (8): 2007–08, 2008–09, 2009,2010, 2012, 2013, 2014, 2015
- Scottish Women's Cup (6): 2009, 2011, 2012, 2013, 2014, 2015
- Scottish Women's Premier League Cup (7): 2008–09, 2009, 2009, 2012, 2013, 2014, 2015

FORFAR WEST END

EAST REGION NORTH DIVISION champions 2006–07,

ABERTAY UNIVERSITY

Scottish league champions 2004,

MOTHERWELL WFC

swpl2 champions, 2018

CELTIC WFC

Scottish women's premier league (joint) runners up 2019
