= Alana Marshall =

Scottish footballer (born 1987)

Personal information
- Full name: Alana Alise Marshall
- Date of birth: 29 April 1987 (age 39)
- Place of birth: Grangemouth, Scotland
- Position: Left wing

Team information
- Current team: Spartans
- Number: 11

Youth career
- Falkirk Girls

Senior career*
Years	Team	Apps	(Gls)
2004–2008	Falkirk Ladies		
2008	Hibernian Ladies		
2008–2011	Boroughmuir Thistle		
2011–2013	Rangers Ladies		
2013–2016	Spartans	32	(3)
2017	Fimauto Valpolicella	7	(3)
2017–	Spartans	27	(5)

International career^{‡}
2011	Scotland	4	(0)
- * Club domestic league appearances and goals as of 01:10, 14 May 2023 (UTC) ‡ National team caps and goals as of 21:00, 23 October 2011 (UTC)

Alana Marshall (born 26 April 1987) is a Scottish female international football midfielder. She currently plays in the Scottish Women's Premier League for Spartans, having previously played for Rangers Ladies, Boroughmuir Thistle and Hibernian Ladies.

== Club career ==
Marshall came through the ranks at Falkirk Ladies.

== International career ==
Marshall was called up to a Scotland training camp for the first time in June 2009, the same week as she was named Scottish Women's Premier League Player of the Year.
