= Motherwell F.C. Women =

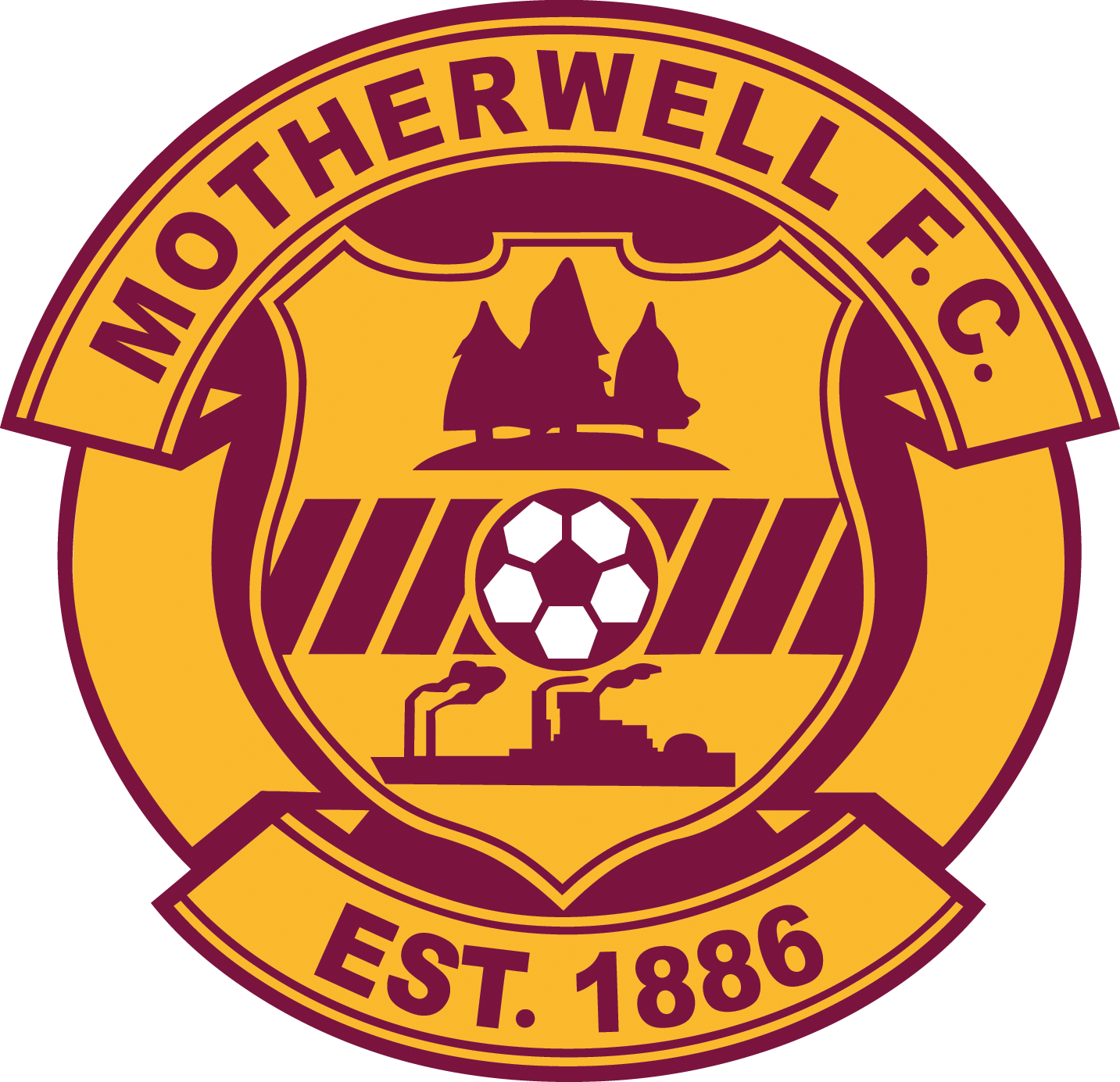
- Full name: Motherwell Football Club
- Nickname: The Women of Steel
- Founded: 2014
- Ground: K-Park Training Academy, East Kilbride
- Capacity: 660 (400 seated)
- Managers: Paul Brownlie
- League: SWPL 1
- 2025-26: SWPL 1, 7th of 12
- Website: http://www.motherwellfc.co.uk/
Home colours	Away colours

Motherwell Football Club Women is a Scottish women's football team based in Motherwell, North Lanarkshire. They are members of the Scottish Women's Premier League (SWPL) and currently compete in its top tier, SWPL1, since winning SWPL2 in 2018. For the 2020-21 season are playing their home matches at the Excelsior Stadium in Airdrie, North Lanarkshire.

Previously a separate entity known as Motherwell Ladies Football Club when the team was reformed in 2014, they became an integral part of the professional Motherwell F.C. in 2018 and dropped 'Ladies' from the name in 2019.

== History ==
Reformed in 2014, Motherwell Ladies had a fairly steady first season in the Scottish Woman's Football League 2nd Division, finishing third, but missed out on promotion as Mill United ran away with the title. The Cups were a disappointment, going out at the first stage of both competitions.

Ahead of the 2015 season, the team was able to recruit several ex International players to bolster the squad such as Julie Ferguson, Stacey Cook, Lauren MacMillan, Kirsty McBride and others. The team made an outstanding start, winning every single match during the first half of the season, scoring 176 goals in 18 matches. Including in those games was an impressive 0–4 Scottish Women's Cup win away to SWPL Hutchison Vale. In the same week, the Ladies won their first piece of silverware, beating Rangers Development side 2–6 at Spartan's Ainslie Park.

Returning from the summer break, the team picked up where they left off, beating Edinburgh South L.F.C. 21–0, with recently-signed striker Suzanne Grant netting an astonishing eleven goals on her debut, which brought about national coverage from the likes of Sky Sports. The team followed that with a brilliant comeback in the Scottish Cup Third Round against Glasgow Girls, scoring four times in the last 15 minutes to turn around a 3–0 deficit and book a Quarter Final place against Celtic.

Although an understrength team would eventually lose to Celtic in that Quarter Final, they went on to finish the season in style, securing the 2nd Division South East / West title, in an "invincibles" season, winning 18 games from 18, securing 54 points.

=== 2018 season ===
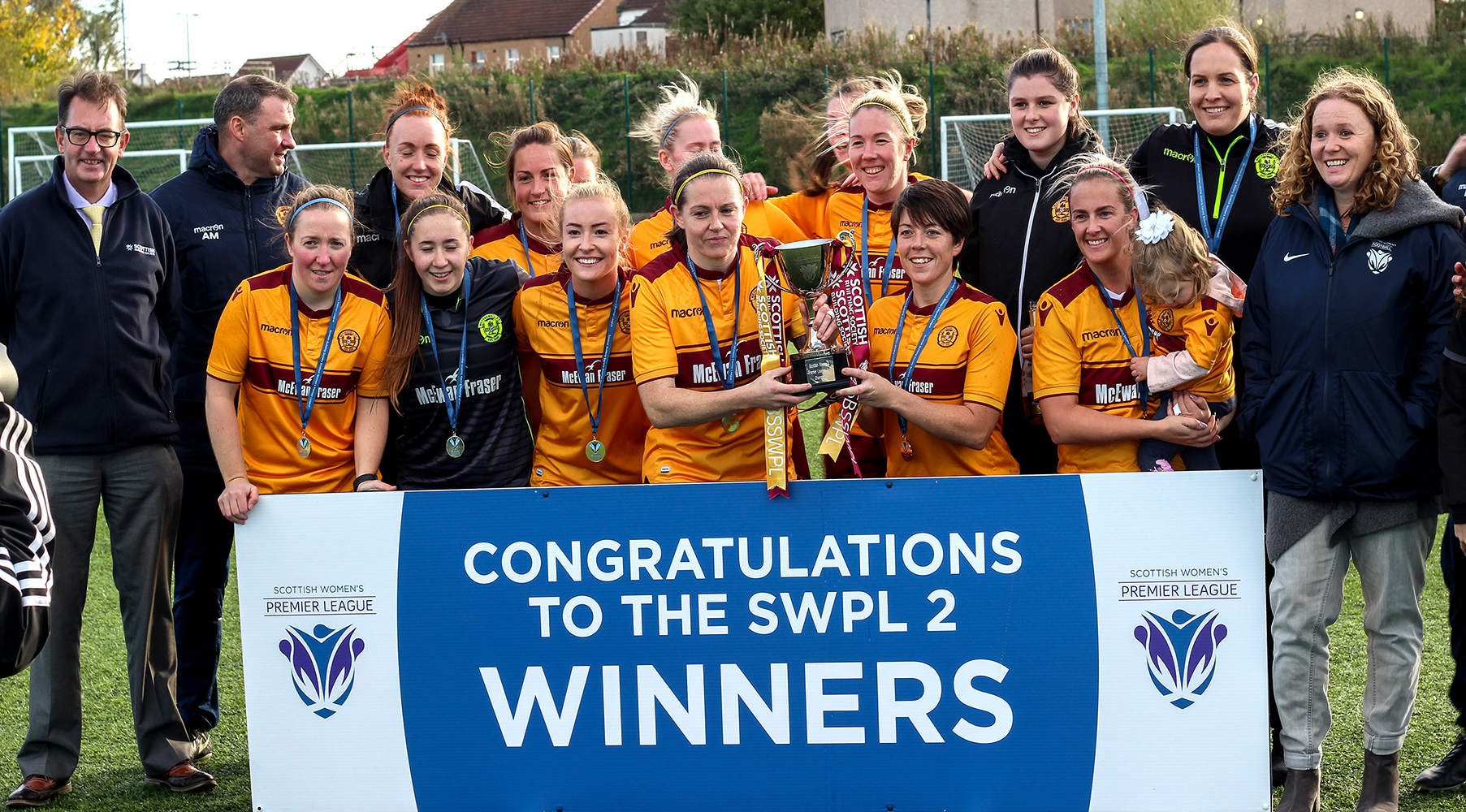
Motherwell are presented with the 2018 SWPL 2 trophy.

After a steady first season in SWPL2, former Glasgow City and Airdrie boss Eddie Wolecki Black was appointed to the role as Head Coach with the club announcing its ambition to get promoted to the top tier in Scottish football.

Eddie immediately appointed his former City staff, Assistant Donald Jennow and Goalkeeping Coach Andy Moran.

A host of signings were announced soon afterwards, with a number of players with international experience joining the club including Emma Black, Suzanne Mulvey, Megan Burns and current Northern Ireland International Kerry Montgomery.

In the team's first match of the 2018 SWPL season, Motherwell beat newly promoted F.C. Kilmarnock Ladies away from home 2-1. After the match Kilmarnock complained that Motherwell had not followed correct SWF procedures. Kilmarnock were subsequently rewarded with a 3-0 win over Motherwell. The result put Kilmarnock top of the SWPL2, albeit briefly as 'Well stormed ahead in the table.

Motherwell would secure the SWPL 2 title with five games of the season remaining, having embarked on a run of 14 wins and a draw following their opening day result being overturned.

The title win was the last act of the Wolecki Black regime, the Head Coach having left to take over the vacant managerial role at Celtic Ladies. Eddie would be replaced by Donald Jennow, who stepped up from his role as assistant to manage the team.

In addition to their league form, 'Well also reached to the final of the Scottish Women's Cup. They won over both Cumbernauld Colts and Aberdeen by 8-1, before edging out St Johnstone 1-0 in the Quarter Final at McDiarmid Park to book a Semi Final tie against Spartans at Forthbank. Goals from Burns, Montgomery and Russell handed the women a 3-1 win and secured a Scottish Cup Final appearance for the first time in 37 years, where they took on Hibernian at Firhill on Sunday, 4 November. Sadly, for 'Well, they weren't able to do the double, losing heavily in the Final in front of almost 2000 fans.

== Stadium ==
For the 2015 season, Motherwell Ladies signed an agreement to play at the John Cumming Stadium in Carluke, but just before the season was about to begin, the Astro pitch was damaged by vandals. As a result, the team played either at Braidhurst High School, Ravenscraig Regional Sports Facility or at Fir Park Stadium. For the 2020–21 season, they are groundsharing at the Excelsior Stadium in Airdrie, North Lanarkshire.

Motherwell moved to K-Park in East Kilbride for the start of the 2022–23 season.

== Current squad ==
As of 8 April 2026

Note: Flags indicate national team as defined under FIFA eligibility rules; some limited exceptions apply. Players may hold more than one non-FIFA nationality.

No.	Pos.	Nation	Player
1	GK	SCO	Rebecca Cameron
2	DF	SCO	Shannon Leishman
3	DF	SCO	Jenna Penman
4	DF	SCO	Chelsie Watson
5	DF	SCO	Joanne Addie
6	MF	SCO	Lucy Ronald
7	FW	SCO	Bailley Collins
8	MF	SCO	Katie Rice
9	FW	SCO	Carla Boyce
11	FW	NIR	Keri Halliday (on loan from Hearts)

No.	Pos.	Nation	Player
14	MF	SCO	Gillian Inglis (Captain)
16	FW	SCO	Mason Clark
17	MF	SCO	Kodie Hay
18	MF	SCO	Amy Denholm
20	FW	SCO	Sophie Townsley (on loan from Rangers)
21	MF	SCO	Mia McArthur (on loan from Rangers)
22	DF	AUS	Milly Boughton (on loan from Hibernian)
23	DF	SCO	Tegan Browning
25	GK	SCO	Emma Thomson (on loan from Hearts)
31	MF	SCO	Hannah Cairns

== Former players ==
- (Malta) Anna Vincenti

== Coaching staff ==
As of 10 May 2023

Head Women and Girls Football - Paul Brownlie

Position	Name
Head coach	(Scotland) Paul Brownlie
Assistant Head Coach	(Scotland) Colin Crichton
First Team Coach	(Scotland) Craig Slater
Goalkeeping Coach	(Scotland) Conor O'Boyle

== Achievements ==
- Scottish Women's Premier League 2
  - Winners: 2018
- Scottish Women's Cup
  - Winners: 1973–74, 1979–80, 1980–81
  - Runners-up: 2018
- SWFL Second Division Cup
  - Winners: 2015
- SWFL 2nd Division South East / West
  - Winners: 2015
