= K-Park Training Academy =

Football stadium in South Lanarkshire, Scotland

- Location within South Lanarkshire
- Location: St Leonards, East Kilbride, South Lanarkshire
- Coordinates: 55.750°N 4.147°W
- Owner: East Kilbride Community Trust
- Surface: Third Generation synthetic pitches

Construction
- Opened: May 2011

Tenants
- East Kilbride F.C. (2011–present); Celtic F.C. Women (2015–2021); Motherwell F.C. Women (2023–present)

K-Park Training Academy, currently known as The Bumblebee Stadium for sponsorship reasons, is a stadium and training ground for football in the St Leonards area of East Kilbride in South Lanarkshire. It is located within the site of Calderglen Country Park. It is the home ground of League One club East Kilbride.

== History ==
K-Park was opened in May 2011 by the East Kilbride Community Trust (EKCT), who had previously drawn up plans that would give the large town a top-quality, UEFA-standard sports facility. Former Rangers and Scotland footballer Ally McCoist, who is from East Kilbride, officially opened the first phase of the new facility on 25 September 2011.

K-Park is used as the home ground for the newly formed football club East Kilbride F.C., who were founded in 2010, one year before the facility's official opening. They will play their first league matches at the venue before relocating to a proposed site near Langlands Golf Course. The local rugby team East Kilbride RFC also train at the facility. K-Park was the home of Celtic Women from March 2015 until July 2021.

== Structure and facilities ==
It is mainly Third Generation synthetic football pitches that are at the facility, used by local clubs and clubs from the Scottish Football League. The parks are also easily convertible for rugby training.

The pitches at K-Park (of which there is one 11-a-side pitch and two 7-a-sides) are unusual, in that they consist of a mixture of quartz sand and rubber granules. This is to reduce the likelihood of an injury sustained or lower the impact of a fall, as well as allowing better ball control for the players that use the facility.
