= 2009 Scottish Women's Premier League =

Scottish Women's Premier League
- Season: 2009
- Champions: Glasgow City (4th title)
- Champions League: Glasgow City
- Matches: 66
- Biggest home win: Celtic 21–0 FC Kilmarnock
- Biggest away win: Inverness City 0–12 Glasgow City
- Highest scoring: Celtic 21–0 FC Kilmarnock
- Longest winning run: Glasgow City, 11 (9 August – 22 November)
- Longest unbeaten run: Glasgow City, 11 (9 August – 22 November)
- Longest winless run: FC Kilmarnock, 7 (9 August – 11 October)
- Longest losing run: FC Kilmarnock, 7 (9 August – 11 October)

The 2009 Scottish Women's Premier League was the eighth season of the Scottish Women's Premier League, the top level of women's football in Scotland. 12 teams contested the championship, with Rangers and Inverness City, winners and runners-up respectively in the 2008–09 SWFL First Division, taking the place of relegated Raith Rovers and boosting the numbers from the 11 teams that took part in the previous season. Rangers, formed only a year earlier, were making their first appearance in the top tier. It was decided that the SWPL would change from a winter to a summer schedule, so the 2009 season was a transitional, shortened campaign with only one round of fixtures, it was determined that no promotion or relegation would take place, although a championship title was still awarded. Matches were played between August and November.

Glasgow City won the championship with a perfect record (11 victories, 0 draw, 0 defeats) and qualified for the 2010–11 UEFA Women's Champions League. It was their third consecutive title, and fourth overall. No teams were relegated.

== League standings ==
Pos	Team	Pld	W	D	L	GF	GA	GD	Pts	Qualification
1	Glasgow City (C)	11	11	0	0	71	5	+66	33	2010–11 Champions League
2	Celtic	11	9	1	1	64	5	+59	28	
3	Spartans	11	8	1	2	26	16	+10	25	
4	Hibernian	11	7	2	2	33	14	+19	23	
5	Forfar Farmington	11	6	1	4	18	29	−11	19	
6	Hamilton Academical	11	5	1	5	22	27	−5	16	
7	Rangers	11	4	0	7	20	27	−7	12	
8	Dundee United SC	11	3	1	7	16	29	−13	10	
9	Boroughmuir Thistle	11	2	2	7	13	32	−19	8	
10	Aberdeen	11	1	3	7	16	33	−17	6	
11	Inverness City	11	2	0	9	10	35	−25	6	
12	FC Kilmarnock	11	2	0	9	13	70	−57	6	

Rules for classification: 1) Points; 2) Goal difference; 3) Number of goals scored
(C) Champions
