= Scottish Women's Premier League Cup =

- Organiser(s): Scottish Women's Premier League
- Founded: 2002
- Region: Scotland
- Teams: 20
- Current champions: Glasgow City (2025–26: 7th title)
- Most championships: Hibernian / Glasgow City (7 titles)
- Broadcaster: Sky Sports
- 2025–26 Scottish Women's Premier League Cup

The Scottish Women's Premier League Cup, currently known as the Sky Sports Cup due to sponsorship and commonly shortened to the SWPL Cup, is a league cup competition in women's football in Scotland. The cup is open only to the teams in the Scottish Women's Premier League. There are four rounds, including the final.

The competition was launched in 2002–03 along with the Scottish Women's Premier League, and the first winners were Kilmarnock. It supplanted the Scottish Women's Football League Cup (Kilmarnock were also its last winners) which continued as a lower-division competition.

The SWPL Cup changed to run on a summer schedule played in a single calendar year (from around March to November) from the 2009 edition until the COVID-19 pandemic ended the 2020 season prematurely (leaving that year's edition unfinished) and caused the SWPL to revert to a winter format in all competitions for the following season, which was retained after pandemic restrictions ended.

The competition has been won most often by Hibernian and Glasgow City, seven times each.

== Format ==
Up to 2015, eight of the twelve Premier League teams were drawn to play in the first round. The four winners and the other four teams then played in the quarter-finals. All matches were played over one leg.

Since the addition of the division SWPL 2 in 2016, all teams from the Premier League's two divisions have taken part in the cup. The last edition with the straight-knockout format was the 2019 Scottish Women's Premier League Cup

In a large change to the format for the 2020 edition of the Cup, a 16-team group stage was inaugurated, planned to qualify teams for the eight-team knockout phase, with the League's top two clubs given a bye to the quarter-finals; but the SWPL was abandoned early in the 2020 season, due to the COVID-19 outbreak, and the League reverted to the winter format as a result. The league cup was not played in the 2020–21 season. The group phase was played with all clubs in the 2021–22 SWPL Cup, which was completed and won by Celtic.

A new trophy was introduced for the 2022–23 season made by Thomas Lyte, along with revamped branding and logo.

== Past winners ==
Previous finals are:

Year	Winner	Result	Runner up	Venue	Ref
2002–03	Kilmarnock	2–0	Glasgow City		
2003–04	Kilmarnock	3–1	Glasgow City		
2004–05	Hibernian	6–1	Raith Rovers	Stark's Park	
2005–06	Kilmarnock	3–2	Glasgow City	Stark's Park	
2006–07	Edinburgh	4–1	Hibernian	Broadwood Stadium	
2007–08	Hibernian	4–0	Queen's Park Ladies	Forthbank Stadium	
2008–09	Glasgow City	3–0	Spartans	Forthbank Stadium	
2009	Glasgow City	3–1	Hibernian	Recreation Park	
2010	Celtic	4–1	Spartans	Ainslie Park	
2011	Hibernian	5–2	Spartans	Recreation Park	
2012	Glasgow City	5–1	Spartans	Recreation Park	
2013	Glasgow City	5–0	Spartans	Recreation Park	
2014	Glasgow City	3–0	Hibernian	Ainslie Park	
2015	Glasgow City	2–1 (a.e.t.)	Hibernian	Ainslie Park	
2016	Hibernian	2–1	Glasgow City	Ainslie Park	
2017	Hibernian	4–1	Celtic	Broadwood Stadium	
2018	Hibernian	9–0	Celtic	Falkirk Stadium	
2019	Hibernian	0–0 (a.e.t.); 4–2 (pen.)	Glasgow City	Excelsior Stadium	
2020	Unfinished due to the COVID-19 pandemic in Scotland.				
2020–21	Not played.				
2021–22	Celtic	1–0	Glasgow City	Firhill Stadium	
2022–23	Rangers	2–0	Hibernian	Tynecastle Park	
2023–24	Rangers	4–1	Partick Thistle	Tynecastle Park	
2024–25	Rangers	5–0	Hibernian	Fir Park	
2025–26	Glasgow City	2–1	Rangers	Fir Park	

=== List of winners ===
Titles	Team
7	Hibernian
7	Glasgow City
3	Kilmarnock
3	Rangers
2	Celtic
1	Spartans (as Edinburgh)

== See also ==
- Scottish Women's Cup
- Scottish Women's Football League First Division Cup
- Scottish Women's Football League Second Division Cup
