= Glasgow City F.C. =

- Full name: Glasgow City Football Club
- Founded: 1998; 28 years ago
- Ground: Petershill Park, Springburn, Glasgow
- Capacity: 901 (496 seated)
- Co-founders: Carol-Anne Stewart & Laura Montgomery
- Head Coach: Leanne Ross
- League: SWPL 1
- 2025-26: SWPL 1, 3rd of 12
- Website: glasgowcityfc.co.uk
Home colours	Away colours

Glasgow City Football Club is a professional women's football team based in Glasgow that plays in SWPL 1, the top division of football in Scotland and also the higher of two levels of the Scottish Women's Premier League. The club has competed in the UEFA Women's Cup and UEFA Women's Champions League. They also have a reserve team and youth teams.

Glasgow City has won the most Premier League titles and the most Scottish Cups in Scotland since 2000.

In 2016, Glasgow City won their tenth Scottish Women's Premier League title in a row. However they lost their four-year monopoly on the domestic trophies with Hibernian L.F.C. winning the SWPL Cup and Scottish Cup.

The club's most recent title success came in dramatic fashion at the conclusion of the 2022–23 season with Glasgow City, Rangers, and Celtic all going into the final day with an opportunity to claim the title. At Ibrox Stadium, an injury time goal from City's Lauren Davidson secured a 16th SWPL title and made Leanne Ross the first female head coach to win the championship.

== History ==
Glasgow City Football Club was formed in 1998 by Laura Montgomery and Carol Anne Stewart. They play in orange and black. The club play their home matches at Petershill Park in the Springburn district in the north of Glasgow, although from 2014 to 2017 they played at the larger Excelsior Stadium in Airdrie, around 15 miles outside the city, due to issues with the artificial playing surface at Petershill. For the 2020–21 season, with Petershill unavailable, they played at Broadwood Stadium in Cumbernauld, North Lanarkshire.

City completed a domestic clean sweep in 2012, winning the treble, and they completed a second consecutive domestic treble in 2013. Between the seasons 2009 and 2018 inclusive, Glasgow City lost only three League matches, and continued an unprecedented run of successive Scottish championships that began in 2007–08 It was reported Glasgow City had held talks with the FA WSL in February 2013 about a possible move to an extended top flight in England. City cited football was not moving forward quickly enough in Scotland for women to match their ambition. The FA shut the door on any potential move. City general manager Laura Montgomery later reiterated the club's desire to play in the FA WSL.

During the 2014 season, Glasgow City secured an eighth successive SWPL title and third successive treble. After a superb 5–4 aggregate win against FC Zurich, City became the first Scottish team to reach the UEFA Champions League quarter-finals in November 2014. After a 2–1 first leg defeat at FC Zurich, City were 1–0 down at half time, with their keeper substituted due a suspected broken collar bone, in the second leg. Despite City replying with two early second half goals, Zurich made it 2–2. An 81st minute Jo Love strike leveled the tie, but with City heading out of the competition on away goals, Suzanne Lappin powered home a header a few minutes from time to send them through. In the quarter-finals, Paris Saint-Germain proved too strong for City, with a 7–0 aggregate victory.

City were seeded for the UEFA Champions League in 2015–16, as they entered straight in to the round of 32, both for the very first time. As the eighth seeds, the team faced Chelsea, only to lose 4-0 on aggregate.

In July 2015, Eddie Wolecki stepped down as Glasgow City manager after four and a half years in charge, with Scott Booth announced as his replacement.

City reached the Champions League quarter-finals for the second time in 2019–20; they were the last independent women's football club to achieve this. In the 2020–21 Scottish Women's Premier League, they won their fourteenth title in succession. Following the departure of Scott Booth in summer 2021 to take head coach role at Birmingham City W.F.C., Grant Scott was appointed as interim head coach until Eileen Gleeson was freed from her commitments as assistant coach with Republic of Ireland women's national team and could take up post as head coach in November 2021.

In December 2022, Gleeson stepped down and was replaced by the club's all-time leading appearance leader, goalscorer and former captain Leanne Ross. In Ross's first season in charge she led the side to a 16th SWPL title, claiming the title in stoppage time on the final day of the season. The 2023–24 season saw City eliminated from the knock-out rounds of the Champions League by Brann having defeated Gintra and Shelbourne in their Qualifying Round 1 Group Stage Round Robin. The season would end without any silverware.

Ahead of the 2024–25 season, former Head Coach Scott Booth was appointed as Assistant First Team Coach but he departed in November 2024 to take up the head coach role at Aberdeen, in his place former City midfielder and Scotland international Leanne Crichton was appointed. The season ended with the club finishing second in the SWPL, qualifying for the UEFA Champions League, and as runners-up in the Scottish Cup after a 3–0 defeat by Rangers in the final. Against the same opposition, City ended an 11-year wait to lift the SWPL Cup again with a 2–1 win in the 2026 final.

== Club records ==
- Record win: 29–0 against FC Kilmarnock, May 2010.
- Record defeat: 0–10 against Turbine Potsdam in the UEFA Women's Champions League, 2 November 2011.
- Most goals in all competitions: Leanne Ross, 264.
- Most league goals in a season: Leanne Ross, 42 (during the 2010 season).
- Most goals in a season: Leanne Ross, 54 (during the 2010 season).
- Most goals in a game: Debbie McWhinnie, 12 against Motherwell in the Scottish Women's Cup, February 2004.
- Highest European home attendance: 1,785 against Paris Saint-Germain, 22 March 2015.

== Honours ==
- Scottish Women's Premier League
  - Winners (16): 2004–05, 2007–08, 2008–09, 2009, 2010, 2011, 2012, 2013, 2014, 2015, 2016, 2017, 2018, 2019, 2020–21, 2022–23
- Scottish Women's Cup
  - Winners (9): 2003–04, 2005–06, 2008–09, 2011, 2012, 2013, 2014, 2015, 2019
- Scottish Women's Premier League Cup
  - Winners (7): 2008–09, 2009, 2012, 2013, 2014, 2015, 2025–26
- Scottish Women's Football First Division
  - Winners: 1998–99

=== Other tournaments ===
- National 5-A-Side
  - Winners: 1999–00, 2000–01
- Umbro Cup (Manchester)
  - Winners: 2007, 2009 (shared)
- Reebok Trophy (Mansfield)
  - Winners: 1999

== Awards ==
- Scottish Sports Awards Amateur Performance of the Year: 2011
- GCC Glasgow Team of the Year: 2008, 2011, 2013, 2014
- Glaswegian Team of the Year: 2009
- Sports Council of Glasgow Performance Team of the Year: 2010

== European history ==
Glasgow City has participated in several seasons of UEFA competitions; reaching the second qualifying round of the Women's Cup (last 16) in the 2008–09 season. In the 2011–12 UEFA Women's Champions League they won their qualifying group and moved on to the round of 32. They then defeated Icelandic team Valur to become the first Scottish side to reach the round of 16 of the Champions League. The Round of 16 ended in "humiliating" fashion for Glasgow City, where against German champions Turbine Potsdam, they lost the tie 17–0 on aggregate. At the time, the 10–0 first leg defeat in Potsdam was the only time any team in the knockout stages of the Champions League has been beaten by double figures. In 2013–14 they reached the round of 16 again, losing 2–6 against Arsenal on aggregate (the unwanted records from the Potsdam tie were eclipsed that season by Wolfsburg who won their round of 32 tie 13–0 and 14–0 for a 27–0 aggregate).

In 2014–15 they became the first Scottish team to advance to the quarterfinals, being eliminated by Paris Saint-Germain, and achieved the feat again in 2019–20 but lost 9–1 to Wolfsburg (twice previous winners and runners-up twice more) in a single-game tie played in San Sebastián due to the COVID-19 pandemic in Europe.

- Glasgow City score listed first

Season	Competition	Round	Opposition	Score		
Season	Competition	Round	Opposition	First Leg	Second Leg	Aggregate
2005–06	UEFA Women's Cup	First Qualifying Round	(Spain) Athletic Bilbao	2–6		4th
2005–06	UEFA Women's Cup	First Qualifying Round	(Netherlands) SV Saestum	0–7		4th
2005–06	UEFA Women's Cup	First Qualifying Round	(Belgium) KFC Rapide Wezemaal	1–5		4th
2008–09	UEFA Women's Cup	First Qualifying Round	(Netherlands) AZ	1–1		1st
2008–09	UEFA Women's Cup	First Qualifying Round	(Serbia) ŽFK Mašinac Niš	4–0		1st
2008–09	UEFA Women's Cup	First Qualifying Round	(Moldova) Narta Chişinău	11–0		1st
2008–09	UEFA Women's Cup	Second Qualifying Round	(Norway) Røa IL	1–6		4th
2008–09	UEFA Women's Cup	Second Qualifying Round	(Russia) Zvezda 2005 Perm	0–1		4th
2008–09	UEFA Women's Cup	Second Qualifying Round	(Germany) 1. FFC Frankfurt	1–3		4th
2009–10	UEFA Women's Champions League	Qualifying Round	(Germany) Bayern Munich	2–5		2nd
2009–10	UEFA Women's Champions League	Qualifying Round	(Lithuania) Gintra Universitetas	2–0		2nd
2009–10	UEFA Women's Champions League	Qualifying Round	(Georgia (country)) Norchi Dinamoeli	9–0		2nd
2010–11	UEFA Women's Champions League	Qualifying Round	(Northern Ireland) Crusaders Newtownabbey Strikers	8–0		2nd
2010–11	UEFA Women's Champions League	Qualifying Round	(Slovakia) Slovan Bratislava	4–0		2nd
2010–11	UEFA Women's Champions League	Qualifying Round	(Germany) Duisburg	0–4		2nd
2011–12	UEFA Women's Champions League	Qualifying Round	(Serbia) Spartak Subotica	4–0		1st
2011–12	UEFA Women's Champions League	Qualifying Round	(Malta) Mosta	8–0		1st
2011–12	UEFA Women's Champions League	Qualifying Round	(Faroe Islands) KÍ Klaksvík	5–0		1st
2011–12	UEFA Women's Champions League	Round of 32	(Iceland) Valur	1–1	3–0	4–1
2011–12	UEFA Women's Champions League	Round of 16	(Germany) Turbine Potsdam	0–10	0–7	0–17
2012–13	UEFA Women's Champions League	Qualifying Round	(Croatia) ŽNK Osijek	3–2		1st
2012–13	UEFA Women's Champions League	Qualifying Round	(Moldova) FC Noroc	11–0		1st
2012–13	UEFA Women's Champions League	Qualifying Round	(Finland) PK-35 Vantaa	1–1		1st
2012–13	UEFA Women's Champions League	Round of 32	(Denmark) Fortuna Hjørring	1–2	0–0	1–2
2013–14	UEFA Women's Champions League	Qualifying Round	(Croatia) Osijek	7–0		1st
2013–14	UEFA Women's Champions League	Qualifying Round	(Malta) Birkirkara	9–0		1st
2013–14	UEFA Women's Champions League	Qualifying Round	(Netherlands) FC Twente	2–0		1st
2013–14	UEFA Women's Champions League	Round of 32	(Belgium) Standard Liège	2–2	3–1	5–3
2013–14	UEFA Women's Champions League	Round of 16	(England) Arsenal	0–3	2–3	2–6
2014–15	UEFA Women's Champions League	Qualifying Round	(Slovakia) Union Nové Zámky	5–0		1st
2014–15	UEFA Women's Champions League	Qualifying Round	(Northern Ireland) Glentoran	1–0		1st
2014–15	UEFA Women's Champions League	Qualifying Round	(Ukraine) Zhytlobud-1 Kharkiv	4–0		1st
2014–15	UEFA Women's Champions League	Round of 32	(Poland) Medyk Konin	0–2	3–0 (a.e.t.)	3–2
2014–15	UEFA Women's Champions League	Round of 16	(Switzerland) Zürich	1–2	4–2	5–4
2014–15	UEFA Women's Champions League	Quarterfinals	(France) Paris Saint-Germain	0–2	0–5	0–7
2015–16	UEFA Women's Champions League	Round of 32	(England) Chelsea	0–1	0–3	0–4
2016–17	UEFA Women's Champions League	Round of 32	(Sweden) Eskilstuna United DFF	0–1	1–2	1–3
2017–18	UEFA Women's Champions League	Round of 32	(Kazakhstan) BIIK Kazygurt	0–3	4–1	4–4 (lost on away goals)
2018–19	UEFA Women's Champions League	Qualifying Round	(Belgium) Anderlecht	1–2		1st
2018–19	UEFA Women's Champions League	Qualifying Round	(Georgia (country)) Martve	7–0		1st
2018–19	UEFA Women's Champions League	Qualifying Round	(Poland) Górnik Łęczna	2–0		1st
2018–19	UEFA Women's Champions League	Round of 32	(Cyprus) Barcelona FA	2–0	0–1	2–1
2018–19	UEFA Women's Champions League	Round of 16	(Spain) Barcelona	0–5	0–3	0–8
2019–20	UEFA Women's Champions League	Round of 32	(Russia) Chertanovo Moscow	1–0	4–1	5–1
2019–20	UEFA Women's Champions League	Round of 16	(Denmark) Brøndby	2–0	0–2 (a.e.t.)	2–2 (won on penalties)
2019–20	UEFA Women's Champions League	Quarter-Finals	(Germany) Wolfsburg	1–9		1–9
2020–21	UEFA Women's Champions League	Qualifying Rounds	(Republic of Ireland) Peamount United	0–0 (a.e.t.) (won on penalties)		
2020–21	UEFA Women's Champions League	Qualifying Rounds	(Iceland) Valur	1–1 (a.e.t.) (won on penalties)		
2020–21	UEFA Women's Champions League	Round of 32	(Czech Republic) Sparta Prague	1–2	0–1	1–3
2021–22	UEFA Women's Champions League	QR1 semi-final	(Malta) Birkirkara	3–0		
2021–22	UEFA Women's Champions League	QR1 final	(Kazakhstan) BIIK Kazygurt	1–0		
2021–22	UEFA Women's Champions League	QR2	(Switzerland) Servette Chênois	1–1	1–2	2–3
2022–23	UEFA Women's Champions League	QR1 semi-final	(Italy) Roma	1–3		
2022–23	UEFA Women's Champions League	QR1 Third Place Play-Off	(Switzerland) Servette	0–1		
2023–24	UEFA Women's Champions League	QR1 semi-final	(Republic of Ireland) Shelbourne	2–0		
2023–24	UEFA Women's Champions League	QR1 Final	(Lithuania) Gintra	3–0		
2023–24	UEFA Women's Champions League	QR2	(Norway) Brann	0–4	0–2	0–6
2025–26	UEFA Women's Champions League	QR2 semi-final	FK Austria Wien	0–2		
2025–26	UEFA Women's Europa Cup	QR1	(Republic of Ireland) Athlone Town AFC	3–0	3–0	6–0
2025–26	UEFA Women's Europa Cup	QR2	(Denmark) HB Koge	1–2	5–3	6–5
2025–26	UEFA Women's Europa Cup	Round of 16	(Portugal) Sporting CP	1–1	1–3 (a.e.t.)	2–4

== Players ==
As of 7 July 2026

=== Current squad ===
Note: Flags indicate national team as defined under FIFA eligibility rules; some limited exceptions apply. Players may hold more than one non-FIFA nationality.

No.	Pos.	Nation	Player
2	DF	UKR	Yana Kotyk
3	DF	SCO	Amy Muir
4	DF	SCO	Hayley Lauder (Player/Assistant Coach)
5	DF	SLO	Lana Golob
6	MF	IRL	Erin McLaughlin
7	FW	SCO	Lisa Forrest
8	MF	ENG	Ruby Seaby
9	FW	SCO	Abi Harrison
10	MF	RSA	Linda Motlhalo
11	FW	IRL	Emily Whelan
14	MF	SCO	Amy Anderson
16	DF	USA	Jesi Rossman
17	DF	SCO	Lisa Evans
18	FW	IRL	Kelly Brady

No.	Pos.	Nation	Player
19	FW	UKR	Nicole Kozlova
21	FW	FIN	Sofia Määttä
22	DF	ENG	Tia Primmer
23	MF	USA	Emily Gray
24	DF	SCO	Emma Brownlie
25	GK	SCO	Erin Clachers
27	MF	ENG	Leah Lane
28	MF	JPN	Yuuka Kurosaki
29	GK	SCO	Lee Gibson
30	FW	SCO	Sophia Martin
K9	FW	SCO	Sunny

=== On Loan ===
Note: Flags indicate national team as defined under FIFA eligibility rules; some limited exceptions apply. Players may hold more than one non-FIFA nationality.

No.	Pos.	Nation	Player
35	GK	SCO	Ava Easdon (at Partick Thistle)

== Club staff ==
As of 29 May 2025

=== Corporate staff ===
Job title	Name	Notes
Chief Executive Officer	(Scotland) Laura Montgomery	Co-founder of the club and former player/captain
Co-founder	(Scotland) Carol Anne Stewart	Co-founder of the club and former player
Academy Manager	(Scotland) Sarah Crilly	Former player (2013-16)

=== Coaching staff ===
Job title	Name
Head Coach	(Scotland) Leanne Ross
Assistant First Team Coach	(Scotland) Hayley Lauder
Coach/Head of Player Development	(Scotland) Michael Gaughan
First Team Analyst	(England) Adam Woolven
Head of Goalkeeping	(Scotland) Dan Tobin

== Player of the year ==
- 2025/26 - Lee Gibson
- 2024/25 - Aleigh Gambone
- 2023/24 - Kenzie Weir
- 2022/23 - Lauren Davidson
- 2021/22 - Jenna Clark
- 2020/21 - Priscila Chinchilla / Janine Van Wyk
- 2019 - Kirsty Howat
- 2018 - Leanne Crichton
- 2017 - Abbi Grant
- 2016 - Erin Cuthbert
- 2015 - Denise O'Sullivan
- 2014 - Denise O'Sullivan
- 2013 - Suzanne Lappin
- 2012 - Jane Ross
- 2011 - Clare Gemmell
- 2010 - Suzanne Lappin
- 2009 - Katharina Lindner
- 2008 - Megan Sneddon
- 2007 - Jane Ross
- 2006 - Katharina Lindner
- 2005 - Jayne Sommerville
- 2004 - Suzanne Lappin
- 2003 - Debbie McWhinnie
- 2002 - Pauline McVey
- 2001 - Laura Montgomery
- 2000 - Susan Maxwell & Laura MacDonald (shared)
- 1999 - Kirsten Abercrombie & Fiona Laird (shared)

== Hall of Fame Inductees ==
In May 2025 Glasgow City opened their Hall of Fame. The first induction took place on Thursday 8th May 2025 at voco Grand Central Hotel in Glasgow.

- 2026 - Katharina Lindner
- 2025 - Kathleen Kimmet
- 2025 - Jo Love
- 2025 - Leanne Ross
- 2025 - Suzanne Lappin
- 2025 - Emma Fernon

== Former managers ==
- Kathleen Kimmet: 1998–1999
- Peter Caulfield: 1999–2010
- Eddie Wolecki Black: 2011–2015
- Scott Booth: 2015–2021
- Grant Scott: 2021 (interim)
- Eileen Gleeson: 2021-2022
