= Spartans W.F.C. =

Women's football team in Edinburgh, Scotland

Spartans Women
- Full name: Spartans Football Club Women's and Girl's
- Founded: 1985 (as Hailes United)
- Ground: Ainslie Park
- Capacity: 3,000 (504 seated)
- Chairman: Craig Graham
- Manager: Jack Beesley
- League: SWPL 1
- 2025-26: SWPL 2, 1st (Champions)
- Website: http://www.spartansfcwomen.com/
Home colours	Away colours

Spartans Football Club Women's and Girl's is a women's football team that plays in the SWPL 1, the second tier of football in Scotland. Spartans F.C. Women is part of Spartans F.C. in North Edinburgh and play and train at the club's training facilities.

== History ==
Founded in 1985, the club was known as Hailes United, Edinburgh Star, Tynecastle, Bonnyrigg Rose and Whitehill Welfare over the first twenty years of its existence. While operating as Whitehill Welfare the club was promoted to the Scottish Women's Premier League in 2004. After two seasons as Edinburgh Ladies in 2006–07 and 2007–08, the club came under the auspices of East of Scotland Football League club Spartans F.C. in 2008 and adopted their current name.

Having won the Scottish Women's Premier League Cup as Edinburgh Ladies in 2006–07, Spartans lost a further five League Cup finals in 2008–09, 2010, 2011, 2012 and 2013 as well as the final of the 2014 Scottish Women's Cup, all by heavy margins and at the hands of Glasgow City on four of the six occasions. They finished as Premier League runners-up behind Glasgow City in 2008–09 and 2011.

The club's 21-year spell in the top division ended in the 2024–25 season when they finished 10th of 12 teams, with three relegated as the league was restructured.

== Current squad ==
As of 16 March 2026

Note: Flags indicate national team as defined under FIFA eligibility rules; some limited exceptions apply. Players may hold more than one non-FIFA nationality.

No.	Pos.	Nation	Player
1	GK	SCO	Alicia Yates
2	DF	SCO	Chloe Hutchison
3	DF	SCO	Sarah Clelland
4	DF	SCO	Hannah Cunningham
5	DF	SCO	Robyn McCafferty (captain)
6	DF	SCO	Ronaigh Douglas
7	MF	SCO	Emily Cadell
8	MF	AUS	Emma McMurdo
9	FW	SCO	Zara Andrews
10	FW	SCO	Olivia Hurrell
11	DF	SCO	Niamh Noble
12	FW	SCO	Freya Jen Brien

No.	Pos.	Nation	Player
13	GK	ENG	Liamara Hensel-Burg
14	MF	SCO	Tegan Reynolds
15	FW	SCO	Rachel Murchie
16	MF	SCO	CaCee McKenna
17	MF	SCO	Eilidh Davies
18	FW	SCO	Izzy Young
19	FW	POL	Natalie Bandura
20	MF	SCO	Lauren McDonald
21	MF	SCO	Rachel Bathgate
22	DF	SCO	Chloe Hutchinson
24	FW	RSA	Tanna Hollis
