= Celtic F.C. Women =

Celtic FC Women
- Full name: The Celtic Football Club
- Nickname: The Ghirls
- Founded: 2007
- Ground: Kirkintilloch Community Sports Complex, Kirkintilloch
- Capacity: 302 seated
- Patron: Elaine C. Smith
- Manager: Grant Scott
- League: SWPL 1
- 2025–26: SWPL 1, 5th of 10
- Website: https://www.celticfc.com/celtic-fc-women/
Home colours	Away colours	Third colours

Celtic Football Club Women is a professional women's football team that plays in the Scottish Women's Premier League, the top division of women's football in Scotland. The team competes as Celtic FC and is normally referred to as the 'women's first team' within the club.

== History ==
For the first 120 years of its existence, Celtic only fielded male football teams. In the early 1960s, Rose Reilly was noticed by a Celtic scout who wanted to sign her, but the scout found out she was female and withdrew the offer. A women's team was established in June 2007 when Celtic took over Arsenal North L.F.C., founding a Girls and Women's Football Academy at the same time.

Celtic reached the 2008 Scottish Women's Cup final (doing so in their inaugural season, as the men's team had done 119 years earlier), losing 3–1 to Hibernian after extra time. The team's first silverware arrived two years later as Spartans were beaten 4–1 in the final of the 2010 Scottish Women's Premier League Cup.

Celtic were ejected from the 2012 Scottish Women's Cup: they had tried to force the postponement of a quarter final with Glasgow City, but the SWF did not accept Celtic's reason and instead awarded the tie to City. In August 2013, Celtic faced being thrown out of the national Cup for the second successive season, following a complaint from beaten second round opponents Forfar Farmington: Celtic won the match 5–2, but had named former player Emily Thomson as a substitute in a bid to cup-tie her for the season at her new club, rivals Glasgow City.

At the end of the 2014 season, Celtic saw an exodus of established first team players and promising young prospects, with a number of players making apparent their frustration at the lack of ambition on Celtic's part, as the club had been looking to cut back their involvement in the women's game. Having already lost players of the calibre of Leanne Crichton, Jen Beattie, Christie Murray and Joanne Love, that year the likes of Gemma Fay, Rhonda Jones, Chloe Arthur and Heather Richards also headed for the exit door, while Scotland legends like Julie Fleeting and Suzanne Grant had not committed for the following season (the latter pair did both stay on, but left in 2015).

Celtic reached their second SWPL Cup final in 2017 and their third in 2018, but were beaten by Hibernian on both occasions; the latter match at Falkirk Stadium finished 9–0, and head coach David Haley said of his beleaguered players: "I'm sure they're as embarrassed as I am". Later that month Haley stood down from first team coaching to concentrate on running the girls' academy. Former Glasgow City coach Eddie Wolecki Black was appointed from Motherwell as his replacement.

In December 2018, Celtic announced that their women's team players would be employed as full-time professionals, with the transition beginning in the 2019 season. In doing so, they became the first ever professional women's football team in Scotland. Among Wolecki Black's first three signings for the team was his wife, Emma Black. Wolecki Black left his position at the end of the 2019 season, with the club stating in January 2020 they would make further investment to bolster the team's now confirmed status as a fully professional operation.

Fran Alonso was appointed head coach in January 2020, having previously worked under Ronald Koeman at Everton and Mauricio Pochettino at Southampton. In June 2021, Celtic achieved their best showing in the SWPL to date by finishing in runners-up for the third time, but by a margin of only three points to Glasgow City. This saw them qualify for the following season's Champions League for the first time; Celtic were subsequently eliminated from the Champions League at the first qualification round, losing 2–1 to Levante. In December 2021, Celtic won the SWPL Cup by defeating Glasgow City 1–0 in the final, their first trophy since winning the same competition in 2010. Caitlin Hayes scored the winning goal with a header from a Sarah Harkes free-kick, in a match that Celtic dominated and were unlucky not to score more. This was followed by a first ever Scottish Cup victory, beating Glasgow City again, this time 3–2 after extra time.

At the end of the 2022–23 season, Celtic came close to winning their first Scottish title. In a three-way decider on the final day of the SWPL, Celtic had to defeat Hearts while hoping their rivals Rangers could hold Glasgow City to a draw at Ibrox. A Rangers victory would also have been enough for Celtic to clinch the championship, assuming they won their match by a margin larger than Rangers. With Celtic defeating Hearts 2–0 in front of a record attendance of 15,822 at Celtic Park, Glasgow City scored a 92nd-minute winner, taking the trophy away from Parkhead. The following week, Celtic claimed the Women's Scottish Cup for a second time, beating Rangers 2–0 in front of a crowd of 10,446 at Hampden Park thanks to goals from Natasha Flint and Claire O'Riordan.

Celtic won their first Scottish Women's Premier League title in the 2023–24 season in dramatic style on the last day of the campaign, when Amy Gallacher scored a 90th-minute winner to give them a 1–0 victory over Hibernian that put them level on points with Rangers but ahead of their Glasgow rivals thanks to having a superior goal difference.

== Stadium and facilities ==
Celtic had used East Kilbride's K-Park Training Academy as their home ground since 2015.

From its inception in 2007, the team trained at the newly built Lennoxtown Training Centre outside Glasgow. In 2019, Celtic announced plans to redevelop their older Barrowfield training ground near Celtic Park for use by their youth academy and the women's team, including an indoor pitch and a matchday venue, augmenting the Lennoxtown base which would continue to be used by the men's first team squad.

In July 2021, it was announced that the Women's team (as well as the men's B-team) would play the majority of their home fixtures in 2021–22 at Airdrie's Penny Cars Stadium.

In September 2024, the club announced the permanent move for the women’s team from the Albert Bartlett Stadium in Airdrie to New Douglas Park in Hamilton. This move comes after the women’s team qualified for the UEFA Women’s Champions League and their home in Airdrie did not meet the UEFA requirements. The club also explained this move is a pivotal step in the continued development of the women’s team. The move also presents a great opportunity for the club to enhance the match day experience.

For the 2026/27 season the club announced that all home matches for the season will be played at the Kirkintilloch Community Sports Complex.

== Players ==
=== Current squad ===
As of 19 August 2026

Note: Flags indicate national team as defined under FIFA eligibility rules; some limited exceptions apply. Players may hold more than one non-FIFA nationality.

No.	Pos.	Nation	Player
2	DF	IRL	Claire Walsh
3	DF	WAL	Amy Richardson
4	MF	SCO	Lisa Robertson
5	MF	SCO	Natalie Ross
6	DF	SCO	Chloe Craig
7	FW	SCO	Amy Gallacher
8	FW	SCO	Hannah Jordan
9	FW	ENG	Isabella Fisher
10	DF	ENG	Evie Rabjohn
11	FW	NIR	Casey Howe
14	MF	SCO	Shannon McGregor
15	DF	SCO	Kelly Clark (captain)
16	DF	SCO	Abi Tobin

No.	Pos.	Nation	Player
17	FW	SCO	Morgan Cross
18	DF	ENG	Hannah Luke
19	GK	SCO	Lisa Rodgers
21	DF	SCO	Addie Handley
22	DF	NIR	Fi Morgan
22	DF	SCO	Lauren Doran-Barr
25	MF	JPN	Momo Nakao
33	GK	USA	Adelaide Gay
41	MF	SCO	Clare Goldie
44	DF	ENG	Poppy Lawson
73	MF	SCO	Maria McAneny
77	MF	SCO	Chloe Arthur

=== Players on loan ===
Note: Flags indicate national team as defined under FIFA eligibility rules; some limited exceptions apply. Players may hold more than one non-FIFA nationality.

No.	Pos.	Nation	Player
46	DF	SCO	Darra Dawson
47	MF	SCO	Sienna McGoldrick

=== Player of the Year ===
Season	Name	Nationality	Ref
2015	Kelly Clark	Scotland	
2016	Mairead Fulton	Scotland	
2017	Kerry Montgomery	Northern Ireland	
2018	Natalie Ross	Scotland	
2019	Keeva Keenan	Ireland	
2022	Jacynta Galabadaarachchi	Australia	
2023	Caitlin Hayes	Ireland	
2024	Caitlin Hayes	Ireland	
2025	Shannon McGregor	Scotland	
2026	Kelly Clark	Scotland	

== Technical staff ==
Position	Name
Manager	(Scotland) Grant Scott
Assistant Manager	(Scotland) David Haley
Goalkeeping Coach	(Scotland) Scott Fox
Performance Analyst	(Scotland) Daniel Byrne
Physiotherapist	(Scotland) Katie Singer

== Achievements ==
- Scottish Women's Premier League
  - Winners: 2023–24
  - Runners-up: 2009, 2010, 2020–21, 2022–23
- Scottish Cup
  - Winners: 2021–22, 2022–23, 2025–26
  - Runners-up: 2007–08
- SWPL Cup
  - Winners: 2010, 2021–22
  - Runners-up: 2017, 2018

== European history ==
Season	Competition	Round	Opposition	Home	Away	Aggregate
2021–22	UEFA Women's Champions League	R1 semi-final	(Spain) Levante	1–2		
2021–22	UEFA Women's Champions League	R1 third-place play-off	(Belarus) FC Minsk	2–3 (Note: Lost after extra time)		
2023–24	UEFA Women's Champions League	R1 semi-final	(Denmark) Brøndby	1–0		
2023–24	UEFA Women's Champions League	R1 final	(Norway) Vålerenga	2–2 (Note: Lost on penalties)		
2024–25	UEFA Women's Champions League	R1 semi-final	(Finland) KuPS	3–1 (Note: Won after extra time)		
2024–25	UEFA Women's Champions League	R1 final	(Lithuania) Gintra	2–0		
2024–25	UEFA Women's Champions League	R2	(Ukraine) Vorksla Poltava	2–0	1–0^{f}	3–0
2024–25	UEFA Women's Champions League	Group stage	(England) Chelsea	1–2	3–0	N/A
2024–25	UEFA Women's Champions League	Group stage	(Spain) Real Madrid	0–3	4–0	N/A
2024–25	UEFA Women's Champions League	Group stage	(Netherlands) Twente	0–2	3–0	N/A

^{f} First leg.

== Managers ==
Former Dundee United player John Holt was the team's manager in their inaugural 2007–08 campaign. Robert Docherty took charge between 2008 and 2012 and was succeeded by Peter Caulfield, who spent six months in position. David Haley was then head coach for five years until stepping down in 2018 to head the club's women's academy. Edward Gallagher, the Girls' Academy Manager was then appointed Interim 1st Team Manager. He was replaced by former Glasgow City manager Eddie Wolecki Black, who left 18 months later.

Fran Alonso became the first person to manage a full-time Celtic Women team and led the team through a transformation. Celtic won the Scottish Cup twice, the League Cup once were SWPL runners-up twice under Alonso.

In January 2024, Elena Sadiku became the head coach of Celtic. She went on to coach the team to their first-ever SWPL title, won on the final day against Hibs. Sadiku was replaced by Grant Scott in December 2025.

- John Holt: 2007–2008
- Robert Docherty: 2008–2012
- Peter Caulfield: 2013
- David Haley: 2013–2018
- Edward Gallagher (Interim): 2018
- Eddie Wolecki Black: 2018–2019
- Fran Alonso: January 2020–December 2023
- Elena Sadiku: January 2024–December 2025
- Grant Scott: December 2025–present

== See also ==
- Old Firm#Women's football
