= 2011 Scottish Women's Premier League Cup =

Tournament details
- Country: Scotland
- Teams: 12

Final positions
- Champions: Hibernian
- Runners-up: Spartans

Tournament statistics
- Matches played: 11
- Goals scored: 57 (5.18 per match)
- All statistics correct as of 28 October 2022.

The 2011 Scottish Women's Premier League Cup was the 10th edition of the SWPL Cup competition, which began in 2002. The competition was to be contested by all 12 teams of the Scottish Women's Premier League (SWPL

== First round ==
11 March 2011	Glasgow City	8–0	Celtic	Glasgow
14:00	L. Ross 24'; Corsie 31' 85'; Mitchell 37' 50' 54'; Evans 60'; J. Ross 80'			Stadium: Petershill Park

11 March 2011	Spartans	3–2	Forfar Farmington	Edinburgh
14:00	Barry 41' 76' 81'		Scott 28'; N. Davidson 67'	Stadium: Spartans Community Football Academy

11 March 2011	Inverness City	2–5	Hamilton Academical	Inverness
14:00	K. Deans 19'; L. Mackenzie 79'		Crilly 10' 58'; H. Templeton 24' 89'; A. McDonald 69'	Stadium: Millburn Academy

11 March 2011	Falkirk	0–6	Rangers	Denny
14:00 pm			L. Clark 4'; Clelland 39'; C. Docherty 45' 52'; N. Docherty 47'; J. Callaghan 86'	Stadium: Westfield Park

== Quarter-finals ==
Dundee United forfeited their match against Hibernian with the latter receiving a bye into the next round.

17 April 2011	Glasgow City	10–0	FC Kilmarnock Ladies	Glasgow
12:00	Evans 30'; C. Barnes 42'; L. Ross 47' 51' 72'; Fernon 61' 75' 90'; Murray 68'; McSorley 90'			Stadium: Petershill Park

17 April 2011	Hutchison Vale	1–4	Spartans	Edinburgh
14:00	L. Gavin 42'		Lauder 12' 35' 52'; Barry 63'	Stadium: Saughton Sports Complex

17 April 2011	Dundee United	w/o	Hibernian	Dundee
14:00				Stadium: Downfield Park

27 April 2011	Rangers	3–0	Hamilton Academical	Glasgow
14:00	Goal			Stadium: Petershill Park

== Semi-finals ==
4 May 2011	Hibernian	2–1 (a.e.t.)	Glasgow City	Linlithgow
19:30	Dempster 83' 98'		Ross 13'	Stadium: Prestonfield

5 May 2011	Spartans	2–1	Rangers	Edinburgh
19:30	K. McLaughlin 8'; K. Hamilton 89'		J. Callaghan 81'	Stadium: Spartans Community Football Academy

== Final ==
11 May 2011
19.30 pm

Hibernian	5–2	Spartans
J. Ross 21' 31'; Thomson 28'; Crichton 29'; McWhinnie 82'		Lauder 3'; K. McLaughlin 68'

Recreation Park, Alloa

Hibernian	Spartans

(Scotland) Shannon Lynn
(Scotland) Suzanne Robertson (c)
(Scotland) Lisa Robertson
(Scotland) Joelle Murray (substituted off) 55'
(Scotland) Hollie Thomson
(Scotland) Leanne Crichton
(Scotland) Jenna Ross
(Scotland) Debbie McWhinnie
(Scotland) Rebecca Dempster
(Scotland) Claire Emslie (substituted off) 76'
(Scotland) Rebecca Zoltie (substituted off) 87'
Substitutes:
(Scotland) Stefanie Malcolm (substituted on) 87'
(Scotland) Rhonda Jones (substituted on) 55'
(Scotland) Natalie Ross
(Scotland) Laura Kennedy
(Scotland) Ellen Pia (substituted on) 76'
Head coach:
(Scotland) Willie Kirk

(Scotland) Joanna Hutcheson
(Scotland) Siobhan Rooney
(Scotland) Louise Magilton
(Scotland) Claire Crosbie
(Scotland) Kirsty McLaughlin
(Scotland) Stacey McLean
(Scotland) Kristy Scott (substituted off) 56'
(Scotland) Louise Young (c) (substituted off) 64'
(Scotland) Bobbie Beveridge
(Scotland) Hayley Lauder
(Scotland) Diana Barry (substituted off) 83'
Substitutes:
(Scotland) Rachel Harrison
(Scotland) Ashley Nicolson
(Scotland) Molly McKean
(Scotland) Trisha McLaughlin
(Scotland) Sarah Ewens (substituted on) 83'
(Scotland) Louise Mason (substituted on) 56'
(Scotland) Louise Moultray (substituted on) 64'
Manager:
(Scotland) Debbi McCulloch
