= 2012 Scottish Women's Premier League Cup =

Tournament details
- Country: Scotland
- Teams: 12

Final positions
- Champions: Glasgow City
- Runners-up: Spartans

Tournament statistics
- Matches played: 11
- Goals scored: 52 (4.73 per match)
- All statistics correct as of 28 October 2022.

The 2012 Scottish Women's Premier League Cup was the 11th edition of the SWPL Cup competition, which began in 2002. The competition was to be contested by all 12 teams of the Scottish Women's Premier League (SWPL

== First round ==
| 11 March 2012 | Kilmarnock | 0–10 | Glasgow City | Hurlford |
| 12:00 | | | J. Melrose 14' 44'; Love 19' 24'; J. Ross 30' 47' 62'; C. Barnes 42'; McSorley 76'; L. Ross 79' | Stadium: Blair Park |

| 11 March 2012 | Celtic | 1–0 | Hibernian | Lennoxtown |
| 14:00 | Richards 45' | | | Stadium: Lennoxtown Training Centre |

| 11 March 2012 | Rangers | 8–1 | Falkirk | Glasgow |
| 14:00 | J. Callaghan 6' 10' 26' 73'; A. Marshall 36'; S. Knox 42'; K. McLaughlin 62'; C. Gallagher 75' | | S. McLeod 18' | Stadium: Petershill Park |

| 11 March 2012 | Hutchison Vale | 1–3 | Aberdeen | Edinburgh |
| 14.00 pm | L. Dunn 71' | | A. Ross 22' 25'; C. Anderson 40' | Stadium: Saughton Sports Complex |

== Quarter-finals ==
| 12 April 2012 | Spartans | 2–1 | Inverness City | Edinburgh |
| 13:00 | Ewens 20' 80' | | K. Mason 12' | Stadium: Spartans Community Football Academy |

| 12 April 2012 | Glasgow City | 7–0 | Aberdeen | Glasgow |
| 14:00 | J. Ross 9' 26' 78'; L. Ross 21' 56' 65'; C. Barnes 84' | | | Stadium: Toryglen Regional Football Centre |

| 12 April 2012 | Hamilton Academical | 1–2 | Forfar Farmington | Carluke |
| 14:15 | S. Fairlie 20' | | N. Davidson 54'; Grant 80' | Stadium: The John Cumming Stadium |

| 12 April 2012 | Rangers | 1–3 | Celtic | Glasgow |
| 14:00 | J. Condie 85' | | C. Craig; Grant 42'; Thomson 61' | Stadium: Petershill Park |

== Semi-finals ==
| 3 May 2012 | Forfar Farmington | 0–4 | Glasgow City | Hill of Beath |
| 19:30 | | | Evans 4'; L.Ross 55'; McSorley 60'; J. Ross 64' | Stadium: Keirs Park |

| 2 May 2012 | Spartans | 1–0 | Celtic | Linlithgow |
| 19:30 | Ewens 5' | | | Stadium: Prestonfield |

== Final ==
12 May 2012
19:30

| Glasgow City | 5–1 | Spartans |
|---|---|---|
| J. Ross 8'; D. Dalziel 23'; Mitchell 33'; L. Ross 38' 59' | | Clleland 63' |

Indodrill Stadium, Alloa
Referee: Lorraine Clark

| Glasgow City | Spartans |

| (Scotland) Claire Johnstone |
| (Scotland) Rachel Corsie |
| (Scotland) Eilish McSorley |
| (Scotland) Nicola Docherty |
| (Scotland) Emma Mitchell (substituted off) 80' |
| (Scotland) Joanne Love (substituted off) 80' |
| (Scotland) Leanne Crichton |
| (Scotland) Leanne Ross (c) |
| (Scotland) Jane Ross |
| (Scotland) Lisa Evans (substituted off) 80' |
| (Scotland) Danica Dalziel |
Substitutes:
| (Scotland) Ciara Barnes (substituted on) 80' |
| (Scotland) Julie Melrose (substituted on) 80' |
| (Scotland) Amy McDonald |
| (Scotland) Christie Murray |
| (Germany) Katharina Lindner (substituted on) 80' |
Head coach:
(Scotland) Eddie Wolecki Black

| (Scotland) Rachel Harrison |
| (Scotland) Claire Crosbie |
| (Scotland) Louise Mason (substituted off) 70' |
| (Scotland) Chloe Fitzpatrick |
| (Scotland) Bobbie Beveridge |
| (Scotland) Victoria Farquhar |
| (Scotland) Louise Young (c) (substituted off) 57' |
| (Scotland) Sarah Ewens (substituted off) 60' |
| (Scotland) Molly McKean |
| (Scotland) Lana Clelland |
| (Scotland) Diana Barry |
Substitutes:
| (Scotland) Joanna Hutcheson |
| (Scotland) Louise Magilton (substituted on) 60' |
| (Scotland) Danni Pagliarulo (substituted on) 57' |
| (Scotland) Trisha McLaughlin (substituted on) 70' |
| (Scotland) Nichola Sturrock |
| (Finland) Heli Hakkinen |
| (Scotland) Louise Moultray |
Manager:
(Scotland) Debbi McCulloch
