= 2011 Scottish Women's Premier League =

Scottish Women's Premier League
- Season: 2011
- Champions: Glasgow City (6th title)
- Relegated: Dundee United SC (withdrew); Boroughmuir Thistle (folded)
- Champions League: Glasgow City
- Matches: 110
- Goals: 606 (5.51 per match)
- Biggest home win: Hibernian 14–0 Falkirk; 30 August 2011
- Biggest away win: Kilmarnock 0–15 Celtic; 8 May 2011
- Highest scoring: Kilmarnock 0–15 Celtic; 8 May 2011

The 2011 Women's Premier League was the tenth season of the Scottish Women's Premier League. A total of eleven teams contested the division. It was played as a double round-robin in 2011.

Celtic Reserves had won the 2010 Scottish Women's First Division, but were unable to be promoted as league rules stipulate each club may field only one team in the Premier League. Thus Hutchison Vale, as second-place finishers, were promoted to replace relegated Aberdeen. Dundee United Sports Club and Boroughmuir Thistle resigned from the league before the season commenced, resulting in Falkirk being offered promotion in February 2011.

On the 17th matchday, Glasgow City secured their fifth straight Scottish title, Spartans finished as runners-up. and went on to complete a perfect season of 20 victories. Glasgow City also won the 2011 Scottish Women's Cup to complete the 'double'.

Owing to a lack of clubs eligible to be promoted, F.C. Kilmarnock Ladies were spared relegation and competed in the Premier League in 2012.

== Teams ==
=== Stadia and locations ===
Locations of teams in the 2011 Premier League

The most regular home ground is shown though many clubs played matches at other venues throughout the season.

Team	Location	Home ground	Finishing position 2010
Celtic	Glasgow	Lennoxtown	2nd
Falkirk	Falkirk	Westfield Park, Denny	SWFL First Division, 3rd
Forfar Farmington	Forfar	Strathmore Park	5th
Glasgow City	Glasgow	Petershill Park	1st
Hamilton Academical	Hamilton	John Cumming Stadium, Carluke	6th
Hibernian	Edinburgh	Albyn Park, Broxburn	4th
Hutchison Vale	Edinburgh	Saughton Enclosure	SWFL First Division, 2nd
Inverness City	Inverness	Bught Park	7th
FC Kilmarnock Ladies	Kilmarnock	Blair Park, Hurlford	11th
Rangers	Glasgow	Petershill Park	8th
Spartans	Edinburgh	Spartans Academy	3rd

== League standings ==
FC Kilmarnock Ladies fielded an ineligible player in their 2–0 victory over Falkirk on 26 June 2011. The result was annulled and a 3–0 win awarded to Falkirk.

Pos	Team	Pld	W	D	L	GF	GA	GD	Pts	Qualification
1	Glasgow City (C, Q)	20	20	0	0	136	6	+130	60	2012–13 Champions League
2	Spartans	20	14	3	3	84	37	+47	45	
3	Hibernian	20	13	3	4	80	25	+55	42	
4	Celtic	20	13	2	5	79	24	+55	41	
5	Forfar Farmington	20	13	1	6	32	26	+6	40	
6	Hamilton Academical	20	8	3	9	56	43	+13	27	
7	Rangers	20	7	5	8	51	50	+1	26	
8	Inverness City	20	5	2	13	24	82	−58	17	
9	Hutchison Vale	20	5	1	14	41	67	−26	16	
10	Falkirk	20	2	0	18	13	114	−101	6	
11	FC Kilmarnock Ladies	20	0	0	20	10	132	−122	0	

Source: Scottish Women's FA
Rules for classification: 1) Points; 2) Goal difference; 3) Number of goals scored
(C) Champions; (Q) Qualified for the phase indicated

== Statistics ==
=== Results ===
Home \ Away	CEL	FAL	KLM	FFM	GLC	HAM	HIB	HUT	INV	RAN	SPA
Celtic		8–0	7–0	5–0	0–5	2–1	0–0	4–0	5–0	3–0	1–2
Falkirk	0–11		3–0	0–1	0–13	1–4	2–3	0–3	2–3	0–4	1–6
FC Kilmarnock Ladies	0–15	1–3		1–2	0–12	0–4	0–10	3–7	3–5	0–7	1–7
Forfar Farmington	1–0	4–0	3–0		0–1	2–0	1–1	2–1	2–0	1–0	0–1
Glasgow City	3–1	9–0	10–0	7–0		5–0	8–0	8–1	8–0	8–1	5–1
Hamilton Academical	1–1	7–0	7–1	1–2	0–4		1–4	3–2	5–1	2–2	1–2
Hibernian	1–2	14–0	6–0	3–0	1–3	4–0		4–1	8–0	0–1	4–4
Hutchison Vale	1–2	5–0	5–0	0–4	0–5	3–6	0–6		6–1	1–3	1–1
Inverness City	1–3	3–0	3–0	0–2	0–10	0–8	0–5	3–1		2–2	0–3
Rangers	2–5	6–1	7–0	1–2	0–6	3–3	1–3	5–2	2–2		2–7
Spartans	6–4	9–0	9–0	4–3	1–6	4–2	1–3	7–1	7–0	2–2	

Updated to match(es) played on 6 November 2011. Source: Scottish Women's FA
Legend: Blue = home team win; Yellow = draw; Red = away team win.

=== Top scorers ===
As of 01:15, 15 November 2011 (GMT)

Rank	Player	Club	Goals
1	(Scotland) Susan Fairlie	Hamilton Academical	24
2	(Scotland) Suzanne Grant	Celtic	21
2	(Scotland) Jane Ross	Glasgow City	21
4	(Scotland) Lisa Evans	Glasgow City	18
5	(Scotland) Diana Barry	Spartans	17
6	(Scotland) Jennifer Callaghan	Rangers	16
7	(Scotland) Hayley Cunningham	Hibernian	15
8	(Scotland) Sarah Ewens	Spartans	14
8	(Germany) Katharina Lindner	Glasgow City	14
8	(Scotland) Christie Murray	Glasgow City	14
