= Rachel Corsie =

Scottish footballer (born 1989)

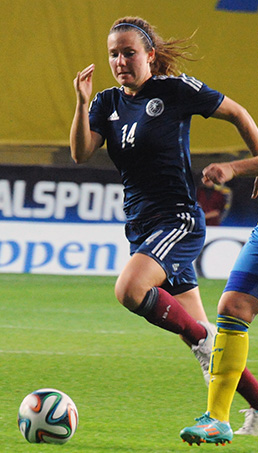
- Corsie playing for Scotland in 2014

Personal information
- Full name: Rachel Louise Corsie
- Date of birth: 17 August 1989 (age 37)
- Place of birth: Aberdeen, Scotland
- Height: 5 ft 9 in (1.75 m)
- Position: Central defender

Youth career
- –2006: Stonehaven

Senior career*
Years	Team	Apps	(Gls)
2006–2008	Aberdeen Ladies		
2008–2013	Glasgow City	47	(9)
2014	Notts County	13	(0)
2015–2017	Seattle Reign	44	(3)
2015	→ Glasgow City (loan)		
2018–2020	Utah Royals	43	(1)
2018–2019	→ Canberra United (loan)	11	(0)
2020	→ Birmingham City (loan)	7	(1)
2021	Kansas City Current	18	(0)
2022–2025	Aston Villa	44	(0)
Total		227+	(14+)

International career
2007–2008	Scotland U19	16	(2)
2009–2025	Scotland	155	(20)
- * Club domestic league appearances and goals

Rachel Louise Corsie (born 17 August 1989) is a Scottish former professional footballer who played as a defender.

== Club career ==
=== Aberdeen Ladies ===
Corsie began her career playing for Aberdeen Ladies, where she made her senior debut in 2006.

=== Glasgow City ===
In July 2008, Corsie joined Glasgow City in the Scottish Women's Premier League. In her first season with the club she contributed 10 goals as the club won a domestic treble.

In 2012, Corsie made her 100th league appearance for Glasgow City. Of the milestone, head coach Eddie Wolecki Black said, "I think it shows remarkable consistently she has managed to rack up 100 starts for the club in such a short period of time. People tend to forget that Rachel is still only 22 years of age and is continuing to develop as a player."

=== Notts County ===
In 2014, Corsie left Glasgow City for Notts County of the Women's Super League, fulfilling a longstanding desire to play in England's top level.

During her time at the club, she acted as captain and was awarded Supporters Player of the Season and joint Managers Player of the Season alongside Jess Clarke.

In January 2015, it was announced by Notts County that Corsie had chosen not to continue with the club for their forthcoming season.

=== Seattle Reign FC ===
Corsie signed with National Women's Soccer League team Seattle Reign FC in January 2015, joining fellow Scot Kim Little. In August, the team won the NWSL Shield.

==== Loan to Glasgow City ====
On 25 September 2015, Corsie re-joined Glasgow City on loan. During her loan spell, she scored in City's 3–1 win over Aberdeen to secure their ninth consecutive SWPL title.

==== Departure from the Reign ====
Corsie was released as a free agent by Seattle in January 2018.

=== Utah Royals FC/Kansas City ===
On 19 March 2018, Corsie signed with Utah Royals FC ahead of the team's inaugural season.

==== Loan to Canberra United ====
In October 2018, Corsie signed with Australian team Canberra United on loan for the 2018-19 W-League season. Prior to the first game of the season, Corsie was named team captain. She played every minute of the season for Canberra, who finished the season in 8th place and did not qualify for the playoffs.

==== Return to Utah ====
During the 2019 NWSL season, Corsie missed several NWSL games due to her participation in the 2019 FIFA Women's World Cup.

She scored her first goal for the Royals on 19 July 2019, helping Utah earn a 2–2 draw against the Portland Thorns.

==== Loan to Birmingham City ====
On 28 August 2020, Corsie signed on loan for Birmingham City until January 2021, missing the fall season of the National Women's Soccer League.

==== Transfer to Kansas City ====
In December 2020, Utah Royals FC ceased operations and was dissolved. Player contracts — including Corsie's — and franchise rights were sold to expansion team Kansas City NWSL (now known as the Kansas City Current). Corsie moved with the team to Kansas City following her return from loan in January 2021.

On 11 August 2021, Corsie signed a two season contract extension with the club, of which she has been named captain.

In January 2022, it was revealed that Kansas City Current had released Corsie in December. She was informed a few days before Christmas by her agent, and described the news as a "surprise".

=== Aston Villa ===
Following her release from the Current, Corsie was signed by WSL club Aston Villa.

In October 2024, Corsie underwent knee surgery — her sixth in total and the fifth on her left knee. During her return, she suffered a setback due to calf injury which delayed her reintroduction to the team.

Corsie left Aston Villa upon the conclusion of the 2024–25 season, and soon afterwards announced her retirement from playing.

== International career ==
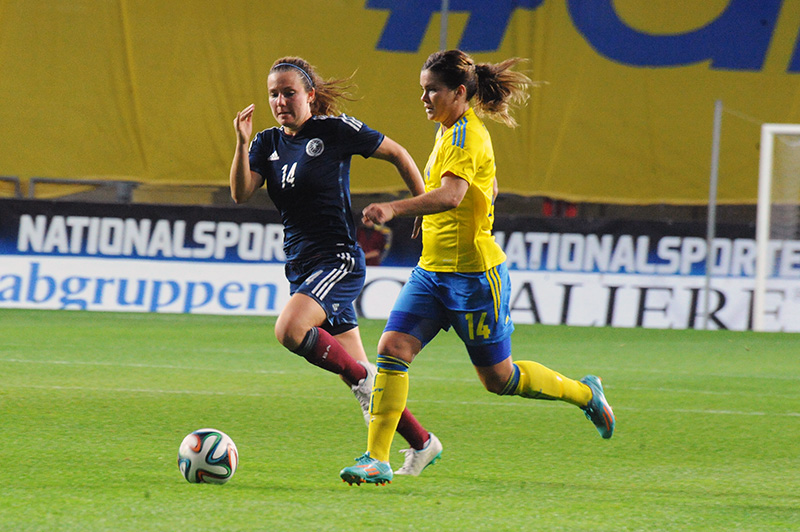
Corsie (L) chases Sweden's Hanna Folkesson

=== Youth team ===
Corsie captained the Scotland U-19 team to the finals of the 2008 UEFA Women's Under-19 Championship.

=== Senior team ===
At the 2009 Cyprus Cup, Corsie made her senior debut against France and was selected in all Scotland's games at the tournament.

In March 2011, Corsie captained the team to a 2–0 win over England, a first for Scotland in over 30 years.

In 2017, Scotland qualified for the European Championships for the first time. Corsie was named to the Scotland Team for Euro 2017 and appeared in all three group games for Scotland. On 10 September 2017, Corsie was named the new captain of the Scotland Women's National Team following Gemma Fay's retirement.

Corsie made her 100th international appearance on 12 June 2018, in a 2019 World Cup qualifier against Poland. Scotland won their qualifying group and qualified for the World Cup for the first time ever.

Corsie made her World Cup debut at the 2019 World Cup. She played every minute of Scotland's three group games. Scotland suffered two consecutive 2–1 losses to start the World Cup. In their third group match against Argentina, Scotland was leading 3–0 in the 70th minute before conceding three goals. The game would finish in a 3–3 draw, earning Scotland one point and ending their chances of advancing to the knockout round.

In May 2025, it was announced that Corsie would retire following Nations League matches that month against Austria and the Netherlands — her first call-up since July 2024. She retired with 154 international caps.

== Media career ==
During the men's Euro 2024, Corsie worked as a BBC pundit covering Scotland's matches. In June 2025, Corsie was announced as a BBC pundit for the Women's Euro happening that summer. She joined Sky Sports in September 2025 as an analyst for the broadcaster's WSL coverage. In June 2026, she was announced as a BBC co-commentator for the men's World Cup in the USA, Canada, and Mexico.

She has co-hosted a podcast for the BBC alongside former teammate Leanne Critchton.

== Personal life ==
Corsie's great-grandfather was Aberdeen FC player Donald Colman. She remains an Aberdeen FC supporter.

Corsie is a qualified chartered accountant. She has also earned her UEFA B coaching license.

She is a lesbian. Since 2019, Corsie has been in a relationship with Scottish squash player Lisa Aitken. As of 2024, the couple were engaged to be married.

== Career statistics ==
=== Club ===
As of match played 10 May 2025

Appearances and goals by club, season and competition
Club	Season	League			National cup		League cup		UWCL		Total	
Club	Season	Division	Apps	Goals	Apps	Goals	Apps	Goals	Apps	Goals	Apps	Goals
Glasgow City	2011	Scottish Women's Premier League	18	6	—		3	2	3	0	24	8
Glasgow City	2012	Scottish Women's Premier League	19	3	—		4	0	3	0	26	3
Glasgow City	2013	Scottish Women's Premier League	10	0	—		—		6	2	16	2
Glasgow City	Total		47	9	—		7	2	12	0	66	13
Notts County	2014	Women's Super League	13	0	—		6	1	—		19	1
Glasgow City (loan)	2015	Scottish Women's Premier League	—		—		—		2	0	2	0
Seattle Reign	2015	National Women's Soccer League	18	2	—		—		—		18	2
Seattle Reign	2016	National Women's Soccer League	12	1	—		—		—		12	1
Seattle Reign	2017	National Women's Soccer League	14	0	—		—		—		14	0
Seattle Reign	Total		44	3	0	0	0	0	0	0	44	3
Canberra United (loan)	2018–19	A-League Women	11	0	—	—	—	—	—	—	11	0
Birmingham City (loan)	2020–21	Women's Super League	7	1	—	—	2	0	—	—	9	1
Kansas City Current (loan)	2021	National Women's Soccer League	18	0	—	—	4	0	—	—	22	0
Utah Royals	2018	National Women's Soccer League	24	0	—	—	—	—	—	—	24	0
Utah Royals	2019	National Women's Soccer League	19	1	—	—	—	—	—	—	19	1
Utah Royals	2020	National Women's Soccer League	—	—	—	—	5	0	—	—	5	0
Utah Royals	2021	National Women's Soccer League	—	—	—	—	—	—	—	—	0	0
Utah Royals	Total		43	1	0	0	5	0	0	0	48	1
Aston Villa	2021–22	Women's Super League	6	0	1	0	—	—	—	—	7	0
Aston Villa	2022–23	Women's Super League	15	0	3	1	4	0	—	—	22	1
Aston Villa	2023–24	Women's Super League	21	0	1	0	5	1	—	—	27	1
Aston Villa	2024–25	Women's Super League	2	—	—	—	—	—	—	—	2	0
Aston Villa	Total		44	0	5	1	9	1	0	0	58	2
Career total			227	14	5	1	33	4	2	0	267	19

=== International appearances ===
Scotland statistics accurate as of match played 30 May 2025.

Year	Scotland	
Year	Apps	Goals
2009	11	1
2010	14	3
2011	10	1
2012	13	2
2013	8	2
2014	14	4
2015	10	3
2016	5	0
2017	9	0
2018	9	0
2019	11	0
2020	6	1
2021	9	1
2022	8	1
2023	9	1
2024	8	0
2025	1	0
Total	155	20

=== International goals ===
Key (expand for notes on "international goals" and sorting)
Location	Geographic location of the venue where the competition occurred Sorted by country name first, then by city name
Lineup	Start – played entire match on minute (off player) – substituted on at the minute indicated, and player was substituted off at the same time off minute (on player) – substituted off at the minute indicated, and player was substituted on at the same time (c) – captain Sorted by minutes played
#	NumberOfGoals.goalNumber scored by the player in the match (alternate notation to Goal in match)
Min	The minute in the match the goal was scored. For list that include caps, blank indicates played in the match but did not score a goal.
Assist/pass	The ball was passed by the player, which assisted in scoring the goal. This column depends on the availability and source of this information.
penalty or pk	Goal scored on penalty-kick which was awarded due to foul by opponent. (Goals scored in penalty-shoot-out, at the end of a tied match after extra-time, are not included.)
Score	The match score after the goal was scored. Sorted by goal difference, then by goal scored by the player's team
Result	The final score. Sorted by goal difference in the match, then by goal difference in penalty-shoot-out if it is taken, followed by goal scored by the player's team in the match, then by goal scored in the penalty-shoot-out. For matches with identical final scores, match ending in extra-time without penalty-shoot-out is a tougher match, therefore precede matches that ended in regulation
aet	The score at the end of extra-time; the match was tied at the end of 90' regulation
pso	Penalty-shoot-out score shown in parentheses; the match was tied at the end of extra-time
	Green background color – exhibition or closed door international friendly match
	Yellow background color – match at an invitational tournament
	Red background color – Olympic women's football qualification match
	Light-blue background color – FIFA women's world cup qualification match
	Pink background color – Olympic women's football tournament
	Blue background color – FIFA women's world cup final tournament
NOTE: some keys may not apply for a particular football player

Goal	Date	Location	Opponent	Result	Competition
1.	15 October 2009	The Oval, Belfast	Northern Ireland	3–0	Friendly
2.	27 March 2010	Mikheil Meskhi Stadium, Tbilisi	Georgia	3–1	2011 World Cup qualifying
3.	19 June 2010	Georgi Asparuhov Stadium, Sofia	Bulgaria	5–0	2011 World Cup qualifying
4.	21 August 2010	Strathclyde Homes Stadium, Dumbarton	Greece	4–1	2011 World Cup qualifying
5.	21 September 2011	Tynecastle Stadium, Edinburgh	Finland	7–2	Friendly
6.	16 June 2012	Tynecastle Stadium, Edinburgh	Israel	8–0	2013 UEFA Women's Euro qualifying
7.	21 June 2012	Turners Cross, Cork	Republic of Ireland	1–0	2013 UEFA Women'sEuro qualifying
8.	22 September 2013	Tórsvøllur, Tórshavn	Faroe Islands	7–2	2015 World Cup qualifying
9.	26 September 2013	Fir Park, Motherwell	Bosnia and Herzegovina	7–0	2015 World Cup qualifying
10.	3 August 2014	Palmerston Park, Dumfries	Bosnia and Herzegovina	1–1	Friendly
11.	13 September 2014	Estádio do Dr. José de Matos, Viana do Castelo	Portugal	1–1	Friendly
12.	13 September 2014	Fir Park, Motherwell	Faroe Islands	9–0	2015 World Cup qualifying
13.	13 September 2014	Fir Park, Motherwell	Faroe Islands	9–0	2015 World Cup qualifying
14.	23 October 2015	Fir Park, Motherwell	Belarus	7–0	UEFA Women's Euro 2017 qualifying
15.	27 October 2015	FFM Training Centre, Skopje	North Macedonia	4–1	UEFA Women's Euro 2017 qualifying
16.	27 October 2015	FFM Training Centre, Skopje	North Macedonia	4–1	UEFA Women's Euro 2017 qualifying
17.	23 October 2020	Tynecastle Park, Edinburgh	Albania	3–0	UEFA Women's Euro 2022 qualifying
18.	22 October 2021	Hampden Park, Glasgow	Hungary	2–1	2023 World Cup qualifying
19.	6 September 2022	Tórsvøllur, Tórshavn	Faroe Islands	6–0	2023 World Cup qualifying
20.	18 February 2023	Pinatar Arena, San Pedro del Pinatar	Philippines	2–1	2023 Pinatar Cup

== Honours ==
Glasgow City

- Scottish Women's Premier League: 2008–09, 2009, 2010, 2011, 2012, 2013, 2015
- Scottish Women's Cup: 2009, 2011, 2012, 2013, 2015
- Scottish Women's Premier League Cup: 2008–09, 2009, 2012, 2013

Seattle Reign

- NWSL Shield: 2015

Individual

- Kat Lindner Award for Outstanding Academic and Athletic Achievement (SWF Awards): 2019

Scotland

- Pinatar Cup: 2020- winner, 2024- runner up

== See also ==
- List of foreign NWSL players
- List of association football families
- List of women's footballers with 100 or more caps
- Scottish FA Women's International Roll of Honour
