= 2011 Scottish Women's Cup =

2011 Henson Projects Scottish Cup
Tournament details
- Country: Scotland
- Teams: 49

Final positions
- Champions: Glasgow City
- Runners-up: Hibernian

The 2011 Scottish Women's Cup was the 40th official edition (42nd overall) of the main national cup competition in Scottish women's football. All teams in the Scottish Women's Football League were eligible to enter, with Scottish Women's Premier League clubs receiving a bye to the Second Round. The tournament was known as the Henson Projects Scottish Cup after a sponsorship arrangement.

== Calendar ==
Round	Date	Matches	Clubs	New entries this round
First Round	8 May 2011	17	49 → 32	34
Second Round	19 June 2011	16	32 → 16	15
Third Round	28 August 2011	8	16 → 8	none
Quarter-finals	25 September 2011	4	8 → 4	none
Semifinals	19/20 October 2011	2	4 → 2	none
Final	13 November 2011	1	2 → 1	none

== First round ==
Aberdeen City, Stenhousemuir, Troon and Viewfield Rovers all received byes to the Second Round.

Home team	Score	Away team
Kilwinning Sports Club	4 – 2	Dunfermline Athletic
Hamilton Academical Reserves	0 – 3	Hibernian 2000
Stranraer	1 – 11	Paisley Saints Ladies
Buchan	4 – 3	Dee Vale
Murieston United Ladies	2 – 1	Glasgow City Reserves
Hearts	6 – 0	Dumfries
SC Bon Accord	2 – 15	Raith Rovers
Wishaw Juniors	2 – 3	Airdrie United
Forfar Farmington Blues	1 – 6	Hibernian 1875
EK Galaxy	1 – 3	Dundee City
Forfar Farmington Ladies	8 – 0	Spartans B
Falkirk FC Girls	0 – 4	Celtic Reserves
Moray	0 – 4	Cowdenbeath
Toryglen	13 – 0	Kemnay
East Fife	5 – 0	Milton Rovers
Spartans C	0 – 5	Aberdeen
Queen's Park	7 – 1	Glasgow Girls

== Second round ==
Home team	Score	Away team
Toryglen	4 – 2	Hibernian 2000
Forfar Farmington	4 – 3	Inverness City
Kilwinning Sports Club	4 – 4	Forfar Farmington Ladies
Kilwinning Sports Club won 2–1 on penalties
Falkirk	3 – 1	Dundee City
Buchan	w/o	Viewfield Rovers
Celtic Reserves	3 – 0	Airdrie United
Hibernian	3 – 2	Hutchison Vale
Hibernian 1875	1 – 3	Raith Rovers
Aberdeen City	2 – 2	Stenhousemuir
Stenhousemuir won 4–2 on penalties
Hamilton Academical	4 – 1	Murieston United Ladies
Rangers	11 – 0	Troon Ladies
Spartans	15 – 0	FC Kilmarnock Ladies
Celtic	3 – 0	Aberdeen
Queen's Park	1 – 0	Hearts
East Fife	1 – 4	Paisley Saints Ladies
Cowdenbeath	0 – 14	Glasgow City

== Third round ==
Rangers withdrew from the competition.

Home team	Score	Away team
Hamilton Academical	0 – 4	Forfar Farmington
Rangers	w/o	Glasgow City
Celtic Reserves	5 – 0	Paisley Saints Ladies
Toryglen	4 – 1	Queen's Park
Hibernian	9 – 1	Kilwinning Sports Club
Buchan	1 – 7	Spartans
Stenhousemuir	3 – 6	Raith Rovers
Celtic	8 – 0	Falkirk

== Quarter-finals ==
The draw for the Quarter-finals took place live on Real Radio on 29 August 2011.

Home team	Score	Away team
Celtic Reserves	1 – 0	Raith Rovers
Hibernian	3 – 1	Spartans
Celtic	4 – 3	Toryglen
Glasgow City	4 – 1	Forfar Farmington

== Semi-finals ==
The draw for the Semifinals took place on 28 September 2011.

19 October 2011
19:45

Glasgow City	3–0	Celtic
E. Woolley; McSorley; D. Dalziel

Ravenscraig Regional Sports Facility, Motherwell

20 October 2011
19:45

Hibernian	2–1	Celtic Reserves
Emslie; Brown		L. Quigley

Ravenscraig Regional Sports Facility, Motherwell

== Final ==
13 November 2011
15:00

Glasgow City	3–0	Hibernian
Murray 11'; Evans 70' 87'

Toryglen Regional Football Centre, Glasgow
Referee: Lorraine Clark

Glasgow City	Hibernian

GK	21	Laura Williamson
DF	3	Emma Mitchell
DF	5	Eilish McSorley
MF	6	Joanne Love	(substituted off) 87'
FW	7	Katharina Lindner	(substituted off) 74'
FW	12	Christie Murray	(substituted off) 78'
DF	14	Rachel Corsie (c)
DF	15	Emma Fernon	(substituted off) 81'
MF	16	Leanne Ross
FW	17	Lisa Evans
MF	19	Clare Gemmell	(substituted off) 78'
Substitutes:
MF	4	Emma Woolley	(substituted on) 78'
DF	8	Jill Paterson	(substituted on) 81'
FW	10	Jane Ross	(substituted on) 74'
DF	20	Ciara Barnes
DF	18	Danica Dalziel	(substituted on) 78'
MF	2	Lauren McMurchie	(substituted on) 87'
Head coach:
Eddie Wolecki Black

GK	1	Shannon Lynn
DF	2	Emma Brownlie
DF	4	Frankie Brown
DF	5	Suzanne Robertson
FW	7	Hayley Cunningham
MF	8	Natalie Ross
DF	10	Lisa Robertson
MF	12	Jenna Ross	(substituted off) 74'
FW	14	Claire Emslie
FW	15	Rebecca Zoltie	(substituted off) 64'
MF	16	Laura Kennedy (c)
Substitutes:
DF	3	Stefanie Malcolm
MF	6	Hollie Thomson
MF	16	Leanne Crichton	(substituted on) 64'
FW	19	Ellen Pia	(substituted on) 74'
Head coach:
Willie Kirk
