= 2012 Scottish Women's Cup =

2012 Henson Scottish Cup
Tournament details
- Country: Scotland
- Teams: 61

Final positions
- Champions: Glasgow City
- Runners-up: Forfar Farmington

The 2012 Scottish Women's Cup was the 41st official edition (43rd overall) of the main national cup competition in Scottish women's football. All teams in the Scottish Women's Football League and Premier League were eligible to enter. Thurso-based Caithness Ladies, who do not play in league competition, also took part for the first time. The tournament was known as the Henson Scottish Cup after a sponsorship arrangement.

== Calendar ==
Round	Date	Matches	Clubs	New entries this round
Preliminary Round	25 March 2012	9	61 → 52	18
First Round	13 May 2012	20	52 → 32	31
Second Round	10 June 2012	16	32 → 16	12
Third Round	19 August 2012	8	16 → 8	none
Quarter-finals	30 September 2012	4	8 → 4	none
Semi-finals	17 October 2012	2	4 → 2	none
Final	11 November 2012	1	2 → 1	none

== Preliminary round ==
The draw for the preliminary and first rounds took place at Hampden Park on 3 March 2012.

Home team	Score	Away team
Buchan Youth	1 – 4	Glasgow City Reserves
Falkirk FC Girls	w/o	Turriff United
Football Club of Edinburgh	0 – 8	Airdrie United
Forfar Farmington Ladies	2 – 2 (2 – 4 pens)	Dee Ladies
Hamilton Academical Reserves	2 – 0	East Fife
Jeanfield Swifts	6 – 0	Stranraer
Kilwinning Sports Club	3 – 1	Dunfermline Athletic
Leith Athletic	1 – 8	Celtic Reserves
Musselburgh Windsor	1 – 5	Spartans Reserves

== First round ==
Home team	Score	Away team
Aberdeen Reserves	3 – 4	Celtic Reserves
Arbroath Community SC	w/o	Stenhousemuir
Boroughmuir Thistle	1 – 2	Cowdenbeath
Buchan	3 – 0	Jeanfield Swifts
Glasgow City Reserves	0 – 3	Dee Ladies
Dundee City	2 – 6	Heart of Midlothian
EKFC Galaxy	1 – 5	Kilwinning SC
Falkirk Ladies Reserves	2 – 0	Raith Rovers
Airdrie United	4 – 1	Dumfries
Forfar Farmington Reserves	11 – 0	Kemnay
Hamilton Academical Reserves	1 – 2	Spartans Reserves
Hibernian 1875	4 – 0	Aberdeen Development
Hibernian Reserves	13 – 0	Caithness Ladies
Monifieth	2 – 7	Viewfield Rovers
Moray	1 – 3	Queen's Park
Murieston United	6 – 0	Dee Vale
Paisley Saints Ladies	12 – 0	Luthermuir
Seton Ladies	0 – 14	Claremont Ladies
Stonehaven	4 – 0	Glasgow Girls
Troon	3 – 2	Falkirk FC Girls

== Second round ==
The second round draw took place at Dens Park, Dundee on 23 May 2012.

Home team	Score	Away team
Inverness City	8 – 3 (a.e.t.)	Buchan
Murieston United	0 – 13	Glasgow City
Spartans	w/o	Dee Ladies
Forfar Farmington	11 – 0	Viewfield Rovers
Kilwinning Sports Club	5 – 7 (a.e.t.)	Aberdeen
F.C. Kilmarnock Ladies	0 – 5	Celtic
Airdrie United	7 – 2	Stenhousemuir
Hibernian 1875	3 – 1	Falkirk
Celtic Reserves	6 – 1	Hutchison Vale
Rangers	5 – 1	Spartans Reserves
Forfar Farmington Reserves	1 – 3	Queen's Park
Hibernian	5 – 0	Paisley Saints Ladies
Cowdenbeath	4 – 3	Heart of Midlothian
Claremont Ladies	2 – 2 (a.e.t.) (2 – 4 pens)	Hibernian Reserves
Stonehaven	8 – 3	Falkirk Reserves
Hamilton Academical	10 – 1	Troon

== Third round ==
The third round draw took place at Hampden Park on 14 June 2012.

Home team	Score	Away team
Queen's Park	7 – 3	Cowdenbeath
Celtic	5 – 2 (a.e.t.)	Spartans
Hibernian Reserves	1 – 0	Hibernian 1875
Aberdeen	0 – 3	Glasgow City
Forfar Farmington	3 – 0	Airdrie United
Celtic Reserves	0 – 3	Hibernian
Rangers	2 – 0	Inverness City
Stonehaven	1 – 9	Hamilton Academical

== Quarter-finals ==
The draw for the quarter-finals took place on the Clyde 1 Superscoreboard programme on 28 August 2012. Celtic were expelled from the competition as they were unable to field a side against Glasgow City. The club had previously requested to reschedule the fixture but this was rejected by SWF.

Home team	Score	Away team
Glasgow City	w/o	Celtic
Hamilton Academical	6 – 1	Hibernian Reserves
Queen's Park	1 – 6	Hibernian
Rangers	1 – 2	Forfar Farmington

== Semifinals ==
17 October 2012

Glasgow City	3 – 0	Hibernian
Mitchell (2); Love

Ravenscraig Regional Sports Facility, Motherwell
Referee: Kylie McMullan

17 October 2012

Hamilton Academical	1 – 2 (a.e.t.)	Forfar Farmington
C. Gemmell		Graham; Grant

Ravenscraig Regional Sports Facility, Motherwell
Referee: Jennifer Carbery

== Final ==
11 November 2012
14:00

Glasgow City	1 – 0	Forfar Farmington
Dalziel 34'

Excelsior Stadium, Airdrie
Referee: Morag Pirie

Glasgow City	Forfar Farmington

GK	1	Claire Johnstone
MF	4	Danni Pagliarulo
DF	5	Eilish McSorley
MF	6	Joanne Love
MF	8	Leanne Crichton
FW	9	Emma Mitchell
FW	10	Jane Ross
DF	11	Nicola Docherty
DF	15	Emma Fernon
MF	16	Leanne Ross (c)
DF	18	Danica Dalziel
Substitutes:
GK	22	Lee Alexander
MF	3	Suzanne Lappin
FW	12	Julie Melrose
FW	13	Ruesha Littlejohn
FW	19	Ashley McDonald
DF	20	Ciara Barnes
FW	7	Christie Murray
Head coach:
Eddie Wolecki Black

GK	1	Catherine Fitzsimmons
DF	5	Fay McDonald
DF	10	Nicola Davidson (c)
DF	21	Kelly Clark
DF	4	Rachael Small
DF	11	Alana Bruce
MF	6	Aimee Godfrey
MF	18	Lucy Graham
FW	14	Abbi Grant
FW	8	Julia Ralph Scott
FW	19	Nicky Grant
Substitutes:
DF	2	Gemma Collier
FW	12	Caroline Heron
DF	15	Iona Colville
FW	16	Caren Webster
DF	23	Stephanie Milne
MF	22	Joanna Collier
Head coach:
Mark Nisbet
