= Lucy Hope (footballer) =

Scottish footballer

Personal information
- Full name: Lucy Hope
- Birth name: Lucy Graham
- Date of birth: 10 October 1996 (age 30)
- Place of birth: Ballingry, Scotland
- Height: 1.65 m (5 ft 5 in)
- Position: Midfielder

Senior career*
Years	Team	Apps	(Gls)
2012–2013	Forfar Farmington	31	(5)
2013–2015	Hibernian	10	(3)
2015	Mallbackens	12	(2)
2016–2018	Hibernian		
2018–2019	Bristol City	19	(7)
2019–2026	Everton	96	(12)

International career^{‡}
2011–2012	Scotland U17	7	(2)
2013–2015	Scotland U19	23	(5)
2017–	Scotland	24	(0)
- * Club domestic league appearances and goals as of 15 March 2025 ‡ National team caps and goals as of 14:01, 16 April 2023 (UTC)

Lucy Hope (née Graham; born 10 October 1996) is a Scottish former footballer who played as a midfielder. She played for Everton in the FA WSL and the Scotland national team, as well as Forfar Farmington and Hibernian in Scotland, Mallbackens in Sweden and Bristol City in England.

== Club career ==
Hope began her senior career at Forfar Farmington in 2012. In her first season, she helped the club finish second in the SWPL and reach the Scottish Women's Cup final. Her performances earned her a nomination for the Players' Player of the Year award.

In the summer of 2013, she left Forfar Farmington to join Hibernian.

In July 2015, Hope left Hibernian to join Swedish club Mallbackens.

In January 2016, Hope returned to Hibernian. On 5 October 2016, she made her UEFA Women's Champions League debut in a 6–0 loss to Bayern Munich. She played a crucial role in Hibernian's 2017–18 UEFA Women's Champions League campaign, scoring four goals in three matches.

Hope joined Bristol City in July 2018. On 19 August 2018, she scored twice in her debut against Leicester City in the FA WSL Cup. On 9 September 2018, she made her league debut and scored the winning goal in a 1–0 victory against Brighton & Hove Albion. She ended the campaign as the team's leading goalscorer with seven league goals and twelve in all competitions. In May 2019, it was announced Hope was to leave Bristol after just one season.

On 4 July 2019, Everton announced they had signed Hope to a two-year deal. On 1 July 2025, she signed a new one year contract with the club.

On 5 June 2026, Hope announced her retirement from professional football.

== International career ==
Hope was included in the Scotland squad for a friendly match with Belgium in April 2017. On 14 September 2017, she made her full international debut in a 3–0 win over Hungary.

== Personal life ==
Hope was known as Lucy Graham until getting married in December 2022.

== Career statistics ==
=== International appearances ===
Scotland statistics accurate as of match played 11 April 2023.

Year	Scotland	
Year	Apps	Goals
2017	1	0
2018	—	
2019	2	0
2020	5	0
2021	8	0
2022	8	0
Total	24	0

== Honours ==
=== Hibernian ===
Winner

- Scottish Women's Cup (2): 2016, 2017
- Scottish Women's Premier League Cup (2): 2016, 2017

Runner-up

- Scottish Women's Premier League: 2013
- Scottish Women's Cup: 2013
- Scottish Women's Premier League Cup (2): 2014, 2015

=== Forfar Farmington ===
Runner-up

- Scottish Women's Premier League: 2012
- Scottish Women's Cup: 2012
