= 2016 Scottish Women's Football League First Division =

SWFL 1
- Season: 2016
- Promoted: East Fife; Motherwell
- Relegated: Dundee City; Spartans Reserves; Stonehaven
- Matches: 223
- Goals: 1,260 (5.65 per match)
- Biggest home win: North: East Fife 9–0 Dundee City (18 September 2016); South: Motherwell 12–0 Spartans Reserves (2 October 2016)
- Biggest away win: North: Dundee City 0–12 Aberdeen Reserves (11 September 2016); South: Heart of Midlothian U23s 0–13 Hibernian Development (28 August 2016); Heart of Midlothian U23s 0–13 Motherwell (28 August 2016)
- Highest scoring: North: Stonehaven 5–8 Falkirk FC (5 June 2016); South: Heart of Midlothian U23s 0–13 Hibernian Development (28 August 2016); Heart of Midlothian U23s 0–13 Motherwell (28 August 2016); Heart of Midlothian U23s 3–10 FC Kilmarnock (5 June 2016)
- Longest winning run: 20 matches: East Fife
- Longest unbeaten run: 20 matches: East Fife
- Longest winless run: 14 matches: Spartans Reserves
- Longest losing run: 14 matches: Spartans Reserves
- All statistics correct as of 23 October 2016.

The 2016 Scottish Women's Football League First Division, commonly known as SWFL 1, is the first season of the Scottish Women's Football League First Division, the third tier of women's football in Scotland since its reconstruction at the end of the 2015 season.

From this season the SWFL was split into two regional divisions of 12 teams each, North and South. The change was made to increase competitiveness in the league.

== SWFL 1 North ==
=== Teams ===
Locations of teams in the 2016 SWFL 1 North

Team	Location	Home ground	Capacity	2015 position	source
Aberdeen Reserves	Aberdeen	Balgownie Playing Fields	1,000		
Central Girls	Grangemouth	Inchyra Park	1,000		
Dee Ladies	Portlethen	Nicol Park	1,000		
Dee Vale	Aberdeen	Corbie Hall and Field Maryculter	1,000		
Dundee City	Dundee	Downfield Park	1,000		
Dunfermline Athletic	Cowdenbeath	Humbug Park	1,000		
East Fife	Leven	King George V Park	1,000		
Falkirk W.F.C.	Falkirk				
Falkirk Ladies	Denny	Westfield Park	1,000		
Forfar Farmington Development	Forfar				
Stonehaven	Stonehaven				
Tayside Ladies	Dundee	St Pauls Academy	1,000		

=== Standings ===
Pos	Team	Pld	W	D	L	GF	GA	GD	Pts	Qualification or relegation
1	East Fife (C)	22	22	0	0	116	17	+99	66	2017 SWPL 2
2	Dunfermline Athletic	22	16	1	5	90	41	+49	49	
3	Central Girls	22	12	5	5	68	53	+15	41	
4	Aberdeen Reserves	22	12	2	8	78	42	+36	38	
5	Forfar Farmington Development	22	11	3	8	65	61	+4	36	
6	Dee Ladies	22	11	2	9	63	52	+11	35	
7	Falkirk W.F.C.	22	10	3	9	59	55	+4	33	
8	Dee Vale	22	6	3	13	48	91	−43	21	
9	Tayside Ladies	22	5	5	12	45	71	−26	20	
10	Falkirk Ladies	22	6	2	14	44	87	−43	20	
11	Stonehaven (R)	22	4	0	18	53	99	−46	12	2017 SWFL 2
12	Dundee City (R)	22	3	2	17	43	103	−60	11	2017 SWFL 2

Updated to match(es) played on 16 October 2016. Source: Soccerway
Rules for classification: 1) Points; 2) Goal difference; 3) Number of goals scored
(C) Champions; (R) Relegated

=== Results ===
Home \ Away	ABE	CEN	DEL	DEV	DUN	DNF	EFI	FFC	FAL	FOR	STO	TAY
Aberdeen Development		1–1	8–1	2–0	5–0	1–5	0–3	4–0	7–2	0–1	4–2	8–0
Central Girls	1–0		0–3	3–0	5–2	1–2	0–3	3–0	3–0	5–4	8–4	4–4
Dee Ladies	8–3	2–4		3–1	7–1	3–6	0–3	3–3	4–3	3–0	3–1	2–0
Dee Vale	0–5	5–5	4–1		5–5	1–10	0–7	3–6	3–0	2–7	5–3	0–7
Dundee City	0–12	2–4	1–4	1–4		4–1	2–7	2–3	1–3	1–2	4–2	5–2
Dunfermline Athletic	3–0	7–0	2–0	7–1	9–2		2–6	4–2	4–3	5–1	4–1	1–0
East Fife	7–0	5–1	3–1	8–2	9–0	4–2		2–0	8–1	6–0	9–1	3–0
Falkirk W.F.C.	2–2	3–5	2–1	2–0	2–4	3–5	0–4		4–0	2–3	7–0	2–1
Falkirk Ladies	1–5	2–7	2–0	4–3	4–4	1–1	2–4	3–1		3–5	2–1	4–3
Forfar Farmington Development	3–9	0–3	2–2	0–3	4–3	3–1	1–3	6–1	6–2		4–2	2–2
Stonehaven	1–2	3–6	2–6	1–2	2–5	4–2	1–6	5–8	7–1	1–9		0–5
Tayside Ladies	1–0	2–2	1–6	4–4	2–1	0–7	1–6	0–3	7–1	2–2	2–8	

Updated to match(es) played on 30 October 2016. Source: Scottish Women's Football
Legend: Blue = home team win; Yellow = draw; Red = away team win.

== SWFL 1 South ==
=== Teams ===
Locations of teams in the 2016 SWFL 1 South

Team	Location	Home ground	Capacity	2015 position	source
Boroughmuir Thistle	Edinburgh	Meggetland Sport Complex	1,000		
Celtic Academy	Lennoxtown	Lennoxtown Training Centre	1,000		
Claremont					
Cumbernauld Colts	Cumbernauld	Ravenswood Playing Fields	1,000		
Glasgow City Development	Glasgow				
Heart of Midlothian U23s	Edinburgh				
Hibernian Development	Edinburgh	Meggetland Sport Complex	1,000		
FC Kilmarnock	Hurlford	Blair Park	1,500		
Motherwell	Wishaw	Wishaw Sports Centre	1,000		
Rangers Development	Glasgow				
Spartans Reserves	Edinburgh				
Westerlands	Glasgow				

=== Standings ===
Pos	Team	Pld	W	D	L	GF	GA	GD	Pts	Qualification or relegation
1	Motherwell (C)	20	16	1	3	103	25	+78	49	2017 SWPL 2
2	Hibernian Development	20	14	2	4	75	21	+54	44	
3	Celtic Academy	20	13	3	4	44	15	+29	42	
4	Rangers Development	20	12	2	6	62	37	+25	38	
5	FC Kilmarnock	20	11	3	6	59	44	+15	36	
6	Glasgow City Development	20	11	2	7	54	47	+7	35	
7	Cumbernauld Colts	20	9	5	6	63	37	+26	32	
8	Westerlands	20	6	0	14	41	57	−16	18	
9	Boroughmuir Thistle	20	3	3	14	31	65	−34	12	
10	Heart of Midlothian U23s	20	2	1	17	22	128	−106	7	
11	Spartans Reserves (R)	20	2	0	18	19	97	−78	6	2017 SWFL 2
12	Claremont	0	0	0	0	0	0	0	0	Withdrawn

Updated to match(es) played on 3 November 2016. Source: Soccerway
Rules for classification: 1) Points; 2) Goal difference; 3) Number of goals scored
(C) Champions; (R) Relegated

=== Results ===
Home \ Away	BOR	CEL	CLA	CUM	GLA	HOM	HIB	KIL	MOT	RAN	SPA	WES
Boroughmuir Thistle		1–3		0–1	1–6		1–4	5–1	0–6	0–3	6–1	0–2
Celtic Academy	4–1				5–0	8–0	2–2	1–4	0–3	0–1	2–0	2–0
Claremont												
Cumbernauld Colts	5–0	0–0			0–1	8–1	2–2	2–3	1–3	3–1	11–1	3–1
Glasgow City Development	4–4			2–2		8–4	0–3	0–3	1–8	0–1	4–2	4–1
Heart of Midlothian U23s	2–0	0–3		1–8	1–3		0–13	3–10	0–13	1–5	0–5	0–6
Hibernian Development	3–0	0–1		4–1	2–4	5–1		2–0	1–2		5–0	3–1
FC Kilmarnock	2–2	0–2		3–3	3–1	6–1	1–7			1–1	7–0	3–2
Motherwell	4–3	6–2		8–2	1–2	9–0	1–2	7–1		6–3	12–0	3–1
Rangers Development	6–2	2–3		4–1	2–1	7–2	3–2	1–4	1–1		9–0	5–1
Spartans Reserves	1–2	0–1		1–5	0–5	1–2	0–5	1–2	0–10	1–5		0–2
Westerlands	3–0	0–4		1–5		7–0	0–6	0–3	2–3	3–6	3–1	

Updated to match(es) played on 15 October 2016. Source: Scottish Women's Football
Legend: Blue = home team win; Yellow = draw; Red = away team win.
