= Claire Johnstone =

Scottish footballer (born 1982)

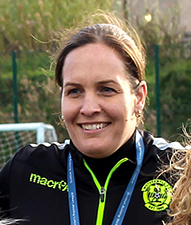
- Johnstone in 2018 with Motherwell

Personal information
- Full name: Claire Johnstone
- Date of birth: 11 January 1982 (age 44)
- Place of birth: Portsmouth, England
- Height: 1.75 m (5 ft 9 in)
- Position: Goalkeeper

Youth career
- Lincoln Ladies
- Doncaster Belles

Senior career*
Years	Team	Apps	(Gls)
2001–2004	Kilmarnock Ladies		
2004	ÍBV	13	(0)
2004–2007	Hamilton Academical		
2007	Þór/KA	11	(0)
2007–2009	Celtic		
2009–2014	Glasgow City	60	(2)
2014–2018	Rangers		
2018–	Motherwell		

International career^{‡}
1999–2007	Scotland		
- * Club domestic league appearances and goals ‡ National team caps and goals as of 14:50, 30 June 2012 (UTC)

Claire Johnstone (born 11 January 1982) is a Scottish football goalkeeper.

== Club career ==
After playing for Doncaster Belles at Under–18 level, Johnstone moved to Scotland in February 2001, where she was signed for Kilmarnock by manager Jim Chapman.

In the 2004 summer season, Johnstone played in Iceland with ÍBV and made 13 Úrvalsdeild appearances. She returned to Iceland in 2007 to play 11 games for Þór/KA.

Johnstone and Suzanne Malone left Celtic for champions Glasgow City in June 2009. In October 2010 Johnstone played as a substitute striker due to an injury crisis and scored in Glasgow City's 16–0 win over Aberdeen.

Before the 2012 Scottish Women's Premier League season, Johnstone held transfer talks with Forfar Farmington. She played in a friendly match but the move broke down.

After a spell with Rangers, Johnstone joined Motherwell in 2018.

== International career ==
Johnstone made her senior Scottish national team debut against Moldova in April 1999. For several years she was the national team's regular understudy to Gemma Fay.
