= 2013 Scottish Women's Premier League =

Scottish Women's Premier League
- Season: 2013
- Champions: Glasgow City (8th title)
- Relegated: Falkirk; Kilwinning SC
- Champions League: Glasgow City
- Matches: 126
- Goals: 651 (5.17 per match)
- Biggest home win: Hibernian 11–0 Falkirk; 9 June 2013
- Biggest away win: Kilwinning SC 0–12 Glasgow City; 5 May 2013
- Highest scoring: Kilwinning SC 0–12 Glasgow City; 5 May 2013

The 2013 Scottish Women's Premier League was the twelfth season of the Scottish Women's Premier League, the highest division of women's football in Scotland since its inception in 2002. The competition started on 17 March 2013.

A total of twelve teams contested the league. Glasgow City were the reigning champions.

Buchan and Kilwinning SC were promoted from the SWFL First Division after finishing 3rd and 4th respectively and both appeared in the Premier League for the first time (First Division champions Hibernian Reserves and runners-up Celtic Reserves were unable to be promoted as league rules stipulate each club may field only one team in the Premier League).

The SWPL continued in the format adopted in 2012. The 12 clubs faced each other once (11 games per club), after which the league split into top six and bottom six sections based on league position. Each club then played home and away against clubs in their respective sections to give a total of 21 games.

Glasgow City won their seventh consecutive championship title on 29 September 2013. also won the 2013 Scottish Women's Premier League Cup and the 2013 Scottish Women's Cup to complete the 'treble', the third in their history and second in a row. Hibernian were runners-up, 20 points behind the champions. Buchan and Kilwinning SC were relegated.

== Teams ==
=== Stadia and locations ===
Locations of teams in the 2013 Premier League

The most regular home ground is shown though some clubs played matches at other venues throughout the season.

Team	Location	Home ground	Head coach	Finishing position 2012
Aberdeen	Aberdeen	Heathryfold Park	Allan Smith	6th
Buchan LFC	Maud	Pleasure Park	Ewen Reid	SWFL First Division, 3rd
Celtic	Glasgow	Celtic Training Centre, Lennoxtown	David Haley	3rd
Falkirk	Falkirk	Recreation Park, Alloa	Alan Palmer	10th
Forfar Farmington	Forfar	Station Park	Mark Nisbet	2nd
Glasgow City	Glasgow	Petershill Park	Eddie Wolecki-Black	1st
Hamilton Academical	Hamilton	John Cumming Stadium, Carluke	Kevin Murphy	7th
Hibernian	Edinburgh	Albyn Park, Broxburn	Willie Kirk	4th
Hutchison Vale	Edinburgh	Saughton Enclosure	Ian Macdonald	8th
Kilwinning SC Ladies	Kilwinning	Kilwinning Sports Club	Craig Hamilton	SWFL First Division, 4th
Rangers	Glasgow	Petershill Park	Angie Hind	9th
Spartans	Edinburgh	Spartans Academy	Debbi McCulloch	5th

== League standings ==
Pos	Team	Pld	W	D	L	GF	GA	GD	Pts	Qualification or relegation
1	Glasgow City (C, Q)	21	20	1	0	110	7	+103	61	2014–15 Champions League
2	Hibernian	21	13	2	6	86	35	+51	41	
3	Celtic	21	11	3	7	44	32	+12	36	
4	Spartans	21	11	2	8	50	53	−3	35	
5	Rangers	21	10	3	8	55	35	+20	33	
6	Aberdeen	21	8	1	12	29	55	−26	25	
7	Hamilton Academical	21	13	2	6	70	43	+27	41	
8	Forfar Farmington	21	12	4	5	72	35	+37	40	
9	Hutchison Vale	21	5	2	14	44	75	−31	17	
10	Buchan LFC	21	4	3	14	37	79	−42	15	
11	Falkirk (R)	21	4	0	17	31	86	−55	12	Relegation to SWFL First Division
12	Kilwinning SC Ladies (R)	21	3	1	17	23	116	−93	10	Relegation to SWFL First Division

Source: Scottish Women's FA
Rules for classification: 1) Points; 2) Goal difference; 3) Number of goals scored
(C) Champions; (Q) Qualified for the phase indicated; (R) Relegated

== Results ==
=== Matches 1–11 ===
Clubs play each other once.

Home \ Away	ABD	BUC	CEL	FAL	FFM	GLC	HAM	HIB	HUT	KWG	RAN	SPA
Aberdeen		2–1	2–1	2–0		1–5			2–1			2–3
Buchan LFC			1–7		2–3		5–4	0–7			0–5	
Celtic					4–2		3–1	2–3	3–0	3–0	1–3	
Falkirk		6–1	1–3		0–4	0–10			2–4		0–3	
Forfar Farmington	2–3						2–2	1–4	5–2	6–0		2–2
Glasgow City		7–0	3–0		5–1		5–0				3–2	
Hamilton Academical	1–0			7–0				1–4		2–1		0–3
Hibernian	4–0			11–0		0–4				10–1		7–1
Hutchison Vale		2–2				1–8	3–7	0–9		3–2		
Kilwinning SC Ladies	1–2	1–1		5–4		0–12						0–6
Rangers	5–1				0–0		5–2	3–3	3–0	10–0		
Spartans		6–1	1–0	4–0		1–3			5–0		0–1	

Updated to match(es) played on 30 June 2013. Source: Scottish Women's FA
Legend: Blue = home team win; Yellow = draw; Red = away team win.

=== Matches 12–21 ===
After 11 matches, the league splits into top six and bottom six sections. Clubs played every other club in their section twice (home and away).

==== Top six ====
Home \ Away	ABD	CEL	GLC	HIB	RAN	SPA
Aberdeen		2–2	0–4	2–3	2–1	2–3
Celtic	2–1		0–4	2–1	2–1	3–0
Glasgow City	7–0	3–0		4–0	0–0	8–1
Hibernian	6–1	1–1	0–4		2–3	5–1
Rangers	3–0	1–4	0–2	1–4		2–3
Spartans	0–2	1–1	0–9	3–2	6–3	

Updated to match(es) played on 3 November 2013. Source: Scottish Women's FA
Legend: Blue = home team win; Yellow = draw; Red = away team win.

==== Bottom six ====
Home \ Away	BUC	FAL	FFM	HAM	HUT	KWG
Buchan LFC		8–0	1–6	1–2	3–3	5–1
Falkirk	2–0		1–3	2–4	3–2	1–2
Forfar Farmington	3–0	2–1		1–2	4–1	8–0
Hamilton Academical	6–1	7–2	2–2		5–2	7–1
Hutchison Vale	5–1	0–3 (Note: Match awarded to Falkirk by 3–0 score as Hutchison Vale fielded an ineligible player.)	2–4	0–2		7–0
Kilwinning SC Ladies	1–3	4–3	1–11	0–6	2–6	

Updated to match(es) played on 3 November 2013. Source: Scottish Women's FA
Legend: Blue = home team win; Yellow = draw; Red = away team win.
