= 2012 Scottish Women's Premier League =

Scottish Women's Premier League
- Season: 2012
- Champions: Glasgow City (7th title)
- Relegated: FC Kilmarnock; Inverness City
- Champions League: Glasgow City
- Matches: 126
- Goals: 681 (5.4 per match)
- Biggest home win: Hibernian 19–1 FC Kilmarnock; 29 April 2012
- Biggest away win: Hutchison Vale 0–15 Glasgow City; 3 June 2012
- Highest scoring: Hibernian 19–1 FC Kilmarnock; 29 April 2012

The 2012 Women's Premier League was the eleventh season of the Scottish Women's Premier League, the highest division of women's football in Scotland since the SWPL's inception in 2002.

A total of twelve teams contested the league. Aberdeen won the 2011 Scottish Women's First Division and returned to the Premier League after one season away. First Division runners-up Hibernian 2000 were unable to be promoted, as league rules stipulated each club could field only one team in the Premier League. Because the third-placed side in the First Division, Toryglen, folded over the close season, FC Kilmarnock were spared relegation and competed in 2012.

Glasgow City won the championship by a 16-point margin and qualified for the 2013–14 Champions League. This was Glasgow City's sixth title in a row, and their seventh overall. They also won the 2012 Scottish Women's Premier League Cup and the 2012 Scottish Women's Cup to complete the 'treble' (the second in their history after 2008–09), and would have completed a second consecutive perfect season in the SWPL but for having fielded an ineligible player in a match against Forfar, with the result amended from a 5–0 victory to a 3–0 defeat. Forfar Farmington were runners-up, finishing one point in front of both Celtic and Hibernian. Inverness City and FC Kilmarnock were relegated.

== New format ==
The SWPL ran in a new format from this season, with a split division. The 12 clubs faced each other once (11 games per club), after which the league split into top-six and bottom-six sections, based on league position. Each club then played home and away against clubs in their respective sections to give a total of 21 games.

== Teams ==
=== Stadia and locations ===
Locations of teams in the 2012 Premier League

The most regular home ground is shown though some clubs play matches at other venues throughout the season.

Team	Location	Home ground	Head coach	Finishing position 2011
Aberdeen	Aberdeen	Aberdeen Sports Village	Jockie Lawrence	SWFL First Division, 1st
Celtic	Glasgow	Celtic Training Centre, Lennoxtown	Robert Docherty	4th
Falkirk	Falkirk	Westfield Park, Denny	Alan Palmer	10th
Forfar Farmington	Forfar	Station Park	Mark Nisbet	5th
Glasgow City	Glasgow	Petershill Park	Eddie Wolecki-Black	1st
Hamilton Academical	Hamilton	John Cumming Stadium, Carluke	Kevin Murphy	6th
Hibernian	Edinburgh	Albyn Park, Broxburn	Willie Kirk	3rd
Hutchison Vale	Edinburgh	Saughton Enclosure	Ian Macdonald	9th
Inverness City	Inverness	Bught Park	Sandy Corcoran	8th
FC Kilmarnock Ladies	Kilmarnock	Blair Park, Hurlford	Martin Kirkland	11th
Rangers	Glasgow	Petershill Park	John Joyce	7th
Spartans	Edinburgh	Spartans Academy	Debbi McCulloch	2nd

== League standings ==
Pos	Team	Pld	W	D	L	GF	GA	GD	Pts	Qualification or relegation
1	Glasgow City (C, Q)	21	20	0	1	143	10	+133	60	2013–14 Champions League
2	Forfar Farmington	21	14	2	5	50	23	+27	44	
3	Celtic	21	14	1	6	72	19	+53	43	
4	Hibernian	21	14	1	6	80	31	+49	43	
5	Spartans	21	8	2	11	42	49	−7	26	
6	Aberdeen	21	5	1	15	18	94	−76	16	
7	Hamilton Academical	21	10	6	5	74	42	+32	36	
8	Hutchison Vale	21	9	3	9	61	65	−4	30	
9	Rangers	21	7	3	11	37	41	−4	24	
10	Falkirk	21	7	2	12	36	71	−35	23	
11	Inverness City (R)	21	4	3	14	38	87	−49	15	Relegation to SWFL First Division
12	FC Kilmarnock Ladies (R)	21	1	2	18	23	142	−119	5	Relegation to SWFL First Division

Source: Scottish Women's FA
Rules for classification: 1) Points; 2) Goal difference; 3) Number of goals scored
(C) Champions; (Q) Qualified for the phase indicated; (R) Relegated

== Results ==
=== Matches 1–11 ===
Clubs play each other once.

Home \ Away	ABD	CEL	FAL	KLM	FFM	GLC	HAM	HIB	HUT	INV	RAN	SPA
Aberdeen					1–1		1–0	1–2		3–2		1–2
Celtic	6–1		9–0			1–3		5–2	6–2			3–0
Falkirk	2–1				1–3	0–8		0–5	1–1		4–3	
FC Kilmarnock Ladies	0–2	0–8	2–5			1–15			2–5		1–1	
Forfar Farmington		1–0		10–0		0–6			2–1	8–0	0–0	
Glasgow City	9–0						7–0	5–1		11–0		9–0
Hamilton Academical		0–4	3–3	3–0 (Note: Match awarded to Hamilton by 3–0 score as Kilmarnock could not fulfil fixture.)	1–2				2–2		2–2	
Hibernian				19–1	1–0		6–1			2–0		2–0
Hutchison Vale	2–3					0–15		0–8		3–2		1–3
Inverness City		0–6	2–1	3–3			1–1				1–6	
Rangers	1–2	0–3				1–3		1–4	4–3			
Spartans			11–1	5–0	0–2		4–4			2–2	3–0 (Note: 3–0 victory awarded to Spartans by SFA decision. Match finished 2–2.)	

Updated to match(es) played on 24 June 2012. Source: Scottish Women's FA
Legend: Blue = home team win; Yellow = draw; Red = away team win.

=== Matches 12–21 ===
After 11 matches, the league splits into top six and bottom six sections. Clubs will play every other club in their section twice (home and away).

==== Top six ====
Home \ Away	ABD	CEL	FFM	GLC	HIB	SPA
Aberdeen		1–6	0–3	1–14	0–8	0–5
Celtic	7–0		2–0	0–2	0–0	0–1
Forfar Farmington	1–0	2–3		3–0 (Note: 3–0 victory awarded to Forfar by SFA decision due to Glasgow City fielding an ineligible player. Match had finished 0–5.)	4–1	4–0
Glasgow City	12–0	2–0	4–0		3–1	5–0
Hibernian	8–0	2–0	0–1	1–8		3–1
Spartans	3–0	0–3	2–3	0–2	0–4	

Updated to match(es) played on 4 November 2012. Source: Scottish Women's FA
Legend: Blue = home team win; Yellow = draw; Red = away team win.

==== Bottom six ====
Home \ Away	FAL	HAM	HUT	INV	KLM	RAN
Falkirk		1–4	1–2	3–2	5–1	0–1
Hamilton Academical	3–0		5–2	10–1	7–1	5–0
Hutchison Vale	5–1	3–3		6–0	8–1	3–1
Inverness City	0–3	1–8	2–6		8–0	0–3
FC Kilmarnock Ladies	2–4	1–9	2–6	2–10		3–0 (Note: 3–0 victory awarded to Kilmarnock by SFA decision. Match finished 0–10.)
Rangers	3–0	0–3	1–0	0–1	9–0	

Updated to match(es) played on 4 November 2012. Source: Scottish Women's FA
Legend: Blue = home team win; Yellow = draw; Red = away team win.
Notes:

Forfar Farmington's awarded 3–0 win over Glasgow City was the champion club's first League defeat since 2008–09.

=== Top scorers ===
As of 22:00, 7 October 2012 (GMT)

Rank	Player	Club	Goals
1	(Scotland) Jane Ross	Glasgow City	20
2	(Scotland) Suzanne Grant	Celtic	18
2	(Scotland) Emma Mitchell	Glasgow City	18
2	(Scotland) Leanne Ross	Glasgow City	18
5	(Scotland) Lisa Evans	Glasgow City	16
6	(Scotland) Natalie Bodiam	Inverness City	13
7	(Scotland) Hayley Cunningham	Celtic	12
8	(Scotland) Jennifer Callaghan^{1}	Rangers / Glasgow City	11
9	(Scotland) Sarah Ewens	Spartans	10
9	(Scotland) Laura Gavin	Hutchison Vale	10
9	(Scotland) Joanne Love	Glasgow City	10
9	(Scotland) Katherine Smart	Hutchison Vale	10

^{1} 9 goals for Rangers, 2 goals for Glasgow City.
