= Christie Harrison-Murray =

Scottish footballer (born 1990)

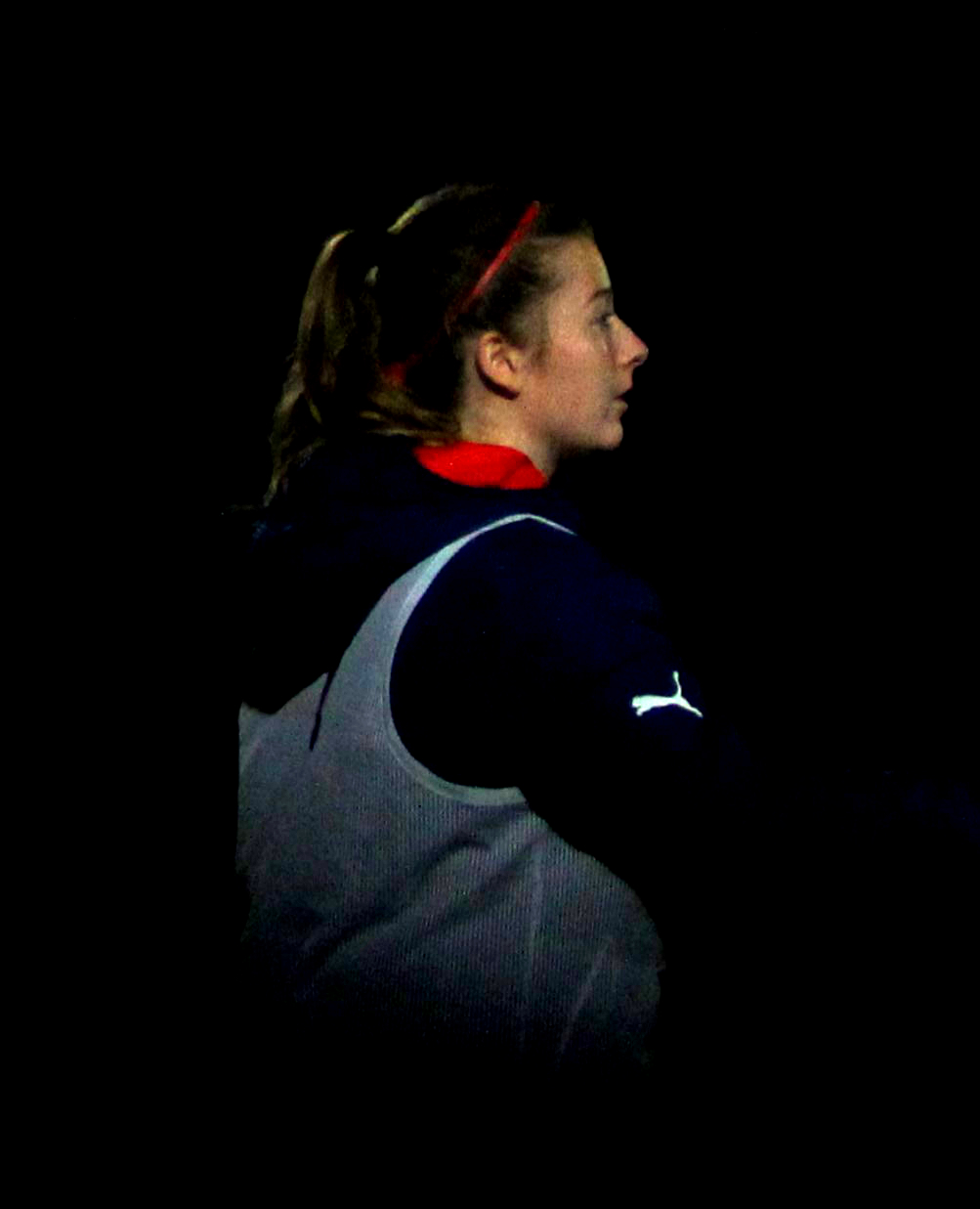

Personal information
- Full name: Christie Harrison-Murray
- Birth name: Christie Murray
- Date of birth: 3 May 1990 (age 36)
- Place of birth: Bellshill, Scotland
- Height: 1.56 m (5 ft 1 in)
- Position: Midfielder

Team information
- Current team: Burnley
- Number: 10

Youth career
- Baillieston Girls

College career
Years	Team	Apps	(Gls)
2006	Carson–Newman Eagles		

Senior career*
Years	Team	Apps	(Gls)
2007	Queen's Park		
2007–2011	Celtic		
2011–2013	Glasgow City	29	(24)
2014	Arsenal	3	(0)
2015	Bristol Academy	14	(1)
2016	Celtic		
2016–2017	Doncaster Rovers Belles	26	(7)
2018–2020	Liverpool	36	(0)
2020–2026	Birmingham City	136	(9)
2026–	Burnley	0	(0)

International career^{‡}
2007	Scotland U17	1	(2)
2007–2009	Scotland U19	17	(5)
2010–	Scotland	81	(5)
- * Club domestic league appearances and goals as of 00:58, 6 November 2024 (UTC) ‡ National team caps and goals as of 17:42, 2 May 2026 (UTC)

Christie Harrison-Murray (née Murray, born 3 May 1990) is a Scottish professional footballer who plays as midfielder for Women's Super League 2 club Burnley. Since making her debut in 2010, Harrison-Murray has won eighty-one caps for the Scotland national team.

== Club career ==
While playing for the Scotland under-17s, Harrison-Murray was scouted by Carson–Newman College. Aged 16, she moved to Jefferson City, Tennessee on a soccer scholarship and scored six goals for the Eagles. Harrison-Murray started her club career with Queen's Park, before joining Celtic in 2007. On 13 May 2010, she scored twice in the Scottish Women's Premier League Cup final, as the team won their first trophy with a 4–1 victory over Spartans.

After four years with Celtic, Harrison-Murray signed for Glasgow City on 23 January 2011. She helped the club reach the 2012 Champions League's round of 16. Two years later, Harrison-Murray played in City's round of 16 defeat by Arsenal. She impressed the English club's Scottish manager Shelley Kerr who swooped to sign her in January 2014.

Harrison-Murray left Arsenal after the 2014 season as her contract ended. In February 2015, she signed a contract with Bristol Academy, after impressing during a trial period with the club. When Bristol were relegated at the end of the 2015 season, Harrison-Murray was one of several players to depart.

Harrison-Murray re-signed with Celtic prior to the start of the 2016 Scottish Women's Premier League season and she made her debut in their historic first match at Celtic Park against Rangers on 13 April 2016, scoring the fifth goal in the 5–1 victory. During her second spell with the Glasgow side, she scored three goals as she helped them move into third place in the league table.

Harrison-Murray returned to the FA WSL with Doncaster Rovers Belles in July 2016. On 24 July 2016, she made her debut in a 4–0 loss to Chelsea. In the 2016 season, she made 12 appearances in all competitions. She went on to make two appearances in the 2016–17 FA Women's Cup and finish the FA WSL Spring Series with 3 goals in 9 appearances. She scored 8 goals in 10 games in all competitions at the beginning of the 2017–18 season and was named FA WSL 2 Player of the Month in November 2017. In December 2017, she announced her departure from the club. During the winter break, she re-signed with Glasgow City.

On 14 July 2018, Harrison-Murray joined Liverpool on a two-year contract and was given the number 10 shirt. Harrison-Murray left Liverpool at the end of the 2020 WSL season.

In the summer of 2020, Harrison-Murray joined Birmingham City in the FA WSL, and was given the captain's armband and the number 10 shirt. Harrison-Murray now has over 130 and counting appearances in Royal Blue

On 25 April 2024, Harrison-Murray was named PFA Community Champion.

On 10 July 2026, Harrison-Murray joined Burnley.

== International career ==
In 2009, Harrison-Murray began attending bogies the Scottish Football Association National Performance Centre at the University of Stirling.

After captaining the under-19 team, including at the 2008 UEFA Women's Under-19 Championship, she made her senior debut in a 3–0 loss to New Zealand at the Cyprus Cup on 1 March 2010. Her first goal for the senior side came on 5 April 2012, coming off the bench to score the winner in a 2–1 victory against the Republic of Ireland at Tynecastle Stadium in the 2013 UEFA Euro qualifiers.

Harrison-Murray was part of the squad that was called up to the UEFA Women's Euro 2017.

Harrison-Murray was part of the squad that was called up to the 2019 FIFA Women's World Cup.

Harrison-Murray has 82 senior caps, most notably being named in both the Women's Euros squad in 2017 and Women's World Cup Squad 2019. Coming off the bench in the last warm up match before the 2017 tournament to score the winner against Republic of Ireland. Christie was named in the starting 11 in Scotlands first ever World Cup game against England.

== Personal life ==
In the summer of 2023, ahead of the 2023–24 Women's Championship season, Harrison-Murray married Meghan Harrison-Murray and changed her surname.

== Career statistics ==
=== International ===
As of the match played on 5 April 2024

National team	Year	Apps	Goals
Scotland	2010	3	0
Scotland	2011	11	0
Scotland	2012	7	1
Scotland	2013	4	1
Scotland	2014	8	0
Scotland	2015	7	1
Scotland	2016	1	0
Scotland	2017	9	1
Scotland	2018	7	0
Scotland	2019	6	1
Scotland	2020	5	0
Scotland	2021	3	0
Scotland	2022	7	0
Scotland	2023	2	0
Scotland	2024	1	0
Total		81	5

Scores and results list Scotland's goal tally first, score column indicates score after each Harrison-Murray goal.

List of international goals scored by Christie Harrison-Murray
No.	Date	Venue	Opponent	Score	Result	Competition
1	5 April 2012	Tynecastle Stadium, Edinburgh, Scotland	Republic of Ireland	2–1	2–1	2013 UEFA Women's Championship qualification
2	18 December 2013	Estádio Nacional Mané Garrincha, Brasília, Brazil	Chile	2–1	3–4	2013 Torneio Internacional de Brasília de Futebol Feminino
3	9 March 2015	GSZ Stadium, Larnaca, Cyprus	South Korea	2–1	2–1	2015 Cyprus Cup
4	7 July 2017	Stark's Park, Kirkcaldy, Scotland	Republic of Ireland	1–0	1–0	Friendly
5	8 November 2019	Elbasan Arena, Elbasan, Albania	Albania	5–0	5–0	UEFA Women's Euro 2021 qualification

== Honours ==
Celtic

- Scottish Women's Premier League Cup: 2010

Glasgow City

- Scottish Women's Premier League: 2011, 2012, 2013
- Scottish Women's Premier League Cup: 2012, 2013
- Scottish Women's Cup: 2011, 2012, 2013

Birmingham City

- Women's Super League 2: 2025–26

Individual

- FA WSL 2 Player of the Month: November 2017
