= Leanne Crichton =

Scottish footballer

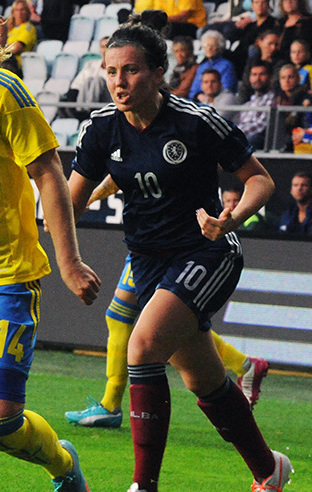
- Crichton playing for Scotland in 2014

Personal information
- Date of birth: 6 August 1987 (age 39)
- Place of birth: Glasgow, Scotland
- Height: 1.70 m (5 ft 7 in)
- Position: Midfielder

Team information
- Current team: Rangers (head coach)

Youth career
- Cumbernauld Cosmos

Senior career*
Years	Team	Apps	(Gls)
- Whitehill Welfare/Edinburgh Ladies
2007	Glasgow City		
2007–2011	Celtic		
2011-2012	Hibernian	18	(11)
2012–2014	Glasgow City	36+	(4+)
2015–2017	Notts County	28	(0)
2017–2021	Glasgow City	34	(8)
2021–2023	Motherwell	28	(2)

International career^{‡}
2006–2020	Scotland	72	(3)

Managerial career
- 2025–: Rangers
- * Club domestic league appearances and goals as of 1 May 2023 ‡ National team caps and goals as of 8 February 2021

Leanne Crichton (born 6 August 1987) is a Scottish professional football manager and former player. She currently manages Rangers and works as a media pundit for BBC Scotland.

As a midfielder, she played for Hibernian, Celtic, Whitehill Welfare/Edinburgh Ladies, Glasgow City (three spells) and Motherwell in Scotland and for Notts County in the English FA WSL, and appeared 72 times for the Scotland national team.

== Playing career ==
=== Club ===
Crichton started her career with Cumbernauld Cosmos before moving to Whitehill Welfare. She had a short spell with Glasgow City in 2007 before moving on to Celtic later the same year, scoring a penalty on her debut against then reigning league champions Hibernian. Crichton went on to join Hibernian in 2011 for one season before returning for her second spell at Glasgow City in January 2012.

After winning a clean sweep of domestic honours with City in 2012, including a league campaign in which the club finished undefeated, Crichton made her bow in the UEFA Women's Champions League against ŽNK Osijek in the qualifying round of the 2012–13 competition. She went on to play in all five matches in City's run to the round of 32.

Crichton signed for FA WSL side Notts County in January 2015. In April 2017, she joined Glasgow City for a third spell with the club. She moved to Motherwell in 2021 to combine a playing and coaching role. She retired from playing in 2023 but remained as a coach at Motherwell for another year.

=== International ===
Crichton was part of Tony Gervaise's Scotland youth squad which qualified for the finals of the 2005 UEFA Women's Under-19 Championship in Hungary. While playing for the Edinburgh Ladies, she earned her first call up to the senior Scotland women's squad in August 2006 and made her debut in a challenge match against Belgium the following month.

National coach Anna Signeul recalled Crichton for Scotland's two challenge matches against the United States in February 2013. Crichton helped Scotland qualify for Euro 2017 and the 2019 World Cup, which was their first appearances in those major tournaments. She announcement her retirement from international football in January 2021, having made 72 international appearances in total.

==== International goals ====
Results list Scotland's goal tally first.

#	Date	Venue	Opponent	Result	Competition	Scored
1	1 June 2013	Laugardalsvöllur, Reykjavík	Iceland	3–2	Friendly	1
2	5 April 2014	Fir Park, Motherwell	Poland	2–0	2015 FIFA Women's World Cup qual.	1
3	13 September 2014	Fir Park, Motherwell	Faroe Islands	9–0	2015 FIFA Women's World Cup qual.	1

== Managerial career ==
=== Motherwell and Glasgow City ===
Crichton moved to Motherwell in 2021 to combine a playing and coaching role. She left Motherwell in November 2024 to become assistant to Leanne Ross at Glasgow City following the departure of Scott Booth.

=== Rangers ===
On 4 August 2025, Crichton entered management as head coach of Rangers, signing a three-year contract as successor to Jo Potter.

== Managerial statistics ==
As of 21 October 2026

Team	Nat	From	To	Record				
Team	Nat	From	To	G	W	D	L	Win %
Rangers	(Scotland)	4 August 2025	present	47	34	4	9	72.34
Total				47	34	4	9	72.34

== Honours ==
=== Celtic ===
- Scottish Women’s Premier League Cup: 2010

=== Hibernian ===
- Scottish Women’s Premier League Cup: 2011

=== Glasgow City ===
- Scottish Women’s Premier League: 2012, 2013, 2017, 2018, 2019, 2020–21
- Scottish Women’s Cup: 2012, 2013, 2019
- Scottish Women’s Premier League Cup: 2012, 2013, 2014

== Personal life ==
She graduated in 2022 from Staffordshire University with a First class degree in Professional Sports Writing and Broadcasting.
