= Julia Ralph Scott =

Scottish footballer (born 1982)

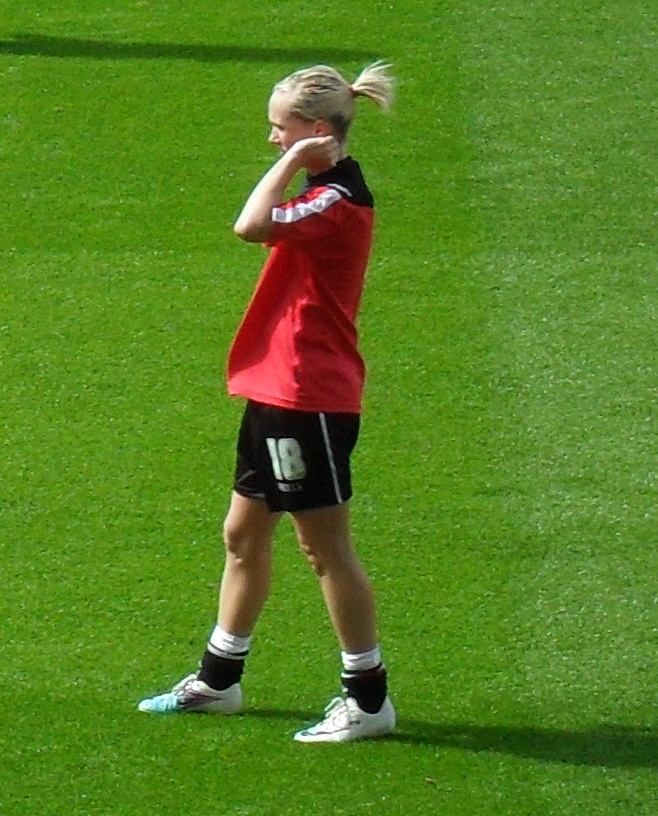

Personal information
- Date of birth: 27 November 1982 (age 43)
- Place of birth: Inverness, Scotland
- Height: 5 ft 3 in (1.60 m)
- Position: Winger

Team information
- Current team: Forfar Farmington

Youth career
- Nairn Boys Club
- Elgin
- Lossiemouth Ladies

College career
Years	Team	Apps	(Gls)
2004	Fairleigh Dickinson University		

Senior career*
Years	Team	Apps	(Gls)
–2003	Hibernian		
2005	Toronto Lynx		
2005–2008	Aberdeen		
2008–2011	Celtic Ladies		
2011–	Forfar Farmington		
2011	Doncaster Rovers Belles	5	(0)

International career^{‡}
2000–	Scotland	14	(3)
- * Club domestic league appearances and goals as of 12:00, 31 August 2011 (UTC) ‡ National team caps and goals as of 12:00, 22 June 2011 (UTC)

Julia Ralph Scott (born 27 November 1982) is a Scottish female international football midfielder. She currently plays for Scottish Women's championship team Inverness Caledonian Thistle Women, having previously played in the FA WSL for Doncaster Rovers Belles. Ralph Scott made her senior Scotland debut in 2000 and made 14 appearances for the national team.

== Club career ==
Ralph Scott graduated from Edinburgh Napier University in July 2004. That summer she played for Hibernian in the UEFA Women's Cup before departing to Fairleigh Dickinson University.

While playing varsity soccer, Ralph Scott was coached by Hubert Busby, Jr. who recommended her to W-League outfit Toronto Lady Lynx.

After returning to Scotland Ralph Scott featured for Aberdeen, Celtic Ladies and Forfar Farmington before signing for English FA WSL club Doncaster Rovers Belles in July 2011. At the culmination of the 2011 FA WSL season, Ralph Scott returned to Forfar Farmington. She currently plays for home town team Inverness Caledonian Thistle

== International career ==
In September 2000, while playing for Elgin, 17-year–old Ralph Scott was called up to the senior Scotland squad for the first time. She travelled with the team for a friendly in the Netherlands. She had previously won 20 Under–18 caps and five at Under–16 level.

Ralph Scott won an eventual 14 caps at senior level before departing to America.

== Personal life ==
Ralph Scott was an accomplished ballerina during her younger years. She is nicknamed Ralphi.
