= Emma Mukandi =

Scottish footballer

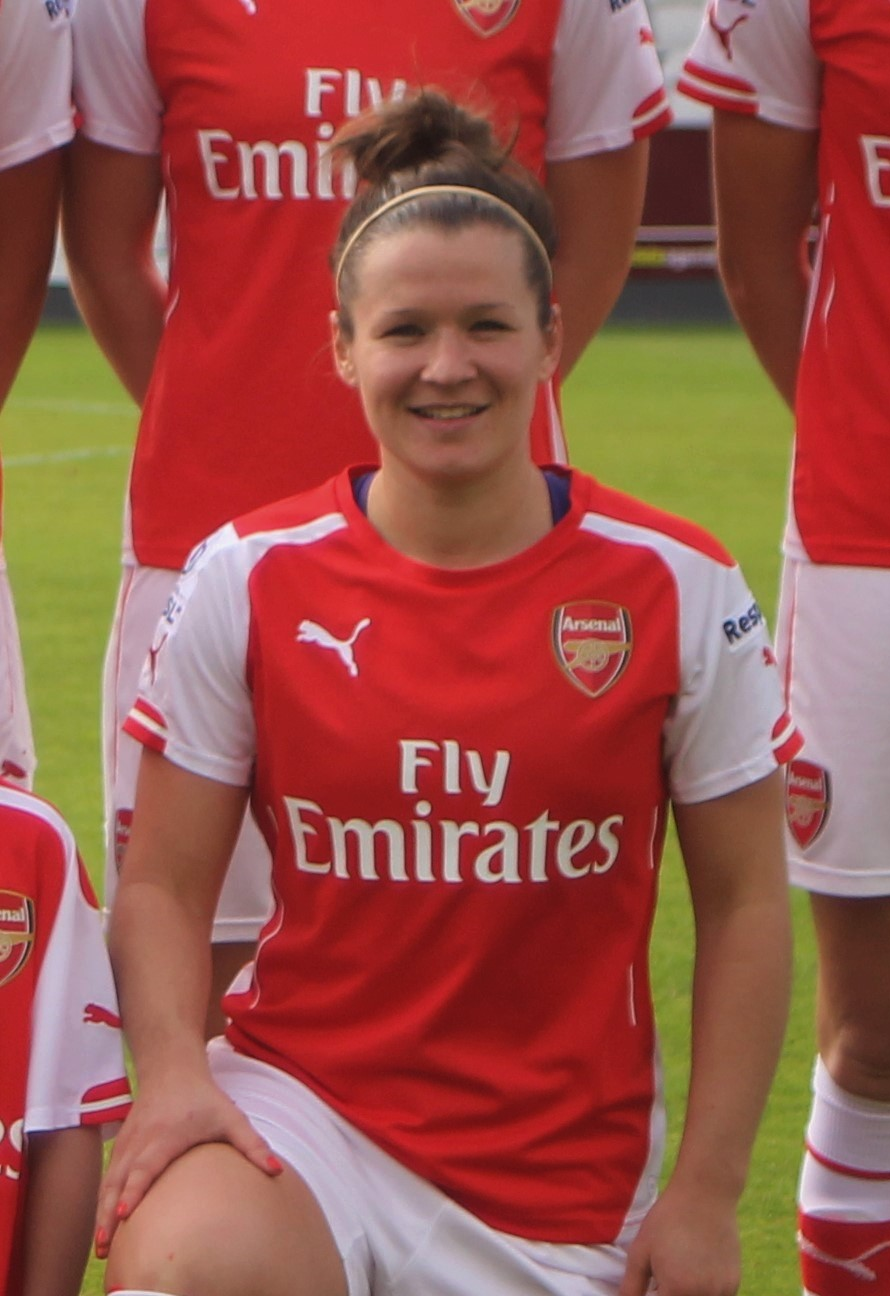
- Emma Mukandi in 2014

Personal information
- Birth name: Emma Mitchell
- Date of birth: 19 September 1992 (age 34)
- Place of birth: Kirkcaldy, Scotland
- Height: 1.65 m (5 ft 5 in)
- Position: Left-back

Youth career
- St. Johnstone Girls

Senior career*
Years	Team	Apps	(Gls)
2008–2012	Glasgow City	35	(38)
2013	SGS Essen	11	(1)
2013–2020	Arsenal	74	(3)
2020	→ Tottenham Hotspur (loan)	4	(2)
2020–2023	Reading	35	(0)
2023–2025	London City Lionesses	37	(2)

International career^{‡}
2007–2008	Scotland U17	9	(2)
2009–2011	Scotland U19	22	(3)
2011–	Scotland	74	(7)
- * Club domestic league appearances and goals as of 20 April 2025 ‡ National team caps and goals as of 20 April 2025

Emma Mukandi (née Mitchell; born 19 September 1992) is a Scottish former professional footballer who last played for FA WC club London City Lionesses. She began her senior career with Glasgow City then joined Frauen-Bundesliga club SGS Essen. Primarily a defender, Mukandi has also played as a forward. Mukandi also plays for the Scotland national team.

== Club career ==
Born in Kirkcaldy, she grew up in the town of Buckhaven, Fife. Mukandi went on to become the only girl to play for her local high school team at the age of twelve. She started her career with St Johnstone Girls, alongside fellow future Frauen-Bundesliga player Lisa Evans, before both girls joined Scottish Women's Premier League champions Glasgow City in August 2008.

At the end of the 2012 season, Mukandi had a trial period in Denmark with earlier Champions League opponents Fortuna Hjørring, before heading for further trials in Sweden and Germany.

Mukandi signed professionally for Frauen-Bundesliga side SGS Essen in January 2013. After just four months, reports in Germany linked Mukandi with a transfer to English champions Arsenal. Arsenal confirmed the move on 22 July 2013.

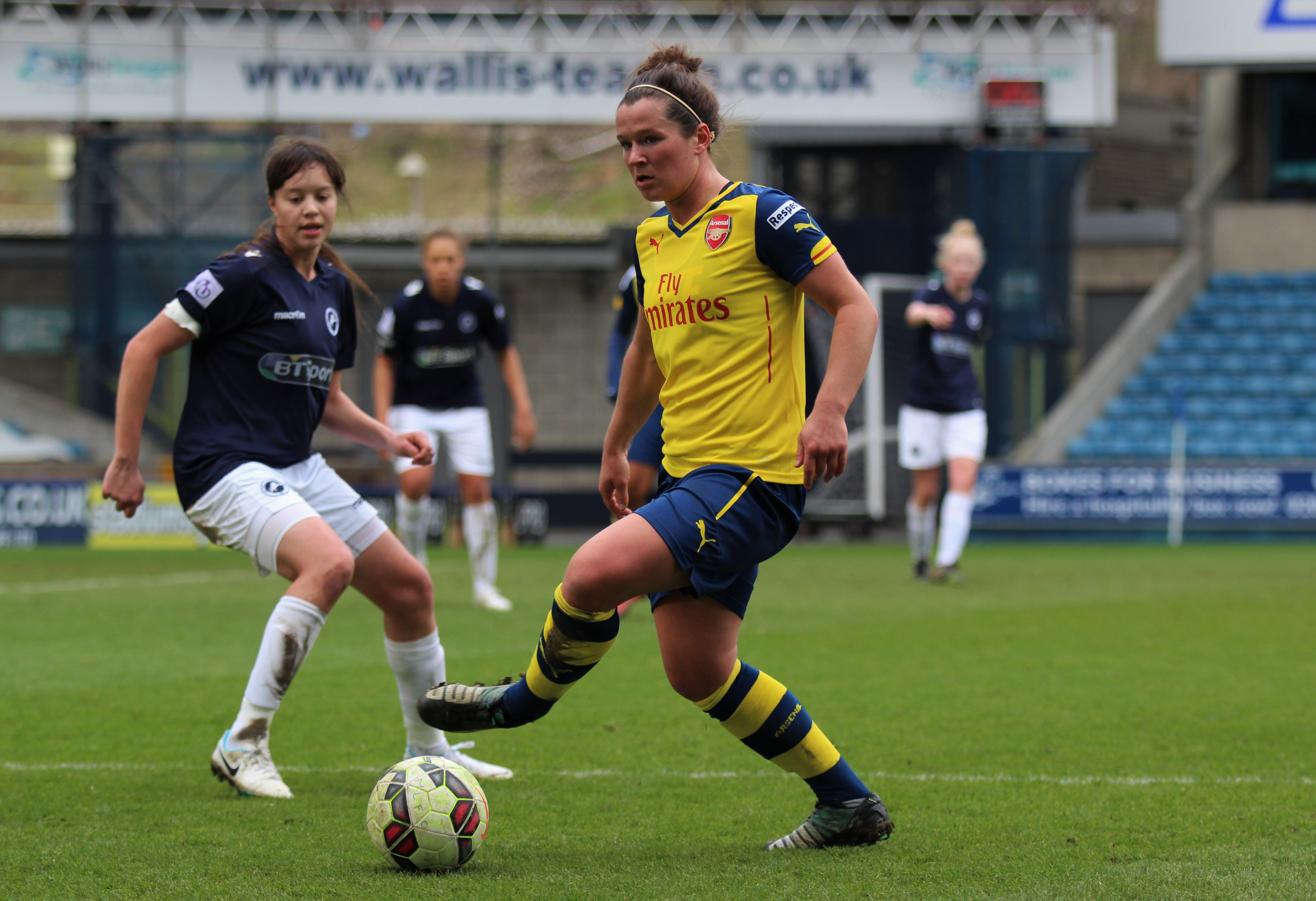
Emma Mukandi with Arsenal

=== Arsenal ===
Whilst at Arsenal, Mukandi won an FA Cup in 2014 with WSL Cups coming in 2013 and 2015. With the Gunners, she also went on a successful run to the FA Cup final of 2016. Arsenal beat Chelsea 1–0 at Wembley and Mukandi lifted the 2016 FA Cup.

Mukandi made her 100th appearance for Arsenal in a 4–3 win over West Ham United in September 2018.

On 3 January 2020, it was announced that Mukandi would be joining Tottenham Hotspur on loan for the rest of the season.

=== Reading ===
On 15 July 2020, Reading announced the signing of Mukandi from Arsenal. On 20 July 2022, Reading announced that Mukandi had returned to the club and signed a one-year contract, following the birth of her daughter. On 7 September 2022, Reading announced that Mukandi was their new club captain. Following the club's relegation from the Women's Super League to the Women's Championship, Mukandi announced that she would be leaving Reading.

=== London City Lionesses ===
On 17 August 2023 London City Lionesses announced that they had signed Mukandi on a 2-year contract. On 9 August 2025, Mukandi announced her retirement.

== International career ==
After captaining both the national Under-17 and Under-19 teams, Mukandi made her debut with the senior Scottish national team against France in May 2011. Despite conceding a penalty in Scotland's 1–1 draw, her contribution was praised by coach Anna Signeul: "Emma Mitchell did really well on her first appearance. It is a shame that she conceded the penalty, it was just a bit of inexperience to be honest, but she didn't let her head go down and kept working hard."

Mukandi attended the Scottish Football Association National Performance Centre at the University of Stirling. She scored her first goal for the Senior women's side against Iceland in August 2012 and later that year scored against Spain in a 2013 UEFA Women's Euro Play-off defeat.

She was ruled out of the Scotland squad for UEFA Women's Euro 2017 by a hamstring injury. After injury disrupted her appearances for Arsenal in the 2018–19 season, she was left out of the squad for the 2019 FIFA Women's World Cup in France.

Mukandi was recalled to the Scotland squad in August 2022, as she resumed her playing career after giving birth in November 2021.

== Personal life ==
In October 2019, Mukandi spoke about her struggles with her mental health issues.

Mukandi was left out of the Scotland international squad in June 2021 as she had recently become pregnant. On 28 November 2021, she gave birth to a baby girl.

In August 2022, she married Head of Strength & Conditioning at Ipswich Town, Ivan Mukandi.

== Career statistics ==
=== Club ===
As of match played 27 May 2023

Appearances and goals by club, season and competition
Club	Season	League			National cup		League cup		Continental		Other		Total	
Club	Season	Division	Apps	Goals	Apps	Goals	Apps	Goals	Apps	Goals	Apps	Goals	Apps	Goals
Arsenal	2013	FA Women's Super League	8	0			2	0	4	0	–		8	0
Arsenal	2014	FA Women's Super League	13	0			3	0	2	0	–		13	0
Arsenal	2015	FA Women's Super League	11	0			3	0	–		–		11	0
Arsenal	2016	FA Women's Super League	12	0			2	0	–		–		12	0
Arsenal	2017	FA Women's Super League	0	0	0	0	0	0	–		–		0	0
Arsenal	2017–18	FA Women's Super League	17	1			6	3	–		–		23	4
Arsenal	2018–19	FA Women's Super League	11	1	1	0	3	1	–		–		15	2
Arsenal	2019–20	FA Women's Super League	2	1	0	0	3	1	3	0	–		8	2
Arsenal	Total		74	3	1	0	22	5	9	0	0	0	106	8
Tottenham Hotspur (loan)	2019–20	FA Women's Super League	4	2	2	0	0	0	–		–		6	2
Reading	2020–21	FA Women's Super League	14	0	0	0	3	0	–		–		17	0
Reading	2021–22	FA Women's Super League	0	0	0	0	0	0	–		–		0	0
Reading	2022–23	FA Women's Super League	21	0	3	1	2	0	–		–		26	1
Reading	Total		35	0	3	1	5	0	0	0	0	0	43	1
London City Lionesses	2023–24	Championship	13	1	2	0	3	0	–		–		18	1
Career total			126	6	8	1	30	5	9	0	0	0	173	12

=== International ===
As of the match played on 11 April 2023

Appearances and goals by national team and year
National team	Year	Apps	Goals
Scotland	2011	2	0
Scotland	2012	12	3
Scotland	2013	11	2
Scotland	2014	12	0
Scotland	2015	5	1
Scotland	2016	5	1
Scotland	2017	5	0
Scotland	2018	7	0
Scotland	2019	1	0
Scotland	2020	5	0
Scotland	2021	1	0
Scotland	2022	3	0
Scotland	2023	3	0
Total		72	7

As of match played 10 March 2020
Scores and results list Scotland's goal tally first, score column indicates score after each Mukandi goal.

List of international goals scored by Emma Mukandi
No.	Date	Venue	Opponent	Score	Result	Competition
1	4 August 2012	Cappielow, Greenock, Scotland	Iceland	1–1	1–1	Friendly
2	30 August 2012	East End Park, Dunfermline, Scotland	Norway	1–0	2–2	Friendly
3	24 October 2012	La Ciudad del Fútbol, Las Rozas de Madrid, Spain	Spain	1–0	2–3	UEFA Women's Euro 2013 qualifying
4	8 March 2013	GSZ Stadium, Larnaca, Cyprus	England	4–4	4–4	2013 Cyprus Women's Cup
5	7 April 2013	East End Park, Dunfermline, Scotland	Wales	2–1	2–1	Friendly
6	6 March 2015	GSZ Stadium, Larnaca, Cyprus	Italy	1–2	2–3	2015 Cyprus Women's Cup
7	8 March 2016	Falkirk Stadium, Falkirk, Scotland	Spain	1–0	1–1	Friendly

== Honours ==
Glasgow City

- Scottish Women's Premier League: 2009, 2010, 2011, 2012
- Scottish Women's Cup: 2009, 2011, 2012
- Scottish Women's Premier League Cup: 2009, 2012

Arsenal

- FA WSL: 2018–19
- FA Cup: 2014, 2016
- WSL Cup: 2013, 2015, 2017–18

Individual

- PFA Team of the Year: 2014–15
