= Scottish Women's Football League First Division =

- Divisions: 1 (1999–2015); 2 (2016–2019)
- Number of clubs: 10–24
- Level on pyramid: 2 (1999–2015); 3 (2016–2019)
- Promotion to: Premier/SWPL (1999–2015); SWPL 2 (2016–2019)
- Relegation to: Scottish Women's Football League Second Division
- Domestic cup: Scottish Cup
- League cup: Scottish First Division Cup

The Scottish Women's Football League First Division (SWFL 1) was a division in the Scottish women's football pyramid between 1999 and 2019. It served as the second tier from 1999 to 2015, before becoming the third tier from 2016 until its dissolution in 2019.

For most of its history, the First Division was a national league whose top teams won promotion to the Scottish Women's Premier League (SWPL), while the lowest-placed teams were relegated to the Second Division (SWFL 2). Those divisions operated on the traditional autumn–spring football season calendar until 2009, when they switched to a March–November schedule.

From 2016 to 2019, SWFL 1 was split into North and South regional divisions, with one team from each division promoted to SWPL 2. In the 2020 season, SWFL 1 was replaced as the third tier by the Scottish Women's Football Championship.

== History ==
=== Champions ===
- 1999–00: Queen of the South OR Elgin City (both won promotion)
- 2000–01: Raith Rovers
- 2001–02: Inver-Ross
- 2002–03: East Kilbride
- 2003–04: Aberdeen
- 2004–05: Forfar Farmington
- 2005–06: Lochee United
- 2006–07: Queen's Park
- 2008–09: Rangers W.F.C.
- 2009: Celtic Reserves
- 2010: Celtic Reserves
- 2011: Aberdeen
- 2012: Hibernian Reserves
- 2013: Queen's Park
- 2014: Falkirk Ladies
- 2015: Glasgow Girls F.C. Seniors

== Seasons ==
=== 1999–2009 ===
Queen of the South and Elgin City both won promotion to the Premier Division in 1999-00. Raith Rovers won the 2000–01 First Division with 44 points, four ahead of Clyde and Shettleston. The member clubs in 2000–01 were:

- Aberdeen
- Albion Rovers
- Clyde
- Dundee United
- East Kilbride
- Forfar Farmington
- Hamilton
- Raith Rovers
- Shettleston
- St Johnstone

Promoted in 2001–02 were F.C. Hamilton and the champions Inver-Ross L.F.C., who became Ross County L.F.C. in 2003.

East Kilbride won the First Division and promotion in 2002–03, and reached that season's League Cup final.

Aberdeen, Forfar Farmington and Lochee United were the subsequent champions in 2003-04, 2004-05 and 2005-06 respectively.

Queen's Park were the 2006–07 First Division champions and returned to the SWPL (after the club's previous promotion in 2004 and relegation in 2006).

In 2007–08, the promotion-winners were Dundee United S.C. and Dalkeith Ladies (Boroughmuir Thistle), coached by Pauline MacDonald. The First Division clubs in 2007–08 were:

- Bishopbriggs Ladies
- Bo'ness United
- Buchan
- Cowdenbeath Women's
- Dundee United
- Dalkeith Ladies
- Dumfries
- Falkirk
- Hutchison Vale
- Inverness Ladies
- Murieston United
- Paisley City Ladies

Paisley City Ladies became Rangers W.F.C. in 2008–09, and won promotion to the SWPL that season in a ten-team division:

- Bo'ness United
- Celtic 'B'
- Cowdenbeath
- Dumfries
- Falkirk
- Glasgow Ladies A
- Hutchison Vale
- Inverness Ladies
- Rangers
- Tynecastle

=== 2009–2015 ===
Celtic Reserves who won the First Division winners in the 2010 season were ineligible for promotion. As a result, Hutchison Vale and Falkirk LFC were promoted from the SWFL to the SWPL (replacing the relegated Aberdeen LFC). Hearts LFC, Buchan, and Airdrie United were relegated to the SWFL Second Division and were replaced by Scottish Women's Football League Second Division East champions, Hibernian 2000, and two clubs from the Scottish Women's Football League Second Division West, Paisley Saints Ladies and Wishaw Juniors (formerly Motherwell).

Member clubs in the 2011 season:

- Aberdeen
- Celtic Reserves
- Cowdenbeath
- Glasgow City Reserves
- Hibernian 2000
- Paisley Saints Ladies
- Queen's Park
- Raith Rovers
- Toryglen
- Troon
- Wishaw Juniors

Troon Ladies' ground, Portland Park

Aberdeen were the 2011 champions and were promoted to the SWPL. Runners-up, Celtic Reserves were ineligible for promotion while third-placed Toryglen Ladies folded during the close season. Wishaw Juniors had also folded and withdrawn mid-season from the league. To maintain numbers, no sides were relegated from either the Premier League or the First Division in 2011.

Buchan Ladies, Kilwinning Sports Club, Airdrie United, and Forfar Farmington Reserves were promoted from the regional Second Divisions in 2011.

In 2012, the champions and runners-up, Hibernian Reserves and Celtic Reserves, were ineligible for promotion to the SWPL. Third-placed Buchan L.F.C. and fourth-placed Kilwinning SC were subsequently promoted, while the relegated Kilmarnock and Inverness City replaced them in SWFL 1. Dunfermline Athletic, East Fife, Hearts, and Murieston United were promoted from the regional Second Divisions. Hibernian Reserves withdrew to compete in a newly-formed Development League alongside the relegated reserve teams of Glasgow City and Forfar Farmington, and the Second-Division reserve teams of Spartans and Hamilton Academical.

Airdrie United Ladies played in the 2012 First Division but were replaced by Cumbernauld Colts in 2013, after the entire Airdrie squad defected to that club.

Troon Ladies merged with Glasgow Girls and assumed the latter name.

Member clubs in the 2013 season were:

- Celtic Reserves
- Cowdenbeath
- Cumbernauld Colts
- Dunfermline Athletic
- East Fife
- FC Kilmarnock
- Glasgow Girls
- Hearts
- Inverness City
- Murieston United
- Paisley Saints Ladies
- Queen's Park

The next champions of the First Division were Queen's Park (2013) and Falkirk Ladies (2014).

At the end of its last season as a national league in 2015, the First Division had its top four clubs join SWPL 2 (but they remained level 2 league clubs). The 2015 standings were:

- 1st: Glasgow Girls F.C. Seniors
- 2nd: Buchan Ladies
- 3rd: Jeanfield Swifts
- 4th: Queen's Park
- 5th: Cumbernauld Colts
- 6th: Hibernian Development
- 7th: Celtic Academy
- 8th: Mill United
- 9th: East Fife
- 10th: Dunfermline Athletic
- 11th: Boroughmuir Thistle
- 12th: Murieston United

=== 2016 ===
In the first season, after league reconstruction, East Fife won the northern division by 17 points, and Motherwell were SWFL 1 South winners by five points; both were promoted to SWPL 2.

Final standings:

North group:

- 1st: East Fife
- 2nd: Dunfermline Athletic
- 3rd: Central Girls
- 4th: Aberdeen B
- 5th: Forfar Farmington B

South group:

- 1st: Motherwell
- 2nd: Hibernian B
- 3rd: Celtic B
- 4th: Rangers B
- 5th: Kilmarnock

=== 2017 ===
Central Girls Football Academy won the North division by nine points and Kilmarnock won the South division by 20 points. Central had a goal difference of +84 and Kilmarnock +52. Both were promoted to the SWPL 2 for the 2018 season.

Final standings:

North group:

- 1st: Central Girls
- 2nd: Dundee United
- 3rd: Dunfermline Athletic
- 4th: Granite City
- 5th: Inverness Caledonian Thistle

South group:

- 1st: Kilmarnock
- 2nd: Celtic B
- 3rd: Partick Thistle
- 4th: Renfrew
- 5th: Cumbernauld Colts

=== 2018 ===
Member clubs in the 2018 season:

North:

- Aberdeen 23s
- Buchan
- Cove Rangers
- Dee Ladies
- Deveronvale
- Dundee United
- Dunfermline Athletic
- East Fife
- Raith Rovers Ladies
- Inverness City Ladies
- Stirling University Development
- Westdyke Ladies

South:

- Blackburn United
- Boroughmuir Thistle F.C.
- Celtic Academy
- Cumbernauld Colts
- Falkirk
- Hibernian Development
- Morton
- Queen's Park
- Rangers Development
- Renfrew
- Thistle Weir
- Westerlands

Final standings:

North group:

- 1st: Dundee United
- 2nd: East Fife
- 3rd: Inverness Caledonian Thistle
- 4th: Dunfermline Athletic
- 5th: Cove Rangers

South group:

- 1st: Hibernian B
- 2nd: Celtic B
- 3rd: Partick Thistle
- 4th: Queen's Park
- 5th: Westerlands

=== 2019 ===
Member clubs in the 2019 season:

North:

- Aberdeen FC Women
- Buchan L.F.C.
- Cove Rangers
- Deveronvale Ladies
- Dunfermline Athletic
- East Fife
- Inverness Caledonian Thistle FC
- Kelty Hearts
- Montrose
- Raith Rovers Women
- Stonehaven Ladies F.C.
- Westdyke Ladies

Details:

South:

- Ayr United
- Blackburn United
- Boroughmuir Thistle FC
- Celtic Academy
- FC Kilmarnock 23s
- Glasgow City Development
- Hamilton Academical 23s
- Hibernian 23s
- Queens Park L.F.C.
- Rangers Development
- Renfrew Ladies FC
- Spartans Development

Details:

Final standings:

North group:

- 1st: Aberdeen
- 2nd: Inverness Caledonian Thistle
- 3rd: Cove Rangers
- 4th: Buchan
- 5th: Dunfermline Athletic

South group:

- 1st: Glasgow City Development
- 2nd: Celtic Academy
- 3rd: Hibernian 23s
- 4th: Queen's Park
- 5th: Boroughmuir Thistle

== See also ==
- Scottish Women's Football League First Division Cup
- Scottish Women's Football Championship
