= Jane Ross (footballer) =

Scottish footballer (born 1989)

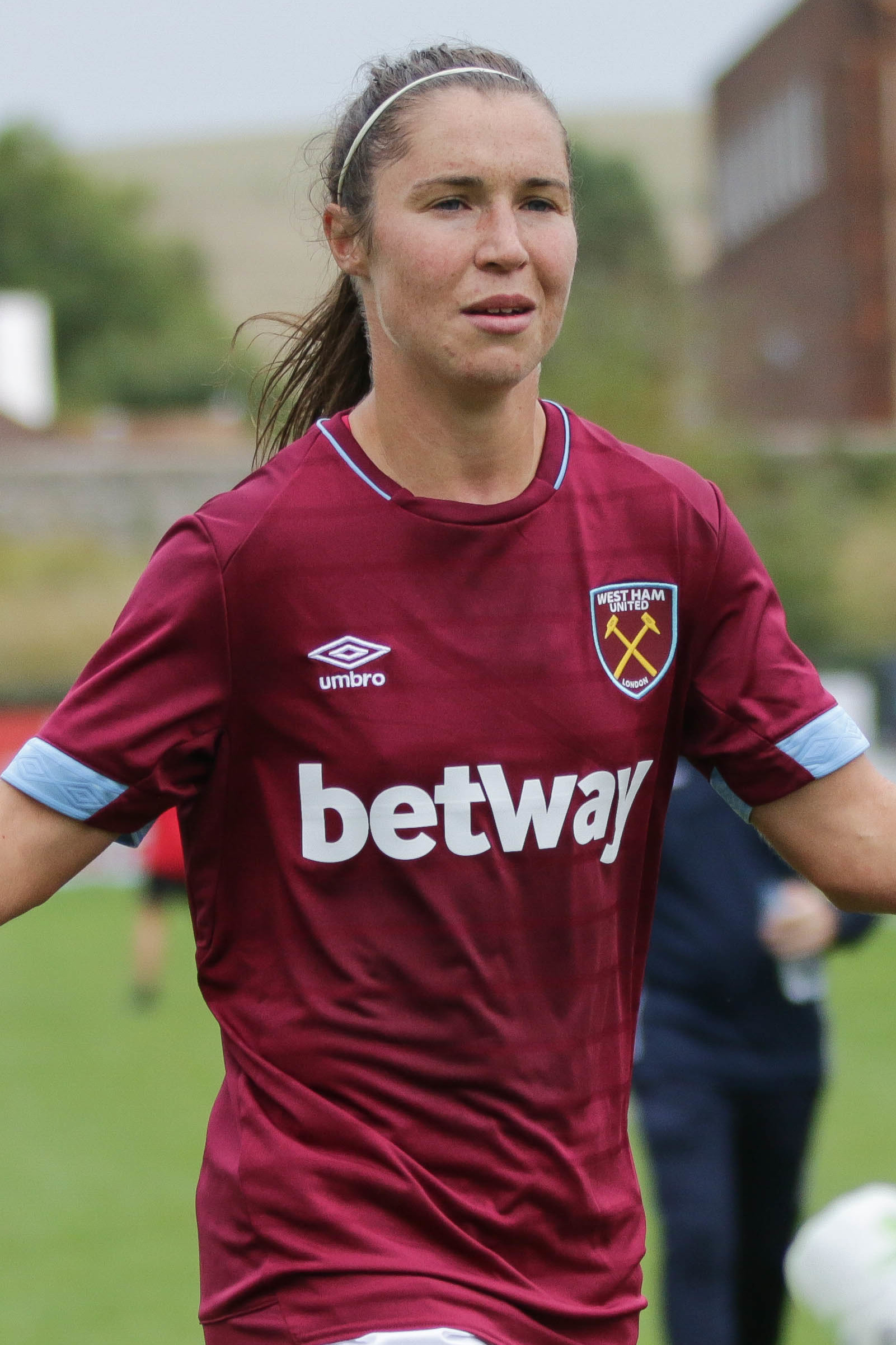
- Ross playing for West Ham in August 2018

Personal information
- Full name: Jane Celestina Ross
- Date of birth: 18 September 1989 (age 37)
- Place of birth: Rothesay, Scotland
- Height: 5 ft 5 in (1.65 m)
- Position: Striker

Youth career
- Paisley Saints Ladies

Senior career*
Years	Team	Apps	(Gls)
2002–2006	Paisley Saints Ladies		
2006–2012	Glasgow City	118	(104)
2013–2015	Vittsjö GIK	67	(36)
2015–2018	Manchester City	35	(11)
2018–2019	West Ham United	23	(9)
2019–2021	Manchester United	31	(5)
2021–2025	Rangers	28	(22)

International career^{‡}
2007–2008	Scotland U19	14	(5)
2009–2025	Scotland	147	(62)
- * Club domestic league appearances and goals as of 10 September 2023 ‡ National team caps and goals as of 29 February 2024

Jane Celestina Ross (born 18 September 1989) is a Scottish former footballer who played as a striker.

== Club career ==
=== Glasgow City ===
Ross grew up on the Isle of Bute and after attending local coaching clinics, began her career at youth level with Paisley Saints Ladies. By the age of 16, she had already been called into the Scotland Women's under-19 squad. In June 2006, she joined Glasgow City, where she won six Scottish Women's Premier League titles, three Scottish Cups and three League Cups. She also helped the club reach the last 16 of the UEFA Women's Champions League in the 2011–12 campaign. In April 2011, Ross scored four goals against Kilmarnock, joining a group of four Glasgow City players to score more than 100 goals for the club. Ross ended her time with Glasgow City having scored 104 goals in 118 matches.

At the end of the 2012 season, Ross had a trial period in Denmark with earlier Champions League opponents Fortuna Hjørring, before heading for further trials with several clubs in Sweden.

=== Vittsjö GIK ===
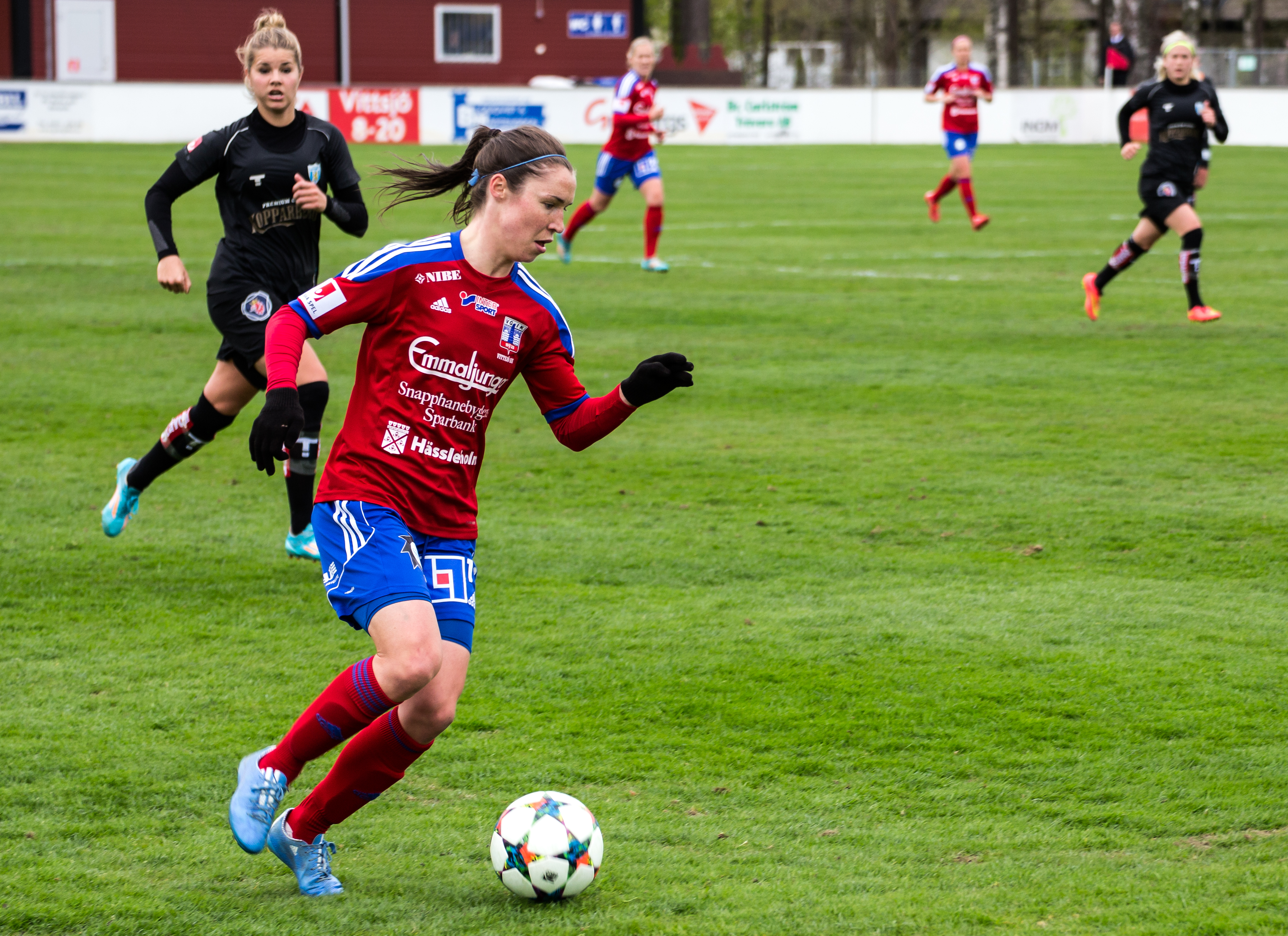
Ross playing for Vittsjö

Ross agreed a professional contract with Vittsjö GIK at the end of December 2012, joining fellow Scotland international Ifeoma Dieke at the club. Ross scored on her debut for Vittsjö in a pre-season friendly match against Danish side B93/HIK/Skjold in February 2013. After 11 goals in her debut season, Ross was linked with a transfer to English FA WSL club Arsenal Ladies. Both Ross and Dieke extended their contracts with Vittsjö for another season in December 2013. Ross left Vittsjö after the 2015 season, having scored 51 goals in 82 appearances for the club.

=== Manchester City ===
Ross signed a two-year contract with Manchester City in November 2015. She left Manchester City after the 2017–18 season, having scored a total of 25 goals in 61 games across all competitions for the club.

=== West Ham United ===
On 9 July 2018, Ross signed with West Ham United ahead of the 2018–19 season. The campaign saw West Ham reach their first ever FA Cup final with Ross scoring the team's opening penalty of the semi-final shootout against Reading. The season was also notable as the subject of the BBC behind-the-scenes documentary Britain's Youngest Football Boss.

=== Manchester United ===
After one season in London, Ross returned to Manchester to sign with newly promoted Manchester United ahead of the 2019–20 season. Ross made her debut for Manchester United against Manchester City in the FA WSL on 7 September 2019, a 1–0 loss in the inaugural Manchester derby. She scored her first goal for the club on 13 October in a 3–0 league win away to Tottenham Hotspur. After two seasons, Ross left at the end of her contract having scored 7 goals in 34 appearances for United in all competitions.

=== Rangers ===
On 6 July 2021, Ross signed for Rangers.

== International career ==
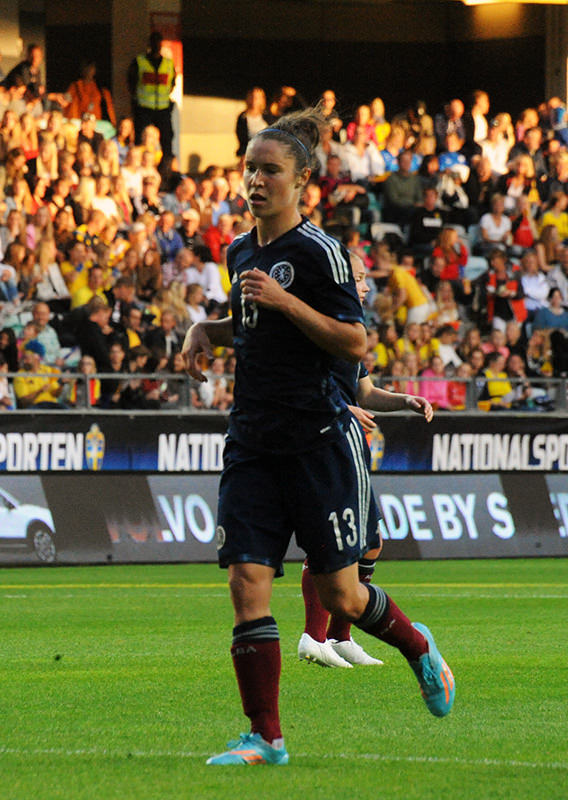
Ross with Scotland

Ross won her first full international cap for Scotland against England in March 2009, and scored her first international goal in August the same year against Denmark. She made her 50th international appearance against the Netherlands in the 2013 Cyprus Cup tournament.

June 2012 saw Ross named one of four reserves to the 18-player Great Britain squad for the 2012 London Olympics.

Ross studied at the University of Stirling on a scholarship as part of the SFA National Women's Football Academy. She has deferred her M.Phil. degree while she pursues her professional career.

== Career statistics ==
=== Club ===
As of match played 16 May 2021.

Appearances and goals by club, season and competition
Club	Season	League			National Cup (Note: Includes the Women's FA Cup)		League Cup (Note: Includes the SWPL Cup and WSL Cup/Women's League Cup)		Europe (Note: Includes the UEFA Women's Champions League)		Total	
Club	Season	Division	Apps	Goals	Apps	Goals	Apps	Goals	Apps	Goals	Apps	Goals
Glasgow City	2011	SWPL 1	20	21	0	0	3	2	6	3	29	26
Glasgow City	2012	SWPL 1	18	27	0	0	4	8	5	2	27	37
Glasgow City	Total		38	48	0	0	7	10	11	5	56	63
Vittsjö GIK	2013	Damallsvenskan	22	11	0	0	0	0	0	0	22	11
Vittsjö GIK	2014	Damallsvenskan	20	10	0	0	0	0	0	0	20	10
Vittsjö GIK	2015	Damallsvenskan	22	7	0	0	0	0	0	0	22	7
Vittsjö GIK	Total		64	28	0	0	0	0	0	0	64	28
Manchester City	2016	WSL 1	16	8	3	2	4	3	0	0	23	13
Manchester City	2017	WSL 1	3	2	0	0	0	0	0	0	3	2
Manchester City	2017–18	WSL 1	13	3	1	0	4	2	0	0	18	5
Manchester City	Total		32	13	4	2	8	5	0	0	44	20
West Ham United	2018–19	WSL	20	7	3	1	5	2	0	0	28	11
Manchester United	2019–20	WSL	11	1	1	0	6	3	0	0	18	4
Manchester United	2020–21	WSL	12	2	2	1	2	0	0	0	16	3
Manchester United	Total		23	3	3	1	8	3	0	0	34	7
Career total			177	99	10	4	28	20	11	5	226	129

=== International appearances ===
Scotland statistics accurate as of match played 11 April 2023.

Year	Scotland	
Year	Apps	Goals
2009	7	2
2010	10	0
2011	11	8
2012	16	3
2013	18	10
2014	15	10
2015	12	9
2016	7	4
2017	14	7
2018	11	4
2019	9	3
2020	5	0
2021	7	2
2022	4	0
Total	146	62

=== International goals ===
As of match played 19 February 2021. Scotland score listed first, score column indicates score after each Ross goal.

No.	Date	Venue	Opponent	Score	Result	Competition
1	14 August 2009	Gladsaxe Stadium, Søborg, Denmark	Denmark	1–4	2–5	Friendly
2	15 October 2009	The Oval, Belfast, Northern Ireland	Northern Ireland	3–0	3–0	Friendly
3	13 February 2011	Bridge Meadow Stadium, Haverfordwest, Wales	Wales	1–0	4–2	Friendly
4	18 May 2011	Stade Francis-Le Blé, Brest, France	France	1–0	1–1	Friendly
5	21 August 2011	Falkirk Stadium, Falkirk, Scotland	Switzerland	1–0	5–0	Friendly
6	21 August 2011	Falkirk Stadium, Falkirk, Scotland	Switzerland	3–0	5–0	Friendly
7	21 September 2011	Tynecastle Stadium, Edinburgh, Scotland	Finland	3–1	7–2	Friendly
8	21 September 2011	Tynecastle Stadium, Edinburgh, Scotland	Finland	5–1	7–2	Friendly
9	12 October 2011	Ness Ziona Stadium, Ness Ziona, Israel	Israel	1–0	6–1	UEFA Euro 2013 qualifying
10	27 October 2011	Tynecastle Stadium, Edinburgh, Scotland	Wales	1–1	2–2	UEFA Euro 2013 qualifying
11	28 February 2012	GSZ Stadium, Larnaca, Cyprus	Canada	1–1	1–5	2012 Cyprus Cup
12	9 May 2012	Stadion Kazimierza Deyny, Starogard Gdański, Poland	Poland	2–1	3–1	Friendly
13	16 June 2012	Tynecastle Stadium, Edinburgh, Scotland	Israel	6–0	8–0	UEFA Euro 2013 qualifying
14	8 March 2013	GSZ Stadium, Larnaca, Cyprus	England	2–2	4–4	2013 Cyprus Cup
15	11 March 2013	GSP Stadium, Nicosia, Cyprus	Italy	1–0	2–1	2013 Cyprus Cup
16	7 April 2013	East End Park, Dunfermline, Scotland	Wales	1–0	2–1	Friendly
17	22 September 2013	Tórsvøllur, Tórshavn, Faroe Islands	Faroe Islands	4–0	7–2	2015 FIFA World Cup qualification
18	26 September 2013	Fir Park, Motherwell, Scotland	Bosnia and Herzegovina	5–0	7–0	2015 FIFA World Cup qualification
19	26 October 2013	Fir Park, Motherwell, Scotland	Northern Ireland	1–0	2–0	2015 FIFA World Cup qualification
20	31 October 2013	Dyskobolia Stadium, Grodzisk Wielkopolski, Poland	Poland	1–0	4–0	2015 FIFA World Cup qualification
21	31 October 2013	Dyskobolia Stadium, Grodzisk Wielkopolski, Poland	Poland	2–0	4–0	2015 FIFA World Cup qualification
22	31 October 2013	Dyskobolia Stadium, Grodzisk Wielkopolski, Poland	Poland	3–0	4–0	2015 FIFA World Cup qualification
23	18 December 2013	Estádio Nacional Mané Garrincha, Brasília, Brazil	Chile	1–1	3–4	2013 International Tournament of Brasília
24	10 March 2014	GSZ Stadium, Larnaca, Cyprus	Australia	2–0	4–2	2014 Cyprus Cup
25	10 March 2014	GSZ Stadium, Larnaca, Cyprus	Australia	3–0	4–2	2014 Cyprus Cup
26	10 March 2014	GSZ Stadium, Larnaca, Cyprus	Australia	4–1	4–2	2014 Cyprus Cup
27	10 April 2014	Bilino Polje, Zenica, Bosnia and Herzegovina	Bosnia and Herzegovina	1–1	3–1	2015 FIFA World Cup qualification
28	10 April 2014	Bilino Polje, Zenica, Bosnia and Herzegovina	Bosnia and Herzegovina	2–1	3–1	2015 FIFA World Cup qualification
29	10 April 2014	Bilino Polje, Zenica, Bosnia and Herzegovina	Bosnia and Herzegovina	3–1	3–1	2015 FIFA World Cup qualification
30	19 June 2014	Solitude, Belfast, Northern Ireland	Northern Ireland	2–0	2–0	2015 FIFA World Cup qualification
31	13 September 2014	Fir Park, Motherwell, Scotland	Faroe Islands	3–0	9–0	2015 FIFA World Cup qualification
32	13 September 2014	Fir Park, Motherwell, Scotland	Faroe Islands	4–0	9–0	2015 FIFA World Cup qualification
33	13 September 2014	Fir Park, Motherwell, Scotland	Faroe Islands	5–0	9–0	2015 FIFA World Cup qualification
34	8 February 2015	Solitude, Belfast, Northern Ireland	Northern Ireland	1–0	4–0	Friendly
35	8 February 2015	Solitude, Belfast, Northern Ireland	Northern Ireland	4–0	4–0	Friendly
36	9 April 2015	Falkirk Stadium, Falkirk, Scotland	Australia	1–1	1–1	Friendly
37	23 October 2015	Fir Park, Motherwell, Scotland	Belarus	1–0	7–0	UEFA Euro 2017 qualifying
38	23 October 2015	Fir Park, Motherwell, Scotland	Belarus	4–0	7–0	UEFA Euro 2017 qualifying
39	29 November 2015	St Mirren Park, Paisley, Scotland	North Macedonia	1–0	10–0	UEFA Euro 2017 qualifying
40	29 November 2015	St Mirren Park, Paisley, Scotland	North Macedonia	8–0	10–0	UEFA Euro 2017 qualifying
41	29 November 2015	St Mirren Park, Paisley, Scotland	North Macedonia	9–0	10–0	UEFA Euro 2017 qualifying
42	29 November 2015	St Mirren Park, Paisley, Scotland	North Macedonia	10–0	10–0	UEFA Euro 2017 qualifying
43	8 April 2016	St Mirren Park, Paisley, Scotland	Slovenia	1–0	3–1	UEFA Euro 2017 qualifying
44	8 April 2016	St Mirren Park, Paisley, Scotland	Slovenia	2–1	3–1	UEFA Euro 2017 qualifying
45	20 September 2016	Laugardalsvöllur, Reykjavík, Iceland	Iceland	1–0	2–1	UEFA Euro 2017 qualifying
46	20 September 2016	Laugardalsvöllur, Reykjavík, Iceland	Iceland	2–1	2–1	UEFA Euro 2017 qualifying
47	20 January 2017	GSZ Stadium, Larnaca, Cyprus	Denmark	1–1	2–2	Friendly
48	1 March 2017	Ammochostos Stadium, Larnaca, Cyprus	New Zealand	1–0	3–2	2017 Cyprus Cup
49	6 March 2017	GSZ Stadium, Larnaca, Cyprus	Austria	1–0	3–1	2017 Cyprus Cup
50	9 June 2017	Falkirk Stadium, Falkirk, Scotland	Romania	2–0	2–0	Friendly
51	14 September 2017	Telki Training Centre, Telki, Hungary	Hungary	3–0	3–0	Friendly
52	19 October 2017	FC Minsk Stadium, Minsk, Belarus	Belarus	1–1	2–1	2019 FIFA World Cup qualification
53	24 October 2017	St Mirren Park, Paisley, Scotland	Albania	3–0	5–0	2019 FIFA World Cup qualification
54	3 March 2018	La Manga Stadium, Murcia, Spain	New Zealand	1–0	2–0	Friendly
55	6 March 2018	La Manga Stadium, Murcia, Spain	New Zealand	1–0	2–0	Friendly
56	12 June 2018	Kielce City Stadium, Kielce, Poland	Poland	2–2	3–2	2019 FIFA World Cup qualification
57	4 September 2018	Loro Boriçi Stadium, Shkodër, Albania	Albania	2–1	2–1	2019 FIFA World Cup qualification
58	6 March 2019	Estádio Algarve, Algarve, Portugal	Denmark	1–0	1–0	2019 Algarve Cup
59	30 August 2019	Easter Road, Edinburgh, Scotland	Cyprus	4–0	8–0	UEFA Euro 2021 qualifying
60	8 November 2019	Elbasan Arena, Elbasan, Albania	Albania	2–0	5–0	UEFA Euro 2021 qualifying
61	19 February 2021	AEK Arena, Larnaca, Cyprus	Cyprus	8–0	10–0	UEFA Euro 2021 qualifying
62	19 February 2021	AEK Arena, Larnaca, Cyprus	Cyprus	10–0	10–0	UEFA Euro 2021 qualifying

== Honours ==
=== Club ===
Glasgow City

- Scottish Women's Premier League: 2010, 2011, 2012
- Scottish Women's Cup: 2011, 2012
- Scottish Women's Premier League Cup: 2012

Manchester City

- FA Women's Super League: 2016
- FA Women's League Cup: 2016
- FA Women's Cup: 2016–17

Rangers

- Scottish Women’s Premier League: 2021–22
- Scottish Women’s Cup: 2023–24
- Scottish Women’s Premier League Cup: 2022–23, 2023–24, 2024–25

=== Individual ===
- FA WSL Team of the Year: 2016–17

== See also ==
- List of women's footballers with 100 or more caps
- Scottish FA Women's International Roll of Honour
