= Falkirk F.C. Women =

Scottish football club

Falkirk
- Full name: Falkirk Football Club Women
- Nickname: The Bairns
- Founded: 1993
- Ground: Westfield Park, Denny
- Head coach: Craig Tully
- League: Scottish Women's Premier League 2
- 2025–26: Scottish Women's Football Championship, 2nd (promoted via playoffs)
- Website: www.falkirkfc.co.uk
Home colours	Away colours

Falkirk Football Club Women, formerly known as Falkirk Ladies Football Club, is a Scottish women's football club based in the town of Falkirk. They currently play in the Scottish Women's Premier League 2 (SWPL 2), after having been promoted from the Scottish Women's Football Championship (SWFC) in the 2025–26 season. They have been affiliated as the women's section of Falkirk F.C. since 2026.

== History ==
Falkirk Ladies were formed in 1993 as Falkirk Girls, when a group of women looking to play organised football joined forces with a girls-only coaching group from Falkirk FC. The club currently run age-group teams from U–11 through to U–17. The Senior Ladies side are based at Westfield Park in Denny, home of Dunipace Juniors.

In the 2018 season they competed in the SWFL North division.
