= Hutchison Vale W.F.C. =

Hutchison Vale
- Full name: Hutchison Vale Women's Football Club
- Nickname: Hutchie
- Ground: Saughton Sports Complex, Edinburgh
- League: Scottish Women's Premier League 2
- Website: https://www.hutchisonvale.com/teams/womens-1st-team/
Home colours	Away colours

Hutchison Vale F.C. are a women's football team that play in the Scottish Women's Premier League, in SWPL2.

They also have a development squad playing in the second division of the SWFL.

In 2017, Hutchison Vale Ladies merged with Edinburgh University Ladies and were renamed Edinburgh University Hutchison Vale. During the merger the team played their home games at the Peffermill Sports Ground, Edinburgh. However this partnership ended at the end of the 2018 season, and they reverted to the Hutchison Vale name for 2019.

The club informed the league that they would not enter a women's team to the SWPL2 for the 2020 season.

== History ==
Hutchison Vale Ladies won the Scottish Cup in 1993 & 1994.

== Honours ==
- Scottish Women's Cup
  - Winners: 1993, 1994
- Scottish Women's League, Division 1 (top tier)
  - Winners: 1993-94
