= Aberdeen F.C. Women =

- Full name: Aberdeen Football Club Women
- Founded: January 2011; 15 years ago 29 November 2018; 7 years ago, as part of Aberdeen F.C.
- Ground: Balmoral Stadium, Cove Bay, Aberdeen
- Manager: Nathan Flight
- League: SWPL 1
- 2025-26: SWPL 1, 9th of 10 (Play-offs)
- Website: https://www.afc.co.uk/en/teams/womens-team
Home colours	Away colours

Aberdeen Football Club Women, formerly known as Aberdeen Ladies, is a Scottish women's football club that competes in Scottish Women's Premier League 1, the top tier of football in Scotland, after winning their second consecutive promotion in 2021.

== History ==
Aberdeen F.C. Ladies was formed in January 2011, with the merger of Aberdeen City, Aberdeen University, East End Girls F.C. and Aberdeen Ladies & Girls F.C.

On 12 November 2017, after a 4–2 defeat to Stirling University, Aberdeen were relegated from the SWPL 1, the first tier of the Scottish Women's Premier League. When Stefan Laird left the club, Derek Gordon took over as interim head coach. In 2018, the team, who was left with only four players over the age of 20, finished seventh in the league and was once again relegated.

On 29 November 2018, Aberdeen F.C. launched Aberdeen F.C. Women; the club formalised its relationship with Aberdeen Ladies F.C., who will continue to operate teams from U7s to U19 National Performance League, and invited the senior team to Pittodrie Stadium to sign their official registration forms with the club and begin the process of integration with the club. They won the 2019 SWFL Division 1 – North, being immediately promoted back to the Scottish Women's Premier League 2.

== Stadium ==
For their return to the top flight, Aberdeen are playing their home matches in 2021–22 at the Balmoral Stadium in the Cove Bay area of Aberdeen, home of Cove Rangers. They had previously played at Cormack Park, the Aberdeen F.C. training ground near Kingswells.

== Current squad ==
As of 13 August 2026.

Note: Flags indicate national team as defined under FIFA eligibility rules; some limited exceptions apply. Players may hold more than one non-FIFA nationality.

No.	Pos.	Nation	Player
1	GK	ENG	Katie O'Hanlon (on loan from West Ham United)
2	FW	USA	Briana Salvetti
4	MF	JAM	Lola Nesbeth
5	DF	SCO	Aimee Black
6	MF	SCO	Erin Carrol
7	FW	SCO	Mia Selbie
8	MF	ENG	Piper Lea (on loan from Aston Villa)
10	MF	ENG	Soraya Walsh
11	FW	SCO	Holly Daniel
12	GK	SCO	Amber Signorini
14	MF	SCO	Mya Christie
15	DF	SCO	Maddie Finnie
17	FW	SCO	Melissa Regmi
20	FW	NIR	Alex Clarke

No.	Pos.	Nation	Player
21	DF	SCO	Millie Buchan
22	FW	SCO	Iona Watt
23	DF	SCO	Carla Fraser
24	DF	SCO	Emily Simpson
25	MF	SCO	Tyler Ferguson
26	MF	SCO	Emily Skinner
27	MF	SCO	Iona Hoyle
28	FW	SCO	Olivia Reid
29	DF	SCO	Zara Ramage
30	GK	SCO	Nikola Faustynowicz
32	DF	SCO	Piper Mayhew
33	MF	SCO	Lexie Colquhoun
35	GK	SCO	Emillie Sim
43	DF	TUR	Selin Cemal (on loan from West Ham United)

== Honours ==
- SWPL 2: 2020-21
- Scottish Women's First Division: 2003–04, 2011
- SWFL Division 1 – North: 2019
- Scottish Women's Football League Cup: 2011
