= Forfar Farmington F.C. =

Forfar Farmington
- Full name: Forfar Farmington Football Club
- Founded: 1984 by Colin Brown
- Ground: Station Park, Forfar, Scotland
- Chairperson: Nicola McBride
- League: SWPL 1
- 2020–21: SWPL 1, 7th of 8 (withdrew)
- Website: https://www.forfarfarmington.com/
Home colours	Away colours

Forfar Farmington Football Club are a football club who are based at Station Park in Forfar, Angus. They were members of the top division Scottish Women's Premier League (SWPL) from 2005 until withdrawing from the competition in 2021.

== Women's teams ==
=== Forfar Farmington (SWPL) ===
The club's senior side (listed as Forfar Farmington), played in the Scottish Women's Premier League having been promoted from the Scottish Women's First Division in the summer of 2005. With the exception of Glasgow City, Forfar Farmington have secured the most successful league finishes in recent years for a Women's team operating fully independent of a provincial men's football club.

Due to problems with player recruitment, Farmington struggled to build a competitive squad for the 2021–22 season. After losing their first match of the season 10–0 against Dundee United in the League Cup, the club chose to withdraw from the SWPL before the start of the new season and concentrate on youth and community schemes.

=== Forfar Farmington Reserves ===
Established in January 2010 using the name 'Forfar Farmington Ladies', the club's second tier side played in the Scottish Women's Second Division (North) before moving to Scottish Women's Football League Second Division East for season 2011 where they would secure the league title. The side contained a high number of experienced players who assisted in helping the team reach the Semi Finals of the Scottish Women's Football League Cup in their first season of participation. The side was re-branded 'Forfar Farmington Reserves' for season 2012, where it will participate in the Scottish Women's First Division

=== Forfar Farmington Ladies ===
Farmington Ladies play in the Scottish Women's Second Division (North) for 2012, having used the name Farmington Blues in the previous two seasons.

Farmington won the SWPL 2 in 2017 to return to the first tier of Scottish women's football for the 2018 season.

///

Forfar Farmington ladies has since been reformed and play in League 2 football, with some of its old Premier side players returning to the club to help the ladies side progress; most notably Erin Cattanach and Cheryl Kilcoyne, both of whom have played in the highest level of women’s football in Scotland.

Forfar Farmington became 2022/23 “Scottish Women’s football league cup champions” with a new squad, filled with familiar and up and coming talent. This win saw them secure a League 1 Play-off spot, in the hopes of being promoted next season.
