= 2016 Scottish Women's Premier League Cup =

Tournament details
- Country: Scotland
- Teams: 16

Final positions
- Champions: Hibernian
- Runners-up: Glasgow City

Tournament statistics
- Matches played: 15
- Goals scored: 74 (4.93 per match)
- All statistics correct as of 16 October 2022.

The 2016 Scottish Women's Premier League Cup was the 15th edition of the SWPL Cup competition, which began in 2002. The competition was to be contested by all 16 teams of the two divisions of the Scottish Women's Premier League (SWPL 1 and SWPL 2).

== First round ==
28 February 2016	Glasgow Women	3–1	Hutchison Vale	Glasgow
11:45	McManus; Evans		Hanson 54'	Stadium: Greenfield Football Centre

28 February 2016	Spartans	5–1 (a.e.t.)	Stirling University	Edinburgh
13:00	McLaughlin; Marshall; Gavin		Gallon	Stadium: Spartans Community Football Academy

28 February 2016	Aberdeen	5–0	Jeanfield Swifts	Aberdeen
13:00	Smith 37'; McGregor 85'; Campbell			Stadium: Heathryfold Park

28 February 2016	Celtic	0–1	Hibernian	East Kilbride
15:00			Arnot 19'	Stadium: K Park Training Academy

28 February 2016	Glasgow City	14–0	Inverness City	Airdrie
14:00	Littlejohn 17'; Love 18'; Shine; Cuthbert; Lauder; Hay; Crilly; Brown; Boyce			Stadium: Excelsior Stadium

28 February 2016	Rangers	5–1	Hamilton Academical	Glasgow
16:00	K. McLaughlin 1'; C. Adams 18'; L. Swanson 70'; C. Brown 73'; K. Turner 83'		McGuiness	Stadium: New Tinto Park

6 March 2016	Heart of Midlothian	0–3	Forfar Farmington	Dalkeith
14:00			Gollan; McCarthy; Sousa	Stadium: King’s Park

6 March 2016	Buchan	7–1	Queen's Park	Maud
14:00	Goal		Goal	Stadium: Maud Leisure Park

== Quarter-finals ==
27 March 2016	Aberdeen	5–1	Spartans	Aberdeen
13:00	Small		Goal	Stadium: Heathryfold Park

27 March 2016	Forfar Farmington	0–6	Hibernian	Forfar
13:00			Goal	Stadium: Station Park

27 March 2016	Glasgow City	10–0	Glasgow Women	Airdrie
14.30	Ross			Stadium: Excelsior Stadium

27 March 2016	Rangers	5–0	Buchan	Glasgow
15:00	Sinclair; Gemmell; Brown; Adams } Foley			Stadium: New Tinto Park

== Semi-finals ==
The draw for the semi-finals took place on 6 April 2016, at Hampden Park.

8 May 2016	Rangers	1–4	Hibernian	Edinburgh
12:00	Brown 75'		>Harrison 15' 50'; Arnot 66'; Ewens 87'	Stadium: Ainslie Par

8 May 2016	Aberdeen	0–1	Glasgow City	Edinburgh
15:00			Shine 45+2'	Stadium: Ainslie Par

== Final ==
The final was played on Sunday, 15 June 2016 at Ainslie Park, Edinburgh. Hibernian won the final 2–1 against Glasgow City. It was their fourth SWPL Cup win.

15 June 2016
19:30

Hibernian	2–1	Glasgow City
Graham 36'; Arnot 90+2'	Report	Fleeting 30'

Ainslie Park, Edinburgh
Referee: Lorraine Clark

Hibernian	Glasgow City

1	(Scotland) Jenna Fife
11	(Scotland) Kirsty Smith
24	(Scotland) Emma Brownlie
17	(Scotland) Joelle Murray (c)
12	(Scotland) Rachel McLauchlan
6	(Scotland) Lisa Robertson
13	(Scotland) Lucy Graham
19	(Scotland) Chelsea Cornet
10	(Scotland) Sarah Ewens
21	(Scotland) Abi Harrison
7	(Scotland) Lizzie Arnot
Substitutes:
2	(Scotland) Clare Williamson
3	(Scotland) Zoe Johnstone
4	(Scotland) Siobhan Hunter
5	(Scotland) Lia Tweedie
8	(Scotland) Kirsten Reilly
9	(Scotland) Caroline Heron
23	(Scotland) Heather Richards
Manager:
(Scotland) Chris Roberts

1	(Scotland) Gemma Fay
11	(Scotland) Nicola Docherty
14	(Scotland) Cheryl McCulloch
3	(Republic of Ireland) Savannah McCarthy
16	(Scotland) Leanne Ross (c)
2	(Scotland) Lauren McMurchie
6	(Scotland) Jo Love
22	(Scotland) Erin Cuthbert
17	(Scotland) Fiona Brown
4	(Scotland) Hayley Lauder
23	(Scotland) Julie Fleeting
Substitutes:
25	(Scotland) Erin Clachers
5	(Republic of Ireland) Ruesha Littlejohn
18	(Scotland) Sam Kerr
19	(Scotland) Sarah Crilly
20	(Scotland) Brogan Hay
Manager:
(Scotland) Scott Booth
