= 2015 Scottish Women's Cup =

Tournament details
- Country: Scotland
- Teams: 69

Final positions
- Champions: Glasgow City
- Runners-up: Hibernian

The 2015 SWF Scottish Cup was the 44th official edition (46th overall) of the main national cup competition in Scottish women's football. All teams in the Scottish Women's Football League and Premier League were eligible to enter.

== Format ==
Teams are either drawn into the preliminary round or receive a bye, so that there are 20 matches to play in the first round. The 20 winners then are joined by the 12 Premier League teams in the second round.

== Preliminary round ==
34 of 57 teams drawn into the preliminary round. 23 received a bye to the first round.

Spartans Reserves	3–4	Glasgow Girls
Glasgow City (SWFL)	6–0	Dunfermline Development
Mill United	5–0	Glasgow Girls
East Fife	3–0	Luthermuir
Dunfermline Athletic	1–4	Motherwell
Seton Ladies	2–5	Harmony Row
Elgin City	1–2	Central Girls
Jeanfield Swifts	5–1	Glasgow Girls Development
Buchan Youth	0–2	Kilwinning
Edinburgh South	2–0	Third Lanark
Cumbernauld Colts	1–0	Falkirk Ladies
Kemnay	1–6	Blackburn United
Buchan Ladies	6–0	Bishopton
Hutchison Vale Development	0–6	Dee Vale
Queen's Park	18–1	Forfar Farmington Ladies
Kilmarnock	11–0	East Fife Violet
Queen of the South	2–1	Claremont

== First round ==
Queen's Park	13–1	Kilwinning
Stenhousemuir	0–5	Dee Vale
Rangers (SWFL)	7–0	Tayside Ladies
Edinburgh Caledonia	3–0	Turriff United
Kilmarnock	2–0	Heart of Midlothian Development
Buchan Ladies	1–3	Glasgow Girls
East Fife	12–0	Edinburgh South
Stranraer	0–12	Partick Thistle
Blackburn United	3–0	Falkirk FC
Stonehaven	1–0	Harmony Row
Central Girls	3–4	Dundee City
Cumbernauld Colts	15–1	Riverside
Dundee United	3–0	Boroughmuir Thistle
Glasgow City (WPFL)	6–2	Westerlands
Motherwell	9–1	Aberdeen Reserves
Aberdeen Development	2–2	Jeanfield Swifts (Aberdeen Development won 5-4 on penalties)
Forfar Farmington Development	3–0	Queen of the South
Caithness Ladies	3–0	United Glasgow
Mill United	5–1	Dee Ladies
Celtic Academy	2–3	Hibernian Development

== Second round ==
The 12 Premier League teams enter the Cup in this round.

Rangers	14–0	Forfar Farmington Development
Hibernian Development	0–2	Aberdeen
Spartans	0–2	Glasgow City
Edinburgh Caledonia	4–1	Caithless Ladies
Rangers (SWFL)	3–0	Inverness City
Aberdeen Development	3–0	Partick Thistle
Celtic	29–0	Dundee City
Cumbernauld Colts	1–0	Boroughmuir Thistle
Forfar Farmington	3–2	Heart of Midlothian
East Fife	3–1	Blackburn United
Kilmarnock	1–1	Mill United (Kilmarnock won 4-3 on penalties)
Stonehaven	1–3	Glasgow Girls
Hibernian	7–0	Glasgow City (SWFL)
Hutchison Vale	0–4	Motherwell
Hamilton Academical	3–4	Stirling University
Dee Vale	6–3 a.e.t.	Queen's Park

== Third round ==
Seven Premier League teams remain. Played 9 August 2015.

Forfar Farmington	0–5	Hibernian
Glasgow Girls	3–4	Motherwell
Edinburgh Caledonia	0–4	Cumbernauld Colts
Dee Vale	1–2	Kilmarnock
Aberdeen Development	1–7	Rangers
Aberdeen	1–4	Glasgow City
Stirling University	0–2	Celtic
East Fife	0–2	Rangers U-20s

== Quarter-finals ==
Four Premier League teams remain, Cumbernauld play in the SWFL 1st Division (level 2), Motherwell, Kilmarnock and Rangers U-20s play in the SWFL 2nd division (3rd level in general). Played on 11 and 13 September.

Cumbernauld Colts	0–7	Hibernian
Rangers U-20s	0–5	Rangers
Celtic	7–0	Motherwell
Glasgow City	11–0	Kilmarnock

== Semi-finals ==
Only Premier League teams remain.

11 October 2015	Rangers	0–2	Glasgow City	Edinburgh
			Shine 66'; L. Hughes 79' (o.g)	Stadium: Ainslie Park

11 October 2015	Hibernian	2–0	Celtic	Edinburgh
	Arthur 19'; Harrison 75'			Stadium: Ainslie Park

== Final ==
It is the fourth Scottish Cup final between Glasgow City and Hibernian in the last eight years: Hibs won in 2007; City in 2011 and 2013. Played on 8 November 2015.

8 November 2015

Glasgow City	3–0	Hibernian
Shine

Ainslie Park, Edinburgh
Referee: Morag Pirie

Glasgow City	Hibernian

1	(Scotland) Lee Alexander
2	(Scotland) Lauren McMurchie
11	(Scotland) Nicola Docherty
21	(Scotland) Rachel Corsie
16	(Scotland) Leanne Ross (c)
7	(Republic of Ireland) Denise O'Sullivan
6	(Scotland) Jo Love
18	(Scotland) Abbi Grant
22	(Scotland) Erin Cuthbert
4	(Scotland) Hayley Lauder
10	(Scotland) Clare Shine
Substitutes:
25	(Scotland) Megan Cunningham
3	(Scotland) Georgie Rafferty
8	(Northern Ireland) Kerry Montgomery
14	(Scotland) Cheryl McCulloch
19	(Scotland) Sarah Crilly
20	(Scotland) Susan Fairlie
23	(Scotland) Julie Fleeting
Manager:
(Scotland) Scott Booth

13	(Scotland) Jenna Fife
11	(Scotland) Kirsty Smith
17	(Scotland) Joelle Murray (c)
4	(Scotland) Siobhan Hunter
24	(Scotland) Emma Brownlie
6	(Scotland) Lisa Robertson
77	(Scotland) Chloe Arthur
23	(Scotland) Heather Richards
5	(Scotland) Lia Tweedie
7	(Scotland) Lizzie Arnot
21	(Scotland) Abi Harrison
Substitutes:
2	(Scotland) Clare Williamson
3	(Scotland) Zoe Johnstone
9	(Scotland) Caroline Heron
19	(Scotland) Chelsea Cornet
Manager:
(Scotland) Chris Roberts
