= 2016 Scottish Women's Cup =

Tournament details
- Country: Scotland
- Teams: 71

Final positions
- Champions: Hibernian
- Runners-up: Glasgow City

The 2016 SWF Scottish Cup, known as the 2016 SSE Scottish Women's Cup for sponsorship reasons, was the 45th official edition (47th overall) of the main national cup competition in Scottish women's football. All teams in the Scottish Women's Football League and SWPL 1 & 2 were eligible to enter.

Hibernian won the final after penalties against Glasgow City, who had won the cup for the previous five years.

== Format ==
Teams are either drawn into the first round or receive a bye, so there are 16 matches to play in the second round. The winners of the first round are then joined by the 16 SWPL 1 & 2 teams in the second round.

== First round ==
30 of 32 teams were drawn into this round. Edinburgh Caledonia & Dumbarton United received a bye to the second round.

Elgin City	2–3	Raith Rovers
Ross County	2–1	Stranraer
Dundee City	1–2	Granite City
Kemnay	0–2	St Roch's
Boroughmuir Thistle	2–3	Kilmarnock
East Kilbride Girls	5–2	Edinburgh South
Teesside	1–3	Dee Ladies
United Glasgow	1–2	Stenhousemuir
Caithness	2–16	Dunfermline Athletic
Blackburn United	0–5	Dundee United
Renfrew	4–3	Cumbernauld Colts
Stonehaven	1–9	East Fife
Westerland	8–1	Bayside
Motherwell	12–0	Central Girls
Bishopton FCL	0–1	Dee Vale

== Second round ==
SWPL teams enter.

Dee Vale	1–5	Granite City
Dunfermline Athletic	7–0	Dumbarton United
Glasgow City	26–0	East Kilbride Girls
Spartans	0–0	Hamilton Academical (Hamilton won 4–3 on penalties)
Buchan	3–5	Forfar Farmington
Dee Ladies	3–4	Raith Rovers
Heart of Midlothian	3–0	St Roch's
Hibernian	11–0	Boroughmuir Thistle
Jeanfield Swifts	18–0	Ross County
Rangers	7–0	East Fife
Stirling University	10–0	Westerlands
Renfrew	5–0	Queen's Park
Motherwell	1–4	Glasgow Girls
Hutchison Vale	5–0	Edinburgh Caledonia
Celtic	7–0	Aberdeen
Dundee United	8–0	Stenhousemuir

== Third round ==
Granite City	3–8	Hutchison Thistle
Hibernian	19–0	Renfrew
Celtic	3–1	Forfar Farmington
Dunfermline Athletic	0–4	Glasgow Girls
Heart of Midlothian	3–0	Hamilton Academical
Rangers	1–3	Glasgow City
Dundee United	1–6	Stirling University
Jeanfield Swifts	6–1	Raith Rovers

== Quarter-finals ==
4 September 2016	Hibernian	3–1	Celtic	Broxburn
14:00				Stadium: Albyn Park

4 September 2016	Stirling University	0–4	Glasgow City	University of Stirling
14:00				Stadium: Stirling

4 September 2016	Jeanfield Swifts	3–5	Glasgow Girls	Perth
15:00				Stadium: McDiarmid Park

18 September 2016	Heart of Midlothian	4–3 (a.e.t.)	Hutchison Vale	Dalkeith
14:00				Stadium: Kings Park

== Semi-finals ==
16 October 2016	Glasgow Girls	0–9	Glasgow City	Edinburgh
			Crilly; Shine; Boyce	Stadium: Ainslie Park

16 October 2016	Hibernian	5–0	Heart of Midlothian	Edinburgh
	McLauchlan; Arnot; Ewens			Stadium: Ainslie Park

== Final ==
The final was played between Glasgow City and Hibernian on 6 November 2016 at New Douglas Park in Hamilton. It featured the same teams as the previous year's final and the SWPL Cup final earlier in the year (as well as the previous two editions of that competition). Hibs won their sixth Scottish Cup, their first since 2010 (Glasgow City having won all of the intervening five).

Hibs men's team had also won the 2015–16 Scottish Cup, and this was the first instance of a club holding both national trophies at the same time (albeit the women's team was only an affiliate and not a fully integrated element of the club at that point, and due to the differing schedules this was only for six months rather than a whole year).

6 November 2016

Glasgow City	1–1 (a.e.t.)	Hibernian
Lauder		Robertson 23'
Penalties
Brown (penalty scored); Cuthbert (penalty scored); McMurchie (penalty scored); Lauder (penalty missed); Shine (penalty scored); Love (penalty scored); Kerr (penalty missed)	5–6	(penalty missed) Robertson; (penalty scored) Hunter; (penalty scored) Arnot; (penalty scored) Brownlie; (penalty scored) Graham; (penalty scored) Ewens; (penalty scored) Murray

New Douglas Park, Hamilton
Referee: Lorraine Clark

Glasgow City	Hibernian

1	(Scotland) Gemma Fay
11	(Scotland) Nicola Docherty
2	(Scotland) Lauren McMurchie
3	(Republic of Ireland) Savannah McCarthy
16	(Scotland) Leanne Ross (c)
6	(Scotland) Jo Love
8	(United States) Haley Rosen
22	(Scotland) Erin Cuthbert
17	(Scotland) Fiona Brown
4	(Scotland) Hayley Lauder
10	(Scotland) Clare Shine
Substitutes:
25	(Scotland) Erin Clachers
14	(Scotland) Cheryl McCulloch
13	(Scotland) Carla Boyce
15	(Republic of Ireland) Keeva Keenan
18	(Scotland) Sam Kerr
19	(Scotland) Sarah Crilly
20	(Scotland) Brogan Hay
Manager:
(Scotland) Scott Booth

1	(Scotland) Jenna Fife
11	(Scotland) Kirsty Smith
2	(Scotland) Clare Williamson
17	(Scotland) Joelle Murray (c)
4	(Scotland) Siobhan Hunter
24	(Scotland) Emma Brownlie
13	(Scotland) Lucy Graham
6	(Scotland) Lisa Robertson
12	(Scotland) Rachel McLauchlan
7	(Scotland) Lizzie Arnot
21	(Scotland) Abi Harrison
Substitutes:
8	(Scotland) Cailin Michie
10	(Scotland) Sarah Ewens
14	(Scotland) Shannon Leishman
16	(Scotland) Ellis Notley
9	(Scotland) Caitlin Russell
23	(Scotland) Rachael Small
31	(Scotland) Kirsty Jeffries
Manager:
(Scotland) Chris Roberts
