= 2017 Scottish Women's Cup =

Tournament details
- Country: Scotland

Final positions
- Champions: Hibernian
- Runners-up: Glasgow City

The 2017 SWF Scottish Cup, known as the 2017 SSE Scottish Women's Cup for sponsorship reasons, was the 46th official edition (48th overall) of the main national cup competition in Scottish women's football. All teams in the Scottish Women's Football League and SWPL 1 & 2 were eligible to enter.

== Quarter-finals ==
Teams in bold advanced to the semi-finals.

Home team	Score	Away team
10 September 2017
Hamilton Academical (1)	0–3	**Rangers** (1)
Jeanfield Swifts (1)	0–6	**Glasgow City** (1)
**Hibernian** (1)	9–0	Glasgow Girls (2)
Cumbernauld Colts (3)	1–2	**Forfar Farmington** (2)

== Semi-finals ==
Teams in bold advanced to the final.

8 October 2017	**Glasgow City**	**5–0**	Forfar Farmington	Stirling
12:00	Murray 4'; Keenan 34'; Grant; Paton 84' (pen.); Foley 88'			Stadium: Forthbank Stadium

8 October 2017	Rangers	**0–4**	**Hibernian**	Stirling
15:30			Turner 25'; McLauchlan 29'; Robertson 31'; Harrison 67'	Stadium: Forthbank Stadium

== Final ==
The final was played on Sunday, 26 November 2017 at the Tony Macaroni Arena, Livingston, West Lothian.

Hibernian won the final 3–0 against Glasgow City. It was their second Scottish Cup win in a row, defeating the same opposition. During the match, Hibs player Siobhan Hunter struck a 40-yard free kick into the top right corner of the Glasgow City goal for the second of the match; it won the Women's Soccer United goal of the month trophy.

26 November 2017
16:10

Hibernian	3–0	Glasgow City
Harrison 45'; Hunter 82'; Small 88'	Report

Almondvale Stadium, Livingston
Attendance: 1,348
Referee: Fiona Morton

**Hibernian**	**Glasgow City**

**1**	(Scotland) Jenna Fife
**24**	(Scotland) Emma Brownlie
**4**	(Scotland) Siobhan Hunter
**17**	(Scotland) Joelle Murray (c)
**11**	(Scotland) Kirsty Smith
**6**	(Scotland) Lisa Robertson
**19**	(Scotland) Chelsea Cornet
**23**	(Scotland) Rachael Small
**21**	(Scotland) Abi Harrison
**12**	(Scotland) Rachel McLauchlan
**18**	(Scotland) Katey Turner
Substitutes:
**25**	(Scotland) Hannah Reid
**8**	(Scotland) Cailin Michie
**14**	(Scotland) Shannon Leishman
**15**	(Scotland) Amy Gallacher
**16**	(Scotland) Ellis Notley
**22**	(Scotland) Caitlin Russell
**27**	(Scotland) Lia Tweedie
Manager:
(Scotland) Kevin Milne

**29**	(Scotland) Lee Alexander
**11**	(Scotland) Nicola Docherty
**3**	(Republic of Ireland) Savannah McCarthy
**16**	(Scotland) Leanne Ross (c)
**15**	(Republic of Ireland) Keeva Keenan
**2**	(Scotland) Lauren McMurchie
**4**	(Scotland) Hayley Lauder
**6**	(Scotland) Jo Love
**7**	(Scotland) Abbi Grant
**23**	(Scotland) Megan Foley
**10**	(Republic of Ireland) Noelle Murray
Substitutes:
**25**	(Scotland) Erin Clachers
**12**	(Scotland) Carla Boyce
**17**	(Scotland) Eilish McSorley
**18**	(Scotland) Sam Kerr
**19**	(Scotland) Joanne Paton
Manager:
(Scotland) Scott Booth
