= Rachel McLauchlan =

Scottish footballer (born 1997)

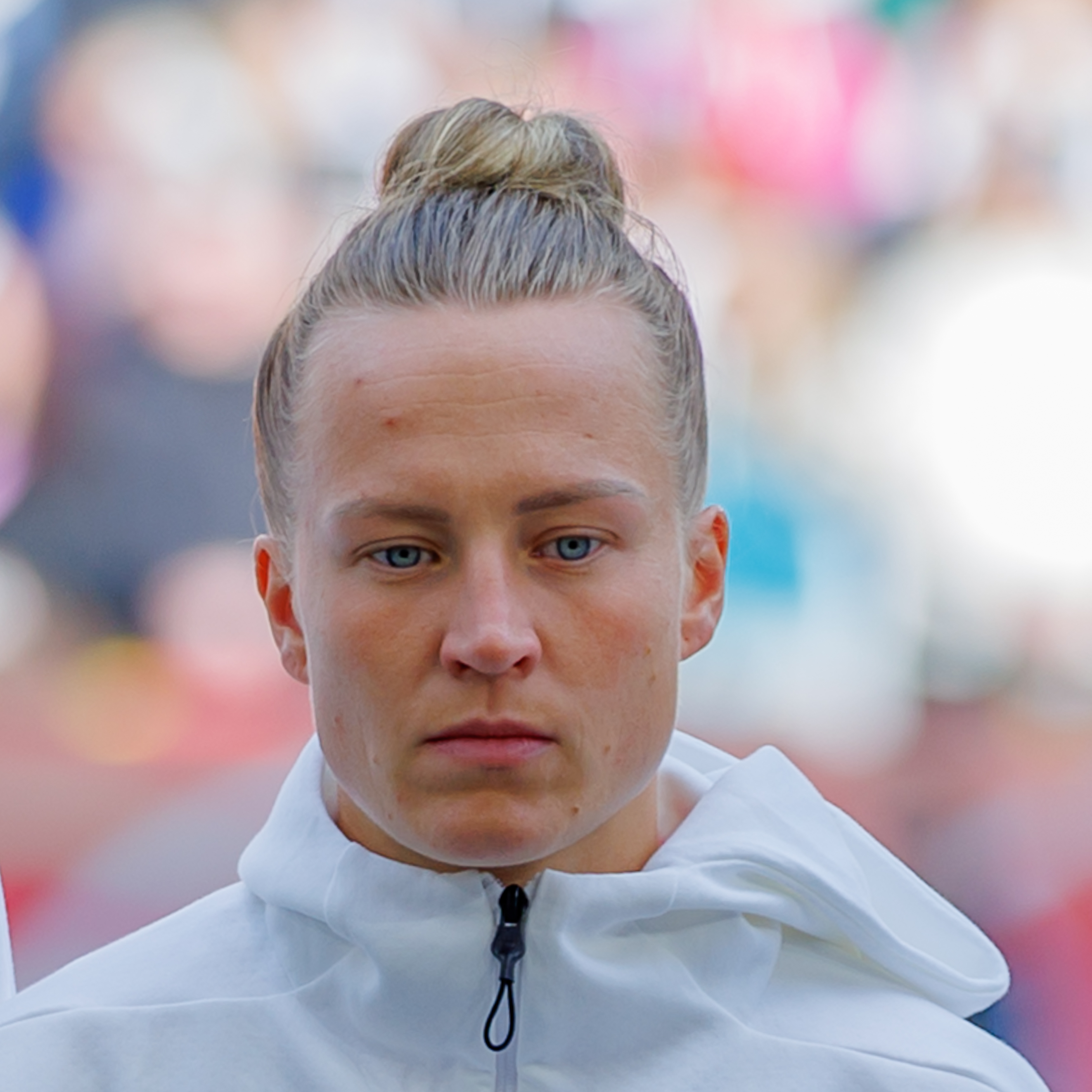
- McLauchlan lining up for Scotland, 2025

Personal information
- Full name: Rachel May McLauchlan
- Date of birth: 7 July 1997 (age 29)
- Place of birth: Livingston, Scotland
- Height: 5 ft 7 in (1.69 m)
- Position: Right-back

Team information
- Current team: Newcastle United
- Number: 27

Youth career
- Deveronvale Girls
- Letham FC Girls

Senior career*
Years	Team	Apps	(Gls)
2013–2014	Inverness City		
2014–2016	Aberdeen		(1)
2016–2019	Hibernian	72	(19)
2019	Yeovil Town	7	(0)
2019–2020	Glasgow City	22	(2)
2021–2024	Rangers	87	(9)
2024–2026	Brighton & Hove Albion	37	(1)
2026–	Newcastle United	0	(0)

International career^{‡}
2013–2014	Scotland U17	6	(0)
2014–2016	Scotland U19	13	(1)
2016–	Scotland	39	(0)
- * Club domestic league appearances and goals as of 6 May 2026 ‡ National team caps and goals as of 15 October 2026

Rachel May McLauchlan (Scots: [məˈklɔːxlɪn]; born 7 July 1997) is a Scottish footballer, who plays as a right-back for Women's Super League 2 club Newcastle United and the Scotland women's national football team.

== Club career ==
McLauchlan started her senior career at Inverness City, then transferred to Aberdeen in August 2014. In January 2016 she joined Scottish Women's Premier League title challengers Hibernian. She won six trophies (three Scottish Women's Cups and three SWPL Cups) in her three seasons in Edinburgh.

McLauchlan moved to English club Yeovil Town in January 2019. She returned to Scottish football in July 2019, signing for Glasgow City. By the end of that season she had a SWPL championship medal and a fourth Scottish Cup medal in her collection. During the 2020–21 SWPL season, McLauchlan scored a goal during the team's 2–0 season opener against Celtic.

In January 2021, McLauchlan joined Rangers on a pre-contract agreement arranged in summer 2020, with Glasgow City teammates Kirsty Howat and Sam Kerr doing likewise, while Nicola Docherty had made the same move across the city some months earlier. In her first full season with the Gers, 2021–22, McLauchlan was part of the squad that won the SWPL for the first time in club history; in the second season they won their first SWPL Cup, and in the third season they won their first Scottish Cup, also narrowly missing out on the league title in both years. in the 2024 Scottish Women's Cup final, McLauchlan opened the scoring against Hearts with "an unbelievable strike" from 30 yards and was named as the Player of the Match, eight years after receiving the same award as a Hibs player in the 2016 final.

On 11 July 2024, McLauchlan signed for Brighton & Hove Albion.

On 16 July 2026, McLauchlan was announced at Newcastle United.

== International career ==
McLauchlan made her debut for the Scotland national team in a 7–0 friendly thrashing by the Netherlands, in Livingston, in October 2016. She entered play as an 86th-minute substitute for Hibs teammate Kirsty Smith. In June 2017, Scotland coach Anna Signeul named McLauchlan in her squad for Euro 2017.

== Career statistics ==
=== Brighton & Hove Albion ===
As of match played 31 May 2026

Season	League			FA Cup		League Cup		Total	
Season	Division	Apps	Goals	Apps	Goals	Apps	Goals	Apps	Goals
2024–25	Women's Super League	18	1	2	0	4	1	24	2
2025–26	Women's Super League	19	0	4	0	3	0	26	0
Total		37	1	6	0	7	1	50	2

=== International appearances ===
Scotland statistics accurate as of match played 13 October 2026.

Year	Scotland	
Year	Apps	Goals
2016	1	0
2017	4	0
2018	2	0
2019	—	
2020	—	
2021	7	0
2022	2	0
2023	7	0
2024	—	
2025	8	0
2026	8	0
Total	39	0

== Honours ==
=== Club ===
Hibernian

- Scottish Women's Cup: 2016, 2017, 2018
- Scottish Women's Premier League Cup: 2016, 2017, 2018

Glasgow City

- Scottish Women's Premier League: 2019
- Scottish Women's Cup: 2019

Rangers

- Scottish Women's Premier League: 2021–22
- Scottish Women's Cup: 2023–24
- Scottish Women's Premier League Cup: 2022–23
- City of Glasgow Women's Cup: 2022
