= Lizzie Arnot =

Scottish footballer (born 1996)

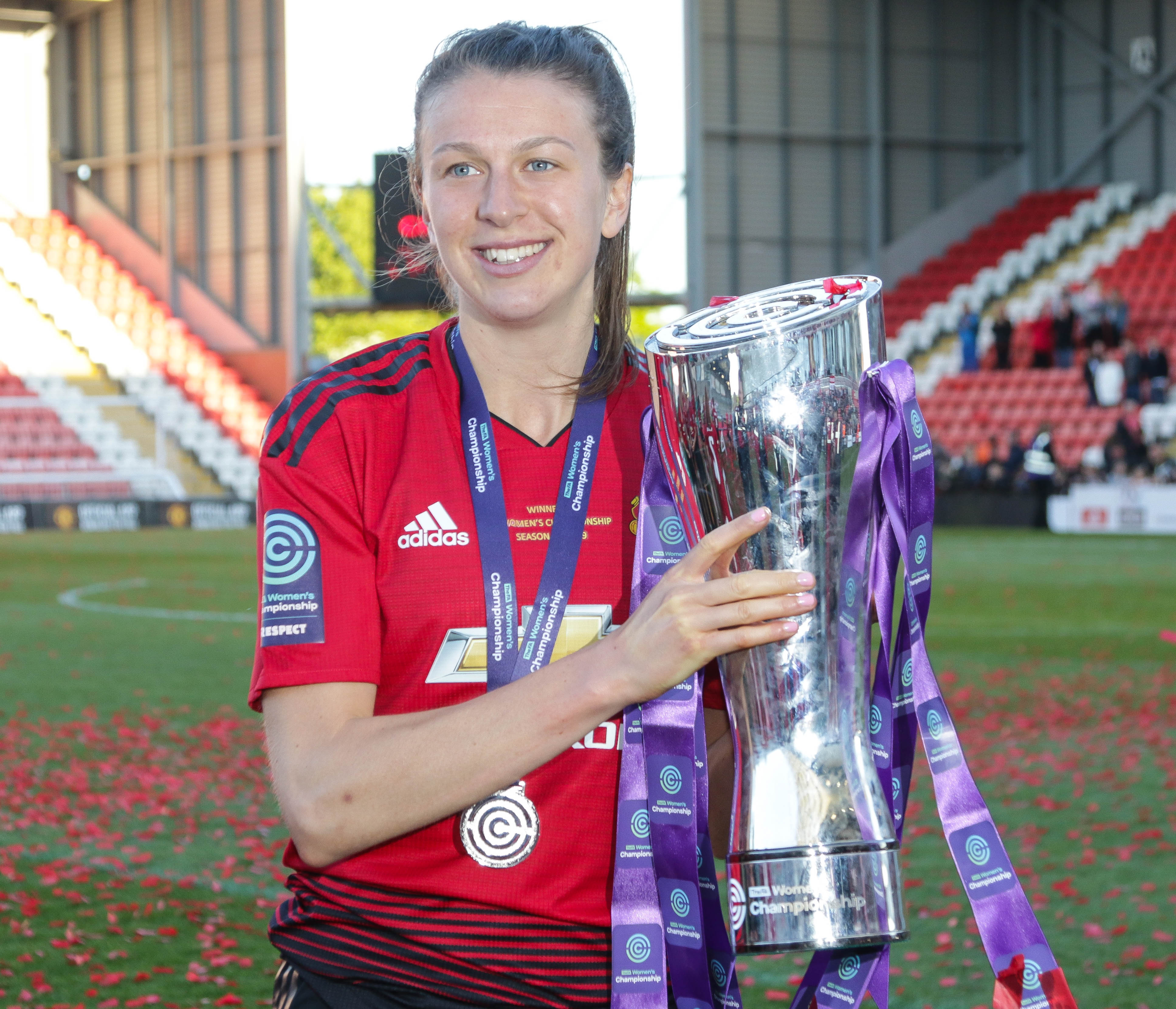
- Arnot with Manchester United

Personal information
- Full name: Elizabeth Jane Arnot
- Date of birth: 1 March 1996 (age 30)
- Place of birth: Edinburgh, Scotland
- Height: 5 ft 7 in (1.69 m)
- Position: Forward

Senior career*
Years	Team	Apps	(Gls)
2011	Hutchison Vale	2	(0)
2012–2018	Hibernian	26+	(17+)
2018–2020	Manchester United	34	(9)
2020–2026	Rangers	46+	(16+)

International career^{‡}
2010	Scotland U15	2	(0)
2011–2012	Scotland U17	8	(2)
2013–2015	Scotland U19	28	(11)
2015–	Scotland	39	(3)
- * Club domestic league appearances and goals as of 28 May 2024 ‡ National team caps and goals as of 10:35, 16 April 2023 (UTC)

Elizabeth Jane Arnot (born 1 March 1996) is a Scottish former professional footballer who played as a forward. She represented the Scotland national team and played club football for Hutchison Vale, Hibernian, Manchester United and Rangers, before retiring in 2026.

== Club career ==
=== Hibernian ===
Arnot started her career at Edinburgh City and later Hutchison Vale before she joined Hibernian in January 2012. Arnot was part of the side that won consecutive Scottish domestic cup doubles in 2016 and 2017, and also finished as league runners-up on four occasions between 2013 and 2017.

In 2017, Arnot suffered a cruciate ligament injury, ruling her out for 14 months; on her return, she scored five goals for Hibernian in a 9–0 win against Celtic in the 2018 SWPL Cup final, retaining the title for the third straight year.

=== Manchester United ===
On 27 June 2018, it was announced that Arnot and teammate Kirsty Smith were leaving Hibernian. Both players joined the newly formed Manchester United for the 2018–19 season. Arnot became the women's team's first ever goalscorer, scoring the only goal in the side's first competitive match, a 1–0 win against Liverpool in the FA Women's League Cup on 19 August. A month later, she scored her first league goal of the campaign in a 3–0 home win against Sheffield United. On 18 November 2018, Arnot scored her first United brace in a 0–5 win away to Crystal Palace.

Arnot scored her first goal of the 2019–20 season in an 11–1 League Cup home win against Leicester City on 21 November 2019. She left following the expiration of her contract at the end of her second season.

=== Rangers ===
On 31 July 2020, Arnot returned to Scotland to sign with Rangers. She scored 16 goals in 21 appearances as she won the 2020–21 golden boot. During the 2021–22 season, Arnot contributed 25 goals and 23 assists in 31 appearances as Rangers won the Scottish Women's Premier League for the first time, confirming the title in a 0–0 draw at home to Glasgow City. Arnot made her 50th appearance for Rangers in a 4–0 victory over Aberdeen at Ibrox Stadium, scoring the fourth goal. On 27 April 2022, Arnot was nominated for the PFA Women's Player of the Year award and was named in the PFA Scotland Team of the Year. On 28 May 2022, she signed a two-year contract extension.

In the inaugural match of the Women's Glasgow Cup, Rangers played Celtic on 24 July 2022 at Excelsior Stadium in Airdrie; Rangers lifted the trophy in a 2–1 victory, and Arnot's corner was turned into goal by Celtic captain Kelly Clark for the second goal. On 8 November 2022, Rangers beat Hibernian 2–0 in the 2022–23 Scottish Women's Premier League Cup final at Tynecastle Park. Arnot scored a spectacular opening goal, was named player of the match and later won "goal of the season".

On 4 February 2024, Arnot made her 100th appearance for Rangers in a 9–0 victory over Dundee United in Scottish Cup round of 16. Rangers retained the SWPL Cup in a 4–1 victory over Partick Thistle in the final at Tynecastle Park in March 2024. Two months later they narrowly missed out on the SWPL title on the last matchday (as they had also done in the previous season) but then won the 2023–24 Scottish Women's Cup with a 2–0 win against Hearts at Hampden Park, Arnot sealing club's first-ever Scottish Cup triumph with the second goal in the 86th minute.

Arnot retired from football at the end of the 2025–26 season, aged 30.

== International career ==
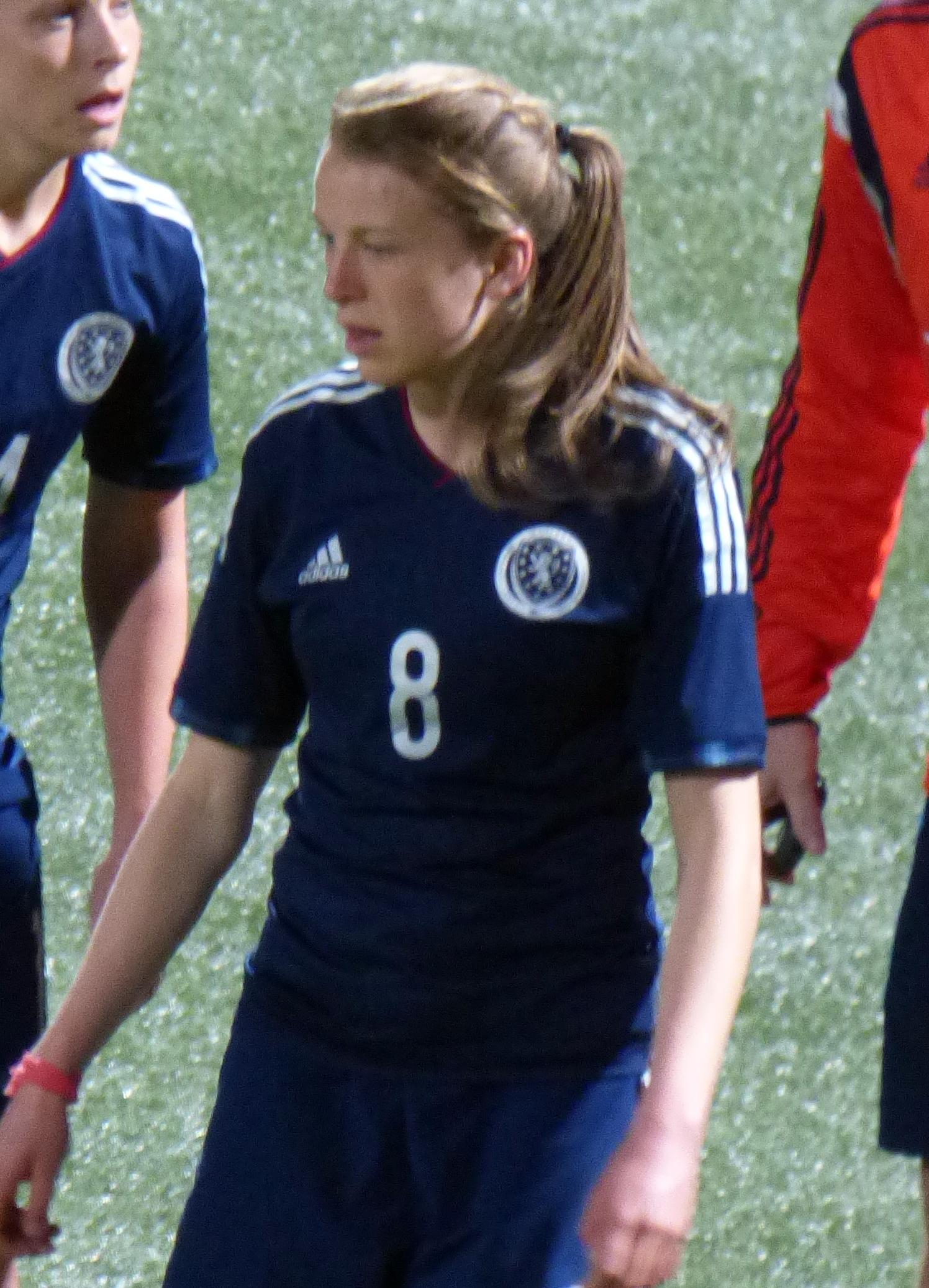
Arnot training with Scotland in 2015.

Arnot represented Scotland at Scotland under-17 and Scotland under-19 level. She made her full international debut for Scotland against Norway on 17 September 2015, when she came on as a substitute for Joanne Love. After a year out due to a cruciate ligament injury, which caused her to miss Euro 2017, Arnot was recalled to the Scotland squad in May 2018 for their World Cup qualifiers against Belarus and Poland. Arnot scored her first international goals during the 2019 Algarve Cup, scoring twice in a 4–1 win against Iceland.

In May 2019, Arnot was named in the Scotland squad for the 2019 FIFA Women's World Cup, the nation's first ever appearance at the tournament.

== Career statistics ==
=== International appearances ===
As of the match played on 11 April 2023

National team	Year	Apps	Goals
Scotland	2015	4	0
Scotland	2016	2	0
Scotland	2017	7	0
Scotland	2018	5	0
Scotland	2019	11	2
Scotland	2020	5	0
Scotland	2021	3	1
Scotland	2022	2	0
Total		39	3

=== International goals ===
As of match played 10 June 2021. Scotland score listed first, score column indicates score after each Arnot goal.

International goals by date, venue, opponent, score, result and competition
No.	Date	Venue	Opponent	Score	Result	Competition	Ref.
1	4 March 2019	Bela Vista Municipal Stadium, Parchal, Portugal	Iceland	1–0	4–1	2019 Algarve Cup	
2	4 March 2019	Bela Vista Municipal Stadium, Parchal, Portugal	Iceland	4–1	4–1	2019 Algarve Cup	
3	19 February 2021	AEK Arena, Larnaca, Cyprus	Cyprus	6–0	10–0	UEFA Women's Euro 2022 qualifying	

== Honours ==
=== Club ===
Hibernian

- Scottish Women's Cup: 2016; runner-up 2015
- Scottish Women's Premier League Cup: 2016, 2018; runner-up 2014, 2015

Manchester United

- FA Women's Championship: 2018–19

Rangers

- Scottish Women's Premier League: 2021–22
- Scottish Women's Cup: 2023–24, 2024–25; runner-up 2022–23
- Scottish Women's Premier League Cup: 2022–23, 2023–24, 2024–25
- City of Glasgow Women's Cup: 2022

=== Individual ===
- Scottish Women's Premier League golden boot: 2020–21
- SWPL Player of the Month: December 2020
- PFA Women's Player of the Year: 2022 (nominated)
- PFA Scotland Team of the Year: 2022
- Scottish Women's Premier League Sky Sports goal of the season: 2022–23
