= Lisa Robertson (footballer) =

Scottish footballer (born 1992)

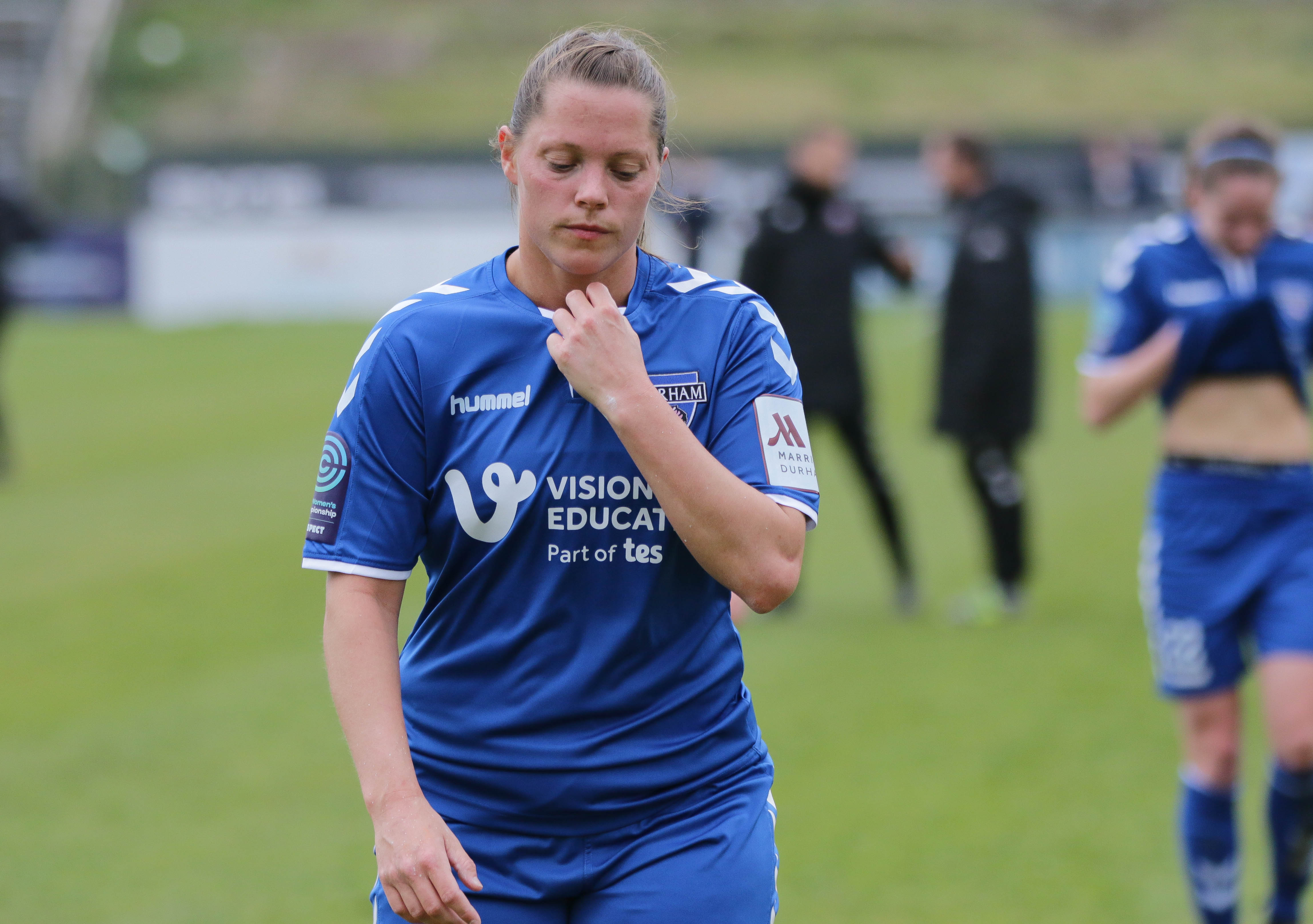
- Robertson in 2019

Personal information
- Date of birth: 16 May 1992 (age 34)
- Place of birth: Edinburgh, Scotland
- Height: 5 ft 1 in (1.55 m)
- Position: Midfielder

Team information
- Current team: Heart of Midlothian
- Number: 6

Youth career
- Caledonia Park Boys
- 2007–2008: Hibernian

Senior career*
Years	Team	Apps	(Gls)
2008–2012	Hibernian	31+	(6+)
2012	Spokane Shine		
2013	Glasgow City	21	(9)
2014–2018	Hibernian		
2018–2020	Durham	22	(6)
2020–2024	Celtic	20	(0)
2021–2022	→ Birmingham City (loan)	16	(0)
2024–	Heart of Midlothian	31	(5)

International career^{‡}
2009	Scotland U17	2	(0)
2009–2011	Scotland U19	16	(0)
2021–	Scotland	8	(0)
- * Club domestic league appearances and goals ‡ National team caps and goals as of 15:15, 26 February 2025 (UTC)

Lisa Robertson (born 16 May 1992) is a Scottish footballer. She currently plays as a midfielder for Heart of Midlothian in the Scottish Women's Premier League.

She has previously played for Hibernian, Spokane Shine, Glasgow City, Durham and Celtic, as well as Birmingham City on loan.

== Club career ==
Lisa Robertson grew up in Dalkeith, Scotland. She played for boys' teams in her youth before joining Hibernian girls as a 14-year-old. Robertson signed for the senior team less than a year later in January 2008.

=== Hibernian ===
Robertson won her first major trophy when she played in the 2010 Scottish Women's Cup final, as an 18-year-old against Rangers. Hibs won the final 2–1.

=== Spokane Shine ===
During the Summer of 2012 Robertson left Scotland for the United States where she played for Spokane Shine Ladies in the Women's Premier Soccer League for the Summer.

=== Glasgow City ===
She returned from the United States and signed for Glasgow City in December 2012. She played for City for one year before re-signing for Hibs for the 2014 season.

=== Hibernian second spell ===
In 2014 Robertson resigned for Hibernian.

=== Durham ===
In November 2018, Robertson signed for Durham Women.

=== Celtic ===
In January 2020, Robertson signed for Celtic.

==== Loan to Birmingham City ====
In August 2021, Robertson moved Birmingham City from Celtic on a season-long loan.

=== Hearts ===
On 29 June 2024, Robertson joined Hearts on a two-year deal from Celtic.

== International career ==
Robertson played for the Scotland U-17 and U-19 teams. She was called into the national squad in February 2021, and made her full international debut in a 10–0 win against Cyprus on 19 February.

== Personal life ==
Robertson runs her own painting and decorating company in Edinburgh.

== Honours ==
As a Hibs player, Robertson won the Scottish Cup and the League Cup four times apiece. She was runner-up with Hibs in the SWPL three times in 2015, 2016 and 2017. She was part of the treble-winning Glasgow City team of 2013.

=== Club ===
Hibernian

- Scottish Women's Cup: 2010, 2016, 2017, 2018
- Scottish Women's Premier League Cup: 2011, 2016, 2017, 2018

Glasgow City

- Scottish Women's Premier League: 2013
- Scottish Women's Cup: 2013
- Scottish Women's Premier League Cup: 2013
