= 2023–24 Women's Scottish Cup =

2023–24 Scottish Women's Cup
Tournament details
- Country: Scotland
- Dates: 10 September 2023 – 26 May 2024

Final positions
- Champions: Rangers
- Runners-up: Heart of Midlothian

The 2023–24 Women's Scottish Cup was the 51st official edition (53rd overall) of the national cup competition in Scottish women's football. For sponsorship reasons, this edition was officially known as the Scottish Gas Women's Scottish Cup.

Rangers, runners-up in 2023, overcame holders Celtic at the semi-final stage, then defeated debutant finalists Heart of Midlothian to claim the trophy for the first time.

== Results ==
All results listed are published by the Scottish Football Association (SFA).

=== Preliminary round ===
The draw for the preliminary round took place on 1 October 2023 at Hampden Bowling Club. This consisted of 29 clubs from the Scottish Women's Football Leagues and 4 clubs from the Highlands and Islands League; Dalbeattie Star received a bye to the first round.

10 September 2023	Armadale Thistle	6–0	Arbroath	Armadale
14:30	Hay; MacGregor; Williamson; Gray			Stadium: Volunteer Park

10 September 2023	Buchan Ladies	2–6	Inverurie Loco Works	Peterhead
16:00	Riddel; McKerell			Stadium: Catto Park

10 September 2023	Buckie Ladies	0–4	Dunfermline Athletic	Portgordon
14:00				Stadium: Gordon Park

10 September 2023	Cumbernauld Colts	4–3	Harmony Row	Cumbernauld
14:00				Stadium: Broadwood Stadium

10 September 2022	Dunipace	8–2	Annan Athletic	Dunipace
15:00				Stadium: Westfield Park

10 September 2023	Dyce	4–0	Huntley	Dyce
14:00				Stadium: Ian Mair Park

10 September 2023	Edinburgh South	21–0	Brora	Edinburgh
13:15				Stadium: Holyrood High School

10 September 2023	Flip the Mindset	7–3	Nairn St Ninian	Glasgow
14:30				Stadium: Nethercraigs

10 September 2023	Glenrothes Strollers	5–2	Ardrossan Winton Rovers	Glenrothes
12:30				Stadium: Overstenton Park

10 September 2023	Grampian Ladies	4–2	Alloa Athletic	Aberdeen
16:00				Stadium: Spain Park

10 September 2023	Kilwinning FA	4–1	Stonehaven Ladies	Kilwinning
14:15				Stadium: SKFA Academy Park

10 September 2023	Linlithgow Rose	8–1	Central Girls	Linlithgow
16:00				Stadium: Xcite Linlithgow Leisure Centre

10 September 2023	Murieston United	4–2	Bishopton	Murieston
14:00				Stadium: Bankton Mains Sports Complex

10 September 2023	Orkney Women	0–6	Drumchapel United	Kirkwall
12:00				Stadium: Kirkwall Grammar School

10 September 2023	Stewarton United	5–4 (a.e.t.)	McDermid Ladies	Kilmarnock
12:45				Stadium: St Joseph’s Academy

10 September 2023	West Park United	0–4	Elgin City	Bishopbriggs
14:00				Stadium: St Joseph’s Academy, Kilmarnock

=== First Round ===
The draw for the First Round took place on 1 October 2023 at Hampden Park. 17 Preliminary Round winners were joined by 11 clubs from SWF League One. Flip the Mindset withdrew from the competition, so Airdrie Ladies received a bye to the Second Round.

1 October 2023	Bonnyrigg Rose	3–0	BSC Glasgow	Bonnyrigg
12:30				Stadium: Poltonhall

1 October 2023	Cumbernauld Colts	0–7	Inverurie Loco Works	Broadwood Stadium
14:00				Stadium: Cumbernauld

1 October 2023	Dalbeattie Star	0–16	Armadale Thistle	Dalbeattie
12:00				Stadium: Dalbeattie Learning Campus

1 October 2023	Drumchapel United	3–2	Dunipace	Glasgow
12:30				Stadium: Donald Dewar Centre

1 October 2023	Dundee West	3–5	Grampian	Dundee
12:30				Stadium: Downfield Park

1 October 2023	Edinburgh Caledonia	3–5	Kilwinning	Edinburgh
12:30				Stadium: Peffermill 3G

1 October 2023	Edinburgh South	0–3	Dyce	Edinburgh
12:00				Stadium: Holyrood High School

1 October 2023	Forfar Farmington	1–3	Queen of the South	Forfar
12:30				Stadium: Station Park

1 October 2023	Giffnock SC	3–2	Dunfermline Athletic	Giffnock
12:30				Stadium: Eastwood Park

1 October 2023	Linlithgow Rose	0–2	Glenrothes Strollers	Linlithgow
12:30				Stadium: Xcite Linlithgow

1 October 2023	Murieston United	1–12	Stenhousemuir	Murieston
12:30				Stadium: Bankton Mains

1 October 2023	St Mirren	4–2	Elgin City	Linwood
12:30				Stadium: Mossedge Village Football Pitch

1 October 2023	Stewarton United	0–9	Falkirk	Stewarton
12:30				Stadium: Rose Reilly Sports Centre

1 October 2023	Airdrie	3–0 (awarded)	Flip the Mindset	Airdrie
12:30				Stadium: Airdrie Leisure Centre

=== Second Round ===
The draw for the Second Round took place on 5 November 2023 at Hampden Park, featuring 14 Round Two winners joined by 10 clubs from the SWF Championship. Grampian withdrew from the competition, so Renfrew Ladies received a bye to the Third Round.

5 November 2023	Airdrie	3–2	Queen of the South	Carluke
13:30				Stadium: John Cumming Stadium

5 November 2023	Armadale Thistle	1–2	Edinburgh Caledonia	Armadale
13:30				Stadium: Volunteer Park

5 November 2023	Bonnyrigg Rose	5–0	Giffnock SC	Bonnyrigg
13:30				Stadium: Poltonhall 3G

5 November 2023	East Fife	3–0	Dryburgh Athletic	Methil, Fife
13:30				Stadium: New Bayview

5 November 2023	Edinburgh City	0–6	Dyce	Edinburgh
16:30				Stadium: Meadowbank Stadium

5 November 2023	Falkirk	0–2	Glenrothes Strollers	Falkirk
14:30				Stadium: Falkirk Stadium

5 November 2023	Inverness Caley Thsitle	8–0	Drumchapel United	Inverness
14:30				Stadium: Milburn Academy

5 November 2023	Inverurie Loco Works	2–4	Ayr United	Inverurie
14:00				Stadium: Harlaw Park

5 November 2023	Rossvale	5–1	St Mirren	Glasgow
15:30				Stadium: Petershill Park

5 November 2023	Stenhousemuir	12–0	Hutchison Vale	Alloa
14:30				Stadium: Ochilview Park

5 November 2023	Westdyke	5–3	Greenock Morton	Westhill
14:30				Stadium: Lawsondale Playing Fields

5 November 2023	Renfrew	w/o	Grampian Ladies	Westhill
14:30				Stadium: Lawsondale Playing Fields

=== Third Round ===
The draw for the Third Round took place on 8 November 2023 at Hampden Park. The 12 Second Round winners were joined by 20 clubs from the Scottish Women's Premier League. Airdrie withdrew from the competition, so Livingston received a bye to the Fourth Round.

7 January 2024	Ayr United	0–7	Celtic	Cumnock
14:00			Ross 6', 81'; Gallacher 15', 48'; Shen Mengyu 58'; Cavanagh 66'; Cummings 90'	Stadium: Townhead Park

7 January 2024	Boroughmuir Thistle	1–3	Aberdeen	Edinburgh
14:00	Arthur 21'		Hutchison 67'; Innes 75'; Stewart 86' (pen.)	Stadium: Meadowbank Stadium

7 January 2024	Dyce	0–5	Dundee United	Edinburgh
14:00			Fraser 3'; Own Goal 15'; Chuter 59', 90'; Smith 85' (pen.)	Stadium: Meadowbank Stadium

7 January 2024	East Fife	0–5	Renfrew	Edinburgh
12:00				Stadium: Meadowbank Stadium

7 January 2024	Glasgow Women	1–6	Spartans	Motherwell
15:00				Stadium: Alliance Park

7 January 2024	Glenrothes Strollers	1–3	Gartcairn	Glenrothes
13:00	Stewart 30'		Mitchell 35'; Wands 61'; Moran 77'	Stadium: Michael Woods Sport And Leisure Centre

7 January 2024	Hearts	9–0	Edinburgh Caledonia	Edinburgh
13:00	McGovern 13' (pen.), 16', 26', 54'; Anderson 34'; Hunter 64'; Adamolekun 70'; Findlay 81'; Handley 84'			Stadium: Oriam

7 January 2024	Hibernian	10–0	St Johnstone	Edinburgh
13:00	McAlonie 12', 29', 39', 70'; Adams 44', 46'; Notley 52', 88'; Morrison 4'; Lawson 49'			Stadium: Meadowbank Stadium

7 January 2024	Inverness Caledonian Thistle	0–12	Rangers	Inverness
13:00			Ross 9', 33'; Maclean 20'; Ewens 27'; Arnot 37'; Hay 45'; Rowe 49', 70'; Austin 65'; Hardy 75', 79', 89' (pen.)	Stadium: Caledonian Stadium

7 January 2024	Kilmarnock	2–3 (a.e.t.)	Hamilton Academical	Kilmarnock
15:00	Brown; Robinson		Graham; Clark; Giard 119'	Stadium: Rugby Park

7 January 2022	Partick Thistle	4–2	Motherwell	Glasgow
12:00	Lawton 29'; Falconer 48', 79'; Donaldson 50'		Cross 26' (pen.); Robinson 33'	Stadium: Petershill Park

7 January 2024	Rossvale	0–10	Glasgow City	Glasgow
12:00			Forrest 2', 16', 31'; Love 33'; Sullivan 29', 53'; Davidson 38' (pen.), 41' (pen.); Gambone 59'; Kozak 73'	Stadium: Petershill Park

7 January 2024	Stenhousemuir	0–7	Montrose	Stenhousemuir
14:30			Carter 11'; Brown 37', 53', 76'; Taylor 42'; Ridgeway 72'; Codegoni 59'	Stadium: Ochilview Park

7 January 2024	Westdyke	1–2	Stirling University	Westhill, Aberdeenshire
15:00				Stadium: Lawsondale Playing Fields

16 January 2024	Queen's Park	2–0	Bonnyrigg Rose	Glasgow
19:50	McGoldrick 9'; Molley 84'			Stadium: Nethercraigs Sports Complex

=== Fourth Round ===
The draw for the Fourth Round, with the 16 Round Three winners playing in 8 ties, took place on 8 January 2024 at Hampden Park.

4 February 2024	East Fife	0–10	Hearts	Methil
12:30			Adamolekun 1', 11', 53'; Brownlie 5'; Grant 45'; Findlay 56'; Handley 59'; Rennie 67', 90'; Moonie 68'	Stadium: New Bayview

4 February 2024	Glasgow City	1–1 (a.e.t.) (4–5 p)	Hibernian	Glasgow
12:00	Davidson 7'		Eddie 34'	Stadium: Petershill Park
	Penalties
	Brown (penalty scored); Fulton (penalty missed); Davidson (penalty scored); Lauder (penalty scored); Moore (penalty scored); Love (penalty missed)		Adams (penalty scored); McAlonie (penalty scored); Baucom (penalty scored); McGregor (penalty missed); Lawson (penalty scored); Murray (penalty scored)

4 February 2024	Hamilton Academical	0–6	Celtic	Hamilton
16:00			Ross 25', 28', 40'; Craig 53'; Graham 68' (o.g.); Hayes 83'	Stadium: New Douglas Park

4 February 2024	Livingston	2–2 (a.e.t.) (4–3 p)	Gartcairn	Livingston
13:00	Elizabeth 43'; Begg 93'		Newbigging 82'; Wands 92'	Stadium: Almondvale Stadium
	Penalties
	Frew (penalty scored); Dodds (penalty scored); Munro (penalty scored); Ross (penalty scored); Murphy (penalty missed)		Moran (penalty missed); Wands (penalty scored); Howie (penalty scored); Hay (penalty scored); Newbigging (penalty missed)

4 February 2024	Montrose	5–0	Stirling University	Methil
12:30	McLaren 24'; Taylor 56', 90'; Harkin 55'; Daniel 89'			Stadium: New Bayview

4 February 2024	Partick Thistle	3–1	Queen's Park	Glasgow
16:00	McQuillan 4'; Carla Boyce 45'; Henderson 88'		Kane 30'	Stadium: Petershill Park

4 February 2024	Rangers	9–0	Dundee United	Cumbernauld
16:00	Rowe 2'; Austin 10'; Hay 19'; Hill 27'; Ross 37', 67' (pen.); McLoughlin 58'; Martinez 73'; McAulay 85'			Stadium: Broadwood Stadium

4 February 2024	Spartans	2–1	Aberdeen	Edinburgh
13:00	McCafferty 64'; Galbraith 83'		Miller 77'	Stadium: Ainslie Park

=== Quarter-finals ===
The draw for the quarter-finals took place on 5 February 2024 at Hampden Park.

10 March 2024	Hibernian	2–6	Rangers	Edinburgh
12:30	Lawson 16'; McGregor 38'		McAulay 11'; Arnot 32'; Ewens 64'; Hardy 87', 90+7'; Ross 90+3'	Stadium: Meadowbank Stadium

10 March 2024	Livingston	2–6	Spartans	Livingston
12:00			Galbraith 15', 32', 59'; Jordan 65'; Frew 66' (o.g.)	Stadium: Almondvale Stadium

10 March 2024	Partick Thistle	0–1	Hearts	Glasgow
13:00			Waldie 86'	Stadium: Petershill Park

10 March 2024	Montrose	0–6	Celtic	Montrose
16:00			Loferski 5', 8'; Smith 42'; Shen Mengyu 56'; Hayes 60'; Agnew 83'	Stadium: Links Park

=== Semi-finals ===
The draw for the semi-finals took place on 29 March 2024 at Hampden Park.

27 April 2024
12:15

Rangers	2–0	Celtic
Cornet 83'; Howat 88'

Hampden Park, Glasgow
28 April 2024
12:15

Spartans	0–3	Hearts
		K. Mooney 44'; McGovern 58'; C. Girasoli 90'

Hampden Park, Glasgow

== Final ==
Heart of Midlothian were appearing in the first major final in their history. Rangers were making their fourth appearance, having lost all of the previous three including in 2023. They had already won the 2024 Scottish Women's Premier League Cup final two months earlier, but had been narrowly beaten to the 2023–24 Scottish Women's Premier League title a week before the Scottish Cup final.

Rangers justified their pre-match status as favourites with a 2–0 victory through goals from Rachel McLauchlan, Lizzie Arnot in either half, with Hearts defending strongly for the most part and goalkeeper Charlotte Parker-Smith doing much to prevent further goals; however the Edinburgh side showed little going forward to trouble the Glasgow team's defence.

=== Details ===
26 May 2024
14:30

Rangers	2–0	Heart of Midlothian
McLauchlan 24'; Arnot 86'

Hampden Park, Glasgow
Attendance: 4,372
Referee: Calum Scott

Rangers	Heart of Midlothian

GK	22	(New Zealand) Victoria Esson
DF	2	(Scotland) Nicola Docherty (c)
DF	3	(Scotland) Rachel McLauchlan
DF	4	(Scotland) Kathryn Hill
DF	6	(Netherlands) Tessel Middag	(substituted off) 60'
MF	19	(Scotland) Chelsea Cornet	(substituted off) 90'
MF	23	(Scotland) Kirsty Maclean	(substituted off) 60'
MF	24	(England) Olivia McLoughlin
FW	7	(Scotland) Brogan Hay	(substituted off) 60'
FW	9	(Scotland) Kirsty Howat	(substituted off) 87'
FW	15	(Scotland) Lizzie Arnot
Substitutes:
GK	22	(Scotland) Jenna Fife
MF	8	(Wales) Rachel Rowe	(substituted on) 60'
FW	10	(England) Rio Hardy	(substituted on) 60'
MF	12	(England) Libby Bance	(substituted on) 90'
FW	13	(Scotland) Jane Ross
MF	14	(Scotland) Mia McAulay	(substituted on) 60'
DF	16	(Scotland) Eilidh Austin
MF	17	(Scotland) Sarah Ewens	(substituted on) 87'
FW	26	(Scotland) Jodi McLeary
Manager:
(England) Jo Potter

GK	1	(Scotland) Charlotte Parker-Smith
DF	4	(Scotland) Emma Brownlie
DF	7	(Scotland) Monica Forsyth
DF	12	(England) Lizzie Waldie
DF	20	(Scotland) Carly Girasoli	(substituted off) 90'
DF	29	(Scotland) Jessica Husband	(substituted off) 83'
MF	6	(Republic of Ireland) Ciara Grant
MF	10	(England) Katie Lockwood
MF	28	(Scotland) Erin Husband	(substituted off) 90'
FW	16	(Jamaica) Sade Adamolekun	(substituted off) 59'
FW	21	(Scotland) Kathleen McGovern
Substitutes:
GK	52	(Scotland) Rachael Johnstone
DF	2	(Scotland) Jenna Penman	(substituted on) 90'
MF	8	(Scotland) Erin Rennie	(substituted on) 59'
FW	20	(Republic of Ireland) Kate Mooney	(substituted on) 83'
MF	27	(Scotland) Cailin Michie	(substituted on) 90'
MF	32	(Scotland) Olivia Chomczuk
DF	43	(Scotland) Kate Fraser
Manager:
(Spain) Eva Olid

Player of the Match:
Rachel McLauchlan

Assistant referees:
Vikki Robertson
Steven Wilson
Fourth official
Iain Snedden

Match rules

- 90 minutes
- 30 minutes of extra time if necessary
- Penalty shoot-out if scores still level
- Seven named substitutes
- Maximum of six substitutions in normal time
