= Jenna Fife =

Scottish footballer (born 1995)

Personal information
- Full name: Jenna Josephine Fife
- Date of birth: 1 December 1995 (age 30)
- Place of birth: Edinburgh, Scotland
- Height: 1.75 m (5 ft 9 in)
- Position: Goalkeeper

Team information
- Current team: Rangers
- Number: 1

Senior career*
Years	Team	Apps	(Gls)
2012	Murieston United		(0)
2013–2019	Hibernian	8	(0)
2014	→ Hutchison Vale (loan)		(0)
2019–	Rangers	103	(0)

International career^{‡}
2012	Scotland U17	1	(0)
2014	Scotland U19	1	(0)
2018–	Scotland	10	(0)
- * Club domestic league appearances and goals as of 01 May 2023 (UTC) ‡ National team caps and goals as of 8 April 2023 (UTC)

Jenna Josephine Fife (born 1 December 1995) is a Scottish footballer who plays as a goalkeeper for Rangers W.F.C. in the Scottish Women's Premier League (SWPL) and for the Scotland national team.

Fife's career began at Murieston United, and she joined Hibernian in 2013. She was loaned to Hutchison Vale in 2014 before returning to Hibernian that year. In the 2015–2016 year, Fife was selected for a scholarship administered by the University of Stirling, for study at Edinburgh College.

Internationally, Fife represented Scotland at under-17 and under-19 levels. She made her full international debut in 2018.

== Early life and education ==
Jenna Fife was born on 1 December 1995 in Scotland. Prior to her entry into football, Fife maintained an interest in the sport of tennis. Fife first started playing football at eight years of age during her early schooling years. From her first outing with the sport she greatly enjoyed the game. Fife initially began in football in outfield; later she focused her experiences in football as a goalkeeper.

Early inspiration for Fife in her football career included player Craig Gordon. More contemporary motivational players for her included Premier League members Kasper Schmeichel and David De Gea. Among female players, Fife said she admired United States goalkeeper Hope Solo.

In the 2015–16 year, Fife was selected by the scholarship Winning Students administered by the University of Stirling, for study at Edinburgh College.

== Club career ==
=== Murieston United ===
Fife started her career at Murieston United. She helped beat Hibernian as part of Murieston United in a July 2010 game as part of the South East Region Girls Under-15 League Cup final.

=== Hibernian ===
Fife subsequently joined Hibernian in January 2013. Fife was the only player from Murieston signed to Hibernian that year and one of three players picked that had not previously belonged to the Hibernian reserve squad. In April 2013, Fife assisted Hibernian to a win over Hamilton Academical The night before the game the team was surprised to learn their goalkeeper Shannon Lynn had decided to join another team. This development allowed Fife to serve in that capacity for the game. The Scotsman reported: "As a result, Jenna Fife made her first start of the season for the Easter Road girls. Her terrific debut included a first-half penalty save."

In the beginning of 2014 she had a short loan spell at Hutchison Vale, but was recalled to Hibernian in late April of that year.

Fife was rivaled in skill by Glasgow City players in a May 2015 game; BBC Sport noted of a significant play during the 3–3 tie game: "Erin Cuthbert laid the ball into the path of Hayley Lauder who instinctively fired an exquisite shot beyond Hibs goalkeeper Jenna Fife." After a 4–0 win against Aberdeen in May 2015, Chris Roberts of Hibernian reflected in an interview published in Edinburgh Evening News: "Aberdeen made full use of the high winds during the first half to put us under pressure. They came at us, went on the attack and although Jenna [Fife] was never really troubled, we were under a fair amount of pressure."

In June 2015, Hibernian faced Glasgow City in the Scottish Women's Premier League Cup with Fife in goal, but were defeated 2–1. Edinburgh Evening News wrote of the game: "Hibs would take a narrow lead into the interval although they had to survive a scare when goalkeeper Jenna Fife failed to take Hayley Lauder’s corner kick cleanly and Nicola Docherty stabbed the ball toward goal before Arnot headed off the line." The Herald described Fife's style of football play in the game: "City finally started to show why they have dominated Scottish women's football in the last 15 minutes of the half, but although the otherwise impressive Jenna Fife spilled a corner, the Hibs defence retained their composure to hold out for half time." Stornoway Gazette noted Fife had saved a shot against her in a June 2015 game versus Glasgow City She was bested by Glasgow City players in a June 2015 game, with The Scotsman reporting: "Nicky Docherty sent in a low free-kick with Kerry Montgomery getting the touch which beat Jenna Fife."

In August 2015, her two saves earned Hibernian a 3–3 draw against rivals Glasgow City BBC Sport noted of the game: "It should have been 2–1 when Hayley Lauder slipped through Julie Fleeting, however her first touch was poor and goalkeeper Jenna Fife saved at her feet." The Herald reported: "The high-level entertainment continued with Fife making a good smothering save from Fleeting before Hibs went ahead with a well-worked goal." The newspaper continued to note of Fife's total two saves in the game: "Fife made two great saves just before the hour from O'Sullivan and Lauren McMurchie, but she was then beaten by Docherty's curling shot from the left."

Hibernian lost to Glasgow City in October 2015 with the final score of 2–0. The Herald wrote of the game's slow development: "A tentative game finally found a goal after 57 minutes. Denise O'Sullivan's fine through ball left Lauder clear in the box, and although the Scotland player didn't hit her shot well, it was enough to beat goalkeeper Jenna Fife."

In November 2015, Hiberian faced Glasgow City in the Scottish Women's Premier League Cup but was defeated 3–0 by Glasgow City Weather was a serious factor in the game, with The Scotsman noting: "So much so that an early clearance from Hibs goalkeeper Jenna Fife was caught by the wind and almost blown back into her net it was so powerful at times." The Scotsman wrote of Fife's performance during the game: "it was Glasgow City that appeared the more likely to score with former Rangers midfielder Erin Cuthbert desperately unlucky not to notch a goal as she was denied firstly by the crossbar and then a stunning save from Fife."

=== Rangers ===
Fife signed a two-year contract with Rangers in December 2019.

== International career ==
Fife represented Scotland at the under-17 and under-19 level. She commented the highlight of her career as a player: "The first time I ever played for Scotland against Sweden at U17 level". In the under-19 group, Fife was one of five players representing Scotland from Hibernian.

In July 2015, she was called into camp for the senior national team. She was one of nine players from Hibernian selected for the Scotland Women's A squad in its August 2015 training camp. Fife said her career goal was to play in football as a representative of her native Scotland in a major competition against another country.

Scotland manager Shelley Kerr included Fife in the full international squad for the first time in October 2017. She made her international debut in January 2018 during Scotland's winter training camp in Spain, appearing as a substitute in friendly matches against Norway and Russia.

== Career statistics ==
=== International appearances ===
Scotland statistics accurate as of match played 11 April 2023.

Year	Scotland	
Year	Apps	Goals
2018	2	0
2019	2	0
2020	1	0
2021	2	0
2022	2	0
2023	1	0
Total	10	0

== Honours ==
=== Club ===
Hibernian

- Women's Scottish Cup: 2016, 2017, 2018
- Scottish Women's Premier League Cup: 2016, 2017, 2018, 2019

Rangers

- Scottish Women's Premier League: 2021–22
- Women's Scottish Cup: 2023–24; runner-up 2022–23
- Scottish Women's Premier League Cup: 2022–23, 2023–24, 2024–25
- City of Glasgow Women's Cup: 2022, 2023

=== International ===
- Pinatar Cup 2020
