= Caroline Heron =

Scottish footballer and cricketer

Personal information
- Full name: Caroline Heron
- Date of birth: 3 November 1990 (age 36)
- Place of birth: Montrose, Scotland
- Height: 1.72 m (5 ft 8 in)
- Position: Forward

Team information
- Current team: Heart of Midlothian
- Number: 14

College career
Years	Team	Apps	(Gls)
2010–2011	AIC Yellow Jackets	21	(8)

Senior career*
Years	Team	Apps	(Gls)
2011–2013	Forfar Farmington		
2014–2017	Hibernian		
2017–2018	Forfar Farmington		
2019–	Heart of Midlothian	2	(2)
- * Club domestic league appearances and goals as of 25 February 2019

Caroline Heron (born 3 November 1990) is a Scottish footballer who plays as forward for Heart of Midlothian in the SWPL 2, and former cricketer. She previously played for Forfar Farmington and Hibernian.

== Football career ==
=== College career ===
Heron joined the AIC Yellow Jackets in 2010. She scored her first collegiate goal in a victory against Bridgeport on 2 September 2010. She scored eight goals and added two assists in 13 appearances as a freshman, before suffering a season-ending injury in a win over Stonehill. In October 2010, she was selected to the Northeast-10 All-Conference Third-Team and All-Rookie team, and named Northeast-10 Rookie of the Year. The following year, she made 8 appearances and recorded one assist, but she was unable to finish the season due to an injury.

=== Club career ===
Heron joined SWPL 2 side Heart of Midlothian in 2019. She made her debut as a substitute against Hamilton Academical on 10 February 2019, and she made her first start a week later, scoring twice in a 9–0 win over Hutchison Vale.

== Cricket career ==
Caroline Heron
Personal information
- Born: 3 November 1990 (age 36)

International information
- National side: Scotland
- Source: Cricinfo, 8 December 2017

Heron was initially named in the Scottish squad for the 2008 Women's Cricket World Cup Qualifier, but she withdrew due to an injury and was replaced by Paula Ritchie.

== Honours ==
=== Club ===
Hibernian

- Scottish Women's Cup: 2016
- Scottish Women's Premier League Cup: 2017

=== Club ===
- Forfar Farmington Goal of the Season: 2018
