= Kirsty Smith =

Scottish footballer

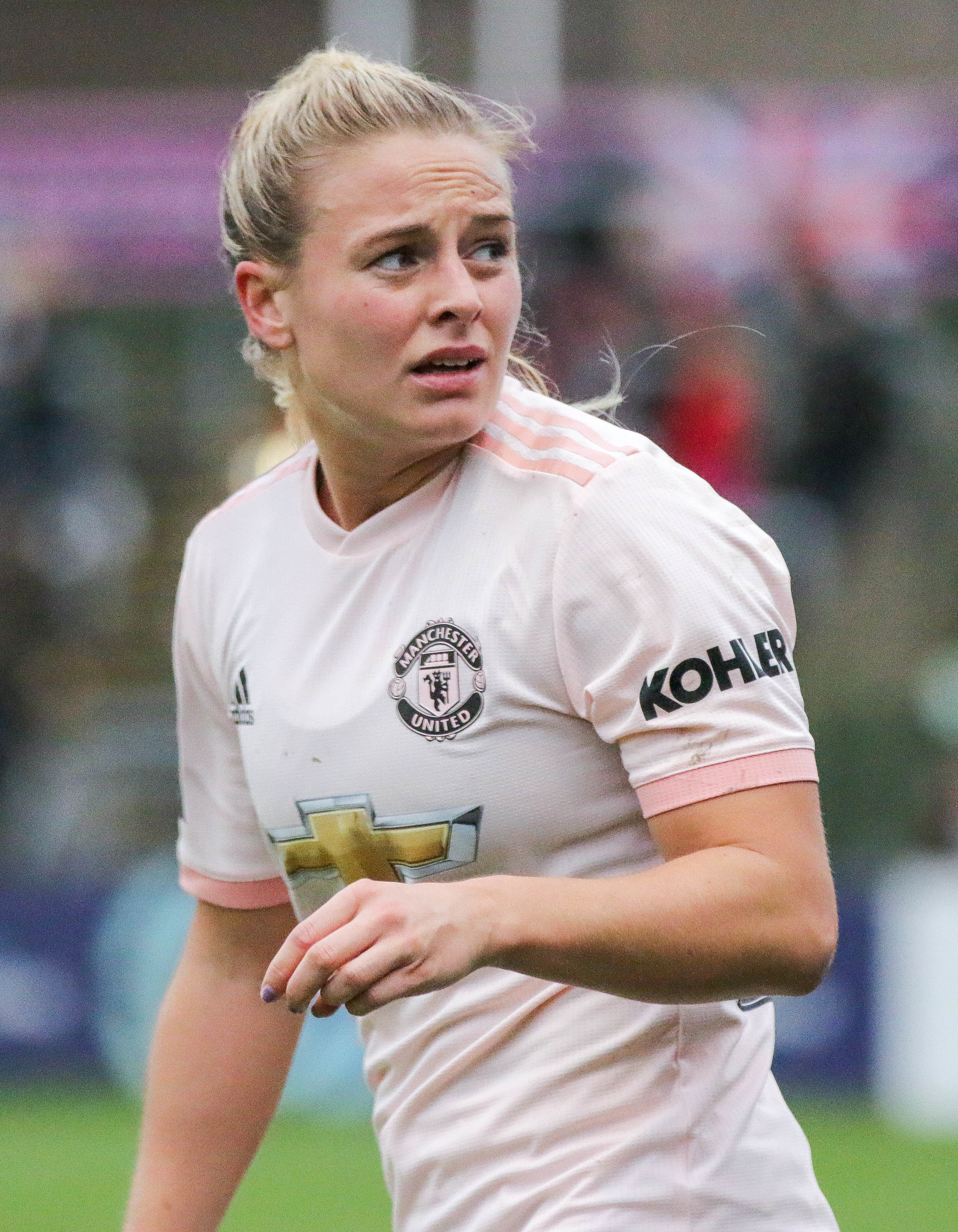
- Smith playing for Manchester United in 2018

Personal information
- Full name: Kirsty Anele Smith
- Date of birth: 6 January 1994 (age 32)
- Place of birth: Dalkeith, Scotland
- Height: 5 ft 5 in (1.64 m)
- Position: Defender

Team information
- Current team: Rangers
- Number: 22

Youth career
- 2006: Musselburgh Windsor
- 2007–2011: Hibernian

Senior career*
| Years | Team | Apps | (Gls) |
| 2011–2018 | Hibernian | 44+ | (17+) |
| 2018–2022 | Manchester United | 40 | (0) |
| 2022–2025 | West Ham United | 55 | (1) |
| 2025–2026 | Nottingham Forest | 12 | (1) |
| 2026– | Rangers | 0 | (0) |

International career^{‡}
| 2011 | Scotland U17 | 5 | (0) |
| 2011–2013 | Scotland U19 | 17 | (2) |
| 2014– | Scotland | 62 | (0) |
- * Club domestic league appearances and goals as of 5 May 2026 ‡ National team caps and goals as of 22 April 2025

Kirsty Anele Smith (born 6 January 1994) is a Scottish footballer who plays as a defender for Scottish Women's Premier League club Rangers and the Scotland national team.

== Club career ==
=== Hibernian ===
Smith started her career at Musselburgh Windsor. In July 2007, she joined Hibernian. She was part of the side that won consecutive Scottish domestic cup doubles in 2016 and 2017, and also finished as league runners-up on four occasions between 2013 and 2017.

=== Manchester United ===
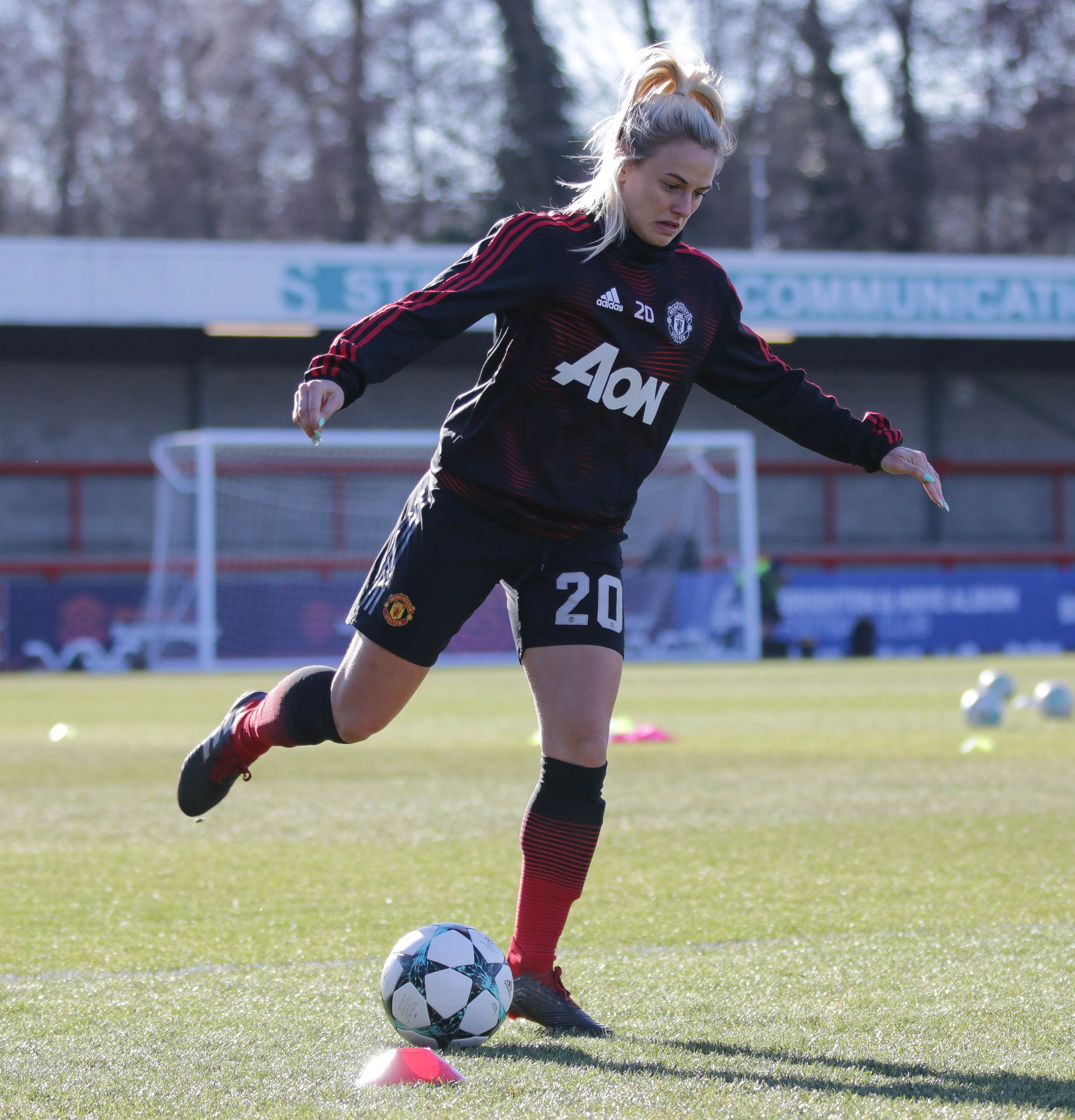
Smith warming up for Manchester United in 2019.

On 27 June 2018, it was announced that Smith and teammate Lizzie Arnot were leaving Hibernian; both signed with Manchester United for their inaugural season. Smith made her competitive debut for Manchester United in a 1–0 League Cup victory against Liverpool on 19 August, and her Championship debut in a 12–0 win against Aston Villa on 9 September. She made 16 league appearances as United won the Championship title and promotion to the FA WSL in their first season.

In the 2019–20 season, Smith scored her first goal for the club on 21 November 2019 in an 11–1 League Cup Group Stage victory over Championship team Leicester City.

=== West Ham United ===
On 15 July 2022, it was announced that Smith had signed a two-year deal with West Ham United, with the option to extend for a further year.

=== Nottingham Forest ===
On 14 July 2025, it was announced that Smith had signed a two-year deal with Nottingham Forest.

=== Rangers ===
On 9 July 2026, it was announced that Smith had signed a two-year contract with Scottish Women's Premier League club Rangers and would wear shirt number 22.

== International career ==
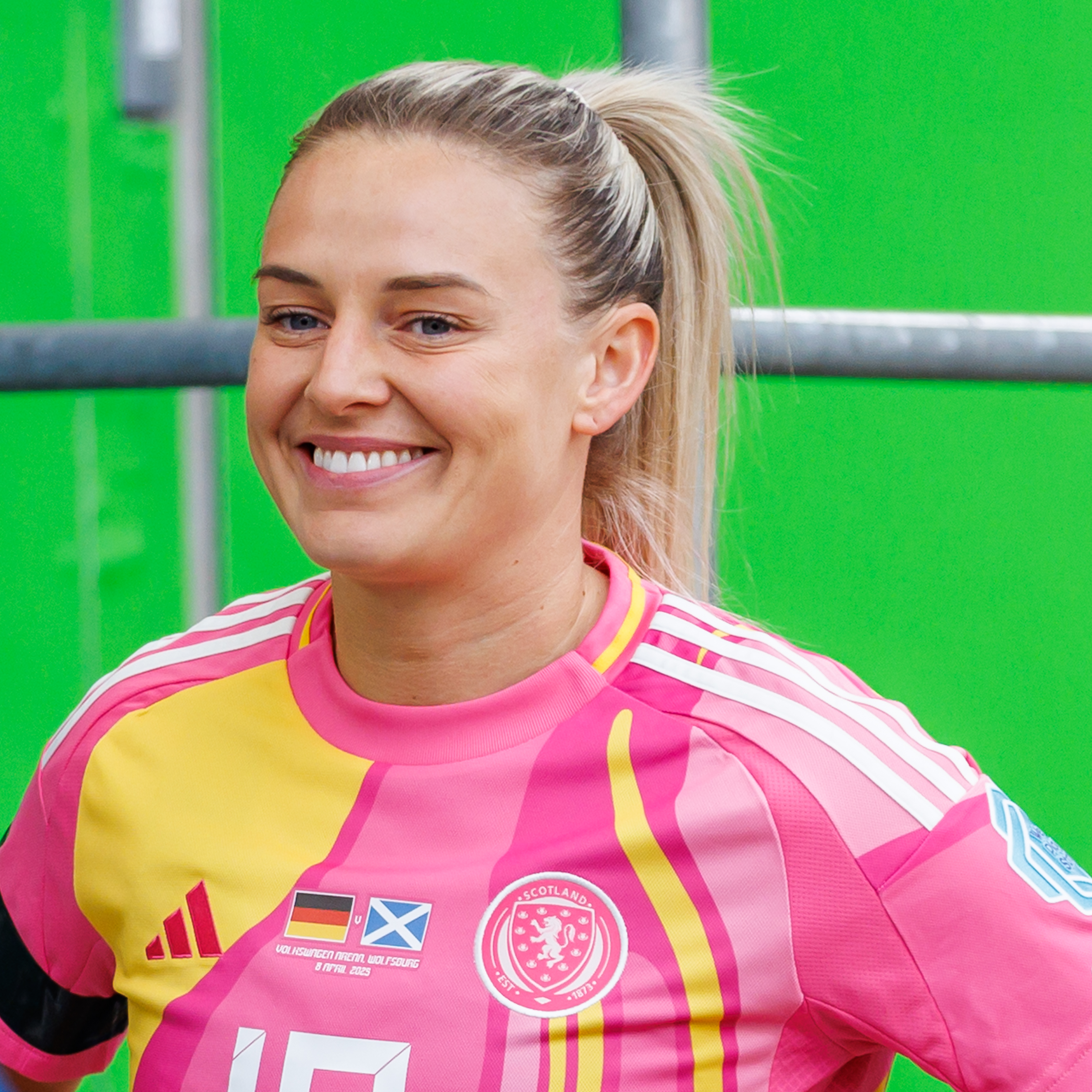
Smith in Scotland kit, 2025

Smith represented Scotland at under-17 and under-19 levels. Her UEFA competition debut for the under-17s was on 9 April 2011 against France.

On 30 October 2014, Smith made her senior international debut in a World Cup qualification play-off against the Netherlands. She was a 79th minute substitute, coming on for Caroline Weir.

On 15 May 2019, Smith was named in the Scotland squad for the 2019 FIFA Women's World Cup, the nation's first ever appearance at the tournament.

== Personal life ==
In 2017, Smith graduated with a degree in Accountancy and Finance from Heriot-Watt University.

Between 2023-2024 she was in a relationship with Australian goalkeeper and former West Ham teammate Mackenzie Arnold.

== Career statistics ==
=== International appearances ===
As of the match played on 8 April 2025

| National team | Year | Apps | Goals |
|---|---|---|---|
| Scotland | 2014 | 1 | 0 |
| Scotland | 2015 | 9 | 0 |
| Scotland | 2016 | 7 | 0 |
| Scotland | 2017 | 8 | 0 |
| Scotland | 2018 | 5 | 0 |
| Scotland | 2019 | 9 | 0 |
| Scotland | 2020 | 4 | 0 |
| Scotland | 2021 | 1 | 0 |
| Scotland | 2022 | 2 | 0 |
| Scotland | 2023 | 3 | 0 |
| Scotland | 2024 | 10 | 0 |
| Scotland | 2025 | 3 | 0 |
| Total | | 62 | 0 |

== Honours ==
Hibernian

- Scottish Women's Cup: 2016, 2017
  - Runner-up 2013, 2015
- Scottish Women's Premier League Cup: 2016, 2017, 2018
  - Runner-up 2014, 2015

Manchester United

- FA Women's Championship: 2018–19
