= Bonnyrigg Rose Ladies F.C. =

- Full name: Bonnyrigg Rose Ladies Football Club
- Nickname(s): The Roses
- Founded: 2022
- Ground: Poltonhall
- Capacity: 2,500
- Chairman: Charlie Kirkwood
- Head Coach: Jamie Carter
- League: Scottish Women's Football League One, Scottish Women's Cup
- 2022–23: Promoted from Regional Leagues
- Website: https://www.bonnyriggrosefc.co.uk
Home colours	Away colours	Third colours

Bonnyrigg Rose Ladies Football Club is a Scottish women's football club based in the town of Bonnyrigg, Scotland. The club was formed in 2022 and currently competes in the Scottish Women's Football League One, the fourth tier of women's football in Scotland.

== History ==
Bonnyrigg Rose Ladies F.C. was formed in March 2022, when the club decided to establish a women's team to compete in the Scottish women's football pyramid. Prior to this, the club had previously had youth teams competing at various levels.

The team made its debut in the 2022/23 season, earning promotion from the Regional Leagues to the Scottish Women's Football League One, the fourth tier of women's football in Scotland. Their home matches are played at Poltonhall in Bonnyrigg.

== Stadium ==
Bonnyrigg Rose Ladies F.C. play their home matches at Poltonhall in Bonnyrigg, Scotland. The ground has a capacity of 2,500.
