= Kirsten Reilly =

Scottish footballer

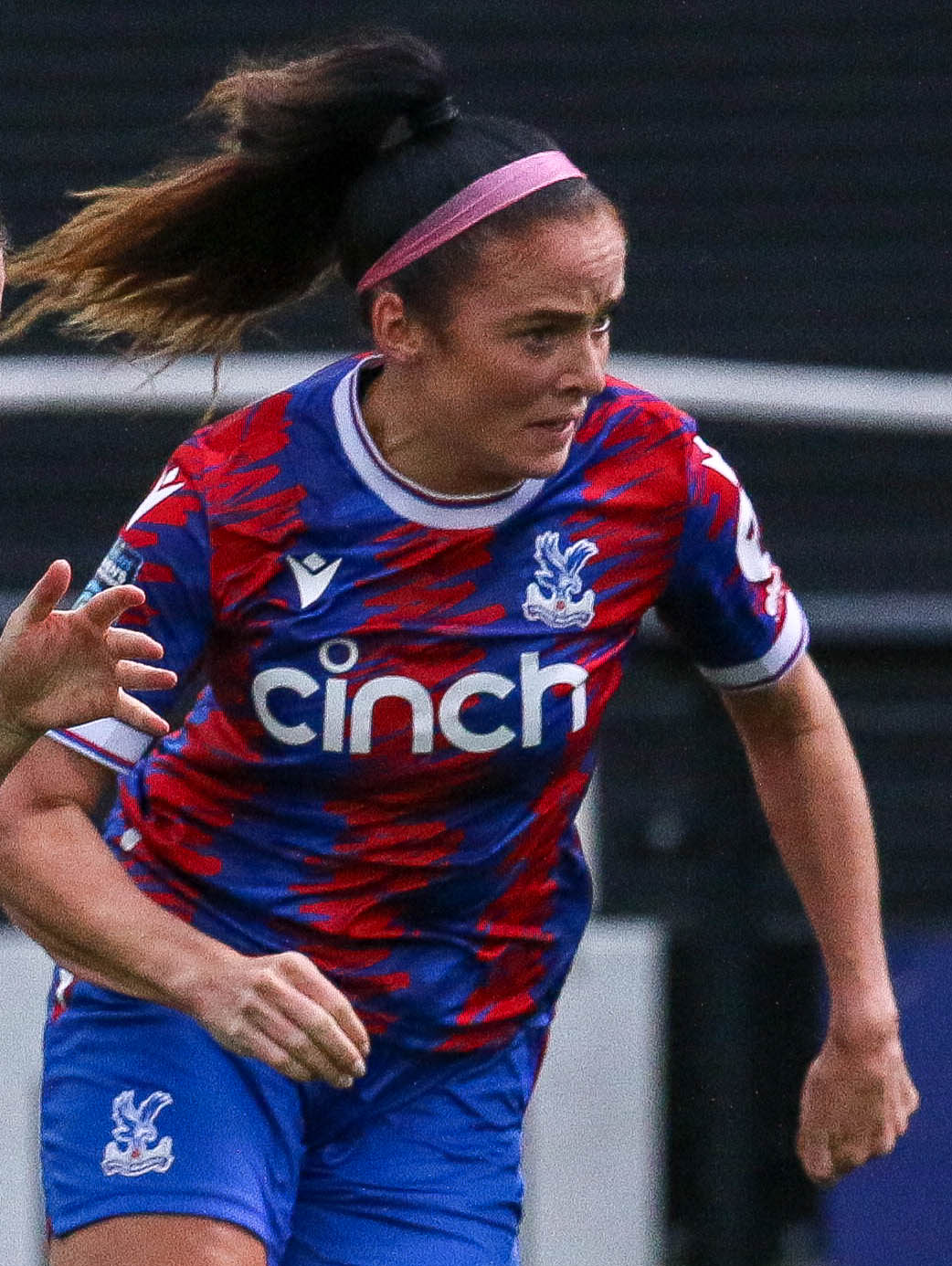
- Reilly in 2022

Personal information
- Full name: Kirsten Jane Reilly
- Date of birth: 20 August 1995 (age 31)
- Place of birth: Musselburgh, Scotland
- Position: Midfielder

Team information
- Current team: Hibernian
- Number: 32

College career
Years	Team	Apps	(Gls)
2013–2016	West Alabama Tigers	57	(19)

Senior career*
Years	Team	Apps	(Gls)
2017	Heart of Midlothian		
2017–2018	Stirling University		
2018–2019	Hibernian		
2019	Bristol City	3	(0)
2020–2022	Rangers	41	(8)
2022–2024	Crystal Palace	35	(0)
2024-	Hibernian	19	(4)
- * Club domestic league appearances and goals as of 22 February 2025

Kirsten Jane Reilly (born 20 August 1995) is a Scottish footballer who plays as a midfielder for Hibernian in the Scottish Women's Premier League.

== Early life and education ==
Born in Edinburgh to Kathryn and John Reilly, Kirsten was raised with her sibling Neil in Musselburgh where she attended Musselburgh Grammar School. As a youth, she played for Musselburgh Windsor and Heart of Midlothian.

== Playing career ==
=== University of West Alabama Tigers, 2013–16 ===
Reilly attended the University of West Alabama where she played for the UWA Tigers from 2013 to 2016. As a freshman, she was named to the Gulf South Conference All-Tournament Team, scored one goal and provided three assists. During her sophomore season, she scored three goals, including two game-winners, and recorded two assists. As a junior, Reilly scored nine goals during the 2015 season, including seven game winners that ranked second in the Gulf South Conference (GSC). Twice named GGSC Player of the Week, Reilly provided six assists on goals scored by other players.

=== Hibernian, 2018–19 ===
Reilly signed with Hibernian ahead of the 2018 Scottish Women's Premier League season. She helped Hibs finish second in the league and qualify for the 2019–20 UEFA Women's Champions League, also winning two SWPL Cups and the Scottish Women's Cup in 2018.

=== Bristol City, 2019 ===
On 13 September 2019, Reilly signed with Bristol City for the 2019–20 FA WSL season. She made her debut for the team the following week in a 3–0 League Cup win over London Bees and made her only FA WSL appearance coming on as an 89th minute substitute in a 3–3 draw with Reading.

=== Rangers, 2020–2022 ===
On 21 December 2019, Reilly announced her return to the SWPL, signing an 18-month contract with Rangers ahead of the 2020 season.
