= Paula Ritchie =

Scottish cricketer

Cricket information
- Bowling: right arm medium
- Role: middle order batswoman

International information
- National side: Scotland
- Source: Cricinfo, 8 December 2017

Paula Ritchie is a Scottish woman cricketer. She made her international debut for Scotland during the 2008 Women's Cricket World Cup Qualifier after replacing Caroline Heron who was initially named in the squad due to injury. She plays club cricket for Ferguslie Club in Scotland.
