= 2018 Scottish Women's Cup =

Tournament details
- Country: Scotland

Final positions
- Champions: Hibernian
- Runners-up: Motherwell

The 2018 SWF Scottish Cup, known as the 2018 SSE Scottish Women's Cup for sponsorship reasons, was the 47th official edition (49th overall) of the main national cup competition in Scottish women's football for that calendar year. All teams in the Scottish Women's Football League and SWPL 1 & 2 were eligible to enter.

== Quarter-finals ==
Teams in bold advanced to the semi-finals.

Home team	Score	Away team
16 September 2018
Spartans (1)	3–1	**Celtic** (1)
Renfrew (3)	0–11	**Glasgow City** (1)
EU Hutchison Vale (2)	0–11	**Hibernian** (1)
St Johnstone (2)	0–1	**Motherwell** (2)

== Semi-finals ==
Teams in bold advanced to the final.

14 October 2018	**Hibernian**	**2–1**	Glasgow City	Stirling
12:00	Reilly 14'; Murray 81'		Hunter 87' (o.g.)	Stadium: Forthbank Stadium

14 October 2018	Spartans	**1–3**	**Motherwell**	Stirling
15:30	Reynolds 23'		Burns; Montgomery 56'; Russell	Stadium: Forthbank Stadium

== Final ==
The final was played on 4 November 2018 at Firhill Stadium in Glasgow. A new trophy was unveiled a few days prior to the event.

Hibernian won the final 8–0 against Motherwell. It was their third Scottish Cup win in a row.

4 November 2018
16:10

Hibernian	8–0	Motherwell
Harrison 2', 15'; Napier 6', 50', 63'; Davidson 33'; Welsh 35' (o.g.); Michie 40'	Report

Firhill Stadium, Glasgow
Attendance: 1,943

**Hibernian**	**Motherwell**

(Scotland) Jenna Fife
(Scotland) Emma Brownlie (substituted off) 79'
(Scotland) Joelle Murray (c)
(Scotland) Siobhan Hunter (substituted off) 59'
(Scotland) Cailin Michie
(Scotland) Lisa Robertson
(Scotland) Kirsten Reilly
(Scotland) Rachel McLauchlan
(Scotland) Chelsea Cornet (substituted off) 59'
(Scotland) Jamie-Lee Napier (substituted off) 70'
(Scotland) Abi Harrison (substituted off) 30'
Substitutes:
(Scotland) Ellis Notley (substituted on) 59'
(Scotland) Clare Williamson (substituted on) 79'
(Scotland) Lia Tweedie (substituted on) 70'
(Scotland) Amy Gallacher (substituted on) 59'
(Scotland) Lauren Davidson (substituted on) 30'
(Scotland) Shannon McGregor
Manager:
(Scotland) Grant Scott

(Scotland) Autumn Farrell
(Scotland) Emma Black
(Scotland) Ashley Nicolson
(Scotland) Maxine Welsh (substituted off) 46'
(Scotland) Lesley Condie
(Scotland) Kirsty McLaughlin
(Scotland) Katey Turner (substituted off) 70'
(Scotland) Megan Burns
(Scotland) Hayley Cunningham
(Scotland) Sammy Hare (substituted off) 78'
(Scotland) Suzanne Mulvey (c)
Substitutes:
(Scotland) Kendall Welsh
(Scotland) Lauryn Reside (substituted on) 70'
(Northern Ireland) Kerry Montgomery
(Scotland) Caitlin Russell (substituted on) 46'
(Northern Ireland) Kaitlyn Canavan (substituted on) 78'
Manager:
(Scotland) Donald Jennow
