= 2007–08 Scottish Women's Premier League Cup =

Tournament details
- Country: Scotland

Final positions
- Champions: Hibernian
- Runners-up: Queen's Park

Tournament statistics
- Matches played: 10
- Goals scored: 67 (6.7 per match)

The 2007–08 Scottish Women's Premier League Cup was the 6th edition of the Scottish Women's Premier League Cup which began in 2002. It was contested by all 12 teams of the Scottish Women's Premier League (SWPL), with matches played between August and November 2007.

== First Round ==
Hamilton Academical, Newburgh, Queen's Park and Vale of Clyde received byes.

Teams in bold advanced to the quarter-finals.

Home team	Score	Away team
19 August 2007
Edinburgh	2–7	**Hibernian**
Raith Rovers	0–7	**Glasgow City**
2 September 2007
**Aberdeen**	4–3	FC Kilmarnock
Forfar Farmington	2–3 (Note: After extra time; 1–1 after 90 minutes.)	**Celtic**

== Quarter-finals ==
Teams in bold advanced to the semi-finals.

Home team	Score	Away team
16 September 2007
Celtic	0–1	**Glasgow City**
**Queen's Park**	w/o (Note: Newburgh withdrew from the competition and folded.)	Newburgh
**Aberdeen**	2–1	Hamilton Academical
23 September 2007
Vale of Clyde	1–17	**Hibernian**

== Semi-finals ==
Teams in bold advanced to the final.

17 October 2007

Glasgow City	3–5	Hibernian

17 October 2007

Queen's Park	3–2	Aberdeen

== Final ==
Hibernian won the trophy for the second time. They also won the 2007–08 Scottish Women's Cup at the end of the season.

10 November 2007
14:00

Hibernian	4–0	Queen's Park
Little; Grant

Forthbank Stadium, Stirling

**Hibernian**	**Queen's Park**
