= Sarah Crilly =

Scottish footballer

Personal information
- Date of birth: 17 October 1991 (age 35)
- Place of birth: Lanark, Scotland
- Height: 4 ft 11 in (1.50 m)
- Position: Midfielder

Team information
- Current team: Motherwell
- Number: 7

Youth career
- Hamilton Academical

Senior career*
Years	Team	Apps	(Gls)
–2012	Hamilton Academical		
2013–2016	Glasgow City		
2017–2018	Celtic		
2019–	Motherwell		

International career^{‡}
2012–2013	Scotland	4	(2)
- * Club domestic league appearances and goals as of 12:00, 4 March 2011 (UTC) ‡ National team caps and goals as of 10:00, 3 December 2016 (UTC)

Sarah Crilly (born 17 October 1991) is a Scottish footballer who plays for Scottish Women's Premier League (SWPL) club Motherwell, typically as a winger. Crilly has four caps and two goals for the Scotland women's national football team.

== Club career ==
Crilly joined Hamilton Academical at youth team level and progressed to playing for the first team in the SWPL, including winning the club's Player of the Month award for September 2012.

In December 2012, Crilly signed for league champions Glasgow City, where she had already been a transfer target for a number of years. She scored in her debut appearance during the 2013 season opener against Rangers, which Glasgow City won 3–2.

Crilly made her European debut and featured prominently in Glasgow City's 2013–14 UEFA Women's Champions League campaign. During the group stage, she scored 5 goals in 3 games - one goal each against Osijek and FC Twente and a hat-trick against Birkirkara - leading Glasgow City to finish top of Group 8. On 17 October, Crilly added to her Champions League total in the Round of 32 against Standard Liège, scoring one goal and assisting on a Denise O'Sullivan volley in a 3–1 second leg victory, helping Glasgow City to a 5–3 aggregate win and progression to the Round of 16.

During Crilly's first season with Glasgow City, the club won the SWPL, the Scottish Women's Cup, and the SWPL Cup, completing their second successive domestic treble.

Crilly later suffered a long-term knee injury that kept her out of football for almost two years; she returned to play in the semi-finals of the 2015 Scottish Cup against Rangers on 11 October, which Glasgow City won 2–0. On 18 October, Crilly made an appearance as a substitute in a league match against Aberdeen; Glasgow City's 3–1 victory secured the 2015 SWPL title. She also played in the Scottish Cup final, which Glasgow City won 3–0 over Hibernian, earning Glasgow City their fourth consecutive domestic treble.

During the 2016 season, Crilly scored Glasgow City's only Champions League goal in a 1–3 aggregate defeat against Eskilstuna in the Round of 32. On 16 October, she scored four goals in the Scottish Cup semi-final against SWPL 2 side Glasgow Girls, which Glasgow City won 9–0. Crilly opened scoring in Glasgow City's 3–1 win over Hibernian on 23 October; the result left Glasgow City eight points clear with one game remaining, securing the SWPL title - Glasgow City's 10th in a row.

In December 2016 Crilly left Glasgow City to sign for Celtic.

== International career ==
At youth levels, Crilly represented Scotland in the 2008 UEFA Women's Under-17 Championship; she was the tournament's top scorer in the first qualifying round with 5 goals in 3 games, leading Scotland to the top of Group 8. At U-19 level she also represented Scotland during their qualification for the 2010 UEFA Women's Under-19 Championship but was held out of the finals due to injury.

After Scotland suffered a series of injuries during an August 2012 friendly against Norway at East End Park, national coach Anna Signeul called on Crilly, who was at the match as a spectator. Wearing oversized borrowed kit and boots, Crilly came on as a second-half substitute and scored the equalising goal in the 2–2 draw.

Following her debut, Crilly made three further appearances - all also as a substitute - for the senior national team, her last during the 2013 Torneio Internacional de Brasília in which she scored against Chile. After injuries kept her out of football for almost two years, Crilly was selected for a July 2016 national training camp in preparation for Euro 2017 qualifiers but later withdrew from the camp.

Crilly also attended the Scottish Football Association's (SFA) National Performance Centre at the University of Stirling, graduating in 2014.
