= Clare Shine =

Irish footballer (born 1995)

Personal information
- Full name: Clare Shine
- Date of birth: 18 May 1995 (age 31)
- Place of birth: Cork, Ireland
- Height: 1.56 m (5 ft 1 in)
- Position: Forward

Team information
- Current team: Glasgow City
- Number: 10

Youth career
- Douglas Hall AFC

Senior career*
Years	Team	Apps	(Gls)
2011-2012	Cork Women's	16	(5)
2013–2015	Raheny United	20	(13)
2015–2017	Glasgow City		
2017–2019	Cork City	23	(18)
2019–2022	Glasgow City		(13)

International career^{‡}
2010–2012	Republic of Ireland U17		
2011–2014	Republic of Ireland U19	5	(4)
2015–2022	Republic of Ireland	7	(0)
- * Club domestic league appearances and goals as of 5 April 2019 ‡ National team caps and goals as of 28 November 2015

Clare Shine (born 18 May 1995) is an Irish former international footballer who most recently played for SWPL club Glasgow City. She previously played for Women's National League (WNL) club Cork City. She made her debut for the Republic of Ireland women's national football team in November 2015. Shine attended Regina Mundi College in Douglas, Cork and played in an All-Ireland Senior Camogie Championship Final for Cork.

== Club career ==
After beginning her career with Douglas Hall AFC, Shine joined Cork City Women's when the Women's National League (WNL) was formed in 2011. In 2013, she transferred to Raheny United and collected a league and FAI Women's Cup double with "The Pandas". She also represented the club in the UEFA Women's Champions League.

Shine's career was interrupted by a broken leg and a period out of the game when she tried to come back too quickly from the injury. In May 2015 she moved to Scotland to join Glasgow City after a successful two-week trial. In November 2015 Shine scored a hat-trick in City's 3–0 Scottish Women's Cup final win over Hibernian.

In March 2017, Shine brought her spell with Glasgow City to an end and returned home to Cork City, (Note: During Shine's absence the previously-independent women's club in Cork had merged into men's League of Ireland club Cork City FC.) partly because she wanted to start playing Gaelic games again. She scored the only goal of the 2017 FAI Women's Cup final, as Cork beat UCD Waves 1–0 at the Aviva Stadium in November 2017.

In 2019, Shine re-joined Glasgow City and scored on her second debut in a 5–1 win over Stirling University. She left the club on 24 September 2022, announcing her retirement from football.

== International career ==
Shine was 15 when she was part of the under-17 squad who lost the final of the 2010 UEFA Women's Under-17 Championship in Switzerland. She then participated in Ireland's 2010 FIFA U-17 Women's World Cup campaign. At the 2014 UEFA Women's Under-19 Championship, Shine scored the only goal against Spain as Ireland won their group, before crashing 4–0 to the Netherlands in the semi-final. She had recovered from a broken leg sustained 10 weeks earlier.

National coach Susan Ronan gave Shine a senior debut in a 3–0 UEFA Women's Euro 2017 qualifying defeat by Spain on 26 November 2015 at Tallaght Stadium, Dublin.
