= 2006–07 Scottish Women's Cup =

Tournament details
- Country: Scotland

Final positions
- Champions: Hibernian
- Runners-up: Glasgow City

The 2006–07 Scottish Women's Cup was the 36th official edition (38th overall) of the Scottish Women's Cup, the main knockout tournament in women's football in Scotland. Sponsored by Amicus, matches were played between January and May 2007.

== Third round ==
Teams in bold advanced to the quarter-finals.

Home team	Score	Away team
6 March 2007
Inverness	1–5	**FC Kilmarnock**
**Raith Rovers**	6–1	Team Strathclyde
Lochee United	0–3	**Forfar Farmington**
**Edinburgh**	4–1	Queen's Park
11 March 2007
**Newburgh**	4–1	Hutchison Vale
18 March 2007
**Glasgow City**	w/o	Dumfries
21 March 2007
**Hibernian**	6–1	Arsenal North
22 March 2007
**Hamilton Academical**	9–0	Tynecastle

== Quarter-finals ==
Teams in bold advanced to the semi-finals.

Home team	Score	Away team
21 March 2007
Forfar Farmington	1–3	**FC Kilmarnock**
Edinburgh	1–3	**Glasgow City**
25 March 2007
Hamilton Academical	1–2	**Newburgh**
Raith Rovers	1–5	**Hibernian**

== Semi-finals ==
Teams in bold advanced to the final.

17 April 2007

FC Kilmarnock	1–3	Glasgow City

19 April 2007

Newburgh	1–3	Hibernian

Dalziel Park, Motherwell

== Final ==
Hibernian claimed the Scottish Cup trophy for the third time overall, after previous wins in 2003 and 2005, convincingly defeating holders Glasgow City. Hibs also won the 2006–07 Scottish Women's Premier League with a 100% record, with the only blot on their season being a surprise loss to Edinburgh in the SWPL Cup final earlier in the campaign.

20 May 2007

Glasgow City	1–5	Hibernian
Ross		Grant; D. Dalziel (o.g); Little; L. Kennedy

McDiarmid Park, Perth
Referee: Stuart Dougal

**Glasgow City**	**Hibernian**
