= 2010 Scottish Women's Cup =

Tournament details
- Country: Scotland

Final positions
- Champions: Hibernian
- Runners-up: Rangers

The 2010 Scottish Women's Cup was the 39th official edition (41st overall) of the Scottish Women's Cup, the main knockout tournament in women's football in Scotland. With the schedule having been changed from autumn-spring to summer, no Scottish Cup was played during the shortened 2009 Scottish Women's Premier League and instead it was held over to the next year, to remain as the end-of season showpiece but now played in the latter part of the calendar year: matches in the 2010 tournament (which was sponsored by Unite) were played between May and November, with the final taking place 18 months after that of the 2008–09 season.

== Third round ==
Teams in bold advanced to the quarter-finals.

Home team	Score	Away team
29 August 2010
Dee Vale	3–6	**Heart of Midlothian**
**Glasgow City**	11–1	Glasgow City Reserves
Dundee United SC	w/o	**Celtic**
Hibernian Reserves	0–1	**Inverness**
**Hibernian**	3–1	Spartans
**Celtic**	5–0	Aberdeen
Cowdenbeath	0–4	**Hamilton Academical**
**Rangers**	w/o	Aberdeen University

== Quarter-finals ==
Teams in bold advanced to the semi-finals.

Home team	Score	Away team
26 September 2010
**Hibernian**	1–1 (Note: After extra time; Hibernian won 4–2 in a penalty shootout.)	Celtic
**Glasgow City**	18–0	Heart of Midlothian
**Rangers**	2–1	Hamilton Academical
**Celtic Reserves**	3–1	Inverness

== Semi-finals ==
Teams in bold advanced to the final.

21 October 2010

Glasgow City	1–2	Hibernian

Toryglen Regional Football Centre, Glasgow
21 October 2010

Celtic Reserves	1–1 (a.e.t.)	Rangers
Penalties
	4–5

== Final ==
Hibernian won the trophy for the fifth time in their history, coming from behind to beat Rangers who lost their second Scottish Cup final in succession. During their run to the final, Hibs eliminated the three clubs who were above them in the 2010 Scottish Women's Premier League (Spartans, Celtic and Glasgow City, who were also the cup holders).

17 November 2010
15:15

Rangers	1–2	Hibernian
L. McMaster 11'		L. Kennedy 70'; J. Ross 83'

Recreation Park, Alloa

**Rangers**	**Hibernian**
