= 2007–08 Scottish Women's Cup =

Tournament details
- Country: Scotland

Final positions
- Champions: Hibernian
- Runners-up: Celtic

The 2007–08 Scottish Women's Cup was the 37th official edition (39th overall) of the Scottish Women's Cup, the main knockout tournament in women's football in Scotland. Sponsored by Unite, matches were played from January to May 2008.

== Third round ==
Teams in bold advanced to the quarter-finals.

Home team	Score	Away team
2 March 2008
**Hutchison Vale**	1–0	Vale of Clyde
Dundee United SC	1–4 (Note: After extra time)	**Celtic**
Forfar Farmington	2–5	**Hamilton Academical**
**Cowdenbeath**	4–1	Team Strathclyde
9 March 2008
Paisley Saints	0–6	**Aberdeen**
16 March 2008
**Inverness**	5–2	Troon
Maryhill	3–5	Raith Rovers
23 March 2008
FC Kilmarnock	0–3	**Hibernian**

== Quarter-finals ==
Teams in bold advanced to the semi-finals.

Home team	Score	Away team
30 March 2008
Hutchison Vale	2–4	**Hibernian**
**Aberdeen**	2–0	Raith Rovers
6 April 2008
**Celtic**	12–0	Hamilton Academical
**Inverness**	6–0	Cowdenbeath

== Semi-finals ==
Teams in bold advanced to the final.

17 April 2008

Inverness	0–3	Hibernian

6 May 2008

Aberdeen	2–3	Celtic

Dalziel Park, Motherwell

== Final ==
Holders Hibernian retained the cup for their fourth win overall. They were made to work for their victory by first-time finalists Celtic, in their first season competing under the identity of the famous men's club (they took over existing league members Arsenal North), who had eliminated Glasgow City in an early round. Hibs had also won the 2007–08 Scottish Women's Premier League Cup earlier in the season, but lost out in the SWPL championship to Glasgow City a week after their Scottish Cup win.

17 May 2008

Celtic	1–3 (a.e.t.)	Hibernian
Crichton 108'		Murray 97'; M. Burns 101'; Grant 107'

McDiarmid Park, Perth
Referee: Norma Watt

**Celtic**	**Hibernian**
