= Carla Boyce =

Association football player

Personal information
- Full name: Carla Jane Boyce
- Date of birth: 29 December 1998 (age 27)
- Place of birth: East Kilbride, Scotland
- Position: Forward

Team information
- Current team: Partick Thistle
- Number: 9

Youth career
- E.K. Thistle Girls
- 2013–2014: Glasgow City

Senior career*
Years	Team	Apps	(Gls)
2014–2018	Glasgow City		
2016	→ Spartans (loan)	6	(0)
2018–2020	Rangers		
2020–2021	Hibernian		(6)
2021–	Motherwell	27	(10)

International career^{‡}
2013–2015	Scotland U17	13	(1)
2014	Scotland U16	2	(0)
2015–2017	Scotland U19	14	(4)
- * Club domestic league appearances and goals as of 01 May 2023 ‡ National team caps and goals as of 7 May 2022

Carla Jane Boyce (born 29 December 1998) is a Scottish footballer who plays as a forward for Motherwell in the Scottish Women's Premier League (SWPL). She previously played for Glasgow City, Rangers and Hibernian in the top flight of Scottish women's football, and for the Scotland under-19 team.

== Club career ==
Boyce began her senior career at Glasgow City in 2013. She made her UEFA Women's Champions League debut on 11 August 2014 in a 1–0 victory over Glentoran BU. She helped her team reach the quarter-finals of the competition before they were eventually defeated by Paris Saint-Germain. Boyce was a member of the City squad that won four consecutive SWPL titles between 2014 and 2017 as well as the Scottish Cup in 2014 and 2015 and the SWPL Cup in 2015, also spending time on loan with Spartans in 2016.

On 9 January 2018, Boyce transferred to fellow Glasgow-based side Rangers. She made her debut the following month in a 3–0 defeat to rivals Celtic. She scored her first goal for Rangers in a 2–1 win over Spartans.

Boyce left Rangers to join Hibernian on 8 January 2020. She once again scored her first goal against Spartans in a 2–1 win. She went on to score six goals in 26 appearances for the club, but was allowed to leave due to Hibs having other options in her position.

In November 2021, Boyce transferred to fellow SWPL club Motherwell, and scored a hat-trick on her debut in a 4–3 win over Aberdeen. She had five goals in 16 appearances up to May 2022.

== International career ==
Boyce began her Scotland international career at under-16 level, where she made two appearances. Her debut match was on 21 February 2014 in a 1–1 draw against Norway Under-16s.

She was then given her debut for the under-17s and went on to make 13 appearances for them. She scored her only goal for the Under-17s team on 11 July 2013 in a 1–1 draw against Portugal.

In 2015, she was promoted to the under-19s, where she scored four goals in 14 games. Her debut goal came on 15 September 2016 in a 4–2 victory over Albania. She last represented her country on 11 August 2017 in a 1–1 draw with Northern Ireland.
