= Rachael Boyle =

Scottish footballer

Personal information
- Date of birth: 20 December 1991 (age 34)
- Place of birth: Aberdeen, Scotland
- Position: Midfielder

Team information
- Current team: Hibernian
- Number: 23

Senior career*
Years	Team	Apps	(Gls)
- Aberdeen
2010–2013	Forfar Farmington		
2013–2016	Aberdeen		
2016–	Hibernian		

International career^{‡}
2007–2008	Scotland U17		
2008–2010	Scotland U19		
2010–	Scotland	43	(0)
- * Club domestic league appearances and goals as of 10:37, 11 May 2017 (UTC) ‡ National team caps and goals as of 05:01, 11 June 2021 (UTC)

Rachael Boyle (née Small; born 20 December 1991) is a Scottish international footballer who currently plays as midfielder for Hibernian in the Scottish Women's Premier League.

== Career ==
Boyle grew up in Aberdeen and represented Scotland at schools' level in 2005 while a pupil at Northfield Academy. She later progressed through the national under-17 and under-19 squads, captaining the latter in the 2010 UEFA Women's Under-19 Championship finals in Macedonia. She made her full debut for the Scotland women's team in July 2010 against Poland.

At club level, Boyle began with her hometown team, Aberdeen Ladies before moving to Forfar Farmington in 2010. She also attended the Scottish FA's North Regional Football Academy in Aberdeen.

In July 2013, Boyle returned to Aberdeen after Forfar failed to make the top six at the SWPL mid-season split.

Boyle joined Hibernian Ladies in July 2016, with her fiancé Martin Boyle playing for the Edinburgh club's men's side at the same time. After winning the Scottish Women's Cup in 2016 and 2017, and the SWPL Cup in 2017, she missed much of the 2018 season due to pregnancy, and gave birth to a daughter in September 2018. She and Martin Boyle married in June 2019.

She was recalled to the Scotland squad in November 2019.

Due to the upheaval it would cause to their daughter, Rachael opted to stay in Edinburgh when Martin left Hibs to play in Saudi Arabia in January 2022.

Boyle returned to play well in February 2022, a year after the birth of a daughter. She scored twice for Hibs and played two games before she damaged her anterior cruciate ligament. She was still at home in March 2024 complaining that she had not played for so long.

== Career statistics ==
=== International appearances ===
As of the match played on 11 April 2023

Appearances and goals by national team and year
National team	Year	Apps	Goals
Scotland	2010	1	0
Scotland	2011	8	0
Scotland	2012	17	0
Scotland	2013	2	0
Scotland	2014	—	
Scotland	2015	—	
Scotland	2016	—	
Scotland	2017	1	0
Scotland	2018	2	0
Scotland	2019	—	
Scotland	2020	6	0
Scotland	2021	6	0
Total		43	0
