= Cheryl McCulloch =

Scottish footballer (born 1990)

Personal information
- Date of birth: 1 January 1990 (age 36)
- Place of birth: Scotland
- Position: Defender

Team information
- Current team: Partick Thistle
- Number: 4

Senior career*
Years	Team	Apps	(Gls)
- Queen's Park
2011–2013	Hamilton Academical	45	(29)
2014–2016	Glasgow City		
2017–2021	Celtic	41	(4)
2022–	Partick Thistle		

International career
2007	Scotland U17		
2008–2009	Scotland U19		
- * Club domestic league appearances and goals

Cheryl McCulloch (born 1 January 1990) is a Scottish football defender who plays for Partick Thistle in the Scottish Women's Premier League (SWPL), the top-division football league in Scotland.

== Club career ==
McCulloch played at Queen's Park and Hamilton Academical before she joined Glasgow City in February 2014.

== International career ==
McCulloch has represented Scotland at the under-17 and under-19 levels. In July 2015, she was called into training camp for the senior national team.
