= Emma Brownlie =

Scottish footballer (born 1993)

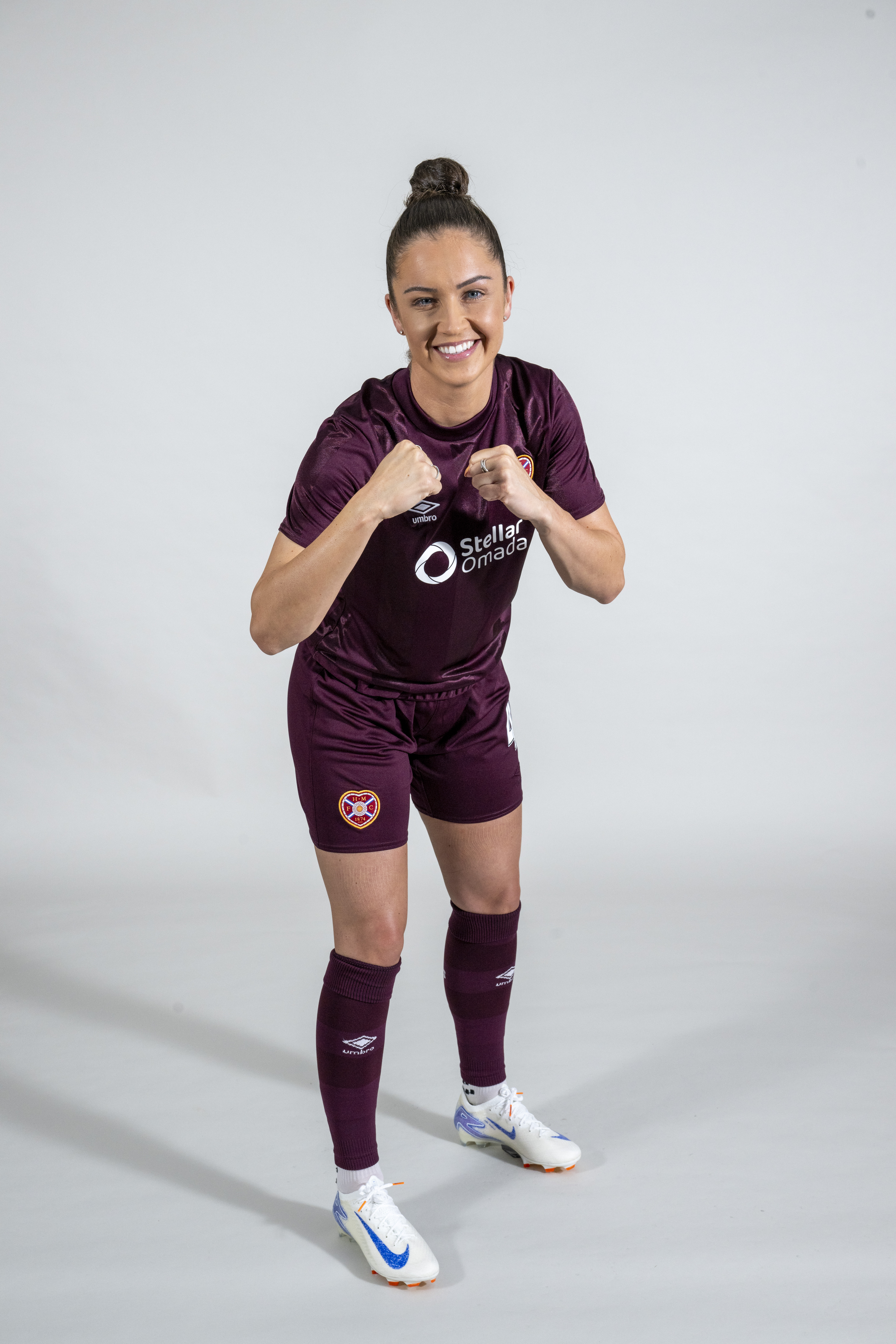

Personal information
- Full name: Emma Brownlie
- Date of birth: 4 September 1993 (age 33)
- Place of birth: Dunfermline, Scotland
- Position: Defender

Team information
- Current team: Glasgow City
- Number: 24

Senior career*
Years	Team	Apps	(Gls)
2011–2012	Hibernian	24	(0)
2013–2015	Celtic	20	(3)
2015–2018	Hibernian	0	(0)
2019	Everton	7	(0)
2019–2022	Rangers	0	(0)
2022–2025	Heart of Midlothian	25	(4)
2025–	Glasgow City	0	(0)

International career^{‡}
2011–2012	Scotland U19	7	(0)
- * Club domestic league appearances and goals as of 01 May 2023 (UTC) ‡ National team caps and goals as of 10 March 2019

Emma Brownlie (born 4 September 1993) is a Scottish footballer who plays as a defender for Glasgow City in the Scottish Women's Premier League. She has represented Scotland on the Scotland under-19 national team.

Brownlie has spent the majority of her career in Scotland, with a stint in England, having played for Heart of Midlothian, Rangers, Everton, Hibernian, Celtic and Glasgow City.

== Club career ==
Brownlie started her career with Hibernian before moving to Celtic in 2013 then rejoining Hibs in January 2015.

In January 2019, Brownlie signed with FA WSL side Everton L.F.C., reuniting her with former Hibernian manager, Willie Kirk. She made her debut for the Blues against Chelsea in the FA Women's Cup.

In September 2019, Brownlie joined Rangers. On 4 July 2021, she signed a contract extension with the club. On 31 July 2022, it was announced that Brownlie would depart the club and join Hearts at the end of her contract.

In 2022, Brownlie joined Hearts on a one-year contract until the end of the 2022/23 season. She was named SWPL player of the month for January 2023. In June 2023, Brownlie signed a two-year contract extension with Hearts, committing to the club until 2025. Brownlie captained the club in the 2023–24 Women's Scottish Cup final, as Hearts lost 2–0 to Rangers.

On 4 July 2025, Brownlie was announced at Glasgow City on a two year contract.

== International career ==
Brownlie has been called up and played for the Scotland under-19 national team. Her stints with the under-19s both participated in qualification to the 2011 and 2012 UEFA Women's Under-19 Championship.
