= Hayley Lauder =

Scottish footballer (born 1990)

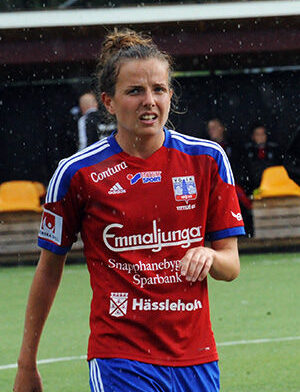
- Playing for Vittsjö in 2014

Personal information
- Full name: Hayley Lauder
- Date of birth: 4 June 1990 (age 36)
- Place of birth: West Lothian, Scotland
- Height: 1.70 m (5 ft 7 in)
- Positions: Left wing; forward

Team information
- Current team: Glasgow City
- Number: 4

Youth career
- Murieston United Girls

Senior career*
Years	Team	Apps	(Gls)
2007–2011	Spartans Women		
2011	Apollon Ladies		
2012	Åland United	26	(18)
2012–2013	Mallbackens IF	22	(1)
2013–2014	Vittsjö GIK	19	(1)
2014–	Glasgow City	189	(71)

International career^{‡}
2007–2009	Scotland U19	16	(3)
2010–	Scotland	106	(9)
- * Club domestic league appearances and goals as of 11 December 2014 ‡ National team caps and goals as of 17 April 2024

Hayley Lauder (born 4 June 1990) is a Scottish professional footballer who plays for Glasgow City of the Scottish Women's Premier League and the Scotland women's national team. After beginning her senior career with Spartans, she played for Apollon Limassol in the 2011–12 Champions League qualifying stage. Lauder then moved on to Finland, with Åland United, before spending a single season with both Mallbackens IF and Vittsjö GIK of the Swedish Damallsvenskan.

== Club career ==
Lauder came through the ranks at Murieston Girls. She switched to Spartans Women—then called Edinburgh Ladies—in August 2007.

=== Apollon Limassol ===
In August 2011, Lauder and compatriot Frankie Brown joined Apollon Limassol for their 2011–12 UEFA Women's Champions League campaign. During her first appearance for the club on 11 August, she scored a hat-trick helping Limassol defeat Progrès Niedercorn 14–0. Two days later, she scored a brace against Swansea City contributing to an 8–0 rout. Her third and final appearance occurred on 16 August when Limassol defeated Legenda 2–1. In her three appearances, she contributed five goals and played for a total of 227 minutes. The club was eliminated from the tournament in the 16th finals after being defeated a 3–4 aggregate by Czech Republic side, Sparta Praha.

=== Åland United ===
Lauder agreed to a one-year professional contract with Finnish Naisten Liiga side Åland United in February 2012. During a match against ONS on 22 September, she scored a hat-trick during the team's 6–0 win. She scored a brace on 29 September during the club's 6–0 win over TPS. She scored her second brace of the season on 21 July against ONS helping Åland United win 7–0. In her 26 appearances for the club, she scored a total of 18 goals, including the hat-trick and four braces. Åland United finished second during the regular season just two points shy of first place team PK-35.

=== Mallbackens IF ===
After joining fellow Scotland national team players Emma Mitchell and Jane Ross for trials in Sweden during the 2012 close season, Lauder agreed to join Damallsvenskan newcomers Mallbackens IF in December 2012.

=== Vittsjö GIK ===
With Mallbackens relegated at the end of the 2013 Damallsvenskan season, Lauder signed for Vittsjö GIK in December 2013, joining fellow Scottish internationals Jane Ross and Ifeoma Dieke at the club.

=== Glasgow City ===
In December 2014 Lauder agreed a return to Scottish football with reigning champions Glasgow City. She was available to play in City's UEFA Women's Champions League upcoming quarter-final tie against Paris Saint-Germain Féminines.

== International career ==
Having played at youth level, including at the 2008 UEFA Women's Under-19 Championship finals, Lauder made her senior Scotland debut in March 2010, against Italy in the Cyprus Cup. She scored her first goal for the national team five days later; in a 2–1 win over South Africa at the same tournament.

In February 2011, Lauder scored twice in a 4–2 win over Wales in Haverfordwest. At the 2011 Cyprus Cup, Lauder provided the cross for Jen Beattie to score Scotland's second goal in their 2–0 win over England. She has also deputised at full-back for the national side, to cover for injuries to regular defensive players.

She made her 100th appearance for Scotland on 14 June 2019, during the 2019 FIFA Women's World Cup.

Lauder was recalled to the squad in November 2023, over three years since her last selection.

== Career statistics ==
=== International appearances ===
Scotland statistics accurate as of 17 April 2024.

Year	Scotland	
Year	Apps	Goals
2010	5	1
2011	13	4
2012	15	2
2013	17	1
2014	14	0
2015	9	1
2016	6	0
2017	9	0
2018	5	0
2019	8	0
2020	2	0
2023	1	0
2024	2	0
Total	106	9

=== International goals ===
Results list Scotland's goal tally first.

#	Date	Venue	Opponent	Result	Competition	Scored
1	3 March 2010	GSZ Stadium, Larnaca	South Africa	2–1	2010 Cyprus Cup	1
3	13 February 2011	Bridge Meadow Stadium, Haverfordwest	Wales	4–2	Friendly	2
4	21 September 2011	Tynecastle Park, Edinburgh	Finland	7–2	Friendly	1
5	12 October 2011	Ness Ziona Stadium, Ness Ziona	Israel	6–1	2013 UEFA Women's Championship qual.	1
6	1 March 2012	GSP Stadium, Nicosia	Netherlands	2–1	2012 Cyprus Cup	1
7	16 June 2012	Tynecastle Park, Edinburgh	Israel	8–0	2013 UEFA Women's Championship qual.	1
8	15 December 2013	Estádio Nacional Mané Garrincha, Brasília	Brazil	1–3	2013 Torneio Internacional de Brasília de Futebol Feminino	1
9	29 November 2015	St Mirren Park, Paisley	Macedonia	10–0	2017 EURO qual.	1

== See also ==
- List of women's footballers with 100 or more caps
- Scottish FA Women's International Roll of Honour
