= Hibernian W.F.C. =

Scottish women's football team

Hibernian Women
- Full name: Hibernian Football Club Women
- Nicknames: Hibs, The Hibees
- Founded: 1997 (as Preston Athletic); 1999 (as Hibernian Ladies)
- Ground: Meadowbank Stadium, Edinburgh
- Head Coach: Joelle Murray
- League: SWPL 1
- 2025-26: SWPL 1, 4th of 12
- Website: https://www.hibernianfc.co.uk/
Home colours

Hibernian Football Club Women is a women's football team based in Edinburgh that plays in the Scottish Women's Premier League, the top division of football in Scotland. They were officially integrated as a department of Hibernian F.C. in 2022, having previously been linked less formally via their community foundation, using the club's training facilities and colours.

Hibs Women have won the Scottish Women's Premier League Cup a competition-record seven times, as well as lifting the Scottish Women's Cup eight times. The club has competed in the UEFA Women's Cup and UEFA Women's Champions League.

The club's most recent Scottish Women's Premier League title success occurred during the 2024–25 season.

== History ==
Founded in 1997 by Iain Johnston and Paul Johnston, for the initial two seasons of its existence the club was under the auspices of Preston Athletic. The name changed to Hibernian Ladies in 1999 and they became one of the leading women's teams in Scotland. After being temporarily voted out of the Scottish Women's Premier League by its other member clubs in 2005 after officials failed to attend the body's AGM (subsequently downgraded to a warning and small fine), in 2006–07 Hibs secured a domestic double, finishing the league campaign with a 100% record. The club has won the league championship three times and then represented Scotland in the UEFA Women's Cup. In that competition they failed to progress beyond the first round in each instance, finishing second twice and third once in the group stage.

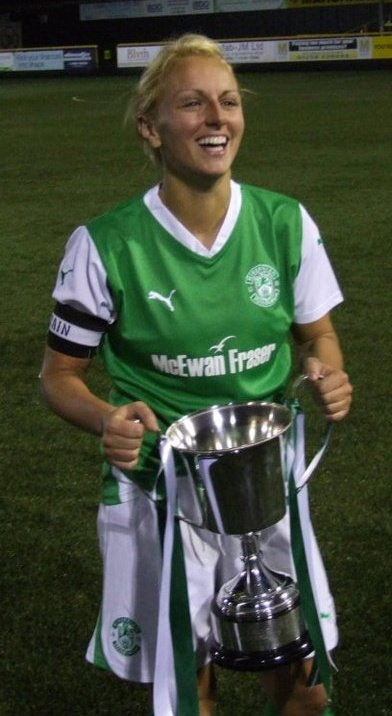
Hibs' Rhonda Jones with the Scottish Women's Cup trophy in 2010

Hibernian won the Women's Scottish Cup in 2010, for the fifth time in eight years. The team's success in the national cup competition was in contrast to their male affiliate, who had not won the Scottish Cup for over a century until their victory in 2016.

In January 2011, six Hibernian players were called into the Scotland national team. In May 2011, Hibernian beat local rivals Spartans 5–2 in the Scottish Women's Premier League Cup final.

Hibernian won domestic cup doubles in 2016, 2017 and 2018.

Ahead of the 2020 season, the club was rebranded as Hibernian Women and offered their first part-time professional contracts. The senior team was fully integrated into the men's club in July 2022, with the youth sides still being run by the Hibernian Community Foundation.

Hibernian won the Scottish league championship in 2024–25, clinching the title by winning a deciding match on the final day of the season against Rangers at Ibrox. BBC Sport said before the match that it would arguably be the most surprising league championship in Great Britain that season given the increased funding for the Glasgow clubs since Hibs had last won the title in 2007. It also noted that Hibs had finished fifth, 36 points behind the league champions, in the previous season.

== Stadium ==
For the 2011 season, Hibernian moved into Albyn Park, Broxburn, the home of junior football club Broxburn Athletic. The club had previously played its home matches on the training ground of Hibernian F.C. in East Lothian. Hibs then used Ainslie Park in Edinburgh as their regular home ground for several seasons, but have also played one-off games at Easter Road. They moved into the Almondvale Stadium in Livingston for the 2021–22 season.

The team moved into the refurbished Meadowbank Stadium in July 2022, as part of a wider partnership between Hibernian and Edinburgh City (then known as FC Edinburgh).

== Current squad ==
As of 2 August 2026

Note: Flags indicate national team as defined under FIFA eligibility rules; some limited exceptions apply. Players may hold more than one non-FIFA nationality.

No.	Pos.	Nation	Player
1	GK	GRE	Ariana Anastasiadis
2	DF	ENG	Faye Bryson
3	DF	SCO	Caley Gibb
4	DF	SCO	Siobhan Hunter
5	DF	IRL	Scarlett Herron
6	MF	NIR	Joely Andrews
7	FW	AUS	Milly Boughton
8	MF	IRL	Jessica Fitzgerald
11	FW	UKR	Yuliia Khrystiuk
14	DF	SCO	Jess Broadrick
15	FW	IRL	Aoife Colvill

No.	Pos.	Nation	Player
16	DF	SCO	Ellis Notley
19	MF	SCO	Isla Taylor
20	MF	SCO	Jess Ramsay
23	MF	SCO	Rachael Boyle
24	MF	SCO	Tegan Bowie
25	GK	SCO	Rowena Armitage
27	FW	SCO	Tiree Burchill
29	FW	SCO	Kirsty Morrison
31	MF	SCO	Linzi Taylor
32	MF	SCO	Kirsten Reilly
71	FW	AUS	Kyah Simon

=== Out on loan ===
Note: Flags indicate national team as defined under FIFA eligibility rules; some limited exceptions apply. Players may hold more than one non-FIFA nationality.

No.	Pos.	Nation	Player

== Coaching staff ==
Position	Name
Head Coach	(Scotland) Joelle Murray
Assistant Coach	(Scotland) Calum Smith
Goalkeeping Coach	(Scotland) Rachel Harrison

== List of Managers ==
- Willie Kirk (2011–13)
- Chris Roberts (2014–17)
- Kevin Milne (2017–18)
- Grant Scott (2018–2019)
- Dean Gibson (2020–2023)
- Grant Scott (2023–2025)
- Joelle Murray (2025–present)

== Honours ==
- Scottish Women's Premier League
  - Winners (4): 2003–04, 2005–06, 2006–07, 2024–25
  - Runners-up (9): 2002–03, 2004–05, 2007–08, 2013, 2015, 2016, 2017, 2018, 2019
- Scottish Women's Cup
  - Winners (8): 2002–03, 2004–05, 2006–07, 2007–08, 2010, 2016, 2017, 2018
  - Runners-up (4): 2011, 2013, 2015, 2019
- Scottish Women's Premier League Cup
  - Winners (7): 2004–05, 2007–08, 2011, 2016, 2017, 2018, 2019
  - Runners-up (6): 2006–07, 2009, 2014, 2015, 2022, 2025

=== European history ===
Hibernian have participated in six seasons of UEFA competitions.

Season	Competition	Round	Opposition	Score		
Season	Competition	Round	Opposition	First Leg	Second Leg	Aggregate
2004–05	UEFA Cup	First Qualifying Round	(Croatia) ŽNK Maksimir	5–0		
2004–05	UEFA Cup	First Qualifying Round	(Belgium) KFC Rapide Wezemaal	3–2		
2004–05	UEFA Cup	First Qualifying Round	(Serbia) ZFK Masinac Classic Niš	1–5		
2006–07	UEFA Cup	First Qualifying Round	(Spain) RCD Espanyol	1–4		
2006–07	UEFA Cup	First Qualifying Round	(Faroe Islands) KÍ Klaksvík	2–1		
2006–07	UEFA Cup	First Qualifying Round	(France) FCF Juvisy	0–6		
2007–08	UEFA Cup	First Qualifying Round	(Austria) SV Neulengbach	3–4		
2007–08	UEFA Cup	First Qualifying Round	(Poland) Gol Częstochowa	4–1		
2007–08	UEFA Cup	First Qualifying Round	(Republic of Ireland) Mayo Ladies League	8–0		
2016–17	Champions League	Round of 32	(Germany) Bayern Munich	0–6	1–4	1–10
2017–18	Champions League	Qualifying Round	(Wales) Swansea City	5–0		
2017–18	Champions League	Qualifying Round	(Ukraine) WFC Zhytlobud-2 Kharkiv	1–1		
2017–18	Champions League	Qualifying Round	(Romania) CFF Olimpia Cluj	1–1		
2019–20	Champions League	Qualifying Round	(Georgia (country)) Tbilisi Nike	3–0		
2019–20	Champions League	Qualifying Round	(Wales) Cardiff Met.	2–1		
2019–20	Champions League	Qualifying Round	(Slovenia) Pomurje	2–1		
2019–20	Champions League	Round of 32	(Czech Republic) Slavia Praha	1–4	1–5	2–9
2025–26	Champions League	Second Qualifying Round	(Denmark) Fortuna Hjørring	1–2		
2025–26	Champions League	Second Qualifying Round	(Cyprus) Apollon Ladies	3–2		
2025–26	Europa Cup	First Qualifying Round	(Italy) Inter Milan	1–4	0–1	1–5

=== Former players ===
For notable former players, see Category:Hibernian W.F.C. players.
