= Women's Scottish Cup =

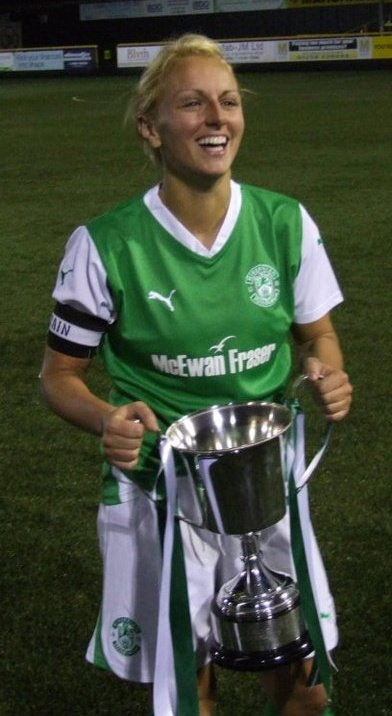
- Rhonda Jones of Hibernian with the Scottish Women's Cup trophy in 2010
- Organiser(s): Scottish Football Association
- Founded: 1970
- Region: Scotland
- Teams: 67
- Related competitions: SWFL Cup, SWPL Cup
- Current champions: Celtic (3rd title)
- Most championships: Glasgow City (9 titles)
- Website: Official website
- 2025–26 Women's Scottish Cup

The Women's Scottish Cup is the national knockout cup competition for women's football in Scotland.

First held in 1970–71 and known as the Scottish Women's FA Cup, the competition was owned and managed by Scottish Women's Football (SWF), an affiliated body of the Scottish Football Association (SFA). The competition was rebranded in 2022 by the SFA. It is open to all senior teams affiliated with Scottish Women's Football and the SWPL. Rangers are the current holders, having won the 2025 final. The competition is currently sponsored by Scottish Gas.

== Format ==
The competition consists of a preliminary round and then several progressively reducing rounds of which the last one is the final. The twenty teams from the Scottish Women's Premier League enter at the third round. 33 teams from the Football League and Highland League are drawn in the preliminary round. The 17 winners from these ties are joined by 11 teams from League One for the first round. For round two, the 14 winners are joined by 10 teams from the Championship. The 12 winners are then joined by 20 teams from the Scottish Women's Premier League for round three. The 16 winners then play the Fourth round, then Quarter-finals and Semi-finals. All rounds are played over a single leg (the rules for the composition of the rounds were updated for the 2023–24 season).

A new trophy was introduced for the 2018 season, but it was only played for three times before being replaced again for the 2022–23 season when the Scottish Football Association took direct control of the competition, which had previously been organised through Scottish Women's Football. The 2018 trophy is now displayed at the Scottish Football Museum.

The current Women’s Scottish Cup trophy was designed and made by Thomas Lyte. The trophy features a logo inspired by Mackintosh Rose – first depicted in a painting by the Scottish artist, Margaret Mackintosh – as well as the thistle, a symbol synonymous with the country.

== List of winners ==
The finals of the cup have been (total wins in parentheses):

Season	Winner	Score	Runner Up	Venue	Ref
1970–71	Stewarton Thistle (1)	4–2	Aberdeen Prima Donnas	Dundee	
1971–72	Stewarton Thistle (2)	8–1	Aberdeen Prima Donnas	East Kilbride	
1972	Edinburgh Dynamos (1)	5–3	Cambuslang Hooverettes	Linwood	
1973	Westthorn United (1)	7–3	Edinburgh Dynamos	Townhead Park	
1974	Motherwell AEI (1)	1–0	Westthorn United	Warout Stadium	
1974–75	Edinburgh Dynamos (2)	3–0	Motherwell AEI	Townhead Park	
1975–76	Edinburgh Dynamos (3)	6–3	Dundee Strikers	Memorial Park	
1976–77	Westthorn United (2)	4–0	Dundee Strikers	Warout Stadium	
1977–78	Dundee Strikers (1)	9–3	Whitehill		
1978–79	Edinburgh Dynamos (4)	2–0	Whitehill		
1979–80	Motherwell AEI (2)	3–2	Dundee Striker		
1980–81	Motherwell AEI (3)	2–0	Edinburgh Dynamos		
1981–82	Whitehill Ladies (1)	–	Inveralmond Thistle		
1982–83	Wishaw Ladies (1)	3–2	Whitehill Ladies		
1983–84	Allanton Miners Ladies (1)	–	Whitehill Ladies		
1984–85	Wishaw Ladies (2)	4–3	Edinburgh Dynamos	West Calder	
1985–86	Inveralmond Thistle (1)	–	Whitehill Ladies		
1986–87	Inveralmond Thistle (2)	–	Cumbernauld Ladies		
1987–88	Whitehill Ladies (2)	2–1	Inveralmond Thistle		
1988–89	Whitehill Ladies (3)	4–1	Livingston Thistle		
1989–90	Whitehill Ladies (4)	3–0	Cumbernauld Ladies	Newtongrange	
1990–91	Cumbernauld Ladies (1)	4–1	Inveralmond Thistle		
1991–92	Cumbernauld Ladies (2)	7–3	Inveralmond Thistle		
1992–93	Hutchison Vale (1)	5–2	Cumbernauld Ladies		
1993–94	Hutchison Vale (2)	3–0	Tynecastle	Links Park	
1994–95	Cove Rangers (1)	5–1	Cumbernauld Ladies	McDiarmid Park	
1999–96	Cove Rangers (2)	5–1	Aberdeen	McDiarmid Park	
1996–97	Cove Rangers (3)	5–4	Ayr United	Broadwood Stadium	
1997–98	Cumbernauld United (3)	3–1	Giulianos	Forthbank Stadium	
1998–99	Cumbernauld United (4)	1–0	Ayr United		
1999–2000	Stenhousemuir (1)	9–0	Clyde	Forthbank Stadium	
2000–01	FC Kilmarnock (3)	3–3 (a.e.t.); 3–2 (p)	Ayr United	Almondvale Stadium	
2001–02	FC Kilmarnock (4)	5–0	Glasgow City	Almondvale Stadium	
2002–03	Hibernian (1)	2–2 (a.e.t.); 5–4 (p)	FC Kilmarnock	Almondvale Stadium	
2003–04	Glasgow City (1)	3–0	Queen's Park	Almondvale Stadium	
2004–05	Hibernian (2)	8–0	Cove Rangers	McDiarmid Park	
2005–06	Glasgow City (2)	5–1	Aberdeen	McDiarmid Park	
2006–07	Hibernian (3)	5–1	Glasgow City	McDiarmid Park	
2007–08	Hibernian (4)	3–1 (a.e.t.)	Celtic	McDiarmid Park	
2008–09	Glasgow City (3)	5–0	Rangers	Forthbank Stadium	
2010	Hibernian (5)	2–1	Rangers	Recreation Park	
2011	Glasgow City (4)	3–0	Hibernian	Toryglen Regional Football Centre	
2012	Glasgow City (5)	1–0	Forfar Farmington	Excelsior Stadium	
2013	Glasgow City (6)	1–0	Hibernian	Broadwood Stadium	
2014	Glasgow City (7)	5–0	Spartans	Broadwood Stadium	
2015	Glasgow City (8)	3–0	Hibernian	Ainslie Park	
2016	Hibernian (6)	1–1 (a.e.t.); 6–5 (p)	Glasgow City	New Douglas Park	
2017	Hibernian (7)	3–0	Glasgow City	Almondvale Stadium	
2018	Hibernian (8)	8–0	Motherwell	Firhill Stadium	
2019	Glasgow City (9)	4–3	Hibernian	Tynecastle Park	
2020	Not contested due to COVID-19 pandemic				
2020–21	Not contested due to COVID-19 pandemic				
2021–22	Celtic (1)	3–2 (a.e.t.)	Glasgow City	Tynecastle Park	
2022–23	Celtic (2)	2–0	Rangers	Hampden Park	
2023–24	Rangers (1)	2–0	Heart of Midlothian	Hampden Park	
2024–25	Rangers (2)	3–0	Glasgow City	Hampden Park	
2025–26	Celtic (3)	1–0	Rangers	Hampden Park	
