= 2025–26 Scottish Women's Premier League Cup =

Tournament details
- Country: Scotland
- Teams: 20

Final positions
- Champions: Glasgow City
- Runners-up: Rangers

Tournament statistics
- Matches played: 19

The 2025–26 Scottish Women's Premier League Cup was the 24th edition of the Scottish Women's Premier League's league cup competition, which began in 2002. It was sponsored by Sky Sports and officially known as the Sky Sports Scottish Women's Premier League Cup. The competition was contested by all 20 teams of the two divisions of the Scottish Women's Premier League (SWPL 1 and SWPL 2).

Rangers were the three-time defending champions and reached the final for the fourth year in succession, but lost to Glasgow City.

== First round ==
7 September 2025	Dundee United	1–1 (a.e.t.) (7–8 p)	Kilmarnock	Dundee
15:30	K. Frew 12'	Report	K. Canavan 49'	Stadium: Foundation Park

7 September 2025	Livingston	4–0	East Fife	Livingston
14:00	V. Strain 10'; M. Whiteford 21'; J.C. Murphy 33'; L. Strain 49'	Report		Stadium: Almondvale Stadium

7 September 2025	Stirling University	2–5	St Johnstone
14:00	M. Paterson 41'; O. McHarg 62'	Report	E. McLean 6'; J. Malcolm 26', 89'; R. Howie 37'; S. Simson 87' (pen.)

7 September 2025	Boroughmuir Thistle	0–1 (a.e.t.)	Gartcairn
13:00		Report	G. Robb 113'

== Second round ==
15 October 2025	Hamilton Academical	0–5	Glasgow City
16:00		Report	L. Forrest 45'; S. Maatta 52', 54'; M. Tanaka 75'; N. Kozlova 80'

15 October 2025	Heart of Midlothian	7–0	Montrose	Riccarton
15:00	C. Johns 5', 10'; G. Hunter 21', 51'; G. Timms 42'; K. Jardine 48'; J. Slattery 78'	Report		Stadium: Oriam

15 October 2025	Gartcairn	1–3	Queen's Park
14:00	M. Anderson 45+3' (pen.)	Report	E. Kane 46', 90+1'; S. Thomson 67'

15 October 2025	Spartans	1–3	Celtic	Edinburgh
14:00	I. Young 43'	Report	G. Courter 5'; A. Gallacher 19'; S. Noonan 57'	Stadium: Ainslie Park

15 October 2025	Aberdeen	3–1	Kilmarnock
13:00	A. Black 52'; H. Stewart 79'; K.A. Beattie 87'	Report	K. Crainie 57'

15 October 2025	Hibernian	9–0	Motherwell	Edinburgh
13:00		Report	T. Bowie 10'; K. McGovern 19', 43' (pen.); T. Burchill 27'; S. Hunter 38'; R. Cameron 64' (o.g.); R. Livingstone 71'; K. Morrison 81'; E. Adams 89'	Stadium: Meadowbank Stadium

15 October 2025	Partick Thistle	7–0	Livingston
13:00	R. Donaldson 9' (pen.), 33'; L. Tweedie 43', 51', 65'; J. Love 55'; M. English 85'	Report

15 October 2025	Rangers	12–0	St Johnstone
13:00	S.J. Kim 1', 44'; M. McAulay 4', 19'; L. Berry 5', 15', 29', 49', 77'; J. McLeary 43'; M. Cruft 68', 73', 89' (pen.); K. Wilkinson 74'	Report

== Quarter-finals ==
9 November 2025	Rangers	3–0	Partick Thistle
16:00	L. Berry 17'; K. Wilkinson 26'; E. Austin 39'	Report

9 November 2025	Heart of Midlothian	2–3	Hibernian
15:00	G. Timms 13'; B. Hutchison 89'	Report	K. McGovern 25'; T. Bowie 40'; E. Adams 50'

9 November 2025	Glasgow City	2–0	Aberdeen
13:00	N. Kozlova 70'; K. Lockwood 75'	Report

9 November 2025	Celtic	9–1	Queen's Park	Hamilton
19:45	M. McAneny 22', 65'; S. Noonan 31' (pen.), 43'; M. Nakao 33'; M. Cross 39', 45'; E. Lawton 45+2', 49'	Report	A. Chomczuk 71'	Stadium: New Douglas Park

== Semi-finals ==
31 January 2026	Hibernian	1–2	Glasgow City	Edinburgh
17:15	K. Reilly 62'	Report	M. Kozlova 45+2'; C. Warrington 58'	Stadium: Meadowbank Stadium

1 February 2026	Rangers	3–3 (a.e.t.) (4–2 p)	Celtic	Glasgow
13:40	M. McAneny 16'; E. Lawton 25'; P. Pritchard 37' (pen.)	Report	K. Wilkinson 23' (pen.); L. Berry 45', 90+1'	Stadium: Ibrox Stadium

== Final ==
The final, played at Fir Park in Motherwell on 29 March 2026, was played between Glasgow City (six-time winners in previous years but most recently in 2015, with three final defeats since), and Rangers (the holders, whose first final in 2022–23 resulted in victory, with the trophy retained in 2023–24 and 2024–25). The two teams had never met in the SWPL Cup final, but had contested the Scottish Cup final in 2008–09, won by Glasgow City, and 2024–25, won by Rangers. At the time of the match, both were still in contention for the season's SWPL championship (though ultimately this would be won by Hearts); they had met three times in league fixtures, with a 1–0 win for City, a draw and a 1–0 win for Rangers a week before the cup final. In the semi-finals, Glasgow City defeated reigning league champions Hibernian while Rangers overcame rivals Celtic via a penalty shootout after a thrilling 3–3 draw.

Glasgow City claimed the trophy with a 2–1 win, both of their goals scored by Lisa Forrest in the space of two minutes midway through the second half, with Rangers unable to find a reply until Katie Wilkinson found the net in the last minute of normal time.

29 March 2026
15.00

Glasgow City	2–1	Rangers
Forrest 70', 72'	Report	Wilkinson 89'

Fir Park, Motherwell
Referee: Lorraine Watson

Glasgow City	Rangers

GK	29	(Scotland) Lee Gibson
DF	3	(Scotland) Amy Muir (c)
DF	18	(Netherlands) Kimberley Smit
DF	5	(Slovenia) Lana Golob
DF	17	(Scotland) Lisa Evans
MF	4	(Scotland) Hayley Lauder	(substituted off) 82'
MF	20	(South Africa) Linda Motlhalo
FW	11	(Republic of Ireland) Emily Whelan
MF	10	(Poland) Natalia Wróbel	(substituted off) 82'
MF	21	(Finland) Sofia Määttä
FW	7	(Scotland) Lisa Forrest
Substitutes:
GK	25	(United States) Erin Clachers
MF	14	(Scotland) Amy Anderson	(substituted on) 82'
MF	15	(England) Maddy Earl
MF	23	(United States) Emily Gray	(substituted on) 82'
FW	9	(Scotland) Abi Harrison
MF	22	(Japan) Mebae Tanaka
DF	16	(England) Codie Thomas
DF	2	(Scotland) Chloe Warrington
Manager:
(Scotland) Leanne Ross

GK	1	(Scotland) Jenna Fife
DF	2	(Scotland) Nicola Docherty (c)
DF	3	(Scotland) Leah Eddie
DF	6	(Northern Ireland) Laura Rafferty	(substituted off) 85'
MF	26	(Scotland) Jodi McLeary	(substituted off) 75'
MF	24	(Greece) Calliste Brookshire
MF	48	(South Korea) Kim Shin-ji
MF	21	(England) May Cruft
FW	14	(Scotland) Mia McAulay	(substituted off) 75'
MF	20	(United States) Camille Lafaix	(substituted off) 71'
FW	44	(England) Katie Wilkinson
Substitutes:
GK	30	(Wales) Soffia Kelly
DF	13	(China) Li Mengwen
MF	7	(Scotland) Brogan Hay	(substituted on) 75'
FW	18	(Scotland) Laura Berry	(substituted on) 71'
DF	16	(Scotland) Eilidh Austin	(substituted on) 75'
DF	5	(England) Jessica Pegram
MF	10	(Suriname) Quinty Sabajo	(substituted on) 85'
DF	29	(Scotland) Fallon Connolly-Jackson
Manager:
(Scotland) Leanne Crichton
