= 2024–25 Women's Scottish Cup =

2024–25 Scottish Women's Cup
Tournament details
- Country: Scotland
- Dates: 18 August 2024 – 25 May 2025

Final positions
- Champions: Rangers
- Runners-up: Glasgow City

The 2024–25 Women's Scottish Cup was the 52nd official edition (54th overall) of the national cup competition in Scottish women's football. For sponsorship reasons, this edition was officially known as the Scottish Gas Women's Scottish Cup.

Rangers were the defending champions, and successfully retained the trophy with a 3–0 victory over Glasgow City at Hampden Park.

== Results ==
All results listed are published by the Scottish Football Association (SFA).

=== First preliminary round ===
18 August 2024	Glenrothes Strollers	14–0	Dalbeattie Star	Glenrothes
13:00				Stadium: Overstenton Park

18 August 2024	Bayside	3–1	Stewarton Annick	Dunfermline
14:30				Stadium: Pitreavie Sport & Soccer Centre

18 August 2024	Arbroath	5–2	Annan Athletic	Arbroath
13:30				Stadium: Ogilvy Park

18 August 2024	Blairgowrie	11–2	Buchan Ladies United	Blairgowrie
13:30				Stadium: Davie Park

18 August 2024	Gretna	0–12	Bishopton	Gretna
15:15				Stadium: Raydale Park

18 August 2024	Dunfermline Athletic	9–1	Aberdeen City	Dunfermline
12:00				Stadium: Pitreavie Sport & Soccer Centre

18 August 2024	West Park United	1–5	Cumbernauld United	Paisley
14:15				Stadium: Huntershill Sports Centre

=== Second preliminary round ===
8 September 2024	Penicuik Athletic	7–1	Danderhall Miners	Penicuik
14:00				Stadium: Montgomery Park

8 September 2024	Cumbernauld Colts	4–2	McDermid Ladies	Cumbernauld
14:00				Stadium: Broadwood Stadium

8 September 2024	Bayside	0–4	Dunfermline Athletic	Dunfermline
14:15				Stadium: Pitreavie Sport & Soccer Centre

8 September 2024	Glenrothes Strollers	9–1	Grampian	Glenrothes
13:00				Stadium: Overstenton Park

8 September 2024	Blairgowrie	0–14	Linlithgow Rose CFC	Coupar Angus
14:00				Stadium: Foxhall Park

8 September 2024	Ardrossan Winton Rovers	0–4	Arbroath	Kilwinning
13:30				Stadium: Kilwinning Sports Centre

8 September 2024	Ross County	3–2	Edinburgh South CFC	Dingwall
13:00				Stadium: Highland Football Academy

8 September 2024	Elgin City	7–2	St Anthony's	Elgin
15:00				Stadium: Borough Briggs

8 September 2024	Drumchapel United	4–3	Cumbernauld United	Drumchapel
13:00				Stadium: Donald Dewar Sports Centre

8 September 2024	Cambusdoon	3–1	Buckie	Ayr
14:00				Stadium: Cambusdoon Sports Centre

15 September 2024	Murieston United Women	1–4	Alloa Athletic	Murieston
14:00				Stadium: Bankton Mains Sports Complex

22 September 2024	Bishopton	2–5	Huntly	Erskine
14:00				Stadium: Park Mains High School

=== First Round ===
10 clubs from SWF League One enter at this stage.

6 October 2024	St Mirren	4–0 (Note: St Mirren were ejected from the competition due to using an ineligible player, with Ross County reinstated.)	Ross County	Erskine
14:45				Stadium: Mossedge Village

6 October 2024	Dunipace	7–0	Penicuik Athletic	Denny
12:00				Stadium: Westfield Park

6 October 2024	Dunfermline Athletic	3–0	Kilwinning FA	Dunfermline
13:30				Stadium: Pitreavie Sport & Soccer Centre

6 October 2024	Edinburgh Caledonia	4–1	Huntly	Prestonfield
12:45				Stadium: East Peffermill

6 October 2024	Inverurie Loco Works	1–0	Arbroath	Inverurie
13:00				Stadium: Harlaw Park

6 October 2024	Cambusdoon	6–4	Alloa Athletic	Ayr
15:00				Stadium: Cambusdoon Sports Centre

6 October 2024	Giffnock SC	2–0	Stonehaven	Giffnock
13:00				Stadium: Eastwood Park

6 October 2024	Queen of the South	5–0	Dundee West	Dumfries
14:00				Stadium: Palmerston Park

6 October 2024	Linlithgow Rose CFC	4–6	Elgin City	Linlithgow
14:00				Stadium: Xcite Leisue Centre

6 October 2024	Drumchapel United	4–0	Cumbernauld Colts	Drumchapel
13:00				Stadium: Donald Dewar Sports Centre

6 October 2024	Glenrothes Strollers	12–0	Dyce	Glenrothes
13:00				Stadium: Overstenton Park

6 October 2024	Bonnyrigg Rose	3–1	Armadale Thistle	Bonnyrigg
13:30				Stadium: Poltonhall Sports Centre

=== Second Round ===
12 clubs from the SWF Championship enter at this stage.

3 November 2024	Morton	4–0	Cambusdoon	Port Glasgow
14:00				Stadium: Parklea Stadium

3 November 2024	Glasgow Women	4–1	Queen of the South	Motherwell
15:00				Stadium: Alliance Park

3 November 2024	Elgin City	4–3	Dunipace	Elgin
15:00				Stadium: Borough Briggs

3 November 2024	Forfar Farmington	1–4	East Fife	Forfar
12:00				Stadium: Station Park

3 November 2024	Ross County	2–3	Bonnyrigg Rose	Dingwall
13:00				Stadium: Global Energy Stadium

3 November 2024	Falkirk FCF	5–1	Drumchapel United	Falkirk
14:00				Stadium: Falkirk Stadium

3 November 2024	Westdyke	10–0	Hutchison Vale	Westhill
15:00				Stadium: Lawsondale Playing Fields

3 November 2024	Edinburgh Caledonia	1–5	Dryburgh Athletic	Edinburgh
16:00				Stadium: Meadowbank Stadium

3 November 2024	Renfrew	3–2	Stenhousemuir	Renfrew
14:00				Stadium: New Western Park

3 November 2024	Inverness Caledonian Thistle	1–0	Inverurie Loco Works	Inverness
12:30				Stadium: Millburn Academy

3 November 2024	Glenrothes Strollers	1–0	Giffnock SC	Glenrothes
13:30				Stadium: Michael Woods Sports and Leisure Centre

3 November 2024	Dunfermline Athletic	0–2	Stirling University	Dunfermline
13:30				Stadium: Pitreavie Sport & Soccer Centre

=== Third Round ===
12 clubs from the Scottish Women's Premier League and 8 clubs from SWPL 2 enter at this stage.

8 December 2024	Aberdeen	3–1	Gartcairn	Cove Bay
13:00				Stadium: Balmoral Stadium

8 December 2024	East Fife	0–3	Montrose	Methil
12:30				Stadium: Bayview Stadium

8 December 2024	Elgin City	1–0	Dryburgh Athletic	Elgin
16:00				Stadium: Borough Briggs

8 December 2024	Falkirk FCF	2–0	Renfrew	Falkirk
14:00				Stadium: Falkirk Community Patches

8 December 2024	Glasgow Women	0–13	Celtic	Coatbridge
14:00				Stadium: Cliftonhill

8 December 2024	Morton	1–2	Bonnyrigg Rose	Port Glasgow
13:00				Stadium: Parklea Stadium

8 December 2024	Heart of Midlothian	1–0	Hibernian	Riccarton
14:00				Stadium: Oriam

8 December 2024	Inverness Caledonian Thistle	0–1	Dundee United	Inverness
12:30				Stadium: Millburn Academy

8 December 2024	Livingston	0–5	Boroughmuir Thistle	Livingston
13:30				Stadium: Almondvale Stadium

8 December 2024	Partick Thistle	1–3	Glasgow City	Springburn
13:00				Stadium: Petershill Park

8 December 2024	Queen's Park	1–3	Hamilton Academical	Stenhousemuir
14:00				Stadium: Ochilview Park

8 December 2024	Rossvale	0–7	Motherwell	Kirkintilloch
15:00				Stadium: Kirkintilloch Community Sports Complex

8 December 2024	Spartans	3–0	Glenrothes Strollers	Pilton
13:00				Stadium: Ainslie Park

8 December 2024	St Johnstone	4–0	Ayr United	Perth
13:00				Stadium: Riverside Stadium

8 December 2024	Stirling University	1–2	Kilmarnock	Stirling
14:00				Stadium: University Sports Grounds

8 December 2024	Westdyke	1–24	Rangers	Westhill
15:00				Stadium: Lawsondale Playing Fields

=== Fourth Round ===
2 February 2025	Aberdeen	3–0	Hamilton Academical	Cove Bay
13:00				Stadium: Balmoral Stadium

2 February 2025	Dundee United	1–3	Boroughmuir Thistle	Dundee
14:00				Stadium: Foundation Park

2 February 2025	Falkirk FCF	0–9	Heart of Midlothian	Falkirk
14:00				Stadium: Falkirk Stadium

2 February 2025	Glasgow City	3–2	Celtic	Springburn
13:00				Stadium: Petershill Park

2 February 2025	Motherwell	6–0	Bonnyrigg Rose	East Kilbride
16:00				Stadium: K-Park Football Academy

2 February 2025	Rangers	7–0	Montrose	Cumbernauld
14:00				Stadium: Broadwood Stadium

2 February 2025	Spartans	6–0	Kilmarnock	Pilton
13:00				Stadium: Ainslie Park

2 February 2025	St Johnstone	4–2	Elgin City	Perth
13:00				Stadium: Riverside Stadium

=== Quarter-finals ===
9 March 2025	Rangers	2–0	Spartans	Cumbernauld
14:00				Stadium: Broadwood Stadium

9 March 2025	Boroughmuir Thistle	0–3	Motherwell	Edinburgh
12:00				Stadium: Meadowbank Stadium

9 March 2025	Heart of Midlothian	2–3	Glasgow City	Riccarton
13:00				Stadium: Oriam

9 March 2025	St Johnstone	1–4	Aberdeen	Perth
13:00				Stadium: Riverside Stadium

=== Semi-finals ===
26 April 2025	Glasgow City	4–0	Motherwell	Glasgow
12:15	Määttä 33'; Kozlova 45'; Lockwood 57', 78'			Stadium: Hampden Park

27 April 2025	Rangers	5–0	Aberdeen	Glasgow
12:15	Ross 8', 52', 84'; Hardy 43'; Arnot 87'			Stadium: Hampden Park

== Final ==
Rangers entered the tournament as Scottish Cup holders and reached their third consecutive final; they lost to Celtic in 2023 before overcoming Heart of Midlothian in 2024. It was a 15th appearance in the final for opponents Glasgow City, with nine wins (the record for the competition) and five defeats.

The two clubs had met once before in a Scottish Cup final, in 2009 – City (already established as one of the leading teams in the country) proved far too strong for second-tier Rangers who were in their first season of competition.

The finalists had suffered disappointment in the lead-up to the match as both were in contention for the 2024–25 Scottish Women's Premier League on the final matchday, but the title went to Hibernian.

=== Details ===
25 May 2025
14:00

Glasgow City	0–3	Rangers
		McAulay 25'; Howat 38', 50'

Hampden Park, Glasgow
Referee: Dan McFarlane

Glasgow City	Rangers

GK	29	(Scotland) Lee Gibson
DF	3	(Scotland) Amy Muir	(substituted off) 62'
DF	5	(Republic of Ireland) Claire Walsh
DF	18	(Netherlands) Kimberley Smit
DF	22	(Scotland) Samantha van Diemen	(red card) 79'
MF	4	(Scotland) Hayley Lauder (c)
MF	15	(United States) Aleigh Gambone	(substituted off) 74'
MF	10	(Poland) Natalia Wróbel	(substituted off) 62'
MF	21	(Finland) Sofia Määttä	(substituted off) 45'
FW	9	(United States) Brenna Lovera	(substituted off) 74'
FW	19	(Ukraine) Nicole Kozlova
Substitutes:
GK	35	(Scotland) Ava Easdon
DF	2	(Scotland) Chloe Warrington
MF	6	(Scotland) Jo Love
MF	8	(England) Katie Lockwood	(substituted on) 62'
FW	11	(Republic of Ireland) Emily Whelan	(substituted on) 45'
DF	17	(Scotland) Lisa Evans	(substituted on) 62'
MF	20	(South Africa) Linda Motlhalo	(substituted on) 74'
FW	24	(Scotland) Lisa Forrest	(substituted on) 74'
Manager:
(Scotland) Leanne Ross

GK	1	(Scotland) Jenna Fife
DF	2	(Scotland) Nicola Docherty (c)	(substituted off) 26'
DF	4	(Scotland) Kathryn Hill	(substituted off) 81'
DF	6	(Netherlands) Tessel Middag
DF	26	(Scotland) Jodi McLeary
MF	7	(Scotland) Brogan Hay
MF	19	(Scotland) Chelsea Cornet
MF	23	(Scotland) Kirsty Maclean
MF	14	(Scotland) Mia McAulay	(substituted off) 74'
FW	9	(Scotland) Kirsty Howat	(substituted off) 81'
FW	44	(England) Katie Wilkinson	(substituted off) 74'
Substitutes:
GK	22	(New Zealand) Victoria Esson
DF	3	(Scotland) Leah Eddie	(substituted on) 81'
DF	5	(Northern Ireland) Laura Rafferty	(substituted on) 26'
FW	10	(England) Rio Hardy	(substituted on) 74'
FW	13	(Scotland) Jane Ross	(substituted on) 81'
FW	15	(Scotland) Lizzie Arnot
MF	20	(United States) Camille Lafaix	(substituted on) 74'
Manager:
(England) Jo Potter

Player of the Match:
Kirsty Howat

Assistant referees:
Brian Christie
Vikki Allan
Fourth official
Abbie Hendry
Video Assistant Referees
Calum Scott
Alan Mulvanny

Match rules

- 90 minutes
- 30 minutes of extra time if necessary
- Penalty shoot-out if scores still level
- Seven named substitutes
- Maximum of five substitutions in normal time
