= 2024 Scottish Women's Premier League Cup final =

2024 Scottish football match

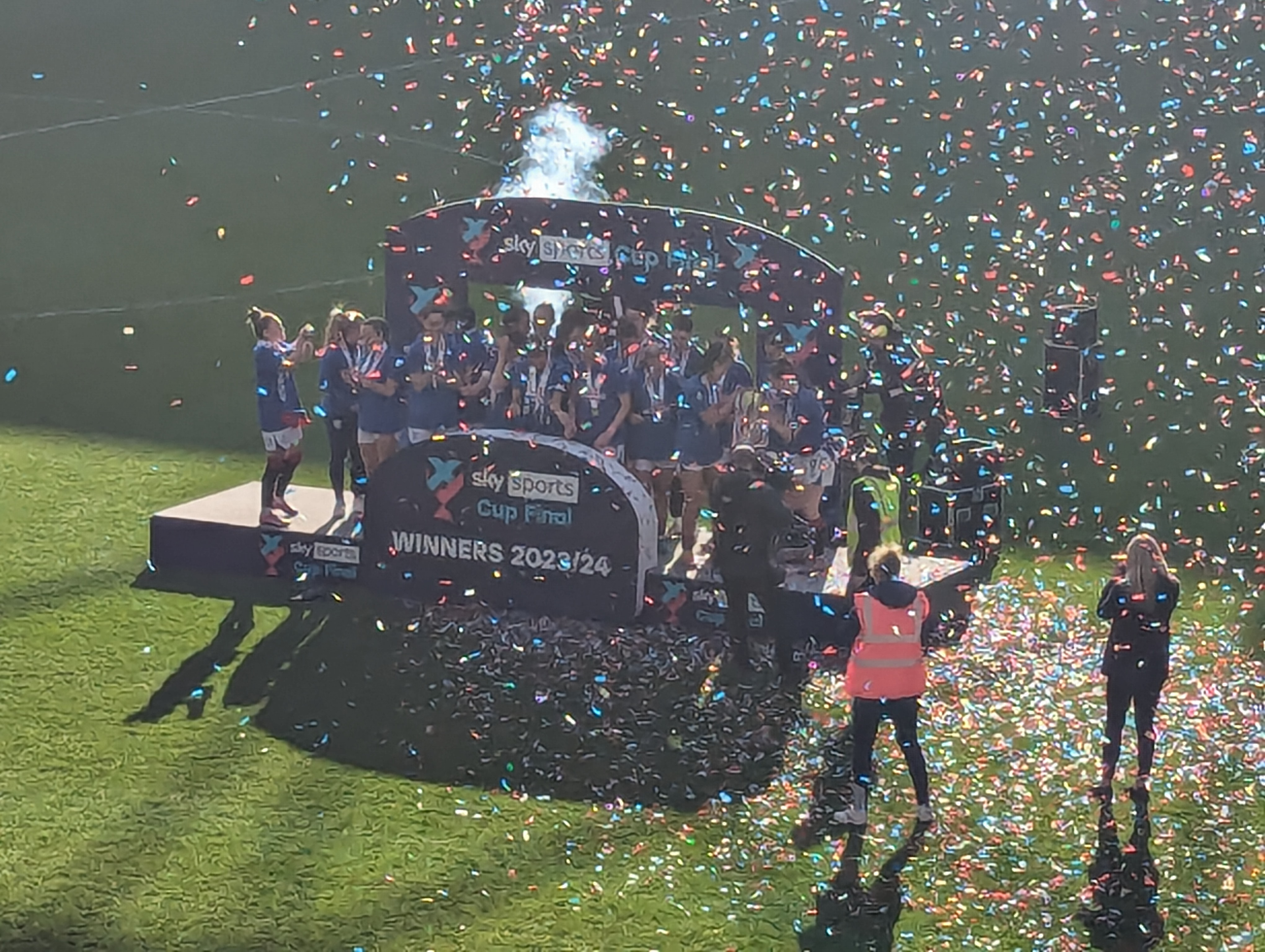
- Rangers players celebrating their win
- Event: 2023–24 Scottish Women's Premier League Cup
Rangers	Partick Thistle
4	1
- Date: 24 March 2024
- Venue: Tynecastle Park, Edinburgh
- Referee: Duncan Nicolson
- Attendance: 4,786

The 2024 Scottish Women's Premier League Cup final, marketed with the sponsored title, 2024 Sky Sports Cup Final, was the 21st final of the Scottish Women's Premier League Cup. The match was played on 24 March 2024 at Tynecastle Park, Edinburgh. Rangers and Partick Thistle were the finalists; the match was televised live in the United Kingdom on Sky Sports and Sky Sports Mix channels. Rangers won the trophy for the second time.

The competition had previously been held in the first half of the season (usually the final was in May under a summer calendar in the 2010s, and then in December under a winter-spring calendar in 2021–22 and 2022–23) but from this edition was scheduled over a longer period ending in March, with no final played in 2023.

== Route to the final ==
=== Rangers ===
Rangers entered the competition in the second round and were drawn away from home in Edinburgh against Heart of Midlothian where they ran out 1–4 winners. In the Quarter-final at home Rangers dominated Boroughmuir Thistle with a 7–0 victory. In the Semi-final they defeated Celtic 2–3 at the Excelsior Stadium

Rangers route to the final
Round	Opposition	Score
2R	Heart of Midlothian (A)	1–4
QF	Boroughmuir Thistle (H)	7–0
SF	Celtic (A)	2–3
Key: (H) = Home venue; (A) = Away venue; (N) = Neutral venue

=== Partick Thistle ===
Partick Thistle reached the final after three successive home wins. In the 2nd round they defeated Spartans 2–0, In the Quarter Finals they faced Montrose winning 2-1 and in the Semi Final they defeated Hibernian 2-0

Round	Opposition	Score
2R	Spartans (H)	2–0
QF	Montrose(H)	2–1
SF	Hibernian (H)	2–0
Key: (H) = Home venue; (A) = Away venue; (N) = Neutral venue

== Pre-match ==
Rangers were the reigning champions of the competition, with their 2022 victory the first time they had lifted the trophy (in their first appearance at that stage). Conversely, it marked a historic moment for Partick Thistle as they made their inaugural appearance in a major final.

== Match ==
=== Details ===
24 March 2024
13:30

Rangers	4–1	Partick Thistle
McAulay 13'; Rowe 35'; Hardy 47'; McLoughlin 53'		Donaldson 18'

Tynecastle Park, Edinburgh
Attendance: 4,786
Referee: Duncan Nicolson

Rangers	Partick Thistle

GK	22	(New Zealand) Victoria Esson
DF	2	(Scotland) Nicola Docherty (c)
DF	6	(Netherlands) Tessel Middag
DF	4	(Scotland) Kathryn Hill	(substituted off) 78'
FW	7	(Scotland) Brogan Hay
MF	19	(Scotland) Chelsea Cornet	(substituted off) 78'
MF	24	(England) Olivia McLoughlin
MF	14	(Scotland) Mia McAulay	(substituted off) 61'
MF	8	(Wales) Rachel Rowe
FW	13	(Scotland) Jane Ross	(substituted off) 61'
FW	10	(England) Rio Hardy	(substituted off) 61'
Substitutes:
MF	15	(Scotland) Lizzie Arnot		(substituted on) 61'
DF	16	(Scotland) Eilidh Austin		(substituted on) 78'
MF	12	(England) Libby Bance		(substituted on) 78'
MF	17	(Scotland) Sarah Ewens		(substituted on) 61'
GK	22	(Scotland) Jenna Fife
FW	9	(Scotland) Kirsty Howat		(substituted on) 61'
DF	21	(France) Lisa Martinez
FW	26	(Scotland) Jodi McLeary
Manager:
(England) Jo Potter

GK	1	(Scotland) Ava Easdon
DF	8	(Scotland) Clare Docherty
DF	2	(Scotland) Rosie Slater
DF	5	(Scotland) Demi Falconer (c)
DF	3	(Scotland) Emma Lawton
MF	30	(Scotland) Lucy Sinclair	(substituted off) 60'
MF	14	(Scotland) Amy Bulloch	(substituted off) 60'
MF	12	(Scotland) Rachel Donaldson	(substituted off) 82'
MF	15	(Scotland) Linzi Taylor
FW	9	(Scotland) Cara Henderson	(substituted off) 71'
FW	27	(England) Imogen Longcake	(substituted off) 60'
Substitutes:
MF	10	(Scotland) Claire Adams		(substituted on) 60'
FW	7	(Scotland) Kodie Hay		(substituted on) 60'
MF	11	(Scotland) Rebecca McAllister		(substituted on) 60'
DF	4	(Scotland) Cheryl McCulloch
FW	22	(Scotland) Rosie McQuillan		(substituted on) 71'
DF	21	(Scotland) Leah Robinson
GK	26	(Scotland) Chloe Logan
FW	16	(Scotland) Rachel Wright		(substituted on) 82'
Manager:
(Scotland) Brian Graham

Player of the Match:
Mia McAulay

Assistant referees:
Chris Gentles
Lauren Whitehead
Fourth official
Joel Kennedy

Match rules

- 90 minutes
- 30 minutes of extra time if necessary
- Penalty shoot-out if scores still level
- Seven named substitutes
- Maximum of six substitutions in normal time
