= 2022 Scottish Women's Premier League Cup final =

2022 football match

- Event: 2022–23 Scottish Women's Premier League Cup
Rangers	Hibernian
2	0
- Date: 11 December 2022
- Venue: Tynecastle Park, Edinburgh
- Referee: Colin Whyte
- Attendance: 3,747

The 2022 Scottish Women's Premier League Cup final was the 20th final of the Scottish Women's Premier League Cup. The match was played on 11 December 2022 at Tynecastle Park, Edinburgh. Rangers and Hibernian were the finalists; the match was televised live in the United Kingdom on Sky Sports and Sky Sports Mix channels. Rangers won the trophy for the first time.

== Route to the final ==
=== Rangers ===
Rangers' route to the final
Round	Opposition	Score
2R	Queen's Park (A)	5–0
QF	Motherwell (H)	6–0
SF	Spartans (A)	4–0
Key: (H) = Home venue; (A) = Away venue; (N) = Neutral venue

Rangers entered the tournament in the second round, defeating Queen's Park 5–0 away from home at New Tinto Park. In the quarter-final they faced Motherwell at home and won 5–0. They faced Spartans away from home in Edinburgh and won the game 4–0.

=== Hibernian ===
Round	Opposition	Score
2R	Hamilton Accies (A)	8–0
QF	Kilmarnock(A)	2–1
SF	Glasgow City (A)	2–1
Key: (H) = Home venue; (A) = Away venue; (N) = Neutral venue

Hibernian reached the final after successive 8–0 away wins against Hamilton Accies at New Douglas Park and Kilmarnock at Rugby Park. They defeated Glasgow City 2–1 at Petershill Park in the semi-final.

== Pre-match ==
Going into the 2022 final, Hibernian had won the competition seven times and been runners-up four times. Rangers had never reached the final.

== Match ==
=== Details ===
11 December 2022
12.30

Rangers	2–0	Hibernian
Arnot 16'; Howat 76'

Tynecastle Park, Edinburgh
Attendance: 3,747
Referee: Colin Whyte

Rangers	Hibernian

GK	1	(Scotland) Jenna Fife
DF	2	(Scotland) Nicola Docherty
DF	5	(United States) Hannah Davison	(substituted off) 76'
DF	4	(Scotland) Kathryn Hill	(substituted off) 90' (c)
DF	12	(Scotland) Rachel McLauchlan
MF	18	(Scotland) Chelsea Cornet
MF	6	(Netherlands) Tessel Middag	(substituted off) 90'
FW	15	(Scotland) Lizzie Arnot
MF	20	(Finland) Jenny Danielsson	(substituted off) 10'
FW	7	(Scotland) Brogan Hay	(substituted off) 83'
FW	10	(Jamaica) Kayla McCoy	(substituted off) 70'
Substitutes:
MF	9	(Scotland) Kirsty Howat		(substituted on) 70'
DF	11	(Northern Ireland) Megan Bell
MF	14	(Scotland) Colette Cavanagh		(substituted on) 83'
MF	21	(France) Lisa Martinez		(substituted on) 90'
GK	22	(New Zealand) Victoria Esson
MF	23	(Scotland) Kirsty Maclean		(substituted on) 90'
DF	24	(Scotland) Sam Kerr		(substituted on) 10'
FW	26	(Scotland) Jodi McLeary
MF	28	(Scotland) Emma Watson		(substituted on) 83'
Manager:
(Scotland) Malky Thomson

GK	13	(Norway) Benedicte Håland
MF	4	(Scotland) Leah Eddie
DF	5	(Scotland) Joelle Murray (c)
MF	4	(Scotland) Siobhan Hunter
DF	3	(England) Lucy Parry
FW	18	(Scotland) Rosie Livingstone	(substituted off) 56'
DF	16	(Scotland) Ellis Notley
MF	10	(Scotland) Shannon McGregor
MF	8	(Scotland) Michaela McAlonie
FW	9	(Scotland) Eilidh Adams
FW	21	(Cyprus) Krystyna Freda	(substituted off) 56'
Substitutes:
DF	2	(Scotland) Shannon Leishman
MF	7	(Trinidad and Tobago) Liana Hinds		(substituted on) 56'
FW	11	(Syria) Nor Mustafa		(substituted on) 56'
GK	12	(Poland) Daniela Kosińska
DF	24	(England) Ava Kuyken
MF	27	(Cyprus) Eleni Giannou
FW	29	(Scotland) Kirsty Morrison
DF	33	(England) Poppy Lawson
Manager:
(Scotland) Dean Gibson

Player of the Match:
Lizzie Arnot

Assistant referees:
Alaistair Taylor
James McClusky
Fourth official
Steven MacDonald

Match rules

- 90 minutes
- 30 minutes of extra time if necessary
- Penalty shoot-out if scores still level
- Seven named substitutes
- Maximum of six substitutions in normal time
