= Charlotte Newsham =

Scottish footballer (born 2000)

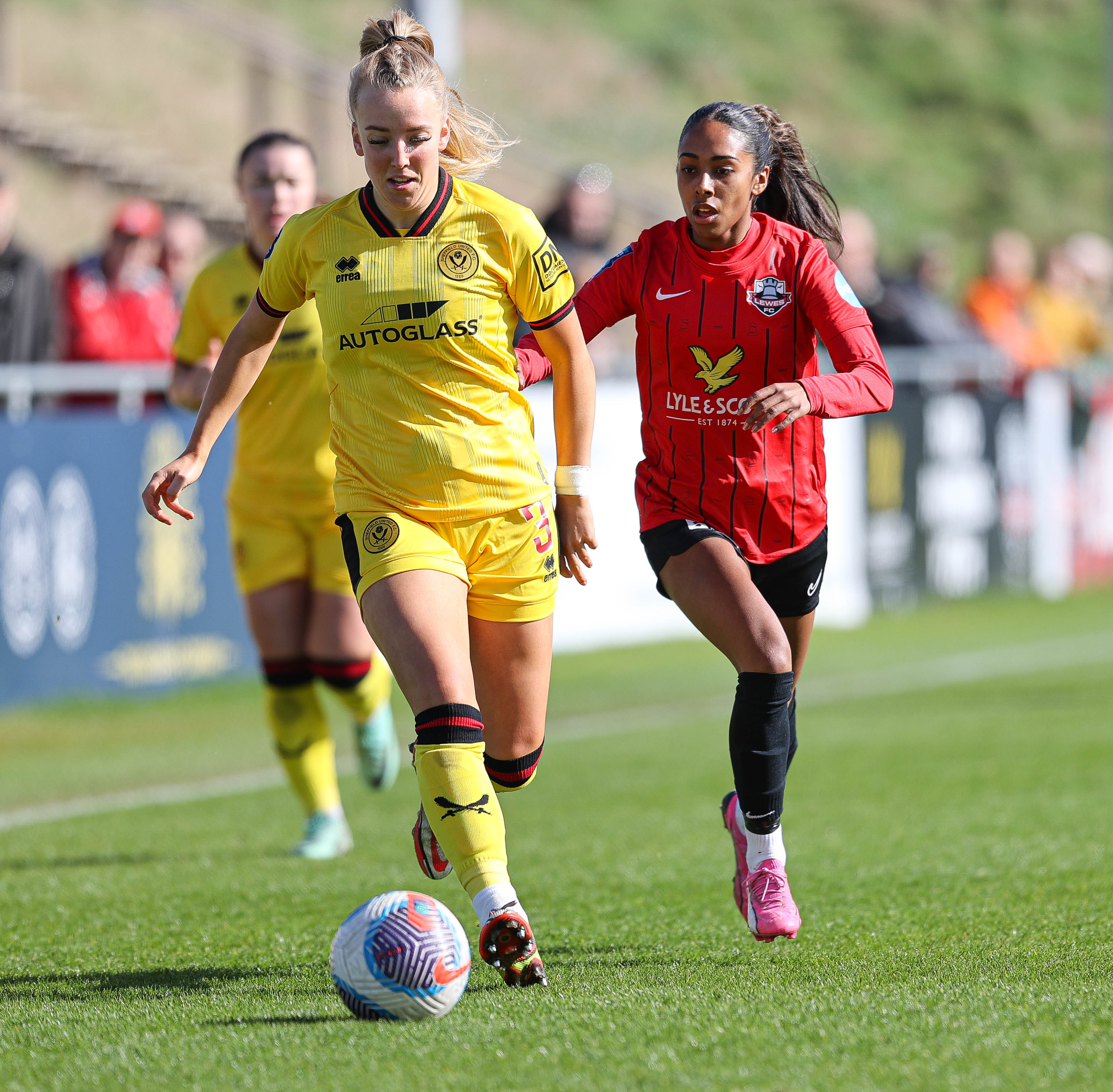
- Newsham (Yellow) with Sheffield United W.F.C. in 2024.

Personal information
- Full name: Charlotte Lucy Newsham
- Date of birth: 14 May 2000 (age 26)
- Place of birth: England
- Height: 1.70 m (5 ft 7 in)
- Position: Defender

Team information
- Current team: Charlton Athletic W.F.C.
- Number: 3

Youth career
- 2017-18: Manchester City

Senior career*
Years	Team	Apps	(Gls)
2019-2020	Manchester United		
2019-2020	→ Huddersfield Town (loan)	13	(2)
2020-2021	Blackburn Rovers	16	(1)
2021-2024	Sheffield United	69	(3)
2024-	Charlton Athletic	47	(4)

International career^{‡}
2017-2019	Scotland U19	6	(0)
2023	Scotland U23	1	(0)
2025-	Scotland	2	(0)
- * Club domestic league appearances and goals as of 14:35, 31 March 2026 (UTC+1) ‡ National team caps and goals as of 13:20 12 March 2026 (UTC)

Charlotte Lucy Newsham (born 14 May 2000) is a Scottish professional footballer who plays left back for English Women's Super League club Charlton Athletic and the Scotland national team.

She has previously made appearances for 4 clubs in the English Pyramid: playing for Huddersfield Town in the National League Northern Premier Division, and Blackburn Rovers and Sheffield United in the FA WSL2 (previously the FA Women's Championship).

Newsham made her international debut for Scotland at the 2018 UEFA Women's Under-19 Championship qualification on 24 October 2017 against Turkey, resulting in a 0–0 draw. She was called up for the first team in 2026 for the 2027 World Cup Qualifiers.

== Club career ==
She started her career at the Manchester City's development team before being picked up by Manchester United. She was sent on loan to National League Northern Premier Division side Huddersfield Town for the 2019–20 season, until the season was halted due to the COVID-19 pandemic. In 2020, she joined the FA Women's Championship with Blackburn Rovers. That season was also halted due to the COVID-19 pandemic. After a 9th-place finish, she made the decision to join Sheffield United, another championship team that had finished 4th that season.

Newsham was with Sheffield United for three seasons, racking up 56 caps with them in the championship, and 13 caps in trophy competitions. After the 2022–23 season, where United finished 8th, Newsham won the club's Player of the Year award. On 10 July 2024, Newsham announced she was leaving the club on her personal Twitter account. Seven days later, it was announced that she had signed for Charlton Athletic.

Newsham became a core member of the Charlton Athletic squad. She played 18 out of 20 of the games for the 2024–25 Women's Championship season, starting in 17 of them. The team finished 3rd in the season with the team achieving the biggest away win, winning the highest scoring game, achieving the longest winning run, and the longest unbeaten run (alongside the league champions London City Lionesses). After the season, she won the Charlton PFA Community Champion for her work in the local community and with the Charlton Athletic Community Trust. On 24 November 2025, it was announced that she was nominated for the Barclays WSL 2 Player of the Month

== International career ==
Newsham was first called up for international duty as a youth player in the Scotland squad for the 2018 UEFA Women's Under-19 Championship qualification. She was on the team sheet for all three of the initial qualifiers, but only played in the third game against Turkey. They drew 0–0 and proceeded onto the elite qualification stages, where Scotland was placed in group 7. Newsham was benched for the 2–1 loss against the Czech Republic but proceeded to start against Italy and have her first full 90 minute international game against Russia, where they drew 0–0.

Newsham was again called up for the U19 squad in the 2019 edition of the tournament. This was hosted in Scotland and as a result Scotland automatically qualified to the group stages. They were in group A with Norway, Netherlands, and the eventual champions France. Newsham started in all three games and played the full 90 minutes against Norway and the Netherlands.

She was selected for one Scotland women's national under-23 football team game against the Netherlands in a friendly. The game ended 3–1 to the Netherlands, with Newsham being one of four players to play the full 90 minutes, alongside Leah Eddie, Amy Muir, and Chelsea Cornet.

In 2025, after Amy Rodgers suffered a broken jaw in a Nations League game against Austria, Newsham was called up to the first team for the first time in her senior career. On 10 February 2026, it was announced that Newsham would be joining Melissa Andreatta's Scotland squad for the 2027 World Cup Qualifier against Luxembourg in March.
