= 2020–21 Celtic F.C. Women season =

Football season for Celtic F.C. Women

Celtic F.C.
2020–21 season
- Manager: Fran Alonso
- Stadium: K-Park Training Academy, East Kilbride
- SWPL 1: 2nd
- Scottish Cup: Not contested
- SWPL Cup: Not contested
- Top goalscorer: League: Sarah Ewens (16 goals); All: Sarah Ewens (16 goals)
Home colours	Away colours	Third colours

The 2020–21 season was Celtic Women's 14th season of competitive football. This was the first season where the league reverted to a winter-season format since 2008–09. The League Cup and Scottish Cup were not contested due to the COVID-19 pandemic.

== Scottish Women's Premier League ==
Celtic played Glasgow City at Broadwood Stadium in the opening game. The league season was forced to stop between January 2021 to March 2021 again due to lock down from the COVID-19 pandemic. The season concluded with Celtic finishing 2nd, just 3 points behind the winners.

18 October 2020	Glasgow City	2-0	Celtic	Cumbernauld
16:10 BST	McLauchlan 63'; Howat 68'	Report		Stadium: Broadwood Stadium

1 November 2020	Hearts	0-10	Celtic	Edinburgh
11:00 GMT		Report	Green 24'; Donaldson 29'; Bowie 45'; Craig 52' (pen.); Ross 56', 80'; Anita 65'; Ewens 74'; McGovern 76', 78'	Stadium: Oriam

8 November 2020	Celtic	1-0	Spartans	East Kilbride
14:00 GMT	Ewens 48'	Report		Stadium: K-Park Training Academy

15 November 2020	Rangers	0-1	Celtic	Milngavie
15:00 GMT		Report	Green 90+4' (pen.)	Stadium: Rangers Training Centre

22 November 2020	Hibernian	2-6	Celtic	Edinburgh
19:35 GMT	Boyle 22' (pen.); Potts 52'	Report	Bartle 13'; Anita 15', 36'; Robertson 39'; Ross 45+1'; Green 53'	Stadium: Ainslie Park

6 December 2020	Celtic	2-2	Forfar Farmington	East Kilbride
14:00 GMT	Craig 88'; Ross 90'	Report	Pollard 63'; Paterson 73'	Stadium: K-Park Training Academy

13 December 2020	Motherwell	0-5	Celtic	Airdrie
12:30 GMT		Report	Robertson 42'; Ewens 53', 81'; Donaldson 58'; Craig 70'	Stadium: Excelsior Stadium

4 April 2021	Celtic	0-3	Glasgow City	East Kilbride
16:10 GMT		Report	Colvill 21'; Ásgrímsdóttir 72'; Farrelly 77'	Stadium: K-Park Training Academy

11 April 2021	Celtic	3-0	Hearts	East Kilbride
14:00 BST	Donaldson 57'; Ewens 76', 87'	Report		Stadium: K-Park Training Academy

18 April 2021	Spartans	1-5	Celtic	Edinburgh
14:00 BST	Marshall 45+2'	Report	Ewens 1'; Harkes 26'; Filbey 53'; Craig 82', 86' (pen.)	Stadium: Ainslie Park

21 April 2021	Celtic	1-0	Rangers	Glasgow
19:35 BST	Lee 80'	Report		Stadium: Celtic Park

25 April 2021	Celtic	3-1	Hibernian	East Kilbride
16:10 BST	Nicolson 45'; Craig 53' (pen.); Ewens 58'	Report	Gallacher 24'	Stadium: K-Park Training Academy

2 May 2021	Forfar Farmington	0-8	Celtic	Forfar
14:00 BST		Report	Filbey 2'; Atkinson 36'; Ewens 37', 74'; Harkes 40'; Craig 54' (pen.); Lee 60', 90'	Stadium: Station Park, Forfar

9 May 2021	Celtic	3-0	Motherwell	East Kilbride
12:00 BST	Donaldson 17', 35'; Harkes 41'	Report		Stadium: K-Park Training Academy

12 May 2021	Celtic	0-0	Glasgow City	East Kilbride
19:40 BST		Report		Stadium: K-Park Training Academy

16 May 2021	Hearts	0-3	Celtic	Edinburgh
13:00 BST		Report	Craig 53'; Filbey 67', 89'	Stadium: Oriam

19 May 2021	Celtic	4-0	Spartans	Lennoxtown
19:00 BST	Ewens 16'; Jacynta 29'; Bartle 41'; Lee 51'	Report		Stadium: Lennoxtown training centre

23 May 2021	Rangers	1-2	Celtic	Milngavie
16:10 BST	McLauchlan 27'	Report	Clark 20'; Ewens 82'	Stadium: Rangers Training Centre

26 May 2021	Hibernian	0-1	Celtic	Penicuik
19:15 BST		Report	Hayes 43'	Stadium: Montgomery Park

30 May 2021	Celtic	10-0	Forfar Farmington	East Kilbride
14:00 BST	Ewens 4', 51', 85'; Bruce 13' (o.g.); Craig 28', 80' (pen.); Lee 33', 58'; Filbey 45', 81'	Report		Stadium: K-Park Training Academy

6 June 2021	Motherwell	0-8	Celtic	Airdrie
16:10 BST		Report	Craig 5', 30'; Ewens 9'; Filbey 20', 55'; Pollard 43'; Clark 63'; Robertson 75'	Stadium: Excelsior Stadium

== Players ==
As of 8 April 2026

Note: Flags indicate national team as defined under FIFA eligibility rules; some limited exceptions apply. Players may hold more than one non-FIFA nationality.

No.	Pos.	Nation	Player
1	GK	SCO	Chloe Logan
2	DF	IRL	Keeva Keenan
3	DF	ENG	Jodie Bartle
5	MF	SCO	Natalie Ross
6	DF	SCO	Chloe Craig
7	FW	USA	Mariah Lee
8	MF	AUS	Jacynta
10	MF	SCO	Lisa Robertson
11	FW	SCO	Sarah Ewens
12	MF	SCO	Rachel Donaldson
14	MF	USA	Sarah Harkes
15	DF	SCO	Kelly Clark (captain)
16	DF	SCO	Kate Nicolson
17	MF	IRL	Izzy Atkinson

No.	Pos.	Nation	Player
18	DF	IRL	Caitlin Hayes
20	FW	SCO	London Pollard
21	FW	WAL	Anna Filbey
22	DF	SCO	Chloe Warrington
24	MF	SCO	Tegan Bowie
25	MF	SCO	Rebecca McAllister
27	MF	SCO	Maria McAneny
28	DF	SCO	Morgan Graham
29	MF	SCO	Olivia Potter
30	FW	SCO	Tiree Burchill
31	MF	SCO	Charlotte Terry
52	GK	SCO	Rachael Johnstone
63	FW	SCO	Kathleen McGovern

=== Players who left during the season ===
Note: Flags indicate national team as defined under FIFA eligibility rules; some limited exceptions apply. Players may hold more than one non-FIFA nationality.

No.	Pos.	Nation	Player
4	MF	SCO	Cheryl McCulloch
7	FW	ESP	Anita
9	FW	GER	Josephine Giard
17	FW	USA	Summer Green
21	MF	ESP	Brenda

== Player Statistics ==
=== Appearances and Goals ===
List of player appearances, substitute appearances in brackets, goals for each competition including totals

Celtic FC Women – 2020–21 Player Statistics by Competition
Player	Position	SWPL 1		Scottish Cup		League Cup		Total Apps	Total Goals
		Apps	Goals	Apps	Goals	Apps	Goals	Apps	Goals
Chloe Logan	GK	14	0	0	0	0	0	14	0
Rachael Johnstone	GK	7	0	0	0	0	0	7	0
Jodie Bartle	DF	15(2)	1	0	0	0	0	15(2)	1
Kelly Clark	DF	15(4)	2	0	0	0	0	15(4)	2
Chloe Craig	DF	17(1)	11	0	0	0	0	17(1)	11
Caitlin Hayes	DF	16(1)	1	0	0	0	0	16(1)	1
Keeva Keenan	DF	6(3)	0	0	0	0	0	6(3)	0
Kate Nicolson	DF	7(9)	2	0	0	0	0	7(9)	2
Chloe Warrington	DF	13(1)	0	0	0	0	0	13(1)	0
Cheryl McCulloch	DF	0(2)	0	0	0	0	0	0(2)	0
Morgan Graham	DF	0(1)	0	0	0	0	0	0(1)	0
Lisa Robertson	MF	20(1)	3	0	0	0	0	20(1)	3
Natalie Ross	MF	7	4	0	0	0	0	7	4
Sarah Harkes	MF	6(2)	3	0	0	0	0	6(2)	3
Jacynta	MF	9(1)	1	0	0	0	0	9(1)	1
Izzy Atkinson	MF	5(6)	1	0	0	0	0	5(6)	1
Tegan Bowie	MF	6(11)	1	0	0	0	0	6(11)	1
Rebecca McAllister	MF	2(8)	0	0	0	0	0	2(8)	0
Rachel Donaldson	MF	14(5)	5	0	0	0	0	14(5)	5
Mariah Lee	MF	9(2)	6	0	0	0	0	9(2)	6
Brenda	MF	0(2)	0	0	0	0	0	0(2)	0
Maria McAneny	MF	0(2)	0	0	0	0	0	0(2)	0
Charlotte Terry	MF	0(1)	0	0	0	0	0	0(1)	0
Olivia Potter	MF	0(1)	0	0	0	0	0	0(1)	0
Anita	FW	3(4)	3	0	0	0	0	3(4)	3
Summer Green	FW	6	3	0	0	0	0	6	3
Sarah Ewens	FW	19(2)	16	0	0	0	0	19(2)	16
Anna Filbey	FW	12(1)	8	0	0	0	0	12(1)	8
Josephine Giard	FW	0(1)	0	0	0	0	0	0(1)	0
London Pollard	FW	1(7)	1	0	0	0	0	1(7)	1
Tiree Burchill	FW	0(1)	0	0	0	0	0	0(1)	0
Kathleen McGovern	FW	2(5)	2	0	0	0	0	2(5)	2

=== Goalscorers ===
R	No.	Pos.	Nation	Name	Premiership	Scottish Cup	League Cup	Total
1	11	FW	(Scotland)	Sarah Ewens	16	0	0	16
2	6	DF	(Scotland)	Chloe Craig	11	0	0	11
3	21	FW	(Wales)	Anna Filbey	8	0	0	8
4	7	MF	(United States)	Mariah Lee	6	0	0	6
5	12	MF	(Scotland)	Rachel Donaldson	5	0	0	5
6	5	MF	(Scotland)	Natalie Ross	4	0	0	4
7	10	MF	(Scotland)	Lisa Robertson	3	0	0	3
7	14	MF	(United States)	Sarah Harkes	3	0	0	3
7	7	FW	(Spain)	Anita	3	0	0	3
7	17	FW	(United States)	Summer Green	3	0	0	3
11	3	DF	(England)	Jodie Bartle	2	0	0	2
11	15	DF	(Scotland)	Kelly Clark	2	0	0	2
11	16	DF	(Scotland)	Kate Nicolson	2	0	0	2
11	63	FW	(Scotland)	Kathleen McGovern	2	0	0	2
15	18	DF	(Republic of Ireland)	Caitlin Hayes	1	0	0	1
15	8	MF	(Australia)	Jacynta	1	0	0	1
15	17	MF	(Republic of Ireland)	Izzy Atkinson	1	0	0	1
15	24	MF	(Scotland)	Tegan Bowie	1	0	0	1
15	20	FW	(Scotland)	London Pollard	1	0	0	1
Own goals					1	0	0	1
Total					76	0	0	76

Last updated: 12 April 2026

=== Hat-tricks ===
Player	Against	Result	Date	Competition
(Scotland) Sarah Ewens	(Scotland) Forfar Farmington	10-0 (H)	30 May 2021	League

(H) – Home; (A) – Away; (N) – Neutral

=== Clean sheets ===
As of 12 April 2026.

Rank	Name	Premiership	Scottish Cup	League Cup	Total	Played Games
1	(Scotland) Rachael Johnstone	7	0	0	7	7
1	(Scotland) Chloe Logan	7	0	0	7	14
Total		14	0	0	14	21

== Team Statistics ==
=== League table ===
Pos	Team	Pld	W	D	L	GF	GA	GD	Pts	Qualification or relegation
1	Glasgow City (C)	21	18	2	1	77	16	+61	56	Qualification for the Champions League first round
2	Celtic	21	17	2	2	76	12	+64	53	Qualification for the Champions League first round
3	Rangers	21	16	0	5	76	10	+66	48	
4	Hibernian	21	9	2	10	42	27	+15	29	
5	Spartans	21	9	2	10	29	42	−13	29	
6	Motherwell	21	4	0	17	18	78	−60	12	
7	Forfar Farmington	21	3	2	16	17	90	−73	11	Withdrew from SWPL after season
8	Heart of Midlothian	21	2	2	17	9	69	−60	8	

Rules for classification: 1) Points; 2) Goal difference; 3) Number of goals scored
(C) Champions

=== Results by Round ===
Round	1	2	3	4	5	6	7	8	9	10	11	12	13	14	15	16	17	18	19	20	21
Ground	A	A	H	A	A	H	A	H	H	A	H	H	A	H	H	A	H	A	A	H	A
Result	L	W	W	W	W	D	W	L	W	W	W	W	W	W	D	W	W	W	W	W	W
Position	7	4	3	2	2	3	3	3	3	3	3	3	3	2	3	3	3	2	2	2	2

Updated to match(es) played on 6 June 2021. Source: Matches
A = Away; H = Home; W = Win; D = Draw; L = Loss; P = Postponed
