= 2024–25 Scottish Women's Premier League Cup =

Tournament details
- Country: Scotland
- Teams: 20

Final positions
- Champions: Rangers
- Runners-up: Hibernian

Tournament statistics
- Matches played: 19

The 2024–25 Scottish Women's Premier League Cup was the 23rd edition of the Scottish Women's Premier League's league cup competition, which began in 2002. It was sponsored by Sky Sports and officially known as the Sky Sports Scottish Women's Premier League Cup. The competition was contested by all 20 teams of the two divisions of the Scottish Women's Premier League (SWPL 1 and SWPL 2).

Rangers were the two-time defending champions and they retained the trophy again, defeating Hibernian in the final.

== First round ==
The draw for the First and Second rounds took place on 8 July 2024 at Hampden Park.

1 September 2024	Hamilton Academical	2–1	Kilmarnock	Hamilton
16:00	A. Skelton 51'; S. Townsley 59'		A. Robinson 30'; E. Martin 82'; L. Burns 89'	Stadium: New Douglas Park

1 September 2024	Ayr United	3–7	Livingston	Cumnock
14:00	D. Baird 13', 53'; C. Duthie 70'		K. Canavan 5', 22', 47', 48' J. Murphy 29' A. Fish 36' S. Mulligan 58'	Stadium: Townhead Park

1 September 2024	Gartcairn	3–2	St Johnstone	Motherwell
14:00	Y. Boyce 1'; T. McGonigle 7'; M. Anderson 47', 51'; M. Maxwel 53' K. McDonald-Nguah 69' N. Carter 89'			Stadium: MTC Park

1 September 2024	Boroughmuir Thistle	4–1	Rossvale	Edinburgh
13:00	H. Aitchison 11' (pen.); B. Galbraith 17', 45'; C. Michie 76'		M. Whiteford 8'	Stadium: Meadowbank Stadium

== Second round ==
29 September 2024	Motherwell	1–1 (a.e.t.) (4–3 p)	Hamilton Academical	East Kilbride
16:00	M Quinn 47'		L Berry 90+3'	Stadium: K-Park
	Penalties
	L Berry (penalty missed); ? (penalty scored); ? (penalty scored); ? (penalty scored); ? (penalty scored)		? (penalty scored); ? (penalty scored); ? (penalty scored); ? (penalty missed); ? (penalty missed)

29 September 2024	Dundee United	0–3	Rangers	Dundee
16:00			K. Howat 77'; K. Wilkinson 87'; M. McAulay 90+4'	Stadium: Foundation Park

29 September 2024	Hearts	2–3	Glasgow City	Edinburgh
15:00	O. Adamolekun 36'; J. Richards 86'		W. Forsblom 7'; S. van Diemen 51'; E. Shore 83' (o.g.)	Stadium: Oriam

29 September 2024	Queen's Park	0–7	Hibernian	Stenhousemuir
15:00			L. Taylor 21'; K. McGovern 38', 42', 52'; L. Doran-Barr 56'; E. Adams 72', 74'	Stadium: Ochilview Park

29 September 2024	Partick Thistle	3–2	Spartans	Glasgow
13:00	C. Boyce 9'; C. Henderson 30' (pen.); L. Sinclair 46'		E. Davies 34'; R. McCafferty 83'	Stadium: Petershill Park

29 September 2024	Montrose	0–7	Celtic	Montrose
13:00			M. Carstens 18'; S. Noonan 22', 27'; K. Loferski 32', 35'; C. Barclais 78'; M. Cross 87'	Stadium: Links Park

29 September 2024	Aberdeen	2–0	Gartcairn	Aberdeen
13:00	H. Stewart 25' (pen.), 54'			Stadium: Balmoral Stadium

29 September 2024	Boroughmuir Thistle	8–0	Livingston	Edinburgh
12:00	C. Borthwick 9', 62'; M. Novoa-Torrent 16'; F. Gibson 22'; M. Orr-Lov 49'; E. Reid 68', 73', 89' (pen.)			Stadium: Meadowbank Thistle

== Quarter-finals ==
The draw for the quarter-finals took place on 1 October 2024 at Hampden Park.

10 November 2024	Celtic	0–0 (a.e.t.) (4–3 p)	Glasgow City	Hamilton
16:10				Stadium: New Douglas Park
	Penalties
	Clark (penalty scored); McAneny (penalty missed); McGregor (penalty scored); Agnew (penalty scored); Ross (penalty scored)		Lauder (penalty scored); Evans (penalty scored); Wróbel (penalty missed); Määttä (penalty scored); Kozlova (penalty missed)

10 November 2024	Partick Thistle	1–4	Hibernian	Glasgow
13:00	McCulloch 14'		Lawson 10'; McGovern 66', 71', 74'	Stadium: Petershill Park

10 November 2024	Boroughmuir Thistle	2–1	Aberdeen	Edinburgh
12:00	E. Arthur 5', 55'		H. Stewart 35' (pen.); D. Miller 47'; N. Noble 76'	Stadium: Meadowbank Stadium

9 November 2024	Motherwell	1–8	Rangers	East Kilbride
19:45	A. Sharkey 28'		Eddie 12'; Devlin 20'; Hardy 23'; Wilkinson 32', 37', 73'; McLoughlin 88'; Howat 90'	Stadium: K-Park

== Semi-finals ==
The draw for the semi-finals took place on 12 November 2024 at Hampden Park, Glasgow, Edinburgh.

19 January 2025	Celtic	1–2	Rangers	Hamilton
16:10	Lawton 91'		Hardy 48'; Wilkinson 51'	Stadium: New Douglas Park

19 January 2025	Hibernian	3–0	Aberdeen	Edinburgh
16:00	Grant 31', 84'; Adams 75'			Stadium: Meadowbank Stadium

== Final ==
The venue for the final was announced on 24 January 2025.

22 March 2025
15.00

Hibernian	0–5	Rangers
		Wilkinson 38'; Lafaix 47'; Reilly 49' (o.g.); Howat 82'; Hardy 90+1'

Fir Park, Motherwell
Attendance: 4,031
Referee: Joel Kennedy

Hibernian	Rangers

GK	1	(Scotland) Erin Clachers
DF	22	(Scotland) Lauren Doran-Barr	(substituted off) 60'
DF	4	(Scotland) Siobhan Hunter (c)	(substituted off) 60'
DF	5	(Australia) Stacey Papadopoulos
DF	31	(Scotland) Linzi Taylor
MF	6	(Republic of Ireland) Ciara Grant
MF	8	(Scotland) Michaela McAlonie	(substituted off) 89'
MF	32	(Scotland) Kirsten Reilly
FW	24	(Scotland) Tegan Bowie	(substituted off) 84'
FW	10	(Scotland) Kathleen McGovern	(substituted off) 84'
FW	9	(Scotland) Eilidh Adams
Substitutes:
GK	12	(United States) Noa Schumacher
FW	7	(Scotland) Abbie Ferguson	(substituted on) 84'
FW	15	(Scotland) Lia Tweedie	(substituted on) 89'
DF	16	(Scotland) Ellis Notley	(substituted on) 60'
MF	18	(Scotland) Rosie Livingstone	(substituted on) 60'
FW	29	(Scotland) Kirsty Morrison	(substituted on) 89'
MF	37	(Scotland) Jessica Ramsay
MF	38	(Scotland) Isla Taylor
Manager:
(Scotland) Grant Scott

GK	1	(Scotland) Jenna Fife
DF	2	(Scotland) Nicola Docherty (c)
DF	3	(Scotland) Leah Eddie
DF	4	(Scotland) Kathryn Hill	(substituted off) 84'
MF	23	(Scotland) Kirsty Maclean
MF	19	(Scotland) Chelsea Cornet
MF	20	(United States) Camille Lafaix	(substituted off) 55'
MF	15	(Scotland) Lizzie Arnot	(substituted off) 68'
MF	7	(Scotland) Brogan Hay
FW	9	(Scotland) Kirsty Howat	(substituted off) 84'
FW	44	(England) Katie Wilkinson	(substituted off) 68'
Substitutes:
GK	12	(Iceland) Telma Ívarsdóttir
GK	22	(New Zealand) Victoria Esson
DF	5	(Northern Ireland) Laura Rafferty	(substituted on) 84'
DF	6	(Netherlands) Tessel Middag
FW	10	(England) Rio Hardy	(substituted on) 68'
FW	13	(Scotland) Jane Ross	(substituted on) 84'
MF	24	(England) Olivia McLoughlin	(substituted on) 68'
FW	26	(Scotland) Jodi McLeary	(substituted on) 55'
FW	53	(England) May Cruft
Manager:
(England) Jo Potter

Player of the Match:

Assistant referees:

Fourth official

Match rules

- 90 minutes
- 30 minutes of extra time if necessary
- Penalty shoot-out if scores still level
- Seven named substitutes
- Maximum of six substitutions in normal time
