= Michaela McAlonie =

Scottish footballer

Personal information
- Full name: Michaela Karen McAlonie
- Date of birth: 13 December 2001 (age 24)
- Place of birth: Edinburgh, Scotland
- Position: Midfielder

Team information
- Current team: Southampton

Youth career
- Hutchison Vale
- 2014–2017: Heart of Midlothian

Senior career*
Years	Team	Apps	(Gls)
2017	Heart of Midlothian		
2017–2021	Spartans		
2021–2025	Hibernian	81+	(9+)
2025–	Southampton	22	(5)

International career^{‡}
2016–2017	Scotland U17	7	(1)
2017–2020	Scotland U19	21	(0)
- * Club domestic league appearances and goals as of 1 July 2025 ‡ National team caps and goals as of 22 February 2025

Michaela Karen McAlonie (born 13 December 2001) is a Scottish professional footballer who plays as a midfielder for Southampton in the Women's Super League 2. Her previous clubs in Scotland include Heart of Midlothian, Spartans and Hibernian.

== Club career ==
Raised in Edinburgh where she attended Craigroyston Community High School, McAlonie began her career locally with Hutchison Vale and Heart of Midlothian, making her senior debut in SWPL 2 at the start of the 2017 season, aged 15. She soon moved on to Spartans who offered the opportunity of top-level football at a young age. While developing there, she was named as the league's Player of the Month for April of the 2019 season.

She signed for Hibernian in July 2021, missing the first part of the 2021–22 campaign after being injured against her former club Spartans on the opening matchday. She featured on the losing side against Rangers in the 2022 Scottish Women's Premier League Cup final, and her performances became increasingly important to the team's progression over the subsequent seasons. In February 2025 she signed a new contract to keep her at Hibernian until June 2027, replacing a deal agreed in 2023 which had been close to expiry. A month later she appeared in a second SWPL Cup final, but Hibs were unable to overcome Rangers who this time won by a 5–0 scoreline. They recovered to successfully hold off the challenges of Glasgow City and Rangers and clinched the title on 18 May with a 1–0 victory at Ibrox Stadium, winning the club's first SWPL championship in 17 years.

In August 2025, she moved to English football and signed for Southampton, a month after Hibs teammate Abbie Ferguson made the same move.

== International career ==
McAlonie featured for Scotland at schoolgirl, under-17 and under-19 youth levels, including at the 2019 UEFA Women's Under-19 Championship where the Scots (the host nation) lost all three group matches, but came within minutes of a draw against eventual champions France.
