= Kirsty Howat =

Scottish footballer (born 1997)

Personal information
- Full name: Kirsty Elizabeth Howat-Thomson
- Date of birth: 19 May 1997 (age 29)
- Place of birth: Dumfries, Scotland
- Height: 5 ft 5 in (1.65 m)
- Position: Forward

Team information
- Current team: Crystal Palace
- Number: 10

Youth career
- 2004–2010: Lochar Thistle
- 2010–2012: Dumfries Girls
- 2012–2014: Rangers

Senior career*
Years	Team	Apps	(Gls)
2014–2016	Rangers		
2016–2018	Celtic		
2018–2020	Glasgow City	2	(4)
2020–2025	Rangers	67	(67)
2025–	Crystal Palace	15	(5)

International career^{‡}
2013	Scotland U16	3	(1)
2013	Scotland U17	14	(4)
2014–2016	Scotland U19	15	(5)
2024–	Scotland	5	(2)
- * Club domestic league appearances and goals as of 8 February 2026 ‡ National team caps and goals as of 2 December 2025

Kirsty Elizabeth Howat (born 19 May 1997) is a Scottish footballer who plays as a forward for Crystal Palace in the Women's Super League 2, and for the Scotland national team.

== Career ==
Howat started her career with youth teams Lochar Thistle, Dumfries and Rangers before debuting with the latter in the Scottish Women's Premier League in 2014. The following year she joined Celtic where she spent two seasons. On 18 January 2018 she moved to rivals and reigning champions Glasgow City, winning her first SWPL title and also making her debut in the UEFA Women's Champions League. She left the club with two league titles and one Scottish Women's Cup medal.

In December 2020, Howat returned to Rangers on a pre-contract arrangement agreed six months earlier; her teammate Sam Kerr made the same switch, soon followed by Rachel McLauchlan while Nicola Docherty had made the move across the city some months previously. In her first full season back with the Gers, 2021–22, Howat was part of the squad that won the SWPL for the first time in club history; in the second season they won the Scottish Women's Premier League Cup for the first time (she was among the scorers in the final), and in the third season they retained the SWPL Cup and won their first Scottish Cup. They retained both trophies in 2024–25 (Howat scoring in both finals) and also narrowly missed out on the league title in all three seasons.

In September 2025, Howat signed for Crystal Palace F.C. (Women) on a 2 year deal.

== International career ==
Howat was called up to the Scotland national under-16 team for a friendly tournament in Portugal, where she made appearances in games against Portugal, Netherlands and Austria, scoring her first goal in the match against Austria. A few months later she was drafted into the under-17 team by coach Pauline Hamill for two friendly games against Wales, scoring on her debut. Howat was a member of the squad that contested the qualifiers for the 2014 European Championship in England; these games were played before the end of 2013 to serve as qualification for the Costa Rica World Cup which was scheduled for spring 2014. She was then named in the squad for the 2013 European Championship and played in all three matches: Scotland lost against France 1–0 and Germany 4–2, and drew in the final game against Spain.

In 2014 she was named in the under-19 team and played in the 2014 European Championship; Howat featured in two of the three matches, a 2–0 victory against Belgium and 3–2 defeat against Netherlands, missing the 5–0 loss to Norway. She also played in the 2015 and 2016 European Championship qualification games.

Howat was added to the full Scotland squad for the first time in September 2023, as a replacement for the injured Emma Watson. She was an unused substitute on several occasions before making her debut from the bench against Slovakia in a UEFA Women's Euro 2025 qualifying fixture in Nitra on 13 July 2024.

On 2 December 2025, she scored her first international goal, a brace against China in a friendly match.

== International goals ==
No.	Date	Venue	Opponent	Score	Result	Competition
1.	2 December 2025	Estadio Municipal de Chapín, Jerez de la Frontera, Spain	China	1–0	3–2	Friendly
2.	2 December 2025	Estadio Municipal de Chapín, Jerez de la Frontera, Spain	China	3–0	3–2	Friendly

== Honours ==
=== Club ===
Glasgow City

- Scottish Women's Premier League: 2018, 2019
- Women's Scottish Cup: 2019

Rangers

- Scottish Women's Premier League: 2021–22
- Women's Scottish Cup: 2023–24, 2024–25
- Scottish Women's Premier League Cup: 2022–23, 2023–24, 2024–25
