= Brogan Hay =

Scottish footballer

Personal information
- Full name: Brogan Yvonne Hay
- Date of birth: 1 March 1999 (age 27)
- Place of birth: Rutherglen, Scotland
- Positions: Right winger; forward

Team information
- Current team: Rangers
- Number: 7

Youth career
- 2011–2015: Glasgow City

Senior career*
Years	Team	Apps	(Gls)
2015–2017	Glasgow City		
2017–	Rangers	27	(8)

International career^{‡}
2013	Scotland U15		
2014	Scotland U16	2	(0)
2015–2016	Scotland U17	6	(2)
2016–2018	Scotland U19	10	(0)
2022	Scotland U23	1	(0)
2022–	Scotland	6	(0)
- * Club domestic league appearances and goals as of 14 May 2023 ‡ National team caps and goals as of 29 February 2024

Brogan Yvonne Hay (born 1 March 1999) is a Scottish footballer who plays for Rangers in the Scottish Women's Premier League (SWPL) as a right winger or forward.

== Club career ==
After attending coaching sessions with the charity diversionary initiative 'Moving The Goalposts' as a child, Hay began playing at youth level for Glasgow City at the age of 11. She made her first team debut against Rangers on 28 June 2015, when she was 15. In March 2016, she scored her first senior team goal in the Scottish Women's League Cup against Inverness City.

In October 2017, Hay left Glasgow City and moved to fellow SWPL club Rangers, reuniting with former City youth coach Amy McDonald, who had since become manager of the Gers side. Having recovered from a serious ankle injury to be voted the league's Player of the Month for August/September 2019, she agreed an 18-month professional contract extension with Rangers in December 2019. She was named SWPL Player of the Month for a second time in April 2021, and agreed a further contract extension in April 2022.

== International career ==
Hay has represented Scotland at the under-15 and under-17 levels. In September 2015 she scored two goals, within three minutes, against the Republic of Ireland at Ainslie Park; Scotland won the game 3–0.

In 2017 she was part of the Scotland under-19 squad which qualified for the 2017 UEFA Women's Under-19 Championship, and made one appearance at the finals tournament as a late substitute in a 1–0 loss to Spain.

Hay was called up to the senior squad for the first time in November 2022.

== Personal life ==
Hay was raised in the Fernhill neighbourhood of Rutherglen, and attended Trinity High School in the town.

Her older sister Kodie is also a footballer and a forward who began her career at Glasgow City; both siblings left the club at the same time for more playing opportunities, with Kodie moving to Hamilton Academical and later to Celtic, Motherwell and Partick Thistle. During the 2019 season they played against one another in the Old Firm derby, and subsequently were on opposite sides in a 2023 Scottish Cup semi-final and the 2024 Scottish Women's Premier League Cup final.

Their uncle is former professional footballer Stephen McKeown.

== Career statistics ==
=== International ===
Statistics accurate as of match played 11 April 2023

Scotland
Year	Apps	Goals
2022	1	0
2023	4	0
Total	5	0

== Honours ==
=== Club ===
Glasgow City

- Scottish Women's Premier League: 2015, 2016

Rangers

- Scottish Women's Premier League: 2021–22
- Scottish Women's Cup: 2023–24
- Scottish Women's Premier League Cup: 2022–23, 2023–24, 2024–25
- City of Glasgow Women's Cup: 2022, 2023
