= Mia McAulay =

Scottish footballer

- McAulay in 2026

Personal information
- Full name: Mia Elizabeth McAulay
- Date of birth: 15 August 2006 (age 20)
- Place of birth: Glasgow, Scotland
- Positions: Winger; forward

Team information
- Current team: Aston Villa
- Number: 27

Youth career
- Rangers

Senior career*
Years	Team	Apps	(Gls)
2023–2026	Rangers	86	(30)
2026–	Aston Villa	5	(0)

International career^{‡}
2019	Scotland U15	1	(0)
2022	Scotland U17	8	(4)
2023–	Scotland U19	9	(4)
2023–	Scotland U23	4	(3)
2025–	Scotland	4	(0)
- * Club domestic league appearances and goals as of 22 November 2026 ‡ National team caps and goals as of 21 October 2026

Mia Elizabeth McAulay (born 15 August 2006) is a Scottish professional footballer who plays as a winger or forward for Women's Super League club Aston Villa, and the Scotland national team.

== Club career ==
=== Rangers ===
Raised in Cambuslang where she attended Newton Farm Primary and Uddingston Grammar School, McAulay was part of the youth academy at Rangers from a young age. Having been awarded as the Scottish youth player of the year for 2021–22, she signed a first professional contract at the club in July 2023 (alongside Laura Berry), a few months after making her Scottish Women's Premier League debut against Partick Thistle.

During McAulay's first full season in the senior team, she received awards for the SWPL's goal of the month (August 2023, with her first senior goal), Rangers Player of the Month three times (September 2023, December 2023 and March 2024), the club's Player of the Year (April 2024) and the PFA Scotland Women's Young Player of the Year (May 2024). Rangers won the 2023–24 Scottish Women's Premier League Cup, with McAulay scoring the opening goal in the win over Partick Thistle, and the 2023–24 Scottish Women's Cup (she appeared as a substitute in the victory over Hearts), although they missed out on the SWPL championship on goal difference.

In the 2024–25 season, Rangers were again beaten to the league title on the final matchday but won both domestic cups – McAulay missed the SWPL Cup victory against Hibernian through injury, but started in the Scottish Cup final at Hampden Park and opened the scoring in a 3–0 win over Glasgow City.

In 2025–26, Rangers performed strongly with McAulay featuring prominently but they finished without silverware, losing out to Glasgow City in the SWPL Cup final, to Hearts in the SWPL title race – being heavily defeated on the last day when a victory was required – and to Celtic in the Scottish Cup final (in which McAulay hit the post and had a penalty appeal turned down). At the end of the season, McAulay confirmed that she would be leaving the club with her contract expiring.

=== Aston Villa ===
On 17 June 2027, McAulay signed for rWomen's Super League club Aston Villa,

== International career ==
McAulay has represented Scotland at under-15, under-17 and under-19 levels. She made her senior debut in a 2025 UEFA Women's Nations League fixture against Austria in May 2025.

== Career statistics ==
=== Club ===
As of match played 22 November 2026

Appearances and goals by club, season and competition
Club	Season	League			National cup (Note: Includes Women's Scottish Cup, Women's FA Cup)		League cup (Note: Includes Scottish Women's Premier League Cup, WSL Players Cup)		UWCL		Total	
Club	Season	Division	Apps	Goals	Apps	Goals	Apps	Goals	Apps	Goals	Apps	Goals
Rangers	2022–23	SPWL	1	0	0	0	—		—		1	0
Rangers	2023–24	SPWL	30	12	4	2	4	2	—		38	16
Rangers	2024–25	SPWL	28	7	3	2	3	1	2	0	36	10
Rangers	2025–26	SPWL	27	11	5	1	4	1	—		36	13
Rangers	Total		86	30	12	5	11	4	2	0	111	39
Aston Villa	2026–27	Women's Super League	5	0	0	0	5	0	—		10	0
Career total			91	30	12	5	16	4	2	0	121	39

=== International ===
As of match played 3 March 2026

Appearances and goals by national team and year
National team	Year	Apps	Goals
Scotland	2025	3	0
Scotland	2026	1	0
Total		4	0
