= Nazanin Vaseghpanah =

Sweden international footballer (born 1987)

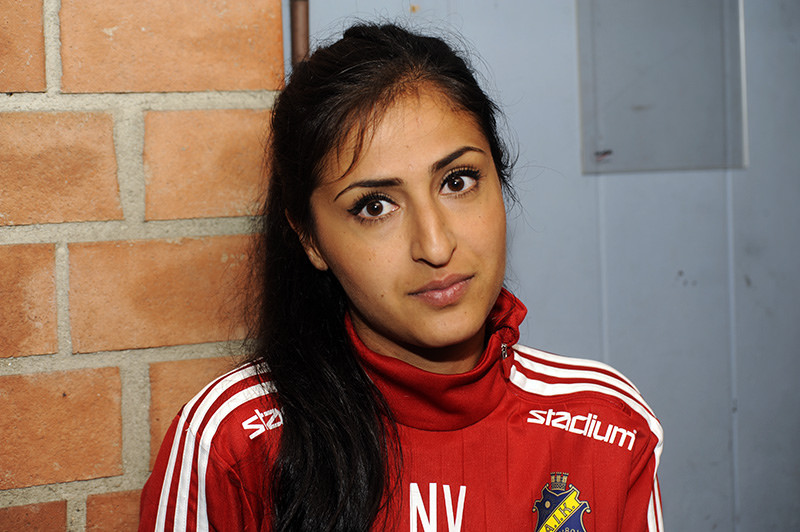
- Vaseghpanah as manager of AIK in 2015

Personal information
- Date of birth: 29 May 1987 (age 39)
- Place of birth: Tehran, Iran
- Position: Forward

Team information
- Current team: Falcao Futsal Club
- Number: 10

Youth career
- 1992–2003: Reymersholms

Senior career*
Years	Team	Apps	(Gls)
2003–2008	AIK		
2008–2010	Hammarby	62	(26)
2010–2012	AIK	42	(14)
2017–2018	Telge United FF	17	(7)
2018–	Falcao Futsal Club	14	(31)

International career^{‡}
	Sweden U17	8	(1)
	Sweden U19	8	(1)
	Sweden U23	15	(4)
2008	Sweden	2	(0)
2018–2019	Sweden (futsal)	16	(14)

Managerial career
- 2015: AIK
- * Club domestic league appearances and goals as of 31 May 2019 ‡ National team caps and goals as of 17:21, 16 March 2026 (UTC)

Nazanin Vaseghpanah (Persian: نازنین واثق پناه; born 29 May 1987) is a Swedish football and futsal player who plays for the Sweden women's national futsal team.

== Football ==
Vaseghpanah has previously played for AIK and Hammarby in the Damallsvenskan, where she was nominated in the Fotbollsgalan in 2008.

== Futsal ==
Vaseghpanah has played for the Swedish women's national futsal team and was one of the leading scorers in the preliminary round of the UEFA Women's Futsal Euro 2019.

== Career statistics ==
As of 1 June 2019

Appearances and goals by club, season and competition
Club	Season	League			Cup		Continental		Total	
Club	Season	Division	Apps	Goals	Apps	Goals	Apps	Goals	Apps	Goals
Hammarby	2008	Damallsvenskan	22	8	0	0	—		22	8
Hammarby	2009	Damallsvenskan	21	12	2	1	—		23	13
Hammarby	2010	Damallsvenskan	19	6	3	3	—		22	9
Hammarby	Total		62	26	5	4	0	0	67	30
AIK	2011	Elitettan	21	12	3	1	—		24	13
AIK	2012	Damallsvenskan	21	2	2	0	—		23	2
AIK	Total		42	14	5	1	0	0	47	15
Telge United FF	2017	Division 1	16	7	0	0	—		16	7
Telge United FF	2018	Division 1	1	0	0	0	—		1	0
Telge United FF	Total		17	7	0	0	0	0	17	7
Career total			121	47	10	5	0	0	131	52
