= Kathryn Hill =

Scottish footballer

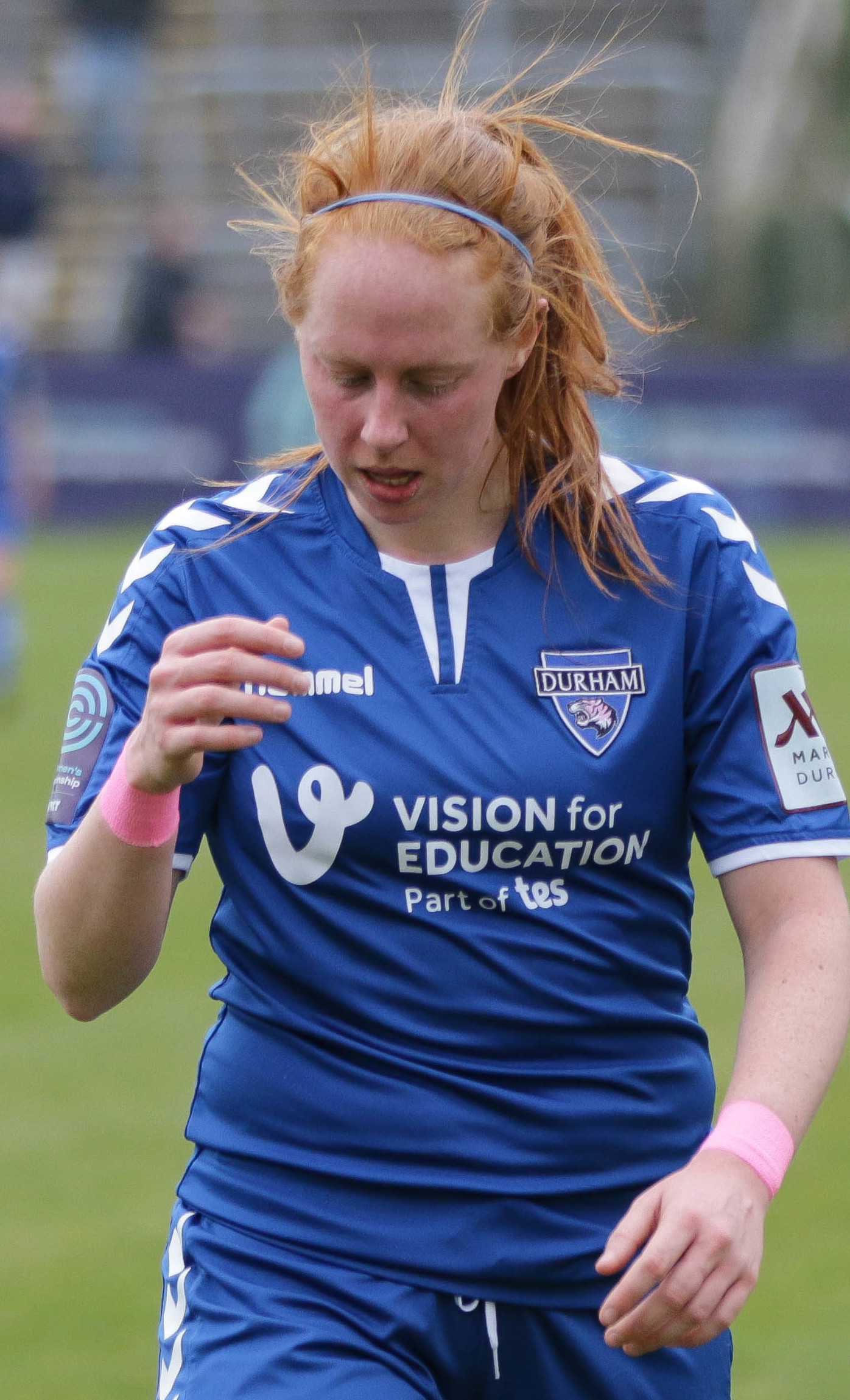
- Kathryn with Durham Women

Personal information
- Full name: Kathryn Hill
- Date of birth: 21 June 1994 (age 32)
- Place of birth: Dalry, Scotland,
- Height: 5 ft 8 in (1.73 m)
- Position: Defender

Team information
- Current team: Rangers
- Number: 4

College career
Years	Team	Apps	(Gls)
2015–2016	Old Dominion Monarchs	38	(3)

Senior career*
Years	Team	Apps	(Gls)
2011–2015	Rangers		
2017–2022	Durham	113	(9)
2022–	Rangers	15	(3)

International career^{‡}
2012-2013	Scotland U19	15	(1)
- * Club domestic league appearances and goals as of 1 May 2023 ‡ National team caps and goals as of 9 April 2013 (UTC)

Kathryn Hill (born 21 June 1994) is a Scottish footballer who currently plays as a defender for Rangers in the Scottish Women's Premier League.

== Club career ==
Hill started her career playing with Rangers and was with the Glasgow club for five years. She then moved to Old Dominion University for two seasons. She captained the team in her final year. In 2017, she moved to Durham, England, in the FA Women's Championship. In 2022, she returned to Rangers and was named team captain.

== International career ==
On 6 March 2012, Hill made her International debut against Sweden in a 0-0 draw with Sweden winning the match on penalties, in the Ten Nation La Manga Under-19 Cup, she was also in the team that defeated France 4-0 in the same competition. She played 2 games a 2-4 defeat against Italy and a 1-0 win against Russia, in the 2012 UEFA Women’s Under-19 Championship Second Qualifying Round. She played in all three of the 2013 UEFA Women’s Under-19 Championship First Qualifying Round, with Two wins against Belarus 8-0 and Turkey 0-2 was followed by a 0-1 defeat by Norway. In March 2013 Scotland again played in the Women’s U-19 Tournament at La Manga, Hill played in 3 games, A 2-1 victory against England was followed by 4-4 draw with Norway and a 3-7 win against Italy. Hill then was part of the team that competed in the 2013 UEFA Women’s Under-19 Championship Second Qualifying Round defeating Austria 0-4, she scored against Ukraine in a 4-2 win and in the last match game lost 1-0 to Denmark.

Hill was selected in a senior Scotland squad for the first time in April 2023.

== Honours ==
=== Club ===
Rangers

- Women's Scottish Cup: 2023–24; runner-up 2022–23
- Scottish Women's Premier League Cup: 2022–23, 2023–24, 2024–25
- City of Glasgow Women's Cup: 2022, 2023
