= Leah Eddie =

Scottish footballer

Personal information
- Date of birth: 23 January 2001 (age 25)
- Place of birth: Falkirk, Scotland
- Position: Defender

Team information
- Current team: Leicester City
- Number: 4

Senior career*
Years	Team	Apps	(Gls)
- Central Ladies Academy
–2018	Rangers		
2018–2024	Hibernian	56+	(4+)
2024–2026	Rangers	41	(0)
2026–	Leicester City	1	(0)

International career^{‡}
2016–2017	Scotland U17	7	(0)
2018	Scotland U19	7	(0)
2021–	Scotland	4	(0)
2022–	Scotland U23	6	(0)
- * Club domestic league appearances and goals as of 6 September 2026 ‡ National team caps and goals as of 26 March 2025

Leah Eddie (born 23 January 2001) is a Scottish footballer who plays as a defender for Leicester City in the Women's Super League 2 and the Scotland national team. She has previously played for Scottish teams Central Ladies Academy, Hibernian and Rangers

== Club career ==
Eddie attended the Performance School at Graeme High School in Falkirk, and played for Central Ladies Academy. After being the first woman who came through the Performance School to be selected for Scotland's national team, she said that she feels it developed and helped her very much, while playing with boys developed her strength and improved her technical ability.

Eddie played for a brief time with Rangers, after which she joined Hibernian in 2018. Not long after debuting against Celtic, she missed most of the 2019 Scottish Women's Premier League season due to a major knee injury.

In May 2021, Eddie was awarded the club's Player of the Year award for the 2020–21 Scottish Women's Premier League season, having led from the back and scoring crucial goals. In October 2022, Eddie reached an appearance milestone after playing 50 games for Hibernian.

During the 2023–24 Scottish Women's Premier League season, Eddie made 27 appearances for the club in all competitions, leading to her being named in the PFA Scotland SWPL Team of the Year and being awarded the club's Player of the Year award a second time. Despite her strong season, the club confirmed that Eddie left the club at the conclusion of her contract.

In May 2024, Eddie returned to Rangers, signing a two-year deal. In March 2025, she lifted her first trophy with the club, after playing in the 5–0 victory over her former club, Hibernian, in the final of the 2024–25 Scottish Women's Premier League Cup.

On 7 July 2026, it was announced that Eddie had signed a three-year contract with Women's Super League 2 club Leicester City following eight seasons in the Scottish Women's Premier League.

== International career ==
Eddie represented Scotland at under-17 and under-19 levels, making seven appearances for each side.

In May 2021, Eddie was called up for the first time for the Scotland senior team ahead of friendlies against Northern Ireland and Wales. She made her international debut the following month in a 1–0 victory over Northern Ireland, coming on as a second-half substitute to replace Brianna Westrup.

In February 2022, Eddie was called up to the Scotland squad for the 2022 Pinatar Cup as an injury replacement together with Rachael Johnstone in place of Erin Cuthbert and Chloe Logan who were withdrawn.

In November 2022, Scotland set-up their under-23 side, and Eddie was selected for the first squad for a match against Panama. She made her debut for the side in the 2–0 victory, coming on as a substitute in the 60th minute, replacing Amy Muir. In September 2023, she was once again called up for the under-23 side for a training camp in Italy, culminating in a friendly she started against Australia which they lost 1–0. Two months later, she was called up for a friendly match against Netherlands, which they lost 3–1 with Eddie playing the full match. In May 2024, she was called up for a pair of friendlies against Denmark. She captained the team in the first match, a 2–1 defeat, but before the second friendly was called up to the senior squad to replace Sarah Ewens in a Euro 2025 qualifying match against Israel. In October 2024, she was selected for the under-23 side again for two friendlies. She played in both matches, a 2–2 draw with Belgium and a 5–1 victory over Czech Republic.
