= Eilidh Adams =

Scottish footballer

Personal information
- Date of birth: 6 April 2004 (age 22)
- Place of birth: Newcastle upon Tyne, England
- Position: Forward

Team information
- Current team: Ipswich Town

Youth career
- Boroughmuir Thistle
- 2017–2019: Hibernian

Senior career*
Years	Team	Apps	(Gls)
2019–2026	Hibernian	149	(70)
2026–	Ipswich Town	0	(0)

International career^{‡}
2018–2019	Scotland U16	5	(0)
2019–2020	Scotland U17	5	(0)
2021–2023	Scotland U19	15	(7)
2023–	Scotland U23	6	(3)
2025–	Scotland	4	(0)
- * Club domestic league appearances and goals as of 25 May 2026 ‡ National team caps and goals as of 6 June 2026

Eilidh Adams (born 6 April 2004) is a Scottish professional footballer who plays as a forward for Ipswich Town of the Women's Super League 2, and for the Scotland women's national team.

== Club career ==
Born in Newcastle upon Tyne to Scottish parents and raised in Edinburgh, Adams began her youth career at Boroughmuir Thistle before joining Hibernian (the club her family supported), making her senior debut in 2019, aged 15. The COVID-19 pandemic disrupted her progress initially, but when football resumed she was named as the Scottish Women's Premier League's Youth Player of the Season for 2020–21. She agreed an improved contract with Hibs in May 2022, and featured on the losing side against Rangers in the 2022 Scottish Women's Premier League Cup final at the end of the year.

After signing further contract extensions in January 2023 and October 2023 to keep her at Hibernian until June 2026, Adams missed the latter part of the 2023–24 season with a broken bone in her foot.

Upon her return at the start of 2024–25 her performances were consistently strong, scoring at the rate of a goal per game as Hibs made a challenge for the title; she was named the SWPL's Player of the Month for January 2025. A month later she appeared in a second SWPL Cup final, but Hibs were unable to overcome Rangers who this time won by a 5–0 scoreline. They recovered to successfully hold off the challenges of Glasgow City and Rangers and clinched the title on 18 May with a 1–0 victory at Ibrox Stadium, winning the club's first SWPL championship in 18 years. Adams won both the Hibernian Women Player of the Year and Fans' Player of the Year awards for 2024–25. She was also nominated for both the PFA Scotland Women's Players' Player of the Year and Young Player of the Year and was named in the SWPL Team of the Year. In November 2025, Adams was voted the Scottish Women's Football 2024–25 SWPL1 Player of the Year.

In August 2025 Adams made her UEFA Women's Champions League debut from the bench against Fortuna Hjørring, then became the first player to score for a Scottish club in the newly-introduced UEFA Women's Europa Cup in a defeat to Inter Milan. In both April and May 2026, Adams won the SWPL 1 Player of the Month Award, becoming only the third player to win consecutive SWPL 1 monthly awards. At the end of the 2025–26 season she won the Hibernian Women Staff Player of the Year award. On 29th June 2026 Hibernian announced that Adams had left the club after making 181 competitive appearances and scoring 89 goals

On 10 July 2026, it was announced that Adams had moved to Women's Super League 2 club Ipswich Town on a two-year contract.

== International career ==
Adams featured for Scotland at Schoolgirl, under-15, under-16, under-17 and under-19 youth levels. In 2023 and 2024 she was selected for the under-23 team, which plays only friendly matches.

She received her first call-up to the senior Scotland squad in February 2025, making her debut as a substitute in a 1–0 2025 UEFA Women's Nations League defeat away to Austria.
