= Sarah Ewens =

Scottish footballer (born 1992)

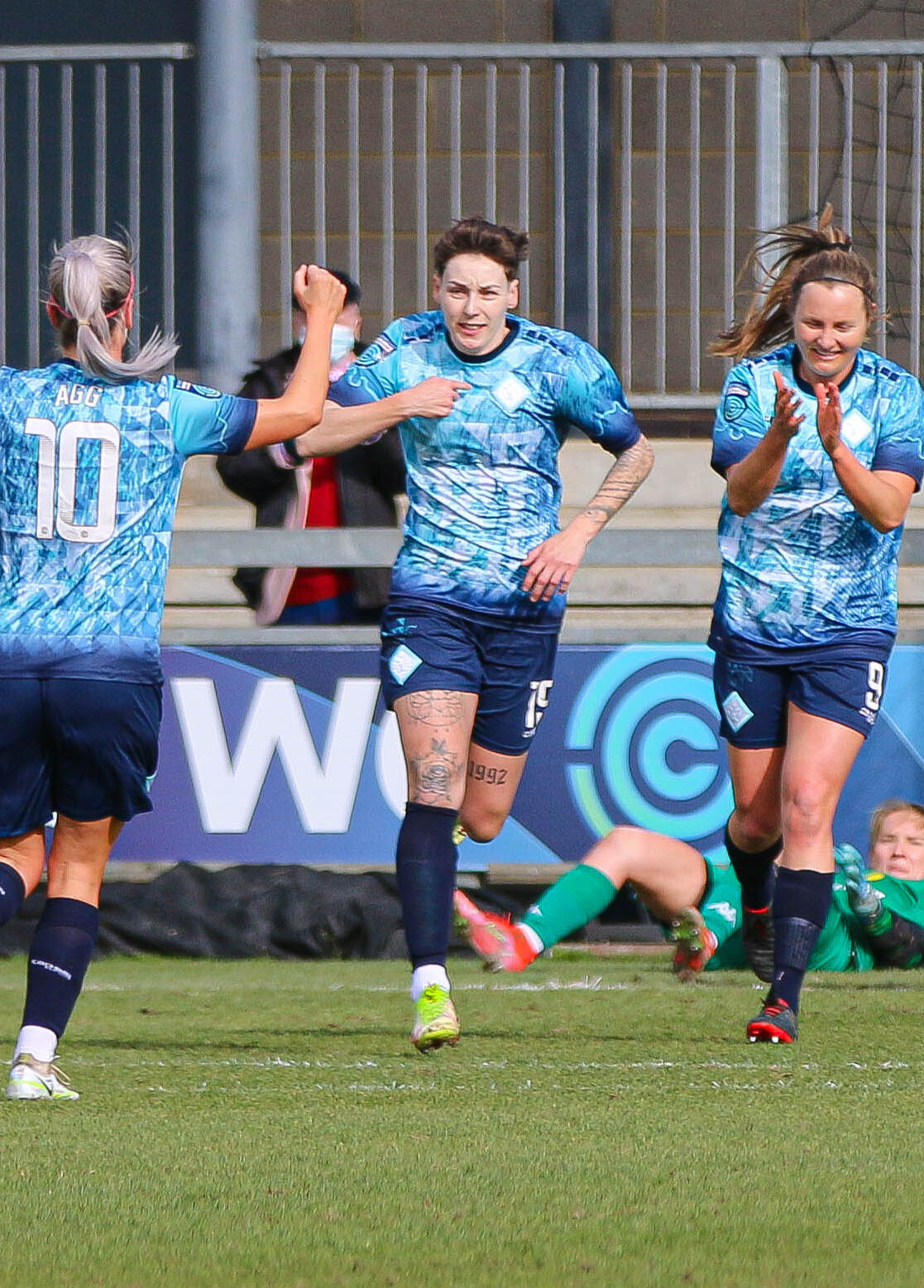
- Ewens (centre) celebrates a goal for London City Lionesses, 2023

Personal information
- Full name: Sarah Ewens
- Date of birth: 19 April 1992 (age 34)
- Place of birth: Edinburgh, Scotland
- Position: Forward

Team information
- Current team: Rangers
- Number: 19

Youth career
- Hutchison Vale

Senior career*
Years	Team	Apps	(Gls)
2009–2015	Spartans	54+	(42+)
2015–2016	Hibernian		
2016–2021	Celtic		
2021–2022	Birmingham City	11	(0)
2022–2023	London City Lionesses	19	(12)
2023–	Rangers	23	(6)

International career^{‡}
2008–2009	Scotland U17	3	(0)
2009–2010	Scotland U19	13	(1)
2024–	Scotland	1	(0)
- * Club domestic league appearances and goals as of 27 May 2024 ‡ National team caps and goals as of 16:44, 5 April 2024 (UTC)

Sarah Ewens (born 19 April 1992) is a Scottish professional footballer who plays as a forward for Rangers.

== Club career ==
After finishing on the losing side in three SWPL Cup finals and one Scottish Women's Cup final in her early career with Spartans, Ewens moved to Hibernian where she won both those trophies in the 2016 season but struggled to claim a place in the starting line-up, then signed for Celtic in December of that year. She scored 64 goals in 98 appearances for Celtic across the next four seasons (but had disappointment in two further SWPL Cup finals against former side Hibs), before joining Birmingham City for an undisclosed transfer fee in July 2021.

After joining Rangers in 2023, she came off the bench in both the 2024 Scottish Women's Premier League Cup final and the 2024 Scottish Women's Cup final as her team won both trophies, also narrowly missing out on the league title.

== International career ==
Ewens was selected in a senior Scotland squad for the first time in April 2023.
