= Scotland women's national under-23 football team =

Scotland
- Nickname: –
- Association: Scottish Football Association
- Head coach: Michael McArdle

First international
- Scotland 0–3 Sweden (Avesta, Sweden; 15 July 2008)

Biggest defeat
- Scotland 0–5 Germany (Falun, Sweden; 17 July 2008); Scotland 0–5 Switzerland (Ludvika, Sweden; 21 July 2008)

The Scotland women's under-23 national football team, controlled by the Scottish Football Association, is considered to be a feeder team for the Scotland women's national football team. As there is no competition organized by FIFA or UEFA for women at under-23 level, the team represents the country usually either in friendlies or invitational tournaments. Scotland fielded an under-23 team at the 2008 Nordic Cup, and has since played friendlies against Panama in 2022, and against Australia and the Netherlands in 2023. They are due to play two friendlies against Denmark in 2024.

== History ==
The under-23 team is intended to bridge the gap in the step up from the under-19 team to the full national team. It would allow younger players a chance to remain in the national team set-up longer term and an opportunity to remain in the national team manager's plans and possibly provide the players with the most promise a pathway into the full national team eventually.

== Tournaments ==
=== 2008 Nordic Cup ===
Year	Competition	Result	GP	W	D*	L	GS	GA	Ref
(Sweden) 2008	Nordic Cup	Fourth Place	4	0	0	4	0	15	

== Results ==
15 July 2008 Nordic Cup	Scotland	0–3	Sweden	Avesta, Sweden
19:00		Scottish FA	Edlund 37'; Vaseghpanah 50'; Stålhammar 59'	Stadium: Avesta Vallen

17 July 2008 Nordic Cup	Scotland	0–5	Germany	Falun, Sweden
19:00		Scottish FA	Schmidt 14', 43'; Kerschowski 24', 76'; Hartel 83'	Stadium: Kopparvallen

19 July 2008 Nordic Cup	Scotland	0–2	Finland	Borlänge, Sweden
16:00		Scottish FA	Sällström 12', 24'	Stadium: Domnarvsvallen

21 July 2008 Nordic Cup	Scotland	0–5	Switzerland	Ludvika, Sweden
13:00		Scottish FA	Bachmann 42', 71'; Dickenmann 49', 60'; Brunner 90'	Stadium: Hillangens IP

12 November 2022 Friendly	Scotland	2–0	Panama	Jerez, Spain
	Harrison; Clark	Report		Stadium: Estadio Municipal de Chapín

26 September 2023 Friendly	Australia	1–0	Scotland	Varese, Italy
11:30 CEST				Stadium: AIS European Training Centre

1 December 2023 Friendly	Netherlands	3–1	Scotland	San Pedro del Pinatar, Spain
	Kalma 38', 45'; Muir 85' (o.g.)	Report	Tuin 9' (o.g.)	Stadium: Pinatar Arena

30 May 2024 Friendly	Denmark	2–1	Scotland	Ringkøbing, Denmark
	2'; 62'	Report	48' (pen.)	Stadium: Alkjær Stadion

2 June 2024 Friendly	Denmark	1–3	Scotland	Skjern, Denmark
		Report		Stadium: Skjern Stadion

24 October 2024 Friendly	Belgium	2–2	Scotland	Tubize, Belgium
	Ampoorter 74'; Reynders 90+3'	Report	McGovern 54' (pen.); Hutchison 83'	Stadium: Proximus Basecamp

28 October 2024 Friendly	Scotland	5–1	Czech Republic	Falkirk, Scotland
	McAulay 8'; Adams 23', 49'; Bowie 73'; McGovern 83'		Šubrtová 55'	Stadium: Falkirk Stadium
