= Kathleen McGovern =

Scottish footballer (born 2002)

Kathleen Mary McGovern
Personal information
- Full name: Kathleen Mary McGovern
- Date of birth: 27 June 2002 (age 24)
- Place of birth: Wishaw, Scotland
- Height: 1.70 m (5 ft 7 in)
- Position: Forward

Team information
- Current team: Newcastle United
- Number: 9

Youth career
- 2010–2018: Celtic

Senior career*
Years	Team	Apps	(Gls)
2018–2022	Celtic		
2021	→ Hamilton Academical (loan)		
2022–2023	SC Sand	21	(3)
2023–2024	Heart of Midlothian	19	(11)
2024–2026	Hibernian	28	(25)
2026–	Newcastle United	1	(0)

International career^{‡}
2016–2018	Scotland U16	5	(1)
2017–2019	Scotland U17	11	(2)
2019	Scotland U19	4	(1)
2024–	Scotland U23	3	(3)
2025–	Scotland	12	(7)
- * Club domestic league appearances and goals as of 31 May 2025 ‡ National team caps and goals as of 15 October 2026

Kathleen Mary McGovern (born 27 June 2002) is a Scottish footballer who plays as a forward for Women's Super League 2 (WSL2) club Newcastle United and the Scotland national team.

She has previously played for SWPL clubs Hibernian, Celtic, Hamilton Academical (on loan) and Heart of Midlothian, and 2. Frauen-Bundesliga club SC Sand.

== Career ==
On 14 July 2026, McGovern was announced at Newcastle United.

== International career ==
On 30 May 2025, she made her debut for Scotland in 1–0 loss against Austria at 2025 UEFA Women's Nations League. She scored her first international goal against Netherlands in 1–1 draw.

== International goals ==
No.	Date	Venue	Opponent	Score	Result	Competition
1.	3 June 2025	Koning Willem II Stadion, Tilburg, Netherlands	Netherlands	1–1	1–1	2025 UEFA Women's Nations League
2.	28 October 2025	East End Park, Dunfermline, Scotland	Switzerland	1–1	3–4	Friendly
3.	3 March 2026	Stade Émile Mayrisch, Esch-sur-Alzette, Luxembourg	Luxembourg	5–0	5–0	2027 FIFA Women's World Cup qualification
4.	7 March 2026	Hampden Park, Glasgow, Scotland	Luxembourg	1–0	7–0	2027 FIFA Women's World Cup qualification
5.	7 March 2026	Hampden Park, Glasgow, Scotland	Luxembourg	3–0	7–0	2027 FIFA Women's World Cup qualification
6.	14 April 2026	Easter Road, Edinburgh, Scotland	Belgium	1–1	1–1	2027 FIFA Women's World Cup qualification
7.	13 October 2026	St Mirren Park, Paisley, Scotland	Czech Republic	2–2	3–2	2027 FIFA Women's World Cup play-offs

== Honours ==
Celtic

- SWPL Cup: 2021–22

Heart of Midlothian

- Scottish Women's Cup: runner-up 2023–24

Hibernian

- Scottish Women's Premier League: 2024-25
- SWPL Cup: runner-up 2024-25
