= Siobhan Hunter =

Scottish footballer (born 1994)

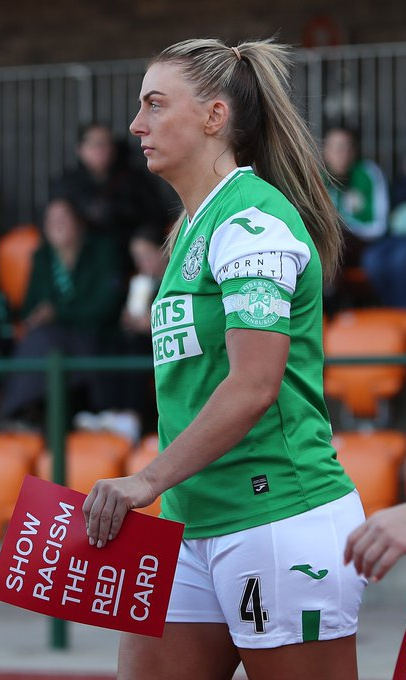
- Siobhan Hunter

Personal information
- Date of birth: 10 April 1994 (age 32)
- Place of birth: Edinburgh, Scotland
- Position: Defender

Team information
- Current team: Hibernian
- Number: 4

Senior career*
Years	Team	Apps	(Gls)
2012–	Hibernian	316	(52)

International career^{‡}
2009	Scotland U15	1	(0)
2009–2011	Scotland U17	16	(4)
2011–2013	Scotland U19	14	(1)
2013	Scotland	2	(0)
- * Club domestic league appearances and goals ‡ National team caps and goals as of 28 May 2024

Siobhan Hunter (born 10 April 1994) is a Scottish footballer who plays as a defender for Hibernian in the Scottish Women's Premier League.

== Club career ==
Hunter first signed with Hibernian youth as a 9-year old in March 2004.

In the 2017 Scottish Cup final against Glasgow City, Hunter scored the third goal with a 40-yard free kick, in a 3–0 win. The goal was nominated for, and subsequently won, the Women's Soccer United goal of the month.

Returning from a broken collarbone, Hunter came on as a substitute in the 2018 SWPL Cup Final, in which Hibs beat Celtic 9–0 at Falkirk Stadium.

Hunter has played over 250 times for Hibernian, reaching that landmark in October 2022.

== International career ==
Hunter has been capped for the Scotland Under 15, Under 17, Under 19 and senior international teams. She wore the captain's armband throughout the 2012–13 UEFA Women's Under-19 Championship qualifying campaign, including the elite round matches in Livingston and Hamilton in April 2013.

Hunter appeared over 30 times at youth levels before being capped at full level; she made her debut for Scotland in a 3–2 friendly win over Iceland in Reykjavík in June 2013, and received a second cap in the same year.

== Personal life ==
In June 2022, Hunter became engaged to Hibernian teammate Shannon McGregor on holiday in Tenerife. In January 2024, both were given a leave of absence by the club after Hunter's mother suffered serious injuries in an accidental fall, coincidentally also occurring in Tenerife.

== Honours ==
Hibernian

- Scottish Women's Premier League: 2024–25
- Scottish Women's Cup: 2016, 2017, 2018
  - Runner-up 2013, 2015, 2019
- Scottish Women's Premier League Cup: 2016, 2017, 2018, 2019
  - Runner-up 2015, 2022–23, 2024–25
