= Chelsea Cornet =

Scottish footballer (born 1998)

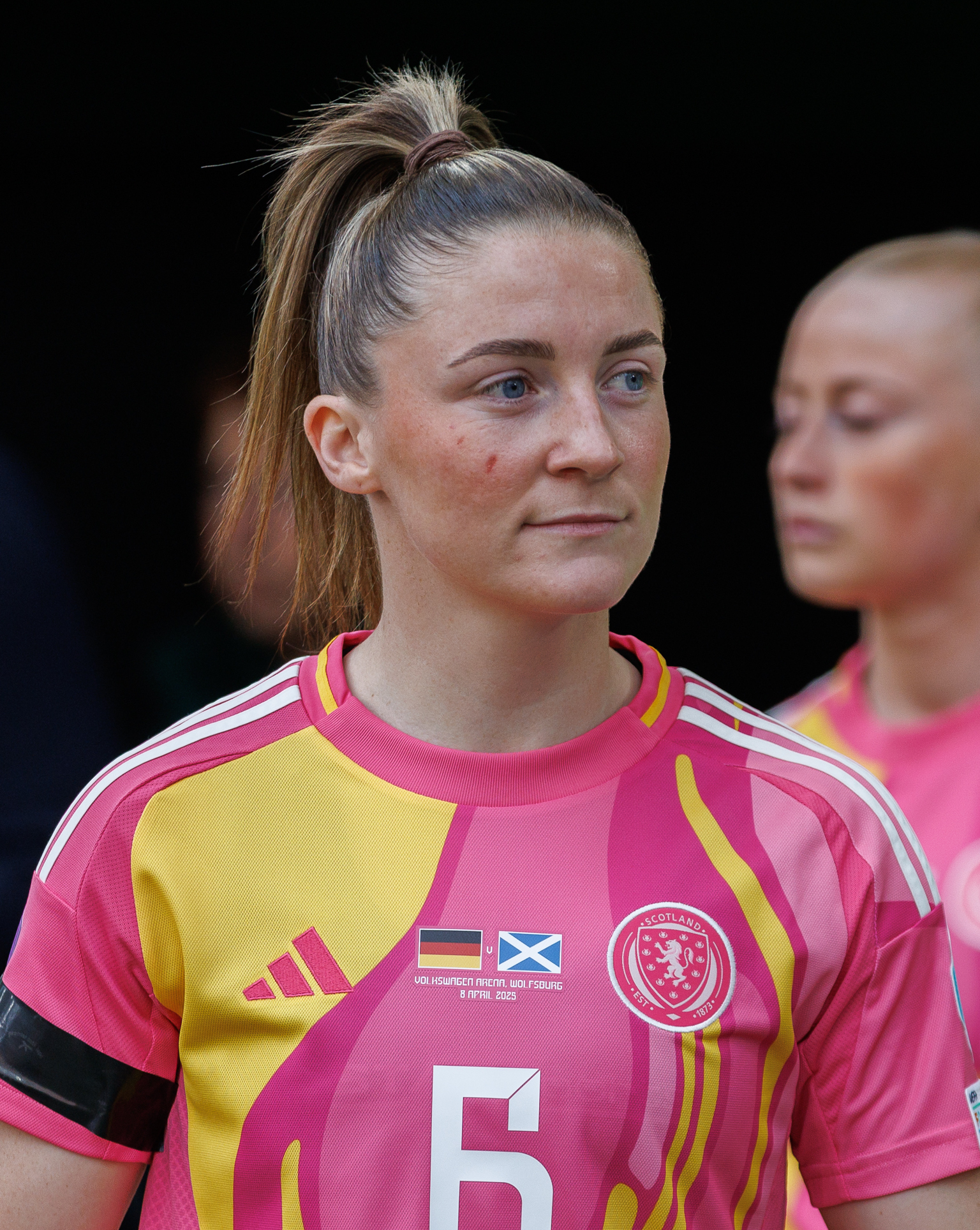
- Cornet in Scotland kit, 2025

Personal information
- Full name: Chelsea Anna Cornet
- Date of birth: 24 November 1998 (age 27)
- Place of birth: Edinburgh, Scotland
- Position: Midfielder

Team information
- Current team: Birmingham City
- Number: 19

Youth career
- Loanhead Miners Boys Club
- Heart of Midlothian Girls
- Hibernian Girls

Senior career*
Years	Team	Apps	(Gls)
2015–2020	Hibernian		
2020–2025	Rangers		
2025–	Birmingham City	0	(0)

International career^{‡}
2012	Scotland U15	2	(0)
2013–2014	Scotland U16	6	(1)
2013–2015	Scotland U17	20	(2)
2015–2017	Scotland U19	16	(1)
2023–	Scotland	19	(1)
- * Club domestic league appearances and goals as of 1 October 2022 ‡ National team caps and goals as of 15 October 2026

Chelsea Anna Cornet (born 19 April 1998) is a Scottish professional footballer who plays as a midfielder for Women's Super League club Birmingham City and the Scotland national team. She was born in Edinburgh, Scotland.

== Career ==
Born in Edinburgh, Cornet started her football career at youth level with Loanhead Miners Boys Club and then moved to Hearts Girls before joining Hibernian, where she won three SWPL Cups and two Scottish Cup titles. She signed for Rangers on 8 January 2020. The Rangers manager Jo Potter praised Cornet as a "big game player". Cornet explained she moved to Rangers because she "wanted a new challenge". She signed an extension to her contract in May 2021. During her time with Rangers, she scored the winning goal in the Old Firm derby against Celtic in 2024. She was regularly praised for her performances and made regular appearances in the Scottish Women's Premier League "Team of the Week". In June 2025, it was announced that Cornet had been released from Rangers following the expiration of her contract. On 3 July 2025, it was announced that Cornet had signed a two-year contract at Birmingham City.

== International career ==
Cornet represented Scotland at schools, under-15, under-16, under-17, and under-19 level. She played in the 2014 UEFA Women's Under-17 Championship and the 2017 UEFA Women's Under-19 Championship. She was first called into the full Scotland international squad in April 2023, and made her debut in a 1–0 win against Australia.

== Personal life ==
In 2023, Cornet was inducted into Loanhead's Hall of Fame, becoming the first woman footballer inducted.

== Honours ==
Hibernian

- Women's Scottish Cup: 2017, 2018
- Scottish Women's Premier League Cup: 2017, 2018, 2019

Rangers

- Scottish Women's Premier League 2021-22
- Women's Scottish Cup: 2023–24; runner-up 2022–23
- Scottish Women's Premier League Cup: 2022–23, 2023–24, 2024–25
- City of Glasgow Women's Cup: 2022, 2023

Birmingham City

- Women's Super League 2: 2025–26

== International goals ==
No.	Date	Venue	Opponent	Score	Result	Competition
1.	4 June 2024	Budaörsi Városi Stadium, Budaörs, Hungary	Israel	5–0	5–0	UEFA Women's Euro 2025 qualifying
