= 2023–24 Scottish Women's Premier League Cup =

Tournament details
- Country: Scotland
- Teams: 20

Final positions
- Champions: Rangers
- Runners-up: Partick Thistle

Tournament statistics
- Matches played: 19

The 2023–24 Scottish Women's Premier League Cup was the 22nd edition of the Scottish Women's Premier League's league cup competition, which began in 2002. It was sponsored by Sky Sports and officially known as the Sky Sports Scottish Women's Premier League Cup. The competition was contested by all 20 teams of the two divisions of the Scottish Women's Premier League (SWPL 1 and SWPL 2).

Rangers were the defending champions, and they defended their title with a victory over Partick Thistle in the final.

== First round ==
The draw for the First and Second rounds took place on 31 July 2023 at Hampden Park.

3 September 2023	Gartcairn	3–4 (a.e.t.)	Kilmarnock	Airdrie
14:00	Megan Wands 2'; Abby Skelton 18'; Madilyn Wilson 95'		Kelsy Crainie 8'; Lucie Burns 29', 105'; Georgina McTear 94'	Stadium: MTC Park

3 September 2023	Queen's Park	1–0 (a.e.t.)	Glasgow Women	Glasgow
15:00	Ellie Kane 119'			Stadium: New Tinto Park

3 September 2023	St Johnstone	3–2 (a.e.t.)	Livingston	Perth
12:00	Steffi Simson 7'; Elvie McLean 89'; Fern Newbigging 119'		Erin Burns 9', 46'	Stadium: Riverside Stadium

3 September 2023	Stirling University	0–3	Boroughmuir Thistle	Stirling
13:00			Fiona Gibson 3'; Deborah McLeod 45'; Cara Borthwick 56'	Stadium: Gannochy Sports Centre

== Second round ==
1 October 2023	Hamilton Academical	0–6	Celtic	Hamilton
16:00			Shen Menglu 4'; Caitlin Hayes 7'; Paula Partido 16'; Celya Barclais 23'; Nourimane Addi 53'; Colette Cavanagh 75'	Stadium: New Douglas Park

1 October 2023	Heart of Midlothian	1–4	Rangers	Edinburgh
15:00	Olufolasade Adamolekun 28'		Rio Hardy 18'; Jodi McLeary 43'; Mia Mcaulay 69'; Kirsty Howat 81'	Stadium: Oriam

1 October 2023	Hibernian	6–2	Aberdeen	Edinburgh
12:00	Jorian Baucom 8' (pen.), 61'; Poppy Lawson 45', 90'; Abbie Ferguson 51'; Siobhan Hunter 63', 89'		Darcie Miller 36', 38'	Stadium: Meadowbank Stadium

1 October 2023	Partick Thistle	2–0	Spartans	Glasgow
16:00	Cara Henderson 46'; Linzi Taylor 54'			Stadium: Petershill Park

1 October 2023	Boroughmuir Thistle	4–3	Queen's Park	Edinburgh
13:00	Maria Novou Torrente 30'; Fiona Gibson 50'; Beth Macleod 67'; Mhari Smith 89'		Abby Callaghan 47', 78'; Caitlin McKee 76'	Stadium: Meggetland Sports Complex

1 October 2023	Kilmarnock	0–3	Dundee United	Kilmarnock
14:00			Rachel Todd 7', 14' (pen.); Robyn Smith 32'	Stadium: Rugby Park

1 October 2023	St Johnstone	1–11	Glasgow City	Glasgow
13:00	Morgan Steedman 47'		Laura Steedman 3' (o.g.); Cori Sullivan 22' (pen.), 35', 60', 85'; Lisa Forrest 32', 80'; Brenna Lovera 37'; Lauren Davidson 64' (pen.); Anna Oskarsson 72'; Kinga Kozak 90'	Stadium: Petershill Park

1 October 2023	Montrose	3–0	Motherwell	Montrose
13:00	Aimee Ridgeway 22'; Neve Guthrie 66'; Louise Anne Brown 75'			Stadium: Links Park

== Quarter-finals ==
The draw for the quarter-finals took place on Thursday, 5 October 2023 at Hampden Park.

10 November 2023	Celtic	3–0	Glasgow City	Airdrie
18:45	Natalie Ross 6'; Amy Gallacher 52'; Kit Loferski 72'			Stadium: Excelsior Stadium

12 November 2023	Hibernian	7–0	Dundee United	Edinburgh
16:00	Eilidh Adams 18', 55', 61'; Jorian Baucom 53'; Ellis Notley 72'; Siobhan Hunter 74'; Lauren Doran-Barr 80'			Stadium: Meadowbank Stadium

12 November 2023	Partick Thistle	2–1	Montrose	Airdrie
13:00	Rachel Donaldson 77'; Imogen Longcake 80'		Louise Anne Brown 60'	Stadium: Excelsior Stadium

12 November 2023	Rangers	7–0	Boroughmuir Thistle	Montrose
16:00	Tessel Middag 1'; Megan Bell 11'; Rio Hardy 41', 48'; Kirsty Howat 75'; Laura Berry 69'; Eilidh Austin 84'			Stadium: Links Park

== Semi-finals ==
The draw for the semi-finals took place on Tuesday, 16 November 2023 at Tynecastle Park, Edinburgh.

19 January 2024	Celtic	2–3	Rangers	Cumbernauld
17:35	Chloe Craig 55' (pen.), 90' (pen.)		Kathryn Hill 66'; Kirsty MacLean 81'; Rio Hardy 90+5' (pen.)	Stadium: Broadwood Stadium

21 January 2024	Partick Thistle	2–0	Hibernian	Glasgow
16:10	Linzi Taylor 26'; Rosie Slater 57'			Stadium: Petershill Park

== Final ==
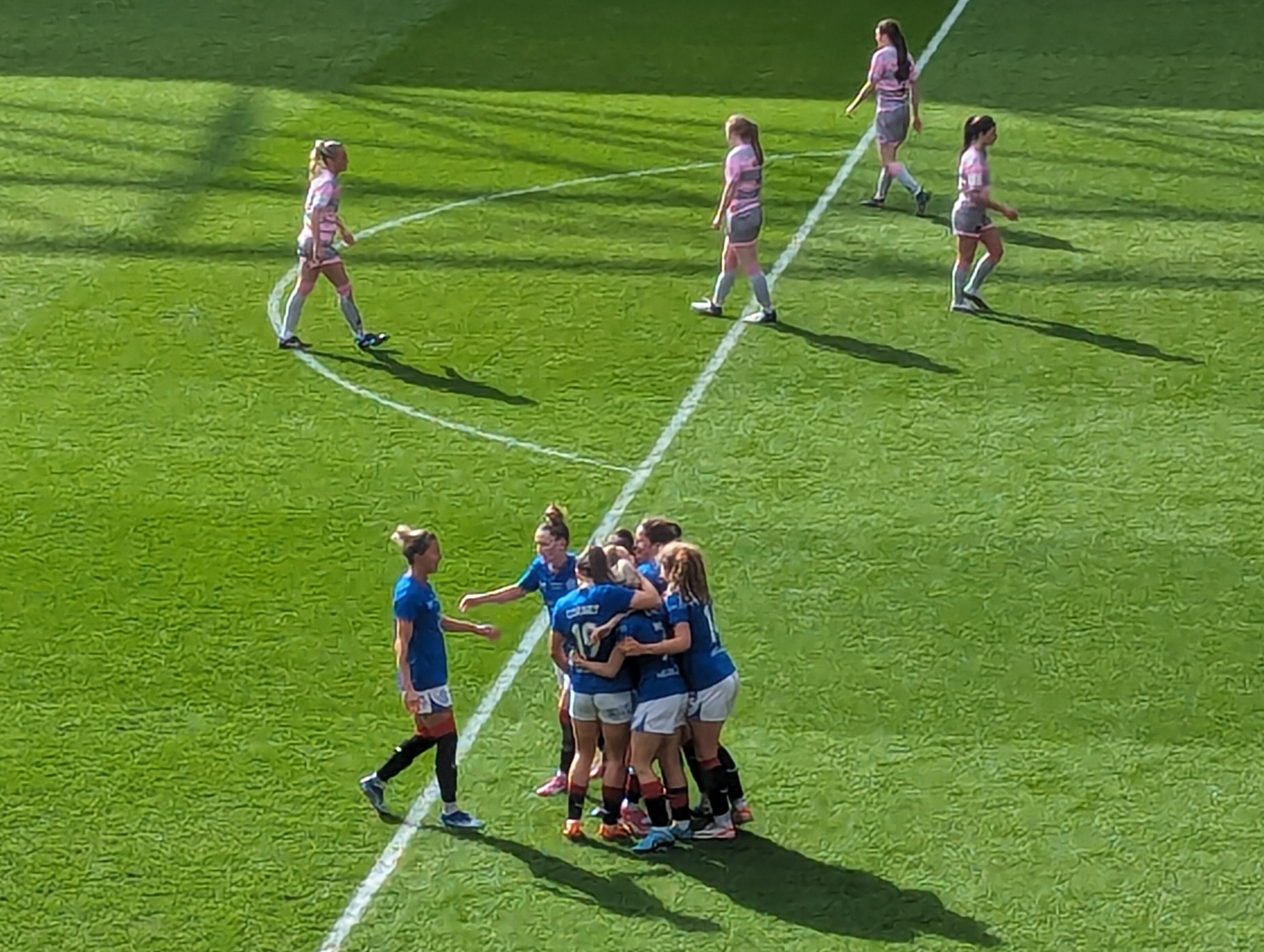
Rangers players celebrating a goal

The venue for the final was announced on Tuesday, 16 November 2023

24 March 2024
13.30

Rangers	4–1	Partick Thistle
McAulay 13'; Rowe 35'; Hardy 47'; McLoughlin 53'		Donaldson 18'

Tynecastle Park, Edinburgh
Attendance: 4,786
