= Sofia Määttä =

Finnish footballer (born 2004)

Personal information
- Date of birth: 20 September 2004 (age 22)
- Place of birth: Finland
- Position: Midfielder

Team information
- Current team: Glasgow City

Youth career
- –2019: Pallo-Iirot

Senior career*
Years	Team	Apps	(Gls)
2019–2020	Pallo-Iirot	10	(10)
2020–2023	Ilves	60	(11)
2024	Umeå IK	12	(3)
2024–	Glasgow City	10	(8)

International career^{‡}
2019	Finland U17	5	(1)
2022	Finland U18	2	(0)
2021–2023	Finland U19	19	(1)
2024–	Finland	1	(0)
- * Club domestic league appearances and goals as of 31 December 2024 ‡ National team caps and goals as of 31 December 2024

Sofia Määttä (born 20 September 2004) is a Finnish professional footballer who plays as a midfielder for Scottish Women's Premier League club Glasgow City and the Finland national team.
