= Camille Lafaix =

American footballer

Personal information
- Full name: Camille Margaux Lafaix
- Date of birth: May 29, 2001 (age 25)
- Place of birth: Los Gatos, California, United States
- Height: 1.58 m (5 ft 2 in)
- Position: Midfielder

Team information
- Current team: OH Leuven

College career
Years	Team	Apps	(Gls)
2019–2022	Cal Poly Mustangs	58	(17)

Senior career*
Years	Team	Apps	(Gls)
2023–2024	Bordeaux	12	(0)
2024–2026	Rangers	38	(8)
2026–	OH Leuven	0	(0)
- * Club domestic league appearances and goals as of 18:15, 31 July 2026 (UTC)

Camille Margaux Lafaix (born May 29, 2001) is an American professional soccer player who most recently played as a midfielder for OH Leuven in the Belgian Women's Super League.

== Early years ==
For the Cal Poly Mustangs, Lafaix won the Big West Midfielder of the Year Award in both 2021 and 2022, becoming the first player to earn the accolade in two consecutive seasons.

== Professional career ==
In August 2023, Lafaix signed with FC Girondins de Bordeaux in France.

In August 2024, Lafaix joined Scottish Women's Premier League side Rangers on a one-year contract. She signed a one-year contract extension with the club in June 2025. In June 2026, Rangers announced that Lafaix would depart the club.
