= Natalia Wróbel =

Polish footballer (born 2003)

Personal information
- Date of birth: 9 August 2003 (age 23)
- Place of birth: Poland
- Position: Midfielder

Team information
- Current team: RC Strasbourg

Youth career
- AZS UJ Kraków

Senior career*
Years	Team	Apps	(Gls)
2017–2022	AZS UJ Kraków	78	(16)
2017–2018	→ Respekt Myślenice (loan)	15	(6)
2022–2024	Brøndby	46	(11)
2024–2026	Glasgow City	50	(17)
2026–	RC Strasbourg	0	(0)

International career^{‡}
2018–2020	Poland U17	17	(5)
2021–2022	Poland U19	10	(3)
2024–	Poland U23	2	(2)
2021–	Poland	20	(2)
- * Club domestic league appearances and goals as of 19:44, 2 June 2026 (UTC) ‡ National team caps and goals as of 19:52, 2 December 2025 (UTC)

Natalia Wróbel (Polish: [naˈtalja ˈvrubɛl]; born 9 August 2003) is a Polish professional footballer who plays as a midfielder for Première Ligue club RC Strasbourg Alsace and the Poland national team.

== Club career ==
She started her career with Polish side AZS UJ Kraków. After that, she was sent on loan to Polish side Respekt Myślenice. In 2022, she signed for Danish side Brøndby. She has been described as "one of the most talented young generation footballers" in Poland.

On 12 July 2024, she signed a three-year deal with Scottish club Glasgow City.

On 1 July 2026, Wróbel moved to French side RC Strasbourg on a three-year contract.

== International career ==
She has represented Poland internationally at youth level. She made her senior team debut against Kosovo on 25 November 2021.

== Personal life ==
She was born in 2003 in Poland. She has a brother.

== Career statistics ==
=== International ===
As of match played 2 December 2025

Appearances and goals by national team and year
National team	Year	Apps	Goals
Poland	2021	1	0
Poland	2022	5	2
Poland	2023	9	0
Poland	2024	4	0
Poland	2025	1	0
Total		20	2

Scores and results list Poland's goal tally first, score column indicates score after each Wróbel goal.

List of international goals scored by Natalia Wróbel
No.	Date	Venue	Opponent	Score	Result	Competition
1	6 October 2022	Estadio Municipal de Chapín, Jerez de la Frontera, Spain	Morocco	3–0	4–0	Friendly
2	11 November 2022	KSZO Municipal Sports Stadium, Ostrowiec Świętokrzyski, Poland	Romania	4–0	6–0	Friendly

== Honours ==
Glasgow City

- Scottish Women's Premier League Cup: 2025–26
