= Amy Muir =

Scottish footballer (born 2000)

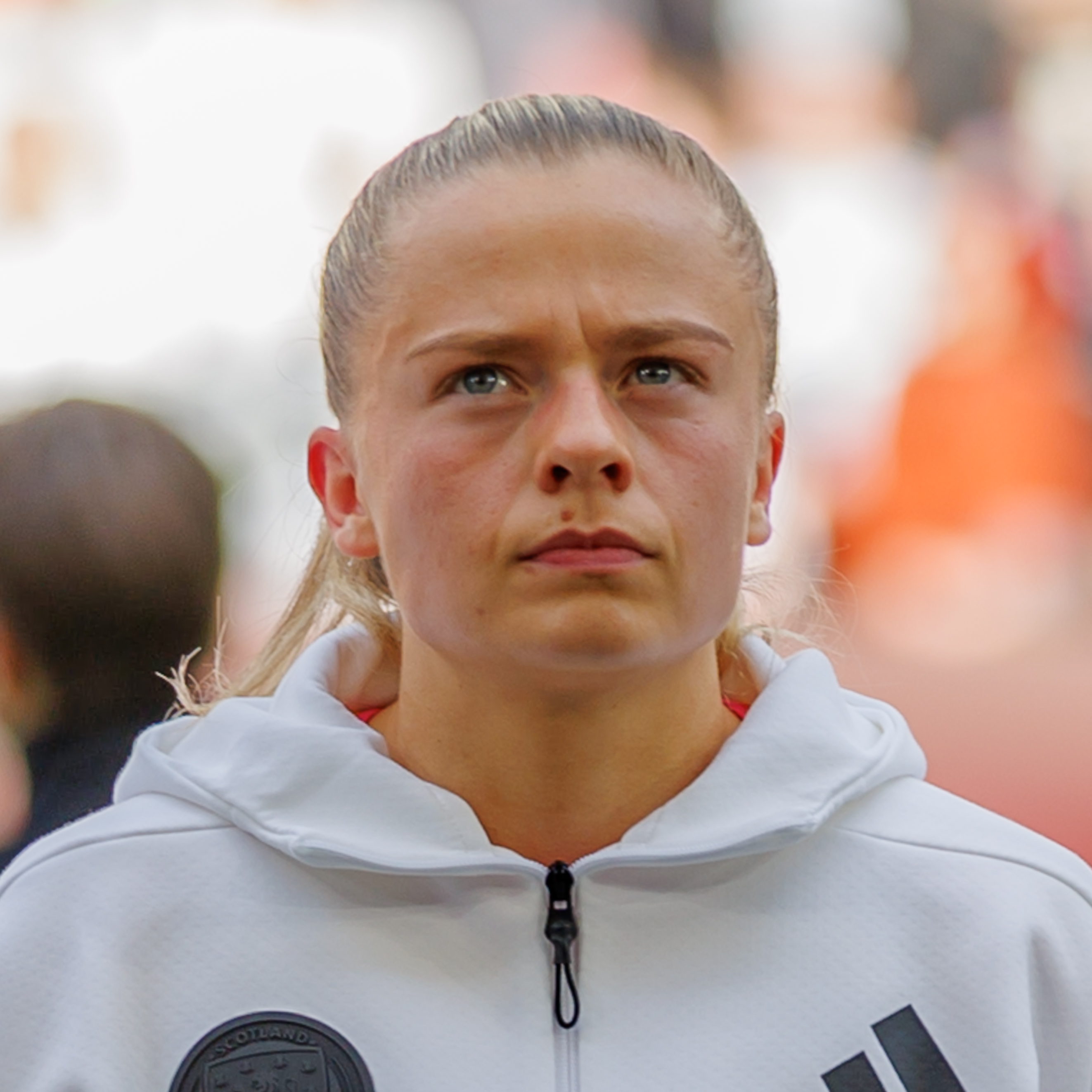
- Muir lining up for Scotland, 2025

Personal information
- Date of birth: 7 March 2000 (age 26)
- Place of birth: Scotland
- Position: Full back

Team information
- Current team: Glasgow City
- Number: 3

Senior career*
Years	Team	Apps	(Gls)
2013–2019	Rangers		
2019–2022	Hibernian		
2022–	Glasgow City	62	(5)

International career^{‡}
2016–2017	Scotland U17	7	(0)
2017–2019	Scotland U19	17	(0)
2020–	Scotland	16	(0)
2022–	Scotland U23	5	(0)
- * Club domestic league appearances and goals as of 6 January 2025 ‡ National team caps and goals as of 15 October 2026

Amy Muir (born 7 March 2000) is a Scottish football defender who plays for Glasgow City in the Scottish Women's Premier League (SWPL) and the Scotland national team.

== Early life ==
Muir is from Gourock and was educated at Clydeview Academy.

== Club career ==
Muir started her career with Rangers. She moved to Hibernian in July 2019. On 9 June 2022 it was announced that she had signed for Glasgow City. Glasgow manager Eileen Gleeson said of the signing: "I’m delighted that Amy has chosen to join Glasgow City FC. She is an exciting young Scottish player with huge potential and great experience of the Scottish league. Beyond Amy’s capabilities as a player, she is a committed determined character which are key characteristics we look for in a person."

== International career ==
Muir represented Scotland at the under-17 and under-19 levels. She captained the under-19 team at the 2019 UEFA Women's Under-19 Championship, which Scotland hosted.

Muir was added to the full Scotland squad for the first time in August 2019 as an injury replacement, but she had to withdraw herself due to injury a day later. She made her full international debut at the 2020 Pinatar Cup, as she appeared as substitute in a 2–1 win against Northern Ireland on 10 March.
