= Rio Hardy (footballer) =

English footballer

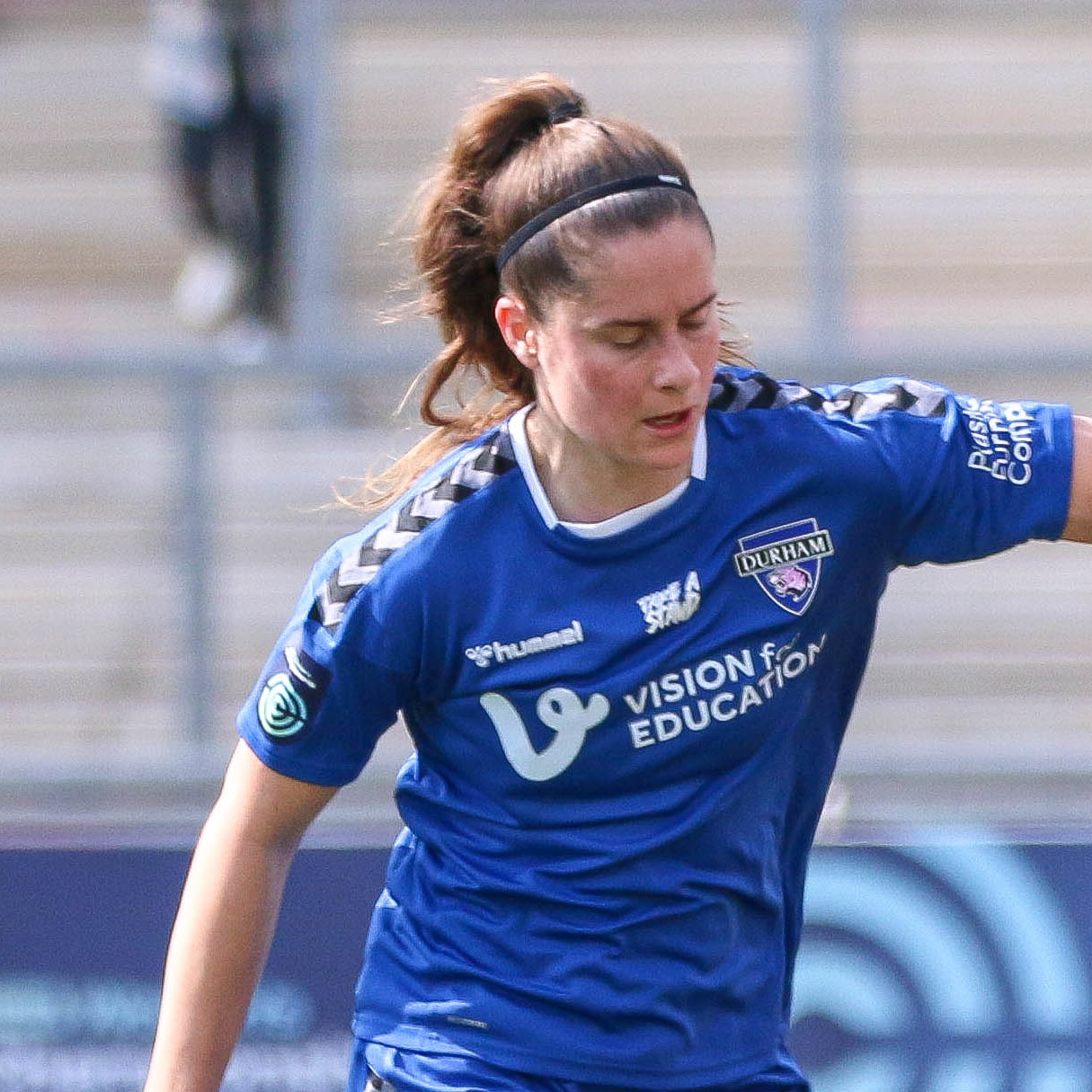
- Hardy playing for Durham in 2022

Personal information
- Date of birth: 29 June 1996 (age 30)
- Place of birth: Whitehaven, Cumbria, England
- Position: Forward

Team information
- Current team: Bristol City

College career
Years	Team	Apps	(Gls)
2014–2017	South Alabama Jaguars	88	(43)

Senior career*
Years	Team	Apps	(Gls)
2013–2014	Blackburn Rovers	9	(1)
2018	Grindavík	15	(10)
2019–2021	Apollon Ladies	40	(48)
2021	Coventry United	11	(5)
2022–2023	Durham Women	30	(8)
2023–2025	Rangers	53	(39)
2025–	Bristol City	8	(5)
- * Club domestic league appearances and goals as of 11:40, 13 November 2025 (UTC)

Rio Hardy (born 29 June 1996) is an English professional footballer who plays as a forward for Women's Super League 2 club Bristol City.

== Early life ==
Hardy grew up in Workington, England, and attended the Stainburn School in the town.

== Youth career ==
As a youth player, Hardy joined the youth academy of Seaton Girls, helping the club win the County Cup. After that, she joined the youth academy of English side Blackburn Rovers, helping the club reach the FA Youth Cup final, where they lost to the youth academy of English side Arsenal.

== College career ==
In 2014, Hardy joined the South Alabama Jaguars in the United States, where she was regarded as one of the team's most important players. She obtained a sports science degree. She previously attended college in Accrington, England.

== Club career ==
In 2018, Hardy signed for Icelandic side Grindavík, where she was regarded as one of the club's most important players. She helped them win the league and qualify for the UEFA Women's Champions League. In 2019, she signed for Cypriot side Apollon Ladies, where she captained the club and was regarded as one of their most important players. In 2021, she signed for English side Coventry United, where she was regarded as one of the club's most important goalscorers, but left due to their liquidation. In 2022, she trained with English side Aston Villa.

In 2023, she signed for Scottish side Rangers.

On 31 July 2025, it was announced that Hardy had been signed for an undisclosed fee from Rangers, joining Bristol City on a two-year contract.

== International career ==
Hardy played for England Colleges at international youth level.

== Personal life ==
Hardy is the twin sister of English footballer Steffi Hardy. She is a supporter of English Premier League side Manchester United. Her family has been based in Workington, England.
