= 2022–23 Scottish Women's Premier League Cup =

Tournament details
- Country: Scotland
- Teams: 16

Final positions
- Champions: Rangers
- Runners-up: Hibernian

Tournament statistics
- Matches played: 20

The 2022–23 Scottish Women's Premier League Cup was the 21st edition of the Scottish Women's Premier League's league cup competition, which began in 2002. It was sponsored by Sky Sports and officially known as the Sky Sports Scottish Women's Premier League Cup. The competition was contested by all 16 teams of the two divisions of the Scottish Women's Premier League (SWPL 1 and SWPL 2).

Celtic were the defending champions, but they were eliminated by Spartans at the quarter-final stage. Spartans were then beaten by Rangers, who went to win the trophy for the first time, beating Hibernian in the final.

== First round ==
The draw for the First round took place on 25 August 2022 at Hampden Park.

22 September 2022	Gartcairn	3–1	Boroughmuir Thistle	Airdrie
13:00	Boyce 48'; Robertson 51'; Brown 67'		Gibson 3' (pen.)	Stadium: MTC Park

22 September 2022	Kilmarnock	2–2 (a.e.t.) (5–4 p)	St Johnstone	Kilmarnock
14:00	Crooks 60'; McCance 105'		Steadman 83', 102'	Stadium: Rugby Park
	Penalties
	? (penalty scored); Crooks (penalty scored); ? (penalty scored); Robinson (penalty scored); Fyfe (penalty scored)		(penalty scored) Steedman; (penalty scored) ?; (penalty scored) Simson; (penalty scored) Robertson; (penalty missed) Moodie

22 September 2022	Montrose	1–4	Stirling University	Montrose
12:00	Ridgeway 20'		Varnava 62'; Kennedy 68'; Watson 78'; Taylor 88'	Stadium: Links Park

22 September 2022	Queen's Park	5–1	East Fife	Glasgow
13:00	Cairney 14'; Callaghan 24'; Tweedie 26'; Kane 29', 29', 42'		Skivington 3'	Stadium: New Tinto Park

== Second round ==
The draw for the First round took place on 20 September 2022 at Hampden Park.

2 October 2022	Glasgow City	5–0	Aberdeen	Glasgow
16:30	Chinchilla 31'; Davidson 62' (pen.), 82'; Whelan 73'; Moore 86'			Stadium: Petershill Park

2 October 2022	Hamilton Academical	0–8	Hibernian	Hamilton
16:00			Thomas 18', 31', 32'; Adams 50'; McGregor 72'; Freda 82', 83'; Livingstone 90'	Stadium: New Douglas Park

2 October 2022	Heart of Midlothian	1–1 (4–5 p)	Spartans	Edinburgh
15:00	McAlister 47'		Marshall 9'	Stadium: Oriam
	Penalties
	Grant (penalty scored); Timms (penalty missed); McAllister (penalty scored); Brownlie (penalty scored); Aitchison (penalty scored); Rood (penalty missed)		(penalty missed) Robinson; (penalty scored) Birse; (penalty scored) McQuillan; (penalty scored) McCafferty; (penalty scored) Douglas; (penalty scored) Mason

2 October 2022	Kilmarnock	2–0	Gartcairn	Kilmarnock
16:00	O’Brien 34'; Middleton 69' (pen.)			Stadium: Rugby Park

2 October 2022	Motherwell	2–1	Dundee United	Carluke
16:00	McDonald-Nguah (?); Inglis (?)		Harkin 49'	Stadium: John Cumming Stadium

2 October 2022	Partick Thistle	0–2	Celtic	Glasgow
12:45			Ashworth-Clifford 14'; Jacynta 26'	Stadium: Petershill Park

2 October 2022	Queen's Park	0–5	Rangers	Glasgow
15:00			Howat 6', 45'; McLeary 20'; McLean 59', 88'	Stadium: New Tinto Park

2 October 2022	Stirling University	1–2	Glasgow Women	Stirling
14:00	Taylor 6'		Boyes 60'; Cunningham 60'	Stadium: Stirling University

== Quarter-finals ==
The draw for the quarter-finals took place on 4 October 2022 at Hampden Park.

23 October 2022	Glasgow Women	0–9	Glasgow City	Glasgow
13:00			Whelan 13'; Davidson 19' (pen.), 65'; Clark 34', 82', 90'; Gibb 63', 80'; Martin 87'	Stadium: New Tinto Park

23 October 2022	Rangers	5–0	Motherwell	Cumbernauld
12:00	Watson 28'; Martinez 51', 68'; Kirsty Howat 54', 66'			Stadium: Broadwood Stadium

23 October 2022	Kilmarnock	0–8	Hibernian	Kilmarnock
16:00			Mustafa 4', 51'; Livingstone 15', 56'; Morrison 20'; Thomas (?); Freda 78'; Siobhan Hunter (?)	Stadium: Rugby Park

23 October 2022	Celtic	1–1 (2–4 p)	Spartans	Airdrie
14:00	Larisey 12'		Mason 90+2'	Stadium: Excelsior Stadium
	Penalties
	Robertson (penalty missed); Clark (penalty scored); Craig (penalty scored); Bowie (penalty missed)		(penalty scored) Clelland; (penalty scored) Birse; (penalty scored) McQuillan; (penalty scored) McCafferty

== Semi-finals ==
The draw for the semi-finals took place on 25 October 2022 at Tynecastle Park Edinburgh.

6 November 2022	Spartans	0–4	Rangers	Edinburgh
13.00			Cornet 7'; McCoy 37'; Danielsson 57'; Arnot 81'	Stadium: Ainslie Park

6 November 2022	Glasgow City	1–2	Hibernian	Glasgow
13.00	Fulton 84'		Freda 75', 28'	Stadium: Petershill Park

== Final ==
The venue for the final was announced on 25 October 2022.

11 December 2022
12.30

Rangers	2–0	Hibernian
Arnot 16'; Howat 76'	Report

Tynecastle Park, Edinburgh
Attendance: 3727
