= Boroughmuir Thistle F.C. =

Scottish Women's Football Club

- Full name: Boroughmuir Thistle Football Club
- Nickname(s): Thistle, BTFC, BT
- Founded: February 2007; 18 years ago
- Ground: Meggetland Sports Complex, Edinburgh
- Capacity: 1,000
- Chairperson: Gavin Michie
- League: SWPL 2
- 2023–24: 4th
- Website: https://sites.google.com/boroughmuirfc.com/main-btfc-club-site/home
Home colours	Away colours	Third colours

Boroughmuir Thistle Football Club is a Scottish women's association football club founded in south east Edinburgh in 2007. It is the largest girls and women's football club in Scotland and their first team compete in Scottish Women's Premier League 2.

The club has a long term partnership with Edinburgh University and Edinburgh University Women's football club. The club are based at various locations around Edinburgh including youth teams at Meggetland Sports Complex, Peffermill Sports Grounds, Meadowbank Stadium all facilities are in Edinburgh.

Boroughmuir have various youth teams from under 8 - to under 18 age groups. They also have National Academy Programme teams who played under Scottish Women's Football including under 14, under 16 and under 18 which is part of the Purple Pathway. These teams play some of the best club teams in Scotland. The "Purple Pathway" is the journey and development of players as they progress through the youth academy to adult football. The club has produced several players since it was founded who have played professional football and also played at college and university level.
