= Old Town Hall, Leith =

Municipal building in Leith, Scotland

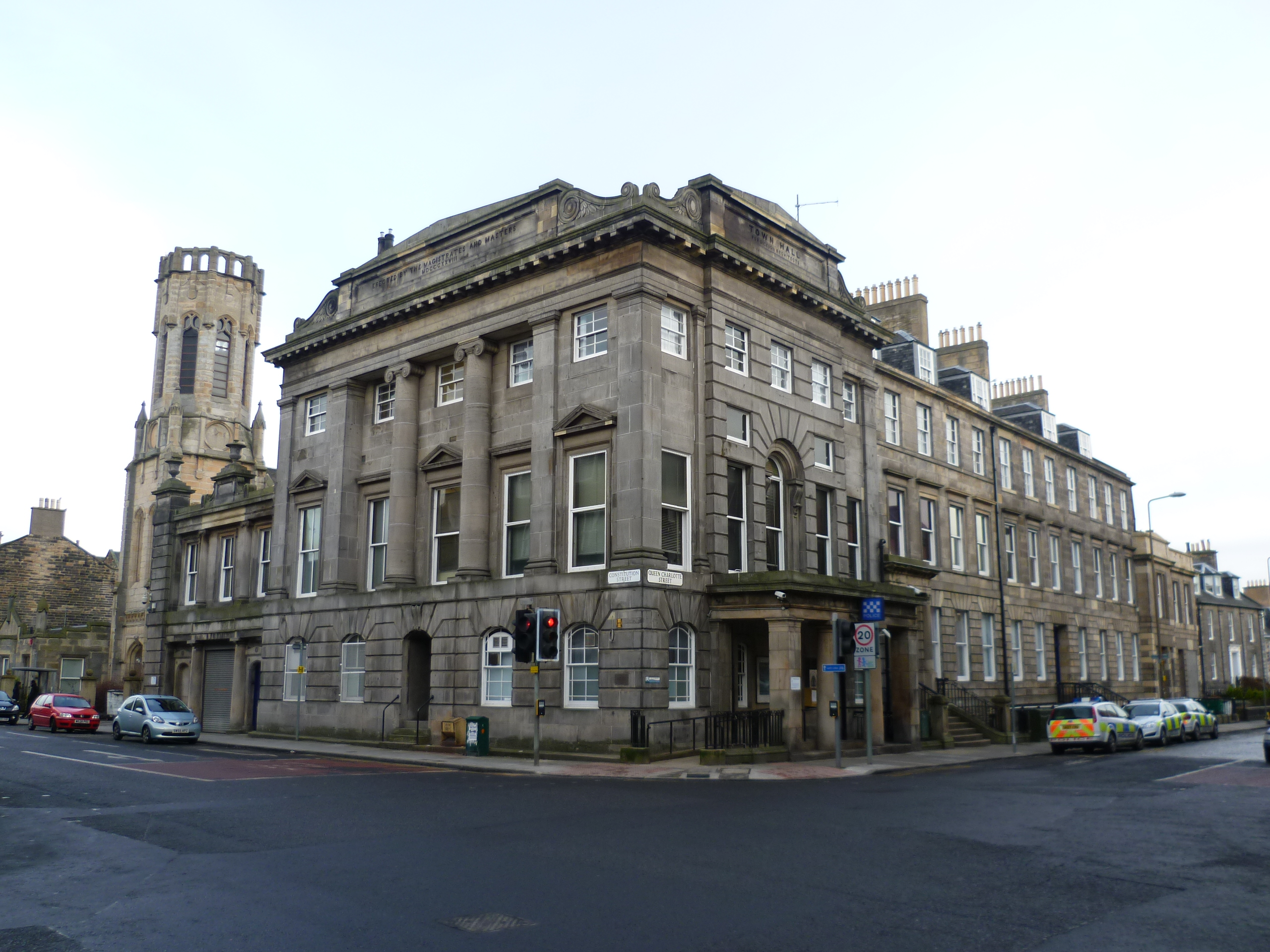
- Old Town Hall, Leith

- Shown in Edinburgh
- 55.9737°N 3.1676°W
- Location: Queen Charlotte Street, Leith

History
- Built: 1829

Site notes
- Architect: R & R Dickson
- Architectural style: Neoclassical style

Listed Building – Category A
- Official name: Police Station, 31-33 Queen Charlotte Street, Leith, Edinburgh
- Designated: 14 December 1970
- Reference no.: LB27857

The Old Town Hall is a municipal building in Queen Charlotte Street, Leith, Scotland. The old town hall, which was the meeting place of Leith Burgh Council, is now used as a police station. It is a Category A listed building.

== History ==
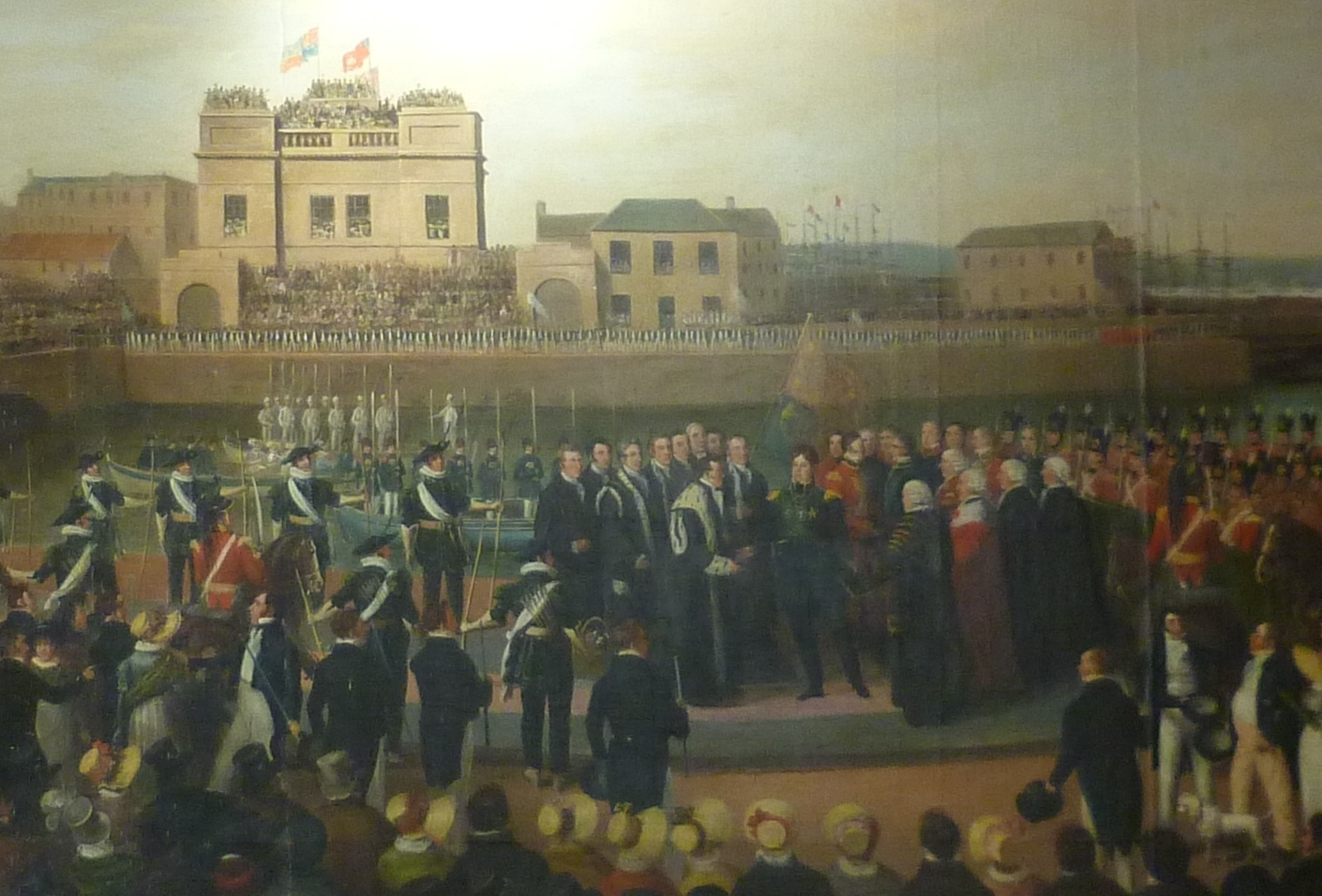
Detail from The Landing of George IVth at Leith by Alexander Carse, which remains hanging in the old town hall

The current building replaced a 16th-century tolbooth in Tolbooth Wynd which had become dilapidated and, despite objections from the author, Sir Walter Scott, and the antiquary, Charles Kirkpatrick Sharpe, was demolished in 1824. After significant industrial growth, particularly associated with the shipbuilding and repair facilities in the town, the Leith Police Act 1827 (7 & 8 Geo. 4. c. cxii), which provided for the "Municipal Government of the Town and Suburbs of the Town of Leith", was enacted in 1827. In this context, civic leaders decided to procure a new town hall: the site selected was on the corner of Queen Charlotte Street and Constitution Street, the latter being the main thoroughfare to Leith Docks.

The foundation stone for the new building was laid in March 1828. It was designed by R & R Dickson in the neoclassical style, built at a cost of £3,260 from ashlar stone brought from Craigleith Quarry and completed in spring 1829. The design involved a symmetrical main frontage with five bays facing onto Constitution Street; there was a small round door in the centre bay on the ground floor with small round headed windows in the other bays. The first floor featured tall sash windows and the second floor small square sash windows flanked by Ionic order columns (for the middle bays) and Doric order pilasters (for the outer bays) supporting a large entablature with a frieze inscribed "Erected by the Magistrates and Masters / MDCCCXXVIII". The Queen Charlotte Street elevation also involved five bays; the central section of three bays featured a Doric order porch on the ground floor, tall sash windows on the first floor and small square sash windows on the second floor with a large entablature a frieze inscribed "Town Hall / R & R Dickson Architects".

Internally, the principal rooms were the sheriffs' courtroom, to the north, and the council chamber to the south. A painting by Alexander Carse, depicting the arrival of King George IV at Leith Docks during his visit to Scotland in 1822, was hung in the new council chamber.

The town became an independent burgh in 1833 with the town hall as its headquarters. The town hall was extended to the east along Queen Charlotte Street by the acquisition and conversion of a section of terraced housing, to a design by James Simpson, in 1868. It was also extended to the north along Constitution Street by the construction of a two-storey section, also to a design by James Simpson, in 1878. This section is still intact as the town jail, containing eight cells at first floor, but ceased to be used for overnight prisoners in the 1990s. The council chamber was remodelled in 1878 and subsequently re-decorated by Thomas Bonnar in 1892.

The town hall ceased to be the local seat of government when the burgh of Leith was annexed by the City of Edinburgh in 1920. As a consolation the people of Leith were given a new theatre and library complex on Ferry Road, which for a while was referred to as the new town hall. Meanwhile, the old town hall was put to use as commercial offices until 1983 when it was converted for use as a police station.

== See also ==
- List of Category A listed buildings in Edinburgh
- List of listed buildings in Edinburgh/10
