= Ainslie Park =

Football stadium in Edinburgh, Scotland

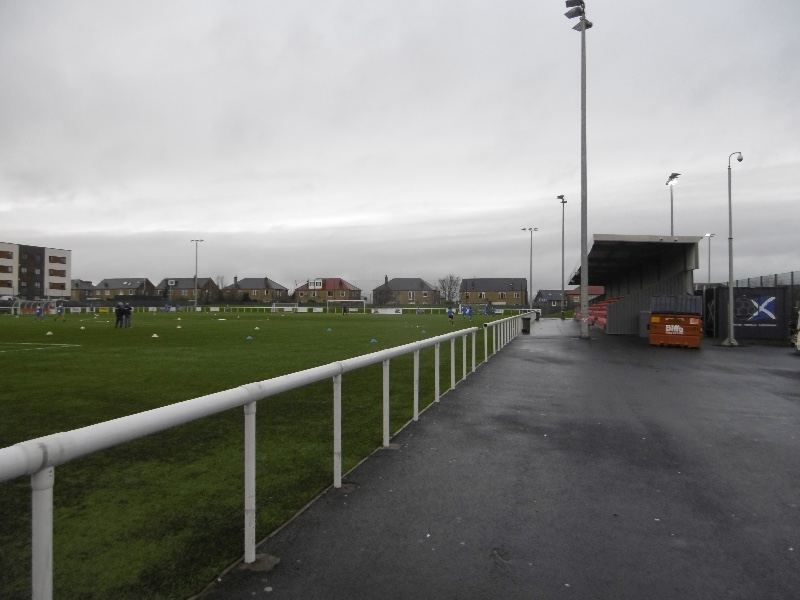

- Location in Edinburgh
- Location: Pilton Drive, Edinburgh, Scotland
- Coordinates: 55°58′18″N 3°14′0″W
- Capacity: 3,612 (534 seated)
- Surface: Artificial Turf

Construction
- Opened: 2008

Tenants
- Spartans F.C. Spartans W.F.C. Hibernian L.F.C. Edinburgh City Lothian Thistle Hutchison Vale F.C.: 2008–present 2008–present 2016–2021; 2017–2022; 2021–2022

Ainslie Park, also known as the Vanloq Community Stadium due to sponsorship, is a football stadium located in Edinburgh, Scotland. It is the home ground of Scottish League Two club Spartans and the club's women's team in the Scottish Women's Premier League (SWPL). In addition, Edinburgh City shared the ground between 2017 and 2022 during the redevelopment of Meadowbank Stadium, and Lothian Thistle Hutchison Vale also played there during the 2021–22 season. Another SWPL team, Hibernian, also previously played there from 2016 to 2021.

== History ==
Spartans F.C. had previously played at City Park, in the Crewe Toll area of Edinburgh, until moving to Ainslie Park in November 2008.

In March 2017, Edinburgh City reached an agreement with Spartans to use Ainslie Park for three seasons while Meadowbank Stadium is being redeveloped. Edinburgh City announced they would return to Meadowbank in 2021, but this was delayed by ongoing works, and they stayed at Ainslie Park for the 2021–22 season.

Hibernian Women played at the stadium for several seasons until 2021, when they relocated to Almondvale Stadium in Livingston, West Lothian.

East of Scotland Football League club Lothian Thistle Hutchison Vale moved all their men's first team matches to Ainslie Park for the 2021–22 season, due to problems with the pitch at their Saughton Enclosure ground.

Spartans announced in January 2025 that the ground would now be known as the Vanloq Community Stadium, due to a sponsorship agreement with Edinburgh-based recruitment company Vanloq.

== Facilities ==
Ainslie Park on Pilton Drive in north Edinburgh is the home ground of Spartans, part of their Community Football Academy. The new facility incorporates a fully enclosed stadium which meets SFA and SFL criteria, with an artificial pitch, floodlights, seating for 504 spectators and an overall capacity of 3,000. Another full size, floodlit artificial pitch sits adjacent to the main playing area and the accommodation incorporates six changing rooms, a club room, committee room and a physio room. The Club ground holds a PA system and a bar for spectators.

== Transport ==
Waverley and Haymarket, the main railway stations in Edinburgh, are both approximately 3 miles (4.8 km) from the stadium.

The nearby Ferry Road is served by Lothian Buses route numbers 21 and 27. Services 19, 29, 37 & 47 also run within 0.5 miles (0.8 km) of the stadium.

== See also ==
- Stadium relocations in Scottish football
