= Crewe Toll =

Area of Edinburgh, Scotland

Coordinates: 55°58′5.63″N 3°14′9.05″W

Crewe Toll is an area in Edinburgh, the Scottish capital.

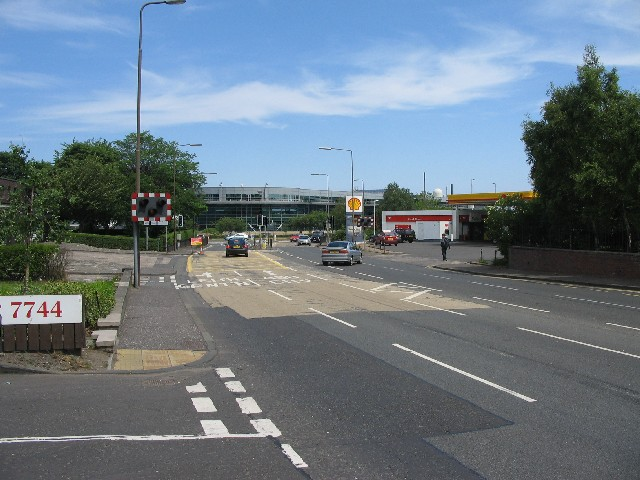
Looking towards Crewe Toll roundabout from Telford Road

The area takes its name from the Toll house which once stood at the junction of Ferry Road and Crewe Road North and South. The name Crewe, or a variation thereof (Creue, Crew or Crou), can be identified on maps as early as those from John Adair's 17th century survey, indicating that a farm stood southeast of the present Crewe Toll. "Toll" is shown on Gellatly's "New Map of the country 12 miles round Edinburgh" published in 1834. The 1853 and 1913 OS maps show a 'smithy' at the junction. All buildings on the junction disappeared when it was enlarged at some point in the 1920s to take the additional traffic from the newly-constructed Telford Road.

The Western General Hospital is in the vicinity. Another hospital, the Northern General, was also in the area but this is now the site of a Morrisons supermarket. Edinburgh's Telford College (tertiary) was at Crewe Toll, but has moved to a site at Granton. Fettes College (private, secondary) is close by. A major aerospace facility is situated in the area, the Leonardo S.p.A. facility that dates to a 1943 Ferranti factory originally set up to produce gyro gunsights for the Supermarine Spitfire that later became a major radar development site. The site changed hands repeatedly, from Ferranti to GEC-Ferranti, then GEC-Marconi, then BAE Systems, then SELEX Sensors and Airborne Systems, then SELEX Galileo and finally Leonardo.

The location was the site of a junction on the Caledonian Railway. This junction was spelled 'Crew' up until closure in the 1960s, long after the spelling 'Crewe' was settled as the area built up.

Some nearby Edinburgh districts include Craigleith, Pilton, Inverleith, and Silverknowes.
