= Craigleith, Edinburgh =

Area of Edinburgh, Scotland

Coordinates: 55°57′42″N 003°13′43″W

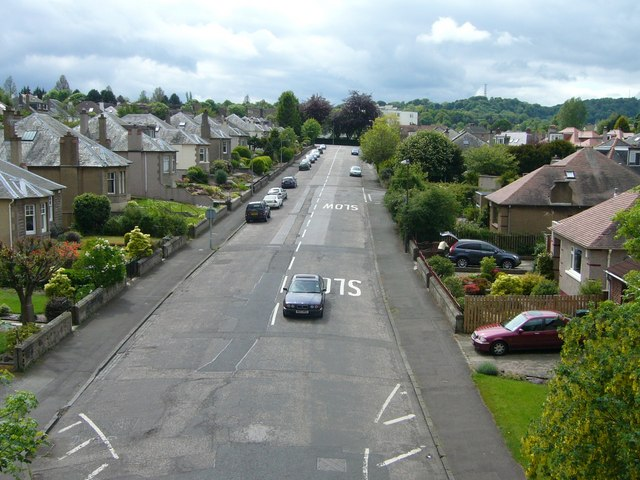
Craigleith Drive

Craigleith (Scottish Gaelic: Creag Lìte) is an area of west Edinburgh, Scotland. Its name comes from various forms of Craig of Inverleith, or rock or hill of Inverleith. The area lies between Ravelston Dykes, to Crewe Toll and the Ferry Road, and Comely Bank on the east. Queensferry Road and Craigleith Road both pass through here. There are also a number of private schools in the area such as Stewart's Melville College and The Mary Erskine School.

The Royal Victoria Hospital is off Craigleith Road while the Western General Hospital on Crewe Road was opened in 1868 as the Craigleith Hospital and Poorhouse.

== Quarrying ==
Craigleith Quarry was active for more than 300 years from 1615 to 1942. The 350-million-year-old Carboniferous Craigleith sandstone was used extensively in construction because it was a hard-wearing composite. Architects used it extensively in buildings in both Edinburgh's Old and New Town. Many famous buildings including Edinburgh Castle and Holyrood Palace were built from Craigleith sandstone. Because of its hardness, Craigleith Sandstone was also favoured for cutting stones used to make cut glass during the Victorian era.

At its peak, the quarry was the largest and most productive in Edinburgh. In 1995, the Craigleith Retail Park was built upon the infilled Craigleith Quarry; it is situated at the junction of Queensferry Road and Craigleith Road.
