= Pilton, Edinburgh =

Suburb of Edinburgh, Scotland

Coordinates: 55°58′20″N 3°14′12″W

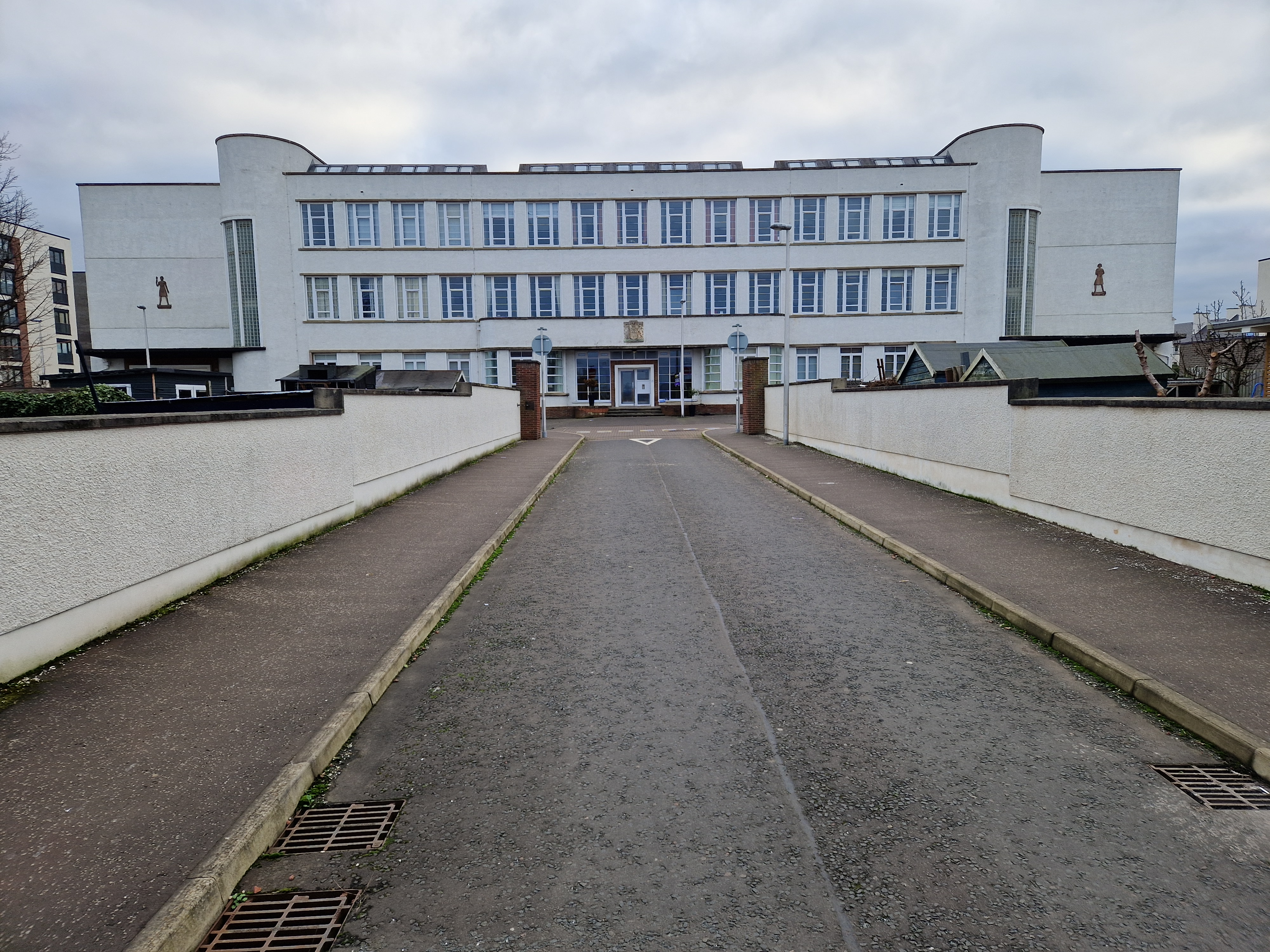
Remains of Ainslie Park High School where Irvine Welsh went to school

Pilton is a residential area of northern Edinburgh, Scotland. It is to the north of Ferry Road, immediately east of Muirhouse, and to the west and south of Granton (the Boswall, Royston Mains and Wardieburn neighbourhoods).

== Description ==
Sometimes considered to be part of the larger neighbouring area of Granton, Pilton consists of two housing schemes - West Pilton and East Pilton. These neighbourhoods, particularly West Pilton, are regarded as among the most economically deprived areas in Edinburgh and suffer from extreme crime rates and anti-social behaviour especially young joyriders stealing items such as electronics, money, groceries, garden items,motorbikes and cars. For other illegal acts locals cars are often damaged or local stray animals are often abused.

Most of West Pilton was social housing constructed by the council between the 1930s and 1960s (with a hiatus during the Second World War) but now these properties are largely privately owned. The housing mostly takes the form of maisonettes and three storey blocks of flats. There are also two 1960s ten-storey tower blocks (Inchcolm Court and Inchgarvie Court) and one with 16 storeys (Northview Court). In addition, new housing developments have been built by the private sector and the area is currently undergoing revitalisation. There are local shops and community services.

Built on the lands of East Pilton Farm in the 1930s by Glasgow-based builder Mactaggart & Mickel to a street layout by the Edinburgh City Architect Ebenezer James MacRae, the streets of East Pilton mainly take various names beginning Crewe or Pilton. The original estate comprises mostly four-in-a-block flatted villas similar to those by the same builder at Carrick Knowe, Colinton Mains and elsewhere in the city as well as in several districts of Glasgow. Streets in a new development on the site of the demolished Bruce Peebles & Co. Ltd. engineering works (destroyed by fire in 1999) take the East Pilton Farm name.

== Sport ==
Spartans F.C. are based in the area, playing off Pilton Drive at Ainslie Park since 2008; a public leisure centre of the same name is immediately adjacent to the ground. Their previous home City Park was two blocks to the south-east – housing now occupies the site.

== Demographics ==
Ethnicity	Pilton (Forth Ward)	Edinburgh
White	84.6%	84.9%
Asian	7.1%	8.6%
Black	3.6%	2.1%
Mixed	2.0%	2.5%
Other	2.7%	1.9%
