= List of listed buildings in Edinburgh/10 =

This is a list of listed buildings in Edinburgh, Scotland.

== List ==
Name	Location	Date Listed	Grid Ref. (Note: Sometimes known as OSGB36, the grid reference (where provided) is based on the British national grid reference system used by the Ordnance Survey. • "Guide to National Grid". Ordnance Survey. • "Get-a-map". Ordnance Survey.)	Geo-coordinates	Notes	LB Number (Note: Historic Environment Scotland assign a unique alphanumeric identifier to each designated site in Scotland, for listed buildings this always begins with "LB", for example "LB12345".)	Image
12 Duncan Street, Former Geographical Institute, Including Boundary Wall				55°56′07″N 3°10′38″W	Category B	28701	Upload another image
3-7 (Odd Nos) Dundas Street, Including Railings				55°57′23″N 3°11′54″W	Category B	28702	Upload Photo
25-29 (Odd Nos) Dundas Street, Including Railings				55°57′26″N 3°11′56″W	Category B	28707	Upload Photo
31-37 (Odd Nos) Dundas Street, Including Railings				55°57′27″N 3°11′57″W	Category B	28708	Upload Photo
67-77 (Odd Nos) Dundas Street And 35-37(Odd Nos) Cumberland Street, Including Railings				55°57′31″N 3°11′59″W	Category A	28710	Upload Photo
87-97A (Odd Nos) Dundas Street, Including Railings				55°57′33″N 3°12′00″W	Category B	28712	Upload Photo
30-36 (Even Nos) Dundas Street, Including Railings				55°57′26″N 3°11′59″W	Category B	28718	Upload Photo
1-10 (Inclusive Nos) Douglas Crescent, Including Railings				55°56′56″N 3°13′19″W	Category B	28653	Upload Photo
11-13 (Inclusive Nos) Douglas Crescent, Including Railings				55°56′57″N 3°13′18″W	Category B	28654	Upload Photo
22 Douglas Crescent, Including Railings				55°56′59″N 3°13′14″W	Category B	28656	Upload Photo
23-31 (Inclusive Nos) Douglas Crescent, Including Railings				55°56′59″N 3°13′14″W	Category B	28657	Upload Photo
1, 2, 3, 4, 5 Douglas Gardens, Including Railings				55°57′03″N 3°13′13″W	Category B	28658	Upload Photo
Gilmerton 36 Drum Street, The Mechanic Arms				55°54′19″N 3°07′56″W	Category C(S)	28664	Upload Photo
11-15 (Inclusive Nos) Drummond Place Including Railings And Lamps				55°57′28″N 3°11′48″W	Category A	28666	Upload Photo
16-20 (Inclusive Nos) Drummond Place Including Lamps And Railings				55°57′31″N 3°11′49″W	Category A	28667	Upload Photo
31-36A (Inclusive Nos) Drummond Place, And 1- 3A (Odd Nos) Scotland Street And 2 And 4 London Street, Including Railings And Lamps				55°57′33″N 3°11′38″W	Category A	28669	Upload Photo
1, 2, 3 ,4 And 5 Cramond Village				55°58′46″N 3°18′03″W	Category B	28604	Upload Photo
64-70B Cumberland Street, Including Railings				55°57′30″N 3°12′10″W	Category B	28615	Upload Photo
62 Dalkeith Road, Blacket Place Lodge, Including Gatepiers To Blacket Place				55°56′16″N 3°10′20″W	Category B	28623	Upload Photo
2-10 (Even Numbers) Dean Path				55°57′10″N 3°13′04″W	Category B	28638	Upload Photo
12-22 (Consecutive Numbers) Coates Crescent, 12 And 2 Walker Street, 22 And 1 Manor Place, Including Railings				55°56′55″N 3°12′47″W	Category A	28564	Upload another image
5 And 7 Cockburn Street				55°57′03″N 3°11′28″W	Category B	28570	Upload Photo
11 And 13 Cockburn Street				55°57′03″N 3°11′26″W	Category B	28572	Upload Photo
41 And 43 Corstorphine Road, Including Boundary Walls				55°56′43″N 3°14′34″W	Category C(S)	28588	Upload Photo
2-12 (Even Nos) Cowgate, Greyfriars Hostel				55°56′53″N 3°11′37″W	Category B	28597	Upload Photo
1-41 (Odd Nos) East Claremont Street				55°57′41″N 3°11′35″W	Category A	28533	Upload Photo
Clarence Street 27-29A And 95-97A St Stephen Street				55°57′32″N 3°12′19″W	Category B	28538	Upload Photo
Clarence Street 2-2B And 90-94 Hamilton Place				55°57′34″N 3°12′24″W	Category B	28539	Upload Photo
51-77 Clerk Street South				55°56′22″N 3°10′46″W	Category B	28553	Upload another image
Clerk Street South 2-10				55°56′27″N 3°10′53″W	Category B	28554	Upload Photo
25 Castle Terrace And 17 Cornwall Street, Including Boundary Wall And Railings				55°56′50″N 3°12′12″W	Category A	28485	Upload another image
537 And 539 Castlehill, Jollie's Close, Semple's Close And Sempill House (Part)				55°56′57″N 3°11′44″W	Category B	28486	Upload another image
356 Castlehill And 2 Castle Wynd North, Cannonball House				55°56′56″N 3°11′46″W	Category A	28491	Upload another image
8-10 The Causeway, Duddingston, (Prince Charlie's House)				55°56′33″N 3°08′43″W	Category B	28492	Upload Photo
1-11 (Inclusive Nos) Charlotte Square With Railings, Lamp Standards And Boundary Walls				55°57′09″N 3°12′28″W	Category A	28502	Upload another image
2-22 (Even Numbers) Chester Street, 30 Walker Street, Including Railings				55°57′00″N 3°12′56″W	Category B	28519	Upload Photo
23-33 (Odd Nos) Canongate And 1-12 (Inclusive) White Horse Close				55°57′11″N 3°10′32″W	Category B	28427	Upload another image
129 Canongate, Panmure Close Cadell House				55°57′07″N 3°10′43″W	Category B	28432	Upload Photo
183-187 (Odd Nos) Canongate, 'Bible Land'				55°57′05″N 3°10′51″W	Category B	28434	Upload another image
191 (Flats 1, 3 And 5) And 193 Canongate				55°57′05″N 3°10′52″W	Category C(S)	28436	Upload Photo
86 Canongate, Canongate Primary School Including Janitor's House, Gates, Gatepiers And Boundary Walls				55°57′06″N 3°10′38″W	Category B	28442	Upload another image
23 St John Street, Lodge Canongate Kilwinning				55°57′03″N 3°10′54″W	Category B	28453	Upload another image
9-13 (Odd Nos) And 13A Castle Street With Railings				55°57′06″N 3°12′10″W	Category B	28461	Upload Photo
45, 45A, 47, 49 And 49A North Castle Street With Railings				55°57′11″N 3°12′12″W	Category A	28465	Upload Photo
48-52 (Even Nos) North Castle Street With Railings And Block Facing Young Street Lane North				55°57′12″N 3°12′16″W	Category A	28478	Upload Photo
1-3 (Inclusive Nos) Brunton Place				55°57′28″N 3°10′29″W	Category B	28373	Upload Photo
Buccleuch Place 1-3 And 30-34 Buccleuch Street				55°56′34″N 3°11′06″W	Category B	28379	Upload Photo
Buccleuch Place 9, 10, 11				55°56′34″N 3°11′11″W	Category B	28384	Upload Photo
Buccleuch Place 20, 21				55°56′33″N 3°11′15″W	Category B	28388	Upload Photo
93-97 Buccleuch Street				55°56′31″N 3°11′02″W	Category C(S)	28395	Upload Photo
130 Buccleuch Street, Hope Park End				55°56′28″N 3°11′00″W	Category B	28404	Upload another image
39-43 (Odd Nos) Candlemaker Row				55°56′51″N 3°11′33″W	Category B	28414	Upload another image
30-34 (Even Nos) Candlemaker Row, Greyfriars' Bobby's Bar				55°56′49″N 3°11′30″W	Category B	28415	Upload another image
36-42 (Even Nos) Candlemaker Row, Including Candlemakers' Hall				55°56′49″N 3°11′30″W	Category A	28416	Upload Photo
20 Blacket Place, Including Boundary Walls				55°56′14″N 3°10′30″W	Category B	28313	Upload Photo
8-18 (Even Nos) Blackfriars Street				55°56′59″N 3°11′10″W	Category B	28320	Upload Photo
1-7 (Odd Nos) Blair Street				55°56′58″N 3°11′17″W	Category B	28329	Upload Photo
27-31 (Odd Nos) Blair Street (Former Stationary Works)				55°56′56″N 3°11′16″W	Category B	28332	Upload Photo
Brandon Street, Dundas House (1883 Frontage To Brandon Street Only, Modern Offices To Rear Excluded)				55°57′41″N 3°12′07″W	Category B	28342	Upload Photo
Brandon Terrace 1-10				55°57′44″N 3°12′00″W	Category C(S)	28343	Upload Photo
7-33 (Odd Nos) Bread Street				55°56′46″N 3°12′18″W	Category C(S)	28345	Upload Photo
65-71 (Odd Nos) Broughton Street				55°57′29″N 3°11′21″W	Category B	28364	Upload Photo
24 Broughton Street (Former Catholic Apostolic Church), Including Railings And Gate				55°57′26″N 3°11′20″W	Category B	28368	Upload Photo
The Vennel, 2, 4 And 5 Brown's Place, Including Boundary Walls, Railings And Gate				55°56′47″N 3°11′49″W	Category B	28370	Upload Photo
1-19 (Inclusive Nos) Barclay Place				55°56′25″N 3°12′14″W	Category B	28268	Upload Photo
1 Easter Park House, Easter Park Drive				55°58′06″N 3°16′54″W	Category B	28274	Upload Photo
11-15 (Inclusive Numbers) Belgrave Place				55°57′15″N 3°13′10″W	Category C(S)	28284	Upload Photo
13-19 (Odd Nos) Bellevue Place Including Boundary Walls And Railings				55°57′38″N 3°11′31″W	Category B	28289	Upload Photo
4-11A (Inclusive Nos) Bellevue Terrace				55°57′41″N 3°11′36″W	Category A	28292	Upload Photo
7 And 7A Blacket Place, Including Gatepiers And Boundary Walls				55°56′13″N 3°10′26″W	Category B	28299	Upload Photo
9 And 11 Blacket Place, Including Boundary Walls				55°56′13″N 3°10′29″W	Category B	28300	Upload Photo
19 Blacket Place, Including Boundary Walls				55°56′09″N 3°10′25″W	Category B	28304	Upload Photo
21 And 21B Blacket Place, Including Boundary Walls				55°56′09″N 3°10′25″W	Category B	28305	Upload Photo
2 Blacket Place, Including Boundary Walls				55°56′16″N 3°10′23″W	Category B	28307	Upload Photo
5-25 (Odd Numbers) Alva Street, Including Railings				55°57′02″N 3°12′36″W	Category A	28236	Upload Photo
Ann Street 3-13				55°57′24″N 3°12′50″W	Category A	28241	Upload another image
Ann Street 15-41				55°57′22″N 3°12′48″W	Category A	28242	Upload Photo
5-9 (Odd Nos) Annandale Street Including Railings				55°57′35″N 3°11′03″W	Category A	28253	Upload Photo
11 Bank Street, Bank Of Scotland With Retaining Wall, Gatepiers, Gates, Railings And Lamp Standards				55°57′01″N 3°11′35″W	Category A	28263	Upload another image See more images
24 Dean Path And West Mill Lane, West Mill				55°57′09″N 3°13′01″W	Category B	28206	Upload Photo
1 And 1A Abercromby Place, And 20-24 (Even Nos) Dublin Street Including Railings And Lamp				55°57′24″N 3°11′37″W	Category B	28209	Upload Photo
21-25A (Inclusive Nos) Ainslie Place, Including Railings And Lamps				55°57′12″N 3°12′33″W	Category A	28215	Upload another image
Airlie Place 1-5 Brandon Street				55°57′39″N 3°12′06″W	Category C(S)	28216	Upload Photo
11-19 (Odd Nos) Albany Street, Including Railings				55°57′25″N 3°11′31″W	Category A	28221	Upload Photo
21-23A (Odd Nos) Albany Street, Including Railings				55°57′25″N 3°11′29″W	Category A	28222	Upload Photo
35, 37 Albany Street And 3 York Lane, Including Railings				55°57′25″N 3°11′25″W	Category B	28225	Upload Photo
39-43 (Odd Nos) Albany Street, Including Railings				55°57′26″N 3°11′23″W	Category A	28226	Upload Photo
2 And 4 Albany Street, And 27-33A (Odd Nos) Dublin Street, Including Railings				55°57′26″N 3°11′36″W	Category B	28227	Upload Photo
Redhall Gardens Craiglockhart Drive South (Now Entered From Lanark Road)				55°55′14″N 3°15′03″W	Category B	28119	Upload Photo
25 Spylaw Street, Spylaw House				55°54′25″N 3°15′37″W	Category B	28124	Upload Photo
Woodhall House-Sundials And Garden Wall Woodhall Road				55°54′05″N 3°17′07″W	Category B	28131	Upload Photo
2 Dovecot Road, Dovecot Including Boundary Walls, Gatepiers And Gates				55°56′20″N 3°16′53″W	Category A	28135	Upload another image
Buriehouse Mains Farmhouse And Steading				55°53′40″N 3°09′30″W	Category B	28160	Upload Photo
265 Braid Road, Buckstane Farmhouse, Including Boundary Walls And Well				55°54′37″N 3°12′32″W	Category B	28161	Upload Photo
Liberton Drive, Old White Cottage				55°54′51″N 3°10′38″W	Category C(S)	28186	Upload Photo
108 Swanston Road, Swanston Cottage, 108 Swanston Road, Swanston Cottage, Including Boundary Wall, Garden Terrace, Stone Trough And Ancillary Structure				55°53′42″N 3°13′17″W	Category B	28201	Upload Photo
West Shore Road, Gatepiers To North East Of Caroline Park House				55°58′58″N 3°14′23″W	Category B	28041	Upload Photo
62-68 (Even Nos) Camus Avenue, Comiston House				55°54′21″N 3°12′57″W	Category B	28044	Upload another image
Gilmerton, The Drum, Stables				55°54′26″N 3°07′10″W	Category B	28054	Upload Photo
Old Dalkeith Road, The Drum, Drumbank With Stables, Cottages (Outbuildings) And Walled Garden				55°54′44″N 3°06′58″W	Category B	28059	Upload Photo
Gracemount Off Lasswade Road				55°54′19″N 3°09′26″W	Category B	28076	Upload Photo
Liberton Drive, Liberton House, With Walled Garden, Gates And Gatepiers				55°54′41″N 3°10′22″W	Category A	28086	Upload Photo
Frogston Road East, Mortonhall House, Icehouse				55°54′11″N 3°11′02″W	Category C(S)	28098	Upload Photo
66 Murrayfield Avenue And Succoth Avenue, Murrayfield House, Including Wing				55°56′57″N 3°14′25″W	Category A	28100	Upload another image
Drummond Street, Gatepiers And Flanking Walls, University Of Edinburgh				55°56′53″N 3°11′01″W	Category B	28001	Upload Photo
High School Yards, Old Surgeon's Hall				55°56′55″N 3°10′59″W	Category B	28003	Upload Photo
Craigcrook Castle Craigcrook Road				55°57′18″N 3°15′57″W	Category B	28014	Upload Photo
Holyroodhouse, Palace Coach House				55°57′08″N 3°10′24″W	Category B	28026	Upload another image
Cameron House Avenue, Cameron House				55°55′51″N 3°09′37″W	Category B	28036	Upload Photo
Regent Road, Calton Old Burial Ground And Monuments, Including Screen Walls To Waterloo Place				55°57′15″N 3°11′10″W	Category A	27920	Upload another image See more images
Dean Path, Queensferry Road, Dean Cemetery Including Gate Lodge, Boundary Walls And Gates				55°57′03″N 3°13′22″W	Category A	27924	Upload another image See more images
Melville Drive, West Meadows Park, Masons' Pillars				55°56′31″N 3°12′01″W	Category B	27929	Upload another image
31 East Preston Street And Dalkeith Road, Newington Old Burial Ground, Including Boundary Walls And Watchtower				55°56′20″N 3°10′33″W	Category B	27934	Upload Photo
Roseburn Terrace And Coltbridge Avenue, Roseburn Old Bridge (Old Colt Bridge), Over Water Of Leith				55°56′46″N 3°14′08″W	Category B	27947	Upload Photo
Bell's Brae And Dean Path, Water Of Leith Bridge				55°57′08″N 3°13′00″W	Category B	27952	Upload Photo
Newhaven Harbour				55°58′53″N 3°11′49″W	Category B	27956	Upload another image
Rosebery Crescent, St Mary's Music School, Formerly Coates Hall (Scottish Episcopal Church Theological College), Including Gate House, Chapel Gates, Gatepiers And Railings				55°56′49″N 3°13′13″W	Category B	27966	Upload Photo
Warriston House And Boundary Wall				55°54′20″N 3°20′31″W	Category B	27830	Upload Photo
36 Newhaven Road				55°58′13″N 3°11′10″W	Category C(S)	27831	Upload Photo
West Hermiston Road, Trefoil Centre, East Lodge And Boundary Wall				55°55′19″N 3°19′54″W	Category B	27833	Upload Photo
7 And 9 Pilrig Street With Boundary Wall And Railings				55°57′53″N 3°10′44″W	Category B	27846	Upload Photo
George Street And Castle Street, Statue Of Dr Chalmers				55°57′09″N 3°12′13″W	Category A	27847	Upload another image See more images
29-41 (Odd Nos) Queen Charlotte Street, Leith Police Station, Former Town Hall And Railings				55°58′25″N 3°10′03″W	Category A	27857	Upload another image
3 Shore				55°58′39″N 3°10′08″W	Category B	27886	Upload Photo
36 And 37 Shore And 59-61 (Odd Nos) Bernard Street				55°58′34″N 3°10′10″W	Category A	27890	Upload Photo
High Street, The Lawnmarket Wellhead (At Lothian Chambers)				55°56′58″N 3°11′32″W	Category B	27903	Upload another image
Ratho Village, 45 Main Street And Boundary Wall				55°55′20″N 3°22′45″W	Category C(S)	27737	Upload Photo
Observatory Road, Blackford Hill, The Royal Observatory				55°55′23″N 3°11′16″W	Category A	27740	Upload Photo
308 And 312 Leith Walk				55°57′55″N 3°10′37″W	Category C(S)	27743	Upload Photo
77A Princes Street, Royal Scottish Academy				55°57′07″N 3°11′47″W	Category A	27744	Upload another image
1 West Brighton Crescent				55°57′04″N 3°07′07″W	Category B	27746	Upload Photo
318, 320 And 322 Leith Walk With Boundary Wall				55°57′54″N 3°10′38″W	Category C(S)	27751	Upload Photo
5 West Brighton Crescent				55°57′04″N 3°07′08″W	Category B	27754	Upload Photo
324 And 326 Leith Walk With Boundary Wall				55°57′53″N 3°10′38″W	Category B	27755	Upload Photo
Stockbridge Market St Stephen Place				55°57′29″N 3°12′27″W	Category B	27768	Upload Photo
Ratho Village, 52 Main Street				55°55′19″N 3°22′48″W	Category C(S)	27769	Upload Photo
5-9 (Inclusive Nos) Links Place				55°58′23″N 3°09′51″W	Category C(S)	27776	Upload Photo
4 West Brighton Crescent				55°57′05″N 3°07′06″W	Category B	27778	Upload Photo
14 And 15 Links Place Former Scottish Wholesale Co-Operative Society Building				55°58′22″N 3°09′48″W	Category B	27783	Upload Photo
18-20 (Inclusive Nos) Maritime Lane And 40, 41 Maritime Street				55°58′29″N 3°10′06″W	Category C(S)	27787	Upload Photo
Swineburn Road, Carmelhill				55°57′59″N 3°25′51″W	Category C(S)	27789	Upload Photo
Union Canal, Almond Aqueduct, River Almond At Lin's Mill				55°55′13″N 3°26′02″W	Category A	27793	Upload another image See more images
21 And 22 Wilson's Park				55°57′16″N 3°06′45″W	Category C(S)	27794	Upload Photo
Corstorphine Hill, Clermiston Tower (Scott Centenary Memorial)				55°57′04″N 3°16′20″W	Category B	27805	Upload another image
4, 6A And 6B Mill Lane With Gatepiers And Railings				55°58′29″N 3°10′34″W	Category C(S)	27819	Upload Photo
9 Mill Lane, Guru Nanak Gurdawara Singh Sabha Sikh Temple And Manse, Former St Thomas Church (C Of S), With Railings				55°58′29″N 3°10′33″W	Category B	27825	Upload another image
2 Leven Street, King's Theatre				55°56′31″N 3°12′10″W	Category A	27656	Upload another image
Ratho Park Dovecot				55°55′26″N 3°21′35″W	Category B	27665	Upload Photo
56 And 58 Fountainbridge, Former Meat Market				55°56′40″N 3°12′24″W	Category B	27669	Upload another image
34, 36 And 38 Leith Walk With Boundary Walls And Railings				55°58′12″N 3°10′22″W	Category B	27672	Upload Photo

== Key ==
The scheme for classifying buildings in Scotland is:

- Category A: "buildings of national or international importance, either architectural or historic; or fine, little-altered examples of some particular period, style or building type."
- Category B: "buildings of regional or more than local importance; or major examples of some particular period, style or building type, which may have been altered."
- Category C: "buildings of local importance; lesser examples of any period, style, or building type, as originally constructed or moderately altered; and simple traditional buildings which group well with other listed buildings."

In March 2016 there were 47,288 listed buildings in Scotland. Of these, 8% were Category A, and 50% were Category B, with the remaining 42% being Category C.

== See also ==
- List of listed buildings in Edinburgh
