= Thomas Morton (shipwright) =

Scottish shipwright

- Born: 8 October 1781
- Died: 24 December 1832 (aged 51)
- Occupation: Shipwright
- Known for: Patent slip

Thomas Morton (8 October 1781 – 24 December 1832) was a Scottish shipwright and inventor. His most widely known invention is the patent slip.

== Biography ==
Morton was born in Leith in October 1781 and grew up to become a shipwright like his father, Hugh. After spending some time working for his father, Morton went on to form his own shipbuilding company in the borough which later became S. & H. Morton & Co.

Unable to afford the installation of a dry dock in his Leith shipyards, Morton "resorted to the process of hauling up [ships] on greased ways". As this method was both dangerous and time-consuming, in 1818 he invented and installed the first patent slip; a slipway with cradle to haul ships out of the water. This was installed on the Water of Leith in front of his premises on Cooper Street in Leith. He was granted a patent for the invention the following year. In 1824 Morton sued John Barclay in Edinburgh for patent infringement after he had installed a similar design in the yards of his company, Stobcross, three years before. Barclay's version was described as a poor copy by fellow shipwright William Denny, and the court found in favour of Morton.

Despite the popularity of the invention, Morton did not profit from it for the first six years of the patent. A total of 45 slips were built (in Scotland, England, Ireland, Russia and the United States), earning the shipwright a total profit of £5737, before he applied for an extension to the patent in 1832. The extension was denied and instead a House of Commons select committee awarded Morton the sum of £2500.

In his later life he is listed as living at 1 Pilrig Place, a Georgian house on Leith Walk.

Morton died in December 1832 and is interred in South Leith Parish Churchyard . His company, S. & H. Morton & Co. continued operating.

== Family ==
His son Hugh Morton (1812-1878) continued the family business but moved the main premises from Cooper St/ Coburg St to Leith Walk on a site later used as a tram depot, attaching his house at 3 Smiths Place.

== Memorials ==
Thomas Morton Hall, a performance hall holding up to 400 persons and sharing the Leith Town Hall with the Leith Theatre, is named after him. It was built in 1925.

== Ships built by S. & H. Morton & Co. ==
- Wendouree, launched in 1882 and wreck in Australia in 1898.
- Tom Morton, launched in 1872 for Christian Salvesen; it was lost at sea in 1886.
