= Leith Theatre =

Theatre in Edinburgh, Scotland, 1932–1988

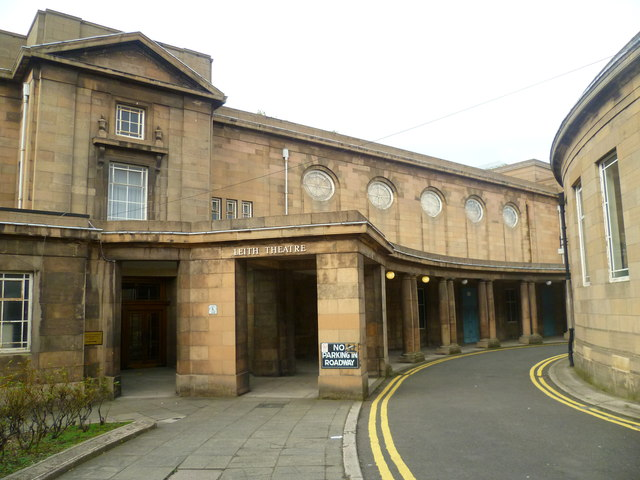
- Leith Theatre in 2011.

General information
- Location: 28-30 Ferry Road, Edinburgh, Scotland
- Coordinates: 55°58′33″N 3°10′49″W
- Grid reference: NT264764
- Current tenants: Leith Theatre Trust
- Construction started: 1929
- Completed: 1932
- Opened: 1932
- Client: Edinburgh Corporation
- Owner: City of Edinburgh Council

Technical details
- Material: Sandstone

Design and construction
- Architect: Bradshaw Gass & Hope

Renovating team
- Architect: Holmes Miller
- Structural engineer: Narro Associates
- Services engineer: Hawthorne Boyle
- Quantity surveyor: Doig & Smith

Listed Building – Category B
- Official name: 28-30 Ferry Road
- Designated: 29 April 1977
- Reference no.: LB27009

Leith Theatre (also known as Leith Town Hall and alternatively, in 1975 and 1976, Citadel Theatre) is a theatre located on Ferry Road in Edinburgh, Scotland. It opened in 1932 and ceased operation in 1988, partially reopening in 2016.

== History ==
=== Construction ===
Leith Theatre was a gift from the people of Edinburgh to the people of Leith following the merger of the burgh of Leith into the larger city in 1920. It occupies the site of the former North Leith Manse.

Leith Theatre was designed by Bolton-based practice Bradshaw Gass & Hope. Construction started in 1929 and the Theatre opened in 1932.

The Town Hall building, which houses the Leith Theatre in its East Wing and the Thomas Morton Hall (named after the shipwright, Thomas Morton) in its West Wing, stands adjacent to the Leith Library.

=== Operation ===
In 1941, Leith Theatre was badly damaged by bombing as part of the Second World War and remained closed until 1961.

The theatre was first used by the Edinburgh International Festival in 1961 for a ceilidh, and from the following year it became the second music venue of the festival, after the Usher Hall.

Between 1962 and the end of the 1970s a long series of musicians performed in the theatre including groups like the Amadeus Quartet, Borodin Quartet, the English Chamber Orchestra, and Schola Cantorum Basiliensis, and singers Janet Baker, Teresa Berganza, Dietrich Fischer-Dieskau, Jessye Norman, Peter Pears, Hermann Prey, Irmgard Seefried, and Galina Vishnevskaya. Instrumentalists included Larry Adler, Daniel Barenboim, Alfred Brendel, Benjamin Britten, Julian Bream, Rudolf Firkušný, Annie Fischer, Pierre Fournier, Szymon Goldberg, Leonid Kogan, Radu Lupu, Nikita Magaloff, Jacqueline du Pré, Mstislav Rostropovich, and Rosalyn Tureck.

The Leith Town Hall hosted the weightlifting events at the 1970 British Commonwealth Games.

The stage was used by director Yuri Lyubimov.

Over the years the theatre hosted a wide variety of pop artists and bands, including Mott the Hoople, Thin Lizzy and AC/DC.

=== Closure ===
In the 1980s, usage of Leith Theatre was reduced as a cost saving measure. It was used sporadically throughout the mid-1980s before being closed in 1988.

The smaller Thomas Morton Hall portion of the complex remained in use, for receptions and parties.

=== Reopening ===
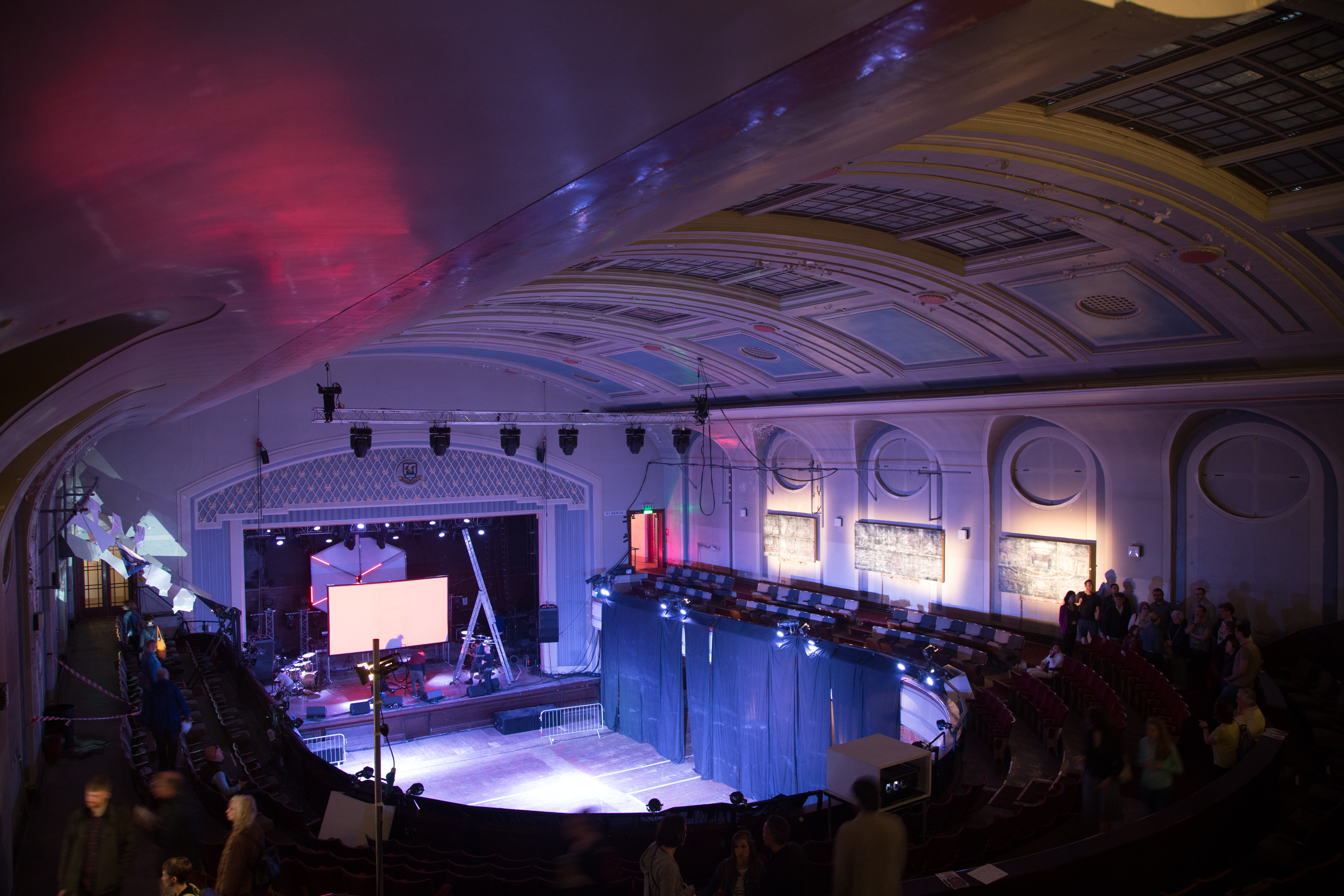
Leith Theatre (interior)

The Leith Theatre Trust was organised in 2004 to "facilitate the refurbishment of Leith Theatre, it's [sic] reopening and ongoing management".

One-off events began being held in the Theatre in 2016. In May 2017, Leith Theatre hosted the Hidden Door arts festival. The Hidden Door, which is a volunteer-run arts collective that exposes the hidden spaces of derelict buildings by using them as temporary performance venues, returned to the Leith Theatre for its May 2018 event.

In 2025, the City of Edinburgh Council granted a 50-year lease to Leith Theatre Trust, which had obtained a £4.5 million pledge from the National Lottery Heritage Fund towards the renovation of the theatre. Holmes Miller were appointed architects for the project, which was expected to cost £10 million. The renovation was expected to include roof repairs, new heating and ventilation, soundproofing, improvements to the water supply and new toilets.

In 2026, Leith Theatre secured £5 million of grant funding from the City of Edinburgh Council's Transient Tourist Levy. In the same year, it was removed from the Theatres at Risk Register.
