= Leith Library =

Library in Edinburgh, Scotland

Coordinates: 55.9755°N 3.1801°W

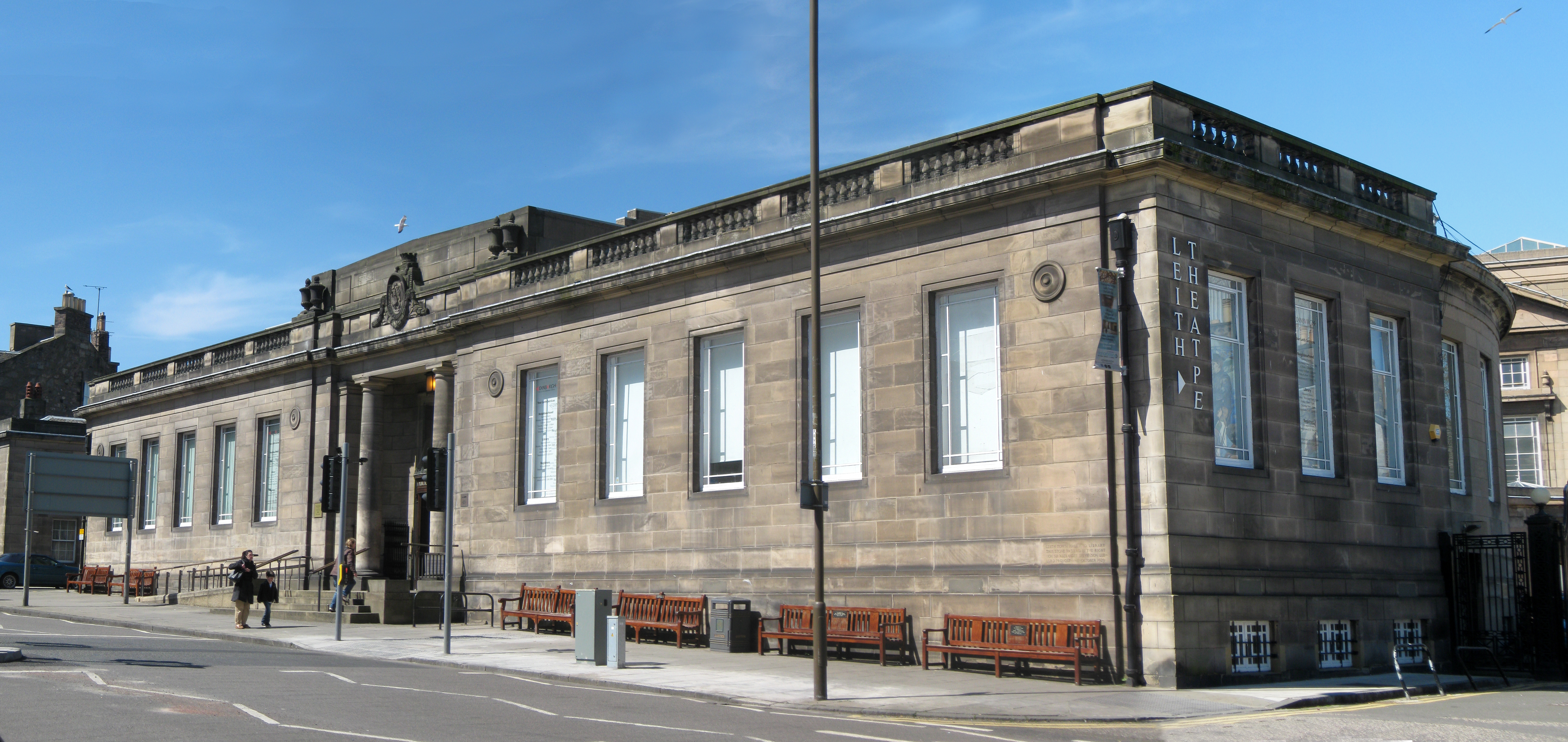
Leith Library on Ferry Road

Leith Library is one of Edinburgh's 28 freely-accessible libraries. It is a category B listed building. located in Leith, in the northern part of the city, at the foot of Ferry Road shortly before it meets Great Junction Street and North Junction Street.

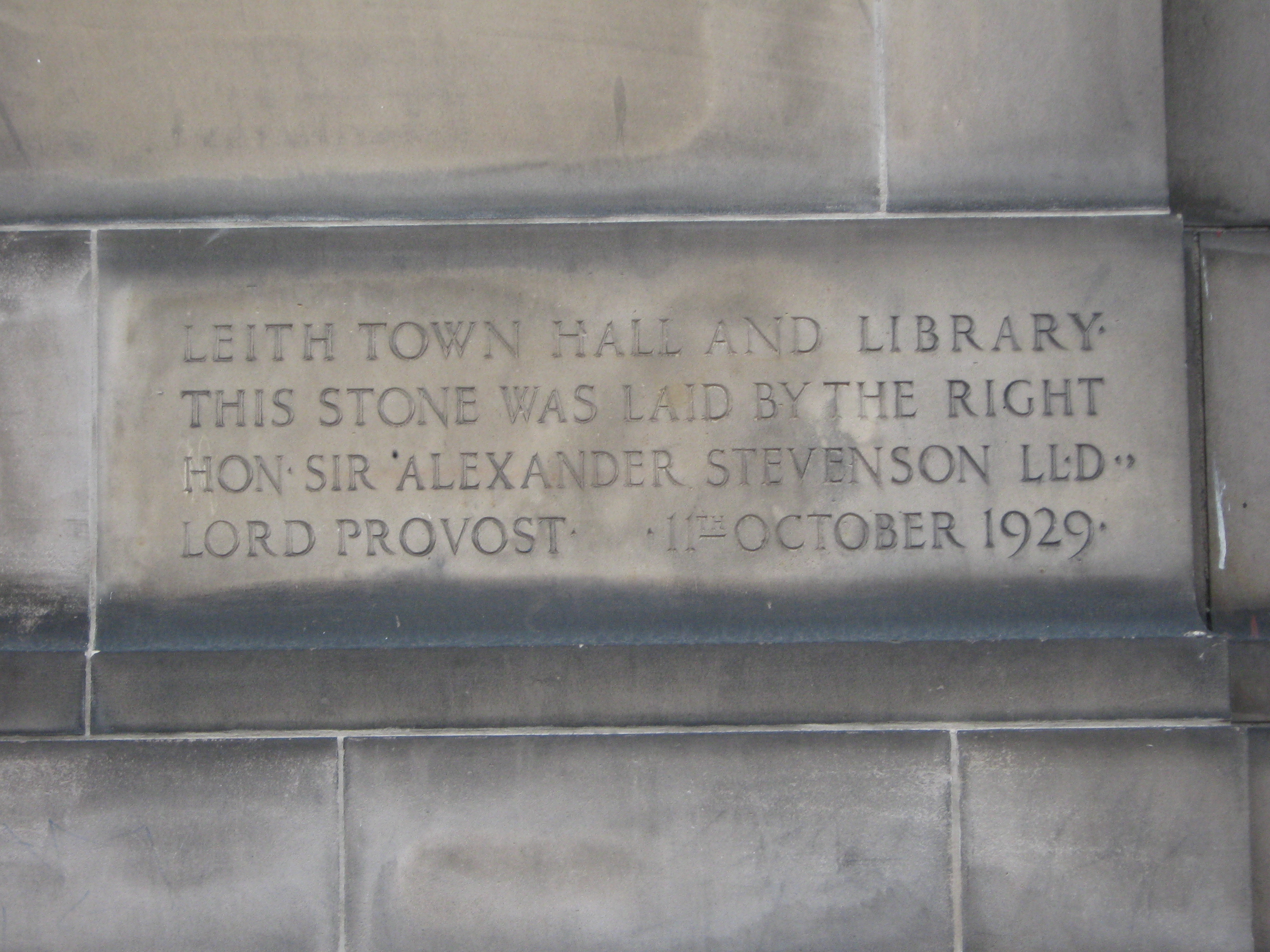
The datestone

The stone marking the first phase of construction was laid by the then Lord Provost, Alexander Stevenson in 1929. It was designed by Bradshaw Gass & Hope and opened in 1932. The building suffered bomb damage in 1941 but was subsequently restored and re-opened in 1955.

The library is currently open six days a week and, in addition to the collection of books, offers visitors computer access, a for-hire community room, public exhibition space, a knitting group and a weekly children's crafts class/workshop.

Local-area MSP Ben Macpherson also hosts surgeries within the library, and the local registrar's office adjoins the main library building. To the building's rear is the Leith Theatre.

As with all the City's libraries, Leith public library uses the Library of Congress Classification system for its adult collection. As of 1974, Edinburgh is the only area in the UK where public libraries utilise the US classification scheme. Children's books, and some non-English works, are indexed using the Dewey Decimal Classification scheme.
