= Sketchy Beats =

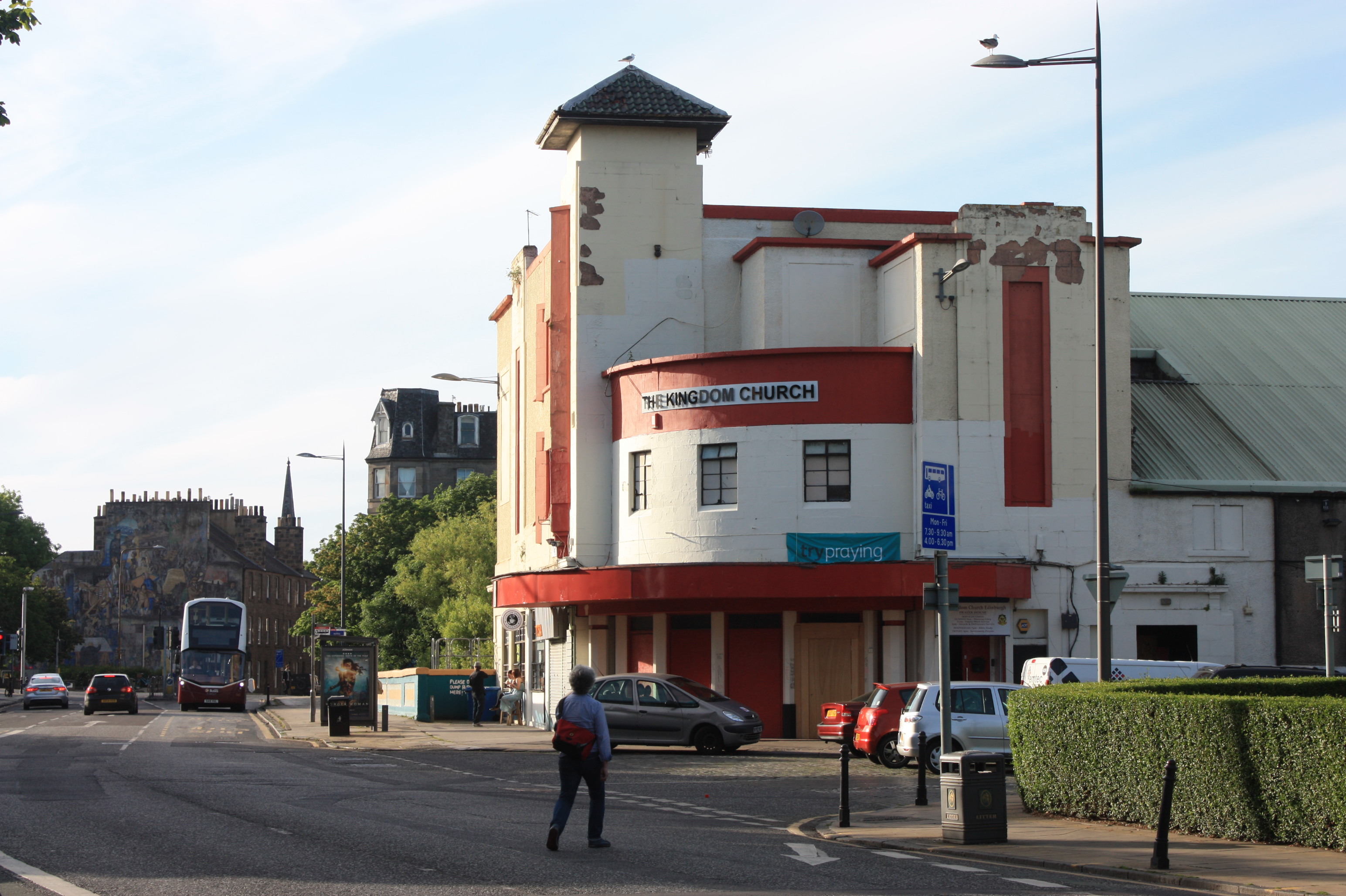
The former State Cinema, Great Junction Street, Edinburgh, the current home of Sketchy Beats

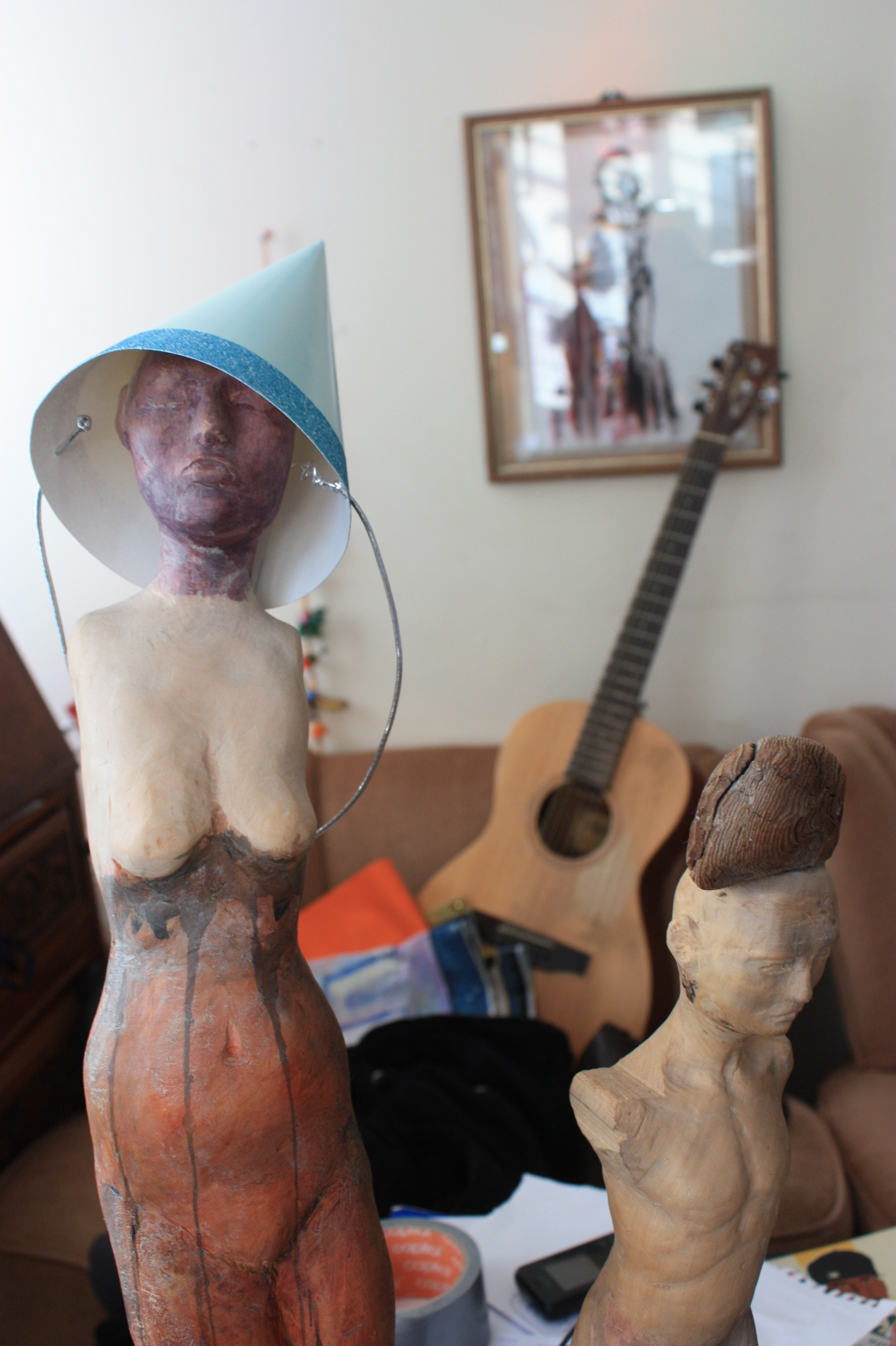
Sculptures in the interior of Sketchy Beats Cafe, Edinburgh

Sketchy Beats is an arts concept combining live music, improvised dancing and life drawing. The concept has received considerable praise and coverage in the Scottish press and in Scottish art circles.

Sketchy Beats was conceived by Cosima Canneti an Anglo-Italian philosophy student in March 2015 and initially appeared as a monthly pop-up event in the basement of the Yellow Bench concept cafe on Leith Walk in Edinburgh, with the support of Polish-born Monika Lisicka. The original format was split into three sections: live drawing of a live musician; live drawing of a dancer; and finally live drawing of a posed model. The latter sections were supported by a live DJ, who would often to continue to provide music for those who remained.

Following a crowdfunder event in late 2015, the concept removed to a new premises at 208 Great Junction Street in Leith and was specifically rebranded as Sketchy Beats Cafe. The arts events then moved to a weekly rather than monthly cycle. The specifically non-profit cafe also houses other activities such as poetry slams and music jam sessions.

With a strongly international flavour, notable models include the Italian, Eve Casini, the French jazz performance artist, Ariane Mamon, Slovak Theresa van Wald, and the Lucrezia Paterno Castello from Sicily.

In 2017 the range was expanded to include Stitchy Beats a knitting class held within an atmosphere of contemporary music.

On 30 May 2018 Sketchy Beats took over the abandoned State Cinema (attached to the rear) for a day of music, interpretive dance and sketching for the day as part of the Hidden Doors event in Leith (which also incorporated the old Leith Theatre).
