= Dr Bell's School =

Building in Edinburgh, Scotland

Coordinates: 55.9719°N 3.1747°W

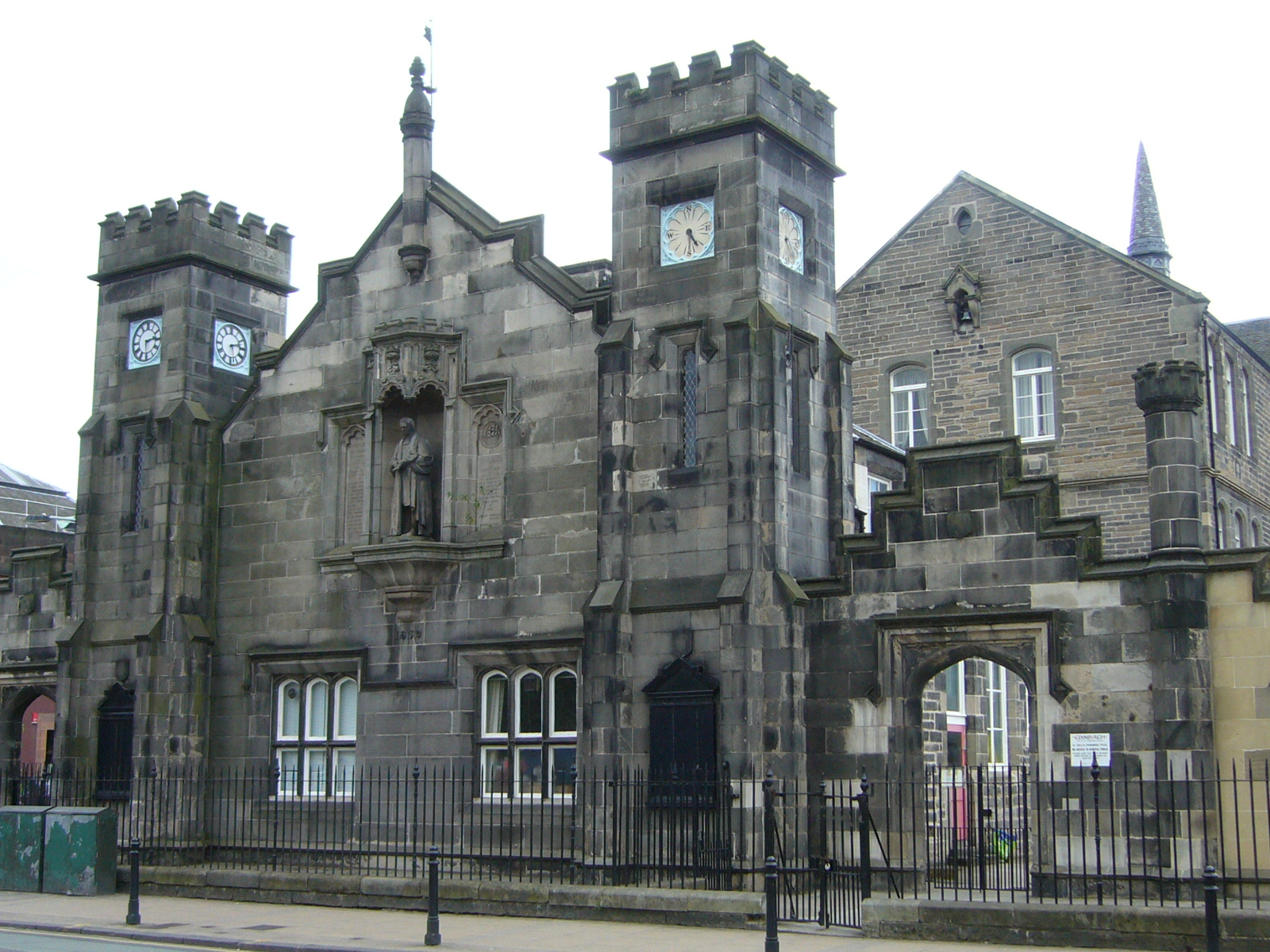
- Dr Bell's School, Leith

Listed Building – Category B
- Official name: 14, 15, 15A Junction Place, Great Junction Street school with swimming baths and stalk (also known as Dr. Bell's School)
- Designated: 29 March 1995
- Reference no.: LB27565

Dr Bell's School is a building located at 101 Great Junction Street, Leith, Scotland. The building was named after Scottish educationalist Andrew Bell (1753–1832), and is a Category B listed building of historical importance.
