= Great Junction Street =

Street in Leith, Edinburgh, Scotland

Coordinates: 55°58′26″N 3°10′37″W

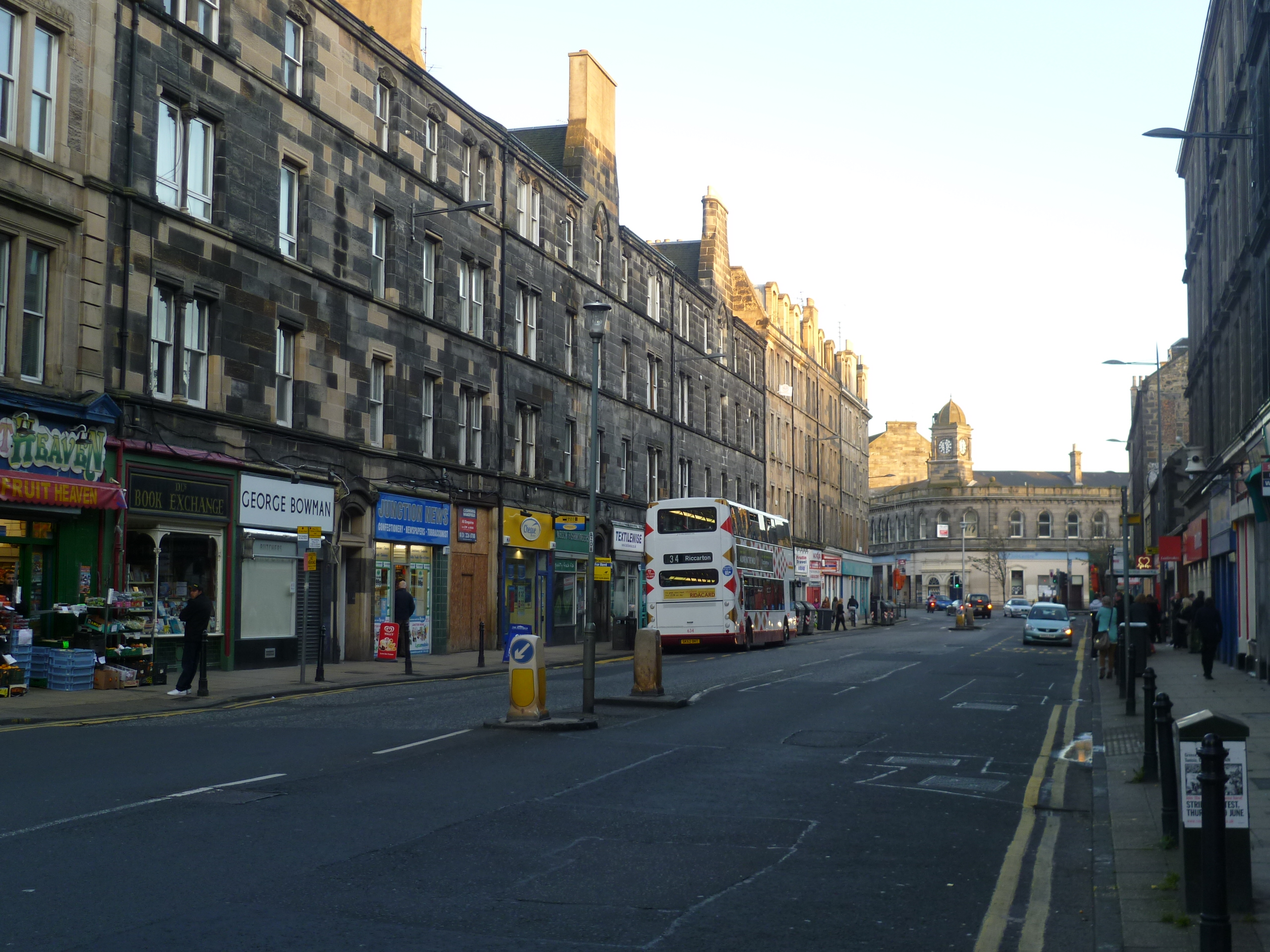
Great Junction Street south-east end

Great Junction Street is a street in Leith, on the northern outskirts of Edinburgh, Scotland. It runs southeast to northwest following approximately the southwestmost line of the old town walls around Leith.

== History ==
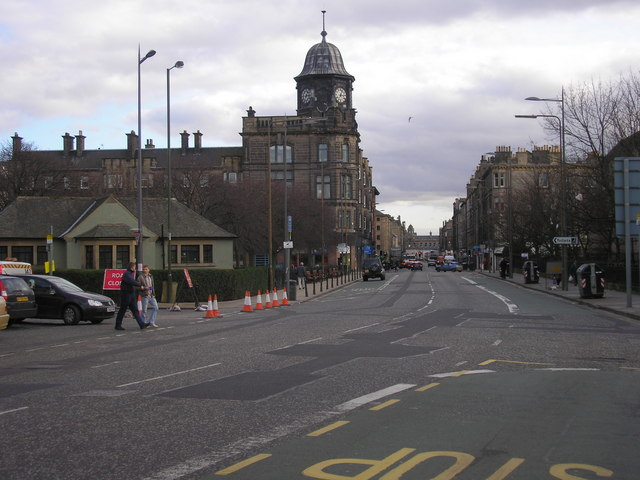
Great Junction Street north-west end

The road was planned c.1800 as a route to join the foot of Leith Walk with Ferry Road and the new wet docks bypassing the narrow and busy streets of old Leith. The link was completed by the construction of Junction Bridge over the Water of Leith in 1818 although the road between the bridge and Bonnington Road was not surfaced until the late 1830s.

The street was the site of a triumphal arch which was constructed for the reception of Queen Victoria and Prince Albert in 1842. Great crowds attended this despite the heavy rain. Prince Albert added to the general merriment of the occasion by observing that he supposed that this was just a Scotch mist.

People from Leith often refer to Great Junction Street as Junction Street. North Junction Street lies at its extreme west end. It is connected to the area known as the Shore via Henderson Street.

== Buildings ==
Although typified by tenements the tenements in their own right are not necessarily typical. Great Junction Street has an abnormal number of flat-roofed tenements. These survived the ravages of the Scottish weather due to their novel construction; three inches of horse hair and tar (strong, flexible and impervious). These roofs normally survive well until tackled by Housing Repair Grant projects, which invariably replace them with felt, not appreciating the durability and value of the original roof.

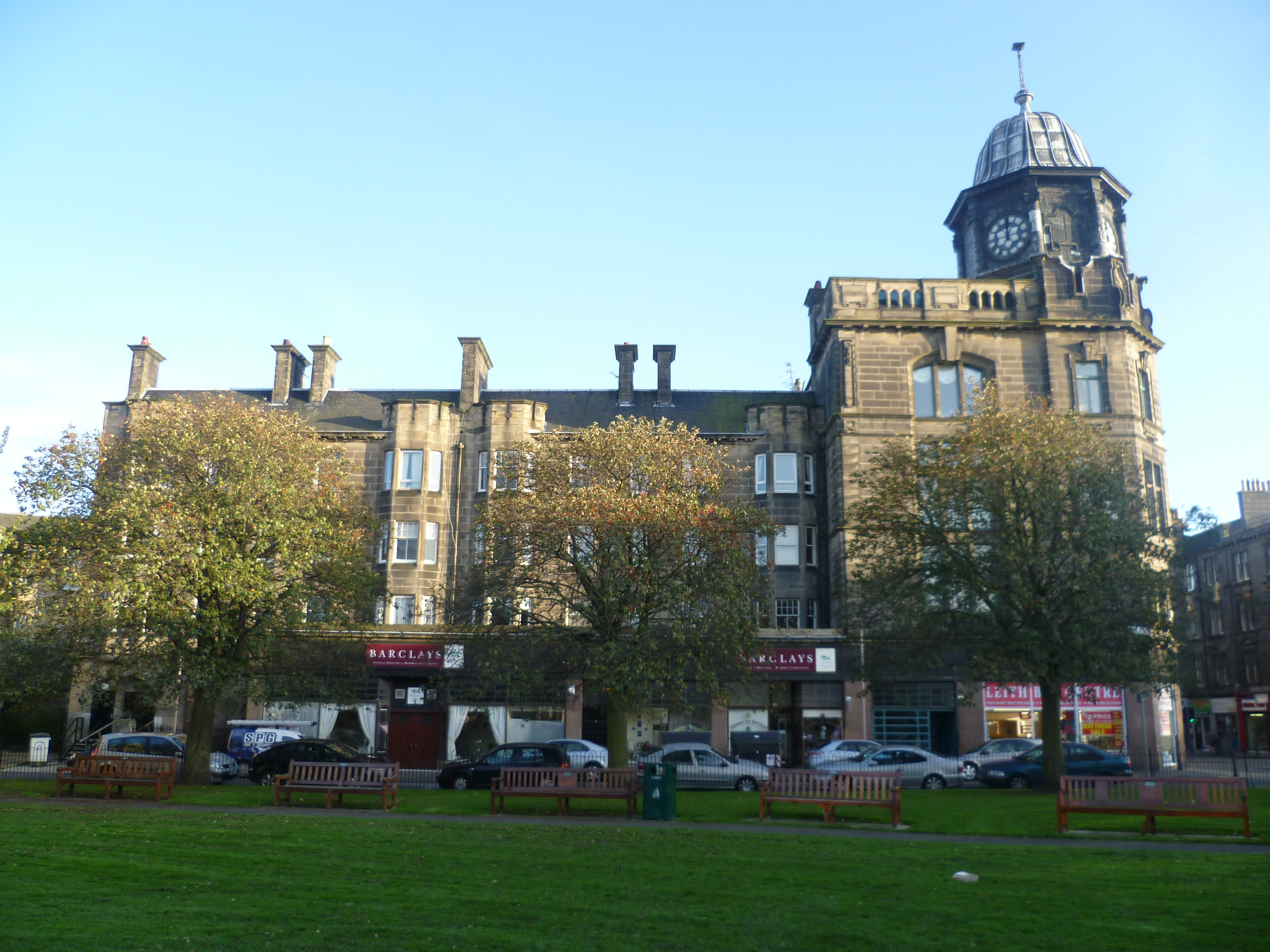
Former Leith Provident building viewed from Taylor Gardens

Other buildings of note are the former Leith Provident Co-operative Society building with its octagonal clock tower with lead-covered domed roof and Ionic attached columns making it a local landmark. Built in 1911, the building is Category B listed by Historic Scotland. Also B listed, the attached building with ground floor shops also formerly occupied by Leith Provident was built in 1905. The central warehousing (east of Cables Wynd) was built originally as a wine vault overlooking fields to the south. It was bought by Crabbie's whisky, and served as a bonded warehouse for most of the 20th century, being greatly expanded on its west side. Crabbie's Green Ginger was made in a small modern building on the east side (now demolished). The warehouse also served to mature many of the famous whiskies, which largely came to Leith to mature. This building was internally labelled in rows for Talisker, Laphroaig and so on. Following sale to United Distillers it was closed down and has now been converted to flats.

On the south side of the road, Junction Place, shows where a collection of public buildings formerly stood. "Fire Engine House", stepping into the street midway, was a horse-drawn fire service, the gates opening onto the narrowest part of the roadway. At the very end of Junction Place stood Leith Electricity Generating Station, a surprisingly domestic scale building erected in 1895 to provide electric street lights, but having a bronze plaque to explain its creation. On the west side Dr Bell's School designed by R & R Dickson in 1839 operated the Madras System of Education. Behind it, Leith Swimming Baths (now restored) linked to the Public Baths (i.e. rows of enamel baths) and Laundry (both later demolished to create the Victoria Swim Centre. The baths were in use until the late 1970s, due to the high number of Leith dwellings lacking bathrooms up to that time.

In 2002 the very unusual but very out of character Telectra House was demolished and replaced with housing. This had been built (between Cables Wynd and King Street) in the early 1960s as a department store extension to the existing Leith Provident Co-operative Society building. Despite a late call to list the building as a monument to Modern Architecture this was blocked due to high asbestos content in the building.

A plaque on the corner of King Street marks it as the now demolished birthplace of Sir John Gladstone of Fasque, father of William Gladstone the future Prime Minister of Britain.

King Street leads through to the eastern sections of Leith Hospital: the cholera isolation block and nurses home on the east, the Queen Victoria Diamond Jubilee block on the west.

The former State Cinema by James Miller & Partners stands at the extreme west end of the street adjacent to the Water of Leith. The building dates from 1938 but spent most of the latter part of the 20th century as a bingo hall. It currently houses the Kingdom Church and the Sketchy Beats concept cafe.

== Taylor Gardens ==
Taylor Gardens is the small pocket park at the west end of Great Junction Street.

It was formed in 1920, following the demolition of South Leith Poorhouse. Unusually for the period, that was not the end of Leith's poorhouse: a new poorhouse was built at Seafield in 1923, converted to a military hospital in 1939, then a normal hospital, the Eastern General, in 1946. It in turn was demolished in 2008.

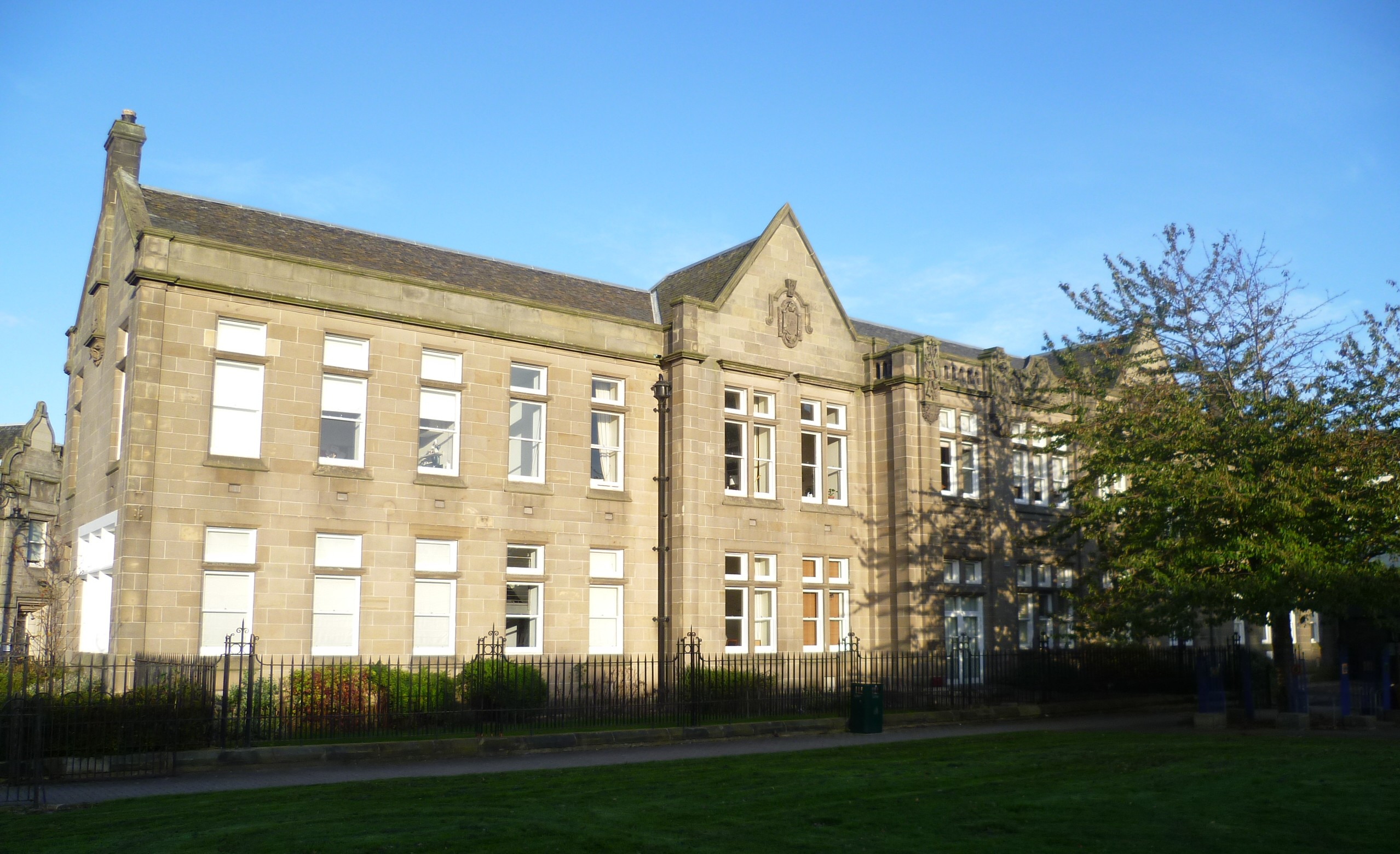
Leith War Memorial

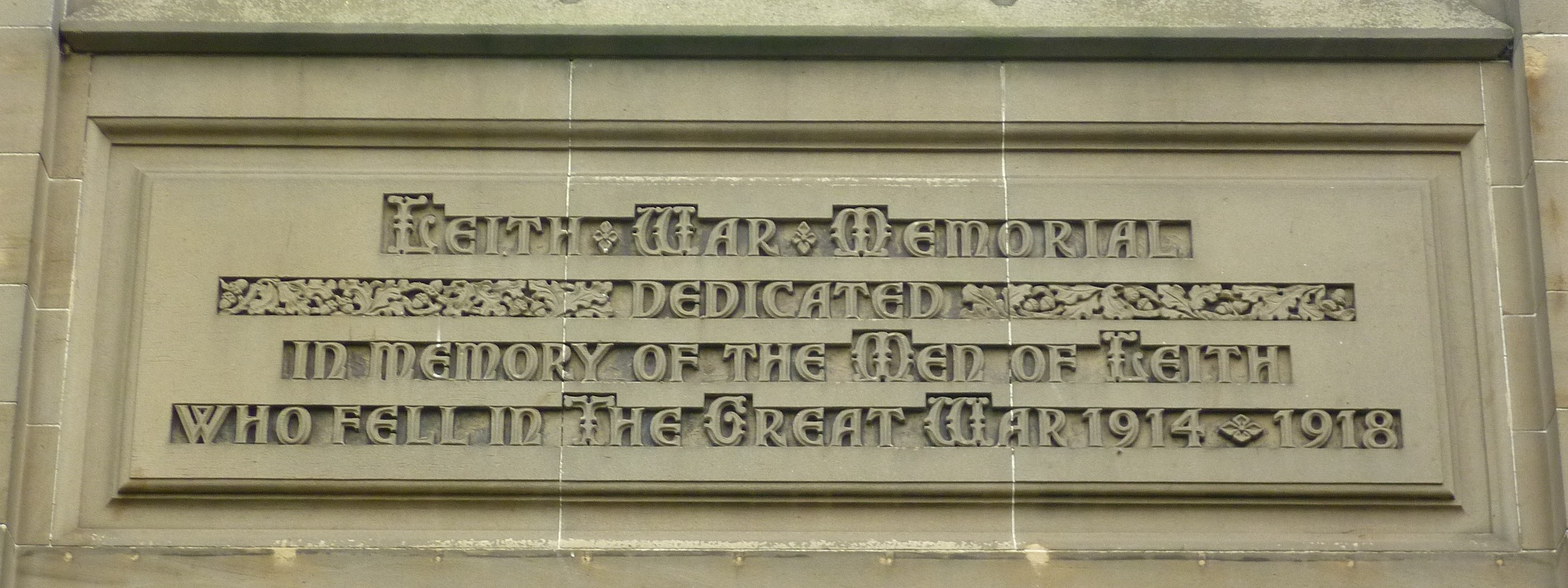
War Memorial inscription

The Taylor Gardens park was created as a setting as part of a project to expand Leith Hospital, immediately to the north. In an 1919 act of Parliamenr all local authorities were obliged to erect war memorials. There were strict guidelines on their form. Leith appealed to the authorities to request that a new wing be built on the hospital instead; specifically a children's wing. This was agreed, but clearly cost a lot more in terms of public subscription. The wing, which faces Taylor Gardens, therefore reads "Leith War Memorial" along the top, with various military badges and emblems also carved. Since the hospital's conversion to housing in the early 21st century, a new plinth has been erected in Taylor Gardens in order to lay wreaths on Remembrance Day.

On the north-west side of the gardens (on Mill Lane) stands a two-storey building dating from 1822. This was built as a school for the poorhouse, with boys on one floor and girls on the other. This was the first free education provided to females in this area. It was replaced by a new pair of schools (one for girls one for boys) further along Mill Lane, in 1838. These were built by Sir John Gladstone of Leith, William Gladstone's father. This connection led to the first-mentioned ex-school being named "Gladstones".

== The Quilts ==
Opposite Taylor Gardens is an area of Scottish Special Housing Association (SSHA) housing erected in 1981. This replaced an area cleared as slum housing as part of a Comprehensive Redevelopment Area designated by the Council.

The north-east corner has a plaque to the Siege of Leith in 1560.

The enamel street number plates were created by the artist Robin Banks.

The Ebenezer Church formerly in the centre of the street frontage was demolished but rebuilt as a new church on Bangor Road.
