= Ebenezer James MacRae =

Scottish architect (1881–1951)

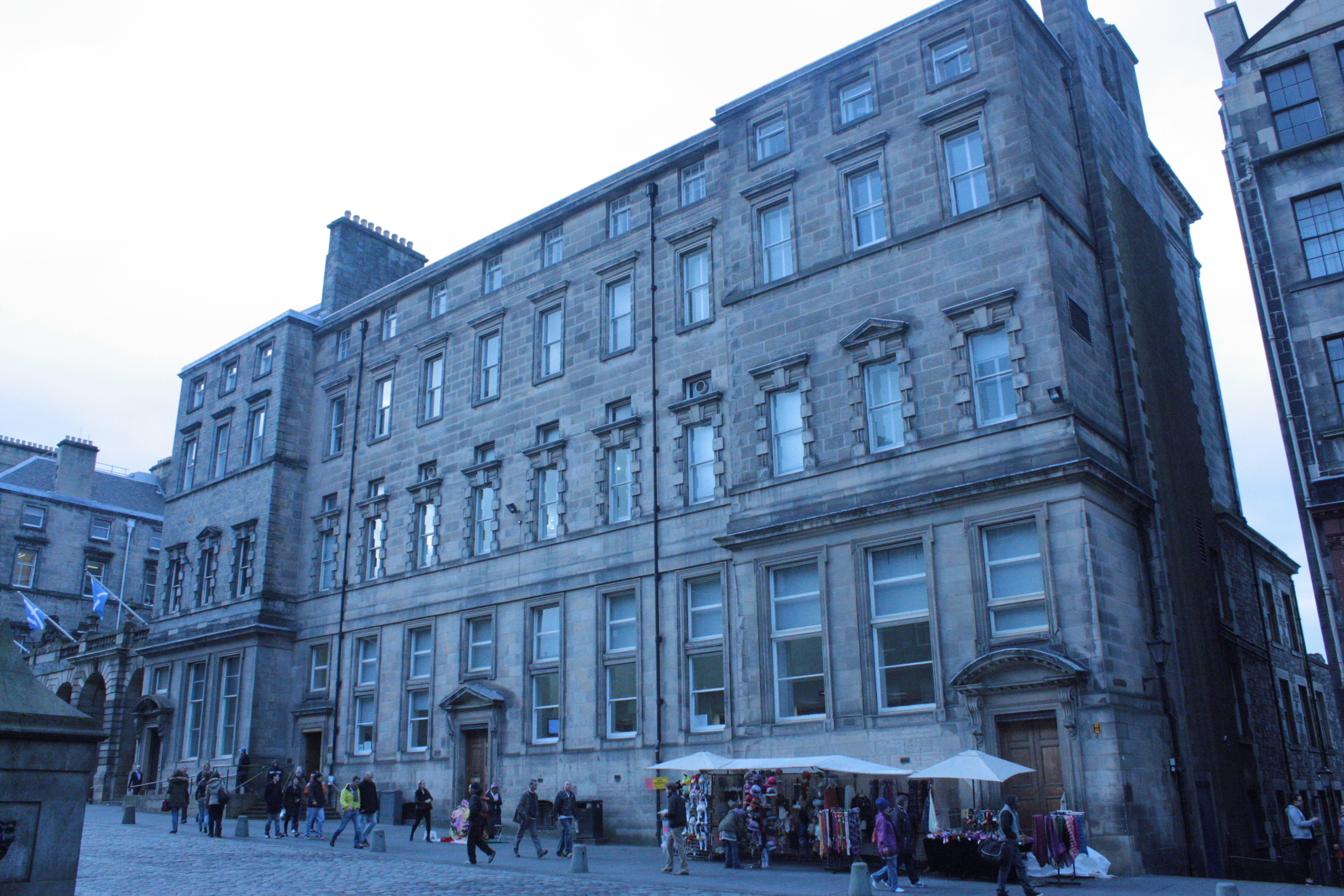
One of Macrae's wings on Edinburgh City Chambers

Ebenezer James MacRae (18 January 1881 – 15 January 1951) was a Scottish architect serving as City Architect for Edinburgh for most of his active life.

== Life ==
He was the son of Rev Alexander MacRae of the Free Church of Scotland. To family and friends he was generally known as Ben MacRae. He studied architecture under Archibald MacPherson from 1899 to 1907, remaining good friends until death. He trained at both Heriot-Watt College, the University of Edinburgh and later Edinburgh College of Art. He did various sketching tours around the country in his twenties: York, England (1902 and 1904), Melrose (1904), Belgium (1905), Cambridge (1907), Lincoln (1907), Northamptonshire (1907), and Oxford (1907).

In 1908 he trained further, under John Kinross. Late in 1908 he got a post as an assistant in the City Architect's Department of the then Edinburgh Corporation, serving under James Anderson Williamson.

He qualified as an architect in 1914. He served in the Royal Engineers during World War I then returned to Edinburgh as Depute City Architect. In 1925 he was promoted to City Architect, a role he held until retiral in 1946. In 1926 he took over the Director of Housing post from the retiring City Engineer Adam Horsburgh Campbell. From this date onwards the main thrust of his workload would be the provision of high-quality social housing with good space standards and light levels. His team provided around 12,000 houses in the city, many of which in central locations to save tenants travel costs. His housing work is discussed in detail in Volume 13 (2017) of the Book of the Old Edinburgh Club. In 1936, the young William Gordon Dey worked under MacRae undertaking the city survey of the Canongate.

In the mid-1940s he compiled "The Royal Mile" and "The Heritage of Greater Edinburgh": studies of the Old Town and remainder of the city. This document identified buildings worthy of preservation, including several within the Edinburgh New Town, Edinburgh Old Town and suburbs. It formed the basis of later works such as The Abercromby Plan and influenced the statutory lists. A keen historian, MacRae wrote a paper on the statue of Charles II in Parliament Square.

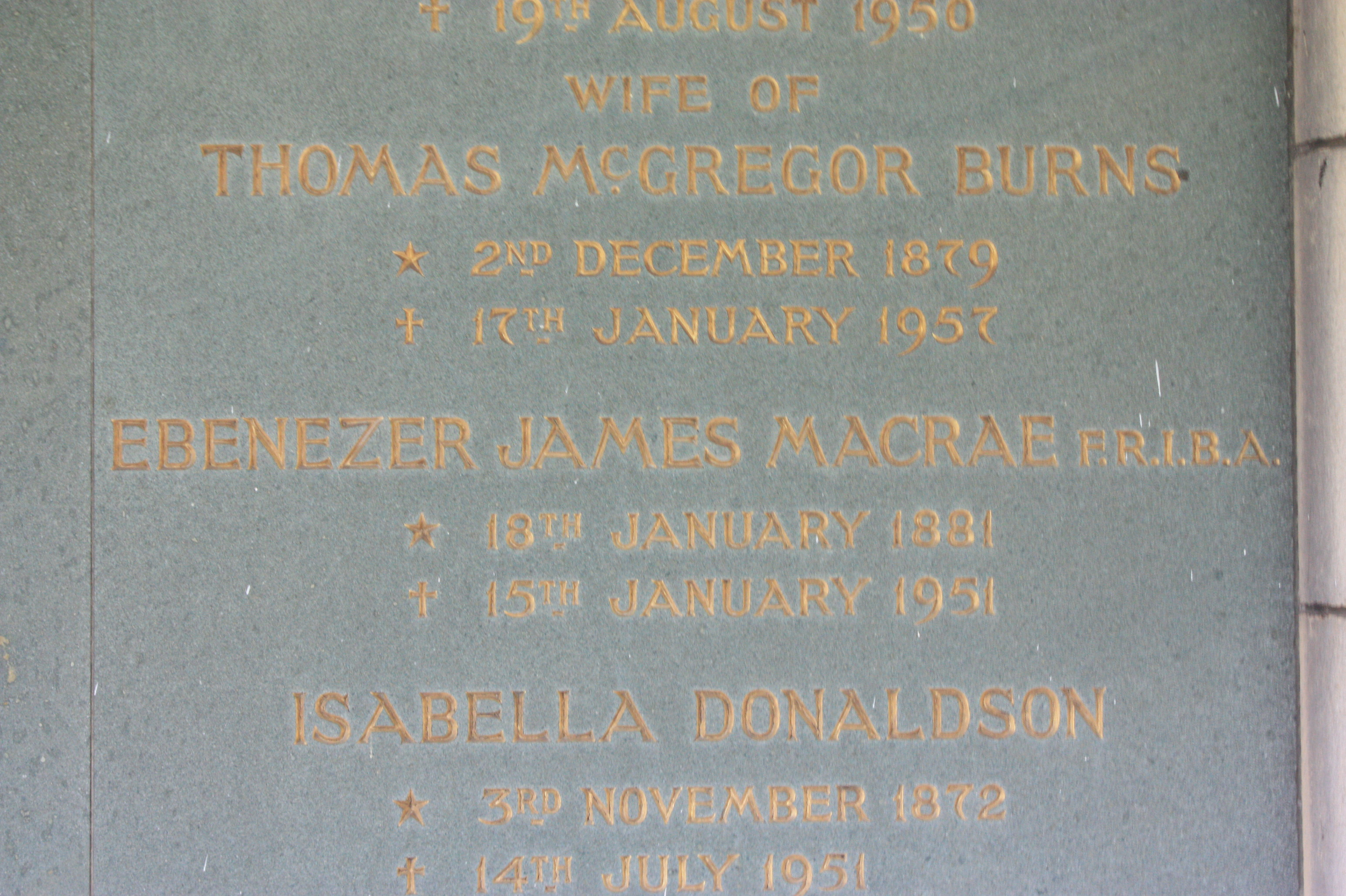
Memorial plaque to Ebenezer James MacRae, Warriston Crematorium

His final years as City Architect were relatively unproductive since most public building works ceased during World War II, an exception being the completion of West Pilton to a much depleted specification.

MacRae was noted for his championing of the tenement and for his sensitive infill developments within the Old Town and central Edinburgh. These were designed in a weak C17th Scots style, faced in stone with steep slate roofs, and include the Pleasance development, designed by Thomas Smith (1931-7) and Gifford Park (1935) designed by James Moffat Aitken. A few historic buildings were reconditioned, but Government housing policies were focused on new build. Outside the centre he built traditional housing in rendered brick, again with steep slate roofing. He resisted building more modern flats with shared facilities and only one housing development, Royston Mains Crescent (1935), designed by George Clark Robb, was built in facing brick. Other housing developments include Prestonfield, Niddrie Mains (now demolished), Stenhouse, Redbraes, Saughton Golf Course (Whitson), Craigentinny, Granton and Craigmillar.

In 1934 he toured Europe as part of a delegation from the Department of Health. The result was the influential 'Report on Working Class housing on the Continent' (1935), also known as the Highton Report. Perhaps his most European influenced development was Piershill (1935-8), a large development of 342 flats in U-shaped south-facing courts, designed by MacRae, Andrew Rollo, James Tweedie and Malcolm Murchison.

After retirement he moved out of the city to live at Taprobane in Ratho where he lived with his wife Dorothy Craigie, affectionately known as Mopsy.

His hobbies included ornithology, photography and watercolour painting.

He died at the Deaconess Hospital in the Pleasance Edinburgh after a short illness. He was cremated at Warriston Crematorium on 22 January 1951 and his ashes were scattered in the Garden of Remembrance there. A memorial plaque to his memory stands in the south arcade of the crematorium.

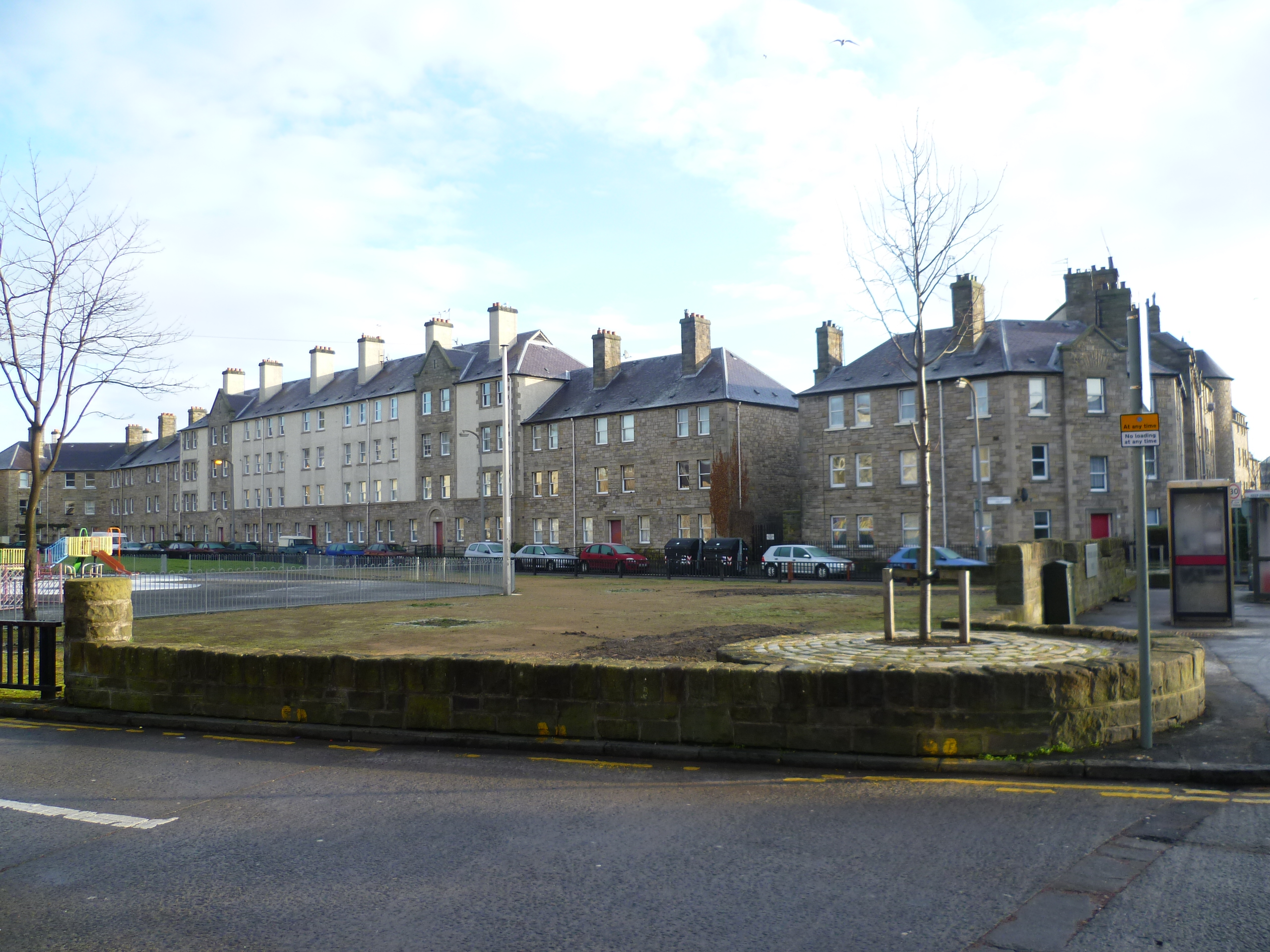
Piershill

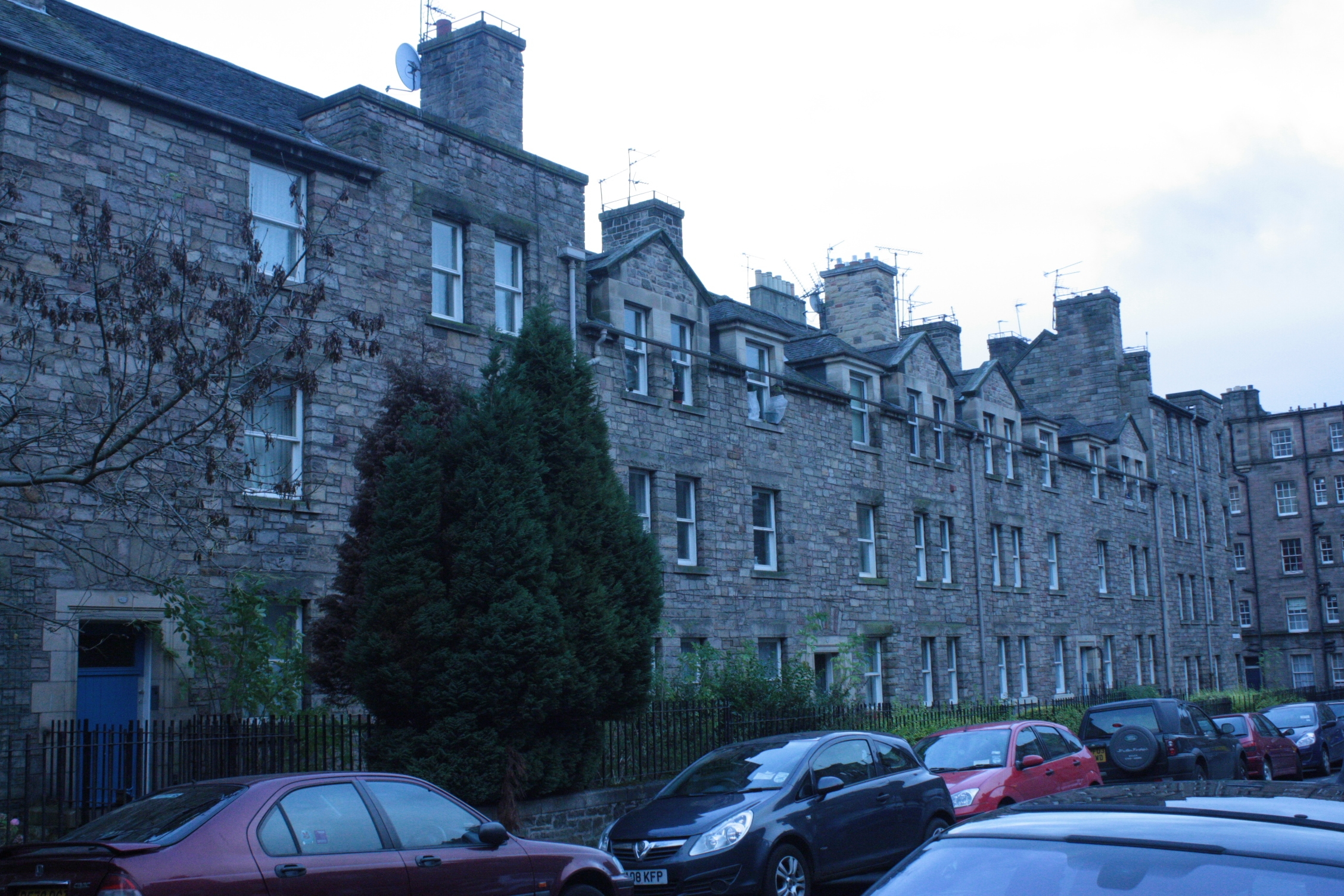
Gifford Park- a small city infill scheme

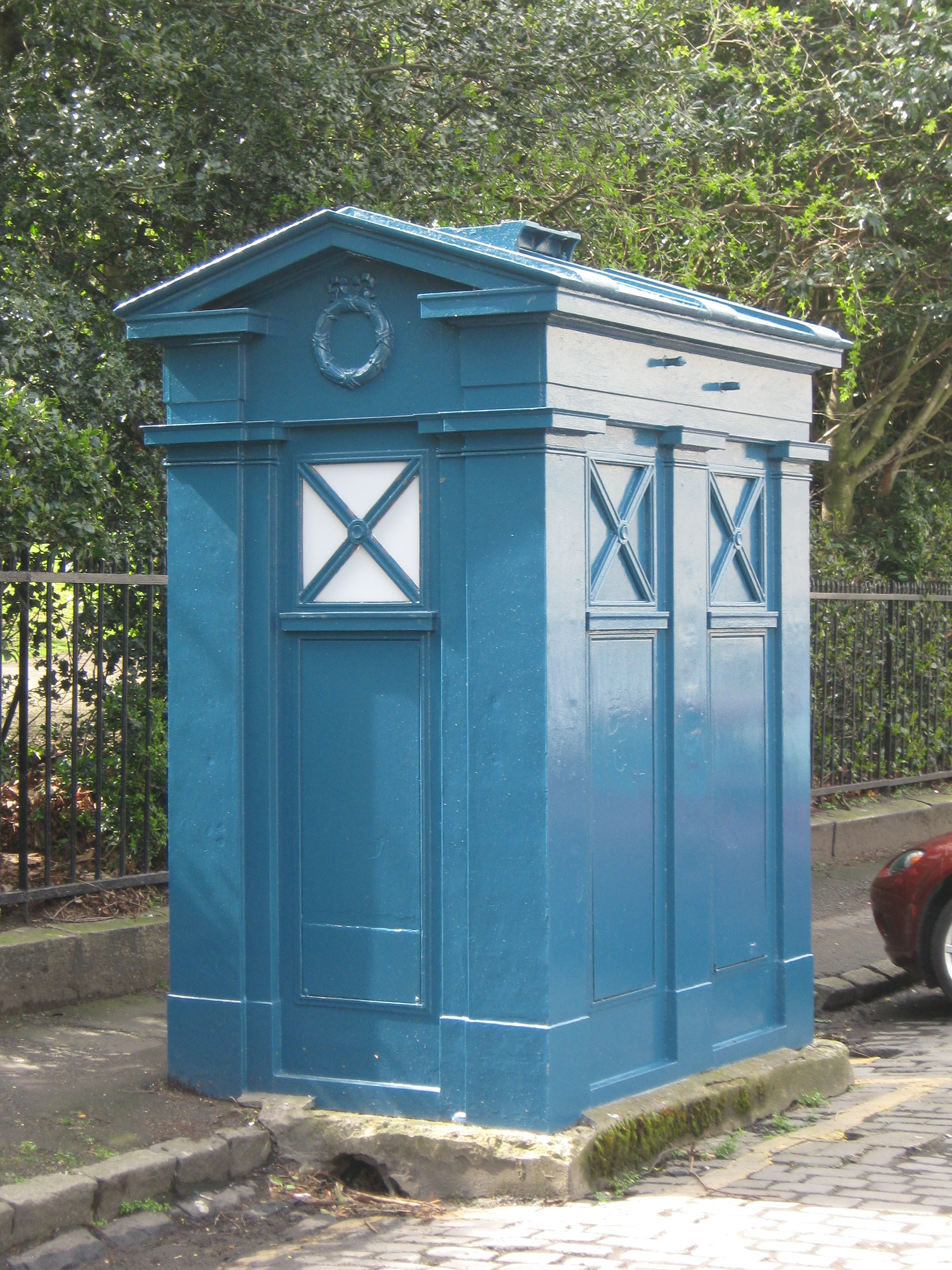
MacRae's Police Box design for Edinburgh

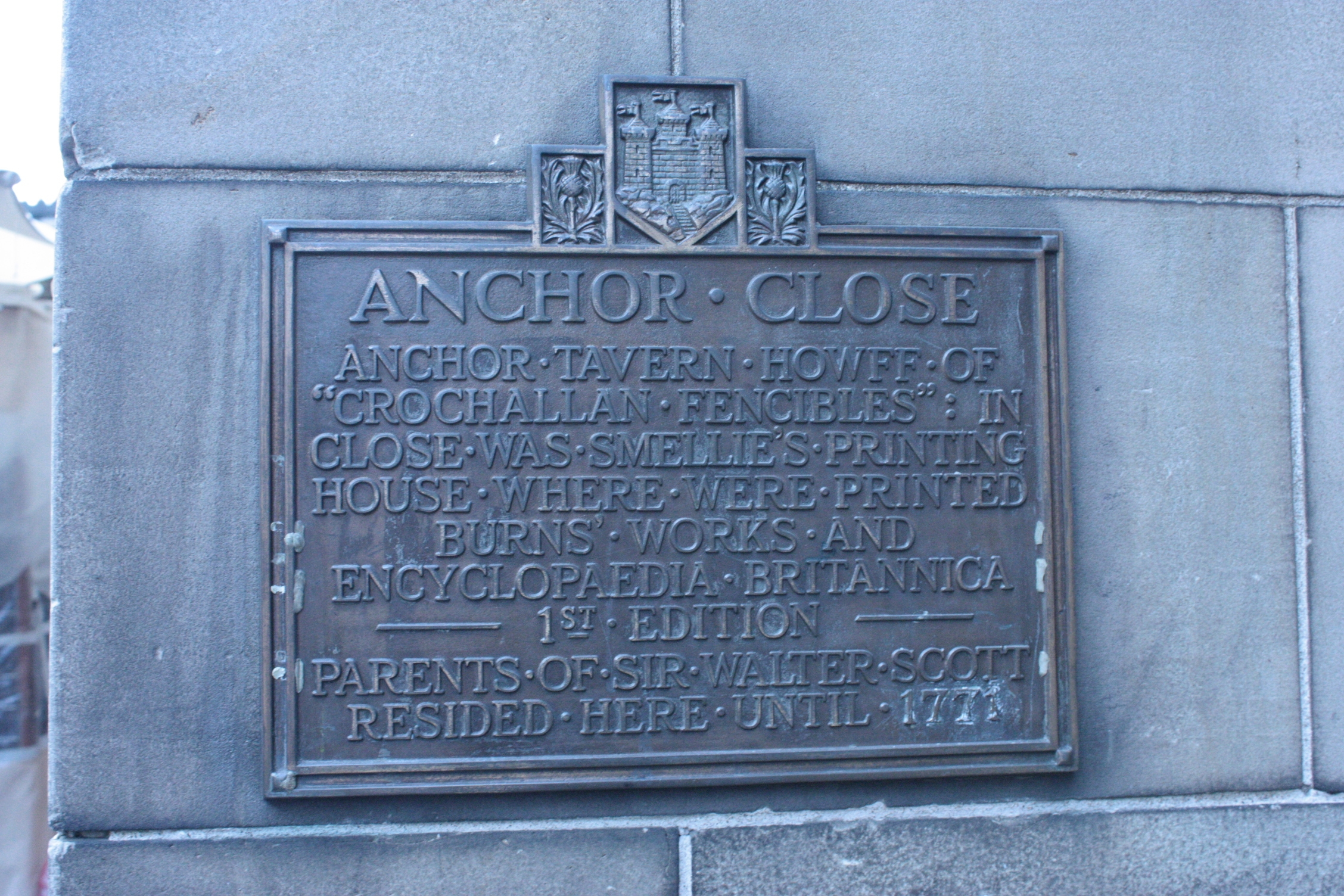
One of the bronze plaques erected under Macrae (Anchor Close)

== List of works ==
- Our Lady of Loretto and St Michael RC Church, Musselburgh, works to presbytery and hall whilst working under Archibald MacPherson (1903)
- Repairs at Kirkwall Cathedral, Orkney, whilst working under John Kinross (1907)
- Gorgie Cattle Market, Corporation Slaughterhouse and a police station, whilst assisting J A Anderson (1909)
- Kilcalmonell Churchyard, War Memorial Gateway (1921) as a private commission (probably unpaid)
- Further extensions to Gorgie Market and Slaughterhouse (now as City Architect) (1926)
- Edinburgh's Tram shelters and waiting rooms (1926) all lost but a waiting room (now converted to a house) still survives at 6 Liberton Gardens
- Stable court/curator's offices at Lauriston Castle soon after the city's acquisition of this property (1927)
- His tour de force, Portobello Power Station (1927–34), together with the linked Portbello Lido which borrowed its hot water from the station's cooling pipes. This was the major landmark in Portobello until its demolition 1977 to 1979 (it took 18 months to demolish this giant structure)
- Slateford Housing Scheme (1925-7) Layout by Campbell
- Prestonfield Housing Scheme (1925-7) Layout by Campbell.
- Layout of St Margarets Park, Corstorphine (1927)
- 40-42 Candlemaker Row, remodelling of Candlemakers Hall (1929)
- 15-19 and 74-84 Grassmarket (1929)
- Public Library in Corstorphine (1929)
- Niddrie Mains Housing Scheme (1929)(largely demolished)
- Stenhouse Housing Scheme (1930)
- 24 houses in Gilmerton on the edge of Edinburgh (1930)
- Greyfriars Hostel, 2-12 Cowgate (1930)
- Restoration of 74-96 West Bow (1930)
- Stenhouse Housing Scheme (1930) - 470 houses
- Restoration of 39-43 Candlemaker Row (1930) including a new interior
- Pavilion at Clarebank School, Leith (1930)
- Widening of Lothian Road onto an arcade over the graveyards at St Cuthberts and St Johns (1930)
- Several tenements on the Canongate as part of the Canongate Improvement Scheme (1930)
- Alterations to Edinburgh City Library on George IV Bridge (1930)
- Leith Poorhouse (converted to hospital use in 1939 and renamed the Eastern General Hospital) (1931) now demolished.
- Numerous combined traffic signs/ street lamps at various T-junctions (still surviving in West End) (1931)
- Public wash-house on Junction Place, Leith (1931) now demolished
- Redbraes Housing Estate (1931) Layout by DG Bannerman
- Saughton Golf Course Housing Scheme (Whitson) (1931) layout by GC Robb
- Craigentinny Housing Estate (1932) Layout by GC Robb
- Wardie Primary School (1931)
- Craigmillar Primary School (Former School Building) (1932)
- Saughton Housing Scheme (1932–1933)
- Balgreen Primary School (1932)
- Granton Housing Estate - Granton (1932–33)
- Braidhills Golf Club pavilion and tearoom (1932) Designed by AG Forgie
- School at Niddrie Mains Terrace (1932) Mural inside
- Portobello Outdoor Swimming Pool ("Lido") (1933)
- Granton Housing Estate - Wardieburn (1933) layout by GC Robb
- Pleasance development, Richmond Place, West Richmond Street etc. (1934) By Tom Smith.
- Additions to Nurses Home at Bangour Village Asylum (Bangour Hospital) near Uphall, West Lothian (1934)
- Addition of east and west wings to the City Chambers (facing the Royal Mile) (1934)
- Craigentinny Primary School (1935)
- Tenement infill at 49 Buccleuch Street (1935)
- Gifford Park housing (1932) designed by J Aitken
- Georgian replica tram depot offices at 3-5 Smiths Place (off Leith Walk (1936)
- Edinburgh City Chambers, internal refit largely remodelling main stair and increasing height of windows there (adding stained glass) (1936)
- Recessed block at 28 West Port for Housing Association (1936)
- Piershill housing scheme (1936) By MacRae, Andrew Rollo, James Tweedie and Malcolm Murchison
- Craigmillar housing scheme (1936) Layout by Tom Smith
- Granton Housing Estate - Royston Mains (1936-8) Layout by GC Robb
- Crewe Road Gardens Housing Scheme, West Pilton (1936)
- Edinburgh's Police Boxes (around ninety in number) (c.1937) with A Rollo
- Royston Primary School (1937) (Demolished in 2010/2011)
- Granton Primary School (1937)
- Mount Lodge Housing Estate, Portobello (1937)
- West Pilton Housing Estate inc Ferry Road Housing, West Pilton (1937–1951)
- Murrayburn Primary School (1938)
- Craigmuir Primary School, West Pilton (late 1930s) (Now Demolished)
- 3,4, 5 St Patrick Street (1938) In traditional style to match Square
- Peffermill School (1939) Demolished
- Housing at Barony Street (1939) designed by RS Ellis
- Blocks 24 and 25 at Bangour Hospital (1939)
- Holy Cross Academy (1939)
- Tanfield Primary School (1939)
- Extensions to the City Poorhouse at Craiglockhart (1939)
- Tenement at 174 Morrison Street (1939) Designed by RS Ellis. Flat roof through wartime restrictions.

MacRae appears to have been involved in several projects promoting the history of Edinburgh: a series of bronze plaques at the head of the various historic closes along the Royal Mile, explaining their history; works at the Marquis of Huntly's house removing ground floor shops and addition of faux stone inscriptions; works in Greyfriars Kirkyard, consolidating tombs and organising recarving of several panels on the tops of tombs (leading to their current homogeneity).
