= Western General Hospital =

- NHS Lothian
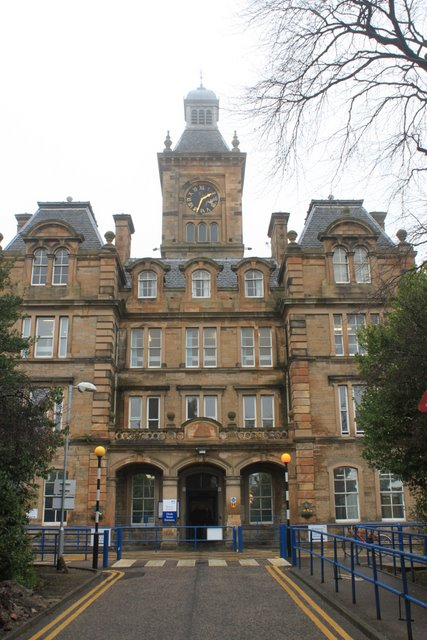
- Clock Tower at the Western General Hospital

- Shown in Craigleith in Edinburgh

Geography
- Location: Edinburgh, Scotland
- Coordinates: 55.962142°N 3.234947°W

Organisation
- Care system: NHS Scotland
- Type: General Hospital
- Affiliated university: University of Edinburgh Medical School

Services
- Emergency department: Minor Injuries Unit only
- Beds: 570

History
- Founded: 1868

Links
- Website: Western General Hospital

The Western General Hospital (often abbreviated to simply ‘The Western General’) is a health facility at Craigleith in the north of Edinburgh, Scotland. It is managed by NHS Lothian.

== History ==
The hospital was designed by Peddie and Kinnear and opened as the St. Cuthberts and Canongate Poorhouse in 1868, principally as a workhouse but also having some hospital functions. It was later renamed Craigleith Poorhouse. In 1915, during the First World War, the building was requisitioned by the War Office to create the 2nd Scottish General Hospital, a facility for the Royal Army Medical Corps to treat military casualties. After returning to poorhouse use in 1920, it was converted fully to hospital use in 1927. A nurses' home was added in 1935 and a pathology block was completed in 1939. It joined the National Health Service in 1948 and a new library was completed in 1979.

The first Maggie's Cancer Caring Centre opened on the Western General Hospital site in 1996.

In June 2012 the Medicine for the Elderly services were transferred from the Royal Victoria Hospital to a new purpose-built facility known as the Royal Victoria Building at the Western General Hospital.

A facility to treat young people with cancer aged 16 to 24 was opened in the Western General Hospital in December 2013.

== Notable nursing staff ==
Matrons of the Western General Hospital include:

- 1929–1951 Theresa Allan
- 1951–1964 Estelle Adamson, OBE
- 1964–1972 Margaret Nimmo
- 1972–1974 Elizabeth Edwards
- 1974–1976 J.L.P. Robertson
- 1977–1987 Elizabeth McLean
- 1987– Alexandra Harvey

During Allan’s time as matron the Western General Hospital was recognised as a nurse training school in 1931. She was one of the first matrons to introduce a Preliminary Training School for nurses and the block system of training. She was also behind the introduction of the training of male nurses at the Western. Allan was awarded the Polish Gold Cross for her services to the Paderewski Hospital (Polish) when it formed part of the Western General Hospital during World War II. This existed for six years and received over 7,000 Polish servicemen and civilians as inpatients and was the training school for the Polish Faculty of Medicine established at Edinburgh University.

=== Other notable nurses ===
- Lillie Johnson was the first Jamaican to train as a nurse at the Western General Hospital, graduating in 1954. Her work included advocating for patients with sickle cell disease.

== Buildings ==
Buildings include:

- Nuffield Transplant Unit by Peter Womersley, 1955 – distinctive modernist architecture and pedestrian bridge over the south access road
- A range of functional buildings from the 1950s (including surgical theatres) by Basil Spence
- Nurses Home by City Architect (Ebenezer MacRae) 1935
- Pathology Department by City Architect (Ebenezer MacRae) 1939
- Royal Victoria Building. The RVB was built primarily as a replacement for the Royal Victoria Hospital, a Medicine of the Older Adult assessment and rehabilitation Unit.

== Services ==
The hospital has over 700 beds including day beds. Although the Western no longer has an Accident and Emergency department, a nurse-led minor injuries unit has been operating on the site since 1994.

The hospital served as a base for the neurology and neurosurgery centre for south east Scotland ("Department of Clinical Neurosciences") until the department moved to the Edinburgh Royal Infirmary at Little France in 2020.

There is a major national cancer research and treatment centre at the hospital which was refurbished in 2007.
