= Royal Victoria Hospital, Edinburgh =

Royal Victoria Hospital
- NHS Lothian
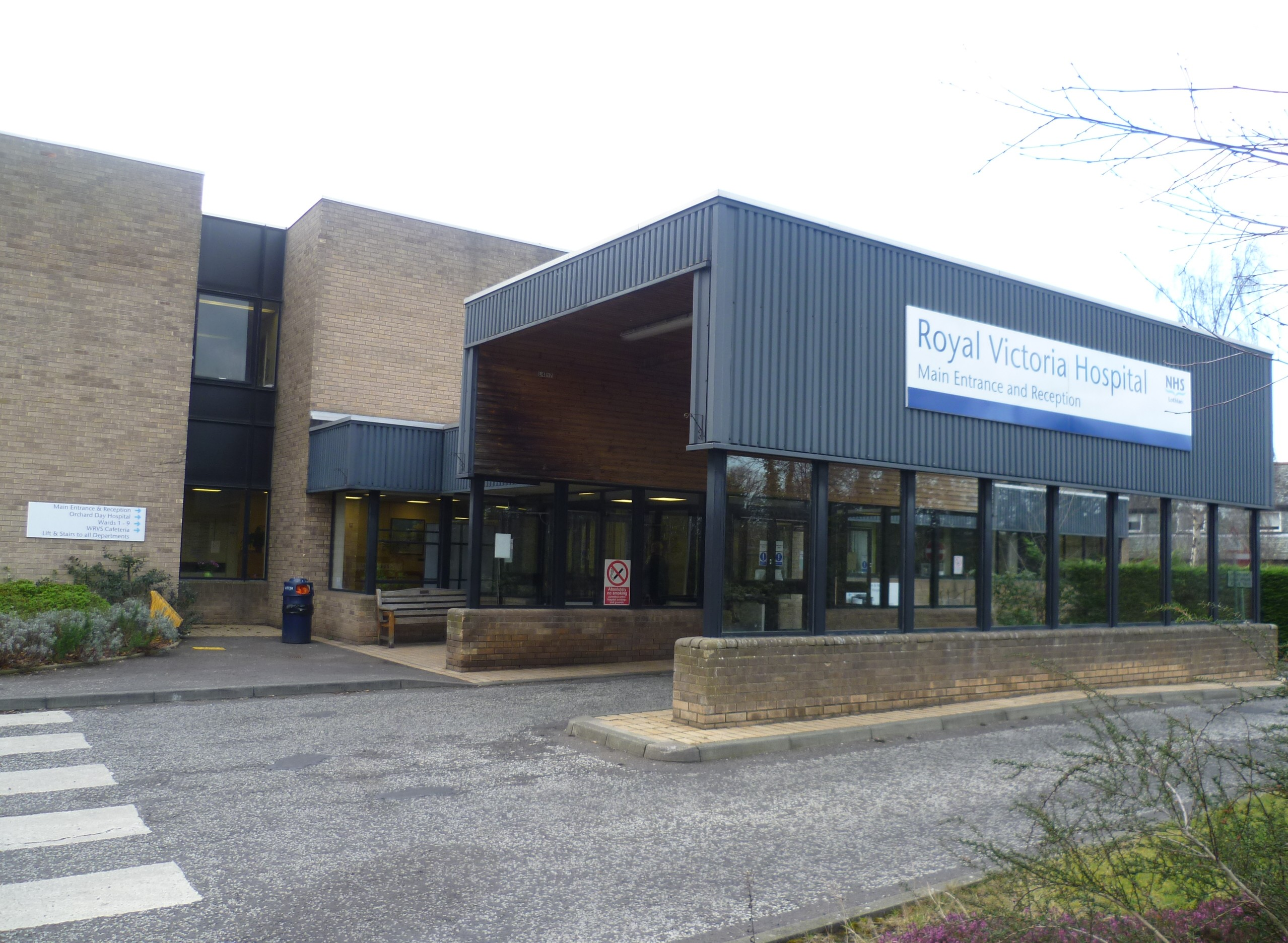
- Main entrance to the hospital

- Location within Edinburgh

Geography
- Location: Edinburgh, Scotland
- Coordinates: 55°57′30″N 3°14′00″W

Organisation
- Care system: NHS Scotland

Services
- Emergency department: No

History
- Founded: 1894
- Closed: 2017

Links
- Lists: Hospitals in Scotland

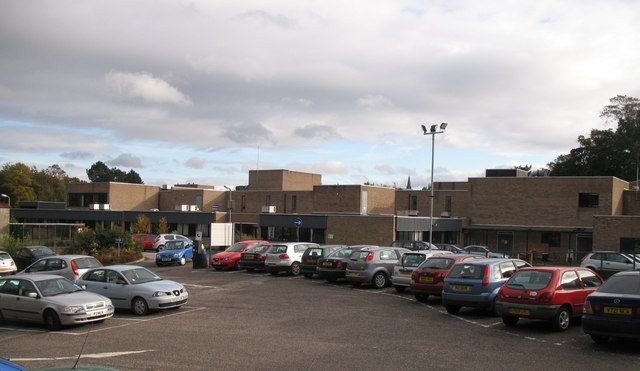

The Royal Victoria Hospital was a health facility at Craigleith Road in the north-west of Edinburgh, Scotland. It was formerly the main Medicine for the Older Adult assessment and rehabilitation hospital for the north of Edinburgh. It closed in 2012, then briefly reopened to ease pressure on acute beds in the region. The facility finally closed in early 2017 and was not in use when a fire caused damage to buildings in May 2017. It was managed by NHS Lothian.

== History ==
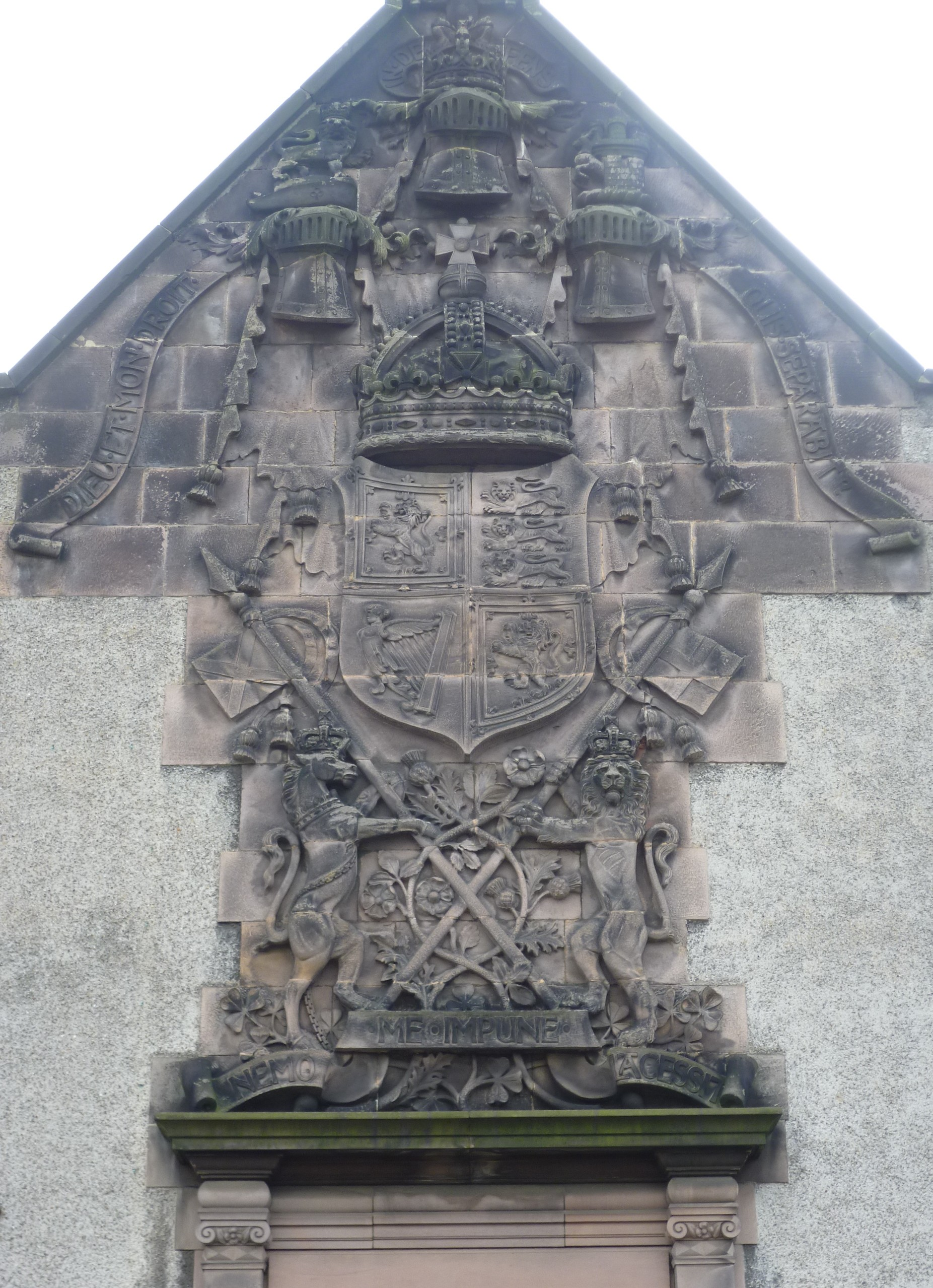
The Royal Arms above an entrance to the admin block

The hospital was established by Robert William Philip on the site at Craigleith as the Victoria Hospital for Consumption in 1894. The existing Craigleith house was converted and a series of butterfly plan pavilions were erected. There were covered sheltered in the grounds and continuous open-window treatment was also administered. In 1904 it became the Royal Victoria Hospital for Consumption with King Edward VII giving patronage. The pavilions were demolished in the late 20th century.

In a 1968 a new purpose-built brick building was completed by Reiach, Hall and Partners. With a 247-bed capacity, it became the main geriatric assessment and rehabilitation hospital for the north of Edinburgh.

In June 2012 the Medicine for the Elderly services were transferred from the Royal Victoria Hospital to a new purpose-built facility known as the Royal Victoria Building at the Western General Hospital.

Although the facility closed briefly in 2012, bed shortages elsewhere meant that the health board opted to continue providing services at this site. One ward reopened at the end of November and another a week later. By early 2013 the health board expected the facility to be in use for at least two further years.

In 2014, the health board considered proposals to demolish the hospital and three others, with a view to replacing these facilities with care villages which would consist of buildings more suited to social care. The facility finally closed in early 2017 and was not in use when a fire caused damage to buildings in May 2017.

== Services ==
Within the Medical Unit there was an Acute Assessment Ward, a two-ward Trauma Unit that specialised in falls and orthopaedic rehabilitation, a Parkinson’s Disease Unit, a rehabilitation ward with an interest in delirium, and a Stroke Rehabilitation Unit.
