= Ferry Road =

Street in City of Edinburgh, Scotland

Coordinates: 55.97207°N 3.20234°W

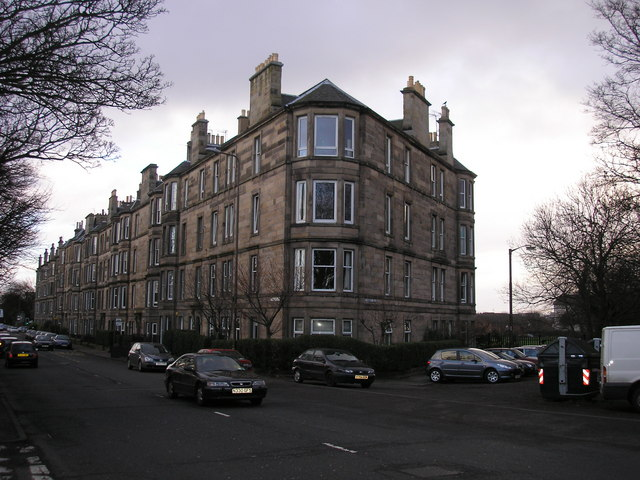
Tenements on Ferry Road at Chancelot Terrace

Ferry Road is one of the major roads of Edinburgh, Scotland, deriving its name from being the road from Queensferry to Leith. It runs from the eastern end of Davidson's Mains village in the west, to Leith in the east, passing through Drylaw, Crewe Toll and Goldenacre on the way. It is classified as the A902 from Leith to Crewe Toll where the A902 continues as Telford Road.

Notable features along the route include, in the west, the former Northern General Hospital's site (now demolished for a supermarket, the Western General Hospital is also nearby), the playing fields of Fettes College, Stewarts Melville and other private schools to the south, a geriatric home of the Salvation Army, Goldenacre stadium etc. Drylaw Police Station is also situated on Ferry Road. Leith public library is located shortly before where Ferry Road meets North Junction Street and Great Junction Street
