= 2020 Scottish Women's Premier League 2 =

Scottish Women's Premier League 2
- Season: 2020
- Matches played: 5
- Goals scored: 27 (5.4 per match)
- Biggest home win: Hamilton Academical 5–0 Stirling University (23 February 2020)
- Biggest away win: Queen's Park 2–4 St Johnstone (23 February 2020)
- Highest scoring: Dundee United 8–4 Boroughmuir Thistle (23 February 2020)
- All statistics correct as of 23 February 2020. Season declared null and void as a result of the coronavirus pandemic.

The 2020 Scottish Women's Premier League 2 was due to be the fifth season of the SWPL 2 as the second-highest division of women's football in Scotland, below SWPL 1 and above the newly introduced SWF Championship.

Heart of Midlothian had finished as winners of the 2019 SWPL 2 and were promoted to SWPL 1, with Stirling University coming in the opposite direction. Aberdeen, Queen's Park and Boroughmuir Thistle joined the SWPL 2 as the promoted clubs from the SWFL, whilst no teams had been relegated as the league was expanded from eight teams to ten.

The season started on 21 February 2020 and was scheduled to end in November 2020, but was interrupted by the coronavirus pandemic. In July 2020, the 2020 season was declared null and void. A new season began October 2020 and concluded in July 2021, with the league reverting to a winter season format.

== Teams ==
Locations of teams in the 2020 SWPL 2

Team	Location	Head coach	Home ground	Capacity	2019 position
Aberdeen	Aberdeen	(Scotland) Emma Hunter	Aberdeen Sports Village	1,000	1st in SWFL 1 North
Boroughmuir Thistle	Edinburgh	(Scotland) Suzy Shepherd	Meggetland Sports Complex	1,000	5th in SWFL 1 South
Dundee United	Dundee	(Scotland) Gavin Beith	GA Engineering Arena	1,000	3rd
Glasgow Women	Glasgow	(Scotland) Craig Joyce	Petershill Park	1,000	6th
Hamilton Academical	Hamilton	(Scotland) Gary Doctor	New Douglas Park	6,018	2nd
Kilmarnock	Kilmarnock	(Scotland) Andy Gardner	Rugby Park	17,889	4th
Partick Thistle	Glasgow	(Scotland) John Doyle	Petershill Park	1,000	5th
Queen's Park	Glasgow	(Scotland) Mark Kirk	Lesser Hampden	1,000	4th in SWFL 1 South
St Johnstone	Perth	(Scotland) Jason McCrindle	McDiarmid Park	10,696	7th
Stirling University	Stirling	(Scotland) Craig Beveridge	Gannochy Sports Centre	1,000	8th in SWPL 1

== League table ==
Note: Season voided after one match

Pos	Team	Pld	W	D	L	GF	GA	GD	Pts
1	Hamilton Academical	1	1	0	0	5	0	+5	3
2	Dundee United	1	1	0	0	8	4	+4	3
3	St Johnstone	1	1	0	0	4	2	+2	3
4	Partick Thistle	1	1	0	0	2	0	+2	3
5	Kilmarnock	1	0	1	0	1	1	0	1
6	Aberdeen	1	0	1	0	1	1	0	1
7	Queen's Park	1	0	0	1	2	4	−2	0
8	Glasgow Women	1	0	0	1	0	2	−2	0
9	Boroughmuir Thistle	1	0	0	1	4	8	−4	0
10	Stirling University	1	0	0	1	0	5	−5	0

Updated to match(es) played on 23 February 2020. Source:
Rules for classification: 1) Points; 2) Goal difference; 3) Number of goals scored

=== Results ===
Home \ Away	ABE	BOR	DUN	GLW	HAM	KIL	PAR	QPA	STJ	STI
Aberdeen						1–1				
Boroughmuir Thistle										
Dundee United		8–4								
Glasgow Women										
Hamilton Academical										5–0
Kilmarnock										
Partick Thistle				2–0						
Queen's Park									2–4	
St Johnstone										
Stirling University										

Updated to match(es) played on 23 February 2020. Source:
Legend: Blue = home team win; Yellow = draw; Red = away team win.
