= 2025–26 Scottish Women's Premier League 2 =

Scottish women's football league season

Scottish Women's Premier League 2
- Season: 2025–26
- Dates: 17 August 2025 – 17 May 2026
- Champions: Spartans
- Promoted: Spartans
- Relegated: East Fife; Stirling University
- Matches: 132
- Goals: 497 (3.77 per match)

The 2025–26 Scottish Women's Premier League 2, known as the ScottishPower Women's Premier League 2 for sponsorship reasons, was the 11th iteration of the Scottish Women's Premier League 2 (SWPL 2), the second division of women's football in Scotland, and the fourth season organised by the Scottish Professional Football League (SPFL). The season began on 17 August 2025 and concluded on 17 May 2026.

== Format ==
Due to the format changes introduced for the 2025–26 season, the number of teams in the Scottish Women's Premier League 2 increased from eight to 10. The first portion of the season saw each team play every other team twice, once at home and once away (accounting for a total of 18 fixtures). The second round saw the league split (the first occasion using this format in the division), with the top six teams entering the championship round and the bottom four entering the relegation round. Each team then played the others in their round twice again, once at home and once away (account for 10 and eight fixtures, respectively).

In the championship round, the team finishing top was automatically promoted. The club that finished in third place played a single match at home to the team that finished fourth. The team that finished second then played a single home match against the winner of that match. The winner of the match then faced the team that finished ninth in the Scottish Women's Premier League (SWPL) at a neutral venue. In the relegation round, the team that finished bottom was relegated to the Scottish Women's Football Championship (SWFC), and the team that finished ninth played a playoff final against a team from the SWFC (qualifying via the same format as for the SWPL 2 championship round).

== Teams ==
Location of teams in the 2025–26 Scottish Women's Premier League 2 (SWPL 2)

Team	Location	Home ground	Capacity
Boroughmuir Thistle	Edinburgh (Craiglockhart)	Meggetland Sports Complex	4,388
Dundee United	Dundee (Stobswell)	Foundation Park	225
East Fife	Leven	King George V Park	1,000
Gartcairn	Airdrie (Rawyards)	MTC Park	500
Kilmarnock	Kilmarnock (Annanhill)	Rugby Park	15,003
Livingston	Livingston (Kirkton)	Almondvale Stadium	9,713
Queen's Park	Kirkintilloch	Kirkintilloch Community Sports Complex	839
St Johnstone	Perth (Muirton)	Riverside Stadium	1,000
Spartans	Edinburgh (Pilton)	Ainslie Park	3,612
Stirling University	Stirling (University of Stirling)	Gannochy Sports Centre	1,000

== League table ==
Pos	Team	Pld	W	D	L	GF	GA	GD	Pts	Qualification
1	Spartans (C, P)	28	20	5	3	58	9	+49	65	Promotion to the SWPL
2	Kilmarnock	28	20	3	5	85	22	+63	63	Qualification for the promotion/relegation playoffs
3	Boroughmuir Thistle	28	16	6	6	59	22	+37	54	Qualification for the promotion/relegation playoffs
4	Queen's Park	28	16	5	7	65	32	+33	53	Qualification for the promotion/relegation playoffs
5	Dundee United	28	9	8	11	44	41	+3	35	
6	Gartcairn	28	8	5	15	40	51	−11	29	
7	Livingston	24	9	6	9	56	49	+7	33	
8	St Johnstone	24	6	2	16	44	81	−37	20	
9	East Fife (R)	24	5	2	17	28	80	−52	17	Qualification for the promotion/relegation playoffs
10	Stirling University (R)	24	2	0	22	18	110	−92	6	Relegation to the SWFC

Source: Scottish Women's Premier League (SWPL)
Rules for classification: 1) Points; 2) Goal difference; 3) Number of goals scored
(C) Champions; (P) Promoted; (R) Relegated

== Results ==
=== Regular season ===
Home \ Away	BOR	DUN	EFI	GAR	KIL	LIV	QUE	STJ	SPA	STI
Boroughmuir Thistle	—	0–2	3–0	2–1	3–4	2–0	0–1	5–0	1–0	5–0
Dundee United	0–0	—	3–0	3–0	0–5	1–1	4–2	1–1	0–0	4–3
East Fife	0–7	0–7	—	2–3	0–5	2–2	1–7	2–0	1–4	4–0
Gartcairn	1–1	2–0	6–1	—	1–3	1–0	2–4	4–1	0–0	6–0
Kilmarnock	2–0	0–0	6–1	4–0	—	5–0	4–1	6–2	1–0	8–0
Livingston	0–6	2–2	5–0	1–2	0–6	—	1–1	1–1	1–2	6–0
Queen's Park	1–1	2–1	4–1	2–0	0–0	6–0	—	5–0	1–1	6–0
St Johnstone	0–4	3–4	4–2	3–1	2–7	3–7	2–6	—	1–3	5–1
Spartans	0–0	1–0	5–0	2–0	0–1	5–0	2–0	1–0	—	7–0
Stirling University	0–4	0–4	2–1	0–3	0–5	0–3	1–5	1–7	0–3	—

Source: Scottish Women's Premier League (SWPL)
Legend: Blue = home team win; Yellow = draw; Red = away team win.
For upcoming matches, an "a" indicates there is an article about the rivalry between the two participants.

=== Championship round ===
Home \ Away	BOR	DUN	GAR	KIL	QUE	SPA
Boroughmuir Thistle	—	2–0	1–1	3–2	1–1	0–2
Dundee United	2–3	—	1–1	2–2	0–2	0–3
Gartcairn	1–1	0–2	—	0–2	1–2	2–2
Kilmarnock	0–1	2–1	4–0	—	1–0	0–2
Queen's Park	0–1	2–0	2–1	2–0	—	0–4
Spartans	1–0	2–0	3–0	1–0	2–0	—

Source: Scottish Women's Premier League (SWPL)
Legend: Blue = home team win; Yellow = draw; Red = away team win.
For upcoming matches, an "a" indicates there is an article about the rivalry between the two participants.

=== Relegation round ===
Home \ Away	EFI	LIV	STJ	STI
East Fife	—	0–0	2–0	5–1
Livingston	4–0	—	5–0	6–1
St Johnstone	2–1	2–5	—	0–3
Stirling University	0–2	1–6	4–5	—

Source: Scottish Women's Premier League (SWPL)
Legend: Blue = home team win; Yellow = draw; Red = away team win.
For upcoming matches, an "a" indicates there is an article about the rivalry between the two participants.

== Playoffs ==
=== Promotion playoffs ===
==== Bracket ====
Quarter-final
3	Boroughmuir Thistle	0
4	Queen's Park	1

Semi-final
2	Kilmarnock	0
4	Queen's Park	1

Final
9	Aberdeen	5
4	Queen's Park	0

==== Quarter-final ====
20 May 2026
19:15 BST

Boroughmuir Thistle	0–1	Queen's Park
	Report	Thomson 70'

Meadowbank Stadium, Edinburgh
Referee: Konrad Spalony

==== Semi-final ====
24 May 2026
12:00 BST

Kilmarnock	0–1 (a.e.t.)	Queen's Park
	Report	McQuillan 92'

Townhead Park, Cumnock
Referee: Olivia Crawford

==== Final ====
29 May 2026
19:35

Aberdeen	5–0	Queen's Park
Bonner 16' (o.g.); Finnie 25'; McLoughlin 46'; Finnegan 60'; Miller 80'	Report

Excelsior Stadium, Airdrie
Referee: Owen Lawrence

=== Relegation playoff ===
28 May 2025
18:30 BST

East Fife	1–2	Falkirk
Wilson 56'	Report	Murray 13'; McFarlane 69'

Excelsior Stadium, Airdrie
Attendance: 272
Referee: Calum Foreman

== Awards ==
Month	Player of the Month		Other nominated players					
Month	Player	Club	Player	Club	Player	Club	Player	Club
August	(Poland) Natalie Bandura	Spartans	(Scotland) Ellie Kane	Queen's Park	(Scotland) Tara McGonigle	Gartcairn	(Scotland) Abby Robinson	Kilmarnock
September	(Scotland) Cara Gray	Kilmarnock	(Scotland) Ronaigh Douglas	Spartans	(Scotland) Ami Robertson	Boroughmuir Thistle	(Scotland) Sophie Timlin	Gartcairn
October	(Scotland) Ellie Kane	Queen's Park	(Scotland) Eilidh Martin	Kilmarnock	(Scotland) Elvie McLean	St Johnstone	(Scotland) Leah Sidey	Boroughmuir Thistle
November	(Scotland) Abby Robinson	Kilmarnock	(Scotland) Lyla Marnie	Dundee United	(Scotland) Laura McLaughlin	Kilmarnock	(Scotland) Justine Strain	Livingston
December	(Scotland) Rosie McQuillan	Queen's Park	(Northern Ireland) Kaitlyn Canavan	Kilmarnock	(Scotland) Danni Findlay	Dundee United	(Scotland) Ami Robertson	Boroughmuir Thistle
January	(Scotland) Abby Robertson	Kilmarnock	(Scotland) Taylor McGlashan	Kilmarnock	(Scotland) Jess Murphy	Livingston	(Scotland) Summer Thomson	Queen's Park
February	(Scotland) Justine Strain	Livingston	(Scotland) Ciara Bonner	Queen's Park	(Scotland) Eilidh Martin	Kilmarnock	(Scotland) Izzy Young	Spartans
March	(Poland) Natalie Bandura	Spartans	(Scotland) Emily Arthur	Boroughmuir Thistle	(Scotland) Taylor McGlashan	Kilmarnock	(Scotland) Jess Murphy	Livingston
April	(Scotland) Robyn McCafferty	Spartans	(Scotland) Emily Arthur	Boroughmuir Thistle	(Scotland) Sarah Clelland	Spartans	(Scotland) Skye Stout	Kilmarnock
May	(Scotland) Izzy Young	Spartans	(Poland) Natalie Bandura	Spartans	(Scotland) Teri Skivington	East Fife	(Scotland) Justine Strain	Livingston
