= 2020–21 Scottish Women's Premier League 2 =

Scottish Women's Premier League 2
- Season: 2020–21
- Champions: Aberdeen
- Promoted: Aberdeen, Hamilton Academical, Partick Thistle
- Matches played: 92
- Goals scored: 350 (3.8 per match)
- Top goalscorer: Bayley Hutchison (5 goals)
- Biggest home win: Hamilton Academical 8–0 Stirling University (29 November 2020)
- Biggest away win: Boroughmuir Thistle 0–9 Aberdeen (25 October 2020)
- Highest scoring: Boroughmuir Thistle 0–9 Aberdeen (25 October 2020); Aberdeen 8–1 St Johnstone (10 November 2020)
- Longest winning run: Six games: Aberdeen
- Longest unbeaten run: Six games: Aberdeen; Dundee United
- Longest winless run: 11 games: Stirling University
- Longest losing run: Six games: Stirling University
- All statistics correct as of 9 June 2021.

The 2020–21 Scottish Women's Premier League 2 was the sixth season of the SWPL 2 as the second-highest division of women's football in Scotland, below SWPL 1 and above the SWF Championship. The league season was played with ten teams.

The previous season, 2020, was interrupted by the coronavirus pandemic and was subsequently declared null and void. Following this cancellation, Scottish Women's Football reverted to the winter-season format last used in 2008–09. The 2020–21 season was interrupted for more than three months by the pandemic.

Aberdeen won the SWPL 2 title and were promoted alongside runners-up Hamilton Academical. Partick Thistle were later added as a third promoted club, after Forfar Farmington withdrew from the SWPL.

== Teams ==
Locations of teams in the 2020–21 SWPL 2

| Team | Location | Head coach | Home ground | Capacity | 2019 position |
|---|---|---|---|---|---|
| Aberdeen | Aberdeen | (Scotland) Emma Hunter (Scotland) Stuart Bathgate | Cormack Park | | 1st in SWFL 1 North |
| Boroughmuir Thistle | Edinburgh | (Scotland) Suzy Shepherd | Meggetland Sports Complex | 1,000 | 5th in SWFL 1 South |
| Dundee United | Dundee | (Scotland) Gavin Beith | Regional Performance Centre | | 3rd |
| Glasgow Women | Glasgow | (Scotland) Craig Joyce | New Tinto Park | | 6th |
| Hamilton Academical | Hamilton | (Scotland) Gary Doctor | New Douglas Park | 6,018 | 2nd |
| Kilmarnock | Kilmarnock | (Scotland) Andy Gardner | Rugby Park | 17,889 | 4th |
| Partick Thistle | Glasgow | (Scotland) Brian Graham | Lochinch | | 5th |
| Queen's Park | Glasgow | (Scotland) Mark Kirk | Lesser Hampden | 1,000 | 4th in SWFL 1 South |
| St Johnstone | Perth | (Scotland) Jason McCrindle | McDiarmid Park | 10,696 | 7th |
| Stirling University | Stirling | (Scotland) Craig Beveridge | Gannochy Sports Centre | 1,000 | 8th in SWPL 1 |

== League table ==
| Pos | Team | Pld | W | D | L | GF | GA | GD | Pts | Qualification or relegation |
|---|---|---|---|---|---|---|---|---|---|---|
| 1 | Aberdeen | 18 | 16 | 0 | 2 | 76 | 18 | +58 | 48 | Promotion to SWPL 1 |
| 2 | Hamilton Academical | 18 | 12 | 2 | 4 | 49 | 17 | +32 | 38 | Promotion to SWPL 1 |
| 3 | Partick Thistle | 18 | 11 | 2 | 5 | 46 | 22 | +24 | 35 | Later promoted to SWPL 1 |
| 4 | Dundee United | 18 | 10 | 4 | 4 | 44 | 30 | +14 | 34 | |
| 5 | St Johnstone | 18 | 8 | 1 | 9 | 33 | 37 | −4 | 25 | |
| 6 | Glasgow Women | 18 | 6 | 2 | 10 | 24 | 37 | −13 | 20 | |
| 7 | Queen's Park | 18 | 4 | 2 | 12 | 18 | 47 | −29 | 14 | |
| 8 | Kilmarnock | 18 | 7 | 1 | 10 | 19 | 34 | −15 | 22 | |
| 9 | Boroughmuir Thistle | 18 | 4 | 3 | 11 | 24 | 44 | −20 | 15 | |
| 10 | Stirling University | 18 | 2 | 3 | 13 | 17 | 64 | −47 | 9 | To SWPL play-offs (cancelled) |

Updated to match(es) played on 9 June 2021. Source:
Rules for classification: 1) Points; 2) Goal difference; 3) Number of goals scored

== Positions by round ==
| Promotion to 2021–22 SWPL 1 |
| Qualification for the play-offs |

The table lists the positions of teams after each week of matches. In order to preserve chronological progress, any postponed matches are not included in the round at which they were originally scheduled but added to the full round they were played immediately afterwards. For example, if a match is scheduled for matchday 13, but then postponed and played between days 16 and 17, it will be added to the standings for day 16.

| Team ╲ Round | 1 | 2 | 3 | 4 | 5 | 6 | 7 | 8 | 9 | 10 | 11 | 12 | 13 | 14 | 15 | 16 | 17 | 18 |
|---|---|---|---|---|---|---|---|---|---|---|---|---|---|---|---|---|---|---|
| Aberdeen | 4 | 1 | 1 | 1 | 1 | 1 | 1 | 1 | 1 | 1 | 1 | 1 | 1 | 1 | | | | |
| Hamilton Academical | 3 | 2 | 2 | 2 | 2 | 3 | 5 | 4 | 3 | 3 | 2 | 2 | | | | | | |
| Partick Thistle | 2 | 3 | 5 | 7 | 5 | 4 | 2 | 2 | 4 | 4 | 3 | 3 | | | | | | |
| Dundee United | 7 | 7 | 6 | 6 | 8 | 6 | 4 | 3 | 2 | 2 | 4 | 4 | | | | | | |
| St Johnstone | 6 | 5 | 4 | 4 | 4 | 7 | 8 | 7 | 7 | 5 | 5 | 5 | | | | | | |
| Glasgow Women | 1 | 4 | 3 | 3 | 6 | 5 | 6 | 6 | 6 | 7 | 6 | 6 | | | | | | |
| Queen's Park | 9 | 6 | 8 | 8 | 3 | 2 | 3 | 5 | 5 | 6 | 7 | 7 | | | | | | |
| Kilmarnock | 5 | 8 | 7 | 5 | 7 | 8 | 7 | 8 | 8 | 9 | 8 | 8 | | | | | | |
| Boroughmuir Thistle | 8 | 10 | 10 | 10 | 9 | 9 | 9 | 9 | 9 | 8 | 9 | 9 | | | | | | |
| Stirling University | 10 | 9 | 9 | 9 | 10 | 10 | 10 | 10 | 10 | 10 | 10 | 10 | 10 | 10 | | | | |

== Results ==
| Home \ Away | ABE | BOR | DUN | GLW | HAM | KIL | PAR | QPA | STJ | STI |
|---|---|---|---|---|---|---|---|---|---|---|
| Aberdeen | | | 4–3 | | | 3–0 | | 5–1 | 8–1 | 7–0 |
| Boroughmuir Thistle | 0–9 | | 1–2 | | | 0–1 | 1–0 | 1–3 | 3–2 | |
| Dundee United | | 4–1 | | 2–2 | 2–1 | 2–2 | | | | 3–1 |
| Glasgow Women | 0–1 | 3–1 | | | 0–2 | | 1–4 | | | 4–0 |
| Hamilton Academical | 0–1 | 3–1 | | 1–2 | | | | 5–0 | | 8–0 |
| Kilmarnock | 0–5 | 3–1 | 0–4 | 1–0 | 0–3 (Note: Scottish Women's Football awarded Hamilton Academical a technical 3–0 victory after Kilmarnock fielded an ineligible player in their match on 25 October 2020. The match had originally finished 1–0 to Hamilton Academical.) | | 1–2 | | | 2–1 |
| Partick Thistle | 5–1 | 3–1 | 1–1 | 1–0 | 1–3 | | | | 2–3 | |
| Queen's Park | 0–3 | | 3–1 | 2–0 | 0–2 | 2–0 | 0–3 | | 0–3 | |
| St Johnstone | | | 0–1 | 1–3 | 2–2 | 3–0 | 1–3 | 3–0 | | |
| Stirling University | 0–6 | 0–2 | 1–5 | 3–3 | 2–4 | | 1–4 | | 1–2 | |

Updated to match(es) played on 9 June 2021. Source:
Legend: Blue = home team win; Yellow = draw; Red = away team win.

== Statistics ==
=== Scoring ===
As of 17 November 2020

| Rank | Player | Club | Goals |
|---|---|---|---|
| 1 | (Scotland) Bayley Hutchison | Aberdeen | 9 |
| 2 | (Scotland) Francesca Ogilvie | Aberdeen | 4 |
| 2 | (Scotland) Eva Thomson | Aberdeen | 4 |
| 2 | (Scotland) Robyn Smith | Dundee United | 4 |
| 5 | 6 players | | 3 |
