= 2024–25 Scottish Women's Premier League =

Scottish women's football league season

Scottish Women's Premier League
- Season: 2024–25
- Dates: 10 August 2024 – 18 May 2025
- Champions: Hibernian (4th title)
- Relegated: Spartans; Queen's Park; Dundee United
- Champions League: Hibernian; Glasgow City
- Matches: 192
- Goals: 788 (4.1 per match)
- Top goalscorer: (England) Katie Wilkinson (39 Goals)
- All statistics correct as of 18 May 2025.

The 2024–25 season of the Scottish Women's Premier League, also known as ScottishPower Women's Premier League for sponsorship reasons, was the 24th iteration of the top-tier Scottish women's football league, and the third season organised by the Scottish Professional Football League. The division is sometimes referred to as SWPL 1 when distinction from the lower division of the competition, known as SWPL 2, is required.

The season began with the defending champions Celtic hosting Dundee United on 10 August 2024. The final matchday of the regular season was scheduled for 2 March 2025 and the last post-split matchday (32nd game overall) was scheduled for 18 May 2025.

Due to the format changes planned for the 2025–26 season, bringing the number of teams in both the SWPL and SWPL 2 to ten, the 2024–25 season was transitional. The competition format remained unchanged, but no relegation play-off would take place and the three lowest-ranked teams would be relegated to 2025–26 SWPL 2 directly.

For the third season in succession the championship was settled on the final matchday. Challengers Rangers hosted surprise leaders Hibernian at Ibrox Stadium three points behind but with a better goal difference, meaning a victory for the home side would give them the title; however, Hibs won 1–0 to secure their first SWPL title since 2006–07, before the long run of dominance by Glasgow City had begun. The disappointment for Rangers in narrowly missing out on the championship was worsened by being overtaken into second place and qualification for the 2025–26 UEFA Women's Champions League by Glasgow City; holders Celtic had been in contention at the split but finished some way behind in fourth. Rangers gained some revenge over City by defeating them in the 2025 Women's Scottish Cup final (having already also claimed the SWPL Cup by beating Hibs).

At the other end of the table, Dundee United and Queen's Park had seemed doomed for several months and eventually gained only 7 and 12 points respectively. The close battle among the rest of the 'bottom six', particularly between Montrose and Spartans, to avoid becoming the third relegated team was lost by Spartans, who fell out of the top division 21 years after joining the league in 2004 as Whitehill Welfare; in the 2020s they had gradually lost ground to Heart of Midlothian as Hibernian's rivals in Edinburgh.

== Teams ==
Locations of teams in the 2024–25 SWPL.

Team	Location	Manager	Home ground	Capacity	2023–24 finish
Aberdeen	Cove Bay	(Scotland) Scott Booth	Balmoral Stadium	2,602	8th
Celtic	Airdrie	(Sweden) Elena Sadiku	Excelsior Stadium	10,101	1st
Dundee United	Dundee	(Scotland) Suzy Shepherd	Foundation Park	225	11th
Glasgow City	Springburn	(Scotland) Leanne Ross	Petershill Park	1,000	3rd
Heart of Midlothian	Edinburgh	(Spain) Eva Olid	Oriam	1,000	4th
Hibernian	Edinburgh	(Scotland) Grant Scott	Meadowbank Stadium	1,320	5th
Montrose	Montrose	(Scotland) Craig Feroz	Links Park	4,936	9th
Motherwell	Motherwell	(Scotland) Paul Brownlie	K-Park	500	7th
Partick Thistle	Springburn	(Scotland) Brian Graham	Petershill Park	1,000	6th
Queen's Park	Glasgow	(Scotland) Craig Joyce	New Tinto Park	1,000	1st (SWPL 2)
Rangers	Cumbernauld	(England) Jo Potter	Broadwood Stadium	8,086	2nd
Spartans	Edinburgh	(Scotland) Jack Beesley	Ainslie Park	3,000	10th

=== Team changes ===
Entering league	Exiting league
Promoted from 2023–24 SWPL 2	Relegated to 2024–25 SWPL 2
Queen's Park	Hamilton Academical

== Regular season ==
Pos	Team	Pld	W	D	L	GF	GA	GD	Pts	Qualification
1	Glasgow City	22	17	3	2	90	10	+80	54	Advances to the championship round
2	Hibernian	22	17	3	2	71	14	+57	54	Advances to the championship round
3	Rangers	22	16	4	2	112	18	+94	52	Advances to the championship round
4	Celtic	22	16	3	3	82	15	+67	51	Advances to the championship round
5	Heart of Midlothian	22	14	4	4	73	14	+59	46	Advances to the championship round
6	Motherwell	22	10	2	10	51	46	+5	32	Advances to the championship round
7	Partick Thistle	22	5	9	8	29	39	−10	24	Participates in the relegation round
8	Aberdeen	22	6	3	13	20	81	−61	21	Participates in the relegation round
9	Spartans	22	5	2	15	23	58	−35	17	Participates in the relegation round
10	Montrose	22	4	2	16	22	82	−60	14	Participates in the relegation round
11	Queen's Park	22	2	2	18	10	101	−91	8	Participates in the relegation round
12	Dundee United	22	1	1	20	14	119	−105	4	Participates in the relegation round

Updated to match(es) played on 2 March 2025. Source: SWPL.uk
Rules for classification: 1) Points; 2) Goal difference; 3) Number of goals scored;

=== Results ===
Home \ Away	ABE	CEL	DUN	GLA	HEA	HIB	MON	MOT	PAR	QUE	RAN	SPA
Aberdeen		0–4	1–1	0–5	0–2	1–7	2–0	0–6	0–0	3–0	0–11	1–0
Celtic	8–0		9–0	1–0	4–0	0–0	5–1	5–1	4–2	5–0	2–3	1–0
Dundee United	1–2	0–8		0–13	0–8	0–5	1–3	1–6	0–4	2–3	0–10	1–2
Glasgow City	6–1	2–2	7–0		2–1	3–0	8–0	4–0	3–0	8–0	3–0	6–0
Heart of Midlothian	3–0	1–0	9–0	0–0		0–1	6–0	6–1	1–1	6–0	0–2	5–0
Hibernian	7–0	1–0	6–0	3–1	0–4		5–1	4–0	1–1	6–1	1–1	6–0
Montrose	1–2	2–4	2–1	0–7	0–3	0–2		0–4	1–1	1–0	0–9	0–3
Motherwell	4–2	0–4	4–1	0–1	0–0	0–5	3–2		0–4	6–1	0–1	4–1
Partick Thistle	2–2	0–3	4–1	0–2	0–3	1–2	3–3	1–1		2–0	0–6	1–1
Queen's Park	0–2	0–6	1–2	1–6	1–11	0–2	0–3	0–6	0–0		0–14	1–0
Rangers	10–0	2–2	6–1	1–1	2–2	0–3	10–2	2–0	4–0	9–0		6–1
Spartans	3–1	0–5	6–1	0–2	0–2	0–4	3–0	1–5	1–2	1–1	0–3	

Updated to match(es) played on 2 March 2025. Source: SWPL.uk
Legend: Blue = home team win; Yellow = draw; Red = away team win.

== Championship round ==
Pos	Team	Pld	W	D	L	GF	GA	GD	Pts	Qualification
1	Hibernian (C)	32	24	5	3	90	21	+69	77	Qualification for the Champions League second qualifying round
2	Glasgow City	32	23	5	4	107	18	+89	74	Qualification for the Champions League second qualifying round
3	Rangers	32	22	5	5	139	27	+112	71	
4	Celtic	32	19	5	8	97	30	+67	62	
5	Heart of Midlothian	32	18	5	9	91	32	+59	59	
6	Motherwell	32	10	2	20	52	86	−34	32	

Updated to match(es) played on 18 May 2025. Source: SWPL.uk
Rules for classification: 1) Points; 2) Goal difference; 3) Number of goals scored;
(C) Champions

=== Results ===
Home \ Away	GLA	HIB	RAN	CEL	HEA	MOT
Glasgow City		0–1	1–2	3–1	2–0	4–0
Hibernian	2–2		2–0	4–2	1–2	2–0
Rangers	0–1	0–1		1–1	4–0	6–0
Celtic	1–2	0–0	0–1		2–1	6–0
Heart of Midlothian	0–0	1–3	3–5	3–1		2–0
Motherwell	1–2	0–3	0–8	0–1	0–6	

Updated to match(es) played on 18 May 2025. Source: SWPL.uk
Legend: Blue = home team win; Yellow = draw; Red = away team win.

== Relegation round ==
Pos	Team	Pld	W	D	L	GF	GA	GD	Pts	Relegation
1	Partick Thistle	32	11	9	12	41	50	−9	42	
2	Aberdeen	32	12	5	15	46	94	−48	41	
3	Montrose	32	11	4	17	43	90	−47	37	
4	Spartans (R)	32	11	3	18	43	70	−27	36	Relegation to 2025–26 SWPL 2
5	Queen's Park (R)	32	3	3	26	16	124	−108	12	Relegation to 2025–26 SWPL 2
6	Dundee United (R)	32	2	1	29	23	146	−123	7	Relegation to 2025–26 SWPL 2

Updated to match(es) played on 18 May 2025. Source: SWPL.uk
Rules for classification: 1) Points; 2) Goal difference; 3) Number of goals scored;
(R) Relegated

=== Results ===
Home \ Away	PAR	ABE	SPA	MON	QUE	DUN
Partick Thistle		1–2	1–0	0–1	2–0	1–0
Aberdeen	2–0		2–4	2–2	5–2	2–0
Spartans	1–2	1–1		3–2	2–0	1–0
Montrose	2–0	3–2	2–1		4–0	4–0
Queen's Park	0–1	0–3	0–2	0–0		1–2
Dundee United	3–4	0–5	2–5	0–1	2–3	

Updated to match(es) played on 18 May 2025. Source: SWPL.uk
Legend: Blue = home team win; Yellow = draw; Red = away team win.

== Awards ==
=== Player of the Month ===
Month	Player	Team	Source
August	(Scotland) Abbie Ferguson	Hibernian	
September	(Scotland) Laura Berry	Rangers/Motherwell	
October	(Scotland) Erin Husband	Heart of Midlothian	
November	(Scotland) Hannah Jordan	Spartans	
December	(Scotland) Kathleen McGovern	Hibernian	
January	(Scotland) Eilidh Adams	Hibernian	
February	(Scotland) Maria McAneny	Celtic	
March	(Scotland) Kirsty Howat	Rangers	
April	(Scotland) Kathleen McGovern	Hibernian	
May	(Scotland) Kathleen McGovern	Hibernian	

=== Goal of the Month ===
Month	Player	Team	Against	Source
August	(Scotland) Tiree Burchill	Partick Thistle	Spartans	
September	(Scotland) Jade McLaren	Montrose	Dundee United	
October	(Scotland) Neve Guthrie	Montrose	Partick Thistle	
November	(Scotland) Chelsea Cornet	Rangers	Celtic	
December	(Scotland) Kathleen McGovern	Hibernian	Rangers	
January	(Scotland) Lucie Burns	Kilmarnock	Gartcairn	
February	(Scotland) Maria McAneny	Celtic	Glasgow City	
March	(Scotland) Rosie McQuillan	Queen's Park	Dundee United	
April	(Scotland) Eva Thomson	Aberdeen	Queen's Park	
May	(Scotland) Cara Gray	Kilmarnock	Livingston	

== Top goalscorers ==
As of 18 May 2025

Rank	Player	Team	Goals
1	(England) Katie Wilkinson	Rangers	39
2	(Republic of Ireland) Saoirse Noonan	Celtic	25
3	(Scotland) Kathleen McGovern	Hibernian	25
4	(Scotland) Eilidh Adams	Hibernian	24
5	(England) Rio Hardy	Rangers	22
6	(Ukraine) Nicole Kozlova	Glasgow City	21
7	(Scotland) Laura Berry	Rangers/Motherwell	18
8	(United States) Brenna Lovera	Glasgow City	18
9	(Scotland) Bayley Hutchison	Heart of Midlothian	16
10	(Scotland) Kirsty Howat	Rangers	14
11	(Scotland) Maria McAneny	Celtic	13
12	(Scotland) Hannah Jordan	Spartans	13
13	(Jamaica) Olufolasade Adamolekun	Heart of Midlothian	12
14	(Poland) Natalia Wróbel	Glasgow City	11
15	(Scotland) Carla Boyce	Partick Thistle	11
16	(England) Georgia Timms	Heart of Midlothian	10
