= 2025–26 in Scottish football =

Football in Scotland
- Season: 2025–26

2025–26 in Scottish football
- Premiership champions
- Celtic
- Championship champions
- St Johnstone
- League 1 champions
- Inverness Caledonian Thistle
- League 2 champions
- East Kilbride
- Scottish Cup winners
- Celtic
- League Cup winners
- St Mirren
- Challenge Cup winners
- Raith Rovers
- Youth Cup winners
- Heart of Midlothian
- Teams in Europe
- Celtic, Rangers, Aberdeen, Hibernian, Dundee United
- Scotland national team
- 2026 FIFA World Cup qualification (UEFA)

The 2025–26 season was the 129th season of competitive football in Scotland. The domestic season began on the weekend of 11–13 July with the first Scottish League Cup group stage matches, and the first round of matches in the 2025–26 Scottish Premiership were played on the weekend of 1–3 August.

== League competitions ==
=== Scottish Premiership ===
| Pos | Team | Pld | W | D | L | GF | GA | GD | Pts | Qualification or relegation (Note: Teams played each other three times (33 matches), before the league was split into two groups (the top six and the bottom six).) |
|---|---|---|---|---|---|---|---|---|---|---|
| 1 | Celtic (C) | 38 | 26 | 4 | 8 | 73 | 41 | +32 | 82 | Qualification for the Champions League play-off round |
| 2 | Heart of Midlothian | 38 | 24 | 8 | 6 | 67 | 34 | +33 | 80 | Qualification for the Champions League second qualifying round |
| 3 | Rangers | 38 | 20 | 12 | 6 | 76 | 43 | +33 | 72 | Qualification for the Europa League third qualifying round (Note: Since the 2025–26 Scottish Cup winners, Celtic, qualified for the Champions League via league position, the spot reserved for the cup winners (Europa League third qualifying round) was passed to the third-placed team, and the spots for the Conference League second qualifying round were moved down one league position.) |
| 4 | Motherwell | 38 | 16 | 13 | 9 | 59 | 36 | +23 | 61 | Qualification for the Conference League second qualifying round |
| 5 | Hibernian | 38 | 15 | 12 | 11 | 58 | 44 | +14 | 57 | Qualification for the Conference League second qualifying round |
| 6 | Falkirk | 38 | 14 | 7 | 17 | 50 | 62 | −12 | 49 | |
| 7 | Dundee United | 38 | 10 | 15 | 13 | 49 | 60 | −11 | 45 | |
| 8 | Dundee | 38 | 11 | 9 | 18 | 42 | 61 | −19 | 42 | |
| 9 | Aberdeen | 38 | 11 | 7 | 20 | 40 | 55 | −15 | 40 | |
| 10 | Kilmarnock | 38 | 10 | 10 | 18 | 50 | 68 | −18 | 40 | |
| 11 | St Mirren (O) | 38 | 8 | 10 | 20 | 30 | 55 | −25 | 34 | Qualification for the Premiership play-off final |
| 12 | Livingston (R) | 38 | 2 | 15 | 21 | 40 | 75 | −35 | 21 | Relegation to Championship |

Rules for classification: 1) Points; 2) Goal difference; 3) Goals scored; 4) Head-to-head points; 5) Head-to-head goal difference; 6) Play-off (only if deciding champion, UEFA competition qualification, second stage group allocation, or relegation).
(C) Champions; (O) Play-off winners; (R) Relegated

=== Scottish Championship ===
| Pos | Team | Pld | W | D | L | GF | GA | GD | Pts | Promotion, qualification or relegation |
|---|---|---|---|---|---|---|---|---|---|---|
| 1 | St Johnstone (C, P) | 36 | 22 | 11 | 3 | 67 | 25 | +42 | 77 | Promotion to the Premiership |
| 2 | Partick Thistle | 36 | 17 | 15 | 4 | 53 | 36 | +17 | 66 | Qualification for the Premiership play-off semi-final |
| 3 | Arbroath | 36 | 13 | 13 | 10 | 43 | 41 | +2 | 52 | Qualification for the Premiership play-off quarter-final |
| 4 | Dunfermline Athletic | 36 | 14 | 9 | 13 | 52 | 41 | +11 | 51 | Qualification for the Premiership play-off quarter-final |
| 5 | Raith Rovers | 36 | 12 | 9 | 15 | 43 | 42 | +1 | 45 | |
| 6 | Queen's Park | 36 | 9 | 14 | 13 | 35 | 48 | −13 | 41 | |
| 7 | Ayr United | 36 | 8 | 15 | 13 | 38 | 47 | −9 | 39 | |
| 8 | Greenock Morton | 36 | 8 | 14 | 14 | 36 | 52 | −16 | 38 | |
| 9 | Airdrieonians (R) | 36 | 8 | 12 | 16 | 35 | 49 | −14 | 36 | Qualification for the Championship play-offs |
| 10 | Ross County (R) | 36 | 8 | 10 | 18 | 36 | 57 | −21 | 34 | Relegation to League One |

Rules for classification: 1) Points; 2) Goal difference; 3) Goals scored; 4) Head-to head points; 5) Head-to-head goal difference; 6) Play-off (only for deciding promotion, play-off participation and relegation).
(C) Champions; (P) Promoted; (R) Relegated

=== Scottish League One ===
| Pos | Team | Pld | W | D | L | GF | GA | GD | Pts | Promotion, qualification or relegation |
|---|---|---|---|---|---|---|---|---|---|---|
| 1 | Inverness Caledonian Thistle (C, P) | 36 | 21 | 11 | 4 | 60 | 24 | +36 | 69 (Note: Inverness Caledonian Thistle were deducted five points for entering administration during the previous season.) | Promotion to the Championship |
| 2 | Stenhousemuir (O, P) | 36 | 18 | 13 | 5 | 50 | 27 | +23 | 67 | Qualification for the Championship play-offs |
| 3 | Queen of the South | 36 | 14 | 12 | 10 | 58 | 47 | +11 | 54 | Qualification for the Championship play-offs |
| 4 | Alloa Athletic | 36 | 15 | 8 | 13 | 50 | 38 | +12 | 53 | Qualification for the Championship play-offs |
| 5 | Peterhead | 36 | 12 | 7 | 17 | 48 | 64 | −16 | 43 | |
| 6 | Montrose | 36 | 11 | 9 | 16 | 48 | 67 | −19 | 42 | |
| 7 | Cove Rangers | 36 | 9 | 11 | 16 | 41 | 44 | −3 | 38 | |
| 8 | East Fife | 36 | 9 | 9 | 18 | 34 | 61 | −27 | 36 | |
| 9 | Hamilton Academical (O) | 36 | 16 | 7 | 13 | 54 | 42 | +12 | 34 (Note: Hamilton Academical were deducted six points for breaching SPFL rules regarding amateur players, a further nine points for failing to hold at least a bronze level licence and then six more points for failing to pay players' wages on time.) | Qualification for the League One play-offs |
| 10 | Kelty Hearts (R) | 36 | 6 | 11 | 19 | 33 | 62 | −29 | 29 | Relegation to League Two |

Rules for classification: 1) Points; 2) Goal difference; 3) Goals scored; 4) Head-to-head points; 5) Head-to-head goal difference; 6) Play-off (only for deciding promotion, play-off participation and relegation).
(C) Champions; (O) Play-off winners; (P) Promoted; (R) Relegated

=== Scottish League Two ===
| Pos | Team | Pld | W | D | L | GF | GA | GD | Pts | Promotion, qualification or relegation |
|---|---|---|---|---|---|---|---|---|---|---|
| 1 | East Kilbride (C, P) | 36 | 21 | 6 | 9 | 77 | 46 | +31 | 69 | Promotion to League One |
| 2 | The Spartans | 36 | 18 | 10 | 8 | 60 | 39 | +21 | 64 | Qualification for the League One play-offs |
| 3 | Clyde | 36 | 14 | 14 | 8 | 58 | 41 | +17 | 56 | Qualification for the League One play-offs |
| 4 | Forfar Athletic | 36 | 13 | 11 | 12 | 51 | 47 | +4 | 50 | Qualification for the League One play-offs |
| 5 | Stranraer | 36 | 12 | 11 | 13 | 46 | 46 | 0 | 47 | |
| 6 | Elgin City | 36 | 11 | 11 | 14 | 51 | 55 | −4 | 44 | |
| 7 | Annan Athletic | 36 | 10 | 11 | 15 | 47 | 58 | −11 | 41 | |
| 8 | Stirling Albion | 36 | 9 | 11 | 16 | 46 | 63 | −17 | 38 | |
| 9 | Dumbarton | 36 | 10 | 10 | 16 | 47 | 61 | −14 | 35 (Note: Dumbarton were deducted five points for entering administration during the previous season.) | |
| 10 | Edinburgh City (O) | 36 | 10 | 9 | 17 | 45 | 72 | −27 | 24 (Note: Edinburgh City were deducted 15 points due to an insolvency event.) | Qualification for the League Two play-off final |

Rules for classification: 1) Points; 2) Goal difference; 3) Goals scored; 4) Head-to-head points; 5) Head-to-head goal difference; 6) Play-off (only for deciding promotion, play-off participation and relegation).
(C) Champions; (O) Play-off winners; (P) Promoted

=== Non-league football ===
==== Level 5 ====
Highland Football League
| Pos | Team | Pld | Pts |
|---|---|---|---|
| 1 | Brora Rangers (C) | 34 | 75 |
| 2 | Brechin City | 34 | 74 |
| 3 | Formartine United | 34 | 71 |
| 4 | Fraserburgh | 34 | 68 |
| 5 | Clachnacuddin | 34 | 61 |
| 6 | Banks o' Dee | 34 | 58 |
| 7 | Keith | 34 | 58 |
| 8 | Buckie Thistle | 34 | 53 |
| 9 | Nairn County | 34 | 49 |
| 10 | Turriff United | 34 | 48 |
| 11 | Huntly | 34 | 43 |
| 12 | Forres Mechanics | 34 | 40 |
| 13 | Strathspey Thistle | 34 | 38 |
| 14 | Deveronvale | 34 | 37 |
| 15 | Inverurie Loco Works | 34 | 30 |
| 16 | Wick Academy | 34 | 28 |
| 17 | Lossiemouth | 34 | 17 |
| 18 | Rothes | 34 | 7 |

(C) Champions

Lowland Football League
| Pos | Team | Pld | Pts |
|---|---|---|---|
| 1 | Linlithgow Rose (C) | 34 | 75 |
| 2 | Clydebank | 34 | 73 |
| 3 | Bonnyrigg Rose | 34 | 69 |
| 4 | Tranent | 34 | 67 |
| 5 | Caledonian Braves | 34 | 59 |
| 6 | Cumbernauld Colts | 34 | 56 |
| 7 | Broxburn Athletic | 34 | 52 |
| 8 | Berwick Rangers | 34 | 49 |
| 9 | Bo'ness United | 34 | 48 |
| 10 | Celtic B | 34 | 46 |
| 11 | Cowdenbeath | 34 | 45 |
| 12 | Gala Fairydean Rovers | 34 | 41 |
| 13 | Albion Rovers | 34 | 39 |
| 14 | Civil Service Strollers | 34 | 38 |
| 15 | University of Stirling | 34 | 34 |
| 16 | Heart of Midlothian B | 34 | 29 |
| 17 | Gretna 2008 | 34 | 28 |
| 18 | East Stirlingshire | 34 | 18 |

Source: SLFL BBC Sport Soccerway
(C) Champions

==== Level 6 ====
===== Highland =====
North Caledonian Football League
| Pos | Team | Pld | Pts |
|---|---|---|---|
| 1 | Invergordon (C, P) | 22 | 63 |
| 2 | Alness United | 22 | 46 |
| 3 | Inverness Athletic | 22 | 43 |
| 4 | Thurso | 22 | 32 |
| 5 | Golspie Sutherland | 22 | 32 |
| 6 | Fort William | 21 | 31 |
| 7 | Inverness Thistle | 22 | 26 |
| 8 | Clachnacuddin 'A' | 22 | 23 |
| 9 | Halkirk United | 21 | 22 |
| 10 | Bonar Bridge | 22 | 22 |
| 11 | St Duthus | 22 | 20 |
| 12 | Orkney | 22 | 15 |

Source: North Caledonian Football League
(C) Champions;
(P) Promoted

2025–26 North of Scotland Football League

===== Lowland =====
East of Scotland Football League
| Pos | Team | Pld | Pts |
|---|---|---|---|
| 1 | Hill of Beath Hawthorn (C, P) | 30 | 67 |
| 2 | Musselburgh Athletic (P) | 30 | 66 |
| 3 | Dunipace (P) | 30 | 65 |
| 4 | Camelon Juniors | 30 | 62 |
| 5 | Jeanfield Swifts | 30 | 59 |
| 6 | Bo'ness Athletic | 30 | 51 |
| 7 | Haddington Athletic | 30 | 48 |
| 8 | Dunbar United | 30 | 44 |
| 9 | Penicuik Athletic | 30 | 44 |
| 10 | St Andrews United | 30 | 43 |
| 11 | Newtongrange Star | 30 | 30 |
| 12 | Whitburn | 30 | 29 |
| 13 | Dundonald Bluebell | 30 | 29 |
| 14 | Sauchie Juniors | 30 | 21 |
| 15 | Glenrothes (R) | 30 | 15 |
| 16 | Hutchison Vale (R) | 30 | 11 |

(C) Champions;
(P) Promoted;
(R) Relegated

Midlands Football League
| Pos | Team | Pld | Pts |
|---|---|---|---|
| 1 | Dundee North End (C) | 36 | 92 |
| 2 | Broughty Athletic | 36 | 74 |
| 3 | Downfield | 36 | 72 |
| 4 | Tayport | 36 | 71 |
| 5 | Lochee United (P) | 36 | 69 |
| 6 | Carnoustie Panmure | 36 | 55 |
| 7 | East Craigie | 36 | 32 |
| 8 | Kirriemuir Thistle | 36 | 30 |
| 9 | Lochee Harp | 36 | 22 |
| 10 | Letham | 36 | 4 |

(C) Champions;
(P) Promoted

South of Scotland Football League
| Pos | Team | Pld | Pts |
|---|---|---|---|
| 1 | Dalbeattie Star (C, P) | 20 | 52 |
| 2 | Stranraer reserves | 20 | 50 |
| 3 | Lochar Thistle | 20 | 46 |
| 4 | Newton Stewart (P) | 20 | 44 |
| 5 | Creetown | 20 | 27 |
| 6 | Abbey Vale | 20 | 27 |
| 7 | Lochmaben | 20 | 23 |
| 8 | Mid-Annandale | 20 | 15 |
| 9 | Nithsdale Wanderers | 20 | 13 |
| 10 | Wigtown & Bladnoch | 20 | 10 |
| 11 | St Cuthbert Wanderers | 20 | 8 |

Source: South of Scotland Football League
(C) Champions;
(P) Promoted

West of Scotland Football League
| Pos | Team | Pld | Pts |
|---|---|---|---|
| 1 | Auchinleck Talbot (C, P) | 30 | 70 |
| 2 | Cumnock Juniors (P) | 30 | 64 |
| 3 | Troon (P) | 30 | 62 |
| 4 | Pollok (P) | 30 | 47 |
| 5 | Largs Thistle (P) | 30 | 46 |
| 6 | Johnstone Burgh (P) | 30 | 44 |
| 7 | Kilwinning Rangers (P) | 30 | 43 |
| 8 | Arthurlie | 30 | 43 |
| 9 | Hurlford United | 30 | 43 |
| 10 | Renfrew (P) | 30 | 42 |
| 11 | Beith Juniors (P) | 30 | 40 |
| 12 | Drumchapel United | 30 | 39 |
| 13 | Glenafton Athletic | 30 | 36 |
| 14 | Shotts Bon Accord | 30 | 30 |
| 15 | Rutherglen Glencairn | 30 | 29 |
| 16 | St Cadoc's | 30 | 9 |

(C) Champions;
(P) Promoted

== Honours ==
=== Cup honours ===
| Competition | Winner | Score | Runner-up | Match report |
|---|---|---|---|---|
| 2025–26 Scottish Cup | Celtic | 3–1 | Dunfermline Athletic | BBC Sport |
| 2025–26 League Cup | St Mirren | 3–1 | Celtic | BBC Sport |
| 2025–26 Challenge Cup | Raith Rovers | 4–1 | Inverness Caledonian Thistle | BBC Sport |
| 2025–26 South Challenge Cup | Cumnock Juniors | 2–0 | University of Stirling | Cumnock Chronicle |
| 2025–26 Youth Cup | Heart of Midlothian | 4–0 | Queen's Park | Scottish FA |
| 2025–26 Communities Cup | Auchinleck Talbot | 2–1 | Largs Thistle | BBC Sport |

=== Non-league honours ===
| Level | Competition | Winner |
|---|---|---|
| 5 | Highland League | Brora Rangers |
| 5 | Lowland League | Linlithgow Rose |
| 6 | North Caledonian League | Invergordon |
| 6 | North of Scotland League Premier Division | Stonehaven |
| 6 | East of Scotland League Premier Division | Hill of Beath Hawthorn |
| 6 | Midlands Premier League | Dundee North End |
| 6 | South of Scotland League | Dalbeattie Star |
| 6 | West of Scotland League Premier Division | Auchinleck Talbot |
| 7 | North of Scotland League Championship | Fraserburgh United |
| 7 | East of Scotland League First Division | Armadale Thistle |
| 7 | Midlands First Division | Dundee Violet |
| 7 | West of Scotland League First Division | Irvine Meadow |
| 8 | East of Scotland League Second Division | West Calder United |
| 8 | West of Scotland League Second Division | Bellshill Athletic |
| 9 | East of Scotland League Third Division | Hawick Royal Albert |
| 9 | West of Scotland League Third Division | Craigmark Burntonians |
| 10 | West of Scotland League Fourth Division | East Kilbride YM |

=== Individual honours ===
==== PFA Scotland awards ====
| Award | Winner | Team |
|---|---|---|
| Players' Player of the Year | Cláudio Braga | Heart of Midlothian |
| Young Player of the Year | Mikey Moore | Rangers |
| Manager of the Year | Derek McInnes | Heart of Midlothian |
| Championship Player | Josh McPake | St Johnstone |
| League One Player | Oli Shaw | Hamilton Academical |
| League Two Player | John Robertson | East Kilbride |

==== SFWA awards ====
| Award | Winner | Team |
|---|---|---|
| Footballer of the Year | Cláudio Braga | Heart of Midlothian |
| Young Player of the Year | Barney Stewart | Falkirk |
| Manager of the Year | Derek McInnes | Heart of Midlothian |

== Scottish clubs in Europe ==
=== Summary ===
| Club | Competitions | Started round | Final round | Coef. |
|---|---|---|---|---|
| Celtic | UEFA Champions League | Play-off round | Play-off round | 12.000 |
| Celtic | UEFA Europa League | League phase | Knockout phase play-offs | 12.000 |
| Rangers | UEFA Champions League | Second qualifying round | Play-off round | 5.500 |
| Rangers | UEFA Europa League | League phase | League phase | 5.500 |
| Aberdeen | UEFA Europa League | Play-off round | Play-off round | 2.500 |
| Aberdeen | UEFA Conference League | League phase | League phase | 2.500 |
| Hibernian | UEFA Europa League | Second qualifying round | Second qualifying round | 2.000 |
| Hibernian | UEFA Conference League | Third qualifying round | Play-off round | 2.000 |
| Dundee United | UEFA Conference League | Second qualifying round | Third qualifying round | 3.000 |
| Total | | | | 25.000 |
| Average | | | | 5.000 |

=== Celtic ===
UEFA Champions League

Having won the 2024–25 Scottish Premiership, Celtic entered the Champions League in the play-off round.

| 20 August 2025 PO | Celtic (Scotland) | 0–0 | (Kazakhstan) Kairat | Glasgow |
| | | Report | | Stadium: Celtic Park; Attendance: 56,182; Referee: Espen Eskås (Norway) |

| 26 August 2025 PO | Kairat (Kazakhstan) | 0–0 (a.e.t.) (0–0 agg.) (3–2 p) | (Scotland) Celtic | Almaty |
| | | Report | | Stadium: Central Stadium; Attendance: 22,800; Referee: Maurizio Mariani (Italy) |
| | Penalties |
| | Gromyko (penalty missed); Martynovich (penalty scored); Arad (penalty scored); Sorokin (penalty scored) | | (penalty missed) Idah; (penalty missed) McCowan; (penalty scored) Engels; (penalty scored) McGregor; (penalty missed) Maeda |

UEFA Europa League

| 24 September 2025 Matchday 1 | Red Star Belgrade (Serbia) | 1–1 | (Scotland) Celtic | Belgrade, Serbia |
| 21:00 CEST | Arnautović 65' | Report | Iheanacho 55' | Stadium: Red Star Stadium; Attendance: 35,721; Referee: Radu Petrescu (Romania) |

| 2 October 2025 Matchday 2 | Celtic (Scotland) | 0–2 | (Portugal) Braga | Glasgow |
| 17:45 BST | | Report | Horta 20'; Martínez 85' | Stadium: Celtic Park; Attendance: 46,232; Referee: Tobias Stieler (Germany) |

| 23 October 2025 Matchday 3 | Celtic (Scotland) | 2–1 | (Austria) Sturm Graz | Glasgow |
| 20:00 BST | Scales 61'; Nygren 64' | Report | Horvat 15' | Stadium: Celtic Park; Attendance: 48,278; Referee: Juan Martínez Munuera (Spain) |

| 6 November 2025 Matchday 4 | Midtjylland (Denmark) | 3–1 | (Scotland) Celtic | Herning, Denmark |
| 18:45 CET | Erlić 33'; Gogorza 35'; Djú 41' | Report | Hatate 81' (pen.) | Stadium: MCH Arena; Attendance: 10,387; Referee: Nenad Minaković (Serbia) |

| 27 November 2025 Matchday 5 | Feyenoord (Netherlands) | 1–3 | (Scotland) Celtic | Rotterdam, Netherlands |
| 18:45 CET | Ueda 11' | Report | Yang 31'; Hatate 43'; Nygren 82' | Stadium: De Kuip; Attendance: 31,582; Referee: Sebastian Gishamer (Austria) |

| 11 December 2025 Matchday 6 | Celtic (Scotland) | 0–3 | (Italy) Roma | Glasgow |
| 20:00 GMT | | Report | Scales 6' (o.g.); Ferguson 36', 45+1' | Stadium: Celtic Park; Attendance: 56,188; Referee: István Kovács (Romania) |

| 22 January 2026 Matchday 7 | Bologna (Italy) | 2–2 | (Scotland) Celtic | Bologna, Italy |
| 18:45 CET | Dallinga 58'; Rowe 72' | Report | Hatate 6'; Trusty 40' | Stadium: Stadio Renato Dall'Ara; Attendance: 23,791; Referee: Vassilis Fotias (Greece) |

| 29 January 2026 Matchday 8 | Celtic (Scotland) | 4–2 | (Netherlands) Utrecht | Glasgow |
| 20:00 GMT | Nygren 6'; Viergever 10' (o.g.); Engels 19' (pen.); Trusty 66' | Report | de Wit 44'; Blake 62' | Stadium: Celtic Park; Attendance: 55,559; Referee: Mohammad Al-Emara (Finland) |

| 19 February 2026 Knockout Play-off | Celtic (Scotland) | 1–4 | (Germany) VfB Stuttgart | Glasgow |
| 20:00 GMT | Nygren 21' | Report | El Khannouss 15', 28'; Leweling 57'; Tomás 90+3' | Stadium: Celtic Park; Attendance: 52,901; Referee: Erik Lambrechts (Belgium) |

| 26 February 2026 Knockout play-off | VfB Stuttgart (Germany) | 0–1 (4–2 agg.) | (Scotland) Celtic | Stuttgart, Germany |
| 18:45 CET | | Report | McCowan 1' | Stadium: MHPArena; Attendance: 58,500; Referee: Irfan Peljto (Bosnia and Herzegovina) |

=== Rangers ===
UEFA Champions League

Having finished second in the 2024–25 Scottish Premiership, Rangers entered the Champions League in the second qualifying round.

| 22 July 2025 QR2 | Rangers (Scotland) | 2–0 | (Greece) Panathinaikos | Glasgow |
| | Curtis 52'; Gassama 78' | Report | | Stadium: Ibrox Stadium; Attendance: 49,548; Referee: Donatas Rumsas (Lithuania) |

| 30 July 2025 QR2 | Panathinaikos (Greece) | 1–1 (1–3 agg.) | (Scotland) Rangers | Athens |
| | Duricic 53' | Report | Gassama 60' | Stadium: Leoforos Alexandras Stadium; Attendance: 36,121; Referee: Simone Sozza (Italy) |

| 5 August 2025 QR3 | Rangers (Scotland) | 3–0 | (Czech Republic) Viktoria Plzeň | Glasgow |
| | Gassama 15', 51'; Dessers 45' (pen.) | Report | | Stadium: Ibrox Stadium; Attendance: 45,730; Referee: Clément Turpin (France) |

| 12 August 2025 QR3 | Viktoria Plzeň (Czech Republic) | 2–1 (2–4 agg.) | (Scotland) Rangers | Plzeň |
| | Durosinmi 41'; Marković 83' | Report | Cameron 60' | Stadium: Doosan Arena; Attendance: 11,341; Referee: Szymon Marciniak (Poland) |

| 19 August 2025 PO | Rangers (Scotland) | 1–3 | (Belgium) Club Brugge | Glasgow |
| | Danilo 50' | Report | Vermant 3'; Spileers 7'; Mechele 20' | Stadium: Ibrox Stadium; Attendance: 43,731; Referee: François Letexier (France) |

| 27 August 2025 PO | Club Brugge (Belgium) | 6–0 (9–1 agg.) | (Scotland) Rangers | Bruges |
| | Tresoldi 5'; Vanaken 32'; Seys 41', 45'; Stanković 45+2'; Tzolis 50' | Report | | Stadium: Jan Breydel Stadium; Referee: Felix Zwayer (Germany) |

=== Aberdeen ===
UEFA Europa League

Having won the 2024–25 Scottish Cup, Aberdeen entered the Europa League in the play-off round.

| 21 August 2025 PO | Aberdeen (Scotland) | 2–2 | (Romania) FCSB | Aberdeen |
| | Polvara 61'; Sokler 89' | Report | Birligea 32'; Olaru 46' | Stadium: Pittodrie Stadium; Attendance: 17,551; Referee: Serdar Gözübüyük (Netherlands) |

| 28 August 2025 PO | FCSB (Romania) | 3–0 (5–2 agg.) | (Scotland) Aberdeen | Bucharest |
| | Olaru 45+1' (pen.), 59'; Sut 52' | Report | | Stadium: Arena Națională; Referee: Espen Eskås (Norway) |

UEFA Conference League

| 2 October 2025 1 | Aberdeen (Scotland) | 2–3 | (Ukraine) Shakhtar Donetsk | Pittodrie Stadium |
| 20:00 | Karlsson 8' (pen.); Devlin 69' | Report | Nazaryna 38'; Ferreira 54'; Henrique 59' | Attendance: 15,504; Referee: Duje Strukan |

| 23 October 2025 2 | AEK Athens (Greece) | 6–0 | (Scotland) Aberdeen | Agia Sophia Stadium |
| 18:45 | Koïta 11', 18'; Eliasson 27'; Marin 55'; Jović 81'; Kutesa 87' | Report | | Attendance: 20,921; Referee: Jasper Vergoote |

| 6 November 2025 3 | AEK Larnaca (Cyprus) | 0–0 | (Scotland) Aberdeen | AEK Arena – Georgios Karapatakis |
| 18:45 | | Report | | Attendance: 4,770; Referee: Dalibor Cerny |

| 27 November 2025 4 | Aberdeen (Scotland) | 1–1 | (Armenia) Noah | Pittodrie Stadium |
| 20:00 | Nisbet 45' | Report | Mulahusejnović 52' | Attendance: 15,060; Referee: Paweł Raczkowski |

| 11 December 2025 5 | Aberdeen (Scotland) | 0–1 | (France) Strasbourg | Pittodrie Stadium |
| 20:00 | | Report | Godo 35' | Attendance: 15,404; Referee: Robert Schröder |

| 18 December 2025 6 | Sparta Prague (Czech Republic) | 3–0 | (Scotland) Aberdeen | Stadion Letná |
| 20:00 | Mercado 16'; Haraslín 29'; Kuol 66' | Report | | Attendance: 14,343; Referee: David Smajc |

=== Hibernian ===
UEFA Europa League

Having finished third in the 2024–25 Scottish Premiership, Hibernian entered the Europa League in the second qualifying round.

| 24 July 2025 QR2 | Midtjylland (Denmark) | 1–1 | (Scotland) Hibernian | Herning |
| | Şimşir 72' | Report | McGrath 7' | Stadium: MCH Arena; Attendance: 8,863; Referee: Robert Schröder (Germany) |

| 31 July 2025 QR2 | Hibernian (Scotland) | 1–2 (a.e.t.) (2–3 agg.) | (Denmark) Midtjylland | Edinburgh |
| | Bushiri 105+1' | Report | Osorio 94'; Júnior Brumado 119' | Stadium: Easter Road; Attendance: 19,536; Referee: Gustavo Correia (Portugal) |

UEFA Conference League

| 7 August 2025 Third qualifying round | FK Partizan (Serbia) | 0–2 | (Scotland) Hibernian | Belgrade |
| | | Report | Boyle 40', 70' (pen.) | Stadium: Partizan Stadium; Attendance: 26,342; Referee: Philip Farrugia (Malta) |

| 14 August 2025 Third qualifying round | Hibernian (Scotland) | 2–3 (a.e.t.) (4–3 agg.) | (Serbia) FK Partizan | Edinburgh |
| | Bowie 59'; Cadden 100' | Report | Vukotić 17'; Milosevic 44'; Kostić 90+5' | Stadium: Easter Road; Attendance: 19,377; Referee: Radoslav Gidzhenov (Bulgaria) |

| 21 August 2025 Play-off round | Hibernian (Scotland) | 1–2 | (Poland) Legia Warsaw | Edinburgh |
| | Mulligan 86' | Report | Nsame 35' (pen.); Wszolek 45+3' | Stadium: Easter Road; Attendance: 18,958; Referee: Mohammad Al-Emara (Finland) |

| 28 August 2025 Play-off round | Legia Warsaw (Poland) | 3–3 (a.e.t.) (5–4 agg.) | (Scotland) Hibernian | Warsaw |
| | Bichakhchyan 13'; Elitim 90+3'; Rajovic 98' | Report | Bushiri 50'; Boyle 59'; Chaiwa 61' | Stadium: Polish Army Stadium; Referee: Lawrence Visser (Belgium) |

=== Dundee United ===
UEFA Conference League

Having finished fourth in the 2024–25 Scottish Premiership, Dundee United entered the Conference League in the second qualifying round.

| 24 July 2025 QR2 | Dundee United (Scotland) | 1–0 | (Luxembourg) UNA Strassen | Dundee |
| | Sapsford 47' | Report | | Stadium: Tannadice Park; Referee: Marc Nagtegaal (Netherlands) |

| 31 July 2025 QR2 | UNA Strassen (Luxembourg) | 0–1 (0–2 agg.) | (Scotland) Dundee United | Differdange |
| | | Report | Iovu 63' | Stadium: Stade Municipal; Referee: Vilhjálmur Thórarinsson (Iceland) |

| 7 August 2025 Third qualifying round | Rapid Vienna (Austria) | 2–2 | (Scotland) Dundee United | Vienna |
| | Dahl 27'; Seidl 44' | Report | Watters 33'; Sapsford 75' | Stadium: Allianz Stadion; Referee: Luís Miguel Branco Godinho (Portugal) |

| 14 August 2025 Third qualifying round | Dundee United (Scotland) | 2–2 (a.e.t.) (4–4 agg.) (4–5 p) | (Austria) Rapid Vienna | Dundee |
| | Watters 25', 42' (pen.) | Report | Iovu 63' (o.g.); Kara 77' | Stadium: Tannadice Park; Referee: Anastasios Sidiropoulos (Cyprus) |
| | Penalties |
| | Fatah (penalty missed); Ferry (penalty scored); Esselink (penalty scored); Ševelj (penalty scored); Keresztes (penalty scored) | | (penalty scored) Kara; (penalty scored) Mbuyi; (penalty scored) Radulović; (penalty scored) Raux-Yao; (penalty scored) Bolla |

== Scotland national team ==
By winning their qualification group, Scotland reached their ninth World Cup finals (their first since 1998).

| 5 September 2025 2026 World Cup qualification | Denmark | 0–0 | Scotland | Copenhagen |
| | | Report | | Stadium: Parken Stadium; Attendance: 35,369; Referee: Daniel Siebert (Germany) |

| 8 September 2025 2026 World Cup qualification | Belarus | 0–2 | Scotland | Zalaegerszeg, Hungary |
| | | Report | Adams 43'; Volkov 65' (o.g.) | Stadium: ZTE Arena; Attendance: None; Referee: Nikola Dabanovic (Montenegro) |

| 9 October 2025 2026 World Cup qualification | Scotland | 3–1 | Greece | Glasgow |
| | Christie 64'; Ferguson 80'; Dykes 90+3' | Report | Tsimikas 62' | Stadium: Hampden Park; Attendance: 46,006; Referee: Espen Eskås (Norway) |

| 12 October 2025 2026 World Cup qualification | Scotland | 2–1 | Belarus | Glasgow |
| | Adams 15'; McTominay 84' | Report | Kuchko 90+6' | Stadium: Hampden Park; Attendance: 49,346; Referee: Marian Barbu (Romania) |

| 15 November 2025 2026 World Cup qualification | Greece | 3–2 | Scotland | Piraeus |
| | Bakasetas 7'; Karetsas 57'; Tzolis 63' | Report | Gannon-Doak 65'; Christie 70' | Stadium: Karaiskakis Stadium; Attendance: 18,405; Referee: Jesús Gil Manzano (Spain) |

| 18 November 2025 2026 World Cup qualification | Scotland | 4–2 | Denmark | Glasgow |
| | McTominay 3'; Shankland 78'; Tierney 90+3'; McLean 90+8' | Report | Højlund 57' (pen.); Dorgu 81' | Stadium: Hampden Park; Attendance: 49,587; Referee: Szymon Marciniak (Poland) |

| 28 March 2026 Friendly | Scotland | 0–1 | Japan | Glasgow |
| | | Report | Itō 84' | Stadium: Hampden Park; Attendance: 44,644; Referee: Shaun Evans (Australia) |

| 31 March 2026 Friendly | Ivory Coast | 1–0 | Scotland | Liverpool |
| | Pépé 12' | Report | | Stadium: Hill Dickinson Stadium; Attendance: 33,034; Referee: Daniel Elder (Australia) |

| 30 May 2026 Friendly | Scotland | 4–1 | Curaçao | Glasgow |
| | Curtis 45+2'; Shankland 59', 64'; Christie 81' (pen.) | Report | Chong 17' | Stadium: Hampden Park; Attendance: 44,433; Referee: Goga Kikacheishvili (Georgia) |

| 6 June 2026 Friendly | Bolivia | 0–4 | Scotland | Harrison, New Jersey |
| | | Report | Shankland 5'; McTominay 23'; Adams 30', 45' | Stadium: Sports Illustrated Stadium; Referee: Rosendo Mendoza (United States) |

| 13 June 2026 2026 World Cup | Haiti | 1–0 | Scotland | Foxborough, Massachusetts |
| | McGinn 28' | Report | | Stadium: Gillette Stadium; Attendance: 64,146; Referee: Mustapha Ghorbal (Algeria) |

| 19 June 2026 2026 World Cup | Scotland | 0–1 | Morocco | Foxborough, Massachusetts |
| | | Report | Saibari 2' | Stadium: Gillette Stadium; Attendance: 64,146; Referee: Ilgiz Tantashev (Uzbekistan) |

| 24 June 2026 2026 World Cup | Scotland | 0–3 | Brazil | Miami Gardens, Florida |
| | | Report | Vinícius 7', 45+3'; Cunha 60' | Stadium: Hard Rock Stadium; Attendance: 64,478; Referee: César Arturo Ramos (Mexico) |

== Women's football ==
=== League and Cup honours ===
| Division | Winner |
|---|---|
| 2025–26 SWPL 1 | Heart of Midlothian |
| 2025–26 SWPL 2 | Spartans |
| 2025–26 SWF Championship (North) | |
| 2025–26 SWF Championship (South) | |

| Competition | Winner | Score | Runner-up | Match report |
|---|---|---|---|---|
| Scottish Women's Cup | Celtic | 1–0 | Rangers | BBC Sport |
| Scottish Women's Premier League Cup | Glasgow City | 2–1 | Rangers | BBC Sport |
| SWFL First Division Cup | | | | |
| SWFL Second Division Cup | | | | |

=== Individual honours ===
==== SWPL awards ====
| Award | Winner | Team |
|---|---|---|
| Players' Player of the Year | | |
| Player of the Year | Nicole Kozlova | Glasgow City |
| Manager of the Year | Eva Olid | Heart of Midlothian |
| Young Player of the Year | May Cruft | Rangers |

=== Scotland women's national team ===
| 24 October 2025 Friendly match | Morocco | 1–2 | Scotland | Casablanca |
| | Nakkach 80' | Report | Cuthbert 41'; Weir 90' | Stadium: Père Jégo Stadium; Referee: Natacha Konan (Ivory Coast) |

| 28 October 2025 Friendly match | Scotland | 3–4 | Switzerland | Dunfermline |
| | McGovern 35'; Reuteler 45+2' (o.g.); Weir 90+3' | Report | Schertenleib 24', 52'; Beney 41'; Vallotto 72' | Stadium: East End Park; Referee: Abigail Byrne (England) |

| 28 November 2025 Friendly match | Ukraine | 1–1 | Scotland | Jerez de la Frontera, Spain |
| 12:00 UTC+1 | Kravchuk 38' | Report | McAneny 90+6' | Stadium: Estadio Municipal de Chapín; Referee: Gabriela Arce (Paraguay) |

| 2 December 2025 Friendly match | Scotland | 3–2 | China | Jerez de la Frontera, Spain |
| 19:00 UTC+1 | Howat 11', 15'; Hanson 14' | Report | Zhang Linyan 30'; Wu Chengshu 60' | Stadium: Estadio Municipal de Chapín; Referee: María Eugenia Gil Soriano |

| 3 March 2026 2027 WCQ | Luxembourg | 0–5 | Scotland | Esch |
| | | Report | Weir 9', 37', 61'; Clark 27'; McGovern 88' | Stadium: Stade Émile Mayrisch; Referee: Kristina Georgieva |

| 7 March 2026 2027 WCQ | Scotland | 7–0 | Luxembourg | Glasgow |
| | McGovern 1', 31'; Clark 10', 55'; Davidson 78'; Lawton 89'; McAneny 90+4' | Report | | Stadium: Hampden Park; Attendance: 4,266; Referee: Nanna Løf Andersen |

| 14 April 2026 2027 WCQ | Scotland | 1–1 | Belgium | Edinburgh |
| | McGovern 90+5' | Report | Kees 15' | Stadium: Easter Road; Attendance: 4,522; Referee: Lotta Vuorio |

| 18 April 2026 2027 WCQ | Belgium | 0–0 | Scotland | Leuven |
| | | Report | | Stadium: Den Dreef; Attendance: 4,052; Referee: Reka Molnar |

| 5 June 2026 2027 WCQ | Scotland | 6–0 | Israel | Budapest |
| | Cuthbert 17'; Weir 20', 57', 67' (pen.); Davidson 81'; Hanson 86' | Report | | Stadium: Bozsik Aréna; Attendance: None; Referee: Déborah Anex (Switzerland) |

| 9 June 2026 2027 WCQ | Israel | 1–5 | Scotland | Budapest |
| | Kats 56' | Report | Weir 16', 70' (pen.), 79', 90'; Clark 37' | Stadium: Bozsik Aréna; Attendance: None; Referee: Karoline Marie Jensen (Norway) |

== Deaths ==
- 22 July: John Fallon, 84, Celtic and Motherwell goalkeeper
- 12 August: Rikki Fleming, 78, Ayr United, Hibernian and Berwick Rangers defender
- 14 August: Sammy Johnston, 58, St Johnstone, Ayr United, Partick Thistle and Stranraer midfielder
- 21 August: Rod Petrie, 69, Hibernian chairman and Scottish Football Association president
- 1 September: Jimmy Bone, 75, Partick Thistle, Celtic, Arbroath, St Mirren, Hearts and Scotland forward; Arbroath, Airdrie, St Mirren, East Fife and Stenhousemuir manager.
- 3 September: Bobby Graham, 80, Motherwell and Hamilton Academical forward.
- 13 September: Eddie Hunter, 82, Queen's Park player and manager.
- 13 September: George Sievwright, 88, Dundee United wing half.
- 24 October: Bob Wilson, 91, Aberdeen wing half.
- 31 October: Willie Young, 73, Aberdeen defender.
- 26 November: Tommy Murray, 82, Airdrie, Hearts, Arbroath and Raith Rovers forward.
- 9 December: Dixie Deans, 79, Motherwell, Celtic, Partick Thistle and Scotland forward.
- 23 December: Jimmy Miller, 72, Aberdeen, Queen of the South, Motherwell, Morton, Clyde and Albion Rovers midfielder.
- 25 December: John Robertson, 72, Scotland midfielder.
- January: Bobby Holmes, 93, St Mirren forward.
- 10 January: Willie Allan, 83, Aberdeen, St Mirren, Falkirk, Morton, Cowdenbeath and Alloa Athletic forward.
- 12 January: Eddie McCreadie, 85, East Stirlingshire and Scotland defender.
- 19 January: Roy Erskine, 94, Stirling Albion and Cowdenbeath defender.
- 5 February: Tommy McMillan, 81, Aberdeen and Falkirk defender.
- 27 February: John Markie, 81, Falkirk, Clyde and Stenhousemuir defender.
- 13 March: Gordon Wallace, 82, Montrose, Raith Rovers, Dundee and Dundee United forward; Raith Rovers and Dundee manager.
- 15 March: Jim Fleeting, 70, Ayr United, Clyde and Morton defender; Stirling Albion, Kilmarnock and Scotland (women) manager.
- 27 March: Alex Cropley, 75, Hibernian and Scotland midfielder.
- 30 March: Willie Watson, 76, Motherwell and Dundee defender.
- April: Quintin Young, 78, Ayr United, Rangers and East Fife winger.
- May: Mike Galloway, 60, Hearts, Celtic and Scotland midfielder.
- May: Jim Irvine, 85, Dundee United and Hearts forward.
