= 2024–25 Scottish Women's Premier League 2 =

Scottish women's football league season

Scottish Women's Premier League 2
- Season: 2024–25
- Dates: 11 August 2024 – 18 May 2025
- Champions: Hamilton Academical
- Relegated: Ayr United, Rossvale (via playoff)
- Matches: 112
- Goals: 468 (4.18 per match)
- Biggest home win: Hamilton Academical 8–0 Rossvale; 5 January 2025
- Biggest away win: St Johnstone 0–7 Hamilton Academical; 15 September 2024; Ayr United 1–8 Kilmarnock; 6 October 2024
- Highest scoring: Kilmarnock 6–3 Livingston; 22 September 2024; Ayr United 1–8 Kilmarnock; 6 October 2024
- All statistics correct as of 18 May 2025.

The 2024–25 Scottish Women's Premier League 2 (SWPL), also known as ScottishPower Women's Premier League 2 for sponsorship reasons, was the 10th iteration of the second-tier Scottish women's football league, and the 3rd season organised by Scottish Professional Football League. The season ran between 11 August 2024 and 18 May 2025.

Due to the format changes planned for the 2025–26 season, which would bring the number of teams in both SWPL and SWPL 2 to ten, the 2024–25 season was transitional. The competition format remained unchanged, but there would be no promotion play-off in the 2024–25 season. The relegation to the Scottish Women's Football Championship remained unchanged.

Having been relegated the previous season, Hamilton Academical won the league and were promoted back to the Scottish Women's Premier League. Kilmarnock were again second but missed out on the chance of promotion as there was no promotion playoff in this season. At the other end of the league, of the two teams to be promoted from the Scottish Women's Football Championship WFC the previous season, Ayr United faced immediate relegation back and Rossvale were relegated after losing the SWPL2 Play-off Final to Stirling University, who had themselves been relegated the previous season.

Like the SWPL, the SWPL 2 introduced new silverware for the 2024-25 season, manufactured by London silversmiths Thomas Lyte.

== Teams ==
Locations of teams in the 2024–25 SWPL 2.

=== Team changes ===
Entering league		Exiting league	
Promoted from 2023–24 WFC	Relegated from 2023–24 SWPL	Promoted to 2024–25 SWPL	Relegated to 2024–25 WFC
Ayr United; Rossvale	Hamilton Academical	Queen's Park	Glasgow Women; Stirling University

== League table ==
Pos	Team	Pld	W	D	L	GF	GA	GD	Pts	Qualification or relegation
1	Hamilton Academical (C, P)	28	21	2	5	103	28	+75	65	Promotion to SWPL1
2	Kilmarnock	28	19	4	5	87	38	+49	61	
3	Boroughmuir Thistle	28	18	4	6	62	30	+32	58	
4	Gartcairn	28	12	5	11	62	44	+18	41	
5	Livingston	28	10	4	14	46	68	−22	34	
6	St Johnstone	28	9	3	16	40	79	−39	30	
7	Rossvale (Q, R)	28	4	5	19	36	89	−53	17	Qualification for the SWPL2 Play-off Final
8	Ayr United (R)	28	3	5	20	32	92	−60	14	Relegation to the SWF Championship

Updated to match(es) played on 18 May 2025. Source:
Rules for classification: 1) Points; 2) Goal difference; 3) Number of goals scored
(C) Champions; (P) Promoted; (Q) Qualified for the phase indicated; (R) Relegated

== Results ==
=== Matches 1–14 ===
Home \ Away	AYR	BOR	GAR	HAM	KIL	LIV	ROS	STJ
Ayr United		0–1	3–1	1–7	1–8	0–2	3–1	2–4
Boroughmuir Thistle	7–1		1–3	0–2	1–0	2–3	1–0	5–1
Gartcairn	4–0	3–2		2–3	1–3	1–1	7–1	3–0 (Note: 2–1 Awarded 3–0 for playing a trialist without notification.)
Hamilton Academical	3–0	2–3	2–0		1–1	6–2	8–0	6–1
Kilmarnock	3–0	0–0	3–1	0–4		6–3	4–1	6–1
Livingston	3–0	2–0	1–0	0–3	0–3		5–2	2–0
Rossvale	1–1	0–2	2–3	0–3	4–1	5–2		1–1
St Johnstone	4–1	0–0	1–2	0–7	0–5	1–2	2–5	

Updated to match(es) played on 5 February 2025. Source:
Legend: Blue = home team win; Yellow = draw; Red = away team win.

=== Matches 15–28 ===
Home \ Away	AYR	BOR	GAR	HAM	KIL	LIV	ROS	STJ
Ayr United		0–2	4–4	2–2	0–2	1–3	0–1	2–3
Boroughmuir Thistle	6–0		3–2	3–1	2–2	2–2	2–0	2–1
Gartcairn	3–4	3–1		0–1	0–0	4–0	7–0	2–0
Hamilton Academical	6–0	1–2	4–0		5–2	5–1	5–1	6–0
Kilmarnock	5–2	1–4	2–1	2–1		4–0	3–1	6–2
Livingston	1–1	0–1	0–3	2–3	0–6		5–1	1–4
Rossvale	2–2	0–2	2–2	1–5	0–6	2–2		0–2
St Johnstone	3–1	0–5	0–0	2–1	2–3	2–1	3–2	

Updated to match(es) played on 5 May 2025. Source:
Legend: Blue = home team win; Yellow = draw; Red = away team win.

== Relegation play-off ==
The team that finishes in 7th plays a single match play-off against the runners-up of the 2024–25 Women's Football Championship for a spot in the 2025–26 edition.

23 May 2025
19.30 BST (UTC+1)

Rossvale	0–1	Stirling University

Excelsior_Stadium
