= 2019 Scottish Women's Premier League 2 =

Scottish Women's Premier League 2
- Season: 2019
- Champions: Heart of Midlothian
- Promoted: Heart of Midlothian
- Matches played: 84
- Goals scored: 398 (4.74 per match)
- Top goalscorer: Dionne Brown; Lisa Swanson (15 goals)
- Biggest home win: Hamilton Academical 19–0 Hutchison Vale (20 October 2019)
- Biggest away win: Hutchison Vale 0–17 Hamilton Academical (19 May 2019)
- Highest scoring: Hamilton Academical 19–0 Hutchison Vale (20 October 2019)
- Longest winning run: 5 matches: Hamilton Academical
- Longest unbeaten run: 9 matches: Heart of Midlothian
- Longest winless run: 21 matches: Hutchison Vale
- Longest losing run: 21 matches: Hutchison Vale
- All statistics correct as of 18 November 2019.

The 2019 Scottish Women's Premier League 2 was the fourth season of the SWPL 2 as the second-highest division of women's football in Scotland, below SWPL 1 and above SWFL 1.

Dundee United and Partick Thistle joined SWPL 2 as the promoted clubs from the Scottish Women's Football League First Division, replacing Aberdeen and Central Girls. Fixtures for the 2019 SWPL 2 season were announced on 21 December 2018.

Heart of Midlothian became champions of SWPL 2 and won promotion to the top flight. No teams were relegated as the league was expanded from eight teams to ten. 2019 was the last full season played on a summer calendar in Scottish women's football.

== Teams ==
Locations of teams in the 2019 SWPL 2

| Team | Location | Home ground | Capacity | 2018 position |
|---|---|---|---|---|
| Dundee United | Dundee | GA Engineering Arena | 1,000 | 1st in SWFL 1 North |
| F.C. Kilmarnock | Kilmarnock | Rugby Park | 17,889 | 2nd |
| Glasgow Girls | Glasgow | Petershill Park | 1,000 | 6th |
| Hamilton Academical | Hamilton | New Douglas Park | 6,018 | 8th in SWPL 1 |
| Heart of Midlothian | Edinburgh | Oriam | 1,000 | 3rd |
| Hutchison Vale | Edinburgh | Saughton Enclosure | 1,000 | 5th |
| Partick Thistle | Glasgow | Petershill Park | 1,000 | 1st in SWFL 1 South |
| St Johnstone | Perth | McDiarmid Park | 10,696 | 4th |

Source: Scottish Women's Premier League

== Personnel ==
| Team | Head coach |
|---|---|
| Dundee United | (Scotland) Gavin Beith |
| F.C. Kilmarnock | (Scotland) Stewart Hall |
| Glasgow Girls | (Scotland) John Doyle |
| Hamilton Academical | (Scotland) Gary Doctor |
| Heart of Midlothian | (Scotland) Andy Enwood |
| Hutchison Vale | (Scotland) Scott Patterson |
| Partick Thistle | (Scotland) James McCafferty |
| St Johnstone | (Scotland) Jason McCrindle |

Source: Scottish Women's Premier League

== League table ==
| Pos | Team | Pld | W | D | L | GF | GA | GD | Pts | Qualification or relegation |
|---|---|---|---|---|---|---|---|---|---|---|
| 1 | Heart of Midlothian (C) | 21 | 14 | 5 | 2 | 70 | 14 | +56 | 47 | Promotion to SWPL 1 |
| 2 | Hamilton Academical | 21 | 12 | 5 | 4 | 84 | 19 | +65 | 41 | |
| 3 | Dundee United | 21 | 10 | 4 | 7 | 46 | 30 | +16 | 34 | |
| 4 | F.C. Kilmarnock | 21 | 9 | 6 | 6 | 48 | 28 | +20 | 33 | |
| 5 | Partick Thistle | 21 | 8 | 6 | 7 | 44 | 27 | +17 | 30 | |
| 6 | Glasgow Girls | 21 | 8 | 4 | 9 | 50 | 28 | +22 | 28 | |
| 7 | St Johnstone | 21 | 6 | 4 | 11 | 50 | 35 | +15 | 22 | |
| 8 | Hutchison Vale | 21 | 0 | 0 | 21 | 9 | 220 | −211 | 0 | |

Updated to match(es) played on 18 November 2019. Source:
Rules for classification: 1) Points; 2) Goal difference; 3) Number of goals scored
(C) Champions

== Positions by round ==
| Champions; Promotion to 2020 SWPL 1 |

The table lists the positions of teams after each week of matches. In order to preserve chronological progress, any postponed matches are not included in the round at which they were originally scheduled but added to the full round they were played immediately afterwards. For example, if a match is scheduled for matchday 13, but then postponed and played between days 16 and 17, it will be added to the standings for day 16.

| Team ╲ Round | 1 | 2 | 3 | 4 | 5 | 6 | 7 | 8 | 9 | 10 | 11 | 12 | 13 | 14 | 15 | 16 | 17 | 18 | 19 | 20 | 21 |
|---|---|---|---|---|---|---|---|---|---|---|---|---|---|---|---|---|---|---|---|---|---|
| Heart of Midlothian | 1 | 1 | 1 | 1 | 1 | 2 | 1 | 1 | 2 | 2 | 1 | 2 | 2 | 2 | 1 | 1 | 1 | 1 | 1 | 1 | 1 |
| Hamilton Academical | 8 | 6 | 6 | 3 | 2 | 1 | 3 | 3 | 1 | 1 | 2 | 1 | 1 | 1 | 2 | 2 | 2 | 2 | 2 | 2 | 2 |
| Dundee United | 2 | 3 | 3 | 5 | 6 | 6 | 4 | 4 | 3 | 3 | 6 | 6 | 6 | 6 | 4 | 6 | 6 | 6 | 6 | 6 | 3 |
| F.C. Kilmarnock | 7 | 5 | 4 | 2 | 5 | 7 | 7 | 7 | 5 | 5 | 5 | 5 | 5 | 5 | 6 | 4 | 4 | 4 | 4 | 4 | 4 |
| Partick Thistle | 5 | 4 | 5 | 4 | 4 | 4 | 5 | 5 | 6 | 6 | 3 | 3 | 3 | 4 | 5 | 3 | 3 | 3 | 3 | 3 | 5 |
| Glasgow Girls | 4 | 2 | 2 | 6 | 3 | 3 | 2 | 2 | 4 | 4 | 4 | 4 | 4 | 3 | 3 | 5 | 5 | 5 | 5 | 5 | 6 |
| St Johnstone | 3 | 7 | 7 | 7 | 7 | 5 | 6 | 6 | 7 | 7 | 7 | 7 | 7 | 7 | 7 | 7 | 7 | 7 | 7 | 7 | 7 |
| Hutchison Vale | 6 | 8 | 8 | 8 | 8 | 8 | 8 | 8 | 8 | 8 | 8 | 8 | 8 | 8 | 8 | 8 | 8 | 8 | 8 | 8 | 8 |

== Results ==
=== Matches 1 to 14 ===
| Home \ Away | DUN | KIL | GLG | HAM | HOM | HUT | PAR | STJ |
|---|---|---|---|---|---|---|---|---|
| Dundee United | | 2–0 | 1–1 | 0–2 | 1–0 | 10–1 | 0–2 | 1–1 |
| F.C. Kilmarnock | 1–1 | | 2–0 | 0–1 | 0–6 | 3–0 (Note: Hutchison Vale were fined £1,000 for failing to fulfil their fixture against Kilmarnock on 28 April 2019. The match was awarded to Kilmarnock with a 3–0 scoreline. Initially, half of the fine was suspended but a second failure to fulfil a fixture made them liable to pay the rest.) | 2–0 | 2–3 |
| Glasgow Girls | 2–0 | 2–3 | | 1–1 | 1–2 | 7–0 | 0–0 | 3–1 |
| Hamilton Academical | 2–1 | 4–2 | 3–0 | | 1–2 | 12–0 | 2–0 | 1–1 |
| Heart of Midlothian | 0–1 | 1–1 | 3–1 | 3–1 | | 9–0 | 1–1 | 1–1 |
| Hutchison Vale | 0–9 | 1–14 | 0–12 | 0–17 | 0–11 | | 0–11 | 0–7 |
| Partick Thistle | 2–1 | 0–0 | 0–1 | 1–1 | 1–4 | 5–0 | | 1–0 |
| St Johnstone | 1–2 | 0–2 | 0–2 | 1–2 | 0–2 | 14–0 | 2–3 | |

Updated to match(es) played on 23 October 2019. Source:
Legend: Blue = home team win; Yellow = draw; Red = away team win.

=== Matches 15 to 21 ===
| Home \ Away | DUN | KIL | GLG | HAM | HOM | HUT | PAR | STJ |
|---|---|---|---|---|---|---|---|---|
| Dundee United | | | | 2–2 | 0–2 | | | 3–2 |
| F.C. Kilmarnock | 4–0 | | 1–1 | 1–0 | 1–1 | | | |
| Glasgow Girls | 2–3 | | | 0–5 | | 12–0 | 2–0 | |
| Hamilton Academical | | | | | 2–2 | 19–0 | | 5–0 |
| Heart of Midlothian | | | 2–0 | | | 14–1 (Note: Hutchison Vale were fined £1,200 (£600 suspended) for failing to fulfil their fixture against Heart of Midlothian on 22 September 2019. The match was initially awarded to Heart of Midlothian with a 3–0 scoreline, however, they subsequently appealed the decision and the match was played Sunday, November 10.) | 3–0 | 1–0 |
| Hutchison Vale | 3–6 | 2–7 | | | | | 1–11 | |
| Partick Thistle | 0–2 | 1–1 | | 2–1 | | | | |
| St Johnstone | | 2–1 | 1–0 | | | 10–0 | 3–3 | |

Updated to match(es) played on 18 November 2019. Source:
Legend: Blue = home team win; Yellow = draw; Red = away team win.

== Statistics ==
=== Scoring ===
| Rank | Player | Club | Goals |
|---|---|---|---|
| 1 | (Scotland) Dionne Brown | Hamilton Academical | 15 |
| 1 | (Scotland) Lisa Swanson | Kilmarnock | 15 |
| 3 | (Scotland) Neve Guthrie | Dundee United | 14 |
| 4 | (Scotland) Chloe Docherty | Glasgow Girls | 12 |
| 4 | (Scotland) Lucy McEwan | Glasgow Girls | 12 |
| 4 | (Scotland) Nichola Sturrock | Hamilton Academical | 12 |
| 4 | (Scotland) Jade McDonald | St Johnstone | 12 |
| 8 | (Scotland) Rachel Walkingshaw | Heart of Midlothian | 11 |

=== Hat-tricks ===
| No. | Player | For | Against | Date | Score | Ref |
|---|---|---|---|---|---|---|
| 1 | (Scotland) Ashley Carse | Heart of Midlothian | Hutchison Vale | 17 February 2019 | 9–0 | |
| 2 | (Scotland) Nichola Sturrock | Hamilton Academical | Hutchison Vale | 17 March 2019 | 12–0 | |
| 3 | (Scotland) Chloe Docherty | Glasgow Girls | Hutchison Vale | 31 March 2019 | 7–0 | |
| 4 | (Scotland) Lucy McEwan | Glasgow Girls | Hutchison Vale | 31 March 2019 | 7–0 | |
| 5 | (Scotland) Neve Guthrie | Dundee United | Hutchison Vale | 17 April 2019 | 9–0 | |
| 6 | (Scotland) Jade McDonald^{4} | St Johnstone | Hutchison Vale | 21 April 2019 | 14–0 | |
| 7 | (Scotland) Ashley Fish^{4} | St Johnstone | Hutchison Vale | 21 April 2019 | 14–0 | |
| 8 | (Scotland) Dionne Brown^{4} | Hamilton Academical | Hutchison Vale | 19 May 2019 | 17–0 | |
| 9 | (Scotland) Colette Fleming^{4} | Kilmarnock | Hutchison Vale | 26 May 2019 | 14–1 | |
| 10 | (Scotland) Lisa Swanson^{6} | Kilmarnock | Hutchison Vale | 26 May 2019 | 14–1 | |
| 11 | (Scotland) Suzanne MacTaggart^{4} | Partick Thistle | Hutchison Vale | 2 June 2019 | 11–0 | |
| 12 | (Scotland) Taylor Fisher^{6} | Glasgow Girls | Hutchison Vale | 4 August 2019 | 12–0 | |
| 13 | (Scotland) Neve Guthrie | Dundee United | Hutchison Vale | 15 September 2019 | 10–1 | |
| 14 | (Scotland) Catriona Caine | Dundee United | Hutchison Vale | 15 September 2019 | 10–1 | |
| 15 | (Scotland) Mhairi Lyle | Partick Thistle | Hutchison Vale | 29 September 2019 | 11–1 | |
| 16 | (Scotland) Marie Gardiner^{4} | Hamilton Academical | Hutchison Vale | 20 October 2019 | 19–0 | |
| 17 | (Scotland) Tegan McCann | Hamilton Academical | Hutchison Vale | 20 October 2019 | 19–0 | |
| 18 | (Scotland) Kirstin McGuire | Glasgow Girls | Hutchison Vale | 27 October 2019 | 12–0 | |
| 19 | (Scotland) Taylor Fisher | Glasgow Girls | Hutchison Vale | 27 October 2019 | 12–0 | |
| 20 | (Scotland) Lucy McEwan | Glasgow Girls | Hutchison Vale | 27 October 2019 | 12–0 | |
| 21 | (Scotland) Dannielle McGinley | Heart of Midlothian | Hutchison Vale | 10 November 2019 | 14–1 | |
| 22 | (Scotland) Rachel Walkingshaw | Heart of Midlothian | Hutchison Vale | 10 November 2019 | 14–1 | |
| 23 | (Scotland) Neve Guthrie | Dundee United | Hutchison Vale | 13 November 2019 | 6–3 | |
| 24 | (Scotland) Jade McDonald^{4} | St Johnstone | Hutchison Vale | 17 November 2019 | 10–0 | |

Notes

- 4 – Player scored four goals
- 6 – Player scored six goals
