= 2021–22 Scottish Women's Premier League =

Scottish Women's Premier League 1
- Season: 2021–22
- Champions: Rangers (1st title)
- Matches played: 135
- Goals scored: 481 (3.56 per match)
- Biggest home win: Glasgow City 10–1 Aberdeen; Glasgow City 9–0 Spartans
- Biggest away win: Hamilton Academical 0–7 Rangers; Partick Thistle 0–7 Celtic
- Highest scoring: Glasgow City 10–1 Aberdeen (11 goals)
- Longest unbeaten run: Rangers (27 games)

The 2021–22 Scottish Women's Premier League was the 21st season of the SWPL, the highest division of women's football in Scotland since 2002. The season was played with 10 teams; original participants Forfar Farmington resigned suddenly in August 2021 and Partick Thistle were elevated to SWPL 1 to maintain an even number of teams (leaving SWPL 2 one short).

The league season started on 5 September 2021 and ended on 15 May 2022. The competition was known as the Scottish Building Society Scottish Women's Premier League for sponsorship reasons, then as the Park's Motor Group Scottish Women's Premier League from November 2021. Glasgow City were the defending champions of 14 consecutive seasons.

In February 2022, Glasgow City lost 3–1 away to Rangers in a pivotal fixture; a 0–0 draw in the reverse fixture on 8 May gave Rangers the SWPL 1 championship, their first Scottish women's title. The Gers finished seven points ahead of Glasgow City and only dropped four points, via two draws against the deposed champions, defeating all other opponents three times for an unbeaten season. They also qualified for the UEFA Women's Champions League for the first time.

No clubs were relegated from SWPL 1 and two promoted from SWPL 2 due to divisional expansion to 12 teams for the 2022–23 season. The league's first promotion/relegation play-off had been planned until the expansion was confirmed in April 2022 following the SWPL clubs' majority vote to leave SWF for the SPFL in February.

== Teams ==
| Team | Location | Head coach | Home ground | Capacity | 2020–21 position |
|---|---|---|---|---|---|
| Aberdeen | Cove Bay | (Scotland) Emma Hunter (Scotland) Gavin Beith | Balmoral Stadium | 2,602 | 1st in SWPL 2 |
| Celtic | Airdrie | (Spain) Fran Alonso | Excelsior Stadium | 10,101 | 2nd |
| Glasgow City | Springburn | (Republic of Ireland) Eileen Gleeson | Petershill Park | 1,000 | 1st |
| Hamilton Academical | Hamilton | (Scotland) Gary Doctor | New Douglas Park | 6,018 | 2nd in SWPL 2 |
| Heart of Midlothian | Edinburgh | (Spain) Eva Olid | Oriam | 1,000 | 8th |
| Hibernian | Livingston | (Scotland) Dean Gibson | Almondvale Stadium | 3,000 | 4th |
| Motherwell | Motherwell | (Scotland) Stewart Hall (Scotland) Willie Kinniburgh (interim) | Alliance Park | 500 | 6th |
| Partick Thistle | Springburn | (Scotland) Brian Graham | Petershill Park | 1,000 | 3rd in SWPL 2 |
| Rangers | Milngavie | (Scotland) Malky Thomson | Rangers Training Centre | 500 | 3rd |
| Spartans | Edinburgh | (Scotland) Debbi McCulloch | Ainslie Park | 3,000 | 5th |

Locations of teams in the SWPL

== League table ==
| Pos | Team | Pld | W | D | L | GF | GA | GD | Pts | Qualification or relegation |
|---|---|---|---|---|---|---|---|---|---|---|
| 1 | Rangers (C, Q) | 27 | 25 | 2 | 0 | 97 | 11 | +86 | 77 | Qualification for the Champions League first round |
| 2 | Glasgow City (Q) | 27 | 22 | 4 | 1 | 89 | 13 | +76 | 70 | Qualification for the Champions League first round |
| 3 | Celtic | 27 | 19 | 3 | 5 | 85 | 22 | +63 | 60 | |
| 4 | Hibernian | 27 | 13 | 4 | 10 | 46 | 32 | +14 | 43 | |
| 5 | Aberdeen | 27 | 9 | 2 | 16 | 39 | 69 | −30 | 29 | |
| 6 | Spartans | 27 | 6 | 10 | 11 | 28 | 54 | −26 | 28 | |
| 7 | Motherwell | 27 | 8 | 3 | 16 | 31 | 75 | −44 | 27 | |
| 8 | Heart of Midlothian | 27 | 6 | 2 | 19 | 20 | 66 | −46 | 20 | |
| 9 | Partick Thistle | 27 | 4 | 6 | 17 | 29 | 70 | −41 | 18 | |
| 10 | Hamilton Academical | 27 | 3 | 4 | 20 | 17 | 69 | −52 | 13 | |

Rules for classification: 1) Points; 2) Goal difference; 3) Number of goals scored
(C) Champions; (Q) Qualified for the phase indicated

== Results ==
=== Matches 1 to 18 ===
| Home \ Away | ABE | CEL | GLA | HAW | HOM | HIB | MOT | PTW | RAN | SPA |
|---|---|---|---|---|---|---|---|---|---|---|
| Aberdeen | | 2–4 | 0–5 | 1–0 | 2–3 | 1–0 | 5–1 | 4–2 | 0–2 | 2–3 |
| Celtic | 3–1 | | 2–2 | 3–0 | 2–0 | 2–1 | 7–0 | 6–0 | 0–1 | 2–2 |
| Glasgow City | 10–1 | 2–0 | | 1–0 | 2–0 | 2–1 | 6–0 | 3–1 | 1–1 | 9–0 |
| Hamilton Academical | 1–2 | 0–6 | 1–3 | | 0–1 | 0–1 | 1–2 | 0–1 | 0–7 | 2–2 |
| Heart of Midlothian | 0–4 | 0–3 | 0–2 | 1–2 | | 1–3 | 1–0 | 2–4 | 0–3 | 1–1 |
| Hibernian | 1–0 | 1–1 | 0–3 | 2–2 | 3–0 | | 1–0 | 1–0 | 0–1 | 3–0 |
| Motherwell | 4–3 | 0–4 | 1–5 | 3–0 | 2–0 | 0–4 | | 2–2 | 0–1 | 3–0 |
| Partick Thistle | 0–2 | 0–7 | 0–2 | 2–2 | 2–3 | 3–2 | 3–2 | | 0–1 | 2–2 |
| Rangers | 8–0 | 3–0 | 3–1 | 4–0 | 6–0 | 2–1 | 5–0 | 7–1 | | 6–1 |
| Spartans | 0–0 | 0–2 | 0–4 | 1–0 | 3–1 | 0–0 | 0–0 | 0–0 | 2–5 | |

Legend: Blue = home team win; Yellow = draw; Red = away team win.

=== Matches 19 to 27 ===
| Home \ Away | ABE | CEL | GLA | HAW | HOM | HIB | MOT | PTW | RAN | SPA |
|---|---|---|---|---|---|---|---|---|---|---|
| Aberdeen | | 0–3 | | 2–1 | 0–1 | | | | | 1–1 |
| Celtic | | | | | 5–0 | 4–0 | 6–1 | | 1–3 | |
| Glasgow City | 4–1 | 2–1 | | 6–0 | | | 6–0 | 2–0 | | |
| Hamilton Academical | | 0–6 | | | | 0–4 | | | 0–4 | 1–2 |
| Heart of Midlothian | | | 0–2 | 1–1 | | | | 3–0 | 0–5 | |
| Hibernian | 4–1 | | 0–0 | | 4–1 | | 7–1 | | | |
| Motherwell | 3–2 | | | 0–1 | 1–0 | | | 3–3 | 1–2 | |
| Partick Thistle | 1–2 | 0–2 | | 1–2 | | 0–2 | | | | 0–0 |
| Rangers | 4–0 | | 0–0 | | | 5–0 | | 6–1 | | 2–1 |
| Spartans | | 1–3 | 0–4 | | 4–0 | 2–0 | 0–1 | | | |

Legend: Blue = home team win; Yellow = draw; Red = away team win.
