= 2025–26 Scottish Women's Premier League =

Scottish women's football league season

Scottish Women's Premier League
- Season: 2025–26
- Dates: 17 August 2025 – 24 May 2026
- Relegated: Hamilton Academical
- Champions League: Heart of Midlothian; Rangers
- Matches: 135
- Goals: 487 (3.61 per match)
- Top goalscorer: Katie Wilkinson (30 goals)
- Best goalkeeper: Lee Gibson; Jenna Fife (13 clean sheets)
- Biggest home win: Rangers 11–0 Hamilton Academical; 28 October 2026
- Biggest away win: Hamilton Academical 0–11 Rangers; 8 February 2026
- Highest scoring: Rangers 11–0 Hamilton Academical; 28 October 2026; Hamilton Academical 0–11 Rangers; 8 February 2026
- All statistics correct as of 29 April 2026.

The 2025–26 Scottish Women's Premier League, known as the ScottishPower Women's Premier League for sponsorship reasons, was the 25th season of the Scottish Women's Premier League (SWPL), the top division of women's football in Scotland, and the fourth season organised by the Scottish Professional Football League (SPFL). The season began on 17 August 2025 and concluded on 24 May 2026. Hibernian were the reigning champions, having won their fourth league title in the previous season, their first title since 2006–07. Hamilton Academical were the newly-promoted team taking part.

Glasgow City were the early pacesetters and led the table by five points at the end of February 2026 when the league split into two groups, chased by Rangers, Celtic and Hearts; however, before another league fixture was played they had a serious setback when top scorer Nicole Kozlova was seriously injured on international duty. On 22 March, City lost to Rangers (though had sufficient strength to defeat the same opposition to win the SWPL Cup a week later) and on 5 April they lost to Hearts (having never previously done so), and were leapfrogged into top spot; meanwhile Rangers were still in contention but Celtic's challenge had already faded. Hearts, whose head coach Eva Olid had announced that she would be leaving the Edinburgh club at the end of the season, beat Rangers in March and again in April to close in on a maiden championship, while their city rivals and deposed champions Hibernian would still have an input in proceedings as their last-minute win over Glasgow City on 10 May ended the latter's hopes. In the penultimate round of fixtures, Hearts were unable to clinch the title in a goalless draw with City while Rangers narrowed the gap to two points by beating Celtic to take the battle to the final matchday for the fourth successive season.

Despite losing 2–0 to Hibs on the last day, Hearts finished as champions after Rangers conceded early goals against Glasgow City and eventually collapsed 6–0. As well as their own first-ever Scottish title in only their sixth year in the top division (under Olid for most of that time), Hearts became the sixth different winner of the SWPL in as many seasons and the fifth unique club to do so in as many seasons, both uncommon sequences in the sport. For Rangers it was the fourth year in a row in which they had narrowly missed out in the tight title races, and unlike in the previous seasons where winning the Women's Scottish Cup provided some consolation, this time their disappointment was compounded by a defeat to Celtic in the final a week after the league concluded.

In the relegation group, Hamilton Academical were outclassed and their fate had long been sealed, ending on a total of two points with over 100 goals conceded. Aberdeen finished some way behind Motherwell and Montrose and faced a relegation play-off with second-tier Queen's Park (who finished fourth in their division but eliminated Boroughmuir Thistle and Kilmarnock to reach the final); Aberdeen retained their divisional status with a 5-0 victory in Airdrie. The only promoted side would therefore be SWPL2 winners Spartans, bouncing back having been one of three clubs relegated a year earlier when the league was reduced from 12 to 10 teams.

== Teams ==
Location of teams in the 2025–26 Scottish Women's Premier League (SWPL)

The number of teams in the league was decreased to 10, down from 12 in the previous season.

Team	Location	Manager	Home ground	Capacity
Aberdeen	Aberdeen (Cove Bay)	(Scotland) Scott Booth	Balmoral Stadium	2,602
Celtic	Hamilton (Whitehill)	(Scotland) Grant Scott	New Douglas Park	6,018
Glasgow City	Glasgow (Springburn)	(Scotland) Leanne Ross	Petershill Park	1,000
Hamilton Academical	Hamilton (Whitehill)	(Scotland) Robert Watson	New Douglas Park	6,018
Heart of Midlothian	Edinburgh (Riccarton)	(Spain) Eva Olid	Oriam	1,000
Hibernian	Edinburgh (Meadowbank)	(Scotland) Joelle Murray	Meadowbank Stadium	1,320
Montrose	Montrose	(Scotland) Craig Feroz	Links Park	4,936
Motherwell	East Kilbride (St Leonards)	(Scotland) Paul Brownlie	K-Park Training Academy	500
Partick Thistle	Glasgow (Springburn)	(Scotland) Gary Holt	Petershill Park	1,000
Rangers	Glasgow (Ibrox)	(Scotland) Leanne Crichton	Ibrox Stadium	51,700

== Regular season ==
Pos	Team	Pld	W	D	L	GF	GA	GD	Pts	Qualification or relegation
1	Glasgow City	18	14	4	0	49	6	+43	46	Qualification for the Top six
2	Rangers	18	13	2	3	62	16	+46	41	Qualification for the Top six
3	Celtic	18	13	2	3	53	17	+36	41	Qualification for the Top six
4	Heart of Midlothian	18	13	1	4	65	21	+44	40	Qualification for the Top six
5	Hibernian	18	10	4	4	47	15	+32	34	Qualification for the Top six
6	Partick Thistle	18	5	2	11	13	47	−34	17	Qualification for the Top six
7	Montrose	18	4	3	11	17	52	−35	15	Qualification for the Bottom four
8	Motherwell	18	3	2	13	15	45	−30	11	Qualification for the Bottom four
9	Aberdeen	18	3	2	13	17	48	−31	11	Qualification for the Bottom four
10	Hamilton Academical	18	0	2	16	8	79	−71	2	Qualification for the Bottom four

Source: BBC Sport / SWPL (22 February 2026)
Rules for classification: 1) Points; 2) Goal difference; 3) Number of goals scored

== Top six ==
Pos	Team	Pld	W	D	L	GF	GA	GD	Pts	Qualification or relegation
1	Heart of Midlothian (C)	28	20	2	6	85	31	+54	62	Qualification for the Champions League second round
2	Rangers	28	19	3	6	80	29	+51	60	Qualification for the Champions League second round
3	Glasgow City	28	17	7	4	65	14	+51	58	
4	Hibernian	28	16	7	5	62	23	+39	55	
5	Celtic	28	14	6	8	62	37	+25	48	
6	Partick Thistle	28	5	4	19	18	71	−53	19	

Source: BBC Sport / SWPL (24 May 2026)
Rules for classification: 1) Points; 2) Head-to-head record 3) Head-to-head goal difference
(C) Champions

== Bottom four ==
Pos	Team	Pld	W	D	L	GF	GA	GD	Pts	
1	Motherwell	24	8	3	13	35	52	−17	27	
2	Montrose	24	8	3	13	33	60	−27	27	
3	Aberdeen (O)	24	5	3	16	30	59	−29	18	Qualification for the promotion/relegation playoffs
4	Hamilton Academical (R)	24	0	2	22	10	104	−94	2	Relegation to the SWPL 2

Source: BBC Sport / SWPL (24 May 2026)
Rules for classification: 1) Points; 2) Head-to-head record 3) Head-to-head goal difference
(O) Play-off winners; (R) Relegated

== Results ==
=== Regular season ===
Home \ Away	ABE	CEL	GLA	HAM	HEA	HIB	MON	MOT	PAR	RAN
Aberdeen	—	2–4	0–1	5–0	1–5	0–3	1–2	2–1	1–1	0–3
Celtic	4–0	—	1–2	5–0	5–3	1–1	1–0	7–1	2–0	0–2
Glasgow City	5–0	1–1	—	7–0	5–1	0–0	5–0	3–0	2–0	1–1
Hamilton Academical	2–2	0–3	0–1	—	0–2	0–5	1–1	0–2	1–2	0–11
Heart of Midlothian	6–0	1–2	0–1	8–1	—	2–0	7–0	3–0	4–0	3–2
Hibernian	5–1	1–2	1–1	5–0	1–3	—	5–0	2–0	3–0	3–2
Montrose	0–2	0–4	1–6	2–0	1–7	1–1	—	1–1	1–2	1–6
Motherwell	2–0	0–2	0–4	4–1	0–3	0–5	1–4	—	1–1	0–3
Partick Thistle	1–0	0–7	0–3	3–2	0–5	0–5	0–2	2–1	—	1–4
Rangers	3–0	3–2	0–1	11–0	2–2	2–1	2–0	2–1	3–0	—

Source: Scottish Women's Premier League (SWPL)
Legend: Blue = home team win; Yellow = draw; Red = away team win.
For upcoming matches, an "a" indicates there is an article about the rivalry between the two participants.

=== Championship round ===
Home \ Away	CEL	GLA	HEA	HIB	PAR	RAN
Celtic	—	1–1	1–2	1–1	1–1	0–3
Glasgow City	1–1	—	0–1	0–1	4–0	6–0
Heart of Midlothian	4–1	0–0	—	1–2	3–0	3–2
Hibernian	1–0	3–2	2–0	—	0–0	2–2
Partick Thistle	2–3	0–2	1–4	1–3	—	0–3
Rangers	4–0	1–0	1–2	1–0	1–0	—

Source: Scottish Women's Premier League (SWPL)
Legend: Blue = home team win; Yellow = draw; Red = away team win.
For upcoming matches, an "a" indicates there is an article about the rivalry between the two participants.

=== Relegation round ===
Home \ Away	ABE	HAM	MON	MOT
Aberdeen	—	4–0	0–1	3–4
Hamilton Academical	2–3	—	0–5	0–3
Montrose	2–1	6–0	—	1–2
Motherwell	2–2	4–0	5–1	—

Source: Scottish Women's Premier League (SWPL)
Legend: Blue = home team win; Yellow = draw; Red = away team win.
For upcoming matches, an "a" indicates there is an article about the rivalry between the two participants.

== Season statistics ==
As of 24 May 2026

=== Top scorers ===
Rank	Player	Club	Goals
1	(England) Katie Wilkinson	Rangers	30
2	(England) Georgia Timms	Heart of Midlothian	19
3	(England) Carly Johns	Heart of Midlothian	18
3	(Republic of Ireland) Saoirse Noonan	Celtic	18
5	(Scotland) Kathleen McGovern	Hibernian	14
5	(Scotland) Eilidh Adams	Hibernian	14
5	(Scotland) Laura Berry	Rangers	14
5	(Scotland) Kaela McDonald-Nguah	Montrose	14
9	(Scotland) Carla Boyce	Hamilton Academical	13
10	(Scotland) Lisa Forrest	Glasgow City	12

==== Hat-tricks ====
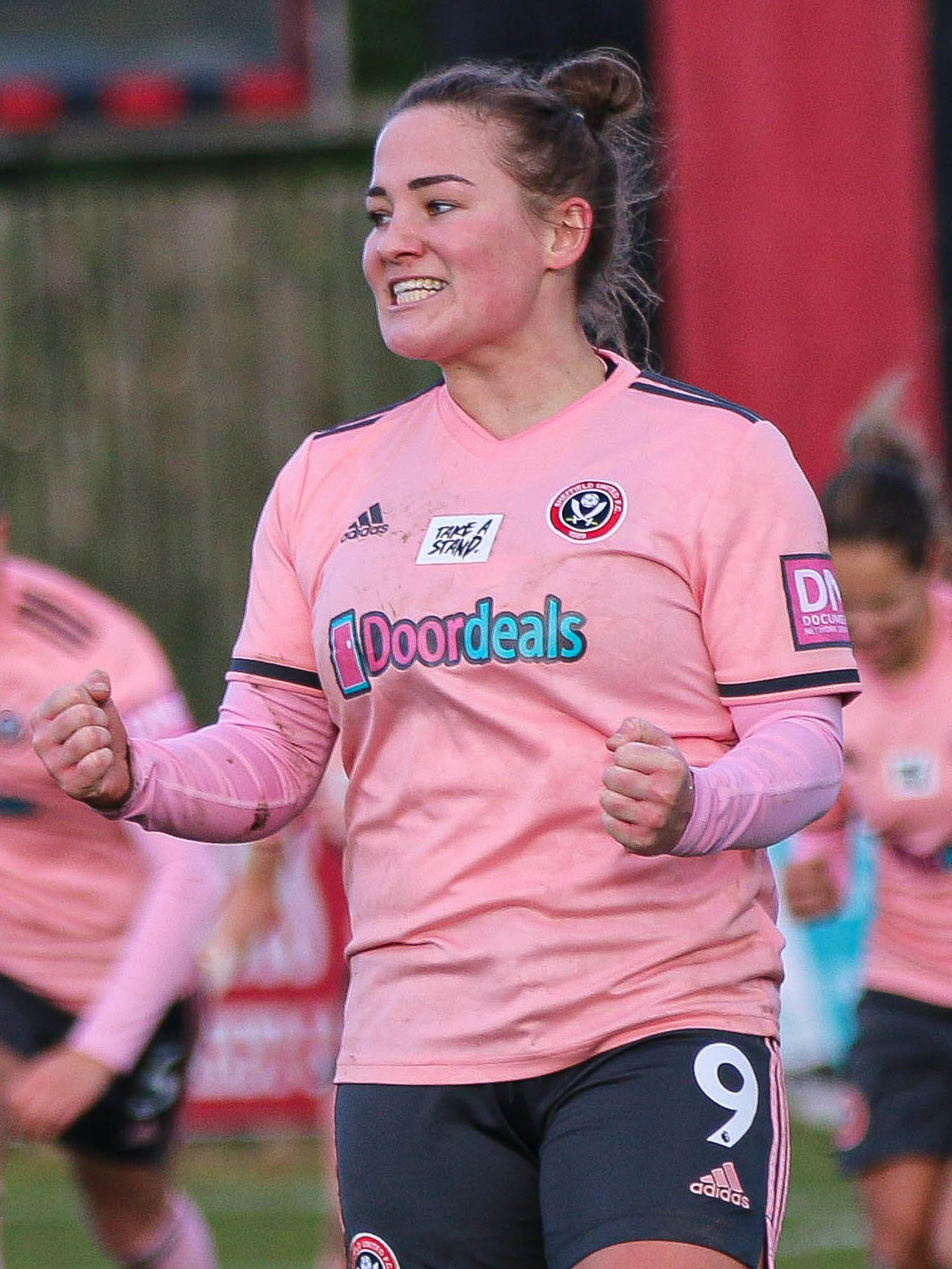
Rangers' Katie Wilkinson scored the most hat-tricks in the season, having scored three: one on the opening day against Montrose away, a five-goal haul against Hamilton Academical at home and one in the Old Firm, away against Celtic.

Player	For	Against	Result	Date
(England) Katie Wilkinson	Rangers	Montrose	6–1 (A)	17 August 2025
(Scotland) Kathleen McGovern	Hibernian	Montrose	5–0 (H)	14 September 2025
(Scotland) Siobhan Hunter	Hibernian	Hamilton Academical	5–0 (A)	28 September 2025
(Scotland) Bayley Hutchison	Heart of Midlothian	Montrose	7–0 (H)	12 October 2025
(England) Katie Wilkinson^{5}	Rangers	Hamilton Academical	11–0 (H)	19 October 2025
(England) Georgia Timms	Heart of Midlothian	Hamilton Academical	8–1 (H)	23 November 2025
(Scotland) Abi Harrison^{5}	Glasgow City	Hamilton Academical	7–0 (H)	14 December 2025
(Scotland) Laura Berry	Rangers	Hamilton Academical	11–0 (A)	8 February 2026
(Republic of Ireland) Saoirse Noonan	Celtic	Heart of Midlothian	5–3 (H)	22 February 2026
(Scotland) Jade McLaren	Montrose	Hamilton Academical	6–0 (H)	15 March 2026
(Scotland) Carla Boyce	Motherwell	Aberdeen	4–3 (A)	15 March 2026
(England) Carly Johns	Heart of Midlothian	Partick Thistle	4–1 (A)	18 March 2026
(England) Katie Wilkinson	Rangers	Celtic	3–0 (H)	6 April 2026
(Scotland) Kaela McDonald-Nguah	Montrose	Hamilton Academical	5–0 (A)	17 May 2026
(Scotland) Lisa Forrest	Glasgow City	Rangers	6–0 (H)	24 May 2026

Notes

- ^{5} Scored five goals

=== Clean sheets ===
Rank	Player	Club	Goals
1	(Scotland) Lee Gibson	Glasgow City	13
1	(Scotland) Jenna Fife	Rangers	13
3	(United States) Noa Schumacher	Hibernian	12
4	(Scotland) Rachael Johnstone	Heart of Midlothian	9
5	(Northern Ireland) Lauren Perry	Montrose	5
5	(Scotland) Lisa Rodgers	Celtic	5
7	(United States) Adelaide Gay	Celtic	3
7	(Scotland) Erin Clachers	Glasgow City	3
7	(England) Katie Cox	Aberdeen	3
7	(Scotland) Rebecca Cameron	Motherwell	3

=== Discipline ===
==== Player ====
- Most yellow cards: 9
  - (Scotland) Cheryl McCulloch (Partick Thistle)
- Most red cards: 2
  - (Slovenia) Lana Golob (Glasgow City)

==== Club ====
- Most yellow cards: 45
  - Partick Thistle
- Most red cards: 2
  - Celtic
  - Glasgow City
  - Montrose
- Fewest yellow cards: 19
  - Glasgow City
- Fewest red cards: 0
  - Aberdeen
  - Heart of Midlothian
  - Motherwell
  - Partick Thistle
  - Rangers

== Awards ==
=== Monthly awards ===
Players in italics left during the season

Month	Player of the Month		Other nominated players					
Month	Player	Club	Player	Club	Player	Club	Player	Club
August	(Scotland) Morgan Cross	Celtic	(England) Katie Lockwood	Glasgow City	(Scotland) Kathleen McGovern	Hibernian	(England) Katie Wilkinson	Rangers
September	(Ukraine) Nicole Kozlova	Glasgow City	(Scotland) Tegan Bowie	Hibernian	(England) Carly Johns	Heart of Midlothian	(Scotland) Mia McAulay	Rangers
October	(Finland) Sofia Määttä	Glasgow City	(Scotland) Eilidh Adams	Hibernian	(England) Carly Johns	Heart of Midlothian	(England) Katie Wilkinson	Rangers
November	(England) Georgia Timms	Heart of Midlothian	(Scotland) Maria McAneny	Hibernian	Celtic	(Scotland) Ellis Notley	(Netherlands) Kimberley Smit	Glasgow City
December	(Scotland) Kaela McDonald-Nguah	Montrose	(Scotland) Laura Berry	Rangers	(Slovenia) Lana Golob	Glasgow City	(Republic of Ireland) Saoirse Noonan	Celtic
January	(Scotland) Eilidh Austin	Rangers	(Ukraine) Nicole Kozlova	Glasgow City	(England) Georgia Timms	Heart of Midlothian	(Republic of Ireland) Claire Walsh	Celtic
February	(Ukraine) Nicole Kozlova	Glasgow City	(Scotland) Laura Berry	Rangers	(Scotland) Kathleen McGovern	Hibernian	(Scotland) Isla Taylor	Partick Thistle
March	(Scotland) Rosie Livingstone	Hibernian	(Scotland) Carla Boyce	Motherwell	(Scotland) Kelly Clark	Celtic	(Scotland) Hannah Stewart	Aberdeen
April	(Scotland) Eilidh Adams	Hibernian	(England) Carly Johns	Heart of Midlothian	(England) Katie Wilkinson	Rangers	(Netherlands) Danique Ypema	Heart of Midlothian
May	(Scotland) Eilidh Adams	Hibernian	(Scotland) Laura Berry	Rangers	(Scotland) Lisa Evans	Glasgow City	(Scotland) Lisa Forrest	Glasgow City
