= Rikki Fleming =

Scottish footballer (1946–2025)

Personal information
- Date of birth: 29 December 1946
- Place of birth: Paisley, Scotland
- Date of death: August 2025 (aged 78)
- Position: Central defender

Youth career
- Benburb
- 1966–1968: Rangers

Senior career*
Years	Team	Apps	(Gls)
1968–1978	Ayr United	290	(11)
1978–1979	Hibernian	12	(0)
1979–1980	Berwick Rangers	12	(0)
Total		314	(11)

International career
1974	Scottish League XI	1	(0)
- * Club domestic league appearances and goals

Rikki Fleming (29 December 1946 – August 2025) was a Scottish footballer, who played as a central defender for Ayr United, Hibernian and Berwick Rangers in the Scottish Football League.

Fleming died in August 2025, at the age of 78.
