= Willie Allan =

Scottish footballer (1942–2026)

Personal information
- Date of birth: 11 December 1942
- Date of death: 10 January 2026 (aged 83)
- Place of death: Falkirk, Scotland
- Position: Inside forward

Youth career
- Bo'ness United

Senior career*
Years	Team	Apps	(Gls)
1961–1963	Aberdeen	35	(1)
1963–1964	St Mirren	26	(4)
1964–1965	Falkirk	24	(3)
1965–1966	Durban City	42	(15)
1967–1970	Morton	67	(19)
1970	Cowdenbeath	6	(0)
1970–1972	Alloa Athletic	43	(3)
1972–1974	Bo'ness United		

International career
1962	Scotland U23	1	(0)
1962	Scottish League XI	1	(1)
- * Club domestic league appearances and goals

Willie Allan (11 December 1942 – 10 January 2026) was a Scottish professional footballer who played as an inside forward. He died on 10 January 2026, at the age of 83.
