= Jimmy Miller (footballer, born 1953) =

Scottish footballer (1953–2025)

Personal information
- Full name: James Carson Miller
- Date of birth: 4 January 1953
- Place of birth: Greenock, Scotland
- Date of death: December 2025 (aged 72)
- Height: 5 ft 6 in (1.68 m)
- Position: Midfielder

Youth career
- Port Glasgow
- Leicester City
- 1971–1973: Aberdeen

Senior career*
Years	Team	Apps	(Gls)
1973–1974	Aberdeen	4	(1)
1974–1977	Queen of the South	86	(2)
1977–1978	Motherwell	37	(1)
1978–1980	Morton	68	(0)
1980–1981	Clyde	31	(1)
1981–1983	Queen of the South	28	(0)
1983–1984	Albion Rovers	2	(0)
Total		256	(5)

International career
1969	Scottish Amateur Youth	2	(0)
- * Club domestic league appearances and goals

James Carson Miller (4 January 1953 – December 2025) was a Scottish professional footballer who played as a midfielder.

== Career ==
Born in Greenock, Miller began his career with Port Glasgow, where he won 2 Scottish Amateur Youth caps in 1969. He then played youth football for English club Leicester City before signing with Aberdeen in November 1971, for whom he made five appearances in all senior competitions. After being released by Aberdeen in April 1974, he moved to Queen of the South, where he made 86 league appearances in his first spell. He transferred to Motherwell, making 37 league appearances, before moving to Morton, making 68 league appearances. He won the First Division title with Morton.

He had a spell at Clyde, making 31 league appearances, before returning to Queen of the South, where he made a further 28 league appearances. In his two spells with Queens, he scored four goals in 151 games in all competitions. He finished his career with Albion Rovers, making two league appearances before retiring due to injury.

== Playing style ==
Miller was described by former Morton teammate Andy Ritchie as a "hard-working and a box-to-box player".

== Death ==
At some time before 2025, Miller had a leg amputated. Miller died in December 2025, at the age of 72.
