= Annanhill, East Ayrshire =

Coordinates: 55.607°N 4.515°W

Annanhill
- Location within East Ayrshire
- Council area: East Ayrshire
- Lieutenancy area: Ayrshire and Arran
- Country: Scotland
- Sovereign state: United Kingdom
- Post town: KILMARNOCK
- Postcode district: KA
- Dialling code: 01563
- Police: Scotland
- Fire: Scottish
- Ambulance: Scottish
- UK Parliament: Kilmarnock and Loudoun
- Scottish Parliament: Kilmarnock and Irvine Valley
- Website: http://www.east-ayrshire.gov.uk

Annanhill is an area of the town of Kilmarnock, in East Ayrshire. It is the home of Annanhill Primary, Grange Academy and Park School.
