= Paul Brownlie =

Scottish footballer

Personal information
- Date of birth: 30 August 1977 (age 49)
- Place of birth: Falkirk, Scotland
- Position: Striker

Senior career*
Years	Team	Apps	(Gls)
1995–1998	Clyde	69	(13)
1998	Stranraer	2	(0)
1998–1999	Raith Rovers	8	(0)
1999–2003	Arbroath	101	(15)
2003–2005	East Stirlingshire	23	(1)
Total		203	(29)
- * Club domestic league appearances and goals

Paul Brownlie (born 30 August 1977) is a Scottish former professional footballer who played as a striker. Active between 1995 and 2008, Brownlie made over 200 appearances in the Scottish Football League system, scoring 29 goals.

== Career ==
Born in Falkirk, Brownlie played for Clyde, Stranraer, Raith Rovers, Arbroath and East Stirlingshire.

== Personal life ==
His father John was also a professional footballer.
