= Dundee United W.F.C. =

Women's association football club in Dundee, Scotland

Dundee United
- Full name: Dundee United Football Club Women
- Founded: 2015
- Ground: Foundation Park, Dundee
- Coordinates: 56.474254°N 2.967182°W
- Chairperson: Colin Stewart
- Head coach: Suzy Shepherd
- League: SWPL 2
- 2025-26: SWPL2, 5th of 10th
Home colours	Away colours

Dundee United Football Club Women is a Scottish women's football club based in Dundee. Founded in 2015, they play in Scottish Women's Premier League 2, the second tier of the national league system, after winning promotion from the second tier in 2021–22 and third tier in 2018. They had previously been promoted from the fourth tier in their 2016 debut season, & have recently been relegated from the top tier to the second.

== History ==
Scottish Premiership club Dundee United announced in April 2015 that they were going to launch a women's team to compete in the Scottish Women's Football League (SWFL) from the following year. Club co-owner and director Justine Mitchell was instrumental in the decision. There were over fifty applicants for the position of head coach, none of whom were women. Gavin Beith was appointed as the team's first head coach in June 2015, with player trials commencing later that month. Ahead of the 2016 season, Fiona Mearns was chosen as the team captain.

United played their first competitive match on 6 March 2016, a 5–0 win over Dunfermline Athletic Development in SWFL Division 2 East at Gussie Park in Dundee. The same teams met again in June to contest the SWFL Division 2 Cup final. United lifted their first trophy with a 9–0 win, having led 7–0 at half time. The league title was secured with a 6–0 win over Edinburgh Caledonia on 9 October 2016. The club ended their first season having won all 16 league matches with a goal difference of +134.

In October 2018, Dundee United secured the SWFL Division 1 North title with a 7–2 win over Cove Rangers. United finished top of the league by a four-point margin, winning promotion to the second tier of the national Scottish Women's Premier League (SWPL) for the 2019 season.

United came under the auspices of the senior men's club in May 2022, changing their name from Dundee United Women's Football Club to Dundee United Football Club Women.

== Colours and badge ==
Dundee United wear tangerine shirts and black shorts. Change colours are white and black. The badge features a lion.

== Stadium ==
The team play their home matches at Foundation Park (formerly Gussie Park), which is owned by Dundee United F.C. and situated opposite the club's main Tannadice Park stadium. They played at Gussie Park, then known as the GA Arena due to sponsorship, from when the team was founded in 2015. Between 2020 and 2022, the team mainly played at the Regional Performance Centre at Caird Park., and also used the Dundee International Sports Centre on occasion during this period. Following the completion of the first phase of redevelopment work on the Gussie Park facilities, it once again became the team's regular ground from 2022 onwards. In August 2023, a new 200-seat spectator stand was opened at the same time as the ground was formally renamed Foundation Park, in recognition of the contribution to its redevelopment by the Dundee United Supporters' Foundation.

The team has also occasionally played matches on Tannadice Park itself, with the first being he match against Cove Rangers that clinched the SWFL Division 1 North title on 21 October 2018. This match was watched by an attendance of over 400. In May 2022, a new club record crowd of 726 watched them lift the SWPL2 trophy after a 3–2 win against St Johnstone. The team's first top flight match at Tannadice was against Aberdeen in November 2022.

== Squad ==
As of 20th February 2026

Note: Flags indicate national team as defined under FIFA eligibility rules; some limited exceptions apply. Players may hold more than one non-FIFA nationality.

No.	Pos.	Nation	Player
1	GK	SCO	Annalisa McCann
2	DF	SCO	Katie Frew
5	DF	SCO	Nicola Jameison
6	FW	SCO	Danni Findlay
7	FW	SCO	Maisy Stewart
8	MF	SCO	Natasha Bruce
9	FW	SCO	Robyn Smith
10	DF	SCO	Ellie May Cowie
11	MF	SCO	Alix Moodie
12	MF	SCO	Rachel Todd

No.	Pos.	Nation	Player
13	FW	ITA	Alma Codegoni (on loan from Montrose)
14	MF	SCO	Rebecca Foote
15	MF	SCO	Lyla Marnie
16	FW	SCO	Alex Logan
17	DF	SCO	Megan Burns
18	DF	SCO	Libby Reith
19	DF	SCO	Evie Swann
20	FW	SCO	Callie Bowmann (on loan from Heart of Midlothian)
21	GK	SCO	Sophia Riddell
22	FW	SCO	Maya Knight (currently on loan to East Fife W.F.C)
24	FW	SCO	Nyla Murphy
25	FW	SCO	Steffi Simson
26	MF	SCO	Milly MacKinlay
27	GK	SCO	Aoife Bidgood (currently on loan to Forfar Farmington W.F.C)
30	DF	SCO	Niamh Noble (on loan from Aberdeen)

== Managers ==
- Gavin Beith (2015–2021)
- Graeme Hart (2021–2024)
- Suzy Shepherd (2024–present)

== Coaching staff ==
- Head coach: Suzy Shepherd
- Assistant coaches: Duncan Donald and Drew Myles

== Honours ==
- Scottish Women's Premier League 2: 2021–22
- SWFL First Division (North): 2018
- SWFL Division 2 East: 2017
- SWFL Division 2 Cup: 2016
