= Gavin Beith =

Scottish footballer and coach

Personal information
- Date of birth: 7 October 1981 (age 45)
- Place of birth: Dundee, Scotland
- Position: Midfielder

Team information
- Current team: Manchester United Women (assistant)

Youth career
- Dundee

Senior career*
Years	Team	Apps	(Gls)
1999–2003	Dundee	4	(0)
2001	→ East Fife (loan)	15	(1)
2003	→ Peterhead (loan)	11	(2)
2003–2004	Brechin City	3	(1)
2004–2005	Arbroath	6	(0)
2005–2006	East Fife	35	(2)
2006–2008	Forfar Athletic	16	(0)
2008–2011	Carnoustie Panmure		
Total		90	(6)

Managerial career
- 2015–2021: Dundee United Women
- 2021–2023: Aberdeen Women (joint with Emma Hunter)
- 2023–2026: Hearts Women (assistant)
- 2026–: Manchester United Women (assistant)
- * Club domestic league appearances and goals

Gavin Beith (born 7 October 1981) is a Scottish football coach and former player, who played as a midfielder. He is currently assistant coach of Women's Super League team Manchester United Women, having previously been head coach of Aberdeen Women and Dundee United Women.

As a player, he began his career with Dundee, from where he was loaned to East Fife and Peterhead. He later played for Brechin City, Arbroath, East Fife again, Forfar Athletic, and Carnoustie Panmure.

== Early life ==
Beith was born in Dundee on 7 October 1981. He grew up supporting Rangers F.C. He left school at the age of 16 and signed for Dundee F.C. as a professional.

== Playing career ==
During his youth career at Dundee, Beith played for the club in the Scottish Youth Cup final. He made a few first team appearances and spent time on loan to East Fife and Peterhead. In November 2003, Beith was one of the players whose contracts were cancelled when Dundee entered administration. He went on to have spells as a part-time footballer with Brechin City, Arbroath, East Fife (second spell), Forfar Athletic, and junior club Carnoustie Panmure before retiring from playing in 2011.

== Coaching career ==
Beith entered football coaching, obtaining UEFA B Licence and Scottish Football Association (SFA) Advanced Youth Licence qualifications. He began his coaching career at Arbroath, where he was appointed youth coach in 2009, before working as a Player and Coach Development Officer at the SFA East Region office in Dundee.

In June 2015, Beith was appointed as the first head coach of Dundee United's newly formed women's team. During six years at the club, he won the Scottish Women's Football League (SWFL) Division 2 East and the SWFL Second Division Cup in his first season, then promotion from SWFL Division 1 North in 2018. He stepped down in July 2021, having narrowly missed out on promotion to the top flight of the Scottish Women's Premier League (SWPL) in the 2020–21 season.

In September 2021, Beith joined Aberdeen Women, newly promoted to the top division of the SWPL, as joint co-manager alongside Emma Hunter. He has also assisted Pauline MacDonald with coaching the Scotland women's under-17 team.

In January 2023, Beith was appointed assistant coach at Hearts Women, working alongside Sean Burt and first-team manager Eva Olid. He followed Olid in the same role at Manchester United Women.

== Career statistics ==
Appearances and goals by club, season and competition
Club	Season	League			Scottish Cup		League Cup		Europe (Note: Includes UEFA Cup and UEFA Intertoto Cup)		Other (Note: Includes Scottish Challenge Cup)		Total	
Club	Season	Division	Apps	Goals	Apps	Goals	Apps	Goals	Apps	Goals	Apps	Goals	Apps	Goals
Dundee	1999–2000	Premier League	0	0	0	0	0	0	–		–		0	0
Dundee	2000–01	Premier League	0	0	0	0	0	0	–		–		0	0
East Fife (loan)	2000–01	Third Division	15	1	0	0	0	0	–		0	0	15	1
Dundee	2001–02	Premier League	3	0	2	0	0	0	0	0	–		5	0
Dundee	2002–03	Premier League	1	0	0	0	1	0	–		–		2	0
Dundee	2003–04	Premier League	0	0	0	0	0	0	0	0	–		0	0
Dundee	Total		4	0	2	0	1	0	0	0	0	0	7	0
Peterhead (loan)	2003–04	Third Division	11	2	0	0	2	0	–		0	0	13	2
Brechin City	2003–04	First Division	3	1	0	0	0	0	–		0	0	3	1
Arbroath	2004–05	Second Division	6	0	0	0	0	0	–		1	0	7	0
East Fife	2004–05	Third Division	12	1	0	0	0	0	–		0	0	12	1
East Fife	2005–06	Third Division	23	1	0	0	1	0	–		0	0	24	1
East Fife	Total		35	2	0	0	1	0	0	0	0	0	36	2
Forfar Athletic	2006–07	Second Division	9	0	1	0	1	0	–		1	0	12	0
Forfar Athletic	2007–08	Third Division	7	0	0	0	1	0	–		1	0	9	0
Forfar Athletic	Total		16	0	1	0	2	0	0	0	2	0	21	0
Career total			90	6	3	0	6	0	0	0	3	0	102	6
