= Eva Olid =

Spanish football manager (born 1985)

- Olid in 2026

Personal information
- Full name: Eva Olid Nicolás
- Date of birth: 28 August 1985 (age 41)
- Place of birth: Sabadell, Spain

Team information
- Current team: Manchester United (head coach)

Managerial career
- Years: Team
- 2021–2026: Heart of Midlothian
- 2026–: Manchester United

Eva Olid Nicolás (born 28 August 1985) is a Spanish football manager who is currently the head coach of Manchester United in the Women's Super League.

Olid holds a UEFA Pro License, the highest coaching certification available in Europe.

== Career ==
Olid's first coaching roles were in her native Spain. At 26 years old she worked with Sant Quirze in the women’s third division, taking them to their highest-ever league position.

Seeking a club with greater ambitions, Olid spent a few years with Sant Cugat FC’s boys’ academy before choosing to return to women's football at her home town of Sabadell.

At Sabadell FC, Olid coached different teams, as well as gaining experience of disability football. She became head of women's football at the club.

=== USA experience ===
After working with a visiting American team at a tournament, Olid was offered a contract by Houston Dynamo. This was her first full-time professional coaching role. She worked at the academy and at Houston affiliate Louisiana Krewe.

=== Return to Catalonia ===
Olid returned to Spain when Covid restrictions curtailed her opportunities in the US. She worked for the Catalan Football Federation.

=== Heart of Midlothian ===
In 2021, Olid was appointed manager of the women's team of Scottish side Heart of Midlothian. She signed a new two-year contract in August 2023, being described as having "revolutionised the club and achieved a record fourth-place finish". In 2024, she took Hearts to the final of the Scottish Women's Cup, which they lost 2–0 to Rangers.

On 9 April 2026, it was announced that Olid would end her tenure as manager of Hearts by mutual agreement at the end of the 2025–26 season. A month later, she led the club to achieve their first-ever title in the Scottish Women's Premier League.

=== Manchester United ===
On 5 August 2026, Olid was appointed as the new head coach of Manchester United in the Women's Super League on a contract until June 2028, with the option to extend by a further year.

== Coaching style ==
Olid has been described as "very intriguing, in that she has looked to combine different aspects of traditional tactics from Spain, the USA and Scotland (where she has coached during her career) to come up with her own identity".

== Personal life ==
Olid grew up in Ca n'Oriac, a neighbourhood of Sabadell in Catalonia, and started playing football when she was seven years old. After initially playing with boys, Olid joined a girls' team when she was ten; she played for Sabadell and La Planada.

Due to the cost of playing, Olid decided to focus on her education and trained to become a teacher in Physical Education and English language.

== Managerial statistics ==
As of match played 22 November 2026

Statistics include competitive matches only.

Managerial record by team and tenure
| Team | From | To | Record | | | | |
| Team | From | To | G | W | D | L | Win % |
|---|---|---|---|---|---|---|---|
| Heart of Midlothian | 11 July 2021 | 24 May 2026 | 167 | 82 | 20 | 65 | 49.10 |
| Manchester United | 5 August 2026 | present | 16 | 11 | 3 | 2 | 68.75 |
| Career total | | | 183 | 93 | 23 | 67 | 50.82 |

== Honours ==
Heart of Midlothian

- Scottish Women's Premier League: 2025–26
- Women's Scottish Cup: runner-up 2023–24

Individual

- Scottish Women's Premier League Manager of the Season: 2025–26
