= St Johnstone W.F.C. =

Jeanfield Swifts - St Johnstone WFC
- Full name: Jeanfield Swifts W - St Johnstone W Football Club
- Founded: 2009 (as Jeanfield Swifts G.W.FC); 2018 (As St Johnstone WFC); 2025 (St Johnstone WFC as in own club)
- Ground: Riverside Stadium (Jeanfield Swifts F.C.), Bute Drive, Perth
- Capacity: 1,000
- Manager: vacant
- Coach: vacant
- Website: https://jeanfieldswifts.co.uk

St Johnstone WFC was part of Jeanfield Swifts Ladies Football Club is a Scottish women's football club based in Perth.

== History ==
=== Jeanfield Swifts 2009 - 2018 ===
The club was developed as part of Jeanfield Swifts Community Football Club, a community-orientated umbrella organisation that also included the men's senior club, Jeanfield Swifts F.C., as well as amateur and youth teams. Jeanfield were promoted to SWPL2, the second tier of the Scottish Women's Premier League (SWPL) for the 2016 season. During a league match against Glasgow Girls in August of that year, the club's director of coaching Donna Shaw played alongside her 14-year-old daughter Rachel Wolecki.

=== St Johnstone WFC 2018 - 2025 ===
Following promotion to the SWPL2, the club embarked on a partnership with local senior men's club St Johnstone, allowing them to use the facilities at the latter's McDiarmid Park stadium. The two clubs announced in November 2017, under a further development of their partnership, that the Swifts first team would play under the St Johnstone name from the 2018 season onwards.

On 11 February 2018, the team played their first SWPL2 match under the St Johnstone name, losing 3–1 at home to newly promoted Central Girls.

In late 2021, St Johnstone FC appointed their first General Manager of Women’s Football, with a key remit of further developing the reach of St Johnstone WFC and returning to play at there home ground Riverside Stadium, whilst continuing to develop the existing close ties with Jeanfield Swifts well regarded Girls Youth Pathway.

=== Jeanfield Swifts 2025 - Present ===
At the end of the 2024 / 2025 season it was agreed that St Johnstone WFC and Jeanfield Swifts would part ways and St Johnstone retaining the position in SWPL 2 and Jeanfield Swifts would enter the league at tier 5 SWFL North.

== Current Players ==
=== Current squad ===
Ellie MacIver
