= Republic of Ireland women's national football team results (2010–2019) =

This article contains the results of the Republic of Ireland women's national football team between 2010 and 2019.

== Results ==
=== 2010 ===
25 February 2010 Friendly	Republic of Ireland	1–2	France	Dublin, Ireland
19:30 UTC+0	Roche 78'	Report	Bompastor 52' (pen.); Delie 84'	Stadium: Richmond Park; Attendance: 700; Referee: Paul Tuite (Ireland)

21 March 2010 2011 FIFA Women's World Cup qualification	Israel	0–3	Republic of Ireland	Ness Ziona, Israel
17:00 UTC+2		Report	O'Sullivan 32', 52'; O'Brien 81'	Stadium: Ness Ziona Stadium; Referee: Ann-Helen Østervold (Norway)

31 March 2010 2011 FIFA Women's World Cup qualification	Republic of Ireland	1–2	Switzerland	Dublin, Ireland
19:30 UTC+1	Grant 57'	Report	Maendly 21'; Beney 54'	Stadium: Richmond Park; Referee: Jana Adámková (Czech Republic)

21 August 2010 2011 FIFA Women's World Cup qualification	Republic of Ireland	1–1	Russia	Wexford, Ireland
15:00 UTC+1	Grant 59' (pen.)	Report	Kozhnikova 64'	Stadium: Ferrycarrig Park; Referee: Cristina Dorcioman (Romania)

25 August 2010 2011 FIFA Women's World Cup qualification	Republic of Ireland	3–0	Israel	Bray, Ireland
19:30 UTC+1	O'Sullivan 59', 64', 80'	Report		Stadium: Carlisle Grounds; Referee: Elia María Martínez Martínez (Spain)

=== 2011 ===
24 August 2011 Friendly	Republic of Ireland	0–1	Switzerland	Dublin, Ireland
15:00 UTC+1		Report	Mehmeti 50'	Stadium: Richmond Park; Referee: Rhona Daly (Ireland)

17 September 2011 UEFA Women's Euro 2013 qualifying	Wales	0–2	Republic of Ireland	Newport, Wales
18:00 UTC+1		Report	D. O'Sullivan 27', 70'	Stadium: Newport Stadium; Attendance: 440; Referee: Marina Mamaeva (Russia)

22 September 2011 UEFA Women's Euro 2013 qualifying	Republic of Ireland	1–3	France	Cork, Ireland
19:45 UTC+1	O'Gorman 90+2'	Report	Nécib 62'; Delie 69'; Le Sommer 74'	Stadium: Turners Cross; Attendance: 2,235; Referee: Simona Ghisletta (Switzerland)

22 October 2011 UEFA Women's Euro 2013 qualifying	Republic of Ireland	2–0	Israel	Dublin, Ireland
15:00 UTC+1	D. O'Sullivan 74'; Grant 87'	Report		Stadium: Tallaght Stadium; Attendance: 1,010; Referee: Petra Chudá (Slovakia)

=== 2012 ===
29 February 2012 2012 Algarve Cup	Republic of Ireland	0–1	Hungary	Silves, Portugal
15:00 UTC+0		Report	Sipos 2'	Stadium: Estádio Municipal; Referee: Carina Vitulano (Italy)

2 March 2012 2012 Algarve Cup	Wales	0–0	Republic of Ireland	Ferreiras, Portugal
18:00 UTC+0		Report		Stadium: Desportivo da Nora Park; Referee: Aissata Amegee (Togo)

5 March 2012 2012 Algarve Cup	Portugal	2–1	Republic of Ireland	Faro, Portugal
17:15 UTC+0	Borges 7', 74'	Report	Quinn 29'	Stadium: Estádio Algarve; Referee: Margaret Domka (United States)

7 March 2012 2012 Algarve Cup	Hungary	1–2	Republic of Ireland	Quarteira, Portugal
11:00 UTC+0	Tálosi 60'	Report	O'Gorman 18'; Russell 52'	Stadium: Estádio Municipal de Quarteira; Referee: Aissata Amegee (Togo)

5 April 2012 UEFA Women's Euro 2013 qualifying	Scotland	2–1	Republic of Ireland	Edinburgh, Scotland
19:00 UTC+1	Jones 86'; Murray 87'	Report	D. O'Sullivan 4'	Stadium: Tynecastle Stadium; Attendance: 1,703; Referee: Katalin Kulcsár (Hungary)

16 June 2012 UEFA Women's Euro 2013 qualifying	Republic of Ireland	0–1	Wales	Cork, Ireland
17:00 UTC+1		Report	Lander 71'	Stadium: Turners Cross; Attendance: 653; Referee: Sofia Karagiorgi (Cyprus)

21 June 2012 UEFA Women's Euro 2013 qualifying	Republic of Ireland	0–1	Scotland	Cork, Ireland
19:30 UTC+1		Report	Corsie 25'	Stadium: Turners Cross; Attendance: 827; Referee: Teodora Albon (Romania)

15 September 2012 UEFA Women's Euro 2013 qualifying	France	4–0	Republic of Ireland	Guingamp, France
20:50 UTC+2	Thomis 8'; Le Sommer 13', 43'; Morel 86'	Report		Stadium: Stade du Roudourou; Attendance: 10,284; Referee: Mihaela Gurdon Basimamović (Croatia)

19 September 2012 UEFA Women's Euro 2013 qualifying	Israel	0–2	Republic of Ireland	Ramat Gan, Israel
16:00 UTC+3		Report	O'Sullivan 65'; Russell 67'	Stadium: Ramat Gan Stadium; Attendance: 132; Referee: Paloma Quintero Siles (Spain)

28 November 2012 Friendly	United States	5–0	Republic of Ireland	Portland, Oregon, United States
19:00 UTC−8	Morgan 24', 34', 44'; Leroux 62', 81'	Report		Stadium: Jeld-Wen Field; Attendance: 10,092; Referee: Katja Koroleva (USA)

1 December 2012 Friendly	United States	2–0	Republic of Ireland	Glendale, Arizona, United States
19:30 UTC−7	Morgan 1'; Rapinoe 38'	Report		Stadium: University of Phoenix Stadium; Attendance: 11,570; Referee: Kristen Schiereck (USA)

=== 2013 ===
6 March 2013 2013 Cyprus Cup	Republic of Ireland	5–1	Northern Ireland	Paralimni, Cyprus
17:30 UTC+2	Caldwell 11'; Quinn 27'; Campbell 71'; Smyth 77'; Littlejohn 90'		McShane 60'	Stadium: Tasos Markou

8 March 2013 2013 Cyprus Cup	Republic of Ireland	1–0	South Africa	Paralimni, Cyprus
14:30 UTC+2	O'Gorman 52'			Stadium: Tasos Markou

11 March 2013 2013 Cyprus Cup	South Korea	0–0	Republic of Ireland	Paralimni, Cyprus
17:30 UTC+2				Stadium: Tasos Markou

13 March 2013 2013 Cyprus Cup	Republic of Ireland	0–1	Finland	Paralimni, Cyprus
			Talonen 20'	Stadium: Tasos Markou

22 September 2013 2015 FIFA Women's World Cup qualification	Republic of Ireland	2–0	Slovakia	Dublin, Ireland
13:00 UTC+1	Russell 56'; D. O'Sullivan 74'	Report		Stadium: Tallaght Stadium; Attendance: 497; Referee: Pernilla Larsson (Sweden)

26 September 2013 2015 FIFA Women's World Cup qualification	Croatia	1–1	Republic of Ireland	Sinj, Croatia
15:30 UTC+2	Kolar 11'	Report	Caldwell 90+4'	Stadium: Gradski stadion Attendance: 1,500; Referee: Knarik Grigoryan (Armenia)

30 October 2013 2015 FIFA Women's World Cup qualification	Slovenia	0–3	Republic of Ireland	Velenje, Slovenia
17:00 UTC+1		Report	F. O'Sullivan 12'; O'Gorman 42'; D. O'Sullivan 46'	Stadium: Ob Jezeru City Stadium; Attendance: 500; Referee: Lilach Asulin (Israel)

=== 2014 ===
5 March 2014 2014 Cyprus Cup	New Zealand	1–1	Republic of Ireland	Paralimni, Cyprus
14:30 UTC+2	Wilkinson 87'	Report	O'Gorman 64'	Stadium: Tasos Markos Stadium

7 March 2014 2014 Cyprus Cup	Republic of Ireland	1–1	South Korea	Paralimni, Cyprus
14:30 UTC+2	Quinn 24'	Report	Ji So-Yun 38'	Stadium: Tasos Markos Stadium; Referee: Lorraine Clark (Scotland)

10 March 2014 2014 Cyprus Cup	Switzerland	1–2	Republic of Ireland	Paralimni, Cyprus
14:30 UTC+2	Dickenmann 76' (pen.)	Report	O’Sullivan 48'; Roche 90'	Stadium: Tasos Markos Stadium

12 March 2014 2014 Cyprus Cup	Canada	2–1	Republic of Ireland	Nicosia, Cyprus
14:00 UTC+2	Matheson 55'; Schmidt 90'	Report	Littlejohn 13'	Stadium: GSP Stadium

5 April 2014 2015 FIFA Women's World Cup qualification	Republic of Ireland	2–3	Germany	Dublin, Ireland
15:00 UTC+1	Quinn 3'; Roche 89'	Report	Laudehr 65' (pen.); Lotzen 84'; Leupolz 90+1'	Stadium: Tallaght Stadium; Attendance: 1,623; Referee: Efthalia Mitsi (Greece)

7 May 2014 2015 FIFA Women's World Cup qualification	Republic of Ireland	1–3	Russia	Dublin, Ireland
19:30 UTC+1	F. O'Sullivan 35'	Report	Sochneva 7'; Pantyukhina 12', 43'	Stadium: Tallaght Stadium; Attendance: 1,503; Referee: Efthalia Mitsi (Greece)

10 May 2014 Unofficial friendly	Basque Country	2–0	Republic of Ireland	Azpeitia, Spain
15:00 UTC+2	Beristain 13' 39'			Stadium: Garmendipe

14 June 2014 2015 FIFA Women's World Cup qualification	Republic of Ireland	1–0	Croatia	Dublin, Ireland
18:00 UTC+1	D. O'Sullivan 90+3'	Report		Stadium: Tallaght Stadium; Attendance: 1,046; Referee: Karolina Radzik-Johan (Poland)

19 June 2014 2015 FIFA Women's World Cup qualification	Russia	0–0	Republic of Ireland	Krasnoarmeysk, Russia
14:00 UTC+4		Report		Stadium: Krasnoarmeysk Stadium; Attendance: 700; Referee: Teodora Albon (Romania)

20 August 2014 2015 FIFA Women's World Cup qualification	Republic of Ireland	2–0	Slovenia	Dublin, Ireland
19:30 UTC+1	Russell 2'; F. O'Sullivan 76'	Report		Stadium: Tallaght Stadium; Attendance: 1,242; Referee: Linn Andersson (Sweden)

13 September 2014 2015 FIFA Women's World Cup qualification	Slovakia	0–1	Republic of Ireland	Senec, Slovakia
15:30 UTC+2		Report	Roche 90+2'	Stadium: NTC Senec; Attendance: 212; Referee: Simona Ghisletta (Switzerland)

17 September 2014 2015 FIFA Women's World Cup qualification	Germany	2–0	Republic of Ireland	Heidenheim, Germany
18:00 UTC+2	Behringer 28'; Mittag 34'	Report		Stadium: Voith-Arena; Attendance: 7,028; Referee: Kateryna Monzul (Ukraine)

=== 2015 ===
4 March 2015 2015 Istria Cup	Republic of Ireland	1–1	Hungary	Poreč, Croatia
11:30 UTC+1	Littlejohn 72'	Report	Vágó 57' (pen.)	Stadium: Veli Jože; Referee: Ivana Martincic

6 March 2015 2015 Istria Cup	Republic of Ireland	0–2	Slovenia	Umag, Croatia
11:30 UTC+1		Report	Šušková 52'; Klechová 73'	Stadium: Umag

9 March 2015 2015 Istria Cup	Republic of Ireland	0–2	Austria	Rovinj, Croatia
14:00 UTC+1		Report	Prohaska 26'; Burger 57'	Stadium: Valbruna

11 March 2015 2015 Istria Cup	Costa Rica	1–2	Republic of Ireland	Rovinj, Croatia
11:00 UTC+1	Venegas 53'	Report	Roche 21'; Campbell 30'	Stadium: Valbruna

10 May 2015 Friendly	United States	3–0	Republic of Ireland	San Jose, California, United States
11:30 UTC−7	Wambach 42', 45'; Johnston 54'	Report		Stadium: Avaya Stadium; Attendance: 18,000; Referee: Ekaterina Koroleva (United States)

13 May 2015 Friendly	Haiti	0–1	Republic of Ireland	Lauderhill, Florida, United States
20:00 UTC−4		Report	Littlejohn 21' (pen.)	Stadium: Central Broward Regional Park

21 September 2015 UEFA Women's Euro 2017 qualifying	Republic of Ireland	0–2	Finland	Dublin, Ireland
19:30 UTC+1		Report	Koivisto 13'; Sällström 71'	Stadium: Tallaght Stadium; Attendance: 2,905; Referee: Jana Adámková (Czech Republic)

27 October 2015 UEFA Women's Euro 2017 qualifying	Portugal	1–2	Republic of Ireland	Moreira de Cónegos, Portugal
15:00 UTC+0	Carole Costa 16'	Report	Quinn 22'; O'Gorman 40'	Stadium: Parque de Jogos Comendador Joaquim de Almeida Freitas; Attendance: 3,210; Referee: Gyöngyi Gaál (Hungary)

26 November 2015 UEFA Women's Euro 2017 qualifying	Republic of Ireland	0–3	Spain	Dublin, Ireland
14:00 UTC+0		Report	Losada 30'; Hermoso 44' (pen.); Perry 90+3' (o.g.)	Stadium: Tallaght Stadium; Attendance: 2,763; Referee: Stéphanie Frappart (France)

=== 2016 ===
23 January 2016 Friendly	United States	5–0	Republic of Ireland	San Diego, California, United States
14:00 UTC−8	Lloyd 6', 21', 28'; Morgan 45'; Pugh 83'	(Report)		Stadium: Qualcomm Stadium; Attendance: 23,309; Referee: Karen Abt (United States)

25 January 2016 Friendly (Note: Behind closed doors under–23 international featuring players from same joint squad as 23 January 2016 game)	United States	3–0	Republic of Ireland	Carson, California, United States
11:00 UTC−8	Gibbons 19'; Payne 39'; Gibbons 42'	(Report)		Stadium: StubHub Center; Attendance: 0 Referee: Israel Fernandez (United States)

2 March 2016 2016 Cyprus Cup	Austria	2–0	Republic of Ireland	Deryneia, Cyprus
	Aschauer 20'; Burger 54'	(Report)		Stadium: Anagennisi Stadium

4 March 2016 2016 Cyprus Cup	Italy	1–1	Republic of Ireland	Larnaca, Cyprus
	Carissimi 86'	(Report)	McCabe 90+3'	Stadium: GSZ Stadium

7 March 2016 2016 Cyprus Cup	Hungary	1–0	Republic of Ireland	Paralimni, Cyprus
	Szabo 76'	(Report)		Stadium: Paralimni Stadium

9 March 2016 2016 Cyprus Cup	Finland	0–2	Republic of Ireland	Paralimni, Cyprus
		(Report)	Littlejohn 3' (pen.); Quinn 13'	Stadium: Paralimni Stadium

7 April 2016 UEFA Women's Euro 2017 qualifying	Montenegro	0–5	Republic of Ireland	Petrovac, Montenegro
14:00 UTC+2		Report	Quinn 3'; O'Gorman 24'; Littlejohn 26' (pen.); D. O'Sullivan 73'; Roche 84'	Stadium: Stadion pod Malim Brdom; Referee: Dimitrina Milkova (Bulgaria)

12 April 2016 UEFA Women's Euro 2017 qualifying	Spain	3–0	Republic of Ireland	Las Rozas de Madrid, Spain
18:00 UTC+2	Boquete 58', 65'; Hermoso 86'	Report		Stadium: La Ciudad del Fútbol; Attendance: 1,380; Referee: Linn Andersson (Sweden)

3 June 2016 UEFA Women's Euro 2017 qualifying	Finland	4–1	Republic of Ireland	Valkeakoski, Finland
18:05 UTC+3	Alanen 32'; Danielsson 39'; Kuikka 70'; Sällström 87'	Report	Roche 76'	Stadium: Tehtaan kenttä Attendance: 1,056; Referee: Cristina Dorcioman (Romania)

7 June 2016 UEFA Women's Euro 2017 qualifying	Republic of Ireland	9–0	Montenegro	Dublin, Ireland
19:00 UTC+1	Connolly 3'; O'Gorman 11', 53', 58'; Roche 45', 65', 69'; Quinn 62'; F. O'Sullivan 83'	Report		Stadium: Tallaght Stadium; Referee: Ivana Projkovska (Macedonia)

20 September 2016 UEFA Women's Euro 2017 qualifying	Republic of Ireland	0–1	Portugal	Dublin, Ireland
18:00 UTC+1		Report	Neto 78'	Stadium: Tallaght Stadium; Attendance: 863; Referee: Esther Azzopardi (Malta)

=== 2017 ===
1 March 2017 Cyprus Cup	Czech Republic	0–2	Republic of Ireland	Paralimni, Cyprus
12:30 UTC+2		Report	Roche 25'; O'Gorman 87'	Stadium: Paralimni Stadium

3 March 2017 Cyprus Cup	Hungary	0–0	Republic of Ireland	Paralimni, Cyprus
15:30 UTC+2		Report		Stadium: Paralimni Stadium

6 March 2017 Cyprus Cup	Wales	0–1	Republic of Ireland	Paralimni, Cyprus
12:30 UTC+2		Report	McCabe 20'	Stadium: Paralimni Stadium

8 March 2017 Cyprus Cup	North Korea	2–0	Republic of Ireland	Paralimni, Cyprus
12:30 UTC+2	Wi Jong-sim 73'; Kim Ryu-song 85'	Report		Stadium: Paralimni Stadium

10 April 2017 Friendly	Republic of Ireland	1–0	Slovakia	Tallaght, Ireland
14:00 UTC+1	Roche 46' (pen.)	Report		Stadium: Tallaght Stadium; Attendance: 1,037

8 June 2017 Friendly	Republic of Ireland	0–0	Iceland	Tallaght, Ireland
19:30 UTC+1		Report		Stadium: Tallaght Stadium; Attendance: 862; Referee: Paula Brady (Ireland)

7 July 2017 Friendly	Scotland	1–0	Republic of Ireland	Kirkcaldy, Scotland
19:30 UTC+1	Murray 85'	Report		Stadium: Stark's Park; Attendance: 1,960

19 September 2017 WCQ-G3	Northern Ireland	0–2	Republic of Ireland	Lurgan, Northern Ireland
19:30 UTC+1		Report	Rachel Furness 45+1' (o.g.); Megan Campbell 69'	Stadium: Mourneview Park; Attendance: 877; Referee: Vesna Budimir

24 October 2017 WCQ-G3	Slovakia	0–2	Republic of Ireland	Senec, Slovakia
17:30 UTC+2		Report	O'Sullivan 11'; Vojteková 33' (o.g.)	Stadium: NTC Senec; Attendance: 435; Referee: Triinu Laos (Estonia)

28 November 2017 WCQ-G3	Netherlands	0–0	Republic of Ireland	Nijmegen, Netherlands
20:00 UTC+1		Report		Stadium: Stadion de Goffert; Attendance: 11,400; Referee: Anastasia Pustovoitova (Russia)

=== 2018 ===
18 January 2018 Friendly	Portugal	1–0	Republic of Ireland	Ponta Delgada, Portugal
19:00 UTC+0	Dolores Silva 60' (pen.)	Report		Stadium: Estádio de São Miguel; Referee: Sandra Braz Bastos (Portugal)

22 January 2018 Friendly	Portugal	1–3	Republic of Ireland	Ponta Delgada, Portugal
17:00 UTC+0	Diana Silva 77'	Report	McCabe 33'; Kiernan 48'; Quinn 66'	Stadium: Estádio de São Miguel; Referee: Silvia Andreia Rosa Domingos (Portugal)

6 April 2018 WCQ-G3	Republic of Ireland	2–1	Slovakia	Tallaght, Ireland
17:00 UTC+1	Kiernan 69'; Barrett 87'	Report	Hourihan 73' (o.g.)	Stadium: Tallaght Stadium; Attendance: 3,521; Referee: Simona Ghisletta (Switzerland)

10 April 2018 WCQ-G3	Republic of Ireland	0–2	Netherlands	Tallaght, Ireland
19:00 UTC+1		Report	Beerensteyn 11'; Spitse 23' (pen.)	Stadium: Tallaght Stadium; Attendance: 4,047; Referee: Stéphanie Frappart (France)

8 June 2018 WCQ-G3	Republic of Ireland	0–2	Norway	Tallaght, Ireland
17:30 UTC+1		Report	Utland 21', 61'	Stadium: Tallaght Stadium; Attendance: 3,172; Referee: Kateryna Monzul (Ukraine)

12 June 2018 WCQ-G3	Norway	1–0	Republic of Ireland	Stavanger, Norway
18:00 UTC+2	Graham Hansen 25' (pen.)	Report		Stadium: Viking Stadion; Attendance: 3,609; Referee: Esther Staubli (Switzerland)

31 August 2018 WCQ-G3	Republic of Ireland	4–0	Northern Ireland	Tallaght, Ireland
17:30 UTC+1	Kiernan 4', 27'; McCabe 12', 58' (pen.)	Report		Stadium: Tallaght Stadium; Attendance: 1,603; Referee: Angelika Söder (Germany)

9 October 2018 Friendly	Poland	4–0	Republic of Ireland	Ostroda, Poland
17:00 UTC+2	Chudzik 55' (pen.); Grzywińska 69'; Kamczyk 72'; Pajor 78'	Report		Stadium: Stadion Miejski w Ostródzie; Referee: Karolina Tokarska (Poland)

=== 2019 ===
20 January 2019 Friendly	Belgium	1–0	Republic of Ireland	Murcia, Spain
14:00 UTC+1	Dhont 16'	Report		Stadium: Pinatar Arena; Referee: Zulema Gonzalez Gonzalez (Spain)

28 February 2019 Friendly	Wales	0–0	Republic of Ireland	Marbella, Spain
16:00 UTC+1		Report		Stadium: Marbella Football Centre

5 March 2019 Friendly	Wales	0–1	Republic of Ireland	Marbella, Spain
13:00 UTC+1		Report	Quinn 62'	Stadium: Estadio Municipal de Marbella

9 April 2019 Friendly	Italy	2–1	Republic of Ireland	Reggio Emilia, Italy
18:30 UTC+2	Bonansea 40'; Sabatino 53'	Report	McCabe 3'	Stadium: Mapei Stadium – Città del Tricolore; Attendance: 4.200; Referee: Sara Persson (Sweden)

3 August 2019 Friendly	United States	3–0	Republic of Ireland	Pasadena, United States
19:00 UTC−7	Heath 16'; Horan 31'; Lloyd 41'	Report		Stadium: Rose Bowl; Attendance: 37,040; Referee: Katja Koroleva (United States)

3 September 2019 EUROQ-GI	Republic of Ireland	2–0	Montenegro	Dublin, Ireland
19:30 UTC+1	Toland 7'; McCabe 69' (pen.)	Report		Stadium: Tallaght Stadium; Attendance: 3,423; Referee: Catarina Isabel Ferreira Campos (Portugal)

8 October 2019 EUROQ-GI	Republic of Ireland	3–2	Ukraine	Dublin, Ireland
19:30 UTC+1	McCabe 25'; Jarrett 29'; Pantsulaia 53' (o.g.)	Report	Shmatko 33'; Ovdiychuk 42'	Stadium: Tallaght Stadium; Attendance: 5.328; Referee: Claudine Brohet (Belgium)

12 November 2019 EUROQ-GI	Greece	1–1	Republic of Ireland	Athens, Greece
15:00 UTC+2	Spyridonidou 90+3'	Report	Barrett 13'	Stadium: Nea Smyrni Stadium; Attendance: 500; Referee: Henrikke Nervik (Norway)
