= 2015 FIFA Women's World Cup qualification – UEFA Group 1 =

Football tournament qualification stage

The 2015 FIFA Women's World Cup qualification UEFA Group 1 was a UEFA qualifying group for the 2015 FIFA Women's World Cup. The group comprised Croatia, Germany, Republic of Ireland, Russia, Slovakia and Slovenia.

The group winners qualified directly for the 2015 FIFA Women's World Cup. Among the seven group runners-up, the four best (determined by records against the first-, third-, fourth- and fifth-placed teams only for balance between different groups) advanced to the play-offs.

== Standings ==
Pos	Team	Pld	W	D	L	GF	GA	GD	Pts	Qualification	Germany	Russia	Ireland	Croatia	Slovenia	Slovakia
1	Germany	10	10	0	0	62	4	+58	30	Women's World Cup	—	9–0	2–0	4–0	4–0	9–1
2	Russia	10	7	1	2	19	18	+1	22		1–4	—	0–0	1–0	4–1	3–1
3	Republic of Ireland	10	5	2	3	13	9	+4	17		2–3	1–3	—	1–0	2–0	2–0
4	Croatia	10	2	2	6	7	20	−13	8		0–8	1–3	1–1	—	1–0	0–1
5	Slovenia	10	2	0	8	7	34	−27	6		0–13	1–2	0–3	0–3	—	2–1
6	Slovakia	10	1	1	8	6	29	−23	4		0–6	0–2	0–1	1–1	1–3	—

Source: UEFA
Rules for classification: Tiebreakers

== Results ==
All times are CEST (UTC+02:00) during summer and CET (UTC+01:00) during winter.

21 September 2013
15:00

Germany	9–0	Russia
Šašić 22' (pen.); Keßler 25', 85'; Marozsán 26', 37'; Alushi 73'; Leupolz 76'; Goeßling 80'; Schmidt 87'	Report

Stadion der Freundschaft, Cottbus
Attendance: 10,031
Referee: Jana Adámková (Czech Republic)
22 September 2013
14:00

Republic of Ireland	2–0	Slovakia
Russell 56'; D. O'Sullivan 74'	Report

Tallaght Stadium, Dublin
Attendance: 497
Referee: Pernilla Larsson (Sweden)

26 September 2013
15:30

Croatia	1–1	Republic of Ireland
Kolar 11'	Report	Caldwell 90+4'

Gradski stadion, Sinj
Attendance: 1,500
Referee: Knarik Grigoryan (Armenia)
26 September 2013
18:00

Slovakia	1–3	Slovenia
Škorvánková 77'	Report	own goal 30'; Nikl 45+1'; Zver 89'

NTC Senec, Senec
Attendance: 262
Referee: Stéphanie Frappart (France)

26 October 2013
14:00

Croatia	0–1	Slovakia
	Report	Bartovičová 33'

Sv. Josip Radnik, Sesvete
Attendance: 500
Referee: Sandra Bastos (Portugal)
26 October 2013
15:45

Slovenia	0–13	Germany
	Report	Šašić 4' (pen.), 32', 66'; Maier 10'; Mittag 16', 20', 65'; Krahn 19'; Laudehr 42'; Alushi 62'; Goeßling 85', 87'; Popp 90+3'

Bonifika Stadium, Koper
Attendance: 2,000
Referee: Amy Rayner (England)

30 October 2013
17:00

Slovenia	0–3	Republic of Ireland
	Report	F. O'Sullivan 12'; O'Gorman 42'; D. O'Sullivan 46'

Ob Jezeru City Stadium, Velenje
Attendance: 500
Referee: Lilach Asulin (Israel)
30 October 2013
18:00

Germany	4–0	Croatia
Šašić 52'; Hercigonja-Moulton 56' (o.g.), 62' (o.g.); Wensing 80'	Report

Stadion am Bornheimer Hang, Frankfurt
Attendance: 6,104
Referee: Lina Lehtovaara (Finland)
31 October 2013
17:00

Slovakia	0–2	Russia
	Report	Kolenová 72' (o.g.); Morozova 74'

NTC Senec, Senec
Attendance: 324
Referee: Katalin Kulcsár (Hungary)

23 November 2013
14:00

Slovakia	0–6	Germany
	Report	Keßler 8', 83'; Mittag 57', 65'; Popp 84'; Marozsán 87'

Štadión pod Dubňom, Žilina
Attendance: 1,128
Referee: Elia Martinez (Spain)

27 November 2013
14:00

Croatia	0–8	Germany
	Report	Marozsán 12', 22', 68', 80'; Šašić 13'; Mittag 53'; Popp 72'; Bartusiak 90+1'

Stadion Gradski vrt, Osijek
Attendance: 400
Referee: Yuliya Medvedeva-Keldyusheva (Kazakhstan)

5 April 2014
14:00

Russia	4–1	Slovenia
Orlova 31'; Korovkina 36'; Tsybutovich 53'; Pantyukhina 87'	Report	Jerina 12'

Rodina Stadium, Khimki
Attendance: 302
Referee: Olga Zadinová (Czech Republic)
5 April 2014
16:00

Republic of Ireland	2–3	Germany
Quinn 3'; Roche 89'	Report	Laudehr 65' (pen.); Lotzen 84'; Leupolz 90+1'

Tallaght Stadium, Dublin
Attendance: 1,623
Referee: Efthalia Mitsi (Greece)

9 April 2014
15:00

Russia	1–0	Croatia
Pantyukhina 9'	Report

Rodina Stadium, Khimki
Attendance: 200
Referee: Sofia Karagiorgi (Cyprus)
10 April 2014
18:00

Germany	4–0	Slovenia
Leupolz 18'; Mittag 21', 67'; Lotzen 63'	Report

Carl-Benz-Stadion, Mannheim
Attendance: 7,122
Referee: Sandra Bastos (Portugal)

7 May 2014
20:30

Republic of Ireland	1–3	Russia
F. O'Sullivan 35'	Report	Sochneva 7'; Pantyukhina 12', 43'

Tallaght Stadium, Dublin
Attendance: 1,503
Referee: Efthalia Mitsi (Greece)
8 May 2014
17:00

Germany	9–1	Slovakia
Alushi 2', 35', 70'; Mittag 24', 80'; Keßler 39'; Marozsán 40'; Leupolz 73'; Laudehr 76'	Report	Bíróová 85'

Stadion an der Bremer Brücke, Osnabrück
Attendance: 8,569
Referee: Séverine Zinck (France)
8 May 2014
17:00

Slovenia	0–3	Croatia
	Report	Hercigonja-Moulton 7'; Balog 10'; Landeka 17' (pen.)

Ptuj City Stadium, Ptuj
Attendance: 400
Referee: Eleni Lampadariou (Greece)

14 June 2014
17:30

Slovenia	1–2	Russia
Jerina 59'	Report	Tsybutovich 28'; Grad 41' (o.g.)

Domžale Sports Park, Domžale
Attendance: 200
Referee: Gyöngyi Gaál (Hungary)
14 June 2014
19:00

Republic of Ireland	1–0	Croatia
D. O'Sullivan 90+3'	Report

Tallaght Stadium, Dublin
Attendance: 1,046
Referee: Karolina Radzik-Johan (Poland)

19 June 2014
14:00

Russia	0–0	Republic of Ireland
	Report

Krasnoarmeysk Stadium, Krasnoarmeysk
Attendance: 700
Referee: Teodora Albon (Romania)
19 June 2014
18:00

Slovakia	1–1	Croatia
Šušková 29'	Report	Lojna 32'

NTC Senec, Senec
Attendance: 569
Referee: Graziella Pirriatore (Italy)

20 August 2014
20:30

Republic of Ireland	2–0	Slovenia
Russell 2'; F. O'Sullivan 76'	Report

Tallaght Stadium, Dublin
Attendance: 1,242
Referee: Linn Andersson (Sweden)
21 August 2014
14:00

Russia	3–1	Slovakia
Sidorovskaya 58'; Morozova 63'; Pantyukhina 80'	Report	Kolenová 25'

Krylia Sovetov, Moscow
Attendance: 250
Referee: Eleni Lampadariou (Greece)

13 September 2014
14:45

Russia	1–4	Germany
Tsybutovich 9' (pen.)	Report	Laudehr 6'; Šašić 19', 28', 72'

Luzhniki Olympic Complex, Moscow
Attendance: 2,000
Referee: Pernilla Larsson (Sweden)
13 September 2014
15:00

Croatia	1–0	Slovenia
Lojna 15'	Report

Stadion Lučko, Zagreb
Attendance: 100
Referee: Monica Larsen (Norway)
13 September 2014
15:30

Slovakia	0–1	Republic of Ireland
	Report	Roche 90+2'

NTC Senec, Senec
Attendance: 212
Referee: Simona Ghisletta (Switzerland)

17 September 2014
16:00

Slovenia	2–1	Slovakia
Nikl 47'; Zver 76'	Report	Ondrušová 74'

Dravograd Sports Centre, Dravograd
Attendance: 300
Referee: Dilan Gökçek (Turkey)
17 September 2014
17:00

Croatia	1–3	Russia
Lojna 26'	Report	Pantyukhina 11', 34'; Terekhova 77'

Stadion NŠC Stjepan Spajić, Zagreb
Attendance: 300
Referee: Monika Mularczyk (Poland)
17 September 2014
18:00

Germany	2–0	Republic of Ireland
Behringer 28'; Mittag 34'	Report

Voith-Arena, Heidenheim
Attendance: 7,028
Referee: Kateryna Monzul (Ukraine)

== Goalscorers ==
11 goals

- (Germany) Anja Mittag

9 goals

- (Germany) Célia Šašić

8 goals

- (Germany) Dzsenifer Marozsán

7 goals

- (Russia) Ekaterina Pantyukhina

5 goals

- (Germany) Fatmire Alushi
- (Germany) Nadine Keßler

4 goals

- (Germany) Simone Laudehr
- (Germany) Melanie Leupolz

3 goals

- (Croatia) Izabela Lojna
- (Germany) Lena Goeßling
- (Germany) Alexandra Popp
- (Republic of Ireland) Denise O'Sullivan
- (Republic of Ireland) Fiona O'Sullivan
- (Russia) Ksenia Tsybutovich

2 goals

- (Germany) Lena Lotzen
- (Republic of Ireland) Stephanie Roche
- (Republic of Ireland) Julie-Ann Russell
- (Russia) Elena Morozova
- (Slovenia) Kaja Jerina
- (Slovenia) Andreja Nikl
- (Slovenia) Mateja Zver

1 goal

- (Croatia) Leonarda Balog
- (Croatia) Helenna Hercigonja-Moulton
- (Croatia) Katarina Kolar
- (Croatia) Iva Landeka
- (Germany) Saskia Bartusiak
- (Germany) Melanie Behringer
- (Germany) Annike Krahn
- (Germany) Leonie Maier
- (Germany) Bianca Schmidt
- (Germany) Luisa Wensing
- (Republic of Ireland) Diane Caldwell
- (Republic of Ireland) Áine O'Gorman
- (Republic of Ireland) Louise Quinn
- (Russia) Nelli Korovkina
- (Russia) Valentina Orlova
- (Russia) Alla Sidorovskaya
- (Russia) Ekaterina Sochneva
- (Russia) Elena Terekhova
- (Slovenia) Anisa Rola
- (Slovakia) Diana Bartovičová
- (Slovakia) Alexandra Bíróová
- (Slovakia) Eva Kolenová
- (Slovakia) Lucia Ondrušová
- (Slovakia) Dominika Škorvánková
- (Slovakia) Lucia Šušková

2 own goals

- (Croatia) Helenna Hercigonja-Moulton (playing against Germany)

1 own goal

- (Slovakia) Eva Kolenová (playing against Russia)
- (Slovenia) Luzija Grad (playing against Russia)
