= Croatia women's national football team results =

This is a list of the games played by the Croatia women's national football team since Croatia gained independence from Yugoslavia in 1990.

== List of Croatia games ==
M	Date	Venue	Opponent	Score	Tournament
1	28 October 1993	Ižakovci, Slovenia	Slovenia	2–3	Friendly
2	10 November 1993	Winterthur, Switzerland	Switzerland	2–1	1995 UEFA Women's Championship qualification
3	10 March 1994		Slovenia	2–0	Friendly
4	5 April 1994	Zagreb, Croatia	Wales	3–0	1995 UEFA Women's Championship qualification
5	4 May 1994	Zagreb, Croatia	Switzerland	1–1	1995 UEFA Women's Championship qualification
6	22 May 1994	Flint, Wales	Wales	2–1	1995 UEFA Women's Championship qualification
7	2 June 1994	Zagreb, Croatia	Germany	0–7	1995 UEFA Women's Championship qualification
8	21 September 1994	Sindelfingen, Germany	Germany	0–8	1995 UEFA Women's Championship qualification
9	21 October 1995	Verona, Italy	Italy	0–7	1997 UEFA Women's Championship qualification
10	4 November 1995	Samobor, Croatia	Portugal	0–2	1997 UEFA Women's Championship qualification
11	19 November 1995	London, England	England	0–5	1997 UEFA Women's Championship qualification
12	18 April 1996	Osijek, Croatia	England	0–2	1997 UEFA Women's Championship qualification
13	11 May 1996	Poreč, Croatia	Italy	0–0	1997 UEFA Women's Championship qualification
14	25 May 1996	Coimbra, Portugal	Portugal	0–1	1997 UEFA Women's Championship qualification
15	7 September 1996	Marly, Switzerland	Switzerland	2–3	1997 UEFA Women's Championship qualification
16	28 September 1996	Kutina, Croatia	Switzerland	0–3	1997 UEFA Women's Championship qualification
17	23 October 1999	Poreč, Croatia	Scotland	4–3	2001 UEFA Women's Championship qualification
18	30 October 1999	Dublin, Ireland	Republic of Ireland	0–2	2001 UEFA Women's Championship qualification
19	6 May 2000	Velika Gorica, Croatia	Republic of Ireland	1–3	2001 UEFA Women's Championship qualification
20	14 May 2000	Stirling, Scotland	Scotland	1–4	2001 UEFA Women's Championship qualification
21	17 June 2000	Zaprešić, Croatia	Czech Republic	1–2	2001 UEFA Women's Championship qualification
22	1 July 2000	Vranovice, Czech Republic	Czech Republic	0–5	2001 UEFA Women's Championship qualification
23	26 May 2001	Kecskemét, Hungary	Poland	0–3	Friendly
24	27 May 2001	Kecskemét, Hungary	Slovenia	8–2	Friendly
25	23 September 2001	Velika Gorica, Croatia	Israel	4–0	2003 FIFA Women's World Cup qualification
26	30 September 2001	Osijek, Croatia	Romania	2–2	2003 FIFA Women's World Cup qualification
27	16 October 2001	Zaprešić, Croatia	Estonia	3–0	2003 FIFA Women's World Cup qualification
28	28 October 2001	Łęczna, Poland	Poland	0–2	2003 FIFA Women's World Cup qualification
29	18 April 2002	Kuressaare, Estonia	Estonia	3–0	2003 FIFA Women's World Cup qualification
30	25 May 2002	Krapina, Croatia	Poland	0–3	2003 FIFA Women's World Cup qualification
31	1 June 2002	Câmpina, Romania	Romania	3–2	2003 FIFA Women's World Cup qualification
32	6 June 2002	Kyiv, Ukraine	Israel	1–2	2003 FIFA Women's World Cup qualification
33	19 April 2003	Breza, Bosnia and Herzegovina	Bosnia and Herzegovina	1–0	2005 UEFA Women's Championship qualification
34	14 May 2003	Pregrada, Croatia	Slovenia	5–0	Friendly
35	25 May 2003	Velika Gorica, Croatia	Republic of Ireland	0–0	2005 UEFA Women's Championship qualification
36	28 September 2003	Vrbovec, Croatia	Malta	3–0	2005 UEFA Women's Championship qualification
37	18 October 2003	Belišće, Croatia	Romania	2–3	2005 UEFA Women's Championship qualification
38	16 November 2003	Gozo, Malta	Malta	4–1	2005 UEFA Women's Championship qualification
39	10 April 2004	Dublin, Ireland	Republic of Ireland	1–8	2005 UEFA Women's Championship qualification
40	16 May 2004	Slavonski Brod, Croatia	Bosnia and Herzegovina	6–0	2005 UEFA Women's Championship qualification
41	2 October 2004	Bucharest, Romania	Romania	0–10	2005 UEFA Women's Championship qualification
42	7 May 2005	Đakovo, Croatia	Macedonia	4–0	Friendly
43	6 September 2005	Valletta, Malta	Malta	4–1	2007 FIFA Women's World Cup qualification
44	24 September 2005	Slavonski Brod, Croatia	Slovenia	3–5	2007 FIFA Women's World Cup qualification
45	29 October 2005	Slavonski Brod, Croatia	Bosnia and Herzegovina	2–0	2007 FIFA Women's World Cup qualification
46	29 March 2006	Vrbovec, Croatia	Malta	1–0	2007 FIFA Women's World Cup qualification
47	14 May 2006	Krško, Slovenia	Slovenia	0–3	2007 FIFA Women's World Cup qualification
48	20 May 2006	Zenica, Bosnia and Herzegovina	Bosnia and Herzegovina	1–2	2007 FIFA Women's World Cup qualification
49	22 October 2006		Macedonia	3–0	Friendly
50	18 November 2006	Adana, Turkey	Georgia	6–0	UEFA Women's Euro 2009 qualifying
51	20 November 2006	Tarsus, Turkey	Turkey	2–1	UEFA Women's Euro 2009 qualifying
52	23 November 2006	Tarsus, Turkey	Northern Ireland	1–5	UEFA Women's Euro 2009 qualifying
53	10 March 2007	Krško, Slovenia	Slovenia	0–3	Friendly
54	11 March 2007	Pregrada, Croatia	Slovenia	2–1	Friendly
55	4 November 2007	Strumica, Macedonia	Macedonia	3–1	Tournament
56	6 November 2007	Strumica, Macedonia	Armenia	4–0	Tournament
57	27 June 2008	Paide, Estonia	Malta	3–0	Tournament
58	29 June 2008	Rakvere, Estonia	Turkey	2–4	Tournament
59	2 July 2008	Rakvere, Estonia	Estonia	3–1	Tournament
60	15 December 2008	Adapazarı, Turkey	Turkey	2–2	Tournament
61	17 December 2008	Adapazarı, Turkey	Latvia	3–0	Tournament
62	11 April 2009	Virje, Croatia	Faroe Islands	1–3	Tournament
63	13 April 2009	Molve, Croatia	Lithuania	6–0	Tournament
64	16 April 2009	Koprivnica, Croatia	Bosnia and Herzegovina	3–2	Tournament
65	19 August 2009	Mionica, Bosnia and Herzegovina	Bosnia and Herzegovina	1–1	Friendly
66	21 August 2009	Slavonski Brod, Croatia	Bosnia and Herzegovina	1–0	Friendly
67	23 September 2009	Zaprešić, Croatia	France	0–7	2011 FIFA Women's World Cup qualification
68	26 September 2009	Niš, Serbia	Serbia	1–1	2011 FIFA Women's World Cup qualification
69	24 October 2009	Zaprešić, Croatia	Northern Ireland	0–1	2011 FIFA Women's World Cup qualification
70	12 March 2010	Kidričevo, Slovenia	Slovenia	1–1	Friendly
71	14 March 2010	Zagreb, Croatia	Slovenia	1–1	Friendly
72	27 March 2010	Vrbovec, Croatia	Estonia	0–3	2011 FIFA Women's World Cup qualification
73	31 March 2010	Vrbovec, Croatia	Iceland	0–3	2011 FIFA Women's World Cup qualification
74	9 May 2010	Vrbovec, Croatia	Serbia	1–2	2011 FIFA Women's World Cup qualification
75	20 June 2010	Besançon, France	France	0–3	2011 FIFA Women's World Cup qualification
76	22 June 2010	Reykjavík, Iceland	Iceland	0–3	2011 FIFA Women's World Cup qualification
77	22 August 2010	Tallinn, Estonia	Estonia	1–1	2011 FIFA Women's World Cup qualification
78	25 August 2010	Belfast, Northern Ireland	Northern Ireland	1–3	2011 FIFA Women's World Cup qualification
79	15 May 2011	Ludbreg, Croatia	Hungary	1–1	Friendly
80	17 May 2011	Zalaegerszeg, Hungary	Hungary	0–1	Friendly
81	20 August 2011	Županja, Croatia	Bosnia and Herzegovina	1–1	Friendly
82	22 August 2011	Gračanica, Bosnia and Herzegovina	Bosnia and Herzegovina	4–1	Friendly
83	22 October 2011	Vrbovec, Croatia	Netherlands	0–3	UEFA Women's Euro 2013 qualifying
84	27 October 2011	Vrbovec, Croatia	Slovenia	3–3	UEFA Women's Euro 2013 qualifying
85	19 November 2011	Jakovo, Serbia	Serbia	2–4	UEFA Women's Euro 2013 qualifying
86	24 November 2011	The Hague, Netherlands	Netherlands	0–2	UEFA Women's Euro 2013 qualifying
87	29 February 2012	Umag, Croatia	Slovakia	1–4	Friendly
88	2 March 2012	Umag, Croatia	Slovakia	0–1	Friendly
89	31 March 2012	Vrbovec, Croatia	England	0–6	UEFA Women's Euro 2013 qualifying
90	16 June 2012	Vrbovec, Croatia	Serbia	1–4	UEFA Women's Euro 2013 qualifying
91	15 September 2012	Velenje, Slovenia	Slovenia	0–1	UEFA Women's Euro 2013 qualifying
92	19 September 2012	Walsall, England	England	0–3	UEFA Women's Euro 2013 qualifying
93	7 March 2013	Rovinj, Croatia	Czech Republic	1–1	Croatia Cup 2013
94	8 March 2013	Poreč, Croatia	Slovenia	0–2	Croatia Cup 2013
95	11 March 2013	Rovinj, Croatia	Slovakia	1–0	Croatia Cup 2013
96	26 September 2013	Sinj, Croatia	Republic of Ireland	1–1	2015 FIFA Women's World Cup qualification
97	26 October 2013	Sesvete, Croatia	Slovakia	0–1	2015 FIFA Women's World Cup qualification
98	30 October 2013	Frankfurt, Germany	Germany	0–4	2015 FIFA Women's World Cup qualification
99	27 November 2013	Osijek, Croatia	Germany	0–8	2015 FIFA Women's World Cup qualification
100	7 March 2014	Umag, Croatia	Hungary	2–2	Istria Women's Cup
101	9 March 2014	Umag, Croatia	Poland	1–3	Istria Women's Cup
102	9 April 2014	Moscow, Russia	Russia	0–1	2015 FIFA Women's World Cup qualification
103	8 May 2014	Ptuj, Slovenia	Slovenia	3–0	2015 FIFA Women's World Cup qualification
104	14 June 2014	Dublin, Ireland	Republic of Ireland	0–1	2015 FIFA Women's World Cup qualification
105	19 June 2014	Senec, Slovakia	Slovakia	1–1	2015 FIFA Women's World Cup qualification
106	3 August 2014	Balatonfüred, Hungary	Slovakia	1–2	Balaton Cup
107	5 August 2014	Balatonfüred, Hungary	Hungary	1–3	Balaton Cup
108	13 September 2014	Zagreb, Croatia	Slovenia	1–0	2015 FIFA Women's World Cup qualification
109	17 September 2014	Zagreb, Croatia	Russia	1–3	2015 FIFA Women's World Cup qualification
110	4 March 2015	Rovinj, Croatia	Romania	0–0	2015 Istria Cup
111	6 March 2015	Buje, Croatia	Poland	0–0	2015 Istria Cup
112	9 March 2015	Umag, Croatia	Northern Ireland	2–1	2015 Istria Cup
113	11 March 2015	Poreč, Croatia	Wales	1–1	2015 Istria Cup
114	2 June 2015	Orašje, Bosnia and Herzegovina	Bosnia and Herzegovina	1–1	Friendly
115	4 June 2015	Županja, Croatia	Bosnia and Herzegovina	1–1	Friendly
116	31 August 2015	Belišće, Croatia	Albania	7–1	Friendly
117	2 September 2015	Osijek, Croatia	Albania	3–1	Friendly
118	17 September 2015	Erzurum, Turkey	Turkey	4–1	UEFA Women's Euro 2017 qualifying
119	22 September 2015	Zagreb, Croatia	Germany	0–1	UEFA Women's Euro 2017 qualifying
120	25 October 2015	Osijek, Croatia	Hungary	1–1	UEFA Women's Euro 2017 qualifying
121	30 November 2015	Rijeka, Croatia	Turkey	3–0	UEFA Women's Euro 2017 qualifying

=== 2023 ===
16 February 2023 Cyprus Women's Cup	Croatia	1–4	Finland	Larnaca, Cyprus
	Nevrkla 8'		Summanen 3'; Sällström 15'; Ahtinen 62'; Rantala 69'	Stadium: GSZ Stadium; Referee: Marta Huerta de Aza (Spain)

19 February 2023 Cyprus Women's Cup	Romania	0–2	Croatia	Larnaca, Cyprus
			Nevrkla 52'; Rudelić 57'	Stadium: AEK Arena

22 February 2023 Cyprus Women's Cup	Hungary	0–1	Croatia	Larnaca, Cyprus
				Stadium: AEK Arena

7 April Friendly	Greece	1–1	Croatia	Athens, Greece
12:00	Spyridonidou 18'	Report	Rudelić 62'	Stadium: Georgios Kamaras Stadium; Referee: Lotta Vuorio (Finland)

10 April Friendly	Greece	2–1	Croatia	Athens, Greece
11:00 UTC+3	Spyridonidou 50', 72'	Report	42'	Stadium: Georgios Kamaras Stadium

22 September Nations League B Gr 2	Croatia	2–1	Romania	Varaždin, Croatia
20:15	Rudelić 45+1'; Pezelj 54'	Report	Carp 31'	Stadium: Stadion Varteks; Referee: Maria Marotta (Italy); Assistant referees: Veronica Vettorel (Italy); Giulia Tempestilli (Italy); Fourth official: Deborah Bianchi (Italy)

26 September Nations League B Gr 2	Slovakia	4–0	Croatia	Senec, Slovakia
18:00	Hmírová 24', 60', 73'; Lemešová (yellow card) 30' (yellow-red card) 45+1'; Morávková 34'	Report	Krajinović (yellow card) 78'	Stadium: NTC Senec; Referee: Alexandra Collin (France); Assistant referees: Clémentine Dubreil (Italy); Nabila Zaouak (Italy); Fourth official: Emeline Rochebiliere (Italy)

27 October 2023–24 UEFA Nations League	Finland	3–0	Croatia	Helsinki
17:45	Sällström 6'; Kunštek 65' (o.g.); Franssi 90+3'	Report		Stadium: Bolt Arena, Referee: Désirée Grundbacher (Switzerland)

31 October 2023–24 UEFA Nations League	Croatia	0–2	Finland	Šibenik
18:00		Report	Summanen 5', 12'	Stadium: Stadion Šubićevac, Referee: Teresa Oliveira (Portugal)

1 December 2023–24 UEFA Nations League	Croatia	2–0	Slovakia	Velika Gorica
18:00	Krajinović 53'; Dordić 60'	Report		Stadium: Stadion Radnik; Attendance: 347; Referee: Hristiyana Guteva (Bulgaria)

5 December 2023–24 UEFA Nations League	Romania	0–1	Croatia	Bucharest
19:00 (20:00 EET)		Report		Stadium: Stadionul Arcul de Triumf; Referee: Rasa Grigonė (Lithuania)

=== 2024 ===
23 February 2023–24 UEFA Nations League play-offs	Croatia	0–3	Norway	Osijek, Croatia
		Report		Stadium: Opus Arena; Referee: Abigail Byrne (England)

27 February 2023–24 UEFA Nations League play-offs	Norway	5–0 (8–0 agg.)	Croatia	Stavanger
				Stadium: Viking Stadion; Referee: Veronika Kovarova (Czech Republic)
Note: Norway won 8–0 on aggregate, and therefore both teams remained in their respective leagues.

5 April Euro 2025 qualifying	Wales	4–0	Croatia	Wrexham
	Fishlock 4', 50'; Rowe 51'; James 56'	Report		Stadium: Racecourse Ground; Referee: Zuzana Valentová (Slovakia)

9 April Euro 2025 qualifying	Croatia	1–0	Ukraine	Zaprešić
		Report		Stadium: Ivan Laljak-Ivić Stadium; Referee: Zulema González (Spain)

31 May UEFA Euro 2025 qualifying	Kosovo	0–1	Croatia	Podujevo, Kosovo
17:00		Report	Rudelić 58'	Stadium: Zahir Pajaziti Stadium; Referee: Kristina Georgieva (Bulgaria)

4 June UEFA Euro 2025 qualifying	Croatia	2–0	Kosovo	Karlovac, Croatia
	Rudelić 15'; Marković 74'	Report		Stadium: Stadion Branko Čavlović-Čavlek; Referee: Michaela Pachtová (Czech Republic)

12 July Euro 2025 qualifying	Croatia	0–3	Wales	Karlovac, Croatia
		Report		Stadium: Stadion Branko Čavlović-Čavlek

16 July Euro 2025 qualifying	Ukraine	2–0	Croatia	Petar Miloševski Training Centre, Skopje (North Macedonia)
19:00		Report

25 October Euro 2025 qualifying play-off	Croatia	1-1	Northern Ireland	stadion Varteks, Varaždin, Croatia
18:00 CEST (UTC+01:00)	Lojna 4' (p)	Report	Lojna 90+2' (OG)

29 October Euro 2025 qualifying play-off	Northern Ireland	1-0	Croatia	Windsor Park, Belfast, Northern Island
20:00 CEST (UTC+01:00)	Wade 114'	Report

30 November Friendly	Croatia	1–1	Slovenia	Čakovec, Croatia
14:00 UTC+1	Slipčević 85'	Report	Kajzba 15'	Stadium: Stadion SRC Mladost; Attendance: 500; Referee: Filip Glavić (Croatia)

=== 2025 ===
21 February 2025 Nations League B	Croatia	0–4	Czech Republic	Pula, Croatia
19:00		Report	Stašková 15'; Khýrová 18'; Krejčiříková 29'; Svitková 63'	Stadium: Stadion Aldo Drosina; Attendance: 327; Referee: Abigail Byrne (England)

25 February 2025 UEFA Nations League	Ukraine	2–1	Croatia	Elbasan, Albania (Note: Due to the Russian invasion of Ukraine, Ukraine were required to play their home matches at neutral venues.)
18:00 UTC+1	Kotyk 2'; Kalinina 61'	Report	Nevrkla 69'	Stadium: Elbasan Arena; Attendance: 10; Referee: Shona Shukrula (Netherlands)

4 April 2025 Nations League B	Albania	4–0	Croatia	Shkodër, Albania
16:00	Berisha 14'; Hila 24'; Doçi 72'; Hamonikaj 90+1'	Report		Stadium: Loro Boriçi Stadium; Attendance: 436; Referee: Alexandra Collin (France)

8 April 2025 Nations League B	Croatia	1–2	Albania	Zagreb, Croatia
16:00	Slipčević 11'	Report	Berisha 32'; Balog 71' (o.g.)	Stadium: Sport Centre Rudes; Attendance: 377; Referee: Maria Marotta (Italy)

30 May 2025 Nations League B	Czech Republic	5–0	Croatia	Chomutov, Czech Republic
17:00	Khýrová 6'; Svitková 18'; Pochmanová 23'; Dubcová 47'; Polášková 53'	Report		Stadium: Letní stadion Referee: Karoline Wacker (Germany)

3 June 2025 Nations League B	Croatia	2–0	Ukraine	Karlovac, Croatia
19:00	Vračević 11'; Živković 52'	Report		Stadium: Stadion Branko Čavlović-Čavlek; Attendance: 238; Referee: Deborah Anex (Switzerland)

24 October Friendly	Croatia	1–3	Montenegro	Zmijavci, Croatia
15:00 UTC+1	Kurkutović 60'	Report	Kuč 18'; Tomašević 36'; Dešić 45+??'	Stadium: Stadion ŠRC Marijan Šuto Mrma

27 October Friendly	Croatia	2–1	Montenegro	Dugopolje, Croatia
12:00 UTC+1	Kurkutović 35', 49'	Report	Karličić 31'	Stadium: Hrvatski vitezovi stadium

28 November Friendly	Malta	3–2	Croatia	Ta' Qali, Malta
	Cuschieri 15'; Saliba 82'; Fareugia 84'		Kurkutovic 50'; Rudelic 51'	Stadium: Centenary Stadium

1 December Friendly	Malta	0–3	Croatia	Ta' Qali, Malta
			Maja Joščak 42'; Ivana Rudelić 48'; Karla Kurkutović 76'	Stadium: Centenary Stadium

=== 2026 ===
3 March 2026 2027 FIFA Women's World Cup qualification	Bulgaria	0–1	Croatia	Sofia, Bulgaria
11:00		Report (FIFA); Report (UEFA)	Vunić 80'	Stadium: Stadion Aleksandar Shalamanov; Attendance: 310; Referee: Araksya Saribekyan (Armenia)

14 April 2026 2027 FIFA Women's World Cup qualification	Croatia	1–0	Kosovo	Karlovac, Croatia
17:00		Report (FIFA); Report (UEFA)	Uka 13'	Stadium: Stadion Branko Čavlović-Čavlek, Attendance: 200; Referee: Lovisa Johansson (Sweden)

7 March 2026 2027 FIFA Women's World Cup qualification	Gibraltar	0–1	Croatia	Europa Point, Gibraltar
19:00		Report (FIFA); Report (UEFA)	Kurkutović 38'	Stadium: Europa Point Stadium; Attendance: 251; Referee: Ines Andrada (Portugal)

== See also ==
- Croatia women's national football team
- List of Croatia women's international footballers
- Croatian Football Federation
