= Dominika Škorvánková =

Slovak footballer (born 1991)

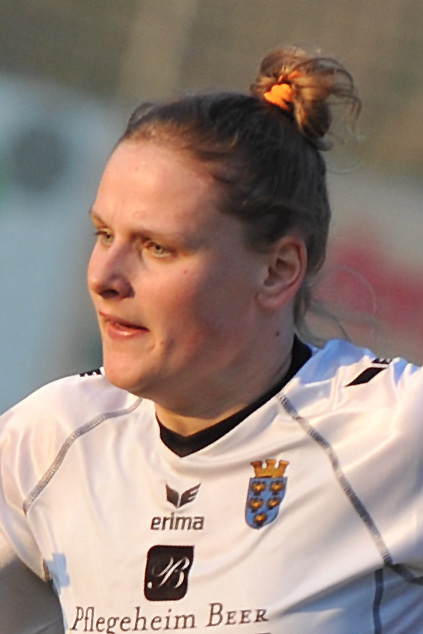
- Škorvánková with SV Neulengbach in 2014

Personal information
- Full name: Dominika Škorvánková
- Date of birth: 21 August 1991 (age 35)
- Place of birth: Dunajská Lužná, Czechoslovakia
- Height: 1.63 m (5 ft 4 in)
- Position: Midfielder

Team information
- Current team: Austria Wien
- Number: 38

Senior career*
Years	Team	Apps	(Gls)
–2005	Dunajská Lužná		
2005–2012	Slovan Bratislava		
2012–2015	Neulengbach	42	(20)
2015–2017	Sand	31	(6)
2017–2020	Bayern Munich	50	(2)
2020–2023	Montpellier	58	(6)
2023–2025	Como	32	(5)
2025–	Austria Wien	2	(1)

International career^{‡}
2005–2007	Slovakia U-17	3	(3)
2007–2008	Slovakia U-19	11	(1)
2009–	Slovakia	130	(17)
- * Club domestic league appearances and goals as of 04:04, 20 December 2025 (UTC) ‡ National team caps and goals as of 31 August 2025

Dominika Škorvánková (born 21 August 1991) is a Slovak footballer who plays as a midfielder for ÖFB Frauen Bundesliga club FK Austria Wien.

== Club career ==
She has also played for Slovan Bratislava in Slovakia's First League, SV Neulengbach in Austria's ÖFB-Frauenliga, SC Sand and Bayern Munich in the Bundesliga and Montpellier in French Première Ligue.

== International career ==
She is a member of the Slovak national team. On 10 April 2021, Škorvánková played her 100th match for Slovakia in a 0–0 draw with Mexico. In 2009, 2012, 2013, 2014, 2015, 2016, 2017, 2018, 2019, 2021 and 2022 she was named the SFZ Women's Footballer of the Year.

== International goals ==
No.	Date	Venue	Opponent	Score	Result	Competition
1.	26 October 2011	NTC Senec, Senec	Estonia	2–1	3–1	UEFA Women's Euro 2013 qualifying
2.	25 August 2012	Haapsalu Stadium, Haapsalu, Estonia	Estonia	2–0	2–0	UEFA Women's Euro 2013 qualifying
3.	26 September 2013	NTC Senec, Senec, Slovakia	Slovenia	1–2	1–3	2015 FIFA Women's World Cup qualification
4.	9 March 2015	Rovinjsko Selo, Rovinjsko Selo, Croatia	Hungary	2–1	3–1	2015 Istria Cup
5.	26 October 2015	NTC Senec, Senec, Slovakia	Moldova	3–0	4–0	UEFA Women's Euro 2017 qualifying
6.	4 September 2018	Shamrock Park, Portadown, Northern Ireland	Northern Ireland	1–0	1–0	2019 FIFA Women's World Cup qualification
7.	23 February 2024	LNK Sporta Parks, Riga, Latvia	Latvia	1–0	3–0	2023–24 UEFA Women's Nations League play-off matches
8.	25 February 2025	Anton Malatinský Stadium, Trnava, Slovakia	Moldova	1–0	1–0	2025 UEFA Women's Nations League

== Honours ==
ŠK Slovan Bratislava

- Slovak Women's First League: Champion 2008–09, 2009–10, 2010–11, 2011–12
- Slovak Women's Cup: Champion 2009, 2011, 2012

SV Neulengbach

- ÖFB-Frauenliga: Champion 2012–13, 2013–14

SC Sand

- DFB-Pokal: Runner-up 2015–16, 2016–17

FC Bayern Munich

- Bundesliga: Runner-up 2017–18, 2018–19, 2019–20
