= Anisa Rola =

Slovenian footballer

Personal information
- Full name: Anisa Rola
- Date of birth: 24 May 1994 (age 32)
- Place of birth: Maribor, Slovenia
- Height: 1.67 m (5 ft 6 in)
- Position: Defender

Youth career
- Maribor

Senior career*
Years	Team	Apps	(Gls)
2009–2014	Maribor	86	(46)
2014–2015	LUV Graz		
2016–2019	Maribor	30	(17)

International career
2010	Slovenia U17 (Note: Official UEFA matches only.)	3	(0)
2010–2012	Slovenia U19	9	(1)
2011–2016	Slovenia	24	(0)
- * Club domestic league appearances and goals

Anisa Rola (born 24 May 1994) is a retired Slovenian international football defender.

== International goals ==
No.	Date	Venue	Opponent	Score	Result	Competition
1.	26 September 2013	NTC Senec, Senec, Slovakia	Slovakia	1–0	3–1	2015 FIFA Women's World Cup qualification
