= Mária Mikolajová =

Slovak footballer

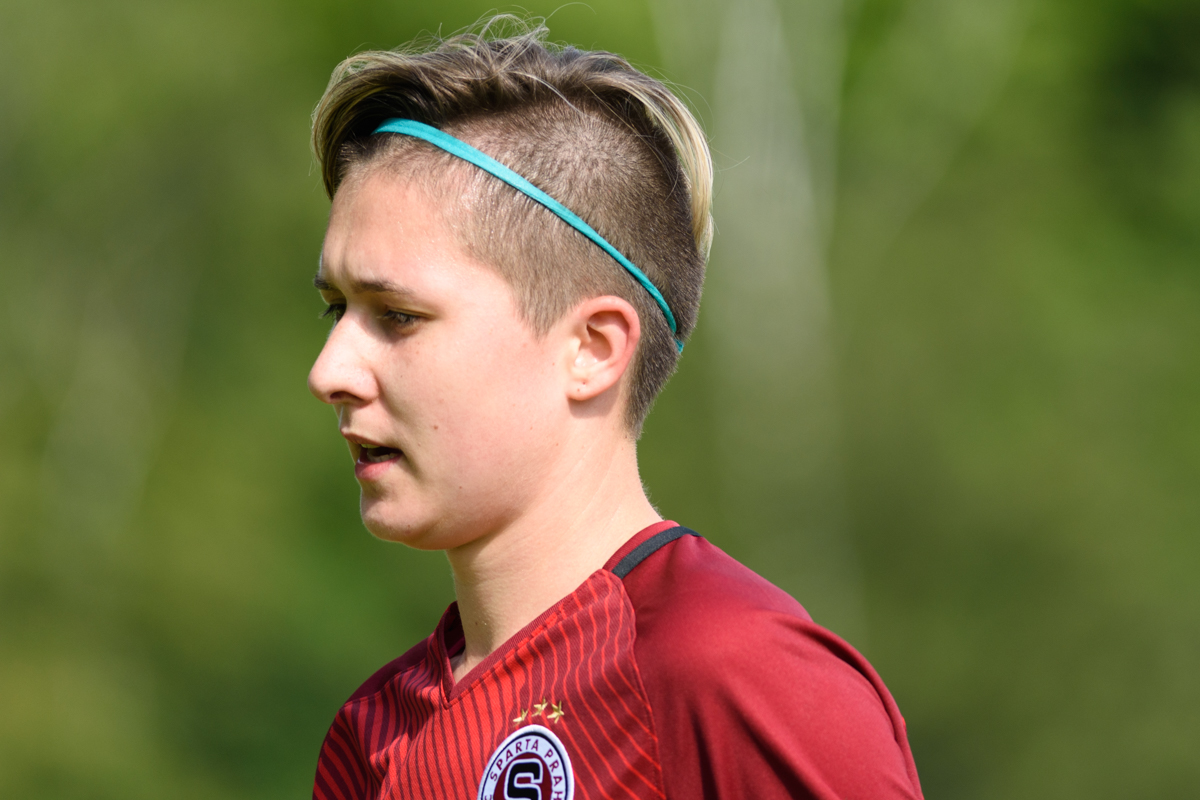

Personal information
- Date of birth: 13 June 1999 (age 27)
- Height: 1.68 m (5 ft 6 in)
- Position: Midfielder

Team information
- Current team: Slavia Prague
- Number: 17

Youth career
- OKŠ Spišský Hrušov
- FK Noves Spišská Nová Ves

Senior career*
Years	Team	Apps	(Gls)
?–2018	Partizán Bardejov		
2018–2019	Sparta Prague		
2019–2025	St. Pölten	95	(34)
2025–2026	Hamburger SV	21	(0)
2026–	Slavia Prague	4	(0)

International career^{‡}
2015–	Slovakia	92	(18)
- * Club domestic league appearances and goals as of 21 November 2026 ‡ National team caps and goals as of 29 August 2025

Mária Mikolajová (born 13 June 1999) is a Slovak professional footballer who plays as a midfielder for Czech Women's First League club Slavia Prague and the Slovakia national team.

== Career ==
Mikolajová has been capped for the Slovakia national team, appearing for the team during the 2019 FIFA Women's World Cup qualifying cycle.

In 2023 and 2024, Mikolajová was named the SFZ Women's Footballer of the Year. She won the award for the third time in a row for 2025.

=== International goals ===
Scores and results list Slovakia's goal tally first:

Mikolajová – goals for Slovakia
No.	Date	Location	Opponent	Score	Result	Competition
1.	7 August 2015	NTC Senec, Senec, Slovakia	United Arab Emirates	5–0	6–0	Friendly
2.	26 November 2016	Lučko, Croatia	Croatia	4–3	5–3	Friendly
3.	9 June 2017	NTC Poprad, Poprad, Slovakia	Greece	1–0	1–0	Friendly
4.	8 November 2018	Municipal Stadium of Prosotsani Georgios Makris, Drama, Greece	Greece	1–1	1–1	Friendly
5.	8 March 2020	AEK Arena, Larnaca, Cyprus	Mexico	2–0	2–2	2020 Cyprus Women's Cup
6.	23 October 2020	Illovszky Rudolf Stadion, Budapest, Hungary	Hungary	2–0	2–1	UEFA Women's Euro 2022 qualifying
7.	26 November 2020	NTC Senec, Senec, Slovakia	Iceland	1–0	1–3	UEFA Women's Euro 2022 qualifying
8.	18 February 2021	Hibernians Stadium, Paola, Malta	Malta	4–0	4–0	Friendly
9.	21 September 2021	Veritas Stadion, Turku, Finland	Finland	1–1	1–2	2023 FIFA Women's World Cup qualification
10.	26 October 2021	NTC Poprad, Poprad, Slovakia	Georgia	1–0	2–0	2023 FIFA Women's World Cup qualification
11.	22 February 2022	La Manga Club Football Stadium, La Manga, Spain	Poland	1–0	2–0	2022 Pinatar Cup
12.	31 October 2023	NTC Senec, Senec, Slovakia	Romania	1–0	1–0	2023–24 UEFA Women's Nations League
13.	5 December 2023	Anton Malatinský Stadium, Trnava, Slovakia	Finland	2–1	2–2	2023–24 UEFA Women's Nations League
14.	27 February 2024	Anton Malatinský Stadium, Trnava, Slovakia	Latvia	4–0	6–0	2023–24 UEFA Women's Nations League play-offs
15.	5 April 2024	NTC Senec, Senec, Slovakia	Israel	2–0	2–0	UEFA Women's Euro 2025 qualifying
16.	25 October 2024	NTC Poprad, Poprad, Slovakia	Wales	2–0	2–1	UEFA Women's Euro 2025 qualifying play-offs
17.	30 May 2025	Futbal Tatran Arena, Prešov, Slovakia	Gibraltar	6–0	11–0	2025 UEFA Women's Nations League
18.	30 May 2025	Futbal Tatran Arena, Prešov, Slovakia	Gibraltar	7–0	11–0	2025 UEFA Women's Nations League
19.	25 October 2025	NTC Senec, Senec, Slovakia	Ukraine	1–1	1–2	Friendly
