= UEFA Women's Euro 2013 qualifying Group 4 =

Football tournament qualification stage

The UEFA Women's Euro 2013 qualifying – Group 4 was contested by five teams competing for one spot for the final tournament.

== Standings ==
Team qualified for UEFA Women's Euro 2013
Team competes in Play-off round

Team	Pld	W	D	L	GF	GA	GD	Pts
France	8	8	0	0	32	2	+30	24
Scotland	8	5	1	2	21	12	+9	16
Wales	8	3	1	4	12	14	−2	10
Republic of Ireland	8	3	0	5	8	11	−3	9
Israel	8	0	0	8	1	35	−34	0

Source: UEFA.com

== Fixtures ==
All times are UTC+2.

14 September 2011
20:45

Israel	0–5	France
	Report	Eni 5' (o.g.); Franco 62'; Abily 71'; Le Sommer 86'; Delie 87'

Ness Ziona Stadium, Ness Ziona
Attendance: 137
Referee: Carina Vitulano (Italy)

17 September 2011
19:00

Wales	0–2	Republic of Ireland
	Report	D. O'Sullivan 27', 70'

Newport Stadium, Newport
Attendance: 440
Referee: Marina Mamaeva (Russia)

22 September 2011
20:45

Republic of Ireland	1–3	France
O'Gorman 90+2'	Report	Nécib 62'; Delie 69'; Le Sommer 74'

Turners Cross, Cork
Attendance: 2,235
Referee: Simona Ghisletta (Switzerland)

12 October 2011
11:00

Israel	1–6	Scotland
Lavi 35'	Report	Ross 5'; Beattie 9'; Little 48', 57'; Lauder 69'; Ravitz 72' (o.g.)

Ness Ziona Stadium, Ness Ziona
Attendance: 130
Referee: Ausra Kance (Lithuania)

22 October 2011
16:00

Republic of Ireland	2–0	Israel
D. O'Sullivan 74'; Grant 87'	Report

Tallaght Stadium, Dublin
Attendance: 1,010
Referee: Petra Chudá (Slovakia)
22 October 2011
19:00

Wales	1–4	France
Ludlow 2'	Report	Thiney 43', 74'; Le Sommer 67'; Delie 85'

Parc y Scarlets, Llanelli
Attendance: 522
Referee: Anastasia Pustovoitova (Russia)

26 October 2011
20:45

France	5–0	Israel
Thiney 15', 37', 38'; Bompastor 22' (pen.); Rubio 90'	Report

Stade de l'Aube, Troyes
Attendance: 10,159
Referee: Lina Lehtovaara (Finland)

27 October 2011
20:00

Scotland	2–2	Wales
Ross 19'; Beattie 44'	Report	Lea 4'; Lander 26'

Tynecastle Stadium, Edinburgh
Attendance: 1,061
Referee: Tanja Schett (Austria)

20 November 2011
16:00

Israel	0–2	Wales
	Report	Lander 8'; Ingle 88'

Ness Ziona Stadium, Ness Ziona
Attendance: 50
Referee: Caroline De Boeck (Belgium)

31 March 2012
20:50

France	2–0	Scotland
Dieke 64' (o.g.); Renard 70'	Report

Stade Jules Deschaseaux, Le Havre
Attendance: 9,028
Referee: Jana Adámková (Czech Republic)

4 April 2012
20:50

France	4–0	Wales
Thomis 9', 38', 50'; Abily 80'	Report

Stade Michel d'Ornano, Caen
Attendance: 16,738
Referee: Pernilla Larsson (Sweden)

5 April 2012
20:00

Scotland	2–1	Republic of Ireland
Jones 86'; Murray 87'	Report	D. O'Sullivan 4'

Tynecastle Stadium, Edinburgh
Attendance: 1,703
Referee: Katalin Kulcsár (Hungary)

16 June 2012
16:00

Scotland	8–0	Israel
Lauder 1'; Little 6', 25', 44'; Sneddon 9'; Love 15'; J. Ross 28'; Corsie 83'	Report

Tynecastle Stadium, Edinburgh
Attendance: 817
Referee: Pernilla Larsson (Sweden)
16 June 2012
18:00

Republic of Ireland	0–1	Wales
	Report	Lander 71'

Turners Cross, Cork
Attendance: 653
Referee: Sofia Karagiorgi (Cyprus)

20 June 2012
19:00

Wales	5–0	Israel
Harding 3', 28', 36'; Wiltshire 50'; Keryakoplis 72'	Report

Racecourse Ground, Wrexham
Attendance: 721
Referee: Karolina Radzik-Johan (Poland)

21 June 2012
20:30

Republic of Ireland	0–1	Scotland
	Report	Corsie 25'

Turners Cross, Cork
Attendance: 827
Referee: Teodora Albon (Romania)

15 September 2012
19:00

Wales	1–2	Scotland
Lander 38'	Report	Love 45'; Little 68'

Parc y Scarlets, Llanelli
Attendance: 560
Referee: Jenny Palmqvist (Sweden)
15 September 2012
20:50

France	4–0	Republic of Ireland
Thomis 8'; Le Sommer 13', 43'; Morel 86'	Report

Stade du Roudourou, Guingamp
Attendance: 10,284
Referee: Mihaela Gurdon Basimamović (Croatia)

19 September 2012
15:00

Israel	0–2	Republic of Ireland
	Report	O'Sullivan 65'; Russell 67'

Ramat Gan Stadium, Ramat Gan
Attendance: 132
Referee: Paloma Quintero Siles (Spain)
19 September 2012
18:00

Scotland	0–5	France
	Report	Delie 17', 72'; Le Sommer 34', 66'; Nécib 64'

Tynecastle Stadium, Edinburgh
Attendance: 731
Referee: Silvia Tea Spinelli (Italy)

== Goalscorers ==
7 goals

- (France) Eugénie Le Sommer

6 goals

- (Scotland) Kim Little

5 goals

- (France) Marie-Laure Delie
- (France) Gaëtane Thiney

4 goals

- (France) Elodie Thomis
- (Republic of Ireland) Denise O'Sullivan
- (Wales) Helen Lander

3 goals

- (Scotland) Jane Ross
- (Wales) Natasha Harding

2 goals

- (France) Camille Abily
- (France) Louisa Nécib
- (Scotland) Jen Beattie
- (Scotland) Rachel Corsie
- (Scotland) Hayley Lauder
- (Scotland) Joanne Love

1 goal

- (France) Sonia Bompastor
- (France) Corine Franco
- (France) Julie Morel
- (France) Wendie Renard
- (France) Léa Rubio
- (Republic of Ireland) Fiona O'Sullivan
- (Israel) Moran Lavi
- (Scotland) Rhonda Jones
- (Scotland) Christie Murray
- (Scotland) Megan Sneddon
- (Republic of Ireland) Ciara Grant
- (Republic of Ireland) Áine O'Gorman
- (Republic of Ireland) Julie-Ann Russell
- (Wales) Sophie Ingle
- (Wales) Hannah Keryakoplis
- (Wales) Amie Lea
- (Wales) Jayne Ludlow
- (Wales) Sarah Wiltshire

1 own goal

- (Israel) Oshrat Eni (playing against France)
- (Israel) Michal Ravitz (playing against Scotland)
- (Scotland) Ifeoma Dieke (playing against France)
