= SFZ Women's Footballer of the Year =

Top Slovak women's football award

- Sport: Association football
- Local name: Futbalistka roka
- Country: Slovakia
- Presented by: SFZ

History
- First award: 2001
- Editions: 23
- First winner: (Slovakia) Marcela Lukácsová
- Most wins: (Slovakia) Dominika Škorvánková (11 wins)
- Most recent: (Slovakia) Mária Mikolajová
- Website: Official website

The Slovak Football Association Footballer of the Year (Slovak: Slovenský futbalový zväz, SFZ Futbalistka roka) is an annual award given to the player who is adjudged to have been the best of the year in Slovak football. The award has been presented since 2001, with the criteria for selection changing over the years. The current holder is Mária Mikolajová, who won the award for 2023, 2024 and 2025.

The first winner of the award was Marcela Lukácsová of ZSNP Žiar nad Hronom. As of 2026, Jana Hanzelová, Eva Kolenová, Dominika Škorvánková, Mikolajová and Lukácsová have won the award on multiple occasions. Škorvánková has won the award a record 11 times.

== Winners ==
The award has been presented on 23 occasions as of 2025, with seven different winners.

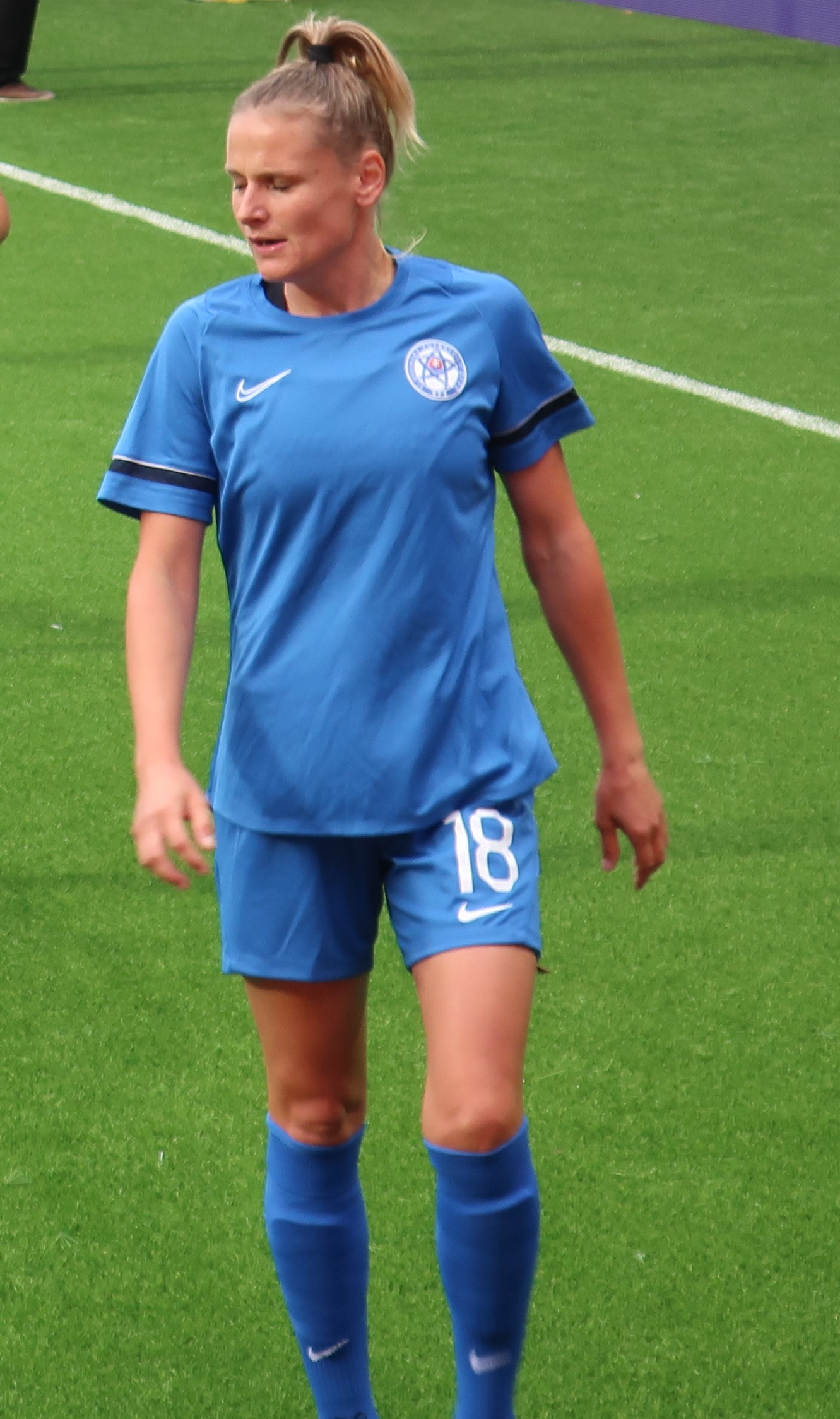
Dominika Škorvánková has won the Footballer of the Year award 11 times.

Year	Player	Club	Notes
2001	(Slovakia) Marcela Lukácsová	(Slovakia) ZSNP Žiar nad Hronom	First player to win the award
2002–03	(Slovakia) Marcela Lukácsová	(Slovakia) ZSNP Žiar nad Hronom	First player to win the award twice
2003–04	(Slovakia) Jana Hanzelová	(Slovakia) FC Rotox Nitra	
2004–05	(Slovakia) Jana Hanzelová	(Slovakia) Slovan Duslo Šaľa	
2005–06	(Slovakia) Eva Kolenová	(Slovakia) Slovan Duslo Šaľa	
2006–07	(Slovakia) Marcela Lukácsová	(Slovakia) MFK Malé Dvorníky	First player to win the award three times
2008	(Slovakia) Veronika Klechová	(Slovakia) Slovan Bratislava	
2009	(Slovakia) Dominika Škorvánková	(Slovakia) Slovan Bratislava	
2010	(Slovakia) Eva Kolenová	(Slovakia) Slovan Duslo Šaľa	
2011	(Slovakia) Eva Kolenová	(Slovakia) Slovan Duslo Šaľa	
2012	(Slovakia) Dominika Škorvánková	(Slovakia) Slovan Bratislava / (Austria) Neulengbach	
2013	(Slovakia) Dominika Škorvánková	(Austria) Neulengbach	
2014	(Slovakia) Dominika Škorvánková	(Austria) Neulengbach	
2015	(Slovakia) Dominika Škorvánková	(Austria) Neulengbach / (Germany) Sand	
2016	(Slovakia) Dominika Škorvánková	(Germany) Sand	
2017	(Slovakia) Dominika Škorvánková	(Germany) Sand / (Germany) Bayern Munich	
2018	(Slovakia) Dominika Škorvánková	(Germany) Bayern Munich	
2019	(Slovakia) Dominika Škorvánková	(Germany) Bayern Munich	
2020	(Slovakia) Mária Korenčiová	(Italy) Milan	
2021	(Slovakia) Dominika Škorvánková	(France) Montpellier	
2022	(Slovakia) Dominika Škorvánková	(France) Montpellier	
2023	(Slovakia) Mária Mikolajová	(Austria) St. Pölten	
2024	(Slovakia) Mária Mikolajová	(Austria) St. Pölten	
2025	(Slovakia) Mária Mikolajová	(Austria) St. Pölten / (Germany) Hamburg	

== See also ==
- Slovak Footballer of the Year Awards
