= Mária Korenčiová =

Slovak footballer (born 1989)

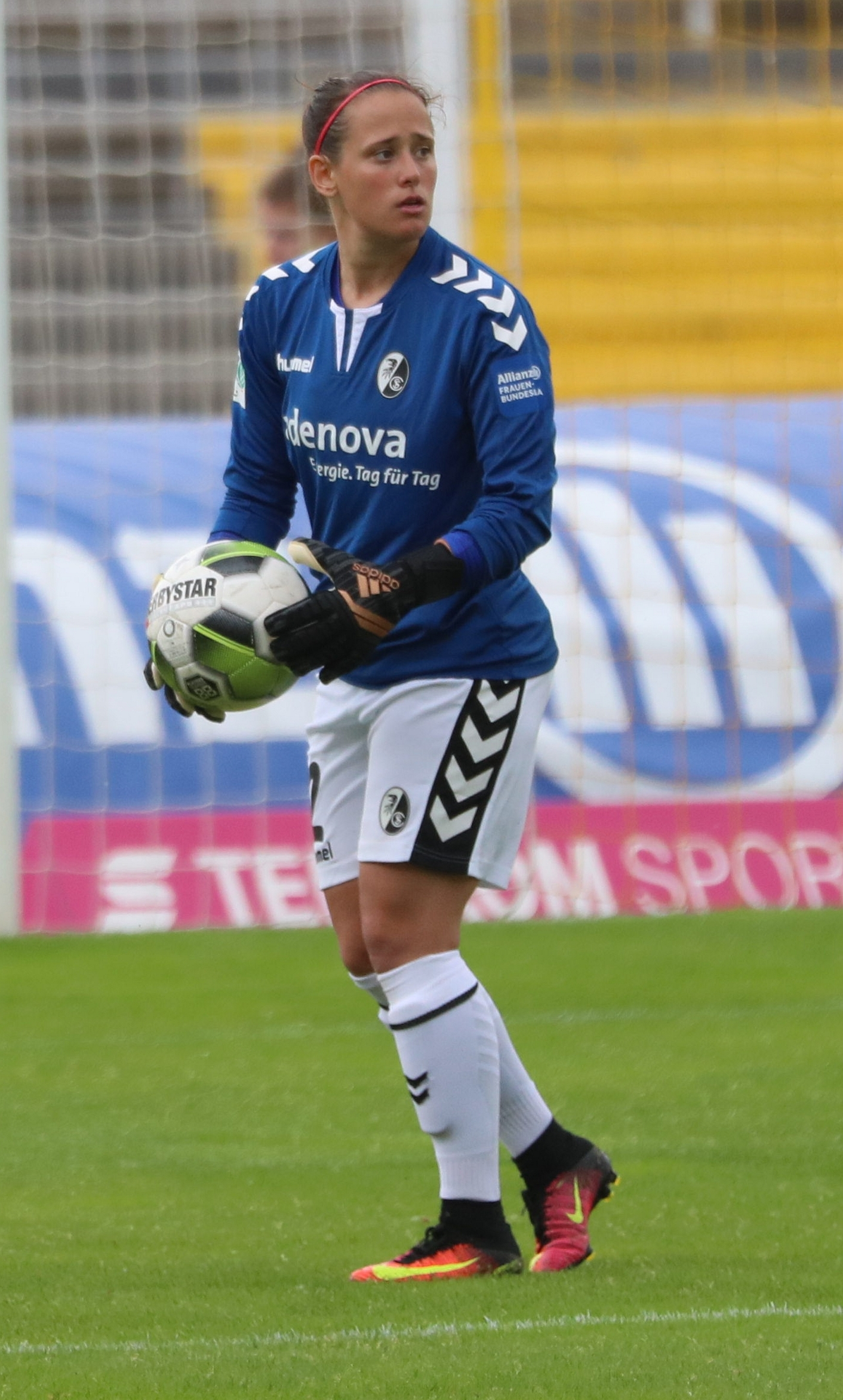
- Korenčiová playing for SC Freiburg in 2018

Personal information
- Date of birth: 27 April 1989 (age 37)
- Place of birth: Bratislava, Czechoslovakia (now Slovakia)
- Height: 1.63 m (5 ft 4 in)
- Position: Goalkeeper

Youth career
- FK Lamač

Senior career*
Years	Team	Apps	(Gls)
2005–2012	Slovan Bratislava		
2013	Slavia Prague	21	
2013–2016	Sand	18	(0)
2015–2016	Sand II	1	(0)
2016–2017	FC Neunkirch	25	(0)
2017–2018	SC Freiburg	9	(0)
2017–2018	SC Freiburg II	4	(0)
2018–2022	Milan	56	(0)
2022	Levante	9	(0)
2022–2024	Como	36	(0)
2024–2025	Freedom FC	28	(0)
2025–2026	Genoa		

International career^{‡}
2006–2026	Slovakia	130	(0)
- * Club domestic league appearances and goals as of 19 August 2025 ‡ National team caps and goals as of 19 August 2025

Mária Korenčiová (born 27 April 1989) is a Slovak former professional footballer who played as a goalkeeper.

== Club career ==
Korenčiová started her career in 2005 Slovan Bratislava, where she played for 8 years. Also in 2005 she made her debut in the UEFA Women's Champions League with Slovan and first played with the Slovak U-19 national team. She made her debut for the senior national team on November 23, 2006 in the 2009 EURO qualifiers' preliminary round, and since the 2011 World Cup qualifiers she has been its first-choice goalkeeper.

In the 2012–13 winter break she moved to Slavia Prague in the Czech league, and following the end of the season she signed for SC Sand of the 2nd Bundesliga, Germany's second tier. Sand was promoted to the first division for the 2014–15 season.

In July 2016, Korenčiová moved to Swiss Nationalliga A side FC Neunkirch.

In July 2018, Korenčiová joined Italian club AC Milan.

In 2021, Korenčiová was named the SFZ Women's Footballer of the Year for 2020.

In January 2022, after 3.5 years at Milan, Korenčiová left the club to join Spanish club Levante, signing until the end of the 2021–22 Primera División season. She returned to Italy with Como in July 2022.

On 8 September 2026, Korenčiová announced her retirement from football.
