= Ksenia Tsybutovich =

Russian footballer

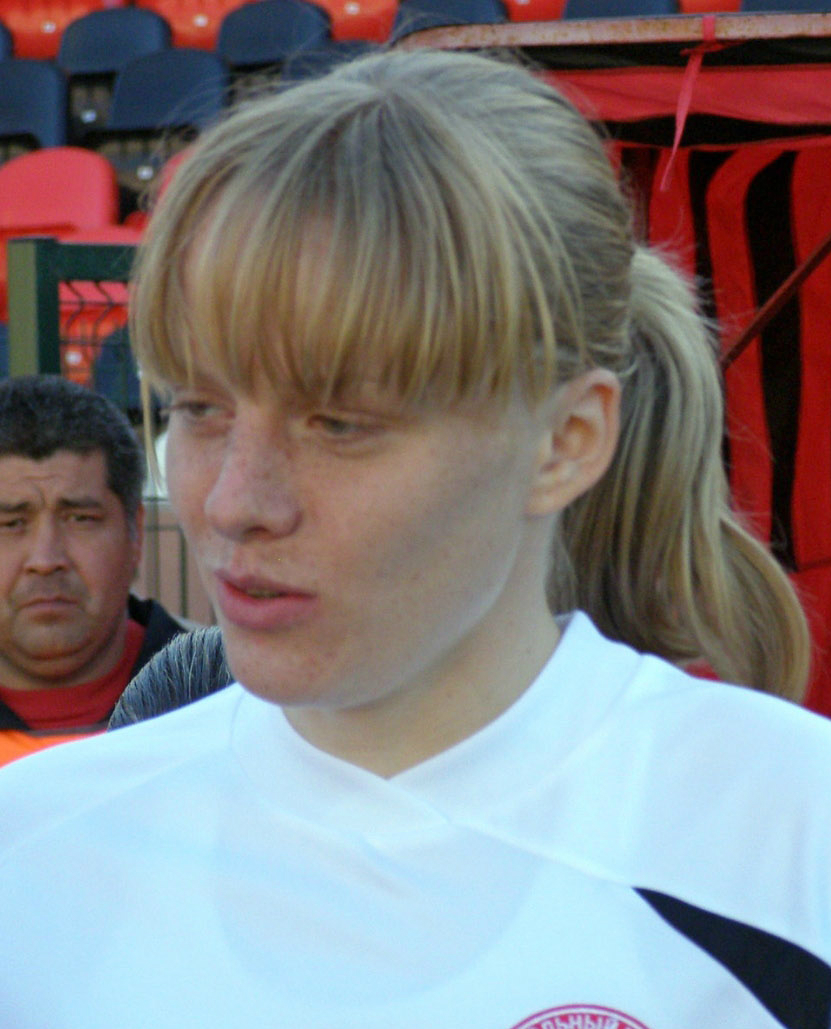

Personal information
- Full name: Ksenia Gennadyevna Tsybutovich
- Date of birth: 26 June 1987 (age 39)
- Place of birth: Moscow, Soviet Union
- Height: 1.75 m (5 ft 9 in)
- Position: Defender

Team information
- Current team: Zenit

Senior career*
| Years | Team | Apps | (Gls) |
| 2002–2003 | Chertanovo | | |
| 2004–2005 | Spartak Moscow | | |
| 2006–2008 | Rossiyanka | | |
| 2009–2012 | Zvezda Perm | 61 | (5) |
| 2012–2016 | Ryazan-VDV | 64 | (12) |
| 2017–2019 | CSKA Moscow | 40 | (15) |
| 2020 | Ryazan-VDV | 14 | (0) |
| 2021- | Zenit | 44 | (6) |

International career^{‡}
| 2003–2006 | Russia U19 | 28 | (5) |
| 2006–2017 | Russia | 79 | (7) |
- * Club domestic league appearances and goals as of 02:20, 25 November 2019 (UTC) ‡ National team caps and goals as of 13:42, 19 July 2013 (UTC)

Ksenia Tsybutovich (born 26 June 1987) is a Russian football defender, currently playing for Zenit in the Russian Championship. She has won four league titles with Rossiyanka, Zvezda Perm and Ryazan.

She is a member of the Russian national team, and took part in the 2009 and 2013 European Championships. As an Under-19 international she won the 2005 U-19 Euro, where she scored the decisive goal in the final's penalty shootout.

== Titles ==
- 4 Russian Leagues (2006, 2009, 2010, 2013)
- 4 Russian Cups (2006, 2008, 2012, 2014)

== International career ==
Goals scored for the Russian WNT in official competitions
| Competition | Stage | Date | Location | Opponent | Goals | Result | Overall |
|---|---|---|---|---|---|---|---|
| 2009 UEFA Euro | First Stage | 2009–08–28 | Helsinki | England | 1 | 2–3 | 1 |
| 2015 FIFA World Cup | Qualifiers | 2014–04–05 | Khimki | Slovenia | 1 | 4–1 | 3 |
| 2015 FIFA World Cup | Qualifiers | 2014–06–14 | Domžale | Slovenia | 1 | 2–1 | 3 |
| 2015 FIFA World Cup | Qualifiers | 2014–09–13 | Moscow | Germany | 1 | 1–4 | 3 |

== International goals ==
| No. | Date | Venue | Opponent | Score | Result | Competition |
|---|---|---|---|---|---|---|
| 1. | 28 August 2009 | Finnair Stadium, Helsinki, Finland | England | 1–0 | 2–3 | UEFA Women's Euro 2009 |
| 2. | 5 July 2013 | Melløs Stadion, Moss, Norway | Norway | 2–2 | 3–2 | Friendly |
| 3. | 5 July 2013 | Melløs Stadion, Moss, Norway | Norway | 3–2 | 3–2 | Friendly |
| 4. | 5 April 2014 | Rodina Stadium, Khimki, Russia | Slovenia | 3–1 | 4–1 | 2015 FIFA Women's World Cup qualification |
| 5. | 14 June 2014 | Domžale Sports Park, Domžale, Slovenia | Slovenia | 1–0 | 2–1 | 2015 FIFA Women's World Cup qualification |
| 6. | 13 September 2014 | Luzhniki Olympic Complex, Moscow, Russia | Germany | 1–1 | 1–4 | 2015 FIFA Women's World Cup qualification |
