= Tommy Gardner =

English footballer

Personal information
- Full name: Thomas Gardner
- Date of birth: 28 May 1910
- Place of birth: Huyton, England
- Date of death: February 1970 (aged 59)
- Place of death: Chester, England
- Height: 5 ft 9 1/2 in (1.77 m)
- Position: Wing half

Senior career*
Years	Team	Apps	(Gls)
1929–1931	Liverpool	5	(0)
1931–1932	Grimsby Town	13	(0)
1932–1934	Hull City	66	(2)
1934–1938	Aston Villa	77	(1)
1938–1945	Burnley	39	(3)
1945–1947	Wrexham	33	(4)

International career
1934–1935	England	2	(0)
- * Club domestic league appearances and goals

Thomas Gardner (28 May 1910 – February 1970) was an English professional association footballer who played as a wing half. He won two caps for the England national football team.

After the end of his playing career he was manager of Oswestry Town in 1949-51.

His great-granddaughter Hannah Keryakoplis played international football for Wales.
