= 2015 Istria Cup =

Tournament details
- Host country: Croatia
- Dates: 4–11 March
- Teams: 12 (from 2 confederations)
- Venue(s): 5 (in 4 host cities)

Final positions
- Champions: Poland (1st title)
- Runners-up: Slovakia
- Third place: Austria
- Fourth place: France B

Tournament statistics
- Matches played: 24
- Top scorer(s): Fanny Vágó (4)

The 2015 Istria Cup was the third edition of the Istria Cup, an invitational women's football tournament held annually in Croatia. It took place from 4–11 March 2015 at the same time as the 2015 Algarve Cup and 2015 Cyprus Cup.

== Venues ==
Stadium	City
City Stadium Buje	Buje
Veli Jože	Poreč
Valbruna	Rovinj
Rovinjsko Selo	Rovinjsko Selo
Umag/Umag 4	Umag

== Group stage ==
=== Group A ===
Team	Pld	W	D	L	GF	GA	GD	Pts
Slovakia	3	2	1	0	6	2	+4	7
Austria	3	2	1	0	4	1	+3	7
Hungary	3	0	1	2	2	5	−3	1
Republic of Ireland	3	0	1	2	1	5	−4	1

4 March 2015
11:30

Republic of Ireland	1–1	Hungary
Littlejohn 72'	Report	Vágó 57' (pen.)

Veli Jože, Poreč
Referee: Ivana Martincic
4 March 2015
15:00

Austria	1–1	Slovakia
Billa 71'	Report	Hmírová 74'

Veli Jože, Poreč
6 March 2015
11:30

Republic of Ireland	0–2	Slovakia
	Report	Šušková 52'; Klechová 73'

Umag, Umag
6 March 2015
14:00

Austria	1–0	Hungary
Makas 51'	Report

Umag 4, Umag
9 March 2015
11:30

Hungary	1–3	Slovakia
Zágor 15'	Report	Klechová 24'; Škorvánková 29'; Šušková 31'

Rovinjsko Selo, Rovinjsko Selo
9 March 2015
14:00

Republic of Ireland	0–2	Austria
	Report	Prohaska 26'; Burger 57'

Valbruna, Rovinj

=== Group B ===
Team	Pld	W	D	L	GF	GA	GD	Pts
Poland	3	2	1	0	4	0	+4	7
Croatia	3	1	2	0	2	1	+1	5
Romania	3	1	1	1	1	2	−1	4
Northern Ireland	3	0	0	3	1	5	−4	0

4 March 2015
11:30

Poland	2–0	Northern Ireland
Sikora 60'; Balcerzak 90+4'	Report

Rovinjsko Selo, Rovinjsko Selo
4 March 2015
14:00

Romania	0–0	Croatia
	Report

Valbruna, Rovinj
6 March 2015
11:30

Northern Ireland	0–1	Romania
	Report	Lunca 20'

Veli Jože, Poreč
6 March 2015
14:00

Poland	0–0	Croatia
	Report

City Stadium Buje, Buje
9 March 2015
11:30

Poland	2–0	Romania
Pajor 16'; Balcerzak 35'	Report

Umag, Umag
9 March 2015
14:00

Croatia	2–1	Northern Ireland
Baban 57' (pen.); Rudelić 70'	Report	Callaghan 8'

Umag 4, Umag

=== Group C ===
Team	Pld	W	D	L	GF	GA	GD	Pts
France B	3	1	2	0	4	3	+1	5
Wales	3	1	1	1	1	1	0	4
Costa Rica	3	1	1	1	1	1	0	4
Bosnia and Herzegovina	3	0	2	1	3	4	−1	2

4 March 2015
11:30

Costa Rica	1–0	Bosnia and Herzegovina
Acosta 12'	Report

Umag, Umag
4 March 2015
14:00

Wales	1–0	France B
	Report	Makanza 38'

Umag 4, Umag
6 March 2015
11:30

Bosnia and Herzegovina	0–0	Wales
	Report

Rovinjsko Selo, Rovinjsko Selo
6 March 2015
14:00

Costa Rica	0–0	France B
	Report

Valbruna, Rovinj
9 March 2015
11:30

France B	3–3	Bosnia and Herzegovina
Makanza 21'; Asseyi 31'; Bilbault 89'	Report	Kršo 13'; L. Kuliš 23'; Radeljić 87'

Veli Jože, Poreč
9 March 2015
14:00

Wales	1–0	Costa Rica
Davies 77'	Report

City Stadium Buje, Buje

== Knockout stage ==
=== Eleventh place match ===
11 March 2015
11:00

Northern Ireland	0–0	Bosnia and Herzegovina
	Report
Penalties
Callaghan (penalty scored); McGuinness (penalty scored); Myles (penalty scored); Timoney (penalty scored); Nelson (penalty missed)	4–5	(penalty scored) Hadžić; (penalty scored) Al. Spahić; (penalty scored) L. Kuliš; (penalty scored) Kršo; (penalty scored) Aleksić

Veli Jože, Poreč

=== Ninth place match ===
11 March 2015
11:00

Costa Rica	1–2	Republic of Ireland
Venegas 53'	Report	Roche 21'; Campbell 30'

Valbruna, Rovinj

=== Seventh place match ===
11 March 2015
11:00

Hungary	3–1	Romania
Vágó 4', 30', 70'	Report	Lunca 71'

Umag, Umag

=== Fifth place match ===
11 March 2015
14:00

Croatia	1–1	Wales
Joščak 41'	Report	James 68'
Penalties
Baban (penalty missed); Balog (penalty missed); Lojna (penalty scored); Šundov (penalty missed)	1–3	(penalty missed) Ward; (penalty scored) Wiltshire; (penalty scored) Hollinshead; (penalty scored) Bleazard

Rovinjsko Selo, Rovinjsko Selo

=== Third place match ===
11 March 2015
14:00

Austria	2–1	France B
Zadrazil 59'; Billa 61'	Report	Crammer 76'

Umag 4, Umag

=== Final ===
11 March 2015
15:00

Slovakia	0–2	Poland
	Report	Balcerzak 12'; Pajor 68'

Veli Jože, Poreč

== Final standings ==
Rank	Team
1st place, gold medalist(s)	Poland
2nd place, silver medalist(s)	Slovakia
3rd place, bronze medalist(s)	Austria
4	France B
5	Wales
6	Croatia
7	Hungary
8	Romania
9	Republic of Ireland
10	Costa Rica
11	Bosnia and Herzegovina
12	Northern Ireland
