= Hannah Keryakoplis =

Welsh footballer (born 1994)

Personal information
- Full name: Hannah Louise Keryakoplis
- Date of birth: 1 February 1994 (age 32)
- Place of birth: Penyffordd, Wales
- Position: Forward

Team information
- Current team: Wrexham
- Number: 33

Youth career
- Penyffordd Juniors
- Tranmere Rovers
- Liverpool

Senior career*
| Years | Team | Apps | (Gls) |
| 2010–2013 | Liverpool | 15 | (3) |
| 2013–2014 | Stoke City | 8 | (4) |
| 2014–2015 | Birmingham City | 12 | (2) |
| 2015–2019 | Stoke City | 68 | (46) |
| 2019–2023 | Derby County | 14 | (13) |
| 2023–2024 | Wrexham | 1 | (1) |

International career^{‡}
| 2011– | Wales | 20 | (3) |
- * Club domestic league appearances and goals as of 5 May 2020 (UTC) ‡ National team caps and goals as of 21:25, 6 January 2014 (UTC)

Hannah Louise Keryakoplis (born 1 February 1994) is a Welsh footballer who plays for Wrexham and the Wales women's national team as a striker. She has previously played for Liverpool, Stoke City, Birmingham City and Derby County.

== Club career ==
Keryakoplis was called into Liverpool Ladies' FA WSL squad for the 2012 season. She scored her first goal on 22 April 2012, in a 2–2 draw at Chelsea. Keryakoplis had made her first team debut during Liverpool's successful 2009–10 FA Women's Premier League Northern Division campaign.

In July 2013 she signed for FA Women's Premier League Northern Division newcomers Stoke City. Keryakoplis made just one appearance in the 2013 FA WSL season, as new signings including Natasha Dowie blocked her path to the first team. In January 2014 Keryakoplis returned to FA WSL level when she was signed by Birmingham City.

In July 2019, Hannah Keryakoplis signed for Derby County.

In July 2023, Hannah Keryakoplis signed for Wrexham.

== International career ==
After showing good form at Under–17 and Under–19 level, Keryakoplis made her senior Wales debut in October 2011, a 4–1 defeat to France in EURO 2013 qualifying.

== International goals ==
| No. | Date | Venue | Opponent | Score | Result | Competition |
|---|---|---|---|---|---|---|
| 1. | 20 June 2012 | Racecourse Ground, Wrexham, Wales | Israel | 5–0 | 5–0 | UEFA Women's Euro 2013 qualifying |
| 2. | 23 November 2013 | Gradski stadion, Nikšić, Montenegro | Montenegro | 1–0 | 3–0 | 2015 FIFA Women's World Cup qualification |

== Personal life ==
Keryakoplis is the great-granddaughter of the late England international footballer Tommy Gardner. She attended Castell Alun High School in Connah's Quay.
