= Church of Saint Nicholaus, Senec =

Church in Senec, Slovakia

Coordinates: 48°13′10″N 17°23′40″E

The Church of Saint Nicholaus in Senec, Slovakia, is located in the southwestern part of the town, which is the oldest historical building of it.

The church attained its current look in the middle of the 18th century. Before that the church had been rebuilt several times. Its basic style is Gothic. There is some evidence that a wooden church stood in its place in 1308. The structure has been reconstructed several times since. In 1633 it was in the Renaissance style, in 1740 the Baroque style. The last renovations were made in the 19th and 20th century. There are four altars in the church constructed in the rococo style.
