= Eva Kolenová =

Slovak footballer

Personal information
- Full name: Eva Kolenová
- Date of birth: 1 May 1985 (age 41)
- Place of birth: Bánovce nad Bebravou, Slovakia
- Position: Defender

Senior career*
Years	Team	Apps	(Gls)
2003–2005	Žiar nad Hronom		
2005–2012	Slovan Duslo Šaľa		
2012–	Altenmarkt		

International career^{‡}
2003–2014	Slovakia	20	(2)
- * Club domestic league appearances and goals ‡ National team caps and goals as of 21:33, 30 March 2015 (UTC)

Eva Kolenová (born 1 May 1985) is a Slovak football defender currently playing for SKV Altenmarkt in Austria's ÖFB-Frauenliga. She has played the UEFA Women's Cup with MŠK Žiar nad Hronom and Slovan Duslo Šaľa, and she has been a member of the Slovakia women's national team. In 2010 and 2011 she was named the SFZ Women's Footballer of the Year.

Goals scored for the Slovak WNT in official competitions
Competition	Stage	Date	Location	Opponent	Goals	Result	Overall
2009 UEFA Euro	Qualifiers	2006–11–20	Ettelbruck	Lithuania	1	3–0	1
2011 FIFA World Cup	Qualifiers	2010–06–23	Prilep	North Macedonia	1	6–1	1
2015 FIFA World Cup	Qualifiers	2014–08–21	Samara	Russia	1	1–3	1
