= Kaja Jerina =

Slovenian footballer

Personal information
- Full name: Kaja Jerina
- Date of birth: 11 September 1992 (age 34)
- Place of birth: Ljubljana, Slovenia
- Height: 1.79 m (5 ft 10 in)
- Position: Defender

Team information
- Current team: ŽNK Radomlje

Senior career*
Years	Team	Apps	(Gls)
2007–2009	ŽNK Senožeti		
2009–2013	ŽNK Jevnica		
2014	Merilappi United	10	(0)
2014–2015	ASD Pink Sport Time	9	(0)
2015	SV Henstedt-Ulzburg		
2015–	ŽNK Radomlje		

International career^{‡}
2011–	Slovenia		
- * Club domestic league appearances and goals as of 00:03, 1 September 2015 (UTC) ‡ National team caps and goals as of 21:25, 30 March 2015 (UTC)

Kaja Jerina (born 11 September 1992) is a Slovenian footballer playing for ŽNK Radomlje in the SŽNL and the Slovenia national team.

She started her career in ŽNK Senožeti, moving later to ŽNK Jevnica, and in 2011 she made her debut for the Slovenian national team. In 2014 she moved abroad, playing for Merilappi United in the Finland's Naisten Liiga, ASD Pink Sport Time in Italy's Serie A and SV Henstedt-Ulzburg in Germany's 2. Bundesliga before returning to the SŽNL to play for ŽNK Radomlje.

Goals scored for the Slovenian WNT in official competitions
Competition	Stage	Date	Location	Opponent	Goals	Result	Overall
2015 FIFA World Cup	Qualifiers	2014–04–05	Khimki	Russia	1	1–4	2
2015 FIFA World Cup	Qualifiers	2014–06–14	Domžale	Russia	1	1–2	2
