= Valentina Orlova =

Russian footballer (born 1993)

Personal information
- Full name: Valentina Orlova
- Date of birth: 19 April 1993 (age 33)
- Place of birth: Samara, Russia
- Height: 1.74 m (5 ft 9 in)
- Position: Defender

Team information
- Current team: Zvezda Perm
- Number: 13

Senior career*
Years	Team	Apps	(Gls)
2006–2012	CSK VVS Samara		
2012–	Zvezda Perm	109	(7)

International career^{‡}
2010–2012	Russia U19	13	(1)
2011–	Russia	8	(1)
- * Club domestic league appearances and goals as of 21:01, 30 March 2015 (UTC) ‡ National team caps and goals as of 26 July 2018

Valentina Orlova (born 19 April 1993) is a Russian football defender, currently playing for Zvezda Perm.

== International career ==
Goals scored for the Russian WNT in official competitions
Competition	Stage	Date	Location	Opponent	Goals	Result	Overall
2015 FIFA World Cup	Qualifiers	2014–04–05	Khimki	Slovenia	1	4–1	1

== Honours ==
Zvezda Perm

Winner

- Russian Women's Football Championship: 2014, 2015, 2017
- Russian Women's Cup: 2012, 2013, 2015, 2016

Runners-up

- Russian Women's Football Championship: 2013, 2016
