= Lucija Grad =

Slovenian footballer

Personal information
- Full name: Lucija Grad
- Date of birth: 22 October 1983 (age 43)
- Place of birth: Slovenia
- Position: Forward

International career^{‡}
Years	Team	Apps	(Gls)
2011–2014	Slovenia	18	(0)
- ‡ National team caps and goals as of 30 March 2015

Lucija Grad (born 22 October 1983) is a Slovenian football forward.
