= Helenna Hercigonja-Moulton =

American-born Croatian footballer

Personal information
- Full name: Helenna Louise Hercigonja-Moulton
- Birth name: Helenna Louise Moulton
- Date of birth: 28 April 1993 (age 33)
- Place of birth: Los Angeles, California, United States
- Position: Defender

Senior career*
Years	Team	Apps	(Gls)
2014	Medyk Konin		
2015–2018	Pomurje	47	(5)

International career
2010–2011	Croatia U19	7	(2)
2011–2015	Croatia	25	(2)
- * Club domestic league appearances and goals

Helenna Louise Hercigonja-Moulton (born 28 April 1993) is an American-born Croatian former footballer who played as a defender. She also plays for the Croatia women's national football team.

Her mother is Croatian and her father was born in Jamaica.

Goals scored for the Croatian WNT in official competitions
Competition	Stage	Date	Location	Opponent	Goals	Result	Overall
2015 FIFA World Cup	Qualifiers	2014–05–08	Ptuj	Slovenia	1	3–0	1
