= Fiona O'Sullivan =

Irish footballer (born 1986)

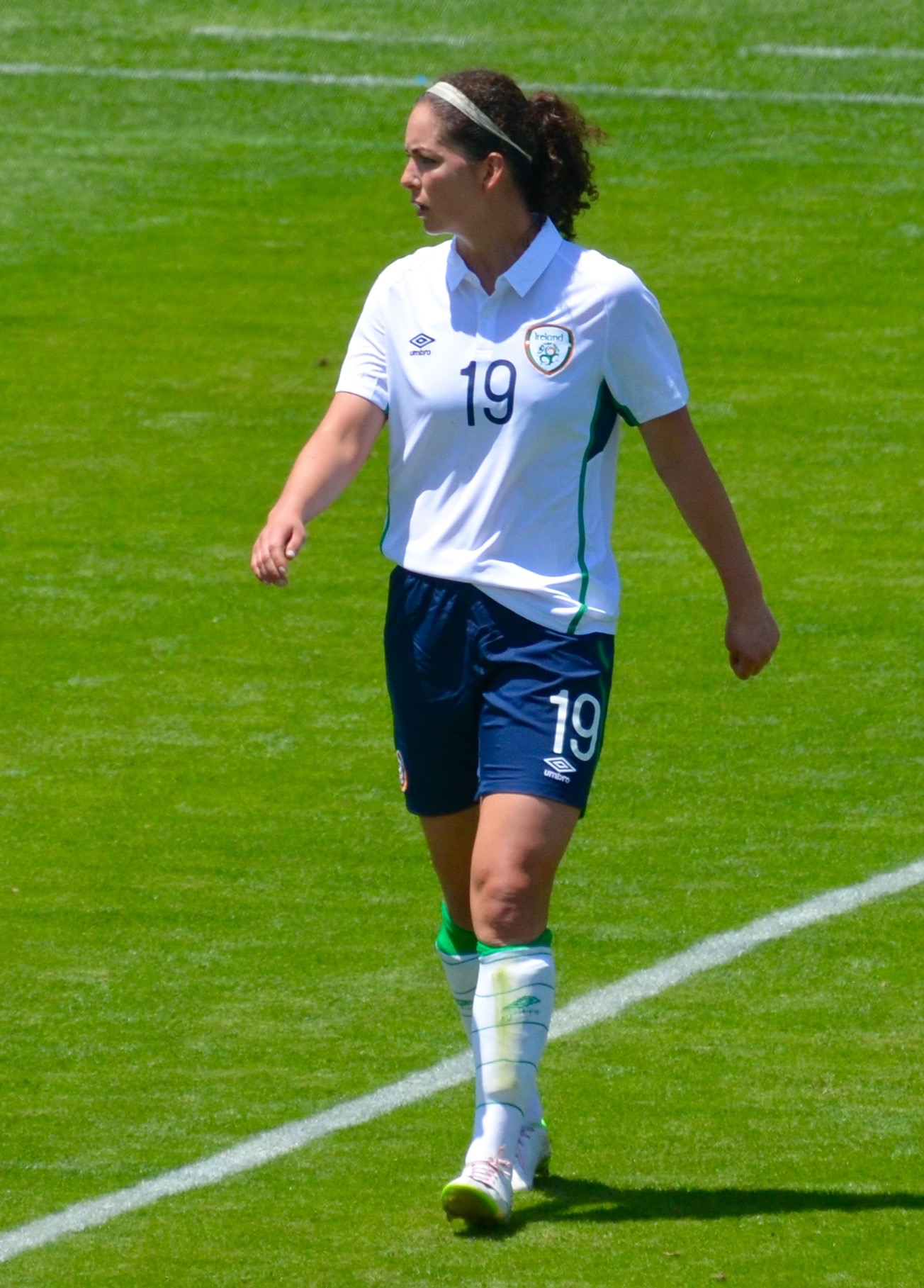
- O'Sullivan with the Republic of Ireland in 2015

Personal information
- Full name: Fiona Julia O'Sullivan
- Date of birth: 17 September 1986 (age 40)
- Place of birth: San Geronimo, California, U.S.
- Height: 1.78 m (5 ft 10 in)
- Position: Striker

College career
Years	Team	Apps	(Gls)
2004–2007	San Francisco Dons		

Senior career*
Years	Team	Apps	(Gls)
2006–2007	Sonoma County Sol		
2009–2010	California Storm		
2010	Chicago Red Stars	0	(0)
2010	AIK	7	(2)
2011	Piteå IF	9	(1)
2011	→ Kvarnsvedens IK (loan)	10	(12)
2011–2012	ASJ Soyaux	9	(4)
2012–2014	SC Freiburg	30	(12)
2014–2015	Notts County	8	(2)

International career
2009–2016	Republic of Ireland	41	(13)

Managerial career
- 2015–2017: San Francisco Dons (assistant)
- 2015-2017: De Anza Force
- 2017-: San Domenico School
- * Club domestic league appearances and goals

Fiona Julia O'Sullivan (born 17 September 1986) is a former footballer who played as a striker for clubs in the United States, Sweden, France, Germany and for English FA WSL team Notts County. Born and raised in the United States to an Irish father, she has been capped for the Republic of Ireland women's national team. She was described by the Football Association of Ireland (FAI) as a strong, imposing attacker.

Since retiring as a player, O'Sullivan has worked as a coach, trainer, speaker and mentor of young athletes. Her annual youth soccer camp in the San Francisco Bay Area, O’Sullivan Soccer Academy, reached its 20th anniversary in 2022.

== Early life ==
O'Sullivan was raised in Marin County, California where she began playing soccer as a youth. In four seasons with the varsity team at Sir Francis Drake High School (now Archie Williams High School), O'Sullivan finished as the team's top-scorer three times and league top-scorer twice. She was captain of the squad that made it to the Marin County Athletic League (MCAL) finals. O'Sullivan holds the record for career goals at the school, including a brace in a rivalry match against undefeated Marin Catholic in 2004.

In the summer of 2003, O’Sullivan founded her local soccer camp as a means to buy her first car. With only three signups in the first week, O’Sullivan enlisted her younger brother as her first counselor to have substantial numbers.

=== University of San Francisco ===
O'Sullivan attended the University of San Francisco from 2004 to 2007. She scored a total of eight goals for the San Francisco Dons in her four seasons. Her most successful varsity campaign was 2006, as she finished team top-scorer with five goals despite missing half the season with a knee injury. This included a hat-trick against the San Jose State Spartans. In 2007, during her senior year at San Francisco, O'Sullivan captained the squad and was the team's leading goal scorer. O’Sullivan was praised by head coach Pam Kalinoski as someone who could play at a higher level.

== Club career ==
=== United States ===
In the 2010 WPS Draft, O'Sullivan was selected by the Chicago Red Stars, but after attending their preseason training camp, was released from the initial 26-player roster in March 2010. O'Sullivan had previously accepted a call up to play for the Irish national team and travelled away with the Irish despite the Red Stars coach Emma Hayes asking her to stay and compete for her spot.

Instead O'Sullivan played the 2010 season with the California Storm, alongside soccer legends Brandi Chastain and Sissi. Seven goals in ten games saw O'Sullivan named to the all-league second team.

=== Europe ===
O'Sullivan signed a contract with Swedish Damallsvenskan club AIK in July 2010. After scoring two goals in seven games for AIK, O'Sullivan switched to Damallsvenskan newcomers Piteå IF in January 2011. Nine games for Piteå IF yielded one goal, before O'Sullivan was sent to Kvarnsvedens IK of Division 1 on loan in June 2011.

In December 2011 O'Sullivan left Sweden for French Division 1 Féminine club ASJ Soyaux. In the second half of the 2011–12 Division 1 Féminine season she contributed four goals in nine league games for Soyaux, as well as one in her single Coupe de France Féminine appearance, but the club finished in 11th place in the table and were relegated. This left O'Sullivan looking for a new club: "I thought if I go down with this team, I could lose a couple of years in my career playing in a second tier division when I felt like I should be playing in a higher one."

O'Sullivan signed for SC Freiburg of the Frauen Bundesliga in July 2012. Finding conditions in Freiburg more congenial than those in Sweden and France, she described Germany as a good fit. She made a strong start to the season, before the untimely death of her mother and a knee injury derailed her progress. Freiburg finished fifth in the 2012–13 Bundesliga table, as O'Sullivan scored six goals in 13 appearances.

During her time as a professional player, O’Sullivan continued building the O’Sullivan Soccer Academy each summer back in the United States. O’Sullivan fit in workouts before and after the long days of camp in the California summer heat to stay in shape, often flying back to Europe the night following the last day of camp. O’Sullivan described her summers as “unique and challenging.”

“I had to meet [SC Freiburg] in the Austrian Alps for preseason training,” O’Sullivan said. “I missed the fun day of rafting, and got there for the triple day fitness test. That was absolutely brutal after three weeks of camp.”

In June 2014, O'Sullivan scored a hat-trick in Freiburg's 7–2 win over BV Cloppenburg. It was her final game for the club, as she transferred to Notts County of the FA WSL later that month. O'Sullivan wrote her name in Notts County lore when she marked her debut with a televised equalising goal against Arsenal Ladies, wheeling away in delight to milk the acclaim of the Lady Pies faithful. She added another goal against Birmingham City to finish the 2014 season with two goals in five appearances. In January 2015 Notts County coach Rick Passmoor praised O'Sullivan's impact as she signed a one-year contract extension.

With the return to fitness of Notts County's main striker Ellen White, O'Sullivan's appearances were more sporadic in 2015. She featured as an 83rd-minute substitute in the 2015 FA Women's Cup Final at Wembley Stadium, which County lost 1–0 to Chelsea.

Despite the loss, O’Sullivan tabbed the match at Wembley as a highlight of her career.

“I was not fully aware of how special [Wembley] is to the English players. It's similar in nature to a mosque, church, or Mecca. Seeing my English teammates walking through the tunnel made me realize how big of a deal it was,” O’Sullivan said.

By then she had already agreed to quit professional soccer, to return to her alma mater as an assistant coach of the San Francisco Dons. She reported for her first training camp the day after the English Cup final.

== International career ==
O'Sullivan's father Aidan is from Bantry, Ireland while her mother is American. On the advice of her boyfriend, O'Sullivan sent an email to the FAI advising them of her eligibility for the Republic of Ireland women's national football team. She made her debut against FC Indiana during Ireland's summer 2009 training camp in the United States.

Strong performances followed in Ireland's qualifying games for the 2011 World Cup. In August 2010, after O'Sullivan scored a hat–trick against Israel and took her total to six goals in five games, she was hailed as "a revelation". O'Sullivan was named FAI International Player of the Year in February 2011.

After the initial flurry of goals O'Sullivan's form deteriorated and coach Susan Ronan eventually left her out of a squad in 2012. Ronan later recalled O'Sullivan and praised her response to being dropped: "she has come back stronger, hungrier and fitter than she's ever been, so credit to her". O'Sullivan scored another goal against Israel in Ireland's final 2013 UEFA Women's Championship qualifier. The Irish won 2–0 in Ramat Gan but were already out of contention for a place at the finals.

O'Sullivan missed Ireland's 2013 Cyprus Cup campaign with a knee injury sustained while training with her German club. In June 2013 she hit both goals as Ireland recovered from 2–0 down to draw 2–2 in a friendly with Austria at Tallaght Stadium in Dublin. Despite three goals from O'Sullivan, Ireland's 2015 FIFA Women's World Cup qualification campaign ended in failure. In January 2015 she scored in a 3–1 training match defeat by Norway at La Manga Stadium.

With Ireland struggling to score goals since O'Sullivan's move into coaching, coach Ronan recalled the clubless striker for a friendly against the United States in May 2015, her final match as a professional. The match was played at Avaya Stadium, just two hours south of O'Sullivan's home in California.

The Irish fell to the USWNT 3–0, the No. 2 team in the world at the time. However, it was an emotional curtain call for O’Sullivan, who played in front of those who had supported her since her days at Sir Francis Drake High School.

“I'd spent a decade in Europe playing. Although I am Irish, I grew up in San Geronimo and I have such a huge family here who has supported me through high school, college, and came to all my games,” O’Sullivan said. “When I played at Avaya, I heard such a roar when my name was announced. It was an entire career coming together.”

=== International goals ===
Scores and results list Ireland's goal tally first.

#	Date	Venue	Opponent	Result	Competition	Scored
1	24 September 2009	Turners Cross, Cork	Kazakhstan	2–1	2011 FIFA Women's World Cup Qual.	1
3	21 March 2010	Ness Ziona Stadium, Ness Ziona	Israel	3–0	2011 FIFA Women's World Cup Qual.	2
6	25 August 2010	Carlisle Grounds, Bray	Israel	3–0	2011 FIFA Women's World Cup Qual.	3
7	19 September 2012	Ramat Gan Stadium, Ramat Gan	Israel	2–0	2013 UEFA Women's Championship Qual.	1
9	18 June 2013	Tallaght Stadium, Dublin	Austria	2–2	Friendly	2
10	30 October 2013	Ob Jezeru City Stadium, Velenje	Slovenia	3–0	2015 FIFA Women's World Cup Qual.	1
11	7 May 2014	Tallaght Stadium, Dublin	Russia	1–3	2015 FIFA Women's World Cup Qual.	1
12	20 August 2014	Tallaght Stadium, Dublin	Slovenia	2–0	2015 FIFA Women's World Cup Qual.	1
13	15 January 2015	La Manga Stadium, La Manga	Norway	1–3	Friendly	1
14	7 June 2016	Tallaght Stadium, Dublin	Montenegro	9–0	2017 UEFA Women's Championship Qual.	1

== Personal life ==
O’Sullivan graduated from the University of San Francisco with a degree in international politics.

In August 2014, O'Sullivan was bereaved by the sudden death of her fiancé Devougn Lamont, a 30-year-old professional basketball player.

From 2015 to 2017, O’Sullivan was the University of San Francisco women's soccer assistant coach and recruiting director while simultaneously working for local youth club De Anza Force as the age group coordinator and recruiting director. In 2016 while at her alma mater, O’Sullivan met current husband Steve Domecus. Domecus, a former professional baseball player, was an assistant coach for the Dons’ baseball team. Domecus and O’Sullivan currently live in Fairfax, California, and have two kids.

Since 2017, O’Sullivan has worked as the soccer director for San Domenico School, where she also coaches the girls varsity team.

Her summer soccer camp, the O’Sullivan Soccer Academy, celebrated its 20th anniversary in 2022, and is currently flourishing in three locations throughout Marin and Sonoma counties in the Bay Area.
