= Rovinjsko Selo =

Rovinjsko Selo Villa di Rovigno
- Village
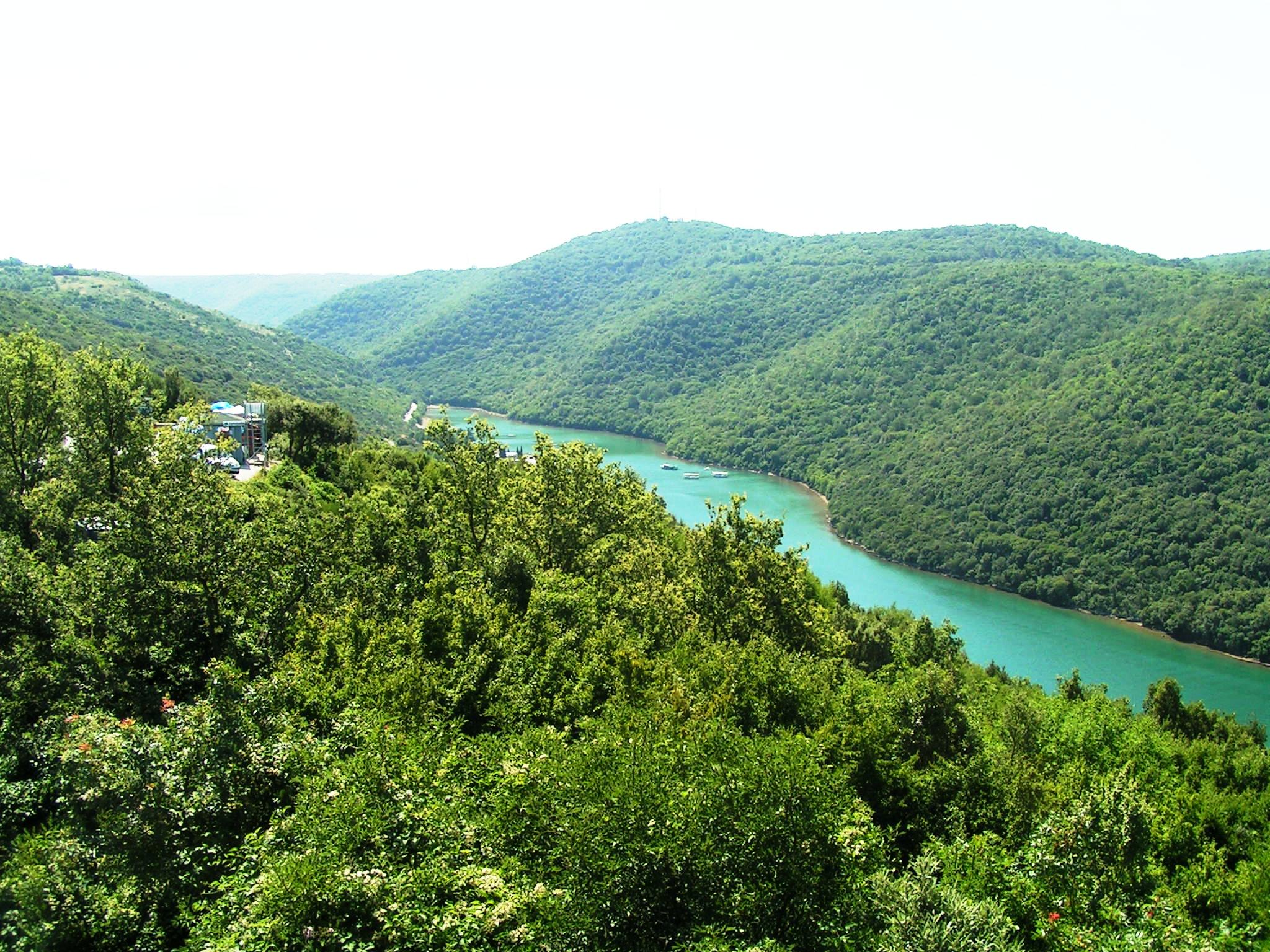
- Lim Bay, north of Rovinjsko Selo

- Location within Croatia
- Country: Croatia
- County: Istria County
- Municipality: Rovinj

Area
  - Total: 5.8 sq mi (15.0 km^{2})

Population (2021)
  - Total: 1,339
  - Density: 231/sq mi (89.3/km^{2})
- Time zone: UTC+1 (CET)
  - Summer (DST): UTC+2 (CEST)
- Postal code: 52210 Rovinj
- Area code: 052

Rovinjsko Selo (Italian: Villa di Rovigno) is a village in the municipality of Rovinj, Istria in Croatia. It is connected by the D303 road.

== Demographics ==
According to the 2021 census, its population was 1,339. It was 1,238 in 2011.

Historical population

Year	Pop.	±%
1857	490	—
1869	499	+1.8%
1880	578	+15.8%
1890	692	+19.7%
1900	740	+6.9%
1910	837	+13.1%
1921	841	+0.5%
1931	899	+6.9%
1948	726	−19.2%

Year	Pop.	±%
1953	662	−8.8%
1961	663	+0.2%
1971	593	−10.6%
1981	590	−0.5%
1991	649	+10.0%
2001	767	+18.2%
2011	1,238	+61.4%
2021	1,339	+8.2%

Source: DZS
