= Julie Morel =

French footballer (born 1982)

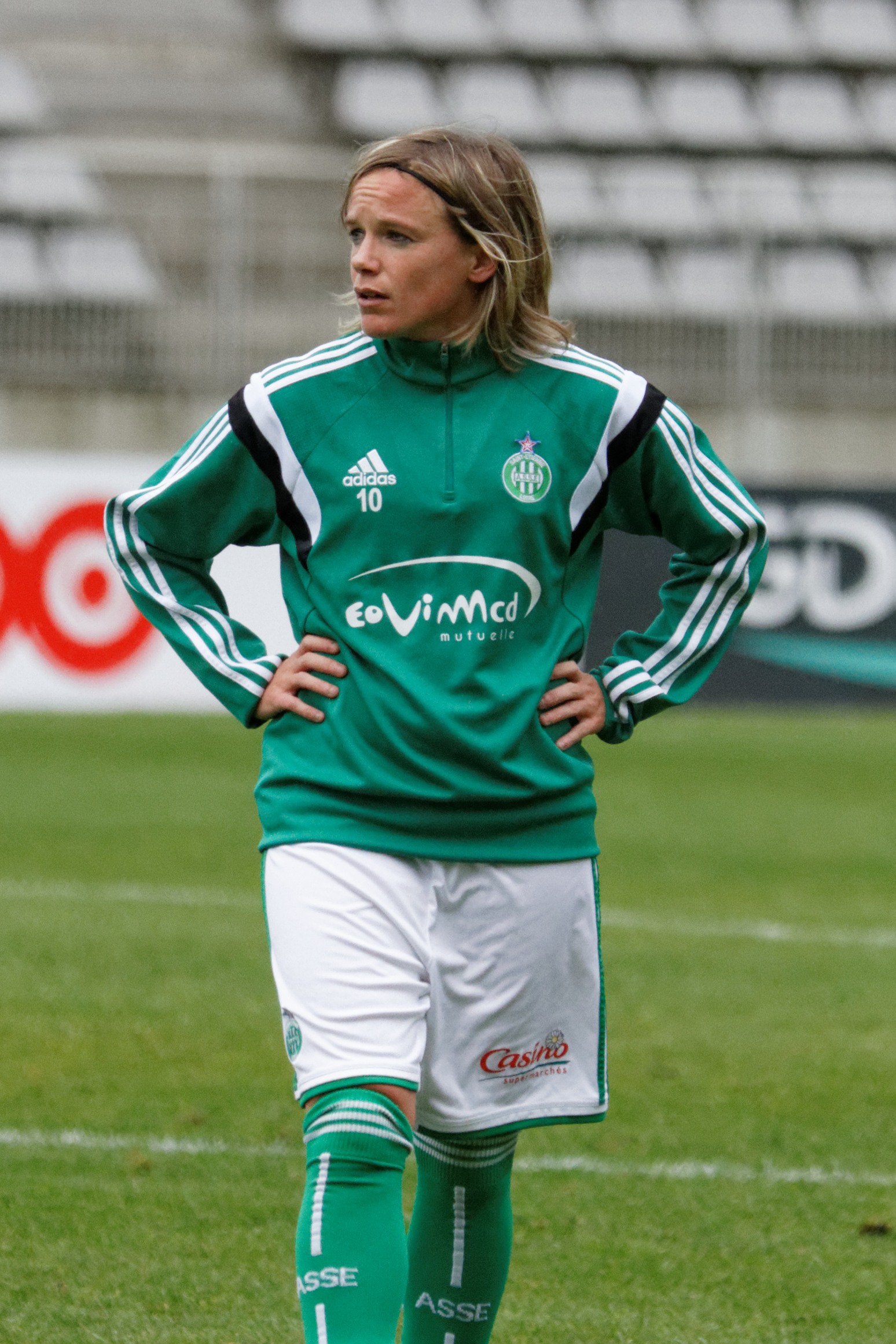

Personal information
- Date of birth: 6 August 1982 (age 44)
- Place of birth: Saint-Germain-en-Laye, France
- Height: 5 ft 2 in (1.57 m)
- Position: Midfielder

Senior career*
Years	Team	Apps	(Gls)
- EA Guingamp
- Saint-Étienne

International career
2012	France	1	(0)
- * Club domestic league appearances and goals

Julie Morel (born 6 August 1982) is a retired French footballer.
