= Lucia Šušková =

Slovak footballer

Personal information
- Full name: Lucia Šušková
- Date of birth: 27 March 1993 (age 33)
- Place of birth: Čadca, Slovakia
- Position: Midfielder

Senior career*
Years	Team	Apps	(Gls)
2010–2011	Žirafa Žilina		
2011–2013	Slovan Bratislava		
2013–2014	Neunkirch		
2014–2017	Mitech Żywiec		
2017–2020	Czarni Sosnowiec	39	(10)
2020	ROW Rybnik	5	(0)

International career^{‡}
2010–2011	Slovakia U19	5	(0)
2009–	Slovakia	19	(1)
- * Club domestic league appearances and goals as of 31 October 2020 ‡ National team caps and goals as of 21:41, 30 March 2015 (UTC)

Lucia Šušková (born 27 March 1993) is a Slovak footballer who plays as a midfielder. She has also played for Žirafa Žilina and Slovan Bratislava in Slovakia's First League, FC Neunkirch in Switzerland's Nationalliga A, TS Mitech Żywiec and Czarni Sosnowiec in the Polish Ekstraliga, and was a member of the Slovak national team.

Goals scored for the Slovak WNT in official competitions
Competition	Stage	Date	Location	Opponent	Goals	Result	Overall
2015 FIFA World Cup	Qualifiers	2014–06–19	Senec	Croatia	1	1–1	1

== Honours ==
Slovan Bratislava

- Slovak Women's First League: 2011–12
