= NTC Senec =

Football training center in Slovakia

- Interactive map of NTC Senec
- Full name: National Training Centre Senec
- Location: Senec, Slovakia
- Coordinates: 48.217703°N 17.410412°E
- Operator: Slovak Football Association
- Capacity: 3,264
- Surface: Grass
- Field size: 105 x 68 m

Construction
- Opened: 2003

Tenants
- MŠK Senec; ŠK Senec (2008–2016); FC Senec (until 2008)

NTC Senec (Národné tréningové centrum Senec) is a football training center of the Slovak Football Association and a multi-use stadium in Senec, Slovakia. It is currently used mostly for football matches and is the home ground of MŠK Senec and is occasionally used as a training ground for the Slovakia national football team. The stadium holds approximately 3,264 people.

The National Training Center in Senec is considered one of the most important projects of the Slovak Football Association, to which the International Football Association contributed as part of the "Goal" development program.

The field is also equipped with artificial lighting and a covered stand with a capacity of 150 spectators. There is also a training area with artificial turf measuring 50 x 30 meters, which is used for warm-ups and training of smaller groups.

== History ==
=== Construction in 2003 ===
Together with the other uncovered stands, the seating capacity for spectators around the main playing field is 3,264 seats, the construction was carried out by the ZIPP company around December 2001, the total value was estimated at 130 million crowns (4.333 million EUR). The ceremonial opening of the NTC Senec took place on September 6, 2003, in the presence of FIFA President Sepp Blatter and FIFA Executive Committee member Michel Platini.

== International matches ==
NTC Senec has hosted one men's international match – a friendly for the Slovakia national football team.

23 May 2014 International Friendly	Slovakia	2–0	Montenegro	Senec, Slovakia
20:20	Vladimír Weiss 45+1'; Erik Jendrišek 85'	Report		Stadium: NTC Senec; Attendance: 2,587; Referee: Bartosz Frankowski (Poland)

== Sources ==
- Národné tréningové centrum NTC Senec (in Slovak)
