= Senec, Slovakia =

Senec Szenc
- District town
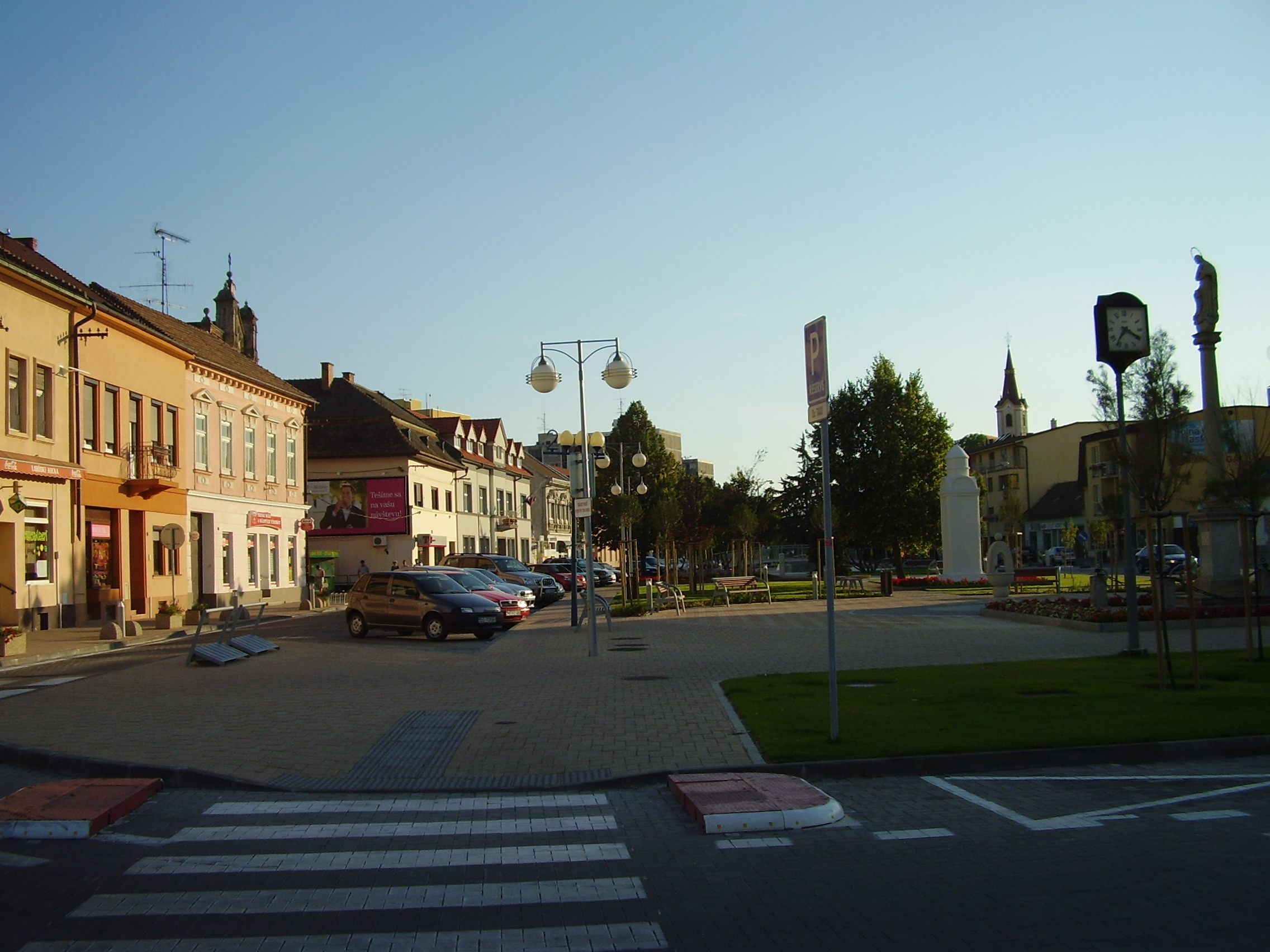
- Town centre of Senec

- Flag Coat of arms

- Location of Senec in the Bratislava Region Senec (Slovakia)
- Coordinates: 48°13′08″N 17°23′59″E
- Country: Slovakia
- Region: Bratislava
- District: Senec
- First mentioned: 1252

Government
  - Mayor: Pavol Kvál (independent)

Area
  - Total: 38.71 km^{2} (14.95 sq mi)
- (2022)
- Elevation: 148 m (486 ft)

Population (2025)
  - Total: 20,260
- Time zone: UTC+1 (CET)
  - Summer (DST): UTC+2 (CEST)
- Postal code: 903 01
- Area code: +421 21
- Vehicle registration plate (until 2022): SC
- Website: senec.sk

Senec (Hungarian: Szenc, German: Wartberg) is a town in the Bratislava Region of south-western Slovakia. The town is the administrative seat of the Senec District and its largest municipality. In 2022 it had a population of over 20,000.

The town is a summer tourism and recreation center well known for its summer resort Sunny Lakes (Slovak: Slnečné jazerá) and its proximity to Bratislava, the capital and largest city of Slovakia.

== Etymology ==
The town's contemporary name comes from a Slavic appellative seno, meaning hay, as the inhabitants dealt with cattle trade (see also Senica, Senné, Veľký Krtíš District or Senné, Michalovce District). Throughout its history the town name's form changed multiple times, in 1252 being written as Zemch, in 1451 as Sencz.

In German, the name Wartberg was historically used. The name is supposedly derived from a fortified hill upon which the Church of Saint Nicholaus stands to this day.

== History ==
In the 9th century, the territory of Senec became part of the Great Moravia. In the second half of the 15th century, Hungarian king Matthias Corvinus gave Senec privileges and it got the right of organizing a fair around 1480. In the 19th century, it started to develop after the Pressburg - Budapest railway which runs through the town had been built. After the Austro-Hungarian army disintegrated in November 1918, Czechoslovak troops occupied the area, later acknowledged internationally by the Treaty of Trianon. Between 1938 and 1945 Senec once more became part of Miklós Horthy's Hungary through the First Vienna Award. In 1945, it was recovered by Czechoslovakia. A number of residents were affected by the Beneš Decrees and 630 citizens who collaborated with Miklós Horthy's forces during occupation of Senec were forced to leave the town in 1947 to Hungary. This was a part of Czechoslovak-Hungarian post-war treaty regarding exchange of citizens signed by both, Hungary and Czechoslovakia. From 1945 until the Velvet Divorce, it was part of Czechoslovakia. Since then it has been part of Slovakia.

The historic Church of Saint Nicholaus is located in the southwestern part of the town.

== Geography ==
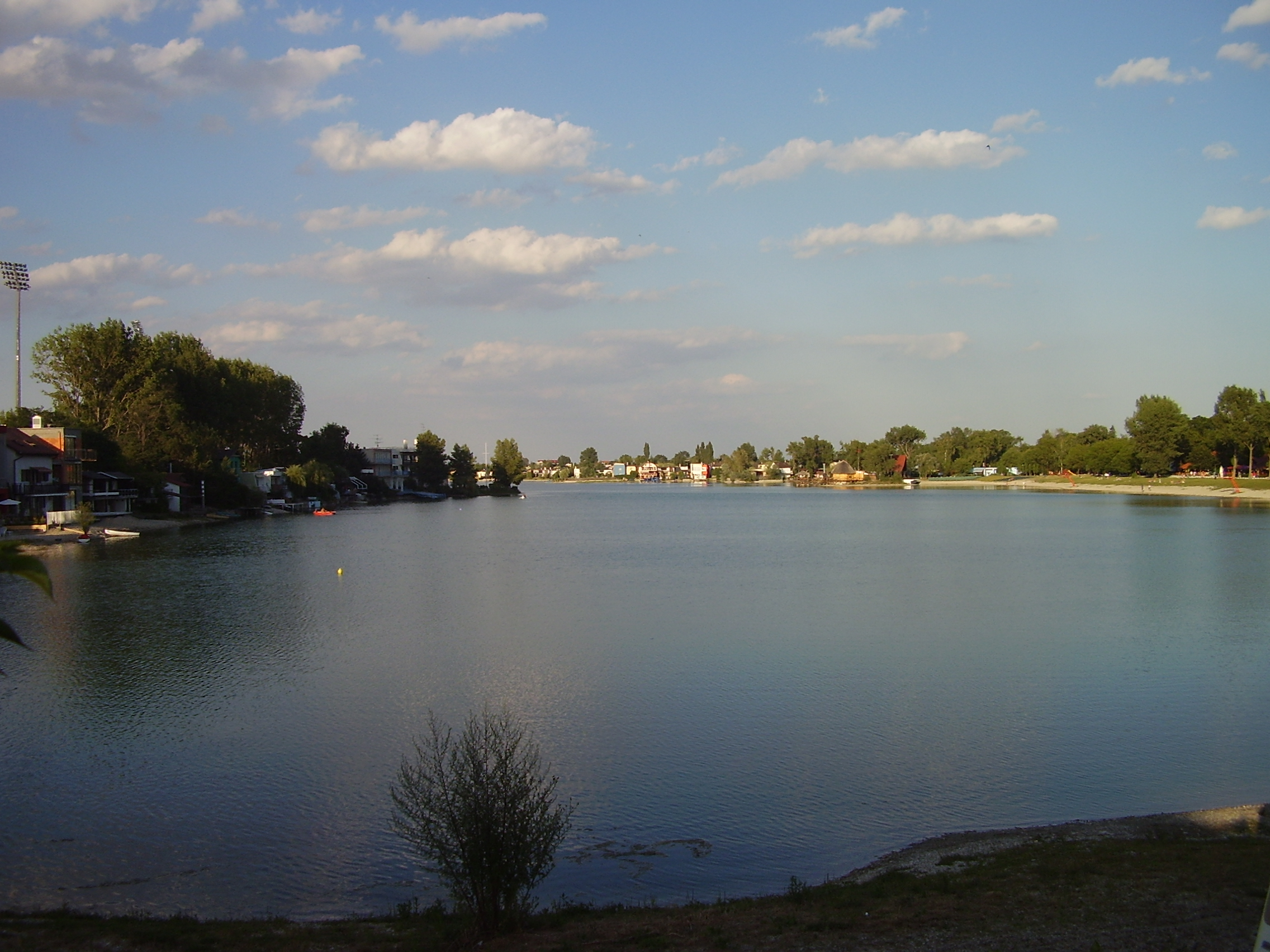
Slnečné jazerá ("Sunny Lakes") in Senec

The municipality lies at an altitude of 148 metres (486 ft) and covers an area of 38.71 km^{2} (14.95 sq mi) (2025).

Senec is situated in Podunajská nížina, on the boundary line of Podunajská rovina and Podunajská pahorkatina. The town is 27 km far from the Austrian boundary (frontier crossing at Kittsee), and 28 km far from the border with Hungary (frontier crossing at Rajka). Vienna (90 km), Budapest (230 km) and Prague (350 km) are the nearest European capitals.

The town is located 25 kilometres north-east from Bratislava, 126 m above sea level. It has good access to the motorway D1 from Bratislava to Žilina, and is situated on the significant 4th Corridor of Trans-European Transport Network Railway route Prague–Bratislava–Balkans/Orient.

The town consists of four boroughs (Senec, Svätý Martin, Červený majer and Horný dvor).

== Population ==
Historical population
Year	Pop.	±%
1970	8,531	—
1980	10,772	+26.3%
1991	14,357	+33.3%
2001	14,673	+2.2%
2011	17,050	+16.2%
2021	20,116	+18.0%
Source: Censuses

Population statistic (10 years)
Year	1995	2005	2015	2025
Count	14,850	15,357	18,658	20,260
Difference		+3.41%	+21.49%	+8.58%

Population statistic
Year	2024	2025
Count	20,234	20,260
Difference		+0.12%

It has a population of 20,260 people (31 December 2025).

In education, technical and secondary schools without the General Certificate of Education dominate with 27.91%. In 2001 graduates represented 11.17% share of Senec residents.

=== Ethnicity ===
Census 2021 (1+ %)
Ethnicity	Number	Fraction
Slovak	15,995	79.51%
Hungarian	2597	12.91%
Not found out	1739	8.64%
Czech	202	1%
Total	20,116	

In year 2021 was 20,116 people by ethnicity 15,995 as Slovak, 2597 as Hungarian, 1739 as Not found out, 202 as Czech, 139 as Other, 72 as Rusyn, 69 as Ukrainian, 46 as Russian, 45 as Romani, 38 as Romanian, 34 as German, 32 as Serbian, 19 as Polish, 15 as Albanian, 13 as Jewish, 13 as Croatian, 12 as Bulgarian, 10 as Vietnamese, 10 as Austrian, 8 as Korean, 8 as Greek, 6 as Turkish, 6 as Italian, 5 as Moravian, 5 as English, 4 as French, 3 as Chinese, 3 as Irish and 1 as Canadian.

Note on population: The difference values of population numbers in the table "Population statistic" and in the sections "Ethnicity" & "Religion" is caused by the use of various statistical methods.

=== Religion ===
Census 2021 (1+ %)
Religion	Number	Fraction
Roman Catholic Church	10,201	50.71%
None	5973	29.69%
Not found out	1678	8.34%
Evangelical Church	1193	5.93%
Greek Catholic Church	264	1.31%
Total	20,116	

In year 2021 was 20,116 people by religion 10,201 from Roman Catholic Church, 5973 from None, 1678 from Not found out, 1193 from Evangelical Church, 264 from Greek Catholic Church, 150 from Calvinist Church, 135 from Eastern Orthodox Church, 71 from Ad hoc movements, 59 from Christian Congregations in Slovakia, 55 from Other and not ascertained christian church, 55 from Other, 53 from Apostolic Church, 48 from Islam, 47 from Jehovah's Witnesses, 37 from United Methodist Church, 30 from Buddhism, 22 from Paganism and natural spirituality, 12 from Jewish community, 10 from Church of the Brethren, 9 from Seventh-day Adventist Church, 4 from Old Catholic Church, 4 from Hinduism, 3 from Baptists Church, 2 from Czechoslovak Hussite Church and 1 from Bahá'i Community.

== Twin towns – sister cities ==
Senec is twinned with:

- Ialoveni, Moldova
- Kőszeg, Hungary
- Milovice, Czech Republic
- Mosonmagyaróvár, Hungary
- Parndorf, Austria
- Senj, Croatia

== Asteroid ==
Asteroid 20664 Senec was named in honor of the Slovak town. The official naming citation was published by the Minor Planet Center on 25 September 2018 (M.P.C. 111797).

== See also ==
- FC Senec
