= 2020–21 in Slovak football =

Football in Slovakia
- Season: 2020–21

The 2020–21 season was the 26th season of competitive association football in Slovakia after Czechoslovakia was divided into two new states.

== Slovakia national football team ==
=== UEFA Nations League ===
Pos	Team	Pld	W	D	L	GF	GA	GD	Pts	Promotion or relegation
1	Czech Republic (P)	6	4	0	2	9	5	+4	12	Promotion to League A
2	Scotland	6	3	1	2	5	4	+1	10	
3	Israel	6	2	2	2	7	7	0	8	
4	Slovakia (R)	6	1	1	4	5	10	−5	4	Relegation to League C

Source: UEFA
(P) Promoted; (R) Relegated

4 September 2020	Slovakia	1–3	Czech Republic	Tehelné pole, Bratislava
20:45	Schranz 88'	Report	Coufal 48'; Dočkal 53' (pen.); Krmenčík 86'	Attendance: 0 (Note: Due to the COVID-19 pandemic in Europe, all matches scheduled for September 2020 were played behind closed doors.); Referee: Andris Treimanis (Latvia)

7 September 2020	Israel	1–1	Slovakia	Netanya Stadium, Netanya
20:45 (21:45 UTC+3)	Elmkies 90+1'	Report	Ďuriš 14'	Attendance: 0 Referee: Nikola Dabanović (Montenegro)

11 October 2020	Scotland	1–0	Slovakia	Hampden Park, Glasgow
20:45 (19:45 UTC+1)	Dykes 54'	Report		Attendance: 93 (Note: Due to the COVID-19 pandemic in Europe, the match was played behind closed doors.); Referee: Davide Massa (Italy)

14 October 2020	Slovakia	2–3	Israel	Anton Malatinský Stadium, Trnava
20:45	Hamšík 16'; Mak 38'	Report	Zahavi 68', 76', 89'	Attendance: 0 Referee: Alejandro Hernández Hernández (Spain)

15 November 2020	Slovakia	1–0	Scotland	Anton Malatinský Stadium, Trnava
15:00	Greguš 32'	Report		Attendance: 0 Referee: István Kovács (Romania)

18 November 2020	Czech Republic	2–0	Slovakia	Doosan Arena, Plzeň
20:45	Souček 17'; Ondrášek 55'	Report		Attendance: 0 Referee: Cüneyt Çakır (Turkey)

=== UEFA Euro 2020 qualifying play-offs ===
The winner of Path B, Slovakia, entered Group E in the final tournament.

Bracket

Semi-finals
8 October 2020 – Sarajevo
Bosnia and Herzegovina	1 (3)
Northern Ireland (p)	1 (4)
8 October 2020 – Bratislava
Slovakia (p)	0 (4)
Republic of Ireland	0 (2)

Final
12 November 2020 – Belfast
Northern Ireland	1
Slovakia (a.e.t.)	2

Semi-final

8 October 2020
20:45

Slovakia	0–0 (a.e.t.)	Republic of Ireland
	Report
Penalties
Hamšík (penalty scored); Hrošovský (penalty scored); Haraslín (penalty scored); Greguš (penalty scored)	4–2	(penalty scored) Hourihane; (penalty scored) Brady; (penalty missed) Browne; (penalty missed) Doherty

Tehelné pole, Bratislava
Attendance: 0 (Note: The Slovakia v Republic of Ireland match was played behind closed doors due to the COVID-19 pandemic in Slovakia.)
Referee: Clément Turpin (France)

Final

12 November 2020
20:45 (19:45 UTC±0)

Northern Ireland	1–2 (a.e.t.)	Slovakia
Škriniar 88' (o.g.)	Report	Kucka 17'; Ďuriš 110'

Windsor Park, Belfast
Attendance: 1,060
Referee: Felix Brych (Germany)

=== 2022 FIFA World Cup qualification ===
Pos	Team	Pld	W	D	L	GF	GA	GD	Pts	Qualification
1	Croatia	10	7	2	1	21	4	+17	23	Qualification for 2022 FIFA World Cup
2	Russia (Note: On 28 February 2022, FIFA suspended Russia from international competitions due to the Russian invasion of Ukraine.)	10	7	1	2	19	6	+13	22	Advance to play-offs
3	Slovakia	10	3	5	2	17	10	+7	14	
4	Slovenia	10	4	2	4	13	12	+1	14	
5	Cyprus	10	1	2	7	4	21	−17	5	
6	Malta	10	1	2	7	9	30	−21	5	

Source: FIFA, UEFA
Rules for classification: Tiebreakers
Notes:

24 March 2021 2022 FIFA World Cup qualification	Cyprus	0–0	Slovakia	Nicosia, Cyprus
20:45		Report		Stadium: GSP Stadium; Attendance: 0 Referee: Aleksandar Stavrev (North Macedonia

27 March 2021 2022 FIFA World Cup qualification	Slovakia	2–2	Malta	Trnava, Slovakia
20:45	David Strelec 49'; Milan Škriniar 53'	Report	17' Luke Gambin; 20' Alexander Satariano	Stadium: Štadión Antona Malatinského; Attendance: 0 Referee: Harald Lechner (Austria)

30 March 2021 2022 FIFA World Cup qualification	Slovakia	2–1	Russia	Trnava, Slovakia
20:45	Milan Škriniar 38'; Róbert Mak 74'	Report	Mário Fernandes 71'	Stadium: Štadión Antona Malatinského; Attendance: 0 Referee: Carlos del Cerro Grande (Spain)

=== UEFA Euro 2020 ===
Pos	Team	Pld	W	D	L	GF	GA	GD	Pts	Qualification
1	Sweden	3	2	1	0	4	2	+2	7	Advance to knockout stage
2	Spain (H)	3	1	2	0	6	1	+5	5	Advance to knockout stage
3	Slovakia	3	1	0	2	2	7	−5	3	
4	Poland	3	0	1	2	4	6	−2	1	

Source: UEFA
Rules for classification: Group stage tiebreakers
(H) Hosts

14 June 2021 UEFA Euro 2020	Poland	1–2	Slovakia	Saint Petersburg, Russia
18:00	Karol Linetty 46'; Grzegorz Krychowiak (red card) 62'	Report	18' (o.g.) Wojciech Szczęsny; 69' Milan Škriniar	Stadium: Krestovsky Stadium; Attendance: 12,862; Referee: Ovidiu Hațegan (Romania)

18 June 2021 UEFA Euro 2020	Sweden	1–0	Slovakia	Saint Petersburg, Russia
15:00	Emil Forsberg 77' (pen.)	Report		Stadium: Krestovsky Stadium; Attendance: 11,525; Referee: Daniel Siebert (Germany)

23 June 2021 UEFA Euro 2020	Slovakia	0–5	Spain	Seville, Spain
18:00		Report	30' (o.g.) Martin Dúbravka; 45+3' Aymeric Laporte; 56' Pablo Sarabia; 67' Ferran Torres; 71' (o.g.) Juraj Kucka	Stadium: Estadio de La Cartuja; Attendance: 11,204; Referee: Björn Kuipers (Netherlands)

=== International Friendly ===
1 June 2021 International Friendly	Slovakia	1–1	Bulgaria	Ried im Innkreis, Austria
18:00	László Bénes 27'	Report	Atanas Iliev 9'	Stadium: Keine Sorgen Arena; Attendance: 0 Referee: Walter Altmann (Austria)

6 June 2021 International Friendly	Austria	0–0	Slovakia	Vienna, Austria
20:45		Report		Stadium: Ernst Happel Stadion; Attendance: 3,000; Referee: Urs Schnyder (Switzerland)

== Slovakia women's national football team ==
=== 2020 Cyprus Women's Cup ===
Pos	Team	Pld	W	D	L	GF	GA	GD	Pts	PPG
1	Croatia	2	1	1	0	4	3	+1	4	2.00
2	Finland	3	1	1	1	7	6	+1	4	1.33
3	Mexico	3	0	3	0	3	3	0	3	1.00
4	Czech Republic	2	0	2	0	1	1	0	2	1.00
5	Slovakia	2	0	1	1	4	6	−2	1	0.50

Source: Cypruswomenscup

8 March 2020 Cyprus Women's Cup	Slovakia	2–2	Mexico	Larnaca, Cyprus
18:00	Hmírová 11'; Mikolajová 29'	Report	Munoz 47'; López 90+3'	Stadium: AEK Arena

11 March 2020 Cyprus Women's Cup	Slovakia	2–4	Finland	Larnaca, Cyprus
15:30	Westerlund 11' (o.g.); Hmírová 90+1' (pen.)	Report	Öling 16'; Sällström 34'; Westerlund 75'; Collin 84'	Stadium: GSZ Stadium

=== UEFA Women's Euro 2022 qualifying ===
Pos	Team	Pld	W	D	L	GF	GA	GD	Pts	Qualification	Sweden	Iceland	Slovakia	Hungary	Latvia
1	Sweden	8	7	1	0	40	2	+38	22	Final tournament	—	2–0	7–0	8–0	7–0
2	Iceland	8	6	1	1	25	5	+20	19	Final tournament	1–1	—	1–0	4–1	9–0
3	Slovakia	8	3	1	4	7	19	−12	10		0–6	1–3	—	0–0	2–0
4	Hungary	8	2	1	5	11	20	−9	7		0–5	0–1	1–2	—	4–0
5	Latvia	8	0	0	8	2	39	−37	0		1–4	0–6	1–2	0–5	—

Source: UEFA

27 October 2020 Euro 2021 qualifying	Slovakia	2–0	Latvia	Senec
18:00	Hmírová 8' (pen.), 34' (pen.)	Report		Stadium: NTC Senec; Referee: Monika Mularczyk (Poland)

23 October 2020 Euro 2021 qualifying	Hungary	1–2	Slovakia	Illovszky Rudolf Stadion, Budapest
20:00	Pusztai 90+2'	Report	Hmírová 68'; Mikolajová 80'	Attendance: 600; Referee: Hristiyana Guteva (Belarus)

25 November 2020 Euro 2021 qualifying	Slovakia	1–3	Iceland	Senec
	Mikolajová 25'	Report	Þorvaldsdóttir 61'; Gunnarsdóttir 67' (pen.), 77' (pen.)	Stadium: NTC Senec; Referee: Eleni Antoniou (Greece)

30 November 2020 Euro 2021 qualifying	Slovakia	0–6	Sweden	Anton Malatinský Stadium, Trnava
		Report	Angeldal 22', 73'; Sembrant 34'; Rolfö 44'; Andersson 49'; Blomqvist 54'	Referee: Karoline Wacker (Germany)

=== International Friendly ===
18 February Friendly	Malta	0–4	Slovakia	Paola, Malta
15:00 UTC+1		Report	Vojteková 10'; Panáková 22'; Ondrušová 74'; Mikolajová 90+'	Stadium: Hibernians Stadium

23 February Friendly	Austria	1–0	Slovakia	Paola, Malta
18:30 UTC+1	Höbinger 14'	Report		Stadium: Hibernians Stadium; Referee: Alina Pesu (Romania)

10 April Friendly	Mexico	0–0	Slovakia	Vienna, Austria
14:00 UTC+1				Stadium: Wiener Neudorf Stadion

13 April Friendly	Slovenia	5–0	Slovakia	Čatež ob Savi, Slovenia
11:30 UTC+1	Prašnikar 30', 45'; Zver 44', 55', 69'			Stadium: Terme Čatež

== UEFA club's competitions ==
=== UEFA Champions League ===
==== First qualifying round ====
Team 1	Score	Team 2
KÍ (Faroe Islands)	3–0 (awd.) (Note: The first qualifying round match between KÍ and Slovan Bratislava, originally scheduled to be played on 19 August 2020, was postponed to 21 August 2020 due to one staff member from Slovan Bratislava testing positive for SARS-2 coronavirus and the whole team being put into quarantine by the Faroese authorities. On 21 August, the match could not be played due to one player from Slovan Bratislava testing positive for SARS-2 coronavirus and the whole second team being put into quarantine by the Faroese authorities. KÍ were subsequently awarded a technical 3–0 victory by UEFA according to the regulations related to COVID-19.)	(Slovakia) Slovan Bratislava

=== UEFA Europa League ===
==== First qualifying round ====
Team 1	Score	Team 2
FH (Iceland)	0–2	(Slovakia) DAC Dunajská Streda
The New Saints (Wales)	3–1 (a.e.t.)	(Slovakia) Žilina
Servette (Switzerland)	3–0	(Slovakia) Ružomberok

==== Second qualifying round ====
Team 1	Score	Team 2
KuPS (Finland)	1–1 (a.e.t.) (4–3 p)	(Slovakia) Slovan Bratislava
DAC Dunajská Streda (Slovakia)	5–3 (a.e.t.)	(Czech Republic) Jablonec

==== Third qualifying round ====
Team 1	Score	Team 2
LASK (Austria)	7–0	(Slovakia) DAC Dunajská Streda

=== UEFA Youth League ===
The 2019–20 Slovak U19 League was abandoned due to the COVID-19 pandemic in Slovakia. The top team of the league at the time of the abandonment, Žilina, were selected to play in the 2020–21 UEFA Youth League by the Slovak Football Association in the Domestic Champions Path. The UEFA Executive Committee has decided to cancel the 2020–21 UEFA Youth League due to the COVID-19 pandemic and its effects on the staging of competitions.

2–3 March 2021

K.R.C. Genk (Belgium)	Cancelled	(Slovakia) MŠK Žilina

=== UEFA Women's Champions League ===
==== Knockout phase ====
4 November 2020
14:00 (15:00 EET)

Gintra Universitetas (Lithuania)	4–0	(Slovakia) Slovan Bratislava
Kass 66'; Carchio 79'; Mucherera 85'; Corneil 90' (pen.)	Report

Savivaldybė Stadium, Šiauliai
Attendance: 151
Referee: Ifeoma Kulmala (Finland)

== Men's football ==
League	Promoted to league	Relegated from league	Expelled or Dissolved	Re-elected
Fortuna Liga	None	None	None	None
2. liga	None	None	MFK Ružomberok "B"	None
3. liga	Slávia TU Košice; MŠK Spišské Podhradie; OK Častkovce; TJ Imeľ	ŠK 1923 Gabčíkovo (Note: Relegated to 5. Liga)	FK Poprad "B"; OŠFK Šarišské Michaľany; Spartak Trnava "B"	None

=== Fortuna liga ===
Pos	Team	Pld	W	D	L	GF	GA	GD	Pts	Qualification
1	Slovan Bratislava	22	17	3	2	54	12	+42	54	Qualification for the championship group
2	DAC Dunajská Streda	22	13	5	4	48	28	+20	44	Qualification for the championship group
3	Žilina	22	11	4	7	49	33	+16	37	Qualification for the championship group
4	Spartak Trnava	22	11	2	9	32	29	+3	35	Qualification for the championship group
5	Zlaté Moravce	22	9	6	7	38	29	+9	33	Qualification for the championship group
6	Trenčín	22	7	7	8	30	38	−8	28	Qualification for the championship group
7	Ružomberok	22	5	8	9	31	37	−6	23	Qualification for the relegation group
8	Nitra	22	6	4	12	21	38	−17	22	Qualification for the relegation group
9	Zemplín Michalovce	22	5	7	10	22	42	−20	22	Qualification for the relegation group
10	Sereď	22	5	7	10	22	39	−17	22	Qualification for the relegation group
11	Senica	22	5	6	11	23	40	−17	21	Qualification for the relegation group
12	Pohronie	22	3	11	8	27	32	−5	20	Qualification for the relegation group

Source: Niké liga (in Slovak)
Rules for classification: 1) Points; 2) Head-to-head points; 3) Head-to-head goal difference; 4) Head-to-head away goals scored; 5) Play-off.

=== 2. liga ===
Pos	Team	Pld	W	D	L	GF	GA	GD	Pts	Promotion, qualification or relegation
1	Tatran Liptovský Mikuláš (C, P)	28	18	6	4	55	26	+29	60	Promotion to Fortuna liga
2	Dukla Banská Bystrica	28	17	5	6	70	38	+32	56	Qualification to Promotion play-offs
3	Skalica	28	16	7	5	55	32	+23	55	
4	Železiarne Podbrezová	28	16	6	6	57	25	+32	54	
5	Košice	28	15	4	9	40	27	+13	49	
6	Šamorín	28	12	5	11	41	34	+7	41	
7	Púchov	28	11	5	12	40	45	−5	38	
8	Komárno	28	11	5	12	31	42	−11	38	
9	Petržalka	28	10	7	11	37	41	−4	37	
10	Slavoj Trebišov	28	9	8	11	47	48	−1	35	
11	Dubnica	28	8	9	11	28	37	−9	33	
12	Žilina B	28	9	6	13	56	47	+9	33	
13	Partizán Bardejov	28	6	10	12	27	41	−14	28	
14	Slovan Bratislava U21	28	7	0	21	32	70	−38	21	
15	Poprad (R)	28	3	1	24	25	88	−63	4 (Note: FK Poprad was punished by subtracting 6 points.)	Relegation to 3. Liga

Source: Futbalnet (in Slovak)
Rules for classification: 1) Points; 2) Head-to-head points; 3) Head-to-head goal difference; 4) Head-to-head away goals scored; 5) Play-off.
(C) Champions; (P) Promoted; (R) Relegated

=== Bratislava ===
Pos	Team	Pld	W	D	L	GF	GA	GD	Pts	Promotion or relegation
1	Rohožník	15	11	4	0	32	6	+26	37	Promotion to 2. Liga
2	Rača	15	10	1	4	37	19	+18	31	
3	Inter Bratislava	15	10	1	4	53	21	+32	31	
4	Rovinka	15	8	3	4	34	19	+15	27	
5	Malacky	15	8	3	4	28	14	+14	27	
6	Senec	15	8	1	6	20	27	−7	25	
7	Tomášov	15	7	1	7	20	35	−15	22	
8	Slovan Ivanka pri Dunaji	15	6	4	5	26	23	+3	22	
9	Pezinok	15	6	3	6	32	30	+2	21	
10	Slovan Most pri Bratislave	15	6	2	7	24	32	−8	20	
11	Bernolákovo	15	5	4	6	24	24	0	19	
12	Dunajská Lužná	15	3	5	7	18	28	−10	14	
13	Lokomotíva Devínska Nová Ves	15	3	3	9	13	38	−25	12	
14	Báhoň	15	2	5	8	17	27	−10	11	
15	Kalinkovo	15	3	1	11	22	38	−16	10	
16	Rusovce	15	2	3	10	15	34	−19	9	Relegation to 4. Liga

Updated to match(es) played on end of the season. Source: Soccerway
Rules for classification: 1) Points; 2) Head-to-head points; 3) Head-to-head goal difference; 4) Head-to-head away goals scored; 5) Play-off.

=== Západ (West) ===
Pos	Team	Pld	W	D	L	GF	GA	GD	Pts	Promotion or relegation
1	Spartak Myjava	15	10	3	2	27	11	+16	33	None promoted, because FC Nitra did not obtain license for 2. liga season.
2	Beluša	15	9	5	1	33	13	+20	32	
3	Dynamo Malženice	15	9	4	2	41	16	+25	31	
4	ViOn Zlaté Moravce-Vráble B	15	9	3	3	21	11	+10	30	
5	Považská Bystrica	15	8	5	2	36	14	+22	29	
6	Slovan Duslo Šaľa	15	8	1	6	26	16	+10	25	
7	Marcelová	15	7	2	6	22	23	−1	23	
8	Častkovce	15	7	2	6	20	19	+1	23	
9	Nové Mesto nad Váhom	15	6	2	7	17	20	−3	20	
10	Kalná nad Hronom	15	4	5	6	16	21	−5	17	
11	Imeľ	15	3	5	7	11	17	−6	14	
12	Crystal Lednické Rovne	15	4	2	9	15	35	−20	14	
13	FC Nitra B	15	3	3	9	24	35	−11	12	
14	Nové Zámky	15	3	2	10	13	40	−27	11	
15	Družstevník Veľké Ludince	15	2	4	9	9	27	−18	10	
16	Slovan Galanta	15	2	4	9	12	25	−13	10	Relegation to 4. Liga

Updated to match(es) played on end of the season. Source: Soccerway
Rules for classification: 1) Points; 2) Head-to-head points; 3) Head-to-head goal difference; 4) Head-to-head away goals scored; 5) Play-off.

=== Stred (Central) ===
Pos	Team	Pld	W	D	L	GF	GA	GD	Pts	Promotion or relegation
1	Námestovo	15	12	2	1	38	10	+28	38	Promotion to 2. Liga
2	Rakytovce	15	11	2	2	31	13	+18	35	
3	Tatran Oravské Veselé	15	10	3	2	28	10	+18	33	
4	Rimavská Sobota	15	9	1	5	32	22	+10	28	
5	Fomat Martin	15	8	2	5	28	18	+10	26	
6	Jednota Bánová	15	8	2	5	37	17	+20	26	
7	Tatran Krásno nad Kysucou	15	7	3	5	30	29	+1	24	
8	Prameň Kováčová	15	7	2	6	23	12	+11	23	
9	Baník Kalinovo	15	5	4	6	19	19	0	19	
10	Družstevník Liptovská Štiavnica	15	6	1	8	28	42	−14	19	
11	Fiľakovo	15	5	3	7	19	14	+5	18	
12	Novohrad Lučenec	15	4	4	7	25	42	−17	16	
13	Liptovský Hrádok	15	4	2	9	20	28	−8	14	
14	Nová Baňa-Žarnovica	15	3	2	10	15	41	−26	11	
15	Čadca	15	3	0	12	12	35	−23	9	
16	Lokomotíva Zvolen	15	1	1	13	10	43	−33	4	Relegation to 4. Liga

Updated to match(es) played on end of the season. Source: Soccerway
Rules for classification: 1) Points; 2) Head-to-head points; 3) Head-to-head goal difference; 4) Head-to-head away goals scored; 5) Play-off.

=== Východ (Eastern) ===
Pos	Team	Pld	W	D	L	GF	GA	GD	Pts	Promotion or relegation
1	Humenné	15	14	1	0	53	9	+44	43	Promotion to 2. Liga
2	Odeva Lipany	15	11	4	0	42	10	+32	37	
3	Tatran Prešov	15	10	1	4	42	17	+25	31	
4	Slávia TU Košice	15	10	1	4	39	23	+16	31	
5	Vranov nad Topľou	15	10	1	4	26	20	+6	31	
6	Mladosť Kalša	15	8	1	6	45	26	+19	25	
7	Tesla Stropkov	15	6	4	5	29	26	+3	22	
8	Družstevník Plavnica	15	6	3	6	22	25	−3	21	
9	Spišská Nová Ves	15	6	3	6	23	23	0	21	
10	Snina	15	5	2	8	23	23	0	17	
11	Spišské Podhradie	15	4	2	9	23	38	−15	14	
12	Sobrance - Sobranecko	15	4	1	10	15	39	−24	13	
13	Slovan Giraltovce	15	4	1	10	11	30	−19	13	
14	POKROK SEZ Krompachy	15	3	3	9	18	42	−24	12	
15	Svidník	15	2	2	11	10	46	−36	8	
16	Milénium Bardejovská Nová Ves	15	2	0	13	15	39	−24	6	Relegation to 4. Liga

Updated to match(es) played on end of the season. Source: Soccerway
Rules for classification: 1) Points; 2) Head-to-head points; 3) Head-to-head goal difference; 4) Head-to-head away goals scored; 5) Play-off.

=== Slovak Cup ===
==== Final ====
19 May 2021
18:00 (UTC+2)

Žilina	1–2 (a.e.t.)	Slovan Bratislava
Kiwior 30'	Report	Henty 61'; Weiss 105+4' (pen.)

Tehelné pole, Bratislava
Attendance: 0 (Note: The final was played behind closed doors due to the COVID-19 pandemic in Slovakia.)
Referee: Peter Kráľovič

=== Czechoslovak Supercup ===
The 2020 Supercup was canceled due to the COVID-19 outbreak.

AC Sparta Prague	Cancelled	ŠK Slovan Bratislava

== Women's football ==
=== Slovak Women's First League ===
The season was abandoned due COVID-19 pandemic in Slovakia.

Pos	Team	Pld	W	D	L	GF	GA	GD	Pts	Qualification
1	Slovan Bratislava	7	6	0	1	50	3	+47	18	Qualification for the Champions League first round
2	Partizán Bardejov	5	5	0	0	24	0	+24	15	
3	Spartak Myjava	6	4	0	2	36	5	+31	12	
4	FC Nitra	5	4	0	1	18	15	+3	12	
5	AS Trenčín	7	4	0	3	20	27	−7	12	
6	FC Petržalka	6	3	0	3	19	16	+3	9	
7	MŠK Žilina	6	2	0	4	7	24	−17	6	
8	Spartak Trnava	6	1	1	4	7	21	−14	4	
9	Dukla Banská Bystrica	6	0	1	5	2	39	−37	1	
10	FK Poprad	6	0	0	6	1	34	−33	0	

Updated to match(es) played on unknown. Source: Soccerway, Sportnet.sme.sk
Rules for classification: 1) Points; 2) Head-to-head points; 3) Head-to-head goal difference; 4) Head-to-head away goals scored; 5) Play-off.

=== Slovak Women's Cup ===
The competition was abandoned due COVID-19 pandemic in Slovakia.

==== First round ====
Team 1	Score	Team 2
FK Dubrávka	0–2	FC Petržalka
ViOn Zlaté Moravce	0–7	MFK Ružomberok
KFC Komárno	1–3	GFC Topoľčany
FC Košice	5–0	FC TJ Oravský Podzámok
FC Union Nové Zámky	4–3	ŠK 2011

==== Bracket ====
Second round
MFK Ružomberok	6
FK Poprad	0
GFC Topoľčany	2
Dukla Banská Bystrica	1
AS Trenčín	3
Spartak Trnava	1
FC Košice	0
MŠK Žilina	4
FC Union Nové Zámky	7
FC Petržalka	1

Quarter-finals
MFK Ružomberok
Slovan Bratislava
GFC Topolčany
Partizán Bardejov
AS Trenčín
MŠK Žilina
FC Union Nové Zámky
Spartak Myjava

Semi-finals

Final

== Managerial changes ==
This is a list of changes of managers within Slovakia league football:

Team	Outgoing manager	Manner of departure	Date of departure	Position in table	Incoming manager	Date of appointment

== Deaths ==
- Jozef Vengloš

== See also ==
- 2020–21 Slovak Cup
- 2020–21 2. Liga (Slovakia)
- List of Slovak football transfers summer 2020
- List of Slovak football transfers winter 2020–21
- List of foreign Slovak First League players
