= UEFA Women's Euro 2022 Group B =

Football tournament group stage

Group B of UEFA Women's Euro 2022 was played from 8 to 16 July 2022. The pool was made up of Germany, Denmark, Spain and Finland.

== Teams ==
Draw position	Team	Pot	Method of qualification	Date of qualification	Finals appearance	Last appearance	Previous best performance	UEFA Rankings October 2021 (Note: The UEFA rankings of October 2021 were used for seeding for the final draw.)	FIFA Rankings June 2022
B1	Germany	1	Group I winner	23 October 2020	11th	2017	Winners (1989, 1991, 1995, 1997, 2001, 2005, 2009, 2013)	2	5
B2	Denmark	3	Group B winner	27 October 2020	10th	2017	Runners-up (2017)	9	15
B3	Spain	2	Group D winner	18 February 2021	4th	2017	Semi-finals (1997)	6	7
B4	Finland	4	Group E winner	13 April 2021	4th	2013	Semi-finals (2005)	16	29

== Standings ==
Pos	Team	Pld	W	D	L	GF	GA	GD	Pts	Qualification
1	Germany	3	3	0	0	9	0	+9	9	Advance to knockout stage
2	Spain	3	2	0	1	5	3	+2	6	Advance to knockout stage
3	Denmark	3	1	0	2	1	5	−4	3	
4	Finland	3	0	0	3	1	8	−7	0	

Source: UEFA
Rules for classification: Group stage tiebreakers

== Matches ==
=== Spain vs Finland ===
8 July 2022
17:00

Spain	4–1	Finland
Paredes 26'; Bonmatí 41'; L. García 75'; Caldentey 90+5' (pen.)	Report	Sällström 1'

Stadium MK, Milton Keynes
Attendance: 16,819
Referee: Kateryna Monzul (Ukraine)

Spain	Finland

GK	13	Sandra Paños
RB	2	Ona Batlle
CB	4	Irene Paredes (c)	(yellow card) 54'
CB	16	María Pilar León
LB	15	Leila Ouahabi		(substituted off) 61'
DM	12	Patricia Guijarro
CM	6	Aitana Bonmatí		(substituted off) 79'
CM	7	Irene Guerrero		(substituted off) 61'
RW	17	Lucía García		(substituted off) 86'
LW	8	Mariona Caldentey
CF	9	Esther González		(substituted off) 79'
Substitutions:
DF	3	Laia Aleixandri		(substituted in) 61'
MF	21	Sheila García		(substituted in) 61'
FW	10	Athenea del Castillo		(substituted in) 79'
MF	11	Marta Cardona		(substituted in) 79'
FW	22	Clàudia Pina		(substituted in) 86'
Manager:
Jorge Vilda

GK	23	Tinja-Riikka Korpela (c)
RB	3	Tuija Hyyrynen		(substituted off) 66'
CB	16	Anna Westerlund
CB	2	Elli Pikkujämsä
LB	5	Emma Koivisto
RM	7	Adelina Engman		(substituted off) 46'
CM	10	Emmi Alanen	(yellow card) 80'
CM	20	Eveliina Summanen		(substituted off) 85'
LM	4	Ria Öling		(substituted off) 87'
CF	18	Linda Sällström
CF	17	Sanni Franssi		(substituted off) 85'
Substitutions:
MF	19	Essi Sainio		(substituted in) 46'
DF	15	Natalia Kuikka		(substituted in) 66'
MF	8	Olga Ahtinen		(substituted in) 85'
MF	13	Jenny Danielsson		(substituted in) 85'
FW	21	Amanda Rantanen		(substituted in) 87'
Manager:
(Sweden) Anna Signeul

Player of the Match:
Aitana Bonmatí (Spain)

Assistant referees:
Maryna Striletska (Ukraine)
Paulina Baranowska (Poland)
Fourth official:
Ivana Projkovska (North Macedonia)
Video assistant referee:
Paolo Valeri (Italy)
Assistant video assistant referee:
Maurizio Mariani (Italy)

=== Germany vs Denmark ===
8 July 2022
20:00

Germany	4–0	Denmark
Magull 21'; Schüller 57'; Lattwein 78'; Popp 86'	Report

Brentford Community Stadium, London
Attendance: 15,736
Referee: Esther Staubli (Switzerland)

Germany	Denmark

GK	1	Merle Frohms
RB	15	Giulia Gwinn
CB	3	Kathrin Hendrich
CB	5	Marina Hegering	(yellow card) 90+4'
LB	17	Felicitas Rauch	(yellow card) 73'
CM	6	Lena Oberdorf	(yellow card) 40'	(substituted off) 84'
CM	13	Sara Däbritz		(substituted off) 61'
CM	20	Lina Magull		(substituted off) 69'
RF	9	Svenja Huth (c)
CF	7	Lea Schüller		(substituted off) 61'
LF	19	Klara Bühl		(substituted off) 61'
Substitutions:
FW	11	Alexandra Popp		(substituted in) 61'
MF	4	Lena Lattwein		(substituted in) 61'
MF	22	Jule Brand		(substituted in) 61'
MF	16	Linda Dallmann		(substituted in) 69'
MF	8	Sydney Lohmann		(substituted in) 84'
Manager:
Martina Voss-Tecklenburg

GK	1	Lene Christensen
CB	4	Rikke Sevecke
CB	3	Stine Ballisager Pedersen
CB	11	Katrine Veje
RM	19	Janni Thomsen		(substituted off) 83'
CM	7	Sanne Troelsgaard Nielsen		(substituted off) 55'
CM	13	Sofie Junge Pedersen
LM	23	Sofie Svava		(substituted off) 70'
RF	17	Rikke Madsen		(substituted off) 55'
CF	20	Signe Bruun		(substituted off) 55'
LF	10	Pernille Harder (c)
Substitutions:
MF	15	Kathrine Møller Kühl	(yellow card) 78' (yellow-red card) 90+5'	(substituted in) 55'
FW	9	Nadia Nadim		(substituted in) 55'
FW	21	Mille Gejl		(substituted in) 55'
DF	5	Simone Boye Sørensen		(substituted in) 70'
FW	12	Stine Larsen	(yellow card) 90+2'	(substituted in) 83'
Manager:
Lars Søndergaard

Player of the Match:
Lina Magull (Germany)

Assistant referees:
Susanne Küng (Switzerland)
Sara Telek (Austria)
Fourth official:
Iuliana Demetrescu (Romania)
Video assistant referee:
Benoît Millot (France)
Assistant video assistant referee:
Maïka Vanderstichel (France)

=== Denmark vs Finland ===
12 July 2022
17:00

Denmark	1–0	Finland
Harder 72'	Report

Stadium MK, Milton Keynes
Attendance: 11,615
Referee: Iuliana Demetrescu (Romania)

Denmark	Finland

GK	1	Lene Christensen
CB	4	Rikke Sevecke	(yellow card) 66'
CB	3	Stine Ballisager Pedersen
CB	11	Katrine Veje
RM	2	Sara Thrige		(substituted off) 56'
CM	7	Sanne Troelsgaard Nielsen		(substituted off) 64'
CM	13	Sofie Junge Pedersen
LM	19	Janni Thomsen
RF	9	Nadia Nadim		(substituted off) 56'
CF	20	Signe Bruun		(substituted off) 64'
LF	10	Pernille Harder (c)		(substituted off) 87'
Substitutions:
MF	14	Sofie Bredgaard		(substituted in) 56'
MF	23	Sofie Svava		(substituted in) 56'
MF	6	Karen Holmgaard		(substituted in) 64'
FW	12	Stine Larsen		(substituted in) 64'
DF	5	Simone Boye Sørensen		(substituted in) 87'
Manager:
Lars Søndergaard

GK	23	Tinja-Riikka Korpela (c)
RB	5	Emma Koivisto
CB	16	Anna Westerlund	(substituted off) 90'
CB	15	Natalia Kuikka
LB	2	Elli Pikkujämsä
RM	19	Essi Sainio
CM	10	Emmi Alanen
CM	20	Eveliina Summanen
LM	4	Ria Öling
CF	18	Linda Sällström	(substituted off) 76'
CF	17	Sanni Franssi
Substitutions:
MF	8	Olga Ahtinen	(substituted in) 76'
MF	13	Jenny Danielsson	(substituted in) 90'
Manager:
(Sweden) Anna Signeul

Player of the Match:
Pernille Harder (Denmark)

Assistant referees:
Petruța Iugulescu (Romania)
Anita Vad (Hungary)
Fourth official:
Cheryl Foster (Wales)
Video assistant referee:
Pol van Boekel (Netherlands)
Assistant video assistant referee:
Dennis Higler (Netherlands)

=== Germany vs Spain ===
12 July 2022
20:00

Germany	2–0	Spain
Bühl 3'; Popp 37'	Report

Brentford Community Stadium, London
Attendance: 16,037
Referee: Stéphanie Frappart (France)

Germany	Spain

GK	1	Merle Frohms
RB	15	Giulia Gwinn
CB	3	Kathrin Hendrich
CB	5	Marina Hegering
LB	17	Felicitas Rauch	(yellow card) 27'	(substituted off) 62'
CM	6	Lena Oberdorf	(yellow card) 86'
CM	13	Sara Däbritz		(substituted off) 72'
CM	20	Lina Magull		(substituted off) 46'
RF	9	Svenja Huth
CF	11	Alexandra Popp (c)		(substituted off) 62'
LF	19	Klara Bühl		(substituted off) 87'
Substitutions:
MF	4	Lena Lattwein		(substituted in) 46'
DF	2	Sophia Kleinherne		(substituted in) 62'
FW	18	Tabea Waßmuth		(substituted in) 62'
MF	16	Linda Dallmann		(substituted in) 72'
MF	22	Jule Brand		(substituted in) 87'
Manager:
Martina Voss-Tecklenburg

GK	13	Sandra Paños
RB	2	Ona Batlle
CB	4	Irene Paredes (c)
CB	16	María Pilar León
LB	15	Leila Ouahabi
DM	3	Laia Aleixandri	(substituted off) 70'
CM	6	Aitana Bonmatí
CM	12	Patricia Guijarro
RW	21	Sheila García	(substituted off) 70'
LW	8	Mariona Caldentey	(substituted off) 84'
CF	17	Lucía García	(substituted off) 62'
Substitutions:
FW	22	Clàudia Pina	(substituted in) 62'
MF	11	Marta Cardona	(substituted in) 70'
FW	10	Athenea del Castillo	(substituted in) 70'
MF	7	Irene Guerrero	(substituted in) 84'
Manager:
Jorge Vilda

Player of the Match:
Marina Hegering (Germany)

Assistant referees:
Élodie Coppola (France)
Manuela Nicolosi (France)
Fourth official:
Ivana Projkovska (North Macedonia)
Video assistant referee:
Benoît Millot (France)
Assistant video assistant referee:
Maïka Vanderstichel (France)

=== Finland vs Germany ===
16 July 2022
20:00

Finland	0–3	Germany
	Report	Kleinherne 40'; Popp 48'; Anyomi 63'

Stadium MK, Milton Keynes
Attendance: 20,721
Referee: Emikar Calderas (Venezuela)

Finland	Germany

GK	1	Katriina Talaslahti
RB	11	Nora Heroum
CB	2	Elli Pikkujämsä
CB	15	Natalia Kuikka
LB	5	Emma Koivisto		(substituted off) 46'
RM	7	Adelina Engman		(substituted off) 71'
CM	10	Emmi Alanen (c)
CM	20	Eveliina Summanen	(yellow card) 65'	(substituted off) 65'
LM	14	Heidi Kollanen		(substituted off) 65'
CF	18	Linda Sällström		(substituted off) 81'
CF	9	Juliette Kemppi
Substitutions:
DF	6	Anna Auvinen		(substituted in) 46'
MF	4	Ria Öling		(substituted in) 65'
MF	19	Essi Sainio		(substituted in) 65'
MF	8	Olga Ahtinen		(substituted in) 71'
FW	21	Amanda Rantanen		(substituted in) 81'
Manager:
(Sweden) Anna Signeul

GK	1	Merle Frohms
RB	15	Giulia Gwinn	(substituted off) 46'
CB	23	Sara Doorsoun
CB	5	Marina Hegering	(substituted off) 46'
LB	2	Sophia Kleinherne
CM	13	Sara Däbritz
CM	4	Lena Lattwein
CM	16	Linda Dallmann	(substituted off) 76'
RF	9	Svenja Huth	(substituted off) 64'
CF	11	Alexandra Popp (c)
LF	19	Klara Bühl	(substituted off) 64'
Substitutions:
DF	3	Kathrin Hendrich	(substituted in) 46'
FW	14	Nicole Anyomi	(substituted in) 46'
FW	18	Tabea Waßmuth	(substituted in) 64'
MF	22	Jule Brand	(substituted in) 64'
FW	10	Laura Freigang	(substituted in) 76'
Manager:
Martina Voss-Tecklenburg

Player of the Match:
Linda Dallmann (Germany)

Assistant referees:
Migdalia Rodríguez Chirino (Venezuela)
Mary Blanco Bolívar (Colombia)
Fourth official:
Marta Huerta de Aza (Spain)
Video assistant referee:
Tiago Martins (Portugal)
Assistant video assistant referee:
Luís Godinho (Portugal)

=== Denmark vs Spain ===
16 July 2022
20:00

Denmark	0–1	Spain
	Report	Cardona 90'

Brentford Community Stadium, London
Attendance: 16,041
Referee: Rebecca Welch (England)

Denmark	Spain

GK	1	Lene Christensen
CB	3	Stine Ballisager Pedersen
CB	5	Simone Boye Sørensen
CB	4	Rikke Sevecke
RM	19	Janni Thomsen		(substituted off) 73'
CM	6	Karen Holmgaard
CM	13	Sofie Junge Pedersen
LM	11	Katrine Veje		(substituted off) 80'
RF	17	Rikke Madsen		(substituted off) 73'
CF	10	Pernille Harder (c)
LF	15	Kathrine Møller Kühl		(substituted off) 58'
Substitutions:
MF	7	Sanne Troelsgaard Nielsen		(substituted in) 58'
FW	9	Nadia Nadim		(substituted in) 73'
FW	12	Stine Larsen	(yellow card) 89'	(substituted in) 73'
MF	8	Sara Holmgaard		(substituted in) 80'
Manager:
Lars Søndergaard			(yellow card) 90+1'

GK	13	Sandra Paños
RB	2	Ona Batlle
CB	4	Irene Paredes (c)
CB	16	María Pilar León
LB	15	Leila Ouahabi	(yellow card) 30'	(substituted off) 46'
DM	12	Patricia Guijarro
CM	6	Aitana Bonmatí
CM	8	Mariona Caldentey
RF	21	Sheila García		(substituted off) 46'
CF	17	Lucía García		(substituted off) 46'
LF	10	Athenea del Castillo		(substituted off) 80'
Substitutions:
FW	9	Esther González		(substituted in) 46'
DF	19	Olga Carmona		(substituted in) 46'
FW	11	Marta Cardona		(substituted in) 46'
DF	3	Laia Aleixandri		(substituted in) 80'
Manager:
Jorge Vilda

Player of the Match:
Aitana Bonmatí (Spain)

Assistant referees:
Sian Massey-Ellis (England)
Lisa Rashid (England)
Fourth official:
Ivana Martinčić (Croatia)
Video assistant referee:
Pol van Boekel (Netherlands)
Assistant video assistant referee:
Dennis Higler (Netherlands)

== Discipline ==
Fair play points will be used as tiebreakers in the group if the overall and head-to-head records of teams were tied. These are calculated based on yellow and red cards received in all group matches as follows:

- first yellow card: minus 1 point;
- indirect red card (second yellow card): minus 3 points;
- direct red card: minus 4 points;
- yellow card and direct red card: minus 5 points;

Team	Match 1				Match 2				Match 3				Points
Team	Booked	(yellow card) (yellow-red card)	Sent off (straight red)	(yellow card) (red card)	Booked	(yellow card) (yellow-red card)	Sent off (straight red)	(yellow card) (red card)	Booked	(yellow card) (yellow-red card)	Sent off (straight red)	(yellow card) (red card)	Points
Finland	1								1				−2
Spain	1								1				−2
Germany	3				2								−5
Denmark	1	1			1				1				−6
