= Kristina Nevrkla =

Croatian footballer

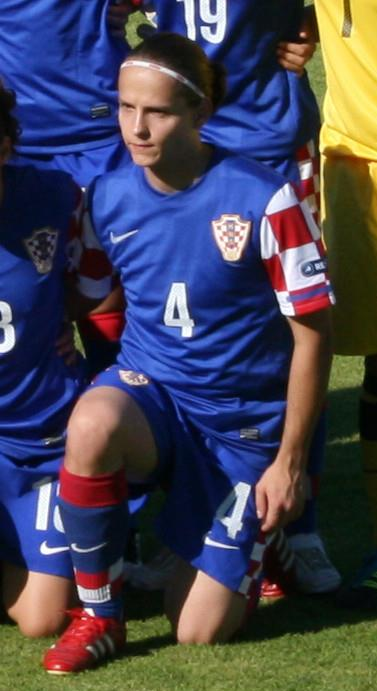
- Nevrkla in 2012

Personal information
- Full name: Kristina Nevrkla
- Date of birth: 5 July 1990 (age 36)
- Place of birth: Zagreb, Croatia, SFR Yugoslavia
- Position: Defender

Team information
- Current team: Osijek
- Number: 7

Senior career*
Years	Team	Apps	(Gls)
- Dinamo Maksimir
2011–	Osijek		

International career^{‡}
2008–	Croatia	109	(5)
- * Club domestic league appearances and goals ‡ National team caps and goals as of 7 March 2026

Kristina Nevrkla (born 5 July 1990) is a Croatian football defender currently playing in the Croatian 1st Division for ŽNK Osijek, with whom she has also played the Champions League. She previously played for Dinamo Maksimir.

She is a member of the Croatian national team.

== International goals ==
No.	Date	Venue	Opponent	Score	Result	Competition
1.	16 February 2023	GSZ Stadium, Larnaca, Cyprus	Finland	1–1	1–4	2023 Cyprus Women's Cup
2.	19 February 2023	AEK Arena, Larnaca, Cyprus	Romania	1–0	2–0	2023 Cyprus Women's Cup

== See also ==
- List of women's footballers with 100 or more international caps
