= 2024 Pinatar Cup =

Tournament details
- Host country: Spain
- Dates: 24–27 February
- Teams: 4 (from 2 confederations)

Final positions
- Champions: Finland (1st title)
- Runners-up: Scotland
- Third place: Slovenia
- Fourth place: Philippines

Tournament statistics
- Matches played: 4
- Goals scored: 6 (1.5 per match)
- Attendance: 530 (133 per match)
- Top scorer(s): (Scotland) Martha Thomas (3 goals)

The 2024 Pinatar Cup was the fourth edition of the Pinatar Cup, an invitational women's football tournament held in Spain from 24 to 27 February 2024.

== Format ==
The four invited teams played in a four-game format that will consist of semifinals, a third place, and a finals game.

== Teams ==
Team	FIFA Ranking (December 2023)
Scotland	25
Finland	27
Philippines	NR
Slovenia	44

== Bracket ==
Semi-finals
24 February
Philippines	0
Scotland	2
24 February
Slovenia	0
Finland	1

Final
27 February
Scotland	1 (4)
Finland (p)	1 (5)
Third place
27 February
Philippines	0
Slovenia	1

== Results ==
All times are local. (UTC−5)

=== Semifinals ===
24 February 2024
14:05

Philippines	0–2	Scotland
	Report	Thomas 22', 36'

Pinatar Arena, San Pedro del Pinatar
Attendance: 200
Referee: Jana Adámková (Czech Republic)

24 February 2024
19:30

Slovenia	0–1	Finland
	Report	Rantala 18'

Pinatar Arena, San Pedro del Pinatar
Attendance: 100
Referee: Katalin Sipos (Hungary)

=== Third place game ===
27 February 2024
19:30

Philippines	0–1	Slovenia
	Report	Golob 5'

Pinatar Arena, San Pedro del Pinatar
Attendance: 30
Referee: Katalin Sipos (Hungary)

=== Final ===
27 February 2024
14:05

Scotland	1–1	Finland
Thomas 75'	Report	Sevenius 21'
Penalties
Corsie (penalty scored); Evans (penalty scored); Thomas (penalty scored); Brown (penalty scored); Cuthbert (penalty missed); Docherty (penalty missed)	4–5	(penalty scored) Kuikka; (penalty scored) Nyström; (penalty scored) Ahtinen; (penalty missed) Kollanen; (penalty scored) Sällström; (penalty scored) Franssi

Pinatar Arena, San Pedro del Pinatar
Attendance: 200
Referee: Jana Adámková (Czech Republic)

== Goalscorers ==
There were 6 goals scored in 4 matches, for an average of 1.5 goals per match.

3 goals

- (Scotland) Martha Thomas

1 goal

- (Slovenia) Lana Golob
- (Finland) Jutta Rantala
- (Finland) Oona Sevenius

== See also ==
- 2024 SheBelieves Cup
- 2024 Turkish Women's Cup
