= Jutta Rantala =

Finnish footballer (born 1999)

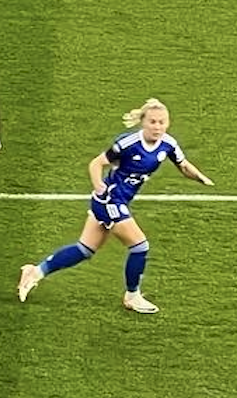
- Rantala playing for Leicester City in 2023

Personal information
- Full name: Jutta Kaarina Rebekka Rantala
- Date of birth: 10 November 1999 (age 27)
- Place of birth: Köyliö, Finland
- Height: 1.60 m (5 ft 3 in)
- Position: Forward

Team information
- Current team: Everton
- Number: 15

Youth career
- –2013: Euran Pallo
- 2014: NiceFutis

Senior career*
Years	Team	Apps	(Gls)
2014–2015	NiceFutis	40	(10)
2016–2017	TPS	45	(26)
2018	Honka	23	(6)
2019	HJK	22	(22)
2020–2021	Kristianstads	43	(9)
2022–2023	Vittsjö GIK	43	(19)
2023–2026	Leicester City	25	(7)
2026–	Everton	0	(0)

International career^{‡}
2020–	Finland	30	(10)
- * Club domestic league appearances and goals as of 17:43, 13 October 2024 (UTC) ‡ National team caps and goals as of 3 December 2024

Jutta Kaarina Rebekka Rantala (Finnish: [ˈjutːɑ ˈrɑntɑlɑ]; born 10 November 1999) is a Finnish professional footballer who plays as a forward for Women's Super League club Everton and the Finland national team.

== Club career ==
Rantala debuted in the Finnish women's premier division Naisten Liiga at the age of 14.

On 5 November 2015, Rantala was announced at TPS.

On 11 November 2017, Rantala was announced at FC Honka.

On her league debut for HJK, Rantala scored 4 goals against ONS on 23 March 2019. In 2019, she was the league top scorer with 22 goals and was nominated as the Player of the Year. In December 2019, Rantala was signed by the Swedish side Kristianstads DFF on a one-year contract.

In December 2021, Rantala joined Vittsjö GIK. On 21 October 2022, she signed a new contract with Vittsjö GIK for the 2023 season.

In August 2023, Rantala joined Leicester City in the Women's Super League, signing a two-year contract. She scored two goals on her league debut against Bristol City on 1 October 2023, scoring in the 49th and 83rd minute, winning the Player of the Match award. After her first season with Leicester City, she won the Player of the Season award. In October 2024, she suffered a knee injury.

On 22 July 2026, Rantala was announced at Everton.

== International career ==
Rantala was called up to the 2020 Cyprus Women's Cup squad. She scored on her national team debut in the 2020 Cyprus Cup against Croatia, scoring in the 5th minute.

Rantala was called up to the UEFA Women's Euro 2022 squad.

Rantala was initially not called up to the Finland squad that won the 2023 Cyprus Women's Cup for the first time. She was later called up to replace Tuija Hyyrynen, who had withdrawn from the squad due to injury.

Rantala was part of the Finland squad that won the 2024 Pinatar Cup for the first time.

On 19 June 2025, Rantala was called up to the Finland squad for the UEFA Women's Euro 2025.

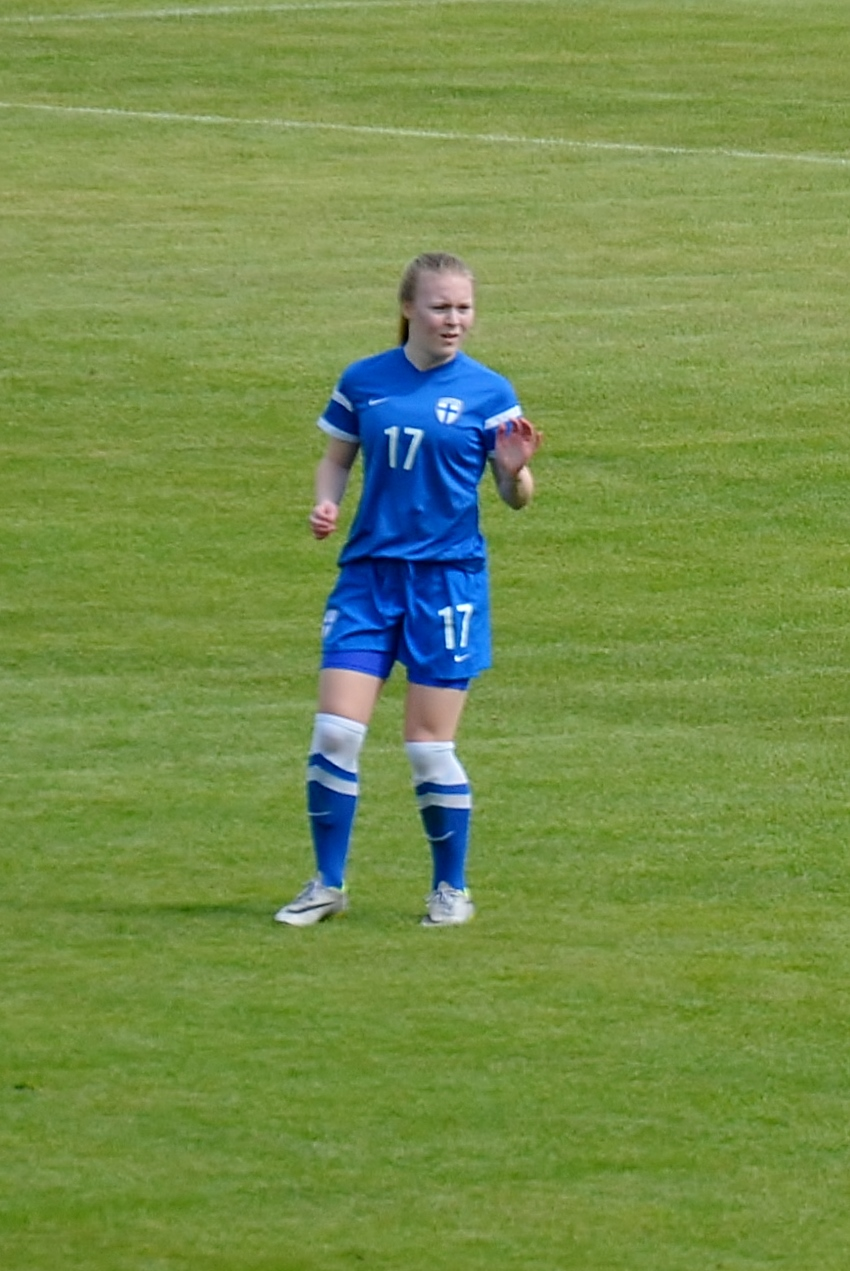
Rantala playing for Finland U17 in 2015

== Career statistics ==
=== Club ===
As of 3 December 2025

Appearances and goals by club, season and competition
Club	Season	League			Cup (Note: Includes Finnish Women's Cup, Svenska Cupen (women) and Women's FA Cup)		League cup (Note: Includes FA Women's League Cup)		Europe		Total	
Club	Season	Division	Apps	Goals	Apps	Goals	Apps	Goals	Apps	Goals	Apps	Goals
Nice Futis	2014	Naisten Liiga	18	3	–		–		–		18	3
Nice Futis	2015	Naisten Liiga	22	7	–		–		–		22	7
Nice Futis	Total		40	10	0	0	0	0	0	0	40	10
TPS	2016	Naisten Liiga	23	12	4	9	–		–		27	21
TPS	2017	Naisten Liiga	22	14	2	2	–		–		24	16
TPS	Total		45	26	6	11	0	0	0	0	51	37
Honka	2018	Naisten Liiga	23	6	1	2	–		5 (Note: Appearances in UEFA Women's Champions League)	2	29	10
HJK	2019	Naisten Liiga	22	22	6	4	–		–		28	26
Kristianstad	2020	Damallsvenskan	21	7	5	5	–		–		26	12
Kristianstad	2021	Damallsvenskan	22	2	1	1	–		2	0	25	3
Kristianstad	Total		43	9	6	6	0	0	2	0	51	15
Vittsjö GIK	2022	Damallsvenskan	26	11	4	3	–		–		30	14
Vittsjö GIK	2023	Damallsvenskan	17	8	0	0	–		–		17	8
Vittsjö GIK	Total		43	19	4	3	0	0	0	0	47	22
Leicester City	2023–24	Women's Super League	22	6	4	3	4	1	–		30	10
Leicester City	2024–25	Women's Super League	3	1	0	0	1	0	–		4	1
Leicester City	Total		25	7	4	3	5	1	0	0	34	11
Career total			241	99	27	29	5	1	7	2	280	131

=== International ===
As of 3 December 2024

Appearances and goals by national team and year
National team	Year	Apps	Goals
Finland	2020	1	1
Finland	2021	2	0
Finland	2022	7	0
Finland	2023	12	6
Finland	2024	8	3
Total		30	10

Scores and results list Finland's goal tally first, score column indicates score after each Rantala goal.

List of international goals scored by Jutta Rantala
No.	Date	Venue	Opponent	Score	Result	Competition
1.	8 March 2020	AEK Arena, Larnaca, Cyprus	Croatia	1–0	2–3	2020 Cyprus Women's Cup
2.	16 February 2023	GSZ Stadium, Larnaca, Cyprus	Croatia	4–1	4–1	2023 Cyprus Women's Cup
3.	22 February 2023	AEK Arena, Larnaca, Cyprus	Romania	1–0	4–0	2023 Cyprus Women's Cup
4.	10 April 2023	NTC Senec, Senec, Slovakia	Slovakia	2–0	2–0	Friendly
5.	14 July 2023	Laugardalsvöllur, Reykjavík, Iceland	Iceland	2–0	2–1	Friendly
6.	22 September 2023	Veritas Stadion, Turku, Finland	Slovakia	2–0	4–0	2023–24 UEFA Women's Nations League
7.	5 December 2023	Anton Malatinský Stadium, Trnava, Slovakia	Slovakia	2–2	2–2	2023–24 UEFA Women's Nations League
8.	24 February 2024	Pinatar Arena, San Pedro del Pinatar, Spain	Slovenia	1–0	1–0	2024 Pinatar Cup
9.	9 April 2024	Bolt Arena, Helsinki, Finland	Italy	1–1	2–1	UEFA Women's Euro 2025 qualifying
10.	4 June 2024	Tammelan Stadion, Tampere, Finland	Netherlands	1–1	1–1	UEFA Women's Euro 2025 qualifying

== Honours ==
HJK

- Naisten Liiga: 2019
- Finnish Women's Cup: 2019

Individual

- Leicester City Player of the Season: 2023–24
- Women's FA Cup: Team of the Season 2023–24
- Football Association of Finland: Finnish Footballer of the Year 2024
