= Ivana Rudelić =

German-born Croatian footballer

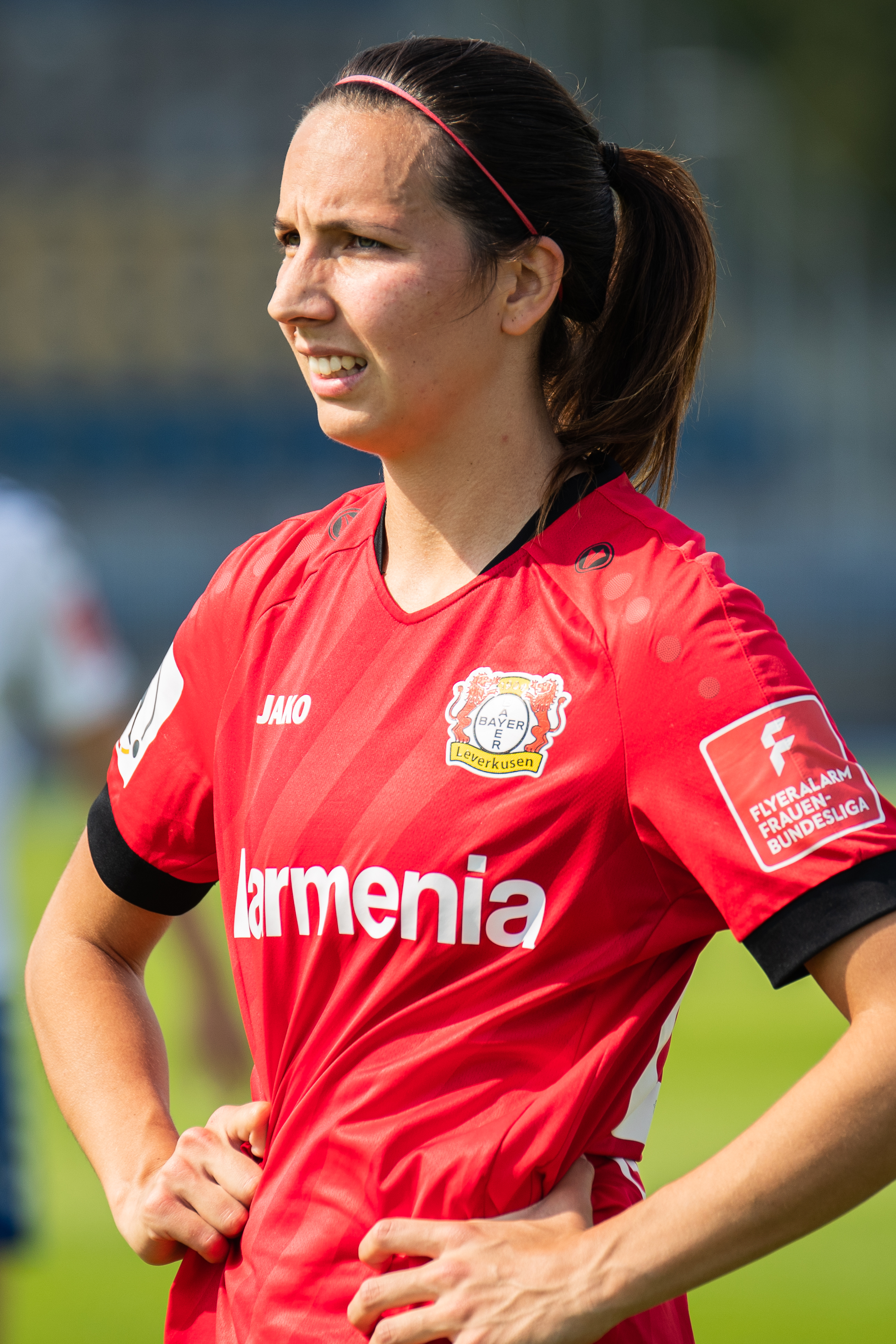

Personal information
- Date of birth: 25 January 1992 (age 34)
- Place of birth: Wangen im Allgäu, Germany
- Height: 1.76 m (5 ft 9 in)
- Position: Striker

Team information
- Current team: Basel
- Number: 9

Youth career
- TSV Tettnang

Senior career*
Years	Team	Apps	(Gls)
2008–2014	Bayern Munich	58	(7)
2010–2014	Bayern Munich II	5	(5)
2014–2018	USV Jena	61	(2)
2015–2018	USV Jena II	5	(1)
2018–2021	Bayer Leverkusen	49	(14)
2021–2023	Bayern Munich	11	(0)
2022–2023	Bayern Munich II	6	(2)
2023–	Basel	33	(14)

International career^{‡}
2008	Germany U16	4	(7)
2008	Germany U17	11	(9)
2011	Germany U19	6	(3)
2011–2012	Germany U20	4	(2)
2015–	Croatia	66	(24)
- * Club domestic league appearances and goals as of 24 March 2024 ‡ National team caps and goals as of 18 April 2026

Ivana Rudelić (born 25 January 1992) is a German-born Croatian footballer who plays as a striker for Swiss Women's Super League club FC Basel, as well as the Croatia women's national football team.

== Career ==
A former German youth international, Rudelić won the 2008 U-17 and 2011 U-19 European Championships, as well as a bronze medal in the 2008 U-17 World Cup.

== International career ==
List of international goals scored by Ivana Rudelić
No.	Date	Venue	Cap	Opponent	Score	Result	Competition
1	9 March 2015	Umag 4, Umag, Croatia	4	Northern Ireland	2–1	2–1	2015 Istria Cup
2	26 November 2016	Stadion Lučko, Lučko, Croatia	11	Slovakia	1–0	3–5	Friendly match
3	26 November 2016	Stadion Lučko, Lučko, Croatia	11	Slovakia	3–3	3–5	Friendly match
4	8 March 2017		15	Slovenia	3–0	3–0	Friendly match
5	27 July 2017	Stadion Lučko, Lučko, Croatia	17	Jordan	2–0	3–0	Friendly match
6	15 September 2017	Arena Lviv, Lviv, Ukraine	18	Ukraine	1–1	1–1	2019 FIFA Women's World Cup qualification
7	28 February 2018	Stadion Kazimira i Silvija, Biograd na Moru, Croatia	20	Montenegro	3–0	5–0	Friendly match
8	14 June 2019	Boyana, Sofia, Bulgaria	26	Bulgaria	2–0	6–0	Friendly match
9	14 June 2019	Boyana, Sofia, Bulgaria	26	Bulgaria	3–0	6–0	Friendly match
10	17 June 2019	Boyana, Sofia, Bulgaria	27	Bulgaria	2–1	3–1	Friendly match
11	8 March 2020	AEK Arena, Larnaca, Cyprus	31	Finland	1–2	3–2	2020 Cyprus Women's Cup
12	18 September 2020	Stadion ŠRC Zaprešić, Zaprešić, Croatia	32	Switzerland	1–0	1–1	UEFA Women's Euro 2022 qualifying
13	22 September 2020	Stadionul Mogoșoaia, Mogoșoaia, Romania	33	Romania	1–0	1–4	UEFA Women's Euro 2022 qualifying
14	19 February 2023	AEK Arena, Larnaca, Cyprus	39	Romania	2–0	2–0	2023 Cyprus Women's Cup
15	22 February 2023	AEK Arena, Larnaca, Cyprus	40	Hungary	1–0	1–0	2023 Cyprus Women's Cup
16	7 April 2023	Georgios Kamaras Stadium, Athens, Greece	41	Greece	1–1	1–1	Friendly match
17	22 September 2023	NK Varaždin Stadium, Varaždin, Croaita	43	Romania	1–1	2–1	2023–24 UEFA Women's Nations League
18	5 December 2023	Stadionul Arcul de Triumf, Bucharest, Romania	46	Romania	1–0	1–0	2023–24 UEFA Women's Nations League
19	31 May 2024	Zahir Pajaziti Stadium, Podujevo, Kosovo	50	Kosovo	1–0	1–0	UEFA Women's Euro 2025 qualifying
20	4 June 2024	Stadion Branko Čavlović-Čavlek, Karlovac, Croaita	51	Kosovo	1–0	2–0	UEFA Women's Euro 2025 qualifying
21	28 November 2025	Centenary Stadium, Ta' Qali, Malta	61	Malta	2–1	2–3	Friendly match
22	1 December 2025	Centenary Stadium, Ta' Qali, Malta	62	Malta	2–0	3–0	Friendly match
23	18 April 2026	Gradski stadion, Sinj, Croatia	66	Gibraltar	5–0	9–0	2027 FIFA Women's World Cup qualification
24	18 April 2026	Gradski stadion, Sinj, Croatia	66	Gibraltar	8–0	9–0	2027 FIFA Women's World Cup qualification

== Honours ==
Bayern Munich

- Frauen-Bundesliga: 2020–21, 2022–23
- Frauen DFB Pokal: 2011–12

Croatia

- Cyprus Women's Cup: 2020
