= 2020 Cyprus Women's Cup =

13th edition of the Cyprus Women's Cup

Tournament details
- Host country: Cyprus
- Dates: 5–11 March
- Teams: 5 (from 2 confederations)
- Venue(s): 5 (in 2 host cities)

Final positions
- Champions: Croatia (1st title)
- Runners-up: Finland
- Third place: Mexico
- Fourth place: Czech Republic

Tournament statistics
- Matches played: 6
- Goals scored: 19 (3.17 per match)
- Top scorer(s): four players (2 goals)

The 2020 Cyprus Women's Cup was the 13th edition of the Cyprus Women's Cup, an invitational women's football tournament held annually in Cyprus. It took place from 5 to 11 March 2020.

Croatia won the tournament for the first time.

== Venues ==
Larnaca
Ammochostos Stadium	Antonis Papadopoulos Stadium	AEK Arena – Georgios Karapatakis
Capacity: 5,500	Capacity: 10,230	Capacity: 7,400
Larnaca	2020 Cyprus Women's Cup is located in Cyprus	
GSZ Stadium	2020 Cyprus Women's Cup is located in Cyprus	
Capacity: 13,032	2020 Cyprus Women's Cup is located in Cyprus	
Paralimni	2020 Cyprus Women's Cup is located in Cyprus	
Paralimni Stadium	2020 Cyprus Women's Cup is located in Cyprus	
Capacity: 5,800	2020 Cyprus Women's Cup is located in Cyprus	

== Teams ==
Team	FIFA Rankings (December 2019)
Mexico	26
Czech Republic	28
Finland	28
~~Thailand~~	38
Slovakia	47
Croatia	52

Thailand were going to compete, but withdrew on 24 February 2020, due to coronavirus fears.

== Standings ==
As there was an uneven number of matches played, a coefficient-system was used to determine the final positions.

Pos	Team	Pld	W	D	L	GF	GA	GD	Pts	PPG
1	Croatia	2	1	1	0	4	3	+1	4	2.00
2	Finland	3	1	1	1	7	6	+1	4	1.33
3	Mexico	3	0	3	0	3	3	0	3	1.00
4	Czech Republic	2	0	2	0	1	1	0	2	1.00
5	Slovakia	2	0	1	1	4	6	−2	1	0.50

Source: Cypruswomenscup
Rules for classification: 1) Points; 2) Goal difference; 3) Goals scored

== Matches ==
All times are local (UTC+2).

5 March 2020
13:00

Croatia	1–1	Mexico
Lojna 20'	Report	Franco 3'

GSZ Stadium, Larnaca
5 March 2020
15:30

Czech Republic	1–1	Finland
Westerlund 48' (o.g.)	Report	Collin 68'

AEK Arena, Larnaca

8 March 2020
13:00

Finland	2–3	Croatia
Rantala 5'; Öling 20'	Report	Rudelić 21'; Lojna 40'; Landeka 55'

AEK Arena, Larnaca
8 March 2020
18:00

Mexico	2–2	Slovakia
Muñoz 47'; López 90+3'	Report	Hmírová 11'; Mikolajová 29'

AEK Arena, Larnaca

11 March 2020
13:00

Mexico	0–0	Czech Republic
	Report

AEK Arena, Larnaca
11 March 2020
15:30

Slovakia	2–4	Finland
Westerlund 11' (o.g.); Hmírová 90+1' (pen.)	Report	Öling 16'; Sällström 34'; Westerlund 75'; Collin 84'

GSZ Stadium, Larnaca

== Goalscorers ==
There were 19 goals scored in 6 matches, for an average of 3.17 goals per match.

2 goals

- (Croatia) Izabela Lojna
- (Finland) Kaisa Collin
- (Finland) Ria Öling
- (Slovakia) Patrícia Hmírová

1 goal

- (Croatia) Iva Landeka
- (Croatia) Ivana Rudelić
- (Finland) Jutta Rantala
- (Finland) Linda Sällström
- (Finland) Anna Westerlund
- (Mexico) Yamile Franco
- (Mexico) Jimena López
- (Mexico) Jennifer Muñoz
- (Slovakia) Mária Mikolajová

2 own goals

- (Finland) Anna Westerlund (playing against the Czech Republic and Slovakia)
