= Ria Laihonen =

Finnish footballer (born 1994)

Personal information
- Birth name: Ria Noora Minerva Öling
- Date of birth: 15 September 1994 (age 32)
- Place of birth: Vaasa, Finland
- Height: 1.69 m (5 ft 7 in)
- Position: Midfielder

Team information
- Current team: Rosengård

Youth career
- 2000–2008: FC Sport

Senior career*
Years	Team	Apps	(Gls)
2009–2011	VIFK	7	(4)
2012	PK-35 Vantaa	26	(3)
2013	VIFK	15	(19)
2014–2016	TPS	69	(49)
2017	Santa Teresa	8	(0)
2017	TPS	11	(12)
2018–2019	Brøndby	33	(17)
2019–2020	Växjö	36	(7)
2021–2024	Rosengård	95	(11)
2025	Crystal Palace	5	(0)
2025–2026	Braga	6	(1)
2026–	Rosengård	14	(1)

International career^{‡}
2015–	Finland	106	(14)
- * Club domestic league appearances and goals as of 27 June 2025 ‡ National team caps and goals as of 15 October 2026

Ria Noora Minerva Laihonen (née Öling, Finland Swedish: [ˈøːliŋ]; born 15 September 1994) is a Finnish footballer who plays as a midfielder for Damallsvenskan club FC Rosengård and the Finland national team.

== Club career ==
On 12 December 2013, Laihonen was announced at TPS.

In 2014, Laihonen was named Finland's Player of the Season after hitting 16 league goals for her club, TPS.

In January 2018, Laihonen signed for Danish champions Brøndby IF. In her first half season she won the Danish Cup with the club, and won the player of the tournament award. In her second season she won the Danish Championship.

In December 2020, Laihonen signed for Swedish club FC Rosengård On 19 October 2021, she won her first league title with the club. In May 2022, she signed a new two-year contract with the club until 2024. On 25 October 2022, Laihonen secured her second consecutive league title. After being drawn into the group stage of the Champions League, she became the second Finnish player to play in the group stage, with Tuija Hyyrynen being the first. On 21 April 2024, she scored in the 43rd minute over Kristianstads DFF. On 4 October 2024, after defeating Kristianstads DFF, she became league champions with FC Rosengård, the third Swedish championship of her career. Laihonen has played over 100 matches in the Damallsvenskan.

In January 2025, Laihonen signed a two and a half year contract with Women's Super League club Crystal Palace. On 10 June 2025, it was announced that Laihonen was departing the club at the end of the 2024-25 season, having made a total of 6 appearances for Palace across all competitions.

In August 2025, she signed with Braga in the Campeonato Nacional Feminino.

In January 2026, Laihonen rejoined FC Rosengård.

== International career ==
Laihonen played her first senior international for Finland women's national team in February 2015 against Sweden. She had already represented her country at the 2013 UEFA Women's U-19 Championship and the 2014 FIFA U-20 Women's World Cup.

Laihonen scored her first senior international goal on the occasion of her fifth cap, in a 1–0 UEFA Women's Euro 2017 qualifying win over Montenegro on 17 September 2015. She scored her second international goal against Slovakia in January 2017, scoring in the 32nd minute.

Laihonen was called up to the 2019 Cyprus Women's Cup and 2020 Cyprus Women's Cup squads.

On 21 September 2021, Laihonen scored in the 68th minute in a European qualifying match win over Slovakia.

Laihonen was called up to the UEFA Women's Euro 2022 squad.

Laihonen was part of the Finland squad that won the 2023 Cyprus Women's Cup for the first time. On 28 October 2023, Laihonen was banned from playing in the next match after picking up two yellow cards in two games.

On 19 June 2025, Laihonen was called up to the Finland squad for the UEFA Women's Euro 2025.

== Personal life ==
Laihonen has named Caroline Seger as one of her role models.

In July 2026, Laihonen—then known as Öling—married her partner, Finnish-Polish basketball player Mikael Laihonen. As of the August 2026, she is professionally known by her married name.

== Career statistics ==
=== Club ===
As of 10 May 2025

Appearances and goals by club, season and competition
Club	Season	League			Cup (Note: Includes Finnish Women's Cup, Svenska Cupen and Women's FA Cup)		League cup (Note: Includes Finnish Women's League Cup and FA Women's League Cup)		Europe		Total	
Club	Season	Division	Apps	Goals	Apps	Goals	Apps	Goals	Apps	Goals	Apps	Goals
Vasa IFK	2011	Naisten Kakkonen	7	4	–		–		–		7	4
PK-35 Vantaa	2012	Naisten Liiga	26	3	5	0	2	0	2 (Note: Appearances in UEFA Women's Champions League)	0	35	3
VJS (loan)	2012	Naisten Ykkönen	5	2	–		–		–		5	2
Vasa IFK	2013	Naisten Ykkönen	15	19	3	6	–		–		18	25
TPS	2014	Naisten Liiga	23	16	0	0	–		–		23	16
TPS	2015	Naisten Liiga	23	18	1	1	–		–		24	19
TPS	2016	Naisten Liiga	23	15	3	5	–		–		26	20
TPS	Total		69	49	4	6	0	0	0	0	73	55
Santa Teresa	2016–17	Primera División	8	0	–		–		–		8	0
TPS	2017	Naisten Liiga	11	12	1	0	–		–		12	12
Brøndby	2017–18	Danish Women's League	9	5	–		–		–		9	5
Brøndby	2018–19	Danish Women's League	24	12	0	0	–		4	0	28	12
Brøndby	Total		33	17	0	0	0	0	4	0	37	17
Växjö	2019	Damallsvenskan	15	5	2	1	–		–		17	6
Växjö	2020	Damallsvenskan	21	2	1	0	–		–		22	2
Växjö	Total		36	7	3	1	0	0	0	0	39	8
Rosengård	2021	Damallsvenskan	21	5	4	0	–		0	0	25	5
Rosengård	2022	Damallsvenskan	26	1	6	0	–		2	0	34	1
Rosengård	2023	Damallsvenskan	26	0	3	0	–		8	0	37	0
Rosengård	2024	Damallsvenskan	26	5	6	2	–		8	1	40	8
Rosengård	Total		99	11	19	2	0	0	18	1	136	14
Crystal Palace	2024–25	Women's Super League	5	0	1	0	0	0	–		6	0
Braga	2025–26	Campeonato Nacional Feminino	0	0	0	0	–		–		0	0
Career total			314	124	36	15	2	0	24	1	374	140

=== International goals ===
No.	Date	Venue	Opponent	Score	Result	Competition
1.	17 September 2015	Veritas Stadion, Turku, Finland	Montenegro	1–0	1–0	UEFA Women's Euro 2017 qualifying
2.	22 January 2017	Pinatar Arena, San Pedro del Pinatar, Spain	Slovakia	1–0	3–0	Friendly
3.	10 June 2017	Changzhou Olympic Sports Centre, Changzhou, China	China	1–0	2–4	Friendly
4.	4 October 2018	Yongchuan Sports Center, Chongqing, China	Thailand	2–0	3–1	2018 Yongchuan International Tournament
5.	4 October 2018	Yongchuan Sports Center, Chongqing, China	Thailand	3–1	3–1	2018 Yongchuan International Tournament
6.	8 October 2019	Hietalahti Stadium, Vaasa, Finland	Albania	4–0	8–1	UEFA Women's Euro 2022 qualifying
7.	8 March 2020	AEK Arena, Larnaca, Cyprus	Croatia	2–0	2–3	2020 Cyprus Women's Cup
8.	11 March 2020	GSZ Stadium, Larnaca, Cyprus	Slovakia	1–1	4–2	2020 Cyprus Women's Cup
9.	21 September 2021	Veritas Stadion, Turku, Finland	Slovakia	2–1	2–1	2023 FIFA Women's World Cup qualification
10.	1 December 2023	Veritas Stadion, Turku, Finland	Romania	2–0	6–0	2023–24 UEFA Nations League
11.	29 October 2024	Tammelan Stadion, Tampere, Finland	Montenegro	1–0	5–0	UEFA Women's Euro 2025 qualifying play-offs
12.	7 March 2026	Helsinki Football Stadium, Helsinki, Finland	Latvia	1–0	3–1	2027 FIFA Women's World Cup qualification
13.	7 March 2026	Helsinki Football Stadium, Helsinki, Finland	Latvia	2–0	3–1	2027 FIFA Women's World Cup qualification

== Honours ==
PK-35 Vantaa

- Naisten Liiga: 2012
- Finnish Women's Cup: 2012

Brøndby

- Danish Women's League: 2018–19
- Danish Women's Cup: 2017–18

FC Rosengård

- Damallsvenskan: 2021, 2022, 2024
- Svenska Cupen: 2021–22

== See also ==
- List of women's footballers with 100 or more international caps
