= 2023 Cyprus Women's Cup =

Tournament details
- Host country: Cyprus
- Dates: 16–22 February
- Teams: 4 (from 1 confederation)
- Venue: 2 (in 1 host city)

Final positions
- Champions: Finland (1st title)
- Runners-up: Croatia
- Third place: Romania
- Fourth place: Hungary

Tournament statistics
- Matches played: 6
- Goals scored: 23 (3.83 per match)
- Top scorer(s): (Finland) Linda Sällström (4 goals)

The 2023 Cyprus Women's Cup was the 14th and final edition of the Cyprus Women's Cup, an international women's football tournament. It was held in Cyprus from 16 to 22 February 2023.

Finland won the title for the first time.

== Format ==
The four invited teams played a round-robin tournament. Points awarded in the group stage followed the formula of three points for a win, one point for a draw, and zero points for a loss. A tie in points was decided by goal differential.

== Venues ==
Larnaca
GSZ Stadium	AEK Arena – Georgios Karapatakis
Capacity: 13,032	Capacity: 7,400
2023 Cyprus Women's Cup is located in Cyprus

== Teams ==
Team	FIFA Rankings (December 2022)
Finland	31
Romania	40
Hungary	42
Croatia	60

== Standings ==
Pos	Team	Pld	W	D	L	GF	GA	GD	Pts
1	Finland (C)	3	3	0	0	16	1	+15	9
2	Croatia	3	2	0	1	4	4	0	6
3	Romania	3	1	0	2	2	7	−5	3
4	Hungary	3	0	0	3	1	11	−10	0

Source: Soccerway
Rules for classification: 1) points; 2) goal difference; 3) goals scored; 4) head-to-head points; 5) head-to-head goal difference; 6) head-to-head number of goals scored; 7) FIFA ranking.
(C) Champions

== Results ==
All times are local (UTC+2).

16 February 2023
12:00

Romania	2–1	Hungary
Oprea 32'; Vătafu 50'	Report	Szabó 16'

GSZ Stadium, Larnaca
Referee: Maria Sole Ferrieri Caputi (Italy)
16 February 2023
17:00

Croatia	1–4	Finland
Nevrkla 8'	Report	Summanen 3'; Sällström 15'; Ahtinen 62'; Rantala 69'

GSZ Stadium, Larnaca
Referee: Marta Huerta de Aza (Spain)

19 February 2023
13:00

Finland	8–0	Hungary
Collin 21'; Koivisto 35'; Danielsson 43', 88'; Sällström 67', 77', 78'; Summanen 85'	Report

AEK Arena, Larnaca
Referee: Tess Olofsson (Sweden)
19 February 2023
18:00

Romania	0–2	Croatia
	Report	Nevrkla 51'; Rudelić 57'

AEK Arena, Larnaca
Referee: Rebecca Welch (England)

22 February 2023
13:00

Finland	4–0	Romania
Rantala 9'; Kollanen 43'; Heroum 76'; Franssi 84'	Report

AEK Arena, Larnaca
Referee: Marta Huerta de Aza (Spain)
22 February 2023
18:00

Hungary	0–1	Croatia
	Report	Rudelić 54'

AEK Arena, Larnaca
Referee: Maria Sole Ferrieri Caputi (Italy)

== Goalscorers ==
There were 23 goals scored in 6 matches, for an average of 3.83 goals per match.

4 goals

- (Finland) Linda Sällström

2 goals

- (Croatia) Kristina Nevrkla
- (Croatia) Ivana Rudelić
- (Finland) Jenny Danielsson
- (Finland) Jutta Rantala
- (Finland) Eveliina Summanen

1 goal

- (Finland) Olga Ahtinen
- (Finland) Kaisa Collin
- (Finland) Sanni Franssi
- (Finland) Nora Heroum
- (Finland) Heidi Kollanen
- (Finland) Vilma Koivisto
- (Hungary) Viktória Szabó
- (Romania) Olivia Oprea
- (Romania) Ștefania Vătafu
