= Vilma Koivisto =

Finnish footballer (born 2002)

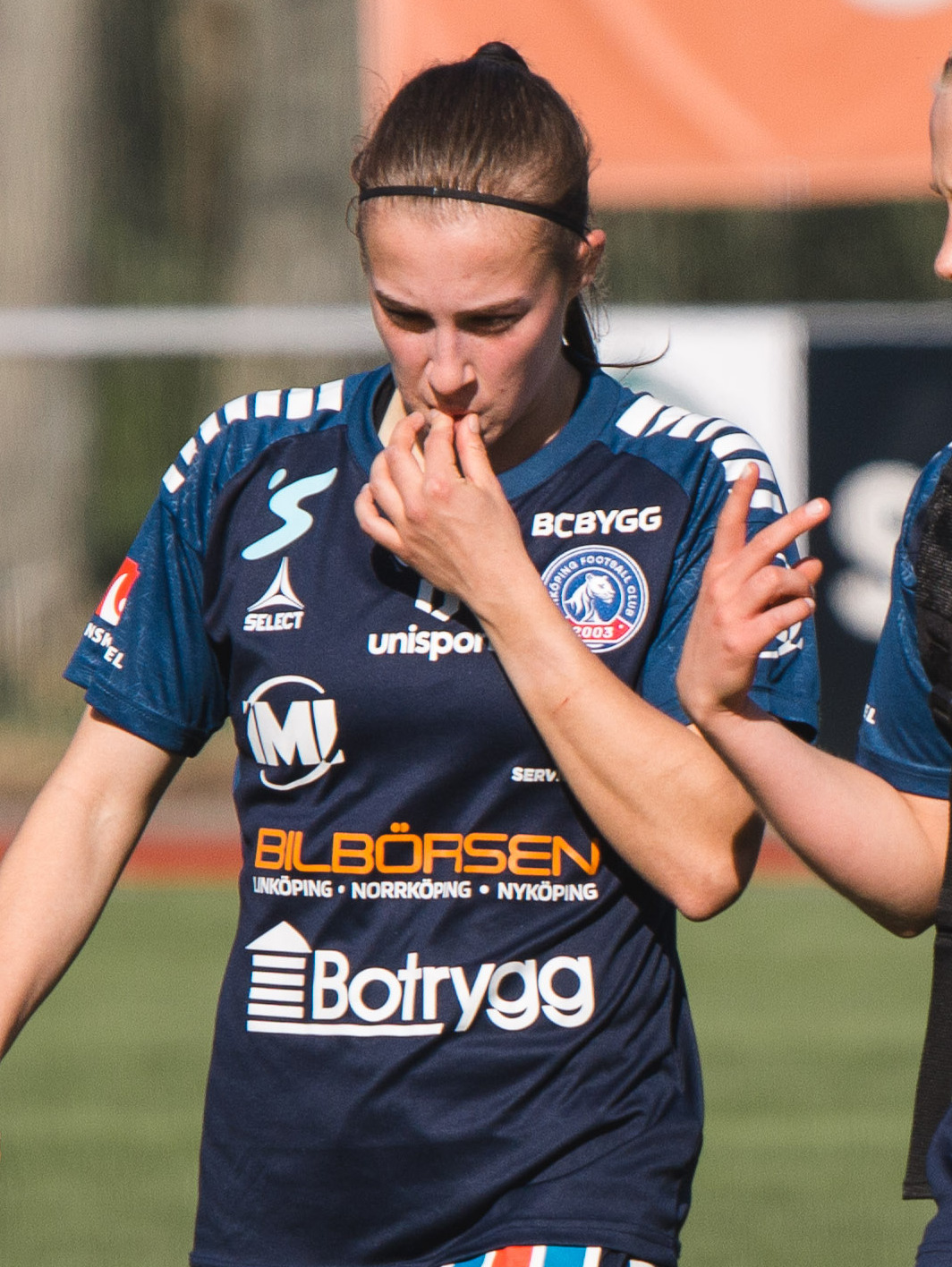
- Koivisto with Linköping FC in 2025

Personal information
- Full name: Vilma Emilia Koivisto
- Date of birth: 21 November 2002 (age 24)
- Place of birth: Rovaniemi, Finland
- Position: Midfielder

Team information
- Current team: Hammarby
- Number: 8

Youth career
- 2007–2017: RoPS
- 2018: Piteå IF

Senior career*
Years	Team	Apps	(Gls)
2019–2020	Piteå IF	18	(1)
2021–2023	Umeå IK	52	(9)
2023	IFK Norrköping	26	(3)
2024–2025	Linköping FC	38	(1)
2025–	Hammarby	38	(5)

International career^{‡}
2017–2019	Finland U17	22	(2)
2019	Finland U19	5	(3)
2022	Finland U23	3	(1)
2021–	Finland	19	(1)
- * Club domestic league appearances and goals as of 22 November 2026 ‡ National team caps and goals as of 11 October 2026

Vilma Emilia Koivisto (Finnish: ['ʋilmɑ 'emiliɑ 'koiʋisto] born 21 November 2002) is a Finnish footballer who plays as a midfielder for Damallsvenskan club Hammarby IF and the Finland national team.

Koivisto moved to Sweden in order to further her football career.

== Club career ==
On 18 December 2018, Koivisto's signing was announced at Piteå IF.

Koivisto's signing was announced at Umeå IK. She later extended her contract. Koivisto was part of the 2022 Umeå IK side that was relegated from the Damallsvenskan.

On 9 January 2023, Koivisto's signing was announced at IFK Norrköping.

Koivisto's signing was announced at Linköping FC.

== International career ==
Koivisto represented Finland U17 at the 2018 FIFA U-17 Women's World Cup in Uruguay.

She has played for the Finland U23s.

Koivisto scored her first international goal against Hungary on 19 February 2023, scoring in the 35th minute.

Koivisto was part of the Finland squad that won the 2023 Cyprus Women's Cup for the first time.

On 19 June 2025, Koivisto was called up to the Finland squad for the UEFA Women's Euro 2025.

== Personal life ==
Koivisto's father is former professional footballer Jarno Koivisto, who trains together with her.

== International goals ==
No.	Date	Venue	Opponent	Score	Result	Competition
1.	19 February 2023	AEK Arena, Larnaca, Cyprus	Hungary	2–0	8–0	2023 Cyprus Women's Cup
