= UEFA Women's Euro 2022 qualifying Group E =

Football tournament qualification stage

Group E of the UEFA Women's Euro 2022 qualifying competition consists of five teams: Scotland, Finland, Portugal, Albania, and Cyprus. The composition of the nine groups in the qualifying group stage was decided by the draw held on 21 February 2019, 13:30 CET (UTC+1), at the UEFA headquarters in Nyon, Switzerland. with the teams seeded according to their coefficient ranking.

The group is played in home-and-away round-robin format between August 2019 and December 2020. The group winners and the three best runners-up among all nine groups (not counting results against the sixth-placed team) qualify directly for the final tournament, while the remaining six runners-up advance to the play-offs.

On 17 March 2020, all matches were put on hold due to the COVID-19 pandemic.

== Standings ==
Pos	Team	Pld	W	D	L	GF	GA	GD	Pts	Qualification	Finland	Portugal	Scotland	Albania	Cyprus
1	Finland	8	7	1	0	24	2	+22	22	Final tournament	—	1–0	1–0	8–1	4–0
2	Portugal	8	6	1	1	10	2	+8	19	Play-offs	1–1	—	1–0	1–0	1–0
3	Scotland	8	4	0	4	26	5	+21	12		0–1	0–2	—	3–0	8–0
4	Albania	8	2	0	6	7	21	−14	6		0–3	0–1	0–5	—	4–0
5	Cyprus	8	0	0	8	0	37	−37	0		0–5	0–3	0–10	0–2	—

Source: UEFA
Rules for classification: Tiebreakers

== Matches ==
Times are CET/CEST, (Note: CEST (UTC+2) for dates between 31 March and 26 October 2019 and between 29 March and 24 October 2020, and CET (UTC+1) for all other dates.) as listed by UEFA (local times, if different, are in parentheses).

30 August 2019
20:35 (19:35 BST)

Scotland	8–0	Cyprus
Emslie 11'; Little 20', 40', 61', 83', 88'; J. Ross 52'; Weir 90+1'	Report

Easter Road, Edinburgh
Attendance: 6,206
Referee: Maria Sole Caputi (Italy)

2 September 2019
17:00

Albania	0–3	Finland
	Report	Sällström 10', 38'; Kollanen 26'

Elbasan Arena, Elbasan
Attendance: 100
Referee: Ruzanna Petrosyan (Armenia)

4 October 2019
18:00

Albania	0–1	Portugal
	Report	J. Silva 16'

Elbasan Arena, Elbasan
Attendance: 1,000
Referee: Ruzanna Petrosyan (Armenia)

8 October 2019
18:00 (19:00 EEST)

Finland	8–1	Albania
Westerlund 2'; Kollanen 9'; Franssi 17'; Öling 19'; Sällström 35', 75', 89', 90+4'	Report	Kuikka 77' (o.g.)

Hietalahti Stadium, Vaasa
Attendance: 2,702
Referee: Katalin Sipos (Hungary)

7 November 2019
17:00 (18:00 EET)

Finland	4–0	Cyprus
Sällström 36'; Alanen 45+1'; Kuikka 59'; Koivisto 79'	Report

Telia 5G -areena, Helsinki
Attendance: 1,857
Referee: Zuzana Valentová (Slovakia)

8 November 2019
18:10

Albania	0–5	Scotland
	Report	Emslie 15'; J. Ross 24'; Cuthbert 59'; Godfrey 64'; Murray 77'

Elbasan Arena, Elbasan
Attendance: 50
Referee: Emilie Dokset (Norway)

12 November 2019
19:30 (18:30 WET)

Portugal	1–1	Finland
Neto 32' (pen.)	Report	Sällström 90'

Estádio Municipal 22 de Junho, Vila Nova de Famalicão
Attendance: 1,186
Referee: Cheryl Foster (Wales)

11 March 2020
15:00 (16:00 EET)

Cyprus	0–2	Albania
	Report	Doci 33' (pen.); Bajramaj 65'

Ammochostos Stadium, Larnaca
Attendance: 70
Referee: Jelena Jermolajeva (Latvia)

23 October 2020 (Note: All matches originally scheduled to be played in April and June 2020 were postponed due to the COVID-19 pandemic in Europe. These matches were subsequently rescheduled to be played between September 2020 and February 2021.)
18:00 (19:00 EEST)

Cyprus	0–3	Portugal
	Report	Neto 19'; Di. Silva 56'; Capeta 90+1'

AEK Arena – Georgios Karapatakis, Larnaca
Attendance: 0
Referee: Michalina Diakow (Poland)
23 October 2020
20:30 (19:30 BST)

Scotland	3–0	Albania
Corsie 37'; Bajraktari 76' (o.g.); Weir 90+3' (pen.)	Report

Tynecastle Park, Edinburgh
Attendance: 127
Referee: Graziella Pirriatore (Italy)

27 October 2020
17:15 (18:15 EET)

Finland	1–0	Scotland
Summanen 49'	Report

Helsinki Football Stadium, Helsinki
Attendance: 1,500
Referee: Esther Staubli (Switzerland)
27 October 2020
19:00 (18:00 WET)

Portugal	1–0	Cyprus
C. Charalambous 61' (o.g.)	Report

Estádio António Coimbra da Mota, Estoril
Attendance: 0
Referee: Henrikke Nervik (Norway)

27 November 2020 (Note: Matches originally scheduled to be played on 18 September 2020 were rearranged following postponements to other matches due to the COVID-19 pandemic in Europe.)
14:00

Albania	4–0	Cyprus
Jashari 18'; Doci 80' (pen.); Gjini 87'; Maksuti 90+2'	Report

Loro Boriçi Stadium, Shkodër
Attendance: 0
Referee: Jelena Cvetković (Serbia)
27 November 2020
20:00 (19:00 WET)

Portugal	1–0	Scotland
Borges 69'	Report

Estádio do Restelo, Lisbon
Attendance: 0
Referee: Ivana Martinčić (Croatia)

1 December 2020 (Note: Matches originally scheduled to be played on 22 September 2020 were rearranged following postponements to other matches due to the COVID-19 pandemic in Europe.)
18:45 (17:45 WET)

Portugal	1–0	Albania
Capeta 57'	Report

Estádio do Restelo, Lisbon
Attendance: 0
Referee: Olga Zadinová (Czech Republic)
1 December 2020
20:30 (19:30 GMT)

Scotland	0–1	Finland
	Report	Rantanen 90+5'

Easter Road, Edinburgh
Attendance: 189
Referee: Katalin Kulcsár (Hungary)

19 February 2021
14:00 (15:00 EET)

Cyprus	0–10	Scotland
	Report	Cuthbert 11', 35'; Thomas 23', 71'; Weir 26'; Hanson 29'; Arnot 57'; Emslie 65'; J. Ross 70' (pen.), 74'

AEK Arena – Georgios Karapatakis, Larnaca
Attendance: 0
Referee: Riem Hussein (Germany)
19 February 2021
17:15 (18:15 EET)

Finland	1–0	Portugal
Sällström 90+3'	Report

Bolt Arena, Helsinki
Attendance: 0
Referee: Kateryna Monzul (Ukraine)

23 February 2021
16:10 (17:10 EET)

Scotland	0–2	Portugal
	Report	Capeta 27'; F. Pinto 90+2'

Antonis Papadopoulos Stadium, Larnaca
Attendance: 0
Referee: Sara Persson (Sweden)
23 February 2021
18:00 (19:00 EET)

Cyprus	0–5	Finland
	Report	Koivisto 4'; Sällström 6'; Engman 12'; Collin 31'; Kemppi 90+3'

AEK Arena – Georgios Karapatakis, Larnaca
Attendance: 0
Referee: Rebecca Welch (England)

== Goalscorers ==
There were 67 goals scored in 20 matches, for an average of 3.35 goals per match.

10 goals

- (Finland) Linda Sällström

5 goals

- (Scotland) Kim Little

4 goals

- (Scotland) Jane Ross

3 goals

- (Portugal) Ana Capeta
- (Scotland) Lizzie Arnot
- (Scotland) Erin Cuthbert
- (Scotland) Claire Emslie
- (Scotland) Caroline Weir

2 goals

- (Albania) Megi Doci
- (Finland) Emma Koivisto
- (Finland) Heidi Kollanen
- (Portugal) Cláudia Neto
- (Scotland) Martha Thomas

1 goal

- (Albania) Zylfije Bajramaj
- (Albania) Lucie Gjini
- (Albania) Suada Jashari
- (Albania) Kristina Maksuti
- (Finland) Emmi Alanen
- (Finland) Kaisa Collin
- (Finland) Adelina Engman
- (Finland) Sanni Franssi
- (Finland) Juliette Kemppi
- (Finland) Natalia Kuikka
- (Finland) Ria Öling
- (Finland) Amanda Rantanen
- (Finland) Eveliina Summanen
- (Finland) Anna Westerlund
- (Portugal) Ana Borges
- (Portugal) Fátima Pinto
- (Portugal) Diana Silva
- (Portugal) Jéssica Silva
- (Scotland) Rachel Corsie
- (Scotland) Kirsty Hanson
- (Scotland) Hannah Godfrey
- (Scotland) Christie Murray

1 own goal

- (Albania) Arbiona Bajraktari (against Scotland)
- (Cyprus) Chara Charalambous (against Portugal)
- (Finland) Natalia Kuikka (against Albania)
