= Heidi Kollanen =

Finnish footballer (born 1997)

Personal information
- Full name: Heidi Karoliina Kollanen
- Date of birth: 6 June 1997 (age 29)
- Place of birth: Tampere, Finland
- Height: 1.63 m (5 ft 4 in)
- Position: Forward

Team information
- Current team: Vittsjö GIK
- Number: 19

Youth career
- Ilves

College career
| Years | Team | Apps | (Gls) |
| 2016–2017 | Florida State Seminoles | 18 | (1) |

Senior career*
| Years | Team | Apps | (Gls) |
| 2012–2016 | Ilves | 46 | (36) |
| 2018 | PK-35 Vantaa | 22 | (15) |
| 2018–2019 | Tavagnacco | 15 | (5) |
| 2019–2023 | KIF Örebro | 90 | (18) |
| 2024–2026 | Vittsjö | 44 | (2) |
| 2026– | Trelleborg | 2 | (2) |

International career^{‡}
| 2014–2016 | Finland U19 | 12 | (13) |
| 2018 | Finland U23 | 1 | (0) |
| 2018– | Finland | 40 | (3) |
- * Club domestic league appearances and goals as of 21 April 2026 ‡ National team caps and goals as of 21 April 2026

Heidi Karoliina Kollanen (born 6 June 1997) is a Finnish footballer who plays as a forward for Elitettan club Trelleborgs FF and the Finland national team.

== Career ==
=== PK-35 Vantaa ===
At the beginning of the year, Kollanen suffered a knee injury. On 15 September 2018, Kollanen scored all 5 goals in a 5–1 win over Turun Palloseura. On 28 November 2017, Kollanen was announced at PK-35 Vantaa. During the club's 2018 season, she was the PK-35 Vantaa's top scorer.

=== Tavagnacco ===
On 20 November 2018, Kollanen was announced at Tavagnacco in Serie A.

=== KIF Örebro ===
On 15 December 2020, Kollanen extended her contract with KIF Örebro. On 30 December 2022, Kollanen signed a contract extension with the club.

=== Vittsjö GIK ===
On 22 December 2023, Kollanen was announced at Vittsjö GIK on a two-year contract.

== International career ==
Kollanen has been capped for the Finland national team, appearing for the team during the 2019 FIFA Women's World Cup qualifying cycle. She scored her first international goal against Albania on 2 September 2019, scoring in the 26th minute. Kollanen scored her second international goal on 8 October 2019, scoring against Albania in the 9th minute. She scored her third international goal against Romania on 22 February 2023, scoring in the 44th minute.

Kollanen was called up to the 2019 Cyprus Women's Cup squad.

Kollanen was called up to the 2020 Cyprus Women's Cup squad.

Kollanen was called up to the UEFA Women's Euro 2022 squad.

Kollanen was part of the Finland squad that won the 2023 Cyprus Women's Cup for the first time.

On 19 June 2025, Kollanen was called up to the Finland squad for the UEFA Women's Euro 2025.

== International goals ==
| No. | Date | Venue | Opponent | Score | Result | Competition |
|---|---|---|---|---|---|---|
| 1. | 2 September 2019 | Elbasan Arena, Elbasan, Albania | Albania | 2–0 | 3–0 | UEFA Women's Euro 2022 qualifying |
| 2. | 8 October 2019 | Hietalahti Stadium, Vaasa, Finland | Albania | 2–0 | 8–1 | UEFA Women's Euro 2022 qualifying |
| 3. | 22 February 2023 | AEK Arena, Larnaca, Cyprus | Romania | 2–0 | 4–0 | 2023 Cyprus Women's Cup |
