= Kaisa Collin =

Finnish footballer (born 1997)

Personal information
- Full name: Kaisa Astrid Collin
- Date of birth: 16 April 1997 (age 29)
- Place of birth: Helsinki, Finland
- Position: Forward

Team information
- Current team: AIK
- Number: 8

Youth career
- IF Gnistan
- HJK

Senior career*
Years	Team	Apps	(Gls)
2014–2016	HJK	48	(36)
2017–2018	PK-35	41	(27)
2019–2021	Eskilstuna United	48	(5)
2021–2022	AIK	27	(3)
2023–	Eskilstuna United	17	(3)

International career^{‡}
2017–	Finland	21	(5)
- * Club domestic league appearances and goals as of 12:57, 16 September 2024 (UTC) ‡ National team caps and goals as of 13 September 2023

Kaisa Collin (born 16 April 1997) is a Finnish footballer who plays as a forward for Eskilstuna United and the Finland national team.

She previously played for HJK and PK-35 of the Naisten Liiga.

== Club career ==
=== HJK ===
Collin scored on her league debut on 21 September 2014, scoring against Kokkola F10 in the 44th and 84th minute.

=== PK-35 ===
Collin scored on her league debut against Pallokissat on 18 March 2017, scoring in the 57th minute. On 17 November 2017, she signed a contract extension with PK-35 for the 2018 season. She was also chosen as the Female Player of the Year.

=== First spell at Eskilstuna United ===
In January 2019 Collin agreed a transfer from PK-35 to Eskilstuna United DFF of the Swedish Damallsvenskan. She made her league debut against Växjö DFF on 28 April 2019. Collin scored her first league goal against Limhamn Bunkeflo on 5 May 2019, scoring in the 60th minute.

=== AIK ===
On 2 August 2021, Collin was announced at AIK. She made her league debut against Kristianstad on 14 August 2021. Collin scored her first league goal against Vittsjö GIK on 30 October 2021, scoring in the 9th minute.

=== Second spell at Eskilstuna United ===
In 2023, Collin was announced at Eskilstuna United. She made her league debut against Alingsås on 3 June 2023. Collin scored her first league goal against Uddevalla on 12 November 2023, scoring in the 22nd minute.

== International career ==
Collin made her debut for the Finland women's national team on 7 April 2017, in a 1–0 defeat by Poland in Pruszków. She scored her first international goal against Portugal in September 2017. Collin scored her second international goal against Israel on 26 November 2017, scoring in the 40th minute.

Collin was called up to the 2020 Cyprus Women's Cup squad. She scored her third international goal against Czech Republic on 5 March 2020, scoring in the 68th minute. Collin scored in the final game of the Cyprus Cup against Slovakia on 11 March 2020, scoring in the 84th minute.

Collin was part of the team that went through the 2021 Euro qualifying matches without defeat, for the first time in Finland's history. She also scored in the final match of the qualifiers, scoring in the 31st minute against Cyprus.

On 19 February 2023, Collin scored against Hungary in the 21st minute.

Collin was part of the Finland squad that won the 2023 Cyprus Women's Cup for the first time.

== International goals ==
No.	Date	Venue	Opponent	Score	Result	Competition
1.	26 November 2017	Telia 5G -areena, Helsinki, Finland	Israel	1–0	4–0	2019 FIFA Women's World Cup qualification
2.	5 March 2020	AEK Arena, Larnaca, Cyprus	Czech Republic	1–1	1–1	2020 Cyprus Women's Cup
3.	11 March 2020	GSZ Stadium, Larnaca, Cyprus	Slovakia	4–1	4–2	2020 Cyprus Women's Cup
4.	19 February 2023	AEK Arena, Larnaca, Cyprus	Hungary	1–0	8–0	2023 Cyprus Women's Cup
