= Linda Sällström =

Finnish footballer (born 1988)

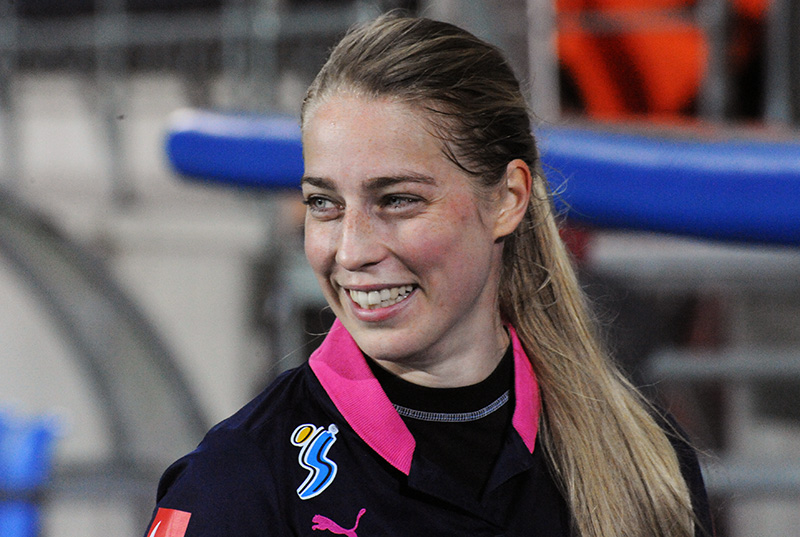
- Linda Sällström in 2014

Personal information
- Full name: Linda Charlotta Sällström
- Date of birth: 13 July 1988 (age 38)
- Place of birth: Vantaa, Finland
- Height: 1.71 m (5 ft 7 in)
- Position: Striker

Youth career
- KOPSE

Senior career*
Years	Team	Apps	(Gls)
2003–2007	Tikkurilan Palloseura	89	(70)
2008–2009	Djurgårdens IF	43	(16)
2010–2014	Linköpings FC	59	(23)
2015–2018	Vittsjö GIK	71	(29)
2018–2021	Paris FC	52	(18)
2021	HJK	8	(2)
2022–2025	Vittsjö GIK	96	(11)
Total		418	(169)

International career
2007–2025	Finland	157	(64)
- * Club domestic league appearances and goals

Linda Charlotta Sällström (born 13 July 1988) is a Finnish former professional footballer. She last played for Vittsjö GIK in the Damallsvenskan. She is the most capped player and top scorer of the Finland women's national football team.

== Career ==
She made her debut for the senior Finland team on 31 May 2007, playing 17 minutes against Norway.

Sällström missed the entire 2012 season with an anterior cruciate ligament injury. She re-injured the knee in March 2013 and was ruled out of contention for a place in Finland's UEFA Women's Euro 2013 squad.

On 25 January 2014 Sällstrom injured her anterior cruciate ligament (ACL) again, making it likely she would miss the 2014 season.

In total Sällström has endured three ACL injuries in her career. Coming back from injury to finish as second highest goalscorer in the 2017–18 Damallsvenskan season.

== International career ==
On 8 October 2019, Sällström scored four goals against Albania to become the all-time top scorer for Finland, surpassing Laura Österberg Kalmari.

On 7 November 2019, Sällström played her 100th match against Cyprus.

On 19 June 2025, Sällström was called up to the Finland squad for the UEFA Women's Euro 2025.

== Personal life ==
Sällström is openly lesbian.. During the season-opening of Tanssii tähtien kanssa, Linda revealed that she is in a relationship and is currently studying in Malmö to become a doctor. Linda's partner, Marena even joined the dance in 1 November broadcast.

== International goals ==
#	Date	Venue	Opponent	Score	Result	Competition
1	29 September 2007	Helsinki Olympic Stadium, Helsinki, Finland	Scotland	1–0	4–1	Friendly
2	28 May 2009	Helsinki Olympic Stadium, Helsinki, Finland	Italy	1–1	3–2	Friendly
3	28 May 2009	Helsinki Olympic Stadium, Helsinki, Finland	Italy	2–2	3–2	Friendly
4	22 July 2009	Pori Stadium, Pori, Finland	Sweden	1–2	1–3	Friendly
5	3 September 2009	Veritas Stadion, Turku, Finland	England	2–3	2–3	UEFA Women's Euro 2009
6	24 February 2010	Municipal Stadium, Lagos, Portugal	China	1–1	1–1	2010 Algarve Cup
7	19 June 2010	ISS Stadion, Vantaa, Finland	Portugal	4–1	4–1	2011 FIFA Women's World Cup qualification
8	23 June 2010	ISS Stadion, Vantaa, Finland	Italy	1–1	1–3	2011 FIFA Women's World Cup qualification
9	25 August 2010	Wiklöf Holding Arena, Mariehamn, Finland	Slovenia	1–0	4–1	2011 FIFA Women's World Cup qualification
10	25 August 2010	Wiklöf Holding Arena, Mariehamn, Finland	Slovenia	2–1	4–1	2011 FIFA Women's World Cup qualification
11	25 August 2010	Wiklöf Holding Arena, Mariehamn, Finland	Slovenia	4–1	4–1	2011 FIFA Women's World Cup qualification
12	16 February 2011	Tammelan Stadion, Tammela, Finland	Russia	1–1	5–4	Friendly
13	16 February 2011	Tammelan Stadion, Tammela, Finland	Russia	3–2	5–4	Friendly
14	16 February 2011	Tammelan Stadion, Tammela, Finland	Russia	5–4	5–4	Friendly
15	18 September 2011	Töölö Football Stadium, Helsinki, Finland	Scotland	1–0	1–0	Friendly
16	22 October 2011	ISS Stadion, Vantaa, Finland	Estonia	1–0	6–0	UEFA Women's Euro 2013 qualifying
17	22 October 2011	ISS Stadion, Vantaa, Finland	Estonia	4–0	6–0	UEFA Women's Euro 2013 qualifying
18	22 October 2011	ISS Stadion, Vantaa, Finland	Estonia	5–0	6–0	UEFA Women's Euro 2013 qualifying
19	27 October 2011	City Stadium, Maladzyechna, Belarus	Belarus	1–0	2–2	UEFA Women's Euro 2013 qualifying
20	27 October 2011	City Stadium, Maladzyechna, Belarus	Belarus	2–1	2–2	UEFA Women's Euro 2013 qualifying
21	1 March 2012	GSZ Stadium, Larnaca, Cyprus	France	1–1	1–2	2012 Cyprus Women's Cup
22	4 March 2012	GSZ Stadium, Larnaca, Cyprus	Switzerland	1–0	3–1	2012 Cyprus Women's Cup
23	4 March 2012	GSZ Stadium, Larnaca, Cyprus	Switzerland	2–0	3–1	2012 Cyprus Women's Cup
24	4 March 2012	GSZ Stadium, Larnaca, Cyprus	Switzerland	3–0	3–1	2012 Cyprus Women's Cup
25	6 March 2012	GSZ Stadium, Larnaca, Cyprus	South Korea	1–0	1–1 (Note: Finland lost 6–7 after the penalty shootout.)	2012 Cyprus Women's Cup
26	14 February 2013	Tammelan Stadion, Tammela, Finland	Russia	4–0	5–0	Friendly
27	21 September 2015	Tallaght Stadium, Dublin, Ireland	Republic of Ireland	2–0	2–0	UEFA Women's Euro 2017 qualifying
28	12 April 2016	Stadion pod Malim brdom, Petrovac, Montenegro	Montenegro	1–0	7–1	UEFA Women's Euro 2017 qualifying
29	3 June 2016	Tehtaan kenttä, Valkeakoski, Finland	Republic of Ireland	4–1	4–1	UEFA Women's Euro 2017 qualifying
30	22 January 2017	Pinatar Arena, San Pedro del Pinatar, Spain	Slovakia	2–0	3–0	Friendly
31	5 March 2017	Serbian FA Sports Center, Stara Pazova, Serbia	Serbia	1–0	1–2	Friendly
32	11 June 2017	Changzhou Olympic Sports Centre, Changzhou, China	China	2–3	2–4	Friendly
33	26 November 2017	Telia 5G -areena, Helsinki, Finland	Israel	2–0	4–0	2019 FIFA Women's World Cup qualification
34	26 November 2017	Telia 5G -areena, Helsinki, Finland	Israel	4–0	4–0	2019 FIFA Women's World Cup qualification
35	7 March 2018	Tasos Markos Stadium, Paralimni, Cyprus	Hungary	1–0	2–0	2018 Cyprus Women's Cup
36	31 August 2018	El Sardinero, Santander, Spain	Spain	1–1	1–5	2019 FIFA Women's World Cup qualification
37	4 September 2018	Stadion Wiener Neustadt, Wiener Neustadt, Austria	Austria	1–2	1–4	2019 FIFA Women's World Cup qualification
38	2 September 2019	Elbasan Arena, Elbasan, Albania	Albania	1–0	3–0	UEFA Women's Euro 2022 qualifying
39	2 September 2019	Elbasan Arena, Elbasan, Albania	Albania	3–0	3–0	UEFA Women's Euro 2022 qualifying
40	8 October 2019	Hietalahti Stadium, Vaasa, Finland	Albania	5–0	8–1	UEFA Women's Euro 2022 qualifying
41	8 October 2019	Hietalahti Stadium, Vaasa, Finland	Albania	6–0	8–1	UEFA Women's Euro 2022 qualifying
42	8 October 2019	Hietalahti Stadium, Vaasa, Finland	Albania	7–1	8–1	UEFA Women's Euro 2022 qualifying
43	8 October 2019	Hietalahti Stadium, Vaasa, Finland	Albania	8–1	8–1	UEFA Women's Euro 2022 qualifying
44	7 November 2019	Telia 5G -areena, Helsinki, Finland	Cyprus	1–0	4–0	UEFA Women's Euro 2022 qualifying
45	12 November 2019	Estádio Municipal 22 de Junho, Vila Nova de Famalicão, Portugal	Portugal	1–1	1–1	UEFA Women's Euro 2022 qualifying
46	11 March 2020	GSZ Stadium, Larnaca, Cyprus	Slovakia	2–1	4–2	2020 Cyprus Women's Cup
47	19 February 2021	Bolt Arena, Helsinki, Finland	Portugal	1–0	1–0	UEFA Women's Euro 2022 qualifying
48	23 February 2021	AEK Arena – Georgios Karapatakis, Larnaca, Cyprus	Cyprus	2–0	5–0	UEFA Women's Euro 2022 qualifying
49	21 October 2021	Mikheil Meskhi Stadium, Tbisili, Georgia	Georgia	1–0	3–0	2023 FIFA Women's World Cup qualifying
50	25 November 2021	Gamla Ullevi, Gothenburg, Sweden	Sweden	1–1	1–2	2023 FIFA Women's World Cup qualifying
51	9 July 2022	Stadium MK, Milton Keynes, England	Spain	1–0	1–4	UEFA Women's Euro 2022
52	16 February 2023	GSZ Stadium, Larnaca, Cyprus	Croatia	2–1	4–1	2023 Cyprus Women's Cup
53	19 February 2023	GSZ Stadium, Larnaca, Cyprus	Hungary	4–0	8–0	2023 Cyprus Women's Cup
54	19 February 2023	GSZ Stadium, Larnaca, Cyprus	Hungary	5–0	8–0	2023 Cyprus Women's Cup
55	19 February 2023	GSZ Stadium, Larnaca, Cyprus	Hungary	6–0	8–0	2023 Cyprus Women's Cup
56	22 September 2023	Veritas Stadion, Turku, Finland	Slovakia	1–0	4–0	2023–24 UEFA Women's Nations League
57	27 October 2023	Bolt Arena, Helsinki, Finland	Croatia	1–0	3–0	2023–24 UEFA Women's Nations League
58	30 November 2023	Veritas Stadion, Turku, Finland	Romania	1–0	6–0	2023–24 UEFA Women's Nations League
59	30 November 2023	Veritas Stadion, Turku, Finland	Romania	3–0	6–0	2023–24 UEFA Women's Nations League
60	25 October 2024	Podgorica City Stadium, Podgorica, Montenegro	Montenegro	1–0	1–0	UEFA Women's Euro 2025 qualifying play-offs
61	29 October 2024	Tammelan Stadion, Tampere, Finland	Montenegro	4–0	5–0	UEFA Women's Euro 2025 qualifying play-offs
62	8 April 2025	Tammelan Stadion, Tampere, Finland	Hungary	2–0	3–0	2025 UEFA Women's Nations League
63	30 May 2025	Szent Gellért Fórum, Szeged, Hungary	Belarus	2–0	3–0	2025 UEFA Women's Nations League
64	30 May 2025	Szent Gellért Fórum, Szeged, Hungary	Belarus	3–0	3–0	2025 UEFA Women's Nations League

Correct as of 30 May 2025

== Career statistics ==
=== Club ===
Club	Season	Division	League		Cup		Continental		Total	
Club	Season	Division	Apps	Goals	Apps	Goals	Apps	Goals	Apps	Goals
Djurgardens	2009	Damallsvenska	21	9					21	9
Linkopings	2010	Damallsvenska	23	11			6	4	29	15
Linkopings	2011	Damallsvenska	22	8	4	4			26	12
Linkopings	2013	Damallsvenska	4	0					4	0
Linkopings	2014	Damallsvenska	2	1			3	0	5	1
Linkopings	Total		51	20	4	4	9	4	64	28
Vittsjo	2015	Damallsvenska	18	3	2	1			20	4
Vittsjo	2016	Damallsvenska	20	4	1	0			21	4
Vittsjo	2017	Damallsvenska	22	15	4	2			26	17
Vittsjo	2018	Damallsvenska	11	7			2	0	13	7
Vittsjo	2022	Damallsvenska	22	6	3	2	2	0	27	8
Vittsjo	2023	Damallsvenska	26	2	1	1			27	3
Vittsjo	2024	Damallsvenska	25	0	3	0			28	0
Vittsjo	2025	Damallsvenska	26	3	1	2			27	5
Vittsjo	Total		170	40	15	8	4	0	189	48
Paris	2018-19	Ligue Féminine	21	12					21	12
Paris	2019-20	Ligue Féminine	12	4					12	4
Paris	2020-21	Ligue Féminine	19	1	1	1			20	2
Paris	Total		52	17	1	1			53	18
HJK	2021	Kansallinen Liiga	8	2					8	2
Total career			302	88	20	13	13	4	335	105
