= Amanda Rantanen =

Finnish football player (born 1998)

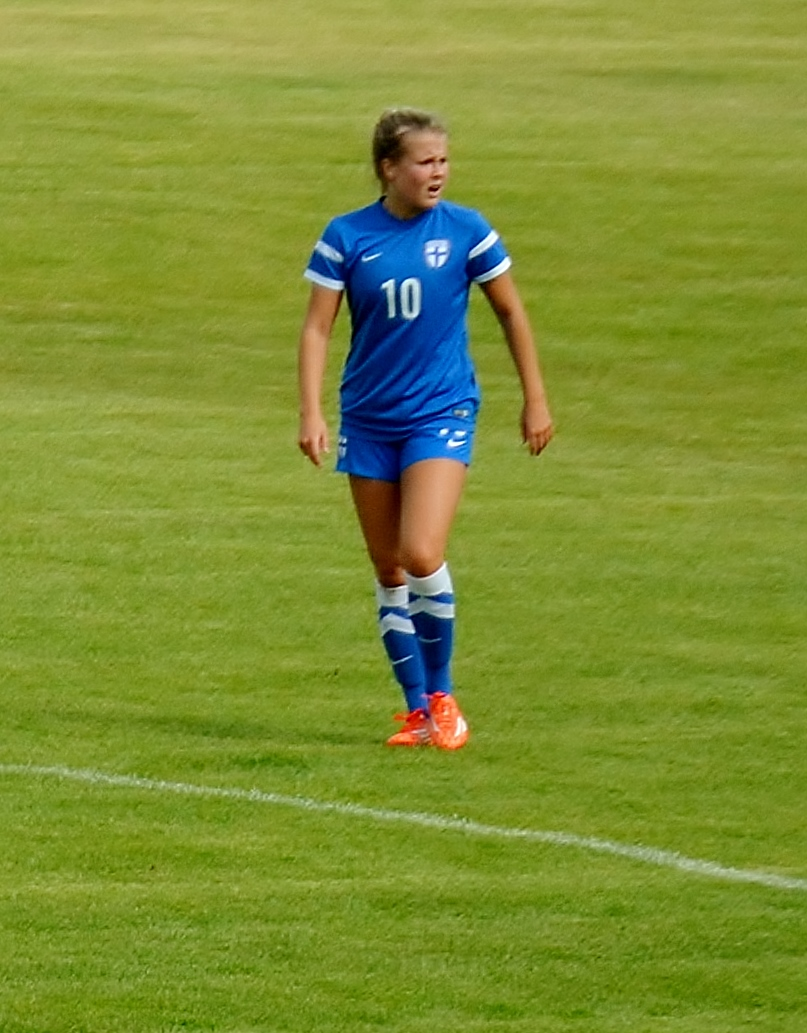
- Rantanen playing for U17 national team

Personal information
- Full name: Amanda Alexandra Rantanen
- Date of birth: 11 May 1998 (age 28)
- Place of birth: Helsinki, Finland
- Height: 1.65 m (5 ft 5 in)
- Position: Forward

Team information
- Current team: Linköpings FC
- Number: 88

Senior career*
Years	Team	Apps	(Gls)
2016–2017	HJK	11	(2)
2018–2021	PK-35	66	(41)
2021–2022	KIF Örebro	30	(6)
2023–	Linköpings FC	12	(0)

International career^{‡}
2020–	Finland	12	(1)
- * Club domestic league appearances and goals as of 22:29, 13 October 2024 (UTC) ‡ National team caps and goals as of 29 August 2023

Amanda Alexandra Rantanen (born 11 May 1998) is a Finnish footballer who plays as a forward for Linköping FC in the Swedish Damallsvenskan and the Finland women's national team.

== Career ==
Rantanen made her senior debut for HJK on 16 April 2016. During her time at HJK, she suffered from injuries, including an ankle injury, and had to have ankle surgery at the end of the 2016 season. Rantanen scored her first league goal against GBK on 7 May 2017, scoring in the 28th minute.

In 2018, Rantanen moved to PK-35 and helped them to achieve promotion to Kansallinen Liiga in 2019. She scored against PK-35 Vantaa on 26 August 2020, scoring in the 70th minute.

In 2020, she won the Female Player of the Year award whilst playing for PK-35.

On 4 August 2021, Rantanen was announced at KIF Örebro. On 17 November 2022, it was announced that she would be leaving KIF Örebro.

In May 2023, Rantanen suffered a stress fracture in her right leg. In August 2024, a stress fracture occurred in her left leg.

== International career ==
Rantanen scored on her first senior international appearance for Finland women's national team on 1 December 2020 against Scotland, scoring a last-minute winner. The goal was nominated for the Most Inspiring Moment of the Year award at the Finnish Sports Gala.

Rantanen won the 2020 Sports Performance of the Year award from the Helsinki Sports Reporters Association for her last-minute goal against Scotland.

On 19 February 2021, she made her second international appearance against Portugal on 19 February 2021.

Rantanen was called up to the UEFA Women's Euro 2022 squad.

== Personal life ==
Rantanen suffered from an eating disorder in 2016, but was able to overcome it.

She is in a relationship with Finnish ice hockey player Kristian Vesalainen. In January 2025, they revealed she was expecting their first child.

== International goals ==
No.	Date	Venue	Opponent	Score	Result	Competition
1.	1 December 2020	Easter Road, Edinburgh, Scotland	Scotland	1–0	1–0	UEFA Women's Euro 2022 qualifying
