= Cyprus Women's Cup =

- Founded: 2008
- Abolished: 2023
- Region: Cyprus
- Teams: 12
- Last champions: Finland (1st title)
- Most championships: Canada; England (3 titles each)
- Website: Official website

The Cyprus Women's Cup was a global invitational tournament for national teams in women's football. It was held annually in Cyprus since 2008 until the introduction of the UEFA Women's Nations League in 2023. Although the competition takes place in Cyprus, the hosts never took part in the competition.

It was played in late February or early March, at the same time as the Algarve Cup, the Arnold Clark Cup, the Cup of Nations, the Istria Cup, the Pinatar Cup, the SheBelieves Cup, the Tournoi de France, the Turkish Women's Cup and the Women's Revelations Cup.

Canada became the first winners in 2008 and Finland were the final winners in 2023.

Canada and England currently have three titles, followed by France with two titles while Croatia, Finland, North Korea, Switzerland, Austria and Spain all have single titles.

== Format ==
The Cyprus Women's Cup uses the following two-phase format:

The first phase is a group stage in which the twelve invited teams are divided into three groups of four teams. Similar to the Algarve Cup, the teams in Group A and Group B consist of higher-ranked teams and are the only teams actually in contention for the championship; Group C consists of lower-ranked teams. Each group plays a round-robin of six games, with each team playing one match against each of the other teams in the same group.

The second phase is a single "finals day" in which six games involving all twelve teams are played to determine the tournament's final standings, with the match-ups as follows:

- 11th place match: 3rd best 4th placed team vs. 2nd best 4th placed team
- 9th place match: Best 4th placed team vs. 3rd best 3rd placed team
- 7th place match: 2nd best 3rd placed team vs. best 3rd placed team
- 5th place match: 3rd best 2nd placed team vs. 2nd best 2nd placed team
- 3rd place match: 3rd best group winner vs. best 2nd placed team
- Final: Best group winner vs. 2nd best group winner

== Results ==
Year	Final			Third place match		
Year	Winner	Score	Runner-up	Third place	Score	Fourth place
2008	Canada	3–2	United States (U20)	Japan	2–1	Netherlands
2009	England	3–1	Canada	France	1–1 (a.e.t.); 6–5 (pen.)	New Zealand
2010	Canada	1–0	New Zealand	Netherlands	4–0	Switzerland
2011	Canada	2–1	Netherlands	France	3–0	Scotland
2012	France	2–0	Canada	Italy	3–1	England
2013	England	1–0	Canada	New Zealand	2–1	Switzerland
2014	France	2–0	England	South Korea	1–1 (a.e.t.); 3–1 (pen.)	Scotland
2015	England	1–0	Canada	Mexico	3–2	Italy
2016	Austria	2–1	Poland	Italy	3–1	Czech Republic
2017	Switzerland	1–0	South Korea	North Korea	2–0	Republic of Ireland
2018	Spain	2–0	Italy	North Korea	2–1	Switzerland
2019	North Korea	3–3; 7–6 (pen.)	Italy	Belgium	0–0; 3–2 (pen.)	Austria
2020	Croatia	Round-robin	Finland	Mexico	Round-robin	Czech Republic
2021	Cancelled due to the COVID-19 pandemic			Cancelled due to the COVID-19 pandemic		
2022	Cancelled due to the COVID-19 pandemic			Cancelled due to the COVID-19 pandemic		
2023	Finland	Round-robin	Croatia	Romania	Round-robin	Hungary

== Teams reaching the top four ==
Team	Champions	Runners-up	Third place	Fourth place	Total top four
Canada	3 (2008, 2010, 2011)	4 (2009, 2012, 2013, 2015)			7
England	3 (2009, 2013, 2015)	1 (2014)		1 (2012)	5
France	2 (2012, 2014)		2 (2009, 2011)		4
Croatia	1 (2020)	1 (2023)			2
Finland	1 (2023)	1 (2020)			2
North Korea	1 (2019)		2 (2017, 2018)		3
Switzerland	1 (2017)			3 (2010, 2013, 2018)	4
Austria	1 (2016)			1 (2019)	2
Spain	1 (2018)				1
Italy		2 (2018, 2019)	2 (2012, 2016)	1 (2015)	5
Netherlands		1 (2011)	1 (2010)	1 (2008)	3
New Zealand		1 (2010)	1 (2013)	1 (2009)	3
South Korea		1 (2017)	1 (2014)		2
Poland		1 (2016)			1
United States (U20)		1 (2008)			1
Mexico			2 (2015, 2020)		2
Japan			1 (2008)		1
Belgium			1 (2019)		1
Romania			1 (2023)		1
Czech Republic				2 (2016, 2020)	2
Scotland				2 (2011, 2014)	2
Republic of Ireland				1 (2017)	1
Hungary				1 (2023)	1
Total (23 teams)	14	14	14	14	56

== Participating nations ==
Team	08	09	10	11	12	13	14	15	16	17	18	19	20	23	Years
Australia	–	–	–	–	–	–	7th	5th	–	–	–	–	–	–	2
Austria	–	–	–	–	–	–	–	–	1st	8th	7th	4th	–	–	4
Belgium	–	–	–	–	–	–	–	12th	–	7th	5th	3rd	–	–	4
Canada	1st	2nd	1st	1st	2nd	2nd	5th	2nd	–	–	–	–	–	–	8
Croatia	–	–	–	–	–	–	–	–	–	–	–	–	1st	2nd	2
Czech Republic	–	–	–	–	–	–	–	6th	4th	12th	9th	6th	4th	–	6
England	–	1st	5th	5th	4th	1st	2nd	1st	–	–	–	–	–	–	7
Finland	–	–	–	–	6th	7th	12th	9th	8th	–	11th	9th	2nd	1st	9
France	–	3rd	–	3rd	1st	–	1st	–	–	–	–	–	–	–	4
Hungary	–	–	–	–	–	–	–	–	5th	10th	12th	11th	–	4th	5
Republic of Ireland	–	–	–	–	–	8th	6th	–	7th	4th	–	–	–	–	4
Italy	–	–	6th	9th	3rd	9th	8th	4th	3rd	11th	2nd	2nd	–	–	10
Japan	3rd	–	–	–	–	–	–	–	–	–	–	–	–	–	1
Mexico	–	–	–	7th	–	–	–	3rd	–	–	–	5th	3rd	–	4
Netherlands	4th	5th	3rd	2nd	7th	6th	9th	8th	–	–	–	–	–	–	8
New Zealand	–	4th	2nd	8th	8th	3rd	11th	–	–	9th	–	–	–	–	7
Nigeria	–	–	–	–	–	–	–	–	–	–	–	7th	–	–	1
Northern Ireland	–	–	–	12th	12th	12th	–	–	–	–	–	–	–	–	3
North Korea	–	–	–	–	–	–	–	–	–	3rd	3rd	1st	–	–	3
Poland	–	–	–	–	–	–	–	–	2nd	–	–	–	–	–	1
Romania	–	–	–	–	–	–	–	–	–	–	–	–	–	3rd	1
Russia	5th	8th	–	10th	–	–	–	–	–	–	–	–	–	–	3
Scotland	6th	7th	7th	4th	9th	5th	4th	7th	–	5th	–	–	–	–	9
Slovakia	–	–	–	–	–	–	–	–	–	–	10th	12th	5th	–	3
South Africa	–	6th	8th	–	10th	11th	–	10th	–	–	6th	10th	–	–	7
South Korea	–	–	–	6th	5th	10th	3rd	11th	–	2nd	–	–	–	–	6
Spain	–	–	–	–	–	–	–	–	–	–	1st	–	–	–	1
Switzerland	–	–	4th	11th	11th	4th	10th	–	–	1st	4th	–	–	–	7
Thailand	–	–	–	–	–	–	–	–	–	–	–	8th	WD	–	1
United States (U20)	2nd	–	–	–	–	–	–	–	–	–	–	–	–	–	1
Wales	–	–	–	–	–	–	–	–	6th	6th	8th	–	–	–	3
Total	6	8	8	12	12	12	12	12	12	12	12	12	5	4	

== General statistics ==
As of 2018

Rank	Team	Part	Pld	W	D	L	GF	GA	Dif	Pts
1	Canada	8	32	25	1	6	51	24	+27	76
2	England	7	28	18	4	6	56	30	+26	58
3	Scotland	9	36	14	5	17	48	60	−12	47
4	Italy	9	36	12	6	18	50	61	−11	42
5	France	4	16	12	3	1	38	13	+25	39
6	Netherlands	8	32	10	8	14	47	49	−2	38
7	New Zealand	7	28	10	7	11	39	48	−11	37
8	South Korea	6	24	9	9	6	30	19	+11	36
9	Switzerland	7	28	9	5	14	40	49	−9	32
10	Republic of Ireland	4	16	6	5	5	17	13	+4	23
11	North Korea	2	8	6	1	1	14	3	+11	19
12	South Africa	6	24	5	4	15	17	38	−21	19
13	Mexico	2	8	5	3	0	15	4	+11	18
14	Finland	6	24	4	6	14	22	43	−21	18
15	Austria	3	12	5	2	5	14	11	+3	17
16	Czech Republic	4	16	5	2	9	20	31	−11	17
17	Belgium	3	12	3	6	3	16	15	+1	15
18	Australia	2	8	4	1	3	21	16	+5	13
19	Russia	3	12	4	1	7	16	20	−4	13
20	Wales	3	12	2	6	4	8	11	−3	11
21	Hungary	3	12	3	2	7	8	17	−9	11
21	Spain	1	4	3	1	0	6	0	+6	10
22	Japan	1	4	3	0	1	8	6	+2	9
24	Poland	1	4	2	1	1	4	3	+1	7
25	United States (U20)	1	4	2	0	2	6	6	0	6
26	Slovakia	1	4	0	2	2	3	7	−4	2
25	Northern Ireland	3	12	0	1	11	7	31	−24	1
