= Anna Westerlund =

Finnish footballer (born 1989)

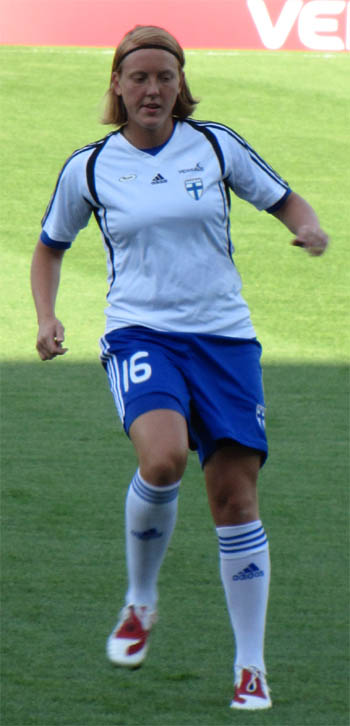
- Anna Westerlund in 2009

Personal information
- Full name: Anna Åsa Olivia Westerlund
- Date of birth: 9 April 1989 (age 37)
- Place of birth: Pargas, Finland
- Height: 1.73 m (5 ft 8 in)
- Positions: Centre back; defensive midfielder

Team information
- Current team: Åland United
- Number: 16

Youth career
- Pargas IF

Senior career*
Years	Team	Apps	(Gls)
2005	SC Raisio		
2006–2009	FC Honka		
2010–2011	Umeå IK	43	(6)
2012–2013	Piteå IF	40	(2)
2014–2018	LSK Kvinner FK	21	(3)
2019–2022	Åland United	84	(14)

International career^{‡}
2008–2022	Finland	137	(4)
- * Club domestic league appearances and goals as of 20 September 2023 (UTC) ‡ National team caps and goals as of 10 February 2022

Anna Åsa Olivia Westerlund (born 9 April 1989) is a Finnish former international footballer, who last played at club level for Åland United. She previously played for FC Honka in Finland's Naisten Liiga and Umeå IK. Despite playing 90 minutes in all 22 of Umeå's league matches, her contract with the club was not extended at the end of the 2011 season. The following season she remained in Sweden with Piteå IF.

== International career ==
Westerlund was part of the Finland squad at the 2006 FIFA U-20 Women's World Championship. Her senior Finland women's national football team debut came in January 2008, against China.

By the time of UEFA Women's Euro 2009, hosted by Finland, Westerlund was established in the squad. She played in three matches, including the 3–2 quarter-final defeat by England.

In June 2013 Westerlund was named in national coach Andrée Jeglertz's Finland squad for UEFA Women's Euro 2013. Typically a defensive midfielder with her club team, Westerlund was used as a centre back by Finland. She required a stitch in a head wound during Finland's opening match, a 0–0 draw with Italy.

== International goals ==
No.	Date	Venue	Opponent	Score	Result	Competition
1.	8 October 2019	Hietalahti Stadium, Vaasa, Finland	Albania	1–0	8–1	UEFA Women's Euro 2022 qualifying
2.	11 March 2020	GSZ Stadium, Larnaca, Cyprus	Slovakia	3–1	4–2	2020 Cyprus Women's Cup
