= Jennifer Muñoz (footballer, born 1996) =

American-born Mexican footballer (born 1996)

Personal information
- Full name: Jennifer Justine Muñoz Velázquez
- Date of birth: 4 November 1996 (age 30)
- Place of birth: Montebello, California, United States
- Height: 1.61 m (5 ft 3 in)
- Position: Midfielder

College career
Years	Team	Apps	(Gls)
2015–2018	New Mexico Lobos	77	(8)

Senior career*
Years	Team	Apps	(Gls)
2019–2021	América	45	(3)

International career^{‡}
2020	Mexico	2	(1)
- * Club domestic league appearances and goals as of 11 May 2021 ‡ National team caps and goals as of 11 March 2020

Jennifer Justine Muñoz Velázquez (born 4 November ) is a former professional footballer who played as a midfielder. Born in the United States, she played for the Mexico women's national team.

== International career ==
Muñoz made her senior debut for Mexico on 8 March 2020 in a 2–2 friendly draw against Slovakia and scored her first international goal in that match.
