= GSZ Stadium =

Stadium in Cyprus

GCZ Stadium
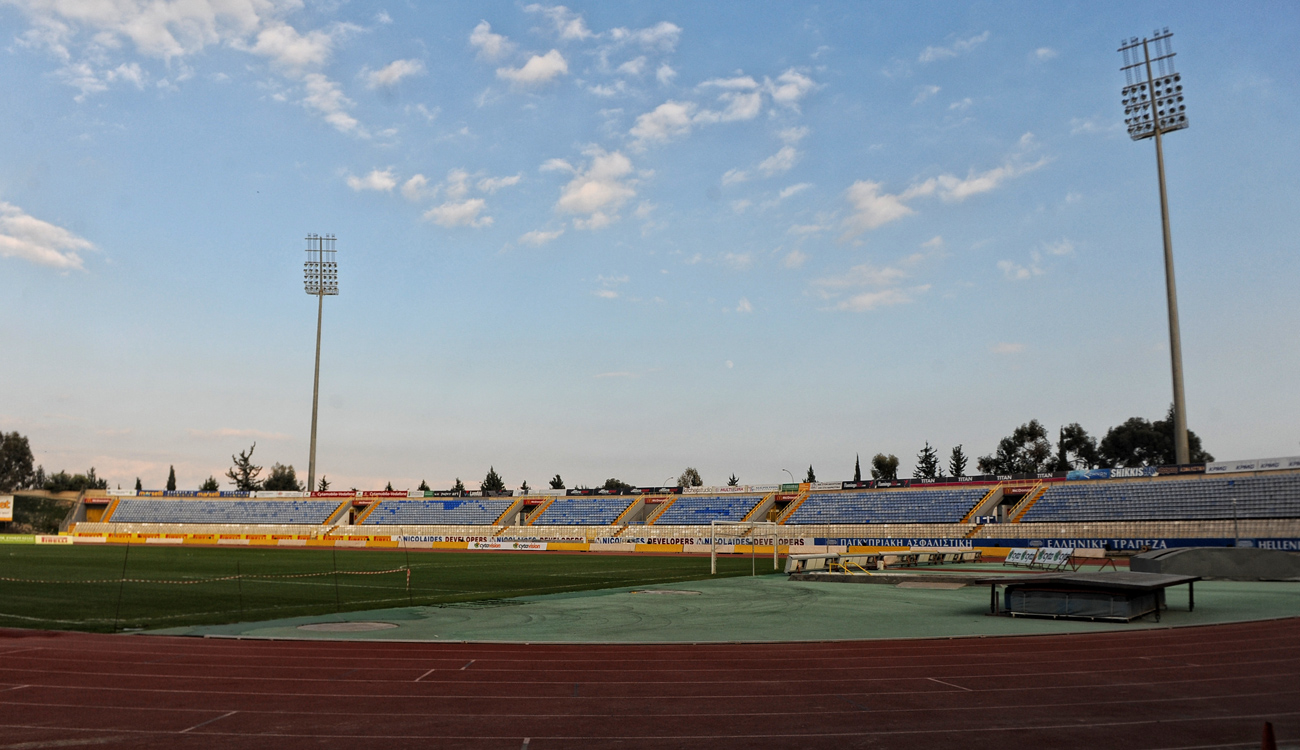
- Interactive map of GCZ Stadium
- Full name: Gymnastic Club Zenon Stadium
- Location: Larnaca, Cyprus
- Coordinates: 34.924566°N 33.599882°E
- Capacity: 13,032

Construction
- Built: 1982
- Opened: 1983

Tenants
- ASIL Lysi (2018-2019, 2021–); Ermis Aradippou FC (2017-2018); AEK Larnaca FC (1994-2016); Karmiotissa Pano Polemidion FC (2016-2017); EPA Larnaca (1983-1994); Pezoporicos Larnaca (1983-1994); Alki Larnaca (1983-2007, 2009-2010, 2011-2014); Nea Salamis Famagusta (1983-1991); Anorthosis Famagusta FC (1983-1986)

GCZ Stadium or Gymnastic Club Zenon Stadium (Greek: Γυμναστικός Σύλλογος Ζήνων; Γ.Σ.Ζ., Greek pronunciation: [ɣasiˈzi]) is a multi-purpose stadium in Larnaca, Cyprus. Usually it is referred to as the 'neo GSZ Stadium' to distinguish it from the old GSZ Stadium, which it replaced. It is currently used mostly for football matches and was the home ground of AEK Larnaca FC until 2016. The stadium holds 13,032 people. Its owner is the Gymnastic Club Zeno, which was named after the native philosopher of Larnaca Zeno of Citium. Before the merge of Pezoporikos and EPA Larnaca into the new football club AEK Larnaca FC, it was also the home of those two clubs.

In 2006 it hosted the Cypriot Cup final between APOEL and AEK Larnaca FC, where APOEL won 3–2. However the greatest event that was hosted in the Larnaca Stadium was the final for the 1998 UEFA European Under-18 Football Championship between the Republic of Ireland and Germany where they tied 1-1. The Republic of Ireland beat Germany 4–3 on penalties and won the trophy. During the same day, the Third Position final playoff was played for the same tournament and in that match Portugal beat Croatia 5–4 on penalties as well while the match ended 0-0.
