= AEK Arena – Georgios Karapatakis =

Football stadium in Aradippou, Cyprus

AEK Arena
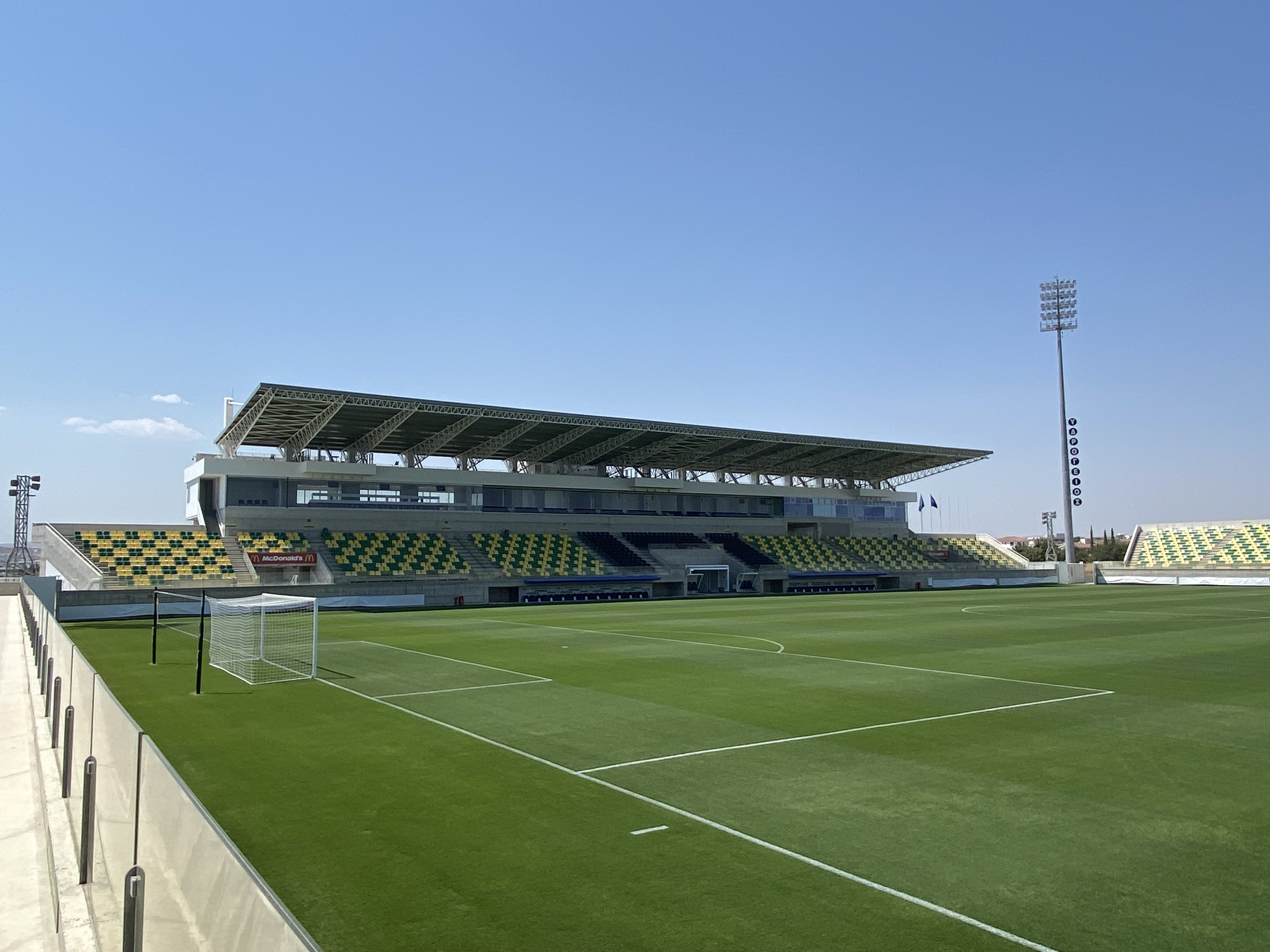
- UEFA
- Interactive map of AEK Arena
- Full name: AEK Arena – Georgios Karapatakis
- Location: Larnaca, Cyprus
- Coordinates: 34°55′35″N 33°35′52″E
- Owner: AEK Larnaca
- Operator: AEK Larnaca
- Capacity: 8,058
- Surface: Natural Grass
- Scoreboard: Yes
- Field size: 105 m × 68 m (344 ft × 223 ft)

Construction
- Groundbreaking: 2016
- Built: 2015–2016
- Opened: 17 October 2016; 10 years ago
- Cost: €8,500,000
- General contractor: ZEMCO GROUP
- Main contractor: ZEMCO GROUP

Tenants
- AEK Larnaca FC (2016–); ASIL Lysi (2019–2021); Cyprus national football team (2021–); UEFA U-17 Championship (2024)

AEK Arena – Georgios Karapatakis (Greek: ΑΕΚ Αρένα – Γεώργιος Καραπατάκης) is a football stadium in Larnaca, Cyprus. Completed in 2016, it is the home ground of AEK Larnaca and has a total seating capacity of 8,058. Since 2021, it also hosts the home games of the Cyprus national team.

== Name ==
The stadium's official name is "AEK Arena – George Karapatakis", in honor of the father of the President of AEK, Mr Andros Karapatakis.

== History ==
AEK Arena was built on land owned by the GSZ Stadium. AEK Larnaca and GSZ have agreed to build a stadium on this land. The stadium is owned by AEK Larnaca, and was built by its own cost. The responsibility of the construction was assigned to Balltown Holdings (Public) Ltd, which was founded for this purpose by AEK.

The construction of the stadium was planned to be done in two phases. The first phase began on 7 September 2015. Initially, only 3 of the 4 stands would be built. However, in the course of the implementation of the project, a mandate was given to build the fourth stand.

The stadium was inaugurated on Monday 17 October 2016 with the match between AEK and Aris for the 7th matchday of the 2016–17 Cypriot First Division. AEK won the match with 4–0 score. The first goal which achieved in AEK Arena was scored by Jorge Larena. The official inauguration took place on 27 November 2016.

The first match of European competition was held on 29 June 2017 for the first qualifying round of Europa League 2017–18, when ΑΕΚ faced Lincoln Red Imps F.C. AEK won the match with 5–0 score.

== Funding ==
The cost of building the stadium:

1) €7 million for the first phase

2) €3 million for the second phase

== Categorisation ==
Since September 2022, AEK Arena is classified as a UEFA Category 4 stadium.

== Educational Program ==
Since 2017, the stadium has hosted the first educational program ever implemented in a stadium in Cyprus. The educational program “Stadium Tour” is an innovative initiative that includes activities from various subject areas, fostering learning objectives of Primary Education. All activities are aligned with the achievement and competency indicators of the National Curriculum and have the official approval of the Ministry of Education of Cyprus. The program is offered free of charge to all students of public and private Primary Schools (Grades 3–6).

The main questions the program addresses are: “What is a stadium like from the inside?” and “What is it like to have a lesson inside a football stadium?” Beyond an in-depth familiarization with the stadium, the program aims to provide a comprehensive learning experience which, through experiential activities, meets various educational objectives of the official school curriculum. Children are guided through all areas of the stadium (locker rooms, pitch, stands, press conference room, media boxes, etc.), while simultaneously engaging in targeted experiential exercises (Greek Language, Mathematics, Geography, History, Physical Education, Life Education) under the guidance and support of the program’s educators.
