= 2011 FIFA Women's World Cup qualification – UEFA Group 2 =

Football tournament qualification stage

The 2011 FIFA Women's World Cup qualification UEFA Group 2 was a UEFA qualifying group for the 2011 FIFA Women's World Cup. The group comprised Norway, the Netherlands, Macedonia, Belarus and Slovakia.

Norway won the group and advanced to the play-off rounds.

== Standings ==
Team	Pld	W	D	L	GF	GA	GD	Pts	Norway	Netherlands	Belarus	Slovakia	North Macedonia
Norway	8	7	1	0	39	2	+37	22	—	3–0	3–0	1–0	14–0
Netherlands	8	5	2	1	30	7	+23	17	2–2	—	1–1	2–0	13–1
Belarus	8	4	1	3	17	14	+3	13	0–5	0–4	—	2–0	6–0
Slovakia	8	2	0	6	15	13	+2	6	0–4	0–1	0–2	—	9–0
Macedonia	8	0	0	8	3	68	−65	0	0–7	0–7	1–6	1–6	—

- Norway win Group 2 and advance to the UEFA play-off rounds.

== Results ==
19 September 2009
15:00 UTC+2

Slovakia	9–0	Macedonia
Budošová 9'; Fecková 31', 42', 65', 70', 73'; Klechová 36', 39' (pen.); Ondrušová 55'	Report

NTC Stadion, Senec
Referee: Floarea Babadac-Ionescu (Romania)

24 October 2009
15:00 UTC+2

Norway	3–0	Netherlands
Rønning 44' (pen.); Gulbrandsen 45+1'; Herlovsen 87'	Report

Nadderud stadion, Bærum
Referee: Cristina Dorcioman (Romania)

25 October 2009
13:00 UTC+1

Macedonia	1–6	Belarus
Spirovska 51'	Report	Lis 3'; Aukhimovich 5', 65'; Vasilyeva 12'; Krylowa 90+1' (pen.); Pilipenko 90+3'

Gradski Stadion, Kumanovo
Referee: Karolina Radzik-Johan (Poland)

28 October 2009
18:00 UTC+1

Norway	1–0	Slovakia
Bíróová 51' (o.g.)	Report

Skagerak Arena, Skien
Referee: Amy Rayner (England)

29 October 2009
19:30 UTC+1

Netherlands	13–1	Macedonia
Kiesel-Griffioen 9', 36', 67', 78'; Smit 11', 38', 41', 83', 87', 90+2'; Melis 30'; Koster 53'; Spitse 62'	Report	Salihi 74'

MAC³PARK Stadion, Zwolle
Referee: Dagmar Damková (Czech Republic)

21 November 2009
19:00 UTC+1

Netherlands	1–1	Belarus
Slegers 22'	Report	Aukhimovich 63'

Den Haag Stadion, The Hague
Referee: Silvia Tea Spinelli (Italy)

27 March 2010
14:00 UTC+1

Norway	14–0	Macedonia
Herlovsen 1', 16', 17', 41', 74', 81'; Rønning 13'; Stensland 21'; Mykjåland 25', 90+1'; Klaveness 26'; Pedersen 71'; Woods 80', 90+3'	Report

AKA Arena, Hønefoss
Referee: Dilan Gökçek (Turkey)

27 March 2010
19:00 UTC+1

Netherlands	2–0	Slovakia
Smit 16' (pen.); Koster 78'	Report

Polman Stadion, Almelo
Referee: Aneliya Sinabova (Bulgaria)

30 March 2010
17:30 UTC+3

Belarus	0–5	Norway
	Report	Giske 24'; Klaveness 33'; Herlovsen 57'; Mykjåland 64'; Gulbrandsen 74'

Neman Stadium, Grodno
Referee: Anja Kunick (Germany)

1 April 2010
13:00 UTC+2

Slovakia	0–1	Netherlands
	Report	Kiesel-Griffioen 90+2'

NTC Stadion, Senec
Referee: Yuliya Medvedeva-Keldyusheva (Kazakhstan)

22 April 2010
16:00 UTC+2

Macedonia	0–7	Netherlands
	Report	Hoogendijk 2'; Pieëte 4'; Smit 7'; Meulen 21'; Melis 23' de Ridder 44'; Slegers 84'

Milano Arena, Kumanovo
Referee: Donka Zheleva-Terzieva (Bulgaria)

28 April 2010
17:00 UTC+3

Belarus	6–0	Macedonia
Lis 18', 20', 66'; Shramok 53'; Nikolaeva 77'; Buzinova 81'	Report

City Stadium, Molodechno
Referee: Laurence Zeien (Luxembourg)

19 June 2010
17:30 UTC+2

Slovakia	0–2	Belarus
	Report	Aukhimovich 22'; Krylova 40'

Štadión FC ViOn, Zlaté Moravce
Referee: Betina Norman (Denmark)

19 June 2010
18:00 UTC+2

Netherlands	2–2	Norway
Melis 2'; Dekker 80'	Report	Herlovsen 5'; Vikestad 48'

MAC³PARK Stadion, Zwolle
Referee: Gyöngyi Krisztina Gaál (Hungary)

23 June 2010
17:00 UTC+2

Macedonia	1–6	Slovakia
Andonova 90'	Report	Klechová 11'; Fecková 45+2'; Budošová 57'; Haršányová 61', 70'; Kolenová 63'

Goce Delčev Stadium, Prilep
Referee: Elia María Martínez Martínez (Spain)

23 June 2010
18:00 UTC+2

Norway	3–0	Belarus
Klaveness 11'; Woods 64'; Haavi 88'	Report

Skagerak Arena, Skien
Referee: Claudine Brohet (Belgium)

21 August 2010
16:00 UTC+2

Slovakia	0–4	Norway
	Report	Rønning 22' (pen.); Gulbrandsen 28'; Woods 34'; Korenčiová 78' (o.g.)

NTC Stadion, Senec
Referee: Esther Staubli (Switzerland)

21 August 2010
18:00 UTC+3

Belarus	0–4	Netherlands
	Report	van de Ven 21'; Melis 55', 60' de Ridder 70'

City Stadium, Molodechno
Referee: Efthalia Mitsi (Greece)

25 August 2010
18:00 UTC+3

Belarus	2–0	Slovakia
Urazaeva 66'; Lis 79'	Report

City Stadium, Molodechno
Referee: Esther Azzopardi (Malta)

25 August 2010
17:00 UTC+2

Macedonia	0–7	Norway
	Report	Haavi 25', 68'; Woods 28'; Stensland 36'; Thorsnes 43'; Gulbrandsen 73'; Rønning 78'

Goce Delčev Stadium, Prilep
Referee: Caroline De Boeck (Belgium)

== Goalscorers ==
9 goals

- (Norway) Isabell Herlovsen

8 goals

- (Netherlands) Sylvia Smit

6 goals

- (Slovakia) Dana Fecková

5 goals

- (Belarus) Marina Lis
- (Netherlands) Annemieke Kiesel-Griffioen
- (Netherlands) Manon Melis
- (Norway) Lisa-Marie Woods

4 goals

- (Norway) Solveig Gulbrandsen
- (Norway) Trine Bjerke Rønning

3 goals

- (Belarus) Yekaterina Aukhimovich
- (Norway) Emilie Haavi
- (Norway) Lene Mykjåland
- (Norway) Lise Klaveness
- (Slovakia) Veronika Klechová

2 goals

- (Belarus) Viktoria Krylova
- (Netherlands) Chantal de Ridder
- (Netherlands) Daphne Koster
- (Netherlands) Renée Slegers
- (Norway) Ingvild Stensland
- (Slovakia) Andrea Budošová
- (Slovakia) Lucia Haršányová

1 goal

- (Belarus) Alena Buzinova
- (Belarus) Alina Vasilyeva
- (Belarus) Ekaterina Aukhimovich
- (Belarus) Elvira Urazaeva
- (Belarus) Anna Pilipenko
- (Belarus) Irina Nikolaeva
- (Belarus) Tatyana Shramok
- (North Macedonia) Afrodita Saliihi
- (North Macedonia) Natasa Andonova
- (North Macedonia) Violeta Spirovska
- (Netherlands) Anouk Dekker
- (Netherlands) Anouk Hoogendijk
- (Netherlands) Kirsten van de Ven
- (Netherlands) Manoe Meulen
- (Netherlands) Marlous Pieëte
- (Netherlands) Sherida Spitse
- (Norway) Anneli Giske
- (Norway) Cecilie Pedersen
- (Norway) Elise Thorsnes
- (Norway) Runa Vikestad
- (Slovakia) Eva Kolenová
- (Slovakia) Lucia Ondrušová

Own goals

- (Slovakia) Alexandra Bíróová
- (Slovakia) Maria Korenciová
