= 2011 FIFA Women's World Cup qualification – UEFA Group 1 =

Football tournament qualification stage

The 2011 FIFA Women's World Cup qualification UEFA Group 1 was a UEFA qualifying group for the 2011 FIFA Women's World Cup. The group comprised France, Iceland, Serbia, Northern Ireland, Croatia and Estonia. It was the only six-team group (the other seven having only five teams each).

The group was won by France who advanced to the play-off rounds.

== Standings ==
| Team | Pld | W | D | L | GF | GA | GD | Pts | France | Iceland | | Estonia | Serbia | Croatia |
|---|---|---|---|---|---|---|---|---|---|---|---|---|---|---|
| France | 10 | 10 | 0 | 0 | 50 | 0 | +50 | 30 | — | 2–0 | 6–0 | 12–0 | 7–0 | 3–0 |
| Iceland | 10 | 8 | 0 | 2 | 33 | 3 | +30 | 24 | 0–1 | — | 2–0 | 12–0 | 5–0 | 3–0 |
| Northern Ireland | 10 | 3 | 2 | 5 | 8 | 16 | −8 | 11 | 0–4 | 0–1 | — | 3–0 | 0–0 | 3–1 |
| Estonia | 10 | 3 | 1 | 6 | 7 | 44 | −37 | 10 | 0–6 | 0–5 | 2–1 | — | 1–0 | 1–1 |
| Serbia | 10 | 2 | 3 | 5 | 7 | 19 | −12 | 9 | 0–2 | 0–2 | 0–0 | 4–0 | — | 1–1 |
| Croatia | 10 | 0 | 2 | 8 | 4 | 27 | −23 | 2 | 0–7 | 0–3 | 0–1 | 0–3 | 1–2 | — |

== Results ==
15 August 2009
14:00 UTC±0

| Iceland | 5–0 | Serbia |
|---|---|---|
| M. Viðarsdóttir 32', 49', 72', 84'; K. Jónsdóttir 80' | Report |

Laugardalsvöllur, Reykjavík
Attendance: 4,154
Referee: Tanja Schett (Austria)

17 September 2009
20:00 UTC±0

| Iceland | 12–0 | Estonia |
|---|---|---|
| M. Viðarsdóttir 4', 9' (pen.), 38'; Lárusdóttir 7'; K. Jónsdóttir 16', 18'; Garðarsdóttir 33'; Magnúsdóttir 49', 64', 74'; S. Gunnarsdóttir 54'; Hönnudóttir 76' | Report |

Laugardalsvöllur, Reykjavík
Referee: Hilda McDermott (Republic of Ireland)

23 September 2009
16:00 UTC+2

| Croatia | 0–7 | France |
|---|---|---|
| | Report | Soubeyrand 25'; Franco 38', 55'; Delie 45+2'; Le Sommer 65'; Abily 73'; Thomis 90+3' |

Stadion NK Inter Zaprešić, Zaprešić
Referee: Yuliya Medvedeva-Keldyusheva (Kazakhstan)

26 September 2009
16:00 UTC+2

| Serbia | 1–1 | Croatia |
|---|---|---|
| Pešić 54' | Report | Joščak 22' |

Mašinac Stadium, Niš
Referee: Lena Arwedahl (Sweden)

24 October 2009
15:30 UTC+2

| Croatia | 0–1 | Northern Ireland |
|---|---|---|
| | Report | Furness 26' |

Stadion NK Inter Zaprešić, Zaprešić
Referee: Jana Adámková (Czech Republic)
24 October 2009
16:30 UTC+2

| France | 2–0 | Iceland |
|---|---|---|
| Thiney 23'; Thomis 79' | Report |

Stade de Gerland, Lyon
Referee: Christine Beck (Germany)

28 October 2009
18:00 UTC+1

| France | 12–0 | Estonia |
|---|---|---|
| Herbert 27', 57'; Necib 31'; Abily 36'; Thiney 37', 41', 47'; Franco 40'; Thomis 79'; Delie 80', 90+1'; Prants 90+4' (o.g.) | Report |

Stade Jules Deschaseaux, Le Havre
Referee: Christina Westrum Pedersen (Norway)
28 October 2009
19:30 UTC±0

| Northern Ireland | 0–1 | Iceland |
|---|---|---|
| | Report | Ómarsdóttir 79' |

The Oval, Belfast
Referee: Sandra Braz Bastos (Portugal)

21 November 2009
13:00 UTC+1

| Serbia | 0–2 | France |
|---|---|---|
| | Report | Thiney 27'; Abily 45+3' |

Stadion FK Inđija, Inđija
Referee: Teodora Albon (Romania)

27 March 2010
15:00 UTC+1

| Serbia | 0–2 | Iceland |
|---|---|---|
| | Report | Magnúsdóttir 52', 81' |

Mirko Vučurević Stadium, Banatski Dvor
Referee: Claudine Brohet (Belgium)
27 March 2010
15:30 UTC+1

| Croatia | 0–3 | Estonia |
|---|---|---|
| | Report | Aarna 10', 84'; Morkovkina 33' |

Gradski Stadion kraj Sajmišta, Vrbovec
Referee: Venera Muradova-Kahrich (Azerbaijan)
27 March 2010
16:30 UTC+1

| France | 6–0 | Northern Ireland |
|---|---|---|
| Franco 31'; Bompastor 34'; Le Sommer 47'; Delie 50'; Necib 54'; Hutton 71' (o.g.) | Report |

Stade de la Libération, Boulogne-sur-Mer
Referee: Silvia Tea Spinelli (Italy)

31 March 2010
15:00 UTC+2

| Serbia | 4–0 | Estonia |
|---|---|---|
| Damnjanović 14'; Sretenović 54'; Stojkanović 73'; Podovac 89' | Report |

Mirko Vučurević Stadium, Banatski Dvor
Referee: Alessia Lazzaretto (Italy)
31 March 2010
15:30 UTC+2

| Croatia | 0–3 | Iceland |
|---|---|---|
| | Report | K. Jónsdóttir 3'; M. Viðarsdóttir 37'; Logadóttir 84' |

Gradski Stadion kraj Sajmišta, Vrbovec
Referee: Marina Mamayeva (Russia)
31 March 2010
19:45 UTC+1

| Northern Ireland | 0–4 | France |
|---|---|---|
| | Report | Bompastor 17'; Abily 19'; Le Sommer 52'; Delie 90' |

Windsor Park, Belfast
Referee: Paloma Quintero Siles (Spain)

9 May 2010
17:00 UTC+2

| Croatia | 1–2 | Serbia |
|---|---|---|
| Bokanović 39' | Report | Damnjanović 13'; Krstić 54' |

Gradski Stadion kraj Sajmišta, Vrbovec
Referee: Morag Pirie (Scotland)

5 June 2010
14:00 UTC+3

| Estonia | 2–1 | Northern Ireland |
|---|---|---|
| Morkovkina 15'; Palmaru 30' | Report | Hurst 59' |

Kadrioru Stadium, Tallinn
Referee: Olga Tanschi (Moldova)

19 June 2010
14:00 UTC+3

| Estonia | 1–0 | Serbia |
|---|---|---|
| Paulus 61' | Report |

Rakvere Linnastaadion, Rakvere
Referee: Dilan Gökçek (Turkey)
19 June 2010
16:00 UTC±0

| Iceland | 2–0 | Northern Ireland |
|---|---|---|
| S. Gunnarsdóttir 15'; K. Jónsdóttir 59' | Report |

Laugardalsvöllur, Reykjavík
Referee: Efthalia Mitsi (Greece)

20 June 2010
17:45 UTC+2

| France | 3–0 | Croatia |
|---|---|---|
| Thiney 22'; Le Sommer 57'; Delie 62' | Report |

Stade Léo Lagrange, Besançon
Referee: Cristina Dorcioman (Romania)

22 June 2010
20:00 UTC±0

| Iceland | 3–0 | Croatia |
|---|---|---|
| Magnúsdóttir 20', 42'; K. Jónsdóttir 75' | Report |

Laugardalsvöllur, Reykjavík
Referee: Esther Staubli (Switzerland)

23 June 2010
14:00 UTC+3

| Estonia | 0–6 | France |
|---|---|---|
| | Report | Thiney 21'; Thomis 53'; Bussaglia 54'; Le Sommer 60'; Delie 61', 90' |

Kadrioru Stadium, Tallinn
Referee: Sjoukje De Jong (Netherlands)
23 June 2010
19:45 UTC+1

| Northern Ireland | 0–0 | Serbia |
|---|---|---|
| | Report |

The Showgrounds, Coleraine
Referee: Carina Susanna Vitulano (Italy)

24 July 2010
15:00 UTC+1

| Northern Ireland | 3–0 | Estonia |
|---|---|---|
| McKenna 53', 62'; Nelson 69' | Report |

The Showgrounds, Coleraine
Referee: Lilach Asulin (Israel)

21 August 2010
17:00 UTC+2

| Serbia | 0–0 | Northern Ireland |
|---|---|---|
| | Report |

Vašarište, Požarevac
Referee: Petra Chudá (Slovakia)
21 August 2010
16:00 UTC±0

| Iceland | 0–1 | France |
|---|---|---|
| | Report | Thiney 60' |

Laugardalsvöllur, Reykjavík
Referee: Bibiana Steinhaus (Germany)

22 August 2010
16:00 UTC+3

| Estonia | 1–1 | Croatia |
|---|---|---|
| Palmaru 16' | Report | Lojna 81' |

A. Le Coq Arena, Tallinn
Referee: Karolina Radzik-Johan (Poland)

25 August 2010
18:00 UTC+3

| Estonia | 0–5 | Iceland |
|---|---|---|
| | Report | M. Viðarsdóttir 9', 17'; S. Gunnarsdóttir 56', 86'; Morkovkina 58' (o.g.) |

Rakvere Linnastaadion, Rakvere
Referee: Floarea Babadac-Ionescu (Romania)
25 August 2010
20:45 UTC+2

| France | 7–0 | Serbia |
|---|---|---|
| Thomis 5'; Thiney 32', 63', 87'; Bussaglia 45'; Delie 60'; Abily 79' | Report |

Stade de l'Aube, Troyes
Referee: Natalia Avdonchenko (Russia)
25 August 2010
19:45 UTC+1

| Northern Ireland | 3–1 | Croatia |
|---|---|---|
| Furness 1', 51', 59' | Report | Landeka 50' |

The Oval, Belfast
Referee: Ausra Kance (Lithuania)

== Goalscorers ==
There were 109 goals scored over 30 matches by 40 players, 2 of them own goals. The goal average was 3.63 goals/gm.

| Pos | Player | Country | Goals |
|---|---|---|---|
| 1 | Gaëtane Thiney | France | 11 |
| 2 | Margrét Lára Viðarsdóttir | Iceland | 10 |
| 3 | Marie-Laure Delie | France | 9 |
| 4 | Hólmfríður Magnúsdóttir | Iceland | 7 |
| 5 | Katrín Jónsdóttir | Iceland | 6 |
| 6 | Camille Abily | France | 5 |
| 6 | Eugenie Le Sommer | France | 5 |
| 6 | Élodie Thomis | France | 5 |
| 9 | Rachel Furness | Northern Ireland | 4 |
| 9 | Sara Björk Gunnarsdóttir | Iceland | 4 |

2 goals

- (Estonia) Signy Aarna
- (France) Sonia Bompastor
- (France) Élise Bussaglia
- (Serbia) Jovana Damnjanović
- (France) Candie Herbert
- (France) Louisa Necib
- (Northern Ireland) Helen McKenna
- (Estonia) Anastassia Morkovkina
- (Estonia) Kaire Palmaru

1 goal

- (Croatia) Josipa Bokanović
- (Iceland) Edda Garðarsdóttir
- (Iceland) Rakel Hönnudóttir
- (Northern Ireland) Alexandra Hurst
- (Croatia) Maja Joščak
- (Serbia) Kristina Krstić
- (Croatia) Iva Landeka
- (Iceland) Dóra María Lárusdóttir
- (Croatia) Izabela Lojna
- (Iceland) Rakel Logadóttir
- (Northern Ireland) Julie Nelson
- (Iceland) Katrín Ómarsdóttir
- (Estonia) Anete Paulus
- (Serbia) Milena Pešić
- (Serbia) Danka Podovac
- (France) Sandrine Soubeyrand
- (Serbia) Jovana Sretenović
- (Serbia) Lidija Stojkanović

Own goals

- (Estonia) Geit Prants (for France)
- (Estonia) Anastassia Morkovkina (for Iceland)
- (Northern Ireland) Ashley Hutton (for France)
