= 2011 FIFA Women's World Cup qualification (UEFA) =

Football tournament qualification stage

In the UEFA qualification for 2011 FIFA Women's World Cup, 41 entrants were drawn into eight groups, from which the group winners advanced to a play-off round. The four winners of the play-off round advanced directly to join Germany (the hosts) in the finals tournament, while the four play-off losers played two further knock-out rounds to determine a nation to play-off with the third-placed CONCACAF nation for a finals place.

This scheme was a significant change from previous editions of qualification as all entrants had the ability to advance to the final tournament. In previous years only those nations belonging to the First Category of European women's football were able to qualify, with a system approximating promotion and relegation between qualification tournaments operating.

== Qualifying round ==
The groups were drawn on 17 March 2009, with the matches held from 15 August 2009 to 25 August 2010. The eight group winners advanced to the play-off stages.

=== Seeding ===
Seeding was based on results in 2007 FIFA Women's World Cup and UEFA Women's Euro 2009 qualifying. There were five seeding pots, each containing eight teams except for the fifth, Pot E, which had nine and provided two nations for Group 1.

Pot A	Pot B	Pot C	Pot D	Pot E
**Sweden**; **Norway**; Denmark; **England**; **France**; Russia; Ukraine; Italy	Finland; Iceland; Spain; Czech Republic; Netherlands; Scotland; Republic of Ireland; Poland	Switzerland; Austria; Serbia; Belarus; Belgium; Greece; Portugal; Hungary	Slovenia; Slovakia; Israel; Wales; Romania; Northern Ireland; Turkey; Bulgaria	Croatia; Armenia; Bosnia and Herzegovina; Kazakhstan; Azerbaijan; Estonia; Malta; Macedonia; Georgia

We report in bold the teams which actually qualified to the 2011 FIFA Women's World Cup.

=== Group 1 ===
Team	Pld	W	D	L	GF	GA	GD	Pts	France	Iceland		Estonia	Serbia	Croatia
France	10	10	0	0	50	0	+50	30	—	2–0	6–0	12–0	7–0	3–0
Iceland	10	8	0	2	33	3	+30	24	0–1	—	2–0	12–0	5–0	3–0
Northern Ireland	10	3	2	5	8	16	−8	11	0–4	0–1	—	3–0	0–0	3–1
Estonia	10	3	1	6	7	44	−37	10	0–6	0–5	2–1	—	1–0	1–1
Serbia	10	2	3	5	7	19	−12	9	0–2	0–2	0–0	4–0	—	1–1
Croatia	10	0	2	8	4	27	−23	2	0–7	0–3	0–1	0–3	1–2	—

=== Group 2 ===
Team	Pld	W	D	L	GF	GA	GD	Pts	Norway	Netherlands	Belarus	Slovakia	North Macedonia
Norway	8	7	1	0	39	2	+37	**22**	—	3–0	3–0	1–0	14–0
Netherlands	8	5	2	1	30	7	+23	**17**	2–2	—	1–1	2–0	13–1
Belarus	8	4	1	3	17	14	+3	**13**	0–5	0–4	—	2–0	6–0
Slovakia	8	2	0	6	15	13	+2	**6**	0–4	0–1	0–2	—	9–0
Macedonia	8	0	0	8	3	68	−65	**0**	0–7	0–7	1–6	1–6	—

=== Group 3 ===
Team	Pld	W	D	L	GF	GA	GD	Pts	Denmark	Scotland	Greece	Bulgaria	Georgia
Denmark	8	6	2	0	45	0	+45	**20**	—	0–0	7–0	9–0	15–0
Scotland	8	6	1	1	24	5	+19	**19**	0–1	—	4–1	8–1	3–1
Greece	8	3	0	5	11	20	−9	**9**	0–6	0–1	—	1–2	5–0
Bulgaria	8	2	2	4	9	25	−16	**8**	0–0	0–5	0–1	—	5–0
Georgia	8	0	1	7	3	42	−39	**1**	0–7	1–3	0–3	1–1	—

=== Group 4 ===
Team	Pld	W	D	L	GF	GA	GD	Pts	Ukraine	Poland	Hungary	Romania	Bosnia and Herzegovina
Ukraine	8	5	2	1	24	9	+15	**17**	—	3–1	4–2	3–1	7–0
Poland	8	5	1	2	18	9	+9	**16**	4–1	—	0–0	2–0	1–0
Hungary	8	4	3	1	15	10	+5	**15**	1–1	4–2	—	1–1	2–0
Romania	8	2	2	4	14	13	+1	**8**	0–0	1–4	2–3	—	4–0
Bosnia and Herzegovina	8	0	0	8	0	30	−30	**0**	0–5	0–4	0–2	0–5	—

=== Group 5 ===
Team	Pld	W	D	L	GF	GA	GD	Pts	England	Spain	Austria	Turkey	Malta
England	8	7	1	0	30	2	+28	**22**	—	1–0	3–0	3–0	8–0
Spain	8	6	1	1	37	4	+33	**19**	2–2	—	2–0	5–1	9–0
Austria	8	3	1	4	14	12	+2	**10**	0–4	0–1	—	4–0	6–0
Turkey	8	2	1	5	10	23	−13	**7**	0–3	0–5	2–2	—	5–1
Malta	8	0	0	8	1	51	−50	**0**	0–6	0–13	0–2	0–2	—

=== Group 6 ===
Team	Pld	W	D	L	GF	GA	GD	Pts	Switzerland	Russia	Ireland	Israel	Kazakhstan
Switzerland	8	7	0	1	28	6	+22	**21**	—	1–2	2–0	6–0	8–0
Russia	8	6	1	1	30	6	+24	**19**	0–3	—	3–0	4–0	8–0
Republic of Ireland	8	4	1	3	12	10	+2	**13**	1–2	1–1	—	3–0	2–1
Israel	8	2	0	6	4	24	−20	**6**	1–2	1–6	0–3	—	1–0
Kazakhstan	8	0	0	8	4	32	−28	**0**	2–4	0–6	1–2	0–1	—

=== Group 7 ===
Team	Pld	W	D	L	GF	GA	GD	Pts	Italy	Finland	Portugal	Slovenia	Armenia
Italy	8	7	1	0	38	3	+35	**22**	—	1–1	2–0	6–0	7–0
Finland	8	6	1	1	25	6	+19	**19**	1–3	—	4–1	4–1	7–0
Portugal	8	4	0	4	17	10	+7	**12**	1–3	0–1	—	1–0	7–0
Slovenia	8	2	0	6	7	27	−20	**6**	0–8	0–3	0–4	—	1–0
Armenia	8	0	0	8	1	42	−41	**0**	0–8	0–4	0–3	1–5	—

=== Group 8 ===
Team	Pld	W	D	L	GF	GA	GD	Pts	Sweden	Czech Republic	Belgium	Wales	Azerbaijan
Sweden	8	7	1	0	36	3	+33	**22**	—	0–0	2–1	5–1	17–0
Czech Republic	8	4	1	3	19	6	+13	**13**	0–1	—	1–2	2–1	8–0
Belgium	8	3	1	4	18	13	+5	**10**	1–4	0–3	—	2–3	11–0
Wales	8	3	0	5	23	16	+7	**9**	0–4	2–0	0–1	—	15–0
Azerbaijan	8	1	1	6	2	60	−58	**4**	0–3	0–5	0–0	2–1	—

== Play-off stages ==
=== Seeding ===
The eight UEFA qualification group winners qualified for the play-offs. The play-off draw was seeded according to results in this qualifying competition and those for UEFA Women's EURO 2009.

Legend
Seeded teams
Unseeded teams

Group	Team	Seeding coefficient
8	Sweden	2.875
1	France	2.833
2	Norway	2.750
5	England	2.625
3	Denmark	2.563
7	Italy	2.500
4	Ukraine	2.250
6	Switzerland	2.000

=== Direct qualification ===
Each seeded team was drawn against an unseeded opponent to play a two-legged tie. The four winners advanced to the finals in Germany. The four losers advanced to the repechage rounds for a chance to qualify against a CONCACAF opponent.

Ties were drawn on 30 August with the first legs scheduled for 11–12 September and the return legs on 15–16 September.

Team 1	Agg.	Team 2	1st leg	2nd leg
France	3–2	Italy	0–0	3–2
England	5–2	Switzerland	2–0	3–2
Ukraine	0–3	Norway	0–1	0–2
Sweden	4–3	Denmark	2–1	2–2

=== Repechage I ===
The four losers from the direct qualification play-offs met in two sets of two-legged ties on 2 and 6 October. The winners advanced to the second repechage round.

Team 1	Agg.	Team 2	1st leg	2nd leg
Denmark	1–3	Switzerland	1–3	0–0
Ukraine	0–3	Italy	0–3	0–0

=== Repechage II ===
The two winners from the first repechage round met in a two-legged tie on 23 and 27 October. The winner advanced to play the third-placed team from the CONCACAF qualification for a spot in the 2011 FIFA Women's World Cup finals.

Team 1	Agg.	Team 2	1st leg	2nd leg
Italy	5–2	Switzerland	1–0	4–2

Italy won 5–2 on aggregate and advanced to the UEFA-CONCACAF play-off.

== References and notes ==
- UEFA Site
