= UEFA Women's Euro 2017 qualifying Group 4 =

Football tournament qualification stage

Group 4 of the UEFA Women's Euro 2017 qualifying competition consisted of five teams: Sweden, Denmark, Poland, Slovakia, and Moldova. The composition of the eight groups in the qualifying group stage was decided by the draw held on 20 April 2015.

The group was played in home-and-away round-robin format. The group winners qualified directly for the final tournament, while the runners-up also qualified directly if they were one of the six best runners-up among all eight groups (not counting results against the fifth-placed team); otherwise, the runners-up advance to the play-offs.

== Standings ==
Pos	Team	Pld	W	D	L	GF	GA	GD	Pts	Qualification	Sweden	Denmark	Poland	Slovakia	Moldova
1	Sweden	8	7	0	1	22	3	+19	21	Final tournament	—	1–0	3–0	2–1	6–0
2	Denmark	8	6	1	1	22	1	+21	19	Final tournament	2–0	—	6–0	4–0	4–0
3	Poland	8	3	1	4	10	16	−6	10		0–4	0–0	—	2–0	4–0
4	Slovakia	8	3	0	5	11	13	−2	9		0–3	0–1	2–1	—	4–0
5	Moldova	8	0	0	8	1	33	−32	0		0–3	0–5	1–3	0–4	—

Source: UEFA
Rules for classification: Qualification tiebreakers

== Matches ==
Times are CEST (UTC+2) for dates between 29 March and 24 October 2015 and between 27 March and 29 October 2016, for other dates times are CET (UTC+1).

17 September 2015
15:00

Moldova	0–3	Sweden
	Report	Schough 1'; Schelin 42' (pen.); Hammarlund 88'

CSR Orhei, Orhei
Attendance: 350
Referee: Riem Hussein (Germany)

22 September 2015
18:45

Sweden	3–0	Poland
Hurtig 21'; Schough 52'; Diaz 72'	Report

Gamla Ullevi, Gothenburg
Attendance: 5,460
Referee: Morag Pirie (Scotland)

22 October 2015
17:30

Poland	2–0	Slovakia
Chudzik 18'; Grabowska 63'	Report

Tychy City Stadium, Tychy
Attendance: 6,041
Referee: Stéphanie Frappart (France)
22 October 2015
19:00

Denmark	4–0	Moldova
Troelsgaard 24'; Harder 35'; Nadim 52', 89'	Report

Viborg Stadion, Viborg
Attendance: 3,303
Referee: Olga Zadinová (Czech Republic)

26 October 2015
17:00

Slovakia	4–0	Moldova
Bíróová 50'; Fecková 81'; Škorvánková 85'; Vojteková 87' (pen.)	Report

NTC Senec, Senec
Attendance: 315
Referee: Mihaela Gurdon Basimamović (Croatia)

27 October 2015
18:45

Sweden	1–0	Denmark
Seger 59'	Report

Gamla Ullevi, Gothenburg
Attendance: 11,244
Referee: Kateryna Monzul (Ukraine)

26 November 2015
19:00

Slovakia	0–1	Denmark
	Report	Troelsgaard 34'

NTC Senec, Senec
Attendance: 420
Referee: Knarik Grigoryan (Armenia)

27 November 2015
12:00

Moldova	1–3	Poland
Andone 90+3'	Report	Pajor 56'; Daleszczyk 63'; Grabowska 81'

CSR Orhei, Orhei
Attendance: 40
Referee: Viola Raudziņa (Latvia)

1 December 2015
12:00

Moldova	0–4	Slovakia
	Report	Fecková 28', 54'; Ondrušová 32'; Bíróová 86'

CSR Orhei, Orhei
Attendance: 50
Referee: Gordana Kuzmanović (Serbia)

7 April 2016
20:00

Poland	0–0	Denmark
	Report

Tychy City Stadium, Tychy
Attendance: 5,248
Referee: Sandra Bastos (Portugal)

8 April 2016
17:00

Slovakia	0–3	Sweden
	Report	Appelqvist 27'; Sembrant 55'; Blackstenius 63'

NTC Poprad, Poprad
Attendance: 646
Referee: Eleni Lampadariou (Greece)

12 April 2016
17:30

Slovakia	2–1	Poland
Vojteková 76' (pen.); Hmírová 90+3'	Report	Daleszczyk 30'

NTC Poprad, Poprad
Attendance: 356
Referee: Esther Azzopardi (Malta)

2 June 2016
18:00

Poland	0–4	Sweden
	Report	Ilestedt 40'; Schelin 60'; Asllani 70'; Rolfö 87'

Stadion ŁKS, Łódź
Attendance: 1,724
Referee: Olga Zadinová (Czech Republic)
2 June 2016
19:00

Denmark	4–0	Slovakia
Harder 28'; Nadim 49', 60' (pen.); Troelsgaard 90+2'	Report

Viborg Stadion, Viborg
Attendance: 3,412
Referee: Carina Vitulano (Italy)

6 June 2016
17:45

Sweden	6–0	Moldova
Munteanu 34' (o.g.); Asllani 41', 61'; Rolfö 48', 88'; Berglund 90+3'	Report

Gamla Ullevi, Gothenburg
Attendance: 9,168
Referee: Graziella Pirriatore (Italy)

7 June 2016
19:00

Denmark	6–0	Poland
Troelsgaard 18', 27', 62'; Harder 24', 41'; Rasmussen 53'	Report

Viborg Stadion, Viborg
Attendance: 4,611
Referee: Efthalia Mitsi (Greece)

15 September 2016
18:45

Sweden	2–1	Slovakia
Appelqvist 23'; Hammarlund 65'	Report	Fischerová 59'

Gamla Ullevi, Gothenburg
Attendance: 11,460
Referee: Anastasia Pustovoitova (Russia)
15 September 2016
19:00

Moldova	0–5	Denmark
	Report	Nadim 3', 68'; Harder 18', 33', 74'

Zimbru Stadium, Chișinău
Attendance: 980
Referee: Eleni Antoniou (Greece)

20 September 2016
18:00

Poland	4–0	Moldova
Pajor 43'; Daleszczyk 64'; Arnautu 68' (o.g.); Winczo 90+1'	Report

OSiR Włocławek, Włocławek
Attendance: 2,254
Referee: Simona Ghisletta (Switzerland)
20 September 2016
19:00

Denmark	2–0	Sweden
Rasmussen 12'; Nadim 47'	Report

Viborg Stadion, Viborg
Attendance: 7,432
Referee: Jana Adámková (Czech Republic)

== Goalscorers ==
7 goals

- (Denmark) Pernille Harder
- (Denmark) Nadia Nadim

6 goals

- (Denmark) Sanne Troelsgaard Nielsen

3 goals

- (Poland) Katarzyna Daleszczyk
- (Slovakia) Dana Fecková
- (Sweden) Kosovare Asllani
- (Sweden) Fridolina Rolfö

2 goals

- (Denmark) Johanna Rasmussen
- (Poland) Dominika Grabowska
- (Poland) Ewa Pajor
- (Slovakia) Alexandra Bíróová
- (Slovakia) Jana Vojteková
- (Sweden) Emilia Appelqvist
- (Sweden) Pauline Hammarlund
- (Sweden) Lotta Schelin
- (Sweden) Olivia Schough

1 goal

- (Moldova) Ludmila Andone
- (Poland) Natalia Chudzik
- (Poland) Agnieszka Winczo
- (Slovakia) Patrícia Fischerová
- (Slovakia) Patrícia Hmírová
- (Slovakia) Lucia Ondrušová
- (Slovakia) Dominika Škorvánková
- (Sweden) Emma Berglund
- (Sweden) Stina Blackstenius
- (Sweden) Malin Diaz
- (Sweden) Lina Hurtig
- (Sweden) Amanda Ilestedt
- (Sweden) Caroline Seger
- (Sweden) Linda Sembrant

1 own goal

- (Moldova) Ana Arnautu (playing against Poland)
- (Moldova) Natalia Munteanu (playing against Sweden)
