= 2015–16 in Danish football =

Football in Denmark
- Season: 2016

Men's football
- Superligaen: F.C. Copenhagen

Women's football
- Elitedivisionen: Fortuna Hjørring

== National teams ==
=== Denmark women's national football team ===
==== Friendlies and qualifications ====
Win Draw Loss

22 January 2016 Friendly	Denmark	0–2	Netherlands	Belek, Turkey
		Report	Martens 70' van de Sanden 90+4'	Stadium: Arcardia Belek; Attendance: 63; Referee: Melis Özcigdem (Turkey)

22 January 2016 Friendly	Denmark	1–2	Netherlands	Belek, Turkey
	Troelsgaard 88'	Report	Miedema 44' van de Donk 90+2'	Stadium: Arcardia Belek; Attendance: 25; Referee: Neslihan Muzatdagi (Turkey)

2 March 2016 2016 Algarve Cup	Canada	0–1	Denmark	Albufeira, Portugal
		Report	Nadim 55'	Stadium: Estadio Municipal; Referee: Olga Miranda (Paraguay)

4 March 2016 2016 Algarve Cup	Denmark	1–4	Iceland	Parchal, Portugal
	Nadim 53'	Report	Þorvaldsdóttir 11'; Ómarsdóttir 12'; Magnúsdóttir 56', 90'	Stadium: Estadio Municipal da Bela Vista; Referee: Tupou Patia (Cook Islands)

7 March 2016 2016 Algarve Cup	Denmark	1–2	Belgium	Albufeira, Portugal
	Sandvej 90+3'	Report	Boye Sørensen 43' (o.g.); Cayman 86'	Stadium: Albufeira Municipal Stadium; Referee: Aye Thein (Myanmar)

9 March 2016 2016 Algarve Cup	Denmark	3–1	Portugal	Parchal, Portugal
	Troelsgaard 4', 11'; Rasmussen 81'	Report	Di. Silva 73'	Stadium: Bela Vista Municipal Stadium; Referee: Tupou Patia (Cook Islands)

7 April 2016 UEFA Euro Qualifying	Poland	0–0	Denmark	Tychy, Poland
		Report		Stadium: Tychy City Stadium; Attendance: 5,248; Referee: Sandra Bastos (Portugal)

2 June 2016 UEFA Euro Qualifying	Denmark	4–0	Slovakia	Viborg, Denmark
	Harder 28'; Nadim 49', 60' (pen.); Troelsgaard 90+2'	Report		Stadium: Viborg Stadion; Attendance: 3,412; Referee: Carina Vitulano (Italy)

7 June 2016 UEFA Euro Qualifying	Denmark	6–0	Poland	Viborg, Denmark
	Troelsgaard 18', 27', 62'; Harder 24', 41'; Rasmussen 53'	Report		Stadium: Viborg Stadion; Referee: Efthalia Mitsi (Greece)

15 September 2016 UEFA Euro Qualifying	Moldova	0–5	Denmark	Chișinău, Moldova
		Report	Nadim 3', 68'; Harder 18', 33', 74'	Stadium: Zimbru Stadium; Attendance: 980; Referee: Eleni Antonioul (Greece)

20 September 2016 UEFA Euro Qualifying	Denmark	2–0	Sweden	Viborg, Denmark
	Rasmussen 12'; Nadim 47'	Report		Stadium: Viborg Stadion; Attendance: 7,432; Referee: Jana Adámková (Czech Republic)

20 October 2016 2016 Yongchuan Int. Tournament	Denmark	2–1	Uzbekistan	Yongchuan, China
	Troelsgaard 42'; Larsen 90+1'	Report	Narbekova 10'	Stadium: Yongchuan Stadium; Referee: Hei Xiaohu (China)

22 October 2016 2016 Yongchuan Int. Tournament	Denmark	1–0	Iceland	Yongchuan, China
	Rasmussen 39'	Report		Stadium: Yongchuan Stadium; Referee: Qin Liang (China)

24 October 2016 2016 Yongchuan Int. Tournament	China	1–0	Denmark	Yongchuan, China
	Guixin 48'	Report		Stadium: Yongchuan Stadium; Referee: Qin Liang (China)

28 November 2016 Friendly	Belgium	1–3	Denmark	Tubize, Belgium
	Boye Sørensen 19'; Harder 61', 71'	Report	Vanmechelen 62'	Stadium: Stade Leburton; Attendance: 750; Referee: Vivian Peeters (Netherlands)

== Domestic results ==
=== Women's football ===
==== 2015–16 Elite Division ====
Pos	Team	Pld	W	D	L	GF	GA	GD	Pts	Qualification
1	Fortuna Hjørring	14	11	3	0	44	8	+36	36	Championship play-offs
2	Brøndby	14	10	3	1	60	8	+52	33	Championship play-offs
3	Skovbakken	14	7	5	2	22	20	+2	26	Championship play-offs
4	KoldingQ	14	7	3	4	29	15	+14	24	Championship play-offs
5	OB	14	5	3	6	29	18	+11	18	Championship play-offs
6	Vejle	14	3	3	8	12	31	−19	12	Championship play-offs
7	BSF	14	1	3	10	8	52	−44	6	Qualification play-offs
8	ASA	14	0	1	13	6	58	−52	1	Qualification play-offs

Source: Danish Football Association (in Danish)
Rules for classification: 1) Points; 2) Goal difference; 3) Goals scored; 4) Head-to-head points; 5) Head-to-head goal difference; 6) Play-off (played on neutral grounds if determining teams for different rounds) or draw.

===== Championship round =====
For the championship play-offs, the points of the regular season are halved, rounded up and carried over.

Pos	Team	Pld	W	D	L	GF	GA	GD	Pts	Qualification
1	Brøndby (C)	6	5	1	0	29	3	+26	43	Champions League QR
2	Fortuna Hjørring	6	4	1	1	11	8	+3	36	Champions League QR
3	OB	6	0	2	4	3	15	−12	17	
4	Skovbakken	6	0	2	4	1	18	−17	16	

Source: Danish Football Association
Rules for classification: 1) Points; 2) Goal difference; 3) Number of goals scored; 4) Head-to-head points; 5) Head-to-head goal difference; 6) Head-to-head away goals scored
(C) Champions

==== Results ====
Home \ Away	BRØ	HJØ	ODE	IKS
Brøndby		6–1	2–0	6–0
Fortuna Hjørring	1–1		2–1	2–0
OB	1–6	0–4		1–1
Skovbakken	0–8	0–1	0–0	

Source: DBU.dk
Legend: Blue = home team win; Yellow = draw; Red = away team win.
