= Elisabetta Tona =

Italian footballer (born 1984)

Personal information
- Full name: Elisabetta Tona
- Date of birth: 22 January 1984 (age 42)
- Place of birth: Lecco, Italy
- Height: 1.75 m (5 ft 9 in)
- Position: Centre back

Youth career
- 1997–1999: Fiammamonza

Senior career*
Years	Team	Apps	(Gls)
1999–2003	Fiammamonza		
2003	Torres		
2007	→ Indiana (loan)	20	(3)
2008–2015	Torres	117	(40)
2015–2016	Fiorentina	20	(5)
2016–2017	Chieti	21	(3)
2017–2019	Florentia	40	(14)

International career^{‡}
- Italy U19
2002–2013	Italy	97	(11)
- * Club domestic league appearances and goals ‡ National team caps and goals as of 12:00, 1 July 2013 (UTC)

Elisabetta Tona (born 22 January 1984) is an Italian former football defender who played for Florentia. She previously enjoyed a long association with Torres CF, where she won four Italian leagues, four nationals cups and two Italy Women's Cups in twelve seasons. She has also won the 2007 WPSL, playing for FC Indiana. As a member of the Italy national team she played at the 2005 and 2009 UEFA Women's Championships.

A commanding centre back, Tona's powerful heading ability makes her an important attacking player for her teams.

== Club career ==
In summer 2003 Tona transferred from her first club ASD Fiammamonza to Torres Calcio Femminile.

== International career ==
Tona made her senior debut for the Italy women's national football team in June 2002, in a 6–0 friendly win over Yugoslavia. She competed at UEFA Women's Euro 2005 in North West England and conceded a penalty kick in the Italians' 4–0 defeat to perennial champions Germany.

At UEFA Women's Euro 2009 in Finland, Tona played in all four games as the Italians reached the quarter-finals. She had scored a hat-trick against Hungary during the qualification round. National coach Antonio Cabrini named Tona in his selection for UEFA Women's Euro 2013 in Sweden, but replaced her with Federica Di Criscio when she was injured on the eve of the tournament.

== International goals ==
No.	Date	Venue	Opponent	Score	Result	Competition
1.	8 March 2006	Stadio Le Piane, Isernia, Italy	Scotland	1–0	4–0	Friendly
2.	8 March 2006	Stadio Le Piane, Isernia, Italy	Scotland	2–0	4–0	Friendly
3.	2 October 2008	Stadio Sandro Pertini, Montereale Valcellina, Italy	Hungary	1–0	3–0	UEFA Women's Euro 2009 qualifying
4.	2 October 2008	Stadio Sandro Pertini, Montereale Valcellina, Italy	Hungary	2–0	3–0	UEFA Women's Euro 2009 qualifying
5.	2 October 2008	Stadio Sandro Pertini, Montereale Valcellina, Italy	Hungary	3–0	3–0	UEFA Women's Euro 2009 qualifying
6.	8 April 2009	Rugby Park, Kilmarnock, Scotland	Scotland	2–0	4–1	Friendly
7.	24 October 2009	Hanrapetakan Stadium, Yerevan, Armenia	Armenia	1–0	8–0	2011 FIFA Women's World Cup qualification
8.	25 November 2009	Stadio Comunale di Francavilla, Francavilla al Mare, Italy	Armenia	1–0	7–0	2011 FIFA Women's World Cup qualification
9.	27 March 2010	Complexo Desportivo da Tocha, Tocha, Portugal	Portugal	1–0	3–1	2011 FIFA Women's World Cup qualification
10.	27 October 2010	Stadion Brügglifeld, Aarau, Switzerland	Switzerland	4–2	4–2	2011 FIFA Women's World Cup qualification play-offs
11.	8 December 2011	Estádio do Pacaembu, São Paulo, Brazil	Brazil	1–0	1–5	2011 International Women's Football Tournament of City of São Paulo
12.	16 June 2012	Stadio Olimpico di Torino, Turin, Italy	Macedonia	9–0	9–0	UEFA Women's Euro 2013 qualifying
13.	7 April 2013	Jacques Lemans Arena, Sankt Veit an der Glan, Austria	Austria	3–1	3–1	Friendly

== Honours ==
Torres Calcio

- Serie A: 2010, 2011, 2012, 2013
- Italian Women's Cup: 2011
- Italian Women's Super Cup: 2009, 2010, 2011, 2012, 2013
- Italy Women's Cup: 2008
