= Alex Hurst =

Alex Hurst may refer to:

- Alex Hurst (rugby), rugby league & rugby union footballer
- Alex Hurst (footballer), English footballer
- Alexandra Hurst, footballer from Northern Ireland
