= 2011 FIFA Women's World Cup qualification – UEFA play-offs =

Football tournament qualification play-offs

The 2011 FIFA Women's World Cup qualification UEFA play-offs were a series of two-legged ties determining qualification for the 2011 FIFA Women's World Cup. They involved the eight group winners from the first stage of European qualification.

== Format ==
The play-offs consisted of two sections.

The first section was the direct qualification to the 2011 FIFA Women's World Cup finals. The eight group winners were paired for four two-legged ties – the winner of each tie qualified for the 2011 FIFA Women's World Cup in Germany.

The second section was the repechage qualification to the UEFA-CONCACAF play-off. The four losers from the direct qualifiers were paired for two two-legged ties, with the two winners playing off over two legs for the right to play against the third-placed CONCACAF nation for a place in the 2011 FIFA Women's World Cup.

== Qualification and seeding ==
The eight UEFA qualification group winners qualified for the play-offs. The play-off draw seeding according to results in this qualifying competition and those for UEFA Women's EURO 2009.

Legend
Seeded teams
Unseeded teams

Group	Team	Seeding coefficient
8	Sweden	2.875
1	France	2.833
2	Norway	2.750
5	England	2.625
3	Denmark	2.563
7	Italy	2.500
4	Ukraine	2.250
6	Switzerland	2.000

== Direct qualification ==
The four winners qualified for the 2011 FIFA Women's World Cup in Germany. The draw was held on 30 August 2010. Ties were held on 11–12 September and 15–16 September.

=== Matches ===
11 September 2010
20:45 UTC+2

France	0–0	Italy
	Report

Stade Léo Lagrange, Besançon
Attendance: 9,154
Referee: Kateryna Monzul (Ukraine)
15 September 2010
15:00 UTC+2

Italy	2–3	France
Panico 34'; Domenichetti 90+3'	Report	Bussaglia 54'; Thiney 58'; Bompastor 90+2'

Stadio Pietro Barbetti, Gubbio
Referee: Jenny Palmqvist (Sweden)

France won 3–2 on aggregate and qualified for the 2011 FIFA Women's World Cup. Italy advanced to the repechage qualification.

12 September 2010
19:00 UTC+1

England	2–0	Switzerland
Williams 44'; K. Smith 45+2'	Report

Greenhous Meadow, Shrewsbury
Attendance: 4,119
Referee: Claudine Brohet (Belgium)
16 September 2010
19:00 UTC+2

Switzerland	2–3	England
Bachmann 41'; Zumbühl 65'	Report	K. Smith 32'; Eniola Aluko 34'; Williams 50' (pen.)

Stadion Niedermatten, Wohlen
Attendance: 1,800
Referee: Cristina Dorcioman (Romania)

England won 5–2 on aggregate and qualified for the 2011 FIFA Women's World Cup. Switzerland advanced to the repechage qualification.

11 September 2010
18:00 UTC+3

Ukraine	0–1	Norway
	Report	Mjelde 32'

Stadion Yuri Gagarin, Chernihiv
Attendance: 5,000
Referee: Dagmar Damková (Czech Republic)
15 September 2010
18:00 UTC+2

Norway	2–0	Ukraine
Pedersen 6'; Gulbrandsen 86'	Report

Nadderud stadion, Bærum
Attendance: 1,104
Referee: Alexandra Ihringova (England)

Norway won 3–0 on aggregate and qualified for the 2011 FIFA Women's World Cup. Ukraine advanced to the repechage qualification.

11 September 2010
16:00 UTC+2

Sweden	2–1	Denmark
Forsberg 12'; Schelin 61'	Report	Paaske-Sørensen 64'

Gamla Ullevi, Gothenburg
Attendance: 1,567
Referee: Christina Westrum Pedersen (Norway)
16 September 2010
18:30 UTC+2

Denmark	2 – 2 (a.e.t.)	Sweden
J. Rasmussen 41'; Paaske-Sørensen 43'	Report	Rohlin 73', 94'

Vejle Stadion, Vejle
Referee: Bibiana Steinhaus (Germany)

Sweden won 4–3 on aggregate and qualified for the 2011 FIFA Women's World Cup. Denmark advanced to the repechage qualification.

== Repechage qualification ==
The four losing teams from the qualification play-offs played-off for the right to play against the third-placed CONCACAF nation for a place in the World Cup finals.

The first round of repechage ties was played on 2 and 6 October and the second round on 23 and 27 October.

=== Knock-out map ===
Repechage I
1	Ukraine	0	0	0
4	Italy	3	0	3
3	Denmark	1	0	1
2	Switzerland	3	0	3

Repechage II
Italy	1	4	5
Switzerland	0	2	2

=== Repechage I ===
3 October 2010
13:45 UTC+2

Denmark	1–3	Switzerland
Harder 87'	Report	Crnogorcevic 18'; Zumbühl 50'; Abbé 83' (pen.)

Vejle Stadion, Vejle
Attendance: 2,055
Referee: Dagmar Damková (Czech Republic)
7 October 2010
18:30 UTC+2

Switzerland	0–0	Denmark
	Report

Stadion Brügglifeld, Aarau
Attendance: 1,200
Referee: Jenny Palmqvist (Sweden)

Switzerland won 3–1 on aggregate and advanced to the second round of repechage qualification.

2 October 2010
18:00 UTC+3

Ukraine	0–3	Italy
	Report	Conti 60'; Panico 81'; Pini 89'

Stadion Yuri Gagarin, Chernihiv
Referee: Christina Westrum Pedersen (Norway)
6 October 2010
15:00 UTC+2

Italy	0–0	Ukraine
	Report

Stadio Domenico Francioni, Latina
Referee: Kirsi Heikkinen (Finland)

Italy won 3–0 on aggregate and advanced to the second round of repechage qualification.

=== Repechage II ===
23 October 2010
16:30 UTC+2

Italy	1–0	Switzerland
Tuttino 86'	Report

Stadio Omobono Tenni, Treviso
Referee: Kateryna Monzul (Ukraine)
27 October 2010
18:30 UTC+2

Switzerland	2–4	Italy
Maendly 56', 79'	Report	Panico 52'; Camporese 61' (pen.), 63'; Tona 89'

Stadion Brügglifeld, Aarau
Referee: Bibiana Steinhaus (Germany)

Italy won 5–2 on aggregate and advanced to the UEFA-CONCACAF play-off.
