= São Caetano =

São Caetano (Portuguese for Saint Cajetan) may refer to:

== Places ==
- São Caetano (Madalena), a parish in the municipality of Madalena in the Portuguese Azores
- São Caetano (Cantanhede), a parish in Cantanhede Municipality, Portugal
- São Caetano do Sul, a city in the state of São Paulo, Brazil
- São Caetano, Pernambuco, a city in the state of Pernambuco, Brazil

== Sports ==
- São Caetano Futebol, a Brazilian football club
- São Caetano Esporte Clube, a Brazilian professional women's volleyball team
