= 2011 FIFA Women's World Cup qualification – UEFA Group 7 =

Football tournament qualification stage

The 2011 FIFA Women's World Cup qualification UEFA Group 7 was a UEFA qualifying group for the 2011 FIFA Women's World Cup. The group comprised Italy, Finland, Portugal, Slovenia and Armenia.

Italy won the group and advanced to the play-off rounds.

== Standings ==
Team	Pld	W	D	L	GF	GA	GD	Pts	Italy	Finland	Portugal	Slovenia	Armenia
Italy	8	7	1	0	38	3	+35	22	—	1–1	2–0	6–0	7–0
Finland	8	6	1	1	25	6	+19	19	1–3	—	4–1	4–1	7–0
Portugal	8	4	0	4	17	10	+7	12	1–3	0–1	—	1–0	7–0
Slovenia	8	2	0	6	7	27	−20	6	0–8	0–3	0–4	—	1–0
Armenia	8	0	0	8	1	42	−41	0	0–8	0–4	0–3	1–5	—

== Results ==
19 September 2009
17:00 UTC+5

Armenia	0–4	Finland
	Report	Talonen 1', 40'; Saari 78'; Malaska 88'

Hrazdan Stadium, Yerevan
Referee: Mihaela Gurdon Bašimamović (Croatia)
19 September 2009
18:30 UTC+2

Slovenia	0–8	Italy
	Report	Conti 3', 13', 41'; Gabbiadini 14', 29'; Carissimi 40'; Fuselli 81'; Panico 90+3'

Sports Park, Domžale
Referee: Efthalia Mitsi (Greece)

23 September 2009
15:00 UTC+2

Italy	2–0	Portugal
Panico 45', 65'	Report

Stadio Centro d'Italia, Rieti
Referee: Claudine Brohet (Belgium)

24 October 2009
15:00 UTC+5

Armenia	0–8	Italy
	Report	Tona 12'; Conti 25', 83' (pen.); Gama 29', 68'; Fuselli 55'; Schiavi 70'; Panico 90+2'

Hanrapetakan Stadium, Yerevan
Referee: Rhona Daly (Republic of Ireland)
24 October 2009
14:00 UTC+2

Slovenia	0–3	Finland
	Report	Österberg Kalmari 61'; Salmén 67'; Sjölund 68'

Stadion Matije Gubca, Krško
Referee: Esther Azzopardi (Malta)

28 October 2009
15:00 UTC+4

Armenia	1–5	Slovenia
Mangasaryan 74' (pen.)	Report	Milenkovič 25'; Tibaut 41'; Zver 54', 75'; Vrabel 63'

Hanrapetakan Stadium, Yerevan
Referee: Natalia Aleksakhina (Ukraine)
28 October 2009
15:00 UTC±0

Portugal	0–1	Finland
	Report	Saari 49'

Estádio João Cardoso, Tondela
Referee: Alexandra Ihringova (England)

21 November 2009
16:00 UTC+2

Finland	7–0	Armenia
Österberg Kalmari 2', 34', 77'; Sjölund 19', 38', 83'; Rantanen 45+1'	Report

Finnair Stadium, Helsinki
Referee: Anja Kunick (Germany)
21 November 2009
14:00 UTC+1

Slovenia	0–4	Portugal
	Report	Ana Borges 50'; Carla Couto 68'; Sónia Matias 76'; Edite Fernandes 77'

Stadion Športni Park, Nova Gorica
Referee: Florence Guillemin (France)

25 November 2009
15:00 UTC+1

Italy	7–0	Armenia
Tona 1'; Conti 40'; Gabbiadini 50', 80'; Panico 52', 90+4'; Camporese 77' (pen.)	Report

Stadio Comunale di Francavilla, Francavilla al Mare
Referee: Zuzana Kováčová (Slovakia)

27 March 2010
15:30 UTC+1

Slovenia	1–0	Armenia
Milenkovič 56'	Report

Ob Jezeru, Velenje
Referee: Monica Mularczyk (Poland)
27 March 2010
15:00 UTC±0

Portugal	1–3	Italy
Ana Borges 41'	Report	Tona 24'; Panico 43'; Camporese 70'

Complexo Desportivo da Tocha, Tocha
Referee: Floarea Babadac-Ionescu (Romania)

31 March 2010
15:00 UTC+2

Italy	1–1	Finland
Gabbiadini 18'	Report	Tiilikainen 4'

Stadio Cino e Lillo Del Duca, Ascoli Piceno
Referee: Tanja Schett (Austria)
31 March 2010
15:00 UTC+1

Portugal	7–0	Armenia
Edite Fernandes 22', 49', 86'; Sílvia Rebelo 27'; Cláudia Neto 33'; Sofia Vieira 40' (pen.); Carole Costa 44'	Report

Complexo Desportivo da Tocha, Tocha
Referee: Paula Thörn (Sweden)

19 June 2010
12:15 UTC+3

Finland	4–1	Portugal
Österberg Kalmari 28', 44' (pen.), 58'; Sällström 70'	Report	Edite Fernandes 22'

ISS Stadion, Vantaa
Referee: Kateryna Monzul (Ukraine)
19 June 2010
16:00 UTC+2

Italy	6–0	Slovenia
Gabbiadini 2'; Domenichetti 29'; Camporese 37' (pen.); Golob 69' (o.g.); Conti 73'; Panico 78'	Report

Stadio Sandro Pertini, Montereale Valcellina
Referee: Natalia Avdonchenko (Russia)

23 June 2010
20:00 UTC+3

Finland	1–3	Italy
Sällström 49'	Report	Conti 5'; Gabbiadini 66'; Parisi 70' (pen.)

ISS Stadion, Vantaa
Referee: Bibiana Steinhaus (Germany)
23 June 2010
18:00 UTC+1

Portugal	1–0	Slovenia
Inês Borges 46'	Report

Municipal Stadium, Cartaxo
Referee: Mihaela Gurdon Bašimamović (Croatia)

25 August 2010
18:00 UTC+5

Armenia	0–3	Portugal
	Report	Dolores Silva 31', 64'; Carole Costa 55'

Mika Stadium, Yerevan
Referee: Ann-Helen Østervold (Norway)
25 August 2010
19:00 UTC+3

Finland	4–1	Slovenia
Sällström 16', 70', 89'; Sjölund 79' (pen.)	Report	Zver 27'

Wiklöf Holding Arena, Mariehamn
Referee: Rhona Daly (Republic of Ireland)
