= Vilamar e Corticeiro de Cima =

- Civil parish
- Location in Portugal
- Coordinates: 40.420°N 8.662°W
- Country: Portugal
- Region: Centro
- Intermunic. comm.: Região de Coimbra
- District: Coimbra
- Municipality: Cantanhede

Area
  - Total: 11.05 km^{2} (4.27 sq mi)

Population (2011)
  - Total: 1,501
  - Density: 135.8/km^{2} (351.8/sq mi)
- Time zone: UTC+00:00 (WET)
  - Summer (DST): UTC+01:00 (WEST)

Vilamar e Corticeiro de Cima is a civil parish in the municipality of Cantanhede, Portugal. It was formed in 2013 by the merger of the former parishes Vilamar and Corticeiro de Cima. The population in 2011 was 1,501, in an area of 11.05 km^{2} (4.27 sq mi). The civil parish is composed of four census designated villages, Vilamar being the seat and main town.

== Location ==
The parish is about 10 kilometers northwest of the city of Cantanhede, and 13 kilometers from the Atlantic coast.

== Economy ==
Economic activity is largely based on agriculture and jewellery, for which it is known throughout Portugal and beyond since the 19th century.
