= Emilia Brodin =

Swedish footballer (born 1990)

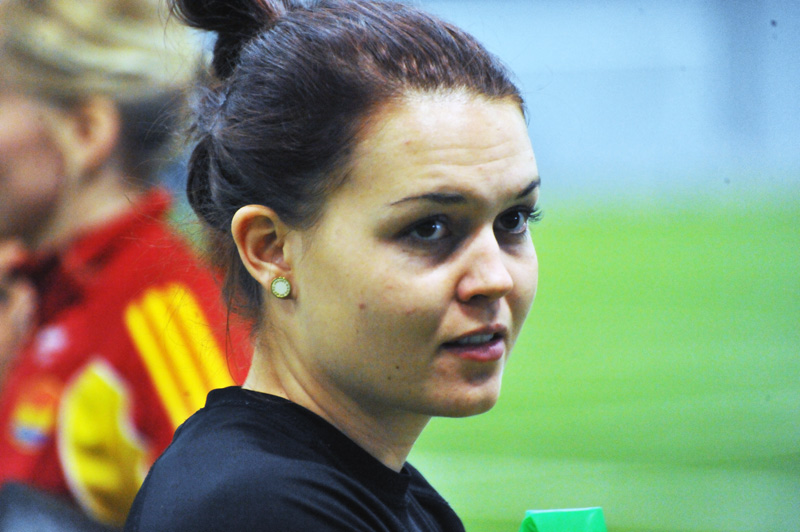
- Brodin training with Tyresö FF in March 2013

Personal information
- Full name: Emilia Elisabeth Brodin
- Date of birth: 11 February 1990 (age 36)
- Place of birth: Uppsala, Sweden
- Height: 1.68 m (5 ft 6 in)
- Position: Defensive midfielder

Youth career
- Uppsala-Näs IK
- Sunnersta AIF

Senior career*
Years	Team	Apps	(Gls)
2006–2008	Bälinge		
2009–2010	AIK	36	(0)
2011–2013	Tyresö	34	(0)
2013	→ Piteå (loan)	11	(1)
2014–2015	Piteå	30	(4)
2016-2017	Djurgårdens IF	16	(3)

International career^{‡}
2014–2016	Sweden	18	(2)
Medal record
Olympic Games
Silver medal – second place	2016 Rio de Janeiro	Team
- * Club domestic league appearances and goals as of 20:24, 20 January 2018 (UTC) ‡ National team caps and goals as of 20:24, 20 January 2018 (UTC)

Emilia Elisabeth Brodin (née Appelqvist; born 11 February 1990) is a Swedish footballer who played as a midfielder. She joined previous club Piteå IF for the 2014 season, having been on loan from Tyresö FF for the second part of the 2013 season. She has also played top-level club football for Bälinge IF and AIK. Appelqvist made her debut for the Sweden women's national football team in February 2014.

== Club career ==
Brodin, a defensive central midfielder, began her senior career with local team Bälinge IF. In October 2007, at the age of 17, she was given a four-year contract with the club and was described by the coach as a future national team player.

Brodin spent three seasons with Bälinge before their relegation from the Damallsvenskan in 2008. Ahead of the 2009 season, she rejected an offer from Tyresö FF and joined AIK instead. When AIK suffered relegation in 2010, a disappointed Brodin moved to Tyresö explaining that she had to keep playing Damallsvenskan football to be considered for the national team.

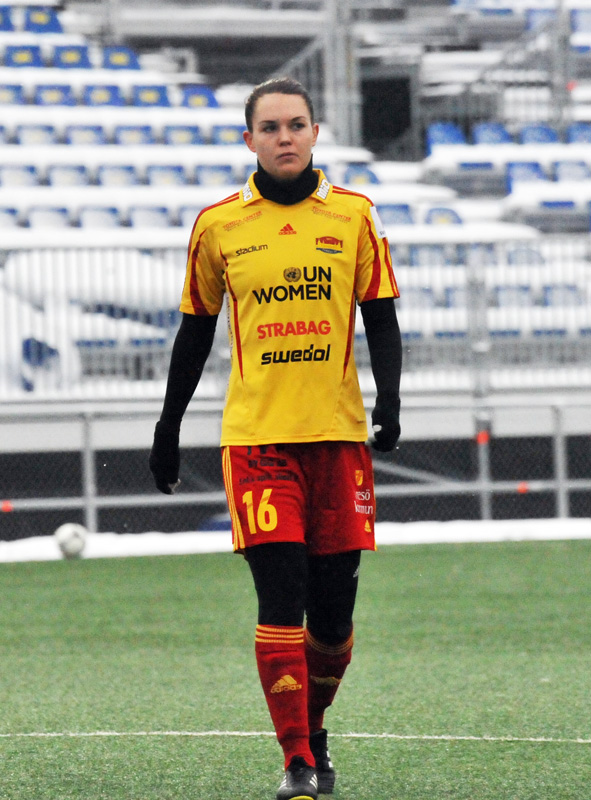
Brodin playing for Tyresö in 2013

Tyresö won the Damallsvenskan title for the first time in the 2012 season and Brodin collected her first league winner's medal. With competition for places increasingly fierce at Tyresö, Brodin moved to Piteå on loan during the 2013 mid-season break.

In November 2013 Brodin made her transfer to Piteå permanent, despite reported interest from other clubs. After helping Piteå to a third-place finish in 2015, she left for Djurgårdens IF, explaining that the social aspect of living back in Stockholm had attracted her.

A serious knee injury sustained in January 2017 ruled Brodin out of the entire 2017 Damallsvenskan season and UEFA Women's Euro 2017. Although that was the final year of her Djurgårdens contract, she was happy to sign a one-year extension in October 2017 and expected to be back to full fitness in 2018.

In March 2018 Brodin announced that she was pregnant with her first child. Although she had already resumed training after her knee injury, she was forced to put her football comeback plans on hold.

== International career ==
As a Swedish under-19 international, Brodin played the 2009 U-19 European Championship where she was chosen one of the Top 10 players by UEFA.com as well as the 2010 U-20 World Cup, serving as the team's captain. At the latter competition Brodin played every minute of Sweden's campaign, which ended with a 2–0 defeat by Colombia in the quarter-final.

In February 2010, Brodin and Antonia Göransson were called up to train with the senior national team for the Algarve Cup. By June 2013, Brodin had collected 11 caps for Sweden at the Under-23 level. National coach Pia Sundhage called Brodin up to a senior team training camp at Bosön in November 2013.

Brodin made her debut for the senior Sweden team in a 3–0 friendly defeat by France in Amiens on 8 February 2014. In May 2015, Brodin and Piteå teammate Hilda Carlén were both confirmed in Sweden's squad for the 2015 FIFA Women's World Cup in Canada.

On 8 April 2016, Brodin scored her first goal for the Swedish national senior team, making it 1–0 as Sweden beat Slovakia 3–0 in Poprad during a qualifying game for the 2017 European Championship in the Netherlands. Despite requiring surgery on a meniscus injury in mid-May 2016, Brodin was named in Sweden's 18-player squad for the 2016 Summer Olympics. She described her selection as a "dream come true". She made a 15-minute substitute appearance against hosts Brazil in a disappointing 5–1 defeat, then started the semi-final victory over the same opposition as Sweden ultimately secured silver medals.

=== International goals ===
Key (expand for notes on "international goals" and sorting)
Location	Geographic location of the venue where the competition occurred Sorted by country name first, then by city name
Lineup	Start – played entire match on minute (off player) – substituted on at the minute indicated, and player was substituted off at the same time off minute (on player) – substituted off at the minute indicated, and player was substituted on at the same time (c) – captain Sorted by minutes played
#	NumberOfGoals.goalNumber scored by the player in the match (alternate notation to Goal in match)
Min	The minute in the match the goal was scored. For list that include caps, blank indicates played in the match but did not score a goal.
Assist/pass	The ball was passed by the player, which assisted in scoring the goal. This column depends on the availability and source of this information.
penalty or pk	Goal scored on penalty-kick which was awarded due to foul by opponent. (Goals scored in penalty-shoot-out, at the end of a tied match after extra-time, are not included.)
Score	The match score after the goal was scored. Sorted by goal difference, then by goal scored by the player's team
Result	The final score. Sorted by goal difference in the match, then by goal difference in penalty-shoot-out if it is taken, followed by goal scored by the player's team in the match, then by goal scored in the penalty-shoot-out. For matches with identical final scores, match ending in extra-time without penalty-shoot-out is a tougher match, therefore precede matches that ended in regulation
aet	The score at the end of extra-time; the match was tied at the end of 90' regulation
pso	Penalty-shoot-out score shown in parentheses; the match was tied at the end of extra-time
	Green background color – exhibition or closed door international friendly match
	Yellow background color – match at an invitational tournament
	Red background color – Olympic women's football qualification match
	Light-blue background color – FIFA women's world cup qualification match
	Pink background color – Olympic women's football tournament
	Blue background color – FIFA women's world cup final tournament
NOTE: some keys may not apply for a particular football player

Goal	Date	Location	Opponent	#	Score	Result	Competition
1	2016-04-08	Poprad, Slovakia	Slovakia	1.1	0–1	0–3	Euro 2017 qualifying
2	2016-09-15	Gothenburg, Sweden	Slovakia	2.2	1–0	2–1	Euro 2017 qualifying

== Personal life ==
In July 2017, Brodin married her childhood sweetheart Daniel Brodin, a professional ice hockey player for Djurgårdens IF Hockey of the Swedish Hockey League. In September 2018 she gave birth to the couple's first child, a daughter named Mila Ida.

== Honours ==
=== Club ===
Tyresö FF

- Damallsvenskan: 2012

=== International ===
- Summer Olympic Games: Silver medal, 2016
