= Veronika Klechová =

Slovak footballer

Personal information
- Date of birth: 5 May 1989 (age 37)
- Place of birth: Czechoslovakia
- Position: Midfielder

Senior career*
Years	Team	Apps	(Gls)
- Slovan Bratislava
- Cardiff City Ladies
2014–?	Inverness City		

International career
2006–2015	Slovakia	70	(18)
- * Club domestic league appearances and goals

Veronika Klechová (born 5 May 1989) is a Slovak football midfielder who played for Slovan Bratislava in the Slovak First League, and Champions League. She was a member of the Slovak national team after debuting at the age of 17 in 2006. Klechová scored numerous goals for her country, including the only goal, a penalty, in a 1–0 win against Croatia in March 2012. She scored three goals in six appearances in 2015. Among these goals was a header in a 2–1 friendly victory against Wales in April, which was the winning goal. She finished her international career in 2015, having scored 18 goals in 70 appearances for Slovakia.

== Awards ==
Klechová was named the best women's player of 2008 at the SFZ Women's Footballer of the Year awards. She finished third in the same award in 2011.

== Personal life ==
Klechová has two brothers. In a relationship with Filip Kiss, when he was loaned from Cardiff City to Ross County in January 2014, Klechová made a similar move from Cardiff City Ladies to Inverness City. She married Kiss in December 2015; together they have a son called Ben.

== Writing career ==
Klechová has written three books, which she christened in December 2016. The first book, titled Futbalistka Lucka, was written about teammate Lucia Haršányová. The second one, Mini Paťka, is also about a teammate, this time Patrícia Hmírová. The third book, Mužíček a pes, relates to her home life.
