= Kristina Krstić =

Serbian footballer (born 1989)

Personal information
- Full name: Kristina Krstić
- Date of birth: 1 July 1989 (age 37)
- Place of birth: Niš, SFR Yugoslavia
- Height: 1.64 m (5 ft 5 in)
- Position: Striker

Team information
- Current team: BIIK Kazygurt
- Number: 20

Senior career*
Years	Team	Apps	(Gls)
2005–2012	Mašinac Niš		
2012–	BIIK Kazygurt		

International career
2008–	Serbia		
- * Club domestic league appearances and goals

Kristina Krstić (Serbian Cyrillic: Кристина Крстић; born 1 July 1989) is a Serbian football striker currently playing in the Kazakhstani Championship for BIIK Kazygurt. She previously played for Mašinac Niš in the Serbian First League. She has played the Champions League with both teams, and she is a member of the Serbian national team. She scored a winner over Croatia in the 2011 World Cup qualifying.
