= Cantanhede, Portugal =

Cantanhede
- Municipality
- City of Cantanhede
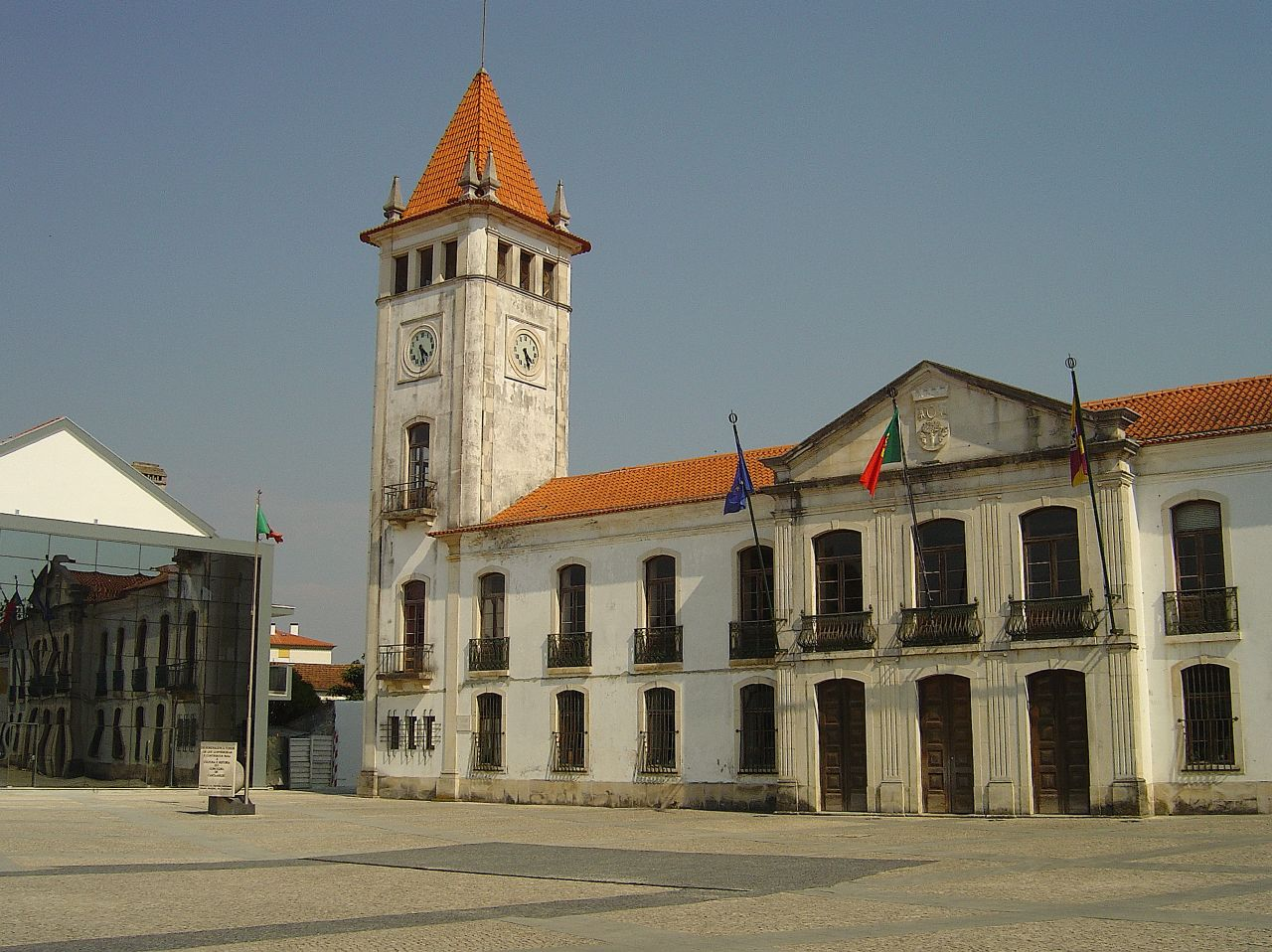
- View of Cantanhede

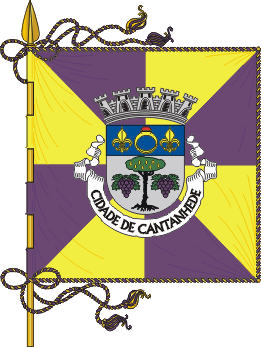
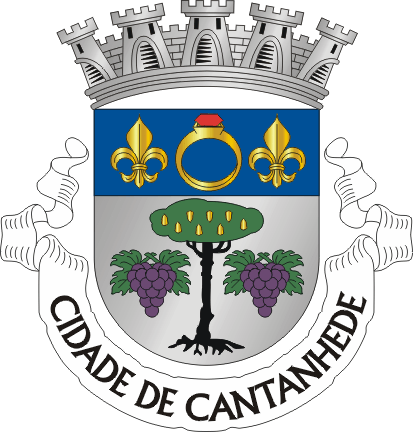
- Flag Coat of arms
- Interactive map of Cantanhede
- Location in Portugal
- Coordinates: 40°21′N 8°35′W
- Country: Portugal
- Region: Centro
- Intermunic. comm.: Região de Coimbra
- District: Coimbra
- Parishes: 14

Government
  - President: João Moura (PSD)

Area
  - Total: 390.88 km^{2} (150.92 sq mi)

Population (2011)
  - Total: 36,595
  - Density: 93.622/km^{2} (242.48/sq mi)
- Time zone: UTC+00:00 (WET)
  - Summer (DST): UTC+01:00 (WEST)
- Website: www.cm-cantanhede.pt

Cantanhede (Portuguese pronunciation: [kɐ̃tɐˈɲeðɨ]), officially the City of Cantanhede (Portuguese: Cidade de Cantanhede), is a city and municipality in the Coimbra District, in the Centro Region, Portugal. The population in 2011 was 36,595, in an area of 390.88 km^{2}.

== Location ==
Cantanhede is located in the Coimbra District, in the Baixo Mondego subregion of the Centro Region, halfway between the cities of Coimbra and Aveiro, in Portugal.

This small town is located around 25km from the beaches of Mira and Tocha on the Atlantic coast.

== History ==
The name "Cantanhede" comes from the Celtic cant, which means "great stone", and refers to the quarries in the region. It was the original Cantonieti, mentioned in the documentation of the centuries 11th, 12th and 13th also with the spellings Cantoniedi, Cantonidi and Cantonetu.

Its first historical references dating back to 1087, date on which Sisnando Davides, governor of Coimbra, provided the village with fortification and promoted its repopulation.

With a well-preserved urban area elevated to city (cidade) status by the Lei n.º 69/91, de 16 de Agosto in August 1991, and being home to a number of large and elegant houses, dating back to the 19th century, Cantanhede was granted foral in 1514 by the king Manuel I of Portugal.

In 2024, the limestone of Ançã was recognised as a World Heritage Stone.

== Economy ==
Traditionally a major agriculture center, Cantanhede is at the heart of the Bairrada DOC which produces famed wines. The town is home to Biocant Park, a biotechnology park. This park is attracting biosciences companies to Cantanhede, and has the scientific background of the University of Coimbra and Aveiro University, both associated entities of the project.

Cantanhede was growing fast, and the inauguration of the C.C. Rossio (local shopping center) helped to boost the area's economy. EXPOFACIC - Feira Agrícola, Comercial e Industrial de Cantanhede, a trade fair, agricultural show and festival, is a major event in the region and is organized every year in July, attracting thousands of visitors to Cantanhede.

== Parishes ==
The municipality is subdivided into the following parishes:

- Ançã
- Cadima
- Cantanhede e Pocariça
- Cordinhã
- Covões e Camarneira
- Febres
- Murtede
- Ourentã
- Portunhos e Outil
- São Caetano
- Sanguinheira
- Sepins e Bolho
- Tocha
- Vilamar e Corticeiro de Cima

== Famous people ==
- Pedro Teixeira (born in Cantanhede, unknown date - died 1640), a Portuguese explorer commissioned by the Portuguese governor of Maranhão, in current-day Brazil, to explore the Amazon in 1637.
- António Luís de Meneses (1596 - 1675 in Cantanhede) third Count of Cantanhede and a notable Portuguese general.
- João Crisóstomo de Amorim Pessoa (1810 in Cantanhede - 1888) Bishop of Santiago de Cabo Verde and archbishop of Goa and Braga.
- António Fragoso (1897 in Cantanhede - 1918 in Cantanhede), Portuguese composer and pianist.
- José de Carvalho Rodrigues Pereira (1929 in Cantanhede - 1984) an eminent lawyer for Petrogal.
- Lurdes Breu (born 1940 in Cantanhede), one of the first five women to be elected as a mayor of a Portuguese municipality.
- Dina Matos (born 1966 in Cantanhede) former first lady of the American state of New Jersey.
- Luís Filipe (born 1979 in Cantanhede), a footballer with 280 club caps.
- Carlitos (born 1981 in Cantanhede) retired footballer with 383 club caps.
- Nuno Dias (born 1972 in Cantanhede) futsal coach
