= Febres (Cantanhede) =

- Civil parish
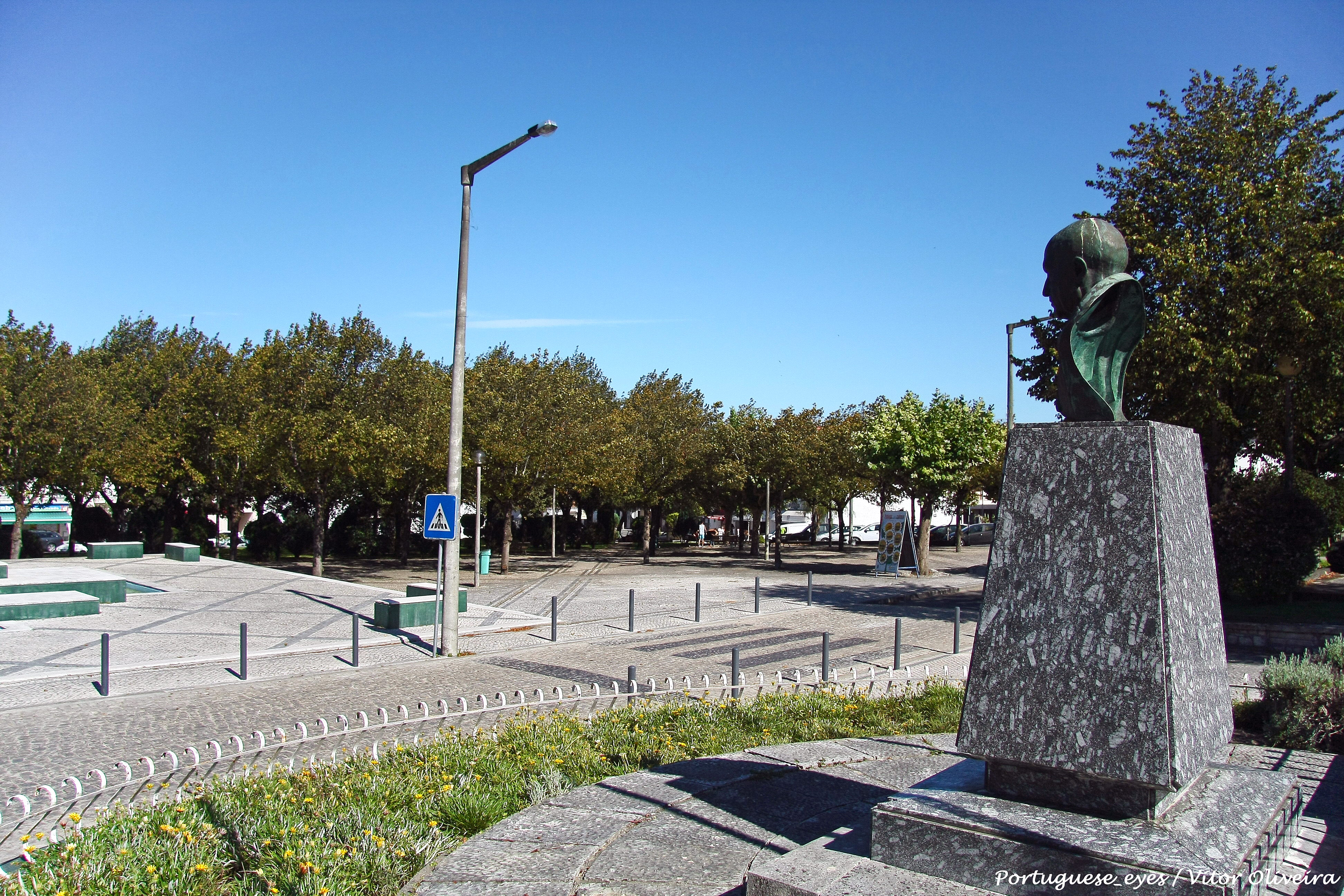

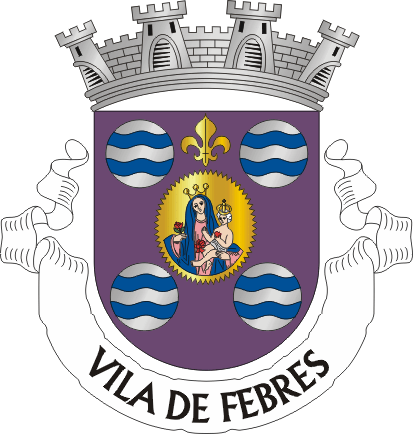
- Coat of arms

- Location in Portugal
- Coordinates: 40.400°N 8.629°W
- Country: Portugal
- Region: Centro
- Intermunic. comm.: Região de Coimbra
- District: Coimbra
- Municipality: Cantanhede

Area
  - Total: 22.94 km^{2} (8.86 sq mi)

Population (2011)
  - Total: 3,352
  - Density: 146.1/km^{2} (378.4/sq mi)
- Time zone: UTC+00:00 (WET)
  - Summer (DST): UTC+01:00 (WEST)

Febres is a civil parish in the municipality of Cantanhede, Portugal. The population in 2011 was 3,352, in an area of 22.94 km^{2} (8.86 sq mi).
