= Katarzyna Daleszczyk =

Polish footballer (born 1990)

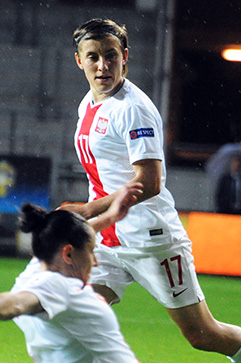
- Daleszczyk with Poland in 2015

Personal information
- Date of birth: 23 March 1990 (age 36)
- Place of birth: Gmina Sulejów, Poland
- Position: Midfielder

Team information
- Current team: Nuova Alba

Senior career*
Years	Team	Apps	(Gls)
2008–2009	MUKS Dargfil Tomaszów		
2009–2012	AZS PWSZ Biała Podlaska		
2012–2015	Górnik Łęczna		
2015–2017	Medyk Konin		
2017–2018	Brescia	20	(1)
2018–2019	Sassuolo	15	(2)
2019–2020	Czarni Sosnowiec	12	(10)
2020–2022	AZS AWF Kraków	48	(19)
2023–2024	Lumezzane		
2024–2025	Pro Palazzolo		
2025	Riccione		
2025–	Nuova Alba		

International career
2010–2020	Poland	39	(6)
- * Club domestic league appearances and goals as of 21:45, 2 June 2026 (UTC)

Katarzyna Daleszczyk (born 23 March 1990) is a Polish footballer who plays as a midfielder for Italian club Nuova Alba.

== Career statistics ==
=== International ===
Appearances and goals by national team and year
National team	Year	Apps	Goals
Poland	2010	1	0
Poland	2015	9	1
Poland	2016	11	2
Poland	2017	6	1
Poland	2018	6	1
Poland	2019	4	0
Poland	2020	2	1
Total		39	6

Scores and results list Poland's goal tally first, score column indicates score after each Daleszczyk goal.

List of international goals scored by Katarzyna Daleszczyk
No.	Date	Venue	Opponent	Score	Result	Competition
1	27 November 2015	CSR Orhei, Orhei, Moldova	Moldova	2–0	3–1	UEFA Euro 2017 qualifying
2	12 April 2016	NTC Poprad, Poprad, Slovakia	Slovakia	1–0	1–2	UEFA Euro 2017 qualifying
3	20 September 2016	OSiR Włocławek, Włocławek, Poland	Moldova	2–0	4–0	UEFA Euro 2017 qualifying
4	1 March 2017	Kargıcak, Turkey	Kosovo	2–0	5–0	2017 Turkish Women's Cup
5	6 April 2018	OSiR Włocławek, Włocławek, Poland	Albania	1–0	1–1	2019 FIFA World Cup qualification
6	7 March 2020	Polonia Stadium, Warsaw, Poland	Moldova	4–0	5–0	UEFA Euro 2022 qualifying

== Honours ==
Medyk Konin

- Ekstraliga: 2015–16, 2016–17
- Polish Cup: 2015–16, 2016–17

Brescia

- Supercoppa Italiana: 2017
