= Yasmin Bunter =

English footballer (born 1992)

Yasmin Rüpke
Personal information
- Full name: Yasmin Mary Bunter Jayasuriya
- Date of birth: 28 February 1992 (age 34)
- Place of birth: Fleet, England
- Height: 1.65 m (5 ft 5 in)
- Position: Defender

College career
| Years | Team | Apps | (Gls) |
| 2010–2013 | Francis Marion Patriots | 69 | (17) |

Senior career*
| Years | Team | Apps | (Gls) |
| –2005 | Southampton | | |
| 2008–2010 | Fulham | | |
| 2013 | Virginia Beach Piranhas | 7 | (1) |
| 2014 | Carolina Elite Cobras | 0 | (0) |
| 2014–2017 | Neunkirch | 59 | (15) |
| 2017–2023 | Basel | 110 | (6) |
- * Club domestic league appearances and goals as of 29 July 2023

Yasmin Bunter (born 28 February 1992) is an English former footballer who played as a defender.

== Early life ==
Bunter was born in Fleet, England. She started playing football at the age of nine. She grew up in England.

== College career ==
Bunter played football for the women's team of Francis Marion University in the United States. She was previously enrolled at Farnborough College in England.

== Club career ==
Bunter started her career with English side Southampton but left after their women's team was disbanded after relegation, before joining Fulham, but the women's team of Fulham then disbanded due to financial reasons.

In 2018, she competed in the UEFA Women's Champions League with Swiss side FCB for the first time.

== International career ==
Bunter is eligible to represent the Sri Lanka women's national football team internationally.

== Style of play ==
Bunter is known for her versatility as a player.

== Personal life ==
Bunter was born to a Sri Lankan mother.
