= Carlitos (footballer, born 1981) =

Portuguese footballer

Personal information
- Full name: Carlos Pereira Rodrigues
- Date of birth: 5 December 1981 (age 44)
- Place of birth: Cantanhede, Portugal
- Height: 1.72 m (5 ft 7 1/2 in)
- Position: Right-back

Youth career
- 1993–2000: Tocha

Senior career*
Years	Team	Apps	(Gls)
2000–2001	Tocha		
2001–2013	Naval	282	(4)
2013–2015	Farense	73	(0)
2016–2018	Tocha	21	(5)
2018–2019	Marialvas	22	(2)
Total		398	(11)
- * Club domestic league appearances and goals

Carlos Pereira Rodrigues (born 5 December 1981), known as Carlitos, is a Portuguese former professional footballer who played as a right-back.

== Club career ==
Carlitos was born in Cantanhede, Coimbra District. He began playing football with local amateurs U.D. Tocha, signing in 2001 with Associação Naval 1º de Maio in the Segunda Liga, where he was eventually awarded club captaincy.

In the 2005–06 season, both Naval and the player made their debut in the Primeira Liga. Carlitos' first game was a home fixture against FC Porto, and he played the full 90 minutes in a 3–2 defeat.
