= São Caetano (Cantanhede) =

- Civil parish
- Location in Portugal
- Coordinates: 40.382°N 8.679°W
- Country: Portugal
- Region: Centro
- Intermunic. comm.: Região de Coimbra
- District: Coimbra
- Municipality: Cantanhede

Area
  - Total: 19.04 km^{2} (7.35 sq mi)

Population (2011)
  - Total: 801
  - Density: 42.1/km^{2} (109/sq mi)
- Time zone: UTC+00:00 (WET)
  - Summer (DST): UTC+01:00 (WEST)
- Website: www.jf-tocha.pt

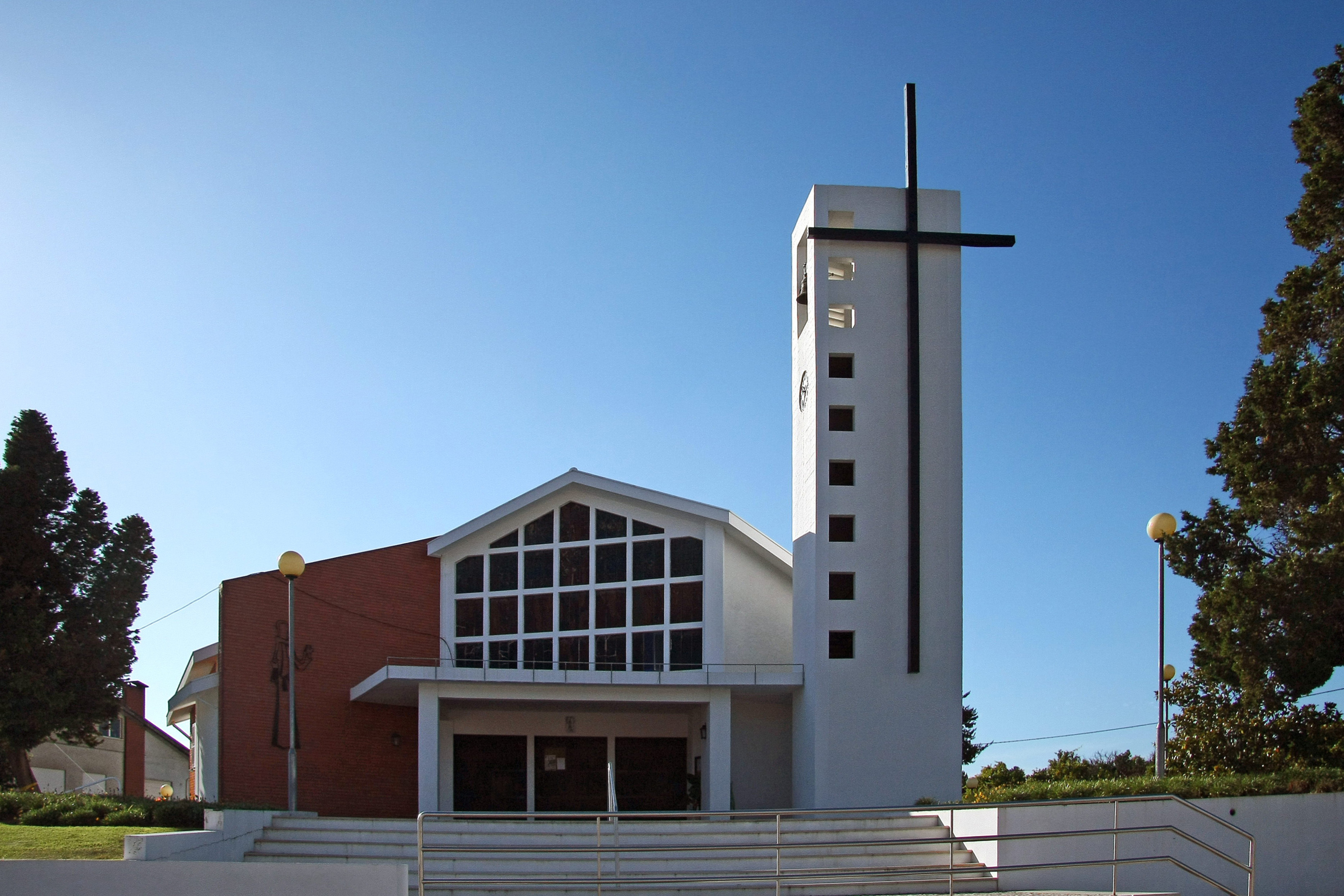
Church in the area

São Caetano is a civil parish in the municipality of Cantanhede, Portugal. The population in 2011 was 801, in an area of 19.04 km^{2} (7.35 sq mi). It contains 10 settlements: Perboi de Cima, Perboi de Baixo, Rilhóses, Sardão, Olho de S. Caetano, S. Caetano, Corgo Côvo, Criação, Pisão and Cantos.
