= Katrín Jónsdóttir =

Icelandic footballer (born 1977)

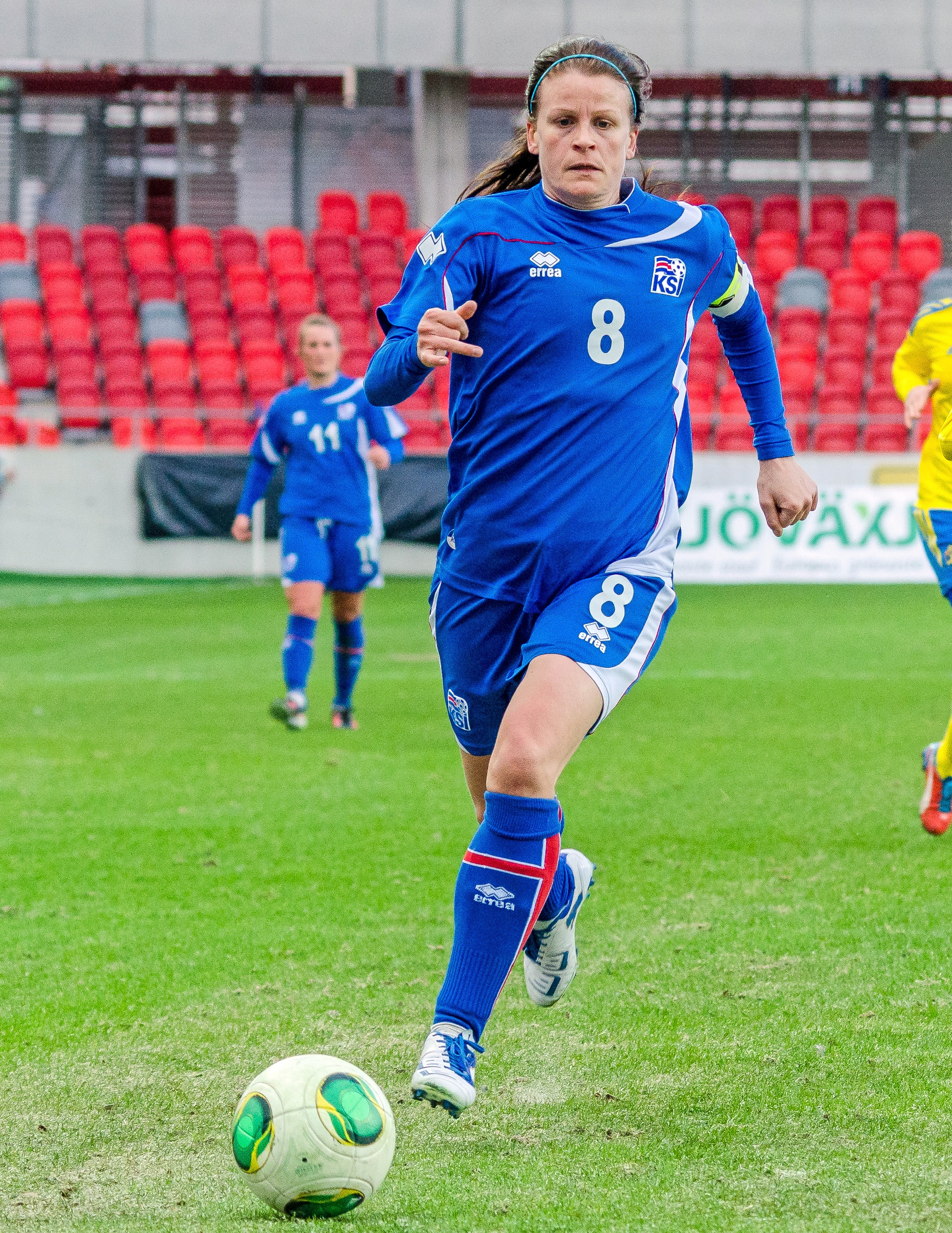
- Jónsdóttir playing an international friendly against Sweden at Myresjöhus Arena in Växjö, 6 April 2013

Personal information
- Date of birth: 31 May 1977 (age 49)
- Place of birth: Reykjavík, Iceland
- Height: 1.72 m (5 ft 8 in)
- Position: Defender

Senior career*
Years	Team	Apps	(Gls)
1991–1994	Breiðablik	41	(9)
1995	Stjarnan	14	(5)
1996–1997	Breiðablik	29	(12)
1998–1999	Kolbotn	16	(5)
1999	Breiðablik	2	(1)
1999–2004	Kolbotn	111	(62)
2004	Valur	6	(1)
2005	Amazon Grimstad	15	(4)
2006	Kolbotn	18	(8)
2006–2010	Valur	99	(39)
2011–2012	Djurgården	43	(2)
2013	Umeå IK	18	(0)
Total		412	(148)

International career^{‡}
1992–1993	Iceland U-17	11	(0)
1993–2001	Iceland U-21	27	(1)
1994–2013	Iceland	133	(21)
- * Club domestic league appearances and goals as of 21:35, 21 May 2014 (UTC) ‡ National team caps and goals as of 21:35, 21 May 2014 (UTC)

Katrín Jónsdóttir (born 31 May 1977) is an Icelandic former footballer who played as a defender. She was captain of Iceland's national team from 2007 to 2013 and competed at the 2009 and 2013 editions of the UEFA Women's Championship.

== Club career ==
Achievements across her career include being a ten time Úrvalsdeild kvenna champion, six time Icelandic Women's Football Cup winner, eight time Icelandic Women's Football Super Cup winner and Toppserien champion in 2002 and 2003. During her time in Norway playing for Kolbotn, she finished her medical studies and became a practising physician.

Katrín left Damallsvenskan club Djurgårdens IF in January 2013. She signed a one-year contract with Umeå IK.

== International career ==
In May 1994, Katrín made her senior Iceland debut in a 4–1 friendly win over Scotland.

At UEFA Women's Euro 2009, Katrín played in all three matches as Iceland were eliminated in the first round following defeats by France, Norway and Germany.

National team coach Siggi Eyjólfsson selected Katrín in the Iceland squad for UEFA Women's Euro 2013, where she played in the three group matches and the 4–0 quarter-final defeat to hosts Sweden.

== Personal life ==
Katrín's husband Þorvaldur is a former professional footballer who played for the Iceland national football team. They were married in August 2009, just before Katrín played at UEFA Women's Euro 2009.

== Honours ==
=== Individual ===
- Icelandic Women's Footballer of the Year: 1998
- Úrvalsdeild Player of the Year: 2009
- Athlete of Reykjavík: 2008.
- Most promising football player of the year in Iceland: 1997
