= Runa Vikestad =

Norwegian footballer (born 1984)

Personal information
- Full name: Runa Vikestad
- Date of birth: 13 August 1984 (age 42)
- Place of birth: Finnsnes, Norway
- Height: 1.72 m (5 ft 8 in)
- Position: Defender

Senior career*
Years	Team	Apps	(Gls)
2001–2005	Fløya		
2006–2007	Fortuna Hjørring		
2007–2013	Kolbotn	47	(5)
2013-2018	Røa IL	22	(2)
2019	SK Snøgg		

International career
2008–2012	Norway	15	(1)
- * Club domestic league appearances and goals

Runa Vikestad (born 13 August 1984) is a Norwegian former footballer who plays as a defender. She has played for IF Fløya and Denmark's Fortuna Hjørring.

From the age of 5 to 16 Vikestad played in boys' football teams at her home on the island of Senja. She was with Fløya when the club gained promotion to the Toppserien in 2002, and the club then finished in 5th place in 2003 and 3rd in 2004 and 2005. In 2006, she moved to Denmark and became a league champion with Fortuna Hjørring. Back in Norway in 2007 with Kolbotn she won the Norwegian Cup, and has captained the club since 2010.

She has been a member of the Norwegian national team on and off since 2004, taking part in the 2009 European Championship and the 2011 World Cup. She previously played the 2003 U-19 Euro, where Norway reached the final. Vikestad made her debut for Norway in 2008 and has of November 2012 been capped 15 times, scoring one goal.
