= FC Neunkirch =

- Full name: FC Neunkirch
- Nickname: FCN
- Founded: July 1, 1963; 63 years ago
- Ground: Sportplatz Randenblick, Neunkirch
- Capacity: 1000
- Manager: Hasan Dracic
- League: Nationalliga A
- 2016–17: Nationalliga A, 1st
- Website: http://www.fcneunkirch.ch/
Home colours	Away colours

FC Neunkirch is a Swiss women's association football club based in Neunkirch, a municipality in the canton of Schaffhausen. From 2007 the club was promoted in several consecutive seasons, reaching the top division Nationalliga A in 2013. The club has an associated men's team who play in the lower leagues.

In 2016–17 the team won its first national title.

== History ==
The football club was founded in 1963. A women's team only started playing in the league system in 2006. After four promotions in the next seven years the team reached the top level Nationalliga A.

The team ended the 2013–14 season in fourth place, third in the next season, and finished runners-up to Zürich in 2015–16.

In 2015 FC Neunkirch reached the semi-final of the Swiss Women's Cup. The team was leading FC Basel 1–0 when they were reduced to 10 players after their goalkeeper was shown a red card after 16 minutes. They eventually lost 2–1.

After ten out of ten wins in the 2016–17 season they stood in first place. The team received some criticism for their lack of youth teams and because only 4 players from a 21-woman squad were Swiss. They finished the season as champions and also won the 2017 cup final.

Days after winning the double, the club withdrew their team from the Nationalliga A. Estimated costs of over €500,000 for the next season proved too much for the club.

== Current squad ==
As of 15 November 2016.

No.	Position	Nation	Nation
4	DF	AUT	Romina Bell
6	DF	ENG	Yasmin Bunter
8	MF	SUI	Sandy Mändly
14	DF	USA	Kayla Chambers
16	MF	SVK	Dana Fecková
17	MF	ESP	Paula Serrano
18	MF	CYP	Loukritia Chrysostomou
19	MF	ITA	Martina Gelmetti
20	DF	GER	Celine Leusch
21	MF	ITA	Martina Capelli
23	DF	CRO	Leonarda Balog
38	GK	SUI	Sandra Bruderer

=== Former players ===
For details of current and former players, see Category:FC Neunkirch players.

- (Chile) Ryann Torrero
- (Jamaica) Nicole McClure
