= Lucia Haršányová =

Slovak footballer

Lucie Haršányová
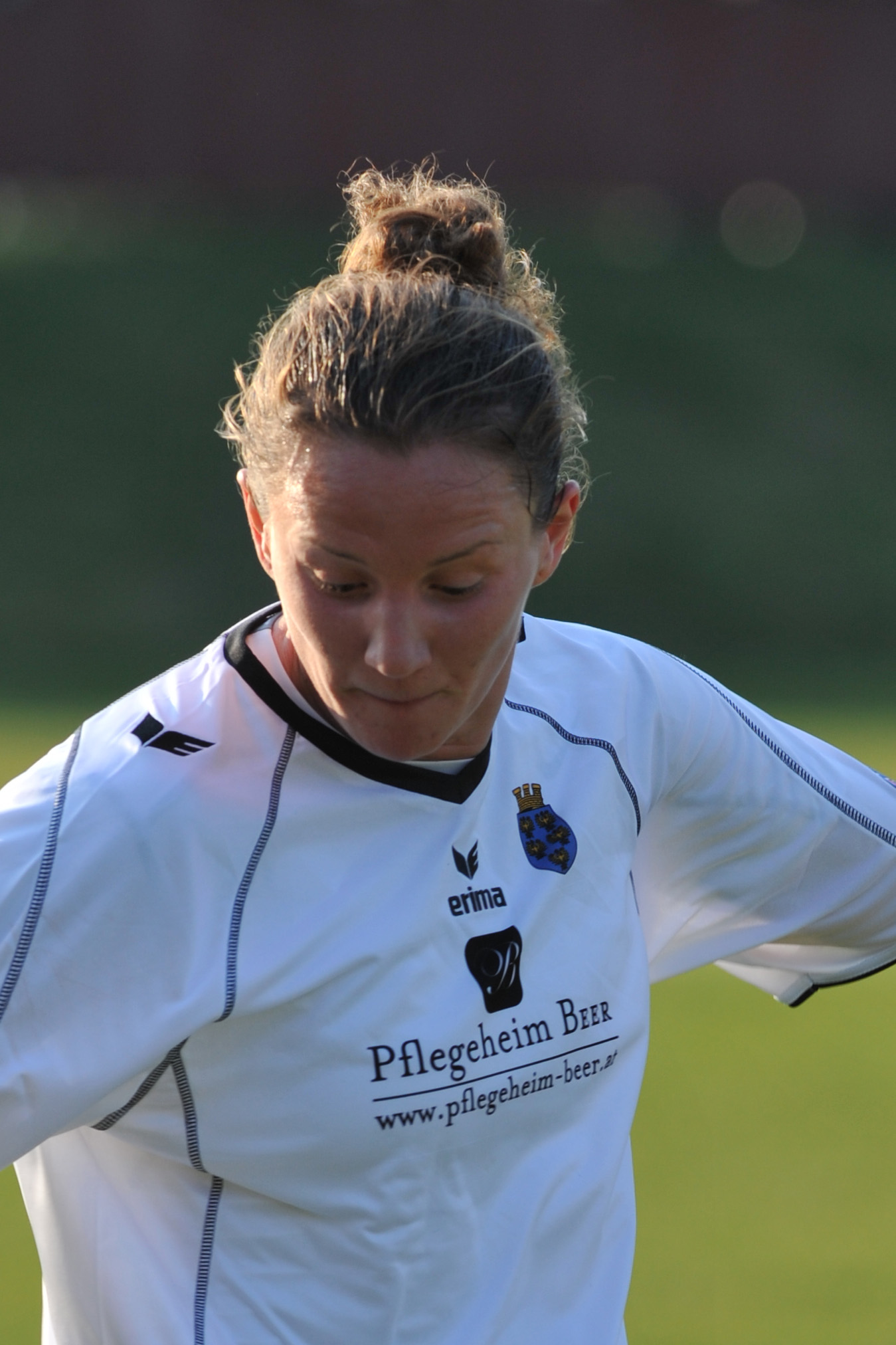
- Haršányová with Neulengbach in 2014

Personal information
- Date of birth: 27 August 1990 (age 36)
- Place of birth: Trnava, Czechoslovakia (now Slovakia)
- Height: 1.78 m (5 ft 10 in)
- Position: Defender

Youth career
- Suchá nad Parnou

Senior career*
Years	Team	Apps	(Gls)
- Skloplast Trnava
2010–2012	Slovan Bratislava		
2012–2015	SV Neulengbach		
2015–2017	FC Neunkirch		
2017–2018	MSV Duisburg	20	(2)
2018–2019	Hellas Verona	8	(0)
2019–2020	MSV Duisburg	17	(2)

International career
2011–2020	Slovakia		
- * Club domestic league appearances and goals

Lucie Haršányová (born 27 August 1990) is a Slovak footballer who plays as a defender.

== Club career ==
Haršányová has previously represented Swiss club FC Neunkirch as well as SV Neulengbach in the Austrian ÖFB-Frauenliga and UEFA Women's Champions League, and German club MSV Duisburg. In summer 2015 Haršányová transferred from Neulengbach to FC Neunkirch of the Swiss Nationalliga A.

== International career ==
Haršányová is a member of the Slovakia national team.
