= Rakel Logadóttir =

Icelandic footballer

Personal information
- Full name: Rakel Logadóttir
- Date of birth: 22 March 1981 (age 45)
- Place of birth: Iceland
- Position: Midfielder

Team information
- Current team: Valur

Senior career*
Years	Team	Apps	(Gls)
1997–2001	Valur	55	(24)
2002	ÍBV	9	(1)
2003–2014	Valur	152	(66)
2016–2017	Þróttur R.	9	(3)

International career^{‡}
1996–1998	Iceland U-17	10	(0)
1997–1999	Iceland U-19	7	(8)
1997–2003	Iceland U-21	27	(5)
2000–	Iceland	26	(2)
- * Club domestic league appearances and goals as of 8 September 2012 ‡ National team caps and goals as of 4 March 2011

Rakel Logadóttir (born 22 March 1981) is an Icelandic footballer who plays for Valur. Rakel has played for Iceland's national team and competed in UEFA Women's Euro 2009.

== Achievements ==
- Six times Icelandic champion (2004, 2006, 2007, 2008, 2009 and 2010).
- Five times Icelandic cup winner (2003, 2006, 2009, 2010 and 2011).

== Honours ==
- Most Promising Player in Valur in 1998
- Player of the Year in Valur in 1999
