= Elvira Urazaeva =

Belarusian footballer

Personal information
- Date of birth: 3 August 1991 (age 35)
- Place of birth: Ukraine,
- Position: Defender

Team information
- Current team: Zorka-BDU Minsk

Senior career*
Years	Team	Apps	(Gls)
2010-2018	Zorka-BDU Minsk	194	(63)
2019	FC Minsk	15	(1)
2020-	Zorka-BDU Minsk	0	(0)

International career^{‡}
2011-	Belarus	22	(2)
- * Club domestic league appearances and goals as of 18:40, 1 March 2020 (UTC) ‡ National team caps and goals as of 18:40, 1 March 2020 (UTC)

Elvira Urazaeva (born 3 August 1991) is a Belarusian footballer who plays as a defender and has appeared for the Belarus women's national team.

== Career ==
Urazaeva has been capped for the Belarus national team, appearing for the team during the 2019 FIFA Women's World Cup qualifying cycle.
