= Elisa Camporese =

Italian football midfielder (born 1984)

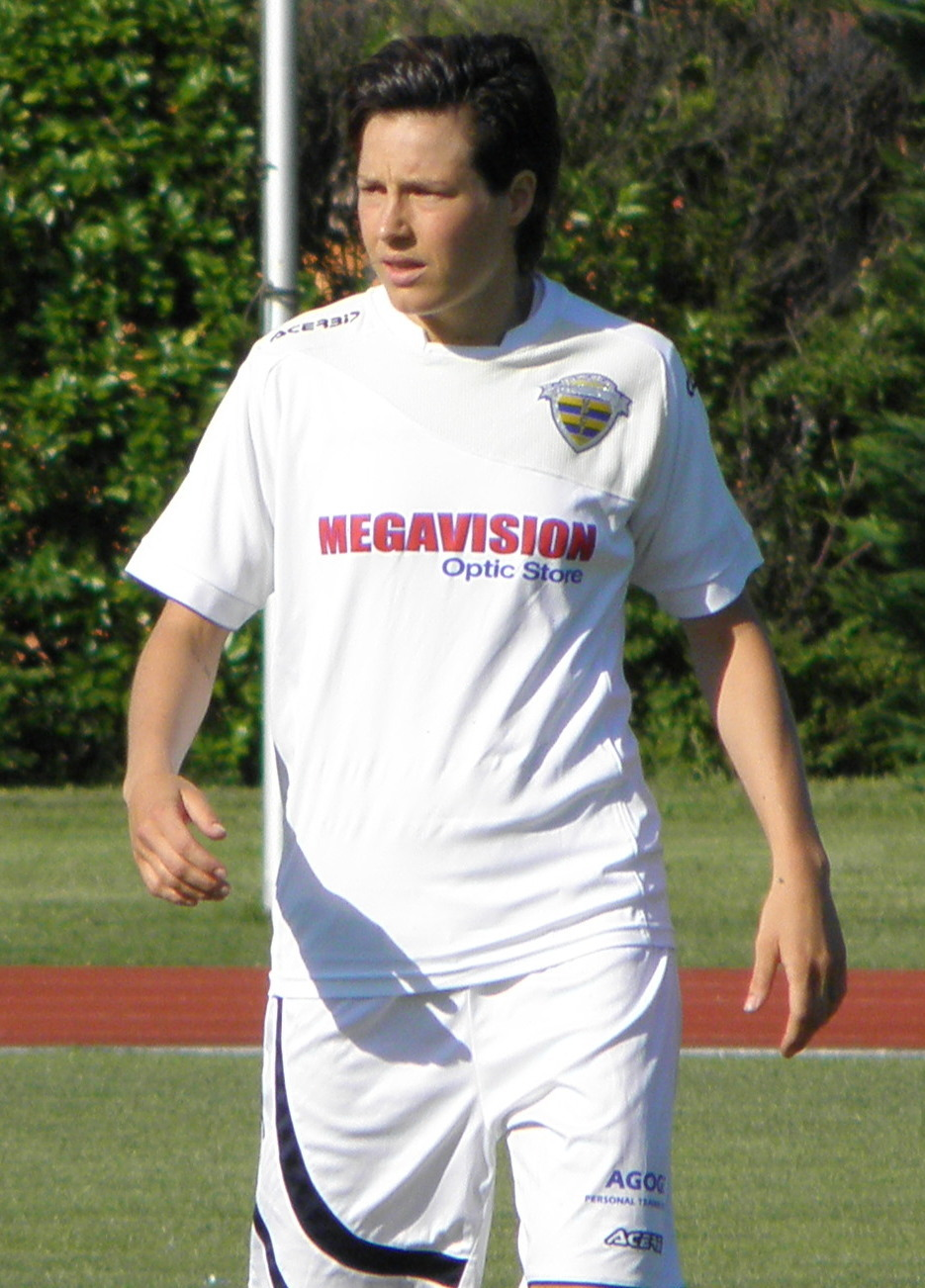
- Elisa Camporese in 2018

Personal information
- Full name: Elisa Camporese
- Date of birth: 16 March 1984 (age 42)
- Place of birth: Padua, Italy
- Height: 1.70 m (5 ft 7 in)
- Position: Midfielder

Team information
- Current team: St. Catharines Roma Wolves (head coach)

Senior career*
Years	Team	Apps	(Gls)
2001–2002	Bardolino CF		
2002–2004	Foroni Verona		
2004–2006	Bardolino CF		
2006–2010	UPC Tavagnacco		
2010–2011	Torres CF	23	(7)
2011–2019	UPC Tavagnacco		

International career
2001–2014	Italy	96	(24)

Managerial career
- 2024–: St. Catharines Roma Wolves (women)
- * Club domestic league appearances and goals

Elisa Camporese (born 16 March 1984) is an Italian former footballer, who currently serves as head coach of Canadian League1 Ontario club St. Catharines Roma Wolves.

She has won four leagues with Foroni Verona, CF Bardolino and Torres CF. As a member of the Italy women's national team, she played at the 2005 and 2013 editions of the UEFA Women's Championship. In April 2019 she made her final appearance for UPC Tavagnacco and retired from football.

== International career ==
Camporese made her senior debut for Italy on 10 October 2001, in a 3–1 home 2003 FIFA Women's World Cup qualification (UEFA) defeat by Russia. Included in the squad for UEFA Women's Euro 2005 in North West England, she played in all three games and scored in a 5–3 defeat by Norway as Italy made a group stage exit.

At UEFA Women's Euro 2009 in Finland, Camporese was not included in the squad as the Italians reached the quarter-finals. Four years later, national coach Antonio Cabrini named Camporese in his selection for UEFA Women's Euro 2013 in Sweden.

Goals scored for the Italian WNT in official competitions
Competition	Stage	Date	Location	Opponent	Goals	Result	Overall
2005 UEFA Euro	Qualifiers	2004–10–27	Čáslav	Czech Republic	1	3–0	2
2005 UEFA Euro	First Stage	2005–06–12	Preston	Norway	1	3–5	2
2011 FIFA World Cup	Qualifiers	2009–11–25	Francavilla	Armenia	1	7–0	5
2011 FIFA World Cup	Qualifiers	2010–03–27	Tocha	Portugal	1	3–1	5
2011 FIFA World Cup	Qualifiers	2010–06–19	Montereale	Slovenia	1	6–0	5
2011 FIFA World Cup	Qualifiers	2010–10–27	Aarau	Switzerland	2	4–2	5
2013 UEFA Euro	Qualifiers	2011–10–22	Prilep	North Macedonia	2	9–0	5
2013 UEFA Euro	Qualifiers	2011–11–19	Pruszków	Poland	1	5–0	5
2013 UEFA Euro	Qualifiers	2012–03–31	Ferrara	Bosnia and Herzegovina	1	4–0	5
2013 UEFA Euro	Qualifiers	2012–06–16	Turin	North Macedonia	1	9–0	5
2015 FIFA World Cup	Qualifiers	2014–09–17	Vercelli	North Macedonia	1	15–0	1

== Honours ==
Torres Calcio

- Serie A: 2010–11
- Italian Women's Cup: 2010–11
- Italian Women's Super Cup: 2010, 2011
