= Alexandra Bíróová =

Slovak footballer (born 1991)

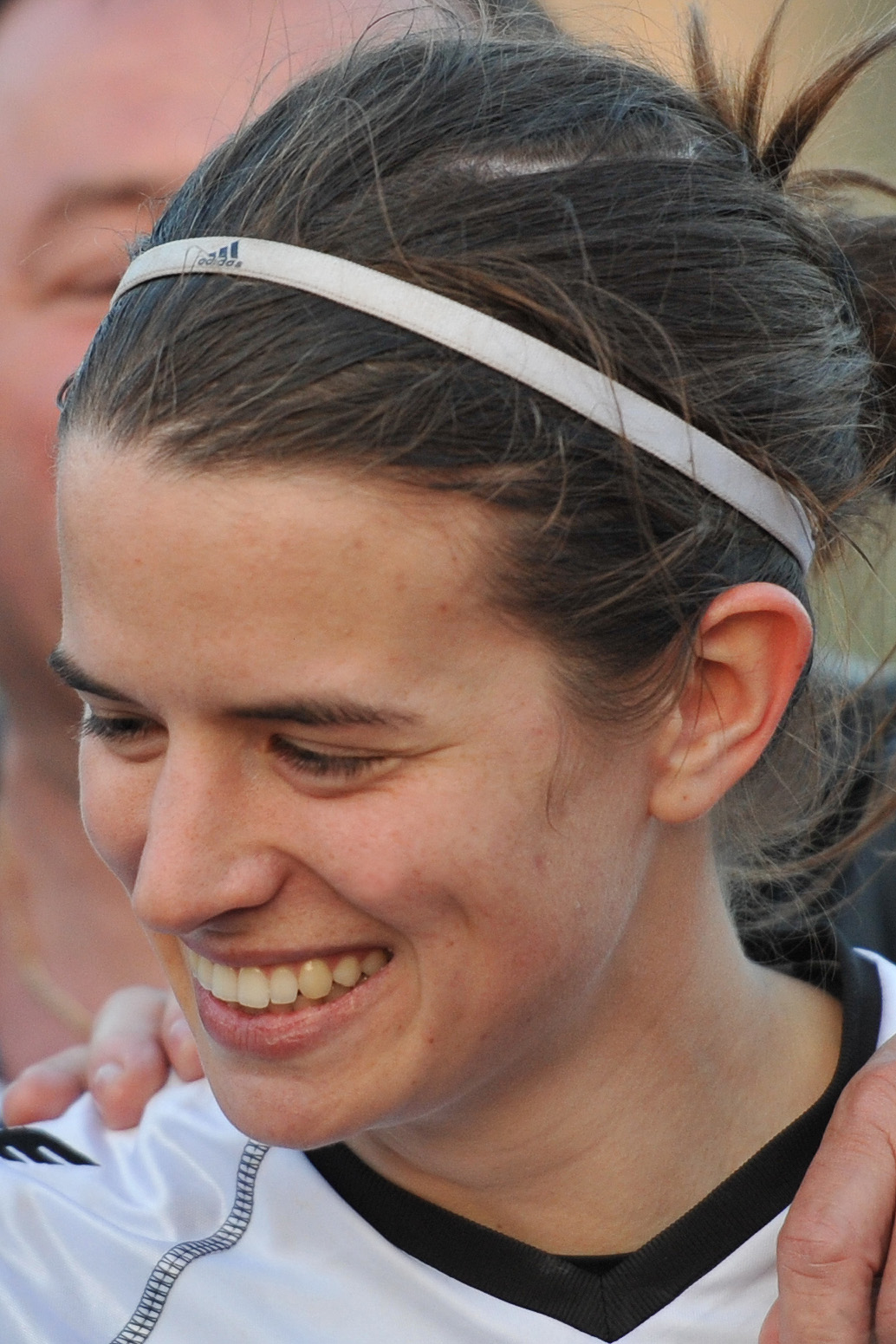
- Alexandra Bíróová in 2014

Personal information
- Full name: Alexandra Bíróová
- Date of birth: 13 July 1991 (age 35)
- Place of birth: Dunajská Streda, Czechoslovakia
- Height: 1.70 m (5 ft 7 in)
- Positions: Defender; midfielder

Team information
- Current team: SKN St. Pölten
- Number: 14

Senior career*
Years	Team	Apps	(Gls)
2007–2008	DAC Dunajská Streda		
2008–2009	Slovan Duslo Šaľa		
2009–2015	Neulengbach		
2015–	SKN St. Pölten		

International career
2011–2024	Slovakia	107	(6)
- * Club domestic league appearances and goals

Alexandra Bíróová (born 13 July 1991) is a Slovak football midfielder who currently plays for SKN St. Pölten of the Austrian Frauenliga. She has played in the UEFA Women's Champions League with her previous clubs Slovan Duslo Šaľa and SV Neulengbach.

She is a member of the Slovak national team. On 10 April 2021, Bíróová played her 100th match for Slovakia in a 0–0 draw with Mexico.

== International goals ==
Goals scored for the Slovak WNT in official competitions
Competition	Stage	Date	Location	Opponent	Goals	Result	Overall
2015 FIFA World Cup	Qualifiers	2014–05–08	Osnabrück	Germany	1	1–9	1
2017 UEFA Euro	Qualifiers	2015–10–22	Senec	Moldova	1	4–0	2
2017 UEFA Euro	Qualifiers	2015–12–01	Orhei	Moldova	1	4–0	2

== Titles ==
- ÖFB-Frauenliga (8): 2009–10 — 2013–14, 2015–16 — 2017–18
- ÖFB Ladies Cup (6): 2009–10 — 2011–12, 2015–16 — 2017–18
