= Dana Fecková =

Slovak footballer

Personal information
- Full name: Dana Fecková
- Date of birth: 26 February 1987 (age 39)
- Place of birth: Bratislava, Czechoslovakia (now Slovakia)
- Height: 1.72 m (5 ft 8 in)
- Position: Striker

Team information
- Current team: FC Neunkirch
- Number: 16

Senior career*
Years	Team	Apps	(Gls)
- Slovan Bratislava
2013–	FC Neunkirch		

International career
2006–	Slovakia		
- * Club domestic league appearances and goals

Dana Fecková (born 26 February 1987) is a Slovak footballer who plays as a striker for the Swiss club FC Neunkirch and the Slovakia national team.

She played club football for Slovan Bratislava, scoring the winning goal in the 2013 Slovak Women's Cup final, which Slovan won 2–1 against Nové Zámky.

== Career ==
=== National team ===
Season	Team	Competition	Minutes Played	Appearance	Lineups	Substitutions In	Substitutions Out	Substitutions On Bench	Goals	Yellow	Red
2017 Netherlands	Slovakia	UWC	270	3	3	0	0	0	3	0	0
2015 Canada	Slovakia	WWQ	808	9	9	0	1	1	0	0	0
2013 Sweden	Slovakia	UWC	705	8	8	0	1	0	0	0	0
2011 Germany	Slovakia	WWQ	694	8	8	0	3	0	6	0	0
		Total	2477	28	28	0	5	1	9	0	0

=== International Cups ===
Season	Team	Competition	Appearances	Goals
2012/2013	Slovan Bratislava	UWC	3	3
2011/2012	Slovan Bratislava	UWC	3	5
2010/2011	Slovan Bratislava	UWC	3	0
		Total	9	8
