= Alexandra Hurst =

Northern Ireland footballer (born 1994)

Personal information
- Full name: Alexandra Hurst
- Date of birth: 25 November 1994 (age 31)
- Place of birth: Northern Ireland
- Positions: Defender; midfielder

Senior career*
Years	Team	Apps	(Gls)
2012–2014	Newry City Ladies		
2014–2016	Bristol City		
2016–?	Swindon Town		

International career^{‡}
2011–2015	Northern Ireland	34	(0)
- * Club domestic league appearances and goals as of April 14, 2018 ‡ National team caps and goals as of April 14, 2018

Alexandra "Alex" Hurst (born 25 November 1994) is an association football defender and midfielder from Northern Ireland who played for the national football team from 2011 to 2015. She played for Newry City Ladies F.C., Swindon Town L.F.C., and Bristol City W.F.C.

== Honours ==
Bristol City

- FA WSL 2
  - Runners-up (1): 2016
