= Johanna Rasmussen =

Danish footballer (born 1983)

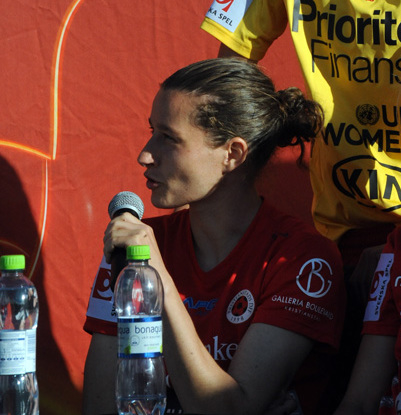
- Rasmussen in June 2013

Personal information
- Full name: Johanna Maria Baltensperger Rasmussen
- Date of birth: 2 July 1983 (age 43)
- Place of birth: Nykøbing Falster, Denmark
- Height: 1.67 m (5 ft 6 in)
- Position: Forward

Senior career*
Years	Team	Apps	(Gls)
–2002	B1921		
2002–2008	Fortuna Hjørring		
2008–2009	Umeå IK	42	(17)
2010	Atlanta Beat	19	(4)
2011	magicJack	8	(1)
2011–2017	Kristianstads	116	(28)
2017–2018	Linkopings	16	(4)

International career
2000–2002	Denmark U-19	22	(10)
2004	Denmark U-21	3	(0)
2002–2018	Denmark	153	(41)

Managerial career
- 2021–: Denmark (assistant)
- * Club domestic league appearances and goals

Johanna Maria Baltensperger Rasmussen (born 2 July 1983) is a Danish football manager and former professional footballer who played for the Denmark women's national football team. Rasmussen has served as the assistant manager for Denmark since 2021.

Rasmussen last played for Linköpings FC in the Damallsvenskan. She was nominated for the Denmark Women's Player of the Year award in 2008. She played as a forward and wore the number 13 shirt for Denmark.

== Club career ==
In February 2002 Rasmussen was reported to be joining Texas Tech University on a soccer scholarship. Instead she moved to Fortuna Hjørring in summer 2002.

Rasmussen represented Fortuna Hjørring in both legs of the 2003 UEFA Women's Cup Final, a 1–7 aggregate defeat to Umeå IK of Sweden. After 125 appearances for Fortuna, Rasmussen signed a contract with Umeå IK ahead of the Swedish 2008 season.

In 2010 Rasmussen followed Umeå teammates Ramona Bachmann and Mami Yamaguchi to the American Women's Professional Soccer (WPS) league, playing the 2010 season with Atlanta Beat who finished last. She began the following campaign with magicJack, but after scoring once in eight appearances negotiated a release from her contract to return to Europe.

She signed with Kristianstads DFF in August 2011. Rasmussen moved to league champions Linköpings FC ahead of the 2017 season, but suffered a serious knee injury shortly afterwards.

== International career ==
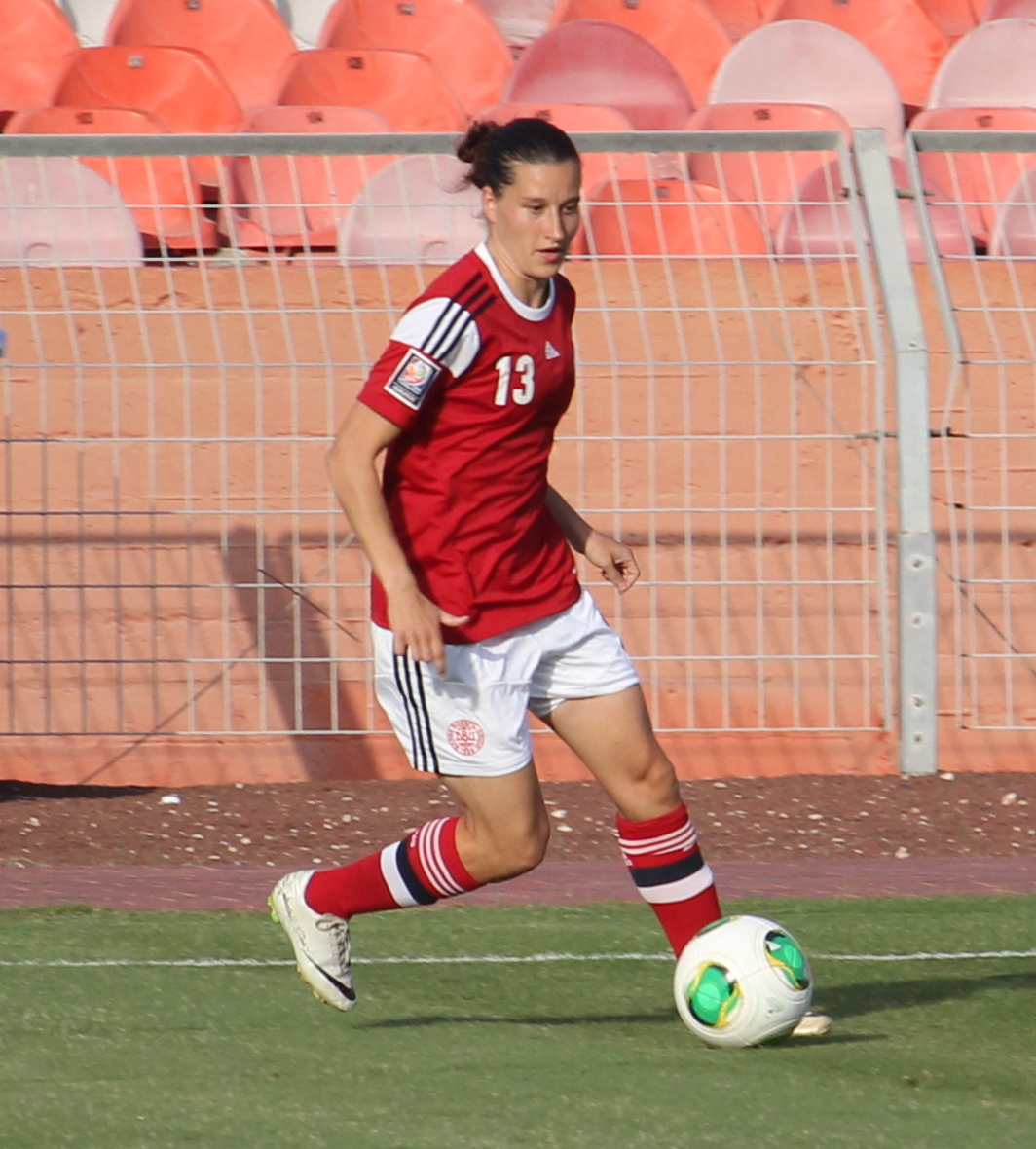
With Denmark in 2014

Rasmussen made her senior international debut in October 2002, in a 2–0 defeat to Germany in Ulm. She went on to play at UEFA Women's Euro 2005 in North West England, the 2007 FIFA Women's World Cup in China and UEFA Women's Euro 2009 in Finland. Rasmussen won her 100th cap for Denmark in March 2013.

She was named in national coach Kenneth Heiner-Møller's Denmark squad for UEFA Women's Euro 2013. In Denmark's opening group match against hosts Sweden Rasmussen featured in an eventful 1–1 draw.

== Managerial career ==
Rasmussen was hired part-time as assistant coach for the Denmark women's national football team under head coach Lars Søndergaard in 2021. In 2022, the Danish Football Association made the position full-time for the first time in the history of the Danish women's national team. She renewed her contract in September 2023 and became the assistant manager to Andrée Jeglertz when he succeeded Søndergaard the same year.

Rasmussen completed her pro licence in August 2025, only the fifth woman in Danish football history to do so. She renewed her contract with the national team in October 2025, extending her position until summer 2027. On 23 October 2025, Rasmussen became the temporary caretaker manager for the national team due to the sudden unavailability of the manager. On 24 October, Rasmussen coached her first game as manager, leading the team to a 6–1 victory over Finland in Tampere, becoming the first ever female coach for a Danish national football team.

== Personal life ==
Rasmussen was a childhood chess champion.

== Career statistics ==
Incomplete

=== International ===
Year	Date	Location	Opponent	Goals (Note: Goals always noted with Denmark's result first, whether home or away, win or loss.)	Result	Competition
2004	6 November	Lincoln Financial Field, USA	United States	1	3–1	Friendly
2005	5 June	Bloomfield Road, England	Sweden	1	1–1	2005 Euros
2005	10 November	La Ciudad del Fútbol, Spain	Spain	1	2–2	2007 World Cup qualification
2006	27 April	Viborg Stadium, Denmark	Spain	1	5–0	2007 World Cup qualification
2006	2 November	Suwon World Cup Stadium, South Korea	Australia	1	2–1	2006 Peace Queen Cup

== See also ==
- List of women's footballers with 100 or more international caps
