= Tocha, Portugal =

Tocha
- Civil parish
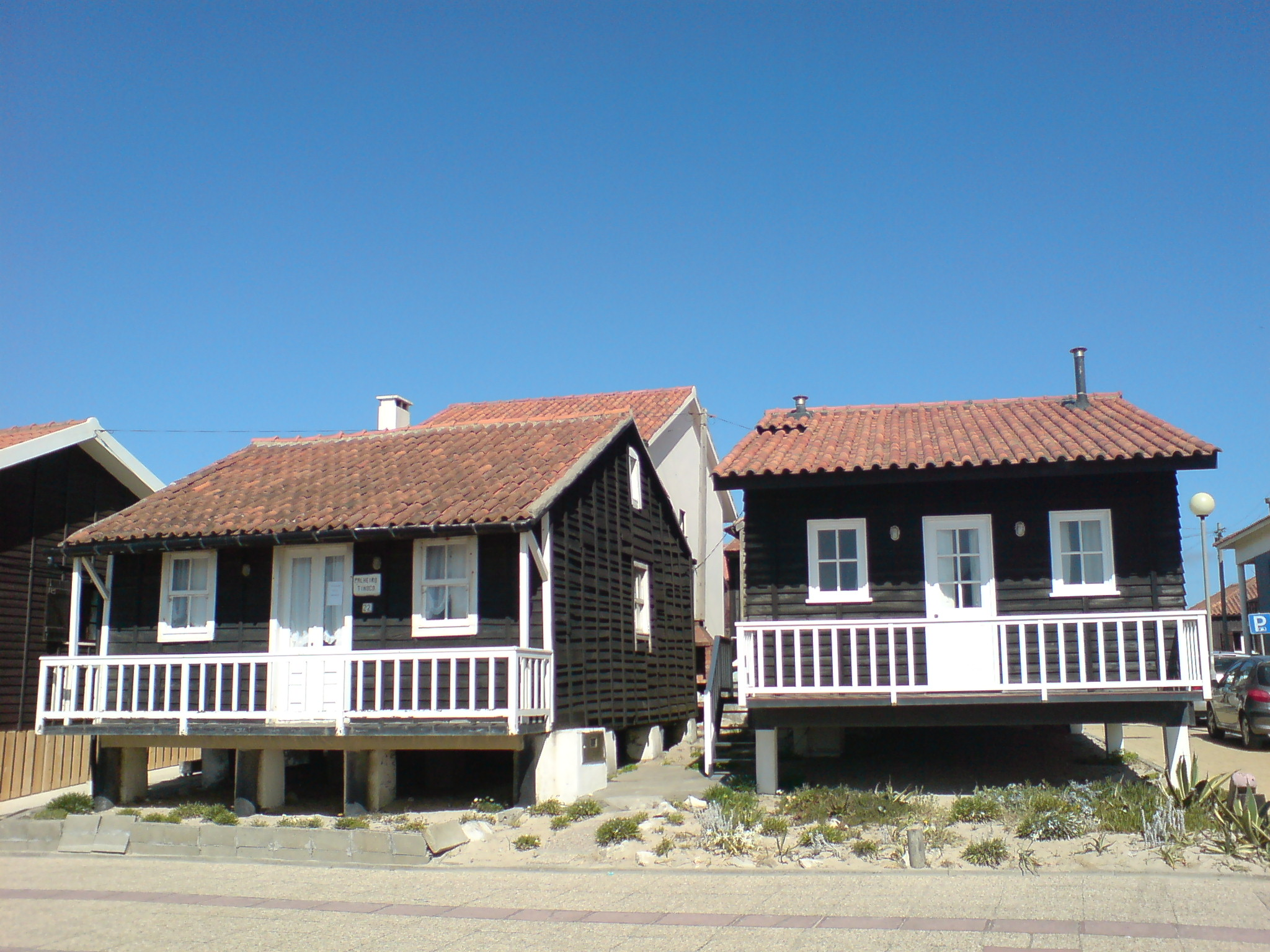
- Typical fisherman house in Praia da Tocha

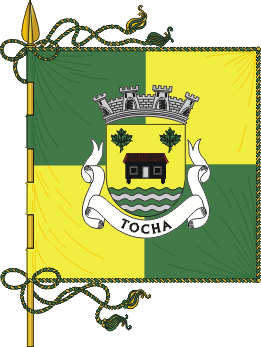
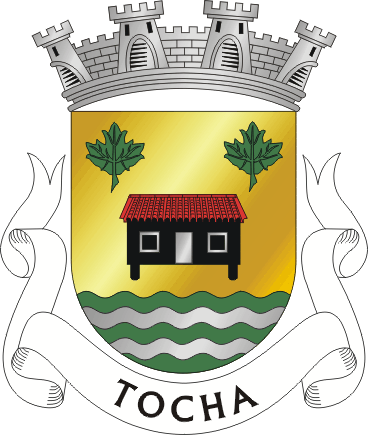
- Flag Coat of arms

- Location in Portugal
- Coordinates: 40.314°N 8.753°W
- Country: Portugal
- Region: Centro
- Intermunic. comm.: Região de Coimbra
- District: Coimbra
- Municipality: Cantanhede

Area
  - Total: 78.44 km^{2} (30.29 sq mi)

Population (2011)
  - Total: 3,992
  - Density: 50.89/km^{2} (131.8/sq mi)
- Time zone: UTC+00:00 (WET)
  - Summer (DST): UTC+01:00 (WEST)
- Website: freguesiadetocha.pt

Tocha is a civil parish in the municipality of Cantanhede, Portugal. The population in 2011 was 3,992, in an area of 78.44 km^{2} (30.29 sq mi).
