= Scotland women's national football team results (2000–2009) =

This article lists the results of the Scotland women's national football team from 2000 to 2009. The list excludes unofficial matches, where the opposition did not have full international status or it was played behind closed doors. For example, Scotland played the Isle of Man in the Celt Cup and a United States under-18 team in the 2000 Albena Cup.

== 2000 ==
26 Feb 2000	France	1–2	Scotland	Auch

2 Apr 2000 Albena Cup	Moldova	0–5	Scotland	Varna

3 Apr 2000 Albena Cup	Ukraine	3–3	Scotland	Varna

7 Apr 2000 Albena Cup	Scotland	2–0	Romania	Varna

29 Apr 2000 Euro 2001 qualifier	Republic of Ireland	0–3	Scotland	Dublin

14 May 2000 Euro 2001 qualifier	Scotland	4–1	Croatia	Forthbank Stadium, Stirling

11 Aug 2000	Netherlands	3–2	Scotland	Hilversum

13 Aug 2000	Belgium	4–3	Scotland	Etten Leur

26 Aug 2000 Euro 2001 qualifier	Czech Republic	5–1	Scotland	Chmel Blšany, Blšany

18 Sep 2000 Veenendaal	Netherlands	3–1	Scotland	Sportpark Panhuis, Veenendaal
	Torny 3'; Griffioen 45' (pen.); Smith 90'		Fleeting 8'	Referee: H. van Beek (Netherlands)

19 Sep 2000 Veenendaal	Scotland	2–2	Belarus	Sportpark Panhuis, Veenendaal
	Fleeting 39', 75'		Ryzhevitch 12'; Astachova 26'	Referee: Regina Belksma-Konink (Netherlands)

22 Sep 2000 Celt Cup	Republic of Ireland	1–0	Scotland	Carryduff
	Thorpe

29 Nov 2000	Scotland	9–0	Northern Ireland	David Keswick Athletic Centre Dumfries

== 2001 ==
17 Mar 2001	France	5–0	Scotland	Quimper

10 May 2001	Scotland	0–2	Netherlands	Almondvale Stadium, Livingston

27 May 2001	England	1–0	Scotland	Reebok Stadium, Bolton

11 August 2001 Friendly	Republic of Ireland	1–2	Scotland	AUL Complex
	O'Toole (?)	Report

12 August 2001 Friendly	Republic of Ireland	4–1	Scotland	AUL Complex
	O'Toole (?)	Report

29 Sep 2001 World Cup qualifier	Austria	1–2	Scotland	Leopoldsdorf
	Stallinger 21'		James 51'; Gilmour 74'

28 Oct 2001 World Cup qualifier	Scotland	5–1	Wales	Almondvale Stadium, Livingston
	Fleeting 10', 34', 68', 75'; James 47'		Ludlow 8'

25 Nov 2001 World Cup qualifier	Belgium	3–2	Scotland	Sint Niklaas
	Carnol 29', 33', 88'		Brown 88'; Kerr 90'

== 2002 ==
1 Mar 2002 2002 Algarve Cup	Canada	3–0	Scotland	Quarteira
	Neil 19', 25', 30'

3 Mar 2002 2002 Algarve Cup	Portugal	1–2	Scotland	Lagoa
	Couto 37'		Fleeting 14', 90'

5 Mar 2002 2002 Algarve Cup	Wales	0–1	Scotland	Silves
			Fleeting 25'

7 Mar 2002 2002 Algarve Cup	England	4–1	Scotland	Quarteira
	Walker; Exley 42'; Williams; Burke 70'		Cook 25'

21 Apr 2002 World Cup qualifier	Scotland	4–0	Belgium	Almondvale Stadium, Livingston
	McWhinnie 20'; Fleeting 42', 53'; Cook 44'

5 May 2002 World Cup qualifier	Scotland	5–0	Austria	Almondvale Stadium, Livingston
	Fleeting 11', 19', 51'; Cook 33'; Hamill 89'

19 May 2002 World Cup qualifier	Wales	0–2	Scotland	Merthyr Tydfil
			James 54'; Fleeting 81'

8 Sep 2002 Friendly	United States	8–2	Scotland	Columbus Crew Stadium, Columbus
	Parlow 12'; Hamm 34' 50' 68'; Wambach 46' 64' 89'; MacMillan 78'	Report	Fleeting 33'; McWhinnie 36'

15 Dec 2002 Friendly	Netherlands	0–0	Scotland	Albufeira

18 Dec 2002 Friendly	Portugal	0–2	Scotland	Lagoa

== 2003 ==
22 Jan 2003	Italy	4–1	Scotland	Rome

10 Mar 2003 Friendly	Scotland	0–1	China	City Stadium, Livingston

27 Mar 2003 Euro 2005 qualifier	Germany	5–0	Scotland	Potsdam
	Prinz 25', 69'; Grings 40', 58', 65'

1 May 2003	Scotland	0–0	Belgium	City Stadium, Livingston

18 May 2003 Euro 2005 qualifier	Scotland	5–1	Ukraine	City Stadium, Livingston
	Ralph 37'; Brown 66'; Fleeting 76', 87', 90'		Khodyreva 20'

7 Jun 2003 Euro 2005 qualifier	Portugal	1–8	Scotland	Nelas
	I. Silva 64'		Brown 7', 13', 22'; Fleeting 30', 33', 43', 68', 75'

12 Aug 2003	Greece	0–2	Scotland	Patras

6 Sep 2003 Friendly	Scotland	0–1	Australia	City Stadium, Livingston

9 Sep 2003 Friendly	Scotland	0–4	Italy	City Stadium, Livingston

1 Oct 2003 Friendly	Scotland	0–2	Netherlands	City Stadium, Livingston

19 Oct 2003 Euro 2005 qualifier	Czech Republic	2–0	Scotland	Kravare
	Šcasná 45'; Mouchová 72'

13 Nov 2003	England	5–0	Scotland	Deepdale, Preston

== 2004 ==
15 Jan 2004	Greece	1–1	Scotland	Athens

17 Jan 2004	Greece	0–3	Scotland	Athens

18 Feb 2004	France	1–1	Scotland	Sete

21 Feb 2004	France	6–3	Scotland	Montpellier

10 Mar 2004	Iceland	5–1	Scotland	Reykjavík

10 Apr 2004 Euro 2005 qualifier	Ukraine	1–0	Scotland	Simferopol
	Djatel 89'

2 May 2004 Euro 2005 qualifier	Scotland	1–3	Germany	Almondvale Stadium, Livingston
	Fleeting 58'		Garefrekes 29'; Prinz 75'; Müller 79'

23 May 2004 Euro 2005 qualifier	Scotland	2–1	Portugal	Almondvale Stadium, Livingston
	Grant 43'; Hamill 57'		S. Silva 87'

19 Aug 2004	Scotland	6–0	Switzerland	Victoria Park, Dingwall

5 Sep 2004 Euro 2005 qualifier	Scotland	3–2	Czech Republic	Victoria Park, Dingwall
	Malone 11'; Fleeting 82'; Jones 89'		Mocová 58', 71'

== 2005 ==
21 Apr 2005	England	2–1	Scotland	Prenton Park, Birkenhead

20 May 2005	Finland	2–0	Scotland	Turku

25 May 2005	Scotland	0–2	Iceland	McDiarmid Park, Perth

31 Jul 2005	Scotland	2–1	Northern Ireland	McDiarmid Park, Perth

28 Aug 2005 World Cup qualifier	Russia	6–0	Scotland	Moskvich Stadium, Moscow
	Morozova 13'; Barbashina 24'; Skotnikova 25'; Danilova 52'; Letyushova 82'; Savchenkova 84'	Report		Referee: Marianne Svendsen (Denmark)

25 Sep 2005 World Cup qualifier	Scotland	0–0	Republic of Ireland	McDiarmid Park, Perth
		Report		Referee: Silvia Tea Spinelli (Italy)

20 Oct 2005 World Cup qualifier	Germany	4–0	Scotland	Hans-Walter Wild Stadion, Bayreuth
	Grings 24'; Stegemann 57'; Prinz 61', 78'	UEFA; DFB		Attendance: 15,504; Referee: Anri Hänninen (Finland)

== 2006 ==
8 Mar 2006 Torneo Molise	Italy	4–0	Scotland	Stadio Le Piane, Isernia
	Tona 50', 60'; Marsico 66'; Comporese 93'

10 Mar 2006 Torneo Molise	Japan	4–0	Scotland	Stadio Civitelle, Agnone
	Sakai 30'; Sawa 52'; Ando 68'; Arakawa 79'

26 Apr 2006 World Cup qualifier	Scotland	1–0	Switzerland	McDiarmid Park, Perth
	Grant 61'	Report		Referee: Paula Thörn (Sweden)

6 May 2006 World Cup qualifier	Republic of Ireland	0–2	Scotland	Richmond Park, Dublin
		Report	Love 47'; Fleeting 81'	Referee: Rachel Cohen (Israel)

24 May 2006 World Cup qualifier	Scotland	0–4	Russia	McDiarmid Park, Perth
			Morozova; Kurochkina; Savchenkova

3 Aug 2006 Friendly	Scotland	0–0	Finland	McDiarmid Park, Perth

26 Aug 2006 World Cup qualifier	Switzerland	1–1	Scotland	Schlossfeld Stadium, Willisau
	Gailard 17' (pen.)	Report	Fleeting 71'	Attendance: 625; Referee: Elia Maria Martinez (Spain)

6 Sep 2006 Friendly	Belgium	0–3	Scotland	RJ Wavre, Wavre
		Report	Grant 25'; McDonald; Fleeting 79'

23 Sep 2006 World Cup qualifier	Scotland	0–5	Germany	McDiarmid Park, Perth
		Report	Prinz 26', 53'; Lingor 36'; Garefrekes 44'; Smisek 67'	Referee: Mihaela Basimamovic (Croatia)

== 2007 ==
14 Feb 2007 Friendly	Japan	2–0	Scotland	Dasaki Stadium, Achna
	Sakaguchi 43', 70'	Report

17 Feb 2007 Friendly	Sweden	1–0	Scotland	Ammochostos Stadium, Larnaca
	Fischer 80'	Report

11 Mar 2007 Friendly	England	1–0	Scotland	Adams Park, High Wycombe
	Williams 30'	Report

6 Apr 2007 Friendly	Scotland	2–1	Italy	McDiarmid Park, Perth
	Fleeting 67'; Hamill 75'	Report

6 May 2007 Euro 2009 qualifier	Scotland	0–0	Portugal	McDiarmid Park, Perth
		Report		Referee: Nadezhda Ulyanovskaya (Russia)

30 May 2007 Euro 2009 qualifier	Ukraine	2–1	Scotland	Illichivetz Stadium, Mariupol
	Zinchenko 44'; Chorna 67'		Fleeting 68'	Referee: Snjezana Focic (Croatia)

26 Aug 2007 Friendly	Scotland	3–2	Belgium	McDiarmid Park, Perth
	Fleeting 61', 65' (pen.), 67'	Report	Verelst 55', 83'

26 Sep 2007 Friendly	Finland	1–0	Scotland	Veritas Stadion, Turku

29 Sep 2007 Friendly	Finland	4–1	Scotland	Olympiastadion, Helsinki
			Fleeting 24'

27 Oct 2007 Euro 2009 qualifier	Slovakia	0–3	Scotland	NTC Senec, Senec
			Kerr 3'; Hamill 17'; Fleeting 72'	Referee: Bibiana Steinhaus (Germany)

31 Oct 2007 Euro 2009 qualifier	Scotland	0–1	Denmark	McDiarmid Park, Perth
			M. Pedersen 62'	Referee: Anouk De Jong (Netherlands)

== 2008 ==
5 Mar 2008 2008 Cyprus Cup	Scotland	1–2	United States	Paralimni Stadium, Paralimni
	Grant 87'	Scottish FA

7 Mar 2008 2008 Cyprus Cup	Netherlands	1–0	Scotland	Paralimni Stadium, Paralimni
		Scottish FA

10 Mar 2008 2008 Cyprus Cup	Canada	0–2	Scotland	Alpha Sports Centre, Larnaca
		Scottish FA	Love 67'; Hamill 80'

12 Mar 2008 2008 Cyprus Cup	Scotland	2–3	Russia	GSP Stadium, Nicosia
	Little 21'; Thomson 87'	Scottish FA

9 Apr 2008 Friendly	Belgium	0–1	Scotland	Tienen
		Scottish FA	A. Timmermans 83' (o.g.)

27 Apr 2008 Euro 2009 qualifier	Denmark	2–1	Scotland	Viborg Stadion, Viborg
	Andersen 50'; M Pedersen 67'	Scottish FA	Sneddon 28'	Referee: Silvia Tea Spinelli (Italy)

3 May 2008 Euro 2009 qualifier	Portugal	1–4	Scotland	Municipal Stadium, Póvoa de Varzim
	Fernandes 44'	Scottish FA	Beattie 12'; Fleeting 20', 25', 39'	Referee: Sabine Bonnin (France)

28 May 2008 Euro 2009 qualifier	Scotland	0–1	Ukraine	McDiarmid Park, Perth
		Scottish FA	Apanaschenko 9'	Referee: Tanja Schett (Austria)

24 Aug 2008 Friendly	Finland	3–0	Scotland	Jakobstad
		Scottish FA

27 Aug 2008 Friendly	Finland	1–1	Scotland	Vaasa
		Scottish FA	McBride 35'

17 Sep 2008 Friendly	Scotland	4–0	Switzerland	McDiarmid Park, Perth
	Fleeting 28', 39'; McBride 88'; Little 89'	Scottish FA

28 Sep 2008 Euro 2009 qualifier	Scotland	6–0	Slovakia	McDiarmid Park, Perth
	Beattie 26'; Fleeting 32', 68'; Hamill 40'; Little 52'; Grant 87'	Scottish FA		Referee: Cristina Dorcioman (Romania)

26 Oct 2008 Euro 2009 play-off	Scotland	2–3	Russia	Tynecastle Stadium, Edinburgh
	Hamill 3', 13'	Scottish FA	Kurochkina 4'; Mokshanova 32' (pen.); Barbashina 76'	Referee: Floarea Cristina Ionescu (Romania)

30 Oct 2008 Euro 2009 play-off	Russia	1–2	Scotland	Spartak Stadium, Nalchik
	Dieke 20' (o.g.)	Scottish FA	Hamill 64'; Beattie 85'	Referee: Gyöngyi Gaal Hungary

== 2009 ==
5 Mar 2009 Cyprus Cup Group A	France	2–0	Scotland	Ammochostos Stadium, Larnaca
14:45	Delphine Blanc 69'; Eugénie Le Sommer 83'	Scottish FA

7 Mar 2009 Cyprus Cup Group A	South Africa	2–0	Scotland	GSP Stadium, Nicosia
14:45	Noko Matlou 75'; Hlengiwe Ngwane 86'

10 Mar 2009 Cyprus Cup Group A	Scotland	0–3	England	GSZ Stadium, Larnaca
14:45		Scottish FA	40' Eniola Aluko; 66' Emily Westwood; 83' Jessica Clarke

12 Mar 2009 7th/8th place play-off	Scotland	2–1	Russia	GSP Stadium, Nicosia
12:00	Suzanne Grant 21'; Pauline Hamill 27'		44' Ekaterina Sochneva

8 Apr 2009 Challenge match	Scotland	1–4	Italy	Rugby Park, Kilmarnock
19:30	Pauline Hamill 87' (pen.)	Scottish FA	19' Tatiana Zorri; 47' Elisabetta Tona; 72' Raffaella Manieri; 74' Evelyn Vicchiarello	Attendance: 1,811

12 May 2009 Challenge match	Scotland	3–1	Northern Ireland	Forthbank Stadium, Stirling
18:15	Pauline Hamill 60', 81'; Joelle Murray 83'	Scottish FA	Rachel Furness	Attendance: 817

12 Aug 2009 Challenge match	France	4–0	Scotland	Stade des Grands Pres, Chartres
	Élise Bussaglia 36'; Élodie Thomis 45'; Candie Herbert 68'; Sandrine Brétigny 90'	Scottish FA		Attendance: 1,138

14 Aug 2009 Challenge match	Denmark	5–2	Scotland	Gladsaxe Stadium, Søborg
	Maiken Pape 8', 34', 53'; Johanna Rasmussen 45'; Cathrine Paaske Sørensen 90'	Scottish FA	78' Jane Ross; 81' Kirsty McBride

9 Sep 2009 Challenge match	Switzerland	0–0	Scotland	GC Campus, Niederhasli
17:30		Scottish FA

15 Oct 2009 Challenge match	Northern Ireland	0–3	Scotland	The Oval, Belfast
		Scottish FA	33' Rachel Corsie; 79' Suzanne Grant; 90+3' Jane Ross

24 Oct 2009 WCQ Group 3	Greece	0–1	Scotland	Yiannis Pathiakakis Stadium, Ano Liossia
16:00 UTC+3		Scottish FA	53' Jen Beattie	Referee: Tanja Schett (Austria)

29 Oct 2009 WCQ Group 3	Scotland	3–1	Georgia	Tynecastle Stadium, Edinburgh
19:30 UTC	Suzanne Grant 50', 80'; Kim Little 51'	Scottish FA	59' Ana Pogosian	Referee: Dilan Gökçek (Turkey)

== See also ==
- Scotland women's national football team 1972–99 results
- Scotland women's national football team 2010–19 results
- Scotland women's national football team 2020–29 results
