= Scotland women's national football team results (2010–2019) =

Scotland women's national football team results
- 1972–99
- 2000–09
- 2010–19
- 2020–present

This article lists the results and fixtures for the Scotland women's national football team from 2010 to 2019.

== Key ==
Key to matches

- Att. = Match attendance
- (H) = Home ground
- (A) = Away ground
- (N) = Neutral ground

== Results ==
Scotland's score is shown first in each case.

| Date | Venue | Opponents | Score | Competition | Scotland scorers | Att. | Ref. |
|---|---|---|---|---|---|---|---|
| 24 February 2010 | GSP Stadium, Nicosia (N) | Netherlands | 1–4 | 2010 Cyprus Cup | Suzanne Grant | | |
| 26 February 2010 | GSZ Stadium, Larnaca (N) | Italy | 0–2 | 2010 Cyprus Cup | | | |
| 1 March 2010 | GSZ Stadium, Larnaca (N) | New Zealand | 0–3 | 2010 Cyprus Cup | | | |
| 3 March 2010 | GSZ Stadium, Larnaca (N) | South Africa | 2–1 | 2010 Cyprus Cup | Hayley Lauder, Kim Little | | |
| 27 March 2010 | Mikheil Meskhi Stadium, Tbilisi (A) | Georgia | 3–1 | 2011 World Cup qualifying | Jen Beattie, Rachel Corsie, Leanne Ross | | |
| 1 April 2010 | Falkirk Stadium, Falkirk (H) | Bulgaria | 8–1 | 2011 World Cup qualifying | Kim Little (2), Pauline Hamill, Julie Fleeting (4), Suzanne Grant | | |
| 23 May 2010 | Dumbarton Football Stadium, Dumbarton (H) | Northern Ireland | 2–0 | Friendly match | Emma Fernon, Kim Little | | |
| 5 June 2010 | Stadion Niedermatten, Wohlen (A) | Switzerland | 3–3 | Friendly match | Kim Little (2), Pauline Hamill | 300 | |
| 8 June 2010 | Herti Allmend Stadion, Zug (A) | Switzerland | 1–0 | Friendly match | Julie Fleeting | 350 | |
| 19 June 2010 | Georgi Asparuhov Stadium, Sofia (A) | Bulgaria | 5–0 | 2011 World Cup qualifying | Jen Beattie, Julie Fleeting, Kim Little, Rachel Corsie, Pauline Hamill | 100 | |
| 24 June 2010 | Rugby Park, Kilmarnock (H) | Denmark | 0–1 | 2011 World Cup qualifying | | | |
| 23 July 2010 | Stadion Miejski, Proszowice (A) | Poland | 2–1 | Friendly match | Kim Little (2) | 900 | |
| 21 August 2010 | Dumbarton Football Stadium, Dumbarton (H) | Greece | 4–1 | 2011 World Cup qualifying | Jen Beattie, Julie Fleeting, Rachel Corsie, Suzanne Grant | | |
| 25 August 2010 | Vejle Stadion, Vejle (A) | Denmark | 0–0 | 2011 World Cup qualifying | | | |
| 13 February 2011 | Bridge Meadow Stadium, Haverfordwest (A) | Wales | 4–2 | Friendly match | Jane Ross, Hayley Lauder (2), Joanne Love | | |
| 2 March 2011 | Ammochostos Stadium, Larnaca (N) | Canada | 0–1 | 2011 Cyprus Cup | | | |
| 4 March 2011 | GSP Stadium, Nicosia (N) | England | 2–0 | 2011 Cyprus Cup | Kim Little, Jen Beattie | | |
| 7 March 2011 | GSZ Stadium, Larnaca (N) | Italy | 0–0 | 2011 Cyprus Cup | | | |
| 9 March 2011 | GSP Stadium, Nicosia (N) | France | 0–3 | 2011 Cyprus Cup | | | |
| 3 April 2011 | Kras Stadion, Volendam (A) | Netherlands | 2–6 | Friendly match | Suzanne Lappin, Leanne Ross | | |
| 18 May 2011 | Stade Francis-Le Blé, Brest (A) | France | 1–1 | Friendly match | Jane Ross | | |
| 21 August 2011 | Falkirk Stadium, Falkirk (H) | Switzerland | 5–0 | Friendly match | Jane Ross (2), Julie Fleeting, Kim Little, Jen Beattie | 531 | |
| 23 August 2011 | Falkirk Stadium, Falkirk (H) | Belgium | 1–0 | Friendly match | Julie Fleeting | | |
| 18 September 2011 | Sonera Stadium, Helsinki (A) | Finland | 0–1 | Friendly match | | | |
| 21 September 2011 | Tynecastle Stadium, Edinburgh (H) | Finland | 7–2 | Friendly match | Hayley Lauder, Jen Beattie (2), Jane Ross (2), Rachel Corsie, Own goal | | |
| 12 October 2011 | Ness Ziona Stadium, Ness Ziona (A) | Israel | 6–1 | Euro 2013 qualifying | Jane Ross, Jen Beattie, Kim Little (2), Hayley Lauder, Own goal | 130 | |
| 27 October 2011 | Tynecastle Stadium, Edinburgh (H) | Wales | 2–2 | Euro 2013 qualifying | Jane Ross, Jen Beattie | 1,061 | |
| 5 February 2012 | Solitude, Belfast (A) | Northern Ireland | 5–1 | Friendly match | Jen Beattie (4), Lisa Evans | | |
| 28 February 2012 | GSZ Stadium, Larnaca (N) | Canada | 1–5 | 2012 Cyprus Cup | Jane Ross | | |
| 1 March 2012 | GSP Stadium, Nicosia (N) | Netherlands | 2–1 | 2012 Cyprus Cup | Own goal, Hayley Lauder | | |
| 4 March 2012 | GSZ Stadium, Larnaca (N) | Italy | 1–2 | 2012 Cyprus Cup | Leanne Ross | | |
| 6 March 2012 | Paralimni Stadium, Paralimni (N) | South Africa | 2–0 | 2012 Cyprus Cup | Kim Little (2) | | |
| 31 March 2011 | Stade Jules Deschaseaux, Le Havre (A) | France | 0–2 | Euro 2013 qualifying | | 9,028 | |
| 5 April 2012 | Tynecastle Stadium, Edinburgh (H) | Republic of Ireland | 2–1 | Euro 2013 qualifying | Rhonda Jones, Christie Murray | 1,703 | |
| 9 May 2012 | Stadion Kazimierza Deyny, Starogard Gdański (A) | Poland | 3–1 | Friendly match | Lisa Evans, Jane Ross, Own goal | | |
| 26 May 2012 | Stark's Park, Kirkcaldy (H) | Sweden | 1–4 | Friendly match | Kim Little | 1,184 | |
| 16 June 2012 | Tynecastle Stadium, Edinburgh (H) | Israel | 8–0 | Euro 2013 qualifying | Hayley Lauder, Kim Little (3), Megan Sneddon, Joanne Love, Jane Ross, Rachel Corsie | 817 | |
| 21 June 2012 | Turners Cross, Cork (A) | Republic of Ireland | 1–0 | Euro 2013 qualifying | Rachel Corsie | 827 | |
| 15 July 2012 | Chris Anderson Stadium, Aberdeen (H) | Cameroon | 2–0 | Friendly match | Own goal, Joanne Love | | |
| 4 August 2012 | Cappielow Park, Greenock (H) | Iceland | 1–1 | Friendly match | Emma Mitchell | 412 | |
| 30 August 2012 | East End Park, Dunfermline (H) | Norway | 2–2 | Friendly match | Emma Mitchell, Sarah Crilly | | |
| 15 September 2012 | Parc y Scarlets, Llanelli (A) | Wales | 2–1 | Euro 2013 qualifying | Joanne Love, Kim Little | | |
| 19 September 2012 | Tynecastle Stadium, Edinburgh (H) | France | 0–5 | Euro 2013 qualifying | | 731 | |
| 20 October 2012 | Hampden Park, Glasgow (H) | Spain | 1–1 | Euro 2013 qualifying | Kim Little | 4,058 | |
| 24 October 2012 | La Ciudad del Fútbol, Las Rozas (A) | Spain | 2–3 | Euro 2013 qualifying | Emma Mitchell, Kim Little | | |
| 9 February 2013 | EverBank Field, Jacksonville (A) | United States | 1–4 | Friendly match | Kim Little | 18,565 | |
| 14 February 2013 | LP Field, Nashville (A) | United States | 1–3 | Friendly match | Suzanne Grant | 14,224 | |
| 6 March 2013 | GSP Stadium, Nicosia (N) | New Zealand | 0–1 | 2013 Cyprus Cup | | | |
| 8 March 2013 | GSZ Stadium, Larnaca (N) | England | 4–4 | 2013 Cyprus Cup | Lisa Evans, Jane Ross, Kim Little, Emma Mitchell | | |
| 11 March 2013 | GSZ Stadium, Larnaca (N) | Italy | 2–1 | 2013 Cyprus Cup | Jane Ross, Rhonda Jones | | |
| 13 March 2013 | GSP Stadium, Nicosia (N) | Netherlands | 1–0 | 2013 Cyprus Cup | Kim Little | | |
| 7 April 2013 | East End Park, Dunfermline (H) | Wales | 2–1 | Friendly match | Jane Ross, Emma Mitchell | 596 | |
| 1 June 2013 | Laugardalsvöllur, Reykjavík (A) | Iceland | 3–2 | Friendly match | Leanne Crichton, Emily Thomson, Leanne Ross | | |
| 15 June 2013 | Stadion Essen, Essen (A) | Germany | 0–3 | Friendly match | | 9,237 | |
| 21 August 2013 | FA of Serbia Sports Centre, Stara Pazova (A) | Serbia | 1–1 | Friendly match | Lana Clelland | 200 | |
| 22 September 2013 | Tórsvøllur, Tórshavn (A) | Faroe Islands | 7–2 | 2015 World Cup qualifying | Rachel Corsie, Lisa Evans, Leanne Ross (2), Jane Ross, Suzanne Lappin, Suzanne Mulvey | | |
| 26 September 2013 | Fir Park, Motherwell (H) | Bosnia and Herzegovina | 7–0 | 2015 World Cup qualifying | Lisa Evans, Leanne Ross, Kim Little, Rachel Corsie, Jane Ross, Jen Beattie, Suzanne Lappin | 1,061 | |
| 26 October 2013 | Fir Park, Motherwell (H) | Northern Ireland | 2–0 | 2015 World Cup qualifying | Jane Ross, Jen Beattie | 1,582 | |
| 31 October 2013 | Dyskobolia Stadium, Grodzisk Wielkopolski (A) | Poland | 4–0 | 2015 World Cup qualifying | Jane Ross (3), Joanne Love | | |
| 12 December 2013 | Estádio Nacional Mané Garrincha, Brasília (N) | Canada | 0–2 | 2013 Brazil Women's International Tournament | | | |
| 15 December 2013 | Estádio Nacional Mané Garrincha, Brasília (A) | Brazil | 1–3 | 2013 Brazil Women's International Tournament | Hayley Lauder | | |
| 18 December 2013 | Estádio Nacional Mané Garrincha, Brasília (N) | Chile | 3–4 | 2013 Brazil Women's International Tournament | Jane Ross, Christie Murray, Sarah Crilly | | |
| 22 December 2013 | Estádio Nacional Mané Garrincha, Brasília (N) | Canada | 0–1 | 2013 Brazil Women's International Tournament | | | |
| 13 February 2014 | Eerikkilän Urheiluopisto (A) | Finland | 1–3 | Friendly match | Kim Little | | |
| 5 March 2014 | GSZ Stadium, Larnaca (N) | France | 1–1 | 2014 Cyprus Cup | Leanne Ross | | |
| 7 March 2014 | GSP Stadium, Nicosia (N) | Netherlands | 4–3 | 2014 Cyprus Cup | Lisa Evans (3), Jen Beattie | | |
| 10 March 2014 | GSZ Stadium, Larnaca (N) | Australia | 4–2 | 2014 Cyprus Cup | Lisa Evans, Jane Ross (3) | | |
| 12 March 2014 | GSZ Stadium, Larnaca (N) | South Korea | 1–1 | 2014 Cyprus Cup | Kim Little | | |
| 5 April 2014 | Fir Park, Motherwell (H) | Poland | 2–0 | 2015 World Cup qualifying | Lisa Evans, Leanne Crichton | 1,551 | |
| 10 April 2014 | Bilino Polje, Zenica (A) | Bosnia and Herzegovina | 3–1 | 2015 World Cup qualifying | Jane Ross (3) | | |
| 14 June 2014 | Fir Park, Motherwell (H) | Sweden | 1–3 | 2015 World Cup qualifying | Kim Little | | |
| 19 June 2014 | Solitude, Belfast (A) | Northern Ireland | 2–0 | 2015 World Cup qualifying | Kim Little, Jane Ross | | |
| 3 August 2014 | Palmerston Park, Dumfries (H) | Wales | 1–1 | Friendly match | Rachel Corsie | | |
| 20 August 2014 | Estádio Dr. José de Matos, Viana do Castelo (A) | Portugal | 1–1 | Friendly match | Rachel Corsie | | |
| 13 September 2014 | Fir Park, Motherwell (H) | Faroe Islands | 9–0 | 2015 World Cup qualifying | Kim Little, Caroline Weir, Jane Ross (3), Rachel Corsie (2), Leanne Crichton, Jen Beattie | | |
| 17 September 2014 | Gamla Ullevi, Gothenburg (A) | Sweden | 0–2 | 2015 World Cup qualifying | | | |
| 25 October 2014 | Tynecastle Stadium, Edinburgh (H) | Netherlands | 1–2 | 2015 World Cup qualifying | Kim Little | | |
| 30 October 2014 | Sparta Stadion, Rotterdam (A) | Netherlands | 0–2 | 2015 World Cup qualifying | | | |
| 8 February 2015 | Solitude, Belfast (A) | Northern Ireland | 4–0 | Friendly match | Jane Ross (2), Caroline Weir (2) | | |
| 4 March 2015 | GSP Stadium, Nicosia (N) | Canada | 0–2 | 2015 Cyprus Cup | | | |
| 6 March 2015 | GSZ Stadium, Larnaca (N) | Italy | 2–3 | 2015 Cyprus Cup | Emma Mitchell, Kim Little | | |
| 9 March 2015 | GSZ Stadium, Larnaca (N) | South Korea | 2–1 | 2015 Cyprus Cup | Kim Little, Christie Murray | | |
| 11 March 2015 | Ammochostos Stadium, Larnaca (N) | Netherlands | 3–1 | 2015 Cyprus Cup | Kim Little (3) | | |
| 9 April 2015 | Falkirk Stadium, Falkirk (H) | Australia | 1–1 | Friendly match | Jane Ross | | |
| 28 May 2015 | Stade Marcel Picot, Nancy (A) | France | 0–1 | Friendly match | | | |
| 17 September 2015 | Firhill Stadium, Glasgow (H) | Norway | 0–4 | Friendly match | | | |
| 22 September 2015 | Ajdovščina Stadium, Ajdovščina (A) | Slovenia | 3–0 | Euro 2017 qualifying | Kim Little (3) | 794 | |
| 23 October 2015 | Fir Park, Motherwell (H) | Belarus | 7–0 | Euro 2017 qualifying | Jane Ross (2), Caroline Weir, Rachel Corsie, Lisa Evans, Joanne Love (2) | 1,367 | |
| 27 October 2015 | FFM Training Centre, Skopje (A) | Macedonia | 4–1 | Euro 2017 qualifying | Kim Little, Rachel Corsie (2), Caroline Weir | | |
| 29 November 2015 | St Mirren Park, Paisley (H) | Macedonia | 10–0 | Euro 2017 qualifying | Jane Ross (4), Joanne Love (3), Jen Beattie, Hayley Lauder, Lisa Evans | | |
| 26 January 2016 | Prioritet Serneke Arena, Gothenburg (A) | Sweden | 0–6 | Friendly match | | | |
| 8 March 2016 | Falkirk Stadium, Falkirk (H) | Spain | 1–1 | Friendly match | Emma Mitchell | | |
| 8 April 2016 | St Mirren Park, Paisley (H) | Slovenia | 3–1 | Euro 2017 qualifying | Jane Ross (2), Kim Little | | |
| 3 June 2016 | Falkirk Stadium, Falkirk (H) | Iceland | 0–4 | Euro 2017 qualifying | | 2,690 | |
| 7 June 2016 | FC Minsk Stadium, Minsk (A) | Belarus | 1–0 | Euro 2017 qualifying | Joanne Love | | |
| 20 September 2016 | Laugardalsvöllur, Reykjavík (A) | Iceland | 2–1 | Euro 2017 qualifying | Jane Ross (2) | 6,468 | |
| 20 October 2016 | Almondvale Stadium, Livingston (H) | Netherlands | 0–7 | Friendly match | | 1,326 | |
| 20 January 2017 | GSZ Stadium, Larnaca, Cyprus (N) | Denmark | 2–2 | Friendly match | Jane Ross, Erin Cuthbert | | |
| 23 January 2017 | Paralimni Stadium, Paralimni, Cyprus (N) | Denmark | 1–1 | Friendly match | Kim Little | | |
| 1 March 2017 | Ammochostos Stadium, Larnaca (N) | New Zealand | 3–2 | 2017 Cyprus Cup | Jane Ross, Erin Cuthbert, Kim Little | | |
| 3 March 2017 | GSP Stadium, Nicosia (N) | South Korea | 0–2 | 2017 Cyprus Cup | | | |
| 6 March 2017 | GSZ Stadium, Larnaca (N) | Austria | 3–1 | 2017 Cyprus Cup | Jane Ross, Leanne Ross, Lisa Evans | | |
| 8 March 2017 | Paralimni Stadium, Paralimni (N) | Wales | 0–0 | 2017 Cyprus Cup | | | |
| 11 April 2017 | Den Dreef, Leuven (A) | Belgium | 0–5 | Friendly match | | | |
| 9 June 2017 | Falkirk Stadium, Falkirk (H) | Romania | 2–0 | Friendly match | Lisa Evans, Jane Ross | | |
| 13 June 2017 | Myresjöhus Arena, Växjö (A) | Sweden | 0–1 | Friendly match | | | |
| 7 July 2017 | Stark's Park, Kirkcaldy (H) | Republic of Ireland | 1–0 | Friendly match | Christie Murray | | |
| 19 July 2017 | Stadion Galgenwaard, Utrecht (N) | England | 0–6 | Euro 2017 Group D | | 5,578 | |
| 23 July 2017 | Het Kasteel, Rotterdam (N) | Portugal | 1–2 | Euro 2017 Group D | Erin Cuthbert | 3,123 | |
| 27 July 2017 | De Adelaarshorst, Deventer (N) | Spain | 1–0 | Euro 2017 Group D | Caroline Weir | 4,840 | |
| 14 September 2017 | Telki Training Centre, Telki (A) | Hungary | 3–0 | Friendly match | Lana Clelland, Claire Emslie, Jane Ross | | |
| 19 October 2017 | FC Minsk Stadium, Minsk (A) | Belarus | 2–1 | 2019 World Cup qualifying | Jane Ross, Own goal | | |
| 24 October 2017 | St Mirren Park, Paisley (H) | Albania | 5–0 | 2019 World Cup qualifying | Own goal, Fiona Brown, Jane Ross, Claire Emslie, Lisa Evans | | |
| 19 January 2018 | La Manga Stadium, La Manga (N) | Norway | 0–3 | Friendly match | | | |
| 22 January 2018 | Pinatar Football Arena, Murcia (N) | Russia | 0–0 | Friendly match | | | |
| 3 March 2018 | La Manga Stadium, La Manga (N) | New Zealand | 2–0 | Friendly match | Jane Ross, Lisa Evans | | |
| 6 March 2018 | La Manga Stadium, La Manga (N) | New Zealand | 2–0 | Friendly match | Jane Ross, Fiona Brown | | |
| 5 April 2018 | LIPO Park, Schaffhausen (A) | Switzerland | 0–1 | 2019 World Cup qualifying | | | |
| 10 April 2018 | St Mirren Park, Paisley (H) | Poland | 3–0 | 2019 World Cup qualifying | Zoe Ness, Claire Emslie, Erin Cuthbert | 2,121 | |
| 7 June 2018 | Falkirk Stadium, Falkirk (H) | Belarus | 2–1 | 2019 World Cup qualifying | Erin Cuthbert (2) | 2,007 | |
| 12 June 2018 | Kielce City Stadium, Kielce (A) | Poland | 3–2 | 2019 World Cup qualifying | Kim Little, Jane Ross, Lisa Evans | 4,410 | |
| 30 August 2018 | St Mirren Park, Paisley (H) | Switzerland | 2–1 | 2019 World Cup qualifying | Erin Cuthbert, Kim Little | 4,098 | |
| 4 September 2018 | Loro Boriçi Stadium, Shkodër (A) | Albania | 2–1 | 2019 World Cup qualifying | Kim Little, Jane Ross | | |
| 13 November 2018 | St Mirren Park, Paisley (H) | United States | 0–1 | Friendly match | | 3,790 | |
| 17 January 2019 | La Manga Stadium, La Manga (N) | Norway | 1–3 | Friendly match | Caroline Weir | | |
| 21 January 2019 | La Manga Stadium, La Manga (N) | Iceland | 1–2 | Friendly match | Lana Clelland | | |
| 1 March 2019 | Estadio Municipal de Lagos, Lagos (N) | Canada | 0–1 | 2019 Algarve Cup | | | |
| 4 March 2019 | Estadio Municipal da Bela Vista, Parchal (N) | Iceland | 4–1 | 2019 Algarve Cup | Lizzie Arnot (2), Erin Cuthbert, Kim Little | | |
| 6 March 2019 | Estádio Algarve, São João da Venda (N) | Denmark | 1–0 | 2019 Algarve Cup | Jane Ross | | |
| 5 April 2019 | Pinatar Arena Football Centre, San Pedro del Pinatar (N) | Chile | 1–1 | Friendly match | Erin Cuthbert | | |
| 8 April 2019 | Pinatar Arena Football Centre, San Pedro del Pinatar (N) | Brazil | 1–0 | Friendly match | Kim Little | | |
| 28 May 2019 | Hampden Park, Glasgow (H) | Jamaica | 3–2 | Friendly match | Erin Cuthbert, Caroline Weir, Sophie Howard | 18,555 | |
| 9 June 2019 | Stade de Nice, Nice (N) | England | 1–2 | 2019 World Cup group | Claire Emslie | 13,188 | |
| 14 June 2019 | Roazhon Park, Rennes (N) | Japan | 1–2 | 2019 World Cup group | Lana Clelland | 13,201 | |
| 19 June 2019 | Parc des Princes, Paris (N) | Argentina | 3–3 | 2019 World Cup group | Kim Little, Jen Beattie, Erin Cuthbert | 28,205 | |
| 30 August 2019 | Easter Road, Edinburgh (H) | Cyprus | 8–0 | Euro 2021 qualifying | Claire Emslie, Kim Little (5), Jane Ross, Caroline Weir | 6,206 | |
| 8 November 2019 | Elbasan Arena, Elbasan (A) | Albania | 5–0 | Euro 2021 qualifying | Claire Emslie, Jane Ross, Erin Cuthbert, Hannah Godfrey, Christie Murray | | |

== See also ==
- Scotland at the FIFA Women's World Cup
- Scotland women's national football team 1972–99 results
- Scotland women's national football team 2000–09 results
- Scotland women's national football team 2020–29 results
