= Scotland women's national football team results (1972–1999) =

Scotland women's national football team results
- 1972–99
- 2000–09
- 2010–19
- 2020–present

This article lists the results of the Scotland women's national football team from their first official match in 1972 to 1999. The list excludes unofficial matches, where the opposition did not have full international status or it was played behind closed doors.

== 1970s ==
=== 1972 ===
18 Nov 1972	Scotland	2–3	England	Ravenscraig Stadium, Greenock
		Report

=== 1973 ===
23 Jun 1973	England	8–0	Scotland	Nuneaton
		Report

=== 1974 ===
21 Sep 1974	Italy	4–3	Scotland	Ravenna

24 Sep 1974	Italy	3–0	Scotland	Milan

23 Nov 1974	Scotland	11–1	Northern Ireland	Kilbowie Park, Clydebank

=== 1975 ===
26 Apr 1975	Scotland	3–2	Wales	Douglas Park, Hamilton, South Lanarkshire

=== 1976 ===
18 Apr 1976	Republic of Ireland	3–3	Scotland	Dublin

21 May 1976 Three Nations	Wales	2-3	Scotland	St Albans

23 May 1976 Three Nations	England	5–1	Scotland	Enfield
		Report

4 July 1976	Scotland	3–1	Republic of Ireland	Grangemouth
	Creamer 15'; McLaren 50'; Hunter 75'		Begbie (o.g.), 30'	Attendance: 200

26 Sep 1976	Wales	2–2	Scotland	Prestatyn

=== 1977 ===
26 Feb 1977	Northern Ireland	1–3	Scotland	Larne

29 May 1977	Scotland	2–1	England	Downfield Park, Dundee
		Report

=== 1978 ===
8 Apr 1978	Scotland	2–1	Northern Ireland	Glenrothes

29 Jul 1978	Scotland	0–0	Switzerland	Pescara

31 Jul 1978	Scotland	3–2	Yugoslavia	Pescara

5 Aug 1978	Italy	4–1	Scotland	Pescara

=== 1979 ===
22 Apr 1979	Scotland	2-0	Wales	Dundee

2 Jun 1979	Northern Ireland	0-3	Scotland	Ballyclare

20 Jul 1979 1979 Unofficial Euros	France	0–0	Scotland	Rimini

22 Jul 1979 1979 Unofficial Euros	Denmark	2–0	Scotland	Riccione

== 1980s ==
=== 1980 ===
27 Apr 1980	Wales	0–1	Scotland	Cardiff

=== 1981 ===
29 Mar 1981	Republic of Ireland	0–5	Scotland	Dublin

26 Apr 1981	Scotland	0–0	Wales	Hamilton

22 Aug 1981	Italy	3–0	Scotland	Alghero

25 Aug 1981	Belgium	0–1	Scotland	Sennori

20 Sep 1981	Scotland	3–2	Iceland	Dumbarton

=== 1982 ===
19 Aug 1982	Italy	1–2	Scotland	Monfalcone

22 Aug 1982	Italy	4–1	Scotland	Grado

4 Sep 1982 Unofficial 1984 Euro qualifiers	Northern Ireland	1–2	Scotland	Belfast

19 Sep 1982 Unofficial 1984 Euro qualifiers	Scotland	3–0	Republic of Ireland	Dunfermline

3 Oct 1982 Unofficial 1984 Euro qualifiers	Scotland	0–4	England	Dumbarton
		Report

=== 1983 ===
18 Mar 1983 Unofficial 1984 Euro qualifiers	Republic of Ireland	1–1	Scotland	Dublin

17 Apr 1983 Unofficial 1984 Euro qualifiers	Scotland	3–0	Northern Ireland	Glasgow

22 May 1983 Unofficial 1984 Euro qualifiers	England	2–0	Scotland	Leeds
		Report

=== 1984 ===
22 Apr 1984	Wales	1–1	Scotland	Colwyn Bay

27 May 1984	Scotland	0–1	Republic of Ireland	Glasgow

=== 1985 ===
17 Mar 1985 Unofficial 1987 Euro qualifiers	England	4–0	Scotland	Preston
		Report

2 Jun 1985 Unofficial 1987 Euro qualifiers	Scotland	2–1	Republic of Ireland	Glasgow

23 Nov 1985 Unofficial 1987 Euro qualifiers	Northern Ireland	1–9	Scotland	Belfast

=== 1986 ===
3 May 1986	Scotland	0–1	Denmark	Edinburgh

25 May 1986 Unofficial 1987 Euro qualifiers	Scotland	7–0	Northern Ireland	Dumbarton

28 Sep 1986 Unofficial 1987 Euro qualifiers	Republic of Ireland	1–5	Scotland	Dublin

12 Oct 1986 Unofficial 1987 Euro qualifiers	Scotland	1–3	England	Stark's Park, Kirkcaldy
		Report

=== 1987 ===
7 Nov 1987 Unofficial 1989 Euro qualifiers	Netherlands	4–0	Scotland	Nuth

=== 1988 ===
3 Apr 1988 Unofficial 1989 Euro qualifiers	Republic of Ireland	2–1	Scotland	Dublin

=== 1989 ===
30 Apr 1989	Scotland	0–3	England	Stark's Park, Kirkcaldy
		Report

== 1990s ==
=== 1990 ===
21 Apr 1990	Scotland	4–1	Northern Ireland	Stranraer

6 May 1990	Scotland	0–4	England	Love Street, Paisley
		Report

12 May 1990	England	4–0	Scotland	Wembley Stadium, London
		Report

=== 1991 ===
20 Apr 1991	England	5–0	Scotland	High Wycombe
		Report

=== 1992 ===
31 Mar 1992 Varna Tournament	Scotland	0–1	North Korea	Varna

3 Apr 1992 Varna Tournament	Scotland	3–0	Bulgaria	Varna

18 Apr 1992 UEFA Euro 1993 qualifier	England	1–0	Scotland	Walsall
		Report

20 May 1992 UEFA Euro 1993 qualifier	Scotland	0–0	Iceland	McDiarmid Park, Perth

22 Jun 1992 UEFA Euro 1993 qualifier	Iceland	2–1	Scotland	Akranesvöllur, Akranes

23 Aug 1992 UEFA Euro 1993 qualifier	Scotland	0–2	England	McDiarmid Park, Perth
		Report

=== 1993 ===
16 Oct 1993 UEFA Euro 1995 qualifier	Italy	4–0	Scotland	Senigallia

=== 1994 ===
20 Feb 1994 UEFA Euro 1995 qualifier	France	1–0	Scotland	Ozoir-la-Ferriere

3 Apr 1994 UEFA Euro 1995 qualifier	Scotland	0–4	Italy	Forthbank Stadium, Stirling

24 Apr 1994 UEFA Euro 1995 qualifier	Scotland	1–2	Portugal	Forthbank Stadium, Stirling

9 May 1994	Scotland	1–4	Iceland	Tinto Park, Glasgow

25 May 1994 UEFA Euro 1995 qualifier	Portugal	8–2	Scotland	Almeirim

21 Sep 1994 UEFA Euro 1995 qualifier	Scotland	0–3	France	Allan Park, Aberdeen

=== 1995 ===
17 May 1995	Scotland	0–0	Australia	Rugby Park, Kilmarnock

23 Oct 1995 UEFA Euro 1997 qualifier	Scotland	7–1	Faroe Islands	Forthbank Stadium, Stirling

5 Nov 1995 UEFA Euro 1997 qualifier	Republic of Ireland	2–0	Scotland	Dublin

26 Nov 1995 UEFA Euro 1997 qualifier	Scotland	0–3	Belgium	Love Street, Paisley

=== 1996 ===
24 Mar 1996 UEFA Euro 1997 qualifier	Wales	5–1	Scotland	Caersws

7 Apr 1996 UEFA Euro 1997 qualifier	Scotland	2–4	Republic of Ireland	Forthbank Stadium, Stirling

20 Apr 1996 UEFA Euro 1997 qualifier	Belgium	6–1	Scotland	Namur

25 May 1996 UEFA Euro 1997 qualifier	Faroe Islands	0–3	Scotland	Svangaskarð
		Report

2 Jun 1996 UEFA Euro 1997 qualifier	Scotland	3–2	Wales	Allan Park, Aberdeen
		Report

17 Nov 1996	Scotland	0–2	Wales	Somerset Park, Ayr

10 Dec 1996	Brazil	5–0	Scotland	São Paulo

12 Dec 1996	Brazil	6–0	Scotland	São Paulo

14 Dec 1996	Brazil	7–1	Scotland	São Paulo

=== 1997 ===
9 Mar 1997	England	6–0	Scotland	Bramall Lane, Sheffield
		Report

23 Aug 1997	Scotland	0–4	England	Almondvale Stadium, Livingston
		Report

3 Sep 1997 1999 World Cup qualifier	Estonia	1–7	Scotland	Tallinn

7 Sep 1997 1999 World Cup qualifier	Lithuania	0–5	Scotland	Vilnius

=== 1998 ===
26 Apr 1998 1999 World Cup qualifier	Czech Republic	1–1	Scotland	Český Dub

3 May 1998 1999 World Cup qualifier	Scotland	7–0	Estonia	Somerset Park, Ayr

23 May 1998 1999 World Cup qualifier	Scotland	1–1	Czech Republic	Caledonian Stadium, Inverness

30 May 1998 1999 World Cup qualifier	Scotland	17–0	Lithuania	Scotstoun Stadium, Glasgow
		Report

13 Sep 1998	Scotland	0–3	Spain	Forthbank Stadium, Stirling

11 Oct 1998	Spain	4–1	Scotland	Cordoba

16 Dec 1998	Netherlands	1–0	Scotland	Zeist

=== 1999 ===
13 Apr 1999 Albena Cup	Scotland	3–3	Romania	Varna

14 Apr 1999 Albena Cup	Scotland	5–0	Moldova	Varna

15 Apr 1999 Albena Cup	Russia	0–0	Scotland	Varna

17 Apr 1999 Albena Cup	North Korea	1–1	Scotland	Varna

18 Apr 1999 Albena Cup	Russia	3–0	Scotland	Varna

9 May 1999	Scotland	3–4	France	Excelsior Stadium, Airdrie

14 Aug 1999	Finland	2–0	Scotland	Kauniainen

3 Oct 1999 UEFA Euro 2001 qualifier	Scotland	3–0	Republic of Ireland	Broadwood Stadium, Cumbernauld

23 Oct 1999 UEFA Euro 2001 qualifier	Croatia	4–3	Scotland	Poreč

14 Nov 1999 UEFA Euro 2001 qualifier	Scotland	2–1	Czech Republic	Broadwood Stadium, Cumbernauld

== See also ==
- Scotland women's national football team 2000–09 results
- Scotland women's national football team 2010–19 results
- Scotland women's national football team 2020–29 results
