= 2011 FIFA Women's World Cup qualification – UEFA Group 3 =

Football tournament qualification stage

The 2011 FIFA Women's World Cup qualification UEFA Group 3 was a UEFA qualifying group for the 2011 FIFA Women's World Cup. The group comprised Denmark, Scotland, Greece, Bulgaria and Georgia.

Denmark won the group and advanced to the play-off rounds.

== Standings ==
Team	Pld	W	D	L	GF	GA	GD	Pts	Denmark	Scotland	Greece	Bulgaria	Georgia
Denmark	8	6	2	0	45	0	+45	20	—	0–0	7–0	9–0	15–0
Scotland	8	6	1	1	24	5	+19	19	0–1	—	4–1	8–1	3–1
Greece	8	3	0	5	11	20	−9	9	0–6	0–1	—	1–2	5–0
Bulgaria	8	2	2	4	9	25	−16	8	0–0	0–5	0–1	—	5–0
Georgia	8	0	1	7	3	42	−39	1	0–7	1–3	0–3	1–1	—

- Denmark win Group 3 and advance to the UEFA play-off rounds.

== Results ==
23 September 2009
16:30 UTC+3

Greece	0–6	Denmark
	Report	Paaske-Sørensen 12', 71'; Veje 17'; Pape 23'; Sand Andersen 25'; Rydahl Bukh 59'

Yiannis Pathiakakis Stadium, Ano Liossia
Referee: Gordana Kuzmanović (Serbia)

21 October 2009
15:30 UTC+3

Bulgaria	0–1	Greece
	Report	Panteleiadou 53'

Gradski Lovech Stadium, Lovech
Referee: Caroline De Boeck (Belgium)

24 October 2009
14:45 UTC+2

Denmark	15–0	Georgia
Sand Andersen 13', 56'; J. Rasmussen 17', 52'; Harder 21', 44', 74'; Munk 28', 32', 48'; Veje 38'; Brogaard 53', 81' (pen.); Troelsgaard Nielsen 84', 90+2'	Report

Vejle Stadion, Vejle
Referee: Katalin Kulcsar (Hungary)
24 October 2009
16:00 UTC+3

Greece	0–1	Scotland
	Report	Beattie 53'

Yiannis Pathiakakis Stadium, Ano Liossia
Referee: Tanja Schett (Austria)

28 October 2009
15:30 UTC+2

Bulgaria	0–0	Denmark
	Report

Gradski Lovech Stadium, Lovech
Referee: Olga Tanschi (Moldova)

29 October 2009
19:30 UTC±0

Scotland	3–1	Georgia
Grant 50', 80'; Little 51'	Report	Pogosian 59'

Tynecastle Stadium, Edinburgh
Referee: Dilan Gökçek (Turkey)

21 November 2009
14:00 UTC+2

Bulgaria	5–0	Georgia
Nadirashvili 28' (o.g.); Pasikashvili 31' (o.g.); Kostova 51'; Boyanova 65'; Gospodinova 90+1'	Report

Gradski Lovech Stadium, Lovech
Referee: Elia María Martínez Martínez (Spain)

26 November 2009
15:00 UTC+2

Greece	5–0	Georgia
Katsaiti 31' (pen.); Kontomichi 42', 67', 70'; Papadopoulou 53'	Report

Michalis Kritikopoulos Stadium, Athens
Referee: Hilda McDermott (Republic of Ireland)

27 March 2010
15:00 UTC+4

Georgia	1–3	Scotland
Chichinadze 21'	Report	Beattie 45+4'; Corsie 52'; Ross 82'

Mikheil Meskhi Stadium, Tbilisi
Referee: Monica Larsen (Norway)
27 March 2010
14:45 UTC+1

Denmark	9–0	Bulgaria
J. Rasmussen 6', 21'; K. Pedersen 10'; Munk 37'; Troelsgaard Nielsen 45'; Paaske-Sørensen 53' (pen.), 78'; J. Jensen 55'; Pedersen 90'	Report

Vejle Stadion, Vejle
Referee: Sjoukje De Jong (Netherlands)

1 April 2010
15:00 UTC+4

Georgia	0–7	Denmark
	Report	J. Rasmussen 11', 33', 39', 52'; Paaske-Sørensen 31', 87'; Røddik Hansen 90' (pen.)

Mikheil Meskhi Stadium, Tbilisi
Referee: Tanja Subotic (Slovenia)
1 April 2010
19:30 UTC+1

Scotland	8–1	Bulgaria
Little 39', 87'; Hamill 40'; Fleeting 53', 58', 64', 90'; Grant 60'	Report	Liliana Kostova 21'

Falkirk Stadium, Falkirk
Referee: Marija Margareta Damjanović (Croatia)

15 April 2010
15:00 UTC+4

Georgia	0–3	Greece
	Report	Gkatzogianni 23'; Chalkiadaki 28'; Sidira 60'

Mikheil Meskhi Stadium, Tbilisi
Referee: Leen Martens (Belgium)

19 June 2010
14:30 UTC+2

Denmark	7–0	Greece
Røddik Hansen 7'; J. Rasmussen 45+1', 80'; Pape 49' (pen.); Kakambouki 50' (o.g.); Paaske-Sørensen 77'; Gajhede 79'	Report

Vejle Stadion, Vejle
Referee: Teodora Albon (Romania)
19 June 2010
18:00 UTC+3

Bulgaria	0–5	Scotland
	Report	Beattie 17'; Fleeting 35'; Little 62' (pen.); Corsie 66'; Hamill 90+2'

Georgi Asparuhov Stadium, Sofia
Referee: Christina Westrum Pedersen (Norway)

24 June 2010
19:30 UTC+1

Scotland	0–1	Denmark
	Report	Røddik Hansen 22'

Rugby Park, Kilmarnock
Referee: Kirsi Heikkinen (Finland)

21 August 2010
17:00 UTC+4

Georgia	1–1	Bulgaria
Matveeva 24'	Report	Koshuleva 50'

Mikheil Meskhi Stadium, Tbilisi
Referee: Anja Kunick (Germany)
21 August 2010
14:00 UTC+1

Scotland	4–1	Greece
Beattie 22'; Fleeting 24'; Corsie 81'; Grant 83'	Report	Sidira 6' (pen.)

Strathclyde Homes Stadium, Dumbarton
Referee: Gyöngyi Krisztina Gaál (Hungary)

25 August 2010
17:30 UTC+3

Greece	1–2	Bulgaria
Kakambouki 5'	Report	Radoyska 69'; Kostova 80' (pen.)

Municipal Stadium Arta, Arta
Referee: Mihaela Gurdon Bašimamović (Croatia)
25 August 2010
18:15 UTC+2

Denmark	0–0	Scotland
	Report

Vejle Stadion, Vejle
Referee: Dagmar Damková (Czech Republic)

== Goalscorers ==
10 goals

- (Denmark) Johanna Rasmussen

7 goals

- (Denmark) Cathrine Paaske-Sørensen

6 goals

- (Scotland) Julie Fleeting

4 goals

- (Denmark) Lise Overgaard Munk
- (Scotland) Jen Beattie
- (Scotland) Kim Little
- (Scotland) Suzanne Grant

3 goals

- (Denmark) Camilla Sand Andersen
- (Denmark) Line Røddik Hansen
- (Denmark) Maiken Pape
- (Denmark) Pernille Harder
- (Denmark) Sanne Troelsgaard Nielsen
- (Greece) Kalomoira Kontomichi
- (Scotland) Rachel Corsie

2 goals

- (Denmark) Katrine Veje
- (Denmark) Mia Brogaard
- (Greece) Danai-Eleni Sidira
- (Scotland) Pauline Hamill

1 goal

- (Bulgaria) Andriana Boyanova
- (Bulgaria) Liliana Kostova
- (Bulgaria) Valentina Gospodinova
- (Bulgaria) Velina Koshuleva
- (Denmark) Janni Arnth Jensen
- (Denmark) Julie Rydahl Bukh
- (Denmark) Katrine Pedersen
- (Denmark) Kristine Pedersen
- (Georgia (country)) Ana Pogosian
- (Georgia (country)) Lela Chichinadze
- (Georgia (country)) Tatiana Matveeva
- (Greece) Anastasia Papadopoulou
- (Greece) Dimitra Panteleiadou
- (Greece) Glykeria Gkatzogianni
- (Greece) Konstantina Katsaiti
- (Greece) Panagiota Chalkiadaki
- (Scotland) Leanne Ross
- (Scotland) Liliana Kostova
- (Denmark) Mariann Gajhede

own goals

- (Greece) Eleni Kakambouki
- (Georgia (country)) Nino Pasikashvili
- (Georgia (country)) Tamar Nadirashvili
