= Karin Stevens =

Dutch footballer

Karin Stevens Stevie Malagrida (since 2015)
Personal information
- Full name: Karin Christiaan Ida Catharina Stevens
- Date of birth: 11 June 1989 (age 37)
- Place of birth: Maastricht, Netherlands
- Positions: Midfielder; striker

Team information
- Current team: DVC Eva's Tienen

Youth career
- Leonidas Wolder
- SC Jekerdal

Senior career*
Years	Team	Apps	(Gls)
2007–2010	Willem II	37	(32)
2011	Lierse		
2015–2016	Ladies Genk	9	(6)
2016–	DVC Eva's Tienen	3	(0)

International career
2006–2009	Netherlands	35	(16)
- * Club domestic league appearances and goals as of 1 July 2017

Karin Christiaan Ida Catharina Stevens (born 11 June 1989) and known since 2015 as Stevie Malagrida, is a Dutch football striker, who plays for DVC Eva's Tienen in the women's Belgian First Division (second tier). She has also played for the Dutch national team.

== Club career ==
Her career started at amateur clubs Leonidas Wolder and later SC Jekerdal where she played amongst the boys teams. She began as an offensive midfielder able to play in any position in the front. When the Dutch women's professional league (Eredivisie Vrouwen) was established in 2007, she signed to play for FC Twente, however she was prevented from playing for the club due to regulations restricting the number of national team players per club, in order to play she moved to Willem II.

In her first season (2007–08) at Willem II, she scored 20 goals in 22 matches and was the club and league top scorer. In her second season (2008–09) she managed 10 goals in 12 matches as a shoulder injury sidelined her for five months of the season. She received offers to play for clubs abroad, Brøndby IF (Denmark) and LdB FC Malmö (Sweden) showed interest, but planning for a career after football she decided to decline the offers from abroad. The shoulder injury required a second operation and she missed almost the entire 2009–10, playing just 2 matches and scoring 1 goal.

She was making her comeback during the 2010–11 season and played 4 matches scoring 1 goal, when on 4 January 2011, she joined Lierse in the Belgian First Division. At the end of the season, on 4 August 2011, she decided to retire from football.

In May 2015, she agreed a contract with Ladies Genk and in August 2015 she made a comeback under a new name Stevie Malagrida. She played 9 matches of the 2015–16 Belgian Super League season for Ladies Genk.

She moved from Genk to DVC Eva's Tienen ahead of the 2016–17 Super League season. She played 3 matches for Tienen that season.

== International career ==
She made her debut for the Netherlands women's national football team under coach Vera Pauw on 31 August 2006, in a 4–0 World Cup qualifying defeat to England.

She played an important part in qualifying the Netherlands to the UEFA Women's Euro 2009 for the first time by scoring three of the Dutch four goals in the two legs 2009 Euro qualifying play-offs against Spain. She was selected for the Dutch team which reached the semifinals of the UEFA Women's Euro 2009, playing all of the Netherlands five matches in the tournament and scoring the second goal of the country debut match in major tournaments, against Ukraine. The semifinal match England was her 35th and last match for the national team, she scored 16 goals.

=== International goals ===
Scores and results list the Netherlands goal tally first.

Goal	Date	Venue	Opponent	Score	Result	Competition
1.	24 September 2006	Oosterenkstadion, Zwolle, Netherlands	Hungary	1–0	4–0	2007 FIFA Women's World Cup qualification
2.	24 September 2006	Oosterenkstadion, Zwolle, Netherlands	Hungary	2–0	4–0	2007 FIFA Women's World Cup qualification
3.	24 September 2006	Oosterenkstadion, Zwolle, Netherlands	Hungary	4–0	4–0	2007 FIFA Women's World Cup qualification
4.	22 November 2006	Mitsubishi Forklift Stadion, Almere, Netherlands	Russia	1–0	5–0	Friendly
5.	6 March 2008	Alpha Sports Center, Larnaca, Cyprus	Japan	1–1	1–3	2008 Cyprus Cup
6.	8 March 2008	Paralimni Stadium, Paralimni, Cyprus	Scotland	1–0	1–0	2008 Cyprus Cup
7.	7 May 2008	Univé Stadion, Emmen, Netherlands	China	1–0	1–1	Friendly
8.	10 August 2008	Caledonian Stadium, Pretoria, South Africa	South Africa	2–1	2–1	Friendly
9.	27 September 2008	Kras Stadion, Volendam, Netherlands	Belgium	3–0	3–0	2009 UEFA Women's Euro qualification
10.	25 October 2008	Pabellón de la Ciudad del Fútbol, Madrid, Spain	Spain	1–0	2–0	2009 UEFA Women's Euro qualification
11.	30 October 2008	Kras Stadion, Volendam, Netherlands	Spain	1–0	2–0	2009 UEFA Women's Euro qualification
12.	30 October 2008	Kras Stadion, Volendam, Netherlands	Spain	2–0	2–0	2009 UEFA Women's Euro qualification
13.	14 December 2008	Stade Paul Cosyns, Compiègne, France	France	1–0	2–0	Friendly
14.	11 July 2009	Olympic Stadium, Amsterdam, Netherlands	Switzerland	1–0	5–0	Four Nations Cup
15.	15 July 2009	Olympic Stadium, Amsterdam, Netherlands	China	1–1	2–4	Four Nations Cup
16.	23 August 2009	Veritas Stadion, Turku, Finland	Ukraine	2–0	2–0	UEFA Women's Euro 2009
