= Scotland women's national football team results (2020–present) =

This article lists the results and fixtures for the Scotland women's national football team from 2020 to 2029.

== Key ==
Key to matches

- Att. = Match attendance
- (H) = Home ground
- (A) = Away ground
- (N) = Neutral ground

== Results and scheduled fixtures ==
Scotland's score is shown first in each case.

Date	Venue	Opponents	Score	Competition	Scotland scorers	Att.	Ref.
4 March 2020	Pinatar Arena, San Pedro del Pinatar (N)	Ukraine	3–0	2020 Pinatar Cup	Martha Thomas (2), Claire Emslie		
7 March 2020	Pinatar Arena, San Pedro del Pinatar (N)	Iceland	1–0	2020 Pinatar Cup	Abbi Grant		
10 March 2020	Pinatar Arena, San Pedro del Pinatar (N)	Northern Ireland	2–1	2020 Pinatar Cup	Erin Cuthbert, Abbi Grant	300	
23 October 2020	Tynecastle Park, Edinburgh (H)	Albania	3–0	Euro 2021 qualifying	Rachel Corsie, Caroline Weir (2)	None	
27 October 2020	Bolt Arena, Helsinki (A)	Finland	0–1	Euro 2021 qualifying	—		
27 November 2020	Estádio do Restelo, Lisbon (A)	Portugal	0–1	Euro 2021 qualifying	—		
1 December 2020	Easter Road, Edinburgh (H)	Finland	0–1	Euro 2021 qualifying	—	None	
19 February 2021	AEK Arena, Larnaca (A)	Cyprus	10–0	Euro 2021 qualifying	Erin Cuthbert (2), Martha Thomas (2), Caroline Weir, Kirsty Hanson, Lizzie Arnot, Claire Emslie, Jane Ross (2)		
23 February 2021	Antonis Papadopoulos Stadium, Larnaca (N)	Portugal	0–2	Euro 2021 qualifying	—		
10 June 2021	Seaview, Belfast (A)	Northern Ireland	1–0	Friendly	Caroline Weir		
15 June 2021	Parc y Scarlets, Llanelli (A)	Wales	1–0	Friendly	Erin Cuthbert		
17 September 2021	Hidegkuti Nándor Stadion, Budapest (A)	Hungary	2–0	2023 World Cup qualifying	Erin Cuthbert, Martha Thomas		
21 September 2021	Hampden Park, Glasgow (H)	Faroe Islands	7–1	2023 World Cup qualifying	Erin Cuthbert, Chloe Arthur (2), Christy Grimshaw, Martha Thomas, Jenna Clark, Claire Emslie		
22 October 2021	Hampden Park, Glasgow (H)	Hungary	2–1	2023 World Cup qualifying	Christy Grimshaw, Rachel Corsie		
26 October 2021	St Mirren Park, Paisley (H)	Sweden	0–2	Friendly	—		
26 November 2021	Hampden Park, Glasgow (H)	Ukraine	1–1	2023 World Cup qualifying	Abi Harrison		
30 November 2021	Estadio de La Cartuja, Seville (A)	Spain	0–8	2023 World Cup qualifying	—		
16 February 2022	Pinatar Arena, San Pedro del Pinatar (N)	Wales	1–3	2022 Pinatar Cup	Lana Clelland		
19 February 2022	Pinatar Arena, San Pedro del Pinatar (N)	Slovakia	2–0	2022 Pinatar Cup	Abi Harrison, Martha Thomas		
22 February 2022	La Manga Club Football Stadium, La Manga (N)	Hungary	0–0	2022 Pinatar Cup	—		
12 April 2022	Hampden Park, Glasgow (H)	Spain	0–2	2023 World Cup qualifying	—		
24 June 2022	Stadion Miejski, Rzeszów (N)	Ukraine	4–0	2023 World Cup qualifying	Caroline Weir, Erin Cuthbert, Martha Thomas (2)		
2 September 2022	MAC³PARK Stadion, Zwolle (A)	Netherlands	1–2	Friendly	Claire Emslie		
6 September 2022	Tórsvøllur, Tórshavn (A)	Faroe Islands	6–0	2023 World Cup qualifying	Nicola Docherty, Caroline Weir, Erin Cuthbert, Martha Thomas, Rachel Corsie, Jen Beattie		
6 October 2022	Hampden Park, Glasgow (H)	Austria	1–0	2023 World Cup playoffs (Note: Scotland won 1–0 after extra time.)	Abi Harrison	10,182	
11 October 2022	Hampden Park, Glasgow (H)	Republic of Ireland	0–1	2023 World Cup playoffs	—	10,708	
14 November 2022	Estadio Antonio Bardillo, Arcos de la Frontera (N)	Venezuela	2–1	Friendly	Kelly Clark, Claire Emslie		
15 February 2023	Pinatar Arena, San Pedro del Pinatar (N)	Iceland	0–2	2023 Pinatar Cup	—		
18 February 2023	Pinatar Arena, San Pedro del Pinatar (N)	Philippines	2–1	2023 Pinatar Cup	Lauren Davidson, Rachel Corsie		
21 February 2023	Pinatar Arena, San Pedro del Pinatar (N)	Wales	1–1	2023 Pinatar Cup	Sophie Howard		
7 April 2023	Plough Lane, London (N)	Australia	1–0	Friendly	Nicola Docherty		
11 April 2023	Hampden Park, Glasgow (H)	Costa Rica	4–0	Friendly	Emma Watson (2), Claire Emslie, Caroline Weir		
14 July 2023	Dens Park, Dundee (H)	Northern Ireland	3–0	Friendly	Erin Cuthbert, Sam Kerr, Martha Thomas		
17 July 2023	Tampere Stadium, Tampere (A)	Finland	2–1	Friendly	Caroline Weir, Emma Watson		
22 September 2023	Stadium of Light, Sunderland (A)	England	1–2	2023–24 Nations League	Kirsty Hanson	41,947	
26 September 2023	Hampden Park, Glasgow (H)	Belgium	1–1	2023–24 Nations League	Sophie Howard	7,058	
27 October 2023	Goffertstadion, Nijmegen (A)	Netherlands	0–4	2023–24 Nations League	—	10,850	
31 October 2023	Hampden Park, Glasgow (H)	Netherlands	0–1	2023–24 Nations League	—	5,186	
1 December 2023	Den Dreef, Leuven (A)	Belgium	1–1	2023–24 Nations League	Erin Cuthbert	4,730	
5 December 2023	Hampden Park, Glasgow (H)	England	0–6	2023–24 Nations League	—	15,320	
24 February 2024	Pinatar Arena, San Pedro del Pinatar (N)	Philippines	2–0	2024 Pinatar Cup	Martha Thomas (2)	200	
27 February 2024	Pinatar Arena, San Pedro del Pinatar (N)	Finland	1–1; 4–5 (p)	2024 Pinatar Cup	Martha Thomas	200	
5 April 2024	Dubočica Stadium, Leskovac (A)	Serbia	0–0	Euro 2025 qualifying	—		
9 April 2024	Hampden Park, Glasgow (H)	Slovakia	1–0	Euro 2025 qualifying	Sophie Howard	3,127	
31 May 2024	Hampden Park, Glasgow (H)	Israel	4–1	Euro 2025 qualifying	Claire Emslie (2), Kirsty Hanson, Martha Thomas	None	
4 June 2024	Budaörsi Városi Stadium, Budaörs (N)	Israel	5–0	Euro 2025 qualifying	Martha Thomas (4), Chelsea Cornet	None	(Note: Due to the Gaza war, Israel were required to play their home matches at a neutral venue.)
12 July 2024	Štadión pod Zoborom, Nitra (A)	Slovakia	2–0	Euro 2025 qualifying	Claire Emslie (2)		
16 July 2024	Firhill Stadium, Glasgow (H)	Serbia	1–0	Euro 2025 qualifying	Kirsty Hanson	3,068	
25 October 2024	Bozsik Aréna, Budapest (A)	Hungary	1–0	Euro 2025 play-offs	Martha Thomas	1,213	
29 October 2024	Easter Road, Edinburgh (H)	Hungary	4–0	Euro 2025 play-offs	Own goal, Erin Cuthbert, Caroline Weir, Martha Thomas	7,176	
29 November 2024	Easter Road, Edinburgh (H)	Finland	0–0	Euro 2025 play-offs	—	8,790	
3 December 2024	Bolt Arena, Helsinki (H)	Finland	0–2	Euro 2025 play-offs	—	7,256	
21 February 2025	Josko Arena, Ried im Innkreis (A)	Austria	0–1	2025 Nations League	—	1,750	
25 February 2025	Hampden Park, Glasgow (H)	Netherlands	1–2	2025 Nations League	Emma Lawton	3,183	
4 April 2025	Tannadice Park, Dundee (H)	Germany	0–4	2025 Nations League	—	6,172	
8 April 2025	Volkswagen Arena, Wolfsburg (A)	Germany	1–6	2025 Nations League	Caroline Weir	16,102	
30 May 2025	Hampden Park, Glasgow (H)	Austria	0–1	2025 Nations League	—		
3 June 2025	Koning Willem II Stadion, Tilburg (A)	Netherlands	1–1	2025 Nations League	Kathleen McGovern		
24 October 2025	Stade Pere Jego, Casablanca (A)	Morocco	2–1	Friendly	Erin Cuthbert, Caroline Weir		
28 October 2025	East End Park, Dunfermline (H)	Switzerland	3–4	Friendly	Kathleen McGovern, Own goal, Caroline Weir		
28 November 2025	Estadio Municipal de Chapín, Jerez (N)	Ukraine	1–1	Friendly	Maria McAneny		
2 December 2025	Estadio Municipal de Chapín, Jerez (N)	China	3–2	Friendly	Kirsty Howat (2), Kirsty Hanson		
3 March 2026	Stade Émile Mayrisch, Esch (A)	Luxembourg	5–0	2027 World Cup qualifying	Caroline Weir (3), Jenna Clark, Kathleen McGovern		
7 March 2026	Hampden Park, Glasgow (H)	Luxembourg	7–0	2027 World Cup qualifying	Kathleen McGovern (2), Jenna Clark (2), Lauren Davidson, Emma Lawton, Maria McAneny		
14 April 2026	Easter Road, Edinburgh (H)	Belgium	1–1	2027 World Cup qualifying	Kathleen McGovern		
18 April 2026	Den Dreef, Leuven (A)	Belgium	0–0	2027 World Cup qualifying	—	4,052	
5 June 2026	Bozsik Aréna, Budapest (N)	Israel	6–0	2027 World Cup qualifying	Erin Cuthbert, Caroline Weir (3), Lauren Davidson, Kirsty Hanson	None	
9 June 2026	Bozsik Aréna, Budapest (N)	Israel	5–1	2027 World Cup qualifying	Caroline Weir (4), Jenna Clark	None	
9 October 2026	Stadion Arnošta Košťála, Pardubice (A)	Czech Republic	2–0	2027 World Cup qualifying	Caroline Weir, Claire Emslie		
13 October 2026	St Mirren Park, Paisley (H)	Czech Republic	3–2	2027 World Cup qualifying	Lauren Davidson, Kathleen McGovern, Christy Grimshaw		

== Record by opponent ==
As of match played on 5 June 2026

Opponent	Pld	W	D	L	GF	GA	GD	%W
Albania	1	1	0	0	3	0	+3	100.00
Australia	1	1	0	0	1	0	+1	100.00
Austria	3	1	0	2	1	2	−1	33.33
Belgium	4	0	4	0	3	3	+0	0.00
China	1	1	0	0	3	2	+1	100.00
Costa Rica	1	1	0	0	4	0	+4	100.00
Cyprus	1	1	0	0	10	0	+10	100.00
Czech Republic	2	2	0	0	5	2	+3	100.00
England	2	0	0	2	1	8	−7	0.00
Faroe Islands	2	2	0	0	13	1	+12	100.00
Finland	6	1	2	3	3	6	−3	16.67
Germany	2	0	0	2	1	10	−9	0.00
Hungary	5	4	1	0	9	1	+8	80.00
Iceland	2	1	0	1	1	2	−1	50.00
Israel	4	4	0	0	20	2	+18	100.00
Luxembourg	2	2	0	0	12	0	+12	100.00
Morocco	1	1	0	0	2	1	+1	100.00
Netherlands	5	0	1	4	3	10	−7	0.00
Northern Ireland	3	3	0	0	6	1	+5	100.00
Philippines	2	2	0	0	4	1	+3	100.00
Portugal	2	0	0	2	0	3	−3	0.00
Republic of Ireland	1	0	0	1	0	1	−1	0.00
Serbia	2	1	1	0	1	0	+1	50.00
Slovakia	3	3	0	0	5	0	+5	100.00
Spain	2	0	0	2	0	10	−10	0.00
Sweden	1	0	0	1	0	2	−2	0.00
Switzerland	1	0	0	1	3	4	−1	0.00
Ukraine	4	2	2	0	9	2	+7	50.00
Venezuela	1	1	0	0	2	1	+1	100.00
Wales	3	1	1	1	3	4	−1	33.33
Totals	59	32	11	16	118	63	+55	54.24

== See also ==
- Scotland at the FIFA Women's World Cup
- Scotland women's national football team 1972–99 results
- Scotland women's national football team 2000–09 results
- Scotland women's national football team 2010–19 results
