= Tony Macaroni =

Chain of Italian restaurants

- Type: Limited company
- Industry: Restaurants
- Genre: Casual dining
- Founded: 2007
- Headquarters: Glasgow, Scotland, UK, United Kingdom
- Number of locations: 13
- Area served: Scotland
- Website: www.tonymacaroni.co.uk

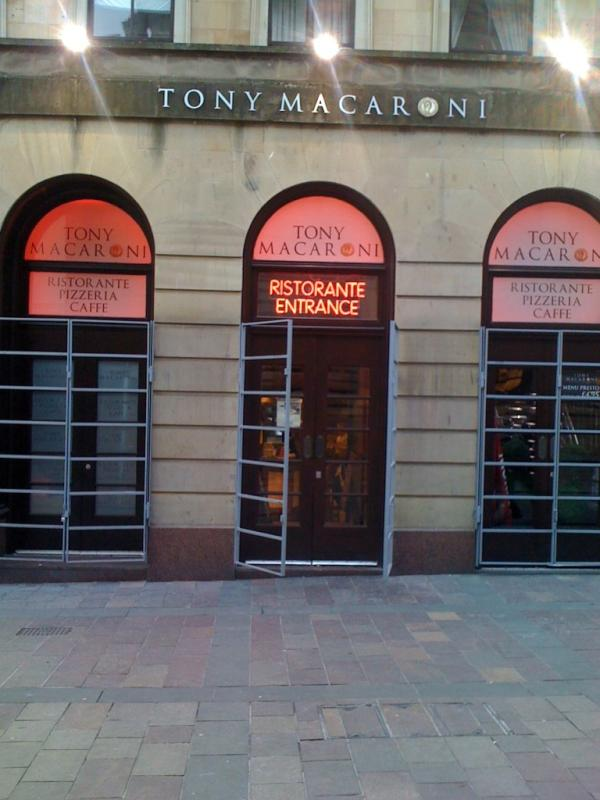
A Tony Macaroni restaurant in Glasgow. (2011)

Tony Macaroni is a group of restaurants in Scotland specialising in Italian cuisine. The slogan of the company is vive per mangiare ("live to eat"). It is the sister company of Nardini's, an ice cream parlour in Largs in North Ayrshire, Scotland, and Marini's, a Scottish chain of fish and chip shops. The company is managed by Viva Italia, a Scotland-based hospitality group with interests in dining, events, and fashion. The first restaurant in Scotland opened in 2007, in East Kilbride, South Lanarkshire. Since then, the brand has expanded across Scotland, operating 13 restaurant locations as of 2025.

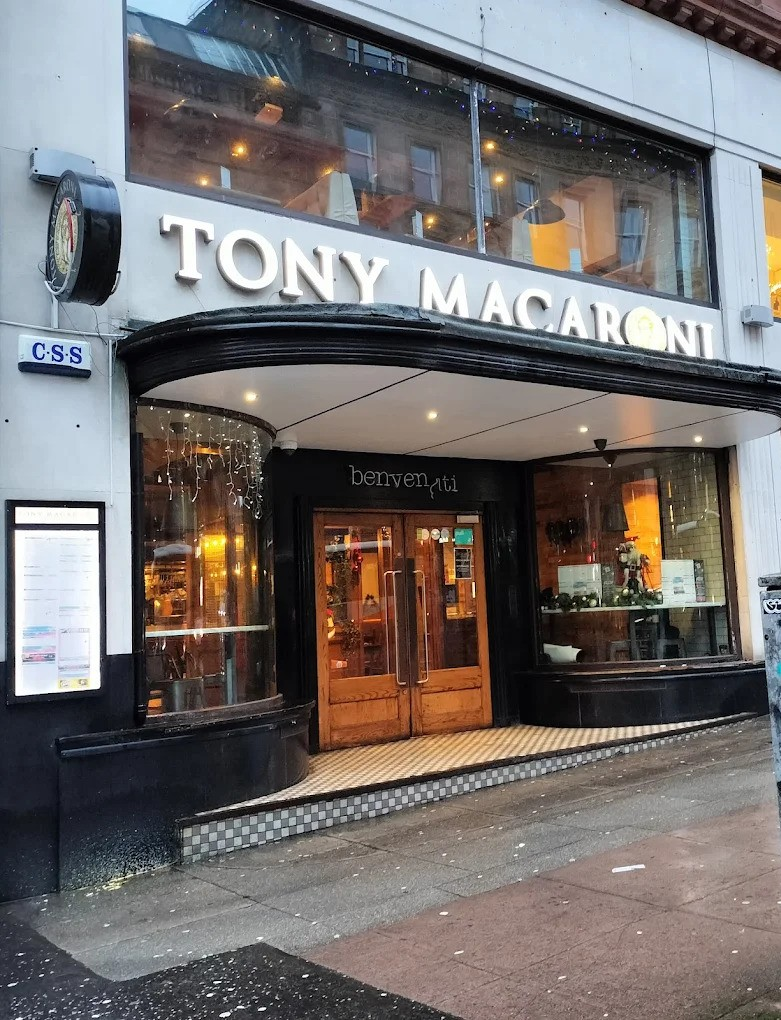
Tony Macaroni Glasgow City Centre 2025

== Sponsorship ==
In August 2013, Livingston F.C. announced a three-year kit sponsorship deal with Tony Macaroni. The club's Almondvale Stadium was renamed the Tony Macaroni Arena in 2015.

== See also ==
- List of Italian restaurants
