= 2008 Cyprus Women's Cup =

Tournament details
- Host country: Cyprus
- Dates: 5–12 March 2008
- Teams: 6 (from 3 confederations)
- Venue: 5 (in 4 host cities)

Final positions
- Champions: Canada (1st title)
- Runners-up: United States (U20)
- Third place: Japan
- Fourth place: Netherlands

Tournament statistics
- Matches played: 12
- Goals scored: 37 (3.08 per match)
- Top scorer: (Canada) Christine Sinclair (5 goals)

The 2008 Cyprus Women's Cup was the inaugural edition of the Cyprus Women's Cup, an invitational women's football tournament held annually in Cyprus. Six national teams, including five senior teams and one youth team, were invited: Canada, Netherlands, Japan, Russia, Scotland, and the United States U-20 team (the United States senior team competed in the concurrent 2008 Algarve Cup). Canada defeated the United States U-20 team in the final.

== Format ==
The tournament consisted of a group stage held over three match days followed by a single day of classification matches to determine the final standings.

For the group stage, the six teams were split into two groups of three teams. Each group played a round-robin tournament with each team playing one match against each other team in its group. In addition, on each group stage match day, one team from each group did not have a round-robin group match; these two teams played an exhibition match that was not counted towards the group stage standings.

The classification day then had three matches: a first place match between the group winners, a third place match between the runners-up, and a fifth place match between the bottom teams.

== Group stage ==
=== Group A ===
Team	Pld	W	D	L	GF	GA	GD	Pts
United States	2	2	0	0	4	1	+3	6
Netherlands	2	1	0	1	1	2	−1	3
Scotland	2	0	0	2	1	3	−2	0

5 March 2008

United States	2–1	Scotland
Enyeart 27'; O'Hara 32'	Report	Grant 87'

GSZ Stadium, Larnaca

7 March 2008

Scotland	0–1	Netherlands
		Stevens 49'

Paralimni Stadium, Paralimni

10 March 2008

Netherlands	0–2	United States
		O'Hara 32'; Enyeart 90+1'

GSZ Stadium, Larnaca

=== Group B ===
Team	Pld	W	D	L	GF	GA	GD	Pts
Canada	2	2	0	0	5	1	+4	6
Japan	2	1	0	1	3	4	−1	3
Russia	2	0	0	2	2	5	−3	0

5 March 2008

Canada	2–1	Russia
Armstrong 8'; Lang 50'		Barbashina 18'

Paralimni Stadium, Paralimni

7 March 2008

Japan	0–3	Canada
		Sinclair 22' (pen.), 42', 80'

GSZ Stadium, Larnaca

10 March 2008

Russia	1–3	Japan
Truntaeva 37'		Sakaguchi 28'; Ohno 51'; Utsugi 57'

Dasaki Stadium, Achna

=== Exhibition Matches ===
5 March 2008

Japan	3–1	Netherlands
Nagasato 35' (pen.); Sato 69'; Goto 70' (pen.)		Stevens 56'

Alpha Sports Center, Larnaca

7 March 2008

Russia	2–0	United States
Mokshanova 46'; Rogova 69'

Alpha Sports Center, Larnaca

10 March 2008

Scotland	2–0	Canada
Love 67'; Hamill 80'

Alpha Sports Center, Larnaca

== Placement matches ==
=== Fifth place match ===
12 March 2008

Russia	3–2	Scotland
Morozova 13', 57'; Truntaeva 85'		Little 21'; Thomson 87'

GSP Stadium, Nicosia

=== Third place match ===
12 March 2008

Netherlands	1–2	Japan
van Eyck 18'		Nagasato 23'; Utsugi 90'

GSP Stadium, Nicosia

=== Final ===
12 March 2008

Canada	3–2	United States
Sinclair 10', 37'; Filigno 22'	Report	Steinbruch 75', 86'

GSP Stadium, Nicosia

== Champion ==
2008 Cyprus Cup

Canada
First title

== Goalscorers ==
5 goals

- (Canada) Christine Sinclair

2 goals

- (Japan) Yuki Nagasato
- (Japan) Rumi Utsugi
- (Netherlands) Karin Stevens
- (Russia) Elena Morozova
- (Russia) Olesya Truntaeva
- (United States) Michelle Enyeart
- (United States) Kelley O'Hara
- (United States) Brittney Steinbruch

1 goal

- (Canada) Julie Armstrong
- (Canada) Jonelle Filigno
- (Canada) Kara Lang
- (Japan) Michi Goto
- (Japan) Shinobu Ohno
- (Japan) Mizuho Sakaguchi
- (Japan) Eriko Sato
- (Netherlands) Nangila van Eyck
- (Russia) Natalia Barbashina
- (Russia) Natalia Mokshanova
- (Russia) Alla Rogova
- (Scotland) Suzanne Grant
- (Scotland) Pauline Hamill
- (Scotland) Kim Little
- (Scotland) Joanne Love
- (Scotland) Hollie Thomson
