= Hollie Thomson =

Scottish footballer (born 1986)

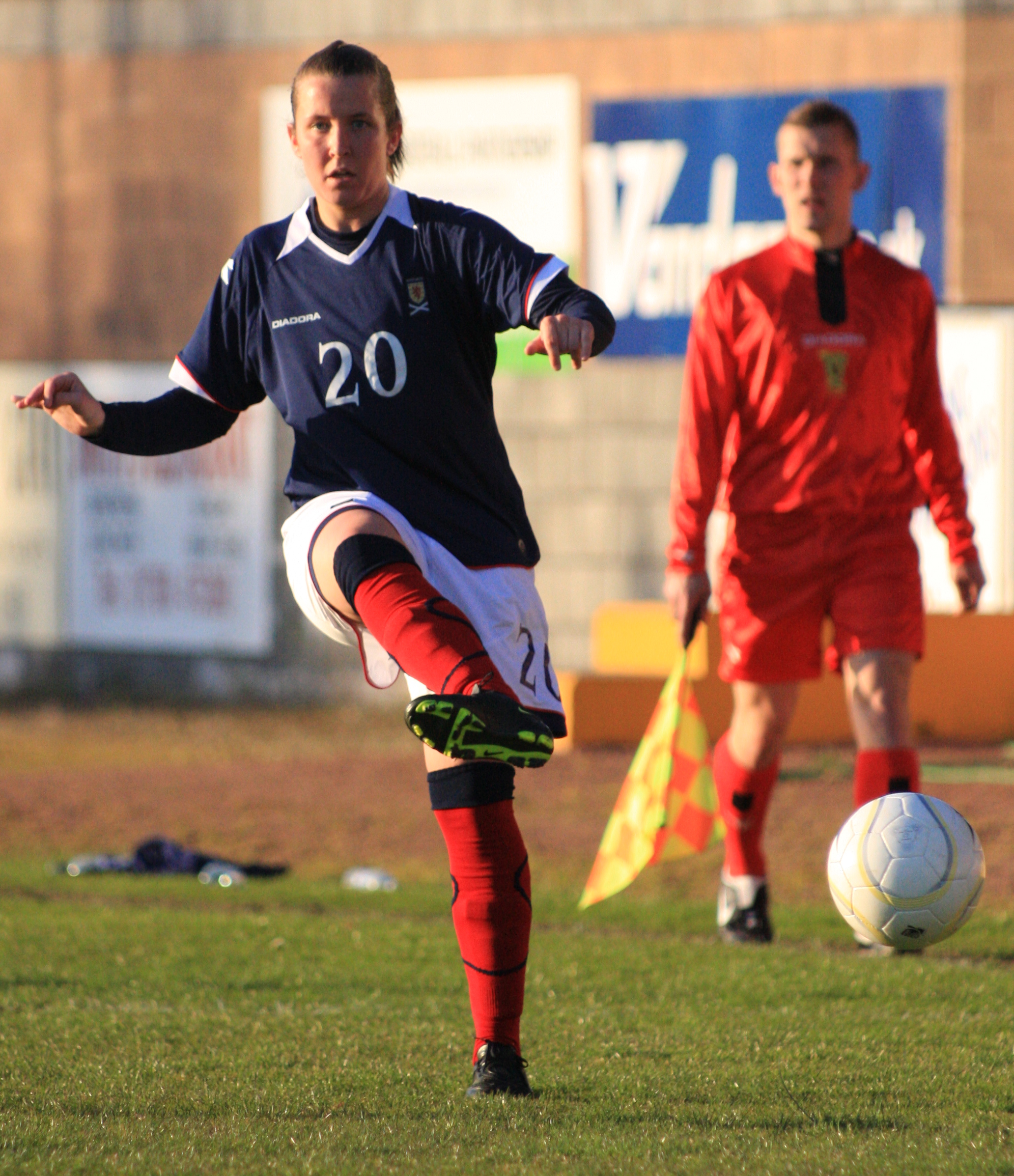
- Playing for Scotland in May 2009

Personal information
- Full name: Hollie Thomson
- Date of birth: 25 December 1986 (age 39)
- Place of birth: Blackpool, England
- Position: Midfielder

Youth career
- Our Lady’s
- Fleetwood Gym
- Huyton Fc Girls: Everton Fc Girls

College career
Years	Team	Apps	(Gls)
2002–2003	East Durham College		
2005–2007	Hamilton Academical		
2007-2012	Hibernian		
2013-2015	Rangers		

International career^{‡}
2000-2013	Scotland	48	(11)
- ‡ National team caps and goals as of 15:14, 4 June 2022 (UTC)

Hollie Thomson (born 25 December 1986) is a Scottish former football midfielder Hollie also played professional abroad and in England before she moved to Scotland and played for Scottish Women's Premier League (SWPL) clubs Hamilton Academical, Hibernian, Rangers She has represented the Scotland women's national football team at youth and senior level getting a call up for senior level at the age of 14. Hollie also got scouted by England under both Mo Marley and Hope Powell. Football runs deep in the family with Hollie’s Dad also been a professional footballer.

== Early life ==
Thomson's father Bobby was also a footballer. She was born and grew up in England, where Bobby had played for Blackpool.

== Club career ==
In 2008 Thomson emulated her father Bobby by signing for Hibernian: "I always strive to get better and when Hibs asked me to join I didn't think twice about it. Hibernian is a big and very successful club and I wanted to be part of that." In 2013 she transferred to Rangers, after falling into dispute with the manager of Hibernian.

== International career ==
In September 2003, while attached to East Durham College, Thomson was named in the Scotland women's national under-19 football team by coach Tony Gervaise. As a Civil Service Strollers player she scored twice in a 4–1 win over Israel in May 2005, which qualified Scotland for the UEFA Women's Under-19 Championship finals for the first time. In the final tournament

According to the Scottish Football Association (SFA), Thomson made her senior Scotland debut in a 1–0 friendly defeat by Finland at Veritas Stadion, Turku in September 2007. Other sources indicate she featured as a 72nd-minute substitute for Pauline Hamill in a 4–0 2007 FIFA Women's World Cup qualification (UEFA) defeat by Russia at McDiarmid Park on 24 May 2006. She scored her first and only senior goal for Scotland at the 2008 Cyprus Women's Cup, in a 3–2 defeat by Russia.

=== International goals ===
Scores and results list Scotland's goal tally first.

#	Date	Venue	Opponent	Result	Competition
1.	12 March 2008	GSP Stadium, Nicosia	Russia	2–3	2008 Cyprus Cup
