= Eriko Sato (footballer) =

Japanese footballer

Eriko Sato 佐藤 衣里子
Personal information
- Full name: Eriko Sato
- Date of birth: November 25, 1985 (age 40)
- Place of birth: Shizuoka, Japan
- Position: Midfielder

Youth career
- Waseda University

Senior career*
Years	Team	Apps	(Gls)
2008–2010	TEPCO Mareeze		
2014–2019	Orca Kamogawa FC		

International career
2003–2008	Japan	2	(0)
- * Club domestic league appearances and goals

Eriko Sato (佐藤 衣里子, Satō Eriko), born November 25, 1985, is a former Japanese football player. She played for the Japan national team.

== Club career ==
Sato was born in Shizuoka Prefecture on November 25, 1985. While at Waseda University, Sato was chosen as one of four specially designated players to join a professional team upon graduation. She joined TEPCO Mareeze in 2008. She played with TEPCO Mareeze until 2010.

After a three year hiatus from 2010 to 2013, Sato joined Orca Kamogawa FC in 2014 and played for them until her retirement in 2019.

== National team career ==
On July 27, 2003, when Sato was 17 years old, she debuted for the Japan national team against Australia. She played 2 games for Japan between 2003 and 2008.

In 2005 she was a member of the Japanese team which won a bronze medal at the 23rd University Games in Izmir. They beat the French team 2-0 to secured the medal.

== National team statistics ==
Japan national team
Year	Apps	Goals
2003	1	0
2004	0	0
2005	0	0
2006	0	0
2007	0	0
2008	1	0
Total	2	0
