= Kalomoira Kontomichi =

Greek footballer

Personal information
- Full name: Kalomoira Kontomichi
- Date of birth: 3 August 1984 (age 42)
- Place of birth: Lefkada, Greece
- Height: 1.72 m (5 ft 7 1/2 in)
- Position: Forward

Senior career*
Years	Team	Apps	(Gls)
2002–2012	Kallithea		
2012–2015	Atromitos		

International career
2005–2011	Greece	14	(3)

Managerial career
- 2012–2020: Atromitos
- 2020–: Nees Atromitou
- * Club domestic league appearances and goals

Kalomoira Kontomichi (Greek: Καλομοίρα Κοντομίχη; born 3 August 1984) is a Greek football player.

Kontomichi plays her club football for Kallithea in the Greek Women's Alpha Ethniki.

Kontomichi appeared seven times for the Greece women's national football team in the 2007 FIFA Women's World Cup qualifying rounds. She has also played for the team in the 2011 FIFA Women's World Cup qualifying rounds, scoring a hat-trick in a 5–0 home victory over Georgia on 26 November 2009.
