= Almondvale Stadium =

Football stadium in Livingston, Scotland

The Home of the Set Fare Arena
- The Spaghettihad
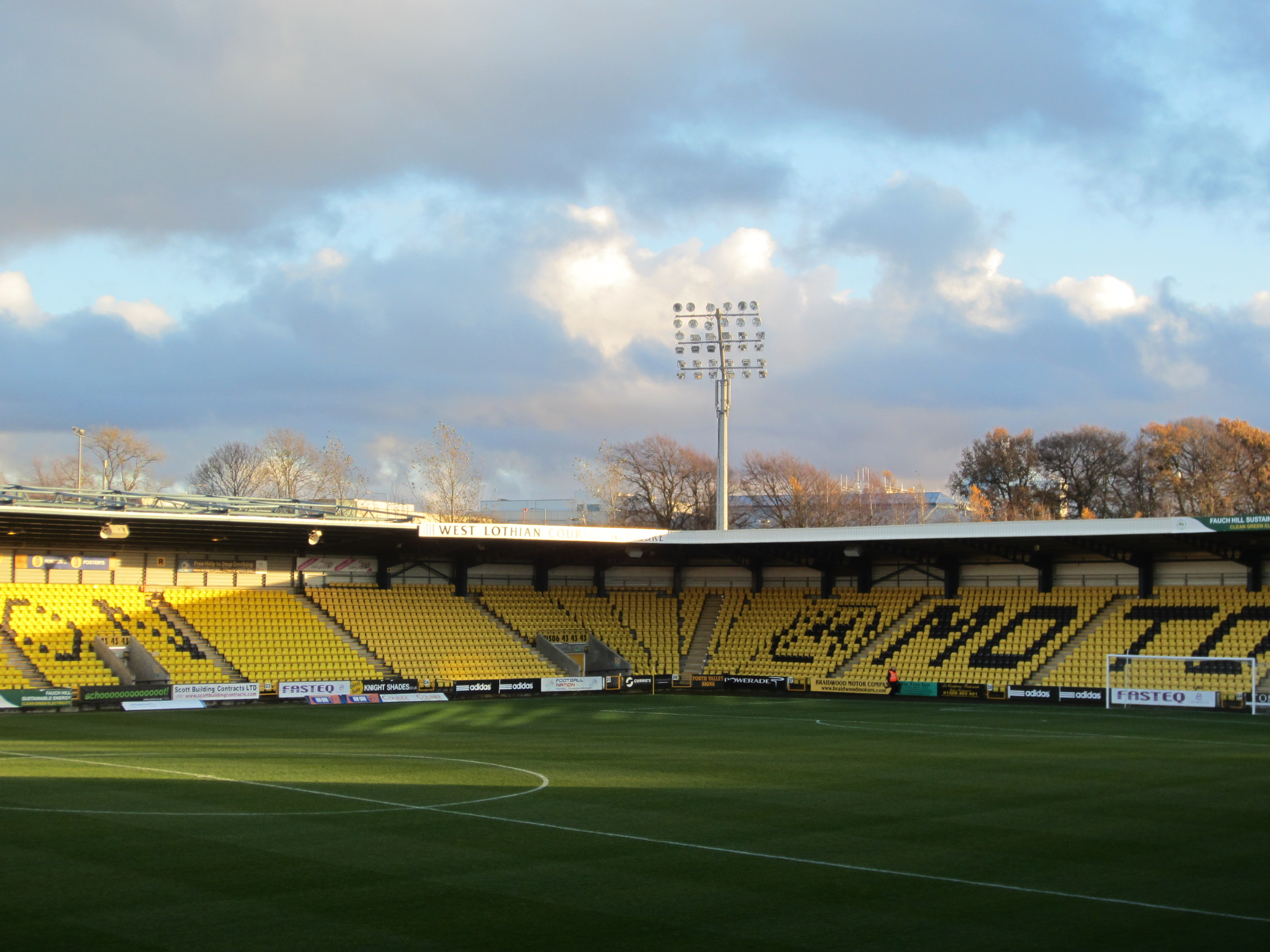
- Almondvale Stadium in 2012

- Location in West Lothian
- Former names: Tony Macaroni Arena
- Location: Livingston, West Lothian, Scotland
- Coordinates: 55°53′9″N 3°31′19″W
- Owner: West Lothian Council
- Capacity: 9,713
- Surface: Artificial turf
- Record attendance: 10,112 v Rangers F.C. (27 October 2001)
- Field size: 98m x 69m

Construction
- Opened: 1995

Tenant
- Livingston F.C. (1995–present)

Almondvale Stadium, also known as the Home of the Set Fare Arena for sponsorship purposes, is a football stadium, located in the Almondvale area of Livingston, West Lothian, Scotland. It has been the home ground of Scottish Championship club Livingston since 1995, and has an all-seater capacity of 9,713.

Between 2014 and 2024, due to restaurant chain Tony Macaroni's naming rights, the stadium was humorously referred to as the "Spaghettihad"; a play on Manchester City's Etihad Stadium.

== History ==
The stadium was constructed in 1995 as a joint venture between Edinburgh football club Meadowbank Thistle F.C. and the Livingston Development Corporation (LDC). Part of the deal involved the relocation of Meadowbank Thistle to the town and a name change to Livingston. When the LDC was wound up, ownership of the Stadium was transferred to West Lothian Council. It is hired by Livingston from West Lothian Council every year. Livingston initially rapidly moved up the divisions of Scottish football, and the stadium was expanded to meet Scottish Premier League (SPL) standards in time for the club's promotion to the top flight in 2001. The record attendance for a Livingston match at Almondvale is 10,112 and was set during that first season in the SPL, for a match against Rangers on 27 October 2001.

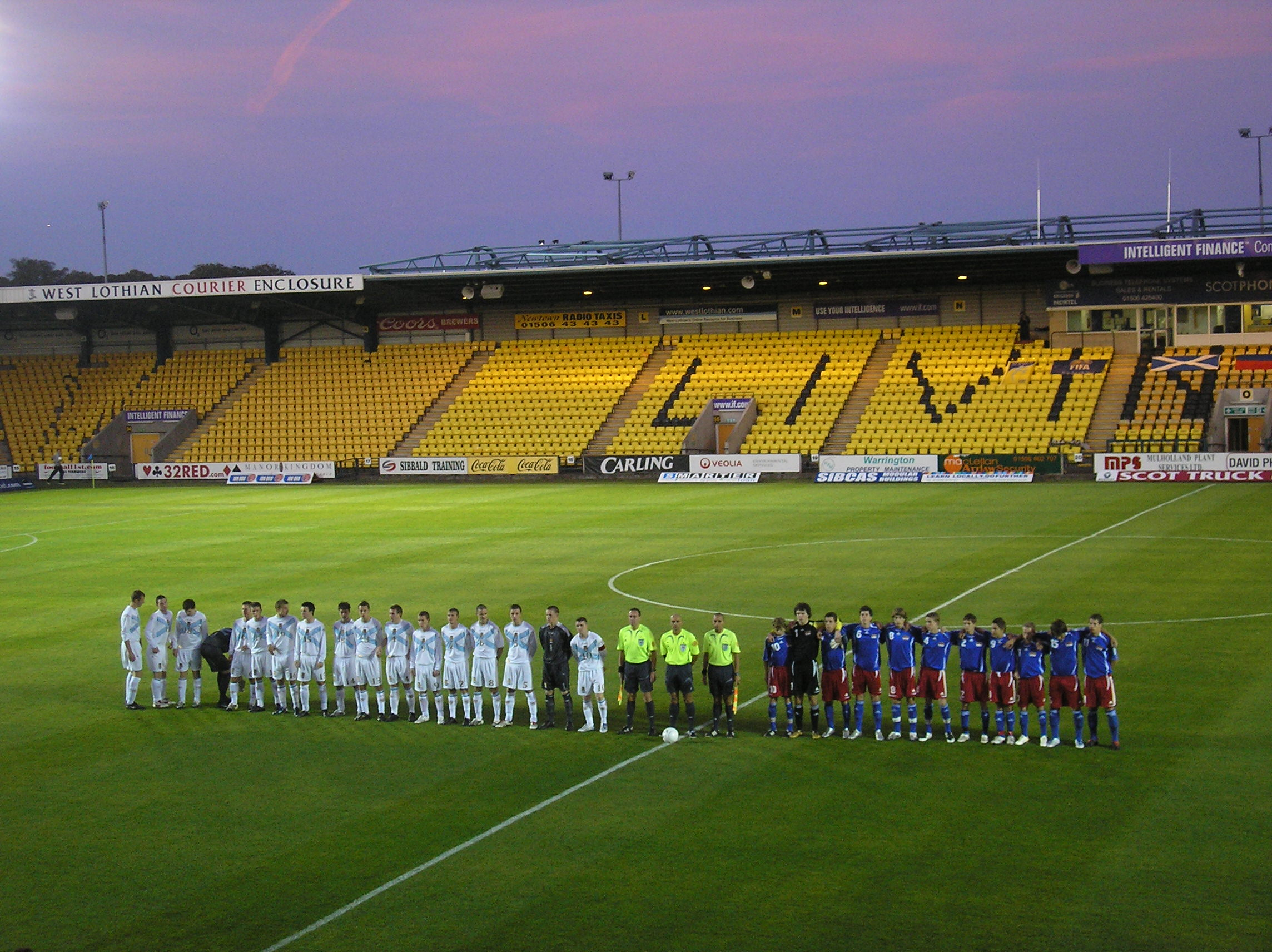
Almondvale pictured in 2007 during an international friendly

The stadium has changed names several times due to sponsorship deals. It was previously officially titled the City Stadium in the early 2000s due to a sponsorship deal with the City group. It had also been called the West Lothian Courier Stadium before that. However, after the club were taken over by the Lionheart Consortium in 2005, it reverted to its original name, Almondvale Stadium. It was renamed 'Braidwood Motor Company Stadium' in a three-year naming rights deal in May 2010. In June 2013, it was renamed again for sponsorship reasons to 'Energy Assets Arena'. In September 2015, it was renamed again for sponsorship reasons to the 'Tony Macaroni Arena'. The club announced the end of the sponsorship deal in March 2024.

On 7 April 2011, there were rumours that the stadium could be sold off to a supermarket development, and in turn finance a new stadium, of slightly smaller design, a mile away. However, nothing came of these rumours.

== Structure and facilities ==
Almondvale is a 9,713 capacity all-seater ground. It has four stands which are all roughly of the same height and two corners of the ground are filled with covered seating. There is an open corner on one side of the West Stand and there is also the 5-storey stadium house in the other corner of the ground which is primarily used for conferences and offices. All the stands are one tier high and the stadium has four large floodlights, one situated at each corner of the ground. The stadium is covered and shielded from the weather elements by the roof and the windshields at the side of the stands. Almondvale also has a red blaes pitch and fully operational under-soil heating.

== Women's football ==
In August 1997, Almondvale hosted the Scotland–England women's international match. In 2001, Almondvale was named the Scottish Football Association's centre for women's football. It hosted the Scottish Women's Cup final and the national team's matches from 2001 to 2004.

The stadium was the home ground of Hibernian W.F.C. in 2021–22.

== Other uses ==
In 2008, Gretna played one match in the stadium, a 3–0 loss against Celtic, when their temporary home (Fir Park) had problems with its pitch.

In 2013, Albion Rovers played their cup tie against Rangers at Almondvale in front of a crowd of 5,345.

Over the years, it has also been chosen to host Scotland under-21, under-19, and under-17 matches.

The stadium has hosted the 2012 and the 2013 Challenge Cup finals. On 27 May 2012, the stadium hosted the 2012 Scottish Junior Cup Final.

Hibernian Reserves also used the Stadium.

== Location and transport ==
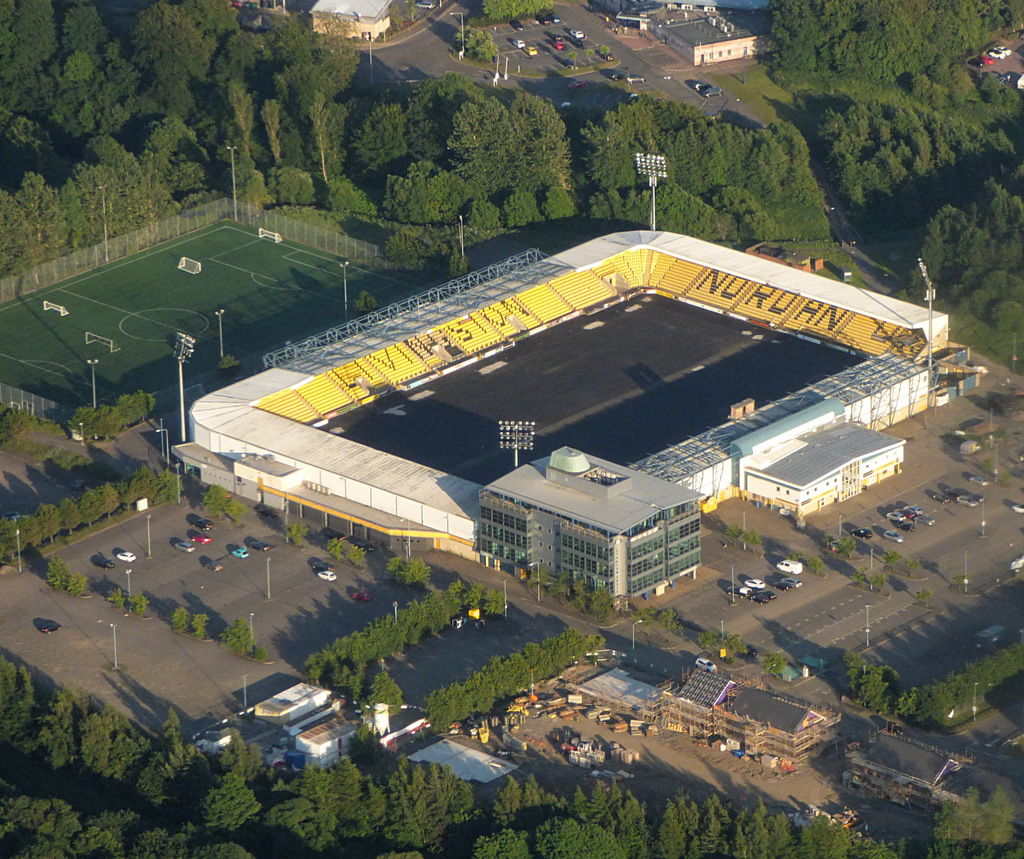
Aerial view of the stadium in June 2018

The town of Livingston is situated in the central belt of Scotland, approximately 18 miles west of Edinburgh and 33 miles east of Glasgow, and easily accessible from the M8 motorway. The stadium is located at the centre of the town, in the Almondvale district, near the shopping centre and situated by the River Almond. The ground is signposted reasonably well around the town for the convenience of road traffic. Parking spaces are abundantly found in close proximity to the stadium, either near the shopping centre or at the stadium.

There are two railway stations in reach of the ground; Livingston North and Livingston South. The North station is served by trains from Edinburgh and Glasgow and is about a 30-minute walk away from the ground. The South station also receives trains from both Edinburgh and Glasgow and is about a 40-minute walk away from the stadium. In addition to the train stations, the central bus terminal at Livingston is located on Almondvale Avenue, 5 minutes walk from the ground.

== See also ==
- Stadium relocations in Scottish football
