= Camilla Sand Andersen =

Danish footballer (born 1986)

Camilla Sand
Personal information
- Full name: Camilla Sand Andersen
- Date of birth: 14 February 1986 (age 40)
- Position: Defender

Senior career*
Years	Team	Apps	(Gls)
- ASV
2006–2013	Fortuna Hjørring	141	

International career
2005–2009	Denmark	33	(8)
- * Club domestic league appearances and goals

Camilla Sand Andersen (born 14 February 1986 in Als, Hadsund) is a Danish football midfielder. She currently plays for Fortuna Hjørring and the Danish national team.
