= Ana Poghosian =

Georgian association footballer and rugby union player

Ana Pogosian
Personal information
- Full name: Ana Botuna
- Birth name: Ana Poghosyan
- Date of birth: 14 July 1984 (age 42)
- Height: 1.72 m (5 ft 8 in)
- Positions: Forward; midfielder

Team information
- Current team: Chkhorotsku

Senior career*
Years	Team	Apps	(Gls)
- FC Iveria
- Norchi Dinamoeli
201?–2019	Nike		
2019–	Chkhorotsku		

International career^{‡}
2009–	Georgia	8	(1)
- * Club domestic league appearances and goals ‡ National team caps and goals as of 18 September 2015

Ana Botuna (née Poghosyan, also spelled Poghosian, Pogosian and Pogosyan; born 14 July 1984), known in association football as Ana Pogosian (Georgian: ანა პოღოსიანი), is a Georgian retired rugby sevens player and a current footballer who plays as a forward for Women's Championship club Chkhorotsku and the Georgia women's national team. She is of both Armenian and Georgian descent.

== Rugby career ==
Poghosian began playing rugby in 2005, when the sport began in Georgia. She captained the Georgia Lady 7s team that played in their first European Championship in 2008. She also participates in forwarding the sport in Georgia by refereeing the "Didi 10", a Georgian championship.

The Georgian sevens team moved from division B to division A in 2012.

By 2013, the Lady Lelos were playing in multiple tournaments a year. In 2013 alone, they played in Odessa International Women Sevens (finishing in third place) and Amsterdam Sevens (finishing fifth out of sixteen teams).

In June 2013, she and the Georgian national sevens team, nicked named the Lady Lelos, went to Prague to compete in the Rugby Europe Women's Sevens Division A (then called the FIRA–AER Women's Sevens). She captained the team.

The Georgian Lady Sevens attended four tournaments in 2015: Ghent International Tournament, Nancy's Lady Sevens and Amsterdam Sevens, and the European Championship.

Poghosian was presented with the Female Rugby Player of 2014 and 2015, in partnership with UN Women.
