= 2013–14 in Scottish football =

Scottish sporting season

Football in Scotland
- Season: 2013–14

2013–14 in Scottish football

Premiership champions
- Celtic

Championship champions
- Dundee

League 1 champions
- Rangers

League 2 champions
- Peterhead

Scottish Cup winners
- St Johnstone

League Cup winners
- Aberdeen

Challenge Cup winners
- Raith Rovers

Youth Cup winners
- Rangers

Teams in Europe
- Celtic, Motherwell, St Johnstone, Hibernian

Scotland national team
- World Cup 2014 qualifying

The 2013–14 season was the 117th season of competitive football in Scotland. The season began on 13 July 2013, with the start of the Challenge Cup.

== League competitions ==
=== Scottish Premiership ===
Pos	Team	Pld	W	D	L	GF	GA	GD	Pts	Qualification or relegation
1	Celtic (C)	38	31	6	1	102	25	+77	99	Qualification for the Champions League second qualifying round
2	Motherwell	38	22	4	12	64	60	+4	70	Qualification for the Europa League second qualifying round
3	Aberdeen	38	20	8	10	53	38	+15	68	Qualification for the Europa League first qualifying round
4	Dundee United	38	16	10	12	65	50	+15	58	
5	Inverness Caledonian Thistle	38	16	9	13	44	44	0	57	
6	St Johnstone	38	15	8	15	48	42	+6	53	Qualification for the Europa League second qualifying round (Note: St Johnstone, as winners of the 2013–14 Scottish Cup, qualified for the Europa League second qualifying round.)
7	Ross County	38	11	7	20	44	62	−18	40	
8	St Mirren	38	10	9	19	39	58	−19	39	
9	Kilmarnock	38	11	6	21	45	66	−21	39	
10	Partick Thistle	38	8	14	16	46	65	−19	38	
11	Hibernian (R)	38	8	11	19	31	51	−20	35	Qualification for the Premiership play-off final
12	Heart of Midlothian (R)	38	10	8	20	45	65	−20	23 (Note: Heart of Midlothian were deducted 15 points for entering administration)	Relegation to the Championship

Source: SPFL Archive
Rules for classification: 1) points; 2) goal difference; 3) number of goals scored.
(C) Champions; (R) Relegated

=== Scottish Championship ===
Pos	Team	Pld	W	D	L	GF	GA	GD	Pts	Promotion, qualification or relegation
1	Dundee (C, P)	36	21	6	9	54	26	+28	69	Promotion to the Premiership
2	Hamilton Academical (O, P)	36	19	10	7	68	41	+27	67	Qualification for the Premiership play-off semi-final
3	Falkirk	36	19	9	8	59	33	+26	66	Qualification for the Premiership play-off quarter-final
4	Queen of the South	36	16	7	13	53	39	+14	55	Qualification for the Premiership play-off quarter-final
5	Dumbarton	36	15	6	15	65	64	+1	51	
6	Livingston	36	13	7	16	51	56	−5	46	
7	Raith Rovers	36	11	9	16	48	61	−13	42	
8	Alloa Athletic	36	11	7	18	34	51	−17	40	
9	Cowdenbeath (O)	36	11	7	18	50	72	−22	40	Qualification for the Championship play-offs
10	Greenock Morton (R)	36	6	8	22	32	71	−39	26	Relegation to League One

Source: Soccerway
Rules for classification: 1) points; 2) goal difference; 3) number of goals scored.
(C) Champions; (O) Play-off winners; (P) Promoted; (R) Relegated

=== Scottish League One ===
Pos	Team	Pld	W	D	L	GF	GA	GD	Pts	Qualification or relegation
1	Rangers (C, P)	36	33	3	0	106	18	+88	102	Promotion to the Championship
2	Dunfermline Athletic	36	19	6	11	68	54	+14	63	Qualification for the Championship play-offs
3	Stranraer	36	14	9	13	57	57	0	51	Qualification for the Championship play-offs
4	Ayr United	36	14	7	15	65	66	−1	49	Qualification for the Championship play-offs
5	Stenhousemuir	36	12	12	12	57	66	−9	48	
6	Airdrieonians	36	12	9	15	47	57	−10	45	
7	Forfar Athletic	36	12	7	17	55	62	−7	43	
8	Brechin City	36	12	6	18	57	71	−14	42	
9	East Fife (R)	36	9	5	22	31	69	−38	32	Qualification for the League One play-offs
10	Arbroath (R)	36	9	4	23	52	75	−23	31	Relegation to League Two

Source: SPFL
Rules for classification: 1) points; 2) goal difference; 3) number of goals scored.
(C) Champions; (P) Promoted; (R) Relegated

=== Scottish League Two ===
Pos	Team	Pld	W	D	L	GF	GA	GD	Pts	Promotion or qualification
1	Peterhead (C, P)	36	23	7	6	74	38	+36	76	Promotion to League One
2	Annan Athletic	36	19	6	11	69	49	+20	63	Qualification for the League One play-offs
3	Stirling Albion (O, P)	36	16	10	10	60	50	+10	58	Qualification for the League One play-offs
4	Clyde	36	17	6	13	50	48	+2	57	Qualification for the League One play-offs
5	Berwick Rangers	36	15	7	14	63	49	+14	52	
6	Montrose	36	12	10	14	44	56	−12	46	
7	Albion Rovers	36	12	8	16	41	54	−13	44	
8	East Stirlingshire	36	12	8	16	45	59	−14	44	
9	Elgin City	36	9	9	18	62	73	−11	36	
10	Queen's Park	36	5	9	22	36	68	−32	24	

Source: SPFL
Rules for classification: 1) points; 2) goal difference; 3) number of goals scored.
(C) Champions; (O) Play-off winners; (P) Promoted

=== Non-league football ===
Highland Football League
Pos	Team	Pld	Pts
1	Brora Rangers (C)	34	95
2	Inverurie Loco Works	34	75
3	Nairn County	34	75
4	Formartine United	34	72
5	Fraserburgh	34	71
6	Deveronvale	34	65
7	Cove Rangers	34	55
8	Wick Academy	34	53
9	Forres Mechanics	34	52
10	Buckie Thistle	34	49
11	Clachnacuddin	34	46
12	Turriff United	34	44
13	Huntly	34	35
14	Keith	34	29
15	Lossiemouth	34	20
16	Strathspey Thistle	34	12
17	Rothes	34	12
18	Fort William	34	9

Source: Soccerway
(C) Champions

Lowland Football League
Pos	Team	Pld	Pts
1	The Spartans (C)	22	49
2	Stirling University	22	45
3	Dalbeattie Star	22	40
4	Whitehill Welfare	22	39
5	Edinburgh City	22	37
6	Gretna 2008	22	31
7	Vale of Leithen	22	30
8	East Kilbride	22	28
9	Preston Athletic	22	24
10	Gala Fairydean Rovers	22	23
11	Threave Rovers	22	17
12	Selkirk	22	5

Source: Soccerway
(C) Champions

=== SPFL U20 League ===
Pos	Team	Pld	W	D	L	GF	GA	GD	Pts
1	Celtic	30	21	2	7	60	27	+33	65
2	Rangers	30	19	7	4	62	30	+32	64
3	Hibernian	30	17	8	5	71	38	+33	59
4	Hamilton Academical	30	15	6	9	56	45	+11	51
5	Motherwell	30	15	3	12	61	54	+7	48
6	Inverness Caledonian Thistle	30	13	4	13	56	51	+5	43
7	Kilmarnock	30	11	6	13	48	53	−5	39
8	Falkirk	30	10	9	11	48	61	−13	39
9	Aberdeen	30	11	5	14	50	51	−1	38
10	Dunfermline Athletic	30	10	6	14	51	53	−2	36
11	St Johnstone	30	9	8	13	51	58	−7	35
12	Dundee United	30	10	4	16	40	43	−3	34
13	Ross County	30	10	4	16	43	63	−20	34
14	Partick Thistle	30	9	6	15	37	61	−24	33
15	St Mirren	30	9	5	16	37	53	−16	32
16	Heart of Midlothian	30	7	5	18	40	70	−30	26

Source: SPFL
Rules for classification: 1) points; 2) goal difference; 3) number of goals scored.

== Honours ==
=== Cup honours ===
Competition	Winner	Score	Runner-up	Match report
2013–14 Scottish Cup	St Johnstone	2 – 0	Dundee United	Report
2013–14 League Cup	Aberdeen	0 – 0 (a.e.t.); 4 – 2 pens.	Inverness Caledonian Thistle	Report
2013–14 Challenge Cup	Raith Rovers	1 – 0 (a.e.t.)	Rangers	Report
2013–14 Youth Cup	Rangers	2 – 2 (a.e.t.); 8 – 7 pens.	Heart of Midlothian	Report
2013–14 Junior Cup	Hurlford United	3 – 0	Glenafton Athletic	Report
2013–14 Amateur Cup	Hurlford Thistle	3 – 3 (a.e.t.); 4 – 3 pens.	Colville Park	Report

=== Non-league honours ===
==== Senior ====
Competition	Winner
Highland League	Brora Rangers
Lowland League	Spartans
East of Scotland League	Lothian Thistle Hutchison Vale
South of Scotland League	Wigtown & Bladnoch

==== Junior ====
West Region

Division	Winner
Super League Premier Division	Auchinleck Talbot
Super League First Division	Troon
Ayrshire District League	Irvine Victoria
Central District League First Division	Neilston Juniors
Central District League Second Division	Blantyre Victoria

East Region

Division	Winner
Superleague	Bo'ness United
Premier League	Penicuik Athletic
North Division	Dundee North End
South Division	Edinburgh United

North Region

Division	Winner
Superleague	Culter
First Division (West)	Inverness City
First Division (East)	Cruden Bay

=== Individual honours ===
==== PFA Scotland awards ====
Award	Winner	Team
Players' Player of the Year	Kris Commons	Celtic
Young Player of the Year	Andrew Robertson	Dundee United
Manager of the Year	Derek McInnes	Aberdeen
Championship Player of Year	Kane Hemmings	Cowdenbeath
League One Player of Year	Lee Wallace	Rangers
League Two Player of Year	Rory McAllister	Peterhead

==== SFWA awards ====
Award	Winner	Team
Footballer of the Year	Kris Commons	Celtic
Young Player of the Year	Stevie May	St Johnstone
Manager of the Year	Derek McInnes	Aberdeen
International Player of the Year	Robert Snodgrass	Norwich City

== Scottish clubs in Europe ==
=== Celtic ===
2013–14 UEFA Champions League

17 July 2013 Second qualifying round	Cliftonville (Northern Ireland)	0 – 3	(Scotland) Celtic	Belfast
19:45		Report	Lustig 25'; Samaras 31'; Forrest 84'	Stadium: Solitude; Attendance: 5,442; Referee: Serhiy Boyko (Ukraine)

23 July 2013 Second qualifying round	Celtic (Scotland)	2 – 0 (5 – 0 agg.)	(Northern Ireland) Cliftonville	Glasgow
19:45	Ambrose 16'; Samaras 70'	Report		Stadium: Celtic Park; Attendance: 29,758; Referee: Thorsten Kinhöfer (Germany)

31 July 2013 Third qualifying round	Celtic (Scotland)	1 – 0	(Sweden) Elfsborg	Glasgow
19:45	Commons 76'	Report		Stadium: Celtic Park; Attendance: 40,300; Referee: Manuel De Sousa (Portugal)

7 August 2013 Third qualifying round	Elfsborg (Sweden)	0 – 0 (0 – 1 agg.)	(Scotland) Celtic	Borås
19:45		Report		Stadium: Borås Arena; Attendance: 9,040; Referee: Vladislav Bezborodov (Russia)

20 August 2013 Play-off round	Shakhter Karagandy (Kazakhstan)	2 – 0	(Scotland) Celtic	Karagandy
16:00	Finonchenko 12'; Khiznichenko 77'	Report		Stadium: Shakhtyor Stadium; Attendance: 20,000; Referee: Pavel Kralovec (Czech Republic)

28 August 2013 Play-off round	Celtic (Scotland)	3 – 0 (3 – 2 agg.)	(Kazakhstan) Shakhter Karagandy	Glasgow
19:45	Commons 45+1'; Samaras 48'; Forrest 90+2'	Report		Stadium: Celtic Park; Attendance: 50,063; Referee: Svein Oddvar Moen (Norway)

18 September 2013 Group H	Milan (Italy)	2 – 0	(Scotland) Celtic	Milan
20:45	Izaguirre 81' (o.g.); Muntari 85'	Report		Stadium: San Siro; Attendance: 43,000; Referee: Wolfgang Stark (Germany)

1 October 2013 Group H	Celtic (Scotland)	0 – 1	(Spain) Barcelona	Glasgow
20:45		Report	Fàbregas 75'	Stadium: Celtic Park; Referee: Stéphane Lannoy (France)

22 October 2013 Group H	Celtic (Scotland)	2 – 1	(Netherlands) Ajax	Glasgow
20:45	Forrest 43' (pen.); Kayal 53'	Report	Schöne 90+4'	Stadium: Celtic Park; Referee: Ivan Bebek (Croatia)

6 November 2013 Group H	Ajax (Netherlands)	1 – 0	(Scotland) Celtic	Amsterdam
20:45	Schöne 51'	Report		Stadium: Amsterdam Arena; Referee: Deniz Aytekin

26 November 2013 Group H	Celtic (Scotland)	0 – 3	(Italy) Milan	Glasgow
20:45		Report	Kaká 13'; Zapata 49'; Balotelli 60'	Stadium: Celtic Park; Attendance: 58,619; Referee: Cüneyt Çakır (Turkey)

11 December 2013 Group H	Barcelona (Spain)	6 – 1	(Scotland) Celtic	Barcelona
20:45	Piqué 7'; Pedro 40'; Neymar 44', 48', 58'; Tello 72'	Report	Samaras 88'	Stadium: Camp Nou; Attendance: 54,342; Referee: Sergei Karasev (Russia)

=== Motherwell ===
2013–14 UEFA Europa League

1 August 2013 Third qualifying round	Motherwell (Scotland)	0 – 2	(Russia) Kuban Krasnodar	Motherwell
19:45		Report	Popov 52', 78'	Stadium: Fir Park; Attendance: 6,748; Referee: Alain Bieri (Switzerland)

8 August 2013 Third qualifying round	Kuban Krasnodar (Russia)	1 – 0 (3 – 0 agg.)	(Scotland) Motherwell	Krasnodar
18:00	McManus 50' (o.g.)	Report		Stadium: Kuban Stadium; Attendance: 31,754; Referee: Cristian Balaj (Romania)

=== St Johnstone ===
2013–14 UEFA Europa League

18 July 2013 Second qualifying round	Rosenborg (Norway)	0 – 1	(Scotland) St Johnstone	Trondheim
18:00		Report	Wright 18'	Stadium: Lerkendal Stadium; Attendance: 5,952; Referee: Halis Özkahya (Turkey)

25 July 2013 Second qualifying round	St Johnstone (Scotland)	1 – 1 (2 – 1 agg.)	(Norway) Rosenborg	Perth
19:45	May 21'	Report	Søderlund 4'	Stadium: McDiarmid Park; Attendance: 7,850; Referee: Miroslav Zelinka (Czech Republic)

1 August 2013 Third Qualifying Round	Minsk (Belarus)	0 – 1	(Scotland) St Johnstone	Grodno
19:45			MacLean 69'	Stadium: Neman Stadium; Referee: Marcin Borski (Poland)

8 August 2013 Third Qualifying Round	St Johnstone (Scotland)	0 – 1 (a.e.t.) (1 – 1 agg.) (2 – 3 p)	(Belarus) Minsk	Perth
19:45		Report	Rnić 75'	Stadium: McDiarmid Park; Attendance: 8,594; Referee: Pavle Radovanović (Montenegro)
	Penalties
	Mackay (penalty missed); Cregg (penalty missed); Fallon (penalty scored); Edwards (penalty scored); MacLean (penalty missed)		(penalty scored) Vasilyuk; (penalty scored) Razin; (penalty scored) Sverchinskiy; (penalty missed) Kibuk; (penalty missed) Kazeka

=== Hibernian ===
2013–14 UEFA Europa League

18 July 2013 Second qualifying round	Malmö FF (Sweden)	2 – 0	(Scotland) Hibernian	Malmö
18:00	Hamad 11'; Eriksson 13'	Report		Stadium: Swedbank Stadion; Attendance: 8,628; Referee: Rene Eisner (Austria)

25 July 2013 Second qualifying round	Hibernian (Scotland)	0 – 7 (0 – 9 agg.)	(Sweden) Malmö	Edinburgh
19:45		Report	Eriksson 21'; Forsberg 26'; Halsti 30'; Albornoz 41'; Rantie 61'; Hamad 65'; Kroon 71'	Stadium: Easter Road; Attendance: 16,018; Referee: Sébastien Delferiere (Belgium)

== Scotland national team ==
13 August 2013 Friendly	England	3 – 2	Scotland	London
20:00 BST	Walcott 29'; Welbeck 53'; Lambert 70'	BBC Sport	Morrison 11'; Miller 49'	Stadium: Wembley Stadium; Attendance: 80,485; Referee: Felix Brych (Germany)

6 September 2013 WCQ(A)	Scotland	0 – 2	Belgium	Glasgow
20:00 BST		BBC Sport	Defour 38'; Mirallas 89'	Stadium: Hampden Park; Attendance: 36,000; Referee: Paolo Tagliavento (Italy)

10 September 2013 WCQ(A)	North Macedonia	1 – 2	Scotland	Skopje
19:30 BST	Kostovski 83'	BBC Sport	Anya 59'; Maloney 88'	Stadium: Philip II Arena; Attendance: 16,000; Referee: Fredy Fautrel (France)

15 October 2013 WCQ(A)	Scotland	2 – 0	Croatia	Glasgow
20:00	Snodgrass 28'; Naismith 73'	Report		Stadium: Hampden Park; Referee: Ovidiu Hațegan (Romania)

15 November 2013 Friendly	Scotland	0 – 0	United States	Glasgow
20:00 GMT		BBC Sport		Stadium: Hampden Park; Attendance: 21,079; Referee: Michael Oliver (England)

19 November 2013 Friendly	Norway	0 – 1	Scotland	Molde
18:00 GMT		BBC Sport	Brown 61'	Stadium: Aker Stadion; Referee: Martin Strombergsson (Sweden)

5 March 2014 Friendly	Poland	0 – 1	Scotland	Warsaw
19:45 GMT		BBC Sport	Brown 77'	Stadium: National Stadium; Referee: Alain Bieri (Switzerland)

28 May 2014 Friendly	Nigeria	2 – 2	Scotland	London
20:00 BST	Uchebo 41'; Nwofor 90'	BBC Sport	Mulgrew 10'; Egwuekwe 52' (o.g.)	Stadium: Craven Cottage; Referee: Lee Probert (England)

== Women's football ==
=== League and Cup honours ===
Division	Winner
2013 Scottish Women's Premier League	Glasgow City
SWFL First Division	Queen's Park
SWFL Second Division North	Aberdeen Reserves
SWFL Second Division West/South West	Claremont
SWFL Second Division East/Central	Jeanfield Swifts
SWFL Second Division South East	Hibernian Development

Competition	Winner	Score	Runner-up	Match report
2013 Scottish Women's Cup	Glasgow City	1 – 0	Hibernian	BBC Sport
2013 Scottish Women's Premier League Cup	Glasgow City	5 – 0	Spartans	BBC Sport
SWFL First Division Cup	Inverness City	6 – 0	Dunfermline Athletic	Dunfermline Press
SWFL Second Division Cup	Hibernian Development	5 – 0	Viewfield Rovers	Scottish FA

=== Scottish Women's Premier League ===
Pos	Team	Pld	W	D	L	GF	GA	GD	Pts	Qualification or relegation
1	Glasgow City (C, Q)	21	20	1	0	110	7	+103	61	2014–15 Champions League
2	Hibernian	21	13	2	6	86	35	+51	41	
3	Celtic	21	11	3	7	44	32	+12	36	
4	Spartans	21	11	2	8	50	53	−3	35	
5	Rangers	21	10	3	8	55	35	+20	33	
6	Aberdeen	21	8	1	12	29	55	−26	25	
7	Hamilton Academical	21	13	2	6	70	43	+27	41	
8	Forfar Farmington	21	12	4	5	72	35	+37	40	
9	Hutchison Vale	21	5	2	14	44	75	−31	17	
10	Buchan LFC	21	4	3	14	37	79	−42	15	
11	Falkirk (R)	21	4	0	17	31	86	−55	12	Relegation to SWFL First Division
12	Kilwinning SC Ladies (R)	21	3	1	17	23	116	−93	10	Relegation to SWFL First Division

Source: Scottish Women's FA
Rules for classification: 1) Points; 2) Goal difference; 3) Number of goals scored
(C) Champions; (Q) Qualified for the phase indicated; (R) Relegated

=== Scotland women's national team ===
21 August 2013 Challenge match	Serbia	1–1	Scotland	Stara Pazova
15:00 (BST)	Danka Podovac 29'	Report	Lana Clelland 90'	Stadium: FA of Serbia Sports Centre

22 September 2013 Group 4	Faroe Islands	2–7	Scotland	Tórshavn
18:15	Heidi Sevdal 82', 83'	Summary	Corsie 7'; Evans 14'; Ross 20', 29'; Ross 21'; Lappin 62'; Malone 75'	Stadium: Tórsvøllur; Referee: (Portugal) Sandra Braz Bastos

26 September 2013 Group 4	Scotland	7–0	Bosnia and Herzegovina	Motherwell
19:35	Evans 8' (yellow card) 85'; Ross 13'; Little 36'; Corsie 48'; Ross 55'; Beattie 65'; Lappin 90+1'	Summary	Milena Nikolić (yellow card) 68'; Iris Kadrić (yellow card) 90'	Stadium: Fir Park; Referee: (Turkey) Dilan Gökçek

26 October 2013 Group 4	Scotland	2–0	Northern Ireland	Motherwell
17:30	Ross 3'; Ross (yellow card) 31'; Beattie 78'	Summary	McFadden (yellow card) 37'	Stadium: Fir Park; Referee: (Romania) Cristina Dorcioman

31 October 2013 Group 4	Poland	0–4	Scotland	Grodzisk Wielkopolski
11:00	Pajor (yellow card) 63' (yellow-red card); Gawrońska (yellow card) 78'	Summary	Ross 23', 42', 46'; Corsie (yellow card) 31'; Love 65'	Stadium: Stadion Dyskobolii Grodzisk Wielkopolski; Attendance: 3,482; Referee: (Italy) Carina Vitulano

12 December 2013 Brasília tournament	Canada	2–0	Scotland	Brasília
21:45 (GMT)	Leon 6'; Sinclair 59'	Scottish FA		Stadium: Estádio Nacional Mané Garrincha

15 December 2013 Brasília tournament	Brazil	3–1	Scotland	Brasília
18:00 (GMT)	Marta 26'; Debinha 35', 48'	Scottish FA	75' Hayley Lauder	Stadium: Estádio Nacional Mané Garrincha

18 December 2013 Brasília tournament	Chile	4–3	Scotland	Brasília
21:30 (GMT)	Rojas 20'; Lara 57'; Araya 72'; Saez 76'	Scottish FA	23' Ross; 40' Murray; 82' Crilly	Stadium: Estádio Nacional Mané Garrincha

22 December 2013 Brasília tournament	Canada	1–0	Scotland	Brasília
15:45 (GMT)	Schmidt 83'			Stadium: Estádio Nacional Mané Garrincha

13 February 2014 Challenge match	Finland	3–1	Scotland	Eerikkilä
16:00	Talonen 18'; Kukkonen 85'; Engman 87'	Finland FA	62' Little	Stadium: Eerikkilän Urheiluopisto; Referee: Kirsi Heikkinen (Finland)

5 March 2014 Cyprus Cup Group B	France	1–1	Scotland	Larnaca
17:30	Beattie 68' (own goal)	Report	8' Ross	Stadium: GSZ Stadium; Referee: Frida Nielsen (Denmark)

7 March 2014 Cyprus Cup Group B	Scotland	4–3	Netherlands	Nicosia
14:30	Evans 16', 18', 34'; Beattie 55'	Report	43' Pieete; 44' Martens; 70' Melis	Stadium: GSP Stadium; Referee: Esther Staubli (Switzerland)

10 March 2014 Cyprus Cup Group B	Australia	2–4	Scotland	Larnaca
17:30	Heyman 64', 74'	Report	13' Evans; 30', 31', 70' Ross	Stadium: GSZ Stadium; Referee: Jenny Palmqvist (Sweden)

12 March 2014 Third place match	Scotland	1–1 (1–3 p)	South Korea	Larnaca
14:30	Little 87'		64' Yoo	Stadium: GSZ Stadium

5 April 2014 Group 4	Scotland	2–0	Poland	Motherwell
17:30	Evans 53'; Crichton 82'	UEFA		Stadium: Fir Park; Attendance: 1,551; Referee: Zuzana Kováčová (Slovakia)

10 April 2014 Group 4	Bosnia and Herzegovina	1–3	Scotland	Zenica
13:00	Kulis 19'	UEFA	62', 74', 86' Ross	Stadium: Bilino Polje; Referee: Stéphanie Frappart (France)

14 June 2014 Group 4	Scotland	1–3	Sweden	Motherwell
17:00 BST	Little 19' (pen.)	BBC Sport	Seger 11'; Asllani 27', 52'	Stadium: Fir Park; Referee: Bibiana Steinhaus (Germany)

19 June 2014 Group 4	Northern Ireland	0–2	Scotland	Belfast
19:45 BST		BBC Sport	Little 44'; Ross 77'	Stadium: Solitude

=== Glasgow City ===
2013–14 UEFA Women's Champions League

8 August 2013 Qualifying round	Glasgow City (Scotland)	7 – 0	(Croatia) ŽNK Osijek	Hengelo
18:00	Love 20', 32', 35'; Crilly 24'; Lappin 27'; Robertson 55'; Ross 60' (pen.)	Report		Stadium: Sportpark Slangenbeek; Referee: Linn Andersson (Sweden)

10 August 2013 Qualifying round	Glasgow City (Scotland)	9 – 0	(Malta) Birkirkara	Hengelo
15:00	Lappin 19'; Littlejohn 23' (pen.); Barnes 36'; Malone 42'; Crilly 60', 69', 90+4'; Dalziel 84'; Ross 87'	Report		Stadium: Sportpark Slangenbeek; Referee: Ivana Vlaić (Bosnia and Herzegovina)

13 August 2013 Qualifying round	FC Twente (Netherlands)	0 – 2	(Scotland) Glasgow City	Enschede
16:00		Report	39' Corsie; 90+1' Crilly	Stadium: De Grolsch Veste; Referee: Linn Andersson (Sweden)

9 October 2013 Round of 32	Standard Liège (Belgium)	2 – 2	(Scotland) Glasgow City	Liège
19:00	Lewerissa 27'; Wullaert 50'	Report	44', 66' Lappin	Stadium: Stade Maurice Dufrasne; Attendance: 2,293; Referee: Olga Zadinová (Czech Republic)

17 October 2013 Round of 32	Glasgow City (Scotland)	3 – 1 (5 – 3 agg.)	(Belgium) Standard Liège	Glasgow
19:00	Malone 15'; O'Sullivan 30'; Crilly 56'	Report	Wullaert 90+2'	Stadium: Petershill Park; Referee: Monika Mularczyk (Poland)

9 November 2013 Round of 16	Arsenal (England)	3 – 0	(Scotland) Glasgow City	Borehamwood
14:00	Houghton 14'; Carter 43'; Chapman (yellow card) 47'; McSorley 63' (own goal)	Report	McSorley (yellow card) 60'	Stadium: Meadow Park; Referee: (Romania) Teodora Albon

13 November 2013 Round of 16	Glasgow City (Scotland)	2 – 3 (2 – 6 agg.)	(England) Arsenal	Glasgow
20:00	Lappin 2'; Corsie 79'	Report	Yankey 12'; Nobbs 69'; Scott 90+3'	Stadium: Petershill Park; Attendance: 1,300; Referee: Pernilla Larsson (Sweden)

== Deaths ==
- 1 July: Eddie Moran, 82, Leicester City, Stockport County, Rochdale and Crewe Alexandra forward.
- 17 July: Davie White, 80, Clyde wing half; Clyde, Rangers and Dundee manager.
- 22 July: Lawrie Reilly, 84, Hibernian and Scotland player; member of the Famous Five forward line.
- 1 August: Colin McAdam, 61, Dumbarton, Partick Thistle, Rangers and Hearts player.
- 14 August: Johnny Hamilton, 78, Hearts and Berwick Rangers winger.
- 16 August: John Ryden, 82, Alloa Athletic and Tottenham Hotspur centre half.
- 20 August: Fred Martin, 84, Aberdeen and Scotland goalkeeper.
- 24 August: Gerry Baker, 75, Hibernian, Motherwell and St Mirren forward.
- 10 October: Norrie Martin, 74, Rangers goalkeeper.
- 18 October: Charlie Dickson, 79, Dunfermline Athletic forward.
- 30 October: Dave MacFarlane, 46, Rangers and Kilmarnock midfielder.
- 6 November: Sammy Taylor, 80, Falkirk winger.
- 14 November: Jim McCluskey, 63, referee.
- 29 December: Billy Carmichael, 80, Clyde player and chairman.
- 10 January: Ian Redford, 53, Rangers and Dundee United midfielder.
- 13 January: Bobby Collins, 82, Celtic and Scotland midfielder.
- 8 February: Andy Paton, 91, Motherwell, Hamilton Academical and Scotland defender.
- 9 March: John Christie, 84, Ayr United goalkeeper.
- 23 March: Ashley Booth, 76, St Johnstone and East Fife defender.
- 5 April: Gordon Smith, 59, St Johnstone full-back.
- 8 April: Sandy Brown, 75, Partick Thistle and Scottish League XI full-back.
- 11 April: Rolando Ugolini, 89, Celtic, Dundee United and Berwick Rangers goalkeeper.
- 16 April: Frank Kopel, 65, Dundee United and Arbroath defender.
- 24 April: Sandy Jardine, 65, Rangers, Hearts and Scotland defender.
- 24 June: David Taylor, 60, Scottish Football Association chief executive.
