= 2011 Arsenal L.F.C. season =

English women's football club season

Arsenal Ladies
2011 season
- Chairman: Peter Hill-Wood
- Manager: Laura Harvey
- Stadium: Meadow Park
- Super League: Champions
- FA Cup: Winners
- WSL Cup: Winners
- Champions League: Semi-finals
- Top goalscorer: League: Kim Little (9); All: Ellen White (16)
- Biggest win: 9–0 (vs Mašinac (H), UWCL, 14 October 2010)
- Biggest defeat: 1–3 (vs Everton (A), WSL, 31 July 2011)
Home colours	Away colours

2011 Arsenal L.F.C. season
Home colours	Away colours	Third colours

The 2011 season was Arsenal Ladies Football Club's 24th season since forming in 1987. The club participated in the first edition of the FA WSL, England's new top flight for women's football. In April, Arsenal played in the first ever WSL match, defeating Chelsea 1–0 at Imperial Fields, thanks to a goal from Gilly Flaherty, the first goal in WSL history. Arsenal won the inaugural title, and also played in the FA Women's Cup, and the FA WSL Cup, winning the former against Bristol Academy in May and the latter against Birmingham City in September. They also competed in the UEFA Women's Champions League, losing at the Semi Final stage to Lyon.

As this season bridged the gap between the Men's Team's 2010–11 and 2011–12 seasons, the team wore two different sets of kits during each half of the season.

== Squad information & statistics ==
=== First team squad ===
Squad statistics correct as of May 2018

Squad No.	Name	Date of Birth (Age)	Since	Last Contract	Signed From
Goalkeepers
1	(Republic of Ireland) Emma Byrne	14 June 1979 (aged 32)	2000		(Denmark) Fortuna Hjørring
13	(Jamaica) Becky Spencer	22 February 1991 (aged 20)	2005		(England) Arsenal Academy
31	(England) Sophie Harris	25 August 1994 (aged 17)	2010	May 2010	(England) Lincoln City
Defenders
2	(England) Steph Houghton	4 April 1988 (aged 23)	2010	August 2010	(England) Leeds Carnegie
3	(Republic of Ireland) Yvonne Tracy	27 February 1981 (aged 30)	2000		(Republic of Ireland) St Patrick's Athletic
5	(England) Gilly Flaherty	24 August 1991 (aged 20)	2006		(England) Arsenal Academy
6	(England) Faye White (c)	2 February 1978 (aged 33)	1996		(England) Three Bridges
19	(Republic of Ireland) Niamh Fahey	10 October 1987 (aged 23)	2008		(Republic of Ireland) Salthill Devon
21	(England) Lara Fay	9 August 1993 (aged 18)	2011		(England) Arsenal Academy
25	(Wales) Hayley Ladd	6 October 1993 (aged 17)	2009		(England) Arsenal Academy
Midfielders
4	(Wales) Jayne Ludlow	7 January 1979 (aged 32)	2000		(England) Southampton Saints
7	(Republic of Ireland) Ciara Grant	17 May 1978 (aged 33)	1998		(Republic of Ireland) St Patrick's Athletic
8	(England) Jordan Nobbs	8 December 1992 (aged 18)	2010	August 2010	(England) Sunderland
16	(Scotland) Kim Little	26 September 1990 (aged 21)	2008		(Scotland) Hibernian
17	(England) Katie Chapman	15 June 1982 (aged 29)	2010	November 2010	(United States) Chicago Red Stars
28	(England) Brooke Nunn	4 February 1993 (aged 18)	2011		(England) Arsenal Academy
29	(England) Laura Coombs	29 January 1991 (aged 20)	2007		(England) Arsenal Academy
30	(England) Bianca Bragg	14 January 1994 (aged 17)	2011		(England) Arsenal Academy
Forwards
9	(England) Ellen White	9 May 1989 (aged 22)	2010	July 2010	(England) Leeds Carnegie
10	(Scotland) Julie Fleeting	18 December 1980 (aged 30)	2004		(Scotland) Ross County
11	(England) Rachel Yankey	1 November 1979 (aged 31)	2005		(United States) New Jersey Wildcats
12	(England) Gemma Davison	17 April 1987 (aged 24)	2012		(United States) Sky Blue FC
14	(Scotland) Jen Beattie	13 May 1991 (aged 20)	2009		(Scotland) Celtic
15	(England) Danielle Carter	18 May 1993 (aged 18)	2009		(England) Arsenal Academy
20	(England) Lauren Bruton	22 November 1992 (aged 18)	2008		(England) Arsenal Academy

=== Appearances and goals ===
No.	Name	WSL		FA Cup		WSL Cup		UWCL		Total	
No.	Name	Apps	Goals	Apps	Goals	Apps	Goals	Apps	Goals	Apps	Goals
Goalkeepers
1	(Republic of Ireland) Emma Byrne	14	0	4	0	1	0	8	0	27	0
13	(Jamaica) Rebecca Spencer	0	0	0	0	2	0	0	0	2	0
31	(England) Sophie Harris	0	0	0	0	0	0	0	0	0	0
Defenders
2	(England) Steph Houghton	9+5	1	4	0	3	1	8	0	24+5	2
3	(Republic of Ireland) Yvonne Tracy	0+1	0	0+1	0	0	0	0+2	0	0+4	0
5	(England) Gilly Flaherty	13+1	1	4	0	3	0	5	1	25+1	2
6	(England) Faye White (c)	5+1	0	1	0	1	0	6	0	13+1	0
19	(Republic of Ireland) Niamh Fahey	12	0	2+1	0	3	0	7	0	24+1	0
21	(England) Lara Fay	0	0	0	0	0	0	0	0	0	0
25	(Wales) Hayley Ladd	0	0	0	0	0+1	0	0	0	0+1	0
Midfielders
4	(Wales) Jayne Ludlow	4+4	0	0	0	3	1	4	1	11+4	2
7	(Republic of Ireland) Ciara Grant	14	0	4	0	2+1	1	7+1	1	27+2	2
8	(England) Jordan Nobbs	9+3	1	4	0	2+1	0	5+3	1	20+7	2
16	(Scotland) Kim Little	12+1	9	4	2	3	1	7	2	26+1	14
17	(England) Katie Chapman	14	0	4	1	2+1	0	6	1	26+1	2
28	(England) Brooke Nunn	0	0	0+1	0	0	0	0	0	0+1	0
29	(England) Laura Coombs	0+1	0	0	0	0	0	0+2	0	0+3	0
30	(England) Bianca Bragg	0	0	0	0	0	0	0	0	0	0
Forwards
9	(England) Ellen White	11+3	6	4	5	3	2	7+1	3	25+4	16
10	(Scotland) Julie Fleeting	7+4	2	2	2	0	0	0+4	2	9+8	6
11	(England) Rachel Yankey	14	5	3+1	2	2+1	2	8	4	27+2	13
12	(England) Gemma Davison	0	0	0	0	0	0	4	1	4	1
14	(Scotland) Jen Beattie	6+3	1	2+1	0	0+3	2	3+4	1	11+11	4
15	(England) Danielle Carter	10+4	3	2+2	0	3	1	3+4	2	18+10	6
20	(England) Lauren Bruton	0+2	0	0+2	0	0	0	0	0	0+4	0

=== Goalscorers ===
Rank	No.	Position	Name	WSL	FA Cup	WSL Cup	UWCL	Total
1	9	FW	(England) Ellen White	6	5	2	3	16
2	16	MF	(Scotland) Kim Little	9	2	1	2	14
3	11	FW	(England) Rachel Yankey	5	2	2	4	13
4	10	FW	(Scotland) Julie Fleeting	2	2	0	2	6
4	15	FW	(England) Danielle Carter	3	0	1	2	6
6	14	FW	(Scotland) Jen Beattie	1	0	2	1	4
7	4	MF	(Wales) Jayne Ludlow	0	0	1	1	2
7	7	MF	(Republic of Ireland) Ciara Grant	0	0	1	1	2
7	8	MF	(England) Jordan Nobbs	1	0	0	1	2
7	17	MF	(England) Katie Chapman	0	1	0	1	2
7	2	DF	(England) Steph Houghton	1	0	1	0	2
7	5	DF	(England) Gilly Flaherty	1	0	0	1	2
13	12	FW	(England) Gemma Davison	0	0	0	1	1
Total				29	12	11	20	72

=== Disciplinary record ===
Rank	No.	Position	Name	WSL		FA Cup		WSL Cup		UWCL		Total	
Rank	No.	Position	Name	Booked	Sent off (straight red)	Booked	Sent off (straight red)	Booked	Sent off (straight red)	Booked	Sent off (straight red)	Booked	Sent off (straight red)
1	5	DF	(England) Gilly Flaherty	0	0	0	0	0	0	0	1	0	1
2	11	FW	(England) Rachel Yankey	1	0	0	0	0	0	1	0	2	0
2	19	DF	(Republic of Ireland) Niamh Fahey	0	0	0	0	0	0	2	0	2	0
4	10	FW	(Scotland) Julie Fleeting	1	0	0	0	0	0	0	0	1	0
4	2	DF	(England) Steph Houghton	0	0	0	0	0	0	1	0	1	0
4	12	FW	(England) Gemma Davison	0	0	0	0	0	0	1	0	1	0
4	7	MF	(Republic of Ireland) Ciara Grant	0	0	0	0	0	0	1	0	1	0
4	17	MF	(England) Katie Chapman	0	0	0	0	0	0	1	0	1	0
4	6	DF	(England) Faye White	0	0	0	0	0	0	1	0	1	0
4	9	FW	(England) Ellen White	0	0	0	0	0	0	1	0	1	0
Total				2	0	0	0	0	0	9	1	11	1

=== Clean sheets ===
Rank	No.	Name	WSL	FA Cup	WSL Cup	UWCL	Total
1	1	(Republic of Ireland) Emma Byrne	9	3	0	1	13
2	13	(Jamaica) Rebecca Spencer	0	0	1	0	1
Total			9	3	1	1	14

== Transfers, loans and other signings ==
=== Transfers in ===
Announcement date	No.	Position	Player	From club
May 2010	31	GK	(England) Sophie Harris	(England) Lincoln City
13 July 2010	9	FW	(England) Ellen White	(England) Leeds United
10 August 2010	2	DF	(England) Steph Houghton	(England) Leeds United
10 August 2010	8	MF	(England) Jordan Nobbs	(England) Sunderland
October 2010	17	MF	(England) Katie Chapman	(United States) Chicago Red Stars

=== Transfers out ===
Announcement date	No.	Position	Player	To club
2 September 2010	20	FW	(Wales) Helen Lander	(England) Chelsea
2010		FW	(Republic of Ireland) Lillie Bilson	(England) Bristol Academy
2010		DF	(England) Cally Rowell	(England) Watford
2010		FW	(Republic of Ireland) Ruesha Littlejohn	(Scotland) Glasgow City
2010	21	FW	(England) Lara Fay	(England) Chelsea
2010	23	MF	(England) Abbie Prosser	(England) Barnet
2010	27	MF	(England) Naomi Cole	(England) Chelsea
January 2011		GK	(England) Sarah Quantrill	(England) Chelsea
1 February 2011	12	FW	(England) Gemma Davison	(United States) Western New York Flash
2011	29	MF	(England) Laura Coombs	(England) Chelsea
2011		DF	(England) Rachel Pitman	(United States) DePaul Blue Demons

=== Loans out ===
Announcement date	No.	Position	Player	To club
2010	13	GK	(Jamaica) Rebecca Spencer	Gillingham
2011	29	MF	(England) Laura Coombs	(United States) Los Angeles Strikers

== Club ==
=== Kit (2010-11) ===
Supplier: Nike / Sponsor: Fly Emirates

Home	Away	Goalkeeper 1	Goalkeeper 2	Goalkeeper 3	Goalkeeper 4

=== Kit information ===
Nike released a new set of kits for the 2010–11 season.

- Home: After the controversial home kit of the last two seasons which ditched Arsenal's iconic white sleeves, the club returned to their traditional design. The kit was inspired by the home kits used in 1970s, which featured a white round neck collar.
- Away: Arsenal's away kit combined the club's traditional yellow away colour with maroon, a shade similar to the club's original kits. The kit featured maroon pinstripes and V-neck with maroon shorts and hooped socks.
- Keeper: Arsenal goalkeepers wore four different kits throughout the season. The most conspicuous feature of the kits were the black zig-zags on the arms, based on the template Nike used in 2010 for its main clubs. The primary kit was grey, while the alternatives were black, turquoise and pink.

==== Kit usage (2010-11) ====
Kit	Combination	Usage	
Home	Red body; White sleeves; White shorts; White socks.	WSL	Chelsea (A); Bristol Academy (H); Birmingham City (H); Bristol Academy (A)
Home	Red body; White sleeves; White shorts; White socks.	FA Cup	Barnet (A); Bristol Academy (N)
Home	Red body; White sleeves; White shorts; White socks.	UWCL	Masinac (H); Rayo Vallecano (H); Linköping (H); Linköping (A); Lyon (A); Lyon (H)
Away	Yellow body; Yellow sleeves; Maroon shorts; Yellow socks	WSL	Lincoln (A); Doncaster Rovers Belles (A)
Away	Yellow body; Yellow sleeves; Maroon shorts; Yellow socks	FA Cup	Everton (A); Sunderland (A)
Away	Yellow body; Yellow sleeves; Maroon shorts; Yellow socks	UWCL	Masinac (A); Rayo Vallecano (A)

=== Kit (2011-12) ===
Supplier: Nike / Sponsor: Fly Emirates

Home alt.	Away	Goalkeeper 1	Goalkeeper 2	Goalkeeper 3

=== Kit information ===
Arsenal's home, away, third and goalkeeper outfits featured an anniversary crest to mark the club's 125th anniversary. The crest featured 15 laurel leaves on the left side of the crest to reflect the detail on the reverse of the sixpence pieces paid by 15 men to establish the Club in Woolwich in 1886. The 15 oak leaves to the right of the crest paid tribute to the founders who would meet in the local Royal Oak pub. Underneath the crest was one of the club's first recorded mottos – "Forward" – with the anniversary dates of 1886 and 2011 either side.

- Home: The home kit was based on Nike Classic 2011 template in the club's traditional red and white colours, with red trim on the arms.
- Away: The away kit was based on Nike Harlequin 2011 template. The front of the away kit was divided into two-halves in navy blue and one turquoise, inspired by some of the away kits in the 1990s which featured the same colour scheme. The diagonal design represented the gnomon (the pointer) which casts the shadow on a sundial – to commemorate the original Dial Square sundial on the site of the Arsenal munitions factory in Woolwich, where the club was founded in 1886. The back of the shirt was entirely navy blue, with one sleeve navy and the other turquoise. A stripe runs down each sleeves, broken into three parts to further represent the Dial Square sundial. The away shorts were navy blue, as were the socks
- Third: The yellow/maroon away kit from last season was retained as a third kit with 125th anniversary celebratory maroon badge.
- Keeper: The goalkeeper kits featured a stunning graphic running down from the bottom of the arms to the side of the shirt, which was part of Nike's 2011 goalkeeper template also worn by other clubs as well. The first-choice kit was mainly navy with orange detailing. The alternative kits were dark green with yellow detailing and grey with turquoise detailing, respectively.

==== Kit usage (2011-12) ====
Kit	Combination	Usage	
Home alt.	Red body; White sleeves; White shorts; Red socks.	WSL	Liverpool (H), Chelsea (H); Everton (A); Lincoln (H); Birmingham City (A); Doncaster Rovers Belles (H); Everton (H)
Home alt.	Red body; White sleeves; White shorts; Red socks.	WSL Cup	Lincoln (H); Birmingham City (N)
Away	Blue and navy body; Blue and navy sleeves; Navy shorts; Navy socks.	WSL	Liverpool (A)
Away	Blue and navy body; Blue and navy sleeves; Navy shorts; Navy socks.	WSL Cup	Liverpool (A)

== Competitions ==
=== Overall record ===
Competition	First match	Last match	Starting round	Final position	Record							
Competition	First match	Last match	Starting round	Final position	Pld	W	D	L	GF	GA	GD	Win %
FA WSL	13 April 2011	28 August 2011	Matchday 1	Winners	14	10	2	2	29	9	+20	71.43
FA Women's Cup	13 March 2011	21 May 2011	Fifth round	Winners	4	4	0	0	12	2	+10	100.00
FA WSL Cup	4 September 2011	25 September 2011	Quarter-finals	Winners	3	3	0	0	11	2	+9	100.00
UEFA Women's Champions League	22 September 2010	16 April 2011	Round of 32	Semi-finals	8	3	2	3	21	12	+9	37.50
Total					29	20	4	5	73	25	+48	68.97

Source: FA WSL

=== FA WSL ===
==== Partial league table ====
Pos	Team	Pld	W	D	L	GF	GA	GD	Pts	Qualification
1	Arsenal (C)	14	10	2	2	29	9	+20	32	Qualification for the Champions League knockout phase
2	Birmingham City	14	8	5	1	29	13	+16	29	Qualification for the Champions League knockout phase
3	Everton	14	7	4	3	19	13	+6	25	
4	Lincoln	14	6	3	5	18	16	+2	21	
5	Bristol Academy	14	4	4	6	14	20	−6	16	

Source: FA WSL results
Rules for classification: 1) Points; 2) Goal difference; 3) Number of goals scored
(C) Champions

==== Results summary ====
Overall								Home						Away					
Pld	W	D	L	GF	GA	GD	Pts	W	D	L	GF	GA	GD	W	D	L	GF	GA	GD
14	10	2	2	29	9	+20	32	6	0	1	16	2	+14	4	2	1	13	7	+6

==== Results by matchday ====
Matchday	1	2	3	4	5	6	7	8	9	10	11	12	13	14
Ground	A	H	H	A	A	A	H	H	A	H	A	H	H	A
Result	W	W	L	W	W	D	W	W	L	W	D	W	W	W
Position	1	1	2	2	2	2	2	2	2	2	2	2	1	1

Updated to match(es) played on 20 May 2018. Source: FA WSL
W = Win; D = Draw; L = Loss

==== Matches ====
13 April 2011 1	Chelsea	0–1	Arsenal	Mitcham
17:30 BST		Report	Flaherty 33'	Stadium: Imperial Fields; Attendance: 2,510; Referee: Sasa Ihringova

21 April 2011 2	Arsenal	1–0	Bristol Academy	Borehamwood
19:45 BST	Beattie 81'	Report	Culvin (yellow card) 78'	Stadium: Meadow Park; Attendance: 655; Referee: Mark Engelbertson

28 April 2011 3	Arsenal	1–2	Birmingham City	Borehamwood
19:45 BST	Yankey (yellow card) 38'; E. White 40'	Report	Weston (yellow card) 19'; Williams 64'; Carney 73'	Stadium: Meadow Park; Attendance: 789; Referee: Tim Donnellan

4 May 2011 4	Lincoln	0–2	Arsenal	Lincoln
19:30 BST		Report	Nobbs 27'; E. White 35'	Stadium: Ashby Avenue; Attendance: 581; Referee: Sasa Ihringova

7 May 2011 5	Doncaster Rovers Belles	0–3	Arsenal	Doncaster
14:00 BST		Report	E. White 7'; Little 47', 68'	Stadium: Keepmoat Stadium; Attendance: 424; Referee: Gordon Johnson

12 May 2011 6	Bristol Academy	2–2	Arsenal	Stoke Gifford
18:30 BST	McCatty 54'; Culvin (yellow card) 80'; Yorston 87'; Hoogendijk (yellow card) 90'	Report	Fleeting (yellow card) 32'; E. White 37'; Yankey 59'	Stadium: Stoke Gifford Stadium; Attendance: 1,138; Referee: Tim Robinson

24 July 2011 7	Arsenal	3–0	Liverpool	Borehamwood
14:00 BST	Fleeting 35'; Yankey 63'; Little 88'	Report		Stadium: Meadow Park; Attendance: 915; Referee: Paul Forrester

28 July 2011 8	Arsenal	3–0	Chelsea	Borehamwood
19:45 BST	Yankey 66'; Carter 73', 81'	Report	Buet (yellow card) 49'; Champ (yellow card) 75'	Stadium: Meadow Park; Attendance: 608; Referee: Ade Mead

31 July 2011 9	Everton	3–1	Arsenal	Crosby
14:00 BST	Hinnigan 39'; Kane 62'; Duggan 72'	Report	E. White 3'	Stadium: Rossett Park; Attendance: 662; Referee: Billy Smallwood

4 August 2011 10	Arsenal	4–0	Lincoln	Borehamwood
19:45 BST	Fleeting 21'; Little 39', 80'; Carter 40'	Report	Harris (yellow card) 55'	Stadium: Meadow Park; Attendance: 328; Referee: Tim Robinson

7 August 2011 11	Birmingham City	1–1	Arsenal	Tiddington
14:00 BST	Williams 26'	Report	Little 69'	Stadium: Knights Lane; Attendance: 824

14 August 2011 12	Arsenal	3–0	Doncaster Rovers Belles	Borehamwood
14:00 BST	Little 37'; E. White 77'; Houghton 90'	Report	Hamilton (yellow card) 43'	Stadium: Meadow Park; Attendance: 434

18 August 2011 13	Arsenal	1–0	Everton	Borehamwood
19:00 BST	Little 54'	Report		Stadium: Meadow Park; Referee: Sian Massey

28 August 2011 14	Liverpool	1–3	Arsenal	Skelmersdale
14:00 BST	Brusell 61'	Report	Yankey 9', 36'; Little 73' (pen.)	Stadium: Skelmersdale Ormskirk Stadium; Referee: Sarah Garratt

=== FA Women's Cup ===
13 March 2011 Fifth round	Everton	0–2	Arsenal	Crosby
13:00 GMT		Report	Yankey 57'; Chapman 74'	Stadium: Rossett Park; Attendance: 500

27 March 2011 Quarter-finals	Sunderland	2–3 (a.e.t.)	Arsenal	Hetton-le-Hole
14:00 BST	Furness 21'; Bannon 80'	Report	E. White 47', 92'; Fleeting 78'	Stadium: Hetton Centre

24 April 2011 Semi-finals	Barnet	0–5	Arsenal	Uxbridge
14:00 BST		Report	E. White 3', 43', 54'; Little 6'; Yankey 46'	Stadium: Honeycroft; Attendance: 502; Referee: Andy Mead

21 May 2011 Final	Arsenal	2–0	Bristol Academy	Coventry
15:00 BST	Little 19'; Fleeting 32'	Report		Stadium: Ricoh Arena; Attendance: 13,885; Referee: Sian Massey

=== FA WSL Cup ===
4 September 2011 Quarter-finals	Liverpool	0–4	Arsenal	Skelmersdale
14:00 BST		Report	Grant 9'; E. White 53'; Beattie 65', 89'	Stadium: Skelmersdale Ormskirk Stadium; Referee: Natalie Walker

4 August 2011 Semi-finals	Arsenal	3–1	Lincoln	Borehamwood
14:00 BST	Houghton 32'; Carter 37'; Little 80'	Report	Allen (yellow card) 37' (goal) 63'	Stadium: Meadow Park; Attendance: 328; Referee: Tim Robinson

25 September 2011 Final	Arsenal	4–1	Birmingham City	Burton upon Trent
14:00 BST	E. White 26'; Ludlow 27'; Yankey 65', 84'	Report	Williams (yellow card) 54' (yellow-red card) 90+1'; Christiansen 72'	Stadium: Pirelli Stadium; Attendance: 2,167; Referee: Sasa Ihringova

=== UEFA Women's Champions League ===
==== Knockout phase ====
===== Round of 32 =====
22 September 2010 First leg	Mašinac (Serbia)	1–3	(England) Arsenal	Niš
15:30 (CET)	Radojičić 62'; Krstić (yellow card) 71'; Trišić (yellow card) 85'	Report	Yankey 12'; Houghton (yellow card) 44'; Flaherty 86'; Carter 88'	Stadium: Mašinac Stadium; Attendance: 3,122; Referee: Betina Norman (Denmark)

14 October 2010 Second leg	Arsenal (England)	9–0 (12–1 agg.)	(Serbia) Mašinac	Borehamwood
15:00 (CET)	Yankey 19'; E. White 23'; Little 26', 42'; Davison 52'; Nobbs 55'; Sampanidis 79' (o.g.); Carter 85'; Ludlow 90+2'	Report	Kostic (yellow card) 67' (yellow-red card) 72'	Stadium: Meadow Park; Referee: Marina Mamaeva (Russia)

===== Round of 16 =====
4 November 2010 First leg	Rayo Vallecano (Spain)	2–0	(England) Arsenal	Madrid
20:00 (CET)	Natalia 1'; Bermúdez 74'; Alexandra (yellow card) 80'	Report	Davison (yellow card) 37'; Fahey (yellow card) 45'; Grant (yellow card) 90+4'	Stadium: Campo de Fútbol de Vallecas; Referee: Silvia Tea Spinelli (Italy)

11 November 2010 Second leg	Arsenal (England)	4–1 (4–3 agg.)	(Spain) Rayo Vallecano	Borehamwood
14:00 (CET)	Yankey 11'; Fleeting 61'; Grant 68'; Flaherty (red card) 82'; Chapman (yellow card) 85'; Beattie 90+1'	Report	Martinez (yellow card) 30'; Natalia (yellow card) 66'; Míriam (yellow card) 72'; Martín 78' (yellow card) 79'	Stadium: Meadow Park; Referee: Bibiana Steinhaus (Germany)

===== Quarter-finals =====
17 March 2011 First leg	Arsenal (England)	1–1	(Sweden) Linköping	Borehamwood
15:30 (CET)	E. White 66'; F. White (yellow card) 77'	Report	Sällström 16'; Fors (yellow card) 53'; Larsson (yellow card) 75'	Stadium: Meadow Park; Attendance: 286; Referee: Cristina Dorcioman (Romania)

23 March 2011 Second leg	Linköping (Sweden)	2–2 (3–3a agg.)	(England) Arsenal	Åtvidaberg
19:00 (CET)	Sällström 16'; Asllani 57'	Report	Yankey 40' (yellow card) 67'; Fahey (yellow card) 62'; Chapman 79'	Stadium: Kopparvallen; Attendance: 1,921; Referee: Esther Staubli (Switzerland)

===== Semi-finals =====
9 April 2011 First leg	Lyon (France)	2–0	(England) Arsenal	Lyon
18:00 (CET)	Schelin 2', 11'; Georges (yellow card) 79'	Report	E. White (yellow card) 52'	Stadium: Stade de Gerland; Attendance: 20,123; Referee: Gyöngyi Gaál (Hungary)

16 April 2011 Second leg	Arsenal (England)	2–3 (2–5 agg.)	(France) Lyon	Borehamwood
16:00 (CET)	Fleeting 68'; E. White 85'	Report	Le Sommer 16', 34'; Renard (yellow card) 31'; Dickenmann 45+1'; Nécib (yellow card) 87'	Stadium: Meadow Park; Attendance: 507; Referee: Christina Westrum Pedersen (Norway)

== See also ==
- List of Arsenal W.F.C. seasons
- 2010–11 in English football
- 2011–12 in English football
