= Bosniaks in Sweden =

People in Sweden who identify as Bosniaks

Bošnjaci u Švedskoj (Bosnian) Bosniaker i Sverige (Swedish)
- Ethnic flag of Bosniaks in Sweden

Total population
- No official statistics by ethnicity

Languages
- Swedish · Bosnian

Religion
- Predominantly Sunni Islam

Related ethnic groups
- Bosniaks · Bosnian diaspora

Bosniaks in Sweden (Swedish: Bosniaker i Sverige; Bosnian: Bošnjaci u Švedskoj) are people living in Sweden who identify as Bosniak. Sweden’s official population statistics do not record ethnicity, meaning that the size of the Bosniak population cannot be determined directly from official registers.

Official statistics instead provide breakdowns by variables such as country of birth and parents’ country of birth. As a result, demographic estimates commonly use persons born in Bosnia and Herzegovina, or born in Sweden to one or two parents born there, as a proxy category. This category includes individuals of all ethnic backgrounds from Bosnia and Herzegovina, not only Bosniaks.

Most Bosniaks in Sweden arrived as refugees and family members during and after the Bosnian War (1992–1995), with smaller numbers arriving through earlier labour migration and later family reunification.

== Demographics and statistics ==
Because ethnicity is not registered in Sweden’s official population statistics, there are no official figures specifically for Bosniaks. Statistics Sweden publishes population data primarily by country of birth and parents’ country of birth.

As a proxy for people with background in Bosnia and Herzegovina (all ethnic groups), Statistics Sweden reported 100,017 people living in Sweden who were either born in Bosnia and Herzegovina or born in Sweden with one or two parents born there as of 31 December 2023.

== History ==
Smaller-scale immigration from the former Socialist Federal Republic of Yugoslavia to Sweden occurred during the post-war decades through labour migration and family reunification. A substantially larger inflow followed the wars in the former Yugoslavia in the early 1990s.

During 1992–1995, Sweden received a large number of refugees from Bosnia and Herzegovina. Research based on Swedish register data has identified Bosnian refugees as one of the largest refugee groups to arrive during this period, many of whom were granted permanent residence permits in the early 1990s.

== Integration and reception ==
=== Labour market outcomes ===
Research on refugees from Bosnia and Herzegovina in Sweden generally shows a difficult initial entry into the labour market during the economic recession of the early 1990s, followed by significant improvements over time.

Studies based on longitudinal register data indicate that employment rates among Bosnian refugees increased steadily, and in later years approached those of the native-born population in core working ages.

=== Public perceptions ===
Survey-based and sociological research on attitudes toward immigrant-origin groups in Sweden has generally described relatively favourable perceptions of people originating from Bosnia and Herzegovina compared with several other refugee-origin groups, particularly in studies focusing on youth and second-generation outcomes.

Research based on Swedish register data has highlighted that refugees from Bosnia and Herzegovina who arrived in the 1990s often achieved relatively strong labour-market and educational outcomes over the long term compared with several other refugee groups.

During the European migrant crisis in 2015, Swedish national media outlets referenced earlier refugee reception from the Balkans, including Bosnia and Herzegovina, in discussions about long-term integration outcomes. In September 2015, Svenska Dagbladet published an article examining how refugees from the Balkans integrated into Swedish society, highlighting employment levels and social outcomes over time.

== Notable people ==
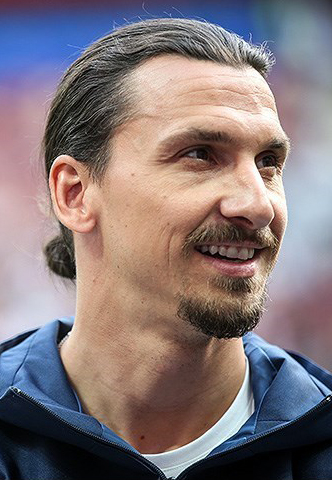
Zlatan Ibrahimović

- Anel Ahmedhodžić
- Midhat Ajanović
- Bahrudin Atajić
- Denni Avdić
- Zlatan Azinović
- Admir Bajrovic
- Dino Beganovic
- Darijan Bojanić
- Riki Cakić
- Selma Delibašić
- Negra Efendić
- Nordin Gerzić
- Armin Gigović
- Aida Hadžialić
- Dennis Hadžikadunić
- Sead Hakšabanović
- Mirza Halvadžić
- Mirza Hasanbegović
- Salvatore Ganacci
- Zlatan Ibrahimović
- Anna Ibrisagic
- Dino Islamović
- Nermin Karić
- Dženis Kozica
- Elmin Kurbegović
- Nermina Lukac
- Adnan Marić
- Nermina Mizimovic
- Anes Mravac
- Amar Muhsin
- Amel Mujanic
- Zlatan Muslimović
- Adi Nalić
- Dino Pita
- Esad Razić
- Jasmin Sudić
- Ali Suljić
- Amir Suljić
- Benjamin Tahirović
- Emra Tahirović
- Muamer Tanković
- Denis Velić
- Zećira Mušović

== See also ==
- Bosniaks
- Bosnia and Herzegovina–Sweden relations
- Islam in Sweden
- Demographics of Sweden
- Immigration to Sweden
