= 2015 FIFA Women's World Cup qualification – UEFA Group 4 =

Football tournament group stage

The 2015 FIFA Women's World Cup qualification UEFA Group 4 was a UEFA qualifying group for the 2015 FIFA Women's World Cup. The group comprised Bosnia and Herzegovina, Faroe Islands, Northern Ireland, Poland, Scotland and Sweden.

The group winners qualified directly for the 2015 FIFA Women's World Cup. Among the seven group runners-up, the four best (determined by records against the first-, third-, fourth- and fifth-placed teams only for balance between different groups) advanced to the play-offs.

== Standings ==
Pos	Team	Pld	W	D	L	GF	GA	GD	Pts	Qualification	Sweden	Scotland	Poland	Bosnia and Herzegovina		Faroe Islands
1	Sweden	10	10	0	0	32	1	+31	30	Women's World Cup	—	2–0	2–0	3–0	3–0	5–0
2	Scotland	10	8	0	2	37	8	+29	24	Play-offs	1–3	—	2–0	7–0	2–0	9–0
3	Poland	10	5	1	4	20	14	+6	16		0–4	0–4	—	3–1	4–0	6–0
4	Bosnia and Herzegovina	10	2	3	5	7	19	−12	9		0–1	1–3	1–1	—	1–0	2–0
5	Northern Ireland	10	1	2	7	3	19	−16	5		0–4	0–2	0–3	0–0	—	3–0
6	Faroe Islands	10	0	2	8	3	41	−38	2		0–5	2–7	0–3	1–1	0–0	—

Source: UEFA
Rules for classification: Tiebreakers

== Results ==
All times are CEST (UTC+02:00) during summer and CET (UTC+01:00) during winter.

21 September 2013
17:30

Sweden	2–0	Poland
Seger 52'; Schelin 66'	Report

Swedbank Stadion, Malmö
Attendance: 6,112
Referee: Kateryna Monzul (Ukraine)
22 September 2013
18:15

Faroe Islands	2–7	Scotland
Sevdal 82', 83'	Report	Corsie 7'; Evans 14'; L. Ross 20', 29'; J. Ross 21'; Lappin 62'; Malone 75'

Tórsvøllur, Tórshavn
Attendance: 130
Referee: Sandra Bastos (Portugal)

26 September 2013
17:00

Poland	6–0	Faroe Islands
Wiśniewska 2', 27'; Balcerzak 11'; Winczo 31', 77'; Pożerska 89'	Report

Stadion Oporowska, Wrocław
Attendance: 3,874
Referee: Petra Chudá (Slovakia)
26 September 2013
20:35

Scotland	7–0	Bosnia and Herzegovina
Evans 8'; L. Ross 13'; Little 36'; Corsie 48'; J. Ross 55'; Beattie 65'; Lappin 90+1'	Report

Fir Park, Motherwell
Attendance: 1,061
Referee: Dilan Deniz Gökçek (Turkey)

26 October 2013
14:00

Bosnia and Herzegovina	0–1	Sweden
	Report	Schelin 34' (pen.)

Bilino Polje, Zenica
Attendance: 200
Referee: Olga Zadinová (Czech Republic)
26 October 2013
18:30

Scotland	2–0	Northern Ireland
J. Ross 3'; Beattie 78'	Report

Fir Park, Motherwell
Attendance: 1,580
Referee: Cristina Dorcioman (Romania)

30 October 2013
20:30

Northern Ireland	0–0	Bosnia and Herzegovina
	Report

Mourneview Park, Lurgan
Attendance: 410
Referee: Monica Larsen (Norway)
31 October 2013
11:00

Poland	0–4	Scotland
	Report	J. Ross 23', 42', 46'; Love 65'

Dyskobolia Stadium, Grodzisk Wielkopolski
Attendance: 3,482
Referee: Carina Vitulano (Italy)
31 October 2013
19:00

Sweden	5–0	Faroe Islands
Schelin 12' (pen.), 30'; Ilestedt 14'; Asllani 18'; Hjohlman 59'	Report

Gamla Ullevi, Gothenburg
Attendance: 4,411
Referee: Mihaela Gurdon Basimamović (Croatia)

23 November 2013
16:00

Northern Ireland	0–3	Poland
	Report	Pożerska 5', 29' (pen.); Szaj 88'

Mourneview Park, Lurgan
Attendance: 345
Referee: Jana Adámková (Czech Republic)

5 April 2014
18:30

Scotland	2–0	Poland
Evans 53'; Crichton 82'	Report

Fir Park, Motherwell
Attendance: 1,551
Referee: Zuzana Kováčová (Slovakia)
5 April 2014
20:00

Faroe Islands	1–1	Bosnia and Herzegovina
Klakstein 79'	Report	Hasanbegović 24'

Tórsvøllur, Tórshavn
Attendance: 200
Referee: Simona Ghisletta (Switzerland)
5 April 2014
20:30

Northern Ireland	0–4	Sweden
	Report	Asllani 8' (pen.); Schelin 18'; Lundh 84'; Nilsson 87'

Shamrock Park, Portadown
Attendance: 100
Referee: Gyöngyi Gaál (Hungary)

10 April 2014
14:00

Bosnia and Herzegovina	1–3	Scotland
M. Kuliš 19'	Report	J. Ross 62', 74', 86'

Bilino Polje, Zenica
Attendance: 100
Referee: Stéphanie Frappart (France)
10 April 2014
20:00

Faroe Islands	0–0	Northern Ireland
	Report

Tórsvøllur, Tórshavn
Attendance: 226
Referee: Gordana Kuzmanović (Serbia)

8 May 2014
18:00

Faroe Islands	0–3	Poland
	Report	Siwińska 13'; Pakulska 35' (pen.); Pajor 90'

Svangaskarð, Toftir
Attendance: 182
Referee: Floarea Ionescu (Romania)
8 May 2014
18:30

Sweden	3–0	Northern Ireland
Sjögran 12'; Seger 28'; Nilsson 74'	Report

Myresjöhus Arena, Växjö
Attendance: 4,655
Referee: Anastasia Pustovoitova (Russia)

14 June 2014
17:00

Bosnia and Herzegovina	1–0	Northern Ireland
L. Kuliš 81'	Report

Bilino Polje, Zenica
Attendance: 100
Referee: Marija Kurtes (Germany)
14 June 2014
18:00

Scotland	1–3	Sweden
Little 19' (pen.)	Report	Seger 13'; Asllani 27', 52'

Fir Park, Motherwell
Attendance: 2,150
Referee: Bibiana Steinhaus (Germany)

18 June 2014
17:00

Bosnia and Herzegovina	1–1	Poland
Mika 45+3' (o.g.)	Report	Pajor 63'

Bilino Polje, Zenica
Attendance: 40
Referee: Rhona Daly (Ireland)
19 June 2014
19:00

Faroe Islands	0–5	Sweden
	Report	Seger 11'; Schough 19'; Schelin 35', 50'; Lundh 84'

Tórsvøllur, Tórshavn
Attendance: 313
Referee: Sofia Karagiorgi (Cyprus)
19 June 2014
20:45

Northern Ireland	0–2	Scotland
	Report	Little 44'; J. Ross 77'

Solitude, Belfast
Attendance: 519
Referee: Olga Zadinová (Czech Republic)

20 August 2014
16:30

Bosnia and Herzegovina	2–0	Faroe Islands
Nikolić 46'; Spahić 66'	Report

Bilino Polje, Zenica
Attendance: 150
Referee: Tania Fernandes Morais (Luxembourg)
21 August 2014
17:00

Poland	0–4	Sweden
	Report	Schelin 8', 71'; Asllani 56'; Sembrant 89'

Stadion Kazimierza Deyny, Starogard Gdański
Attendance: 1,500
Referee: Stéphanie Frappart (France)

13 September 2014
15:30

Sweden	3–0	Bosnia and Herzegovina
Nilsson 5'; Schelin 45+2', 73'	Report

Gamla Ullevi, Gothenburg
Attendance: 6,664
Referee: Zuzana Kováčová (Slovakia)
13 September 2014
16:00

Poland	4–0	Northern Ireland
Sikora 33'; Pajor 36', 68'; Balcerzak 41'	Report

MotoArena Toruń, Toruń
Attendance: 572
Referee: Sharon Sluyts (Belgium)
13 September 2014
18:30

Scotland	9–0	Faroe Islands
Little 6'; Weir 10'; J. Ross 11', 46', 52'; Corsie 57', 70'; Crichton 59'; Beattie 90+2'	Report

Fir Park, Motherwell
Attendance: 1,292
Referee: Séverine Zinck (France)

17 September 2014
18:00

Sweden	2–0	Scotland
Sjögran 7'; Schelin 76'	Report

Gamla Ullevi, Gothenburg
Attendance: 9,104
Referee: Teodora Albon (Romania)
17 September 2014
18:30

Poland	3–1	Bosnia and Herzegovina
Pakulska 19' (pen.); Pajor 29'; Kamczyk 33'	Report	Ahmić 42'

OSiR Stadium, Włocławek
Attendance: 3,078
Referee: Amy Rayner (England)
17 September 2014
20:30

Northern Ireland	3–0	Faroe Islands
Furness 21' (pen.), 90+1'; Jacobsen 52' (o.g.)	Report

Mourneview Park, Lurgan
Attendance: 365
Referee: Lilach Asulin (Israel)

== Goalscorers ==
13 goals

- (Scotland) Jane Ross

12 goals

- (Sweden) Lotta Schelin

6 goals

- (Sweden) Kosovare Asllani

5 goals

- (Poland) Ewa Pajor

4 goals

- (Scotland) Rachel Corsie
- (Scotland) Kim Little
- (Sweden) Lina Nilsson

3 goals

- (Poland) Patrycja Pożerska
- (Scotland) Jen Beattie
- (Scotland) Lisa Evans
- (Scotland) Leanne Ross
- (Sweden) Emma Lundh
- (Sweden) Caroline Seger

2 goals

- (Faroe Islands) Heidi Sevdal
- (Northern Ireland) Rachel Furness
- (Poland) Patrycja Balcerzak
- (Poland) Natalia Pakulska
- (Poland) Agnieszka Winczo
- (Poland) Patrycja Wiśniewska
- (Scotland) Leanne Crichton
- (Scotland) Suzanne Lappin

1 goal

- (Bosnia and Herzegovina) Eldina Ahmić
- (Bosnia and Herzegovina) Melisa Hasanbegović
- (Bosnia and Herzegovina) Lidija Kuliš
- (Bosnia and Herzegovina) Monika Kuliš
- (Bosnia and Herzegovina) Milena Nikolić
- (Bosnia and Herzegovina) Alisa Spahić
- (Faroe Islands) Eyðvør Klakstein
- (Poland) Natalia Pakulska
- (Poland) Aleksandra Sikora
- (Poland) Jolanta Siwińska
- (Poland) Magdalena Szaj
- (Scotland) Joanne Love
- (Scotland) Suzanne Malone
- (Scotland) Caroline Weir
- (Sweden) Jenny Hjohlman
- (Sweden) Amanda Ilestedt
- (Sweden) Olivia Schough
- (Sweden) Caroline Seger
- (Sweden) Linda Sembrant
- (Sweden) Therese Sjögran

1 own goal

- (Faroe Islands) Elsa Jacobsen (playing against Northern Ireland)
- (Poland) Marta Mika (playing against Bosnia & Herzegovina)
