= 2011 FA WSL Cup final =

- Event: 2011 FA WSL Cup
Arsenal	Birmingham City
4	1
- Date: 25 September 2011
- Venue: Pirelli Stadium, Burton upon Trent
- Player of the Match: Rachel Yankey (Arsenal)
- Referee: Saša Ihringová
- Attendance: 2,167

The 2011 FA WSL Cup final was the first final of the FA WSL Cup, England's secondary cup competition for women's football teams and its primary league cup tournament. Arsenal beat Birmingham 4-1.

== Match ==
=== Details ===
25 September 2011
14:15 BST

Arsenal	4–1	Birmingham City
White 26'; Ludlow 27'; Yankey 70', 84'	Report	Williams 72'

Pirelli Stadium, Burton-on-Trent
Attendance: 2,167
Referee: Saša Ihringová

Arsenal

GK	1	(Republic of Ireland) Emma Byrne
LB	19	(Republic of Ireland) Niamh Fahey
LCB	5	(England) Gilly Flaherty
RCB	7	(Republic of Ireland) Ciara Grant
RB	2	(England) Steph Houghton
LCM	4	(Wales) Jayne Ludlow (c)
CDM	17	(England) Katie Chapman
RCM	16	(Scotland) Kim Little
LW	11	(England) Rachel Yankey
FW	9	(England) Ellen White	(substituted off) 87'
RW	15	(England) Danielle Carter	(substituted off) 69'
Substitutes:
GK	13	(Jamaica) Becky Spencer
DF	3	(Republic of Ireland) Yvonne Tracy
DF	25	(Wales) Hayley Ladd
MF	8	(England) Jordan Nobbs	(substituted on) 69'
FW	14	(Scotland) Jen Beattie	(substituted on) 87'
Manager:
(England) Laura Harvey

GK	1	(Republic of Ireland) Marie Hourihan
LB	LB	(England) Kerys Harrop	(yellow card) 85'
LCB	19	(England) Emily Westwood
RCB	6	(England) Laura Bassett
RB	2	(England) Chelsea Weston
LW	10	(England) Karen Carney
LCM	13	(England) Jade Moore
RCM	11	(England) Jo Potter
RW	7	(England) Dunia Susi
FW	18	(England) Jodie Taylor
FW	8	(England) Rachel Williams	(yellow card) 54' (yellow-red card) 90+1'
Substitutes:
GK	25	(England) Leanne Hall
DF		(Saint Lucia) Eartha Pond
MF	4	(England) Sally Stanton
MF	17	(England) Izzy Christiansen		(substituted on) 65'
FW	20	(England) Marie Ballard
Manager:
(England) David Parker

Player of the match
Rachel Yankey (Arsenal)

Assistant referees:
Nigel D’Arcy
Michael Evans

Fourth official:
Natalie Walker

Match rules

- 90 minutes.
- 30 minutes of extra-time if necessary.
- Penalty shoot-out if scores still level.
- Seven named substitutes.
- Maximum of three substitutions.
