= Jolanta Siwińska =

Polish footballer

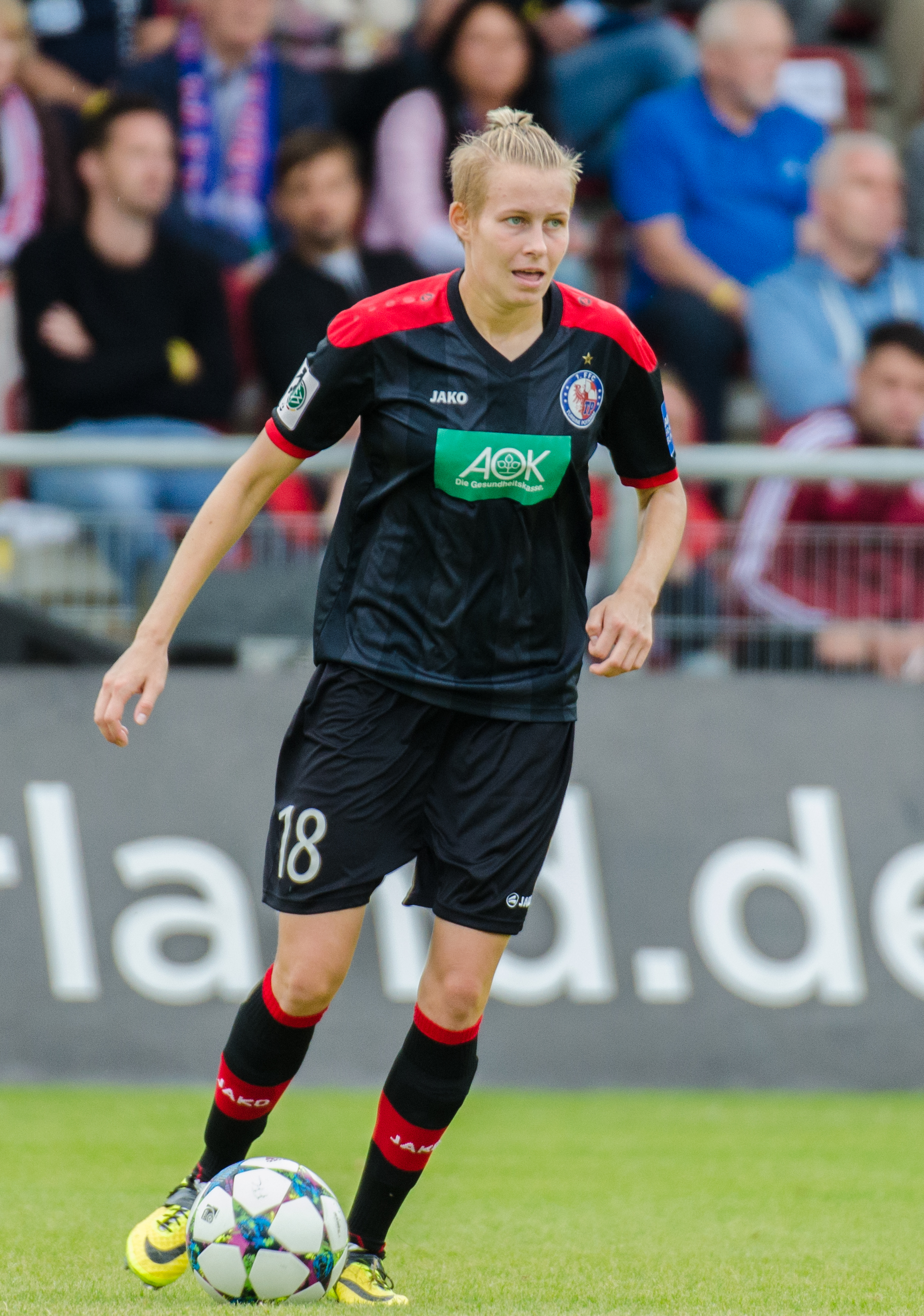
- Siwińska playing for Turbine Potsdam in 2015

Personal information
- Full name: Jolanta Siwińska
- Date of birth: 2 April 1991 (age 35)
- Place of birth: Kołobrzeg, Poland
- Height: 1.73 m (5 ft 8 in)
- Position: Defender

Team information
- Current team: Śląsk Wrocław
- Number: 41

Youth career
- Victoria Sianów

Senior career*
Years	Team	Apps	(Gls)
2009–2012	Pogoń Szczecin		
2013	Górnik Łęczna		
2013–2014	Hohen Neuendorf	21	(2)
2014–2015	1. FC Lübars	21	(4)
2015–2017	Turbine Potsdam	21	(0)
2016–2017	Turbine Potsdam II	9	(3)
2017–2018	AZS PWSZ Wałbrzych	21	(3)
2018–2022	Górnik Łęczna	32	(3)
2023–2026	AP Orlen Gdańsk	52	(3)
2026–	Śląsk Wrocław	1	(0)

International career
2009–2021	Poland	88	(2)
- * Club domestic league appearances and goals as of 09:41, 9 August 2026 (UTC)

Jolanta Siwińska (born 2 April 1991) is a Polish professional footballer who plays as a defender for Ekstraliga club Śląsk Wrocław.

== Club career ==
She played for Pogoń Szczecin and Górnik Łęczna before moving to Germany. She joined Turbine on a two-year contract from FC Lübars in July 2015.

== Career statistics ==
=== International ===
Appearances and goals by national team and year
National team	Year	Apps	Goals
Poland	2009	3	0
Poland	2010	9	0
Poland	2011	7	0
Poland	2012	7	0
Poland	2013	8	0
Poland	2014	13	2
Poland	2015	10	0
Poland	2016	12	0
Poland	2017	9	0
Poland	2018	7	0
Poland	2020	2	0
Poland	2021	1	0
Total		88	2

Scores and results list Poland's goal tally first, score column indicates score after each Siwińska goal.

List of international goals scored by Jolanta Siwińska
No.	Date	Venue	Opponent	Score	Result	Competition
1	12 February 2014	Koetschette, Luxembourg	Luxembourg	3–0	12–0	Friendly
2	8 May 2014	Svangaskarð, Toftir, Faroe Islands	Faroe Islands	1–0	3–0	2015 FIFA World Cup qualification

== Honours ==
Górnik Łęczna

- Ekstraliga: 2018–19
- Polish Cup: 2019–20
