= Patrycja Wiśniewska =

Polish footballer

Personal information
- Full name: Patrycja Wiśniewska
- Date of birth: 12 August 1987 (age 39)
- Place of birth: Poland
- Position: Forward

Youth career
- KKS Zabrze

Senior career*
Years	Team	Apps	(Gls)
2008–2014	Unia Racibórz		
2014–2023	Mitech Żywiec		

International career
2009–2015	Poland	25	(5)
- * Club domestic league appearances and goals

Patrycja Wiśniewska (born 12 August 1987) is a Polish former footballer who played as a forward.

== Career statistics ==
=== International ===
Appearances and goals by national team and year
National team	Year	Apps	Goals
Poland	2009	2	0
Poland	2013	6	3
Poland	2014	13	2
Poland	2015	4	0
Total		25	5

Scores and results list Poland's goal tally first, score column indicates score after each Wiśniewska goal.

List of international goals scored by Patrycja Wiśniewska
No.	Date	Venue	Opponent	Score	Result	Competition
1	22 June 2013	Fair Play Arena, Trzebnica, Poland	Czech Republic	4–0	4–0	Friendly
2	26 September 2013	Oporowska Stadium, Wrocław, Poland	Faroe Islands	1–0	6–0	2015 FIFA World Cup qualification
3	26 September 2013	Oporowska Stadium, Wrocław, Poland	Faroe Islands	3–0	6–0	2015 FIFA World Cup qualification
4	12 February 2014	Koetschette, Luxembourg	Luxembourg	2–0	12–0	Friendly
5	12 February 2014	Koetschette, Luxembourg	Luxembourg	7–0	12–0	Friendly

== Honours ==
Unia Racibórz

- Ekstraliga: 2008–09, 2009–10, 2010–11, 2011–12, 2012–13
- Polish Cup: 2009–10, 2010–11, 2011–12

Individual

- Ekstraliga top scorer: 2008–09
