= Eldina Ahmić =

Bosnian-Herzegovina footballer

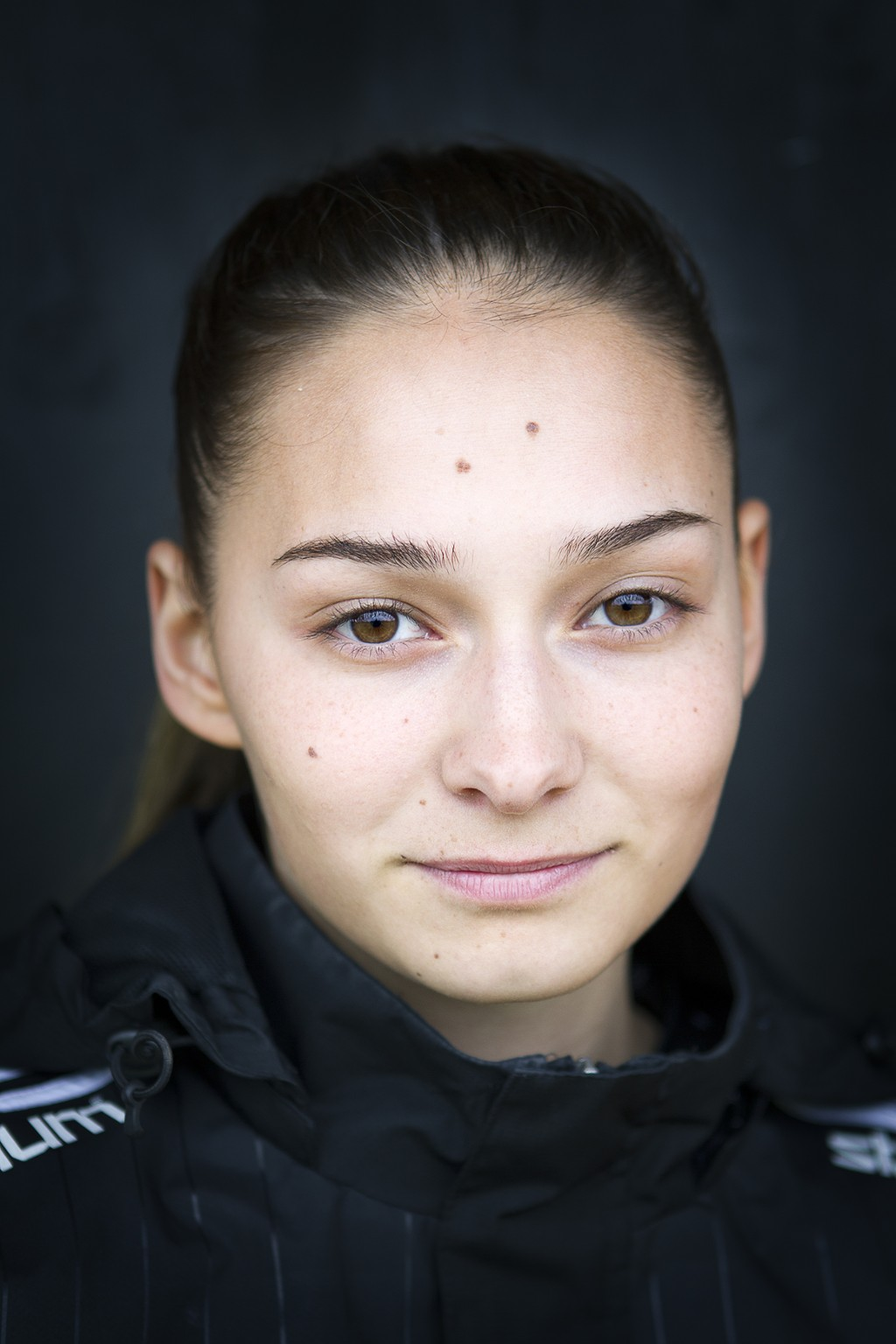
- Ahmić in 2016

Personal information
- Date of birth: 21 August 1994 (age 32)
- Place of birth: Stockholm, Sweden
- Height: 1.70 m (5 ft 7 in)
- Position: Midfielder

Team information
- Current team: IF Brommapojkarna
- Number: 10

Youth career
- Vasalund IF
- AIK

Senior career*
Years	Team	Apps	(Gls)
2013–2016	AIK	56	(6)
2017–2020	IF Brommapojkarna	75	(23)

International career^{‡}
2014–2020	Bosnia and Herzegovina	10	(1)
- * Club domestic league appearances and goals as of 17:07, 4 January 2020 (UTC) ‡ National team caps and goals as of 14:56, 3 April 2015 (UTC)

Eldina Ahmić (born 21 August 1994) is a Swedish-Bosnian former football player. She played as a midfielder for Swedish clubs AIK and IF Brommapojkarna and the Bosnia and Herzegovina national team.

== Early and personal life ==
Ahmić was born in Stockholm, Sweden on 21 August 1994. She is of Bosnian descent and chose to represent Bosnia and Herzegovina at international level.

Ahmić currently lives in London, England with her husband, fellow Swedish footballer Dejan Kulusevski who plays for the English Premier League club Tottenham Hotspur. The couple got engaged in May 2023 and got married on 15 June 2025. The couple have a daughter together named Leonie, born 25 April. The two welcomed their second daughter in March 2026.

In 2022, Ahmić and Kulusevski appeared as part of the fifth season of TV4's reality series Playmakers, a show depicting the lives of various WAGs and their athlete partners.

== Club career ==
=== AIK ===
Ahmić is a product of the Vasalund IF youth academy. She would join Damallsvenskan club AIK in 2013, making 56 appearances with the club and scoring 6 goals. She would get relegated with the team to the Elitettan in 2015.

=== IF Brommapojkarna ===
Ahmić would leave AIK and join fellow Elitettan club IF Brommapojkarna in 2017, where she would play for the rest of her club career until 2020, making 75 appearances for the club and scoring 23 goals. Ahmić would quietly retire from club football at the end of 2020.

== International career ==
Ahmić would make a total of 10 appearances for the Bosnia and Herzegovina national team across friendlies and UEFA Euro Qualifiers.
