= Emma Lundh =

Swedish footballer (born 1989)

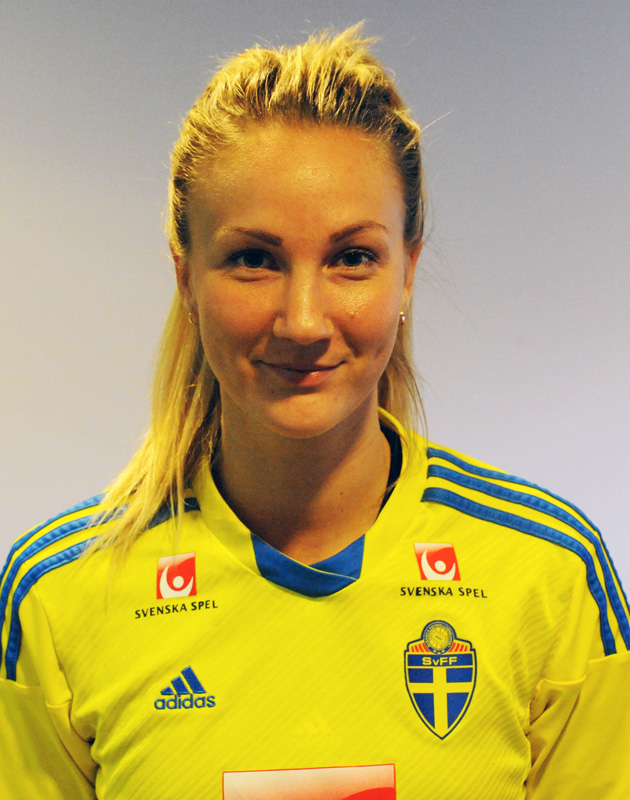

Personal information
- Full name: Emma Linnea Lund
- Date of birth: 26 June 1989 (age 37)
- Place of birth: Solna, Sweden
- Height: 1.75 m (5 ft 9 in)
- Position: Forward

Team information
- Current team: Sollentuna
- Number: 25

Youth career
- IFK Viksjö
- 2003–2005: IF Brommapojkarna

Senior career*
Years	Team	Apps	(Gls)
2006	Hammarby IF		
2007	Djurgårdens IF		
2008–2009	AIK	27	(8)
2009	→ Tyresö FF (loan)		
2010–2011	Djurgårdens IF	43	(10)
2012	Linköpings FC	17	(6)
2013–2015	AIK	42	(8)
2015	LSK Kvinner FK	5	(0)
2016	Liverpool	12	(1)
2017–2019	Vittsjö GIK	34	(2)
2019–2021	IF Brommapojkarna	42	(12)
2021–2025	Bollstanäs	54	(7)
2026–	Sollentuna FK	2	(0)

International career^{‡}
2014–2015	Sweden	11	(2)
- * Club domestic league appearances and goals as of 17:57, 4 January 2020 (UTC) ‡ National team caps and goals as of 17:57, 4 January 2020 (UTC)

Emma Linnea Lundh (born 26 June 1989) is a Swedish footballer. She plays as a forward for Swedish club Sollentuna and the former Sweden national team. Before joining England's Liverpool in 2016, Lundh had played for several teams in Sweden and for Norwegian Toppserien club LSK Kvinner FK.

== Club career ==
After beginning her football career in the boys' youth teams at IFK Viksjö, Lundh made her debut in the Damallsvenskan as a 16-year-old and moved around several clubs in quick succession. She represented Hammarby IF DFF in 2006, Djurgårdens IF Dam in 2007 and AIK in 2008. During this period Lundh was not a professional footballer and worked as a preschool teacher. Lundh left Damallsvenskan team Linköpings FC after the 2012 season, to return to AIK of the Elitettan on a one-year contract. She had left AIK three and a half years previously, to go to Tyresö FF on loan.

In January 2016 Lundh joined Liverpool from Norwegian club LSK Kvinner FK, where she had spent the second part of the 2015 season.

Lundh left Liverpool ten months into her two-year contract, returning to Sweden with Damallsvenskan club Vittsjö GIK. She was diagnosed with multiple sclerosis in February 2017, after being hampered by fatigue for several years. She continued her football career and in August 2019 agreed to return to IF Brommapojkarna, who were embroiled in a relegation battle in the Elitettan. She was rewarded with a new contract for the 2020 season when her good form helped Brommapojkarna retain their place in the division.

== International career ==
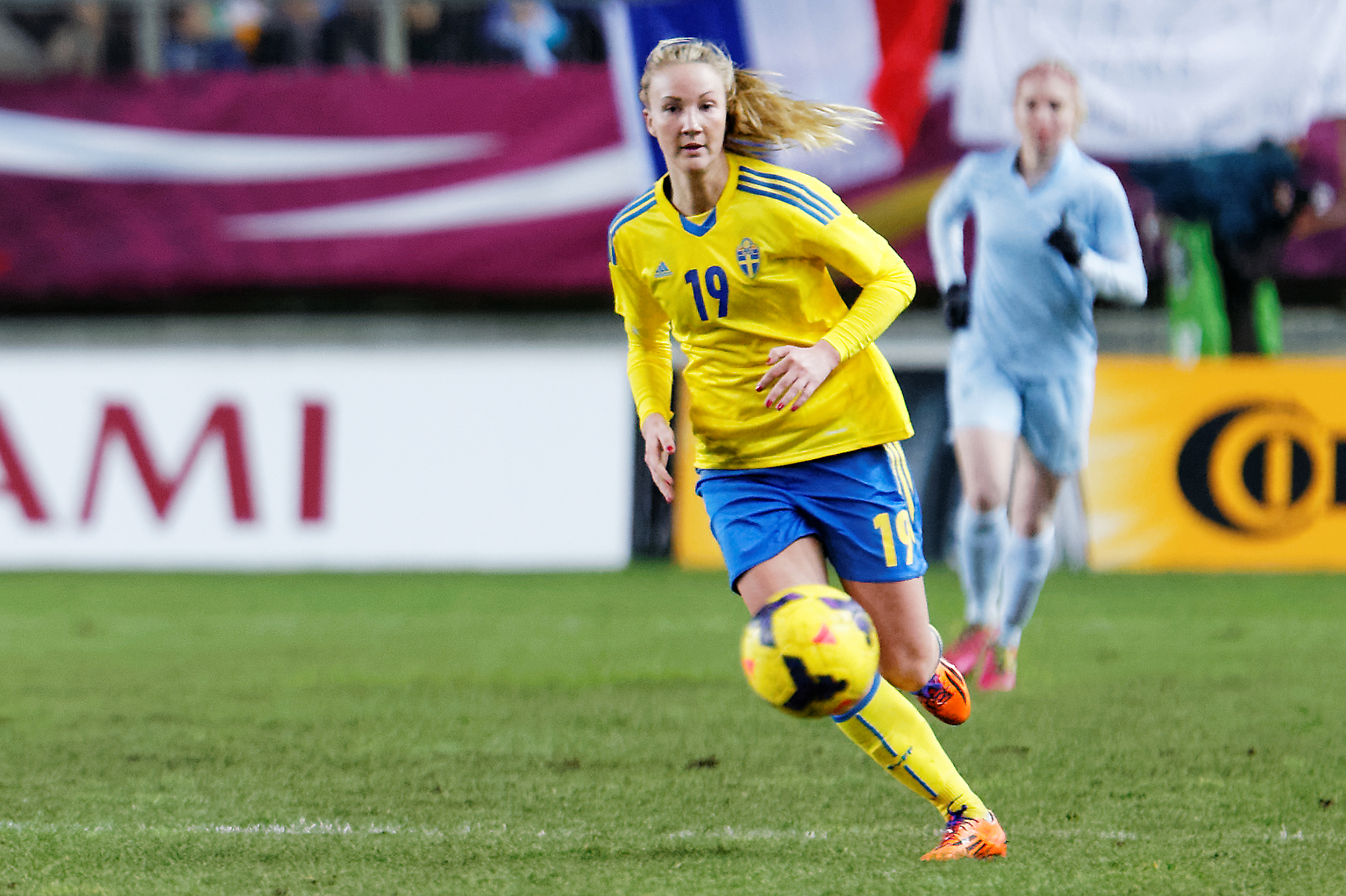
Playing for Sweden against France in 2014

Lundh played in the national youth teams, and made her debut for the senior Sweden team in a 3–0 defeat by France in Amiens on 8 February 2014. She scored her first senior international goal against Northern Ireland in a 2015 Women's World Cup qualifier at Shamrock Park, Portadown in April 2014.

In May 2015 national team coach Pia Sundhage named Lundh in the squad for the 2015 FIFA Women's World Cup in Canada.

In 2016 she was awarded silver medal in 2016 olympics
