= 2016 FA WSL Cup final =

- Event: 2016 FA WSL Cup
Manchester City	Birmingham City
1	0
- Date: 2 October 2016
- Venue: Academy Stadium, Manchester City
- Referee: Rebecca Welch
- Attendance: 4,214

The 2016 FA WSL Cup final was the sixth final of the FA WSL Cup, England's secondary cup competition for women's football teams and its primary league cup tournament. Manchester City defeated Birmingham 1-0 in extra time.

== Match ==
=== Details ===
2 October 2016
16:00 BST

Manchester City	1–0 (a.e.t.)	Birmingham City
Bronze 104'	Report

Academy Stadium, Manchester
Attendance: 4,214
Referee: Rebecca Welch

Manchester City	Birmingham City

GK	21	(Republic of Ireland) Marie Hourihan
LB	3	(England) Demi Stokes
LCB	5	(Scotland) Jen Beattie
RCB	6	(England) Steph Houghton (c)
RB	2	(England) Lucy Bronze
LCM	11	(England) Izzy Christiansen
CDM	24	(England) Keira Walsh
RCM	8	(England) Jill Scott
LW	9	(England) Toni Duggan	(substituted off) 106'
FW	16	(Scotland) Jane Ross	(substituted off) 84'
RW	17	(England) Nikita Parris	(substituted off) 65'
Substitutes:
GK	1	(England) Karen Bardsley
FW	7	(Sweden) Kosovare Asllani	(substituted on) 65'
MF	4	(Netherlands) Tessel Middag	(substituted on) 84'
MF	10	(France) Daphné Corboz	(substituted on) 106'
Manager:
(England) Nick Cushing

GK	30	(Germany) Ann-Katrin Berger
LWB	13	(Germany) Marisa Ewers
LCB	25	(Republic of Ireland) Aoife Mannion
CB	19	(England) Emily Westwood (c)
RCB	3	(England) Meaghan Sargeant
RWB	6	(England) Kerys Harrop	(yellow card) 101'
LCM	4	(England) Jess Carter
RCM	14	(England) Melissa Lawley
CAM	11	(Norway) Andrine Hegerberg		(substituted off) 91'
FW	9	(England) Kirsty Linnett		(substituted off) 75'
FW	7	(Ghana) Freda Ayisi	(yellow card) 62'	(substituted off) 106'
Substitutes:
GK	18	(England) Sophie Baggaley
DF	21	(Germany) Corina Schröder
MF	16	(England) Chloe Peplow		(substituted on) 91'
MF	2	(Germany) Isabelle Linden		(substituted on) 106'
MF	20	(England) Alex Windell
MF	12	(England) Abbey-Leigh Stringer
FW	15	(England) Charlie Wellings		(substituted on) 75'
Manager:
(England) David Parker

Player of the match

Assistant referees:

Fourth official:

Match rules

- 90 minutes.
- 30 minutes of extra-time if necessary.
- Penalty shoot-out if scores still level.
- Seven named substitutes.
- Maximum of three substitutions.
