= Selma Delibašić =

Bosnian-Swedish basketball player

Personal information
- Born: 14 April 1980 (age 46) Sarajevo, SFR Yugoslavia
- Listed height: 1.93 m (6 ft 4 in)

Career information
- College: Duquesne
- Position: Center

Career history
- 2003-2004: C.B. Femenino Orense
- 2004-2005: C.B. Femenino Cáceres
- 2005-2006: C.B. Arxil
- 2006-2008: Liomatic Umbertide
- 2008-2009: Napoli
- 2009-2010: Libertas Sporting Club Udine
- 2010-2011: Universitario de Ferrol
- 2011-2012: Pallacanestro Costone Siena
- 2012-2013: Olympia 68 Basketball
- 2013-2014: A.S.D. Pallacanestro Vigarano
- 2014-present: Fe.Ba Civitanova Marche

Selma Delibašić (born 14 April 1980 in Sarajevo) is a Bosnian-Swedish female basketball player.
