= Esad Razić =

Bosnian-born Swedish footballer

Personal information
- Full name: Esad Razić
- Date of birth: 27 July 1982 (age 44)
- Place of birth: Doboj, SFR Yugoslavia
- Height: 1.86 m (6 ft 1 in)
- Position: Midfielder

Youth career
- Tibro AIK
- IF Elfsborg

Senior career*
Years	Team	Apps	(Gls)
2000–2002	Den Bosch	15	(0)
2002–2003	Racing Ferrol	13	(1)
2003–2005	RBC Roosendaal	13	(1)
2004–2005	→ Helmond Sport (loan)	28	(5)
2005–2007	Helmond Sport	51	(3)
2007–2008	AEK Larnaca	19	(5)
2008–2009	Olympiakos Nicosia	10	(1)
2010	Rot-Weiß Oberhausen	6	(0)
2010–2011	FC Oss	4	(0)
2011–2012	Rot-Weiß Oberhausen	9	(0)
- * Club domestic league appearances and goals as of 30 June 2010

Esad Razić (born 27 July 1982) is a Bosnian-born Swedish footballer who plays as a midfielder. He is a free agent and his latest club was Rot-Weiß Oberhausen.
