= ATC '65 =

Dutch football club

- Full name: A Triginta Conditum '65
- Ground: Slangenbeek; Hengelo
- Chairman: Joop Munsterman
- Manager: John van Miert
- League: Tweede Klasse
Home colours	Away colours

ATC '65 is a football club from Hengelo, Netherlands, currently playing in the Tweede Klasse. The club won a championship in the Tweede Klasse in the 2006–07 season.

ATC stands for A Triginta Conditum, Latin for "Founded by thirty", since the club was founded by a group of 30 men.
