= Elsa Jacobsen =

Faroese footballer

Personal information
- Full name: Elsa Splidt Jacobsen
- Date of birth: March 16, 1995 (age 31)
- Place of birth: Faroe Islands
- Position: Midfielder

Team information
- Current team: Argja Bóltfelag
- Number: 9

Senior career*
| Years | Team | Apps | (Gls) |
| 2010–2012 | Argja Bóltfelag | 45 | (8) |
| 2013 | Havnar Bóltfelag | 6 | (0) |
| 2013– | Argja Bóltfelag | 32 | (4) |

International career^{‡}
| 2010–2011 | Faroe Islands U17 | 5 | (0) |
| 2011–2013 | Faroe Islands U19 | 8 | (0) |
| 2014– | Faroe Islands | 1 | (0) |
- * Club domestic league appearances and goals as of 15:17, 3 April 2015 (UTC) ‡ National team caps and goals as of 15:17, 3 April 2015 (UTC)

Elsa Jacobsen (born 16 March 1995) is a Faroese football midfielder who currently plays for Argja Bóltfelag.
