= 2011 FA WSL Cup =

Tournament details
- Country: England
- Dates: 4 September 2011 – 11 September 2011
- Teams: 8

Final positions
- Champions: Arsenal
- Runners-up: Birmingham City

Tournament statistics
- Matches played: 7
- Goals scored: 27 (3.86 per match)
- Attendance: 2,905 (415 per match)
- Top goal scorer: (England) Rachel Williams Birmingham City (5 Goals)

The 2011 FA WSL Cup was the first edition of the FA WSL's league cup competition. It was sponsored by Continental AG, who sponsored the competition from its creation, and officially known as the FA WSL Continental Tyres Cup. All eight teams of the WSL contested the competition.

The inaugural season of the competition was played as a straight knock-out tournament. Arsenal won the cup with a 4–1 victory over Birmingham. Arsenal also won the league and Women's FA Cup, thus completing a domestic treble that season.

== Bracket ==
Quarter-finals
4 September – Skelmersdale
Liverpool	0
Arsenal	4
4 September – Bristol
Bristol Academy	1
Lincoln	2
4 September – Doncaster
Doncaster Rovers Belles	0
Birmingham City	4
4 September – Morden
Chelsea	0
Everton	4

Semi-finals
11 September – Borehamwood
Arsenal	3
Lincoln	1
11 September – Stratford upon Avon
Birmingham City	2
Everton	1

Final
25 September – Burton-on-Trent
Arsenal	4
Birmingham City	1

== Quarter-finals ==
All matches were played on the 4th September 2011.

Team 1	Score	Team 2
Bristol Academy	1–2	Lincoln
Chelsea	0–4	Everton
Doncaster Rovers Belles	0–4	Birmingham City
Liverpool	0–4	Arsenal

4 September 2011

Bristol Academy	1–2	Lincoln
Fishlock 45+2'	Report	Harris 41'; Clarke 77'

Stoke Gifford Stadium, Filton
4 September 2011

Chelsea	0–4	Everton
	Report	Harries 4'; Dowie 30'; Buet 65' (o.g.); Hinnigan 69'

Imperial Fields, Mitcham
4 September 2011

Doncaster Rovers Belles	0–4	Birmingham City
	Report	Williams 16', 42', 47'; Taylor 80'

Keepmoat Stadium, Doncaster
Attendance: 198
4 September 2011

Liverpool	0–4	Arsenal
	Report	Grant 9'; White 47'; Beattie; Little 88'

Skelmersdale Ormskirk Stadium, Skelmersdale
Referee: Natalie Walker

== Semi-finals ==
All matches were played on the 11th September 2011.

Team 1	Score	Team 2
Birmingham City	2–1	Everton
Arsenal	3–1	Lincoln

11 September 2011

Birmingham City	2–1	Everton
Williams 62'; Taylor 90'	Report	Duggan 15'

Knights Lane, Tiddington
Attendance: 212
11 September 2011

Arsenal	3–1	Lincoln
Houghton 29'; Carter 36'; Little 73'	Report	Allen 63'

Meadow Park, Borehamwood
Attendance: 328

== Final ==
25 September 2011

Arsenal	4–1	Birmingham City
White 26'; Ludlow 27'; Yankey 70', 84'	Report	Williams 72'

Pirelli Stadium, Burton-on-Trent
Attendance: 2,167
Referee: Sash Ihringova

== See also ==
- 2011 FA WSL
