= Negra Efendić =

Swedish journalist and author

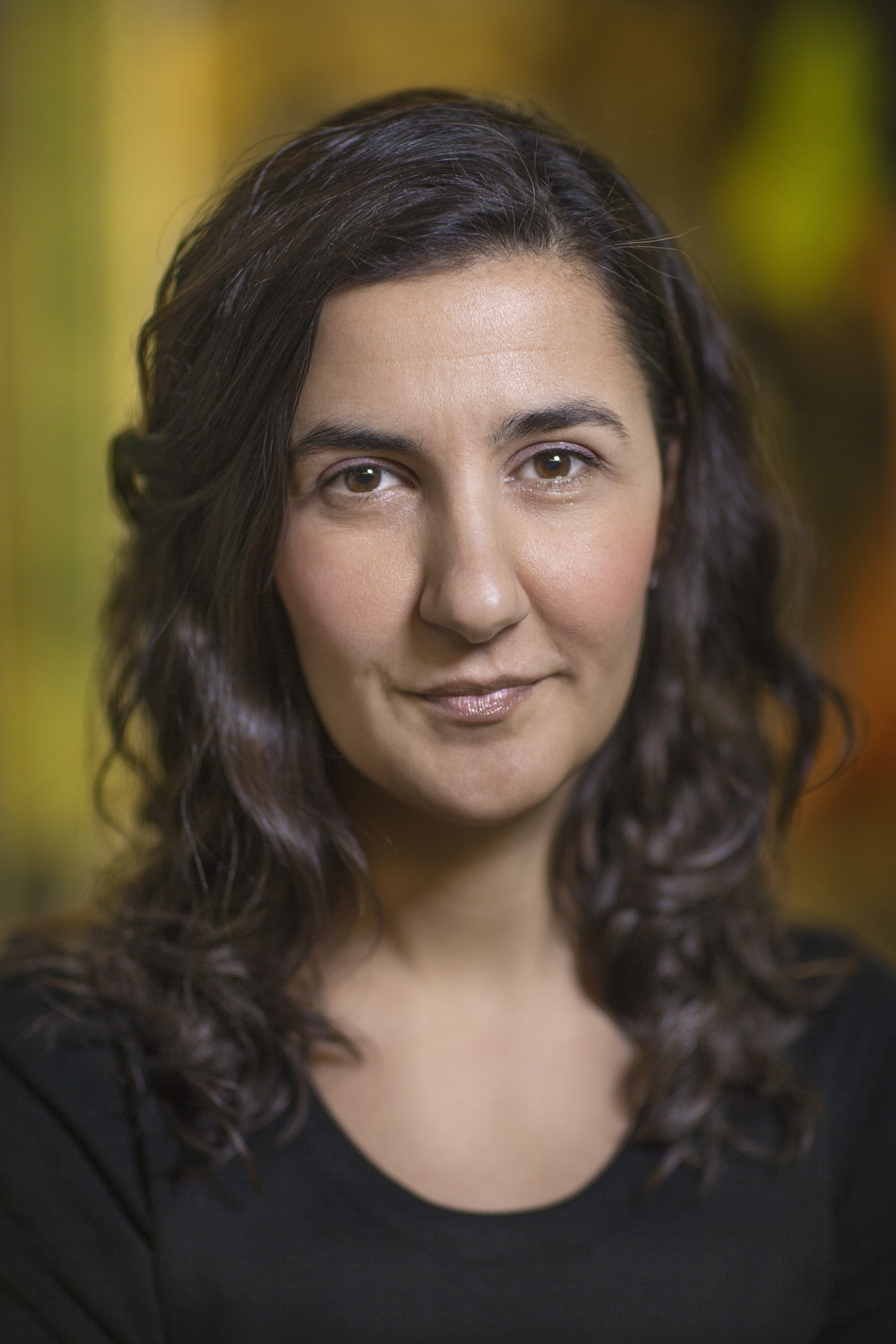
- Efendić in 2016
- Born: 29 October 1980 (age 44); Brezovo Polje, SR Bosnia and Herzegovina, SFR Yugoslavia
- Occupation(s): Author, Journalist

Negra Efendić (born 29 October 1980) is a Swedish journalist and author. She was born in Bosnia and grew up in the town of Brezovo Polje. She and her family fled the Bosnian War and came to Sweden in 1993. She studied to become a journalist at Bona folkhögskola in Motala and started working for Borås Tidning in 2006. In 2007, she started working for Svenska Dagbladet, where she now covers immigration and integration issues after covering the Swedish labor market for several years. In May 2016, Efendić published her first book, the autobiographical Jag var precis som du. The book consists of three parts: In the first part, she depicts her life in rural Brezovo Polje in the northeast part of Bosnia, near the Croatian border; The second part is about her refuge to Croatia and then Sweden, and her first years in the country; the third part takes place in present Stockholm, and depicts her life as a journalist.

For her work she won the journalist award Stora Journalistpriset in the category Storyteller of the Year.

On June 26, 2017, she was one of this year's Sommar i P1 hosts.

== Bibliography ==
- 2016 - Jag var precis som du
