= Suzanne Lappin =

Scottish footballer

Personal information
- Date of birth: 13 October 1986 (age 40)
- Place of birth: Glasgow, Scotland
- Height: 5 ft 8 in (1.73 m)
- Position: Central midfielder

Youth career
- Cumbernauld Cosmos

Senior career*
Years	Team	Apps	(Gls)
2003–2011	Glasgow City	142	(133)
2011	Liverpool Ladies	5	(0)
2011	→ Celtic (loan)		
2012	Chelsea Ladies	11	(0)
2012–2015	Glasgow City		

International career^{‡}
2007–2014	Scotland	11	(3)
- * Club domestic league appearances and goals as of 12:00, 13 October 2012 (UTC) ‡ National team caps and goals as of 12:00, 6 December 2016 (UTC)

Suzanne Lappin (born 13 October 1986) is a Scottish former international football midfielder who last played for Glasgow City in the Scottish Women's Premier League (SWPL) before retiring in 2015. She began her senior career with Glasgow City in 2003 before spending two seasons in the English FA WSL with Liverpool Ladies in 2011 and Chelsea Ladies in 2012; her time at Liverpool also included a loan spell at Celtic. Lappin re-signed with Glasgow City in 2012.

Lappin has 11 caps and 3 goals for the Scotland women's national football team. At youth level, she captained the Scotland side that qualified for the UEFA Women's Under-19 Championship for the first time.

== Club career ==
As a goal scoring central midfielder, Lappin joined Glasgow City in 2003 from Cumbernauld Cosmos U-16s. She signed for Liverpool for the inaugural season of the Football Association Women's Super League (FA WSL) in 2011. At that time, she was Glasgow City's all-time record goalscorer with 170 goals.

Lappin made her debut for Liverpool in a friendly win over Hibernian Ladies. During the WSL mid–season break, Lappin joined Celtic and scored on her debut for the Hoops in a 3–0 win over Rangers.

Lappin returned to the FA WSL with Chelsea Ladies in January 2012. She scored on her debut for the London club, in a 3–0 FA Women's Cup win over Brighton. In Chelsea's semi final victory over Arsenal, Lappin was an unused substitute. She was left out of the squad altogether for Chelsea's controversial defeat to Birmingham City in the 2012 FA Women's Cup Final.

In October 2012, Glasgow City announced that they had re–signed Lappin from Chelsea. Lappin retired in 2015 after a total of 259 appearances with Glasgow City and as their all-time leading goalscorer with 231 goals.

== International career ==
An away double-header versus England gave a 16-year-old Lappin her first taste of national youth team football. She progressed to captain Scotland's U-19 team to qualification for the UEFA Women's Under-19 Championship, but missed the final tournament due to university commitments.

According to the Scottish Football Association, Lappin made her senior Scotland debut in August 2007, coming on as a 90th-minute substitute for Joanne Love in a 3–2 friendly victory over Belgium at McDiarmid Park. Her next appearance was not until February 2011, in a 4–2 win in Wales. In April 2011 Lappin scored her first goal at international level, during a 6–2 defeat to Holland in Volendam.

=== International goals ===
Results list Scotland's goal tally first.

#	Date	Venue	Opponent	Result	Competition	Scored
1	3 Apr 2011	Kras Stadion, Volendam	Netherlands	2–6	Friendly	1
2	22 Sep 2013	Tórsvøllur, Tórshavn	Faroe Islands	7–2	2015 FIFA Women's World Cup qual.	1
3	26 Sep 2013	Fir Park, Motherwell	Bosnia and Herzegovina	7–0	2015 FIFA Women's World Cup qual.	1

== Personal life ==
Lappin has followed in the footsteps of James McGrory and Stevie Chalmers, other footballers from The Garngad.
