= Leanne Ross =

Scottish footballer (born 1981)

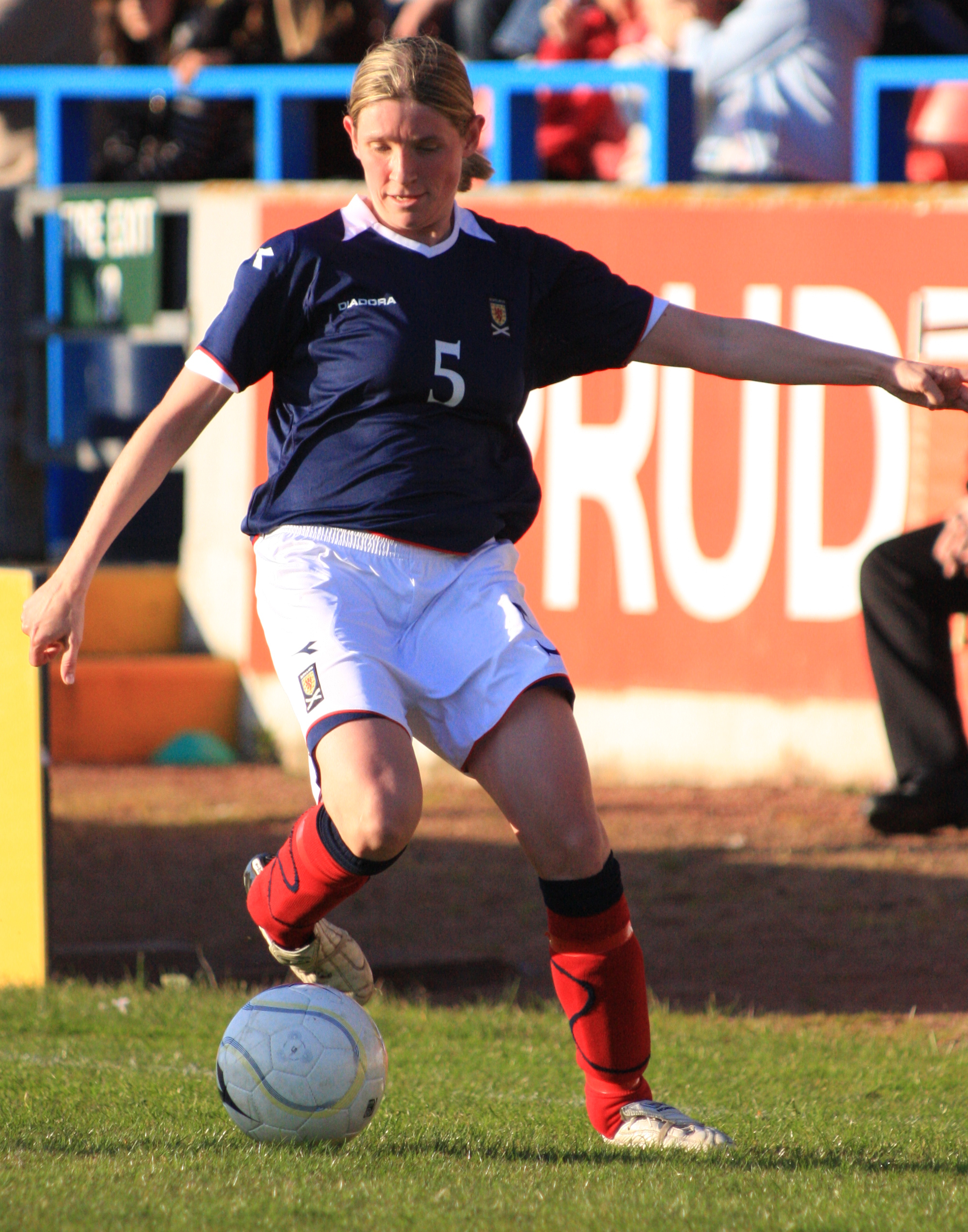

Personal information
- Date of birth: 8 July 1981 (age 45)
- Place of birth: Falkirk, Scotland
- Height: 5 ft 6 in (1.68 m)
- Position: Midfielder

Team information
- Current team: Glasgow City (head coach)

Senior career*
Years	Team	Apps	(Gls)
1996–1998	Falkirk Girls		
1998–2007	Newburgh Ladies		
2007–2021	Glasgow City		

International career^{‡}
2006–2017	Scotland	133	(9)

Managerial career
- 2021–: Glasgow City
- * Club domestic league appearances and goals as of 12:00, 26 August 2009 (UTC) ‡ National team caps and goals as of 20:16, 22 December 2017 (UTC) (UTC)

Leanne Ross (born 8 July 1981) is a Scottish former football player and current coach who is in charge of Glasgow City.

Primarily a midfielder who was also utilised in defence and attack at different stages of her career, Ross played at club level for Glasgow City between 2007 and 2021. She then moved into a coaching role at the club, being interim head coach in December 2022 after Eileen Gleeson stepped down, and being formally appointed in March 2023.

Between her debut in 2006 and her retirement from international duties in 2017, Ross amassed 133 caps for Scotland.

== Club career ==
Ross grew up in Stenhousemuir and played on boys' teams before scoring a record 56 goals in one season for Falkirk Girls at the age of 15. Prior to joining Glasgow City in 2007, Ross spent nine years with Newburgh – who later folded.

Ross won a Scottish record total of 27 domestic medals with Glasgow City (14 Scottish Women's Premier League championships, seven Scottish Women's Cups and six SWPL Cups), and also featured in the UEFA Women's Champions League.

== International career ==
Ross made two appearances for the Scotland under-19 team before a broken ankle derailed her progress at international level. After a lengthy absence, she was surprised to be drafted into the senior team – at left back – for a 1–0 World Cup qualifying win over Switzerland at McDiarmid Park in April 2006.

Ross became a national team regular and won her 50th cap against the same opposition in June 2010. She retired from international football in August 2017 at the age of 36.

=== International goals ===
Results list Scotland's goal tally first.

#	Date	Venue	Opponent	Result	Competition	Goals
1	27 Mar 2010	Mikheil Meskhi Stadium, Tbilisi, Georgia	Georgia	3–1	2011 FIFA World Cup qualifier	1
2	3 Apr 2011	Kras Stadion, Volendam, Netherlands	Netherlands	2–6	Friendly	1
3	4 Mar 2012	GSZ Stadium, Larnaca, Cyprus	Italy	1–2	2012 Cyprus Cup	1
4	1 Jun 2013	Laugardalsvöllur, Reykjavík, Iceland	Iceland	3–2	Friendly	1
6	22 Sep 2013	Tórsvøllur, Tórshavn, Faroe Islands	Faroe Islands	7–2	2015 FIFA Women's World Cup qual.	2
7	26 Sep 2013	Fir Park, Motherwell, Scotland	Bosnia and Herzegovina	7–0	2015 FIFA Women's World Cup qual.	1
8	5 Mar 2014	GSZ Stadium, Larnaca, Cyprus	France	1–1	2014 Cyprus Cup	1
9	6 Mar 2017	GSZ Stadium, Larnaca, Cyprus	Austria	3–1	2017 Cyprus Women's Cup	1

== Personal life ==
A childhood Celtic supporter, Ross was employed as an 'active schools co-ordinator' in Clackmannanshire.

== See also ==
- List of women's footballers with 100 or more caps
- Scottish FA Women's International Roll of Honour
