= Jen Beattie =

Scottish footballer (born 1991)

Jen Beattie MBE
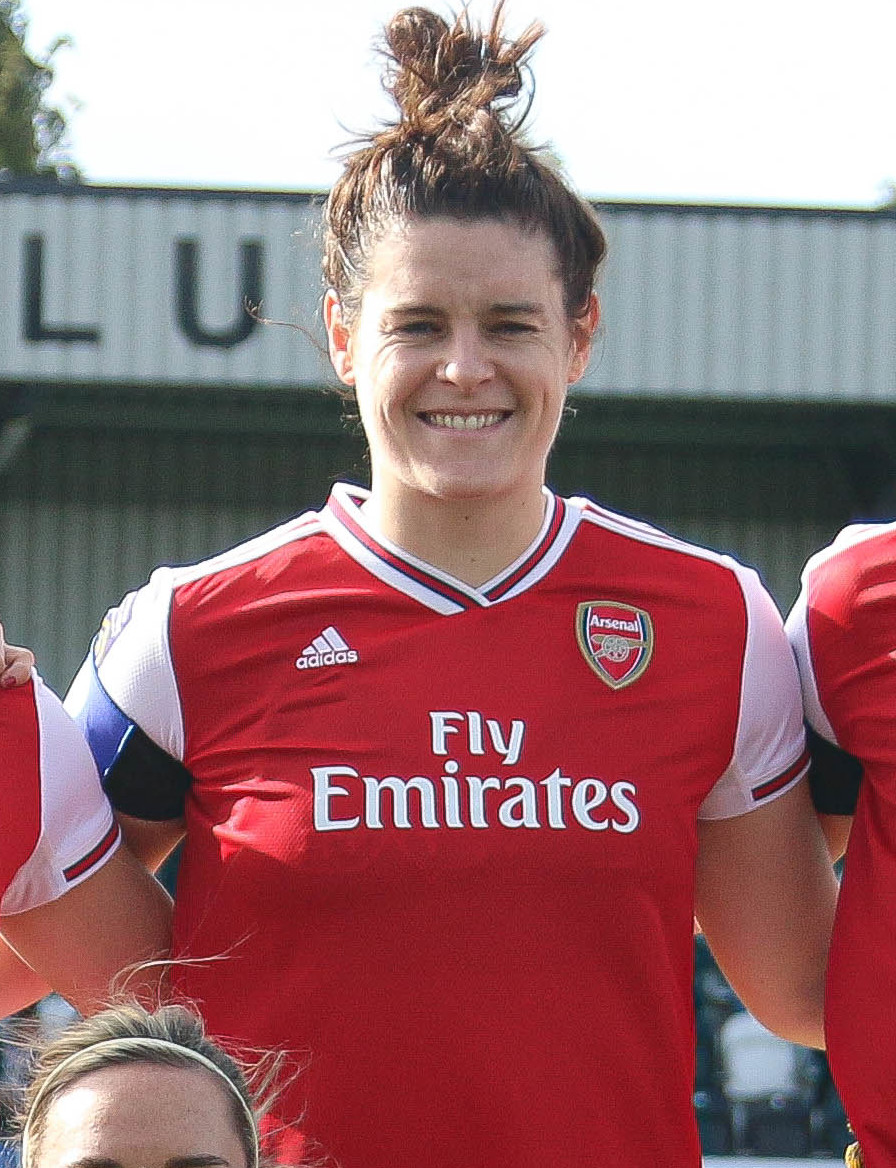
- Beattie with Arsenal in 2020

Personal information
- Full name: Jennifer Patricia Beattie
- Date of birth: 13 May 1991 (age 35)
- Place of birth: Glasgow, Scotland
- Height: 1.77 m (5 ft 10 in)

Youth career
- Hamilton Academical
- Queen's Park

Senior career*
Years	Team	Apps	(Gls)
2006–2008	Queen's Park		
2008–2009	Celtic		
2009–2013	Arsenal	43	(11)
2013–2015	Montpellier	29	(5)
2015–2019	Manchester City	68	(6)
2015–2016	→ Melbourne City (loan)	12	(2)
2019–2024	Arsenal	127	(3)
2024–2025	Bay FC	8	(0)

International career^{‡}
2007–2010	Scotland U19		
2008–2022	Scotland	143	(24)
- * Club domestic league appearances and goals as of 30 August 2024 ‡ National team caps and goals as of 27 January 2023

Jennifer Patricia Beattie MBE (born 13 May 1991) is a Scottish former professional footballer who played for Arsenal FC of the WSL and the Scotland national team.

Her other clubs include Celtic, Bay FC, Montpellier and Manchester City. Beattie is a tall, strong, right-footed player. Although typically a defender or midfielder, she is also an accomplished goalscorer. She is the daughter of former Scotland and British Lions rugby union player John Beattie.

== Early life ==
Beattie began playing football with her brother Johnnie and his friends, while at primary school. She was eventually selected to the Glasgow Primary School select team, as the only girl, and was named captain. Beattie then played with Hamilton Academical's boys' teams.

== Club career ==
=== Queen's Park ===
Beattie began her senior career in the Scottish Women's Premier League with Queen's Park FC Ladies as a 15-year-old. She helped the club reach the final of the Scottish Women's Premier League Cup in November 2007; Queen's Park lost 4–0 to a Hibernian Ladies team containing Beattie's future Arsenal teammate Kim Little.

=== Celtic ===
In January 2008 Beattie moved to Celtic Ladies. She spent a year and a half with the club before leaving to join Arsenal Ladies.

=== Arsenal ===
Beattie joined Arsenal in July 2009; her first goals for Arsenal came on 8 November 2009 where she scored a stunning treble to seal a comeback against Chelsea after being 2–0 down at half-time. In March 2010, Beattie played in attack during Arsenal's 2–0 defeat by FCR 2001 Duisburg in the quarter-final of the UEFA Women's Champions League. While at Arsenal, she won the 2009 Women's Premier League, the 2011 and 2012 FA Women's League Cup, now called the Continental Cup, and the 2011 and 2013 FA Cups.

In the 2012–13 Champions League, she scored the opening goal when Arsenal defeated Barcelona 3–0 in the round of 16 first leg at the Mini Estadi; Barcelona managed to keep the return leg at Meadow Park goalless by half time, at which point Beattie was brought on as a second-half substitute to replace forward Kelly Smith. Beattie scored the first goal in the 53rd minute and completed her hat-trick by converting a penalty in added time, with Arsenal winning 4–0.

=== Montpellier ===
Beattie left Arsenal in July 2013 to join French Division 1 Féminine side Montpellier HSC on a two-year contract. While at Montpellier, she made 25 regular season appearances with the side, scoring 5 goals in the process.

=== Manchester City ===
Beattie returned to England with Manchester City Women for the 2015 season. In November 2018, she became the fifth player to reach 100 appearances for the club. She played a role in City's victories in the 2016 FA WSL, the 2016–17 and 2018–19 editions of the Women's FA Cup, and the 2018–19 FA Women's League Cup.

==== Melbourne City (loan) ====
Beattie joined Manchester City's sister club Melbourne City during Manchester City's offseason, before the third round of the 2015–16 W-League season. While at Melbourne City, she helped the club during its double W-League and Grand Final wins, as well as their 100% record season.

=== Return to Arsenal ===
Beattie rejoined Arsenal in June 2019, subsequently winning the FA Women's Super League in 2019, and the 2023 Continental Tyres League Cup in a final against local rivals Chelsea.

=== Bay FC ===
Beattie left Arsenal in a transfer for an undisclosed fee to NWSL expansion club Bay FC on 2 February 2024, with her contract through the 2025 NWSL season with an option for 2026. Beattie retired in January 2025, before the 2025 NWSL season began.

== International career ==
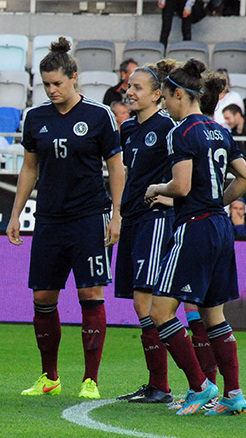
Beattie (left, #15) with Scotland teammates, 2014

Beattie represented Scotland at under-17 level, and made her debut for the under-19s at the age of 14.

Beattie made her debut for the senior Scotland side in March 2008, against the United States in Cyprus, as second-half substitute for Leanne Ross. She went on to establish herself in the national side during the 2009 European Championships qualifying campaign. She scored her first international goal as Scotland beat Portugal 4–1 in a European Championship qualifying game in May 2008. Beattie played in both legs of the qualifying play-off defeat to Russia in October and November 2008. After the first leg, Beattie and Kim Little were identified by football writer Graham Spiers as talented youngsters.

In March 2011, Beattie played as a striker and scored in Scotland's 2–0 win over England, the first time Scotland had beaten England since 1977. Beattie became a regular with the Scotland national team. While she was instrumental in helping Scotland reach its first major tournament, the 2017 UEFA Women's Euro Championship, she missed out on the tournament due to injury. She continued her contribution helping Scotland qualify for its first FIFA Women's World Cup, the 2019 tournament in France. On 15 May 2019 Beattie was named to the Scotland's 2019 Women's World Cup squad. In the group stage, she scored in the 3–3 tie with Argentina.

On 27 January 2023, Beattie announced her retirement from international football, having made 143 appearances and scoring 24 goals.

== Personal life ==
Beattie is the daughter of former Scotland and British Lions rugby union player John Beattie, and the sister of former Scottish rugby union international Johnnie Beattie. She attended Jordanhill School in Glasgow and on signing for Arsenal enrolled at Hertfordshire University.

In October 2020, Beattie was diagnosed with breast cancer. Despite this Beattie scored in Arsenal's 5–0 win over Brighton just three days after being diagnosed. She had surgery to remove the lump and, as the cancer had not spread, began radiotherapy instead of chemotherapy. Despite treatment Beattie continued to appear for both Arsenal and Scotland. Beattie won the Helen Rollason Award for 2021, in recognition of her work since the cancer diagnosis.

Beattie was appointed Member of the Order of the British Empire (MBE) in the 2023 New Year Honours for services to association football and charity. She was dating television personality and former Love Island winner Amber Gill. However, they split in November 2023 due to conflicting work schedules. Together with Rachel Yankey and Izzy Christiansen, Beattie presented a podcast on Sky Sports Football YouTube channel, 3 Players and A Podcast.

On Thanksgiving 2024, Ali Krieger confirmed that she and Jen Beattie were in a relationship.

== Career statistics ==
=== International appearances ===
Scotland statistics accurate as of match played 11 April 2023.

Year	Scotland	
Year	Apps	Goals
2008	13	3
2009	11	1
2010	12	3
2011	10	6
2012	14	4
2013	15	2
2014	15	2
2015	10	1
2016	3	0
2017	6	0
2018	10	0
2019	10	1
2020	2	0
2021	6	0
2022	7	1
Total	143	24

=== International goals ===
Scores and results list Scotland's goal tally first, score column indicates score after each Beattie goal.

List of international goals scored by Jen Beattie
No.	Date	Venue	Opponent	Score	Result	Competition
1	3 May 2008	Municipal Stadium, Póvoa de Varzim	Portugal		4–1	2009 UEFA Women's Championship qualification
2	28 September 2008	McDiarmid Park, Perth	Slovakia		6–0	2009 UEFA Women's Championship qualification
3	30 October 2008	Spartak Stadium, Nalchik	Russia		2–1	2009 UEFA Women's Championship play-off
4	24 October 2009	Yiannis Pathiakakis Stadium, Ano Liosia	Greece		1–0	2011 FIFA Women's World Cup qualification
5	27 March 2010	Mikheil Meskhi Stadium, Tbilisi	Georgia		3–1	2011 FIFA Women's World Cup qualification
6	19 June 2010	Georgi Asparuhov Stadium, Sofia	Bulgaria		5–0	2011 FIFA Women's World Cup qualification
7	21 August 2010	Strathclyde Homes Stadium, Dumbarton	Greece		4–1	2011 FIFA Women's World Cup qualification
8	4 March 2011	GSP Stadium, Nicosia	England		2–0	2011 Cyprus Cup
9	21 August 2011	Falkirk Stadium, Falkirk	Switzerland		5–0	Friendly
10	21 September 2011	Tynecastle Stadium, Edinburgh	Finland		7–2	Friendly
12	12 October 2011	Ness Ziona Stadium, Ness Ziona	Israel		6–1	2013 UEFA Women's Championship qualification
13	27 October 2011	Tynecastle Stadium, Edinburgh	Wales		2–2	2013 UEFA Women's Championship qualification
14	5 February 2012	Solitude, Belfast	Northern Ireland		5–1	Friendly
18	26 September 2013	Fir Park, Motherwell	Bosnia and Herzegovina		7–0	2015 FIFA Women's World Cup qualification
19	26 October 2013	Fir Park, Motherwell	Northern Ireland		2–0	2015 FIFA Women's World Cup qualification
20	7 March 2014	GSP Stadium, Nicosia	Netherlands		4–3	2014 Cyprus Cup
21	13 September 2014	Fir Park, Motherwell	Faroe Islands		9–0	2015 FIFA Women's World Cup qualification
22	29 November 2015	St Mirren Park, Paisley	North Macedonia		0–0	2017 UEFA Women's Championship qualification
23	19 June 2019	Parc des Princes, Paris	Argentina		3–3	2019 FIFA Women's World Cup
24	6 September 2022	Tórsvøllur, Tórshavn	Faroe Islands		6–0	2023 FIFA Women's World Cup qualification

== Honours ==
Arsenal

- FA Women's Super League: 2008–09, 2009–10, 2011, 2012
- FA Women's Cup: 2010–11, 2012–13
- FA WSL Cup / FA Women's League Cup: 2012, 2022–23

Melbourne City

- A-League Women: 2015–16

Manchester City

- FA Women's Super League: 2016
- Women's FA Cup: 2016–17, 2018–19
- FA Women's League Cup: 2016, 2018–19

Individual

- Northwest Football Awards Women's Player of the Year: 2018
- Helen Rollason Award: 2021
- Member of the Order of the British Empire
- Lauren Holiday Impact Award: 2024

== See also ==
- List of women's footballers with 100 or more international caps
- Scottish FA Women's International Roll of Honour
