= WSL Players Cup =

English women's football competition

Players Cup
- Organiser(s): WSL Football
- Founded: 2011; 15 years ago
- Region: England
- Teams: 23
- Current champions: Chelsea (4th title)
- Most championships: Arsenal (7 titles)
- Broadcaster(s): BBC Sport; Sky Sports
- 2026–27 WSL Players Cup

The Players Cup, also known as the Subway Players Cup for sponsorship reasons, is a league cup competition in English women's association football. It was previously known as the FA WSL Cup and the Women's League Cup.

The competition underwent a restructure ahead of the 2026–27 competition, adopting the Swiss-style league format which guarantees all teams play a minimum of six matches to ensure players are not game underloaded. With the new format, teams competing in the UEFA Women's Champions League or UEFA Women's Europa Cup are not participating due to their own increased load management.

Fifteen editions have been played, with Arsenal being the most successful club with seven titles.

Following a successful use of the video assistant referee (VAR) and goal-line technology in the 2023 Women's FA Cup final, they were used for the first time in the 2024 FA Women's League Cup final and have both been used in finals since.

== History ==
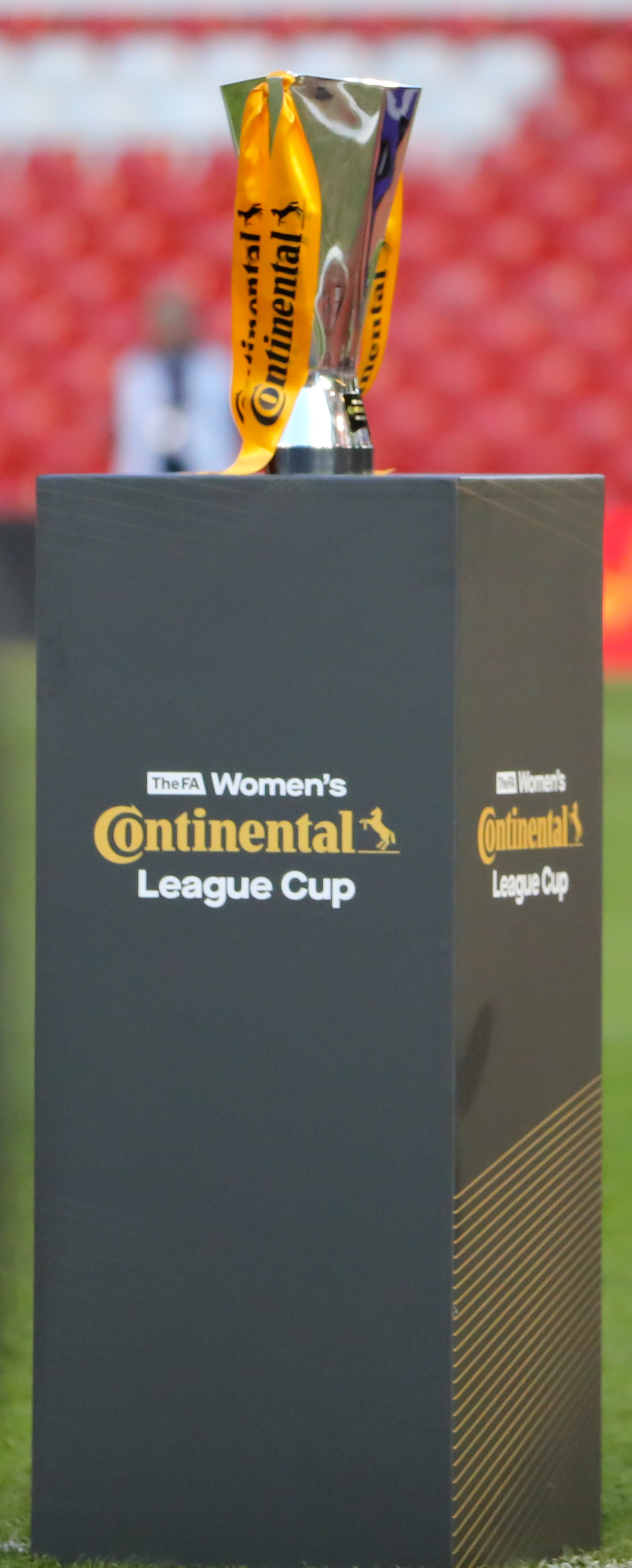
Winners trophy

Before the Women's Super League (WSL) was established, the top women's clubs competed in the FA Women's Premier League Cup.

The first League Cup edition under the WSL was played after the inaugural FA WSL season. Arsenal, having already won the WSL and the FA Women's Cup, completed the national treble after a 4–1 win over Birmingham City.

The 2012 edition saw a change of format. The straight knockout system was abolished and a group stage with two groups was established. The top two teams from each group advanced to the semi-finals.

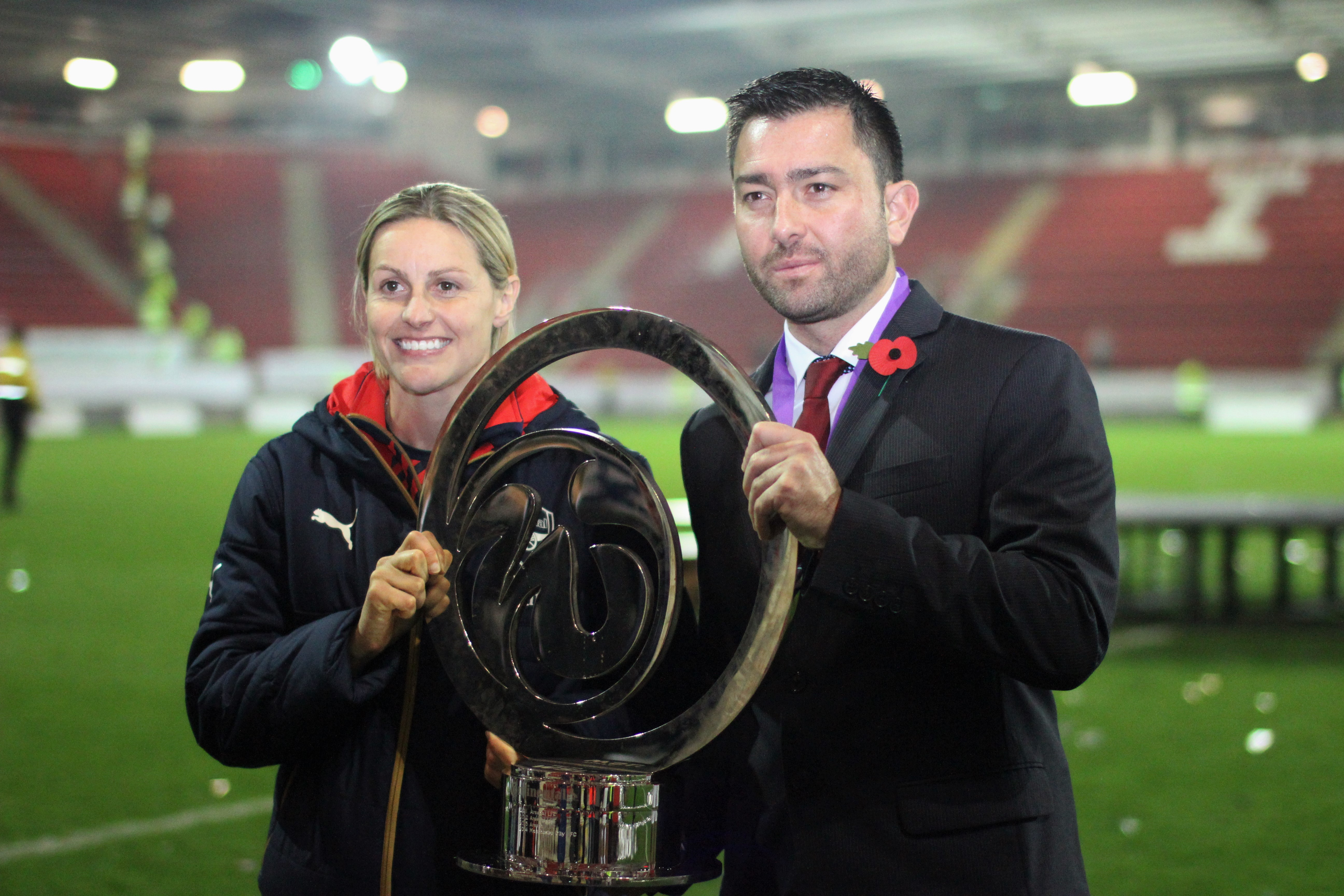
Pedro Martínez Losa and Kelly Smith with the FA WSL Cup, 2015

In 2014, 18 teams entered, and new WSL 2 teams joined the WSL teams. There were three groups of six teams. In 2015, the quarter-final stage was played for the first time.

For 2016, the cup changed to a true knockout format and abolished the group stage, a move made in agreement with the clubs to increase excitement and competitiveness. With 19 teams, the bottom six teams played a preliminary round. In the round of 16 that followed, the seeding system was used, so the WSL 1 teams met the WSL 2 teams, who had home field advantage.

In 2017–18, a group stage was added again.

In 2018–19, as part of the restructuring of women's football, 22 teams entered. The competition was split up into North and South, with each region having one group of six and one group of five. Each team would play one match against each other, with the top two in each group advancing to a quarter-final.

The format was similar in 2019–20, with an extra team in the South for a total of 23 teams.

Starting with the 2026–27 season, teams competing in the UEFA Women's Champions League have been excluded from the tournament, and the group stage format has been switched to a Swiss-style league format.

== List of finals ==
Only Arsenal, Chelsea and Manchester City have won the WSL Players Cup. Arsenal, Birmingham City and Chelsea have lost the most finals, finishing as runners-up three times.

WSL Players Cup winners
| Season | Winners | Score | Runners-up | Venue | Attendance |
|---|---|---|---|---|---|
| 2011 | Arsenal | 4–1 | Birmingham City | Pirelli Stadium, Burton upon Trent | 2,167 |
| 2012 | Arsenal | 1–0 | Birmingham City | Underhill Stadium, London | 2,535 |
| 2013 | Arsenal | 2–0 | Lincoln | The Hive, London | 3,421 |
| 2014 | Manchester City | 1–0 | Arsenal | Adams Park, High Wycombe | 3,697 |
| 2015 | Arsenal | 3–0 | Notts County | New York Stadium, Rotherham | 5,028 |
| 2016 | Manchester City | 1–0 (a.e.t.) | Birmingham City | Academy Stadium, Manchester | 4,214 |
| 2017–18 | Arsenal | 1–0 | Manchester City | Adams Park, High Wycombe | 2,136 |
| 2018–19 | Manchester City | 0–0 (4–2 p) | Arsenal | Bramall Lane, Sheffield | 2,424 |
| 2019–20 | Chelsea | 2–1 | Arsenal | City Ground, Nottingham | 6,743 |
| 2020–21 | Chelsea | 6–0 | Bristol City | Vicarage Road, Watford | 0 (Note: The 2021 final was played behind closed doors due to the COVID-19 pandemic in the United Kingdom.) |
| 2021–22 | Manchester City | 3–1 | Chelsea | Plough Lane, Wimbledon | 8,004 |
| 2022–23 | Arsenal | 3–1 | Chelsea | Selhurst Park, London | 19,010 |
| 2023–24 | Arsenal | 1–0 (a.e.t.) | Chelsea | Molineux Stadium, Wolverhampton | 21,462 |
| 2024–25 | Chelsea | 2–1 | Manchester City | Pride Park Stadium, Derby | 14,187 |
| 2025–26 | Chelsea | 2–0 | Manchester United | Ashton Gate, Bristol | 21,619 |

== Results by team ==
Teams shown in italics are no longer in existence.

Results by team
| Club | Wins | First final won | Last final won | Runners-up | Last final lost | Total final appearances |
|---|---|---|---|---|---|---|
| Arsenal | 7 | 2011 | 2024 | 3 | 2020 | 10 |
| Chelsea | 4 | 2020 | 2026 | 3 | 2024 | 7 |
| Manchester City | 4 | 2014 | 2022 | 2 | 2025 | 6 |
| Birmingham City | 0 | — | — | 3 | 2016 | 3 |
| Lincoln | 0 | — | — | 1 | 2013 | 1 |
| Notts County | 0 | — | — | 1 | 2015 | 1 |
| Bristol City | 0 | — | — | 1 | 2021 | 1 |
| Manchester United | 0 | — | — | 1 | 2026 | 1 |

== Title sponsors ==
| Period | Sponsor | Name |
|---|---|---|
| 2011–2018 | Continental AG | FA WSL Continental Tyres Cup |
| 2018–2019 | Continental AG | FA Continental Tyres League Cup |
| 2019–2024 | Continental AG | FA Women's Continental League Cup |
| 2024–2026 | Subway | Subway Women’s League Cup |
| 2026–present | Subway | Subway Players Cup |
