= Koetschette =

Town in Luxembourg

Coordinates: 49°50′N 5°50′E

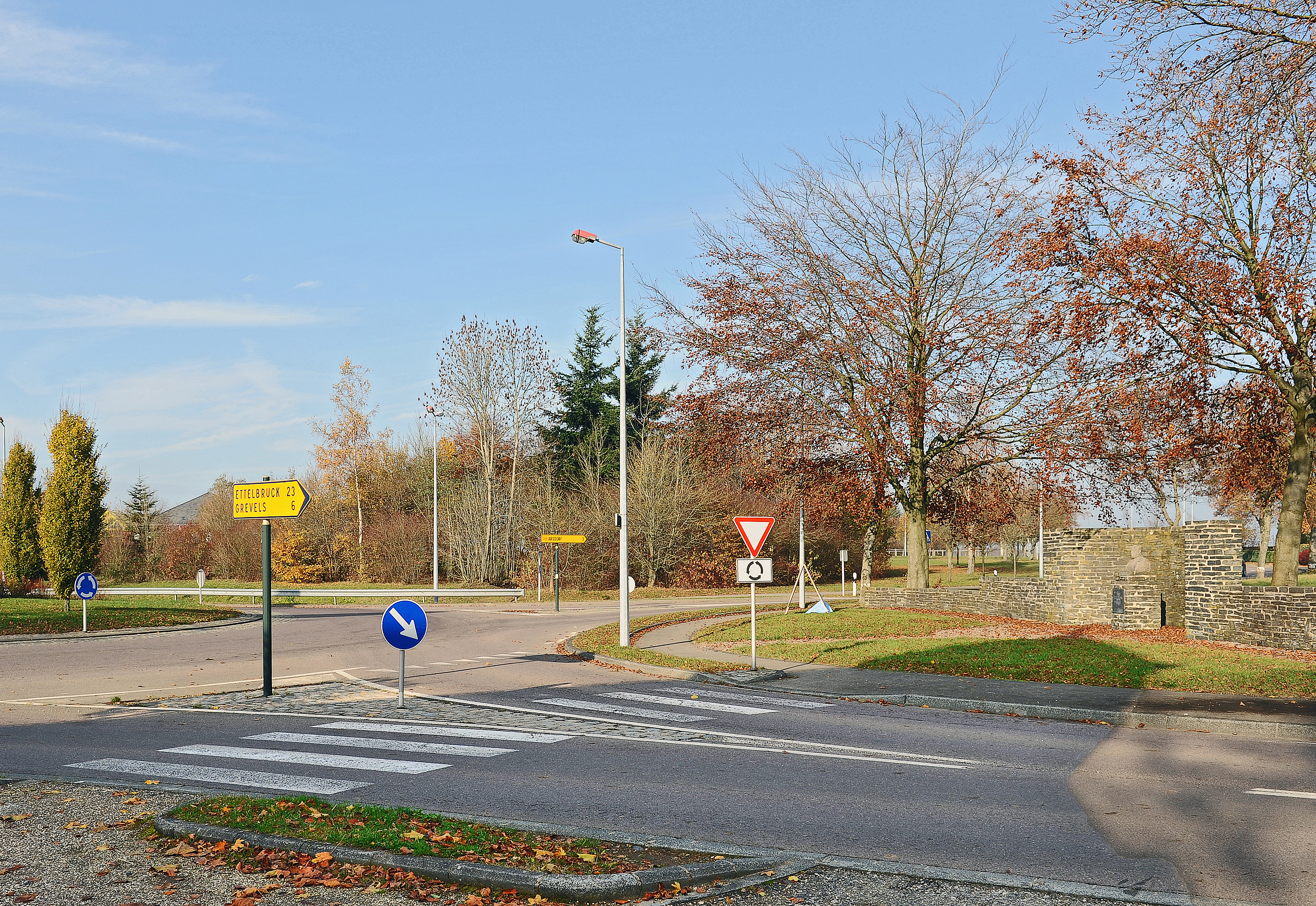
Cross-roads at Koetschette, Luxembourg. At right: Monument commemorating Etienne Schmit (1886-1937), former minister of Luxembourg.

Koetschette (Luxembourgish: Kietscht) is a small town in the commune of Rambrouch, in northwestern Luxembourg. As of September 2026, the town had a population of 188.
