= 2009 WPS All-Star Game =

- Event: Women's Professional Soccer All-Star Game
WPS All-Stars	Umeå IK
4	2
- Date: August 30, 2009
- Venue: Soccer Park; Fenton, Missouri
- Referee: Sandra Serafini
- Attendance: 4,115

The 2009 Women's Professional Soccer All-Star Game was the first WPS All-Star Game. In a format similar to that of recent all-star games in Major League Soccer, the WPS All-Stars played Swedish club powerhouse Umeå IK on August 30, 2009, eight days after the league's championship game. The WPS All-Stars defeated their guests 4–2.

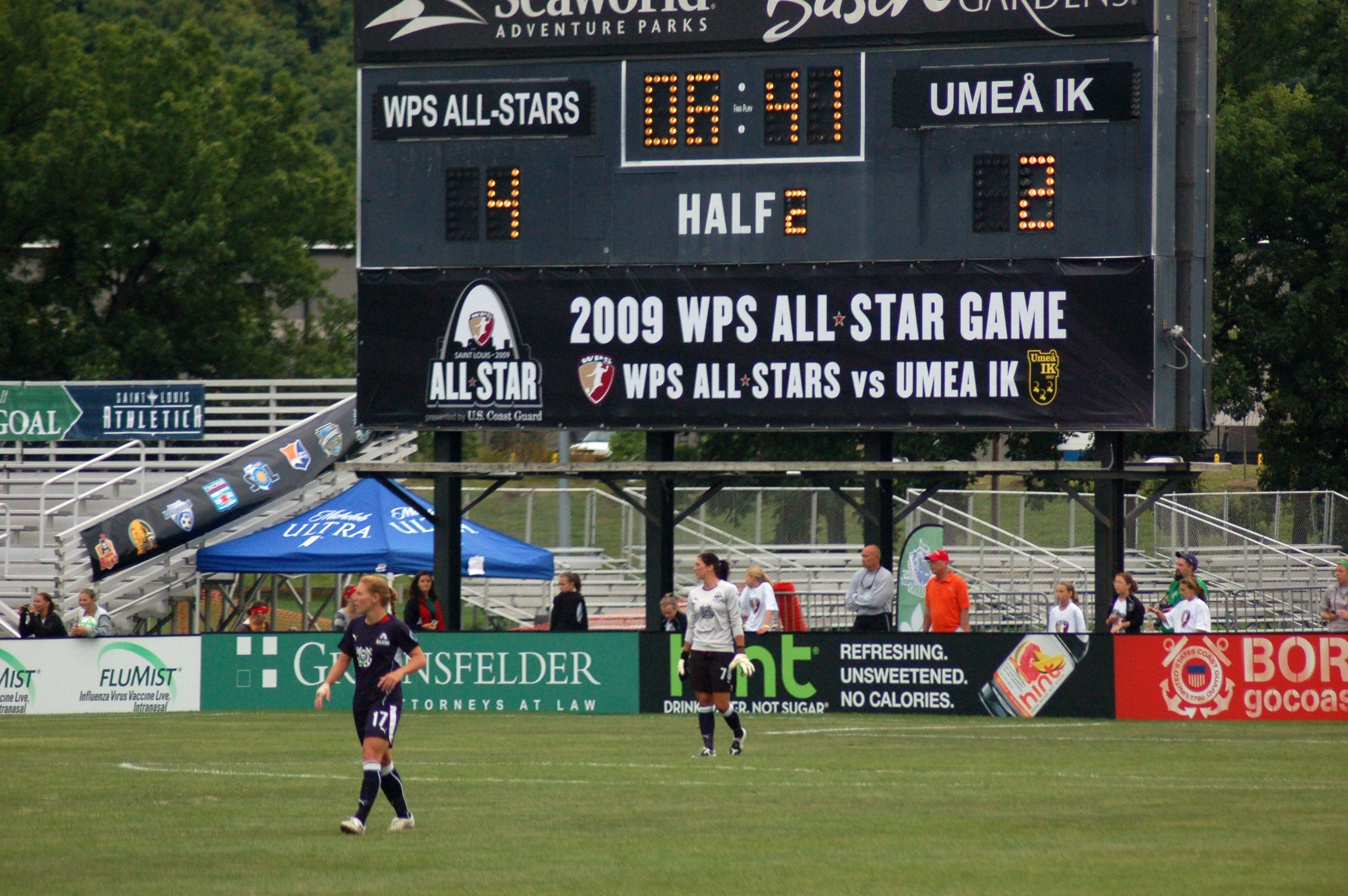
Scoreboard at the Soccer Park in Fenton MO.

== Saint Louis Athletica named host ==
WPS awarded the 2009 All-Star Game to St. Louis, Missouri in a press release on June 25, 2009. The venue was Anheuser-Busch Center in the suburb of Fenton, home of Saint Louis Athletica.

St. Louis has such a rich soccer tradition and great fans that we thought it would make for a terrific location – right in the heart of America – for our first WPS All-Star Game.

— Tonya Antonucci

== Umeå IK ==
Founded in 1917, Umeå IK is currently one of the premier women's clubs in Europe. They have won six Damallsvenskan titles, and won the UEFA Women's Champions League twice, appearing in the finals five times in the eight years since the competition's founding. Umeå was also the club that Marta played for before moving to the Los Angeles Sol.

== WPS All-Stars ==
=== Voting ===
Eleven of the eighteen WPS All-Stars were chosen by vote. 25% of the total vote came from fans voting online, 25% from media, 25% from coaches (who were prohibited from voting for their team's players), and 25% from players. The results of the voting were released on August 4 at 5PM ET.

Over 25,000 fan votes were cast, with the top three fan picks being Hope Solo, Lori Chalupny, and Shannon Boxx. Despite leading the fan voting, Solo did not make the Starting XI. Marta was the overall top vote-getter, being named on the ballots of all eligible coaches, collecting 94% of the media vote, and finishing second in the player vote and fourth in the fan vote.

Multiple players who were selected to the Starting XI were playing for their national teams in the UEFA Women's Euro 2009 at the time of the All-Star game. As such, their spots on the field were taken by the next runners-up in the voting for their respective positions.

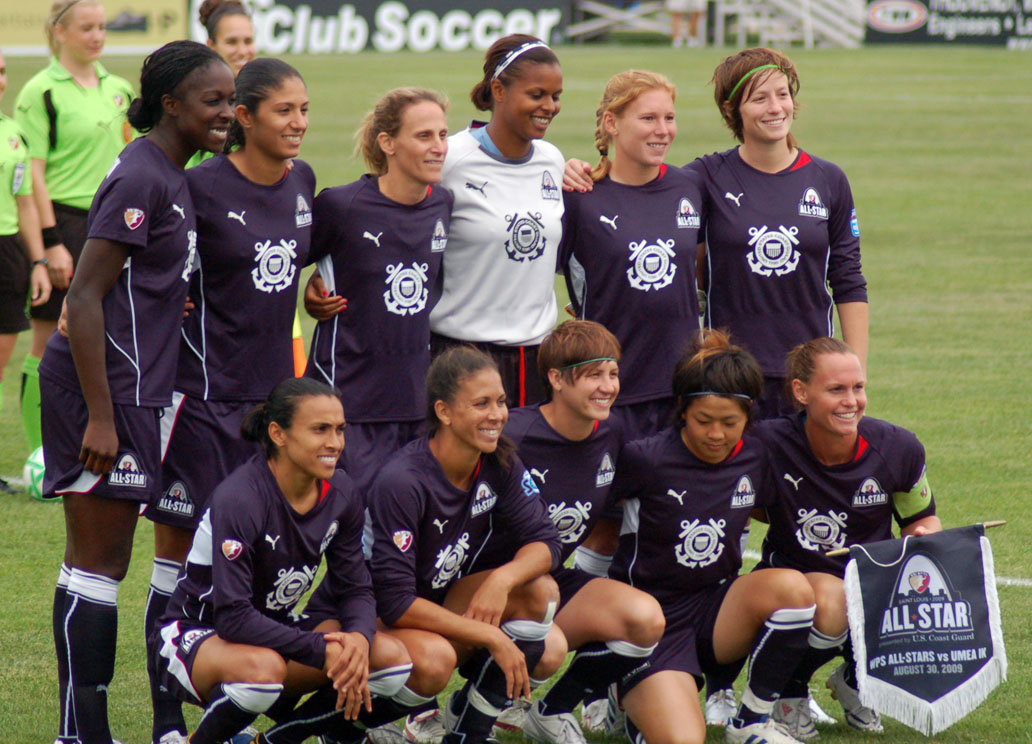
The starting line-up of the 2009 WPS All-Stars.

=== At-Large Selections ===
The remaining seven players on the All-Star team were selected by Abner Rogers (head coach for the Los Angeles Sol), who was chosen by a vote of all WPS players to be the WPS All-Star coach, and Commissioner Tonya Antonucci.

== 2009 All-Star Rosters ==
=== Women's Professional Soccer ===
Note: Flags indicate national team as defined under FIFA eligibility rules; some limited exceptions apply. Players may hold more than one non-FIFA nationality.

No.	Pos.	Nation	Player
3	DF	USA	Christie Rampone
4	DF	USA	Cat Whitehill
5	MF	USA	Brittany Klein
6	DF	USA	**Amy LePeilbet**
7	MF	USA	**Shannon Boxx**
8	DF	USA	**Tina Ellertson**
9	MF	USA	Heather O'Reilly
10	FW	BRA	**Marta**
11	FW	BRA	Cristiane
12	FW	CAN	Christine Sinclair
13	FW	USA	Kristine Lilly
15	MF	USA	Megan Rapinoe

No.	Pos.	Nation	Player
17	MF	USA	**Lori Chalupny**
18	MF	JPN	Aya Miyama
20	FW	USA	Abby Wambach
23	GK	CAN	**Karina LeBlanc**
25	FW	USA	Tiffeny Milbrett
78	GK	USA	Hope Solo
—	MF	FRA	**Camille Abily***
—	FW	ENG	**Eniola Aluko***
—	MF	FRA	**Sonia Bompastor***
—	MF	BRA	Formiga
—	DF	ENG	**Alex Scott***
—	MF	ENG	**Kelly Smith***

Bold indicates Starting XI from voting results
* Indicates Starting XI players who were on national team duty in Europe at gametime
Italic indicates runners-up replacing Starting XI players on European national team duty - Tiffeny Milbrett replaced Formiga
Regular typeface indicates "At Large" player selections

=== Umeå IK ===
Note: Flags indicate national team as defined under FIFA eligibility rules; some limited exceptions apply. Players may hold more than one non-FIFA nationality.

No.	Pos.	Nation	Player
3	DF	SWE	Johanna Frisk*
5	DF	SWE	Emma Berglund
6	MF	SWE	Malin Moström
9	FW	SWE	Madeleine Edlund
10	MF	SWE	Hanna Ljungberg
11	MF	JPN	Mami Yamaguchi
15	MF	SWE	Emelie Konradsson
18	FW	SWE	Sofia Jacobsson
19	FW	SUI	Ramona Bachmann

No.	Pos.	Nation	Player
20	DF	BRA	Elaine
21	GK	SWE	Carola Söberg
23	MF	SWE	Emma Åberg-Zingmark
24	DF	SWE	Emma Kullberg
25	FW	SWE	Ida Åberg-Zingmark
26	DF	SWE	Elin Landström
91	DF	SWE	Frida Ostberg*
92	DF	SWE	Karolina Westberg
99	FW	SWE	Anna Sjöström

Squad announcement
* Due to Umeå also missing players for the European championships, these WPS players played for their former club.

== Match details ==
2009-08-30
16:30 CDT

WPS All-Stars (United States)	4 - 2	(Sweden) Umeå IK
Lilly 24'; Marta 40'; Cristiane (yellow card) 45+'; Sinclair 47' 49'	Boxscore	Edlund 2'; Jacobsson 16'; Elaine (yellow card) 57'

Soccer Park, Fenton, Missouri
Attendance: 4,115
Referee: Sandra Serafini (USA)

Woman of the Match:
Christie Rampone
Assistant referees:
Teresa Miguel
Stephanie Toth
Fourth official:
Dallas Malhiwsky

=== Statistics ===
	WPS	Umeå
Goals scored	4	2
Total shots	28	11
Shots on target	16	7
Total Saves	5	11
Fouls	5	8
Offsides	4	4
Corner kicks	9	6
Yellow cards	1	1
Red cards	0	0
