= 2007 UEFA Women's Cup final =

Football match

2007 UEFA Women's Cup Final
- Event: 2006–07 UEFA Women's Cup
| Umeå | Arsenal |
| (Sweden) | (England) |
| 0 | 1 |

First leg
| Umeå | Arsenal |
| 0 | 1 |
- Date: 21 April 2007
- Venue: Gammliavallen, Umeå
- Referee: Christine Beck (Germany)
- Attendance: 6,265

Second leg
| Arsenal | Umeå |
| 0 | 0 |
- Date: 29 April 2007
- Venue: Meadow Park, Borehamwood
- Referee: Nicole Petignat (Switzerland)
- Attendance: 3,467

The 2007 UEFA Women's Cup Final was played on 21 and 29 April 2007 between Arsenal of England and Umeå of Sweden. It was the first final not to feature German teams since the 2003 final. Arsenal won 1–0 on aggregate.

Arsenal were chasing an unprecedented quadruple having already secured the Women's Premier League, Women's FA Cup and Women's Premier League Cup. In reaching the last two, Arsenal became the first English team to reach the UEFA Women's Cup Final, and by winning became the first to become champions of Europe.

Arsenal W.F.C went on to reach four more European semi-finals (2011, 2012, 2013, and 2023) but did not reach the final again until 2025, when they defeated Barcelona 1–0 to become two time European champions. No other English team has won the competition under either of its names. Umeå would go on to reach back to back finals but would ultimately lose to Frankfurt Frauen by a score of 4–3 over two legs. That would end up being the Swedish side's last final in the competition as of 2025.

== Match details ==
=== First leg ===
21 April 2007
14:00 UTC+2

| Umeå (Sweden) | 0–1 | (England) Arsenal |
|---|---|---|
| | Report | Scott 90+1' |

Gammliavallen, Umeå
Attendance: 6,265
Referee: Christine Beck (Germany)

| Umeå | Arsenal |

UMEÅ:
| GK | 53 | (Sweden) Carola Söberg |
| DF | 2 | (Sweden) Anna Paulson |
| DF | 3 | (Sweden) Johanna Frisk |
| DF | 4 | (Sweden) Karolina Westberg (c) |
| DF | 89 | (Sweden) Maria Bergkvist |
| MF | 7 | (Sweden) Lisa Dahlqvist | (substituted off) 76' |
| MF | 14 | (Norway) Lise Klaveness |
| MF | 20 | (Brazil) Elaine |
| FW | 10 | (Sweden) Hanna Ljungberg | (substituted off) 63' |
| FW | 13 | (Sweden) Madeleine Edlund |
| FW | 60 | (Brazil) Marta |
Substitutes:
| GK | 30 | (Sweden) Ulla-Karin Rönnlund |
| DF | 6 | (Sweden) Emma Berglund |
| MF | 12 | (Norway) June Pedersen |
| MF | 77 | (Sweden) Emelie Konradsson |
| FW | 11 | (Sweden) Erika Karlsson |
| FW | 18 | (China) Ma Xiaoxu | (substituted on) 63' |
| FW | 19 | (Switzerland) Ramona Bachmann | (substituted on) 76' |
Manager:
(Sweden) Andrée Jeglertz

ARSENAL:
| GK | 1 | (Republic of Ireland) Emma Byrne |
| DF | 23 | (England) Mary Phillip |
| DF | 7 | (Republic of Ireland) Ciara Grant |
| DF | 18 | (England) Anita Asante |
| DF | 12 | (England) Alex Scott |
| MF | 4 | (Wales) Jayne Ludlow (c) | (yellow card) 15' |
| MF | 17 | (England) Katie Chapman |
| MF | 11 | (England) Rachel Yankey |
| FW | 9 | (England) Lianne Sanderson |
| FW | 10 | (Scotland) Julie Fleeting |
| FW | 14 | (England) Karen Carney | | (substituted off) 89' |
Substitutes:
| GK | 24 | (England) Rebecca Spencer |
| DF | 3 | (Republic of Ireland) Yvonne Tracy |
| DF | 4 | (England) Faye White |
| DF | 5 | (England) Leanne Champ |
| DF | 26 | (England) Gilly Flaherty |
| MF | 16 | (England) Sian Larkin |
| MF | 20 | (England) Gemma Davison | | (substituted on) 89' |
Manager:
(England) Vic Akers

=== Second leg ===
29 April 2007
13:00 UTC+1

| Arsenal (England) | 0–0 | (Sweden) Umeå |
|---|---|---|
| | Report |

Meadow Park, Borehamwood
Attendance: 3,467
Referee: Nicole Petignat (Switzerland)

| Arsenal | Umeå |

ARSENAL:
| GK | 1 | (Republic of Ireland) Emma Byrne |
| DF | 23 | (England) Mary Phillip | (yellow card) 77' |
| DF | 7 | (Republic of Ireland) Ciara Grant |
| DF | 18 | (England) Anita Asante |
| DF | 12 | (England) Alex Scott |
| MF | 4 | (Wales) Jayne Ludlow (c) | (yellow card) 87' | (substituted off) 90' |
| MF | 17 | (England) Katie Chapman |
| MF | 11 | (England) Rachel Yankey |
| FW | 9 | (England) Lianne Sanderson |
| FW | 10 | (Scotland) Julie Fleeting |
| FW | 14 | (England) Karen Carney |
Substitutes:
| GK | 24 | (England) Rebecca Spencer |
| DF | 3 | (Republic of Ireland) Yvonne Tracy |
| DF | 4 | (England) Faye White | | (substituted on) 90' |
| DF | 5 | (England) Leanne Champ |
| DF | 26 | (England) Gilly Flaherty |
| MF | 16 | (England) Sian Larkin |
| MF | 20 | (England) Gemma Davison |
Manager:
(England) Vic Akers

UMEÅ:
| GK | 53 | (Sweden) Carola Söberg |
| DF | 2 | (Sweden) Anna Paulson |
| DF | 3 | (Sweden) Johanna Frisk |
| DF | 4 | (Sweden) Karolina Westberg (c) |
| DF | 89 | (Sweden) Maria Bergkvist |
| MF | 7 | (Sweden) Lisa Dahlqvist | (substituted off) 55' |
| MF | 14 | (Norway) Lise Klaveness |
| MF | 20 | (Brazil) Elaine |
| FW | 10 | (Sweden) Hanna Ljungberg |
| FW | 18 | (China) Ma Xiaoxu | (substituted off) 72' |
| FW | 60 | (Brazil) Marta |
Substitutes:
| GK | 30 | (Sweden) Ulla-Karin Rönnlund |
| DF | 6 | (Sweden) Emma Berglund |
| MF | 12 | (Norway) June Pedersen |
| MF | 77 | (Sweden) Emelie Konradsson |
| FW | 11 | (Sweden) Erika Karlsson |
| FW | 13 | (Sweden) Madeleine Edlund | (substituted on) 55' |
| FW | 19 | (Switzerland) Ramona Bachmann | (substituted on) 72' |
Manager:
(Sweden) Andrée Jeglertz
