= 2008 UEFA Women's Cup final =

- Event: 2007–08 UEFA Women's Cup
Umeå	Frankfurt
(Sweden)	(Germany)
3	4

First leg
Umeå	Frankfurt
1	1
- Date: 17 May 2008
- Venue: Gammliavallen, Umeå
- Referee: Gyöngyi Gaál
- Attendance: 4,128

Second leg
Frankfurt	Umeå
3	2
- Date: 24 May 2008
- Venue: Commerzbank-Arena, Frankfurt
- Referee: Alexandra Ihringova
- Attendance: 27,640

The 2008 UEFA Women's Cup final was played on 17 May and 24 May 2008 between Frankfurt of Germany and Umeå of Sweden. Frankfurt won 4–3 on aggregate.

== Match details ==
=== First leg ===
17 May 2008
13:00 UTC+2

Umeå (Sweden)	1–1	(Germany) Frankfurt
Marta 1'	Report	Pohlers 5'

Gammliavallen, Umeå
Attendance: 4,128
Referee: Gyöngyi Gaál (Hungary)

Umeå	Frankfurt

GK	1	(Sweden) Ulla-Karin Rönnlund
DF	2	(Sweden) Anna Paulson
DF	3	(Sweden) Johanna Frisk	(yellow card) 90+2'
DF	4	(Sweden) Karolina Westberg (c)
DF	91	(Sweden) Frida Östberg
MF	7	(Sweden) Lisa Dahlkvist
MF	16	(Japan) Mami Yamaguchi
FW	19	(Switzerland) Ramona Bachmann		(substituted off) 68'
FW	60	(Brazil) Marta
FW	9	(Sweden) Madeleine Edlund
FW	13	(Denmark) Johanna Rasmussen
Substitutes:
GK	21	(Sweden) Carola Söberg
DF	5	(Sweden) Emma Berglund
MF	12	(Norway) June Pedersen
MF	15	(Sweden) Emmelie Konradsson		(substituted on) 68'
MF	17	(Sweden) Emma Åberg-Zingmark
FW	18	(Sweden) Sofia Jakobsson
Manager:
Andrée Jeglertz

GK	1	(Germany) Silke Rottenberg
DF	2	(United States) Gina Lewandowski
DF	8	(Germany) Tina Wunderlich
DF	14	(United States) Alexandra Krieger
MF	11	(Germany) Katrin Kliehm		(substituted off) 56'
MF	12	(Germany) Meike Weber	(yellow card) 87'
MF	25	(Germany) Saskia Bartusiak
FW	6	(Germany) Conny Pohlers		(substituted off) 83'
FW	9	(Germany) Birgit Prinz	(yellow card) 90'
FW	18	(Germany) Kerstin Garefrekes (c)	(yellow card) 37'
FW	20	(Germany) Petra Wimbersky
Substitutes:
GK	23	(Switzerland) Stephanie Ullrich
DF	13	(Germany) Sarah Günther		(substituted on) 56'
DF	16	(Germany) Anna Marciak
DF	26	(Germany) Anne Engel
MF	3	(Denmark) Louise Hansen
MF	21	(Germany) Karolin Thomas
MF	28	(Germany) Sandra Smisek		(substituted on) 83'
Manager:
Hans-Jürgen Tritschoks

=== Second leg ===
24 May 2008
14:15 UTC+2

Frankfurt (Germany)	3–2	(Sweden) Umeå
Pohlers 7', 55'; Wimbersky 71'	Report	Dahlkvist 68' (pen.); Östberg 83'

Commerzbank-Arena, Frankfurt
Attendance: 27,640
Referee: Alexandra Ihringova (England)

Frankfurt	Umeå

GK	1	(Germany) Silke Rottenberg		(substituted off) 46'
DF	2	(United States) Gina Lewandowski
DF	8	(Germany) Tina Wunderlich		(substituted off) 90'
DF	14	(United States) Alexandra Krieger
MF	11	(Germany) Katrin Kliehm	(yellow card) 15'	(substituted off) 47'
MF	12	(Germany) Meike Weber
MF	25	(Germany) Saskia Bartusiak
FW	6	(Germany) Conny Pohlers
FW	9	(Germany) Birgit Prinz
FW	18	(Germany) Kerstin Garefrekes (c)
FW	20	(Germany) Petra Wimbersky
Substitutes:
GK	23	(Germany) Stephanie Ullrich		(substituted on) 46'
DF	13	(Germany) Sarah Günther		(substituted on) 47'
DF	16	(Germany) Anna Marciak
DF	26	(Germany) Anne Engel
MF	3	(Denmark) Louise Hansen
MF	21	(Germany) Karolin Thomas		(substituted on) 90'
MF	28	(Germany) Sandra Smisek
Manager:
Hans-Jürgen Tritschoks

GK	1	(Sweden) Ulla-Karin Rönnlund
DF	2	(Sweden) Anna Paulson
DF	3	(Sweden) Johanna Frisk
DF	4	(Sweden) Karolina Westberg (c)
DF	5	(Sweden) Emma Berglund	(substituted off) 46'
DF	91	(Sweden) Frida Östberg
MF	7	(Sweden) Lisa Dahlkvist
MF	16	(Japan) Mami Yamaguchi
FW	60	(Brazil) Marta
FW	9	(Sweden) Madeleine Edlund	(substituted off) 63'
FW	13	(Denmark) Johanna Rasmussen
Substitutes:
GK	21	(Sweden) Carola Söberg
MF	12	(Norway) June Pedersen
MF	15	(Sweden) Emmelie Konradsson
MF	17	(Sweden) Emma Åberg-Zingmark
FW	18	(Sweden) Sofia Jakobsson	(substituted on) 63'
FW	19	(Switzerland) Ramona Bachmann	(substituted on) 46'
Manager:
Andrée Jeglertz
