= List of UEFA Women's Cup and Women's Champions League finals =

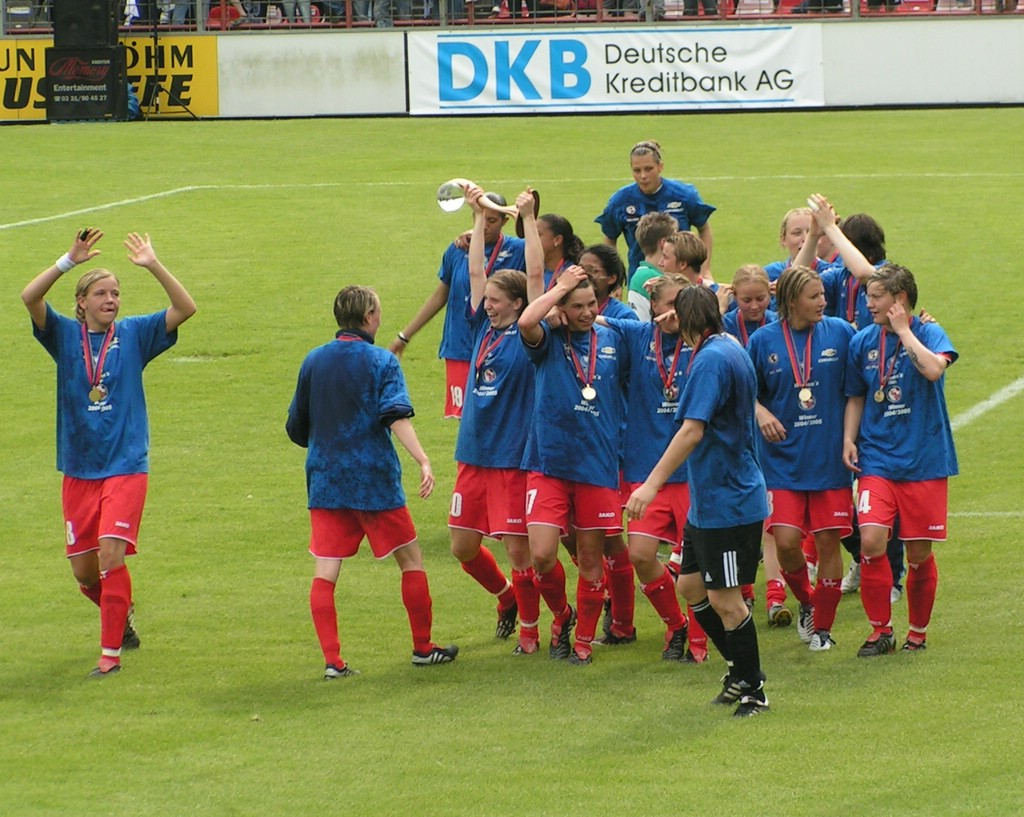
The players of Turbine Potsdam celebrate their victory in 2005.

The UEFA Women's Champions League is a women's association football competition established in 2001. It is the only international competition for European women's football clubs. The competition is open to the league champions of all UEFA member associations who run such championships; 46 of UEFA's 53 member associations have entered. The top eight associations may enter two teams, and the title holder is also entitled to an additional spot if they do not qualify through their domestic league. The first final was held in a single match final. Between 2003 and 2009, the final was contested in two legs, one at each participating club's home, but the single match was reinstated in 2010. The competition was known as UEFA Women's Cup until 2009.

French side OL Lyonnes hold the record with eight titles. They and VfL Wolfsburg hold the distinction of losing the most finals with four. Germany is the most successful member association with nine titles.

== List of finals ==
Key
†	Match was won during extra time
*	Match won after a penalty shoot-out

UEFA Women's Cup and UEFA Women's Champions League finals
Season	Country	Winners	Score	Runners-up	Country	Venue	Attendance
2001–02	Germany	1. FFC Frankfurt	2–0	Umeå	Sweden	Waldstadion, Frankfurt, Germany	12,106
2002–03	Sweden	Umeå	4–1	Fortuna Hjørring	Denmark	Gammliavallen, Umeå, Sweden	7,648
2002–03	Sweden	Umeå	3–0	Fortuna Hjørring	Denmark	Hjørring Stadium, Hjørring, Denmark	2,119
2003–04	Sweden	Umeå	3–0	1. FFC Frankfurt	Germany	Råsunda Stadium, Stockholm, Sweden	5,409
2003–04	Sweden	Umeå	5–0	1. FFC Frankfurt	Germany	Bornheimer Hang, Frankfurt, Germany	9,500
2004–05	Germany	Turbine Potsdam	2–0	Djurgården/Älvsjö	Sweden	Olympic Stadium, Stockholm, Sweden	1,382
2004–05	Germany	Turbine Potsdam	3–1	Djurgården/Älvsjö	Sweden	Karl-Liebknecht-Stadion, Potsdam, Germany	8,677
2005–06	Germany	1. FFC Frankfurt	4–0	Turbine Potsdam	Germany	Karl-Liebknecht-Stadion, Potsdam, Germany	4,431
2005–06	Germany	1. FFC Frankfurt	3–2	Turbine Potsdam	Germany	Bornheimer Hang, Frankfurt, Germany	13,200
2006–07	England	Arsenal	1–0	Umeå	Sweden	Gammliavallen, Umeå, Sweden	6,265
2006–07	England	Arsenal	0–0	Umeå	Sweden	Meadow Park, Borehamwood, England	3,467
2007–08	Germany	1. FFC Frankfurt	1–1	Umeå	Sweden	Gammliavallen, Umeå, Sweden	4,128
2007–08	Germany	1. FFC Frankfurt	3–2	Umeå	Sweden	Waldstadion, Frankfurt, Germany	27,640
2008–09	Germany	FCR Duisburg	6–0	Zvezda Perm	Russia	Central Stadium, Kazan, Russia	700
2008–09	Germany	FCR Duisburg	1–1	Zvezda Perm	Russia	MSV-Arena, Duisburg, Germany	28,112
2009–10	Germany	Turbine Potsdam	0–0* (Note: Score was 0–0 after 90 minutes and extra time. Turbine Potsdam won the penalty shoot-out 7–6.)	Lyon	France	Coliseum Alfonso Pérez, Getafe, Spain	10,372
2010–11	France	Lyon	2–0	Turbine Potsdam	Germany	Craven Cottage, London, England	14,303
2011–12	France	Lyon	2–0	1. FFC Frankfurt	Germany	Olympiastadion, Munich, Germany	50,212
2012–13	Germany	VfL Wolfsburg	1–0	Lyon	France	Stamford Bridge, London, England	19,278
2013–14	Germany	VfL Wolfsburg	4–3	Tyresö	Sweden	Estádio do Restelo, Lisbon, Portugal	11,217
2014–15	Germany	1. FFC Frankfurt	2–1	Paris Saint-Germain	France	Friedrich-Ludwig-Jahn-Sportpark, Berlin, Germany	17,147
2015–16	France	Lyon	1–1* (Note: Score was 1–1 after 90 minutes and extra time. Lyon won the penalty shoot-out 4–3.)	VfL Wolfsburg	Germany	Stadio Città del Tricolore, Reggio Emilia, Italy	15,117
2016–17	France	Lyon	0–0* (Note: Score was 0–0 after 90 minutes and extra time. Lyon won the penalty shoot-out 7–6.)	Paris Saint-Germain	France	Cardiff City Stadium, Cardiff, Wales	22,433
2017–18	France	Lyon	4–1^{†}	VfL Wolfsburg	Germany	Valeriy Lobanovskyi Dynamo Stadium, Kyiv, Ukraine	14,237
2018–19	France	Lyon	4–1	Barcelona	Spain	Ferencváros Stadion, Budapest, Hungary	19,487
2019–20	France	Lyon	3–1	VfL Wolfsburg	Germany	Anoeta Stadium, San Sebastián, Spain	0 (Note: The 2020 and 2021 finals were played behind closed doors due to the COVID-19 pandemic in Europe.)
2020–21	Spain	Barcelona	4–0	Chelsea	England	Gamla Ullevi, Gothenburg, Sweden	0
2021–22	France	Lyon	3–1	Barcelona	Spain	Juventus Stadium, Turin, Italy	32,257
2022–23	Spain	Barcelona	3–2	VfL Wolfsburg	Germany	PSV Stadion, Eindhoven, Netherlands	33,147
2023–24	Spain	Barcelona	2–0	Lyon	France	San Mamés, Bilbao, Spain	50,827
2024–25	England	Arsenal	1–0	Barcelona	Spain	Estádio José Alvalade, Lisbon, Portugal	38,356
2025–26	Spain	Barcelona	4−0	OL Lyonnes	France	Ullevaal Stadion, Oslo, Norway	24,258

Upcoming final(s)
Season	Country	Finalist	Match	Finalist	Country	Venue
2026–27			v			Stadion Narodowy, Warsaw, Poland
2027–28			v			Parc Olympique Lyonnais, Lyon, France
2028–29			v			Millennium Stadium, Cardiff, Wales

== Performances ==
=== By teams ===
Performances in the UEFA Women's Cup and UEFA Women's Champions League by club
Club	Titles	Runners-up	Seasons won	Seasons runners-up
(France) OL Lyonnes	8	4	2011, 2012, 2016, 2017, 2018, 2019, 2020, 2022	2010, 2013, 2024, 2026
(Spain) Barcelona	4	3	2021, 2023, 2024, 2026	2019, 2022, 2025
(Germany) Eintracht Frankfurt	4	2	2002, 2006, 2008, 2015	2004, 2012
(Germany) VfL Wolfsburg	2	4	2013, 2014	2016, 2018, 2020, 2023
(Sweden) Umeå	2	3	2003, 2004	2002, 2007, 2008
(Germany) Turbine Potsdam	2	2	2005, 2010	2006, 2011
(England) Arsenal	2	0	2007, 2025	
(Germany) FCR Duisburg	1	0	2009	
(France) Paris Saint-Germain	0	2		2015, 2017
(Denmark) Fortuna Hjørring	0	1		2003
(Sweden) Djurgården	0	1		2005
(Russia) Zvezda Perm	0	1		2009
(Sweden) Tyresö	0	1		2014
(England) Chelsea	0	1		2021

=== By nation ===
Performances in finals by nation
Nation	Titles	Runners-up	Total
Germany	9	8	17
France	8	6	14
Spain	4	3	7
Sweden	2	5	7
England	2	1	3
Denmark	0	1	1
Russia	0	1	1

== See also ==
- List of European Cup and UEFA Champions League finals
- List of UEFA Cup and Europa League finals
- List of UEFA Cup Winners' Cup finals
- List of UEFA Intertoto Cup winners
- List of UEFA Super Cup matches
