= Swedish women's football clubs in European competitions =

This is a list of Swedish women's football clubs in European competition. Swedish clubs have participated since 2001, when Umeå IK entered the 2001–02 UEFA Women's Cup. Umeå IK's debut came against Sparta Prague of Czech Republic and Anna Sjöström scored Umeå IK's and Swedish clubs' first goal in European competition in the match that ended 1–0 to Umeå IK. A total of eleven clubs have participated in UEFA competitions throughout the years.

Umeå IK has won the UEFA Women's Cup twice, by beating Fortuna Hjørring in the 2003 final and 1. FFC Frankfurt in the 2004 final. Umeå IK also reached three more finals, while Djurgården/Älvsjö reached the final once. During the Women's Champions League era, also Tyresö FF reached the final once.

== Statistics ==
- Most Women's Cup/Women's Champions League competitions appeared in: 13 – Malmö FF/LdB FC Malmö/FC Rosengård
- Most competitions appeared in overall: 13 – Malmö FF/LdB FC Malmö/FC Rosengård
- First match played: Umeå IK 1–0 Sparta Prague, 3 October 2001 (2001–02 UEFA Women's Cup group stage)
- Most matches played: 73 – Malmö FF/LdB FC Malmö/FC Rosengård
- Most match wins: 45 – Umeå IK
- Most match draws: 13 – Umeå IK
- Most match losses: 28 – Malmö FF/LdB FC Malmö/FC Rosengård
- Biggest win (match): 15 goals – Umeå IK 15–0 Newtonabbey Strikers (2003–04 UEFA Women's Cup group stage)
- Biggest win (aggregate): 17 goals – FC Rosengård 17–0 Lanchkhuti (2020–21 UEFA Women's Champions League round of 32)
- Biggest defeat (match): 9 goals – Barcelona 9–0 Hammarby IF (2024–25 UEFA Women's Champions League group stage)
- Biggest defeat (aggregate): 8 goals – FC Rosengård 0–8 Lyon (2012–13 UEFA Women's Champions League quarter-finals)

== Appearances in UEFA competitions ==
As of 11 January 2025

Club	Total	WCL	First appearance	Last appearance
Djurgården/Älvsjö	2	2	2004–05 UEFA Women's Cup	2005–06 UEFA Women's Cup
Eskilstuna United DFF	1	1	2016–17 UEFA Women's Champions League	2016–17 UEFA Women's Champions League
Kopparbergs/Göteborg FC/BK Häcken	8	8	2011–12 UEFA Women's Champions League	2024–25 UEFA Women's Champions League
Hammarby IF	1	1	2024–25 UEFA Women's Champions League	2024–25 UEFA Women's Champions League
KIF Örebro	1	1	2015–16 UEFA Women's Champions League	2015–16 UEFA Women's Champions League
Kristianstads DFF	2	2	2021–22 UEFA Women's Champions League	2022–23 UEFA Women's Champions League
Linköpings FC	7	7	2009–10 UEFA Women's Champions League	2024–25 UEFA Women's Champions League
Piteå IF	1	1	2019–20 UEFA Women's Champions League	2019–20 UEFA Women's Champions League
Malmö FF/LdB FC Malmö/FC Rosengård	13	13	2003–04 UEFA Women's Cup	2023–24 UEFA Women's Champions League
Tyresö FF	1	1	2013–14 UEFA Women's Champions League	2013–14 UEFA Women's Champions League
Umeå IK	9	9	2001–02 UEFA Women's Cup	2010–11 UEFA Women's Champions League

== Active competitions ==
=== UEFA Women's Champions League ===
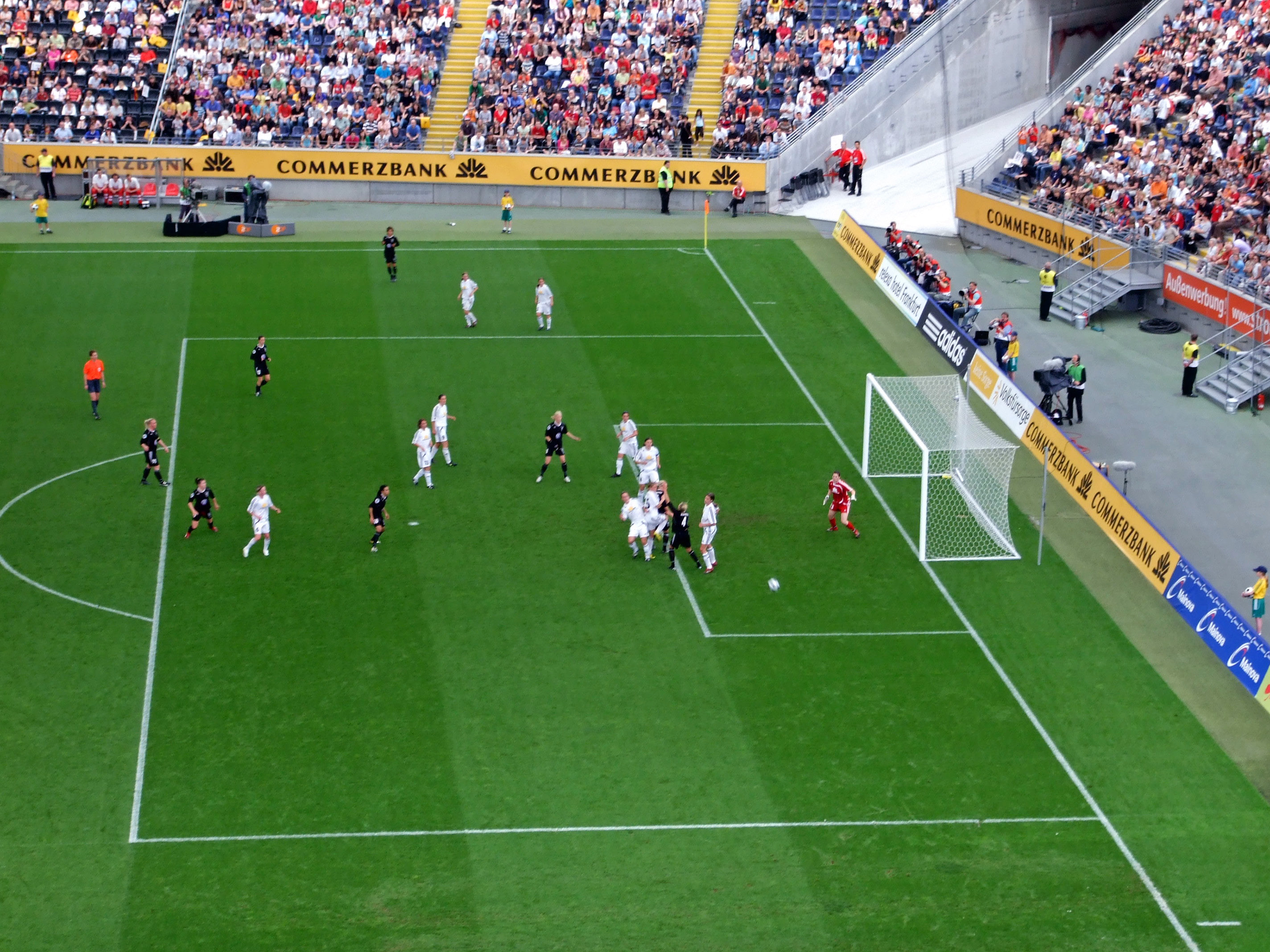
1. FFC Frankfurt–Umeå IK at Commerzbank Arena in Frankfurt, during the final of the 2007–08 UEFA Women's Cup

These are the appearances of Swedish football clubs in the UEFA Women's Cup and the UEFA Women's Champions League:

Season	Club	Round	Opponent	Home	Away	Agg
UEFA Women's Cup
2001–02	Umeå IK	GS	(Czech Republic) Sparta Prague	1–0		1st
2001–02	Umeå IK	GS	(Bulgaria) Grand Hotel Varna	3–0		1st
2001–02	Umeå IK	GS	(Hungary) Auto Trade Femina	6–0		1st
2001–02	Umeå IK	QF	(Russia) Ryazan-VDV	4–1	3–1	7–2
2001–02	Umeå IK	SF	(Finland) HJK	2–1	1–0	3–1
2001–02	Umeå IK	F	(Germany) 1. FFC Frankfurt	0–2		
2002–03	Umeå IK	GS	(Faroe Islands) KÍ	7–0		1st
2002–03	Umeå IK	GS	(Estonia) Visa Tallinn	4–0		1st
2002–03	Umeå IK	GS	(Czech Republic) Sparta Prague	6–1		1st
2002–03	Umeå IK	QF	(France) Toulouse	2–0	0–0	2–0
2002–03	Umeå IK	SF	(Germany) 1. FFC Frankfurt	1–1	1–1	2–2 (7–6 p)
2002–03	Umeå IK	F	(Denmark) Fortuna Hjørring	4–1	3–0	7–1
2003–04	Malmö FF	2QR	(Finland) FC United	3–0		1st
2003–04	Malmö FF	2QR	(Israel) Maccabi Holon	6–1		1st
2003–04	Malmö FF	2QR	(Ukraine) Lehenda-Cheksil	3–0		1st
2003–04	Malmö FF	QF	(Norway) Kolbotn	2–0	0–1	2–1
2003–04	Malmö FF	SF	(Germany) 1. FFC Frankfurt	0–0	1–4	1–4
2003–04	Umeå IK	2QR	(Wales) Newtonabbey Strikers	15–0		1st
2003–04	Umeå IK	2QR	(Romania) Clujana	6–0		1st
2003–04	Umeå IK	2QR	(Czech Republic) Slavia Prague	2–1		1st
2003–04	Umeå IK	QF	(Russia) Energy Voronezh	2–1	2–1	4–2
2003–04	Umeå IK	SF	(Denmark) Brøndby	1–0	3–2	4–2
2003–04	Umeå IK	F	(Germany) 1. FFC Frankfurt	3–0	5–0	8–0
2004–05	Djurgården/Älvsjö	2QR	(Greece) Aegina	5–0		2nd
2004–05	Djurgården/Älvsjö	2QR	(Spain) Athletic Bilbao	3–2		2nd
2004–05	Djurgården/Älvsjö	2QR	(England) Arsenal	0–1		2nd
2004–05	Djurgården/Älvsjö	QF	(Sweden) Umeå IK	2–1	1–0	3–1
2004–05	Djurgården/Älvsjö	SF	(England) Arsenal	1–1	1–0	2–1
2004–05	Djurgården/Älvsjö	F	(Germany) Turbine Potsdam	0–2	1–3	1–5
2004–05	Umeå IK	2QR	(Slovenia) ŽNK Krka	7–1		1st
2004–05	Umeå IK	2QR	(Belarus) Bobruichanka Bobruisk	5–1		1st
2004–05	Umeå IK	2QR	(Serbia and Montenegro) Mašinac Classic Niš	8–0		1st
2004–05	Umeå IK	QF	(Sweden) Djurgården/Älvsjö	0–1	1–2	1–3
2005–06	Djurgården/Älvsjö	2QR	(Iceland) Valur	2–1		1st
2005–06	Djurgården/Älvsjö	2QR	(Kazakhstan) Alma KTZh	3–0		1st
2005–06	Djurgården/Älvsjö	2QR	(Serbia and Montenegro) Mašinac Classic Niš	7–0		1st
2005–06	Djurgården/Älvsjö	QF	(Czech Republic) Sparta Prague	0–0	2–0	2–0
2005–06	Djurgården/Älvsjö	SF	(Germany) Turbine Potsdam	2–5	3–2	5–7
2006–07	Umeå IK	2QR	(Ukraine) Lehenda-Cheksil	2–0		1st
2006–07	Umeå IK	2QR	(Spain) Espanyol	3–0		1st
2006–07	Umeå IK	2QR	(Norway) Kolbotn	2–1		1st
2006–07	Umeå IK	QF	(Netherlands) Saestum	5–2	6–1	11–3
2006–07	Umeå IK	SF	(Norway) Kolbotn	6–0	5–1	11–1
2006–07	Umeå IK	F	(England) Arsenal	0–1	0–0	0–1
2007–08	Umeå IK	2QR	(Romania) Clujana	3–1		1st
2007–08	Umeå IK	2QR	(Belarus) Universitet Vitebsk	2–0		1st
2007–08	Umeå IK	2QR	(Russia) Rossiyanka	2–2		1st
2007–08	Umeå IK	QF	(Belgium) Rapide Wezemaal	6–0	4–0	10–0
2007–08	Umeå IK	SF	(France) Lyon	0–0	1–1	1–1 (a)
2007–08	Umeå IK	F	(Germany) 1. FFC Frankfurt	1–1	2–3	3–4
2008–09	Umeå IK	2QR	(Iceland) Valur	5–1		1st
2008–09	Umeå IK	2QR	(Kazakhstan) Alma KTZh	6–0		1st
2008–09	Umeå IK	2QR	(Italy) Bardolino Verona	4–0		1st
2008–09	Umeå IK	QF	(England) Arsenal	6–0	2–3	8–3
2008–09	Umeå IK	SF	(Russia) Zvezda-2005	2–2	0–2	2–4
UEFA Women's Champions League
2009–10	Linköpings FC	QR	(Moldova) Roma Calfa	11–0		1st
2009–10	Linköpings FC	QR	(Northern Ireland) Glentoran	3–0		1st
2009–10	Linköpings FC	QR	(Romania) Clujana	6–0		1st
2009–10	Linköpings FC	R32	(Switzerland) Zürich	3–0	2–0	5–0
2009–10	Linköpings FC	R16	(Germany) Duisburg	0–2	1–1	1–3
2009–10	Umeå IK	R32	(Ukraine) Zhytlobud-1 Kharkiv	6–0	5–0	11–0
2009–10	Umeå IK	R16	(Russia) Rossiyanka	1–1	1–0	2–1
2009–10	Umeå IK	QF	(France) Montpellier	0–0	2–2	2–2 (a)
2009–10	Umeå IK	SF	(France) Lyon	0–0	2–3	2–3
2010–11	Linköpings FC	R32	(Slovenia) ŽNK Krka	5–0	7–0	12–0
2010–11	Linköpings FC	R16	(Czech Republic) Sparta Prague	2–0	1–0	3–0
2010–11	Linköpings FC	QF	(England) Arsenal	2–2	1–1	3–3
2010–11	Umeå IK	QR	(Israel) ASA Tel Aviv	3–0		2nd
2010–11	Umeå IK	QR	(Cyprus) Apollon Limassol	1–4		2nd
2010–11	Umeå IK	QR	(Bosnia and Herzegovina) SFK 2000 Sarajevo	1–0		2nd
2011–12	Kopparbergs/Göteborg FC	R32	(Croatia) Osijek	7–0	4–0	11–0
2011–12	Kopparbergs/Göteborg FC	R16	(Denmark) Fortuna Hjørring	3–2	1–0	4–2
2011–12	Kopparbergs/Göteborg FC	QF	(England) Arsenal	1–0	1–3	2–3
2011–12	LdB FC Malmö	R32	(Italy) Tavagnacco	5–0	1–2	6–2
2011–12	LdB FC Malmö	R16	(Austria) Neulengbach	1–0	3–1	4–1
2011–12	LdB FC Malmö	QF	(Germany) 1. FFC Frankfurt	1–0	0–3	1–3
2012–13	Kopparbergs/Göteborg FC	R32	(Serbia) Spartak Subotica	3–0	1–0	4–0
2012–13	Kopparbergs/Göteborg FC	R16	(Denmark) Fortuna Hjørring	3–2	1–1	4–3
2012–13	Kopparbergs/Göteborg FC	QF	(France) Juvisy	1–3	0–1	1–4
2012–13	LdB FC Malmö	R32	(Hungary) MTK Hungária	6–1	4–0	10–1
2012–13	LdB FC Malmö	R16	(Italy) Bardolino Verona	1–0	2–0	3–0
2012–13	LdB FC Malmö	QF	(France) Lyon	0–3	0–5	0–8
2013–14	LdB FC Malmö	R32	(Norway) LSK	5–0	3–1	8–1
2013–14	LdB FC Malmö	R16	(Germany) Wolfsburg	1–2	1–3	2–5
2013–14	Tyresö FF	R32	(France) Paris Saint-Germain	2–1	0–0	2–1
2013–14	Tyresö FF	R16	(Denmark) Fortuna Hjørring	4–0	2–1	6–1
2013–14	Tyresö FF	QF	(Austria) Neulengbach	8–1	0–0	8–1
2013–14	Tyresö FF	SF	(England) Birmingham	3–0	0–0	3–0
2013–14	Tyresö FF	F	(Germany) Wolfsburg	3–4		
2014–15	Linköpings FC	R32	(England) Liverpool	3–0	1–2	4–2
2014–15	Linköpings FC	R16	(Russia) Zvezda-2005	5–0	0–3	5–3
2014–15	Linköpings FC	QF	(Denmark) Brøndby	0–1	1–1	1–2
2014–15	FC Rosengård	R32	(Russia) Ryazan-VDV	2–0	3–1	5–1
2014–15	FC Rosengård	R16	(Denmark) Fortuna Hjørring	2–1	2–0	4–1
2014–15	FC Rosengård	QF	(Germany) Wolfsburg	3–3	1–1	4–4 (a)
2015–16	KIF Örebro	R32	(Greece) PAOK	5–0	3–0	8–0
2015–16	KIF Örebro	R16	(France) Paris Saint-Germain	1–1	0–0	1–1
2015–16	FC Rosengård	R32	(Finland) PK-35	7–0	2–0	9–0
2015–16	FC Rosengård	R16	(Italy) AGSM Verona	5–1	3–1	8–2
2015–16	FC Rosengård	QF	(Germany) 1. FFC Frankfurt	0–1	1–0	1–1 (4–5 p)
2016–17	Eskilstuna United	R32	(Scotland) Glasgow City	1–0	2–1	3–1
2016–17	Eskilstuna United	R16	(Germany) Wolfsburg	1–5	0–3	1–8
2016–17	FC Rosengård	R32	(Iceland) Breiðablik	0–0	1–0	1–0
2016–17	FC Rosengård	R16	(Czech Republic) Slavia Prague	3–0	3–1	6–1
2016–17	FC Rosengård	QF	(Spain) FC Barcelona	0–1	0–2	0–3
2017–18	Linköpings FC	R32	(Cyprus) Apollon Limassol	3–0	1–0	4–0
2017–18	Linköpings FC	R16	(Czech Republic) Sparta Prague	3–0	1–1	4–1
2017–18	Linköpings FC	QF	(England) Manchester City	3–5	0–2	3–7
2017–18	FC Rosengård	R32	(Romania) Olimpia Cluj	4–0	1–0	5–0
2017–18	FC Rosengård	R16	(England) Chelsea	0–1	0–3	0–4
2018–19	Linköpings FC	R32	(Ukraine) Zhytlobud-1 Kharkiv	4–0	6–1	10–1
2018–19	Linköpings FC	R16	(France) Paris Saint-Germain	0–2	2–3	2–5
2018–19	FC Rosengård	R32	(Russia) Ryazan-VDV	2–0	1–0	3–0
2018–19	FC Rosengård	R16	(Czech Republic) Slavia Prague	2–3	0–0	2–3
2019–20	Kopparbergs/Göteborg FC	R32	(Germany) Bayern Munich	1–2	1–0	2–2 (a)
2019–20	Piteå IF	R32	(Denmark) Brøndby	0–1	1–1	1–2
2020–21	Kopparbergs/Göteborg FC	R32	(England) Manchester City	1–2	0–3	1–5
2020–21	FC Rosengård	1R	(Georgia (country)) Lanchkhuti	10–0	7–0	17–0
2020–21	FC Rosengård	2R	(Switzerland) St. Pölten	2–2	2–0	4–2
2020–21	FC Rosengård	QF	(Germany) Bayern Munich	0–1	0–3	0–4
2021–22	BK Häcken	2QR	(Norway) Vålerenga	3–2	3–1	6–3
2021–22	BK Häcken	GS	(France) Lyon	0–3	0–4	4th
2021–22	BK Häcken	GS	(Germany) Bayern Munich	1–5	0–4	4th
2021–22	BK Häcken	GS	(Portugal) Benfica	1–2	1–0	4th
2021–22	Kristianstads DFF	1QR:SF	(Denmark) Brøndby	1–0		
2021–22	Kristianstads DFF	1QR:F	(France) Bordeaux	1–3		
2021–22	FC Rosengård	2QR	(Germany) Hoffenheim	0–3	3–3	3–6
2022–23	BK Häcken	2QR	(France) Paris Saint-Germain	0–2	1–2	1–4
2022–23	Kristianstads DFF	1QR:SF	(Netherlands) Ajax	1–3		
2022–23	Kristianstads DFF	1QR:PF	(Denmark) Fortuna Hjørring	3–2 (a.e.t.)		
2022–23	FC Rosengård	2QR	(Norway) Brann	3–1	1–1	4–2
2022–23	FC Rosengård	GS	(Germany) Bayern Munich	0–4	1–2	4th
2022–23	FC Rosengård	GS	(Spain) FC Barcelona	1–4	0–6	4th
2022–23	FC Rosengård	GS	(Portugal) Benfica	1–3	0–1	4th
2023–24	BK Häcken	2QR	(Netherlands) Twente	2–2	2–1	4–3
2023–24	BK Häcken	GS	(France) Paris FC	0–0	2–1	2nd
2023–24	BK Häcken	GS	(England) Chelsea	1–3	0–0	2nd
2023–24	BK Häcken	GS	(Spain) Real Madrid	2–1	1–0	2nd
2023–24	BK Häcken	QF	(France) Paris Saint-Germain	1–2	0–3	1–5
2023–24	Linköpings FC	1QR:SF	(England) Arsenal	0–3		
2023–24	Linköpings FC	1QR:PF	(Ukraine) Kryvbas Kryvyi Rih	3–0		
2023–24	FC Rosengård	2QR	(Serbia) Spartak Subotica	2–1	5–1	7–2
2023–24	FC Rosengård	GS	(Germany) Eintracht Frankfurt	1–2	0–5	4th
2023–24	FC Rosengård	GS	(Portugal) Benfica	2–2	0–1	4th
2023–24	FC Rosengård	GS	(Spain) FC Barcelona	0–6	0–7	4th
2024–25	BK Häcken	2QR	(England) Arsenal	1–0	0–4	1–4
2024–25	Hammarby IF	2QR	(Portugal) Benfica	1–2	2–0	3–2
2024–25	Hammarby IF	GS	(Austria) St. Pölten	2–0	2–1	3rd
2024–25	Hammarby IF	GS	(Spain) FC Barcelona	0–3	0–9	3rd
2024–25	Hammarby IF	GS	(England) Manchester City	1–2	0–2	3rd
2024–25	Linköpings FC	1QR:SF	(Czech Republic) Sparta Prague	1–3 (a.e.t.)		
2024–25	Linköpings FC	1QR:PF	(Austria) First Vienna	8–0		
