= Landström =

Landström may refer to:

- Björn Landström (1917–2002), Finnish artist and author
- Eeles Landström (1932–2022), Finnish pole vaulter
- Eivor Landström (1919–2004), Swedish actress
- Elin Landström (born 1992), Swedish association footballer
- Jessica Landström (born 1984), Finnish sportsperson
