= Tony Gustavsson =

Swedish footballer and coach (born 1973)

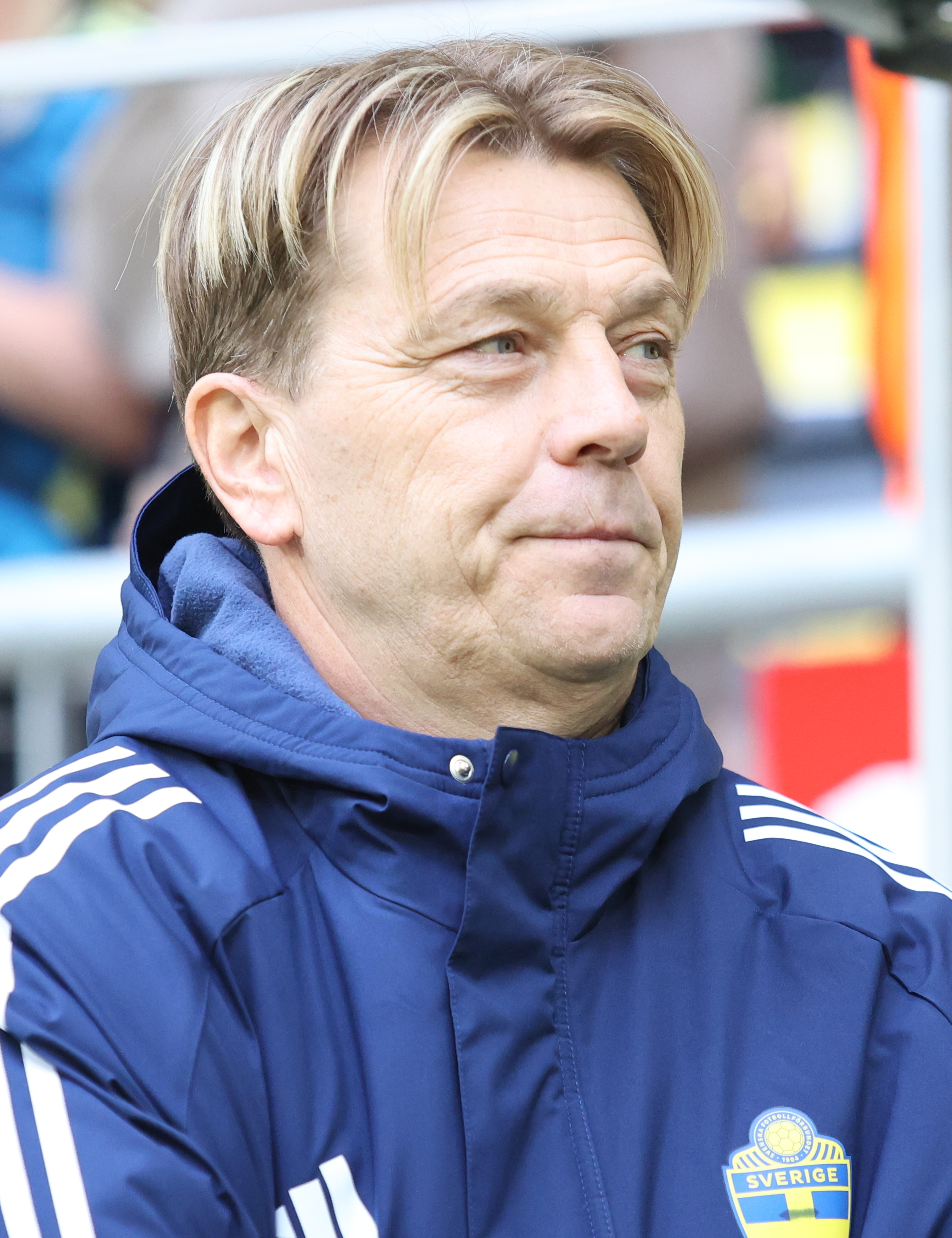
- Gustavsson with Sweden in 2026

Personal information
- Date of birth: 14 August 1973 (age 53)
- Place of birth: Sundsvall, Sweden
- Position: Forward

Youth career
- –1988: Söröje IF

Senior career*
Years	Team	Apps	(Gls)
1989–1993	IFK Sundsvall		
1994	Orlando Lions		
1995	Stockviks FF		
1996	FC Café Opera		
1997–1998	Ytterhogdals IK		
1999	IK Brage		
2000–2003	Ytterhogdals IK		
2004	Degerfors IF		
2005	Åtorps IF		

Managerial career
- 2000–2003: Ytterhogdals IK
- 2004: Degerfors IF (assistant)
- 2005: Degerfors IF
- 2006–2009: Hammarby IF
- 2010: Kongsvinger IL
- 2012: United States women (assistant)
- 2012–2014: Tyresö FF
- 2014–2019: United States women (assistant)
- 2019: GIF Sundsvall
- 2020: Hammarby IF (first-team coach)
- 2020–2024: Australia women
- 2025–: Sweden women
- * Club domestic league appearances and goals

Tony Gustavsson (born 14 August 1973) is a Swedish professional football manager and former player who is the head coach of the Sweden women's national team.

He is best known for his managerial success in women's football, leading Tyresö FF to the 2014 UEFA Women's Champions League Final, helping the United States women's national team to two world championships in 2015 and 2019 as an assistant, as well as helping Australia (nicknamed the "Matildas") to their highest finishes at the Olympic Games in 2020 and the FIFA Women's World Cup in 2023 on home soil. However, the Matildas' poor performance after the 2024 Summer Olympics reportedly led to Gustavsson being fired.

== Playing career ==
Gustavsson started his football career with Söröje IF and played senior football between 1989 and 2005 with IFK Sundsvall, Orlando Lions, Stockviks FF, FC Café Opera, Ytterhogdals IK, IK Brage, Ytterhogdals IK, Degerfors IF, and Åtorps IF. His stints with IFK Sundsvall and Brage were both in the Swedish second-tier Division 1.

== Managerial career ==
=== Early career in men's football ===
Gustavsson first managed Degerfors IF. He was then in charge of Hammarby IF from 2006 but was sacked when the club was relegated from the top flight in 2009.

On 27 April 2010, Gustavsson signed a 44-day contract with the Norwegian Tippeliga-club Kongsvinger IL, but he decided later on to stay till the end of the season. After being relegated with Kongsvinger, Gustavsson did not use his option to extend his contract by one year, and left the club.

=== Tyresö FF ===
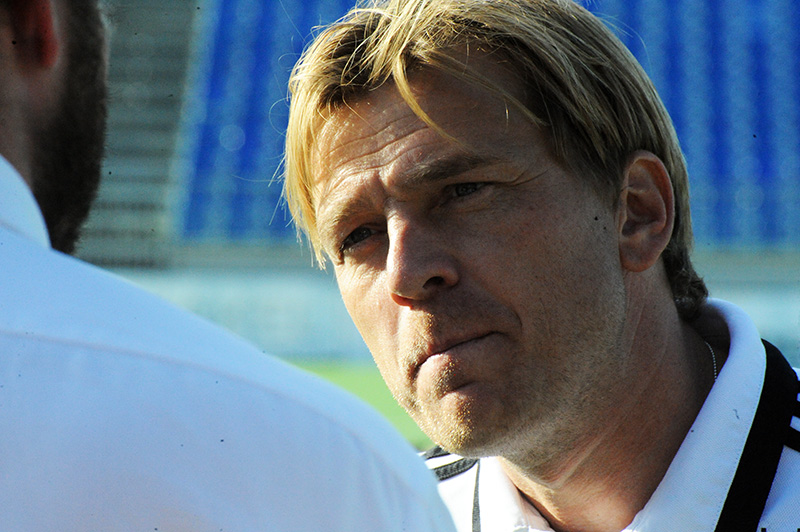
Gustavsson in 2014

Under Gustavsson's leadership Tyresö FF won their first Damallsvenskan title in 2012, after a dramatic last day win over rivals Malmö. Madelaine Edlund scored the winning goal after Caroline Seger's shot had hit the post.

Gustavsson also led Tyresö to a 4–3 defeat by Wolfsburg in the 2014 UEFA Women's Champions League Final. Tyresö became insolvent in 2014 and were kicked out of the 2014 Damallsvenskan season, expunging all their results and making all their players free agents. The Stockholm County Administrative Board published the employees' salaries, showing Gustavsson was among the higher earners at 75,000 Swedish krona (€8,243) per-month.

=== United States women ===
In April 2012, Gustavsson joined the United States women's national team as an assistant coach to compatriot Pia Sundhage, where he helped the United States women's national team to an Olympic gold medal that year. He stayed under the new coach Jill Ellis, and helped the United States women's national team to two world championships in 2015 and 2019 as an assistant.

=== Australia women ===
On 29 September 2020, he joined Australia women's national team, the Matildas, as the head coach. His first major tournament as manager of the Matildas was the 2020 Summer Olympics, which saw Australia finish fourth, which was the joint best ever finish at the Olympics by an Australian football team, male or female.

After a slow start where many were unhappy with the performance of the side, Gustavsson had them peaking for the 2023 FIFA Women's World Cup.

At the World Cup, the Matildas started slow, narrowly defeating Ireland 1–0 and losing to Nigeria 3–2. The team turned it around, defeating Olympic champions Canada to top their group, followed by victories over Denmark and France to reach the semifinals of the World Cup for the first time. However, the Matildas were defeated by England 3–1 at the semifinal, and then 2–0 by Sweden, to finish in 4th place; this was an Australian football team's highest finish at a FIFA World Cup, male or female. He was not be offered another contract however, after the Matildas' poor performances at the 2024 Summer Olympics and being eliminated at the group stage.

=== Sweden women ===
On 6 February 2025, it was announced that Gustavsson had signed a four-year contract to become the next head coach of the Sweden women's national team. Gustavsson joined the team after the conclusion of UEFA Women's Euro 2025. On 8 June 2025, Johanna Almgren was announced as his assistant coach.

== Personal life ==
Gustavsson has a domestic partner and the couple have two children. He also has a sister.

== Managerial statistics ==
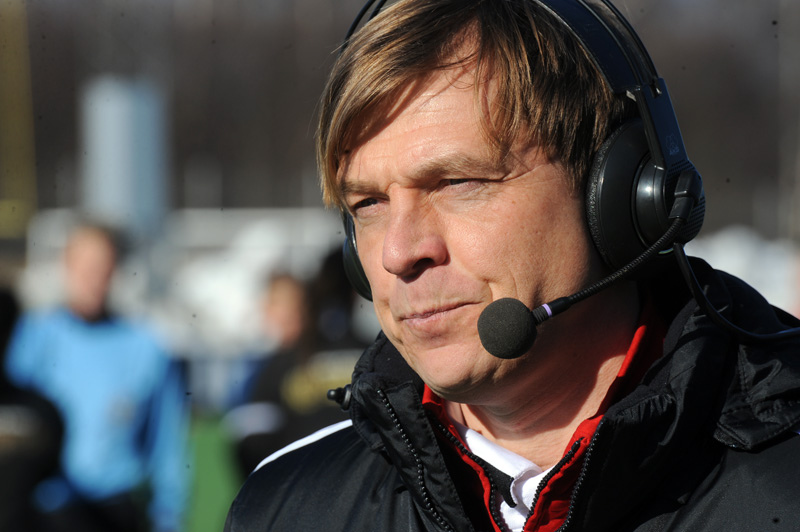
Gustavsson in 2013

As of 1 August 2024

Team	Year(s)	P	W	D	L	Win %
Tyresö FF	2013/14	9	5	3	1	55.56
GIF Sundsvall	2019	8	2	2	4	25.00
Australia women's national	2020 Olympics	6	2	1	3	33.33
Australia women's national	2021 international friendlies	10	1	3	6	10.00
Australia women's national	2022 international friendlies	10	6	1	3	60.00
Australia women's national	2022 AFC Women's Asian Cup	4	3	0	1	75.00
Australia women's national	2023 international friendlies	3	2	0	1	66.67
Australia women's national	2023 FIFA Women's World Cup	7	3	1	3	42.86
Australia women's national	2024 Olympic qualifiers R2	3	3	0	0	100.00
Australia women's national	2023 international friendlies	2	0	0	2	0.00
Australia women's national	2024 Olympic Qualifiers R3	2	2	0	0	100.00
Australia women's national	2024 international friendlies	3	2	1	0	66.67
Australia women's national	2024 Olympics	3	1	0	2	33.33
Australia women's national	Total Australia	59	30	7	22	50.85
Total		76	37	12	27	48.68
