= Women's Professional Soccer All-Star Game =

- Founded: 2009
- Region: Women's Professional Soccer (CONCACAF)
- Teams: 2
- Most championships: (United States) WPS All-Stars, (Brazil) Marta's XI (1 time)
- Broadcaster: Fox Soccer Channel
- WPS All-Star 2010

The WPS All-Star Game was founded in the league's inaugural season, originally modeled after the MLS All-Star Game, where the WPS All-Star team play against a club team from a level-one league from another country, though this changed as of the second year to feature two teams of WPS All-Star players.

WPS All-Stars are chosen either by being voted on to the starting eleven(s), or by being selected by the league. Voting is equally weighted between fans, media, players, and coaches (25% each), while the 'at-large' selections are chosen by the WPS Commissioner, currently Anne-Marie Eileraas. The All-Star head coach(es) are chosen by the players.

== History ==
=== 2009 ===
The inaugural WPS All-Star game, held in St. Louis, was won by the WPS All-Stars 4-2, after falling 0-2 to Umeå IK by the 17th minute. Both teams were missing multiple players, because the EURO was taking place at the same time. WPS in fact had 20 players in the game, as two ex-Umeå players (Östberg and Frisk) suited up for their former team. Marta, also an ex-Umeå player, was incredibly impressive the whole game, notching one goal and two assists for WPS, apart from constantly making fast runs and drawing multiple defenders.

=== 2010 ===
During the off-season, it was decided that the 2010 All-Star game would take place mid-season instead of postseason, the date set to June 30, and held in Atlanta. Instead of facing a club team from another country's league, there were two teams of WPS All-Stars. In a novel process, Abby Wambach and Marta were elected team captains by the voting process, and were allowed to choose their teammates in a playground pick-'em style. Marta's XI defeated Abby's XI by a score of 5-2 (HT 3-1).

=== 2011 ===
Due to the 2011 FIFA Women's World Cup, the All-Star game was not held after the 2011 season. The new commissioner Anne-Marie Eileraas (who took over for Tonya Antonucci after the 2010 WPS final) cited that the likely All-Star players will already be stretched thin with national team duties.

== Results ==
Year	Date	Winning team	Score	Losing team	Stadium	City	Attendance
2009	8/30	WPS All-Stars	4 - 2	Umeå IK	Soccer Park	Fenton, Missouri	4,115
2010	6/30	Marta's XI	5 - 2	Abby's XI	KSU Soccer Stadium	Kennesaw, Georgia	4,610

== Records ==
- Most All-Star goals: Marta and Christine Sinclair (3)
- Most All-Star assists: Marta and Cristiane (2)
- Biggest Win: Three goals, Marta's XI 5-2 Abby's XI (2010)
- Highest attendance: 4610
- Average attendance: 4363
