= Kateryna Monzul =

Ukrainian football referee (born 1981)

Kateryna Monzul Катерина Монзуль
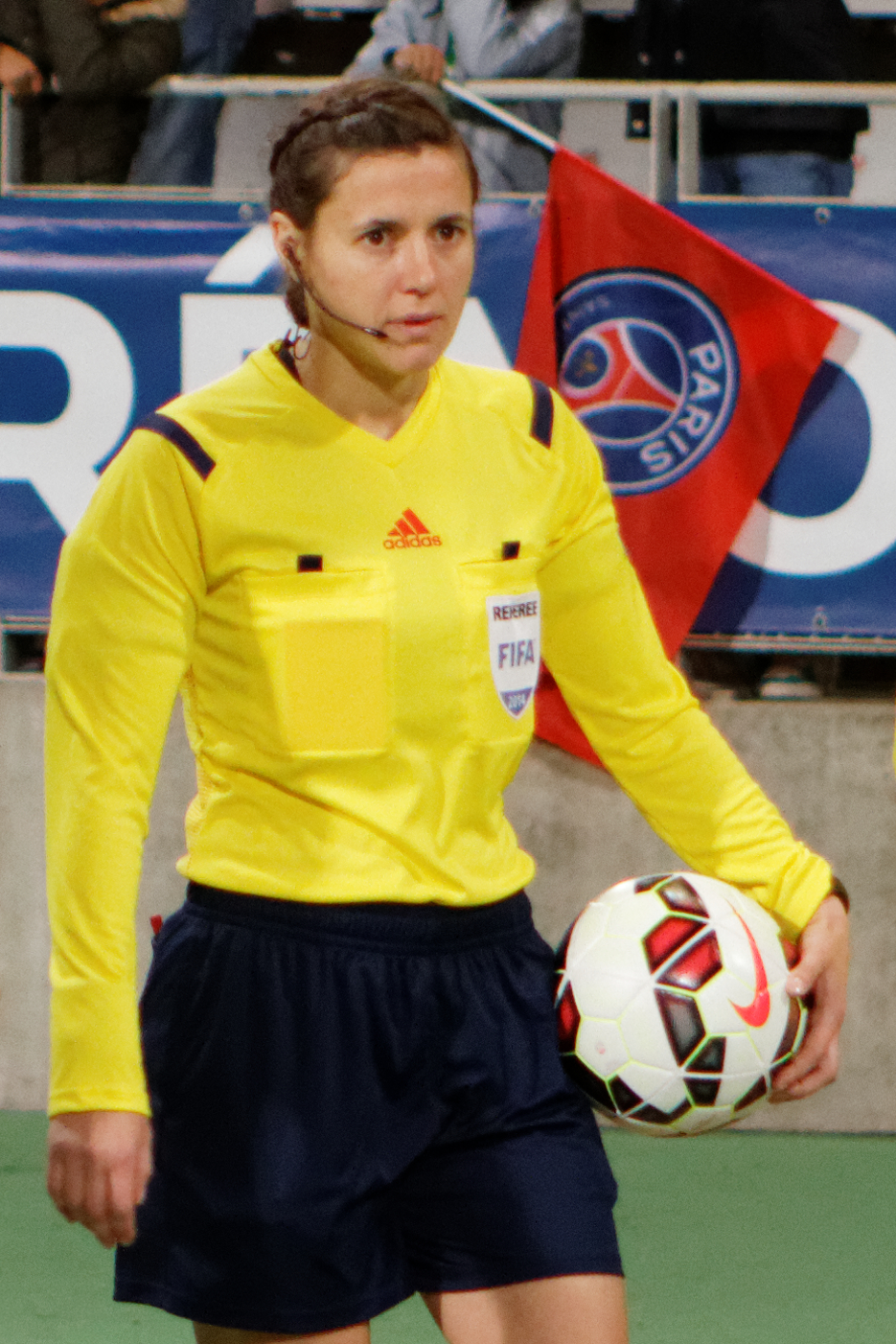
- Full name: Kateryna Volodymyrivna Monzul
- Born: 5 July 1981 (age 45); Kharkiv, Ukrainian SSR (now Ukraine)

Domestic
Years	League	Role
2011–	Ukrainian First League	Referee
2016–	Ukrainian Premier League	Referee

International
Years	League	Role
2004–	FIFA listed	Referee

Kateryna Volodymyrivna Monzul (Ukrainian: Катерина Володимирівна Монзуль; born 5 July 1981) is a Ukrainian football referee. She was the referee for the 2015 FIFA Women's World Cup Final.

== Biography ==
Monzul speaks fluent English, and has a degree in architecture and town planning from Kharkiv National Academy of Urban Economy. She took charge of her first international match in September 2005, Finland versus Poland in the 2007 FIFA Women's World Cup qualifiers. She first refereed in a final tournament at UEFA Women's Euro 2009, while at the 2011 World Cup she served as a fourth official.

The 2013 UEFA Women's Euro's Norway versus Denmark semi-final marked her first performance in a major nations tournament's final stages. The following year she refereed the 2014 UEFA Women's Champions League final. In 2014, she was voted second in the International Federation of Football History & Statistics (IFFHS) World's Best Woman Referee poll behind Bibiana Steinhaus.

Monzul refereed the opening match of the 2015 FIFA Women's World Cup, marking her debut in the competition as main referee, in which she awarded a controversial injury time penalty kick to host nation Canada who scored to beat China 1–0. She also refereed the final on 5 July 2015 between the United States and Japan. In 2015, she was named as the IFFHS World's Best Woman Referee.

On 3 April 2016, Monzul started working in the Ukrainian Premier League, in a match between Chornomorets Odesa and Volyn Lutsk. In doing so, she became the first female referee in the elite men's Ukrainian football division.

In June 2017, Monzul was appointed to be an official at the UEFA Women's Euro 2017 in the Netherlands.

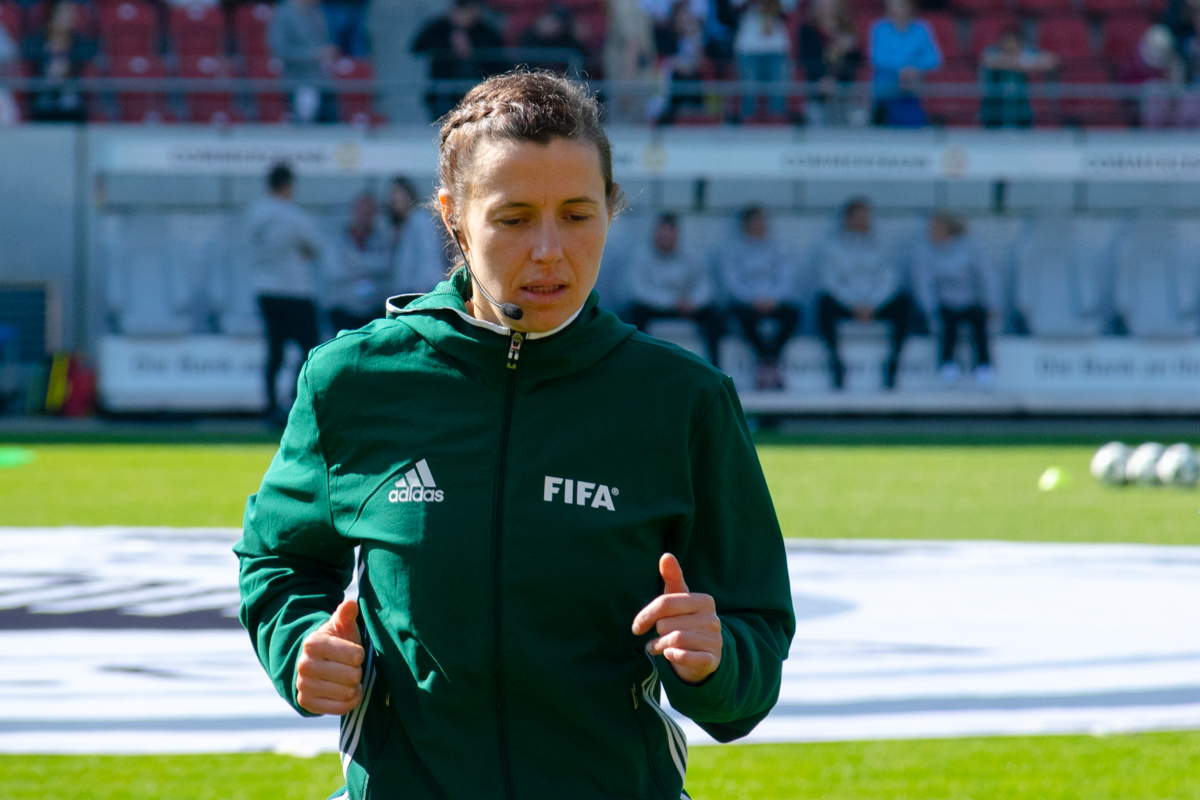
Kateryna Monzul during her warm-up before Germany vs Czech Republic (2018)

On 3 December 2018, it was announced that Monzul had been appointed to be a referee for the 2019 FIFA Women's World Cup in France. After the conclusion of the round of 16, FIFA announced that Monzul was selected as one of 11 referees who would be assigned to matches during the final 8 matches of the tournament.

In November 2020, she officiated the UEFA Nations League match between San Marino and Gibraltar as part of the first all-female refereeing team to take charge of a senior men's international. In December 2020, Monzul, Maryna Striletska and Oleksandra Ardasheva became the first all-women's officiating team in a men's UEFA match when they took charge of a UEFA Europa League match between K.A.A. Gent and FC Slovan Liberec.

In February 2022 Monzul fled her home country of Ukraine after the Russian invasion.

On 31 July 2022, she refereed the Women's Euro final at Wembley Stadium. The match was won by England, defeating Germany 2-1 after extra time.

On 9 January 2023, FIFA appointed her to the officiating pool for the 2023 FIFA Women's World Cup in Australia and New Zealand.

=== Personal trivia ===
Monzul is 167 cm (5 ft 5 1/2 in) tall.

== List of major matches refereed ==
=== Club finals ===
Date	Match	Tournament	Venue	Result	Ref
22 May 2014	Tyresö FF vs. VfL Wolfsburg	2014 UEFA Women's Champions League final	Estádio do Restelo, Lisbon	3–4	

=== International competition record ===
- Teams in **bold** progressed past the stage

Women's national teams
Competition	Qualifiers	Group stage	Round of 16	Quarterfinals	Semifinals	Final
(China) **2007 FIFA World Cup**	Finland 3–1 Poland; Belarus 1–2 Iceland					
(Finland) **2009 UEFA Euro**	Serbia 0–8 **France**; Austria 0–4 **Norway**; **Italy** 3–0 Hungary	**Germany** 5–1 **France**; **Sweden** 1–1 **England**				
(Germany) **2011 FIFA World Cup**	Israel 1–2 Switzerland; Finland 4–1 Portugal; **France** 0–0 Italy; Italy 1–0 Switzerland					
(Sweden) **2013 UEFA Euro**	Belgium 0–1 **Norway**; **Spain** 2–2 **Germany**; Czech Republic 0–2 **Denmark**; Bosnia-Herzegovina 0–2 Poland	**Spain** 3–2 England; **Denmark** 1–1 Finland			**Norway** 1–1 Denmark (4–2 p aet)	
(Canada) **2015 FIFA World Cup**	**Sweden** 2–0 Poland; **Spain** 2–0 Italy; **Netherlands** 1–1 Belgium; **Switzerland** 3–0 Iceland; Austria 3–1 Finland; **Germany** 2–0 Republic of Ireland; Scotland 1–2 **Netherlands**	**Canada** 1–0 **China PR**; **United States** 1–0 Nigeria		**Japan** 1–0 Australia		**United States** 5–2 Japan
(Netherlands) **2017 UEFA Euro**	**Sweden** 1–0 **Denmark**; Romania 1–1 **Portugal** (aet)	**Denmark** 1–0 Belgium; **Germany** 2–1 Italy; **England** 2–1 Portugal			**Denmark** 0–0 Austria (3–0 p aet)	
(France) **2019 FIFA World Cup**	Republic of Ireland 0–2 **Norway**; **Germany** 4–0 Czech Republic; **Spain** 4–0 Austria; **Netherlands** 2–0 Denmark; Panama 1–1 **Argentina**	**Germany** 1–0 **Spain**; **Cameroon** 2–1 New Zealand		France 1–2 **United States**		
(England) **2022 UEFA Euro**	**Finland** 1–0 **Portugal**	**Spain** 4–1 Finland; **Austria** 1–0 Norway		**Sweden** 1–0 Belgium		**England** 2–1 Germany (aet)
(Australia) (New Zealand) **2023 FIFA World Cup**	**England** 1–0 Austria; Wales 0–0 Slovenia; **Portugal** 2–1 Belgium; Senegal 0–4 **Haiti**; Paraguay 0–1 **Panama**	**Netherlands** 1–0 Portugal Panama 0–1 **Jamaica**				

== Honours ==
- IFFHS World's Best Woman Referee: 2015
- Best referee of the Ukrainian Premier League: 2019–20

Preceded by (Romania) Teodora Albon	2014 UEFA Women's Champions League Final (Ukraine) Kateryna Monzul	Succeeded by (Switzerland) Esther Staubli
Preceded by (Germany) Bibiana Steinhaus	2015 FIFA Women's World Cup Final (Ukraine) Kateryna Monzul	Succeeded by (France) Stéphanie Frappart
Preceded by (Switzerland) Esther Staubli	2022 UEFA Women's Euro Final (Ukraine) Kateryna Monzul	Succeeded by (France) Stéphanie Frappart
