= June Pedersen =

Norwegian footballer (born 1985)

Personal information
- Full name: June Renate Pedersen
- Date of birth: 3 April 1985 (age 41)
- Place of birth: Tromsø, Norway
- Position: Defender

Youth career
- Malangshalvøya BK

Senior career*
Years	Team	Apps	(Gls)
- Tromsdalen UIL
–2005	IK Grand Bodø		
2006–2008	Umeå IK	31	(5)
2009–2019	Piteå	191	(34)
2020–2021	Hammarby IF	41	(4)

International career^{‡}
2005–2006	Norway U21	9	(1)
2007–2008	Norway U23	12	(1)
2015	Norway	3	(0)
- Sápmi
- * Club domestic league appearances and goals as of 1 January 2022 ‡ National team caps and goals as of 1 January 2022

June Renate Pedersen (born 3 April 1985) is a Norwegian former footballer who played as a defender. During her career, Pedersen won three caps for the Norway women's national football team.

== Club career ==
In December 2005, Swedish national champions Umeå IK signed Pedersen from Norwegian second tier club IK Grand Bodø. She was a substitute in all four legs of Umeå's UEFA Women's Cup final defeats in 2007 and 2008. She was part of Umeå when the team won the 2007 Swedish Championship. With her playing opportunities decreasing at Umeå, Pedersen moved to Damallsvenskan rivals Piteå in December 2008. Pedersen was part of the Piteå team that won the Swedish Championship in 2018, the first in the club's history. In 2020, after ten years on the team, she left Piteå to join Hammarby Fotboll on a two-year contract with the option of an additional year.

== International career ==
On 17 September 2015, she made her debut for the Norway senior national team during a match against Scotland at the age of 30. A week later, she earned her first start playing in the left-back position against Kazakhstan during Norway's first UEFA Women's Euro 2017 qualifying match. She has also played for the Sápmi women's national football team.
