= Lisa Dahlkvist =

Swedish footballer (born 1987)

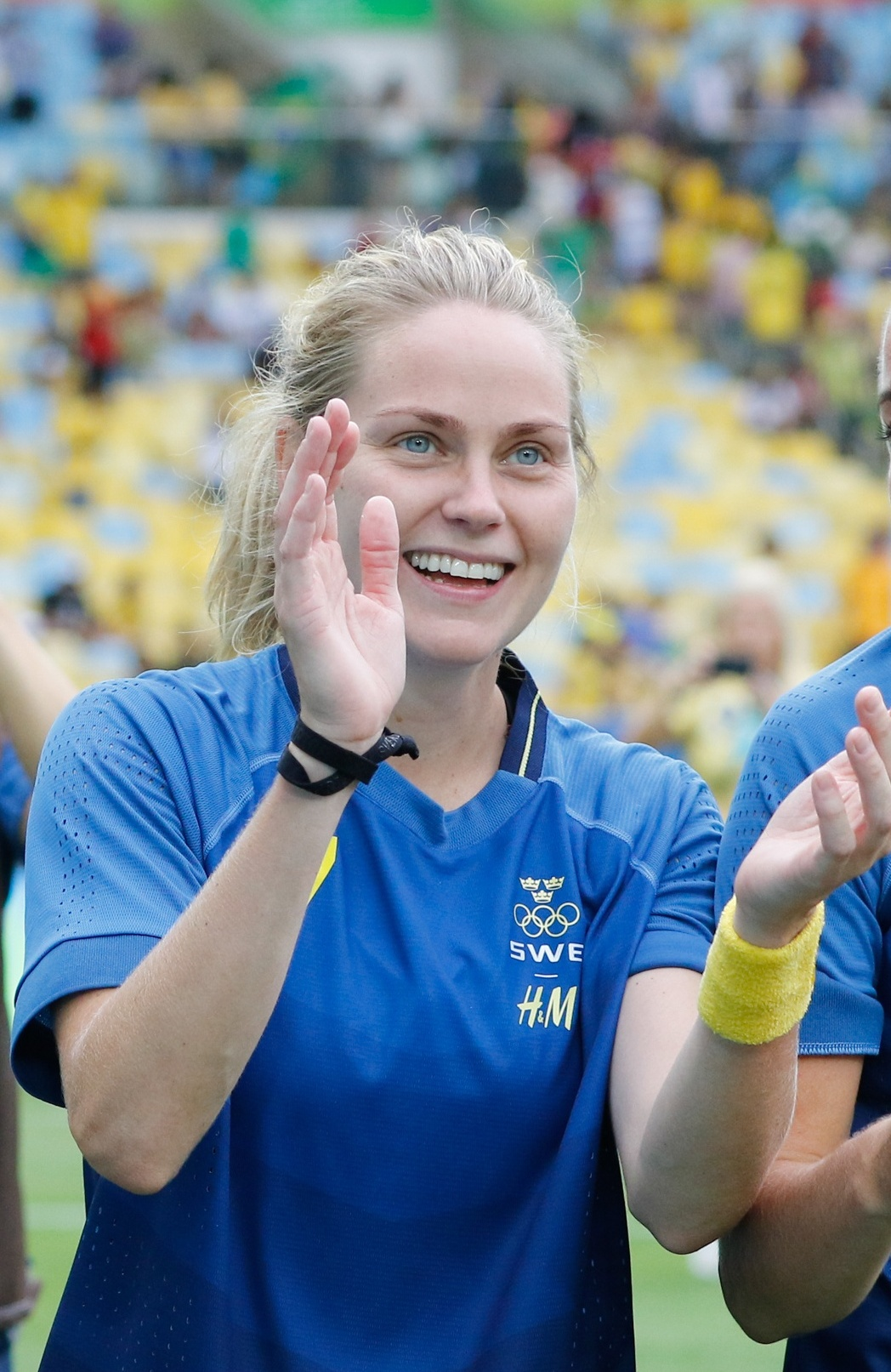
- Dahlkvist representing Sweden in 2016

Personal information
- Full name: Lisa Karolina Viktoria Dahlkvist
- Date of birth: 6 February 1987 (age 39)
- Place of birth: Stockholm, Sweden
- Height: 1.73 m (5 ft 8 in)
- Position: Midfielder

Youth career
- Adolfsbergs IK
- Karlslunds IF

Senior career*
Years	Team	Apps	(Gls)
2005	KIF Örebro		
2006–2009	Umeå IK	22	(4)
2010–2011	Kopparbergs/Göteborg FC	42	(13)
2012–2014	Tyresö FF	44	(5)
2014	Avaldsnes IL	11	(0)
2015	KIF Örebro	9	(6)
2015–2016	Paris Saint-Germain	17	(2)
2016–2017	KIF Örebro	30	(0)
2018–2019	Eskilstuna United	42	(3)
2020–2022	Umeå IK	61	(3)

International career^{‡}
2008–2017	Sweden	132	(11)
Medal record
Women's football
Representing Sweden
FIFA Women's World Cup
Bronze medal – third place	2011 Germany	Team
Olympic Games
Silver medal – second place	2016 Rio de Janeiro	Team
- * Club domestic league appearances and goals as of 21:45, 7 August 2022 (UTC) ‡ National team caps and goals as of 25 July 2017

Lisa Karolina Viktoria Dahlkvist (born 6 February 1987) is a Swedish former professional footballer who played as midfielder. She previously played in the Swedish Damallsvenskan for Umeå IK, Kopparbergs/Göteborg FC, Tyresö FF, and KIF Örebro, in the Norwegian Toppserien for Avaldsnes IL and in the French Division 1 Féminine for Paris Saint-Germain.

Dahlkvist made her Sweden women's national football team debut in 2008 and has accrued more than 130 caps. She represented her country at the 2011 and 2015 FIFA Women's World Cups, the 2012 and 2016 Olympics, as well as the 2009, 2013 and 2017 editions of the UEFA Women's Championship. Her father, Sven "Dala" Dahlkvist, played for AIK and won 39 caps for the Sweden men's team between 1979 and 1985.

== Club career ==
After one season in KIF Örebro's Damallsvenskan team, 18-year-old Dahlkvist signed for national champions Umeå IK in December 2005. She found the adjustment to a higher standard of football difficult and was close to quitting Umeå on several occasions during the first two seasons. After settling into the team Dahlkvist developed into one of Sweden's best central midfielders, winning three Damallsvenskan titles with the club.

Dahlkvist also played in Umeå's two UEFA Women's Cup final defeats in 2007 and 2008. She scored a penalty in the away leg of the 2008 final.

In autumn 2009 Dahlkvist decided to leave Umeå and received offers from leading Damallsvenkan clubs Kopparbergs/Göteborg FC and Linköpings FC. She accepted the offer from Göteborg. When Dahlkvist's contract expired in 2011, Göteborg wanted to keep her, but she was linked with a transfer to league champions Malmö. Instead she decided to join big spending Tyresö FF on a two-year contract.

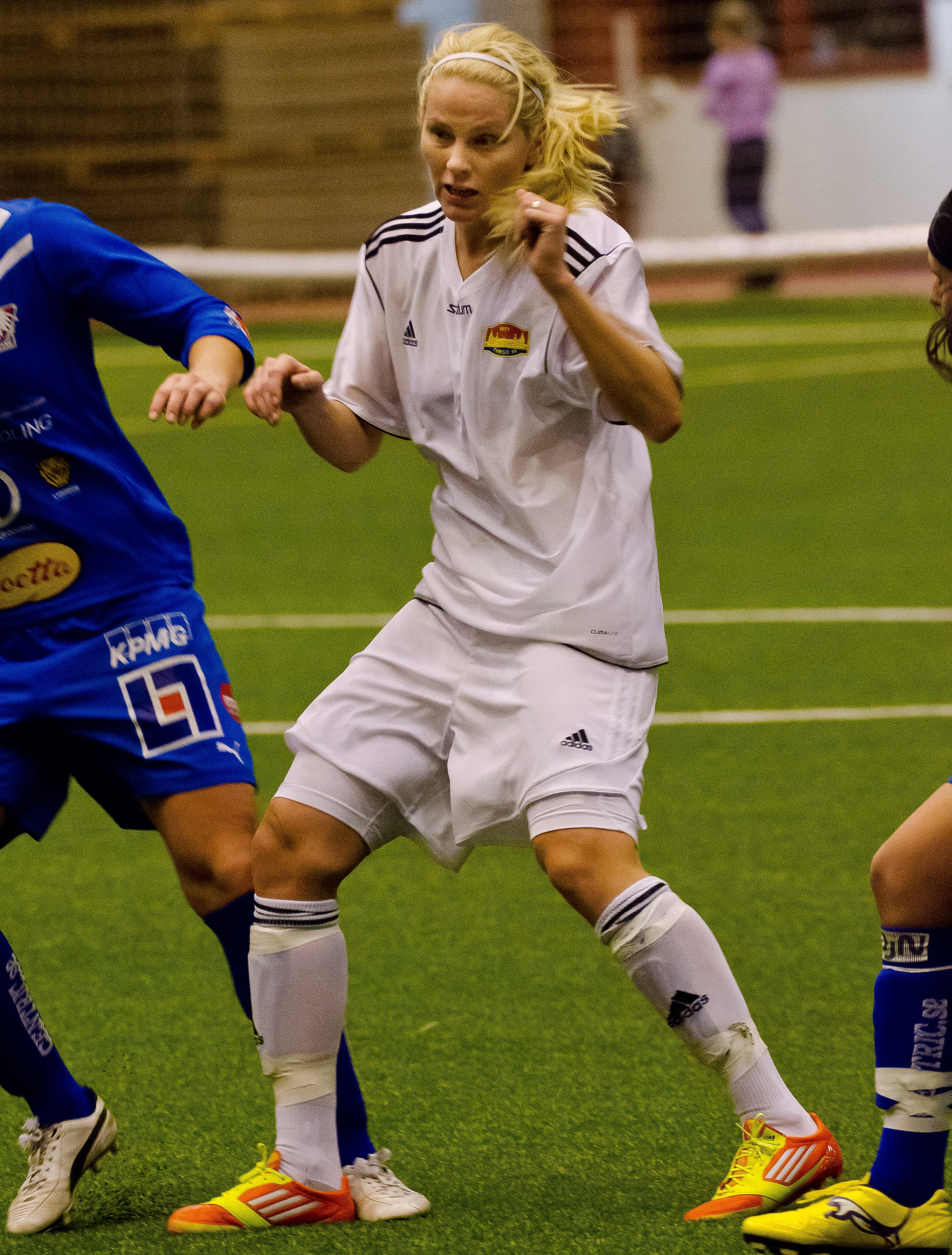
Playing for Tyresö FF in February 2012

Tyresö won the Damallsvenskan title for the first time in the 2012 season and Dahlkvist collected her fourth league winner's medal, in addition to three won with Umeå. Dahlkvist and Tyresö were upset in the final of the Svenska Cupen, by her former club Göteborg who won 2–1 after extra time. Dahlkvist started Tyresö's 4–3 defeat by Wolfsburg in the 2014 UEFA Women's Champions League Final. Her first-half collision with Wolfsburg's Lena Goeßling left the German playing with a bandaged facial injury.

Tyresö suffered a financial collapse in 2014 and withdrew from the 2014 Damallsvenskan season, expunging all their results and making all their players free agents. The Stockholm County Administrative Board published the players' salaries, showing Dahlkvist was one of the higher earners at SEK 39 000 per month.

Former club Umeå were not interested in re-signing Dahlkvist, claiming they already had better players than her. Dahlkvist told the Expressen newspaper that salary was of secondary importance and she was prepared to take a pay cut in order to join the right team. In July 2014 she agreed to join Norwegian Toppserien club Avaldsnes IL, who also made an unsuccessful attempt to sign her former Tyresö teammate Marta.

After the ending of the 2014 season Dahlkvist chose to leave Avaldsnes IL, returning to Sweden's Damallsvenskan and KIF Örebro, the club that she played for at the beginning of her senior career. After just half a season back at Örebro, Dahlkvist moved on again, joining compatriots Caroline Seger and Kosovare Asllani at Paris Saint-Germain Féminine of the French Division 1 Féminine.

== International career ==
Coach Thomas Dennerby gave Dahlkvist her senior Sweden debut on 12 February 2008, a 2–0 win over England in Cyprus. She attended the 2008 Beijing Olympics as one of the squad's reserve players and had been considered for the main squad when the more experienced midfielder Caroline Seger had a pre-tournament injury scare.

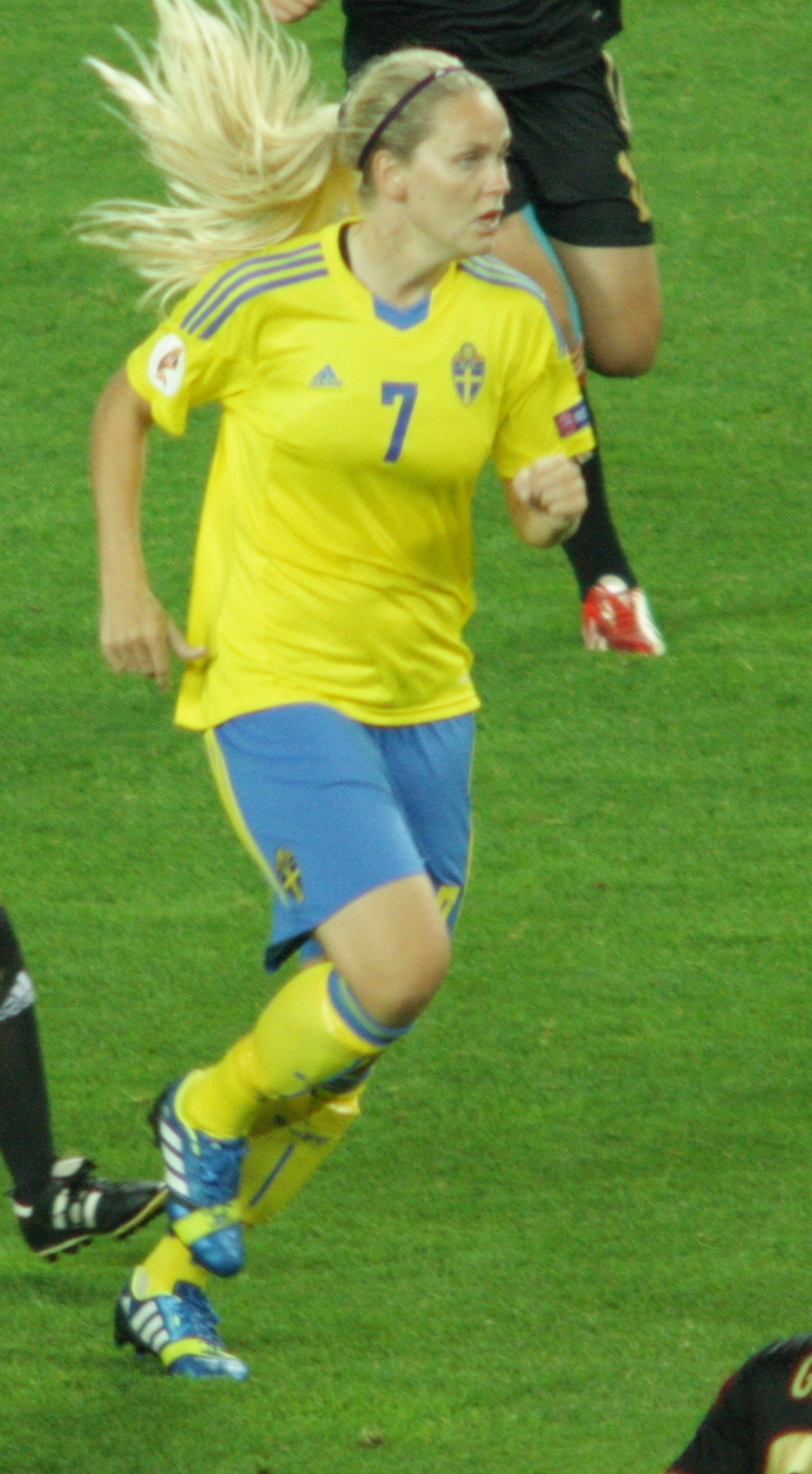
Versus Germany in the UEFA Women's Euro 2013 semi-final

The following year, Dahlkvist was included in the main squad for UEFA Women's Euro 2009 in Finland. She started all three matches and performed well as Sweden topped their group, but was dropped to the substitutes' bench for the 3–1 quarter-final defeat by Norway, making way for Nilla Fischer.

In June 2011 Sweden included Dahlkvist in their squad for the 2011 FIFA Women's World Cup. She was a notable success at the tournament, scoring in three successive games: the only goal in Sweden's second group match against North Korea; putting the Swedes ahead from a penalty kick against the United States; and adding a goal in the 3–1 quarter-final win over Australia. Her three goals led all Swedish players in the tournament.

Sweden finished third after losing their semi-final to Japan in Frankfurt then beating France 2–1 in Sinsheim. Third place in the World Cup also ensured Sweden's qualification for the 2012 Olympic football tournament in England. Dennerby kept Dahlkvist in Sweden's squad for the games, where they lost to France in the quarter-finals. Dahlkvist's form had dipped since the previous year's World Cup.

During the build up to UEFA Women's Euro 2013 in Sweden, Dahlkvist recognised that new coach Pia Sundhage preferred Caroline Seger and Marie Hammarström as the national team's first choice central midfield pairing. Despite questionable fitness Dahlkvist was included in Sweden's squad for the 2015 FIFA Women's World Cup in Canada. Sundhage described the decision as "a gamble" and hoped Dahlkvist could rediscover the excellent form she had shown at the previous World Cup four years earlier. At the finals, Sweden drew all three of their group stage matches against Nigeria, United States, and Australia. They were eliminated in the round of 16 after losing 4–1 to Germany.

Dahlkvist remained with the squad for the 2016 Rio Olympics, where Sweden took home the Silver Medal. Though she did not score during the run of play, she was the final taker for Sweden in penalty shoot-outs in both the Quarter-Final match against the USA and the Semi-Final match against hosts Brazil. Her penalty kicks were successful in both contests.

== Playing style ==
Dahlkvist is a central midfield player whose main strength is her range of passing. UEFA.com wrote that Dahlkvist also reads the game well and takes responsibility during matches, a trait apparent even when she was a youngster. During the 2011 FIFA Women's World Cup, the Dagens Nyheter newspaper described the industrious Dahlkvist as a "tough workhorse in both defence and attack". She is seen as a player who thrives on the big occasion and won praise for calmly converting her 2011 World Cup penalty past the United States' celebrated goalkeeper Hope Solo, a feat she repeated in the Rio Olympics.

== Personal life ==
Dahlkvist is a lesbian and came out publicly in 2008. She's married and has a daughter.

== Career statistics ==
=== International goals ===
No.	Date	Venue	Opponent	Score	Result	Competition
1.	26 February 2010	Municipal Stadium, Vila Real de Santo António, Portugal	Iceland	1–1	5–1	2010 Algarve Cup
2.	26 February 2010	Municipal Stadium, Vila Real de Santo António, Portugal	Iceland	5–1	5–1	2010 Algarve Cup
3.	3 March 2010	Municipal Stadium, Albufeira, Portugal	China	1–0	2–0	2010 Algarve Cup
6.	2 July 2011	Impuls Arena, Augsburg, Germany	North Korea	1–0	1–0	2011 FIFA Women's World Cup
7.	6 July 2011	Volkswagen-Arena, Wolfsburg, Germany	United States	1–0	2–1	2011 FIFA Women's World Cup
8.	10 July 2011	Impuls Arena, Augsburg, Germany	Australia	2–0	3–1	2011 FIFA Women's World Cup
9.	25 July 2012	City of Coventry Stadium, Coventry, England	South Africa	2–0	4–1	2012 Summer Olympics
10.	11 March 2013	Municipal Stadium, Lagos, Portugal	United States	1–0	1–1	2013 Algarve Cup
11.	2 March 2016	Stadion Woudestein, Rotterdam, Netherlands	Norway	1–0	1–0	2016 UEFA Women's Olympic Qualifying Tournament

== Honours ==
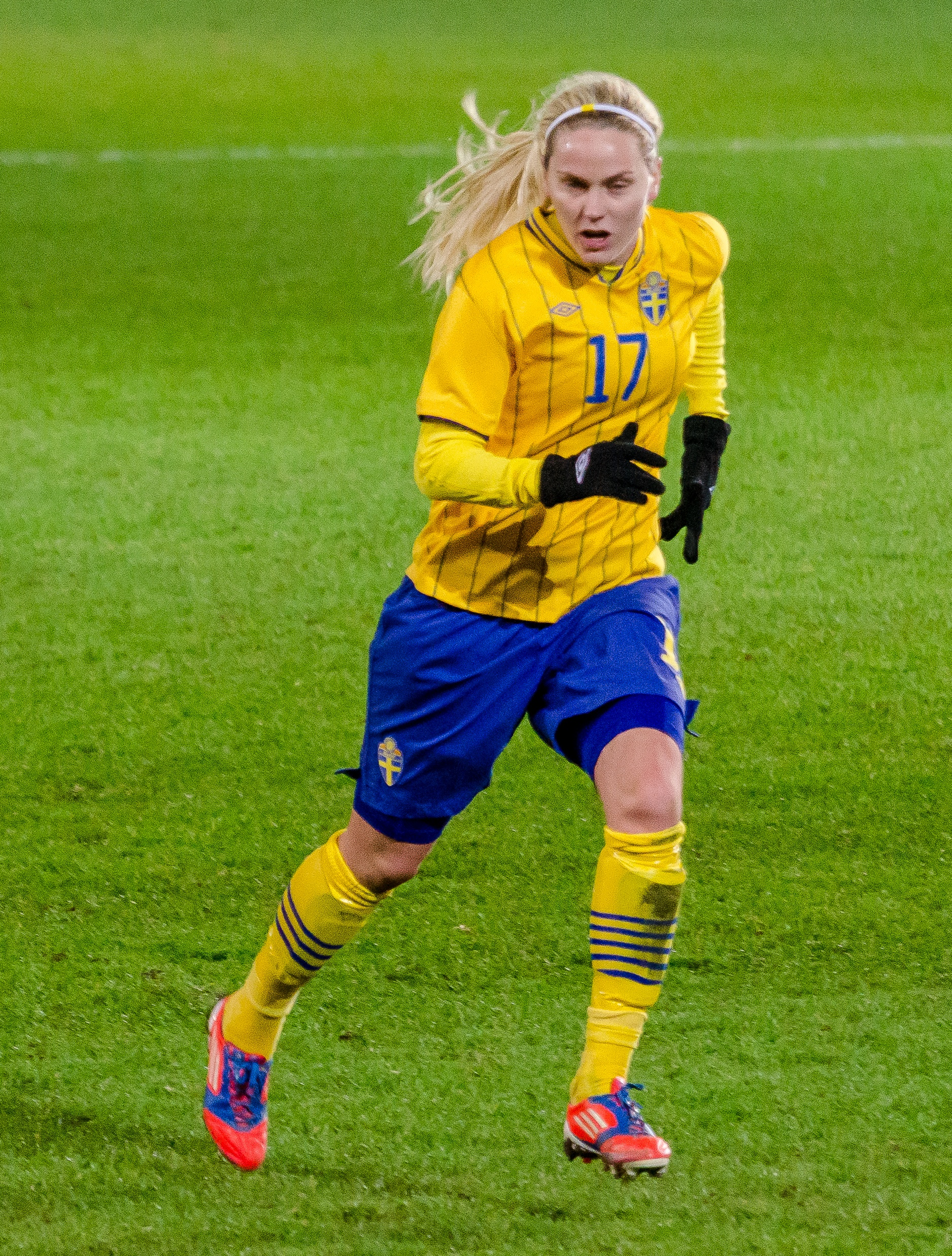
Dahlkvist playing her first game for new coach Pia Sundhage at Växjö's Myresjöhus Arena

Umeå IK

- Damallsvenskan: Winner 2006, 2007, 2008
- Svenska Cupen: Winner 2007
- Svenska Supercupen: Winner 2007, 2008

Kopparbergs/Göteborg FC

- Svenska Cupen: Winner 2011

Tyresö FF

- Damallsvenskan: Winner 2012

Sweden

- FIFA Women's World Cup Third place: 2011
- Summer Olympic Games: Silver Medal, 2016
