= 2014 UEFA Women's Champions League final =

2014 UEFA Women's Champions League Final
- Event: 2013–14 UEFA Women's Champions League
Tyresö FF	VfL Wolfsburg
(Sweden)	(Germany)
3	4
- Date: 22 May 2014
- Venue: Estádio do Restelo, Lisbon
- Referee: Kateryna Monzul (Ukraine)
- Attendance: 11,217
- Weather: Partly cloudy, 18°C

The 2014 UEFA Women's Champions League Final was the final match of the 2013–14 UEFA Women's Champions League, the 13th season of the UEFA Women's Champions League football tournament and the fifth since it was renamed from the UEFA Women's Cup. The match was held at Estádio do Restelo in Lisbon on 22 May 2014. Reigning champions Wolfsburg played Champions League debutants Tyresö in the final and successfully defended their title.

Wolfsburg played the final for the second consecutive time, while Tyresö managed to reach the final in their first tournament appearance. It also marked the fifth time that a Swedish and a German club meet in the final.

== Route to the final ==
Tyresö		Round	Wolfsburg
Opponent	Result	2013–14 UEFA Women's Champions League	Opponent	Result
(France) Paris Saint-Germain	2–1, 0–0	Round of 32	(Estonia) Pärnu	13–0, 14–0
(Denmark) Fortuna Hjørring	4–0, 2–1	Round of 16	(Sweden) Malmö	3–1, 2–1
(Austria) Neulengbach	8–1, 0–0	Quarterfinals	(Spain) Barcelona	3–0, 2–0
(England) Birmingham	3–0, 0–0	Semifinals	(Germany) Turbine Potsdam	4–2, 0–0

== Match details ==
22 May 2014
19:30 WEST

Tyresö (Sweden)	3–4	(Germany) Wolfsburg
Marta 28', 56'; Boquete 30'	Report	Popp 47'; Müller 53', 80'; Faißt 68'

Estádio do Restelo, Lisbon
Attendance: 11,217
Referee: Kateryna Monzul (Ukraine)

Tyresö	Wolfsburg

GK	21	(Sweden) Carola Söberg
RB	25	(United States) Meghan Klingenberg		(substituted off) 69'
CB	23	(Sweden) Linda Sembrant
CB	3	(United States) Whitney Engen
LB	5	(Denmark) Line Røddik Hansen
DM	7	(Sweden) Lisa Dahlkvist		(substituted off) 83'
CM	17	(Sweden) Caroline Seger (c)	(yellow card) 79'
CM	9	(Spain) Verónica Boquete
RW	12	(Sweden) Malin Diaz		(substituted off) 67'
LW	10	(Brazil) Marta
CF	13	(United States) Christen Press
Substitutions:
GK	32	(Finland) Tinja-Riikka Korpela
DF	2	(Brazil) Rilany
DF	8	(Brazil) Thaisa		(substituted on) 83'
MF	6	(Sweden) Lisa Klinga		(substituted on) 69'
MF	15	(Sweden) Johanna Rytting Kaneryd
MF	88	(Brazil) Mayara
FW	11	(Sweden) Madelaine Edlund		(substituted on) 67'
Manager:
Tony Gustavsson

GK	1	(Germany) Almuth Schult
RB	2	(Germany) Luisa Wensing
CB	4	(Sweden) Nilla Fischer
CB	27	(Germany) Josephine Henning
LB	20	(Germany) Stephanie Bunte
CM	13	(Germany) Nadine Keßler (c)
CM	28	(Germany) Lena Goeßling	(substituted off) 90+2'
RW	9	(Germany) Anna Blässe
AM	10	(Germany) Selina Wagner	(substituted off) 46'
LW	25	(Germany) Martina Müller
CF	11	(Germany) Alexandra Popp
Substitutions:
GK	29	(Germany) Merle Frohms
DF	16	(Switzerland) Noelle Maritz
DF	17	(Germany) Laura Vetterlein
DF	22	(Germany) Verena Faißt	(substituted on) 46'
MF	18	(Germany) Ivonne Hartmann	(substituted on) 90+2'
FW	23	(Serbia) Jovana Damnjanović
FW	26	(Germany) Conny Pohlers
Manager:
Ralf Kellermann

Assistant referees:
Natalia Rachynska (Ukraine)
Maryna Striletska (Ukraine)
Fourth official:
Kateryna Zora (Ukraine)
Reserve assistant referee:
Olga Almeida (Portugal)

=== Statistics ===
	Tyresö	Wolfsburg
Goals scored	3	4
Total shots	6	11
Shots on target	5	9
Ball possession	47%	53%
Corner kicks	2	0
Fouls committed	9	17
Offsides	1	4
Yellow cards	1	0
Red cards	0	0
