= Estádio do Restelo =

Football stadium in Lisbon, Portugal

Coordinates: 38°42′10″N 9°12′28″W

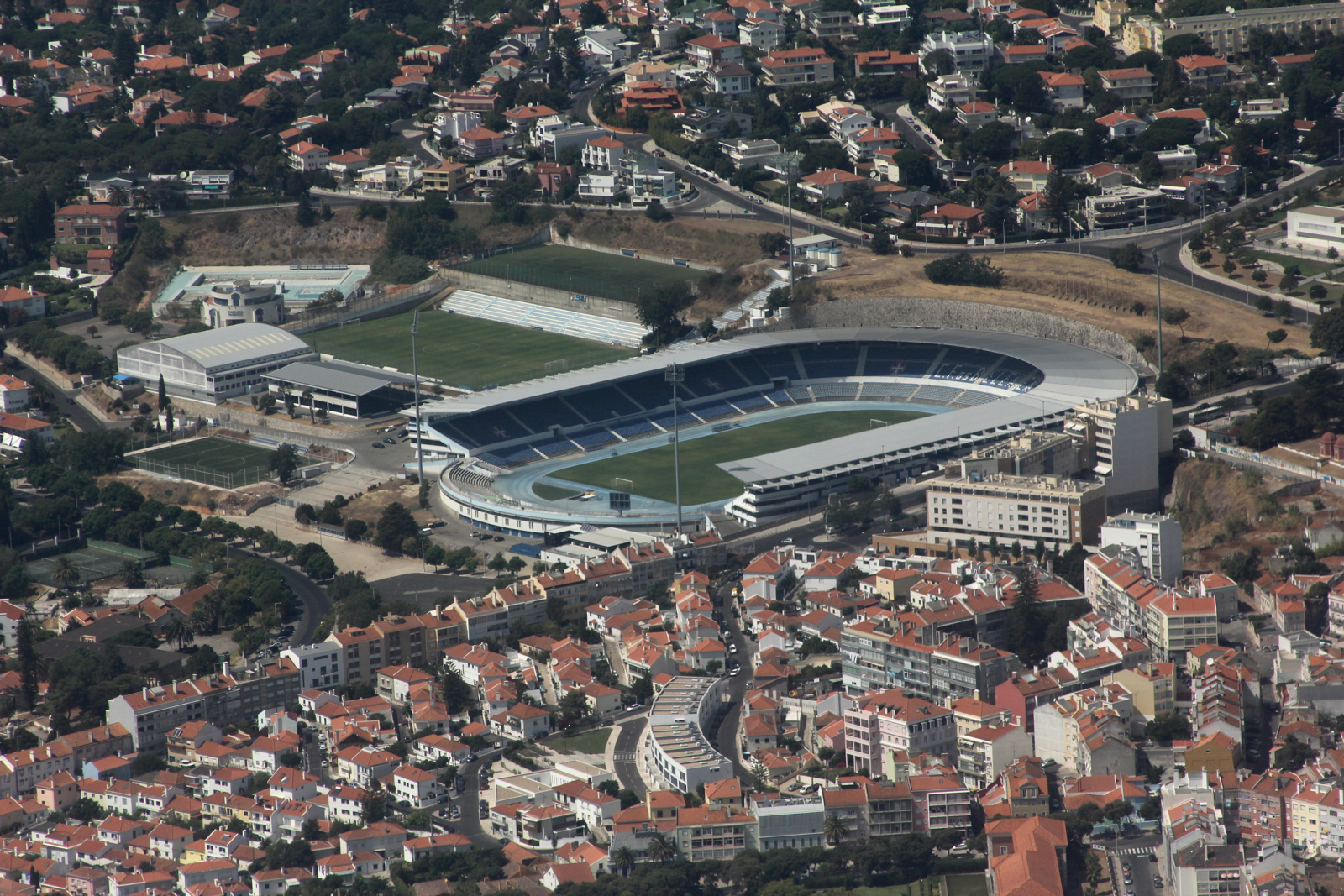
- UEFA
- Interactive map of Estádio do Restelo
- Full name: Estádio do Restelo
- Location: Lisbon, Portugal
- Owner: C.F. Os Belenenses
- Capacity: 19,856
- Surface: Grass
- Record attendance: 60,000 (12 October 1975); Belenenses 4–2 S.L. Benfica
- Field size: 105 x 68 m

Construction
- Built: 1956; 70 years ago
- Opened: 23 September 1956
- Architect: Carvalho de Melo

Tenant
- C.F. Os Belenenses

The Estádio do Restelo (English: Restelo Stadium) is a multi-purpose stadium in Lisbon, Portugal. The stadium has a seated capacity of 19,856 people and was built in 1956, in an old stone quarry. It is situated behind the Jerónimos Monastery in the Lisbon parish of Belém.

It is currently used mostly for football matches, by third division club Clube de Futebol Os Belenenses, but also stages musical performances. The Pope John Paul II has also celebrated a mass there attended by more than 100,000 people.

The inauguration game was against Sporting CP, and Belenenses won by 2–1. The first international match was against Stade de Reims, 2-0 for Belenenses. Finally, the first game counting for the Portuguese First Division was a Belenenses 5-1 Vitória de Setúbal.

== Concert history ==
The stadium can host concerts with standing room, bringing capacity to around 44,000 to 60,000.

On July 6, 1996, AC/DC performed at the stadium during their Ballbreaker World Tour.

On May 23, 2000, American hard rock band Pearl Jam kicked off their Binaural Tour at the stadium, recording a live album of the performance.

On October 4, 2000, The Smashing Pumpkins played in the stadium during the Sacred and Profane Tour.

Queen + Paul Rodgers performed at the stadium during their tour on 2 July 2005, being the first Queen show in Portugal and the first stadium show in 19 years for the band.

On 18 July 2009 The Killers, Duffy, Mando Diao, Brandi Carlile, The Walkmen and Bettershell made the lineup for the Lisbon's 15th edition of Super Bock Super Rock festival, held at the stadium.

On 1 May 2019, Metallica performed at the stadium during their WorldWired Tour.

American rapper Kendrick Lamar and singer-songwriter SZA co-headlined their Grand National Tour at the stadium on July 27, 2025.

Canadian act The Weeknd is scheduled to perform on September 5 and 6, 2026, during the After Hours Til Dawn Tour, with Playboi Carti as support.

Other bands that have headlined the venue include The Police, Xutos & Pontapés, James, Radiohead, and Slipknot.

== UEFA Women's Champions League Final ==
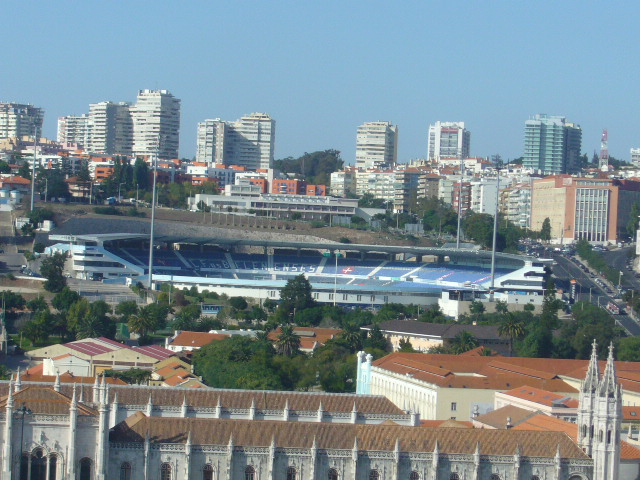
The surroundings behind the stadium

The stadium hosted the 2014 UEFA Women's Champions League Final.

Also in 2019, a solidarity game was played there between the women's team of Benfica and Sporting CP, organised by the Federação Portuguesa de Futebol and Belenenses, with the revenues reverting to Mozambique, after Cyclone Idai. The game established the new record of a women's match in Portugal, having an attendance of 15 000 people.

== Curiosity ==
In 2011, the Portuguese soap opera, "Sedução" produced by TVI told the history of a fictional player of Belenenses and recorded some episodes at the stadium, including during game days.

== Portugal national team matches ==
The following national team matches were held in the stadium.

#	Date	Score	Opponent	Competition
1.	16 December 1962	3–1	Bulgaria	UEFA Euro 1964 Preliminary Round
2.	7 October 1980	1–1	United States	Friendly
3.	23 February 1983	1–0	West Germany	Friendly
4.	6 September 1984	1–0	Bulgaria	Friendly
5.	27 March 1996	1–0	Greece	Friendly
6.	12 October 2002	1–1	Tunisia	Friendly
7.	11 October 2003	5–3	Albania	Friendly

Also, in 2004, the stadium was chosen by the Italy national football team as their headquarters to the UEFA European Championship.

In 2016, the Portugal national football team did its preparation prior to the UEFA European Championship at Restelo too.

Preceded by Stamford Bridge; London	UEFA Women's Champions League; Final venue 2014	Succeeded by Friedrich-Ludwig-Jahn-Sportpark; Berlin
