= Erika Karlsson =

Swedish association football player

Personal information
- Date of birth: 9 July 1987 (age 39)
- Position: Forward

Senior career*
Years	Team	Apps	(Gls)
2005–2007	Umeå IK	21	
2008–2009	Sunnanå SK		
2010–2012	Piteå IF		
- * Club domestic league appearances and goals

Erika Karlsson (born 9 July 1987) is a Swedish retired footballer who played for Umeå IK and Sunnanå SK.
