= Ulla-Karin Rönnlund =

Swedish footballer

Personal information
- Full name: Ulla-Karin Rönnlund
- Date of birth: 19 February 1977 (age 49)
- Place of birth: Härnösand, Sweden
- Height: 1.73 m (5 ft 8 in)
- Position: Goalkeeper

Youth career
- Älandsbro FF

Senior career*
Years	Team	Apps	(Gls)
1996–1997	Bollsta IK		
1998–2001	Umeå IK		
2007–2009	Umeå IK		

International career^{‡}
1998–2009	Sweden	7	(0)
- * Club domestic league appearances and goals ‡ National team caps and goals as of 26 May 2013

Ulla-Karin Rönnlund (née Thelin; born 19 February 1977) is a Swedish former football goalkeeper for Umeå IK in the Swedish Damallsvenskan. She represented Sweden at senior international level.

== Club career ==
After suffering injuries during the 2001 season Rönnlund lost her motivation for football and decided to leave Umeå.

She retired again after the 2009 season, to concentrate on her family. As Söberg also left, Umeå IK signed Caroline Jönsson as a replacement.

== International career ==
Rönnlund started playing for Sweden's national youth teams in 1993. At the 1995 edition of the Albena Cup, Rönnlund was pressed into service as a makeshift forward after a sickness bug swept through the Sweden under-20 squad. She scored the winning goal in the 1–0 final win over Ukraine.

Rönnlund played seven times for Sweden's national team. She made her senior international debut against Norway on 10 October 1998.
