= Elin Landström =

Swedish footballer (born 1992)

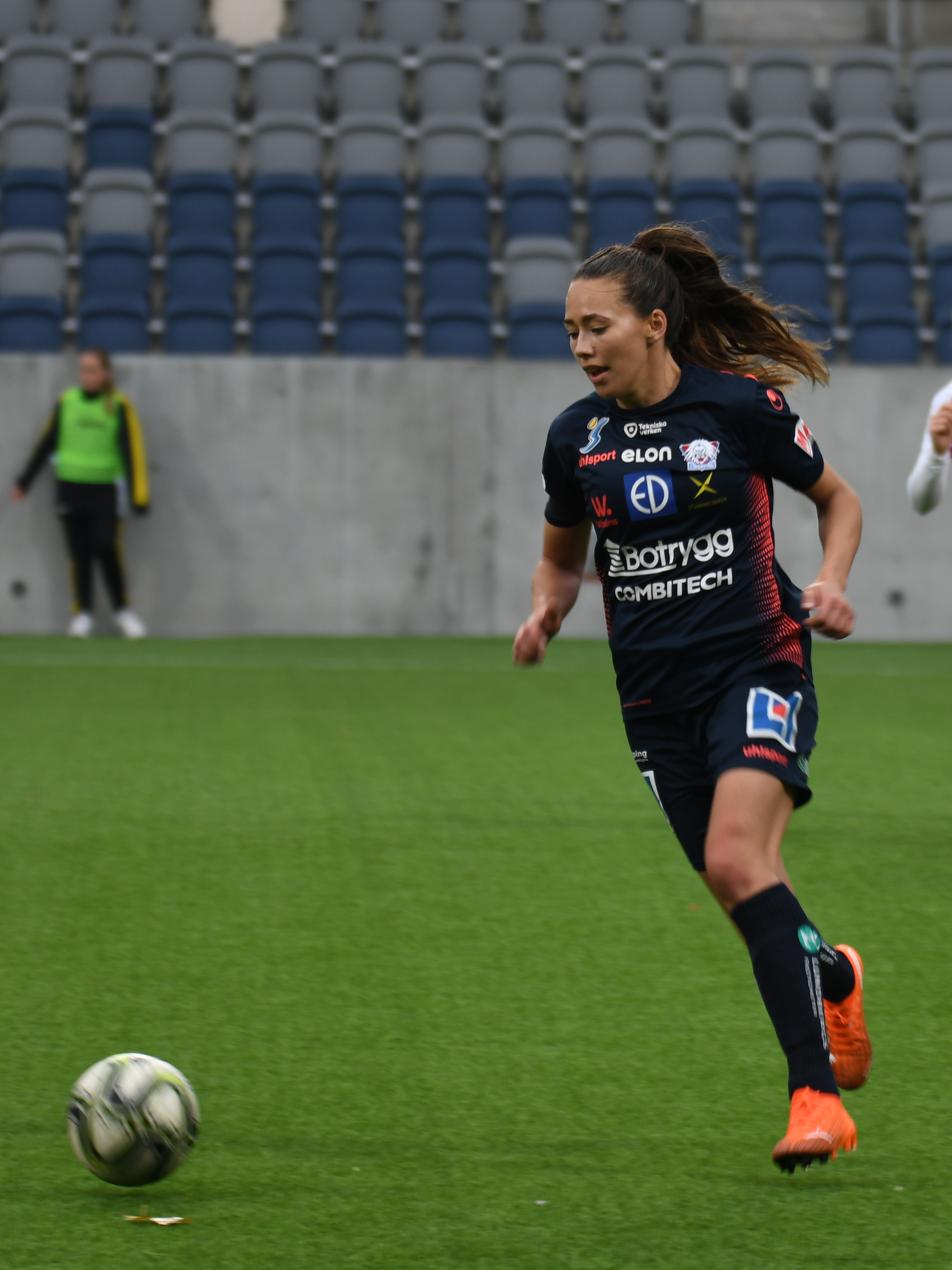
- Landström playing for Linköpings FC in 2020

Personal information
- Full name: Elin Linnéa Landström
- Date of birth: 2 June 1992 (age 34)
- Place of birth: Norrköping, Sweden
- Height: 1.71 m (5 ft 7 in)
- Position: Left back

Senior career*
Years	Team	Apps	(Gls)
2010–2015	Umeå IK	96	(2)
2016–2017	Kopparbergs/Göteborg FC	43	(2)
2018–2021	Linköpings FC	68	(0)
2021–2022	Inter Milan	19	(0)
2022–2023	Roma	10	(0)

International career^{‡}
2010–2011	Sweden U19	4	(0)
- * Club domestic league appearances and goals as of 28 August 2022 ‡ National team caps and goals as of 11:08, 21 March 2015 (UTC)

Elin Linnéa Landström (born 2 June 1992) is a Swedish professional footballer who plays as a left back.

== Club career ==
On 7 July 2022, Landström joined AS Roma.

== Honours ==
AS Roma

- Serie A: 2022–23
- Supercoppa Italiana: 2022
