= Emmelie Konradsson =

Swedish footballer

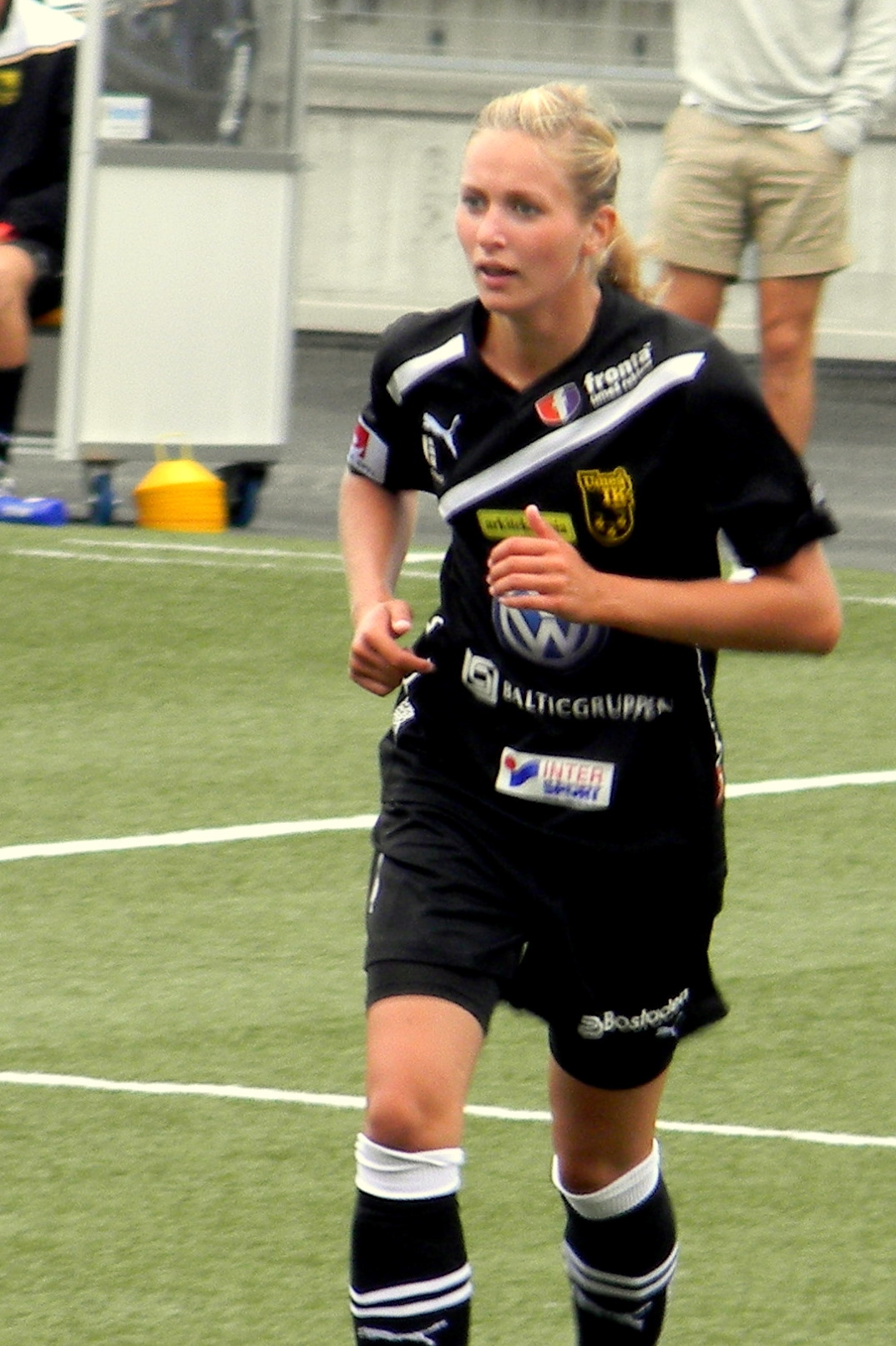

Personal information
- Full name: Emmelie Konradsson
- Date of birth: 9 April 1989 (age 37)
- Height: 1.75 m (5 ft 9 in)
- Position: Midfielder

Youth career
- Umeå Södra FF
- 2004–2006: Umedalens IF

Senior career*
Years	Team	Apps	(Gls)
2007–2014	Umeå IK		

International career^{‡}
2011–2014	Sweden	13	(0)
- * Club domestic league appearances and goals as of 23:59, 3 June 2013 (UTC) ‡ National team caps and goals as of 14:23, 21 July 2015 (UTC)

Emmelie Konradsson (born 9 April 1989) is a Swedish former footballer who played in midfield for Damallsvenskan club Umeå IK and the Sweden women's national football team.

== Club career ==
Konradsson joined Umeå IK in 2007. She extended her contract with the club in January 2013. In December 2014 Konradsson announced her retirement from football aged 25.

== International career ==
Konradsson made her debut for the senior Sweden team in a 2–1 loss to Canada on 22 November 2011.

Konradsson was favoured by coach Pia Sundhage who recalled her to the national team ahead of UEFA Women's Euro 2013. She played on the right wing for a pre tournament friendly with Norway.
