= Emma Berglund =

Swedish footballer (born 1988)

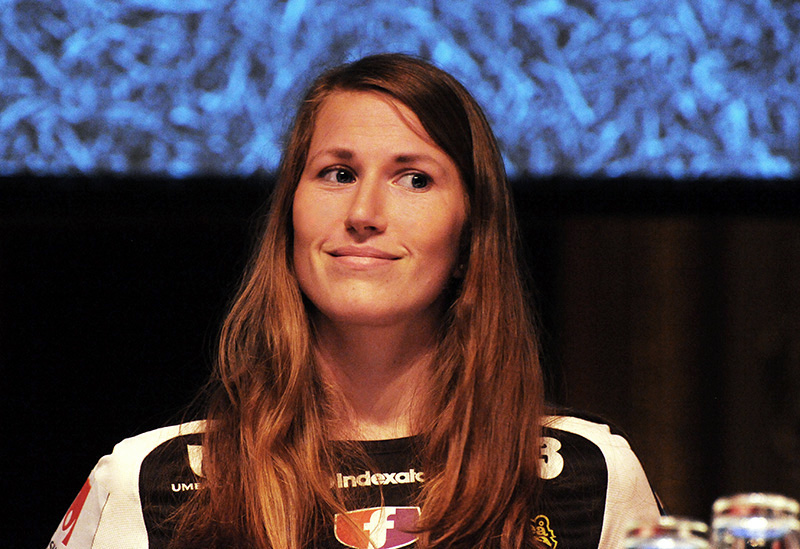

Personal information
- Full name: Emma Sofia Berglund
- Date of birth: 19 December 1988 (age 37)
- Place of birth: Umeå, Sweden
- Height: 1.72 m (5 ft 8 in)
- Position: Defender

Youth career
- Täfteå IK
- Umedalens IF

Senior career*
Years	Team	Apps	(Gls)
2006–2014	Umeå IK	115	(4)
2015–2017	FC Rosengård	55	(3)
2017–2019	Paris Saint-Germain	18	(1)
2019–2020	BK Häcken	19	(0)
2021–2024	FC Rosengård	12	(0)

International career^{‡}
2011–2021	Sweden	58	(1)
Medal record
Olympic Games
Silver medal – second place	2016 Rio de Janeiro	Team
- * Club domestic league appearances and goals as of 28 June 2020 ‡ National team caps and goals as of 12 April 2022

Emma Sofia Berglund (born 19 December 1988) is a Swedish former footballer who played as a defender.

== Club career ==
Berglund joined Umeå IK in 2006 and later captained the team. She left Umeå after the 2014 season to sign with Damallsvenskan champions FC Rosengård in December 2014. She served as their captain from the 2016 season. In July 2017, it was announced that Berglund had signed a two-year contract with Division 1 Féminine team Paris Saint-Germain.

== International career ==
Berglund made her debut for the senior Sweden team in a 1–1 draw with the United States on 20 November 2011.

In June 2012 Berglund was named in the 18–player Sweden squad for the 2012 London Olympics, where she played Sweden's four games. She missed the 2013 European Championship due to an ACL injury sustained in April 2013.

=== International goal ===
Goal	Date	Location	Opponent	Score	Result	Competition
1	2016-06-06	Gothenburg, Sweden	Moldova	6–0	6–0	Euro 2017 qualifying

== Honours ==
=== Club ===
Umeå IK

- Damallsvenskan: 2006, 2007, 2008
- Svenska Cupen: 2007
- Svenska Supercupen: 2007, 2008

FC Rosengård

- Damallsvenskan: 2015
- Svenska Cupen: 2016
- Svenska Supercupen: 2015, 2016

Kopparbergs/Göteborg FC

- Damallsvenskan: 2020

=== International ===
Sweden

- Summer Olympic Games: Silver Medal, 2016
- FIFA Women's World Cup: Bronze Medal, 2019
