= Carola Söberg =

Swedish footballer and coach

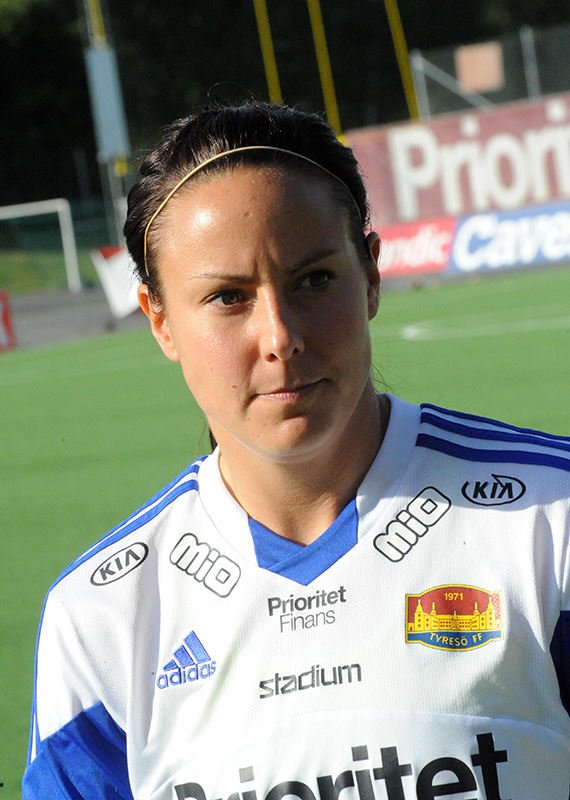
- Söberg in 2014

Personal information
- Full name: Carola Britt Therese Söberg
- Date of birth: 29 July 1982 (age 44)
- Place of birth: Karlstad, Sweden
- Height: 1.72 m (5 ft 8 in)
- Position: Goalkeeper

Youth career
- Sommarro IF
- 1993–1999: QBIK

Senior career*
Years	Team	Apps	(Gls)
1999–2000	QBIK		
2001–2006	Mallbackens IF		
2007–2009	Umeå IK		
2010–2014	Tyresö FF	79	(0)
2014	Avaldsnes IL	6	(0)
2015–2017	KIF Örebro DFF	64	(0)

International career^{‡}
2007–2015	Sweden	11	(0)
- * Club domestic league appearances and goals as of 12:55, 25 June 2015 (UTC) ‡ National team caps and goals as of 16:11, 23 June 2015 (UTC)

Carola Britt Therese Söberg (born 29 July 1982) is a Swedish football coach and former goalkeeper. She played for clubs including Umeå IK, Tyresö FF and KIF Örebro DFF of the Damallsvenskan, as well as Avaldsnes IL of the Norwegian Toppserien. She won 11 caps for Sweden at senior international level.

== Club career ==
At the end of the 2006 season, Everton FC supporter Söberg left Mallbackens IF for reigning league champions Umeå IK.

Tyresö won the Damallsvenskan title for the first time in the 2012 season and Söberg collected her third league winner's medal, in addition to two won with Umeå. Despite the arrival of Tinja-Riikka Korpela, Söberg retained her place and played in Tyresö's 4–3 defeat by Wolfsburg in the 2014 UEFA Women's Champions League Final. When Tyresö FF folded during the 2014 Damallsvenskan season, Söberg signed for Avaldsnes IL of the Norwegian Toppserien.

After the expiry of her six-month contract in Norway, Söberg returned to Sweden with KIF Örebro DFF. She retired from playing after the 2017 Damallsvenskan season, then took a coaching role with Örebro's under-19 team and began working as an agent.

== International career ==
Söberg played seven times for Sweden's national under–21 team. She made her senior international debut against Scotland on 17 February 2007.

== Honours ==
=== Club ===
Umeå IK

- Damallsvenskan (2): Winner 2007, 2008
- Svenska Cupen (1): Winner 2007
- Svenska Supercupen (2): Winner 2007, 2008

Tyresö FF

- Damallsvenskan (1): Winner 2012
