= Johanna Frisk =

Swedish footballer

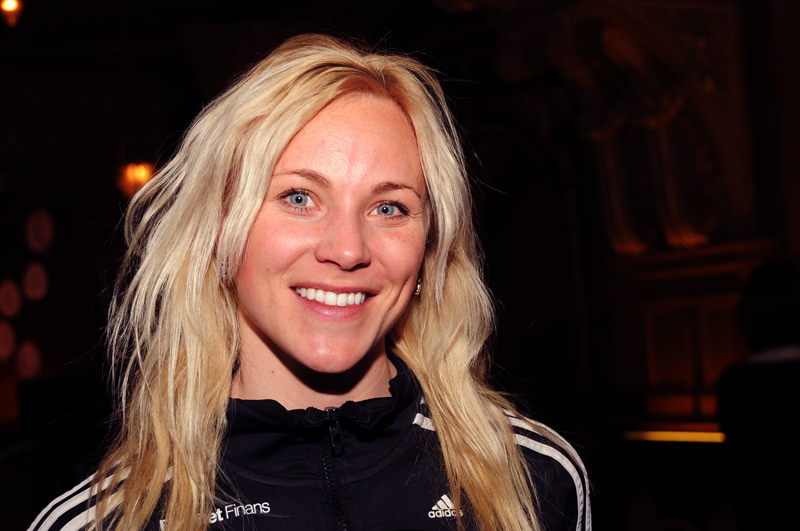

Personal information
- Full name: Johanna Maria Frisk
- Date of birth: 19 March 1986 (age 40)
- Place of birth: Björklinge, Sweden
- Height: 5 ft 7 in (1.70 m)
- Position: Defender

Youth career
- SK Iron

Senior career*
Years	Team	Apps	(Gls)
–2006	Bälinge IF		
2006–2009	Umeå IK		
2009	Los Angeles Sol	1	(0)
2010–2013	Tyresö FF	58	(0)

International career^{‡}
–2008	Sweden U-23	10	
2009–2011	Sweden	3	(0)
- * Club domestic league appearances and goals as of 21:29, 8 January 2014 (UTC) ‡ National team caps and goals as of 21:29, 8 January 2014 (UTC)

Johanna Maria Frisk (born 19 March 1986) is a Swedish former football defender who played for Tyresö FF of the Damallsvenskan for four seasons prior to her retirement in January 2014. She previously played for Umeå IK and in the United States for Los Angeles Sol of Women's Professional Soccer (WPS). Frisk made three appearances for the senior Sweden women's national football team.

Tyresö won the Damallsvenskan title for the first time in the 2012 season and Frisk collected her fourth league winner's medal, in addition to three won with Umeå. She was the team captain, but missed five months of the title-winning season with a meniscus injury. In January 2014, Frisk announced her retirement from football after she failed to overcome another serious knee injury.
