= Madelaine Edlund =

Swedish footballer

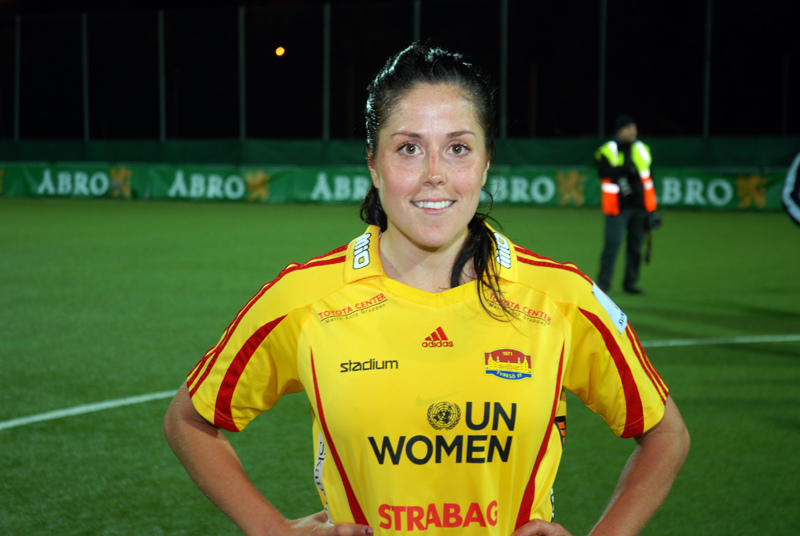

Personal information
- Full name: Madelaine Nathalie Edlund
- Date of birth: 15 September 1985 (age 41)
- Place of birth: Jönköping, Sweden
- Height: 1.69 m (5 ft 7 in)
- Position: Forward

Youth career
- Morön BK

Senior career*
| Years | Team | Apps | (Gls) |
| 2001–2006 | Sunnanå SK | | |
| 2006–2009 | Umeå IK | 133 | (67) |
| 2010 | Saint Louis Athletica | 4 | (0) |
| 2010–2014 | Tyresö FF | 52 | (33) |
| 2014 | Sunnanå SK | | |

International career^{‡}
| 2007–2012 | Sweden | 35 | (2) |
Medal record
Women's football
Representing Sweden
FIFA Women's World Cup
| Bronze medal – third place | 2011 Germany | Team |
- * Club domestic league appearances and goals ‡ National team caps and goals as of 2017

Madelaine Nathalie Edlund (born 15 September 1985) is a Swedish former footballer who played for the Swedish national team and clubs including Umeå, Tyresö and Saint Louis Athletica. Her mother is from Chile.

== Club career ==
During the 2007–2008 UEFA Women's Champions League quarterfinals, Edlund scored twice against FCL Rapide Wezemaal in Umeå IK's 6–0 victory.

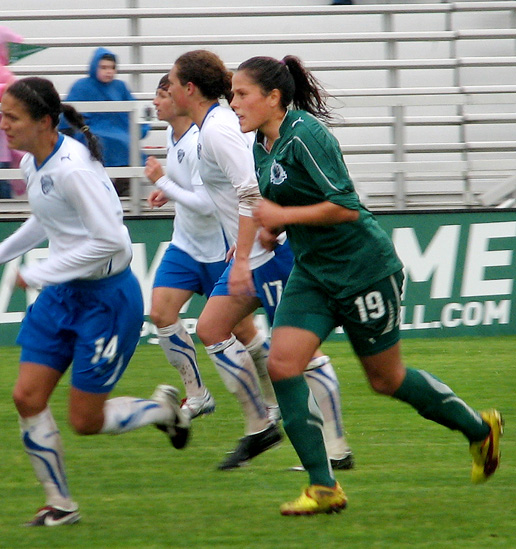
Edlund playing for the Saint Louis Athletica

In 2010 Edlund had a short spell with American Women's Professional Soccer (WPS) club Saint Louis Athletica. She started one game and made three substitute appearances before the team folded.

Edlund collected her third Damallsvenskan title in 2012, after Tyresö's dramatic last day win over Malmö. She scored the winning goal after Caroline Seger's shot had hit the post.

Edlund returned to training with Tyresö FF ahead of the 2014 season, after missing much of the previous campaign due to maternity leave. When Tyresö became insolvent and were kicked out of the league, Edlund rejoined her first senior club Sunnanå SK. In December 2014 she announced her second pregnancy and retirement from football at the age of 29.

== International career ==
Edlund's debut for Sweden was on 30 October 2007 in a game against Denmark, the result was 2–1 in favour of Denmark.

In February 2013, Edlund was ruled out of contention for Sweden's UEFA Women's Euro 2013 squad, due to pregnancy.

== Honours ==
Umeå IK

- Damallsvenskan: Winner 2006, 2007, 2008
- Svenska Cupen: Winner 2007
- Svenska Supercupen: Winner 2007, 2008

Tyresö FF

- Damallsvenskan: Winner 2012
