= Maayke Heuver =

Dutch footballer

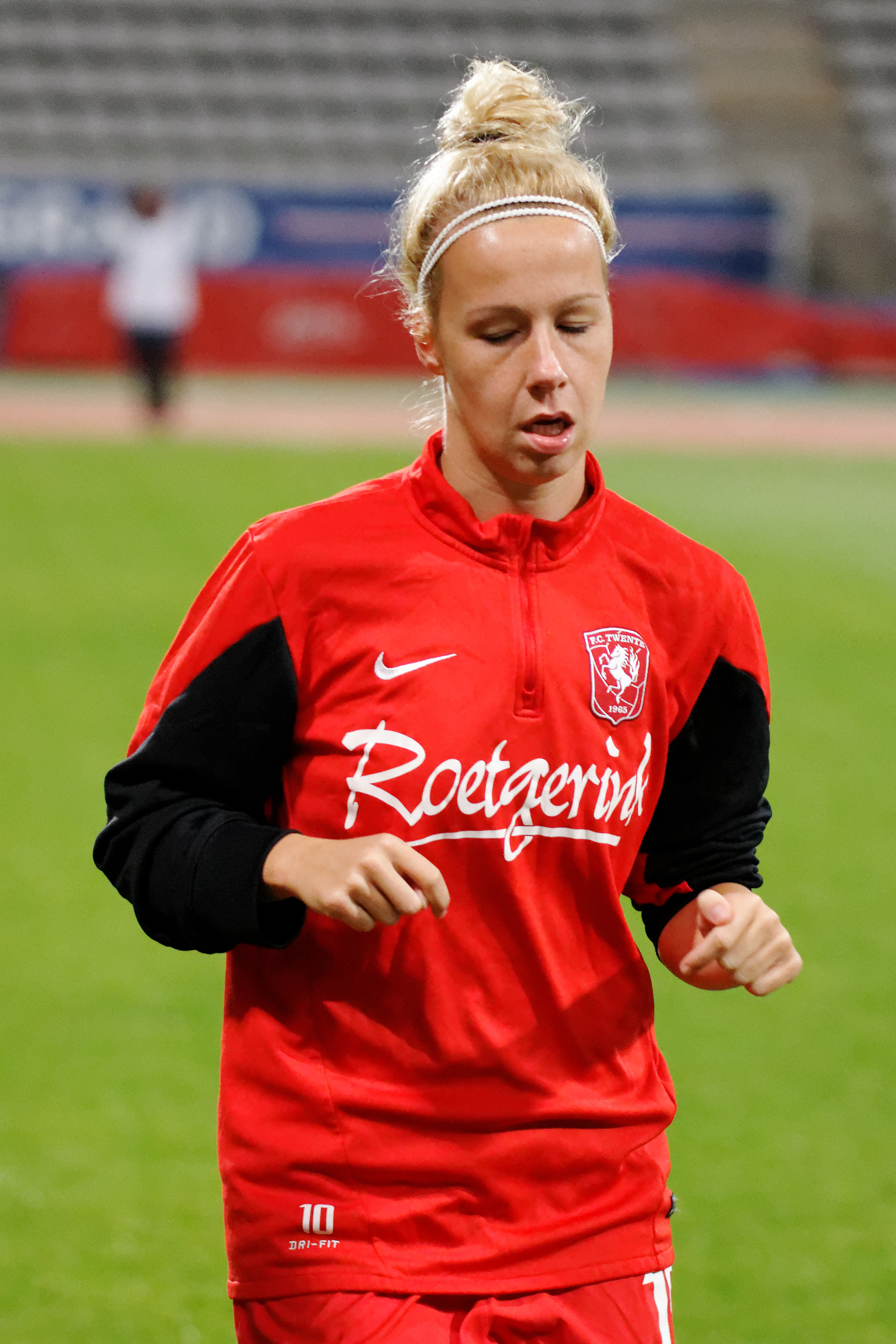
- Heuver with Twente in 2014

Personal information
- Full name: Maayke Heuver
- Date of birth: 26 July 1990 (age 36)
- Place of birth: Vriezenveen, Netherlands
- Positions: Midfielder; defender

Youth career
- DOS '37
- 2007–2008: Twente

Senior career*
Years	Team	Apps	(Gls)
2008–2016	Twente	154	(48)

International career
2009	Netherlands U19	4	(1)
2012–2015	Netherlands	17	(2)
- * Club domestic league appearances and goals

Maayke Heuver (born 26 July 1990) is a former Dutch football player, who played as midfielder or defender. She played her entire professional career for FC Twente competing in national tournaments (Eredivisie in the Netherlands and BeNe League in Belgium and Netherlands) and European tournaments (UEFA Women's Champions League). She also played for the Dutch national team.

== Club career ==
Heuver started playing football at the age of 9 for amateur club DOS '37 in Vriezenveen and at the age of 12 became part of the youth Dutch national team. In 2007, after a suggestion from her youth national team coach, she joined the youth team of FC Twente. That meant training at both clubs and playing during the weekends for DOS '37.

In 2008 she moved to FC Twente's first team and soon established herself in the team. She played in all 24 league matches in her first season. Her first title with the club was the 2010–11 Dutch League. In the following season, she made her debut in the UEFA Women's Champions League. Some changes were made in the 2012–13 season, a new league (BeNe League) with clubs from Belgium and the Netherlands was created replacing the national leagues of both countries. FC Twente won the first two seasons (2012–13 and 2013–14) and although runners-up in the third season (2014–15), the club was the highest Dutch team in the competition and were awarded the national championship. Also in 2014–15, she won the Dutch Cup. After three seasons the BeNe League was dissolved and FC Twente won the newly re-established 2015–16 Dutch League and also reached the Round of 16 of the Champions League that same season for the first time, after eliminating Bayern Munich in the Round of 32. In June 2016, Heuver announced her retirement from football.

== International career ==
Heuver entered the Dutch national team set up at youth level, beginning when she was 12 years old (playing for the under-13 team). She progressed through the youth teams reaching the senior team, where she made her debut on 15 February 2012 against France. She scored her first goal in a 2013 UEFA Women's Euro qualification match against Slovenia.

In June 2013 national team coach Roger Reijners left Heuver out of the final Netherlands squad for UEFA Women's Euro 2013 in Sweden. When FC Twente teammate Marlous Pieëte sustained a knee injury on the eve of the tournament, Heuver was recalled as her replacement.

Her last match was on 17 September 2015 against Belarus, by the time her retirement was announced she had played 17 official matches and 1 match not considered as an official friendly (on 1 July 2012 against North Korea) and scored two goals.

=== International goals ===
Scores and results list the Netherlands goal tally first.

Goal	Date	Venue	Opponent	Score	Result	Competition
1.	5 April 2012	De Koel, Venlo, Netherlands	Slovenia	1–0	3–1	2013 UEFA Women's Euro qualification
2.	12 March 2014	GSZ Stadium, Larnaca, Cyprus	Switzerland	4–1	4–1	2014 Cyprus Cup

== Honours ==
FC Twente

- BeNe League (2): 2012–13, 2013–14
- Eredivisie (5): 2010–11, 2012–13*, 2013–14*, 2014–15*, 2015–16
- KNVB Women's Cup (1): 2014–15

*During the BeNe League period (2012 to 2015), the highest placed Dutch team is considered as national champion by the Royal Dutch Football Association.
