= Kirsten van de Ven =

Former Dutch professional footballer

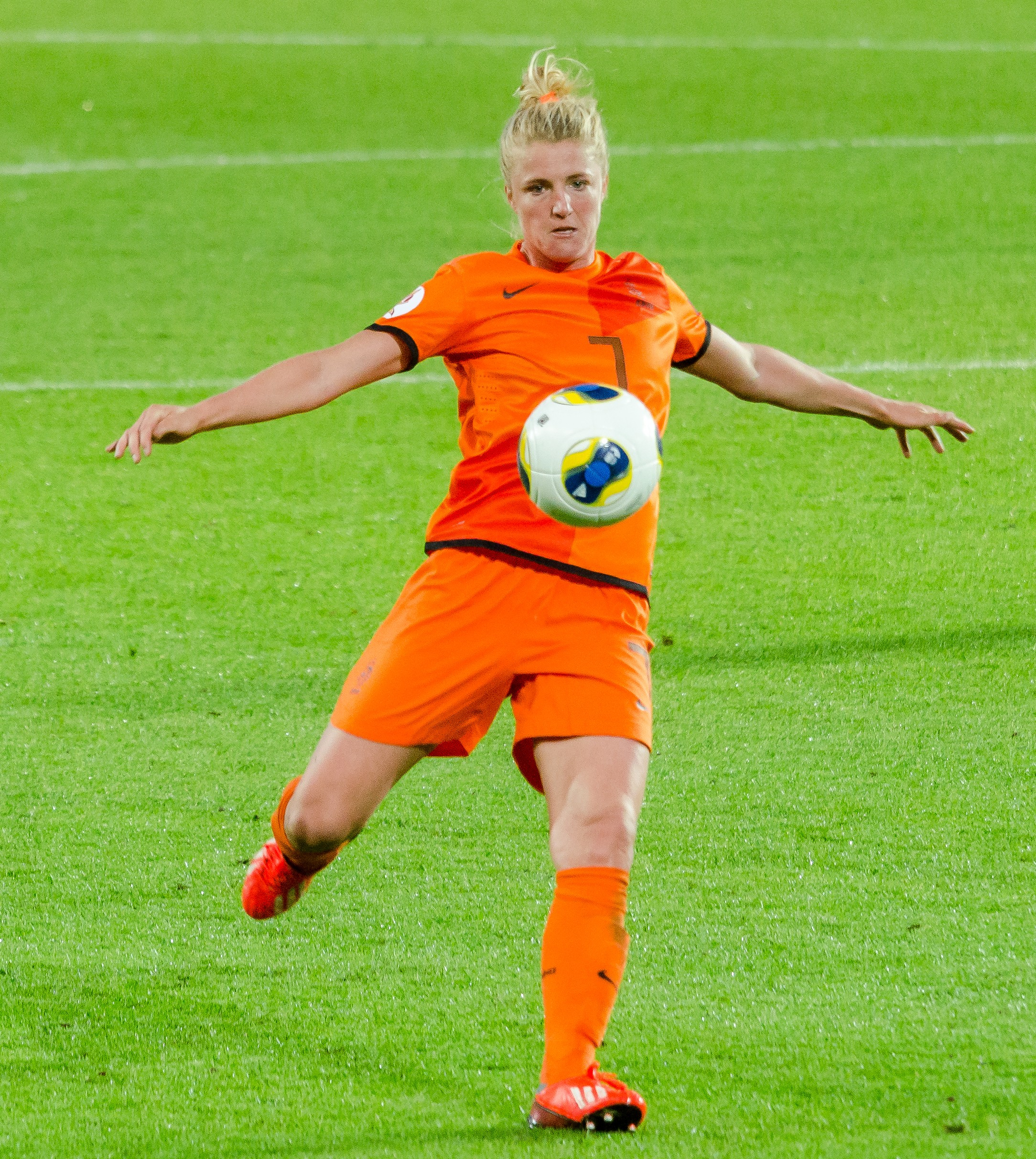
- Van de Ven with Netherlands in 2013

Personal information
- Full name: Kirsten Johanna Maria van de Ven
- Date of birth: 11 May 1985 (age 41)
- Place of birth: Heesch, Netherlands
- Height: 1.73 m (5 ft 8 in)
- Position: Winger

Youth career
- 2002–2004: HVCH

College career
Years	Team	Apps	(Gls)
2004	Quinnipiac Bobcats	18	(12)
2005–2007	Florida State Seminoles	68	(13)

Senior career*
Years	Team	Apps	(Gls)
2008–2009	Willem II Tilburg	30	(13)
2010–2013	Tyresö FF	79	(39)
2014–2015	FC Rosengård	27	(8)
2016	FC Twente	5	(0)
Total		141	(60)

International career
2002	Netherlands U-17	5	(0)
2001–2004	Netherlands U-19	29	(10)
2004–2015	Netherlands	87	(18)
- * Club domestic league appearances and goals

Kirsten Johanna Maria van de Ven (Dutch pronunciation: [ˈkɪrstə ɲoːˈɦɑnaː maːˈrijaː vɑn də ˈvɛn, -stə joːˈ-]; born 11 May 1985) is a former Dutch professional footballer. Prior to her professional career, she played College soccer in the United States. Professionally she played in the Dutch league (Eredivisie) for Willem II Tilburg and FC Twente, and in the Swedish league (Damallsvenskan) for Tyresö FF and FC Rosengård. She won titles at clubs in both Sweden and the Netherlands, as an international player she was a member of the Netherlands women's national football team, and represented her country at the 2009 and 2013 editions of the UEFA Women's Championship, and the 2015 FIFA Women's World Cup.

== Club career ==
=== Early years and college soccer ===
Born in Heesch, she started playing for local amateur club Heesche Voetbal Club Heesch (HVCH) progressing through the boys teams from F4 to the A1 team. In 2004, at the age of 19, she moved to the United States and played College soccer firstly for Quinnipiac Bobcats, where after scoring 12 goals in 18 matches of the 2004 Northeast Conference season, she was named the Northeast Conference's Rookie of the Year and Player of the Year. The remaining three years of her college career were played in the Florida State Seminoles at NCAA level, as a teammate of Hermann Trophy winner Mami Yamaguchi. For the Seminoles she scored 5 goals in 18 matches in the 2005–06 season, 1 goal in 24 matches in 2006–07 and 7 goals in 26 matches in 2007–08.

=== Professional ===
In the end of 2007, she returned to the Netherlands and begun her professional career in January 2008, playing the second half of the 2007–08 Eredivisie season for Willem II Tilburg, helping the team finish as runners-up. In December 2009 it was announced she would join newly promoted Swedish league (Damallsvenskan) club Tyresö FF from March 2010.

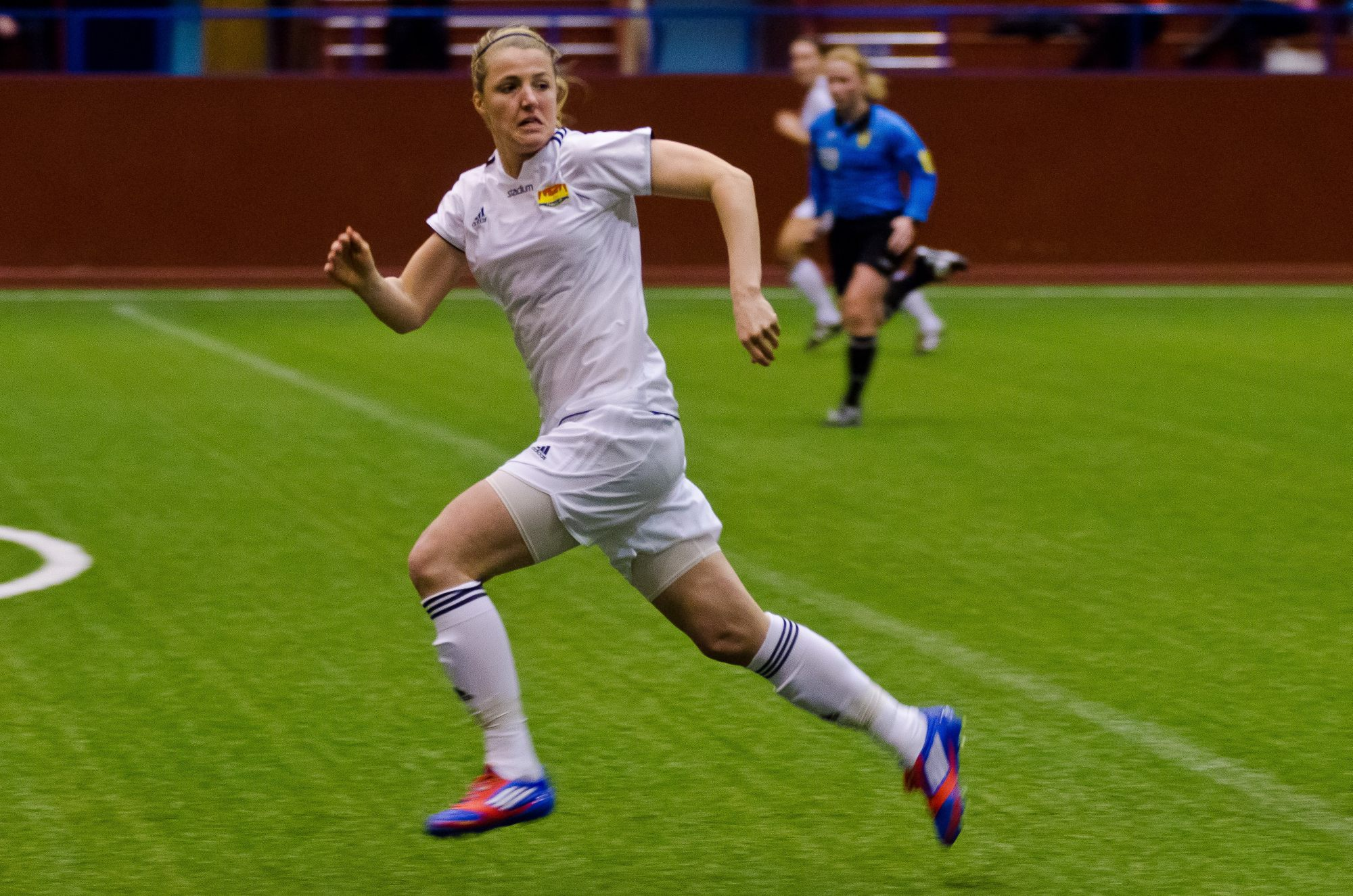
Playing for Tyresö FF in 2012

At Tyresö FF, after being Swedish Cup runner-up in 2011 and 2012, she won the Damallsvenskan in 2012, after beating title rivals LdB FC Malmö 1–0 away in the last round of the season, the goal scored at the 82nd minute of the match. The result meant Tyresö FF clinched the title on goal difference, as both teams finished the season on 55 points. Despite losing the Swedish Supercup in 2013 to Kopparbergs/Göteborg FC on penalty shootout, she made her debut in the UEFA Women's Champions League, scoring a goal in the Round of 16 of the 2013–14 season and helping the team progress further in the tournament.

In December 2013, after four years at Tyresö FF, where she scored 39 league goals in 79 league matches, it was announced that in search of a new challenge she had signed a two-year contract with Damallsvenkan rivals LdB FC Malmö (later renamed FC Rosengård) from January 2014. In the two seasons played with the club, she won the Damallsvenkan twice (2014 and 2015), the Swedish Supercup in 2015 and was runner-up of the Swedish Cup in 2014–15. She also played 9 matches and scored 2 goals for the club in Champions League campaigns.

She returned to her home country in January 2016, signing a half year contract with Dutch champions FC Twente to play the second half of the 2015–16 Eredivisie season. After winning the Dutch title, she announced her retirement from football on 23 May 2016.

== International career ==
She progressed through the national youth teams, where she played for the under-17 and under-19 (including the 2003 UEFA Women's Under-19 Championship).

On 6 August 2004 she made her debut for the senior Netherlands national team under coach Remy Reynierse, coming on as a half-time substitute in a 0–2 friendly defeat to Japan in Zeist. She played in the 2007 FIFA Women's World Cup qualification.

Selected by coach Vera Pauw to be in the national squad for the UEFA Women's Euro 2009, on 23 August 2009 she scored the opening goal in a 2–0 win over Ukraine at the tournament's opening match and the Netherlands debut in a major competition. Her second goal in the tournament came in the Dutch second match, a 1–2 defeat to tournament hosts Finland. She played in all of the Netherlands five matches in the tournament helping the team reach the semifinals.

In June 2013 national team coach Roger Reijners selected her in the 23 player squad for the UEFA Women's Euro 2013 in Sweden.

She was named by coach Roger Reijners in the Dutch squad for the 2015 FIFA Women's World Cup. At the tournament, she scored in the group stage 1–1 draw with hosts Canada and in their 1–2 Round of 16 defeat to Japan.

Shortly after the World Cup, on 23 October 2015, under coach Arjan van der Laan, she made her 87th and final appearance for the national team, in a 2–1 friendly away win over France at Stade Jean-Bouin. She scored 18 goals for the national team.

=== International goals ===
Scores and results list the Netherlands goal tally first.

Goal	Date	Venue	Opponent	Score	Result	Competition
1.	25 October 2008	Pabellón de la Ciudad del Fútbol, Madrid, Spain	Spain	2–0	2–0	2009 UEFA Women's Euro qualification
2.	23 August 2009	Veritas Stadion, Turku, Finland	Ukraine	1–0	2–0	UEFA Women's Euro 2009
3.	26 August 2009	Olympic Stadium, Helsinki, Finland	Finland	1–1	1–2	UEFA Women's Euro 2009
4.	3 March 2010	GSP Stadium, Nicosia, Cyprus	Switzerland	4–0	4–0	2010 Cyprus Cup
5.	21 August 2010	Haradzki Stadium, Maladzechna, Belarus	Belarus	1–0	4–0	2011 FIFA Women's World Cup qualification
6.	12 December 2010	Estádio do Pacaembu, São Paulo, Brazil	Brazil	1–1	2–3	2010 Torneio Internacional
7.	15 December 2010	Estádio do Pacaembu, São Paulo, Brazil	Mexico	1–0	3–1	2010 Torneio Internacional
8.	19 December 2010	Estádio do Pacaembu, São Paulo, Brazil	Mexico	1–0	2–1	2010 Torneio Internacional
9.	7 March 2011	Ammochostos Stadium, Larnaca, Cyprus	Switzerland	1–0	6–0	2011 Cyprus Cup
10.	7 March 2011	Ammochostos Stadium, Larnaca, Cyprus	Switzerland	2–0	6–0	2011 Cyprus Cup
11.	7 March 2011	Ammochostos Stadium, Larnaca, Cyprus	Switzerland	3–0	6–0	2011 Cyprus Cup
12.	3 April 2011	Kras Stadion, Volendam, Netherlands	Scotland	1–0	6–2	Friendly
13.	22 October 2011	Gradski stadion, Vrbovec, Croatia	Croatia	2–0	3–0	UEFA Women's Euro 2013 qualifying
14.	19 November 2011	Ivančna Gorica Stadium, Ivančna Gorica, Slovenia	Slovenia	1–0	2–0	UEFA Women's Euro 2013 qualifying
15.	5 April 2012	De Koel, Venlo, Netherlands	Slovenia	2–1	3–1	UEFA Women's Euro 2013 qualifying
16.	7 February 2015	Polman Stadion, Almelo, Netherlands	Thailand	7–0	7–0	Friendly
17.	15 June 2015	Olympic Stadium, Montreal, Canada	Canada	1–1	1–1	2015 FIFA Women's World Cup
18.	23 June 2015	BC Place, Vancouver, Canada	Japan	1–2	1–2	2015 FIFA Women's World Cup

== Other activities ==
Since September 2017, she is working for the Royal Dutch Football Association (KNVB) as a manager responsible to help develop the women's and girls football in the Netherlands.

== Personal life ==
While playing college soccer in the United States, Kirsten graduated in psychology. Later she also completed a master's degree in Labour and Organizational Psychology at the Tilburg University.

She is not related to Tottenham Hotspur defender Micky van de Ven.

== Honours ==
Tyresö FF

- Damallsvenskan (1): 2012

FC Rosengård

- Damallsvenskan (2): 2014 and 2015
- Svenska Supercupen (1): 2015

FC Twente

- Eredivisie (1): 2015–16
