= Joran Pot =

Dutch football coach and former player (born 1989)

Personal information
- Full name: Joran Pot
- Date of birth: 20 January 1989 (age 37)
- Place of birth: Heino, Netherlands
- Height: 1.77 m (5 ft 9 1/2 in)
- Position: Midfielder

Youth career
- vv Heino
- FC Twente VA

Senior career*
Years	Team	Apps	(Gls)
2009–2010	RBC Roosendaal	16	(0)
2010–2012	FC Zwolle	44	(0)
2012–2014	Go Ahead Eagles	15	(0)

Managerial career
- 2019–2022: PEC Zwolle (women)
- 2022–present: FC Twente (women)
- * Club domestic league appearances and goals

Joran Pot (born 20 January 1989 in Heino) is the manager of Dutch women's professional football club FC Twente Vrouwen. He became the coach of Twente in 2022. Under his leadership, Twente won the Eredivisie Vrouwen title in the 2023–24 season and the Super Cup in 2022, 2023, and 2024. He previously coached PEC Zwolle's women's team for three seasons.

Pot was also a Dutch professional footballer who played as a midfielder for RBC Roosendaal, FC Zwolle, and Go Ahead Eagles. He was part of the FC Zwolle club that won the Eerste Division in the 2011–12 season. His highest level of play was in two matches in the Eredivisie for Go Ahead Eagles in the 2013–14 season.
