= Jill Roord =

Dutch footballer (born 1997)

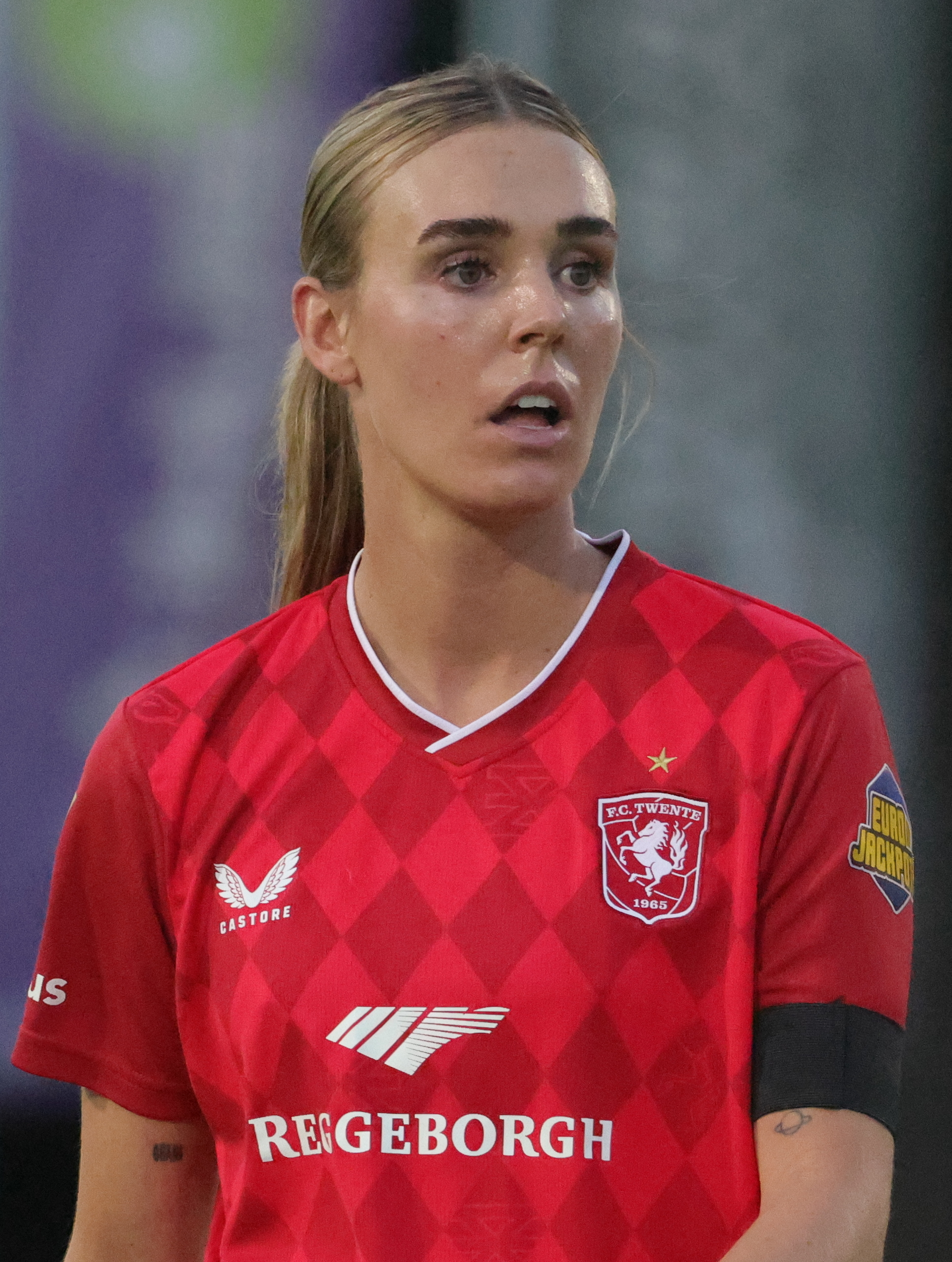
- Roord with Twente in 2025

Personal information
- Full name: Jill Jamie Roord
- Date of birth: 22 April 1997 (age 29)
- Place of birth: Oldenzaal, Netherlands
- Height: 1.76 m (5 ft 9 in)
- Position: Midfielder

Team information
- Current team: Twente
- Number: 10

Youth career
- 2008–2013: Twente

Senior career*
Years	Team	Apps	(Gls)
2013–2017	Twente	105	(57)
2017–2019	Bayern Munich	36	(13)
2019–2021	Arsenal	33	(9)
2021–2023	VfL Wolfsburg	40	(16)
2023–2025	Manchester City	30	(11)
2025–	Twente	26	(15)

International career^{‡}
2011–2012	Netherlands U15	8	(4)
2011–2012	Netherlands U16	8	(1)
2011–2013	Netherlands U17	16	(13)
2013–2016	Netherlands U19	28	(25)
2015–	Netherlands	117	(31)
Medal record
Women's football
Representing the Netherlands
FIFA Women's World Cup
Runner-up	2019 France
UEFA Women's Championship
Winner	2017 Netherlands
- * Club domestic league appearances and goals as of 21 November 2026 ‡ National team caps and goals as of 13 October 2026

Jill Jamie Roord (born 22 April 1997) is a Dutch professional footballer who plays as an attacking midfielder for Vrouwen Eredivisie club FC Twente and the Netherlands national team. She previously played for Arsenal and Manchester City in the English Women's Super League, Bayern Munich and VfL Wolfsburg in the German Frauen-Bundesliga and won multiple Dutch national titles with Twente in the top Dutch Vrouwen Eredivisie. During the 2015–16 Eredivisie season, she was the top scorer in the league.

In 2017, Roord represented the Netherlands in their victorious UEFA Women's Euro 2017 campaign and competed at the 2019 FIFA Women's World Cup in France two years later at the age of 22. She has gone on to earn over 100 senior international caps and is her country's seventh all-time top scorer.

== Early life ==
Born and raised in Oldenzaal, a city in the eastern province of Overijssel, Jill is the daughter of former Dutch footballer and current FC Twente women's technical manager René Roord. Her mother played basketball. As a young child, Roord was always playing football outside with boys, her friends and brothers before and after school. She joined a club for the first time at age five. Her idol was Ronaldinho.

== Club career ==
=== FC Twente ===
Roord started her career in 2008 at the under-13 team of FC Twente and quickly progressed through the youth teams. At the age of 16 she made her debut in the first team. She helped the team to win the BeNe League (Belgian and Dutch leagues combined in a single League played between 2012 and 2015) twice, the Eredivisie (Dutch League) once and the KNVB Women's Cup (Dutch Cup) once.

Roord fired Twente to the 2015-16 Eredivisie title, finishing as the league's top scorer with 20 goals and producing a career-best goal tally of 29 in all competitions. In addition to domestic trophies, she also made her UEFA Champions League debut with the club in 2013. On 1 April 2017, she played her 100th match for the club. Roord had a fantastic scoring record of 77 goals in 134 games for Twente.

=== Bayern Munich ===
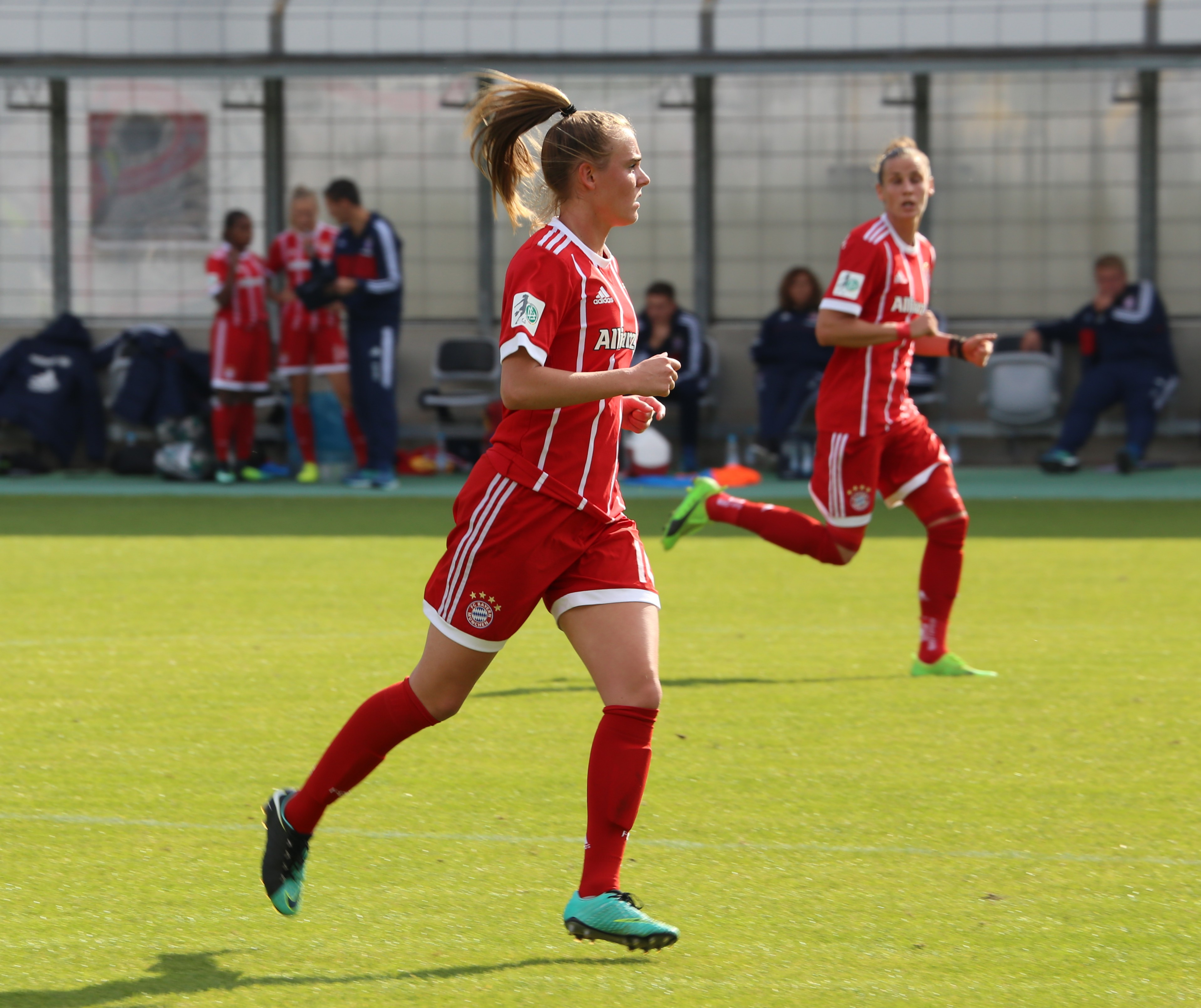
Roord playing for Bayern Munich, 2017

Ahead of the 2017–18 season, Roord signed a two-year contract with Bayern Munich to play in Germany's top league, the Frauen-Bundesliga. On 2 September 2017, she made her debut for the club in a 3–0 win over SGS Essen. On 15 October 2017, she scored her first goal in a 2–0 home victory against SC Sand. During her first season with the club, Roord scored six goals in the 17 games in which she played. Bayern Munich finished in second place during the regular season with a 17–3–2 record. Her six goals tied with two other players as the third top goal scorers on the team.

On 4 October 2017, Roord made her first UEFA Champions League appearance for the club in a 1–0 away loss to Chelsea.

During the 2018–19 season, Roord scored 7 goals in 19 appearances for Bayern Munich. Early in the season, head coach Thomas Wörle was quoted, "You can already say that Jill is one of the greatest talents in Europe. In the past six months, she has been extremely tough, scoring and preparing a lot of goals." Bayern Munich finished in second place with a 17–1–4 record. On 5 May 2019, Roord announced she would be leaving Bayern München at the end of the season. Nine days later, her signing with Arsenal was announced.

=== Arsenal ===
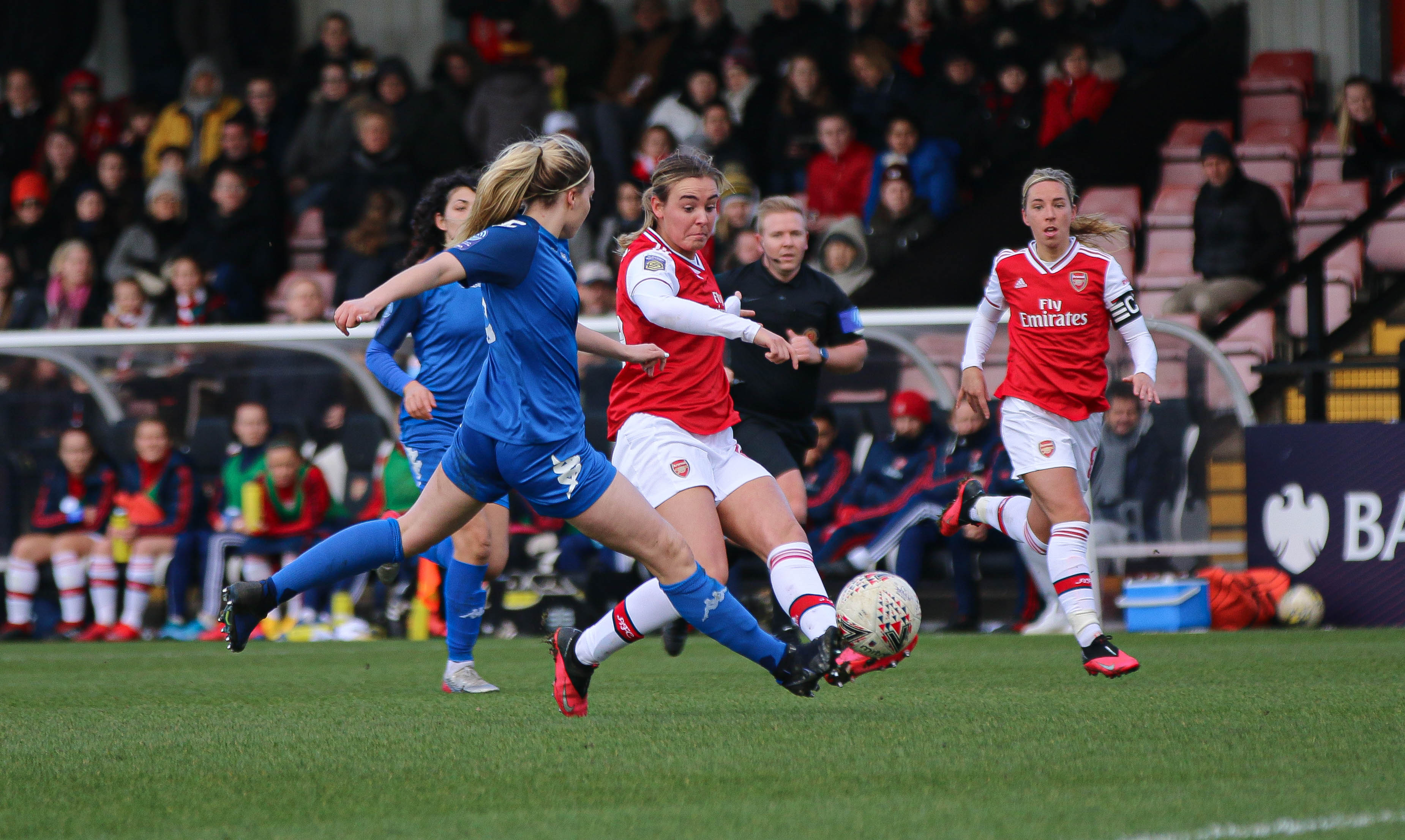
Roord playing for Arsenal, February 2020

Roord signed with Arsenal on 14 May 2019. During a friendly match against Tottenham Hotspur, she scored a hat-trick lifting Arsenal to a 6–0 win. Roord scored two goals in the fourteen games in which she played during the 2019–20 FA WSL season. Arsenal finished in third place during the regular season with a 12–3–0 record and were runners-up for the league cup after being defeated by Chelsea 2–1 during the final.

During the 2020–21 FA WSL season, Roord scored two consecutive hat-tricks in the team's season-opening matches again Reading and West Ham United. She was named Player of the Month for September by the league and the first women's footballer ever to be named in the DAZN European Team of the Week. She sat out some games due to a knee injury she endured during an international match against Russia.

=== VfL Wolfsburg ===
On 10 May 2021, It was announced that Roord would be joining Bundesliga side VfL Wolfsburg in the summer from Arsenal for an undisclosed fee, Roord signed a contract with Wolfsburg until 2024. On 12 September, Roord scored her first goal for VfL Wolfsburg in a league match against SC Sand a game they would win 4–0.

=== Manchester City ===
On 6 July 2023, it was announced that Roord had signed for English WSL club Manchester City on a three-year deal. Her transfer fee was reported to be in excess of £300,000, making her the most expensive signing in the club's history. On 24 January 2024, Roord suffered an anterior cruciate ligament injury during a 2–1 FA Women's League Cup win against Manchester United.

She returned from injury on 29 September 2024, for the 1–0 victory against Brighton, and scored her first goal since returning on 20 October; a 70th-minute winner in a 2–1 victory against Aston Villa. The attacking midfielder scored again in both of the following games, stating, "Physically, I feel stronger and fitter than I have ever been." Across her two seasons with Man City, Roord scored 14 goals and registered six assists in 47 appearances.

=== Return to FC Twente ===
On 24 May 2025, Dutch champions FC Twente announced the signing of Roord from Manchester City on a three-year contract. The transfer saw Roord return to the club where she began her professional career and to her homeland of the Netherlands after eight years playing abroad. She cited "not being able to be with family and friends" as a reason for needing to "move back home" to Twente.

== International career ==
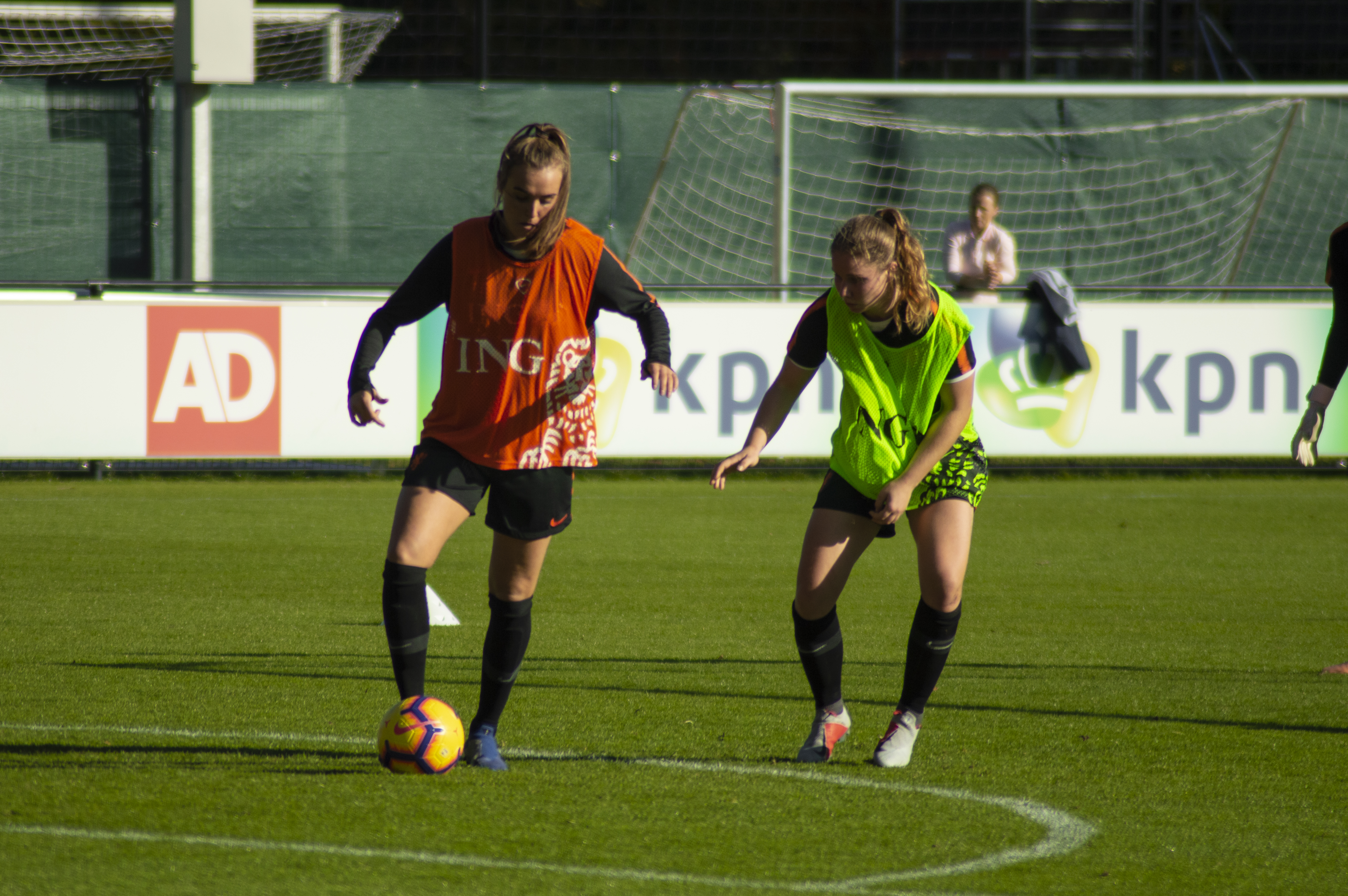
Roord and Sisca Folkertsma training with the senior national team, 2018

To score the winning goal in my first World Cup game was amazing. It was the best moment [of my career] so far. After the game, I went to my family and my mum was crying. It was a really beautiful moment.

— Jill Roord, FIFA

=== Youth ===
Roord has represented the Netherlands in every youth national teams including the under-19, under-17, under-16, and under-15 squads. Roord competed at and won the UEFA Under-19 Championship in 2014.

=== Senior ===
She made her debut for the senior team on 7 February 2015 during a match against Thailand. In May 2015, she was named to the 23-player roster called to represent Netherlands at the 2015 FIFA World Cup. In June 2017, she was in the 23-player squad that won the UEFA Euro 2017, a historical first for the Netherlands. After the tournament ended, Roord and her teammates were honoured by the Prime Minister and the Minister of Sport and made Knights of the Order of Orange-Nassau.

2019–2024

In 2019, Roord was called to represent the Netherlands in the 2019 World Cup in France. She scored the Netherlands' game-winning goal during the team's first match of the tournament against New Zealand, marking the first Netherlands goal at the tournament. Her 92nd-minute goal after being subbed cemented the foundation for the Netherlands' group E lead. During the team's second group stage match against Cameroon, Roord was subbed in the 71st minute during the Netherlands' 3–1 win. After the Dutch defeated Canada 2–1 and finished at the top of Group E, they advanced to the knockout stage where they defeated 2011 champions, Japan 2–1, with Roord subbing in the 87th minute. Roord subbed in during the 87th minute of the team's quarterfinal win against Italy and advanced to the semifinals – a first in the Netherlands team's history. During the semi-final match against Sweden, Roord played in the defender position in front of 48,452 spectators in Lyon. The defense kept a clean sheet and the Netherlands won 1–0 advancing to the final against 2015 champions, the United States. Roord subbed in during the 66th minute of the Final after the United States took a 2–0 lead and eventual win.

Roord was named to the squad for UEFA Women's Euro 2022 qualifying matches (2021 was postponed due to the COVID-19 pandemic). During a match against Estonia on 30 August 2019, she scored the Netherlands' second goal of the team's 7–0 win. Roord scored the Netherlands' game-winning goal in the 1–0 win against Russia on 18 September further cementing the team's place at the Euro 2022.

On 31 May 2023, she was named as part of the Netherlands provisional squad for the 2023 World Cup. Roord scored in the Netherlands' second match against the USA.

Roord scored twice in the Netherlands' blowout 15–0 win over Indonesia on 25 October 2024. In her next game, she recorded her 100th cap in a 2–1 friendly victory over Denmark on 29 October 2024.

== Personal life ==
Roord is currently in a romantic relationship with Dutch field hockey player Pien Sanders. She has previously dated FC Barcelona Femení player Jana Fernández.

== Career statistics ==
=== Club ===
As of match played 14 November 2026

Appearances and goals by club, season and competition
Club	Season	League			National Cup (Note: Includes KNVB Women's Cup, DFB-Pokal Frauen, Women's FA Cup)		League Cup (Note: Includes FA Women's League Cup)		Continental (Note: Includes UEFA Women's Champions League)		Other (Note: Includes KNVB Women's Super Cup)		Total	
Club	Season	Division	Apps	Goals	Apps	Goals	Apps	Goals	Apps	Goals	Apps	Goals	Apps	Goals
FC Twente	2012–13	BeNe League	5	2	?	0	—		0	0	—		5	2
FC Twente	2013–14	BeNe League	27	13	?	0	—		5	4	—		33	17
FC Twente	2014–15	BeNe League	24	13	4	2	—		2	0	—		30	15
FC Twente	2015–16	Eredivisie	24	20	2	1	—		7	8	—		33	29
FC Twente	2016–17	Eredivisie	25	9	2	3	—		7	2	—		34	14
FC Twente	Total		105	57	8	6	0	0	21	14	0	0	134	77
Bayern Munich	2017–18	Frauen-Bundesliga	17	6	5	6	—		1	0	—		23	12
Bayern Munich	2018–19	Frauen-Bundesliga	19	7	2	2	—		6	4	—		27	13
Bayern Munich	Total		36	13	7	8	0	0	7	4	0	0	50	25
Arsenal	2019–20	Women's Super League	14	2	2	0	8	2	5	1	—		29	5
Arsenal	2020–21	Women's Super League	19	7	2	4	2	0	—		—		23	11
Arsenal	Total		33	9	4	4	10	2	5	1	0	0	52	16
VfL Wolfsburg	2021–22	Frauen-Bundesliga	22	10	4	4	—		12	6	—		38	20
VfL Wolfsburg	2022–23	Frauen-Bundesliga	18	6	4	3	—		9	2	—		31	11
VfL Wolfsburg	Total		40	16	8	7	0	0	21	8	0	0	69	31
Manchester City	2023–24	Women's Super League	11	6	1	2	4	0	—		—		16	8
Manchester City	2024–25	Women's Super League	19	5	3	1	3	0	6	0	—		31	6
Manchester City	Total		30	11	4	3	7	0	6	0	0	0	47	14
FC Twente	2025–26	Eredivisie	16	7	2	0	—		10	5	1	0	26	12
FC Twente	2026–27	Eredivisie	10	8	0	0	—		—		1	0	11	8
FC Twente	Total		26	15	2	0	0	0	10	5	2	0	40	20
Career Total			270	121	33	28	17	2	70	27	2	0	384	175

=== International ===
As of match played 13 October 2026

Appearances and goals by national team and year
National team	Year	Apps	Goals
Netherlands	2015	6	1
Netherlands	2016	3	0
Netherlands	2017	13	2
Netherlands	2018	12	0
Netherlands	2019	20	2
Netherlands	2020	4	3
Netherlands	2021	15	7
Netherlands	2022	11	5
Netherlands	2023	14	6
Netherlands	2024	4	3
Netherlands	2025	11	1
Netherlands	2026	4	1
Total		117	31

Scores and results list the Netherlands' goal tally first, score column indicates score after each Roord goal.

List of international goals scored by Jill Roord
No.	Date	Venue	Opponent	Score	Result	Competition
1	20 May 2015	Sparta Stadion, Rotterdam, Netherlands	Estonia	1–0	7–0	Friendly
2	20 January 2017	Pinatar Arena, San Pedro del Pinatar, Spain	Romania	2–1	7–1	Friendly
3	20 January 2017	Pinatar Arena, San Pedro del Pinatar, Spain	Romania	3–1	7–1	Friendly
4	11 June 2019	Stade Océane, Le Havre, France	New Zealand	1–0	1–0	2019 FIFA Women's World Cup
5	30 August 2019	A. Le Coq Arena, Tallinn, Estonia	Estonia	2–0	7–0	UEFA Women's Euro 2022 qualifying
6	18 September 2020	Sapsan Arena, Moscow, Russia	Russia	1–0	1–0	UEFA Women's Euro 2022 qualifying
7	1 December 2020	Rat Verlegh Stadion, Breda, Netherlands	Kosovo	2–0	6–0	UEFA Women's Euro 2022 qualifying
8	1 December 2020	Rat Verlegh Stadion, Breda, Netherlands	Kosovo	5–0	6–0	UEFA Women's Euro 2022 qualifying
9	18 February 2021	Stade Roi Baudouin, Belgium	Belgium	2–0	6–1	Friendly
10	13 April 2021	De Goffert, Nijmegen, Netherlands	Australia	1–0	5–0	Friendly
11	15 June 2021	Enschede stadion, Enschede, Netherlands	Norway	4–0	7–0	Friendly
12	21 July 2021	Miyagi Stadium, Rifu, Japan	Zambia	8–1	10–3	2020 Olympic Games
13	22 October 2021	AEK Arena, Larnaca, Cyprus	Cyprus	3–0	8-0	2023 FIFA Women's World Cup qualification
14	22 October 2021	AEK Arena, Larnaca, Cyprus	Cyprus	4–0	8-0	2023 FIFA Women's World Cup qualification
15	22 October 2021	AEK Arena, Larnaca, Cyprus	Cyprus	6–0	8-0	2023 FIFA Women's World Cup qualification
16	8 April 2022	Euroborg, Groningen, Netherlands	Cyprus	2–0	12–0	2023 FIFA Women's World Cup qualification
17	8 April 2022	Euroborg, Groningen, Netherlands	Cyprus	3–0	12–0	2023 FIFA Women's World Cup qualification
18	8 April 2022	Euroborg, Groningen, Netherlands	Cyprus	8–0	12–0	2023 FIFA Women's World Cup qualification
19	28 June 2022	De Grolsch Veste, Enschede, Netherlands	Belarus	1–0	3–0	2023 FIFA Women's World Cup qualification
20	9 July 2022	Bramall Lane, Sheffield, England	Sweden	1–1	1–1	UEFA Euro 2022
21	11 April 2023	Sparta Stadion Het Kasteel, Rotterdam, Netherlands	Poland	2–1	4–1	Friendly
22	27 July 2023	Wellington Regional Stadium, Wellington, New Zealand	United States	1–0	1–1	2023 FIFA Women's World Cup
23	1 August 2023	Forsyth Barr Stadium, Dunedin, New Zealand	Vietnam	4–0	7–0	2023 FIFA Women's World Cup
24	1 August 2023	Forsyth Barr Stadium, Dunedin, New Zealand	Vietnam	7–0	7–0	2023 FIFA Women's World Cup
25	6 August 2023	Sydney Football Stadium, Sydney, Australia	South Africa	1–0	2–0	2023 FIFA Women's World Cup
26	22 September 2023	Den Dreef, Leuven, Belgium	Belgium	1–0	1–2	2023–24 UEFA Women's Nations League
27	25 October 2024	De Vijverberg, Doetinchem, Netherlands	Indonesia	2–0	15–0	Friendly
28	25 October 2024	De Vijverberg, Doetinchem, Netherlands	Indonesia	7–0	15–0	Friendly
29	29 November 2024	Sparta Stadion Het Kasteel, Rotterdam, Netherlands	China	2–1	4–1	Friendly
30	3 June 2025	Koning Willem II Stadion, Tilburg, Netherlands	Scotland	1–1	1–1	2025 UEFA Women's Nations League
31	3 March 2026	Gdańsk Stadium, Gdańsk, Poland	Poland	2–1	2–2	2027 FIFA Women's World Cup qualification

== Honours ==
FC Twente

- BeNe League: 2012–13, 2013–14
- Eredivisie: 2012–13*, 2013–14*, 2014–15*, 2015–16
- Eredivisie topscorer: 2015–16
- KNVB Women's Cup: 2014–15

*During the BeNe League period (2012 to 2015), the highest placed Netherlands team is considered as national champion by the Royal Dutch Football Association.

Arsenal

- FA Women's League Cup runners-up: 2020

VfL Wolfsburg

- Frauen-Bundesliga: 2021-22
- DFB-Pokal Frauen: 2021-22, 2022-23
- UEFA Women's Champions League runners-up: 2022-23

Netherlands U19

- UEFA Women's Under-19 Championship: 2014

Netherlands

- UEFA Women's Euro: 2017
- Algarve Cup: 2018
- FIFA Women's World Cup: 2019 runners-up

Individual

- UEFA Women's Under-19 Championship team of the tournament: 2016
- WSL Player of the Month: September 2020
- DAZN European Team of the Week

Orders

- Knight of the Order of Orange-Nassau: 2017

== See also ==
- List of FA WSL hat-tricks
- List of association football families
- List of foreign FA Women's Super League players
