= 2015–16 Eredivisie (women) =

Netherlands women's football league returns with FC Twente as champions

Eredivisie Vrouwen
- Season: 2015–16
- Dates: 21 August 2015 – 20 May 2016
- Champions: FC Twente (2nd title)
- UEFA Women's Champions League: FC Twente
- Matches: 84
- Goals: 309 (3.68 per match)
- Top goalscorer: Jill Roord (20 goals)
- Biggest home win: PSV 9–2 Telstar; Twente 8–1 Telstar
- Biggest away win: Zwolle 0–7 Twente
- Highest scoring: PSV 9–2 Telstar

The 2015–16 Eredivisie Vrouwen was the sixth season of the Netherlands women's professional football league, and the first season since 2011–12. The Eredivisie returned after a three-season absence, when it was replaced by the BeNe League, which included teams from the Netherlands and Belgium. The season took place from 21 August 2015 to 20 May 2016 with seven teams. FC Twente won its second Eredivisie title and became Dutch champions for a fourth consecutive year, including its BeNe League titles.

== Teams ==
Location of teams in the Eredivisie 2015–16

Since the last Eredivisie season in 2011–12, VVV-Venlo and FC Utrecht dropped their women's teams. Ajax and PSV, both of which established women's teams in 2012, made their debut in the league alongside ADO Den Haag, SC Heerenveen, Telstar, FC Twente and PEC Zwolle, which all returned to the Eredivisie from the BeNe League.

Team	City / Town	Venue(s)	Capacity
ADO Den Haag	The Hague	Kyocera Stadion	15,000
ADO Den Haag	The Hague	Sportpark Nieuw Hanenburg	1,500
AFC Ajax	Amsterdam	Sportpark De Toekomst	2,000
SC Heerenveen	Heerenveen	Sportpark Skoatterwâld	3,000
SC Heerenveen	Heerenveen	Zuidersportpark (Sneek)	3,150
PSV Eindhoven	Eindhoven	Jan Louwers Stadion	4,600
PSV Eindhoven	Eindhoven	Sportcomplex De Herdgang	2,500
Telstar	Velsen	Telstar Stadion	3,625
Telstar	Velsen	Sportpark De Wending (Heerhugowaard)	1,000
Telstar	Velsen	AFAS Trainingscomplex (Wormerland)	1,000
FC Twente	Enschede	De Grolsch Veste	30,205
FC Twente	Enschede	Sportpark Slangenbeek (Hengelo)	2,000
FC Twente	Enschede	FC Twente-trainingscentrum (Hengelo)	1,000
PEC Zwolle	Zwolle	IJsseldelta Stadion	12,500
PEC Zwolle	Zwolle	Sportpark Ceintuurbaan	3,000

Source: Soccerway

== Format ==
The seven teams played each other four times, twice home and twice away. The champion qualifies to the UEFA Women's Champions League. There was no relegation system in place.

== Standings ==
Pos	Team	Pld	W	D	L	GF	GA	GD	Pts	Qualification
1	Twente (C, Q)	24	18	2	4	79	21	+58	56	Qualification to Champions League Qualifying round
2	Ajax	24	17	5	2	46	11	+35	56	
3	PSV Eindhoven	24	14	3	7	57	35	+22	45	
4	ADO	24	10	4	10	45	42	+3	34	
5	Telstar	24	6	2	16	33	79	−46	20	
6	Heerenveen	24	4	5	15	21	54	−33	17	
7	Zwolle	24	2	5	17	28	67	−39	11	

Source: soccerway.com
Rules for classification: 1) Points; 2) Goal difference; 3) Number of goals scored; 4) Head-to-head points; 5) Head-to-head goal difference; 6) Head-to-head away goals scored
(C) Champions; (Q) Qualified for the phase indicated

== Results ==
Season's first half

Home \ Away	ADO	AJX	HEE	PSV	TEL	TWE	ZWO
ADO Den Haag		1–2	2–0	5–1	4–3	0–2	1–1
Ajax	0–0		4–1	1–0	4–1	1–1	1–0
Heerenveen	1–1	0–4		1–1	2–3	1–3	1–1
PSV/FCE	4–1	1–3	3–1		9–2	2–1	5–2
Telstar	3–2	0–5	1–1	1–2		1–7	3–1
Twente	3–1	3–2	3–0	3–2	6–0		4–1
PEC Zwolle	5–5	0–1	1–2	1–4	1–2	0–7	

Updated to match(es) played on 11 December 2015. Source: soccerway.com
Legend: Blue = home team win; Yellow = draw; Red = away team win.

Season's second half

Home \ Away	ADO	AJX	HEE	PSV	TEL	TWE	ZWO
ADO Den Haag		0–2	3–0	2–1	1–2	1–0	3–2
Ajax	1–0		1–0	1–0	5–0	1–1	3–0
Heerenveen	0–3	0–0		1–2	2–1	0–5	3–0
PSV/FCE	2–1	0–0	6–0		3–1	2–0	2–2
Telstar	0–3	0–1	2–1	1–2		2–4	1–3
Twente	7–1	1–0	2–0	4–0	8–1		1–2
PEC Zwolle	0–4	1–3	2–3	0–3	2–2	0–3	

Updated to match(es) played on 20 May 2016. Source: soccerway.com
Legend: Blue = home team win; Yellow = draw; Red = away team win.

== Top scorers ==
As of matches played on 20 May 2016.

Rank	Player	Club	Goals
1	(Netherlands) Jill Roord	FC Twente	20
2	(Netherlands) Ellen Jansen	FC Twente	17
3	(Netherlands) Renate Jansen	FC Twente	13
4	(Netherlands) Lineth Beerensteyn	ADO Den Haag	11
4	(Netherlands) Vanity Lewerissa	PSV Eindhoven	11
6	(Netherlands) Nadia Coolen	PSV Eindhoven	9
6	(Netherlands) Myrthe Moorrees	PSV Eindhoven	9
8	(Netherlands) Eshly Bakker	AFC Ajax	8
8	(Netherlands) Maayke Heuver	FC Twente	8
8	(Netherlands) Babiche Roof	Telstar	8
8	(Netherlands) Shanice van de Sanden	FC Twente	8
