= Robert de Pauw =

Dutch association football coach

Personal information
- Full name: Robert Louis de Pauw
- Date of birth: 24 July 1981 (age 45)
- Place of birth: Nijmegen, Netherlands

Team information
- Current team: NEC Nijmegen U19 (manager)

Senior career*
Years	Team	Apps	(Gls)
?–2007	Unknown Tweede Divisie club(s)		

Managerial career
- 1994–?: NEC Nijmegen (U15, U19, U23)
- 2017–2018: Achilles '29 Vrouwen
- 2018–2020: Netherlands Women's U-17
- 2021–2022: FC Twente Vrouwen
- 2022–2024: Bayer 04 Leverkusen Women
- 2024: Aston Villa Women
- 2025: NEC Nijmegen U15
- 2025–: NEC Nijmegen U19
- * Club domestic league appearances and goals

Robert Louis de Pauw (born 24 July 1981) is a Dutch professional football coach and former player who is the current manager of NEC Nijmegen U19. He has also managed FC Twente Vrouwen, Bayer 04 Leverkusen Women and Aston Villa Women.

== Playing career ==
=== Tweede Devisie ===
Robert de Pauw played football within the Tweede Divisie until he retired at the age of 26 due to several injuries, and to also focus on his managerial career.

== Managerial career ==
=== NEC Nijmegen Youth ===
Robert de Pauw began his managerial career at the age of 13 after his father, who was the then sporting director at SCE Nijmegen, offered him to help train the 7 to 8-year-olds. After coaching several youth teams, he was able to coach the first teams at the professional level with the U15, U19 and U23 teams of NEC Nijmegen.

He became the manager of NEC Nijmegen U15 again in March 2025 and became the U19 manager on 4 August 2025.

=== Achilles '29 Vrouwen ===
The first senior team managed by de Pauw was Achilles '29 Vrouwen and he was appointed as their manager in May 2017; he stayed until the end of the 2017–18 season.

=== Netherlands under-17 Women ===
He was then appointed as the manager of the Netherlands Women's U-17 national team during qualification for the 2019 UEFA Women's Under-17 Championship; he also managed the team that lost in the final of the competition on penalties to Germany.

=== FC Twente Vrouwen ===
He then joined FC Twente Vrouwen as their manager in 2021, and in 2022, he completed the double with them by winning both the 2021–22 Eredivisie Vrouwen and the 2021–22 Eredivisie Cup.

=== Bayer 04 Leverkusen Women ===
de Pauw joined Bayer 04 Leverkusen Women in the summer of 2022. In the 2022–23 season, he guided the club to fifth, and during the 2023–24 season, his club placed sixth within the Frauen-Bundesliga.

=== Aston Villa Women ===
On 29 June 2024, it was announced that Robert de Pauw joined Aston Villa Women as their next manager on a three-year contract with an option to extend this contract further by one more year, becoming the first Dutch manager to manage a club in the Women's Super League.

His first match in charge of Aston Villa was a 1–0 friendly win against Liverpool on 17 August 2024.

On 11 December 2024, Aston Villa announced that de Pauw had left the club. At the time of his departure, Aston Villa were one point above the relegation zone of the Women's Super League, having won one league game in nine since de Pauw took charge.

== Personal life ==
De Pauw is the father of two daughters, and in 2004, he graduated from the University of Arnhem and Nijmegen with a Bachelor of Social Work.

De Pauw lives with his family in Nijmegen and has an apartment in Leverkusen.

== Honours ==
FC Twente Vrouwen

- Vrouwen Eredivisie: 2022
- Eredivisie Cup: 2022
