= 2014 Cyprus Women's Cup =

Tournament details
- Host country: Cyprus
- Dates: 5–12 March
- Teams: 12 (from 4 confederations)
- Venues: 4 (in 3 host cities)

Final positions
- Champions: France (2nd title)
- Runners-up: England
- Third place: South Korea
- Fourth place: Scotland

Tournament statistics
- Matches played: 24
- Goals scored: 79 (3.29 per match)
- Top scorer(s): (Scotland) Lisa Evans (4 goals)

The 2014 Cyprus Women's Cup was the seventh edition of the Cyprus Women's Cup, an invitational women's football tournament held annually in Cyprus. It took place between 5–12 March 2014.

France won the final over defending champions England. For the first time, Canada did not reach the final, eventually finishing in fifth place.

== Format ==
The first phase of the tournament was a group stage in which the twelve invited teams were divided into three groups of four teams. Each group was a round-robin of six games, where each team played one match against each of the other teams in the same group. The group stage was followed by a single "finals day" in which six games involving all twelve teams were played to determine the tournament's final standings, with the matchups being determined as follows:

1st place match: Winners of Groups A and B.
3rd place match: Winner of Group C and best runner-up from Groups A and B.
5th place match: Runner-up in Group C and second-best runner-up from Groups A and B.
7th place match: Third-place teams in Groups A and B.
9th place match: Third-place team in Group C and best fourth-place team from Groups A and B.
11th place match: Fourth-place team in Group C and second-best fourth-place team from Groups A and B.

== Venues ==
Games were played in 4 host stadiums in 3 cities.

Host cities

Stadium	City	Capacity
GSP Stadium	Nicosia	22,859
GSZ Stadium	Larnaca	13,032
Ammochostos Stadium	Larnaca	5,500
Paralimni Stadium	Paralimni	5,800

== Teams ==
Listed are the confirmed teams.

- England
- Italy
- Finland
- Canada
- Netherlands
- France
- Scotland
- Australia
- South Korea
- New Zealand
- Switzerland
- Republic of Ireland

== Group stage ==
=== Group A ===
Team	Pld	W	D	L	GF	GA	GD	Pts
England	3	3	0	0	7	0	+7	9
Canada	3	2	0	1	6	3	+3	6
Italy	3	0	1	2	2	6	−4	1
Finland	3	0	1	2	1	7	−6	1

5 March 2014
14:30

Canada	3–0	Finland
Schmidt 34', 41'; Sinclair 60'	Report

GSP Stadium, Nicosia
5 March 2014
17:30

England	2–0	Italy
Carney 45' (pen.); Duggan 62'	Report

Ammochostos Stadium, Larnaca

7 March 2014
14:30

Finland	0–3	England
	Report	Asante 31'; Bonner 67'; Aluko 72'

GSZ Stadium, Larnaca
7 March 2014
17:30

Canada	3–1	Italy
Matheson 33'; Leon 44'; Kyle 48'	Report (CS); Report (FIGC)	Girelli 51'

GSZ Stadium, Larnaca

10 March 2014
14:30

England	2–0	Canada
Sanderson 2', 33'	Report (FA); Report (CS)

GSP Stadium, Nicosia
10 March 2014
14:30

Italy	1–1	Finland
Panico 82'	Report	Talonen 34'

GSZ Stadium, Larnaca

=== Group B ===
Team	Pld	W	D	L	GF	GA	GD	Pts
France	3	2	1	0	7	3	+4	7
Scotland	3	2	1	0	9	6	+3	7
Australia	3	0	1	2	6	9	−3	1
Netherlands	3	0	1	2	5	9	−4	1

5 March 2014
14:30

Netherlands	2–2	Australia
Miedema 12' van der Gragt 33'	Report	Gorry 54'; Heyman 59'

GSZ Stadium, Larnaca
Referee: Linn Andersson (Sweden)
5 March 2014
17:30

France	1–1	Scotland
Beattie 68' (o.g.)	Report	L. Ross 8'

GSZ Stadium, Larnaca
Referee: Frida Nielsen (Denmark)

7 March 2014
14:30

Scotland	4–3	Netherlands
Evans 16', 18', 34'; Beattie 55'	Report	Pieëte 43'; Martens 44'; Melis 70'

GSP Stadium, Nicosia
Referee: Esther Staubli (Switzerland)
7 March 2014
17:30

Australia	2–3	France
Kerr 55' van Egmond 72' (pen.)	Report	Delie 9'; Thomis 24'; Nécib 37'

GSP Stadium, Nicosia

10 March 2014
17:30

Netherlands	0–3	France
	Report	Bussaglia 39', 81'; Renard 90+4'

GSP Stadium, Nicosia
Referee: Lina Lehtovaara (Finland)
10 March 2014
17:30

Australia	2–4	Scotland
Heyman 64', 74'	Report	Evans 13'; J. Ross 30', 31', 70'

GSZ Stadium, Larnaca
Referee: Jenny Palmqvist (Sweden)

=== Group C ===
Team	Pld	W	D	L	GF	GA	GD	Pts
South Korea	3	1	2	0	6	2	+4	5
Republic of Ireland	3	1	2	0	4	3	+1	5
Switzerland	3	1	1	1	4	4	0	4
New Zealand	3	0	1	2	2	7	−5	1

5 March 2014
14:30

New Zealand	1–1	Republic of Ireland
Wilkinson 87'	Report (FAI); Report (OFC)	O'Gorman 64'

Tasos Markos Stadium, Paralimni
5 March 2014
17:30

Switzerland	1–1	South Korea
Dickenmann 6'	Report	Ji So-yun 48'

Tasos Markos Stadium, Paralimni
Referee: Lina Lehtovaara (Finland)

7 March 2014
14:30

Republic of Ireland	1–1	South Korea
Quinn 24'	Report	Ji So-yun 38'

Tasos Markos Stadium, Paralimni
Referee: Lorraine Clark (Scotland)
7 March 2014
17:30

Switzerland	2–1	New Zealand
Aigbogun 65', 67'	Report	Wilkinson 3'

Tasos Markos Stadium, Paralimni
Referee: Rhona Daly (Republic of Ireland)

10 March 2014
14:30

Switzerland	1–2	Republic of Ireland
Dickenmann 76' (pen.)	Report (SFV); Report (FAI)	O’Sullivan 48'; Roche 90'

Tasos Markos Stadium, Paralimni
Referee: Linn Andersson (Sweden)
10 March 2014
17:30

South Korea	4–0	New Zealand
Kwon Hah-nul 8', 71'; Yoo Young-a 36'; Park Hee-young 52'	Report

Tasos Markos Stadium, Paralimni
Referee: Lorraine Clark (Scotland)

== Knockout stage ==
=== Eleventh place match ===
12 March 2014
11:00

Finland	0–1	New Zealand
	Report	Gregorius 42'

Tasos Markos Stadium, Paralimni

=== Ninth place match ===
12 March 2014
11:30

Netherlands	4–1	Switzerland
Miedema 1'; Martens 17', 50'; Heuver 90'	Report	Crnogorčević 3'

GSZ Stadium, Larnaca
Referee: Frida Nielsen (Denmark)

=== Seventh place match ===
12 March 2014
14:00

Italy	2–5	Australia
Tuttino 86'; Panico 90+1'	Report	Kerr 17'; van Egmond 22', 38'; Gorry 56'; Raso 79'

Tasos Markos Stadium, Paralimni

=== Fifth place match ===
12 March 2014
14:00

Canada	2–1	Republic of Ireland
Matheson 55'; Schmidt 90'	Report (CS) (FAI)	Littlejohn 13'

GSP Stadium, Nicosia

=== Third place match ===
12 March 2014
14:30

Scotland	1–1	South Korea
Little 87'	Report	Yoo Young-a 64'
Penalties
Corsie (penalty scored); J. Ross (penalty missed); Beattie (penalty missed); Sneddon (penalty missed)	1–3	(penalty scored) Ji So-yun; (penalty scored) Park Hee-young; (penalty scored) Kwon Hah-nul

GSZ Stadium, Larnaca
Referee: Linn Andersson (Sweden)

=== Final ===
12 March 2014
18:00

England	0–2	France
	Report	Thiney 6'; Abily 18'

GSP Stadium, Nicosia

== Final standings ==
Rank	Team
1st place, gold medalist(s)	France
2nd place, silver medalist(s)	England
3rd place, bronze medalist(s)	South Korea
4	Scotland
5	Canada
6	Republic of Ireland
7	Australia
8	Italy
9	Netherlands
10	Switzerland
11	New Zealand
12	Finland

== Goalscorers ==
4 goals

- (Scotland) Lisa Evans

3 goals

- (Australia) Michelle Heyman
- (Australia) Emily van Egmond
- (Canada) Sophie Schmidt
- (Netherlands) Lieke Martens
- (Scotland) Jane Ross

2 goals

- (Australia) Katrina Gorry
- (Australia) Samantha Kerr
- (Canada) Diana Matheson
- (England) Lianne Sanderson
- (France) Élise Bussaglia
- (Italy) Patrizia Panico
- (Netherlands) Vivianne Miedema
- (New Zealand) Hannah Wilkinson
- (South Korea) Kwon Hah-nul
- (South Korea) Ji So-yun
- (South Korea) Yoo Young-a
- (Switzerland) Lara Dickenmann

1 Goal

- (Australia) Hayley Raso
- (Canada) Kaylyn Kyle
- (Canada) Adriana Leon
- (Canada) Christine Sinclair
- (England) Eniola Aluko
- (England) Anita Asante
- (England) Gemma Bonner
- (England) Karen Carney
- (England) Toni Duggan
- (Finland) Sanna Talonen
- (France) Camille Abily
- (France) Marie-Laure Delie
- (France) Louisa Nécib
- (France) Wendie Renard
- (France) Gaetane Thiney
- (France) Élodie Thomis
- (Republic of Ireland) Ruesha Littlejohn
- (Republic of Ireland) Áine O'Gorman
- (Republic of Ireland) Denise O'Sullivan
- (Republic of Ireland) Louise Quinn
- (Republic of Ireland) Stephanie Roche
- (Italy) Cristiana Girelli
- (Italy) Alessia Tuttino
- (South Korea) Park Hee-young
- (Netherlands) Maayke Heuver
- (Netherlands) Manon Melis
- (Netherlands) Marlous Pieëte
- (Netherlands) Stefanie van der Gragt
- (New Zealand) Sarah Gregorius
- (Scotland) Jen Beattie
- (Scotland) Kim Little
- (Scotland) Leanne Ross
- (Switzerland) Ana-Maria Crnogorčević

1 own goal

- (Scotland) Jen Beattie (for France)
