= FC Twente (women) =

Dutch women's football (soccer) club

- Full name: Stichting FC Twente Vrouwen
- Nicknames: The Tukkers; The girls of Twente; Strong women
- Founded: 21 January 2007 (19 years ago)
- Ground: Sportpark Schreurserve (League and Cup); De Grolsch Veste (Champions League)
- Capacity: 2,000 (Sportpark Schreurserve); 30,200 (De Grolsch Veste)
- Technical Director: René Roord
- Head coach: Corina Dekker
- League: Vrouwen Eredivisie
- 2025–26: Vrouwen Eredivisie, 4th of 12
- Website: fctwente.nl
Home colours	Away colours

FC Twente Vrouwen is a women's football club based in Enschede that competes in the Vrouwen Eredivisie, the top league in the Netherlands. Founded in 2007, it is one of the original members of the Eredivisie. It is the most successful modern Dutch women's club, winning 10 national championships, including two BeNe League titles, as well as winning the KNVB Women's Cup, KNVB Women's Super Cup, and Eredivisie Cup four times each. Its home ground is Sportpark Schreurserve in Enschede, with important matches, including some UEFA Champions League matches, played at the larger De Grolsch Veste.

== History ==
=== Early years ===
In the first half of 2006, FC Twente became the first professional Dutch football club to create a women's section, appointing Mary Kok-Willemsen to set up its women branch. Starting in 2007, the idea was to offer girls and women professional training six days a week and eventually build girls and women's teams. At that time, women's football in the Netherlands was amateur, and most talented female players left for Germany and other countries with professional leagues. In November 2006, the club held a presentation of its women's football department proposal to other amateur clubs and the Netherlands women's national football team coach Vera Pauw.

On 21 January 2007, after holding a players selection trials in two locations (Hengelo and Enschede) attended by 575 players, the club women's section was officially established, consisting of three teams, the senior first team and two youth teams. In March 2007, the Royal Dutch Football Association (KNVB) announced FC Twente as one of the six teams to participate in the inaugural 2007–08 season of the Eredivisie Vrouwen, the professional women's Dutch league.

=== Eredivisie (2007–2012) ===
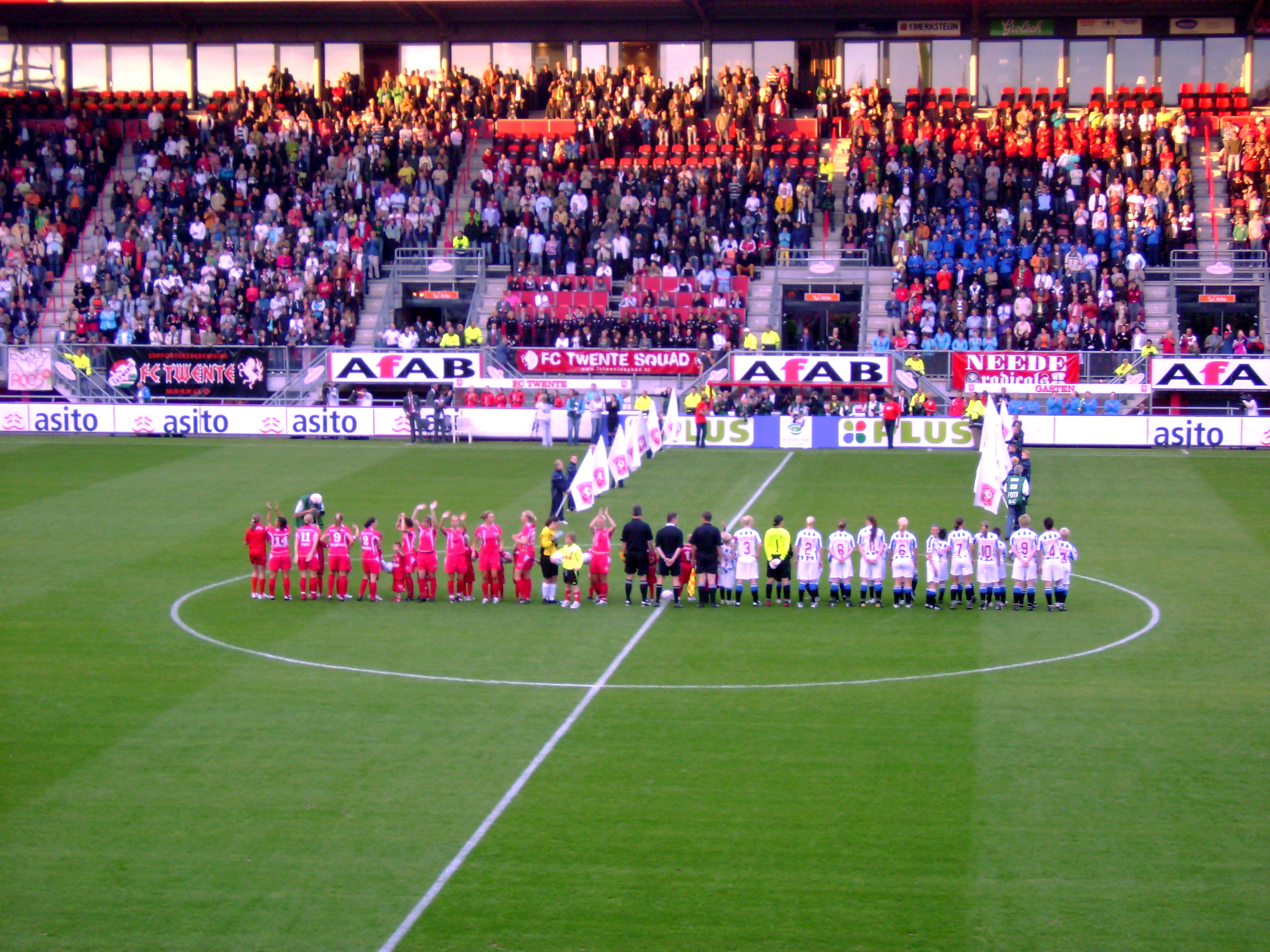
Inaugural Eredivisie match in 2007

For the first Eredivisie season, coach Kok-Willemsen built a 22 player squad formed with eight players coming from Be Quick '28, two players from the Belgian First Division, and three players from the German Bundesliga.

The club played its first official match on 29 August 2007, also the first-ever Eredivisie game at home at the Arke Stadion in front of 5.500 spectators, losing 2–3 to SC Heerenveen. Despite having a poor 2007–08 league season, finishing in fifth place (out of six teams), the club had a good run in the KNVB Women's Cup (Dutch Cup), winning its first trophy by beating FC Utrecht 3–1 in the final.

The 2008–09 season was difficult, as the team had many injured players during the season, and the club finished the league again in fifth place out of seven teams. In the Dutch Cup, the KNVB decided to take all Eredivisie clubs out of the competition in the Round of 16 to have the professional players prepared for the UEFA Euro 2009 tournament.

In the 2009–10 season, ten draws in 20 league matches meant the team was unable to challenge for the title and finished the league in fourth place out of six teams. It reached the semifinals of the Dutch Cup, where it lost to Ter Leede in a penalty shoot-out after a 3–3 draw.

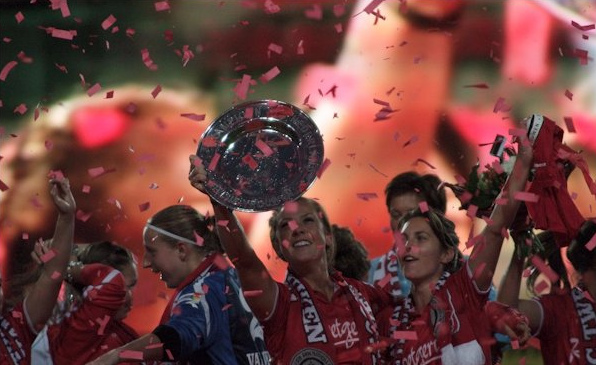
Twente players holding the 2011 Eredivisie trophy

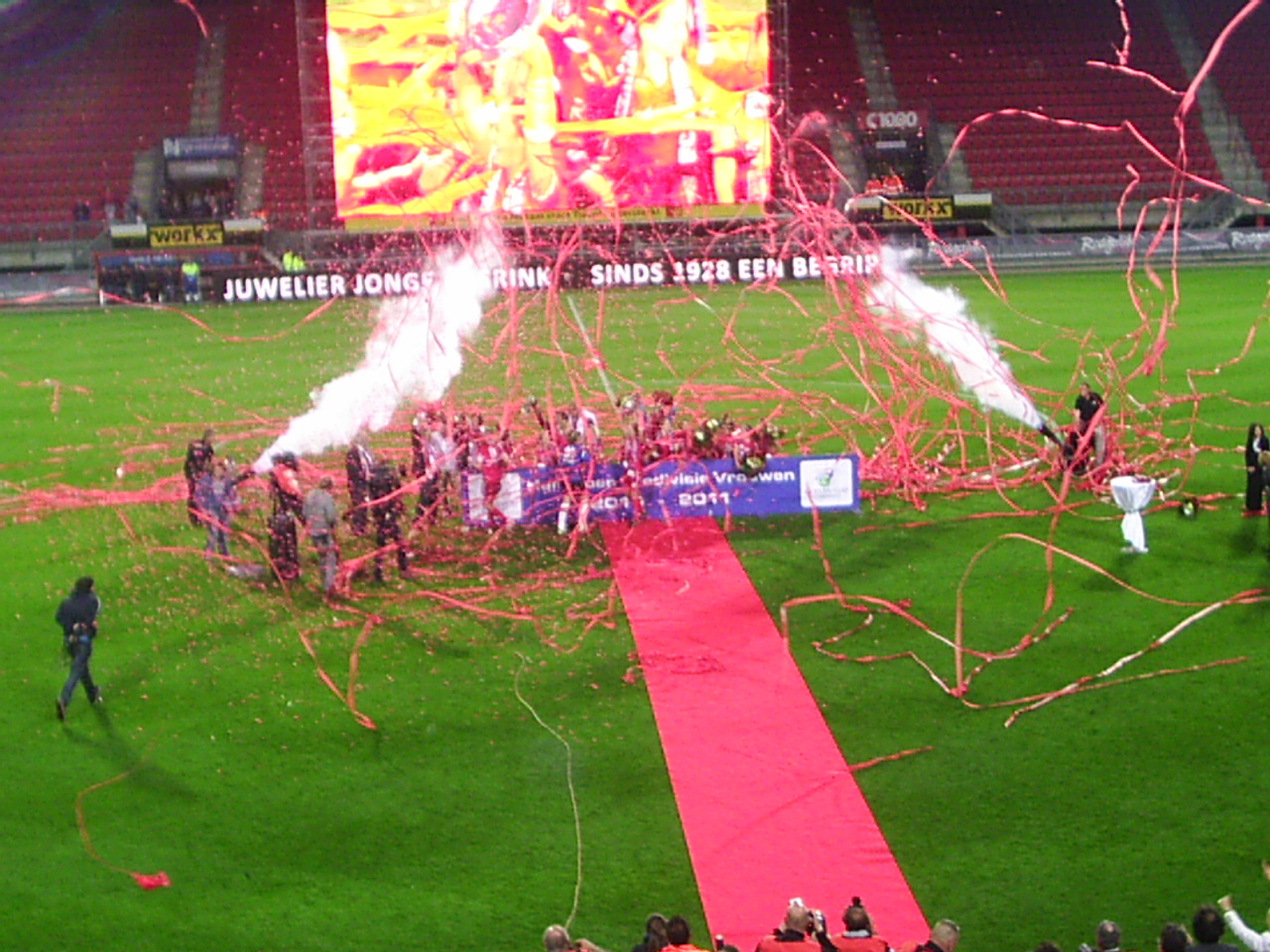
2011 Eredivisie Champions Ceremony

After ending the first three league seasons in the bottom half of the table, the outcome of the 2010–11 season would prove to be different. The club brought in American players Ashley Nick and Caitlin Farrell, new goalkeeper Sari van Veenendaal, and striker Joyce Mijnheer. The team had a strong season, leading the league at the winter break. The team clinched its first title on the last matchday, in a home match at the Grolsch Veste in front of over 7.000 spectators, a 4–1 win over Willem II, ending AZ Alkmaar's three-year championship run. Along with the title, the team qualified for next season's UEFA Champions League. In the Dutch Cup, the team was eliminated in the quarterfinals.

There were changes ahead of the 2011–12 season. Kok-Willemsen took a different role at the club, and John van Miert was appointed as the new coach. The team started league play well, taking all points available from the first four matches and in second place at the winter break, one point behind leaders ADO Den Haag. During that break, van Miert took a different function at the club, and Arjan Veurink became the team's coach. In the second half of the season, ADO Den Haag extended its lead, and Twente finished in second place, 14 points back. The club debut in European competitions in the 2011–12 UEFA Champions League came on 28 September 2011 at De Adelaarshorst in Deventer, a 0–2 first leg defeat to Russian champions WFC Rossiyanka in the Round of 32. Twente also lost the second leg to the Russian team, 1–0. The team also reached the Dutch Cup semifinals that season and played the BeNe Super Cup, a match between the Dutch and Belgian league champions, losing 1–4 against Standard Liège.

=== BeNe League (2012–2015) ===
In 2012, the BeNe League was created when the Dutch and Belgian domestic leagues merged. With the departures of Ashley Nick, Blakely Mattern, Joyce Mijnheer, and Lorca Van De Putte before the season and Courtney Goodson in the winter break, the team brought in Sherida Spitse and Jill Roord. The 2012–13 BeNe League was played in two stages, the first had a group of eight Dutch teams (BeNe League Orange), and FC Twente topped the group without losing a match. The second stage had the top four teams of the Dutch group and the top four teams from the Belgian group forming a new group (BeNe League A) to play for the championship. Twente won the Dutch championship, awarded to the best Dutch team in the BeNe League, on 10 May 2013, qualifying for Champions League participation the following season. It became the first BeNe League champions on 25 May 2013 in the last round of the season in a straight championship match against Standard Liège, which came into the match one point ahead of FC Twente. At the Grolsch Veste in front of 9.000 spectators, FC Twente came from behind to win the match 3–1. The Tukkers narrowly missed a double, losing the Dutch Cup final on penalties to ADO Den Haag.

The 2013–14 BeNe League season was played with all 15 teams, eight Dutch and seven Belgian, in a single group. Despite many player changes during the season and the removal of FC Utrecht from the league due to bankruptcy in the winter break, the club had a strong league performance, winning the Dutch championship (as best Dutch club in the league) on 16 May 2014 and eventually winning the BeNe League title on 6 June 2014, after a 7–0 win against Club Brugge. The team negotiated well the qualifying round of the 2013–14 UEFA Champions League, winning two and losing one match to reach the Round of 32 where they drew French champions Olympique Lyon, which proved to be too strong, winning both legs by a 10–0 aggregate. The team reached the Dutch Cup semifinal, where it was beaten by Ajax 0–2.

The club finished second in the 2014–15 BeNe League, two points behind Standard Liège. Despite missing a third BeNe League title it won the Dutch championship (as best Dutch club in the league) for the third consecutive year on 28 April 2015, after a 4–0 win over Anderlecht In the 2014–15 UEFA Champions League, the club drew French team Paris Saint-Germain as opponents in the Round of 32 and lost both legs (1–2 and 0–1). The club won its second Dutch Cup, defeating Ajax 3–2 in the final.

=== Eredivisie (2015–present) ===
In 2015, the BeNe League dissolved, and the Eredivisie was re-introduced. The club won the Dutch championship for the fourth consecutive year after a 3–0 win over PEC Zwolle on 20 May 2016. In the 2015–16 UEFA Champions League, three wins in the qualification round got the team to the Round of 32, being drawn to play against German club Bayern Munich. After a 1–1 first leg draw at home in the Grolsch Veste, the team drew the second leg 2–2 in Germany, advancing on away goals rule to the Round of 16 for the first time. The next opponents Spanish club Barcelona won both legs (0–1 and 0–1) in the Round of 16. In the Dutch Cup, the team was eliminated by Ajax on penalty shoot-out, following a 0–0 draw in the quarterfinals.

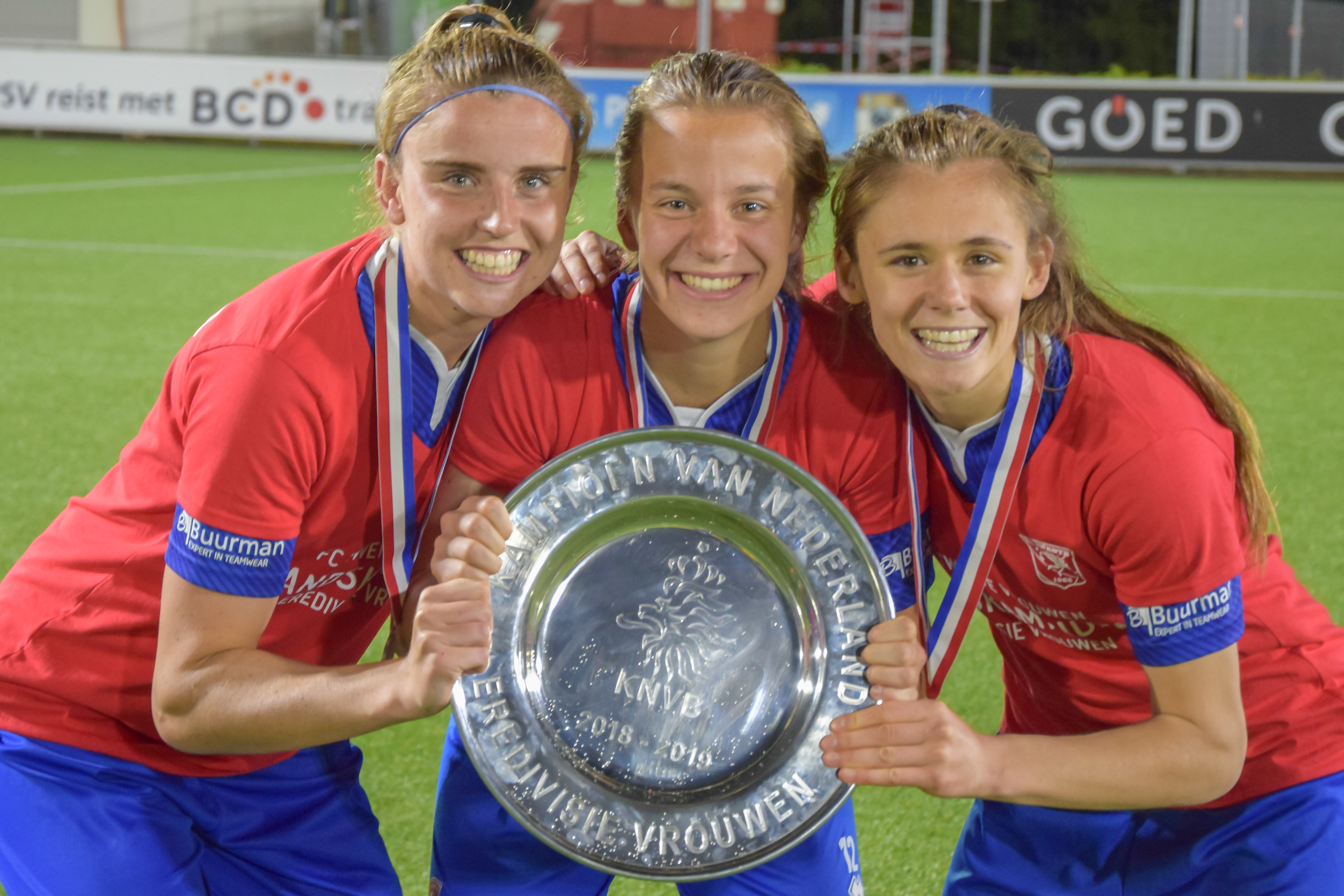
Myrthe Moorrees, Lynn Wilms and Joëlle Smits (L-R) celebrating with the Eredivisie championship shield in 2019

Ahead of the 2016–17 season, Tommy Stroot was appointed as coach. The club ended the 2016–17 Eredivisie as runners-up behind Ajax. At the 2016–17 UEFA Champions League, three wins in the qualification round got the team to the Round of 32, being drawn to play against Czech club Sparta Praha. In the first leg at home, the club won its first Champions League main tournament match by 2–0, and, after a 3–1 win on the second leg, advanced to the Round of 16 for the second time. The club next faced Spanish club Barcelona for the second consecutive year in the Round of 16. After losing both legs (0–1 and 0–4) it was eliminated from the competition. In the Dutch Cup, the team lost 2–3 to PEC Zwolle in the quarterfinals.

In the 2017–18 season, Twente was in first place at the end of the regular season portion of the competition, but finished second in the championship playoff to Ajax. Joëlle Smits led the team with 20 goals.

FC Twente returned to the top of the league in the 2018–19 season, earning is sixth national championship. Smits again led the team in scoring with 25 goals in Eredivisie play, and Renate Jansen had 18 goals. The two forwards combined for 61 percent of the team's 70 goals. By winning the league title, the club qualified for the 2019–20 UEFA Champions League. In the Dutch Cup, Twente lost in the quarterfinals to Feyenoord, 0–3.

In the 2019–20 UEFA Champions League, Twente hosted its qualifying round group at the Sportpark Schreurserve in August 2019, prior to Eredivisie league play. Twente won its group, defeating Armenian club Alashkert 8–0, drawing with Turkish club Beşiktaş, then defeating Polish club Górnik Łęczna 2–0 to qualify for the 32-team knockout bracket. Twente drew Austrian club St. Pölten. Each team won on the road, with Twente winning in St. Pölten 4–2, with new striker Fenna Kalma scoring a hat trick. St. Pölten won in Enschede 2–1, and Twente advanced on aggregate goals, 5–4. In the round of 16, Twente lost to VfL Wolfsburg by an aggregate goal score of 7–0.

The 2019–20 Eredivisie season was suspended in March 2020 due to the COVID-19 pandemic, and no league champion was crowned. When matches were halted, Twente was in third place, two points behind Ajax. That finish meant Twente did not qualify for the following year's Champions League. In the Dutch Cup, Twente won its only match, defeating lower-level club Nooit Gedacht of Geffen 12–0 in the round of 16. A quarterfinal match against SC Heerenveen planned for March 2020 was suspended due to the COVID-19 pandemic.

In 2020–2021, Twente returned to the top, narrowly. After the first half of the season, Twente was in first place by one point over PSV, which along with Ajax were clear top three teams in the league, based on results. After the championship playoff, Twente again held a one-point lead over PSV, and the two teams qualified for the 2021–22 UEFA Champions League. Twente clinched the title in the penultimate week, defeating the weaker ADO Den Haag as Ajax bested PSV. Twente had three of the four top goal scorers in the league, in Renate Jansen, Fenna Kalma, and Anna–Lena Stolze, respectively. All three players averaged more than one goal per two games. All three trailed the team's former top scorer, Joëlle Smits, who had transferred to PSV in 2019. In mid-2021, Stroot left to coach VfL Wolfsburg.

Twente again won the Eredivisie in the 2021–22 season under new coach Robert de Pauw. The league switched to a triple round robin schedule, ending the championship playoff round format. Twente finished six points clear of Ajax and led the league by scoring 95 goals in 24 matches. The 26 goals conceded was second only to Ajax. Kalma led the league with 33 goals, which tied or bested the goal count of the bottom five teams in the standings. She had four hat tricks, a total matched by all the other players in the league. Jansen had 17 goals and Kayleigh van Dooren had 13 goals, ranking third and fourth in the league, respectively. In Champions League play, Twente hosted and won its first round of the Champions Path qualifying, defeating Tbilisi Nike and Spartak Subotica in August, before the start of the Eredivisie regular season. However, Twente lost to Benfica in the second round, with the decisive match being a 4–0 loss in the second leg in Seixal, Portugal. In that game, Twente conceded a hat trick to Benfica's Cloé Lacasse. Twente also lost early in the KNVB Women's Cup. de Pauw lasted just one season with the club, moving on to coach German club Bayer 04 Leverkusen.

Joran Pot was announced as the team's coach on 26 January 2022, coming from PEC Zwolle. Pot won several championships, including a treble in his final season in 2024–25, before leaving to coach the Dutch under-16 national boys team. Corina Dekker became the team's new coach in 2025.

== Competitive record ==
=== Eredivisie / BeNe League ===
5	5	4	1	2	1	1	2	1	2	2	1	3^{a}	1	1	2	1	1
08	09	10	11	12	13	14	15	16	17	18	19	20	21	22	23	24	25
Women's eredivisie / BeNe League

a=at moment of abandonment due to COVID-19

Season	Division	Position	W – D – L = Pts	GF – GA	Top scorer	KNVB Cup
2007–08	Eredivisie	5/6	7 –3 – 10 = 24	27 – 36	Smit (10)	Champions
2008–09	Eredivisie	5/7	10 –3 – 11 = 33	28 – 30	Pieëte (11)	
2009–10	Eredivisie	4/6	5 – 10 – 5 = 25	29 – 32	de Kort (6)	Semifinals
2010–11	Eredivisie	1/8	13 –5 –3 = 44	39 – 20	Pieëte (10)	Quarterfinals
2011–12	Eredivisie	2/7	10 –3 –5 = 33	31 – 22	Heuver (6)	Semifinals
2012–13	BeNe League	1/ 16	21 –4 –3 = 67	70 – 22	Spitse (16)	Finalist
2013–14	BeNe League	1/ 14	21 –2 –3 = 65	104 – 20	E. Jansen (27)	Semifinals
2014–15	BeNe League	2/ 13^{a}	20 –2 –2 = 62	71 – 16	E. Jansen, Dekker (14)	Champions
2015–16	Eredivisie	1/7	18 –2 –4 = 56	79 – 21	Roord (20)	Quarterfinals
2016–17	Eredivisie	2/8	17 –6 –4 = 57	74 – 29	E. Jansen (20)	Quarterfinals
2017–18	Eredivisie	2/9	17 –3 –4 = 54	70 – 30	Smits (20)	Round of 16
2018–19	Eredivisie	1/9	16 –5 –3 = 51	70 – 27	Smits (25)	Semifinals
2019–20	Eredivisie	3/ 8^{b}	7 –2 –3 =23^{b}	28 –15^{b}	Kalma (9)	Quarterfinals^{b}
2020–21	Eredivisie	1/8	14 –3 –3 = 45	54 – 19	R. Jansen (12)	Semifinals
2021–22	Eredivisie	1/9	19 –3 –2 = 60	95 – 26	Kalma (33)	Quarterfinals
2022–23	Eredivisie	2/11	18 –0 –2 = 54	81 – 6	Kalma (30)	Champions
2023–24	Eredivisie	1/ 12	18 –2 –2 = 60	56 – 21	Rijsbergen (10)	Quarterfinals
2024–25	Eredivisie	1/ 12	18 –3 –1 = 57	69 – 19	Ravensbergen (23)	Champions

a=national champion by virtue of being the highest ranked Dutch club, b=at moment of abandonment due to COVID-19

=== UEFA Women's Champions League ===
All results (away, home and aggregate) list Twente's goal tally first.

Season	Round	Club	Away	Home	Agg (Note: or single match when home and away are empty)
2011–12	Round of 32	(Russia) Rossiyanka Khimki	0–1	0–2 (Note: first leg)	0–3
2013–14	Qualifying round	(Malta) Birkirkara			6–0
2013–14	Qualifying round	(Croatia) ŽNK Osijek			4–0
2013–14	Qualifying round	(Scotland) Glasgow City			0–2
2013–14	Round of 32	(France) Olympique Lyon	0–6	0–4	0–10
2014–15	Round of 32	(France) Paris Saint-Germain	0–1	1–2	1–3
2015–16	Qualifying round	(Hungary) Ferencváros			2–0
2015–16	Qualifying round	(Luxembourg) Jeunesse Junglinster			10–0
2015–16	Qualifying round	(Israel) Tel Aviv University			7–0
2015–16	Round of 32	(Germany) Bayern Munich	2–2	1–1	3–3 (agr)
2015–16	Round of 16	(Spain) FC Barcelona	0–1	0–1	0–2
2016–17	Qualifying round	(Hungary) Ferencváros			2–1
2016–17	Qualifying round	(Malta) Hibernians Paola			9–0
2016–17	Qualifying round	(Turkey) Konak İzmir			6–2
2016–17	Round of 32	(Czech Republic) Sparta Prague	3–1	2–0	5–1
2016–17	Round of 16	(Spain) FC Barcelona	0–1	0–4	0–5
2019–20	Qualifying round	(Turkey) Beşiktaş			2–2
2019–20	Qualifying round	(Armenia) FC Alashkert			8–0
2019–20	Qualifying round	(Poland) Górnik Łęczna			2–0
2019–20	Round of 32	(Austria) St. Pölten	4–2	1–2	5–4
2019–20	Round of 16	(Germany) Wolfsburg	0–6	0–1	0–7
2021–22	QR 1 semi-final	(Georgia (country)) Tbilisi Nike			9–0
2021–22	QR 1 final	(Serbia) ŽFK Spartak Subotica			5–3 aet
2021–22	QR 2	(Portugal) Benfica	0–4	1–1	1–5
2022–23	QR 1 semi-final	(Moldova) Agarista-ȘS Anenii Noi			13–0
2022–23	QR 1 final	(Portugal) Benfica			1–2
2023–24	QR 1 semi-final	(Austria) Sturm Graz			6–0
2023–24	QR 1 final	(Spain) Levante			3-2
2023–24	QR 2	(Sweden) BK Häcken	1–2	2–2	3–4
2024–25	QR 1semi-final	(Wales) Cardiff City			7–0
2024–25	QR 1 final	(Iceland) Valur			5–0
2024–25	QR 2	(Croatia) ŽNK Osijek	4–1	4–0	8–1
2024–25	Group stage	(England) Chelsea	1–6	1–3	9–19
2024–25	Group stage	(Spain) Real Madrid	0–7	2–3	9–19
2024–25	Group stage	(Scotland) Celtic	2–0	3–0	9–19
2025–26	QR 2 semi-final	(Serbia) Red Star Belgrade			6–0
2025–26	QR 2 final	(Iceland) Breiðablik			2–0
2025–26	QR 3	(Poland) GKS Katowice	4–0		

== Honours ==
National

- Eredivisie
  - Winners (10): 2010–11, 2012–13*, 2013–14*, 2014–15*, 2015–16, 2018–19, 2021, 2021–22, 2023–24, 2024–25
- BeNe League
  - Winners (2): 2012–13, 2013–14
- KNVB Women's Cup
  - Winners (4): 2007–08, 2014–15, 2022–23, 2024–25, 2025-26
- Dutch Women's Super Cup
  - Winners (4): 2022, 2023, 2024, 2025
- Eredivisie Cup
  - Winners (4): 2019–20, 2021–22, 2022–23, 2023–24
- BeNe Super Cup
  - Runner-up (1): 2011

*The KNVB considers the highest placed Dutch team in the BeNe League (2012 to 2015) to be the national champion.

== Players ==
=== Current squad ===
As of 8 July 2026.

Note: Flags indicate national team as defined under FIFA eligibility rules; some limited exceptions apply. Players may hold more than one non-FIFA nationality.

No.	Pos.	Nation	Player
1	GK	BEL	Diede Lemey
2	MF	NED	Imre van der Vegt
3	MF	NED	Ilham Abali
5	DF	NED	Anna Knol
6	MF	NED	Lynn Groenewegen
7	FW	NED	Charlotte Hulst
8	MF	NED	Danique van Ginkel
9	FW	NED	Jaimy Ravensbergen
10	MF	NED	Jill Roord
11	DF	NED	Alieke Tuin
12	DF	NED	Leonie Vliek

No.	Pos.	Nation	Player
15	MF	NED	Jill Diekman
17	MF	ISL	Amanda Andradóttir
18	DF	NED	Sophie te Brake
20	FW	NED	Nikée van Dijk
21	FW	NED	Eva Oude Elberink
22	GK	NED	Fiene Bussman
23	MF	NED	Suus Verdaasdonk
26	GK	NED	Kiki Vissers
33	FW	BEL	Ella Van Kerkhoven

=== Former players ===
Internationals (former and current players)

- Netherlands: Eshly Bakker, Lineth Beerensteyn, Marloes de Boer, Marije Brummel, Kerstin Casparij, Anouk Dekker, Daphne van Domselaar, Kayleigh van Dooren, Caitlin Dijkstra, Kika van Es, Cheyenne van den Goorbergh, Stefanie van der Gragt, Maayke Heuver, Ellen Jansen, Renate Jansen, Daniëlle de Jong, Fenna Kalma, Wieke Kaptein, Danique Kerkdijk, Myrthe Moorrees, Marthe Munsterman, Sisca Folkertsma, Marisa Olislagers, Marlous Pieëte, Mirte Roelvink, Jill Roord, Shanice van de Sanden, Sylvia Smit, Sherida Spitse, Sari van Veenendaal, Kirsten van de Ven, Ashleigh Weerden, Lynn Wilms, Siri Worm
- Belgium: Yana Daniëls, Nicky Evrard, Diede Lemey, Lenie Onzia, Lorca van de Putte, Jarne Teulings, Elena Dhont
- Australia: Daniela Galic
- Iceland: Amanda Andradóttir
- Norway: Andrine Tomter
- Switzerland: Nora Häuptle
- Slovenia: Kristina Erman
- Tunisia: Sabrine Ellouzi
- Wales: Olivia Clark

== Coaching staff ==
Position	Staff
Head coach	(Netherlands) Corina Dekker
Assistant Coach	(Netherlands) Kirsten Bakker
Assistant Coach	(Netherlands) René Nijhuis

== Head coaches ==
- (Netherlands) Mary Kok-Willemsen (2007–2011)
- (Netherlands) John van Miert (2011–2012)
- (Netherlands) Arjan Veurink (2012–2016)
- (Germany) Tommy Stroot (2016–2021)
- (Netherlands) Robert de Pauw (2021–2022)
- (Netherlands) Joran Pot (2022–2025)
- (Netherlands) Corina Dekker (2025–present)
