= Marlous Pieëte =

Dutch association footballer (born 1989)

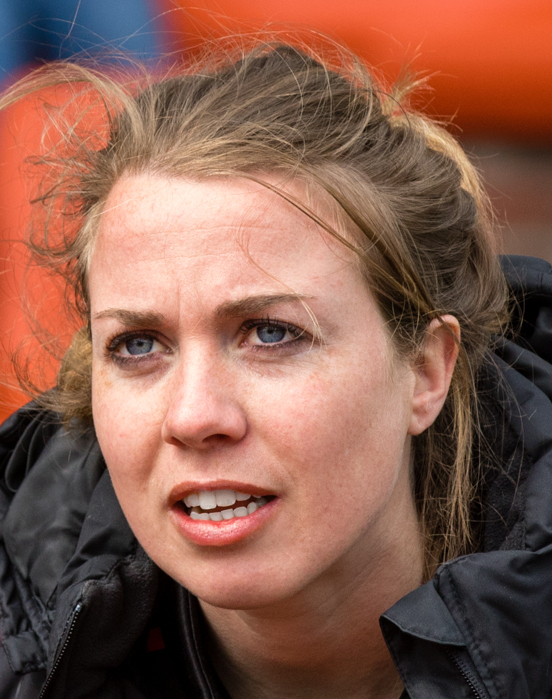
- Pieëte in 2016

Personal information
- Date of birth: 19 July 1989 (age 37)
- Place of birth: Naarden, Netherlands
- Height: 1.70 m (5 ft 7 in)
- Positions: Midfielder; striker

Youth career
- VVOG

Senior career*
Years	Team	Apps	(Gls)
2006–2007	Be Quick '28		
2007–2014	Twente	125	(49)
2014–2017	Ajax	64	(18)
2017–2018	Western Sydney Wanderers	12	(1)

International career
2004	Netherlands U15	2	(0)
2005–2006	Netherlands U17	4	(1)
2006–2008	Netherlands U19	14	(10)
2009–2014	Netherlands	51	(8)
- * Club domestic league appearances and goals as of 20 February 2018

Marlous Pieëte (born 19 July 1989 in Naarden) is a Dutch female retired footballer who played either as a midfielder or as a striker for Western Sydney Wanderers in the Australian W-League and international football for the Netherlands women's national football team.

== Club career ==
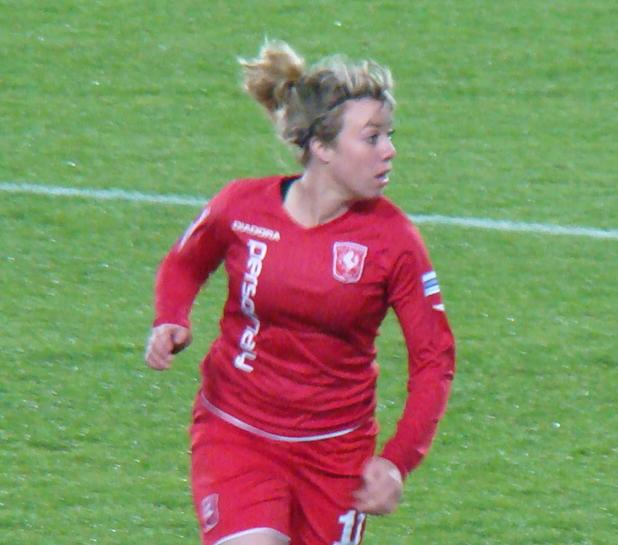
Pieëte playing for Twente in 2010

Pieëte began her career as a junior with VVOG, she progressed through the teams (from team E1 to B1) only leaving to join Be Quick '28 who were at the time playing at the highest level of women's football in the Netherlands.

When the Dutch women's professional league (Eredivisie) was launched in 2007, Pieëte joined FC Twente. At the end of her seven seasons with the club, she had won many titles (Eredivisie, BeNe League and Dutch Cup) as well as played in the UEFA Women's Champions League.

In 2014, Pieëte moved to Ajax and played three seasons at the club, winning the Eredivisie and Cup titles in her last season at the club.

Pieëte joined Australian W-League team Western Sydney Wanderers ahead of the 2017–18 season.

In March 2018, Pieëte retired from football.

== International career ==
Pieëte represented the Netherlands at Under-17 and Under-19 level. She made her debut for the Netherlands senior team on 5 March 2009 against Russia in the 2009 Cyprus Cup. She was selected for the 2009 European Championships squad, playing three times and scoring in the semi-final as the Netherlands lost to England.

In June 2013 national team coach Roger Reijners selected Pieëte in the final Netherlands squad for UEFA Women's Euro 2013 in Sweden, but sustained a knee injury on the eve of the tournament and was ruled out of the tournament.

=== International goals ===
Scores and results list the Netherlands goal tally first.

Goal	Date	Venue	Opponent	Score	Result	Competition
1.	11 July 2009	Olympic Stadium, Amsterdam, Netherlands	Switzerland	4–0	5–0	Four Nations Cup
2.	6 September 2009	Ratina Stadion, Tampere, Finland	England	1–1	1–2	UEFA Women's Euro 2009
3.	24 February 2010	GSP Stadium, Nicosia, Cyprus	Scotland	4–1	4–1	2010 Cyprus Cup
4.	22 April 2010	Gradski Stadion, Kumanovo, Macedonia	North Macedonia	2–0	7–0	2011 FIFA Women's World Cup qualification
5.	13 June 2010	MAC³PARK Stadion, Zwolle, Netherlands	Belgium	2–0	4–1	Friendly
6.	15 August 2010	TATA Steel Stadion, Velsen-Zuid, Netherlands	Republic of Ireland	1–0	2–0	Friendly
7.	5 April 2013	Silkeborg Stadium, Silkeborg, Denmark	Denmark	1–0	1–0	Friendly
8.	7 March 2014	GSP Stadium, Nicosia, Cyprus	Scotland	1–3	3–4	2014 Cyprus Cup

== Honours ==
Twente

- BeNe League (2): 2012–13, 2013–14
- Eredivisie (3): 2010–11, 2012–13*, 2013–14*
- KNVB Women's Cup (1): 2007–08

*During the BeNe League period (2012 to 2015), the highest placed Dutch team is considered as national champion by the Royal Dutch Football Association.

Ajax

- Eredivisie (1): 2016–17
- KNVB Women's Cup (1): 2016–17
