= Ella Van Kerkhoven =

Belgian footballer (born 1993)

Personal information
- Full name: Ella Van Kerkhoven
- Date of birth: 20 November 1993 (age 32)
- Place of birth: Leuven, Belgium
- Position: Forward

Team information
- Current team: Feyenoord
- Number: 33

Senior career*
Years	Team	Apps	(Gls)
2012–2015	Oud-Heverlee Leuven	67	(8)
2015–2019	Anderlecht		(27)
2019–2020	Inter Milan	9	(1)
2020–2021	Gent	13	(8)
2021–2022	Anderlecht	4	(2)
2022–2023	OH Leuven	25	(21)
2023–2024	Genk	4	(6)
2024–2026	Feyenoord	34	(16)
2026–	FC Twente		

International career^{‡}
2011–2012	Belgium U19	17	(1)
2018–	Belgium	27	(15)
- * Club domestic league appearances and goals as of 28 May 2024 (UTC) ‡ National team caps and goals as of 5 December 2024

Ella Van Kerkhoven (born 20 November 1993) is a Belgian professional footballer who plays as a forward for Eredivisie club FC Twente and the Belgium national team. She previously played for Oud-Heverlee Leuven, RSC Anderlecht in Belgium, as well as Inter Milan in Italy and Feyenoord in the Netherlands.

== Club career ==
Van Kerkhoven started her career with Oud-Heverlee Leuven and joined Anderlecht in 2015. During the 2017–18 season, she was the league's top goalscorer with 29 goals in 25 games. In August 2019, Van Kerkhoven transferred to Inter Milan of the Italian Serie A. before returning to Anderlecht on 21 June 2021. On 20 June 2022, Van Kerkhoven was announced at Oud-Heverlee Leuven.

On 1 February 2024, Van Kerkhoven was announced at Feyenoord on an eighteen-month contract.

== International career ==
Van Kerkhoven made her debut for the Belgium national team on 31 August 2018, in a 1–0 win over Romania in Botoșani. She scored the winning goal after entering play as a second half substitute.

She was named in the Belgium squad for UEFA Women's Euro 2022 in England, where the Red Flames were beaten in the quarter-finals 1–0 by Sweden. She went on to contribute to Belgium's successful qualification for UEFA Women's Euro 2025 via the play-offs, starting both legs of the play-off final against Ukraine, scoring in the 2-0 first-leg victory in Antalya.

On 11 June 2025, Van Kerkhoven was called up to the Belgium squad for the UEFA Women's Euro 2025.

== Personal life ==
Van Kerkhoven is in a relationship with Belgian footballer Diede Lemey. She is not related to former Belgian international Nico Van Kerkhoven.

== Career statistics ==
=== International ===
: As of match played 29 November 2024[13]

List of international goals scored by Ella Van Kerkhoven
G	C	Date	Venue	Opponent	Score	Result	Competition
1	1	31 August 2018	Stadionul Municipal, Botoșani, Romania	Romania	0–1	0–1	2019 FIFA Women's World Cup qualification
2	9	24 May 2019	Municipal Stadium, Pylos, Greece	Greece	0–1	1–2	Friendly
3	10	1 June 2019	Den Dreef, Leuven, Belgium	Thailand	1–0	6–1	Friendly
4	10	1 June 2019	Den Dreef, Leuven, Belgium	Thailand	3–0	6–1	Friendly
5	10	1 June 2019	Den Dreef, Leuven, Belgium	Thailand	4–0	6–1	Friendly
6	11	29 August 2019	Den Dreef, Leuven, Belgium	England	2–2	3–3	Friendly
7	11	29 August 2019	Den Dreef, Leuven, Belgium	England	3–2	3–3	Friendly
8	16	23 June 2022	Herman Vanderpoortenstadion, Lier, Belgium	Northern Ireland	2–1	4–1	Friendly
9	16	23 June 2022	Herman Vanderpoortenstadion, Lier, Belgium	Northern Ireland	4–1	4–1	Friendly
10	21	6 September 2022	FFA Academy Stadium, Armenia	Armenia	0–2	0–7	2023 FIFA Women's World Cup qualification
11	21	6 September 2022	FFA Academy Stadium, Armenia	Armenia	0–5	0–7	2023 FIFA Women's World Cup qualification
12	21	6 September 2022	FFA Academy Stadium, Armenia	Armenia	0–6	0–7	2023 FIFA Women's World Cup qualification
13	23	12 November 2022	Joseph Marien Stadium, Brussels, Belgium	Slovakia	7–0	7–0	Friendly
14	25	29 October 2024	Den Dreef, Leuven, Belgium	Greece	1–0	5–0	UEFA Women's Euro 2025 qualifying play-offs
15	25	29 October 2024	Den Dreef, Leuven, Belgium	Greece	5–0	5–0	UEFA Women's Euro 2025 qualifying play-offs
16	26	29 November 2024	Mardan Sports Complex, Antalya, Turkey	Ukraine	1–0	2–0	UEFA Women's Euro 2025 qualifying play-offs
