= Diede Lemey =

Belgian footballer (born 1996)

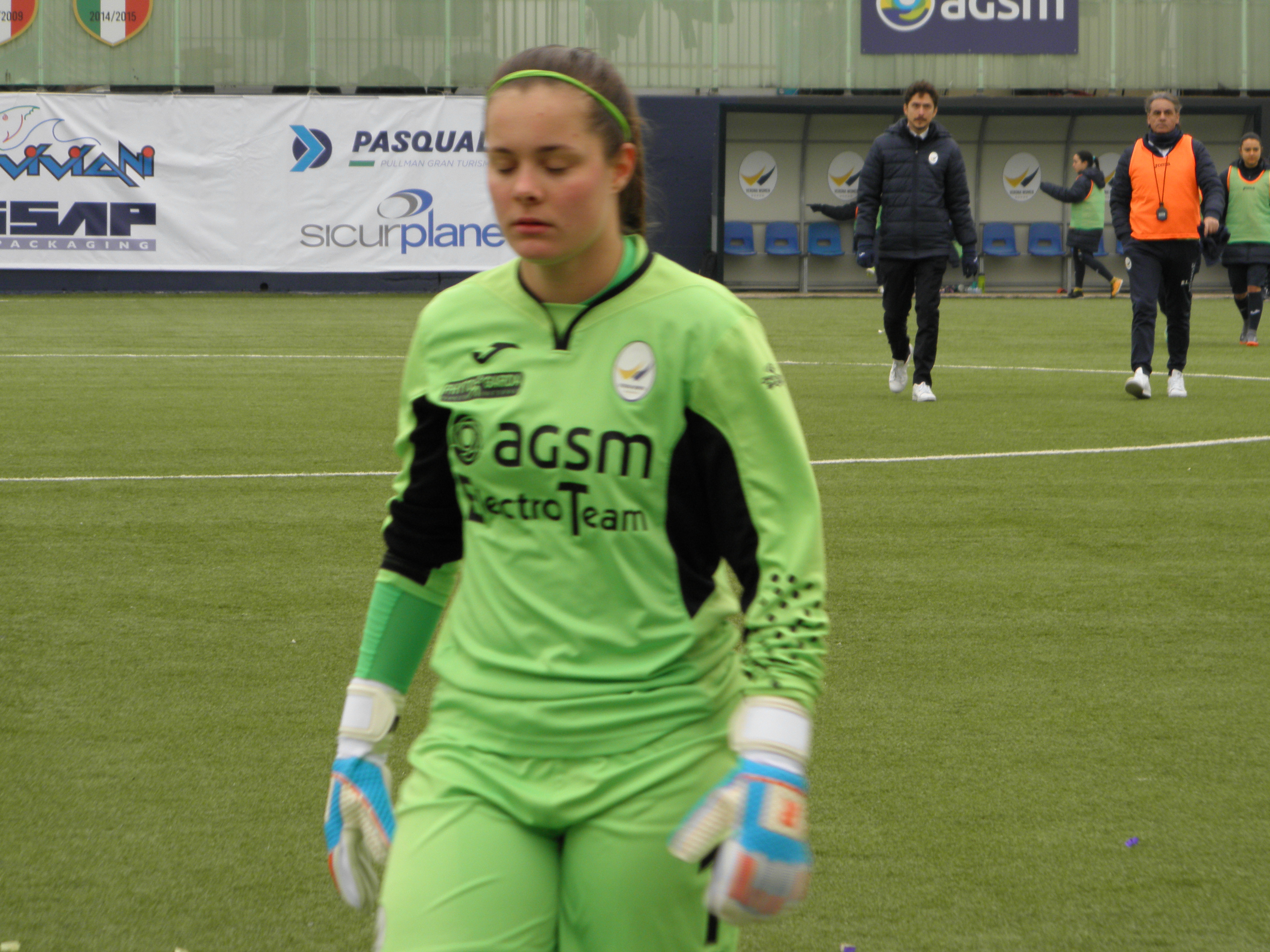
- Lemey in 2018

Personal information
- Date of birth: 7 October 1996 (age 30)
- Place of birth: Tielt, Belgium
- Height: 1.69 m (5 ft 7 in)
- Position: Goalkeeper

Team information
- Current team: FC Twente
- Number: 16

Youth career
- O.M.S. Ingelmunster
- FC Meulebeke

Senior career*
Years	Team	Apps	(Gls)
2009–2012	VK Dames Egem		
2012–2017	RSC Anderlecht	64	(0)
2017–2018	Verona	20	(0)
2018–2019	Atalanta Mozzanica	22	(0)
2019–2022	Sassuolo	31	(0)
2022–2024	Fortuna Sittard	38	(0)
2024–2025	Werder Bremen	0	(0)
2025–	FC Twente	1	(0)

International career^{‡}
2011	Belgium U15	1	(0)
2011–2013	Belgium U-17	15	(0)
2013–2015	Belgium U19	7	(0)
2017–	Belgium	9 (Note: RBFA lists her caps as 8, however they counted the Pinatar cup game against Slovakia (16 February 2022) in which Lemey did not play)	(0)
- * Club domestic league appearances and goals as of 14:38, 29 January 2025 (UTC) ‡ National team caps and goals as of 28 October 2024

Diede Lemey (born 7 October 1996) is a Belgian footballer who plays as a goalkeeper for Eredivisie (women) club FC Twente. At international level, she has played for the Belgium national team.

== Club career ==
Lemey played youth football at Ingelmunster and FC Meulebeke. In 2009, at the age of 13, she went to VK Dames Egem. In 2012, she signed with RSC Anderlecht. She left for the Italian Serie A in 2017. In 2022, she was awarded "Goalkeeper of the year" in the Serie A, after a series of excellent performances for Sassuolo. Lemey managed nine clean sheets and a save rate of 74.2% that season.

Lemey played for Fortuna Sittard in the Dutch Eridivise beginning in the 2022–23 season. She joined Frauen-Bundesliga club Werder Bremen in August 2024. She served as a backup and did not play in any league matches. She agreed the termination of her contract in January 2025. That month, she agreed to a contract with FC Twente, returning to the Netherlands. She won the Dutch Super Cup and had clean sheets in her first three matches during the qualifying rounds of the 2025–26 UEFA Champions League and allowed one goal in her domestic debut with Twente.

== International career ==
Lemey played for several Belgium youth teams, including the U15, U17, and U19 sides. On 22 November 2014, Lemey was called for the first time for the senior team. However, it was only on 19 January 2017 that she made her debut for her country in a match against France. Lemey was part of the group that represented Belgium at the 2017 Cyprus Women's Cup. She also part of the 23-player squad who went to the UEFA Euro 2017.

She was in the squad as Belgium won the Pinatar Cup in Spain for the first time, beating Russia on penalties in the 2022 final after a 0–0 draw. However, she did not play during the competition.

She was part of the national team at UEFA Euro 2022, watching from the bench.

Lemey went on to contribute to Belgium's successful qualification for UEFA Euro 2025 via the play-offs, as substitute goalkeeper for the Red Flames' qualifying group games.

== Personal life ==
Lemey is in a relationship with Belgian footballer Ella Van Kerkhoven.

== Honours ==
Belgium

- Pinatar Cup: 2022
