= René Roord =

Dutch footballer (born 1964)

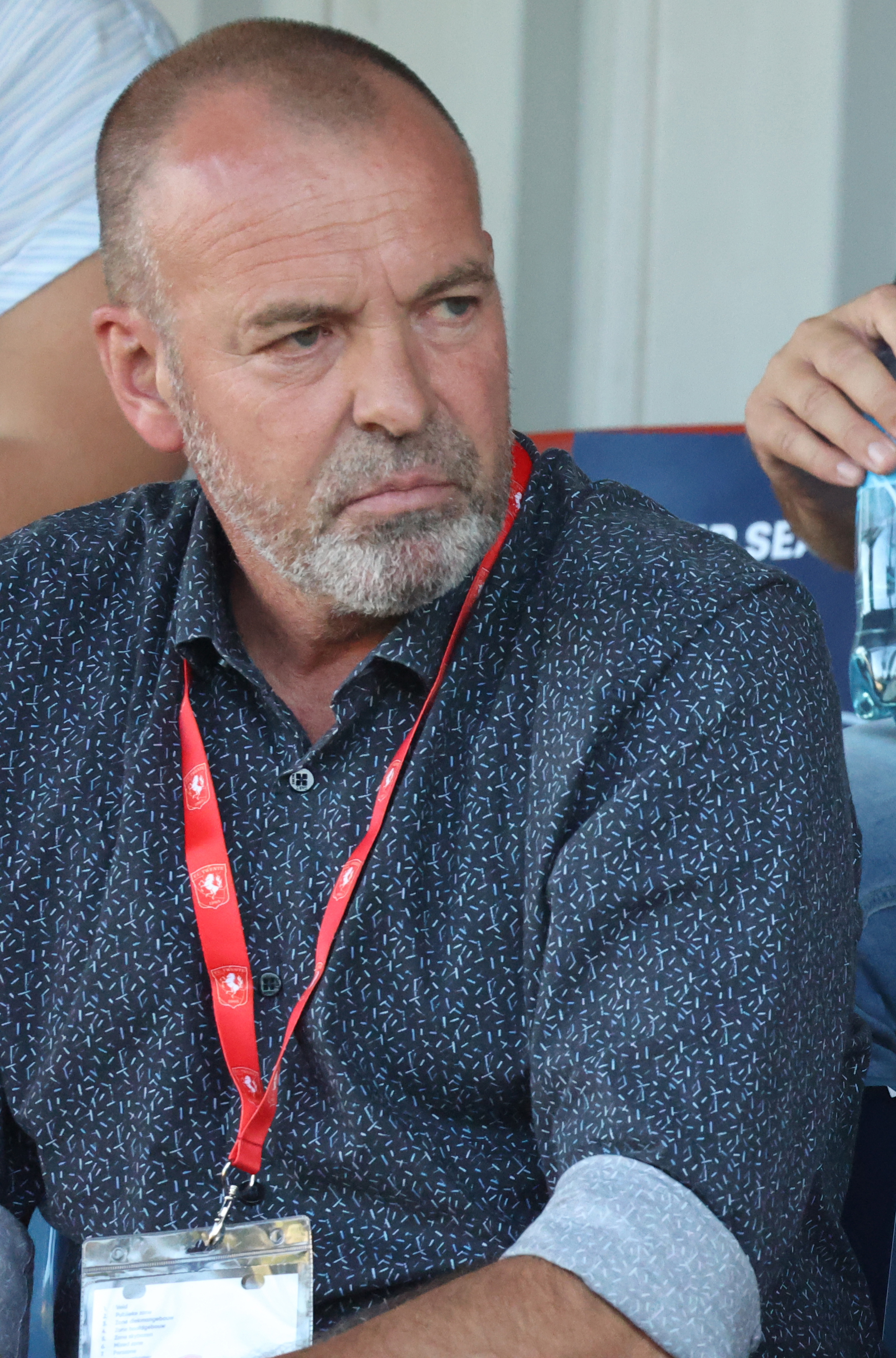

Personal information
- Date of birth: 14 May 1964 (age 62)
- Place of birth: Netherlands
- Position: Midfielder

Senior career*
Years	Team	Apps	(Gls)
1981–1987	FC Twente	55	(3)
1988–1993	Quick '20		
- * Club domestic league appearances and goals

René Roord (born 14 May 1964) is a Dutch football manager and former footballer who is the technical manager of women's team FC Twente.

== Early life ==
Roord was born in 1964 in the Netherlands. He started playing football at the age of five.

== Career ==
Roord is the technical manager of Dutch Eredivsie women's team FC Twente. He helped the club win the league.

== Personal life ==
Roord is the father of Netherlands international Jill Roord. After retiring from professional football, he worked in the insurance industry.
