= Dutch Women's Super Cup =

Women's association football tournament in the Netherlands

Vrouwen Supercup
- Organiser(s): KNVB
- Founded: 2004
- Region: Netherlands
- Teams: 2
- Current champions: PSV Eindhoven (1st title)
- Most championships: Twente (4 titles)
- Website: www.vrouwenvoetbalnederland.nl
- 2026 Dutch Women's Super Cup

The Dutch Women's Super Cup (Dutch: Nederlandse supercup vrouwenvoetbal) is a single match before the start of the football season between the winner of the Eredivisie and the KNVB Women's Cup winner.

== History ==
The Women's Super Cup was first organized by the LOVV in the 2004/05 season. The KNVB (Royal Dutch Football Association) subsequently took over the organization. The first edition was a match between national champions Ter Leede and cup winners SV Saestum, in which Ter Leede won. SV Saestum subsequently won the following two editions, defeating Oranje Nassau and Fortuna Wormerveer respectively. In 2007, Ter Leede won the trophy again as part of a treble, defeating cup finalists RVVH.

=== Introduction of the Eredivisie ===
The Women's Eredivisie was introduced in 2007. Until 2007, the winner of the Hoofdklasse was automatically crowned national champion. In 2008, AZ became the first Eredivisie winner and thus national champion. The 2008 match was scheduled to be between AZ and FC Twente, but was cancelled due to a misunderstanding between amateur football (who had previously organized the match) and professional football.

The KNVB (Royal Dutch Football Association) hoped to resume the event in 2009, but again took no action to organize a Super Cup. AZ, which once again became national champions, would have faced cup winners SV Saestum, who won the cup after the KNVB withdrew all professional football clubs from the cup tournament.

In 2010, AZ and FC Utrecht faced each other on August 27. For the first time in three years, they faced off to see who would take home the Super Cup. FC Utrecht won the match 3–1 after extra time.

Between 2011 and 2013 it was briefly replaced by the BeNe Super Cup.

== Results ==
Year	Winners	Score	Runners-up
2004	Ter Leede	0–0 (5–4 p)	SV Saestum
2005	SV Saestum	8–0	Oranje Nassau
2006	SV Saestum	2–1	Fortuna Wormerveer
2007	Ter Leede	3–0	RVVH
Not held in 2008 and 2009
2007	Ter Leede	3–0	RVVH
2010	FC Utrecht	3–1 (a.e.t.)	AZ
Replaced by the BeNe Super Cup in 2011 and 2012
Not played till 2022
2022	FC Twente	3–2	Ajax
2023	FC Twente	5–2	Ajax
2024	FC Twente	6–1	Ajax
2025	FC Twente	3–2	PSV

== Titles by club ==
Club	Title	Year
FC Twente	4	2022, 2023, 2024, 2025
SV Saestum	2	2005, 2006
Ter Leede	2	2004, 2007
FC Utrecht	1	2010
