= BeNe Super Cup =

- The BeNe Super Cup official logo, in 2011
- Founded: 2011
- Region: Belgium; Netherlands
- Teams: 2
- Current champions: (Belgium) Standard Liège (2nd title)
- Most championships: (Belgium) Standard Liège (2 titles)

The BeNe Super Cup was a women's football competition between the winners of the Dutch Vrouwen Eredivisie and the Belgian Women's First Division. It was played twice.

The inaugural edition took place on 30 August 2011 in Venlo, Netherlands between Standard Liège and FC Twente. Standard won 4-1.

The competition was a first step towards the joint BeNe League that gathered the top eight teams from each country and was started in the 2012–13 season and lasted three seasons. The Super Cup has not been held since.

== Finals played ==
30 August 2011
19:30

FC Twente (Netherlands)	1–4	(Belgium) Standard Fémina de Liège
Nick 55'	Report	Zeler 37'; Martens 45+1', 70'; Aga 68'

De Koel, Venlo
Attendance: 2.000
Referee: Sjoukje de Jong

14 August 2012
16:30

ADO Den Haag (Netherlands)	0–1	(Belgium) Standard Fémina de Liège
	Report	Lewerissa 51'

Achter de Kazerne, Mechelen
Attendance: 200
Referee: Virginie Derouaux
