= Myrthe Kemper-Moorrees =

Dutch football midfielder (born 1994)

Myrthe Moorrees
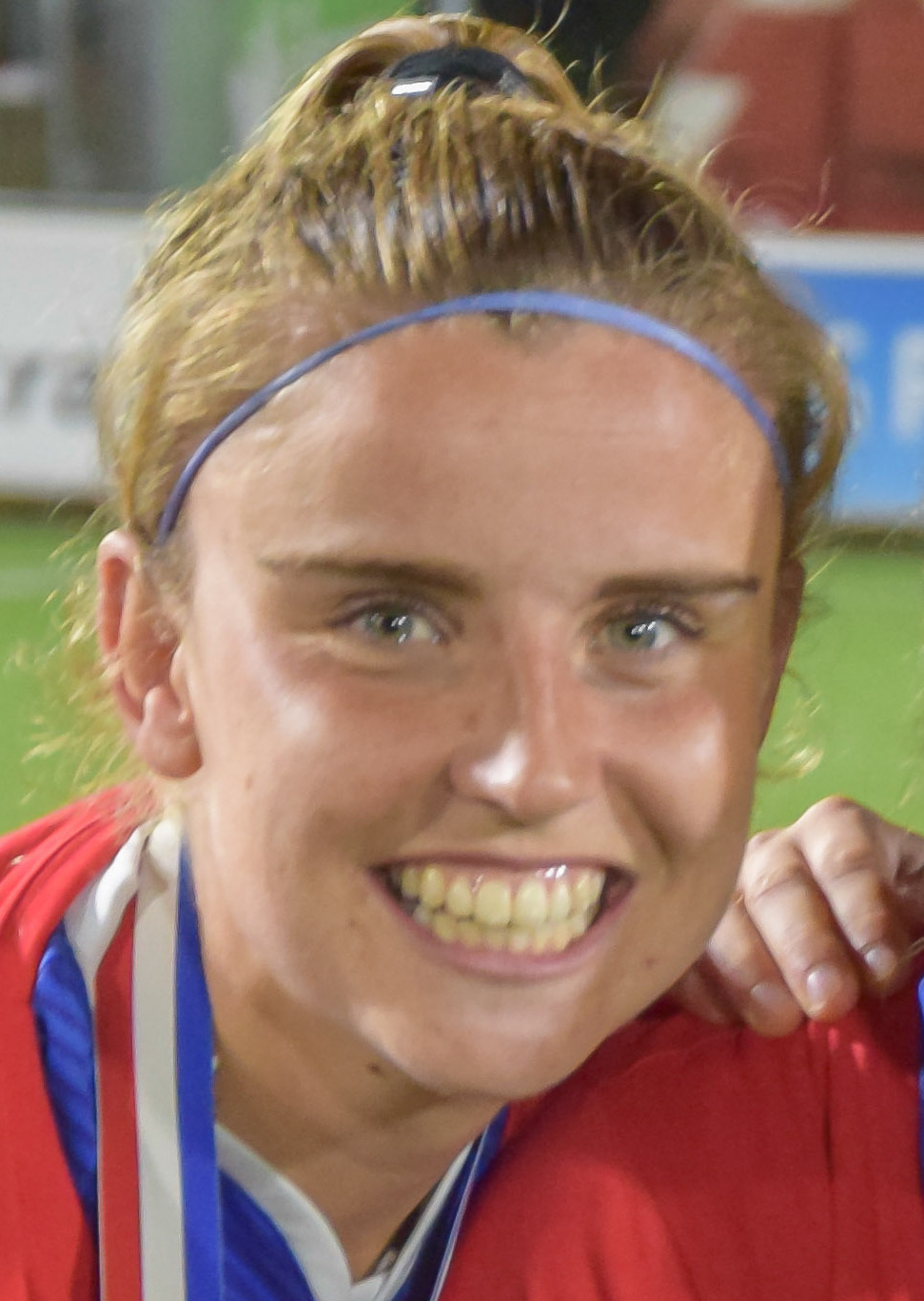
- Moorrees in 2019, with Twente after it became 2018–19 Dutch league champions

Personal information
- Full name: Myrthe Kemper-Moorrees
- Date of birth: 12 December 1994 (age 31)
- Place of birth: Venray, Netherlands
- Positions: Midfielder; centre back

Team information
- Current team: PSV
- Number: 23

Senior career*
Years	Team	Apps	(Gls)
2011–2012	VVV-Venlo	12	(2)
2012–2013	FC Utrecht	39	(4)
2014–2017	PSV Eindhoven	80	(20)
2017–2019	Twente	39	(9)
2019–2021	SC Sand	40	(3)
2021–2023	1. FC Köln	38	(3)
2023–2024	Fortuna Sittard	20	(0)
2024–	PSV	1	(0)

International career^{‡}
2010	Netherlands U17	3	(1)
2011–2013	Netherlands U19	8	(1)
2017–	Netherlands	1	(0)
- * Club domestic league appearances and goals as of 23:28, 7 October 2024 (UTC) ‡ National team caps and goals as of 23 December 2017

Myrthe Kemper-Moorrees (born 12 December 1994) is a Dutch football midfielder who plays for PSV.

== Club career ==
=== VVV-Venlo ===
Moorrees made her league debut against Twente on 2 September 2011. She scored her first league goal against Utrecht on 3 May 2012, scoring in the 5th minute.

=== Utrecht ===
Moorrees made her league debut against Twente on 24 August 2012. She scored her first league goal against PEC Zwolle on 5 October 2012.

=== PSV ===
On 31 January 2014, it was announced that Moorrees had joined PSV. She made her league debut against Alkmaar on 28 February 2014. She scored her first league goals against OH Leuven on 7 November 2014, scoring a brace in the 11th and 36th minute.

=== Twente ===
Moorrees made her league debut against PEC Zwolle on 1 September 2017. She scored her first goal against Ajax on 8 September 2017, scoring in the 78th minute.

=== SC Sand ===
Moorrees made her league debut against Wolfsburg on 18 August 2019. She scored her first league goal against Turbine Potsdam on 17 June 2020, scoring in the 60th minute.

=== Köln ===
Moorrees made her league debut against SGS Essen on 28 August 2021. She scored her first league goal against Turbine Potsdamn on 14 November 2021, scoring in the 22nd minute.

=== Fortuna ===
On 6 June 2023, it was announced that Moorrees had joined Fortuna. She made her league debut against PEC Zwolle on 8 September 2023. On May 27, 2024, Moorees and Fortuna agreed to mutually terminate her contract.

=== Second spell at PSV ===
On 30 June 2024, Kemper-Moorrees was announced at PSV, signing a three-year contract.

== International career ==
On 19 October 2017 she made her debut for the Netherlands women's national football team against Austria.

== Personal life ==
Moorrees was married in 2024, changing her name to Kemper-Moorrees.

== Honours ==
VVV

- KNVB Women's Cup: 2011–12 Runner-up

PSV

- KNVB Women's Cup: 2013–14 Runner-up
