= 2013–14 BeNe League =

Women's BeNe League
- Season: 2013/14
- Champions: Twente
- UEFA Women's Champions League: Standard Liège; Twente
- Matches: 182
- Goals: 719 (3.95 per match)
- Top goalscorer: Vivianne Miedema (41)
- Biggest home win: Standard 13–0 AA Gent
- Biggest away win: AA Gent 0–9 FC Twente
- Highest scoring: Standard 13–0 AA Gent

The 2013–14 season of the Women's BeNe League is the second season of the Belgium and Netherlands' women's football top level league. The defending champion is FC Twente. The season started on 30 August 2013 and is played in a single division contrary to last season.

Originally planned as a 16 team league, one team withdrew before the season and another one withdrew during the season. Thus 14 teams made the final standings.

With six matches to spare Standard Liège already was set as the best placed Belgian side. The league was won by Twente for the second time in a row.

== Format ==
The format with a national stage first and a second joint stage was discarded. The seven Dutch and seven Belgian teams played a double round-robin in which played each other two times, thus each team played 26 matches.

== Teams ==
The league shall be played by eight Dutch and eight Belgian teams. Eight Belgian teams got a licence for the league, some teams need to for file some obligations. Two club did not return in the League, Zulte Waregem did not apply for a license and Beerschot AC didn't get one due to problems of the club in the male league. Shortly before the start Belgium side K. St-Truidense VV did withdraw from the season.

At 21 January the female soccer club FC Utrecht went bankrupt. The team is out of competition and all games played are taken from the scoreboard. They played their last game on 24 January. Royal Antwerp also left the BeNe League for financial reasons after the season.

BeNe League Teams for 2013-2014

Team	Country	Home city	Home ground
Standard Fémina de Liège	Belgium	Liège	Complexe Standard de Liège
RSC Anderlecht	Belgium	Anderlecht	RSCA Football Academy
WD Lierse SK	Belgium	Lier	Herman Vanderpoortenstadion
Club Brugge Dames	Belgium	Bruges	Olympiapark
Oud-Heverlee Leuven	Belgium	Heverlee	Gemeentelijk Stadion
AA Gent Ladies	Belgium	Ghent	PGB-Stadion
Royal Antwerp F.C.	Belgium	Antwerp	Bosuilstadion
ADO Den Haag	Netherlands	The Hague	Kyocera Stadion
FC Twente	Netherlands	Enschede	De Grolsch Veste
Telstar	Netherlands	Velsen	TATA Steel Stadion
PEC Zwolle	Netherlands	Zwolle	IJsseldelta Stadion
SC Heerenveen	Netherlands	Heerenveen	Sportpark Skoatterwâld
AFC Ajax	Netherlands	Amsterdam	Sportpark De Toekomst
PSV/FC Eindhoven	Netherlands	Eindhoven	Jan Louwers Stadion
~~FC Utrecht~~	~~Netherlands~~	~~Utrecht~~	~~Sportpark Elinkwijk~~

== Standings ==
All teams play in a single group this season. The best placed Belgium and Dutch team qualify for the Champions League. All games played by Utrecht have been deleted from the table. They stood in 11th place after 16 matches, when they were removed from the table.

=== League table ===
Pos	Team	Pld	W	D	L	GF	GA	GD	Pts	Qualification
1	(Netherlands) Twente	26	21	2	3	104	20	+84	65	Qualification to Champions League (Note: The highest-ranking Belgian team and the highest-ranking Dutch team qualify for the Champions League.)
2	(Belgium) Standard Fémina	26	20	3	3	94	20	+74	63	Qualification to Champions League
3	(Netherlands) Ajax	26	16	6	4	68	23	+45	54	
4	(Netherlands) Heerenveen	26	15	2	9	73	47	+26	47	
5	(Netherlands) Telstar	26	13	4	9	53	33	+20	43	
6	(Netherlands) ADO Den Haag	26	12	3	11	55	39	+16	39	
7	(Netherlands) PSV/FC Eindhoven	26	12	3	11	48	42	+6	39	
8	(Belgium) Anderlecht Féminin	26	11	5	10	43	51	−8	38	
9	(Belgium) WD Lierse	26	9	7	10	39	44	−5	34	
10	(Belgium) OH Leuven	26	8	7	11	34	56	−22	31	
11	(Netherlands) PEC Zwolle	26	9	3	14	50	70	−20	30	
12	(Belgium) Club Brugge	26	1	10	15	19	70	−51	13	
13	(Belgium) Gent	26	2	3	21	22	115	−93	9	
14	(Belgium) Antwerp FC	26	1	6	19	17	89	−72	9	Withdrew from league after season

Updated to match(es) played on 14 November 2014. Source: BeNe League, vrouwenvoetbalnederland.nl - BeNe League 2013-2014 & Soccerway - BeNe League
Rules for classification: 1) points; 2) number of wins; 3) goal difference; 4) number of goals scored

=== Results ===
Home \ Away	ADO	AJX	PSV	HEE	TEL	TWE	ZWO	AND	ANT	CLU	GEN	OHL	LIE	STA
ADO Den Haag		3–3	2–1	3–1	0–1	1–3	1–3	0–1	8–0	1–1	4–2	3–0	3–0	1–0
Ajax	2–1		2–0	3–1	1–1	0–1	7–0	5–1	2–1	7–1	4–0	1–1	1–0	0–1
PSV/FC Eindhoven	1–0	1–0		2–5	4–2	1–1	2–3	2–0	4–2	3–0	3–0	2–1	4–2	1–1
Heerenveen	4–1	2–2	3–2		1–3	1–3	3–2	3–0	9–0	4–0	6–1	4–2	6–5	2–4
Telstar	1–1	0–3	2–3	5–0		0–2	0–4	1–3	2–0	1–0	6–0	2–0	5–0	1–1
Twente	2–0	0–4	4–1	2–1	2–1		6–2	4–1	7–0	9–0	9–1	7–0	1–1	4–2
PEC Zwolle	0–7	2–2	0–3	1–1	1–3	0–4		2–3	4–0	3–1	3–1	0–1	1–2	0–5
Anderlecht Féminin	1–4	1–4	3–2	0–3	3–1	0–3	7–4		4–1	1–1	4–1	1–1	2–2	1–0
Antwerp	0–3	1–3	1–0	0–3	0–2	0–7	0–5	0–1		1–1	4–4	1–1	0–0	1–5
Club Brugge	2–0	0–0	1–1	0–3	0–4	0–7	1–4	1–1	1–1		2–2	1–2	1–4	2–2
AA Gent	0–4	1–5	1–2	0–4	1–4	0–9	1–3	1–3	1–1	1–0		2–0	0–3	0–8
OH Leuven	2–0	1–4	2–1	3–1	0–4	1–7	3–2	1–1	2–1	0–0	7–1		1–1	2–3
WD Lierse	2–3	0–2	2–1	0–2	0–0	1–0	1–1	2–0	3–1	3–2	4–0	0–0		1–2
Standard Fémina	6–1	2–1	2–1	3–0	3–1	1–0	5–0	2–0	7–0	5–0	13–0	6–0	5–0	

Updated to match(es) played on 8 June 2014. Source: vrouwenvoetbalnederland.nl - BeNe League 2013-2014 & Soccerway - BeNe League (in Dutch)
Legend: Blue = home team win; Yellow = draw; Red = away team win.

== Topscorers ==
Miedema won the topscorer award with 39 goals.

Pos.	Player	Club	Goals
1	(Netherlands) Vivianne Miedema	Heerenveen	39
2	(Netherlands) Ellen Jansen	Twente	24
3	(France) Pauline Crammer	Anderlecht	21
4	(Netherlands) Renate Jansen	ADO Den Haag	20
5	(Netherlands) Vanity Lewerissa	Standard	19
6	(Netherlands) Anouk Dekker	Twente	18
6	(Belgium) Aline Zeler	Standard	18
8	(Netherlands) Marianne van Brummelen	PEC Zwolle	16
8	(Belgium) Tessa Wullaert	Standard	16
10	(Netherlands) Jill Roord	Twente	14
