= 2013–14 UEFA Women's Champions League qualifying round =

Tournament details
- Dates: 8–13 August 2013
- Teams: 32

The 2013–14 UEFA Women's Champions League qualifying round was played on 8, 10 and 13 August 2013. A total of 32 teams competed in the qualifying round to decide 10 of the 32 places in the knockout phase of the 2013–14 UEFA Women's Champions League

== Seeding and draw ==
32 teams entered in the qualifying round, and were divided into eight groups of four teams, with one team from each seeding pot. Host countries won't be drawn together.

Pot 1

- (Scotland) Glasgow City
- (Poland) Unia Racibórz
- (Switzerland) Zürich
- (Greece) PAOK
- (Cyprus) Apollon Limassol (host)
- (Romania) Olimpia Cluj (host)
- (Hungary) MTK
- (Bosnia and Herzegovina) SFK 2000 (host)

Pot 2

- (Finland) PK-35 Vantaa (host)
- (Ukraine) Zhytlobud-1 Kharkiv
- (Serbia) Spartak Subotica
- (Netherlands) Twente (host)
- (Bulgaria) NSA Sofia
- (Israel) ASA Tel Aviv University
- (Belarus) Babruichanka Babruisk
- (Faroe Islands) KÍ Klaksvík

Pot 3

- (Croatia) Osijek
- (Lithuania) Gintra Universitetas
- (Slovenia) Pomurje (host)
- (Republic of Ireland) Raheny United
- (Portugal) Atlético Ouriense (host)
- (Wales) Cardiff City
- (Slovakia) Nové Zámky
- (Estonia) Pärnu JK

Pot 4

- (North Macedonia) Biljanini Izvori
- (Turkey) Konak Belediyesi
- (Northern Ireland) Crusaders Strikers (host)
- (Moldova) Goliador Chişinău
- (Albania) Ada
- (Malta) Birkirkara
- (Montenegro) Ekonomist
- (Latvia) Liepājas Metalurgs

Groups were played as mini tournaments over a span of six days.

== Format ==
In each group, teams played against each other in a round-robin mini-tournament at the pre-selected hosts. The eight group winners and the two runners-up with the best record against the first and third-placed teams in their group advanced to the round of 32.

=== Tiebreakers ===
The teams were ranked according to points (3 points for a win, 1 point for a draw, 0 points for a loss). If two or more teams were equal on points on completion of the group matches, the following criteria were applied in the order given to determine the rankings (regulations Article 14.01):

1. Higher number of points obtained in the group matches played among the teams in question;
2. Superior goal difference resulting from the group matches played among the teams in question;
3. Higher number of goals scored in the group matches played among the teams in question;
4. If, after having applied criteria 1 to 4, teams still had an equal ranking, criteria 1 to 3 were reapplied exclusively to the matches between the teams in question to determine their final rankings. If this procedure did not lead to a decision, criteria 5 to 9 applied;
5. Superior goal difference in all group matches;
6. Higher number of goals scored in group matches;
7. If only two teams have the same number of points, and they were tied according to criteria 1 to 6 after having met in the last round of the group, their rankings were determined by a penalty shoot-out (not used if more than two teams had the same number of points, or if their rankings were not relevant for qualification for the next stage).
8. Higher club coefficient;
9. Drawing of lots.

To determine the two best runners-up from the qualifying round, the results against the teams in fourth place were discarded. The following criteria were applied:

1. Higher number of points;
2. Superior goal difference;
3. Higher number of goals scored;
4. Higher club coefficient;
5. Lower disciplinary points total based only on yellow and red cards received (red card = 3 points, yellow card = 1 point, expulsion for two yellow cards in one match = 3 points);
6. Drawing of lots.

== Groups ==
=== Group 1 ===
Pos	Team	Pld	W	D	L	GF	GA	GD	Pts	Qualification	KBB	SFK	NSA	CAR
1	(Turkey) Konak Belediyesi	3	3	0	0	5	1	+4	9	Advance to main round	—	–	–	1–0
2	(Bosnia and Herzegovina) SFK 2000	3	2	0	1	7	4	+3	6		1–2	—	–	3–0
3	(Bulgaria) NSA Sofia	3	1	0	2	4	5	−1	3		0–2	2–3	—	–
4	(Wales) Cardiff City	3	0	0	3	0	6	−6	0		–	–	0–2	—

Source: UEFA
8 August 2013
10:00

SFK 2000 (Bosnia and Herzegovina)	3–0	(Wales) Cardiff City
Fetahović 16', 28'; Jašarević 73'	Report

Otoka, Sarajevo
Attendance: 67
Referee: Jana Adámková (Czech Republic)
8 August 2013
17:00

NSA Sofia (Bulgaria)	0–2	(Turkey) Konak Belediyesi
	Report	Duman 9'; Çınar 75'

Asim Ferhatović Hase Stadium, Sarajevo
Attendance: 77
Referee: Vesna Budimir (Croatia)

10 August 2013
10:30

SFK 2000 (Bosnia and Herzegovina)	1–2	(Turkey) Konak Belediyesi
Fetahović 45+1' (pen.)	Report	Dușa 78', 84'

Otoka, Sarajevo
Attendance: 65
Referee: Vesna Budimir (Croatia)
10 August 2013
17:00

Cardiff City (Wales)	0–2	(Bulgaria) NSA Sofia
	Report	Radoyska 2'; Popadiynova 17'

Otoka, Sarajevo
Attendance: 30
Referee: Riem Hussein (Germany)

13 August 2013
17:00

NSA Sofia (Bulgaria)	2–3	(Bosnia and Herzegovina) SFK 2000
Petrakieva 37' (pen.); Kireva 54'	Report	Fetahović 45+2'; Spahić 72'; Kuliš 82'

Otoka, Sarajevo
Attendance: 135
Referee: Jana Adámková (Czech Republic)
13 August 2013
17:00

Konak Belediyesi (Turkey)	1–0	(Wales) Cardiff City
Duman 36'	Report

SRC Slavija, Sarajevo
Attendance: 40
Referee: Riem Hussein (Germany)

=== Group 2 ===
Pos	Team	Pld	W	D	L	GF	GA	GD	Pts	Qualification	SUB	OCL	GIN	LIE
1	(Serbia) Spartak Subotica	3	3	0	0	24	3	+21	9	Advance to main round	—	8–3	–	10–0
2	(Romania) Olimpia Cluj	3	2	0	1	13	8	+5	6		–	—	3–0	7–0
3	(Lithuania) Gintra Universitetas	3	1	0	2	2	9	−7	3		0–6	–	—	–
4	(Latvia) Liepājas Metalurgs	3	0	0	3	0	19	−19	0		–	–	0–2	—

Source: UEFA
8 August 2013
15:00

Spartak Subotica (Serbia)	10–0	(Latvia) Liepājas Metalurgs
M. Nikolić 6', 10', 13'; Nahi 8', 29'; Nrehy 45'; Čubrilo 62', 72'; Adamov 79', 81'	Report

Cluj Arena, Cluj-Napoca
Attendance: 200
Referee: Aneliya Sinabova (Bulgaria)
8 August 2013
18:30

Olimpia Cluj (Romania)	3–0	(Lithuania) Gintra Universitetas
Lunca 26', 36'; Vătafu 48' (pen.)	Report

Cluj Arena, Cluj-Napoca
Attendance: 500
Referee: Gyöngyi Gaál (Hungary)

10 August 2013
15:00

Gintra Universitetas (Lithuania)	0–6	(Serbia) Spartak Subotica
	Report	Slovic 17' (pen.); M. Nikolić 20', 50', 67'; Čubrilo 52', 85'

Cluj Arena, Cluj-Napoca
Attendance: 100
Referee: Rhona Daly (Ireland)
10 August 2013
18:30

Olimpia Cluj (Romania)	7–0	(Latvia) Liepājas Metalurgs
Vătafu 20'; Voicu 24', 81'; Ficzay 27'; Bâtea 51'; Lunca 53', 89'	Report

Cluj Arena, Cluj-Napoca
Attendance: 400
Referee: Aneliya Sinabova (Bulgaria)

13 August 2013
11:00

Liepājas Metalurgs (Latvia)	0–2	(Lithuania) Gintra Universitetas
	Report	Vanagaitė 11'; Ragauskaitė 72'

Cluj Arena, Cluj-Napoca
Attendance: 50
Referee: Rhona Daly (Ireland)
13 August 2013
18:00

Spartak Subotica (Serbia)	8–3	(Romania) Olimpia Cluj
Čubrilo 1', 24', 64'; Nahi 16'; M. Nikolić 28', 33', 67', 90+3'	Report	Vătafu 43' (pen.); Lunca 59', 81'

Cluj Arena, Cluj-Napoca
Attendance: 500
Referee: Gyöngyi Gaál (Hungary)

=== Group 3 ===
Pos	Team	Pld	W	D	L	GF	GA	GD	Pts	Qualification	MTK	Z1K	RAH	CNS
1	(Hungary) MTK	3	3	0	0	6	2	+4	9	Advance to main round	—	–	3–2	2–0
2	(Ukraine) Zhytlobud-1 Kharkiv	3	2	0	1	7	2	+5	6		0–1	—	–	5–0
3	(Republic of Ireland) Raheny United	3	1	0	2	5	6	−1	3		–	1–2	—	–
4	(Northern Ireland) Crusaders Strikers	3	0	0	3	1	9	−8	0		–	–	1–2	—

Source: UEFA
8 August 2013
14:00

MTK (Hungary)	3–2	(Republic of Ireland) Raheny United
Vágó 12', 39'; Papp 69'	Report	McCabe 15'; Creagh 52'

Seaview, Belfast
Attendance: 117
Referee: Christina W. Pedersen (Norway)
8 August 2013
19:30

Zhytlobud-1 Kharkiv (Ukraine)	5–0	(Northern Ireland) Crusaders Strikers
Ovdiychuk 25', 82'; Mozolska 31'; Platt 48' (o.g.); Tykhonova 55' (pen.)	Report

Seaview, Belfast
Attendance: 327
Referee: Lilach Asulin (Israel)

10 August 2013
14:00

Raheny United (Republic of Ireland)	1–2	(Ukraine) Zhytlobud-1 Kharkiv
Murray 16'	Report	Ovdiychuk 39'; Tykhonova 44' (pen.)

Seaview, Belfast
Attendance: 84
Referee: Stéphanie Frappart (France)
10 August 2013
19:30

MTK (Hungary)	2–0	(Northern Ireland) Crusaders Strikers
Vágó 58'; Zágor 74'	Report

Seaview, Belfast
Attendance: 429
Referee: Lilach Asulin (Israel)

13 August 2013
16:00

Zhytlobud-1 Kharkiv (Ukraine)	0–1	(Hungary) MTK
	Report	Pádár 77'

Solitude, Belfast
Attendance: 50
Referee: Christina W. Pedersen (Norway)
13 August 2013
16:00

Crusaders Strikers (Northern Ireland)	1–2	(Republic of Ireland) Raheny United
McDowell 11'	Report	Murray 29'; Waldron 58'

Seaview, Belfast
Attendance: 391
Referee: Stéphanie Frappart (France)

=== Group 4 ===
Pos	Team	Pld	W	D	L	GF	GA	GD	Pts	Qualification	ZÜR	OUR	EKO	KKL
1	(Switzerland) Zürich	3	3	0	0	12	1	+11	9	Advance to main round	—	5–0	4–1	–
2	(Portugal) Atlético Ouriense	3	1	1	1	3	7	−4	4		–	—	–	2–1
3	(Montenegro) Ekonomist	3	0	2	1	3	6	−3	2		–	1–1	—	–
4	(Faroe Islands) KÍ Klaksvík	3	0	1	2	2	6	−4	1		0–3	–	1–1	—

Source: UEFA
8 August 2013
16:00

Zürich (Switzerland)	5–0	(Portugal) Atlético Ouriense
Humm 9', 51'; Zehnder 22', 53'; Beutler 90+3'	Report

Estádio Municipal, Fátima
Attendance: 1547
Referee: Esther Azzopardi (Malta)
8 August 2013
16:00

KÍ Klaksvík (Faroe Islands)	1–1	(Montenegro) Ekonomist
Purkhús 16'	Report	Kuć 38'

Estádio Municipal Dr. Alves Vieira, Torres Novas
Attendance: 30
Referee: Sara Persson (Sweden)

10 August 2013
16:00

Zürich (Switzerland)	4–1	(Montenegro) Ekonomist
Kiwic 59'; Humm 71', 77'; Remund 84'	Report	Mrkić 64' (pen.)

Estádio Municipal Dr. Alves Vieira, Torres Novas
Attendance: 50
Referee: Sara Persson (Sweden)
10 August 2013
16:00

Atlético Ouriense (Portugal)	2–1	(Faroe Islands) KÍ Klaksvík
Silva 53'; Pinto 55'	Report	Andreasen 62'

Estádio Municipal, Fátima
Attendance: 1200
Referee: Anastasia Pustovoitova (Russia)

13 August 2013
16:00

KÍ Klaksvík (Faroe Islands)	0–3	(Switzerland) Zürich
	Report	Humm 40'; Selimi 55'; Sow 64'

Estádio Municipal Dr. Alves Vieira, Torres Novas
Attendance: 50
Referee: Esther Azzopardi (Malta)
13 August 2013
16:00

Ekonomist (Montenegro)	1–1	(Portugal) Atlético Ouriense
Bulatović 65'	Report	Silva 28'

Estádio Municipal, Fátima
Attendance: 800
Referee: Anastasia Pustovoitova (Russia)

=== Group 5 ===
Pos	Team	Pld	W	D	L	GF	GA	GD	Pts	Qualification	UNR	POM	BOB	ADA
1	(Poland) Unia Racibórz	3	2	1	0	10	1	+9	7	Advance to main round	—	3–1	–	7–0
2	(Slovenia) Pomurje	3	2	0	1	17	4	+13	6		–	—	3–1	–
3	(Belarus) Bobruichanka Bobruisk	3	1	1	1	4	4	0	4		0–0	–	—	3–1
4	(Albania) Ada	3	0	0	3	1	23	−22	0		–	0–13	–	—

Source: UEFA
8 August 2013
17:30

Bobruichanka Bobruisk (Belarus)	3–1	(Albania) Ada
Buzinova 32'; Ayila 40', 56'	Report	Doci 76'

Sports Park, Beltinci
Attendance: 70
Referee: Zuzana Kováčová (Slovakia)
8 August 2013
20:30

Unia Racibórz (Poland)	3–1	(Slovenia) Pomurje
Chinasa 21', 72'; Chudzik 41' (pen.)	Report	Nikl 64'

Sports Park, Lendava
Attendance: 500
Referee: Pernilla Larsson (Sweden)

10 August 2013
17:30

Pomurje (Slovenia)	3–1	(Belarus) Bobruichanka Bobruisk
Vrabel 41'; Erman 77'; Nikl 89'	Report	Kuchinskaya 7'

Sports Park, Beltinci
Attendance: 400
Referee: Sandra Bastos (Portugal)
10 August 2013
20:30

Unia Racibórz (Poland)	7–0	(Albania) Ada
Grzywińska 4'; Jaszek 6'; Govori 9' (o.g.); Wiśniewska 15'; Żelazko 34'; Chinasa 67', 86'	Report

Sports Park, Lendava
Attendance: 40
Referee: Zuzana Kováčová (Slovakia)

13 August 2013
17:00

Bobruichanka Bobruisk (Belarus)	0–0	(Poland) Unia Racibórz
	Report

Sports Park, Lendava
Attendance: 32
Referee: Pernilla Larsson (Sweden)
13 August 2013
17:00

Ada (Albania)	0–13	(Slovenia) Pomurje
	Report	Prša 14'; Vrabel 20', 34', 41', 45+3', 50', 53', 90+2'; Tibaut 45+1', 61'; Erman 57'; Conjar 66'; Rola 74'

Sports Park, Beltinci
Attendance: 300
Referee: Sandra Bastos (Portugal)

=== Group 6 ===
Pos	Team	Pld	W	D	L	GF	GA	GD	Pts	Qualification	PK35	PJK	PAOK	BIL
1	(Finland) PK-35 Vantaa	3	2	1	0	15	2	+13	7	Advance to main round	—	–	2–1	13–1
2	(Estonia) Pärnu JK	3	2	1	0	6	2	+4	7	Advance to main round	0–0	—	–	–
3	(Greece) PAOK	3	1	0	2	7	5	+2	3		–	1–3	—	5–0
4	(North Macedonia) Biljanini Izvori	3	0	0	3	2	21	−19	0		–	1–3	–	—

Source: UEFA
8 August 2013
13:30

PAOK (Greece)	1–3	(Estonia) Pärnu JK
Markou 70'	Report	Himanen 32'; Žernosekova 58'; Ivanova 81'

ISS Stadion, Vantaa
Attendance: 50
Referee: Saša Ihringová (England)
8 August 2013
18:00

PK-35 Vantaa (Finland)	13–1	(North Macedonia) Biljanini Izvori
Saarinen 10', 13', 68'; Ruutu 14', 67'; Ojanperä 27', 45', 55', 65', 84'; I. Salmi 37'; Franssi 76'; Velaj 86'	Report	Porali 1' (o.g.)

ISS Stadion, Vantaa
Attendance: 335
Referee: Paloma Quintero Siles (Spain)

10 August 2013
13:30

PAOK (Greece)	5–0	(North Macedonia) Biljanini Izvori
Tselekoglou 8'; Arvanitaki 13'; Gkatzogianni 18'; Dimitrijević 35', 69'	Report

ISS Stadion, Vantaa
Attendance: 54
Referee: Paloma Quintero Siles (Spain)
10 August 2013
18:00

Pärnu JK (Estonia)	0–0	(Finland) PK-35 Vantaa
	Report

ISS Stadion, Vantaa
Attendance: 215
Referee: Yuliya Medvedeva-Keldyusheva (Kazakhstan)

13 August 2013
18:00

PK-35 Vantaa (Finland)	2–1	(Greece) PAOK
Kivelä 14', 56'	Report	Dimitrijević 60'

ISS Stadion, Vantaa
Attendance: 325
Referee: Saša Ihringová (England)
13 August 2013
18:00

Biljanini Izvori (North Macedonia)	1–3	(Estonia) Pärnu JK
Serenaj 67'	Report	Ivanova 8'; Malets 19'; Žernosekova 43'

Sonera Stadium, Helsinki
Attendance: 30
Referee: Yuliya Medvedeva-Keldyusheva (Kazakhstan)

=== Group 7 ===
Pos	Team	Pld	W	D	L	GF	GA	GD	Pts	Qualification	APL	UNZ	ASA	GOL
1	(Cyprus) Apollon Limassol	3	3	0	0	6	0	+6	9	Advance to main round	—	2–0	–	1–0
2	(Slovakia) Nové Zámky	3	1	1	1	6	2	+4	4		–	—	0–0	–
3	(Israel) ASA Tel Aviv University	3	1	1	1	6	3	+3	4		0–3	–	—	6–0
4	(Moldova) Goliador Chişinău	3	0	0	3	0	13	−13	0		–	0–6	–	—

Source: UEFA
8 August 2013
18:00

Apollon Limassol (Cyprus)	2–0	(Slovakia) Nové Zámky
Čupajová 28' (o.g.); G. DiMartino 48'	Report

Pafiako Stadium, Paphos
Attendance: 80
Referee: Carina Vitulano (Italy)
8 August 2013
21:00

ASA Tel Aviv University (Israel)	6–0	(Moldova) Goliador Chişinău
Friedman 5'; Israel 19', 62'; Shenar 45', 49'; Avital 83'	Report

Pafiako Stadium, Paphos
Attendance: 20
Referee: Knarik Grigoryan (Armenia)

10 August 2013
18:00

Nové Zámky (Slovakia)	0–0	(Israel) ASA Tel Aviv University
	Report

Pafiako Stadium, Paphos
Attendance: 20
Referee: Séverine Zinck (France)
10 August 2013
21:00

Apollon Limassol (Cyprus)	1–0	(Moldova) Goliador Chişinău
Laiu 62'	Report

Pafiako Stadium, Paphos
Attendance: 80
Referee: Knarik Grigoryan (Armenia)

13 August 2013
18:00

ASA Tel Aviv University (Israel)	0–3	(Cyprus) Apollon Limassol
	Report	Kostova 58' (pen.); Solomou 64'; Georgiou 76'

Pafiako Stadium, Paphos
Attendance: 100
Referee: Carina Vitulano (Italy)
13 August 2013
18:00

Goliador Chişinău (Moldova)	0–6	(Slovakia) Nové Zámky
	Report	Horváthová 16', 45+1'; Mgcoyi 29'; Krisztin 36', 90+3'; Andrušková 84' (pen.)

Kouklia Community Stadium, Paphos
Attendance: 30
Referee: Séverine Zinck (France)

=== Group 8 ===
Pos	Team	Pld	W	D	L	GF	GA	GD	Pts	Qualification	GLA	TWE	OSI	BIR
1	(Scotland) Glasgow City	3	3	0	0	18	0	+18	9	Advance to main round	—	–	7–0	9–0
2	(Netherlands) Twente	3	2	0	1	10	2	+8	6	Advance to main round	0–2	—	–	6–0
3	(Croatia) Osijek	3	1	0	2	7	12	−5	3		–	0–4	—	–
4	(Malta) Birkirkara	3	0	0	3	1	22	−21	0		–	–	1–7	—

Source: UEFA
8 August 2013
19:00

Glasgow City (Scotland)	7–0	(Croatia) Osijek
Love 20', 32', 35'; Crilly 24'; Lappin 27'; Robertson 55'; Ross 60' (pen.)	Report

Sportpark Slangenbeek, Hengelo
Attendance: 50
Referee: Linn Andersson (Sweden)
8 August 2013
19:00

Twente (Netherlands)	6–0	(Malta) Birkirkara
van de Sanden 2'; Dekker 61'; Heuver 66'; Roord 68', 82'; Berends 90+3'	Report

De Grolsch Veste, Enschede
Attendance: 400
Referee: Ivana Vlaić (Bosnia and Herzegovina)

10 August 2013
16:00

Glasgow City (Scotland)	9–0	(Malta) Birkirkara
Lappin 19'; Littlejohn 23' (pen.); Barnes 36'; Malone 42'; Crilly 60', 69', 90+4'; Dalziel 84'; Ross 87'	Report

Sportpark Slangenbeek, Hengelo
Attendance: 40
Referee: Ivana Vlaić (Bosnia and Herzegovina)
10 August 2013
19:00

Osijek (Croatia)	0–4	(Netherlands) Twente
	Report	Roord 35', 50'; Heuver 42'; Berends 54'

Sportpark Slangenbeek, Hengelo
Attendance: 750
Referee: Simona Ghisletta (Switzerland)

13 August 2013
17:00

Twente (Netherlands)	0–2	(Scotland) Glasgow City
	Report	Corsie 39'; Crilly 90+1'

De Grolsch Veste, Enschede
Attendance: 2750
Referee: Linn Andersson (Sweden)
13 August 2013
17:00

Birkirkara (Malta)	1–7	(Croatia) Osijek
Zahra 69'	Report	Joščak 21', 75'; Baban 52' (pen.), 76'; Lojna 54', 80', 90'

Sportpark Slangenbeek, Hengelo
Attendance: 25
Referee: Simona Ghisletta (Switzerland)

=== Ranking of group runners-up ===
The two best runners-up also qualify for the round of 32. The match against the fourth-placed team in the group does not count for the purposes of the runners-up table. The tie-breakers in this ranking are:

1. Higher number of points obtained
2. Superior goal difference
3. Higher number of goals scored
4. Higher number of club coefficient points
5. Fair play conduct in all group matches

Pos	Grp	Team	Pld	W	D	L	GF	GA	GD	Pts	Qualification
1	6	(Estonia) Pärnu JK	2	1	1	0	3	1	+2	4	Advance to main round
2	8	(Netherlands) Twente	2	1	0	1	4	2	+2	3	Advance to main round
3	1	(Bosnia and Herzegovina) SFK 2000	2	1	0	1	4	4	0	3	
4	5	(Slovenia) Pomurje	2	1	0	1	4	4	0	3	
5	3	(Ukraine) Zhytlobud-1 Kharkiv	2	1	0	1	2	2	0	3	
6	2	(Romania) Olimpia Cluj	2	1	0	1	6	8	−2	3	
7	7	(Slovakia) Nové Zámky	2	0	1	1	0	2	−2	1	
8	4	(Portugal) Atlético Ouriense	2	0	1	1	1	6	−5	1	
