= 2014 Arsenal L.F.C. season =

English women's football club season

Arsenal Ladies
2014 season
- Chairman: Sir Chips Keswick
- Manager: Shelley Kerr (Until 1 June 2014); John Bayer (From 26 June 2014 until 10 August 2014, interim); Kelly Smith (From 10 August 2014 until 29 August 2014, interim); Pedro Martínez Losa (From 29 August 2014)
- Stadium: Meadow Park
- WSL 1: Fourth
- FA Cup: Winners
- WSL Cup: Runners Up
- Champions League: Quarter-finals
- Top goalscorer: League: Jordan Nobbs (5); Casey Stoney (5); All: Danielle Carter (15)
- Biggest win: 11–1 (vs CSHVSM Kairat, UWCL, 17 October 2013)
- Biggest defeat: 0–2 (vs Birmingham City (H), UWCL, 30 March 2013); 0–2 (vs Reading (A), 2014 FA WSL Cup, 15 May 2014); 0–2 (vs Birmingham City (H), WSL 1, 21 May 2014); 0–2 (vs Bristol Academy (H), WSL 1, 25 May 2014)
Home colours	Away colours

2014 Arsenal L.F.C. season
Home colours	Away colours	Third colours

The 2014 season was Arsenal Ladies Football Club's 27th season since forming in 1987. The club participated in the fourth edition of the FA WSL, England's top flight for women's football since 2011. Arsenal also played in the FA Women's Cup, and the FA WSL Cup, winning the former against Everton in June. They also competed in the UEFA Women's Champions League, losing at the Quarter Final stage to Birmingham City, triggering a 5-year exile from the competition. After a poor start to the season, including three straight home defeats, Shelley Kerr stood down as Arsenal manager following the FA Cup Final win over Everton. She was replaced on an interim basis by their Centre of Excellence Technical Director, John Bayer, and then later by Kelly Smith, who operated in a player-manager capacity. On the 29th August, Arsenal appointed Pedro Martinez Losa to be their full-time manager.

As this season bridged the gap between the Men's Team's 2013–14 and 2014–15 seasons, the team wore two different sets of kits during each half of the season.

== Review ==
=== UWCL campaign ===
Five days after their WSL Cup Final win over Lincoln, Arsenal had already begun their new season with the start of the 2013–14 UEFA Women's Champions League, hoping to better their run to the semi finals the previous season. In the Round of 32 stage, they were drawn against Kazakhstan side CSHVSM, who they obliterated 18-2 on aggregate. In the next round, they were paired with Glasgow City. After a routine 3-0 win at The Hive, Arsenal sealed their passage into the quarter finals with a 3-2 win away at Petershill Park, with Alex Scott's late winner making it four wins from four.

=== Pre-season ===
The 2013 season had seen Arsenal fail to defend their WSL crown, ending their 9-year dominance over the English game, and also failed to qualify for the 2014–15 UEFA Women's Champions League. Despite clinching FA Cup and WSL Cup double, the fallout from those failures would role into pre-season, as the squad collapsed following a mass exodus of talent.

Young attacking midfield maestro Kim Little followed previous manager Laura Harvey to the NWSL to play for Seattle Reign. Steph Houghton made the move to recently promoted Manchester City, whilst Gemma Davison travelled north to play for the new WSL champions, Liverpool. Ellen White, Arsenal's main striker, went to the newly formed Notts County, following Lincoln's controversial relocation. Katie Chapman and Gilly Flaherty were both signed by Chelsea, as they looked to improve their position in the WSL under Emma Hayes. The vastly experience Irish duo of Yvonne Tracy and Ciara Grant also chose to call time on their Arsenal careers. Tracy retired from the game altogether, whilst Grant moved to Reading, before also retiring a year later.

Arsenal looked to replace the departing experience with Casey Stoney, who had previously been at the club at the turn of the millennium as a youth player. Also arriving was Scottish international Christie Murray, Dutch defender Anouk Hoogendijk, Japanese pair Yukari Kinga and Shinobu Ohno, and England international keeper Siobhan Chamberlain.

Despite the departures, Arsenal were able to retain some of their major players. Young stars such as Jordan Nobbs, Danielle Carter, Jade Bailey and Freda Ayisi all committed their futures to the club. Alex Scott, Kelly Smith and Rachel Yankey, key components of past Arsenal sides, also signed on to stay at the club, as did veteran goalkeeper Emma Byrne.

As part of their pre-season, Arsenal did a tour of the Midlands, playing Derby County and Nottingham Forest in friendlies. Arsenal defeated Derby County 5-0, but could only draw 0-0 with Nottingham Forest.

=== March - April ===
March saw Arsenal continue their Champions League campaign with a quarter final tie against Birmingham City. Both sides knew they had to win the competition outright if they wanted to stay in Europe next season, after both sides finished out of the qualification slots the previous season. Arsenal had finished above their midland counterparts in the past three seasons, and defeated them in two WSL Cup Finals. But this time, it was Birmingham City who had the edge, and clinched the first leg 1-0 when Remi Allen swept in Chelsea Weston's cross. Despite having the second leg at home at The Hive, the Gunners crumbled in the face of the youthful Blues. Kirsty Linnett pushed Birmingham further ahead on aggregate when she toed a bouncing ball past Kinga, burst into the box and drove the ball past Byrne. Allen scored then scored her second of the tie just after the half hour mark, converting Karen Carney's low cross. Arsenal had no response, and Birmingham easily saw out the tie to progress to the semi finals. It was a defeat that had huge ramifications for Arsenal, not only would they now miss out on Europe the following season, it also exposed the damage the winter exodus had done to the team, leaving them with an aged squad that could no longer compete. Arsenal fell away from Europe, and would not return for another five years.

Arsenal respond to their European exit by commencing their FA Cup run, starting with a fifth round tie against Gillingham. A second half brace from Kelly Smith, the latter a penalty, was enough to progress them to the next round. Three days later, Arsenal travelled to Meadow Lane for their first WSL match of the season, against Notts County. This was a new era for Notts County, having previously played at Sincil Bank, when they played as Lincoln. Jess Clarke scored Notts County's first WSL goal when she outpaced Stoney and smashed the ball past Byrne. But ten minutes into the second half, Alex Scott's thumping volley levelled the game, reacting quickest when Ohno's effort was blocked. Both Smith and Carter hit the woodwork in an attempt to complete the turnaround, but 1-1 it remained.

=== May ===
May began with a WSL Cup match against London rivals Watford. After a goalless first half, Danielle Carter went close to giving the home side the lead right at the start of the second half, only to see her effort come back off the post. Kinga and Ohno then combined as the later put Arsenal 1-0 up. Freda Ayisi made it 2-0 when she converted Leah Williamson's low cross, before Alex Scott scored for the second game in a row with a thumping header to wrap up the win.

Arsenal's attentions then turned to the FA Cup, and a chance for revenge against their conquerors in Europe, Birmingham City. It looked as though a repeat of that European exit was on the cards again when Remi Allen headed Birmingham ahead on the half-hour. But Kelly Smith quickly equalised from the penalty spot, and then in the second half, Ayisi slotted the ball past the Birmingham keeper to complete the comeback.

Seven days later, and it was the FA Cup again, this time, in the semi-finals against Chelsea, in what proved to be a classic contest. The drama began when Kelly Smith saw her first half penalty saved by Marie Hourihan. Then, midway through the second half, Ji So-yun smashed Chelsea in front. Arsenal's response was rapid, as Smith headed in Carter's flighted ball. With five minutes left to play, Yūki Õgimi thought she had won it for Chelsea, only for Smith to equalise again just seconds later with a long range effort. In extra time, Arsenal took the lead for the first time in the match, as goals from Carter and Ohno moved them 4-2 ahead, only for Eni Aluko to pull one back with half time imminent. It would be Casey Stoney who would ultimately put the match to bed once and for all, heading in a corner in the second half of extra-time, concluding an incredible 5-3 win.

After the highs of such a dramatic cup tie, Arsenal then landed back in reality with a bump when they played Reading in the WSL Cup. A brilliant solo goal from Fran Kirby gave the WSL 2 side the lead, and they doubled it when Lauren Bruton converted a rebound from Emma Byrne. It would prove to be the beginning of a disatrous losing streak, as Arsenal welcomed newly promoted Manchester City to Meadow Park. A solitary goal from Toni Duggan proved to be enough to record the Citizen's first win in the division. The rot continued, as just three days later, Arsenal hosted Birmingham City, where a second half brace from Kirsty Linnett re-established their newfound dominance over the North London side. Then it was Bristol Academy's turn to repeat the trick, with Sophie Ingle and Natalia Pablos dealing Arsenal a second home 2-0 defeat, and their fourth consecutive defeat in all competitions. The Bristol Academy defeat proved to be the final straw, as Shelley Kerr immediately announced her resignation as Arsenal manager, confirming she would step down following their FA Cup Final against Everton.

== Squad information & statistics ==
=== First team squad ===
Squad statistics correct as of May 2018

Squad No.	Name	Date of Birth (Age)	Since	Last Contract	Signed From
Goalkeepers
1	(Republic of Ireland) Emma Byrne	14 June 1979 (aged 35)	2000	December 2013	(Denmark) Fortuna Hjørring
21/15	(England) Siobhan Chamberlain	15 August 1983 (aged 31)	2013	December 2013	(England) Bristol Academy
28	(England) Cherie Rowlands ‡	11 October 1988 (aged 26)	2013		(England) Barnet
Defenders
2	(England) Steph Houghton ‡	23 April 1988 (aged 26)	2010	August 2010	(England) Leeds Carnegie
22/2	(England) Alex Scott	14 October 1984 (aged 30)	2012	January 2014	(United States) Boston Breakers
3	(Republic of Ireland) Yvonne Tracey ‡	27 February 1981 (aged 33)	2000		(Republic of Ireland) St Patrick's Athletic
18/3	(Scotland) Emma Mitchell	19 September 1992 (aged 22)	2013	July 2013	(Germany) SGS Essen
4	(Japan) Yukari Kinga	2 May 1984 (aged 30)	2014	February 2014	(Japan) INAC Kobe Leonessa
5	(England) Gilly Flaherty ‡	24 August 1991 (aged 23)	2006		(England) Arsenal Academy
23/5	(England) Casey Stoney	13 May 1982 (aged 32)	2014	January 2014	(England) Lincoln
6	(Netherlands) Anouk Hoogendijk	6 May 1985 (aged 29)	2014	January 2014	(Netherlands) Ajax
19	(Republic of Ireland) Niamh Fahey	13 October 1987 (aged 27)	2008		(Republic of Ireland) Salthill Devon
25	(England) Jade Bailey	11 November 1995 (aged 18)	2013	December 2013	(England) Arsenal Academy
34	(Jamaica) Vyan Sampson	2 July 1996 (aged 18)	2014		(England) Arsenal Academy
28	(England) Taome Oliver	11 May 1996 (aged 18)	2014		(England) Arsenal Academy
Midfielders
8	(England) Jordan Nobbs	8 December 1992 (aged 21)	2010	November 2013	(England) Sunderland
14	(England) Leah Williamson	29 March 1997 (aged 17)	2014		(England) Arsenal Academy
16	(Scotland) Kim Little ‡	26 September 1990 (aged 24)	2008		(Scotland) Hibernian
16	(Scotland) Christie Murray	3 May 1990 (aged 24)	2014	January 2014	(Scotland) Glasgow City
17	(England) Katie Chapman ‡	15 June 1982 (aged 32)	2010		(United States) Chicago Red Stars
17	(Germany) Turid Knaak	24 January 1991 (aged 23)	2014	July 2014	(Germany) Bayer Leverkusen
20	(Scotland) Caroline Weir	20 June 1995 (aged 19)	2013	July 2013	(Scotland) Hibernian
24	(Ghana) Freda Ayisi	12 October 1994 (aged 20)	2013	December 2013	(England) Arsenal Academy
30	(England) Bianca Bragg	14 January 1994 (aged 20)	2014		(England) Arsenal Academy
36	(England) Frances Steele	2 October 1996 (aged 18)	2013		(England) Arsenal Academy
Forwards
27/7	(Japan) Shinobu Ohno	23 January 1984 (aged 30)	2014	February 2014	(France) Lyon
9	(England) Ellen White ‡	9 May 1989 (aged 25)	2010		(England) Leeds Carnegie
15/9	(England) Danielle Carter	18 May 1993 (aged 21)	2009	November 2013	(England) Arsenal Academy
23/10	(England) Kelly Smith (c)	29 October 1978 (aged 36)	2012	January 2014	(United States) Boston Breakers
11	(England) Rachel Yankey	1 November 1979 (aged 34)	2005	January 2014	(United States) New Jersey Wildcats
12	(England) Gemma Davison ‡	17 April 1987 (aged 27)	2012		(United States) Sky Blue FC

‡ = Player played in the earlier rounds of the UEFA Women's Champions League, but departed Arsenal before the start of the WSL Season

=== Appearances and goals ===
No.	Name	WSL 1		FA Cup		WSL Cup		UWCL		Total	
No.	Name	Apps	Goals	Apps	Goals	Apps	Goals	Apps	Goals	Apps	Goals
Goalkeepers
1	(Republic of Ireland) Emma Byrne	13	0	1	0	5	0	6	0	25	0
15	(England) Siobhan Chamberlain	1	0	3	0	2	0	0	0	6	0
28	(England) Cherie Rowlands ‡	0	0	0	0	0	0	0	0	0	0
Defenders
2	(England) Steph Houghton ‡	0	0	0	0	0	0	3	1	3	1
22/2	(England) Alex Scott	14	3	4	0	7	3	6	1	31	7
3	(Republic of Ireland) Yvonne Tracey ‡	0	0	0	0	0	0	1	0	1	0
18/3	(Scotland) Emma Mitchell	13	0	4	0	3	0	6	0	26	0
4	(Japan) Yukari Kinga	9+3	0	4	1	5+1	0	2	0	20+4	1
5	(England) Gilly Flaherty ‡	0	0	0	0	0	0	4	0	4	0
5	(England) Casey Stoney	14	5	4	1	7	1	2	0	27	7
6	(Netherlands) Anouk Hoogendijk	0+1	0	0+1	0	2	0	0	0	2+2	0
19	(Republic of Ireland) Niamh Fahey	10+1	0	1	0	5	1	0	0	16+1	1
25	(England) Jade Bailey	10+1	0	3+1	0	5	0	2+1	0	20+3	0
34	(Jamaica) Vyan Sampson	1	0	0	0	0	0	0	0	1	0
28	(England) Taome Oliver	0	0	0	0	0+1	0	0	0	0+1	0
Midfielders
8	(England) Jordan Nobbs	9	5	0	0	4+1	0	4	4	17+1	9
14	(England) Leah Williamson	11+2	1	3+1	0	7	1	0+1	0	21+4	2
16	(Scotland) Kim Little ‡	0	0	0	0	0	0	4	5	4	5
16	(Scotland) Christie Murray	2+1	0	1+2	0	2+1	0	0	0	5+4	0
17	(England) Katie Chapman ‡	0	0	0	0	0	0	4	1	4	1
17	(Germany) Turid Knaak	2+2	0	0	0	2+1	2	0	0	4+3	2
20	(Scotland) Caroline Weir	0+6	0	0+1	0	2+1	1	2+3	1	4+11	2
24	(Ghana) Freda Ayisi	4+7	1	2	1	2+4	2	0+4	1	8+15	5
30	(England) Bianca Bragg	0	0	0+1	0	0	0	0+1	0	0+2	0
36	(England) Frances Steele	0	0	0	0	0	0	0	0	0	0
Forwards
7	(Japan) Shinobu Ohno	10	0	4	1	4+2	2	2	0	20+2	3
9	(England) Ellen White ‡	0	0	0	0	0	0	4	1	4	1
9	(England) Danielle Carter	13	4	4	1	6+1	3	6	7	29+1	15
23/10	(England) Kelly Smith (c)	6+4	4	4	6	3+2	3	2+2	0	15+8	13
11	(England) Rachel Yankey	12+2	1	2+2	0	4+2	0	5	2	25+6	3
12	(England) Gemma Davison ‡	0	0	0	0	0	0	1+3	0	1+3	0

‡ = Player played in the earlier rounds of the UEFA Women's Champions League, but departed Arsenal before the start of the WSL Season

=== Goalscorers ===
Rank	No.	Position	Name	WSL 1	FA Cup	WSL Cup	UWCL	Total
1	9	FW	(England) Danielle Carter	4	1	3	7	15
2	23/10	FW	(England) Kelly Smith	4	6	3	0	13
3	8	MF	(England) Jordan Nobbs	5	0	0	4	9
4	5	DF	(England) Casey Stoney	5	1	1	0	7
4	22/2	DF	(England) Alex Scott	3	0	3	1	7
6	24	MF	(Ghana) Freda Ayisi	1	1	2	1	5
6	16	MF	(Scotland) Kim Little ‡	0	0	0	5	5
8	11	FW	(England) Rachel Yankey	1	0	0	2	3
8	7	FW	(Japan) Shinobu Ohno	0	1	2	0	3
10	14	MF	(England) Leah Williamson	1	0	1	0	2
10	20	MF	(Scotland) Caroline Weir	0	0	1	1	2
10	17	MF	(Germany) Turid Knaak	0	0	2	0	2
13	9	FW	(England) Ellen White ‡	0	0	0	1	1
13	17	MF	(England) Katie Chapman ‡	0	0	0	1	1
13	19	DF	(Republic of Ireland) Niamh Fahey	0	0	1	0	1
13	4	DF	(Japan) Yukari Kinga	0	1	0	0	1
13	2	DF	(England) Steph Houghton ‡	0	0	0	1	1
Total				24	11	19	24	78

=== Disciplinary record ===
Rank	No.	Position	Name	WSL 1		FA Cup		WSL Cup		UWCL		Total	
Rank	No.	Position	Name	Booked	Sent off (straight red)	Booked	Sent off (straight red)	Booked	Sent off (straight red)	Booked	Sent off (straight red)	Booked	Sent off (straight red)
1	19	DF	(Republic of Ireland) Niamh Fahey	2	0	0	0	0	0	0	0	2	0
1	23/10	FW	(England) Kelly Smith	1	0	0	0	0	0	1	0	2	0
1	18/3	DF	(Scotland) Emma Mitchell	1	0	0	0	1	0	0	0	2	0
1	9	FW	(England) Danielle Carter	1	0	0	0	0	0	1	0	2	0
1	24	MF	(Ghana) Freda Ayisi	1	0	0	0	0	0	1	0	2	0
6	22/2	DF	(England) Alex Scott	1	0	0	0	0	0	0	0	1	0
6	5	DF	(England) Casey Stoney	1	0	0	0	0	0	0	0	1	0
6	11	FW	(England) Rachel Yankey	0	0	0	0	0	0	1	0	1	0
6	17	MF	(England) Katie Chapman ‡	0	0	0	0	0	0	1	0	1	0
Total				8	0	0	0	1	0	5	0	14	0

=== Clean sheets ===
Rank	No.	Name	WSL 1	FA Cup	WSL Cup	UWCL	Total
1	1	(Republic of Ireland) Emma Byrne	2	1	3	1	7
2	15	(England) Siobhan Chamberlain	0	1	2	0	3
Total			2	2	5	1	10

== Transfers, loans and other signings ==
=== Transfers in ===
Announcement date	No.	Position	Player	From club
19 December 2013	15	GK	(England) Siobhan Chamberlain	(England) Bristol Academy
2 January 2014	5	DF	(England) Casey Stoney	(England) Lincoln
13 January 2014	6	DF	(Netherlands) Anouk Hoogendijk	(Netherlands) Ajax
30 January 2014	16	MF	(Scotland) Christie Murray	(Scotland) Glasgow City
15 February 2014	4	DF	(Japan) Yukari Kinga	(Japan) INAC Kobe Leonessa
15 February 2014	7	FW	(Japan) Shinobu Ohno	(France) Lyon

=== Loans in ===
Announcement date	No.	Position	Player	From club
4 July 2014	17	MF	(Germany) Turid Knaak	(Germany) Bayer Leverkusen

=== Contract extensions ===
Announcement date	No.	Position	Player	At Arsenal since
8 November 2013	8	MF	(England) Jordan Nobbs	2010
8 November 2013	9	MF	(England) Danielle Carter	Homegrown
19 December 2013	1	GK	(Republic of Ireland) Emma Byrne	2000
23 December 2013	25	FW	(England) Jade Bailey	Homegrown
23 December 2013	24	MF	(Ghana) Freda Ayisi	Homegrown
3 January 2014	2	DF	(England) Alex Scott	2012
22 January 2014	11	FW	(England) Rachel Yankey	2005
28 January 2014	10	FW	(England) Kelly Smith	2012

=== Transfers out ===
Announcement date	No.	Position	Player	To club
20 November 2013	16	MF	(Scotland) Kim Little	(United States) Seattle Reign
5 December 2013	2	DF	(England) Steph Houghton	(England) Manchester City
17 December 2013	12	FW	(England) Gemma Davison	(England) Liverpool
20 December 2013	9	FW	(England) Ellen White	(England) Notts County
9 January 2014	17	MF	(England) Katie Chapman	(England) Chelsea
9 January 2014	5	DF	(England) Gilly Flaherty	(England) Chelsea
3 February 2014	3	DF	(Republic of Ireland) Yvonne Tracy	Retired
3 February 2014	7	MF	(Republic of Ireland) Ciara Grant	(England) Reading
26 March 2014	31	GK	(England) Sophie Harris	(England) London Bees
4 April 2014	32	DF	(England) Molly Bartrip	(England) Reading
2 July 2014	6	DF	(Netherlands) Anouk Hoogendijk	(Netherlands) Ajax
4 July 2014	30	MF	(England) Bianca Bragg	(England) Reading

== Club ==
=== Kit (2013-14) ===
Supplier: Nike / Sponsor: Fly Emirates

Home	Away	Goalkeeper 1	Goalkeeper 2	Goalkeeper 3	Goalkeeper 4

==== Kit information ====
Nike supplied their last kit for Arsenal this season, which saw an end to 20 years of contract. Puma became the club's new supplier kit for next season.

- Home: The home kit from last season was unchanged. As usual, Arsenal switched to red socks in an event of a socks clashes in some away games.
- Away: The away kit used the traditional Arsenal colours of yellow and blue. The design appealed to a lot of fans. The kit was yellow with a blue polo neck collar and deep blue cuffs on the sleeves, both featuring thin yellow stripes. The away shorts were blue while the away socks featured the traditional Arsenal hoops socks design in blue and yellow, harking back to the style of those worn in the 1930s under the management of Herbert Chapman.
- Keeper: There were four goalkeeper kits, and all of them were all based on Nike's two-tone goalkeeper template. The home kit was grey and black with lime green accents. The away kit was in two shades of purple, while the third kit was in two tones of light green and was the most commonly worn strip. The fourth and the last kit was in two tones of silver.

Kit	Combination	Usage	
Home	Red body; White sleeves; White shorts; White socks.	WSL	Notts County (A); Manchester City (H); Birmingham City (H); Bristol Academy (H); Chelsea (H); Everton (A); Notts County (H)
Home	Red body; White sleeves; White shorts; White socks.	WSL Cup	Watford (H); Reading (A); Chelsea (H); London Bees (H); Millwall (A)
Home	Red body; White sleeves; White shorts; White socks.	FA Cup	Gillingham (H); Birmingham City (A); Chelsea (A); Everton (N)
Home	Red body; White sleeves; White shorts; White socks.	UWCL	CSHVSM-Kairat (A); CSHVSM-Kairat (H); Glasgow City (H); Birmingham City (A); Birmingham City (H)
Away	Yellow body; Yellow Sleeves; Blue shorts; Hooped socks.	WSL	Liverpool (A)
Away	Yellow body; Yellow Sleeves; Blue shorts; Hooped socks.	UWCL	Glasgow City (A)

=== Kit (2014-15) ===
Supplier: Puma / Sponsor: Fly Emirates

Home	Away

==== Kit usage (2014-15) ====
Kit	Combination		Usage
Home	Red body; White sleeves; White shorts; Red hooped socks.	WSL	Manchester City (A); Birmingham City (A); Chelsea (H); Liverpool (H); Everton (H)
Home	Red body; White sleeves; White shorts; Red hooped socks.	WSL Cup	Notts County (H); Manchester City (N)
Away	Yellow body; Navy sleeves; Navy shorts; Navy hooped socks.	WSL	Bristol Academy (A)

== Pre-season ==
18 February 2014	Derby County	0–5	Arsenal	Spondon
19:45 GMT (UTC+0)		Report	Carter 5', 76', 80'; Smith 27' (pen.); Ayisi 87'	Stadium: Anderson Electrical Arena

20 February 2014	Nottingham Forest	0–0	Arsenal	Rolls Royce Leisure Club
19:30 GMT (UTC+0)		Report

== Competitions ==
=== Overall record ===
Competition	First match	Last match	Starting round	Final position	Record							
Competition	First match	Last match	Starting round	Final position	Pld	W	D	L	GF	GA	GD	Win %
FA WSL 1	16 April 2014	12 October 2014	Matchday 1	4th	14	6	3	5	23	16	+7	42.86
FA Women's Cup	13 April 2014	1 June 2014	Fifth round	Winners	4	4	0	0	11	4	+7	100.00
FA WSL Cup	1 May 2014	16 October 2014	Group stage	Runners-up	7	5	0	2	19	3	+16	71.43
UEFA Women's Champions League	9 October 2013	30 March 2014	Round of 32	Quarter-finals	6	4	0	2	24	7	+17	66.67
Total					31	19	3	9	77	30	+47	61.29

Source: FA WSL

=== FA WSL 1 ===
==== Partial league table ====
Pos	Team	Pld	W	D	L	GF	GA	GD	Pts	Qualification or relegation
2	Chelsea	14	8	2	4	23	16	+7	26	Qualification for the Champions League knockout phase
3	Birmingham City	14	7	4	3	20	14	+6	25	
4	Arsenal	14	6	3	5	24	21	+3	21	
5	Manchester City	14	6	1	7	13	16	−3	19	
6	Notts County	14	4	6	4	12	8	+4	18	

Source: FA WSL
Rules for classification: 1) Points; 2) Goal difference; 3) Number of goals scored

==== Results summary ====
Overall								Home						Away					
Pld	W	D	L	GF	GA	GD	Pts	W	D	L	GF	GA	GD	W	D	L	GF	GA	GD
14	6	3	5	23	20	+3	21	1	2	4	9	13	−4	5	1	1	14	7	+7

==== Results by matchday ====
Matchday	1	2	3	4	5	6	7	8	9	10	11	12	13	14
Ground	A	H	H	H	A	A	A	H	A	A	H	A	H	H
Result	D	L	L	L	W	L	W	D	W	W	L	W	D	W
Position	1	8	8	8	7	7	6	6	6	4	4	4	4	4

Updated to match(es) played on 20 May 2018. Source: FA WSL
W = Win; D = Draw; L = Loss

==== Matches ====
16 April 2014 1	Notts County	1–1	Arsenal	Nottingham
19:30 BST	Clarke 26'	Report	A. Scott 55' (yellow card) 87'	Stadium: Meadow Lane; Attendance: 1,583; Referee: Darren Russell

18 May 2014 2	Arsenal	0–1	Manchester City	Borehamwood
14:00 BST		Report	Duggan 11'	Stadium: Meadow Park; Attendance: 829; Referee: Andrew Fox

21 May 2014 3	Arsenal	0–2	Birmingham City	Borehamwood
19:45 BST	Smith (yellow card) 76'	Report	Mannion (yellow card) 16'; Linnett 49', 60'	Stadium: Meadow Park; Referee: Josh Smith

25 May 2014 4	Arsenal	0–2	Bristol Academy	Borehamwood
14:00 BST		Report	Ingle 30'; Natalia 59'	Stadium: Meadow Park; Attendance: 614; Referee: Richard Hart

29 June 2014 5	Liverpool	0–1	Arsenal	Widnes
12:15 BST		Report	Stoney 55'	Stadium: Halton Stadium; Attendance: 852; Referee: Anthony Tankard

16 July 2014 6	Chelsea	2–1	Arsenal	Staines
19:00 BST	Blundell (yellow card) 36'; Ōgimi 50' (yellow card) 54'; Ji 62'; Flaherty (yellow card) 74' (yellow-red card) 90'; Spence (yellow card) 89'	Report	Fahey (yellow card) 61'; Smith 65' (pen.)	Stadium: Wheatsheaf Park; Attendance: 626; Referee: Jonathan Creswick

20 July 2014 7	Everton	1–2	Arsenal	Widnes
14:00 BST	Parris 45' (yellow card) 45'; Hinnigan (penalty missed) 64'	Report	Mitchell (yellow card) 20'; Fahey (yellow card) 23'; Carter 43'; A. Scott 86'; Stoney (yellow card) 90'	Stadium: Halton Stadium; Attendance: 559; Referee: Aaron Jackson

27 July 2014 8	Arsenal	1–1	Notts County	Borehamwood
14:00 BST	Stoney 9' (pen.); Mitchell (yellow card)	Report	Friend (yellow card) 78'; O'Sullivan 88'	Stadium: Meadow Park; Attendance: 771; Referee: Joshua Smith

24 August 2014 9	Manchester City	0–4	Arsenal	Manchester
14:00 BST	Houghton (yellow card) 33'	Report	Nobbs 6'; Carter 58' (yellow card) 80'; Yankey 69'; Stoney 82'	Stadium: Manchester Regional Arena; Attendance: 891; Referee: Duncan Carratt

31 August 2014 10	Birmingham City	1–2	Arsenal	Solihull
14:00 BST	Allen (yellow card) 60'; Carney 90+5' (pen.)	Report	Stoney 22'; Ayisi (yellow card) 60' (goal) 70'	Stadium: Damson Park; Attendance: 481; Referee: Amy Fearn

4 September 2014 11	Arsenal	2–3	Chelsea	Borehamwood
19:45 BST	Carter 10'; Stoney (penalty missed) 20'; Williamson 31'	Report	Ōgimi 25' (pen.); Groenen 28'; Borges (yellow card) 36'; Spence (yellow card) 78'; Ji 89'	Stadium: Meadow Park; Attendance: 808; Referee: Sarah Garratt

20 September 2014 12	Bristol Academy	3–4	Arsenal	Stoke Gifford
18:00 BST	Matthews 2'; Watts 35' (pen.); Natalia 76'	Report	Smith 50', 53', 66' (pen.); A. Scott 55'	Stadium: Stoke Gifford Stadium; Referee: Andrew Bennet

5 October 2014 13	Arsenal	3–3	Liverpool	Borehamwood
14:00 BST	Nobbs 2', 12'; Stoney 54'	Report	Williams 37'; Rolser 66'; Davison 90+3'	Stadium: Meadow Park; Attendance: 808; Referee: Rob Ellis

12 October 2014 14	Arsenal	3–1	Everton	Borehamwood
14:00 BST	Nobbs 45+2', 90+3'; Carter 49'	Report	Parris 11'	Stadium: Meadow Park; Attendance: 610; Referee: Jonathan Burridge

=== FA Women's Cup ===
13 April 2014 Fifth round	Arsenal	2–0	Gillingham	Borehamwood
14:00 BST	Smith 63', 81' (pen.)	Report		Stadium: Meadow Park; Attendance: 458; Referee: Jairo Marin

4 May 2014 Quarter-finals	Birmingham City	1–2	Arsenal	Solihull
12:00 BST	Allen 30'; Weston (yellow card) 66'	Report	Smith 39' (pen.); Ayisi 54'	Stadium: Damson Park; Attendance: 487; Referee: Geoffrey Laws

11 May 2014 Semi-finals	Chelsea	3–5 (a.e.t.)	Arsenal	Woking
14:00 BST	Ji 69'; Ōgimi 85'; Aluko 104'; Chapman (yellow card) 55'	Report	Smith (penalty missed) 35' 70', 86'; Carter 93'; Ohno 99'; Stoney 109'	Stadium: Kingfield Stadium; Attendance: 877; Referee: Sian Piret

1 June 2014 Final	Arsenal	2–0	Everton	Milton Keynes
16:30 BST	Smith 15'; Kinga 61'	Report		Stadium: Stadium MK; Attendance: 15,098; Referee: Martin Atkinson

=== FA WSL Cup ===
==== Group stage ====
Pos	Team	Pld	W	D	L	GF	GA	GD	Pts	Qualification	CHE	ARS	WAT	MIL	REA	LON
1	Chelsea	5	4	0	1	22	5	+17	12	Advance to knock-out stage	—	—	—	2–0	—	13–0
2	Arsenal	5	4	0	1	17	2	+15	12	Advance to knock-out stage	3–0	—	3–0	—	—	7–0
3	Watford	5	2	0	3	5	11	−6	6		1–2	—	—	1–5	—	—
4	Millwall Lionesses	5	1	2	2	3	8	−5	5		—	0–4	—	—	1–1	—
5	Reading (Note: Reading had three points deducted due to fielding a cup-tied player in the win against London Bees.)	5	2	1	2	12	4	+8	4		1–2	2–0	AWD (Note: Awarded win for Watford. Fixture was not played as Reading were removed from the Cup after fielding a cup-tied player the match earlier.)	—	—	—
6	London Bees	5	0	1	4	2	31	−29	1		—	—	1–3	0–0	1–8	—

Source: FA WSL
Rules for classification: 1) Points; 2) Goal difference; 3) Number of goals scored
Notes:

1 May 2014 1	Arsenal	3–0	Watford	Borehamwood
19:45 BST	Ohno 65'; Ayisi 76'; A. Scott 86'	Report		Stadium: Meadow Park; Attendance: 509; Referee: Paul Johnson

15 May 2014 2	Reading	2–0	Arsenal	Farnborough
19:45 BST	Kirby 8'; Bruton 38'	Report	Mitchell (yellow card) 45'	Stadium: Cherrywood Road; Attendance: 387; Referee: Daniel Berry

6 July 2014 3	Arsenal	3–0	Chelsea	Borehamwood
14:00 BST	Smith 44' (pen.), 82'; Ohno 74'	Report	Williams (yellow card) 44'	Stadium: Meadow Park; Attendance: 615; Referee: Daniel Cook

10 July 2014 4	Arsenal	7–0	London Bees	Borehamwood
14:00 BST	Ayisi 1'; Knaak 2', 84'; Stoney 23'; Carter 57'; A. Scott 88', 89'	Report		Stadium: Meadow Park; Referee: Tim Donnellan

13 July 2014 5	Millwall Lionesses	0–4	Arsenal	Beckenham
14:00 BST		Report	Fahey 24'; Carter 30', 90+1'; Williamson 43'	Stadium: Eden Park Avenue; Attendance: 225; Referee: Stuart Franklin

==== Knockout stage ====
7 September 2014 Semi-finals	Arsenal	2–0 (a.e.t.)	Notts County	Borehamwood
14:00 BST	Weir 98'; Mitchell (yellow card) 104'; Smith 117' (pen.)	Report	Turner (yellow card) 60'	Stadium: Meadow Park; Attendance: 692; Referee: Ian Fissenden

16 October 2014 Final	Arsenal	0–1	Manchester City	High Wycombe
19:45 BST	Fahey (yellow card) 65'; Williamson (yellow card) 77'	Report	Christiansen 72'	Stadium: Adams Park; Attendance: 3,697; Referee: Nigel Lugg

=== UEFA Women's Champions League ===
==== Knockout phase ====
===== Round of 32 =====
9 October 2013 First leg	CSHVSM Kairat (Kazakhstan)	1–7	(England) Arsenal	Almaty
14:00 BST	Aniskovtseva 58'	Report	Little 31', 71'; Carter 43'; Nobbs 44'; Chapman 48'; Yankey 51'; Ayisi 85'; Yankey (yellow card) 87'	Stadium: Tsentralniy; Attendance: 1,500; Referee: Sharon Sluyts (Belgium)

17 October 2013 Second leg	Arsenal (England)	11–1 (18–2 agg.)	(Kazakhstan) CSHVSM Kairat	Borehamwood
15:00 BST	Carter 14', 54', 58', 63'; White 25'; Little 32' (pen.), 51' (pen.), 67'; Nobbs 34', 82'; Weir 72'; Ayisi (yellow card) 85'	Report	Sarikova (yellow card) 32'; Mamedova (yellow card) 51'; Zouga (yellow card) 74'; Ivanova (yellow card) 80'; Sarikova 90+1'	Stadium: Meadow Park; Attendance: 313; Referee: Sofia Karagiorgi (Cyprus)

===== Round of 16 =====
9 November 2013 First leg	Arsenal (England)	3–0	(Scotland) Glasgow City	London
14:00 GMT (UTC+0)	Houghton 14'; Carter 43'; McSorley 63' (o.g.); Chapman (yellow card) 47'	Report	McSorley (yellow card) 60'	Stadium: The Hive; Attendance: 869; Referee: Teodora Albon (Romania)

13 November 2013 Second leg	Glasgow City (Scotland)	2–3 (6–2 agg.)	(England) Arsenal	Glasgow
20:00 GMT (UTC+0)	Lappin 2'; Corsie 79'	Report	Yankey 12'; Nobbs 69'; Scott 90+3'	Stadium: Petershill Park; Attendance: 1,300; Referee: Pernilla Larsson (Sweden)

===== Quarter-finals =====
24 March 2014 First leg	Birmingham City (England)	1–0	(England) Arsenal	Birmingham
20:00 GMT (UTC+0)	Allen 26'; Linnett (yellow card) 56'	Report	Smith (yellow card) 19'; Carter (yellow card) 55'; Kinga (yellow card) 60'	Stadium: St Andrew's; Attendance: 2,671; Referee: Esther Staubli (Switzerland)

30 March 2014 Second leg	Arsenal (England)	0–2 (0–3 agg.)	(England) Birmingham City	London
15:00 GMT (UTC+0)		Report	Linnett 25'; Allen 32'	Stadium: The Hive; Attendance: 1,054; Referee: Bibiana Steinhaus (Germany)

== See also ==
- List of Arsenal W.F.C. seasons
- 2013–14 in English football
- 2014–15 in English football
