= 2013 Damallsvenskan =

Damallsvenskan
- Season: 2013
- Champions: LdB FC Malmö
- Relegated: Mallbackens IF, Sunnanå SK
- UEFA Women's Champions League: LdB FC Malmö, Tyresö FF
- Matches: 126
- Goals: 640 (5.08 per match)
- Top goalscorer: Christen Press (23 goals)
- Biggest home win: TFF 10–2 SSK (19 May)
- Biggest away win: SSK 0–8 TFF (3 Sep)
- Highest scoring: TFF 10–2 SSK (19 May)
- Longest winning run: 10 games LdB Malmö
- Longest losing run: 11 games Sunnanå SK
- Highest attendance: 5,361; LFC 2–2 KIFÖ (5 May)
- Lowest attendance: 179; JBK 5–2 SSK (4 May)
- Total attendance: 97,860
- Average attendance: 741
- All statistics are retrieved from svenskfotboll.se (in Swedish)

The 2013 Damallsvenskan, part of the 2013 Swedish football season, is the 26th season of Damallsvenskan since its establishment in 1988. The season began on 13 April 2013 and ends on 20 October 2013. Tyresö FF are the defending champions, having won their first title the previous season.

A total of 12 teams played in the league; 10 returned from the 2012 season and 2 were promoted from Division 1.

== Teams ==
Djurgårdens IF and AIK were relegated at the end of the 2012 season after finishing in the bottom two places of the table. They were replaced by Division 1 division champions Sunnanå SK and Mallbackens IF.

Locations of the 2013 Damallsvenskan teams

Team	Location	Stadium	Stadium capacity (Note: According to each club information page at the Swedish Football Association website for Allsvenskan.)
Jitex BK	Mölndal	Åbyvallen	1,500
KIF Örebro DFF	Örebro	Behrn Arena	13,500
Kopparbergs/Göteborg FC	Gothenburg	Valhalla IP	3,000
Kristianstads DFF	Kristianstad	Vilans IP	5,000
LdB FC Malmö	Malmö	Malmö IP	6,800
Linköpings FC	Linköping	Arena Linköping	8,500
Mallbackens IF	Lysvik	Strandvallen	4,000
Piteå IF	Piteå	LF Arena	3,950
Sunnanå SK	Skellefteå	Norrvalla IP	3,000
Tyresö FF	Tyresö	Tyresövallen	3,500
Umeå IK	Umeå	T3 Arena	9,000
Vittsjö GIK	Vittsjö	Vittsjö IP	3,000

== League table ==
Tyresö FF, second placed team in 2013 Damallsvenskan, would have qualified for the Champions League, but renounced its place in June 2014 after economic problems. As a result, the berth was given to Linköpings FC, the third placed team of the league.

Pos	Team	Pld	W	D	L	GF	GA	GD	Pts	Qualification or relegation
1	LdB FC Malmö (C, Q)	22	17	4	1	55	14	+41	55	Qualification to Champions League Round of 32
2	Tyresö FF	22	14	6	2	71	24	+47	48	
3	Linköpings FC (Q)	22	14	4	4	46	25	+21	46	Qualification to Champions League Round of 32
4	Kopparbergs/Göteborg FC	22	9	6	7	33	31	+2	33	
5	Umeå IK	22	9	4	9	31	29	+2	31	
6	KIF Örebro DFF	22	7	8	7	37	35	+2	29	
7	Piteå IF	22	7	6	9	31	32	−1	27	
8	Vittsjö GIK	22	7	6	9	32	34	−2	27	
9	Kristianstads DFF	22	7	3	12	38	43	−5	24	
10	Jitex BK	22	5	7	10	20	37	−17	22	
11	Mallbackens IF (R)	22	3	7	12	17	40	−23	16	Relegation to Elitettan
12	Sunnanå SK (R)	22	0	5	17	15	82	−67	5	Relegation to Elitettan

Source: svenskfotboll.se (in Swedish)
Rules for classification: 1) Points; 2) Goal difference; 3) Number of goals scored
(C) Champions; (Q) Qualified for the phase indicated; (R) Relegated

== Results ==
Home \ Away	JBK	KIFÖ	KGFC	KDFF	LdB	LFC	MIF	PIF	SSK	TFF	UIK	VGIK
Jitex BK		2–4	0–0	1–0	0–2	1–1	1–1	1–1	5–2	0–7	2–1	0–0
KIF Örebro DFF	0–1		0–2	3–1	0–0	1–5	4–0	1–1	6–1	1–1	4–0	3–1
Kopparbergs/Göteborg FC	0–0	4–1		4–3	0–5	1–1	5–1	1–0	3–0	2–2	1–1	0–1
Kristianstads DFF	1–0	2–2	2–0		0–1	1–2	3–0	1–1	5–1	2–3	1–2	1–1
LdB FC Malmö	1–0	4–2	3–1	5–0		4–0	3–0	1–0	4–0	2–2	2–0	4–0
Linköpings FC	4–0	2–2	3–0	3–1	3–1		1–0	3–1	1–1	4–1	1–0	3–0
Mallbackens IF	1–0	1–1	0–1	1–2	1–1	3–1		3–0	1–1	1–1	0–2	1–3
Piteå IF	3–2	0–1	0–2	3–2	2–2	1–2	1–0		2–0	1–1	2–3	3–0
Sunnanå SK	0–0	0–0	1–2	1–4	0–3	1–4	1–1	2–5		0–8	0–1	1–5
Tyresö FF	5–0	3–0	4–1	5–1	2–3	2–0	5–0	2–1	10–2		1–0	2–1
Umeå IK	1–3	1–1	3–0	3–1	1–2	2–0	2–0	0–1	4–0	2–2		2–2
Vittsjö GIK	2–1	3–0	0–0	1–4	0–2	1–2	1–1	2–2	5–0	0–2	3–0	

Updated to match(es) played on 20 October 2013. Source: svenskfotboll.se (in Swedish)
Legend: Blue = home team win; Yellow = draw; Red = away team win.

== Season statistics ==
Updated as of matches played on 20 October 2013.

=== Top scorers ===
Rank	Player	Club	Goals
1	(United States) Christen Press	Tyresö FF	23
2	(Denmark) Pernille Harder	Linköpings FC	18
3	(Germany) Anja Mittag	LdB FC Malmö	13
3	(Iceland) Margrét Lára Viðarsdóttir	Kristianstads DFF	13
5	(Nigeria) Sarah Michael	KIF Örebro DFF	12
5	(Brazil) Marta	Tyresö FF	12
7	(Finland) Sanna Talonen	KIF Örebro DFF	11
7	(Netherlands) Manon Melis	LdB FC Malmö	11
7	(Scotland) Jane Ross	Vittsjö GIK	11
10	(Switzerland) Ramona Bachmann	LdB FC Malmö	10
10	(Sweden) Lina Hurtig	Umeå IK	10
10	(England) Jodie Taylor	Kopparbergs/Göteborg FC	10
