= 2013–14 UEFA Women's Champions League knockout phase =

Tournament details
- Dates: 09 October 2013 – 22 May 2014
- Teams: 32

The 2013–14 UEFA Women's Champions League knockout phase began on 9 October 2013 and concluded on 22 May 2014 with the final at Estádio do Restelo in Lisbon, Portugal to decide the champions of the 2013–14 UEFA Women's Champions League. A total of 32 teams competed in the knockout phase.

== Round and draw dates ==
UEFA has scheduled the competition as follows.

Round	Draw	First leg	Second leg
Round of 32	5 September 2013	9–10 October 2013	16–17 October 2013
Round of 16	5 September 2013	9–10 November 2013	13–14 November 2013
Quarterfinals	21 November 2013	22–23 March 2014	29–30 March 2014
Semifinals	21 November 2013	19–20 April 2014	26–27 April 2014
Final	21 November 2013	22 May 2014	

== Format ==
The knockout phase involved 32 teams: 22 teams which qualified directly, and 10 teams which qualified from the qualifying round (eight group winners and two best runners-up).

Each tie in the knockout phase, apart from the final, was played over two legs, with each team playing one leg at home. The team that scored more goals on aggregate over the two legs advanced to the next round. If the aggregate score was level, the away goals rule was applied, i.e. the team that scored more goals away from home over the two legs advanced. If away goals were also equal, then 30 minutes of extra time were played. The away goals rule was again applied after extra time, i.e. if there were goals scored during extra time and the aggregate score was still level, the visiting team advanced by virtue of more away goals scored. If no goals were scored during extra time, the tie was decided by a penalty shoot-out. In the final, which was played as a single match, if scores were level at the end of normal time, extra time was played, followed by a penalty shoot-out if scores remained tied.

The mechanism of the draws for each round was as follows:

- In the draw for the round of 32, 16 teams were seeded and 16 teams were unseeded, based on their UEFA club coefficients at the beginning of the season. The seeded teams were drawn against the unseeded teams, with the seeded teams hosting the second leg. Teams from the same group or the same association could not be drawn against each other.
- In the draws for the round of 16 onwards, there were no seedings, and teams from the same group or the same association could be drawn against each other.

== Qualified teams ==
22 teams enter the competition in the round of 32. They are joined by ten teams from the qualifying round. Teams marked (Q) advanced from qualifying.

Seeded:

- (France) Lyon
- (Germany) Turbine Potsdam
- (England) Arsenal
- (Russia) Rossiyanka
- (Italy) Torres
- (Germany) Wolfsburg
- (Denmark) Brøndby
- (Sweden) LdB Malmö
- (Czech Republic) Sparta Praha
- (Denmark) Fortuna Hjørring
- (France) Paris S-G
- (Austria) Neulengbach
- (Russia) Zorkiy Krasnogorsk
- (Scotland) Glasgow City (Q)
- (England) Birmingham City
- (Poland) Unia Racibórz (Q)

Unseeded:

- (Sweden) Tyresö
- (Switzerland) Zürich (Q)
- (Belgium) Standard Liège
- (Cyprus) Apollon Limassol (Q)
- (Italy) Tavagnacco
- (Kazakhstan) CSHVSM Kairat
- (Hungary) MTK (Q)
- (Spain) Barcelona
- (Norway) Lillestrøm SK
- (Finland) PK-35 Vantaa (Q)
- (Iceland) Thór/KA
- (Austria) Spratzern
- (Netherlands) Twente (Q)
- (Serbia) Spartak Subotica (Q)
- (Estonia) Pärnu JK (Q)
- (Turkey) Konak Belediyesi (Q)

== Bracket ==
Round of 32
(Iceland) Thór/KA	1	1	2
(Russia) Z. Krasnogorsk	2	4	6
(Finland) PK-35 Vantaa	0	0	0
(England) Birmingham City	3	1	4
(Kazakhstan) CSHVSM Kairat	1	1	2
(England) Arsenal	7	11	18
(Belgium) Standard Liège	2	1	3
(Scotland) Glasgow City	2	3	5
(Italy) Tavagnacco	3	0	3
(Denmark) Fortuna Hjørring	2	2	4
(Sweden) Tyresö	2	0	2
(France) Paris Saint-Germain	1	0	1
(Turkey) Konak Belediyesi	2	0	2
(Poland) Unia Racibórz	1	0	1
(Cyprus) Apollon Limassol	1	1	2
(Austria) Neulengbach	2	1	3
(Serbia) Spartak Subotica	2	1	3
(Russia) Rossiyanka	4	1	5
(Austria) Spratzern	2	1	3
(Italy) Torres	2	3	5
(Hungary) MTK	0	0	0
(Germany) Turbine Potsdam	5	6	11
(Netherlands) Twente	0	0	0
(France) Lyon	4	6	10
(Norway) Lillestrøm SK	1	0	1
(Sweden) Malmö	3	5	8
(Estonia) Pärnu JK	0	0	0
(Germany) Wolfsburg	14	13	27
(Spain) Barcelona (a)	0	2	2
(Denmark) Brøndby	0	2	2
(Switzerland) Zürich	2	1	3
(Czech Republic) Sparta Prague	1	1	2

Round of 16
(Russia) Zorkiy Krasnogorsk	0	2	2
(England) Birmingham City	2	5	7
(England) Arsenal	3	3	6
(Scotland) Glasgow City	0	2	2
(Denmark) Fortuna Hjørring	1	0	1
(Sweden) Tyresö	2	4	6
(Turkey) Konak Belediyesi	0	0	0
(Austria) Neulengbach	3	3	6
(Russia) Rossiyanka	1	0	1
(Italy) Torres	0	2	2
(Germany) Turbine Potsdam (a)	0	2	2
(France) Lyon	1	1	2
(Sweden) Malmö	1	1	2
(Germany) Wolfsburg	2	3	5
(Spain) Barcelona	3	3	6
(Switzerland) Zürich	0	1	1

Quarterfinals
(England) Birmingham City	1	2	3
(England) Arsenal	0	0	0
(Sweden) Tyresö	8	0	8
(Austria) Neulengbach	1	0	1
(Italy) Torres	0	1	1
(Germany) Turbine Potsdam	8	4	12
(Germany) Wolfsburg	3	2	5
(Spain) Barcelona	0	0	0

Semifinals
(England) Birmingham City	0	0	0
(Sweden) Tyresö	0	3	3
(Germany) Turbine Potsdam	0	2	2
(Germany) Wolfsburg	0	4	4

Final
(Sweden) Tyresö	3
(Germany) Wolfsburg	4

== Round of 32 ==
The round of 32 and round of 16 was drawn on 5 September 2013. Teams from the same association or qualifying group couldn't be drawn together. Seeded teams played the second leg at home. Teams are awarded 20,000 Euro for both legs. A sum criticized to be too small by team managers, leaving teams like Arsenal who have to fly by plane with financial losses.

Team 1	Agg.	Team 2	1st leg	2nd leg
Thór/KA (Iceland)	2–6	(Russia) Zorkiy Krasnogorsk	1–2	1–4
PK-35 Vantaa (Finland)	0–4	(England) Birmingham City	0–3	0–1
CSHVSM Kairat (Kazakhstan)	2–18	(England) Arsenal	1–7	1–11
Standard Liège (Belgium)	3–5	(Scotland) Glasgow City	2–2	1–3
Tavagnacco (Italy)	3–4	(Denmark) Fortuna Hjørring	3–2	0–2
Tyresö (Sweden)	2–1	(France) Paris Saint-Germain	2–1	0–0
Konak Belediyesi (Turkey)	2–1	(Poland) Unia Racibórz	2–1	0–0
Apollon Limassol (Cyprus)	2–3	(Austria) Neulengbach	1–2	1–1
Spartak Subotica (Serbia)	3–5	(Russia) Rossiyanka	2–4	1–1
Spratzern (Austria)	3–5	(Italy) Torres	2–2	1–3
MTK (Hungary)	0–11	(Germany) Turbine Potsdam	0–5	0–6
Twente (Netherlands)	0–10	(France) Lyon	0–4	0–6
Lillestrøm SK (Norway)	1–8	(Sweden) Malmö	1–3	0–5
Pärnu JK (Estonia)	0–27	(Germany) Wolfsburg	0–14	0–13
Barcelona (Spain)	2–2 (a)	(Denmark) Brøndby	0–0	2–2
Zürich (Switzerland)	3–2	(Czech Republic) Sparta Prague	2–1	1–1

9 October 2013
17:30

Thór/KA (Iceland)	1–2	(Russia) Zorkiy Krasnogorsk
Olgeirsdóttir 88'	Report	Tsydikova 22'; Morozova 36'

Tórsvøllur, Akureyri
Attendance: 307
Referee: Stéphanie Frappart (France)
16 October 2013
15:00

Zorkiy Krasnogorsk (Russia)	4–1	(Iceland) Thór/KA
Morozova 22'; Djatel 24'; Nick 34'; Mautz 65'	Report	Ásgrímsdóttir 58'

Rodina Stadium, Khimki
Attendance: 350
Referee: Linn Andersson (Sweden)

Zorkiy Krasnogorsk won 6–2 on aggregate.

9 October 2013
17:30

PK-35 Vantaa (Finland)	0–3	(England) Birmingham City
	Report	Lawley 23'; Linnett 50'; Harrop 70'

ISS Stadion, Vantaa
Attendance: 920
Referee: Jenny Palmqvist (Sweden)
16 October 2013
15:00

Birmingham City (England)	1–0	(Finland) PK-35 Vantaa
Weston 50'	Report

DCS Stadium, Stratford-upon-Avon
Attendance: 316
Referee: Gyöngyi Gaál (Hungary)

Birmingham City won 4–0 on aggregate.

9 October 2013
12:00

CSHVSM Kairat (Kazakhstan)	1–7	(England) Arsenal
Aniskovtseva 58'	Report	Little 31', 71'; Carter 43'; Nobbs 44'; Chapman 48'; Yankey 51'; Ayisi 85'

Tsentralniy, Almaty
Attendance: 1,500
Referee: Sharon Sluyts (Belgium)
17 October 2013
15:00

Arsenal (England)	11–1	(Kazakhstan) CSHVSM Kairat
Carter 14', 54', 58', 63'; White 25'; Little 32' (pen.), 51' (pen.), 67'; Nobbs 34', 82'; Weir 72'	Report	Sarikova 90+1'

Meadow Park, Borehamwood
Attendance: 313
Referee: Sofia Karagiorgi (Cyprus)

Arsenal won 18–2 on aggregate.

9 October 2013
19:00

Standard Liège (Belgium)	2–2	(Scotland) Glasgow City
Lewerissa 27'; Wullaert 50'	Report	Lappin 44', 66'

Stade Maurice Dufrasne, Liège
Attendance: 2,293
Referee: Olga Zadinová (Czech Republic)
17 October 2013
20:00

Glasgow City (Scotland)	3–1	(Belgium) Standard Liège
Zeler 15' (o.g.); O'Sullivan 30'; Crilly 56'	Report	Wullaert 90+2'

Petershill Park, Glasgow
Attendance: 929
Referee: Monika Mularczyk (Poland)

Glasgow City won 5–3 on aggregate.

9 October 2013
20:30

Tavagnacco (Italy)	3–2	(Denmark) Fortuna Hjørring
Camporese 33'; Tuttino 45+1'; Zuliani 74'	Report	Spânu 11'; Arnth 28'

Comunale Di Tavagnacco, Tavagnacco
Attendance: 660
Referee: Riem Hussein (Germany)
16 October 2013
18:30

Fortuna Hjørring (Denmark)	2–0	(Italy) Tavagnacco
Larsen 35'; Rus 81'	Report

Hjørring Stadion, Hjørring
Attendance: 1,521
Referee: Anastasia Pustovoitova (Russia)

Fortuna Hjørring won 4–3 on aggregate.

9 October 2013
19:15

Tyresö (Sweden)	2–1	(France) Paris Saint-Germain
Press 21', 66'	Report	Delannoy 36' (pen.)

Tyresövallen, Tyresö
Attendance: 3,327
Referee: Kateryna Monzul (Ukraine)
16 October 2013
20:55

Paris Saint-Germain (France)	0–0	(Sweden) Tyresö
	Report

Stade Sébastien Charléty, Paris
Attendance: 591
Referee: Teodora Albon (Romania)

Tyresö won 2–1 on aggregate.

10 October 2013
18:00

Konak Belediyesi (Turkey)	2–1	(Poland) Unia Racibórz
Dușa 9'; Çınar 31'	Report	Mika 43'

İzmir Alsancak Stadium, İzmir
Attendance: 3,532
Referee: Petra Chudá (Slovakia)
17 October 2013
14:00

Unia Racibórz (Poland)	0–0	(Turkey) Konak Belediyesi
	Report

OSiR Stadium, Racibórz
Attendance: 1,800
Referee: Elia Martinez (Spain)

Konak Belediyesi won 2–1 on aggregate.

10 October 2013
15:00

Apollon Limassol (Cyprus)	1–2	(Austria) Neulengbach
Spencer 88'	Report	Burger 13', 69'

Tsirion Stadium, Limassol
Attendance: 800
Referee: Lina Lehtovaara (Finland)
16 October 2013
19:00

Neulengbach (Austria)	1–1	(Cyprus) Apollon Limassol
Bíróová 58'	Report	Farrelly 77'

Wienerwaldstadion, Neulengbach
Attendance: 750
Referee: Yuliya Medvedeva-Keldyusheva (Kazakhstan)

Neulengbach won 3–2 on aggregate.

9 October 2013
15:00

Spartak Subotica (Serbia)	2–4	(Russia) Rossiyanka
Nahi 3'; Meffometou 80'	Report	Shlyapina 24', 37' (pen.), 48'; Nyandeni 27'

Subotica City Stadium, Subotica
Attendance: 800
Referee: Floarea Ionescu (Romania)
17 October 2013
13:00

Rossiyanka (Russia)	1–1	(Serbia) Spartak Subotica
Yakovyshyn 87'	Report	M. Nikolić 5'

Krasnoarmeysk Stadium, Krasnoarmeysk
Attendance: 330
Referee: Séverine Zinck (France)

Rossiyanka won 5–3 on aggregate.

9 October 2013
19:00

Spratzern (Austria)	2–2	(Italy) Torres
Billa 52', 70'	Report	Fuselli 56'; Marchese 90'

Voithplatz, St. Pölten
Attendance: 1,150
Referee: Lilach Asulin (Israel)
16 October 2013
15:00

Torres (Italy)	3–1	(Austria) Spratzern
Mändly 30'; Panico 44'; Iannella 83'	Report	Makas 84'

Stadio Vanni Sanna, Sassari
Attendance: 343
Referee: Rhona Daly (Ireland)

Torres won 5–3 on aggregate.

10 October 2013
15:00

MTK (Hungary)	0–5	(Germany) Turbine Potsdam
	Report	Mjelde 11'; Andonova 30'; Draws 32'; Evans 34', 76'

Hidegkuti Nándor Stadium, Budapest
Attendance: 851
Referee: Knarik Grigoryan (Armenia)
16 October 2013
19:00

Turbine Potsdam (Germany)	6–0	(Hungary) MTK
Nagasato 62', 90+2'; Andonova 63', 88'; Göransson 65', 84'	Report

Karl-Liebknecht-Stadion, Potsdam
Attendance: 1,480
Referee: Eleni Lampadariou (Greece)

Turbine Potsdam won 11–0 on aggregate.

9 October 2013
19:00

Twente (Netherlands)	0–4	(France) Lyon
	Report	Nécib 22'; Kumagai 31'; Tonazzi 52'; Schelin 60'

De Grolsch Veste, Enschede
Attendance: 2,963
Referee: Sandra Bastos (Portugal)
16 October 2013
19:00

Lyon (France)	6–0	(Netherlands) Twente
Tonazzi 13'; Nécib 25'; Bussaglia 60'; Le Sommer 73'; Schelin 81'; Rapinoe 84'	Report

Stade de Gerland, Lyon
Attendance: 6,752
Referee: Pernilla Larsson (Sweden)

Lyon won 10–0 on aggregate.

10 October 2013
19:00

Lillestrøm SK (Norway)	1–3	(Sweden) Malmö
Haavi 42'	Report	Sjögran 25'; Melis 44'; Bachmann 65'

Åråsen Stadion, Lillestrøm
Attendance: 917
Referee: Carina Vitulano (Italy)
16 October 2013
18:45

Malmö (Sweden)	5–0	(Norway) Lillestrøm SK
Mittag 17', 31'; Melis 21', 84'; Bachmann 34'	Report

Malmö Stadion, Malmö
Attendance: 591
Referee: Morag Pirie (Scotland)

Malmö won 8–1 on aggregate.

9 October 2013
17:00

Pärnu JK (Estonia)	0–14	(Germany) Wolfsburg
	Report	Magull 8', 19', 51' (pen.), 53'; Fischer 21', 26'; Müller 22', 87' (pen.), 90+2'; Blässe 34'; Pohlers 46', 47', 59'; Popp 84'

A. Le Coq Arena, Tallinn
Attendance: 1,178
Referee: Eszter Urban (Hungary)
16 October 2013
17:00

Wolfsburg (Germany)	13–0	(Estonia) Pärnu JK
Meyer 6', 47', 59'; Damnjanović 8', 61'; Bunte 12'; Pohlers 19', 72', 87'; Keßler 31', 80'; Odebrecht 45'; Jakabfi 83'	Report

VfL-Stadion am Elsterweg, Wolfsburg
Attendance: 795
Referee: Zuzana Kováčová (Slovakia)

Wolfsburg won 27–0 on aggregate.

9 October 2013
19:00

Barcelona (Spain)	0–0	(Denmark) Brøndby
	Report

Mini Estadi, Barcelona
Attendance: 827
Referee: Gyöngyi Gaál (Hungary)
16 October 2013
18:30

Brøndby (Denmark)	2–2	(Spain) Barcelona
Thorsen 25'; Boye Sørensen 90+4'	Report	Corredera 52'; Čanković 87'

Brøndby Stadium, Brøndby
Attendance: 5,653
Referee: Cristina Dorcioman (Romania)

2–2 on aggregate. Barcelona won on away goals.

9 October 2013
19:00

Zürich (Switzerland)	2–1	(Czech Republic) Sparta Prague
Zehnder 24'; Kiwic 60'	Report	Bartoňová 44'

Letzigrund, Zürich
Attendance: 3,653
Referee: Sara Persson (Sweden)
16 October 2013
20:00

Sparta Prague (Czech Republic)	1–1	(Switzerland) Zürich
Mocová 66'	Report	Selimi 16'

Generali Arena, Prague
Attendance: 1,843
Referee: Amy Rayner (England)

Zürich won 3–2 on aggregate.

== Round of 16 ==
Team 1	Agg.	Team 2	1st leg	2nd leg
Zorkiy Krasnogorsk (Russia)	2–7	(England) Birmingham City	0–2	2–5
Arsenal (England)	6–2	(Scotland) Glasgow City	3–0	3–2
Fortuna Hjørring (Denmark)	1–6	(Sweden) Tyresö	1–2	0–4
Konak Belediyesi (Turkey)	0–6	(Austria) Neulengbach	0–3	0–3
Rossiyanka (Russia)	1–2	(Italy) Torres	1–0	0–2
Turbine Potsdam (Germany)	(a) 2–2	(France) Lyon	0–1	2–1
Malmö (Sweden)	2–5	(Germany) Wolfsburg	1–2	1–3
Barcelona (Spain)	6–1	(Switzerland) Zürich	3–0	3–1

9 November 2013
14:00

Zorkiy Krasnogorsk (Russia)	0–2	(England) Birmingham City
	Report	Christiansen 27'; Potter 57'

Rodina Stadium, Khimki
Attendance: 280
Referee: Riem Hussein (Germany)
13 November 2013
20:00

Birmingham City (England)	5–2	(Russia) Zorkiy Krasnogorsk
Christiansen 4'; Linnett 9', 66'; Harrop 50'; Lawley 76'	Report	Ruiz 29'; Nick 42'

St Andrew's, Birmingham
Attendance: 1,062
Referee: Carina Vitulano (Italy)

Birmingham City won 7–2 on aggregate.

9 November 2013
14:00

Arsenal (England)	3–0	(Scotland) Glasgow City
Houghton 14'; Carter 43', 63'	Report

The Hive Stadium, London
Attendance: 869
Referee: Teodora Albon (Romania)
13 November 2013
20:00

Glasgow City (Scotland)	2–3	(England) Arsenal
Lappin 2'; Corsie 79'	Report	Yankey 12'; Nobbs 69'; Scott 90+3'

Petershill Park, Glasgow
Attendance: 1,300
Referee: Pernilla Larsson (Sweden)

Arsenal won 6–2 on aggregate.

9 November 2013
15:00

Fortuna Hjørring (Denmark)	1–2	(Sweden) Tyresö
Nadim 83'	Report	Press 54', 67'

Hjørring Stadion, Hjørring
Attendance: 877
Referee: Séverine Zinck (France)
14 November 2013
19:15

Tyresö (Sweden)	4–0	(Denmark) Fortuna Hjørring
Engen 15'; van de Ven 27'; Marta 45'; Boquete 45+2'	Report

Tyresövallen, Tyresö
Attendance: 1,928
Referee: Amy Rayner (England)

Tyresö won 6–1 on aggregate.

10 November 2013
12:00

Konak Belediyesi (Turkey)	0–3	(Austria) Neulengbach
	Report	Burger 35', 75', 89'

İzmir Alsancak Stadium, İzmir
Attendance: 5,000
Referee: Jenny Palmqvist (Sweden)
14 November 2013
19:00

Neulengbach (Austria)	3–0	(Turkey) Konak Belediyesi
Hanschitz 33'; Bíróová 67'; Burger 76'	Report

Wienerwaldstadion, Neulengbach
Attendance: 920
Referee: Bibiana Steinhaus (Germany)

Neulengbach won 6–0 on aggregate.

9 November 2013
11:00

Rossiyanka (Russia)	1–0	(Italy) Torres
Cimini 18' (o.g.)	Report

Krasnoarmeysk Stadium, Krasnoarmeysk
Attendance: 334
Referee: Morag Pirie (Scotland)
14 November 2013
15:00

Torres (Italy)	2–0	(Russia) Rossiyanka
Conti 27'; Panico 63'	Report

Stadio Vanni Sanna, Sassari
Attendance: 277
Referee: Esther Staubli (Switzerland)

Torres won 2–1 on aggregate.

10 November 2013
16:00

Turbine Potsdam (Germany)	0–1	(France) Lyon
	Report	Nécib 83'

Karl-Liebknecht-Stadion, Potsdam
Attendance: 4,180
Referee: Jana Adámková (Czech Republic)
14 November 2013
20:00

Lyon (France)	1–2	(Germany) Turbine Potsdam
Abily 12'	Report	Draws 33'; Mjelde 73' (pen.)

Stade de Gerland, Lyon
Attendance: 9,949
Referee: Kateryna Monzul (Ukraine)

2–2 on aggregate. Turbine Potsdam won on away goals.

9 November 2013
16:00

Malmö (Sweden)	1–2	(Germany) Wolfsburg
Bachmann 64'	Report	Popp 34'; Müller 85' (pen.)

Malmö Stadion, Malmö
Attendance: 742
Referee: Katalin Kulcsár (Hungary)
13 November 2013
19:00

Wolfsburg (Germany)	3–1	(Sweden) Malmö
Goeßling 16'; Wensing 27'; Müller 89'	Report	Gunnarsdóttir 71'

VfL-Stadion am Elsterweg, Wolfsburg
Attendance: 1,124
Referee: Cristina Dorcioman (Romania)

Wolfsburg won 5–2 on aggregate.

10 November 2013
12:00

Barcelona (Spain)	3–0	(Switzerland) Zürich
Sonia 1', 90'; Losada 70'	Report

Mini Estadi, Barcelona
Attendance: 1,169
Referee: Monika Mularczyk (Poland)
13 November 2013
19:00

Zürich (Switzerland)	1–3	(Spain) Barcelona
Zehnder 24'	Report	García 36'; Corredera 64'; Čanković 82'

Letzigrund, Zürich
Attendance: 7,304
Referee: Anastasia Pustovoitova (Russia)

Barcelona won 6–1 on aggregate.

== Quarter-finals ==
An open draw for the quarterfinals and the following rounds on was held 21 November 2013. Matches were played on 22/23 and 29/30 March 2014.

Team 1	Agg.	Team 2	1st leg	2nd leg
Birmingham City (England)	3–0	(England) Arsenal	1–0	2–0
Tyresö (Sweden)	8–1	(Austria) Neulengbach	8–1	0–0
Torres (Italy)	1–12	(Germany) Turbine Potsdam	0–8	1–4
Wolfsburg (Germany)	5–0	(Spain) Barcelona	3–0	2–0

Notes

1. Order of legs reversed after original draw.
24 March 2014
20:00

Birmingham City (England)	1–0	(England) Arsenal
Allen 26'	Report

St Andrew's, Birmingham
Attendance: 2,671
Referee: Esther Staubli (Switzerland)
30 March 2014
15:00

Arsenal (England)	0–2	(England) Birmingham City
	Report	Linnett 25'; Allen 32'

The Hive Stadium, London
Attendance: 1,054
Referee: Bibiana Steinhaus (Germany)

Birmingham won 3–0 on aggregate.

23 March 2014
14:45

Tyresö (Sweden)	8–1	(Austria) Neulengbach
Press 1', 64', 80'; Marta 5', 27', 85'; Dahlkvist 31'; Edlund 74'	Report	Tseng Shu-o 68'

Tyresövallen, Tyresö
Attendance: 1,749
Referee: Riem Hussein (Germany)
29 March 2014
16:00

Neulengbach (Austria)	0–0	(Sweden) Tyresö
	Report

Wienerwaldstadion, Neulengbach
Attendance: 1,255
Referee: Efthalia Mitsi (Greece)

Tyresö won 8–1 on aggregate.

23 March 2014
15:00

Torres (Italy)	0–8	(Germany) Turbine Potsdam
	Report	Tucceri Cimini 2' (o.g.); Wälti 27'; Bremer 28'; Simic 44', 53'; Añonma 55'; Elsig 78'; Evans 79'

Stadio Vanni Sanna, Sassari
Attendance: 562
Referee: Cristina Dorcioman (Romania)
30 March 2014
13:00

Turbine Potsdam (Germany)	4–1	(Italy) Torres
Nagasato 38'; Wälti 43'; Hegerberg 54', 85'	Report	Domenichetti 49'

Karl-Liebknecht-Stadion, Potsdam
Attendance: 2,830
Referee: Gyöngyi Gaál (Hungary)

Potsdam won 12–1 on aggregate.

23 March 2014
17:15

Wolfsburg (Germany)	3–0	(Spain) Barcelona
Keßler 34'; Müller 52'; Jakabfi 65'	Report

VfL-Stadion am Elsterweg, Wolfsburg
Attendance: 7,985
Referee: Morag Pirie (Scotland)
30 March 2014
12:15

Barcelona (Spain)	0–2	(Germany) Wolfsburg
	Report	Keßler 45+1'; Müller 74'

Mini Estadi, Barcelona
Attendance: 793
Referee: Teodora Albon (Romania)

Wolfsburg won 5–0 on aggregate.

== Semi-finals ==
Matches were played on 19 and 27 April 2014.

Team 1	Agg.	Team 2	1st leg	2nd leg
Birmingham City (England)	0–3	(Sweden) Tyresö	0–0	0–3
Turbine Potsdam (Germany)	2–4	(Germany) Wolfsburg	0–0	2–4

19 April 2014
15:00

Birmingham City (England)	0–0	(Sweden) Tyresö
	Report

Damson Park, Solihull
Attendance: 1,580
Referee: Teodora Albon (Romania)
27 April 2014
14:45

Tyresö (Sweden)	3–0	(England) Birmingham City
Press 61', 72'; Marta 90+3'	Report

Tyresövallen, Tyresö
Attendance: 2,128
Referee: Carina Vitulano (Italy)

Tyresö won 3–0 on aggregate.

19 April 2014
14:00

Turbine Potsdam (Germany)	0–0	(Germany) Wolfsburg
	Report

Karl-Liebknecht-Stadion, Potsdam
Attendance: 5,110
Referee: Efthalia Mitsi (Greece)
27 April 2014
17:15

Wolfsburg (Germany)	4–2	(Germany) Turbine Potsdam
Keßler 17'; Popp 41', 46'; Müller 80'	Report	Simic 7'; Añonma 35'

Volkswagen Arena, Wolfsburg
Attendance: 10,791
Referee: Esther Staubli (Switzerland)

Wolfsburg won 4–2 on aggregate.

== Final ==
22 May 2014
19:30 WEST

Tyresö (Sweden)	3–4	(Germany) Wolfsburg
Marta 28', 56'; Boquete 30'	Report	Popp 47'; Müller 53', 80'; Faißt 68'

Estádio do Restelo, Lisbon
Attendance: 11,217
Referee: Kateryna Monzul (Ukraine)
