= Amela Fetahović =

Bosnian footballer (1986–2021)

Personal information
- Date of birth: 17 April 1986
- Place of birth: SFR Yugoslavia
- Date of death: 4 November 2021 (aged 35)
- Place of death: Sarajevo, Bosnia and Herzegovina
- Position: Midfielder

Senior career*
Years	Team	Apps	(Gls)
2003–2015	SFK Sarajevo		
2015–2016	Spartak Subotica		

International career
2005–2016	Bosnia and Herzegovina		
- * Club domestic league appearances and goals

Amela Fetahović (17 April 1986 – 4 November 2021) was a Bosnian footballer who played as a midfielder for Serbian side Spartak Subotica and in the Bosnian League for SFK Sarajevo. With SFK Sarajevo, she played in the Champions League. She was a member of the Bosnian national team.

== Death ==
Fetahović died on 4 November 2021, aged 35, following a car crash in Sarajevo.
