= Tyresö FF =

- Full name: Tyresö Fotbollsförening
- Founded: 1971
- Ground: Trollbäckens BP; Tyresö; Sweden
- Capacity: 2,700
- Chairman: Hans Lindberg
- League: Division 1 Mellersta
- 2024: Division 1 Mellersta, 9th of 14
Home colours	Away colours

Tyresö Fotbollsförening is a Swedish football club in Tyresö, a municipality in Stockholm County. The club was founded in 1971 and is primarily known for its main women's team, which competed in the top-tier league Damallsvenskan between 1993 and 1996, in 1999, and between in 2010 and 2014, winning the Swedish Championship in 2012. Notable players that have played for the team include the most capped footballer of all time Kristine Lilly, joint FIFA Female Player of the Century Michelle Akers and six-time FIFA World Player of the Year Marta.

Tyresö FF are affiliated to the Stockholms Fotbollförbund. In 2011 and 2012, they finished runners-up in the Swedish Cup. In the 2012 season, Tyresö won Damallsvenskan title for the first time. The club reached the 2014 Champions League Final but experienced serious financial problems that year, with the club's parent joint-stock company Tyresö Fotboll AB going bankrupt on 24 June 2014. The team withdrew from the 2014–15 Champions League season, with Linköpings FC taking their spot. During the 2014 season, the team withdrew from Damallsvenskan, meaning they would be relegated to the fourth-tier league Division 2.

In 2017 the team started again in the third tier Division 1. It reached mid table places in the next two seasons.

The club has an associated men's team who play in the lower categories.

== History ==
=== 2000s ===
In 2005 a young Tyresö team were relegated to Division 3, the regionalised fourth tier of Swedish women's football. That autumn Hans Löfgren joined the club's board as football manager and presided over a swift rise through the divisions. Two successive promotions in 2006 and 2007 were followed by a year of consolidation in 2008; finishing sixth in the Division 1. Promotion back to the Damallsvenskan was secured in 2009. By attracting a network of sponsors Löfgren had funded the increasingly ambitious acquisition of new players every season. By the time the club returned to the top level Damallsvenskan in 2010, Jennifer Egelryd was the only player who remained from the 2005 Third Division team.

After two fourth-placed finishes in 2010 and 2011, Tyresö won the Damallsvenskan title on the last day of the 2012 season after beating rivals LdB FC Malmö 1–0. In doing so they qualified for the UEFA Women's Champions League for the first time. Löfgren had withdrawn from day-to-day involvement with the club in late 2011, after his conviction for buying sex. In Sweden it is illegal to buy sex, but not to sell it.

=== Insolvency (2014) ===
The club faced serious financial problems in 2014, yet achieved sporting success. The team reached the Final of the 2013–14 UEFA Women's Champions League.

In March 2014 reports emerged that Tyresö Fotboll AB, the female club's parent joint-stock company, was in arrears with its tax payments and on the verge of bankruptcy. Club chairman Hans Lindberg blamed loss of sponsorship and the cost of building a new stand at Tyresövallen stadium for the shortfall. The club asked the local authority for a one-off grant of SEK 2.7 million to continue trading, but the request was unanimously rejected. Instead, a debt restructuring plan was drawn up, which included an aid project designed in cooperation with an unnamed African state.

Later in March 2014, the district court in Nacka ruled that Tyresö Fotboll AB could continue with their restructuring plan. The Swedish Tax Agency had intended to block the plans and force the club out of business, but changed their minds after receiving more detailed information about repayments. As the Government of Sweden guarantees the wages of citizens whose employers go bankrupt, up to SEK 176,000, the players' salaries were paid. But the club remained in a form of administration, so prize money from the UEFA Women's Champions League would go to the Government and Tax Agency first, as the highest priority creditors. This also meant that large contractual bonuses promised to the players would not be paid.

It became clear that Tyresö's large and expensively assembled squad would break up. The club announced in April 2014 that leading players Marta, Caroline Seger and Verónica Boquete were all leaving the club when their contracts expired in June 2014. This was in addition to the three American players who had already committed to return to the National Women's Soccer League (NWSL) when Tyresö's UEFA Women's Champions League campaign ended. In late April Birmingham City Ladies manager David Parker described Tyresö FF as female "galácticos" before they beat his team 3–0 in the UEFA Women's Champions League semi-final.

As of early June 2014, Tyresö Fotboll AB had racked up a debt of nearly 10 million SEK. The club filed for continued debt restructuring but it was turned down on 10 June 2014. The team withdrew from the 2014–15 Champions League season, with the 2013 Damallsvenskan's third-placed team Linköpings FC taking their spot. Having played eight matches in the 2014 Damallsvenskan, the team withdrew from the league on 5 June 2014 due to lack of players, meaning they would be relegated to the fourth-tier league Division 2. All their results were nullified and deleted from the table.

On 24 June 2014, Tyresö Fotboll AB went bankrupt and ceased to exist. It was uncertain whether the main women's team would continue play in the 2015 season, although the club had another women's team playing in the third-tier league Division 1 as of the 2014 season.

=== Division 1 (2017–2019) ===
Tyresö FF has competed in third-tier Division 1 since 2017.

== Season results ==
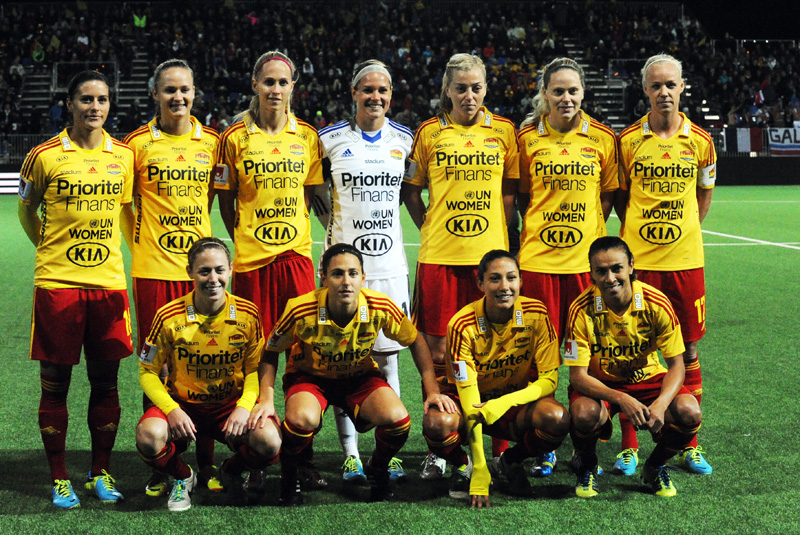
Tyresö FF team, October 2013

Season	Level	Division	Section	Position	Movements
1993	Tier 1	Damallsvenskan		8th	
1994	Tier 1	Damallsvenskan		6th	
1995	Tier 1	Damallsvenskan		9th	
1996	Tier 1	Damallsvenskan		11th	Relegated
1997	Tier 2	Division 1	Mellersta		
1998	Tier 2	Division 1	Mellersta	1st	Promoted
1999	Tier 1	Damallsvenskan		10th	Relegated
2000	Tier 2	Division 1	Norra	10th	Relegated
2001	Tier 3	Division 2	Östra Svealand	4th	
2002	Tier 3	Division 2	Östra Svealand	2nd	
2003	Tier 3	Division 2	Östra Svealand	2nd	
2004	Tier 3	Division 2	Östra Svealand	4th	
2005	Tier 3	Division 2	Östra Svealand	9th	Relegated
2006	Tier 4	Division 3	Stockholm B	1st	Promoted
2007	Tier 3	Division 2	Östra Svealand	1st	Promotion Playoffs – Promoted
2008	Tier 2	Division 1	Norrettan	6th	
2009	Tier 2	Division 1	Norrettan	1st	Promoted
2010	Tier 1	Damallsvenskan		4th	
2011	Tier 1	Damallsvenskan		4th	
2012	Tier 1	Damallsvenskan		1st	Winner
2013	Tier 1	Damallsvenskan		2nd	
2014	Tier 1	Damallsvenskan		—	Withdrew midseason Relegated per regulations
2015	Tier 4	Division 2		5th	
2016	Tier 4	Division 2		1st	
2017	Tier 3	Division 1	Södra Svealand	5th	
2018	Tier 3	Division 1	Södra Svealand	3rd	
2019	Tier 3	Division 1	Södra Svealand	4th	
2020	Tier 3	Division 1	Södra Svealand	2nd	
2021	Tier 3	Division 1	Södra Svealand	4th	
2022	Tier 3	Division 1	Södra Svealand	3rd	
2023	Tier 3	Division 1	Mellersta		

== Stadium ==
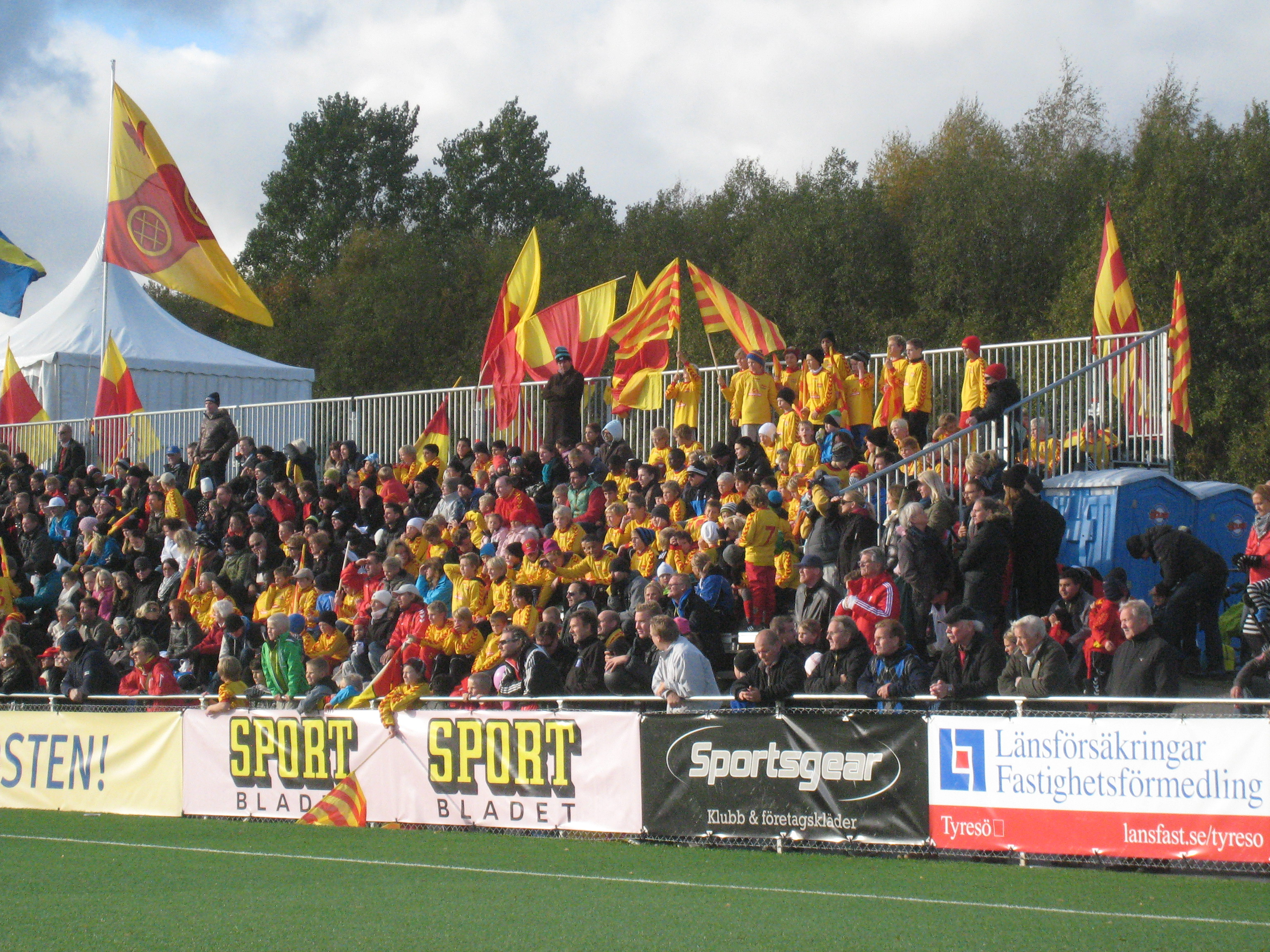
Tyresö FF supporters, October 2011

Tyresö currently play at Tyresövallen, a football stadium located in Tyresö, Sweden. The stadium holds capacity for 2,700 spectators. It features a synthetic pitch that is 105x65 meters, an audio system and game clock.

== Broadcasting ==
Tyresö FF games are broadcast on TV4 Sport in Sweden. Matches are also available live via the TV4 Sport website.

== Record in UEFA Women's Champions League ==
All results (away, home and aggregate) list Tyresö's goal tally first.

Season	Round	Club	Away	Home	Aggregate
2013–14	Round of 32	(France) Paris Saint-Germain	0–0	2–1 ^{a}	2–1
2013–14	Round of 16	(Denmark) Fortuna Hjørring	2–1 ^{a}	4–0	6–1
2013–14	Quarter-final	(Austria) Neulengbach	0–0	8–1 ^{a}	8–1
2013–14	Semi-final	(England) Birmingham City	0–0 ^{a}	3–0	3–0
2013–14	Final	(Germany) Wolfsburg	3–4 ( (Portugal) Lisbon)		

^{a} First leg.

== Current squad ==
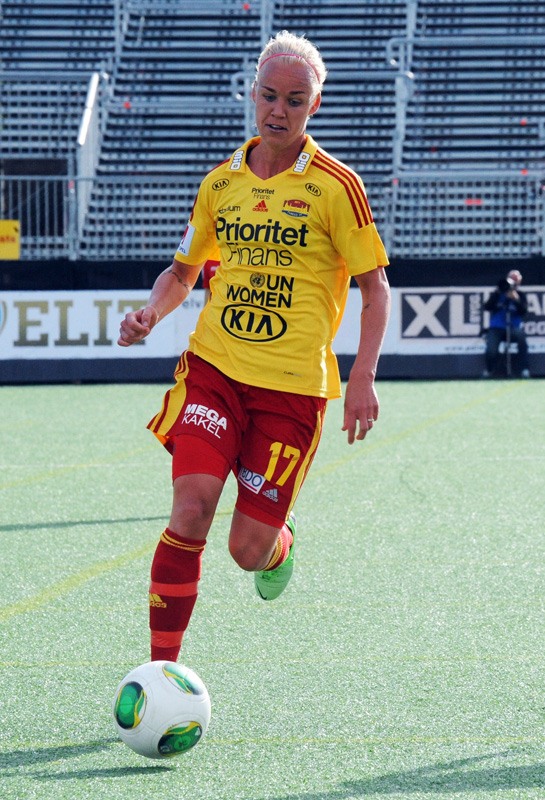
Caroline Seger, June 2013

As of 9 May 2024

Note: Flags indicate national team as defined under FIFA eligibility rules; some limited exceptions apply. Players may hold more than one non-FIFA nationality.

No.	Pos.	Nation	Player
1	GK	SWE	Karolina Sundberg
2	DF	SWE	Ella Bergström
3	DF	SWE	Josefine Lindberg
4	MF	SWE	Alice Bengtzon Schéele
6	FW	SWE	Clara Schefte
7	DF	SWE	Filippa Pettersson (captain)
9	FW	SWE	Elsa Bengtsson
11	FW	SWE	Klara Grahn
13	MF	SWE	Victoria Isaksson
16	MF	SWE	Elsa Bromé
17	FW	SWE	Sophie Andersson

No.	Pos.	Nation	Player
18	FW	SWE	Fialisa Söderberg
19	MF	SWE	Meja Frimmel
20	MF	SWE	Liv Borgman
21	GK	SWE	Martina Ehnberg
25	MF	SWE	Leila Baiche
77	GK	SWE	Jennifer Bakai
—	DF	SWE	Emilia Irle
—	MF	SWE	Valentina Wallin
—	MF	SWE	Elin Bragnum
—	MF	SWE	Emma Åström
—	FW	BIH	Nina Garibija
—	FW	SWE	Sofia Svensson

=== Former players ===
For details of current and former players, see Category:Tyresö FF players.

== Technical staff ==
As of 25 April 2023

- Director of sport: Simon Brolund
- Manager: Robin Carlén
- Goalkeeping coach: Kristoffer Larsson

== Honours ==
- UEFA Women's Champions League:
  - Runner up (1): 2014
- Damallsvenskan:
  - Champions (1): 2012
- Svenska Cupen:
  - Runner up (2): 2011, 2012
