= Stephanie Bunte =

German association footballer (born 1989)

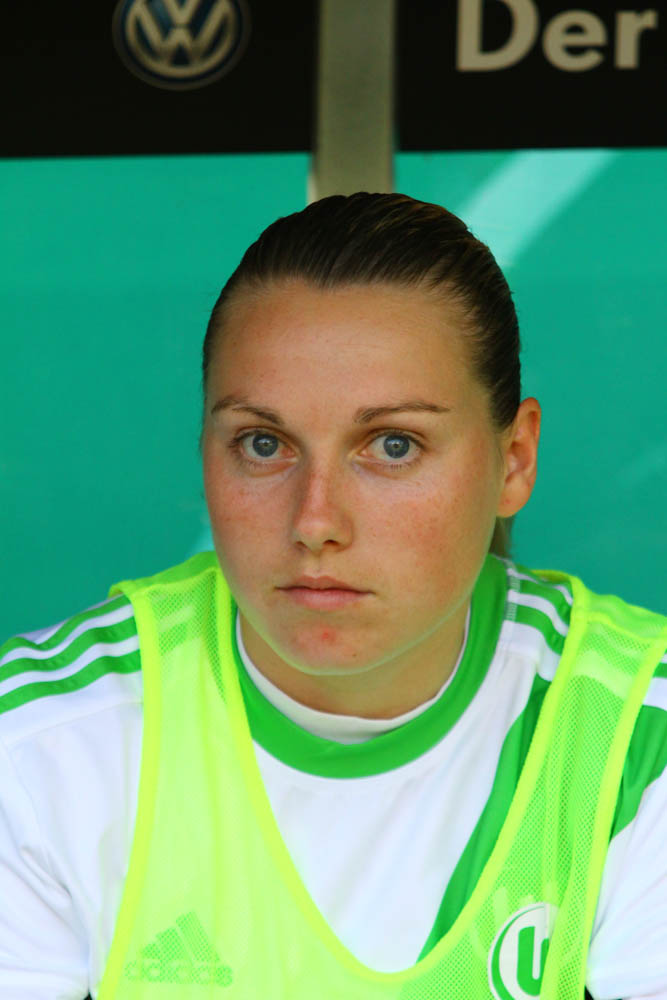

Personal information
- Date of birth: 29 December 1989 (age 36)
- Place of birth: Paderborn, West Germany
- Height: 1.62 m (5 ft 4 in)
- Position: Midfielder

Team information
- Current team: Wolfsburg

International career
Years	Team	Apps	(Gls)
- Germany (women U-19)

Stephanie Bunte (born 14 February 1989) is a retired German footballer who played as a midfielder.
