= 2012 Damallsvenskan =

Damallsvenskan
- Season: 2012
- Champions: Tyresö FF
- UEFA Women's Champions League: Tyresö, LdB Malmö
- Top goalscorer: Anja Mittag (21 goals)
- Biggest home win: Linköping 11–0 Djurgården
- Biggest away win: Örebro 0–6 Kopparbergs/Göteborg

The 2012 Damallsvenskan, part of the 2012 Swedish football season, was the 25th season of Damallsvenskan since its establishment in 1988. The 2012 fixtures were released on 8 December 2011. The season began on 9 April 2012 and ended on 3 November 2012. LdB FC Malmö were the defending champions, having won their 7th title the previous season. In an interesting season finish Malmö had a five-point advantage over Tyresö two days before the end. On the second last matchday though Malmö only drew, while Tyresö won and the teams then met on the final matchday to play for the championship. Due to a better goal difference Tyresö won its first title after a late goal for a 1–0 win.

A total of twelve teams contested the league, 10 returning from the 2011 season and two promoted from Division 1.

== Teams ==
Hammarby IF and Dalsjöfors GoIF were relegated at the end of the 2011 season after finishing in the bottom two places of the table. They were replaced by Division 1 division champions AIK and Vittsjö GIK.

=== Stadia and locations ===
Locations of the 2012 Damallsvenskan teams

Team	Location	Stadium	Stadium capacity (Note: According to each club information page at the Swedish Football Association website for Allsvenskan.)
AIK	Stockholm	Skytteholms IP	3,000
Djurgårdens IF	Stockholm	Kristinebergs IP	930
Kopparbergs/Göteborg FC	Gothenburg	Valhalla IP	3,000
Jitex BK	Mölndal	Åbyvallen	2,000
Kristianstads DFF	Kristianstad	Vilans IP	5,000
Linköpings FC	Linköping	Folkungavallen	8,000
LdB FC Malmö	Malmö	Malmö IP	6,800
Piteå IF	Piteå	LF Arena	3,000
Tyresö FF	Tyresö	Tyresövallen	3,500
Umeå IK	Umeå	T3 Arena	8,000
Vittsjö GIK	Vittsjö	Vittsjö IP	1,500
KIF Örebro DFF	Örebro	Behrn Arena	13,500

== Table ==
Pos	Team	Pld	W	D	L	GF	GA	GD	Pts	Qualification or relegation
1	Tyresö FF (C, Q)	22	18	1	3	65	12	+53	55	Qualification to Champions League Round of 32
2	LdB FC Malmö (Q)	22	18	1	3	61	24	+37	55	Qualification to Champions League Round of 32
3	Linköpings FC	22	11	6	5	50	34	+16	39	
4	Kopparbergs/Göteborg FC	22	12	2	8	48	25	+23	38	
5	Kristianstads DFF	22	10	4	8	37	27	+10	34	
6	Vittsjö GIK	22	9	3	10	37	42	−5	30	
7	Umeå IK	22	7	5	10	27	47	−20	26	
8	Piteå IF	22	8	1	13	35	42	−7	25	
9	Jitex BK	22	6	5	11	26	36	−10	23	
10	KIF Örebro DFF	22	7	1	14	26	52	−26	22	
11	Djurgårdens IF (R)	22	6	1	15	21	55	−34	19	Relegation to Elitettan
12	AIK (R)	22	3	4	15	16	46	−30	13	Relegation to Elitettan

Rules for classification: 1) Points; 2) Goal difference; 3) Number of goals scored
(C) Champions; (Q) Qualified for the phase indicated; (R) Relegated

== Results ==
Home \ Away	AIK	DIF	KGFC	JBK	KDFF	LFC	LdB	PIF	TFF	UIK	VGIK	KIFÖ
AIK		0–1	1–0	3–1	2–3	1–3	2–0	0–3	0–4	2–2	1–1	0–2
Djurgårdens IF	2–1		0–2	0–2	0–1	1–4	1–2	4–3	2–0	1–0	1–1	3–1
Kopparbergs/Göteborg FC	1–1	2–0		3–3	3–0	6–0	0–1	2–1	0–1	5–0	1–2	2–1
Jitex BK	2–0	2–0	1–3		3–1	0–0	1–4	2–2	1–3	1–1	1–2	0–1
Kristianstads DFF	3–0	4–3	4–1	1–3		1–1	0–3	3–2	0–2	0–1	3–1	4–0
Linköpings FC	0–0	11–0	3–2	4–0	1–1		3–5	4–1	1–0	4–1	4–3	1–1
LdB FC Malmö	5–0	4–0	2–1	2–0	5–2	2–1		3–1	0–1	7–1	4–1	2–1
Piteå IF	3–0	3–1	1–3	0–1	2–0	0–1	0–2		1–5	3–1	2–0	3–0
Tyresö FF	1–0	2–0	3–1	3–0	1–2	3–0	2–0	5–1		6–0	5–1	7–0
Umeå IK	3–1	2–0	0–3	1–1	0–2	1–1	1–1	2–0	1–5		4–1	0–1
Vittsjö GIK	3–1	4–1	0–1	1–0	2–1	3–0	2–3	2–1	1–1	2–3		0–1
KIF Örebro DFF	3–0	3–0	0–6	1–0	1–4	2–3	3–4	1–2	0–5	0–2	3–4	

Source: svenskfotboll.se (in Swedish)
Legend: Blue = home team win; Yellow = draw; Red = away team win.

== Season prizes ==
Prize	Player	Club
MVP	(Germany) Anja Mittag	LdB Malmö
Best goalkeeper	(Iceland) Þóra Björg Helgadóttir	LdB Malmö
Best defender	(Sweden) Emma Berglund	Umeå
Best midfielder	(Spain) Verónica Boquete	Tyresö FF
Best forward	(Germany) Anja Mittag	LdB Malmö
Best young player	(Sweden) Elin Rubensson	LdB Malmö

== Season statistics ==
=== Top scorers ===
Rank	Player	Club	Goals
1	(Germany) Anja Mittag	LdB FC Malmö	21
2	(United States) Christen Press	Kopparbergs/Göteborg FC	17
3	(Netherlands) Manon Melis	Linköpings FC	16
4	(Switzerland) Ramona Bachmann	LdB FC Malmö	15
5	(Sweden) Jennifer Nobis	Piteå IF	13
5	(Sweden) Madeleine Edlund	Tyresö FF	13
7	(Brazil) Marta	Tyresö FF	12
8	(United States) Danesha Adams	Vittsjö GIK	10
8	(Sweden) Sofie Andersson	Vittsjö GIK	10
8	(Netherlands) Kirsten van de Ven	Tyresö FF	10

=== Top assists ===
Rank	Player	Club	Assists
1	(Brazil) Marta	Tyresö FF	16
2	(Sweden) Madeleine Edlund	Tyresö FF	9
3	(Spain) Verónica Boquete	Tyresö FF	8
3	(Sweden) Elin Rubensson	LdB FC Malmö	8
5	(Finland) Tuija Hyyrynen	Umeå IK	6
5	(Sweden) Petra Larsson	Linköpings FC	6
5	(Germany) Anja Mittag	LdB FC Malmö	6
5	(Denmark) Johanna Rasmussen	Kristianstads DFF	6
5	(Sweden) Caroline Seger	Tyresö FF	6
10	8 players		5
