= 2013–14 UEFA Women's Champions League =

13th edition of the European women's club football championship organized by UEFA

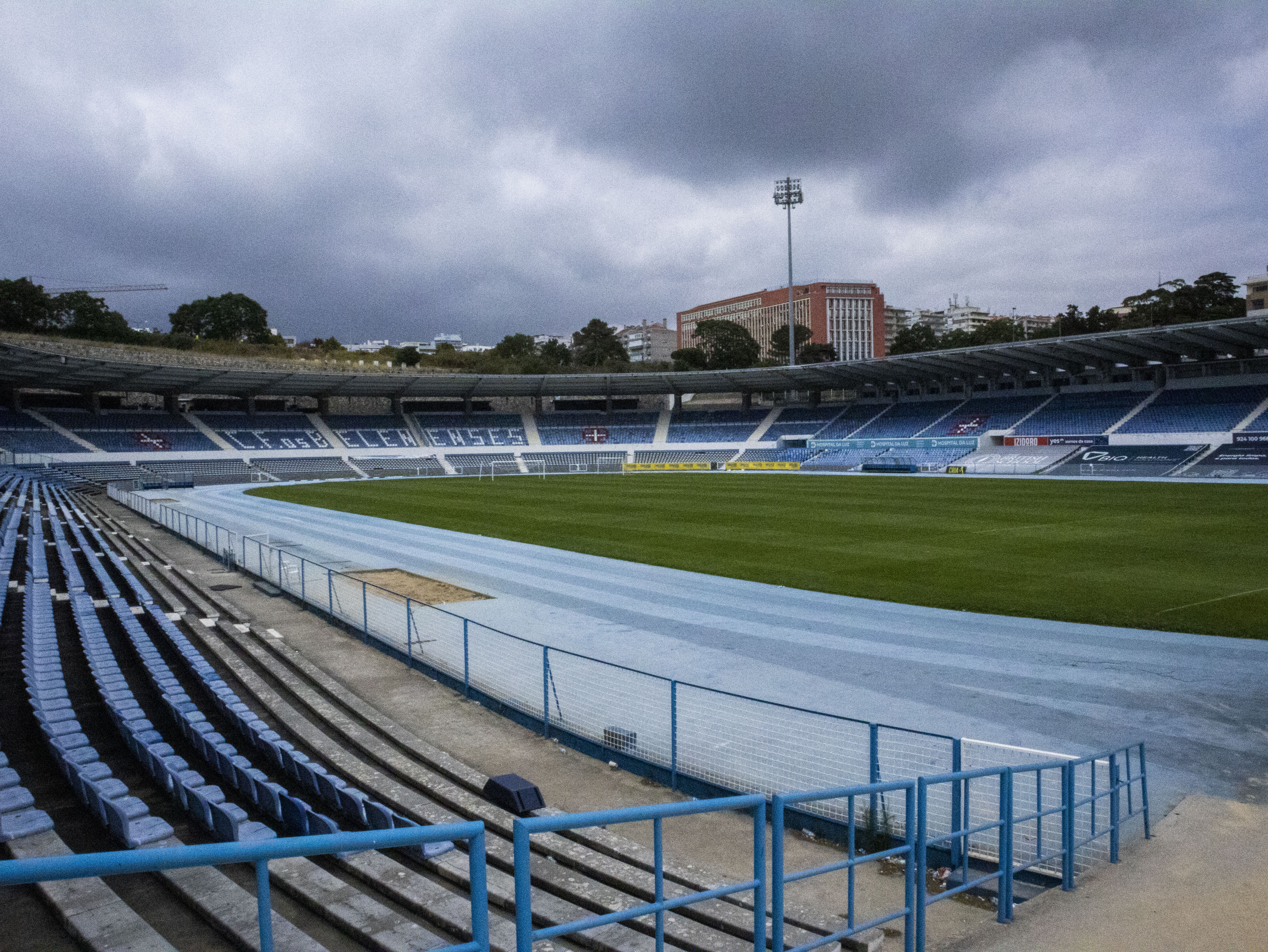
- The Estádio do Restelo hosted the final.

Tournament details
- Dates: 8 August 2013 to 22 May 2014
- Teams: 54

Final positions
- Champions: (Germany) Wolfsburg (2nd title)
- Runners-up: (Sweden) Tyresö

Tournament statistics
- Matches played: 109
- Goals scored: 447 (4.1 per match)
- Attendance: 151,010 (1,385 per match)
- Top scorer(s): Milena Nikolić; 11 goals

The 2013–14 UEFA Women's Champions League was the 13th edition of the European women's championship for football clubs. The final was held at Estádio do Restelo, Lisbon, Portugal.

German team VfL Wolfsburg won the title over Swedish club Tyresö FF after turning a 0–2 into a 4–3 win. Wolfsburg became the third side to defend the Champions League title.

== Team allocation and distribution ==
Austria had overtaken Norway for 8th place in the UEFA coefficient ranking and thus assured themselves a second entry.

Countries were allocated places according to their UEFA league coefficient for women. Here CH denotes the national champion, RU the national runner-up, Ned 1 and Bel 1 the best placed Belgian and Dutch team in their joint league.

54 teams entered the competition, with KÍ Klaksvík retaining their record being the only team to play all editions of the UEFA Women's Cup and Women's Champions League so far.

Round of 32
(Germany) Wolfsburg (CH)	(Germany) Potsdam (RU)	(France) Lyon (CH)	(France) Paris Saint-Germain (RU)
(Sweden) Tyresö (CH)	(Sweden) Malmö (RU)	(Russia) Zorkiy Krasnogorsk (CH)	(Russia) Rossiyanka (RU)
(England) Arsenal (CH)	(England) Birmingham City (RU)	(Italy) Torres (CH)	(Italy) Tavagnacco (RU)
(Denmark) Brøndby (CH)	(Denmark) Fortuna Hjørring (RU)	(Austria) Neulengbach (CH)	(Austria) Spratzern (RU)
(Spain) Barcelona (CH)	(Czech Republic) Sparta Prague (CH)	(Norway) Lillestrøm SK (CH)	(Belgium) Standard Liège (Bel 1)
(Iceland) Thór/KA (CH)	(Kazakhstan) CSHVSM Kairat (CH)		
Qualifying round
(Belarus) Babruichanka Babruisk (CH)	(Scotland) Glasgow City (CH)	(Poland) Unia Racibórz (CH)	(Switzerland) Zürich (CH)
(Netherlands) Twente (Ned 1)	(Ukraine) Zhytlobud-1 Kharkiv (CH)	(Finland) PK-35 Vantaa (CH)	(Greece) PAOK (CH)
(Hungary) MTK (CH)	(Romania) Olimpia Cluj (CH)	(Serbia) Spartak Subotica (CH)	(Cyprus) Apollon Limassol (CH)
(Portugal) Atlético Ouriense (CH)	(Israel) ASA Tel Aviv University (CH)	(Bulgaria) NSA Sofia (CH)	(Bosnia and Herzegovina) SFK 2000 (CH)
(Republic of Ireland) Raheny United (CH)	(Slovenia) Pomurje (CH)	(Slovakia) Nové Zámky (CH)	(Lithuania) Gintra Universitetas (CH)
(Croatia) Osijek (CH)	(Faroe Islands) KÍ Klaksvík (CH)	(Wales) Cardiff City (CH)	(North Macedonia) Biljanini Izvori (CH)
(Estonia) Pärnu JK (CH)	(Turkey) Konak Belediyesi (CH)	(Moldova) Goliador Chişinău (CH)	(Northern Ireland) Crusaders Strikers (CH)
(Malta) Birkirkara (CH)	(Latvia) Liepājas Metalurgs (CH)	(Albania) Ada (CH)	(Montenegro) Ekonomist (CH)

== Round and draw dates ==
UEFA has scheduled the competition as follows.

Round	Draw	First leg	Second leg
Qualifying round	27 June 2013	8–13 August 2013	
Round of 32	5 September 2013	9–10 October 2013	16–17 October 2013
Round of 16	5 September 2013	9–10 November 2013	13–14 November 2013
Quarterfinals	21 November 2013	22–23 March 2014	29–30 March 2014
Semifinals	21 November 2013	19–20 April 2014	26–27 April 2014
Final	21 November 2013	22 May 2014	

== Qualifying round ==
32 teams entered in the qualifying round, and were divided into eight groups of four teams, with one team from each seeding pot. Host countries won't be drawn together.

Groups were played as mini tournaments over a span of six days.

=== Group 1 ===
Pos	Team	Pld	W	D	L	GF	GA	GD	Pts	Qualification	KBB	SFK	NSA	CAR
1	(Turkey) Konak Belediyesi	3	3	0	0	5	1	+4	9	Advance to main round	—	–	–	1–0
2	(Bosnia and Herzegovina) SFK 2000	3	2	0	1	7	4	+3	6		1–2	—	–	3–0
3	(Bulgaria) NSA Sofia	3	1	0	2	4	5	−1	3		0–2	2–3	—	–
4	(Wales) Cardiff City	3	0	0	3	0	6	−6	0		–	–	0–2	—

Source: UEFA

=== Group 2 ===
Pos	Team	Pld	W	D	L	GF	GA	GD	Pts	Qualification	SUB	OCL	GIN	LIE
1	(Serbia) Spartak Subotica	3	3	0	0	24	3	+21	9	Advance to main round	—	8–3	–	10–0
2	(Romania) Olimpia Cluj	3	2	0	1	13	8	+5	6		–	—	3–0	7–0
3	(Lithuania) Gintra Universitetas	3	1	0	2	2	9	−7	3		0–6	–	—	–
4	(Latvia) Liepājas Metalurgs	3	0	0	3	0	19	−19	0		–	–	0–2	—

Source: UEFA

=== Group 3 ===
Pos	Team	Pld	W	D	L	GF	GA	GD	Pts	Qualification	MTK	Z1K	RAH	CNS
1	(Hungary) MTK	3	3	0	0	6	2	+4	9	Advance to main round	—	–	3–2	2–0
2	(Ukraine) Zhytlobud-1 Kharkiv	3	2	0	1	7	2	+5	6		0–1	—	–	5–0
3	(Republic of Ireland) Raheny United	3	1	0	2	5	6	−1	3		–	1–2	—	–
4	(Northern Ireland) Crusaders Strikers	3	0	0	3	1	9	−8	0		–	–	1–2	—

Source: UEFA

=== Group 4 ===
Pos	Team	Pld	W	D	L	GF	GA	GD	Pts	Qualification	ZÜR	OUR	EKO	KKL
1	(Switzerland) Zürich	3	3	0	0	12	1	+11	9	Advance to main round	—	5–0	4–1	–
2	(Portugal) Atlético Ouriense	3	1	1	1	3	7	−4	4		–	—	–	2–1
3	(Montenegro) Ekonomist	3	0	2	1	3	6	−3	2		–	1–1	—	–
4	(Faroe Islands) KÍ Klaksvík	3	0	1	2	2	6	−4	1		0–3	–	1–1	—

Source: UEFA

=== Group 5 ===
Pos	Team	Pld	W	D	L	GF	GA	GD	Pts	Qualification	UNR	POM	BOB	ADA
1	(Poland) Unia Racibórz	3	2	1	0	10	1	+9	7	Advance to main round	—	3–1	–	7–0
2	(Slovenia) Pomurje	3	2	0	1	17	4	+13	6		–	—	3–1	–
3	(Belarus) Bobruichanka Bobruisk	3	1	1	1	4	4	0	4		0–0	–	—	3–1
4	(Albania) Ada	3	0	0	3	1	23	−22	0		–	0–13	–	—

Source: UEFA

=== Group 6 ===
Pos	Team	Pld	W	D	L	GF	GA	GD	Pts	Qualification	PK35	PJK	PAOK	BIL
1	(Finland) PK-35 Vantaa	3	2	1	0	15	2	+13	7	Advance to main round	—	–	2–1	13–1
2	(Estonia) Pärnu JK	3	2	1	0	6	2	+4	7	Advance to main round	0–0	—	–	–
3	(Greece) PAOK	3	1	0	2	7	5	+2	3		–	1–3	—	5–0
4	(North Macedonia) Biljanini Izvori	3	0	0	3	2	21	−19	0		–	1–3	–	—

Source: UEFA

=== Group 7 ===
Pos	Team	Pld	W	D	L	GF	GA	GD	Pts	Qualification	APL	UNZ	ASA	GOL
1	(Cyprus) Apollon Limassol	3	3	0	0	6	0	+6	9	Advance to main round	—	2–0	–	1–0
2	(Slovakia) Nové Zámky	3	1	1	1	6	2	+4	4		–	—	0–0	–
3	(Israel) ASA Tel Aviv University	3	1	1	1	6	3	+3	4		0–3	–	—	6–0
4	(Moldova) Goliador Chişinău	3	0	0	3	0	13	−13	0		–	0–6	–	—

Source: UEFA

=== Group 8 ===
Pos	Team	Pld	W	D	L	GF	GA	GD	Pts	Qualification	GLA	TWE	OSI	BIR
1	(Scotland) Glasgow City	3	3	0	0	18	0	+18	9	Advance to main round	—	–	7–0	9–0
2	(Netherlands) Twente	3	2	0	1	10	2	+8	6	Advance to main round	0–2	—	–	6–0
3	(Croatia) Osijek	3	1	0	2	7	12	−5	3		–	0–4	—	–
4	(Malta) Birkirkara	3	0	0	3	1	22	−21	0		–	–	1–7	—

Source: UEFA

=== Ranking of second-placed teams ===
To determine the two best second-placed teams from the qualifying round which advanced to the round of 32, only the results of the second-placed teams against the first and third-placed teams in their group are taken into account.

== Knockout phase ==
22 teams enter the competition in the round of 32. They are joined by ten teams from the qualifying round. Teams marked (Q) advanced from qualifying.

Seeded:

- (France) Lyon
- (Germany) Turbine Potsdam
- (England) Arsenal
- (Russia) Rossiyanka
- (Italy) Torres
- (Germany) Wolfsburg
- (Denmark) Brøndby
- (Sweden) LdB Malmö
- (Czech Republic) Sparta Praha
- (Denmark) Fortuna Hjørring
- (France) Paris S-G
- (Austria) Neulengbach
- (Russia) Zorkiy Krasnogorsk
- (Scotland) Glasgow City (Q)
- (England) Birmingham City
- (Poland) Unia Racibórz (Q)

Unseeded:

- (Sweden) Tyresö
- (Switzerland) Zürich (Q)
- (Belgium) Standard Liège
- (Cyprus) Apollon Limassol (Q)
- (Italy) Tavagnacco
- (Kazakhstan) CSHVSM Kairat
- (Hungary) MTK (Q)
- (Spain) Barcelona
- (Norway) Lillestrøm SK
- (Finland) PK-35 Vantaa (Q)
- (Iceland) Thór/KA
- (Austria) Spratzern
- (Netherlands) Twente (Q)
- (Serbia) Spartak Subotica (Q)
- (Estonia) Pärnu JK (Q)
- (Turkey) Konak Belediyesi (Q)

=== Bracket ===
Round of 32
(Iceland) Thór/KA	1	1	2
(Russia) Z. Krasnogorsk	2	4	6
(Finland) PK-35 Vantaa	0	0	0
(England) Birmingham City	3	1	4
(Kazakhstan) CSHVSM Kairat	1	1	2
(England) Arsenal	7	11	18
(Belgium) Standard Liège	2	1	3
(Scotland) Glasgow City	2	3	5
(Italy) Tavagnacco	3	0	3
(Denmark) Fortuna Hjørring	2	2	4
(Sweden) Tyresö	2	0	2
(France) Paris Saint-Germain	1	0	1
(Turkey) Konak Belediyesi	2	0	2
(Poland) Unia Racibórz	1	0	1
(Cyprus) Apollon Limassol	1	1	2
(Austria) Neulengbach	2	1	3
(Serbia) Spartak Subotica	2	1	3
(Russia) Rossiyanka	4	1	5
(Austria) Spratzern	2	1	3
(Italy) Torres	2	3	5
(Hungary) MTK	0	0	0
(Germany) Turbine Potsdam	5	6	11
(Netherlands) Twente	0	0	0
(France) Lyon	4	6	10
(Norway) Lillestrøm SK	1	0	1
(Sweden) Malmö	3	5	8
(Estonia) Pärnu JK	0	0	0
(Germany) Wolfsburg	14	13	27
(Spain) Barcelona (a)	0	2	2
(Denmark) Brøndby	0	2	2
(Switzerland) Zürich	2	1	3
(Czech Republic) Sparta Prague	1	1	2

Round of 16
(Russia) Zorkiy Krasnogorsk	0	2	2
(England) Birmingham City	2	5	7
(England) Arsenal	3	3	6
(Scotland) Glasgow City	0	2	2
(Denmark) Fortuna Hjørring	1	0	1
(Sweden) Tyresö	2	4	6
(Turkey) Konak Belediyesi	0	0	0
(Austria) Neulengbach	3	3	6
(Russia) Rossiyanka	1	0	1
(Italy) Torres	0	2	2
(Germany) Turbine Potsdam (a)	0	2	2
(France) Lyon	1	1	2
(Sweden) Malmö	1	1	2
(Germany) Wolfsburg	2	3	5
(Spain) Barcelona	3	3	6
(Switzerland) Zürich	0	1	1

Quarterfinals
(England) Birmingham City	1	2	3
(England) Arsenal	0	0	0
(Sweden) Tyresö	8	0	8
(Austria) Neulengbach	1	0	1
(Italy) Torres	0	1	1
(Germany) Turbine Potsdam	8	4	12
(Germany) Wolfsburg	3	2	5
(Spain) Barcelona	0	0	0

Semifinals
(England) Birmingham City	0	0	0
(Sweden) Tyresö	0	3	3
(Germany) Turbine Potsdam	0	2	2
(Germany) Wolfsburg	0	4	4

Final
(Sweden) Tyresö	3
(Germany) Wolfsburg	4

=== Round of 32 ===
The round of 32 and round of 16 was drawn on 5 September 2013. Teams from the same association or qualifying group could not be drawn together. Seeded teams played the second leg at home. Teams are awarded 20,000 Euro for both legs. A sum criticized to be too small by team managers, leaving teams like Arsenal who have to fly by plane with financial losses.

Team 1	Agg.	Team 2	1st leg	2nd leg
Thór/KA (Iceland)	2–6	(Russia) Zorkiy Krasnogorsk	1–2	1–4
PK-35 Vantaa (Finland)	0–4	(England) Birmingham City	0–3	0–1
CSHVSM Kairat (Kazakhstan)	2–18	(England) Arsenal	1–7	1–11
Standard Liège (Belgium)	3–5	(Scotland) Glasgow City	2–2	1–3
Tavagnacco (Italy)	3–4	(Denmark) Fortuna Hjørring	3–2	0–2
Tyresö (Sweden)	2–1	(France) Paris Saint-Germain	2–1	0–0
Konak Belediyesi (Turkey)	2–1	(Poland) Unia Racibórz	2–1	0–0
Apollon Limassol (Cyprus)	2–3	(Austria) Neulengbach	1–2	1–1
Spartak Subotica (Serbia)	3–5	(Russia) Rossiyanka	2–4	1–1
Spratzern (Austria)	3–5	(Italy) Torres	2–2	1–3
MTK (Hungary)	0–11	(Germany) Turbine Potsdam	0–5	0–6
Twente (Netherlands)	0–10	(France) Lyon	0–4	0–6
Lillestrøm SK (Norway)	1–8	(Sweden) Malmö	1–3	0–5
Pärnu JK (Estonia)	0–27	(Germany) Wolfsburg	0–14	0–13
Barcelona (Spain)	2–2 (a)	(Denmark) Brøndby	0–0	2–2
Zürich (Switzerland)	3–2	(Czech Republic) Sparta Prague	2–1	1–1

=== Round of 16 ===
Team 1	Agg.	Team 2	1st leg	2nd leg
Zorkiy Krasnogorsk (Russia)	2–7	(England) Birmingham City	0–2	2–5
Arsenal (England)	6–2	(Scotland) Glasgow City	3–0	3–2
Fortuna Hjørring (Denmark)	1–6	(Sweden) Tyresö	1–2	0–4
Konak Belediyesi (Turkey)	0–6	(Austria) Neulengbach	0–3	0–3
Rossiyanka (Russia)	1–2	(Italy) Torres	1–0	0–2
Turbine Potsdam (Germany)	(a) 2–2	(France) Lyon	0–1	2–1
Malmö (Sweden)	2–5	(Germany) Wolfsburg	1–2	1–3
Barcelona (Spain)	6–1	(Switzerland) Zürich	3–0	3–1

=== Quarter-finals ===
An open draw for the quarterfinals and the following rounds on was held 21 November 2013. Matches were played on 22/23 and 29/30 March 2014.

Team 1	Agg.	Team 2	1st leg	2nd leg
Birmingham City (England)	3–0	(England) Arsenal	1–0	2–0
Tyresö (Sweden)	8–1	(Austria) Neulengbach	8–1	0–0
Torres (Italy)	1–12	(Germany) Turbine Potsdam	0–8	1–4
Wolfsburg (Germany)	5–0	(Spain) Barcelona	3–0	2–0

Notes

1. Order of legs reversed after original draw.

=== Semi-finals ===
Matches were played on 19 and 27 April 2014.

Team 1	Agg.	Team 2	1st leg	2nd leg
Birmingham City (England)	0–3	(Sweden) Tyresö	0–0	0–3
Turbine Potsdam (Germany)	2–4	(Germany) Wolfsburg	0–0	2–4

=== Final ===
22 May 2014
19:30 WEST

Tyresö (Sweden)	3–4	(Germany) Wolfsburg
Marta 28', 56'; Boquete 30'	Report	Popp 47'; Müller 53', 80'; Faißt 68'

Estádio do Restelo, Lisbon
Attendance: 11,217
Referee: Kateryna Monzul (Ukraine)

== Statistics ==
The top scorer award includes the qualifying round. Milena Nikolić of Spartak Subotica won that with eleven goals.

The following statistics exclude qualifying round.

=== Top goalscorers ===
Rank	Player	Team	Goals	Minutes played
1	(Germany) Martina Müller	(Germany) Wolfsburg	10	715'
2	(United States) Christen Press	(Sweden) Tyresö	9	810'
3	(Brazil) Marta	(Sweden) Tyresö	7	719'
4	(Germany) Conny Pohlers	(Germany) Wolfsburg	6	170'
4	(England) Danielle Carter	(England) Arsenal	6	440'
4	(Austria) Nina Burger	(Austria) Neulengbach	6	540'
7	(Scotland) Kim Little	(England) Arsenal	5	360'
7	(Germany) Alexandra Popp	(Germany) Wolfsburg	5	612'
7	(Germany) Nadine Kessler	(Germany) Wolfsburg	5	734'
10	(Germany) Lina Magull	(Germany) Wolfsburg	4	270'
10	(England) Jordan Nobbs	(England) Arsenal	4	341'
10	(England) Kirsty Linnett	(England) Birmingham City	4	648'
