= Gyöngyi Gaál =

Hungarian football referee

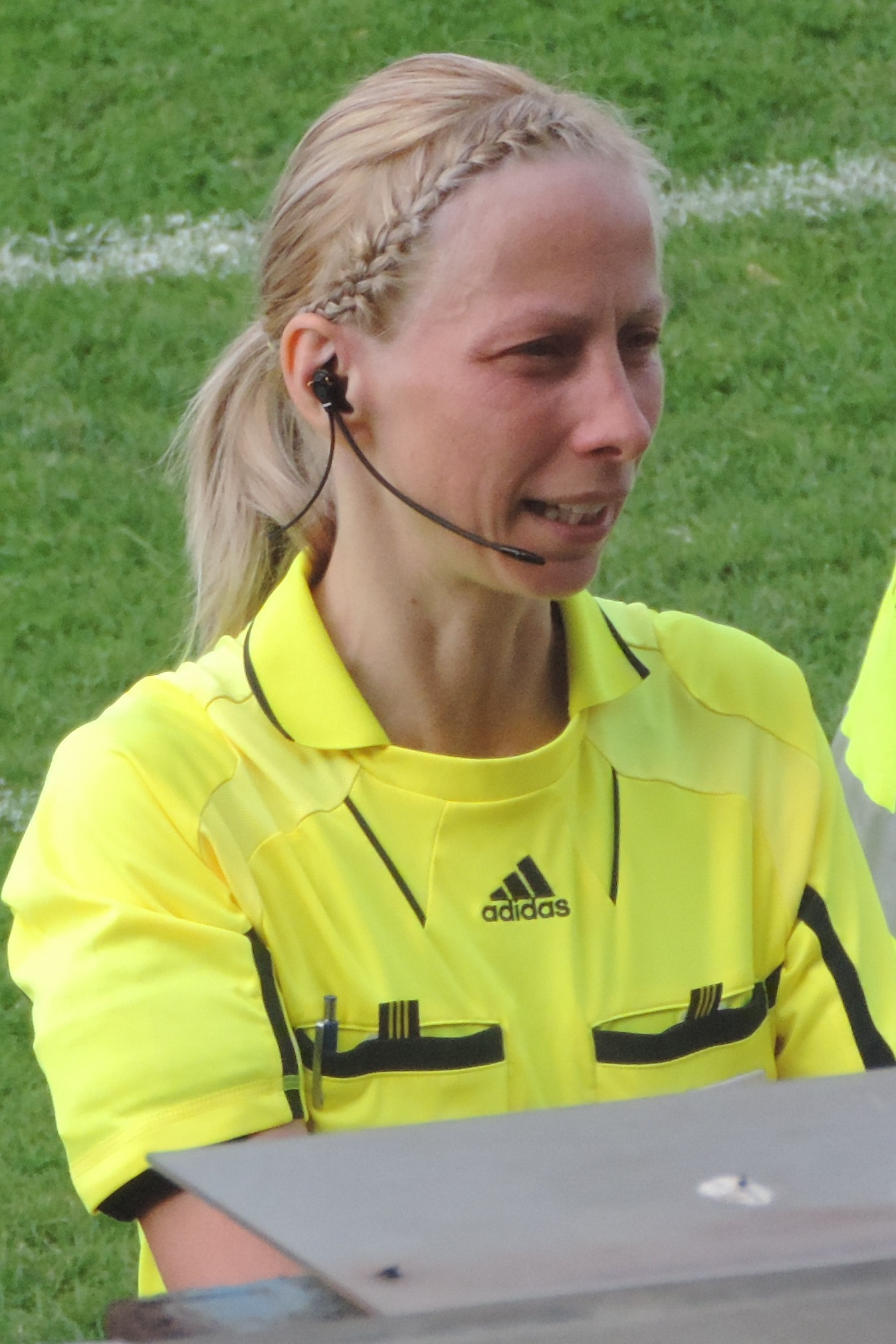
- Full name: Gyöngyi Krisztína Gaál
- Born: 26 June 1975 (age 51); Ajka, Hungary

International
Years	League	Role
2002 –	FIFA listed	Referee

Gyöngyi Krisztína Gaál (born 26 June 1975, in Ajka) is a Hungarian football referee.

== Refereeing career ==
Gyöngyi Gaál refereed her first international match in 2002 between Romania and Croatia.

She officiated at the 2007 FIFA Women's World Cup, taking charge of two group matches, a quarter final and the third place playoff.

=== Controversy ===
In a UEFA Women's Cup match between Montpellier and Frankfurt, the Montpellier team left the field for fifteen to twenty minutes after an incident in the Montpellier attacking penalty area.

During a match between Equatorial Guinea and Australia at the 2011 FIFA Women's World Cup she allowed play to continue after an Equatorial Guinean defender caught the ball in the Australian penalty area. She later apologised for the error.
