= Dyanne Bito =

Dutch footballer (born 1981)

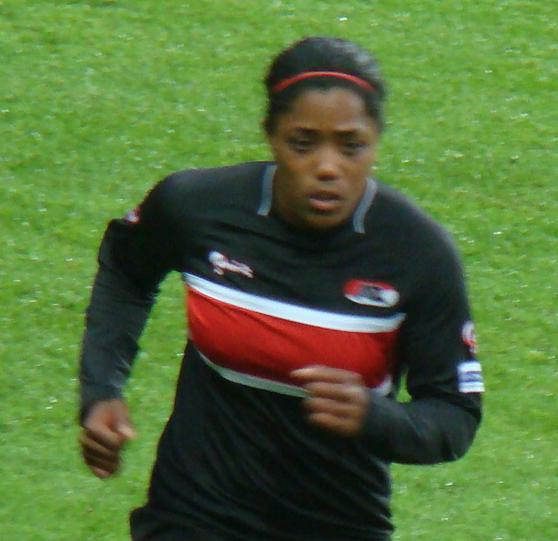
- Bito with AZ Alkmaar

Personal information
- Full name: Dyanne Marie Christine Bito
- Date of birth: 10 August 1981 (age 45)
- Place of birth: Sint Michiel, Curaçao
- Height: 1.63 m (5 ft 4 in)
- Positions: Forward; defender

Youth career
- 1994–1998: Geel-Wit
- 1998–2000: TYBB

Senior career*
| Years | Team | Apps | (Gls) |
| 2000–2004 | Wartburgia | | |
| 2004–2007 | Heike Rheine | 63 | (30) |
| 2007–2008 | ADO Den Haag | 16 | (3) |
| 2008–2011 | AZ Alkmaar | 65 | (3) |
| 2011–2015 | Telstar | 84 | (5) |

International career
| 2000–2015 | Netherlands | 146 | (6) |
- * Club domestic league appearances and goals

Dyanne Marie Christine Bito (Dutch pronunciation: [diˈjɑnə maːˈri krɪsˈtinə ˈbitoː]; born 10 August 1981) is a Dutch former footballer who played as a forward or defender for the Netherlands national team and clubs in the Netherlands and Germany.

== Club career ==
Bito began her career in Haarlem where she played for Geel-Wit in 1994, she moved to The Yellow Black Boys (TYBB) in 1998 and to ASV Wartburgia in 2000.

In 2004, she signed with FFC Heike Rheine of the German Bundesliga. She stayed 3 seasons in Germany and scored 30 league goals in 63 league appearances.

She returned to the Netherlands ahead of the 2007–08 season and played for ADO Den Haag in the inaugural women's Eredivisie. Until that point in her career, Bito played as a forward but at ADO she began playing as a right-back. She also made her debut in the UEFA Women's Cup (now known as UEFA Women's Champions League) during the 2007–08 UEFA Women's Cup first qualifying round match against KÍ of the Faroe Islands.

In 2008, she signed with AZ Alkmaar and won the Eredivisie titles in 2008–09 and 2009–10. Bito won the KNVB Women's Cup in 2010–11, she played in the final where AZ defeated SC Heerenveen by 2–0.

When AZ decided to stop its women's football activities after the conclusion of the 2010–11 season, Bito was amongst the many players who moved to newly created club Telstar. She played in the BeNe League, when it replaced the Eredivisie in 2012. After four seasons at the club, Bito announced her retirement from football in 2015.

== International career ==
For 15 years, Bito was a member of the Dutch national team. Her debut came against Hungary on 14 October 2000, she came on as a substitute in the 75th minute of a qualification match for the UEFA Women's Euro 2001 play-off which the Netherlands won 3–0.

She was part of the Dutch squad which played the UEFA Women's Euro 2009 in Finland. In December 2009, then national coach Vera Pauw left Bito and Claudia van den Heiligenberg out of the squad ahead of a match against Belarus. The decision proved controversial and it was reported that the duo were kicked out because they were in a relationship. Pauw angrily dismissed the claims, saying it was an insult to suggest they were excluded because of their relationship. Van den Heiligenberg and Bito remained together and both were restored to the national team by incoming national coach Roger Reijners in 2010.

On 22 April 2010, Bito made her 100th appearance for the Dutch national team at a 2011 FIFA Women's World Cup qualification match against Macedonia.

In June 2013 national team coach Roger Reijners selected Bito in the squad for UEFA Women's Euro 2013 in Sweden.

Reijners selected Bito as part of the Dutch squad for the 2015 FIFA Women's World Cup in Canada. Shortly after the conclusion of the tournament, she announced her retirement from football and by that time, she was the second most capped Dutch international player with 146 appearances (behind only Annemieke Kiesel's 156).

== Career statistics ==
Scores and results list the Netherlands goal tally first.

| Goal # | Date | Venue | Opponent | Score | Result | Competition |
|---|---|---|---|---|---|---|
| 1. | 20 March 2001 | Gemeentelijk Stadion, Kontich, Belgium | Belgium | 4–0 | 4–0 | Friendly |
| 2. | 8 May 2001 | West Lothian Courier Stadium, Livingston, Scotland | Scotland | 4–0 | 4–0 | Friendly |
| 3. | 9 October 2001 | Gemeentelijk Stadion, Kontich, Belgium | Belgium | 3–2 | 5–2 | Friendly |
| 4. | 27 November 2002 | Sportpark Rijsoord, Ridderkerk, Netherlands | Belgium | 4–0 | 4–0 | Friendly |
| 5. | 17 December 2002 | Estádio Capitão Josino Costa, Lagoa, Portugal | Portugal | 2–1 | 2–1 | Friendly |
| 6. | 9 February 2013 | Regenboogstadion, Waregem, Belgium | Belgium | 1–1 | 3–2 | Friendly |

== Honours ==
AZ Alkmaar

- Eredivisie): 2008–09, 2009–10
- KNVB Women's Cup: 2010–11
