= Barbara Lorsheyd =

Dutch footballer

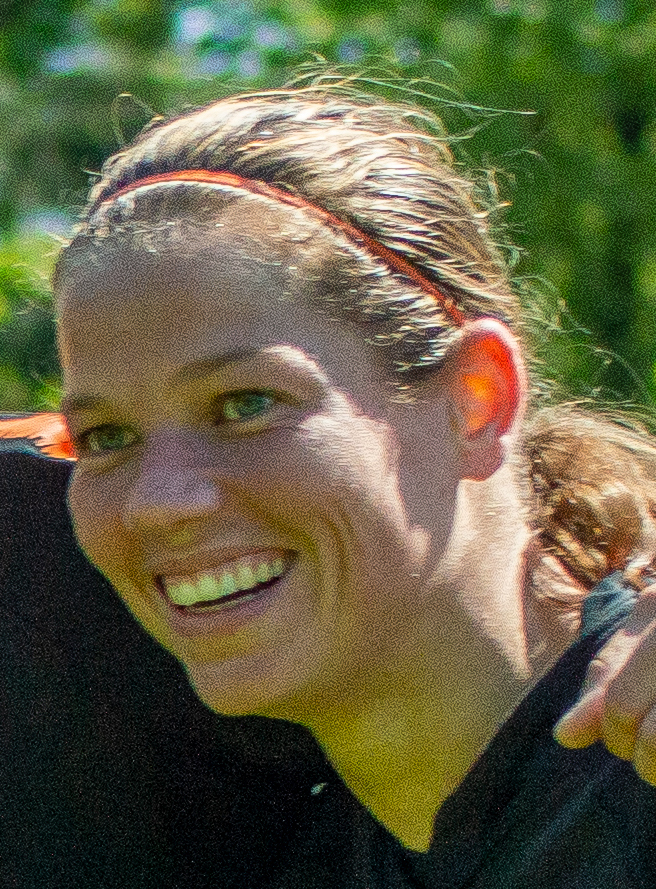
- Lorsheyd in 2019

Personal information
- Date of birth: 26 March 1991 (age 35)
- Place of birth: The Hague, Netherlands
- Height: 1.73 m (5 ft 8 in)
- Position: Goalkeeper

Youth career
- SV Loosduinen
- SV Wateringse Veld
- RKSV GDA

Senior career*
Years	Team	Apps	(Gls)
2007–2014	ADO Den Haag	112	(0)
2014–2016	SC Telstar	38	(0)
2016–2017	Twente	19	(0)
2017–2026	ADO Den Haag	187	(0)

International career^{‡}
2008	Netherlands U17	5	(0)
2008–2009	Netherlands U19	5	(0)
2019	Netherlands U23	1	(0)
2021	Netherlands	1	(0)
- * Club domestic league appearances and goals as of 16:51, 9 October 2026 (UTC) ‡ National team caps and goals as of 16:51, 9 October 2026 (UTC)

Barbara Lorsheyd (also spelled Lorsheijd, born 26 March 1991) is a Dutch former footballer who played as goalkeeper for Eredivisie club ADO Den Haag.

Lorsheyd originally joined ADO in 2007 and subsequently played for SC Telstar and FC Twente, before returning to ADO Den Haag in 2017. She has represented the Netherlands women's national under-19 football team and was called up to the senior Netherlands squad for the first time in 2013, serving as an understudy for eight years before making her official debut in 2021.

== Club career ==
Lorsheyd started with football when she was young and played as a striker. Due to knee problems, her doctor told her she could not continue playing football. However, she decided to become a goalkeeper. She started playing with SV Loosduinen, and later with SV Wateringse Veld and with RKSV GDA.

She began her senior career at ADO Den Haag when the club was formed to join the inaugural 2007–08 season of the Eredivisie Vrouwen. She made her debut at the age of 16, spending seven seasons at the club. During the 2011–12 season she was the main goalkeeper of the team and won both the Eredivisie and the KNVB Beker. The next year she won the KNVB Beker again, making a decisive save from Anouk Dekker in the penalty shootout win over FC Twente. She was named the club's Player of the Season.

After more than 110 Eredivisie appearances for ADO Den Haag and five in the UEFA Women's Champions League, Lorsheyd moved to SC Telstar in 2014. During her time at Telstar, Lorsheyd was disappointed when a transfer to FC Basel Frauen fell through at late notice. She agreed to extend her Telstar contract for another season in June 2015.

Lorsheyd left Telstar after two seasons to sign for national champions FC Twente in June 2016, explaining that she hoped to get back into contention for a place in the national team. With Twente she participated in the 2016–17 UEFA Women's Champions League, including the 4–0 defeat by Barcelona staged at De Grolsch Veste before 7,035 spectators.

Eventually, after three seasons away from Den Haag, Lorsheyd returned to ADO as the team's number one choice in 2017. In April 2019 Lorsheyd made her 188th official appearance for ADO, passing Renate Jansen to become the club's record appearance holder. She played her 200th game for the club in October 2019 and her 300th in November 2023.

In June 2021 Lorsheyd was an experienced member of the ADO Den Haag team beaten 1–0 in the KNVB Beker final by PSV, for whom Joëlle Smits headed the only goal. By November 2024 Lorsheyd had become the first woman to break into the club's all-time top ten appearances list. Lorsheyd announced her retirement from football in May 2026, at the end of her 16th season with ADO and 19th season of top division football in the Netherlands. She played her 370th and final game for ADO Den Haag in May 2026. In total she made 437 official appearances in her football career.

== International career ==
=== Junior ===
In September 2008, Lorsheyd was one of four ADO Den Haag players called up to the Netherlands women's national under-19 football team for a 2009 UEFA Women's Under-19 Championship qualifying round in Lithuania. She made a total of five appearances at under-19 level.

Lorsheyd was named to the newly-formed Netherlands women's national under-23 football team in April 2019, as one of two overage players alongside fellow goalkeeper and former ADO teammate Jennifer Vreugdenhil.

=== Senior ===
Coach Roger Reijners called up Lorsheyd to the senior Netherlands national team for the first time in November 2013, as a replacement for Loes Geurts who had an ankle injury. She was called up to the national team on numerous subsequent occasions but did not make an official appearance for them. She was part of Reijners' 35-player preliminary squad for the 2015 FIFA Women's World Cup in Canada and was also named on stand-by for the 2019 edition in France.

She was part of the pre-selection for the Dutch team at the 2020 Summer Olympics but not included in the final selection. As a relatively rare national team player who was not a full-time professional footballer, Lorsheyd had to make a financial agreement with the Royal Dutch Football Association (KNVB) which allowed her to train full-time in the run up to the tournament.

While training for the tournament in Japan, Lorsheyd collided with Sherida Spitse and inadvertently inflicted a knee ligament injury which ruled her teammate out of the Olympics. Spitse bore no resentment over the incident and the pair sat next to each other at the opening group match, before flying home together. Subsequently Lorsheyd continued to be selected for the Netherlands women's national football team.

In November 2021 Lorsheyd was called up again for a friendly match with Japan, to be staged in her home town of The Hague. In eight years with the national team she had still made no appearances, except for one in an unofficial friendly match with Belgium in 2017. She played the full match in a 0–0 draw with Japan to win her first official cap.

On 31 May 2023, Lorsheyd was named as part of the Netherlands provisional squad for the 2023 FIFA Women's World Cup. When Lorsheyd retired from football in 2026 she had been called up by the senior national team on 53 occasions, but the November 2021 behind closed doors match against Japan remained the only time she was officially capped.

== Personal life ==
Lorsheyd was born in The Hague. She has two brothers, one of whom is her twin. As well as being a footballer Lorsheyd is employed as a swimming teacher.

== Honours ==
- Eredivisie Winner: 2011–12
- KNVB Beker Winner: 2011–12, 2012–13
- BeNe Women's Super Cup: 2012-13
