= Loes Geurts =

Dutch footballer (born 1986)

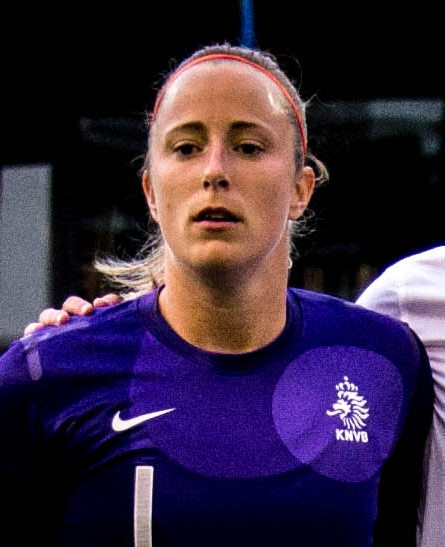
- Geurts in 2014

Personal information
- Date of birth: 12 January 1986 (age 40)
- Place of birth: Wûnseradiel, Netherlands
- Height: 1.68 m (5 ft 6 in)
- Position: Goalkeeper

Youth career
- 1992–1998: R.E.S.
- 1998–1999: Heerenveen
- 1999–2004: R.E.S.

College career
Years	Team	Apps	(Gls)
2004–2006	Western Illinois		

Senior career*
Years	Team	Apps	(Gls)
2006–2007	FFC Heike Rheine	27	(0)
2007–2011	AZ	83	(0)
2011–2012	Telstar	5	(0)
2012–2013	Vittsjö	43	(0)
2014–2016	Kopparbergs/Göteborg FC	32	(0)
2016–2017	Paris Saint-Germain	6	(0)
2018-2020	IFK Göteborg	23	(0)
2021–2024	BK Häcken	27	(0)

International career
2005–2020	Netherlands	125	(0)
Medal record
Women's football
Representing the Netherlands
FIFA Women's World Cup
Silver medal – second place	2019 France	Team
UEFA Women's Championship
Gold medal – first place	2017 Netherlands	Team
- * Club domestic league appearances and goals as of 9 July 2018

Loes Geurts (Dutch pronunciation: [lus ˈxøːrts]; (Note: In isolation, Geurts is pronounced [ɣøːrts].) born 12 January 1986) is a Dutch former footballer who played as a goalkeeper. Since making her international debut in 2005, Geurts has collected over 100 caps for the Netherlands national team. She kept goal for the Netherlands at the 2009 and 2013 editions of the UEFA Women's Championship.

== Club career ==
Geurts' career started at the youth team of club RES in Bolsward. She then played for SC Heerenveen for one season, before returning to RES. In 2004 she played American college soccer for Western Illinois Leathernecks, returning to Europe in March 2006 for the second half of the 2005–06, joining Bundesliga team FFC Heike Rheine.

In 2007, Geurts returned to the Netherlands to play in the newly created professional league Eredivisie with AZ Alkmaar. Her four seasons at the club were very successful, winning the league title three times and the Dutch Cup once. In 2011, she moved to Telstar.

She left Telstar for Sweden's Damallsvenskan in 2012 and joined Vittsjö GIK. Geurts left Vittsjö after her second season in November 2013, signing for Kopparbergs/Göteborg FC, who were in the market for a goalkeeper following Kristin Hammarström's retirement.

After five seasons during four years in Sweden, on 21 September 2016, it was announced she signed a two-year contract with Paris Saint-Germain of the Division 1 Féminine.

In August 2017, citing her "battery was empty", Geurts announced she was taking a break from football.

On 31 January 2018, it was announced that Geurts was returning to Kopparbergs/Göteborg FC where she had previously played from 2014 to 2016.

== International career ==
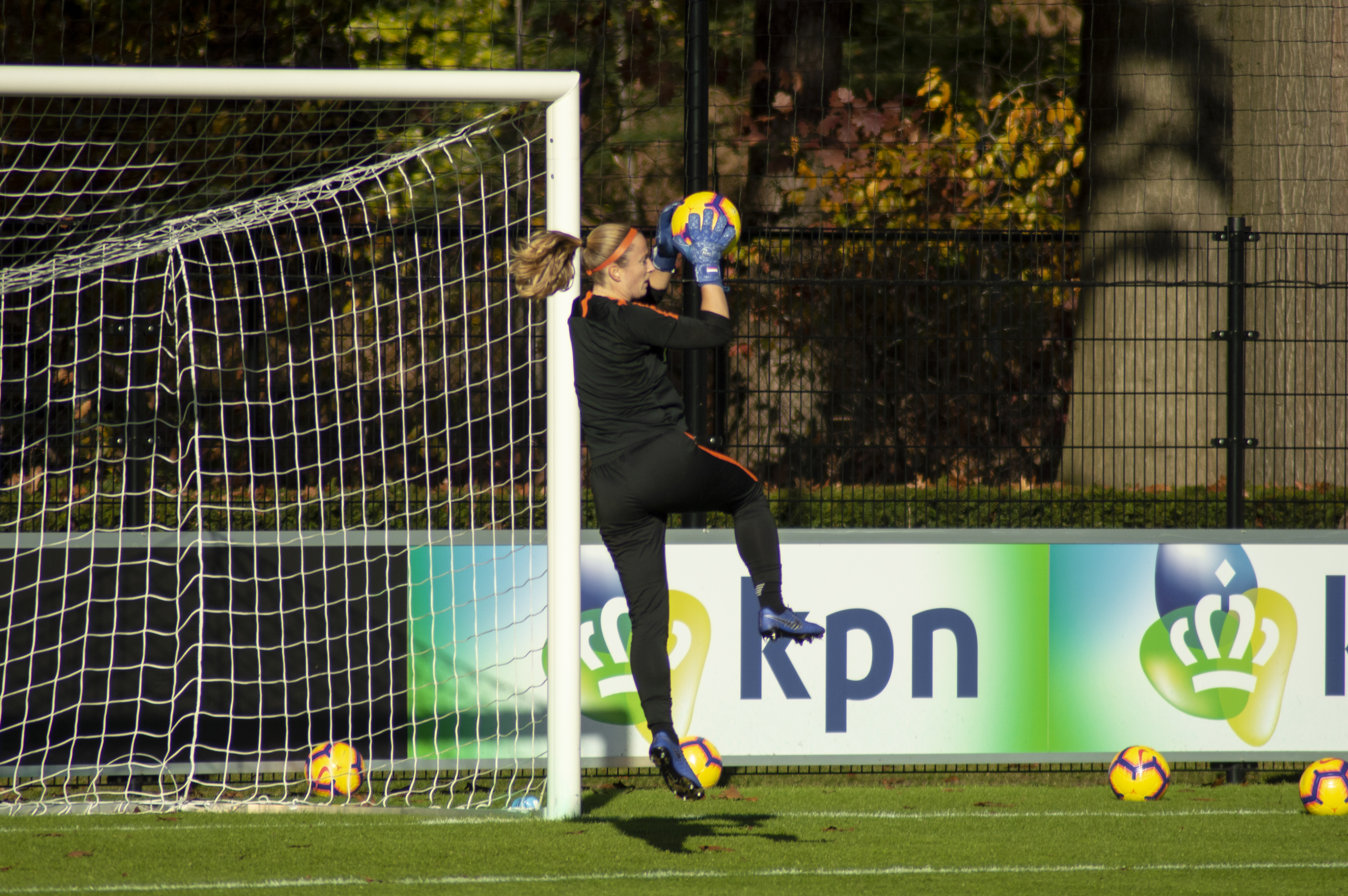
Loes Geurts training with the Netherlands women's national football team on 6 November 2018

On 20 August 2005, at the age of 19, Geurts was given her debut in the senior Netherlands national team by coach Vera Pauw, playing in a 4–0 defeat to Finland in Oulu.

In 2006, Geurts was elevated to first-choice goalkeeper for the Netherlands when Marleen Wissink retired. Geurts played in every match as the Netherlands reached the semi-final of UEFA Women's Euro 2009.

In June 2013, national team coach Roger Reijners selected Geurts in the squad for UEFA Women's Euro 2013 in Sweden. She was also part of the Dutch squads of the 2015 and 2019 World Cup as well as the winning team of the UEFA Women's Euro 2017. After the 2017 tournament, the whole team was honoured by the Prime Minister Mark Rutte and Minister of Sport Edith Schippers and made Knights of the Order of Orange-Nassau.

== Honours ==
AZ Alkmaar

- Eredivisie: 2007–08, 2008–09, 2009–10
- KNVB Women's Cup: 2010–11

Netherlands

- UEFA European Women's Championship: 2017

Individual

- Knight of the Order of Orange-Nassau: 2017
