= Angela Christ =

Dutch footballer

Personal information
- Full name: Angela Anna Christ
- Date of birth: 6 March 1989 (age 37)
- Place of birth: Eindhoven, Netherlands
- Height: 1.67 m (5 ft 6 in)
- Position: Goalkeeper

Youth career
- s.v. Lew

Senior career*
Years	Team	Apps	(Gls)
2002–2004	ODC Boxtel		
2004–2007	Saestum		
2007–2012	Utrecht	91	(0)
2012–2018	PSV/FC Eindhoven	136	(0)

International career
2009–2017	Netherlands	17	(0)
Medal record
Women's football
Representing the Netherlands
UEFA Women's Championship
Gold medal – first place	2017 Netherlands	Team
- * Club domestic league appearances and goals as of 23:00, 25 May 2024 (UTC)

Angela Anna Christ (born 6 March 1989) is a Dutch former footballer who played as a goalkeeper.

== Club career ==
While playing with previous club FC Utrecht she was twice named the Eredivisie's best goalkeeper, in 2010 and 2011. Before Eredivisie's foundation in 2007, she won two Hoofdklasse titles with SV Saestum and had debuted in the top division as a 14-year-old, with ODC Boxtel in 2003–04.

Christ made her final league appearance for Utrecht against PEC Zwolle on 18 May 2012.

In 2012, she joined PSV/FC Eindhoven ahead of the newly created BeNe League. She made her league debut against ADO Den Haag on 24 August 2012.

== International career ==
Christ made her senior Netherlands women's national football team debut on 13 July 2009, a 3–2 win over South Africa in Amsterdam. She was taken to UEFA Women's Euro 2009 in Finland as one of two back-ups to recognised first choice goalkeeper Loes Geurts.

In June 2013 national team coach Roger Reijners selected Christ in the squad for UEFA Women's Euro 2013 in Sweden. She was also part of the Dutch teams of the 2015 FIFA Women's World Cup and the winning team of the UEFA Women's Euro 2017.

After the 2017 tournament, the whole team was honoured by the Prime Minister Mark Rutte and Minister of Sport Edith Schippers and made Knights of the Order of Orange-Nassau.

On 24 November 2017, she played her 17th match for the national team against Slovakia in a 2019 FIFA Women's World Cup qualification match which the Netherlands won by 5–0, a few days later, she announced her retirement from the national team.

== Post-playing career ==
After retiring in 2018, she started doing a weekly internship with PSV Women, taking goalkeeper training sessions.

== Honours ==
=== Club ===
- Dutch Leagues (2): 2005, 2006
- Dutch Cup (1): 2010
- Dutch Supercup (3): 2005, 2006, 2010

=== International ===
- UEFA European Women's Championship (1): 2017

=== Individual ===
- Knight of the Order of Orange-Nassau: 2017
