= 2011–12 Eredivisie (women) =

Sports season

Eredivisie Vrouwen
- Season: 2011–12
- Dates: 2 September 2011 – 18 May 2012
- Champions: ADO Den Haag (1st title)
- UEFA Women's Champions League: ADO Den Haag
- Matches: 63
- Goals: 245 (3.89 per match)
- Top goalscorer: Priscilla de Vos (16)
- Biggest home win: Den Haag 7–0 Utrecht
- Biggest away win: Zwolle 0–8 Den Haag
- Highest scoring: Venlo 3–6 Telstar; Zwolle 4–5 Venlo
- Total attendance: 44,607 (708 per match)

The 2011–12 Eredivisie Vrouwen was the fifth season of the Netherlands women's professional football league. After a troubled build-up, the season took place from 2 September 2011 to 18 May 2012 with seven teams.

Before the start of the season, on 30 August 2011, the BeNe Super Cup was played, a match where the Dutch champion FC Twente met Belgian champion Standard Liège. Twente lost the match 4–1. In the run up to the match, a memorandum was signed by the Dutch and Belgian football associations to create a two-country top-level league, the BeNe League, that could start as soon as the 2012–13 season.

FC Twente entered the season as reigning champions and finished as runners-up, behind ADO Den Haag. It was ADO Den Haag's first championship after finishing runners-up in the previous three seasons. The 63 matches of the season had a 44,607 total attendance.

== Build-up ==
On 22 February 2011, leaders from the Eredivisie, the Royal Dutch Football Association (KNVB) and the clubs met to discuss possible improvement to the league. The KNVB then announced that the league's matchdays would move from Thursdays to Fridays, relationship changes between clubs and their affiliated amateur clubs, guideline principles amongst other topics discussed, and the financial conditions were to be discussed on a further meeting, as the KNVB was trying to keep the league with eight teams. The same day following the meeting, three-time league champions AZ announced its withdraw from the league. The following day, Willem II announced it was also withdrawing from the league. Both clubs claimed financial issues for their decision. PSV Eindhoven, working to build a women's team, confirmed on 3 March 2011 it would not be able to participate in this season.

Two other clubs indicated they would fold, before changing course. On 8 March 2011, FC Utrecht also announced its withdraw due to financial reasons, but on 6 April 2011 reversed its withdraw and confirmed it had secured finances for the season. On 14 April 2011, SC Heerenveen announced its withdraw due to financial issues. Two weeks later, on 26 April 2011, as the club continued working to find sponsors to remain in the league, RBC Roosendaal presented a possibility of entering a team if its male team remained in Jupiler League. The KNVB extension of clubs' registration deadline allowed SC Heerenveen to secure funds needed to play the season and on 28 April 2011 the club confirmed its participation. On 27 May 2011, SC Telstar was confirmed as the seventh team for the season.

== Teams ==
Location of teams in the Eredivisie 2011–12

AZ and Willem II withdrew from the league at the conclusion of the previous season. On 27 May 2011, Telstar announced it would join the league, becoming the seventh team for the season.

Team	City / Town	Venue(s)	Capacity
ADO Den Haag	The Hague	Kyocera Stadion	15,000
ADO Den Haag	The Hague	Sportpark Nieuw Hanenburg	1,500
SC Heerenveen	Heerenveen	Sportpark Skoatterwâld	3,000
SC Heerenveen	Heerenveen	Zuidersportpark (Sneek)	3,150
Telstar	Velsen	TATA Steel Stadion	3,625
Telstar	Velsen	Sportpark De Wending (Heerhugowaard)	1,000
Telstar	Velsen	AFAS Trainingscomplex (Wormerland)	1,000
FC Twente	Enschede	De Grolsch Veste	30,205
FC Twente	Enschede	Sportpark Slangenbeek (Hengelo)	2,000
FC Twente	Enschede	FC Twente-trainingscentrum (Hengelo)	1,000
FC Utrecht	Utrecht	Sportpark Elinkwijk	5,000
FC Utrecht	Utrecht	Sportpark Maarschalkerweerd	1,000
FC Utrecht	Utrecht	Sportcomplex Zoudenbalch	450
FC Utrecht	Utrecht	Sportpark Saestum (Zeist)	
VVV-Venlo	Venlo	Seacon Stadion De Koel	8,000
VVV-Venlo	Venlo	Sportpark VV VOS	
FC Zwolle	Zwolle	FC Zwolle Stadion	10,500
FC Zwolle	Zwolle	Sportpark Ceintuurbaan	3,000

Source: Soccerway

== Format ==
The season was played in a triple round-robin format, where all seven participating teams played each other three times (once at home, once away, and the third match defined by a lottery-system at the second half the season), a total of 18 matches each. The champion qualified to the UEFA Women's Champions League. There was no relegation system in place.

== Standings ==
Pos	Team	Pld	W	D	L	GF	GA	GD	Pts	Qualification
1	ADO Den Haag (C, Q)	18	15	2	1	60	18	+42	47	2012–13 UEFA Women's Champions League
2	Twente	18	10	3	5	31	22	+9	33	
3	Telstar	18	8	3	7	39	42	−3	27	
4	Utrecht	18	6	3	9	25	30	−5	21	
5	VVV-Venlo	18	6	2	10	34	47	−13	20	
6	PEC Zwolle	18	4	4	10	31	48	−17	16	
7	Heerenveen	18	4	3	11	25	38	−13	15	

Source: Soccerway
Rules for classification: 1) Points; 2) Goal difference; 3) Number of goals scored
(C) Champions; (Q) Qualified for the phase indicated

== Results ==
First and second round

Home \ Away	ADO	HEE	TEL	TWE	UTR	VVV	ZWO
ADO Den Haag		1–1	2–2	3–1	7–0	5–1	3–1
Heerenveen	1–4		1–2	1–1	0–1	1–2	4–3
Telstar	1–4	3–2		2–1	1–0	5–0	1–4
Twente	2–0	2–1	2–1		1–0	2–0	4–0
Utrecht	1–3	0–1	5–1	0–2		3–1	1–1
VVV-Venlo	1–2	2–3	3–6	1–2	1–4		2–1
PEC Zwolle	0–8	0–2	2–0	0–2	1–1	4–5	

Source: Soccerway
Legend: Blue = home team win; Yellow = draw; Red = away team win.

Third round

Home \ Away	ADO	HEE	TEL	TWE	UTR	VVV	ZWO
ADO Den Haag			4–2	4–3	4–0		
Heerenveen	0–2					1–3	3–4
Telstar		4–2				3–3	3–3
Twente		0–0	4–1		0–3		
Utrecht		4–1	0–1			1–3	
VVV-Venlo	0–2			1–1			5–1
PEC Zwolle	1–2			4–1	1–1		

Source: Soccerway
Legend: Blue = home team win; Yellow = draw; Red = away team win.

== Top scorers ==
Pos.	Player	Club	Goals
1	(Netherlands) Priscilla de Vos	Telstar	16
2	(Netherlands) Renate Jansen	ADO Den Haag	10
2	(Netherlands) Vivianne Miedema	Heerenveen	10
2	(Netherlands) Tessel Middag	ADO Den Haag	10
2	(Netherlands) Jill Wilmot	ADO Den Haag	10
6	(Netherlands) Lisanne Grimberg	ADO Den Haag	9
6	(Netherlands) Marianne Van Brummelen	FC Zwolle	9
8	(Netherlands) Danielle van de Donk	VVV-Venlo	8
8	(Netherlands) Lisanne Vermeulen	FC Zwolle	8
10	(Netherlands) Sylvia Smit	Heerenveen	7
11	6 players		6
17	5 players		5
22	5 players		4
27	7 players		3
34	8 players		2
42	28 players		1
Own goals			2
Total:			245
Games:			63
Average:			3.89

Source: VrouwenvoetbalNederland.nl, Soccerway

== See also ==
- 2011–12 Eredivisie - men's league
