= Daniëlle van de Donk =

Dutch footballer (born 1991)

- Van de Donk in 2026

Personal information
- Full name: Daniëlle van de Donk
- Date of birth: 5 August 1991 (age 35)
- Place of birth: Valkenswaard, Netherlands
- Height: 1.60 m (5 ft 3 in)
- Position: Midfielder

Team information
- Current team: London City Lionesses
- Number: 10

Youth career
- 1995–2006: SV Valkenswaard
- 2006–2008: UNA

Senior career*
Years	Team	Apps	(Gls)
2008–2011	Willem II	47	(5)
2011–2012	VVV-Venlo	18	(8)
2012–2015	PSV/FC Eindhoven	66	(36)
2015	Kopparbergs/Göteborg	13	(4)
2015–2021	Arsenal	96	(28)
2021–2025	Lyon	63	(14)
2025–	London City Lionesses	7	(2)

International career^{‡}
2006	Netherlands U15	1	(0)
2007–2008	Netherlands U17	7	(0)
2008–2009	Netherlands U19	6	(1)
2010–	Netherlands	176	(38)
Medal record
Women's football
Representing the Netherlands
FIFA Women's World Cup
Runner-up	2019 France
UEFA Women's Championship
Winner	2017 Netherlands
- * Club domestic league appearances and goals as of 4 September 2026 ‡ National team caps and goals as of 13 October 2026

Daniëlle van de Donk (Dutch pronunciation: [daːniˈjɛlə vɑn də ˈdɔŋk]; born 5 August 1991) is a Dutch professional footballer who plays as a midfielder for Women's Super League club London City Lionesses and the Netherlands national team. She helped her national team to win the UEFA Euro 2017 and finish second at the 2019 FIFA World Cup.

== Early life ==
Born in Valkenswaard, Netherlands, Van de Donk grew up playing football with boys. Her uncle noted, "If she started training at FC Eindhoven, she was laughed at by the boys. When she had played 3 balls, they were all silent." She started playing for SV Valkenswaard in her home town at the age of 4 and later moved to VV UNA.

== Club career ==
=== Willem II ===
==== 2008–2011 ====
At age 17, Van de Donk first played as a professional footballer for Dutch Eredivisie club, Willem II. She featured for the Tricolores for the next four seasons, playing in 47 competitive league matches and scoring five goals. During her first season in 2008, she played eighteen of the 24 matches and scored one goal. In her second season, she suffered an anterior cruciate ligament (ACL) injury, which kept her off the field for several months. She made seven appearances for Willem II during the 2009–10 season and the club finished in third place with a 8–10–2 record. During the 2010–11 season, she scored four goals in 21 matches playing as a starting midfielder.

=== VVV-Venlo ===
==== 2011–12 Season ====
Van de Donk signed with VVV-Venlo ahead of the 2011–12 season. She played 18 regular season games, scoring 8 goals as a starter for the club. During a match against Heerenveen, Van de Donk scored a brace lifting her team to a 2–1 win. During a match against PEC Zwolle, she scored the game-winning goal in the 83rd minute to lift VVV to a 5–4 win. During another match against Heerenveen, Van de Donk scored a second brace helping VVV win 3–1. VVV finished in fifth place with a 6–10–2 record. She also helped VVV reach the final of the KNVB Women's Cup in 2012.

=== PSV/FC Eindhoven ===
==== 2012–2015 ====
Van de Donk then left Venlo for PSV/FC Eindhoven ahead of Eindhoven's participation in the inaugural season of the Dutch & Belgian BeNe League. With Eindhoven, Van de Donk reached the final of the KNVB Cup of 2014, where she eventually earned a runners-up medal. She racked up an outstanding 30 goals in 53 appearances for the club.

=== Kopparbergs/Göteborg ===
==== 2015 Loan ====
In June 2015, Van de Donk was transferred to Swedish Damallsvenskan club Kopparbergs/Göteborg FC. Van de Donk made 13 appearances for the club, scoring 4 goals. During a match on 11 October, Van de Donk scored a brace —the team's only goals — in a 4–2 loss to KIF Örebro. Göteborg finished the 2016 season in sixth place with a 9–8–5 record.

=== Arsenal ===
==== 2015–2021 ====
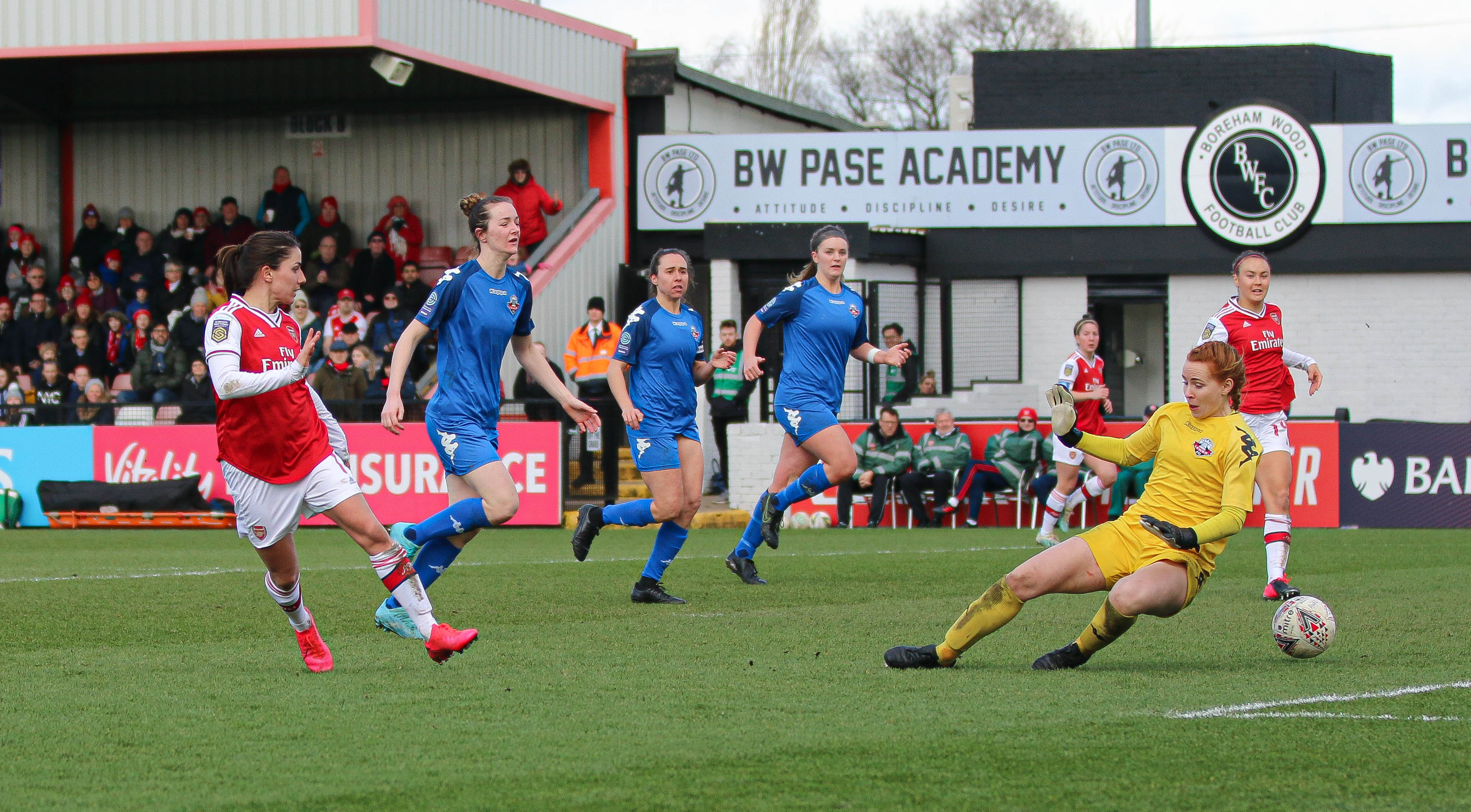
Van de Donk (far left) during an Arsenal match, 2020

On 20 November 2015, Van de Donk signed with English club Arsenal of the FA Women's Super League (FA WSL). The move proved successful with her starting in the 2016 FA Cup final on 14 May 2016. Arsenal were eventually crowned champions, beating Chelsea 1–0 at the Wembley Stadium to earn their fourteenth FA Cup title.

On 7 October 2016, Van de Donk signed a new contract with Arsenal and was a starting midfielder in 14 of the 15 games she played. Van de Donk scored three goals helping lift Arsenal to a third-place finish with a 10–4–2 record. During the FA WSL Spring Series, she scored two goals in eight matches.

During the 2017–18 season, Van de Donk scored five goals in 18 matches. She scored a brace in the match against Bristol City on 20 May lifting Arsenal to a 6–1 win with the first and last goals of the match. Arsenal finished in third place with a 11–3–4 record.

Van de Donk was instrumental in Arsenal's 2018–19 WSL championship season. She scored 23 combined goals and assists in all competitions. Sports Illustrated described her as "crucial to Arsenal's efforts in trying to recapture a first Women's Super League title since 2012." On 17 November, her double nutmeg went viral on Twitter. Arsenal finished in third place with a 5–0–3 record.

Marking her fifth year with the club, Van de Donk signed a new long-term contract with Arsenal in March 2019. Of the signing, Arsenal manager Joe Montemurro said, "She brings a world class attitude and quality that are vital to our team." During the 2019–20 season, she scored five goals in 15 matches. The FA suspended the season because of the COVID-19 pandemic, deciding the competition based on points per game. Arsenal finished in third place with a 12–3–0 record and played in the 2019–20 FA WSL Cup, where they eventually lost 2–1 to Chelsea during the 2020 FA Women's League Cup Final.

In October 2020, she was named WSL Player of the Week after her performance in a 5–0 win against Brighton & Hove Albion. Van de Donk scored Arsenal's second goal and had over 60 touches on the ball.

=== Lyon ===
==== 2021–2025 ====
In June 2021, Lyon announced they had signed Van de Donk to a two-year contract. On 5 September 2021, she made her league debut for Lyon against Saint-Étienne. Home against VfL Wolfsburg in the 2024–25 Champions League, Van de Donk scored in the 81st minute, making the final score 1–0.

=== London City Lionesses ===
==== 2025 ====
On 20 June 2025, the London City Lionesses announced Van de Donk joining the club on free transfer from Lyon. London City Lionesses had been competing in the England's second-highest tier competition, Women's Championship, and having won the competition in 2024–25, they were promoted to the top tier, the Women's Super League. The club became the first independent women's team (not affiliated with a men's team) to compete in WSL. It is owned by Michele Kang, the same owner of Lyon, who had projected to recruit high-profile players. Van de Donk became the first signing after the club's promotion to WSL.

On 4 September 2026, she made a superb flick into goal, sealing the win for LCL against Manchester United in the opening match of the season.

== International career ==
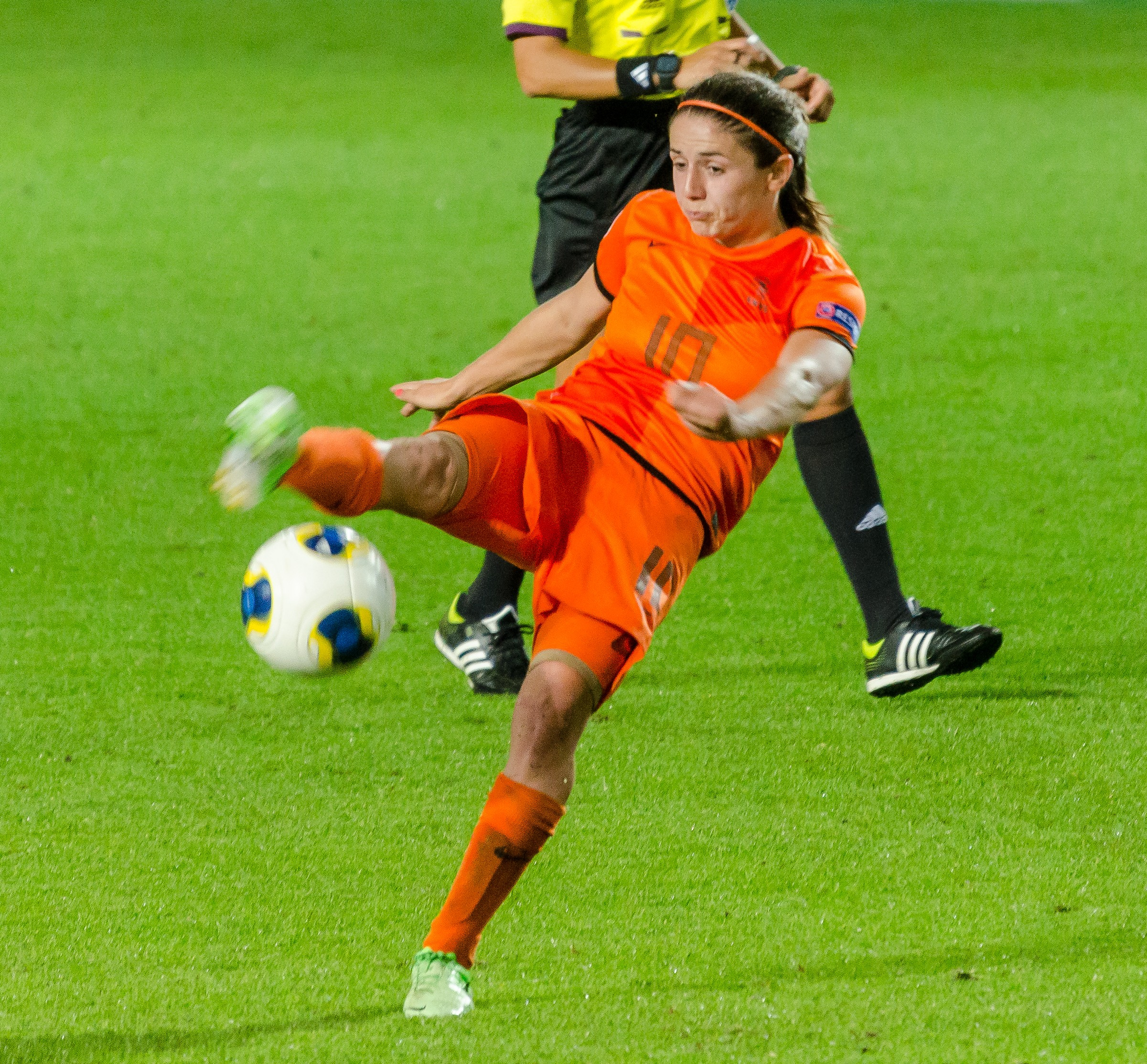
Van de Donk playing for the Netherlands at the 2013 Euros

At the age of 19, Van de Donk made her debut for the Netherlands national team in a match against Mexico on 15 December 2010 at the 2010 City of São Paulo Tournament. She scored her first official international goal in the 2013 European Championship qualifiers against Serbia.

In June 2013, Dutch national team coach Roger Reijners selected Van de Donk for the Netherlands squad for UEFA Euro 2013 in Sweden. The Netherlands squad lost all three of their group stage matches and did not advance at the tournament.

Van de Donk competed at the 2015 FIFA World Cup in Canada under the direction of Reijners. After finishing third in Group A and placing second in the ranking of third place teams, the Netherlands advanced to the knockout round where they faced 2011 champions, Japan and lost 2–1.

On 14 June 2017, Van de Donk was selected as part of the Dutch squad for UEFA Euro 2017 on home soil. She went on to play an integral part in the tournament. In the semi-finals, she scored against England in a 3–0 win for the Dutch. Van de Donk also played in the final against Denmark, where her creative presence helped the Netherlands come away with a victory. After the tournament, the team was honoured by the Prime Minister Mark Rutte and Minister of Sport Edith Schippers and made Knights of the Order of Orange-Nassau.

Van de Donk was selected to the final squad for the 2019 FIFA World Cup in France. Ahead of the tournament, ESPN named her to their top 25 player ranking. After winning all three of their group stage matches, the team finished at the top of their group and advanced to the knockout stage. During the Round of 16, the Dutch team faced 2011 champions, Japan, who had knocked them out of the 2015 World Cup. This time, the Netherlands won 2–1 and advanced to the quarterfinals. Of the match, The Guardian called Van de Donk "Holland's best player tonight." The Dutch team faced Italy in the quarterfinal and won 2–1 advancing to the semifinal for the first time in team history. Van de Donk played every minute of the semi-final against Sweden until the team scored a goal in the ninth minute of extra time and won the match 1–0, advancing to the final for the first time. The Netherlands faced 2015 champions the United States and lost 2–0. She also played in the Final. Following the loss, she noted: "The growth [of women’s football in the Netherlands] is ridiculous. If I look at women’s football and the hype, it’s amazing. I think that’s what I’m most proud of, that we got so much respect from the Netherlands."

On 8 October 2019, Van de Donk scored a goal in her 100th international appearance, a 2–0 win against Russia.

In the Euro 2022, Van de Donk scored the winning goal in the 3–2 match against Portugal, helping her team advance to the knockout stage.

On 31 May 2023, she was named as part of the Netherlands provisional squad for the 2023 FIFA World Cup. In the group stage game against the United States, Van de Donk hit her head and received treatment for several minutes. She returned to play wearing a swim cap to prevent bleeding.

== Personal life ==
Van de Donk was in a relationship with former Arsenal teammate Beth Mead. After joining Lyon, she met Ellie Carpenter, a teammate and Australia national team defender. The two announced their engagement on 1 January 2024 during a holiday in the Maldives, and marriage on 7 June 2025 at the Château Hermitage de Combas in Servian in Southern France.

== Career statistics ==
Scores and results list the Netherlands' goal tally first, score column indicates score after each van de Donk goal.

List of international goals scored by Daniëlle van de Donk
No.	Date	Venue	Opponent	Score	Result	Competition
1	22 August 2011	Hohhot City Stadium, Hohhot, China	China	1–0	1–1	Friendly
2	20 June 2012	Stadion Srem Jakovo, Jakovo, Serbia	Serbia	4–0	4–0	UEFA Women's Euro 2013 qualifying
3	6 March 2013	GSZ Stadium, Larnaca, Cyprus	Finland	1–1	1–1	2013 Cyprus Women's Cup
4	17 September 2014	Nadderud Stadion, Bekkestua, Norway	Norway	2–0	2–0	2015 FIFA Women's World Cup qualification
5	20 May 2015	Sparta Stadion, Rotterdam, Netherlands	Estonia	2–0	7–0	Friendly
6	20 May 2015	Sparta Stadion, Rotterdam, Netherlands	Estonia	4–0	7–0	Friendly
7	17 September 2015	De Vijverberg, Doetinchem, Netherlands	Belarus	3–0	8–0	Friendly
8	23 October 2015	Stade Jean-Bouin, Paris, France	France	1–0	2–1	Friendly
9	25 January 2016	Spice Hotel, Belek, Turkey	Denmark	2–1	2–1	Friendly
10	8 July 2017	Sparta Stadion, Rotterdam, Netherlands	Wales	2–0	5–0	Friendly
11	3 August 2017	De Grolsch Veste, Enschede, Netherlands	England	2–0	3–0	UEFA Women's Euro 2017
12	8 June 2018	Shamrock Park, Portadown, Northern Ireland	Northern Ireland	2–0	5–0	2019 FIFA Women's World Cup qualification
13	9 April 2019	AFAS Stadion, Alkmaar, Netherlands	Chile	1–0	7–0	Friendly
14	9 April 2019	AFAS Stadion, Alkmaar, Netherlands	Chile	3–0	7–0	Friendly
15	9 April 2019	AFAS Stadion, Alkmaar, Netherlands	Chile	4–0	7–0	Friendly
16	9 April 2019	AFAS Stadion, Alkmaar, Netherlands	Chile	7–0	7–0	Friendly
17	3 September 2019	Abe Lenstra Stadion, Heerenveen, Netherlands	Turkey	2–0	3–0	UEFA Women's Euro 2022 qualifying
18	8 October 2019	Philips Stadion, Eindhoven, Netherlands	Russia	1–0	2–0	UEFA Women's Euro 2022 qualifying
19	8 November 2019	Bornova Stadium, İzmir, Turkey	Turkey	4–0	8–0	UEFA Women's Euro 2022 qualifying
20	8 November 2019	Bornova Stadium, İzmir, Turkey	Turkey	6–0	8–0	UEFA Women's Euro 2022 qualifying
21	8 November 2019	Bornova Stadium, İzmir, Turkey	Turkey	7–0	8–0	UEFA Women's Euro 2022 qualifying
22	23 October 2020	Euroborg, Groningen, Netherlands	Estonia	1–0	7–0	UEFA Women's Euro 2022 qualifying
23	23 October 2020	Euroborg, Groningen, Netherlands	Estonia	2–0	7–0	UEFA Women's Euro 2022 qualifying
24	27 October 2020	Stadiumi Fadil Vokrri, Pristina, Kosovo	Kosovo	1–0	6–0	UEFA Women's Euro 2022 qualifying
25	18 February 2021	King Baudouin Stadium, Brussels, Belgium	Belgium	5–1	6–1	Friendly
26	24 February 2021	De Koel, Venlo, Netherlands	Germany	2–1	2–1	Friendly
27	13 April 2021	De Goffert, Nijmegen, Netherlands	Australia	5–0	5–0	Friendly
28	15 June 2021	De Grolsch Veste, Enschede, Netherlands	Norway	7–0	7–0	Friendly
29	21 September 2021	Laugardalsvöllur, Reykjavík, Iceland	Iceland	1–0	2–0	2023 FIFA Women's World Cup qualification
30	22 October 2021	AEK Arena, Larnaca, Cyprus	Cyprus	2–0	8–0	2023 FIFA Women's World Cup qualification
31	26 October 2021	Stadyen Dynama, Minsk, Belarus	Belarus	2–0	2–0	2023 FIFA Women's World Cup qualification
32	27 November 2021	Mestsky Stadion, Ostrava, Czech Republic	Czech Republic	1–1	2–2	2023 FIFA Women's World Cup qualification
33	13 July 2022	Leigh Sports Village, Leigh, England	Portugal	3–2	3–2	UEFA Women's Euro 2022
34	11 November 2022	Stadion Galgenwaard, Utrecht, Netherlands	Costa Rica	1–0	4–0	Friendly
35	1 August 2023	Forsyth Barr Stadium, Dunedin, New Zealand	Vietnam	5–0	7–0	2023 FIFA Women's World Cup
36	27 October 2023	Goffertstadion, Nijmegen, Netherlands	Scotland	1–0	4–0	2023–24 UEFA Women's Nations League

* Note: Match not considered as an official friendly.

== Honours ==
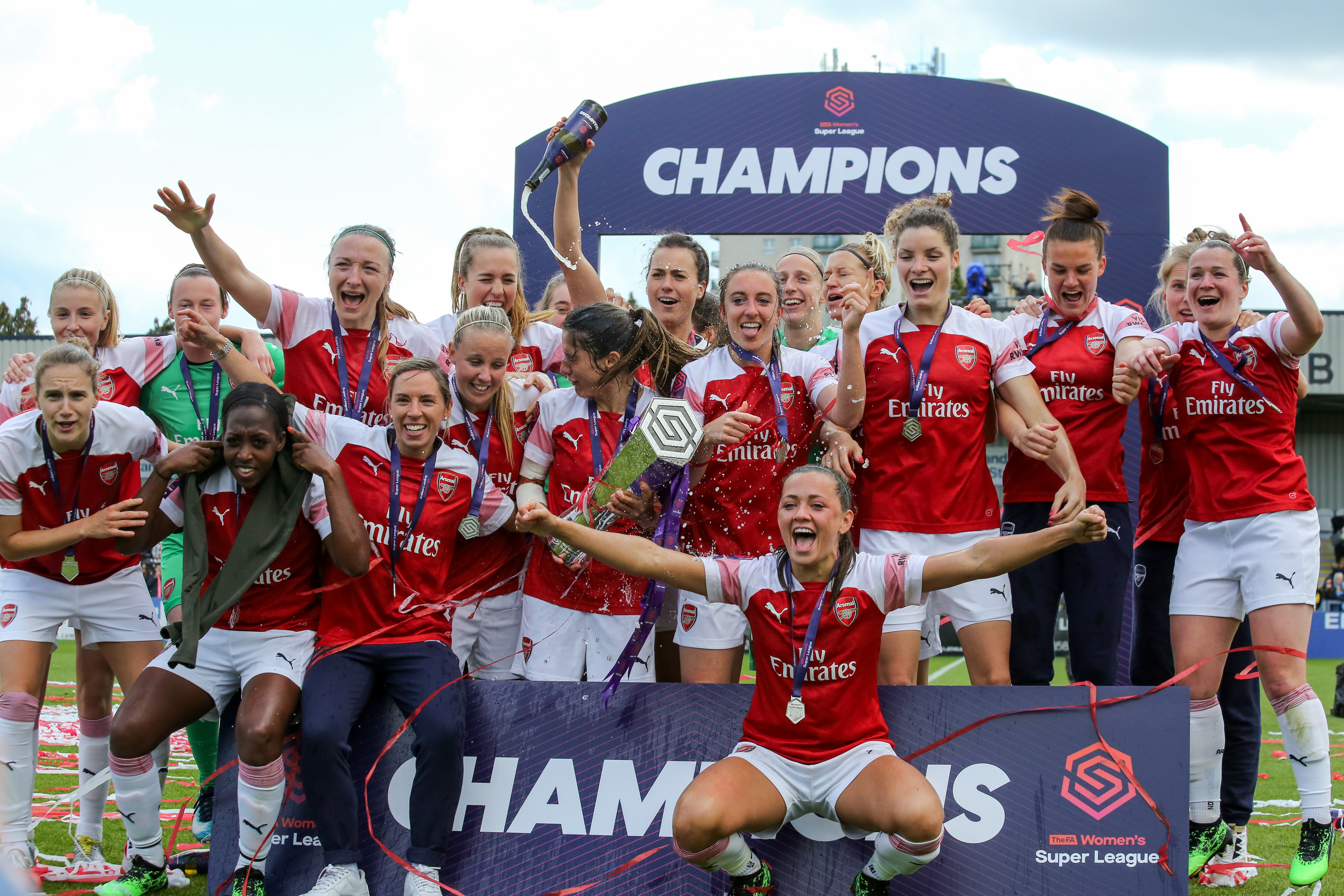
Van de Donk (holding the trophy) celebrating the league title

VVV-Venlo

- KNVB Women's Cup: runner-up 2012

PSV/FC Eindhoven

- KNVB Women's Cup: runner-up 2014

Arsenal

- FA Women's Cup: 2015–16
- FA WSL Cup: 2017–18
- FA WSL: 2018–19

Olympique Lyonnais

- Division 1 Féminine: 2021–22, 2022–23, 2023–24
- Première Ligue (new name of Division 1 since 2024): 2024–25
- Coupe de France: 2022–23
- Trophée des Championnes: 2022, 2023
- UEFA Champions League: 2021–22

Netherlands

- UEFA European Women's Championship: 2017
- FIFA Women's World Cup: runner-up 2019
- Algarve Cup: 2018
- Tournoi de France: runner-up 2020

Individual

- Knight of the Order of Orange-Nassau: 2017
- WSL Player of the Month: November 2018

== See also ==
- List of women's footballers with 100 or more international caps
- List of FA WSL hat-tricks
- List of foreign FA Women's Super League players
- List of foreign Damallsvenskan players
- List of LGBT sportspeople
- List of UEFA Women's Championship goalscorers
