= Claudia van den Heiligenberg =

Dutch footballer (born 1985)

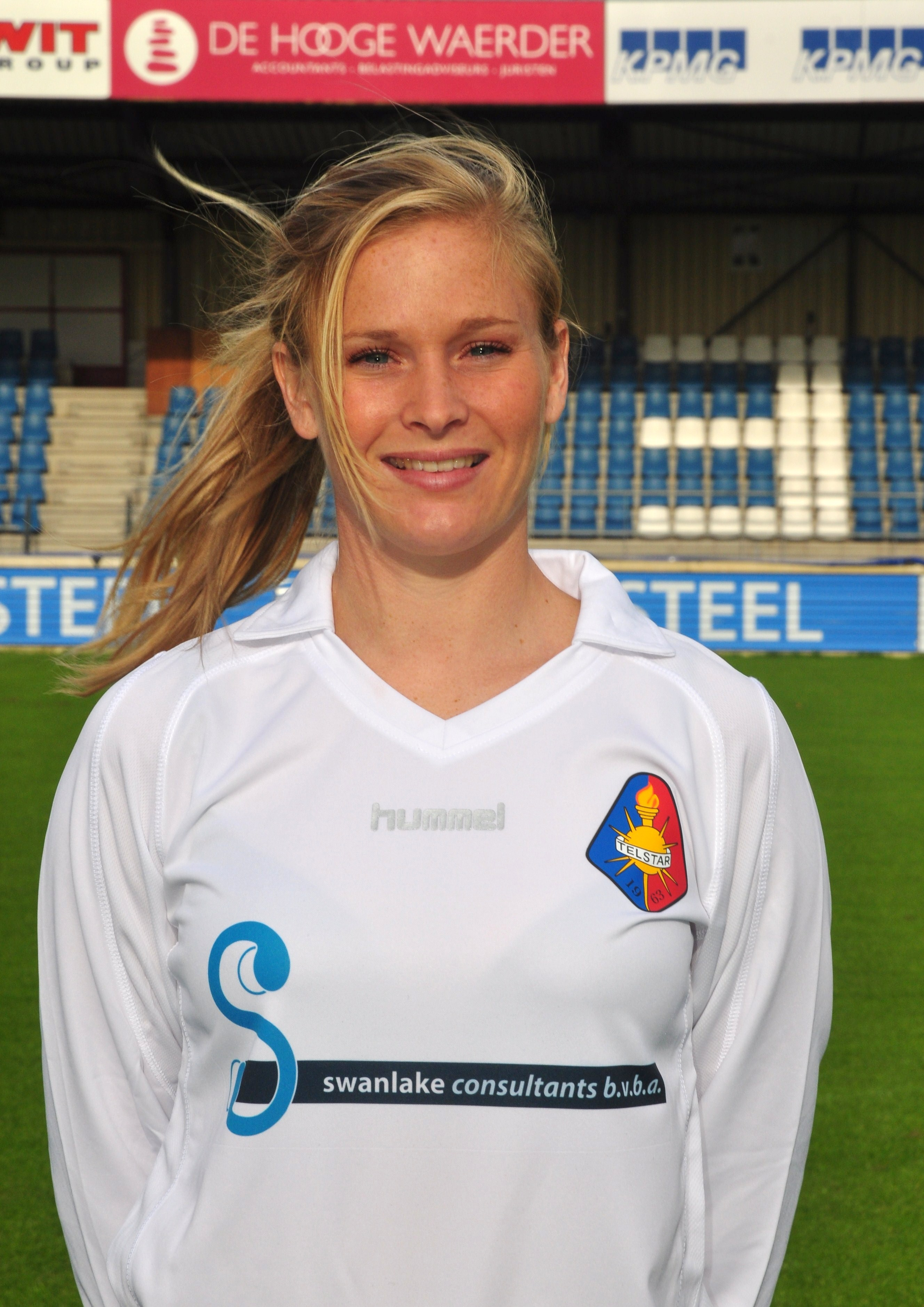
- Van den Heiligenbergwith Telstar in 2011

Personal information
- Full name: Claudia Voňková
- Birth name: Anna Gerarda Maria van den Heiligenberg
- Date of birth: 25 March 1985 (age 41)
- Place of birth: Roelofarendsveen, Netherlands
- Height: 1.70 m (5 ft 7 in)
- Positions: Left-back; left winger

Youth career
- 2002–2003: SV Alkmania

Senior career*
Years	Team	Apps	(Gls)
2003–2005	RCL Leiderdorp		
2005–2007	Ter Leede		(16)
2007–2011	AZ	84	(34)
2011–2013	Telstar	44	(12)
2013–2015	Ajax	48	(13)
2015–2017	Jena	36	(1)
2017–2019	Bayern Munich II	19	(6)

International career
2005–2016	Netherlands	97	(8)
- * Club domestic league appearances and goals

Claudia Voňková, née Anna Gerarda Maria "Claudia" van den Heiligenberg (born 25 March 1985) is a Dutch former footballer who played as a left back or left winger. She played for the Netherlands national team between 2005 and 2016 and won national league and cup titles in the Netherlands.

== Club career ==
Born in Roelofarendsveen, she started playing when she was six years old at the boys youth team of SV Alkmania in Oude Wetering. After being scouted by the Royal Dutch Football Association, she moved to Racing Club in Leiderdorp (RCL) and played in the Eerste Klasse, the second division at that time. She was the top scorer of the 2003–04 Eerste Klasse. She then moved to Hoofdklasse (first division) club Ter Leede and won the league (Hoofdklasse) title, Dutch Cup, and the Dutch Super Cup in 2006–07.

When the Dutch women's professional league, the Eredivisie, was established in 2007, she moved to AZ, winning the Eredivisie in three consecutive seasons (2007–08, 2008–09 and 2009–10) and the Dutch Cup in 2010–11. With AZ, she also played seven UEFA Women's Champions League matches, scoring twice. The club folded at the end of the 2010–11 season, and, like most of its players, she moved to the newly formed SC Telstar. She played two seasons at Telstar, the first in the Eredivisie and the second in the newly created BeNe League.

In 2013, she joined Ajax, with whomshe won her third Dutch Cup in 2013–14.

In 2015, she moved to the German Bundesliga club USV Jena and played two season at the club before moving to Bayern Munich II of the 2. Bundesliga in 2017.

== International career ==
At age 19, while with Racing Club Leiderdorp, van den Heiligenberg became part of the Netherlands national team. She made her debut under coach Vera Pauw on 7 September 2005 in a home friendly 2–0 defeat against Italy in Zwolle.

Selected by Pauw to be in the national squad for the UEFA Women's Euro 2009, she played in two of the five Dutch matches in the tournament, helping the team reach the semifinals.

In December 2009, Pauw dropped van den Heiligenberg and Dyanne Bito from the squad ahead of a match against Belarus. The decision proved controversial, and it was reported that the duo were kicked out because they were in a relationship. Pauw angrily dismissed the claims, saying it was an insult to suggest they were excluded because of their relationship.

Van den Heiligenberg and Bito remained together and both were restored to the national team by incoming national coach Roger Reijners in 2010. A 2–0 win over Ireland in August 2010 was Van den Heiligenberg's 50th international cap. She was selected in the Netherlands squad for UEFA Women's Euro 2013 in Sweden.

A knee injury ruled out her chances of selection for the 2015 FIFA Women's World Cup. During the following seasons, other injuries kept her out of contention for national team selections, she played one match, on 25 January 2016 against Denmark, her 97th cap and eventually her last. On 6 July 2017, she announced her international retirement. She scored eight goals for the national team.

== Personal life ==
van den Heiligenberg's mother Mary van der Meer was also a Dutch international footballer who played four matches in the 1970s.

During her time at Telstar, van den Heiligenberg also worked for the Dutch police force. In September 2018, she married her partner, Lucie Voňková. In March 2021, Lucie announced on social media that van den Heiligenberg was pregnant.

== Career statistics ==
Scores and results list the Netherlands' goal tally first, score column indicates score after each van den Heiligenberg goal.

List of international goals scored by Claudia van den Heiligenberg
No.	Date	Venue	Opponent	Score	Result	Competition
1	12 October 2005	Oosterenkstadion, Zwolle, Netherlands	Switzerland	2–0	6–0	Friendly
2	12 October 2005	Oosterenkstadion, Zwolle, Netherlands	Switzerland	3–0	6–0	Friendly
3	12 April 2006	Oosterenkstadion, Zwolle, Netherlands	Iceland	1–0	2–1	Friendly
4	12 April 2006	Oosterenkstadion, Zwolle, Netherlands	Iceland	2–1	2–1	Friendly
5	6 June 2010	Sportpark De Dorens, Loenhout, Belgium	Belgium	1–0	2–0	Friendly
6	15 December 2010	Estádio do Pacaembu, São Paulo, Brazil	Mexico	2–1	3–1	2010 Torneio Internacional
7	9 March 2011	Paralimni Stadium, Paralimni, Cyprus	Canada	1–1	1–2	2011 Cyprus Cup
8	10 April 2014	Stadion De Braak, Helmond, Netherlands	Albania	1–0	10–1	2015 FIFA Women's World Cup qualification

== Honours ==
Ter Leerde

- Hoofdklasse: 2006–07
- KNVB Cup: 2006–07
- Dutch Super Cup: 2006–07

AZ Alkmaar

- Eredivisie: 2007–08, 2008–09, 2009–10
- KNVB Cup: 2010–11

Ajax

- KNVB Cup: 2013–14
