= FC Utrecht (women) =

Dutch women's football club

Coordinates: 52°7′13.5″N 5°3′59.9″E

- Full name: Football Club Utrecht
- Founded: 2007
- Ground: Sportcomplex Zoudenbalch; Stadion Galgenwaard
- Capacity: 1,000 (of which 450 seats); 23,750
- Chairman: Steef Klop
- Head coach: Sylvia Smit
- League: Eredivisie Vrouwen (2007–2012, 2023–present); BeNe League (2012–2014)
- 2025–26: 5th
- Website: fcutrecht.nl/fcutrechtvrouwen
Home colours	Away colours	Third colours

FC Utrecht Vrouwen is a Dutch women's football club based in Utrecht. Established in 2007, as one of the founding members of the professional Eredivisie. The team competed in the Eredivisie from its inaugural season of 2007–08 until 2011–12 and then in the BeNe League, made of up Belgian and Dutch teams, from 2012–13 until the team's dissolution in January 2014. Before its dissolution, the club won the Dutch Cup once and the Dutch Women's Super Cup once.
The club rejoined the Eredivisie beginning in the 2023–24 season.

== History ==
On 20 March 2007, the Royal Dutch Football Association (KNVB) announced the professional Dutch women's football league (Eredivisie Vrouwen) for three seasons starting in 2007–08, and FC Utrecht was one of the original six participating clubs.

The club played its first official match on 30 August 2007, a 0–2 home defeat to AZ at the Sportcomplex Zoudenbalch. The team had a good season, finishing third in the league and runners-up in the KNVB Women's Cup (Dutch Cup), losing the final 3–0 to FC Twente.

A fourth-place finish in the league's 2008–09 season was followed by a fifth place in the next season (2009–10). In that same season the club won the Dutch Cup, on 15 May 2010 by beating Ter Leede 3–0 in the final, and won the KNVB Women's Super Cup on 27 August 2010, defeating Eredivisie champion AZ 3–1, after extra time.

On 22 February 2011, the League, the KNVB and the clubs met to discuss improving to the league. The KNVB announced that the following season, matchdays would move from Thursdays to Fridays, relationship changes between clubs and their affiliated amateur clubs, guideline principles amongst other topics discussed and the financial conditions were to be discussed on a further meeting, as the KNVB was trying to keep the league with eight teams. On 8 March 2011, FC Utrecht became the third team (after AZ and Willem II) to announce its withdrawal from the league for the next season due to financial reasons. To keep going without the club financial support, the Stichting Vrouwenvoetbal Utrecht (SVVU) (English: Utrecht Women's Football Foundation) was created on 6 April 2011, to provide the necessary finances and use FC Utrecht women's football license to register a team in the league. At the end of the 2010–11 season, the club finished fifth in the league. On 3 May 2011, the SEV and KNVB confirmed FC Utrecht as one of the six participants of the Eredivisie 2011–12 season, where the team finished fourth.

In 2012, the professional women's leagues of Belgium and the Netherlands merged, creating the 16-team BeNe League. FC Utrecht was one of the eight Dutch teams who participated of its inaugural 2012–13 season. The team finished in 12th place.

In June 2013, despite financial concerns, the team applied for a license to play the 2013–14 BeNe League season. By the end of October, the Utrecht Women's Football Foundation (SVVU) which ran the club, could no longer meet its financial obligations and started to analyse the possibilities of continuing, even on an amateur basis.

On 10 January 2014, the SVVU filed for bankruptcy at the district court of Utrecht. On 21 January, the court ruled SVVU as bankrupt, providing an eight-day period to appeal the court's decision. During this period, the team had to meet its competition obligations, including an away match against Club Brugge on 24 January. FC Utrecht won the match 2–1, in what was the team's last official match for almost a decade. After the appeal period expired, the SVVU was legally dissolved on 30 January, having played 16 matches and in 11th place in the standings. The team was removed from the BeNe League and had all its 2013–14 season (BeNe League and Dutch Cup) results revoked and fixtures cancelled.

In July 2021, FC Utrecht was reportedly looking into restarting a women's team in the Eredivisie Vrouwen beginning in the 2023–24 season. The club played its first match after rejoining the Eredivisie on 10 September 2023. The team Feyenoord 4–2 in front of 14,631 spectators, the second-highest attendance in the league that season. The team's other home match at Stadion Galgenwaard, a 2–0 loss to AFC Ajax, had the fourth-best attendance. It finished the season in seventh place.

== Affiliated clubs ==
Professional women's football clubs in the Netherlands are required by the Royal Dutch Football Association to affiliate an amateur club who would use players coming back from injury or reserve players or young talented players from the professional club. FC Utrecht chose SV Saestum as its associated club.

== Competitive record ==
3	4	5	5	4	12	WDR
08	09	10	11	12	13	14
Women's eredivisie BeNe League

Season	Division	Position	W – D – L = Pts	GF – GA	Top scorer	KNVB Beker
2007–08	Eredivisie	3 / 6	10 – 2 – 8 = 32	35 – 29	Smith (8)	Finalist
2008–09	Eredivisie	4 / 7	11 – 4 – 9 = 37	34 – 31	Vermeulen (9)	
2009–10	Eredivisie	5 / 6	5 – 3 – 12 = 18	17 – 25	van den Boogaard (4)	Champions
2010–11	Eredivisie	5 / 8	7 – 9 – 5 = 30	30 – 29	Vugts (10)	Quarterfinals
2011–12	Eredivisie	4 / 7	6 – 3 – 9 = 21	25 – 30	van den Boogaard (6)	Semifinals
2012–13	BeNe League	12 / 16	9 – 4 – 15 = 31	48 – 55	Oudejans (14)	Quarterfinals
2013–14*	BeNe League	11 / 15	5 – 3 – 8 = 18	24 – 30	Becx (5)	Round of 16
2023–24	Eredivisie	7 / 12	8 – 6 – 8 = 22	34 – 45	Bakker (10)	Quarterfinals

* Note: Withdrew due to bankruptcy before the conclusion of the season in January 2014, all results and fixtures were cancelled.

== Honours ==
- KNVB Women's Cup
  - Winners (1): 2010
- Dutch Women's Super Cup
  - Winners (1): 2010

== Players ==
=== Current squad ===
As of 5 October 2026

Note: Flags indicate national team as defined under FIFA eligibility rules; some limited exceptions apply. Players may hold more than one non-FIFA nationality.

No.	Pos.	Nation	Player
1	GK	BEL	Femke Bastiaen
2	DF	NED	Felice Hermans
3	MF	NED	Merel Houweling
5	DF	NED	Carmen Werkhoven
5	MF	JPN	Kira Chinatsu
7	FW	NED	Sam de Jong
8	MF	NED	Moisa Verkuijl
9	FW	NED	Rochelity Dap
11	MF	NED	Lynn Vos
12	DF	NED	Esra Neter
13	FW	IDN	Claudia Scheunemann

No.	Pos.	Nation	Player
14	MF	NED	Ziva Henry
16	DF	NED	Kiki Heshof
17	FW	NED	Fay van Hoof
19	FW	NED	Ina Booms
20	FW	NED	Lotje de Keijzer
21	DF	NED	Vanilla van Marsbergen
22	DF	NED	Merle Touw
23	DF	ARU	Michaela Netto
24	GK	NED	Loïs de Heus
33	DF	NED	Aline Weerelts
34	FW	MAR	Melek Hader

=== Former players ===
Internationals

- Netherlands: Eshly Bakker, Angela Christ, Petra Hogewoning, Anouk Hoogendijk, Myrthe Moorrees, Tessa Oudejans, Mandy Versteegt, Miranda Verrips
- Suriname: Naomi Piqué

== Head coaches ==
- (Netherlands) Maria van Kortenhof (2007–2009)
- (Netherlands) Mark Verkuijl (2009–2012)
- (Germany) Jürgen Schefczyk (2012–2014)
- (Netherlands) Linda Helbling (2023–2026)
- (Netherlands) Sylvia Smit (2026–present)
