= Chantal de Ridder =

Dutch footballer (born 1989)

Personal information
- Full name: Chantal Alida Maria de Ridder
- Date of birth: 19 January 1989 (age 37)
- Place of birth: Leiden, Netherlands
- Height: 1.72 m (5 ft 8 in)
- Position: Striker

Youth career
- 1994–2001: Ter Leede
- 2001–2006: Foreholte

Senior career*
Years	Team	Apps	(Gls)
2006–2007	Ter Leede		
2007–2011	AZ	78	(45)
2011–2013	Turbine Potsdam	7	(0)
2013–2019	Ajax	90	(31)

International career^{‡}
2007–2013	Netherlands	46	(10)
- * Club domestic league appearances and goals as of 24 December 2015 ‡ National team caps and goals as of 24 December 2015

Chantal Alida Maria de Ridder (born 19 January 1989) is a Dutch former football striker, who played for BeNe League club AFC Ajax as well as the senior Netherlands women's national football team.

She had previously competed in the Netherlands' Eredivisie, winning four titles with Ter Leede and AZ.

== Club career ==
=== AZ ===
De Ridder scored a hattrick against PEC Zwolle on 21 April 2011.

=== Turbine Potsdam ===
Before signing for Ajax in January 2013, De Ridder last played for Turbine Potsdam in Germany's Bundesliga. She made her league debut against Bayer Leverkusen on 28 August 2011. De Ridder scored her first goal for the club in the DFB-Pokal Frauen against Sindelfingen on 30 October 2011, scoring in the 79th minute. She scored for Turbine in the 10–0 2011–12 Champions League home win against Glasgow City.

Due to a long-term knee injury suffered in December 2011, she only played seven Bundesliga matches. She left Potsdam in January 2013 and headed back to the Netherlands, intent on getting more match practice and breaking back into the Dutch team ahead of UEFA Women's Euro 2013.

=== Ajax ===
De Ridder made her league debut against Lierse on 19 February 2013. She scored her first league goal against Beerschot on 23 February 2013, scoring in the 17th minute. De Ridder scored a hattrick against PEC Zwolle on 4 October 2013. On 14 June 2018, it was announced that she had signed a new deal.

== International career ==
She was a member of the Dutch national team, and played in the 2009 European Championship after making her senior debut on 29 July 2007 against North Korea.

In June 2013 national team coach Roger Reijners selected De Ridder in the Netherlands squad for UEFA Women's Euro 2013 in Sweden.

== International goals ==
Scores and results list the Netherlands goal tally first.

Goal	Date	Venue	Opponent	Score	Result	Competition
1.	14 December 2008	Stade Paul Cosyns, Compiègne, France	France	2–0	2–0	Friendly
2.	12 March 2009	GSP Stadium, Nicosia, Cyprus	South Africa	5–0	5–0	2009 Cyprus Cup
3.	13 July 2009	Olympic Stadium, Amsterdam, Netherlands	South Africa	1–1	3–2	Four Nations Cup
4.	22 April 2010	Gradski Stadion, Kumanovo, Macedonia	North Macedonia	6–0	7–0	2011 FIFA Women's World Cup qualification
5.	21 August 2010	Haradzki Stadium, Maladzechna, Belarus	Belarus	4–0	4–0	2011 FIFA Women's World Cup qualification
6.	12 December 2010	Estádio do Pacaembu, São Paulo, Brazil	Brazil	2–1	2–3	2010 City of São Paulo Tournament
7.	7 March 2011	Ammochostos Stadium, Larnaca, Cyprus	Switzerland	4–0	6–0	2011 Cyprus Cup
8.	7 March 2011	Ammochostos Stadium, Larnaca, Cyprus	Switzerland	6–0	6–0	2011 Cyprus Cup
9.	19 November 2011	Ivančna Gorica Stadium, Ivančna Gorica, Slovenia	Slovenia	2–0	2–0	2013 UEFA Women's Euro qualification
10.	24 November 2011	Kyocera Stadion, The Hague, Netherlands	Croatia	1–0	2–0	2013 UEFA Women's Euro qualification

== Personal life ==
De Ridder has one daughter.

== Honours ==
Ter Leede

- Dutch Championship (1): 2006–07
- Dutch Cup (1): 2006–07

AZ

- Eredivisie (3): 2007–08, 2008–09, 2009–10
- Dutch Cup (1): 2010–11

Turbine Potsdam

- Bundesliga (1): 2011–12

Ajax

- Eredivisie (1): 2016–17
- Dutch Cup (2): 2013–14, 2016–17
