= Maartje Looijen =

Dutch footballer

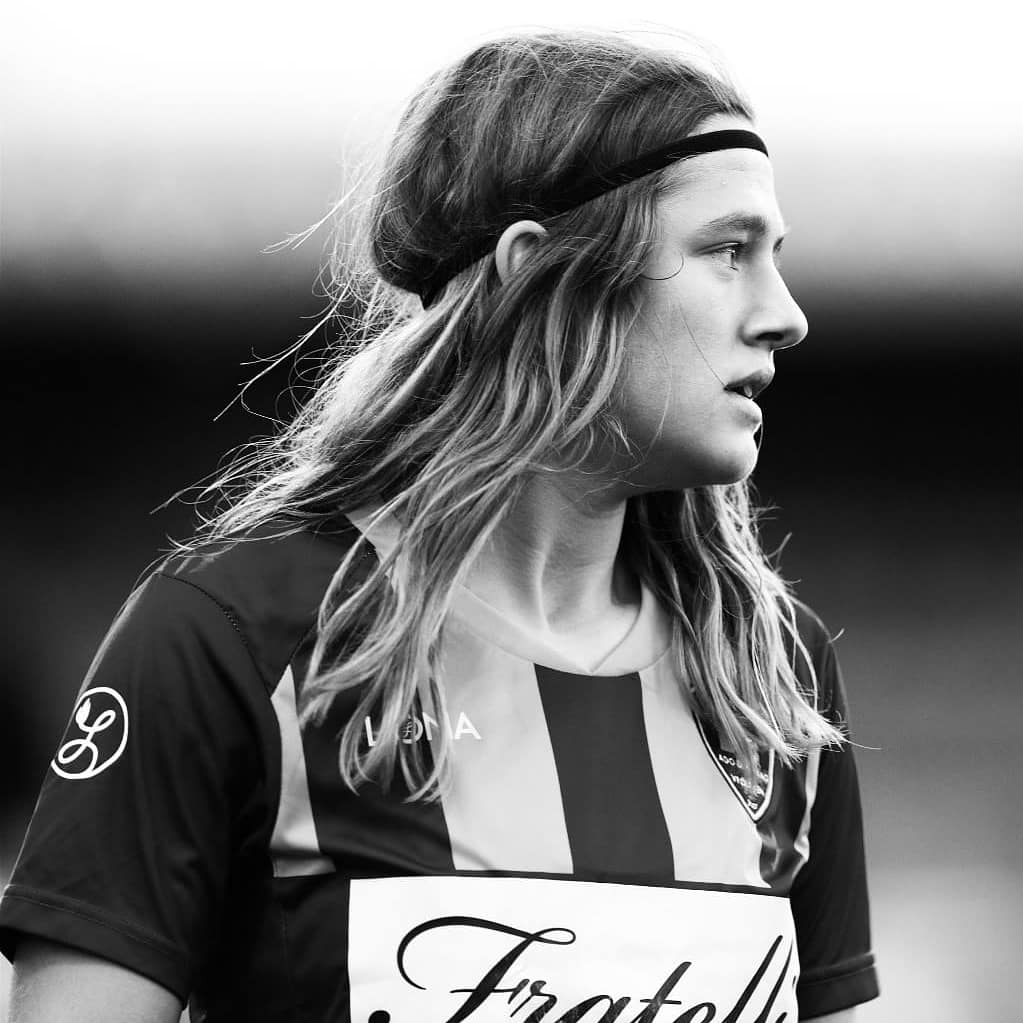

Personal information
- Date of birth: 16 November 1998 (age 27)
- Place of birth: Leidschendam, Netherlands
- Position: Forward

Team information
- Current team: Ter Leede

Youth career
- ADO Den Haag

Senior career*
Years	Team	Apps	(Gls)
2015–2023	ADO Den Haag	87	(14)
2023–	Ter Leede		

International career
2014	Netherlands U16	6	(0)
2014	Netherlands U17	1	(0)
2015	Netherlands U19	2	(0)
- * Club domestic league appearances and goals as of 17:31, 12 June 2024

Maartje Looijen (born 16 November 1998) is a Dutch footballer who plays as a forward for Ter Leede.

== Career ==
=== ADO Den Haag ===
Looijen made her league debut against PEC Zwolle on 27 February 2015. She scored her first league goal against PEC Zwolle on 26 February 2016, scoring in the 61st minute. On 19 April 2019, it was announced she had signed a new deal. On 8 June 2020, Looijen, along with Jannette van Belen and Bo Vonk, extended their deals. Looijen suffered a cruciate ligament injury in 2022. She left the club in 2023 after her contract was not renewed, playing 117 matches.

=== Ter Leede ===
On 2 June 2023, it was announced that Looijen had joined Ter Leede.

== International career ==
Looijen made her U19 debut against Moldova U19s on 17 September 2015.

Looijen was on the provisional list of players for the 2018 FIFA U-20 Women's World Cup, but opted out after not feeling ready for the tournament.

== Personal life ==
After obtaining a bachelor's degree in art history, Looijen started a clothing store called Beyond Funky Clothing with her sister Esmée.
