= Sylvia Smit =

Dutch footballer (born 1986)

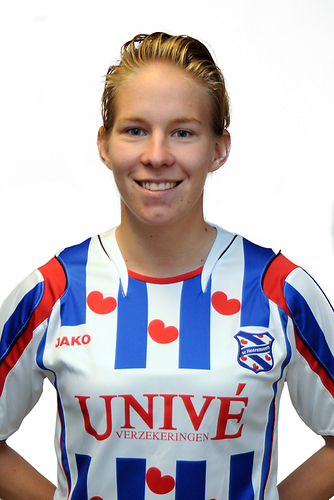

Personal information
- Full name: Sylvia Smit
- Date of birth: 4 July 1986 (age 40)
- Place of birth: Stadskanaal, Netherlands
- Height: 1.68 m (5 ft 6 in)
- Positions: Midfielder; striker

Team information
- Current team: PEC Zwolle
- Number: 10

Youth career
- VV SETA
- VV SPW
- SC Stadskanaal

Senior career*
Years	Team	Apps	(Gls)
2002–2005	Oranje Nassau		
2005–2007	Be Quick '28		
2007–2008	FC Twente	20	(10)
2008–2011	SC Heerenveen	63	(34)
2011–2014	PEC Zwolle	68	(31)
2014–2015	SC Heerenveen	24	(5)
2015–	DTS Ede		

International career^{‡}
2004–2013	Netherlands	106	(30)
- * Club domestic league appearances and goals as of 10:15, 1 February 2011 (UTC) ‡ National team caps and goals as of 10 January 2018

Sylvia Smit (born 4 July 1986) is a Dutch former footballer who plays as a midfielder and striker for clubs in the Dutch Eredivisie Vrouwen and the Belgian-Dutch BeNe League. She also had 106 appearances for the Netherlands women's national football team.

== Club career ==
Smit's career started at amateur clubs SETA (from Musselkanaal), SPW and SC Stadskanaal (both from Stadskanaal). In 2002, she joined Oranje Nassau, winning the KNVB Women's Cup in her third and final season at the club. She then joined Be Quick '28 in 2005 and was the top scorer of the Hoofdklasse. When the professional Dutch women's league, the Eredivisie Vrouwen, was formed in 2007, she joined FC Twente for the league's inaugural season and won her second Dutch Cup at the club. In 2008, she joined SC Heerenveen and was the Eredivisie top scorer for two consecutive seasons, with 14 goals in 2008–09 and 11 goals in 2009–10.

She joined FC Zwolle in 2011 and when the Belgian and Dutch leagues merged creating the BeNe League. She played the inaugural season for the club (then renamed PEC Zwolle).

On 1 August 2014, she returned to SC Heerenveen and signed a one-year contract.

On 11 June 2015, it was announced she was joining DTS Ede in the Dutch Topklasse.

== International career ==
On 6 August 2004 Smit debuted for the senior Netherlands women's national football team, playing the first half of a 2–0 friendly defeat to Japan in Zeist.

Smit also featured in the Dutch run to the semi-final of UEFA Women's Euro 2009, playing all of the Netherlands five matches in the tournament and scoring a goal.

On 25 November 2012, she earned her 100th cap for the national team in a friendly match against Wales at Velsen, scoring the first goal of the 2–0 Dutch win.

In June 2013 national team coach Roger Reijners selected Smit in his Netherlands squad for UEFA Women's Euro 2013 in Sweden. She came on as a substitute in the tournament against Iceland on 17 July 2013, her final appearance for the Netherlands.

=== International goals ===
Scores and results list the Netherlands goal tally first.

Goal	Date	Venue	Opponent	Score	Result	Competition
1.	18 September 2004	Sportpark De Wending, Heerhugowaard, Netherlands	England	1–0	1–2	Friendly
2.	20 September 2006	Oosterenkstadion, Zwolle, Netherlands	Austria	3–0	4–0	2007 FIFA Women's World Cup qualification
3.	20 September 2006	Oosterenkstadion, Zwolle, Netherlands	Austria	4–0	4–0	2007 FIFA Women's World Cup qualification
4.	24 September 2006	Oosterenkstadion, Zwolle, Netherlands	Hungary	3–0	4–0	2007 FIFA Women's World Cup qualification
5.	22 November 2006	Mitsubishi Forklift Stadion, Almere, Netherlands	Russia	3–0	5–0	Friendly
6.	26 August 2007	Veronica Stadium, Volendam, Netherlands	Wales	2–0	2–1	2009 UEFA Women's Euro qualification
7.	4 May 2008	Univé Stadion, Emmen, Netherlands	China	2–1	2–2	Friendly
8.	7 March 2009	GSZ Stadium, Larnaca, Cyprus	Canada	1–2	1–2	2009 Cyprus Cup
9.	12 March 2009	GSP Stadium, Nicosia, Cyprus	South Africa	2–0	5–0	2009 Cyprus Cup
10.	25 April 2009	Kórinn Stadium, Kópavogur, Iceland	Iceland	1–1	1–1	Friendly
11.	29 August 2009	Lahden Stadion, Lahti, Finland	Denmark	1–0	2–1	2009 UEFA Women's Euro
12.	29 October 2009	Oosterenkstadion, Zwolle, Netherlands	North Macedonia	2–0	13–1	2011 FIFA Women's World Cup qualification
13.	29 October 2009	Oosterenkstadion, Zwolle, Netherlands	North Macedonia	5–0	13–1	2011 FIFA Women's World Cup qualification
14.	29 October 2009	Oosterenkstadion, Zwolle, Netherlands	North Macedonia	6–0	13–1	2011 FIFA Women's World Cup qualification
15.	29 October 2009	Oosterenkstadion, Zwolle, Netherlands	North Macedonia	11–1	13–1	2011 FIFA Women's World Cup qualification
16.	29 October 2009	Oosterenkstadion, Zwolle, Netherlands	North Macedonia	12–1	13–1	2011 FIFA Women's World Cup qualification
17.	29 October 2009	Oosterenkstadion, Zwolle, Netherlands	North Macedonia	13–1	13–1	2011 FIFA Women's World Cup qualification
18.	24 February 2010	GSP Stadium, Nicosia, Cyprus	Scotland	2–0	4–1	2010 Cyprus Cup
19.	3 March 2010	GSP Stadium, Nicosia, Cyprus	Switzerland	2–0	4–0	2010 Cyprus Cup
20.	3 March 2010	GSP Stadium, Nicosia, Cyprus	Switzerland	3–0	4–0	2010 Cyprus Cup
21.	27 March 2010	Polman Stadion, Almelo, Netherlands	Slovakia	1–0	2–0	2011 FIFA Women's World Cup qualification
22.	22 April 2010	Gradski Stadion, Kumanovo, Macedonia	North Macedonia	3–0	7–0	2011 FIFA Women's World Cup qualification
23.	6 June 2010	Sportpark De Dorens, Loenhout, Belgium	Belgium	2–0	2–0	Friendly
24.	15 December 2010	Estádio do Pacaembu, São Paulo, Brazil	Mexico	3–1	3–1	2010 Torneio Internacional
25.	3 April 2011	Kras Stadion, Volendam, Netherlands	Scotland	2–0	6–2	Friendly
26.	3 April 2011	Kras Stadion, Volendam, Netherlands	Scotland	3–0	6–2	Friendly
27.	22 October 2011	Gradski stadion, Vrbovec, Croatia	Croatia	3–0	3–0	2013 UEFA Women's Euro qualification
28.	6 March 2012	Dasaki Stadium, Achna, Cyprus	New Zealand	1–0	2–2	2012 Cyprus Cup
29.	6 March 2012	Dasaki Stadium, Achna, Cyprus	New Zealand	2–2	2–2	2012 Cyprus Cup
30.	25 November 2012	Telstar Stadion, Velsen-Zuid, Netherlands	Wales	1–0	2–0	Friendly

== Honours ==
Oranje Nassau

- KNVB Women's Cup (1): 2004–05

FC Twente

- KNVB Women's Cup (1): 2007–08

DTS Ede

- Topklasse (1): 2015–16

== Post-career ==
In 2018, Smit was knighted by the KNVB. In 2022, she was an assistant coach for the Dutch women's under-16 team.
