= Manon van Raay =

Dutch footballer (born 2003)

Personal information
- Date of birth: 16 July 2003 (age 23)
- Place of birth: Woerden, Netherlands
- Position: Midfielder

Team information
- Current team: Oud-Heverlee Leuven
- Number: 28

Youth career
- VV Unio
- FC Oudewater
- ADO Den Haag

Senior career*
Years	Team	Apps	(Gls)
2020–2025	ADO Den Haag	55	(6)
2025–	Oud-Heverlee Leuven		
- * Club domestic league appearances and goals as of 28 September 2024

Manon van Raay (born 16 July 2003) is a Dutch professional footballer who plays as midfielder for Oud-Heverlee Leuven.

== Club career ==
Van Raay initially played on boy's teams at VV Unio and FC Oudewater. She then moved to the youth of ADO Den Haag.

Since summer 2020, Van Raay plays for the women's first squad of ADO Den Haag. Immediately, in her friendly-game debut against Ter Leede, coming late into the game, she scored a goal and had an assist. Her Eredivisie debut followed in December 2020, against SBV Excelsior.

During the COVID-19 pandemic in the Netherlands, Van Raay was reported to have trouble returning home on time for night curfew.

Season	Club	Country	League	Caps	Goals
2020–21	ADO Den Haag	Netherlands	Women's Eredivisie	6	1
2021–22	ADO Den Haag	Netherlands	Women's Eredivisie	2^	0^
Total				8	1

^ ongoing

== International career ==
Van Raay played in the national under-19 team of the Netherlands. She now is a member of the national under-19 team.

== Personal life ==
Van Raay was born in Woerden.

== Honours ==
- Nominated for 2019 Best Young Female Athlete of Oudewater
