= 2007–08 Eredivisie (women) =

Eredivisie Vrouwen
- Season: 2007–08
- Dates: 29 August 2007 – 21 May 2008
- Champions: AZ (1st title)
- UEFA Women's Cup: AZ
- Matches: 60
- Goals: 169 (2.82 per match)
- Top goalscorer: Karin Stevens (20)
- Total attendance: 45,695 (762 per match)

The 2007–08 Eredivisie Vrouwen was the first season of the Netherlands women's professional football league. It took place from 29 August 2007 until 21 May 2008 with six teams participating. AZ became the first Eredivisie winners. The 60 matches of the season had a 45,695 total attendance.

== Teams ==
Location of teams in the Eredivisie 2007–08

On 20 March 2007, the league was officially unveiled by the KNVB with the six clubs taking part.

Team	City / Town	Venue(s)	Capacity
ADO Den Haag	The Hague	Den Haag Stadion	15,000
ADO Den Haag	The Hague	Sportpark Nieuw Hanenburg	1,500
AZ	Alkmaar	Sportpark Schoonenberg (Velsen)	3,625
AZ	Alkmaar	Sportcomplex 't Lood	
AZ	Alkmaar	DSB Stadion	17,000
SC Heerenveen	Heerenveen	Sportpark Skoatterwâld	3,000
SC Heerenveen	Heerenveen	Zuidersportpark (Sneek)	3,150
SC Heerenveen	Heerenveen	Abe Lenstra Stadion	26,000
FC Twente	Enschede	Arke Stadion	30,205
FC Twente	Enschede	Sportpark Slangenbeek (Hengelo)	2,000
FC Twente	Enschede	FC Twente-trainingscentrum (Hengelo)	1,000
FC Utrecht	Utrecht	Sportpark Elinkwijk	5,000
FC Utrecht	Utrecht	Sportpark Maarschalkerweerd	1,000
FC Utrecht	Utrecht	Sportcomplex Zoudenbalch	450
FC Utrecht	Utrecht	Stadion Galgenwaard	23,750
Willem II	Tilburg	Sportcomplex Bijstervelden	1,500

Source: Soccerway

== Format ==
The season was played in a quadruple round-robin format, where all six participating teams played each other four times (twice away and twice at home), a total of 20 matches each. The champion qualified to the UEFA Women's Cup. There was no relegation system in place.

== Standings ==
Pos	Team	Pld	W	D	L	GF	GA	GD	Pts	Qualification
1	AZ (C, Q)	20	11	4	5	29	16	+13	37	2008–09 UEFA Women's Cup
2	Willem II	20	10	4	6	41	21	+20	34	
3	Utrecht	20	10	2	8	35	29	+6	32	
4	ADO Den Haag	20	7	8	5	25	27	−2	29	
5	Twente	20	7	3	10	27	36	−9	24	
6	Heerenveen	20	2	5	13	12	40	−28	11	

Source: soccerway
Rules for classification: 1) Points; 2) Goal difference; 3) Number of goals scored
(C) Champions; (Q) Qualified for the phase indicated

== Results ==
Season's first half

Home \ Away	ADO	AZ	HEE	TWE	UTR	WIL
ADO Den Haag		0–1	1–1	1–1	3–0	1–0
AZ	0–1		4–0	0–1	2–0	2–1
Heerenveen	1–2	0–1		0–2	0–1	0–5
Twente	3–2	1–2	2–3		2–3	2–0
Utrecht	4–0	0–2	4–1	0–2		1–0
Willem II	1–1	0–0	3–0	5–2	0–5	

Source: soccerway
Legend: Blue = home team win; Yellow = draw; Red = away team win.

Season's second half

Home \ Away	ADO	AZ	HEE	TWE	UTR	WIL
ADO Den Haag		0–0	0–0	2–0	2–2	1–4
AZ	1–1		2–1	3–1	2–3	1–0
Heerenveen	1–2	1–0		0–2	0–3	1–1
Twente	2–2	0–2	0–0		3–2	0–5
Utrecht	2–3	3–2	0–0	2–1		0–3
Willem II	3–0	2–2	5–2	2–0	1–0	

Source: soccerway
Legend: Blue = home team win; Yellow = draw; Red = away team win.

== Top scorers ==
Pos.	Player	Club	Goals
1	(Netherlands) Karin Stevens	Willem II	20
2	(Netherlands) Sylvia Smit	FC Twente	10
3	(Netherlands) Claudia van den Heiligenberg	AZ	9
3	(Netherlands) Dominique Vugts	Willem II	9
5	(Netherlands) Shirley Smith	FC Utrecht	8
6	(Netherlands) Anouk Dekker	FC Twente	6
6	(Netherlands) Nangila van Eyck	ADO Den Haag	6
8	(Netherlands) Chantal de Ridder	AZ	5
9	(Netherlands) Sheila van den Bulk	ADO Den Haag	4
9	(Netherlands) Dionne Demarteau	AZ	4
9	(Netherlands) Merel van Nes	AZ	4
9	(Netherlands) Marieke van Ottele	FC Twente	4
9	(Netherlands) Gilanne Louwaars	FC Utrecht	4
9	(Netherlands) Roos Kwakkenbos	FC Utrecht	4
9	(Netherlands) Tessa Oudejans	FC Utrecht	4
9	(Belgium) Femke Maes	Willem II	4
17	8 players		3
25	11 players		2
36	16 players		1
Own goals			2
Total:			169
Games:			60
Average:			2.82

Source: vrouwenvoetbalnederland.nl
