= Priscilla de Vos =

Dutch football player

Personal information
- Date of birth: 14 January 1987 (age 39)
- Place of birth: Leiden, Netherlands
- Position: Forward

Senior career*
Years	Team	Apps	(Gls)
- Telstar

International career
2003–2004	Netherlands U17	9	(1)
2004–2006	Netherlands U19	17	(8)
2013	Netherlands	2	(1)
- * Club domestic league appearances and goals

Priscilla de Vos (born 14 January 1987) is a Dutch former footballer who played as a forward for Eredivisie club Telstar and the Netherlands national team.

== International career ==
De Vos made her debut for Netherlands national team on 9 February 2013 by scoring the winning goal in a 3–2 win against Belgium.

== Career statistics ==
=== International ===
Appearances and goals by national team and year
National team	Year	Apps	Goals
Netherlands	2013	2	1
Total		2	1

Scores and results list Netherlands' goal tally first, score column indicates score after each de Vos goal.

List of international goals scored by Priscilla de Vos
No.	Date	Venue	Opponent	Score	Result	Competition
1	9 February 2013	Elindus Arena, Waregem, Belgium	Belgium	3–2	3–2	Friendly

== Honours ==
Individual

- Eredivisie top scorer: 2011–12
