= 2008–09 Eredivisie (women) =

Eredivisie Vrouwen
- Season: 2008–09
- Dates: 21 August 2008 – 31 May 2009
- Champions: AZ (2nd title)
- UEFA Women's Champions League: AZ
- Matches: 84
- Goals: 243 (2.89 per match)
- Top goalscorer: Sylvia Smit (14)
- Total attendance: 56,365 (671 per match)

The 2008–09 Eredivisie Vrouwen was the second season of the Netherlands women's professional football league. The league took place from 21 August 2008 to 31 May 2009 with seven teams. AZ successfully defended the title and became champions for a second year running. AZ won the title in its final match day, defeating Willem II 6–0 to get 3 points clear of Willem and ADO Den Haag. The 84 matches of the season had a 56,365 total attendance.

== Teams ==
Location of teams in the Eredivisie 2008–09

On 15 April 2008, Roda JC was confirmed as the league's seventh team. The team announced in May 2009 that it would disband after the season.

Team	City / Town	Venue(s)	Capacity
ADO Den Haag	The Hague	Den Haag Stadion	15,000
ADO Den Haag	The Hague	Sportpark Nieuw Hanenburg	1,500
ADO Den Haag	The Hague	Sportpark De Aftrap	
AZ	Alkmaar	Sportpark Schoonenberg (Velsen)	3,625
AZ	Alkmaar	Sportcomplex 't Lood	
AZ	Alkmaar	DSB Stadion	17,000
SC Heerenveen	Heerenveen	Sportpark Skoatterwâld	3,000
SC Heerenveen	Heerenveen	Zuidersportpark (Sneek)	3,150
SC Heerenveen	Heerenveen	Abe Lenstra Stadion	26,000
Roda JC	Kerkrade	Sportpark Kaalheide	14,000
Roda JC	Kerkrade	Parkstad Limburg Stadion	19,900
FC Twente	Enschede	De Grolsch Veste	30,205
FC Twente	Enschede	Sportpark Slangenbeek (Hengelo)	2,000
FC Twente	Enschede	FC Twente-trainingscentrum (Hengelo)	1,000
FC Utrecht	Utrecht	Sportpark Elinkwijk	5,000
FC Utrecht	Utrecht	Sportpark Maarschalkerweerd	1,000
FC Utrecht	Utrecht	Sportcomplex Zoudenbalch	450
FC Utrecht	Utrecht	Stadion Galgenwaard	23,750
FC Utrecht	Utrecht	Sportpark Saestum	
Willem II	Tilburg	Sportcomplex Bijstervelden	1,500
Willem II	Tilburg	Willem II Stadion	14,500

Source: Soccerway

== Format ==
The season was played in a quadruple round-robin format, where all seven participating teams played each other four times (twice away and twice at home), a total of 24 matches each. The champion qualified for the newly created UEFA Women's Champions League. There was no relegation system in place.

== Standings ==
Pos	Team	Pld	W	D	L	GF	GA	GD	Pts	Qualification
1	AZ (C, Q)	24	15	4	5	45	16	+29	49	2009–10 UEFA Women's Champions League
2	ADO Den Haag	24	14	4	6	42	24	+18	46	
3	Willem II	24	14	4	6	44	34	+10	46	
4	Utrecht	24	11	4	9	34	31	+3	37	
5	Twente	24	10	3	11	28	30	−2	33	
6	Heerenveen	24	6	3	15	28	43	−15	21	
7	Roda JC	24	1	4	19	22	65	−43	7	

Source: soccerway
Rules for classification: 1) Points; 2) Goal difference; 3) Number of goals scored
(C) Champions; (Q) Qualified for the phase indicated

== Results ==
Season's first half

Home \ Away	ADO	AZ	HEE	RJC	TWE	UTR	WIL
ADO Den Haag		0–1	4–1	0–0	2–3	3–2	1–0
AZ	1–0		0–0	3–0	1–1	0–0	5–2
Heerenveen	0–1	2–0		2–1	1–3	1–2	1–2
Roda JC	2–2	1–4	1–6		3–1	1–2	0–2
Twente	0–1	2–3	0–3	1–0		0–1	0–3
Utrecht	0–3	1–0	0–0	4–0	2–1		0–1
Willem II	2–1	1–1	1–0	3–2	1–1	3–3	

Source: soccerway
Legend: Blue = home team win; Yellow = draw; Red = away team win.

Season's second half

Home \ Away	ADO	AZ	HEE	RJC	TWE	UTR	WIL
ADO Den Haag		0–1	3–0	5–0	1–0	2–2	2–5
AZ	0–1		3–1	3–0	0–2	4–1	2–1
Heerenveen	1–2	0–4		3–3	2–1	0–2	1–4
Roda JC	0–2	0–2	3–4		1–3	1–3	2–2
Twente	1–1	0–1	1–0	2–0		1–0	2–1
Utrecht	1–2	1–0	1–0	2–1	2–3		0–1
Willem II	1–3	0–6	1–0	4–0	1–0	2–1	

Source: soccerway
Legend: Blue = home team win; Yellow = draw; Red = away team win.

== Top scorers ==
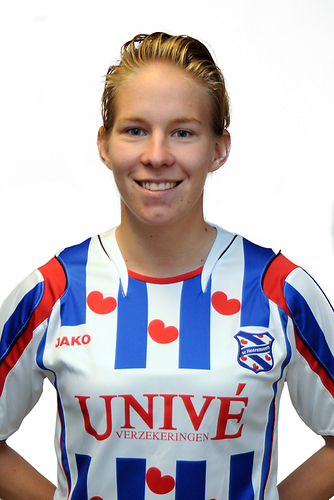
Sylvia Smit (SC Heerenveen) Topscorer, 14 goals

Pos.	Player	Club	Goals
1	(Netherlands) Sylvia Smit	SC Heerenveen	14
2	(Netherlands) Marlous Pieëte	FC Twente	12
3	(Netherlands) Claudia van den Heiligenberg	AZ	11
4	(Netherlands) Chantal de Ridder	AZ	10
4	(Netherlands) Karin Stevens	Willem II	10
4	(Netherlands) Dominique Vugts	Willem II	10
7	(Netherlands) Lisanne Vermeulen	FC Utrecht	9
7	(Netherlands) Kirsten van de Ven	Willem II	9
9	(Netherlands) Lisanne Grimberg	ADO Den Haag	8
9	(Netherlands) Renate Jansen	ADO Den Haag	8
11	(Netherlands) Jill Wilmot	ADO Den Haag	7
12	(Netherlands) Gilanne Louwaars	FC Utrecht	6
12	(Netherlands) Liesbeth Migchelsen	AZ	6
14	(Wales) Jessica Fishlock	AZ	5
14	(Netherlands) Sherida Spitse	SC Heerenveen	5
16	6 players		4
22	13 players		3
35	13 players		2
48	21 players		1
Own goals			3
Total:			243
Games:			84
Average:			2.89

Source: vrouwenvoetbalnederland.nl
