= Tessa Oudejans =

Dutch footballer

Personal information
- Full name: Tessa Oudejans
- Date of birth: 21 October 1991 (age 35)
- Place of birth: Badhoevedorp, Netherlands
- Positions: Midfielder; striker

Senior career*
Years	Team	Apps	(Gls)
2007–2013	Utrecht	75+	(19+)
2013–2015	ADO Den Haag	49	(15)
- Excelsior Maassluis

International career
2008–2012	Netherlands	17	(0)
- * Club domestic league appearances and goals

Tessa Oudejans (born 21 October 1991) is a Dutch former football midfielder, who played for FC Utrecht and ADO Den Haag of the Eredivisie.

She was a member of the Dutch national team.

== Career ==
=== Utrecht ===
In 2012, Oudejans was voted the best player of the Eredivisie.

Oudejans scored against OH Leuven on 2 February 2013. She scored a penalty to help take Utrecht to the cup quarterfinals on 16 February 2013. Oudejans scored a brace against Sint-Truiden on 22 March 2013.

Oudejans made her last appearance for Utrecht against PEC Zwolle on 25 May 2013. She scored her last goals for the club against Sint-Truiden on 18 May 2013, scoring a brace in the 18th and 80th minute.

Oudejans was captain of Utrecht during 2013.

=== ADO Den Haag ===
Oudejans joined ADO Den Haag. She scored on her league debut against Anderlecht on 30 August 2013, scoring a brace in the 42nd and 80th minute. Oudejans scored against Telstar on 14 November 2014.

== International career ==
Oudejans made her international debut against Spain on 25 October 2008.

== Post-playing career ==
After retiring, Oudejans became a physiotherapist and started playing for Excelsior Maassluis.
