= Bo Vonk =

Dutch footballer

Personal information
- Date of birth: 28 March 2000 (age 26)
- Place of birth: Sassenheim, Netherlands,
- Position: Defender

Team information
- Current team: ADO Den Haag
- Number: 2

Youth career
- Ter Leede
- -2019: ADO Den Haag

Senior career*
Years	Team	Apps	(Gls)
2019-	ADO Den Haag	80	(1)
- * Club domestic league appearances and goals

Bo Vonk (born 28 March 2000) is a Dutch footballer who plays as defender for ADO Den Haag in the Eredivisie.

== Career ==
Vonk started her career at Sassenheim's amateur football club Ter Leede. She played with the men's team to gain experience before eventually transferring to ADO Den Haag. She was the Dutch street football champion in 2013. Her first Eredivisie match was on 21 December 2018 against PSV

== Personal life ==
Vonk was born in Sassenheim.
