= 2009–10 Eredivisie (women) =

Eredivisie Vrouwen
- Season: 2009–10
- Dates: 1 October 2009 – 19 May 2010
- Champions: AZ (3rd title)
- UEFA Women's Champions League: AZ
- Matches: 60
- Goals: 147 (2.45 per match)
- Top goalscorer: Sylvia Smit, Chantal de Ridder (11 each)
- Total attendance: 22,140 (369 per match)

The 2009–10 Eredivisie Vrouwen was the third season of the Netherlands women's professional football league. The league took place from 1 October 2009 to 19 May 2010 with six teams. AZ (Alkmaar Zaanstreek) successfully defended the title and became champions for the third consecutive season. The 60 matches of the season had a 22,140 total attendance.

== Teams ==
Location of teams in the Eredivisie 2009–10

On 5 May 2009, Roda JC announced that financial problems led it to withdraw from the league after one season. The six founding teams played in the season.

Team	City / Town	Venue(s)	Capacity
ADO Den Haag	The Hague	Den Haag Stadion	15,000
ADO Den Haag	The Hague	Sportpark Nieuw Hanenburg	1,500
AZ	Alkmaar	TATA Steel Stadion (Velsen)	3,625
AZ	Alkmaar	Sportcomplex 't Lood	
AZ	Alkmaar	AZ Stadion	17,000
SC Heerenveen	Heerenveen	Sportpark Skoatterwâld	3,000
SC Heerenveen	Heerenveen	Zuidersportpark (Sneek)	3,150
SC Heerenveen	Heerenveen	Abe Lenstra Stadion	26,000
FC Twente	Enschede	De Grolsch Veste	30,205
FC Twente	Enschede	Sportpark Slangenbeek (Hengelo)	2,000
FC Twente	Enschede	FC Twente-trainingscentrum (Hengelo)	1,000
FC Utrecht	Utrecht	Sportpark Elinkwijk	5,000
FC Utrecht	Utrecht	Sportpark Maarschalkerweerd	1,000
FC Utrecht	Utrecht	Sportcomplex Zoudenbalch	450
FC Utrecht	Utrecht	Sportpark Saestum (Zeist)	
Willem II	Tilburg	Sportcomplex Bijstervelden	1,500
Willem II	Tilburg	Willem II Stadion	14,500

Source: Soccerway

== Format ==
The season was played in a quadruple round-robin format, where all six participating teams played each other four times (twice away and twice at home), a total of 20 matches each. The champion qualified to the UEFA Women's Champions League. There was no relegation system in place.

== Standings ==
Pos	Team	Pld	W	D	L	GF	GA	GD	Pts	Qualification
1	AZ (C, Q)	20	12	5	3	32	11	+21	41	2010–11 UEFA Women's Champions League
2	ADO Den Haag	20	11	4	5	24	16	+8	37	
3	Willem II	20	8	2	10	26	33	−7	26	
4	Twente	20	5	10	5	29	32	−3	25	
5	Utrecht	20	5	3	12	17	25	−8	18	
6	Heerenveen	20	4	6	10	19	30	−11	18	

Source: soccerway
Rules for classification: 1) Points; 2) Goal difference; 3) Number of goals scored
(C) Champions; (Q) Qualified for the phase indicated

== Results ==
Season's first half

Home \ Away	ADO	AZ	HEE	TWE	UTR	WIL
ADO Den Haag		1–0	0–0	1–3	1–0	1–0
AZ	1–2		2–0	1–1	1–0	3–2
Heerenveen	0–0	0–2		4–3	0–1	0–2
Twente	0–2	0–0	1–1		2–1	2–1
Utrecht	1–0	0–1	4–1	1–1		1–2
Willem II	3–1	1–0	1–0	5–2	0–3	

Source: soccerway
Legend: Blue = home team win; Yellow = draw; Red = away team win.

Season's second half

Home \ Away	ADO	AZ	HEE	TWE	UTR	WIL
ADO Den Haag		2–2	1–0	2–2	3–0	2–0
AZ	1–0		3–1	2–0	3–0	1–0
Heerenveen	1–2	1–1		1–1	2–1	2–0
Twente	0–1	0–0	3–3		1–0	2–2
Utrecht	0–1	0–2	1–0	1–1		1–0
Willem II	2–1	0–6	1–0	3–4	1–1	

Source: soccerway
Legend: Blue = home team win; Yellow = draw; Red = away team win.

== Top scorers ==
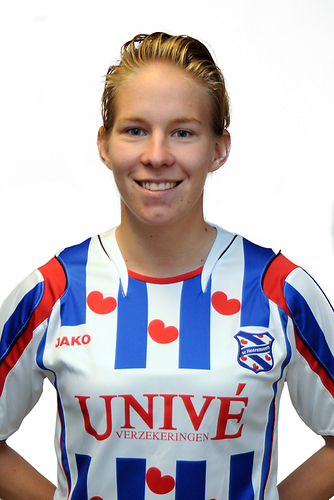
Sylvia Smit of SC Heerenveen 11 Goals

Pos.	Player	Club	Goals
1	(Netherlands) Chantal de Ridder	AZ	11
1	(Netherlands) Sylvia Smit	SC Heerenveen	11
3	(Netherlands) Lisanne Grimberg	ADO Den Haag	7
3	(Netherlands) Renate Jansen	ADO Den Haag	7
3	(Netherlands) Claudia van den Heiligenberg	AZ	7
6	(Netherlands) Suzanne de Kort	FC Twente	6
7	(Netherlands) Jessica Fishlock	AZ	5
7	(Netherlands) Ellen Jansen	FC Twente	5
7	(Netherlands) Marlous Pieëte	FC Twente	5
7	(Netherlands) Renée Slegers	Willem II	5
11	(Netherlands) Manon van den Boogaard	FC Utrecht	4
12	11 players		3
23	7 players		2
30	26 players		1
Owns goal			1
Total:			147
Games:			60
Average:			2.45

Source: vrouwenvoetbalnederland.nl
