= Sandra van Tol =

Dutch footballer

Sandra von Tol
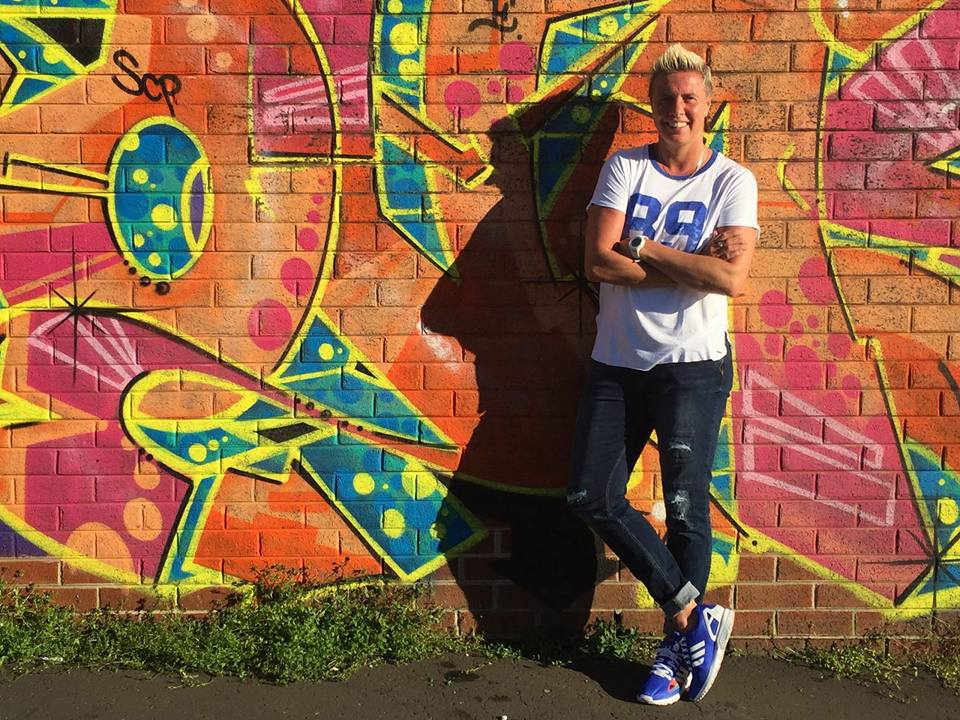

Personal information
- Date of birth: 15 April 1973 (age 53)
- Place of birth: Rotterdam, Netherlands
- Position: Defender

International career
Years	Team	Apps	(Gls)
1993-2003	Netherlands	82	(0)

Sandra von Tol is a former Dutch football player and manager. Since retiring from professional football she now serves as the coach of ADO Den Haag.

== International career ==
On 10 September 1992 , Sandra van Tol won the first of 82 caps for the Dutch national team.
