= Oosterenkstadion =

Former Dutch stadium

Coordinates: 52°31′02″N 6°07′13″E

Oosterenk Stadion
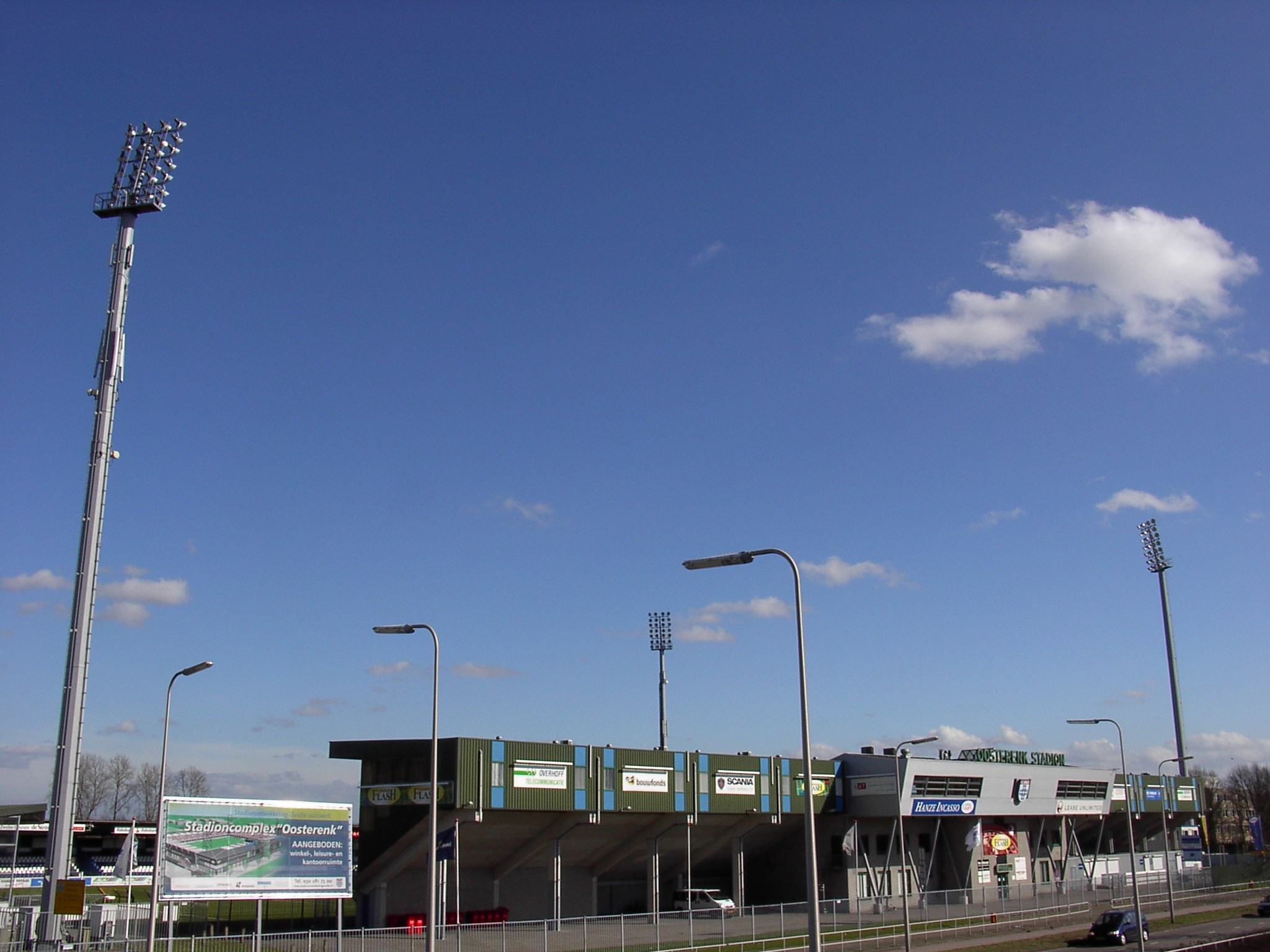
- Interactive map of Oosterenk Stadion
- Full name: Oosterenkstadion
- Location: Ceintuurbaan, Zwolle
- Owner: Jizza Shirazi
- Operator: Husspot
- Capacity: 6,865

Construction
- Built: 1934
- Opened: 1934
- Demolished: 2007

Tenant
- FC Zwolle

The Oosterenkstadion was the stadium of Dutch football club FC Zwolle. At the time of its demolition, the all-seater stadium had a capacity of 6,865 spectators. It was replaced by the FC Zwolle Stadion, later renamed the IJsseldelta Stadion.

The stadium was built in 1934 and was thoroughly renovated in the 1980s. The main stand has been named after Johan Cruijff, because Johan Cruijff had played his last official match, in 1984, against FC Zwolle.

Construction of a new stadium on the location of the current stadium was planned to start in November 2004, but was suspended when citizens of Zwolle protested against plans for a casino in the stadium. For the casino, the local gambling regulations had to be amended. A referendum on the issue in early March 2005 gave the opponents of the casino a resounding victory (approximately 76% of the voters voted against the casino), and the local government decided to abandon the plans. Almost two months later, a new plan was announced, which included a casino in the stadium within the limits set by local gambling regulations.

Construction started in March 2007. The new stadium has a planned capacity of about 10,500 spectators and the total plan (with hotel, casino, restaurants, shops and offices will cost approx. €50 million. It opened on 29 August 2009.

On 22 May 2007 the board of FC Zwolle asked the supporters to come up with suggestions for the names of the new stands. The names had to be those of former players of PEC and of FC Zwolle. This caused an uproar among the supporters, who demanded that one of the stands be named after former chairman and club owner Marten Eibrink. A few days later, on 26 May, the board announced that it had decided to name the north stand of the new stadium, where the most devout supporters would be seated, Marten Eibrink Stand. On 1 June the club started a poll on its website, in which supporters could choose from six names for the three remaining stands: Henk Timmer, Fred Patrick, Jaap Stam, René IJzerman, Leo Koopman, and Klaas Drost. On 14 June the club announced that the three stands would be named after Henk Timmer, Fred Patrick, and Klaas Drost.
