= ADO Den Haag (women) =

Dutch women's football (soccer) club

Coordinates: 52°3′46.11″N 4°22′59.27″E

- Full name: ADO; Haaglandse Football Club; Alles Door Oefening Den Haag
- Founded: 21 January 2007
- Ground: Bingoal Stadion
- Capacity: 15,000
- Chairman: Kees Punt
- Head coach: vacant
- League: Eredivisie
- 2025–26: 9th
- Website: https://adodenhaag.nl/nl/teams/ado-vrouwen/
Home colours	Away colours

ADO Den Haag Vrouwen is a Dutch football club based in The Hague representing ADO Den Haag in the Vrouwen Eredivisie, the top women's football league in the Netherlands. Founded in 2007, the club is a founding member of the league. It is one of three clubs to play in every season of the top Dutch league and the short-lived BeNe League, along with FC Twente and SC Heerenveen.

In 2012, ADO won its first and only national championship. They also achieved the double, winning the KNVB Women's Cup. Since that season, the club has been consistently mid-table, finishing in 4th, 5th, or 6th place in every season and not qualifying for European tournaments. The team had its worst result in 2024–25, landing in seventh place with 11 losses and a -18 goal difference. The team has had more success in the KNVB Cup, winning in 2013 and 2016, reaching the finals in 2021, and playing in the semi-finals four times.

A stork, a symbol and logo of The Hague, is central to the club logo.

== Honours ==
National

- Eredivisie
  - Winners (1): 2011–12
- KNVB Women's Cup
  - Winners (3): 2012, 2013, 2016
- BeNe Super Cup
  - Runner-up (1): 2012

== Results ==
=== Eredivisie/BeNe League ===
4	2	2	2	1	5	6	4	4	4	6	4	5	4	4	5	5	7
08	09	10	11	12	13	14	15	16	17	18	19	20	21	22	23	24	25
Eredivisie (women) / BeNe League

Season	Division	Position	W – D – L = Pts	GF – GA	Top scorer	KNVB Cup
2007–08	Eredivisie	4 / 6	7 – 8 – 5 = 29	25 – 27	van Eyck (6)	Round of 16
2008–09	Eredivisie	2 / 7	14 – 4 – 6 = 46	42 – 24	Grimberg, Jansen (8)	
2009–10	Eredivisie	2 / 6	11 – 4 – 5 = 37	24 – 16	Grimberg, Jansen (7)	Quarterfinals
2010–11	Eredivisie	2 / 8	13 – 4 – 4 = 43	53 – 24	Grimberg, Jansen (14)	Semifinals
2011–12	Eredivisie	1 / 7	15 – 2 – 1 = 47	60 – 18	Jansen, Middag, Wilmot (10)	Champions
2012–13	BeNe League	5 / 16	15 – 5 – 8 = 50	47 – 36	Jansen (15)	Champions
2013–14	BeNe League	6 / 14	12 – 3 – 11 = 39	55 – 39	Jansen (20)	Round of 16
2014–15	BeNe League	4 / 13	12 – 3 – 9 = 39	52 – 35	Beerensteyn (17)	Semifinals
2015–16	Eredivisie	4 / 7	10 – 4 – 10 = 34	45 – 42	Beerensteyn (11)	Champions
2016–17	Eredivisie	4 / 8	13 – 3 – 11 = 42	47 – 48	Rijsdijk (10)	Quarterfinals
2017–18	Eredivisie	6 / 9	12 – 6 – 7 = 42	48 – 36	Pelova (11)	Quarterfinals
2018–19	Eredivisie	4 /9	10 – 5 – 9 = 21	55 – 44	Rijsdijk (17)	Semifinals
2019–20	Eredivisie	5 / 8	3 – 3 – 6 = 12	12 – 16	Grant and Looijen (4)	suspended
2020–21	Eredivisie	4 / 8	5 – 6 – 9 = 11	27 – 33	Ravensbergen (17)	Finals
2021–22	Eredivisie	4 / 9	11 – 6 – 7 = 39	49 – 32	Ravensbergen (11)	Quarterfinals
2022–23	Eredivisie	5 / 11	10 – 2 – 8 = 42	42 – 21	Rijsbergen (11)	Semifinals
2023–24	Eredivisie	5 / 12	9 – 5 – 8 = 32	31 – 23	Loonen (13)	Round of 16
2024–25	Eredivisie	7 / 12	5 – 6 – 11 = 21	25 – 43	van Raay (7)	Quarterfinals

=== European history ===
Competition	Round	Opponent	Home	Away	Agg.
2007–08 UEFA Women's Cup	First qualifying round	(Faroe Islands) KÍ Klaksvík			1–1
2007–08 UEFA Women's Cup	First qualifying round	(Finland) FC Honka			1–0
2007–08 UEFA Women's Cup	First qualifying round	(Iceland) Valur			1–5
2012–13 UEFA Women's Champions League	Round of 32	(Russia) Rossiyanka	1–4	2–1	3–5

== Current squad ==
As of 16 October 2024.

Note: Flags indicate national team as defined under FIFA eligibility rules; some limited exceptions apply. Players may hold more than one non-FIFA nationality.

No.	Pos.	Nation	Player
1	GK	NED	Barbara Lorsheijd
2	DF	NED	Bo Vonk
3	DF	NED	Daniëlle Noordermeer
4	DF	NED	Cato Pijnacker Hordijk
5	DF	NED	Kayra Nelemans
6	DF	NED	Pleun Raaijmakers
7	MF	NED	Manon van Raay
8	MF	NED	Cheyenne van den Goorbergh
9	FW	NED	Lobke Loonen
10	MF	NED	Louise van Oosten
11	FW	ARU	Gina Viehoff

No.	Pos.	Nation	Player
14	MF	NED	Iris Remmers
15	DF	NED	Jill van den Ende
16	GK	NED	Isa Grimmius
18	MF	NED	Lauren Glotzbach
19	FW	NED	Victoria Boerboom
20	DF	NED	Jet van Mierlo
21	DF	NED	June Burgers
22	MF	NED	Annouk Boshuizen
23	MF	NED	Quinty Dupon
24	FW	NED	Anne van Egmond
35	MF	NED	Floortje den Bol

== Head coaches ==
- (Netherlands) Sandra van Tol (interim) (2025–present)
- (Netherlands) Marten Glotzbach (2024–2025)
- (Netherlands) Stephan Vos (2024)
- (Netherlands) Alex Scholte and Stephan Vos (2023–2024)
- (Netherlands) Sjaak Polak (2019–2023)
- (Netherlands) Arend Regeer (2016–2019)
- (Netherlands) Marcel Valk (2014–2016)
- (Netherlands) Sarina Wiegman (2007–2014)

== Broadcasting ==
As of the 2025–26 season, league matches are broadcast on ESPN in the Netherlands.

== Photo gallery ==
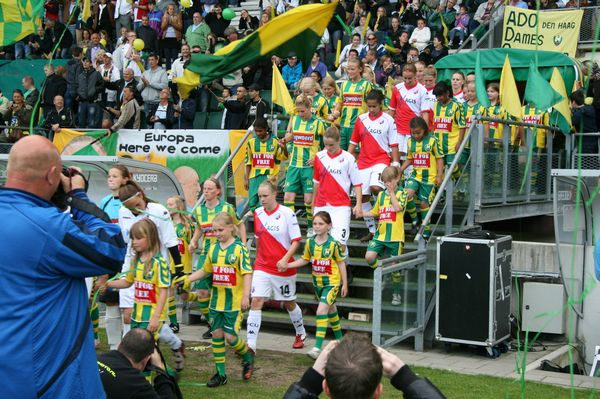
ADO 2011

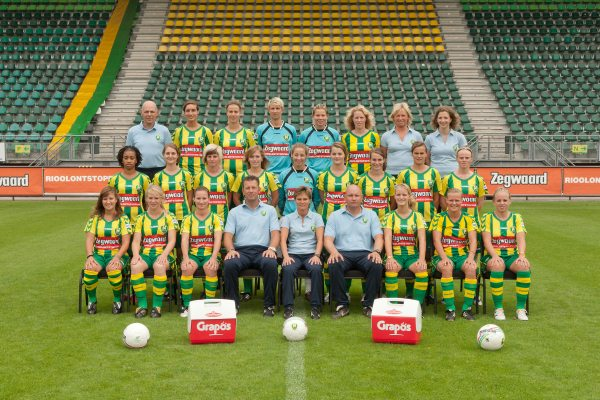
ADO squad 2010–2011

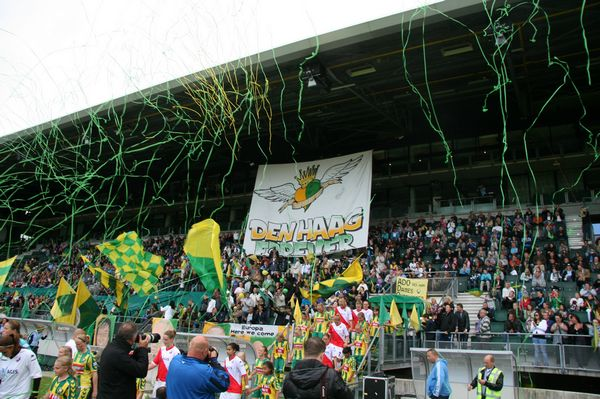
Supporters during match (June 5, 2011)

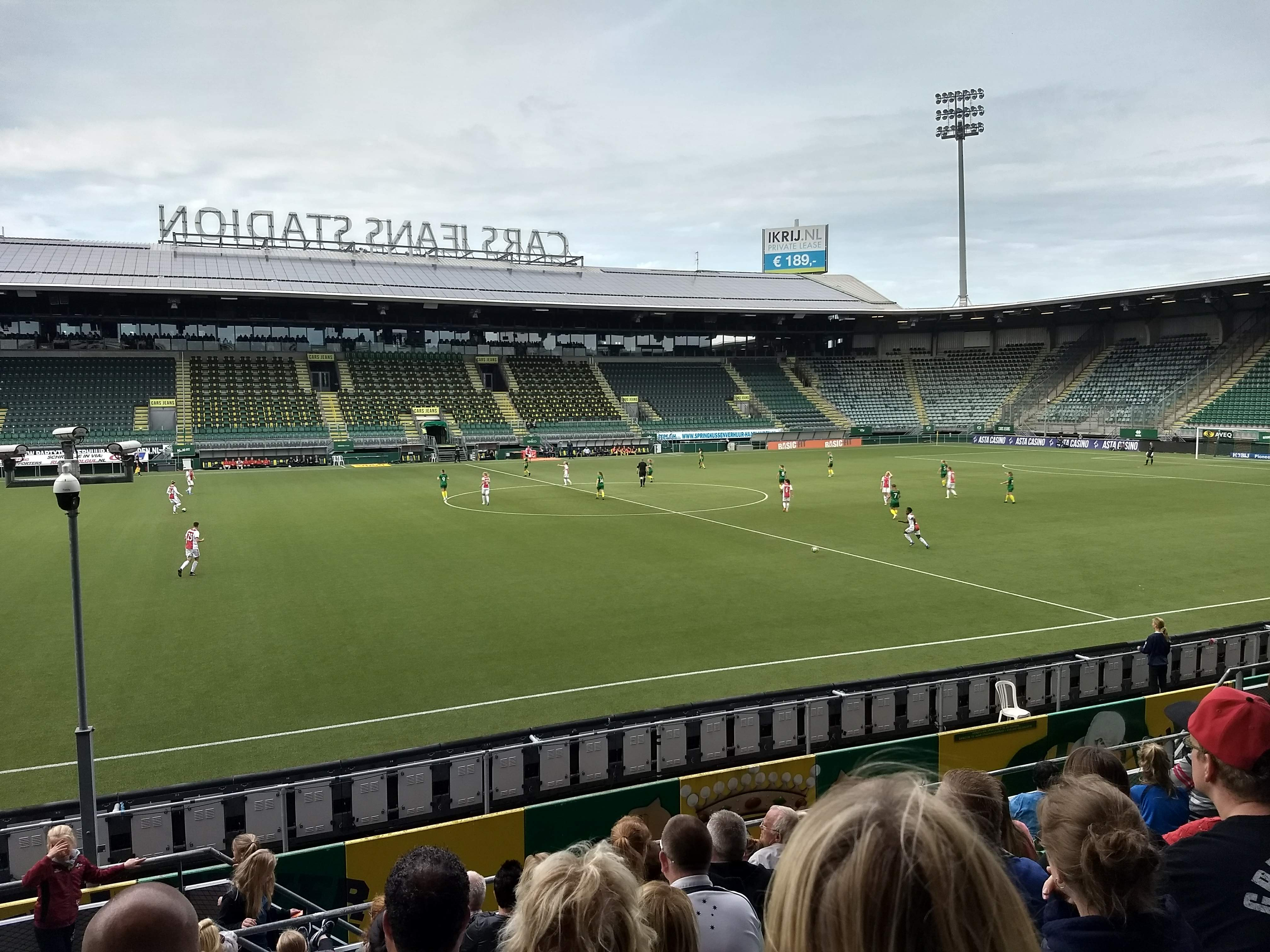
ADO–Ajax in 2018
