= AZ Alkmaar (women) =

Dutch women's association football club

Coordinates: 52°36′46″N 4°44′32″E

AZ
- Full name: Alkmaar Zaanstreek
- Short name: AZ
- Founded: 2007; 19 years ago
- Ground: AFAS Trainingcomplex; AFAS Stadion (select matches)
- Manager: Mark de Vries
- League: Azerion Vrouwen Eredivisie
- 2025–26: 8th
- Website: www.az.nl

AZ or AZ Vrouwen is a women's football club based in Alkmaar, the Netherlands. They were founding members of the Eredivisie Vrouwen in 2007 and won the league's first three championships. In February 2011, AZ announced they were withdrawing support for their women's club for financial reasons.

As AZ folded, Telstar fielded a team in the 2011–12 season, and most of the AZ players signed with the newly formed club. Telstar was replaced in the region by VV Alkmaar in 2017.

In January 2022, AZ announced they were exploring restarting a women's club. Two months later, AZ announced they were going to financially support and were working closely with VV Alkmaar. As AZ and VV Alkmaar intensified their collaboration in 2022, AZ took the place of VV Alkmaar in the Eredivisie starting in the 2023–24 season.

On 23 March 2023, Mark De Vries was named the team's manager. The club finished 9th out of 12 teams in its first year back in the Eredivisie.

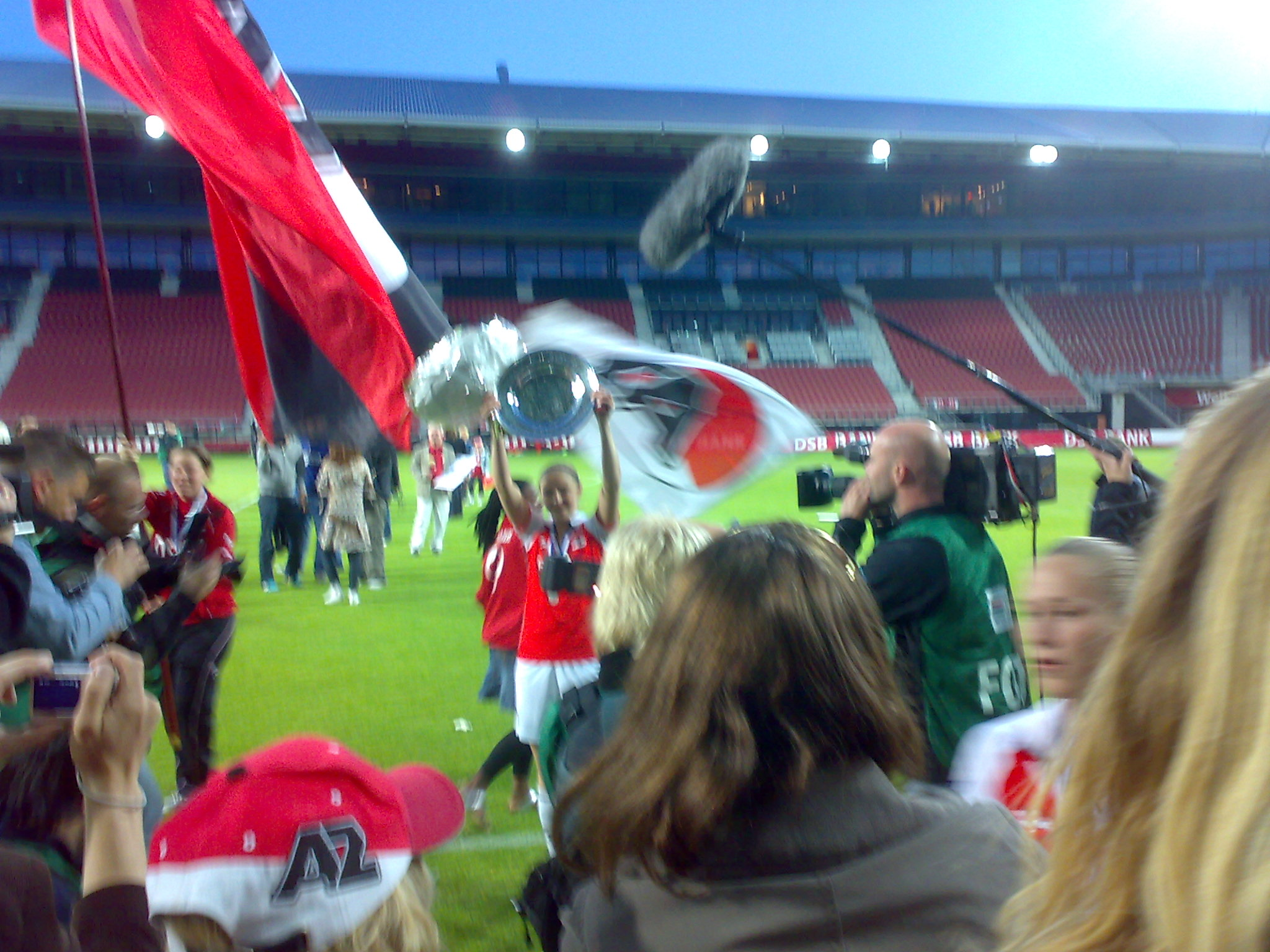
AZ women won the National champion first time in 2008

== Honours ==
National

- National champion
  - Winners (3): 2008, 2009, 2010
- KNVB Women's Cup
  - Winners (1): 2011

== Results Eredivisie ==
1	1	1	3	9
08	09	10	11	24
Eredivisie

Season	Division	Position	W – D – L = Pts	GF – GA	Top scorer	KNVB Cup
2007–08	Eredivisie	1 / 6	11 – 4 – 5 = 37	29 – 16	van den Heiligenberg (9)	Round of 32
2008–09	Eredivisie	1 / 7	15 – 4 – 5 = 49	45 – 16	van den Heiligenberg (11)	
2009–10	Eredivisie	1 / 6	12 – 5 – 3 = 41	32 – 11	de Ridder (11)	Quarterfinals
2010–11	Eredivisie	3 / 8	12 – 4 – 5 = 40	43 – 25	de Ridder (19)	Champions
2023–24	Eredivisie	9 / 12	5 – 6 – 11 = 21	28 – 38	Spaan (11)	Round of 16

== Players ==
As of 3 September 2024

Note: Flags indicate national team as defined under FIFA eligibility rules; some limited exceptions apply. Players may hold more than one non-FIFA nationality.

No.	Pos.	Nation	Player
3	DF	NED	Ginia Caprino
3	DF	NED	Djoeke de Ridder
4	DF	NED	Karlijn Woons
5	DF	NED	Camie Mol
6	MF	NED	Isa Colin
7	FW	NED	Veerle van der Most
8	MF	NED	Manique de Vette
9	FW	NED	Floor Spaan
10	MF	NED	Desiree van Lunteren
11	FW	NED	Fieke Kroese

No.	Pos.	Nation	Player
12	DF	NED	Robin Blom
14	MF	NED	Robin Blom
15	DF	NED	Bo op de Weegh
16	GK	NED	Netty Booms
17	DF	NED	Ilvy Zijp
18	FW	NED	Romaissa Boukaker
20	MF	NED	Mirte Van Bentum
21	MF	NED	Jasmijn van Uden
22	MF	NED	Kaelyn Thomas
23	DF	NED	Maudy Stoop

== European competition ==
Season	Cup	Round	Opponent	Home	Away	Agg (Note: or single match when home and away are empty)
2008-09	UEFA Women's Cup	1st qualifying round	(Scotland) Glasgow City LFC			1-1
2008-09	UEFA Women's Cup	1st qualifying round	(Moldova) FC Narta Chisinau			7-0
2008-09	UEFA Women's Cup	1st qualifying round	(Serbia) ŽFK Mašinac Niš			4-1
2009-10	Champions League	Round of 32	(Denmark) Brøndby	1-2	1-1	2-3
2010-11	Champions League	Round of 32	(France) Lyon	1-2	0-8	1-10
