= Lisanne Grimberg =

Dutch football player

Personal information
- Date of birth: 25 September 1992 (age 34)
- Place of birth: Wassenaar, Netherlands
- Position: Forward

Senior career*
Years	Team	Apps	(Gls)
2008–2012	ADO Den Haag	80	(38)

International career
2006–2007	Netherlands U15	3	(2)
2008	Netherlands U16	4	(3)
2007–2008	Netherlands U17	11	(9)
2009–2010	Netherlands U19	12	(5)
2010	Netherlands	1	(1)
- * Club domestic league appearances and goals

Lisanne Grimberg (born 25 September 1992) is a Dutch footballer who has played for ADO Den Haag. Grimberg has one cap for the Netherlands national team, scoring a goal in a victory over Ireland in a friendly.

== Honours ==
ADO Den Haag

- KNVB Cup : 2015-2016
