= Sportpark Schoonenberg =

Football stadium in the Netherlands

Sportpark Schoonenberg BUKO Stadion
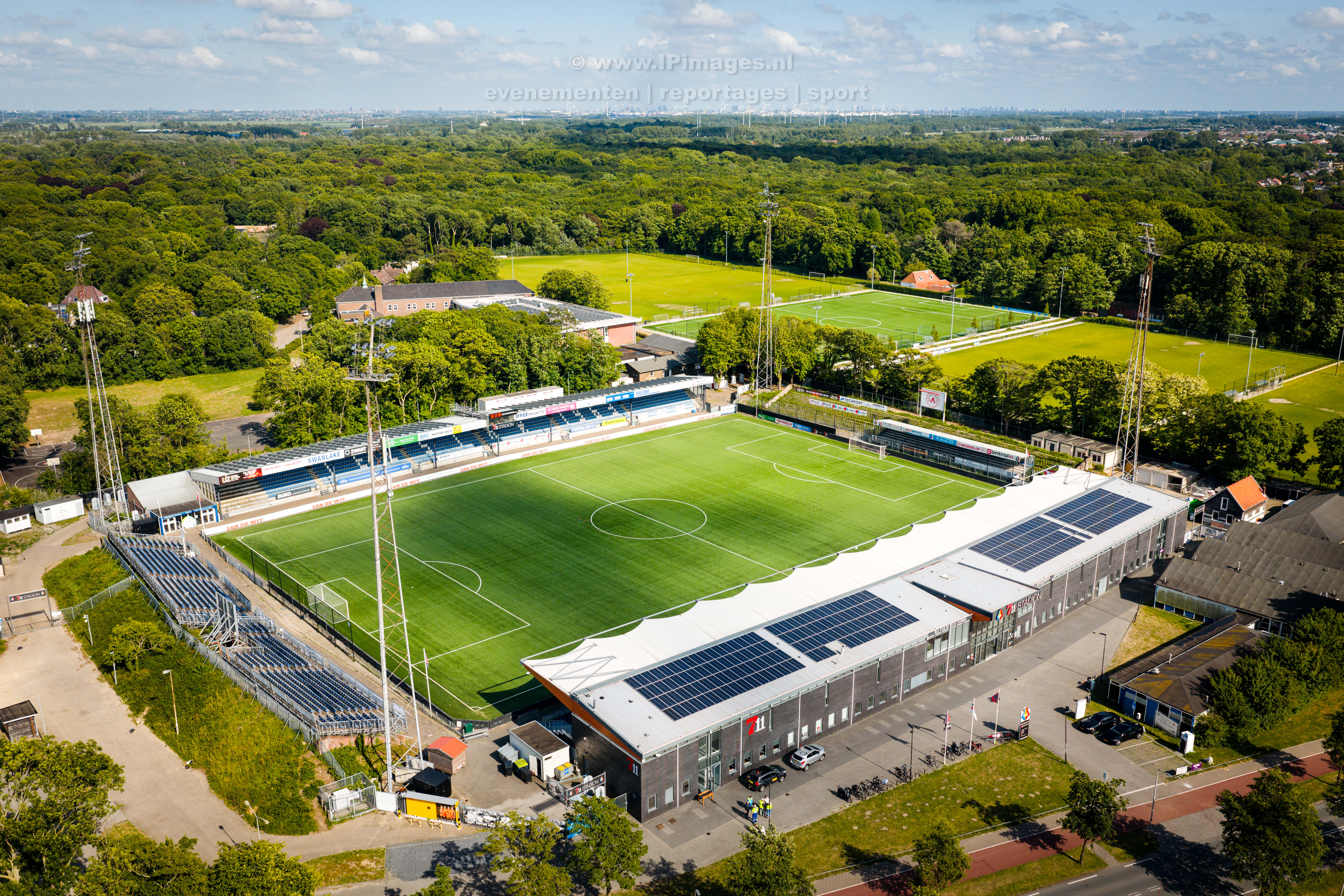
- Pictures taken from the air (2025)
- Interactive map of Sportpark Schoonenberg; BUKO Stadion
- Former names: Sportpark Schoonenberg (1948–present); TATA Steel Stadion (2009–2014); Telstar Stadion (2014–2016); Rabobank IJmond Stadion (2016–2020); BUKO Stadion (2021–2023, 2025–present); 711 Stadion (2023–2025)
- Location: Minister van Houtenlaan 123, 1981 EK Velsen-Zuid; Netherlands
- Coordinates: 52°27′18″N 4°38′06″E
- Capacity: 6,000
- Surface: grass

Tenants
- Telstar and Telstar women

Sportpark Schoonenberg (Dutch pronunciation: [ˈspɔrtpɑr(ə)k ˈsxoːnə(m)bɛr(ə)x]), branded as BUKO Stadion for sponsorship reasons, is the home of Eredivisie club Telstar and Eredivisie Vrouwen club Telstar. It is located in Velsen-Zuid, Netherlands. It was opened in 1948, with minor renovations in 1999 and additional renovations in 2009 and 2025.

The stadium, with a capacity of 6,000, consists of an all-seater east stand (converted from a standing-only in 1999), a 400-seater south stand (added in 2025), an all-seater north stand (2,000 capacity, added in 2025) and an all-seater west stand. The west stand was built in 2009 and has several built-in features, including new changing rooms, offices, and improved sponsor seating.

Beginning in January 2021, BUKO was the main sponsor of the football team, and the stadium was named BUKO Stadion. In June 2023, online casino 711 became the new sponsor of Telstar, and the stadium was renamed 711 Stadion. The BUKO Stadion name returned in June 2025, as new national regulations banned gambling sponsorships. That month, Telstar also began renovations to the stadium, including replacing artificial turf with natural grass, to meet Eredivisie requirements.
