= Roger Reijners =

Dutch football coach and former player

Personal information
- Full name: Roger Johannes Joseph Hubertus Reijners
- Date of birth: 10 February 1964 (age 62)
- Place of birth: Roermond, Netherlands
- Height: 1.72 m (5 ft 7 1/2 in)
- Position: Midfielder

Youth career
- Vv Victoria
- RKSVN

Senior career*
Years	Team	Apps	(Gls)
1983–1991	Fortuna Sittard	225	(16)
1991–1995	MVV	101	(3)
Total		326	(19)

International career
1984	Netherlands U21	4	(0)

Managerial career
- 2000–2003: MVV Maastricht
- 2003–2007: Fortuna Sittard (assistant)
- 2007–2010: Fortuna Sittard
- 2010–2015: Netherlands Women
- 2016: Myanmar Women
- 2018–2019: China Women U-17
- 2019–2020: MVV Maastricht (assistant)
- 2021–2022: VVV Venlo U-21
- 2022–2024: Fortuna Sittard Women
- * Club domestic league appearances and goals

Roger Reijners (born 10 February 1964) is a Dutch football coach and former player.

== Playing career ==
Reijners turned professional with Fortuna Sittard and played in the 1–0 KNVB Cup Final defeat to Feyenoord in his first season, 1983–84. He also won four caps for the Netherlands national under-21 football team in May 1984. After becoming an Eredivisie regular, he joined MVV in early in the 1991–92 season in an exchange for Huub Driessen.

== Coaching career ==
In 1995 Reijners retired from playing and moved on to the coaching staff at MVV. From 1995 to 2000, Reijners worked as an academy manager at MVV.

On 1 November 2010 he left his role as Fortuna Sittard manager to succeed Vera Pauw as coach of the Netherlands women's national football team.

On 20 June 2019, Reijners returned to MVV Maastricht as assistant manager of first team manager Fuat Usta.
