= List of Netherlands women's international footballers =

This is a list of the Netherlands women's association footballers who have played for the Netherlands women's national football team, since the first women's match recognised by FIFA worldwide in 1971 against France.

== Players ==
Bold names indicate players who are still active and available for the national team.

As of December 2020.

Debut date	Name	C	G	National team years	Club(s) while playing for national team	N / ref.
1 October 2007	Roos Kwakkenbos	3	0	2007–2008	FC Utrecht	
11 April 2023	**Wieke Kaptein**	4	0	2023–	Twente	
2 September 2022	**Fenna Kalma**	5	2	2022–	Twente, Wolfsburg	
9 February 2013	Jolijn Heuvels (nl)	1	0	2013	PEC Zwolle	
8 April 2022	**Damaris Egurrola**	21	3	2022–	Olympique Lyon	
16 February 2022	**Esmee Brugts**	22	6	2022–	PSV, Barcelona	
16 February 2022	**Romée Leuchter**	11	2	2022–	Ajax	
19 February 2022	**Kayleigh van Dooren**	4	0	2022–	Twente	
19 February 2022	**Daphne van Domselaar**	19	0	2022–	Twente, Aston Villa	
19 February 2022	**Chasity Grant**	1	0	2022–	Ajax	
29 November 2021	**Marisa Olislagers**	10	0	2021–	Twente	
29 November 2021	**Lisa Doorn**	4	0	2021–	Ajax	
29 November 2021	**Samantha van Diemen**	3	0	2021–	Feyenoord	
29 November 2021	**Caitlin Dijkstra**	13	1	2021–	Twente	
29 November 2021	**Janou Levels**	2	0	2021–	PSV	
29 November 2021	**Barbara Lorsheyd**	1	0	2021–	ADO Den Haag	
22 October 2021	**Kerstin Casparij**	27	0	2021–	Twente, Manchester City	
22 October 2021	**Jill Baijings**	8	0	2021–	SGS Essen	
9 August 1997	Daphne Koster	139	7	1997–2013	SVA Assendelft (nl), Ter Leede, AZ Alkmaar, Sky Blue, Telstar, Ajax	
14 October 2000	Dyanne Bito	146 (nl)	6	2000–2015	ASV Wartburgia (nl), Heike Rheine, ADO Den Haag, AZ Alkmaar, Telstar	
15 April 2003	Manoe Meulen	55	1	2003–2011	SV Braakhuizen(nl), SteDoCo, Willem II	
6 August 2004	Anouk Hoogendijk	103	9	2004–2017	Saestum, Utrecht, Bristol City, Ajax, Arsenal	
20 August 2005	Loes Geurts	125	0	2005–2020	Western Illinois Leathernecks, Heike Rheine, AZ Alkmaar, Telstar, Vittsjö, Kopparbergs/Göteborg, Paris Saint-Germain	(c),
31 August 2006	**Sherida Spitse**	221	44	2006–	Sneek, Heerenveen, Twente, LSK Kvinner, Vålerenga, Ajax	(c),
21 November 2009	Anouk Dekker	87	7	2009–2021	Twente, Montpellier	(c),
21 November 2009	Kika van Es	77	0	2009–2022	Willem II, VVV-Venlo, PSV, Achilles '29, Twente, Ajax, Everton	(c),
6 June 2010	Cynthia Beekhuis	5	0	2010	Heerenveen	(a),
15 December 2010	Daniëlle van de Donk	171	38	2010–2025	Willem II, VVV-Venlo, PSV/FC Eindhoven, Kopparbergs/Göteborg, Arsenal, Olympique Lyon	(a), (c),
15 December 2010	Mandy van den Berg	90	6	2010–2017	ADO Den Haag, Vittsjö, Liverpool, Reading	(c),
7 March 2011	Sari van Veenendaal	91	0	2011–2022	Twente, Arsenal, Atlético Madrid, PSV	(a), (c),
22 August 2011	Lieke Martens	160	62	2011–	Standard Liège, Duisburg, Kopparbergs/Göteborg, Rosengård, Barcelona, Paris Saint-Germain	(a), (c),
15 February 2012	Desiree van Lunteren	84	0	2012–2019	Telstar, Freiburg, Ajax	(a), (c),
8 March 2013	Stefanie van der Gragt	107	14	2013–	Telstar, Twente, Bayern Munich, Ajax, Barcelona, Inter Milan	(c),
26 September 2013	**Vivianne Miedema**	115	95	2013–	Heerenveen, Bayern Munich, Arsenal	(c),
5 March 2014	**Dominique Janssen**	102	6	2014–	Essen, Arsenal, Wolfsburg	(c),
5 April 2014	Eshly Bakker	14	3	2014–2017	Ajax, Twente	
7 February 2015	**Jill Roord**	92	25	2015–	Twente, Bayern Munich, Arsenal, Wolfsburg	(c),
7 February 2015	Merel van Dongen	63	2	2015–2022	Ajax, Real Betis, Atlético Madrid	(c),
17 September 2015	Danique Kerkdijk	18	0	2015–2020	Twente, Bristol City, Brighton & Hove Albion	
22 January 2016	**Jackie Groenen**	103	9	2016–	FFC Frankfurt, Manchester United, Paris Saint-Germain	(c),
19 January 2019	Inessa Kaagman	12	0	2019–2021	Everton, Brighton & Hove Albion	
4 March 2019	**Lize Kop**	7	0	2019–	Ajax, Leicester City	
4 March 2019	**Aniek Nouwen**	43	2	2019–	PSV, Chelsea, AC Milan	
4 March 2019	**Ashleigh Weerden**	3	0	2019–	Twente	
3 September 2019	**Lynn Wilms**	36	1	2019–	Twente, Wolfsburg	
14 June 2001	Marloes de Boer	60	4	2001–2009	Oranje Nassau, Be Quick '28, FC Twente	
21 February 2007	Marije Brummel	29	1	2007–2012	Be Quick '28, Twente, Heerenveen	
4 June 2016	Sheila van den Bulk	5	0	2016-2018	Djurgården	(c),
16 December 1998	Cindy Burger	57	3	1998-2004	KFC '71, Ter Leede	
13 July 2009	Angela Christ	17	0	2009-2017	Utrecht, PSV	(c),
20 August 2005	Jeanine van Dalen	10	0	2005-2010	RVVH, ADO Den Haag	
20 September 2000	Nicole Delies	47	10	2000-2006	Velocitas 1897, SV Saestum, CVV Oranje Nassau	
27 November 2002	Stefanie Dijkhuizen	7	0	2002-2003	Ter Leede	
6 March 2013	Kim Dolstra	3	0	2013-2014	Telstar, ADO Den Haag	
4 May 2008	Petra Dugardein	4	0	2008-2009	Willem II	
20 May 2015	Maran van Erp	1	0	2015	PSV	
16 February 2005	Nangila van Eyck	37	6	2005-2013	SV Saestum, ADO Den Haag, Heerenveen, Meppen	(a),
29 November 2016	**Sisca Folkertsma**	16	0	2016-	PSV, Twente, Bordeaux	(c),
11 April 1989	Nathalie Geeris	30	12	1989-2000	Ter Leede, Franklin Pierce Ravens, Boston Renegades	
3 March 2018	Cheyenne van den Goorbergh	1	1	2018	Twente	
28 February 2018	Esmee de Graaf	2	0	2018	PEC Zwolle	
7 September 2005	Claudia van den Heiligenberg	97	8	2005-2016	Ter Leede, AZ Alkmaar, Telstar, Ajax	(a),
15 February 2012	Maayke Heuver	17	2	2012-2015	Twente	(a),
6 August 2004	Petra Hogewoning	100	0	2004-2015	Ter Leede, FC Utrecht, Zvezda 2005 Perm, Sky Blue FC, FCR Duisburg, Ajax	
12 December 2010	Ellen Jansen	16	2	2010-2019	FC Twente, Ajax	
1 April 2010	Renate Jansen	72	8	2010-2024	ADO Den Haag, FC Twente	(c),
9 December 1995	Annemieke Kiesel	156	19	1995-2011	SV Saestum, Charlotte Lady Eagles, Bristol Academy, FCR 2001 Duisburg	
5 February 2006	Karin Legemate	22	0	2006-2009	Ter Leede, ADO Den Haag, AZ Alkmaar	
6 March 2015	Vanity Lewerissa	11	0	2015-2017	PSV	(c),
10 March 1997	Gilanne Louwaars	79	9	1997-2006	SV Saestum	
25 April 2004	Manon Melis	136	59	2004-2016	RVVH, Be Quick '28, FC Rosengård, Linköpings FC, Kopparbergs/Göteborg FC, Seattle Reign FC	
8 September 1996	Hanneke Mensink	49	3	1996-2003	SV Saestum	
15 February 2012	Tessel Middag	44	4	2012-2017	Ajax, Manchester City, West Ham United	(a),
11 March 1990	Liesbeth Migchelsen	97	7	1990-2007	SV Saestum, FFC Heike Rheine, S.V. Fortuna Wormerveer (nl), AZ Alkmaar	
19 October 2017	Myrthe Moorrees	1	0	2017	FC Twente	
20 August 2014	Liza van der Most	15	0	2014-2019	Ajax	(c),
6 March 2015	Kim Mourmans	2	0	2015	Standard Liège	
20 May 2015	Marthe Munsterman	2	0	2015-2016	FC Twente	
25 October 2008	Tessa Oudejans	17	0	2008-2012	FC Utrecht	(a),
22 September 1984	Vera Pauw	89	2	1984-1998	VSV Vreeswijk (nl), Modena FC, Puck Deventer, SV Saestum	(b),
20 January 2018	**Victoria Pelova**	45	4	2018-	ADO Den Haag, Ajax, Arsenal	
5 March 2009	Marlous Pieëte	51	8	2009-2018	Twente, Ajax, Western Sydney Wanderers	
19 March 1983	Hesterine de Reus	43	0	1983-1992	Rijsoord	
29 July 2007	Chantal de Ridder	46	10	2007-2013	AZ, Turbine Potsdam	
6 June 2010	Mirte Roelvink	7	0	2010-2013	FC Twente, FCR 2001 Duisburg, FF USV Jena, FSV Gütersloh 2009	
14 December 2008	Shanice van de Sanden	97	21	2008-2021	Utrecht, FC Twente, Liverpool, Olympique Lyonnais, Wolfsburg	(c),
5 March 2009	Renée Slegers	55	15	2009-2016	Willem II, Djurgårdens IF, Linköpings FC	
6 August 2004	Sylvia Smit	106	30	2004-2013	Oranje Nassau, Be Quick '28, FC Twente, SC Heerenveen, PEC Zwolle	
4 March 2020	**Joëlle Smits**	8	1	2020-	PSV, Wolfsburg	
8 November 2019	**Katja Snoeijs**	21	11	2019-	PSV, Bordeaux, Everton	
12 March 2009	Leonne Stentler	16	0	2009-2013	ADO Den Haag, Ajax	
31 August 2006	Karin Stevens	35	16	2006-2009	SC Jekerdal (nl), Willem II	
6 August 2004	Kirsten van de Ven	87	18	2004-2016	Quinnipiac Bobcats, Florida State Seminoles, Willem II Tilburg, Tyresö FF, FC Rosengård	
15 February 2012	Mandy Versteegt	6	0	2012-2014	Utrecht, Ajax	(a),
2 March 2018	Jennifer Vreugdenhil	1	0	2018	Valencia	
4 May 2008	Lianne de Vries	9	1	2008-2009	Amstelveen Heemraad (nl), Utrecht	
23 May 1987	Sarina Wiegman	99	3	1987-2001	HSV Celeritas (nl), KFC '71, North Carolina Tar Heels, ?, Ter Leede	(b,c),
11 April 1989	Marleen Wissink	141	0	1989-2006	Rheine, Puck Deventer, Eintracht Frankfurt (women)	
25 November 2012	Siri Worm	41	1	2012-2019	Twente, Everton, Tottenham Hotspur	
9 February 2013	Kelly Zeeman	24	0	2013-2018	Telstar, Ajax	(c),
4 October 2000	Hieke Zijlstra	10	2	2000-2003	Velocitas, Oranje Nassau,	
4 June 2016	**Lineth Beerensteyn**	94	26	2016-	ADO Den Haag, Twente, Bayern Munich, Juventus FC	(c),
16 February 2005	Miranda Loeff (nl)	3	0	2005		
9 February 2013	Priscilla de Vos	2	1	2013	Telstar	
18 February 2005	Chavelli Stolk (nl)	1	0	2005		
16 February 2005	Maaike Voerman	1	0	2005		
9 November 1973	Hanny van de Bungelaar	11	0	1973-1977	Bavos (nl)	
9 November 1973	Hennie Schlimbach-Smit	11	0	1973-1977	VV Kloosterhaar (nl)	
9 November 1973	Ellen Popeyus	22	0	1973-1980	DOSL (nl)	
9 November 1973	Marian Wellenberg	3	0	1973-1974	Puck Deventer	
9 November 1973	Truus Deen	1	0	1973	RKSV Rhode (nl)	
9 November 1973	Conny de Jong-Welgraven	13	1	1973-1978	GVC (nl)	
9 November 1973	Jos Andeweg-de Vroedt	14	0	1973-1978	VV GDC (nl)	
9 November 1973	Jo Fuchs	1	0	1973	VV VOS (nl)	
9 November 1973	José van Hoof	15	8	1973-1978	Bavos, SV Braakhuizen	(e)
9 November 1973	Tilly Asdonck-van Rooijen	7	3	1973-1976	Nijenrodes	
9 November 1973	Wilma van Elderen (nl)	3	0	1973-1974	SV Audacia (nl)	
9 November 1973	Hennie van Rooyen-Vernooij (nl)	10	0	1973	SV Houten (nl)	
9 November 1973	Tiny de Kort (nl)	5	0	1973-1975	Maurits (nl)	
9 November 1973	Hanneke van der Veen (nl)	3	0	1973-1974	Lycurgus (nl)	
11 May 1974	Siny van Sluijters (nl)	2	0	1974-1976		
11 May 1974	Bep Timmer (Timmer|nl)	45	9	1974-1988	RKTVC (nl)	
31 May 1974	Tiny Baay (Baay|nl)	1		1974		
31 May 1974	Anja ter Horst (nl)	2	0	1974		
26 October 1974	de Vloet	1	0	1974		
26 October 1974	Sophie Grenda (nl)	1	0	1974		
26 October 1974	Wil de Visser	30	12	1974-1984	KFC '71	
24 May 1975	Sylvia Genderen (nl)	3	0	1975-1976		
24 May 1975	Loltje van de Mossel (van de Mossel|nl)	7	3	1975-1977		
24 May 1975	Astrid Molenaar (nl)	4	0	1975-1977		
15 November 1975	Aukje Kuipers (nl)	7	1	1975-1978		
25 November 1975	Ria van Hassel (nl)	5	0	1975-1977		
2 May 1976	Christa Nannings (nl)	14	0	1976-1982	KFC	
25 September 1976	Els Schoon (nl)	13	2	1976-1982		
27 August 1977	Wil Siereveld (Siereveld|nl)	8	1	1977-1979		
15 October 1977	Tonnie Meijerink-van de Boom (nl)	8	0	1977-1979		
28 May 1978	Monique de Groot-Mars (nl)	4	0	1978-1980		
28 May 1978	Margaret van Dinten (nl)	9	0	1978-1979		
28 May 1978	Loes Camper	39	8	1978-1990	RKTVC	
30 May 1978	Elly Manuputty (nl)	4	2	1978		
30 May 1978	Edith Ramakers (nl)	16	0	1978		
30 September 1978	Sjoukje Leistra (nl)	2	0	1978-1979		
21 October 1978	Marian Vermeent (nl)	1	0	1978		
21 October 1978	Monique Vankan (nl)	1	0	1978		
21 July 1979	Marjoke de Bakker	61	29	1979-1991	KFC	
23 July 1979	Mary van de Heiligenberg-van der Meer (nl)	4	0	1979		
21 October 1978	Ria Vestjens	94	13	1978-1991	SV Braakhuizen	
21 July 1979	Ria de Jong-Desaunois (nl)	12	2	1979-1983		
15 September 1979	Stephanie Kalker (nl)	7	1	1979-1981		
15 September 1979	Willeke van Ruiten (nl)	2	0	1979		
29 September 1979	Margriet Leemhuis-Egberts (nl)	1	0	1979		
20 September 1980	Yvonne van de Laar (nl)	8	0	1980-1987		
20 September 1980	Carin te Brommelstroet (nl)	4	0	1980-1981		
20 September 1980	Marjan Middeldorp (nl)	2	0	1980		
20 September 1980	Sjaan Fortuin (nl)	11	1	1980-1983		
20 September 1980	Ellen van Eldik (nl)	2	2	1980	GVC	
25 April 1981	Ada Jansen-Weenink (nl)	4	0	1981-1982		
25 April 1981	Jolanda Lelieveld (nl)	4	0	1981		
19 September 1981	Maurise Baan (nl)	1	0	1981		
19 September 1981	Rita Stegerink-Egberts (nl)	5	0	1981-1989		
17 March 1982	Winniefred Polman-Tel (nl)	1	0	1982		
17 March 1982	Anja van Rooyen-Bonte (Anja van Rooyen-Bonte|nl)	15	0	1982-1989	KFC	
25 September 1982	Els Dings (nl)	18	0	1982-1987	SV Leveroy (nl)	
25 September 1982	Janny Timisela	63	12	1982-1997	RKTVC, Hammarby	
13 October 1982	Josephina Timisela (nl)	11	0	1982-1989	RKTVC	
23 April 1983	Els van den Hoek (nl)	22	0	1983-1988	VV Haastrecht (nl)	
23 April 1983	Annemiek de Haan (nl)	6	1	1983-1986		
22 September 1984	Joke Blanker (nl)	1	0	1984		
22 September 1984	Mary de Beer (nl)	3	0	1984-1985		
22 September 1984	Paula van Mullekom-Mostert (nl)	10	0	1984-1988	RVW (nl)	
21 November 1984	Jackie Boogerd (nl)	15	2	1984-1987	RVW	
16 March 1985	Jeanny Allott	12	8	1985-1987	KFC '71	(d),
16 March 1985	Wilma Herik (nl)	2	0	1985		
1 March 1986	Mary Vinken (nl)	1	0	1986		
1 March 1986	Christa Bouw (nl)	11	0	1986-1992		
30 August 1986	Helen Fernandes (nl)	1	0	1986		
19 November 1986	Marjan Veldhuizen (nl)	13	0	1986-1991	RKTVC	
23 May 1987	Josée Verhage (nl)	1	0	1987		
17 September 1987	Lies Kols (nl)	16	0	1987-1995	RKTVC	
17 September 1987	Tjitske Schuil (Schuil|nl)	4	0	1987	VV Nicator (nl)	
17 September 1987	Daniëlle de Winter (de Winter|nl)	12	2	1987-1989	DSVP (nl)	
1 June 1988	Regina Miltenburg (nl)	17	1	1988-1992		
3 June 1988	Jacqueline Zwarts (nl)	8	0	1988-1990		
3 June 1988	Angelique Bovee (nl)	1	0	1988	SV Venray	
1 June 1988	Jolanda Leemans (nl)	6	1	1988-1994	DVC Den Dungen (nl)	
1 October 1988	Thea van Erp (nl)	3	0	1988		
1 October 1988	Annet Smits (nl)	15	0	1988-1991		
5 November 1988	Nathali Hoogwerf	1	0	1988		
11 April 1989	Rianne van Dam (nl)	13	3	1989-1994		
11 April 1989	Marja Heerink (nl)	3	0	1989		
11 April 1989	Ditte van de Bor (nl)	3	0	1989		
3 October 1989	Jeannette Van Baarle (nl)	1	0	1989		
3 October 1989	Cynthia van der Vaart (nl)	1	1	1989		
3 October 1989	Marleen Molenaar	16	1	1989-1991	KFC	
3 October 1989	Margriet Limbeek (nl)	32	7	1989-1994		
3 October 1989	Patricia Keeldar (nl)	8	0	1989-1999		
18 November 1989	Christel Gevers (nl)	1	0	1989		
18 November 1989	Annemiek van Waarden (nl)	52	8	1989-1999		
11 March 1990	Marion van der Ploeg (nl)	23	3	1990-1992		
18 April 1990	Ellen van Waaijen (nl)	1	0	1990		
18 April 1990	Irene Bernsen (nl)	1	0	1990		
12 September 1990	Sandra Roos (nl)	26	7	1990-1997	Zwart-Wit '28	
12 September 1990	Shelly Amweg (nl)	11	0	1990-1993		
22 September 1990	Mildred Baal	9	1	1990-1992		
24 November 1990	Lidy Thomassen (nl)	3	0	1990-1991		
8 December 1990	Linda Schoonoord (nl)	22	0	1990-1994		
7 March 1991	Miranda Noom (nl)	74	16	1991-2002	KFC, Ter Leede	
11 September 1991	Sandra Keereweer (nl)	22	4	1991-1995	Zwart-Wit '28	
11 September 1991	Saskia van de Velde (nl)	11	2	1991-1992	Zwart-Wit '28	
12 June 1991	Jorina Bouman (nl)	2	0	1991		
8 March 1992	Sylvia Wild (nl)	3	0	1992		
17 March 1992	Simone Zandvliet (nl)	1	0	1992		
19 March 1992	Diane Hulst (nl)	5	0	1992-1993		
19 March 1992	Ingrid Klomp (nl)	21	0	1992-1996		
10 September 1992	Sandra van Tol (nl)	82	1	1992-2002	Zwart-Wit '28, SV Saestum	
10 October 1992	Miranda Verrips (nl)	3	0	1992-2007	FC Utrecht	
8 September 1993	Wanda Zegers (nl)	9	0	1993-1995		
8 September 1993	Carola van der Laan (nl)	10	0	1993-1995		
8 September 1993	Marie-Jose Olde Kalter (nl)	16	0	1993-1997		
8 September 1993	Nancy Lieshout (nl)	2	0	1993-1994		
16 April 1994	Alita Salomons (nl)	5	0	1994-1995		
16 April 1994	Judith Thijssen (nl)	3	0	1994-1995		
14 March 1995	Sabine van Eyk (nl)	26	4	1995-2000		
14 March 1995	Danielle Korbmacher (nl)	16	7	1995-1996		
14 March 1995	René Peerbooms (nl)	3	0	1995		
20 September 1995	Mary van Leeuwen (nl)	1	0	1995		
20 September 1995	Sandra Doreleijers (nl)	9	0	1995-1997		
7 October 1995	Manon Derksen (nl)	4	0	1995-1996		
7 October 1995	Janita Davidse (nl)	10	1	1995-1997		
9 December 1995	Hanneke Wiegers (nl)	4	0	1995-1996		
6 March 1996	Jacoba Burggraaf (nl)	2		1996		
6 March 1996	Carool Maessen (nl)	1	0	1996		
18 May 1996	Ellen van Bergen (nl)	11	1	1996-2003		
5 June 1996	Anoeska Huijbrechts (nl)	1	0	1996		
27 August 1996	Willemijn Lodder (nl)	43	0	1996-2001		
27 August 1996	Jeanet van der Laan	25	0	1996-2003	Ter Leede	
10 March 1997	Minke v.d Waals (nl)	21	0	1997-1999		
10 March 1997	Sandra Muller	56	9	1997-2006	Zwart-Wit '28	
6 June 1997	Lisette Koning (nl)	8	0	1997-1998		
6 June 1997	Ilse Nieuwenhuis (nl)	3	0	1997		
11 June 1997	Jessica Torny	62	14	1997-2008	Puck Deventer, Heike Rheine, SV Fortuna Wormerveer (nl), Twente, Willem II	
27 August 1997	Shirley Smith	56	7	1997-2006	Zwart-Wit '28, EBOH, SV Saestum	
20 September 1995	Janine Poelman (nl)	2	0	1995-1997		
15 March 1998	Brigitte Schmitt (nl)	1	0	1998		
17 March 1998	Truus Leenman (nl)	2	0	1998		
1 April 1999	Lisan Goudena	23	0	1999-2004		
11 April 1999	Martine van Pelt (nl)	25	0	1999-2004		
1 February 2000	Joyce Overkleeft (nl)	2	0	2000-2002		
1 February 2000	Monique van Veen (nl)	17	4	2000-2004	SV Fortuna Wormerveer (nl)	
11 August 2000	Jolanda Aalbers (nl)	1	0	2000		
20 September 2000	Lonneke Robben-van der Wegen (nl)	7	0	2000-2001		
13 August 2001	Lisette Tromp (nl)	12	1	2001-2003		
4 November 2001	Marloes Eijben (nl)	2	0	2001		
4 November 2001	Ilona Stouthamer (nl)	2	0	2001		
13 February 2002	Ran (nl)	21	3	2002-2004		
26 September 2001	Hannah van Malenstein (nl)	2	0	2001-2002		
16 August 2002	Yvonne Veerman (nl)	1	0	2002		
27 November 2002	Janneke Bijl (nl)	4	0	2002-2005	SV Saestum	
27 November 2002	Esther Scheenaard (nl)	24	0	2002-2006	RKAVV	
25 February 2003	Jody Poldervaart (nl)	3	0	2003-2004		
25 February 2003	Gerda Edelman (nl)	2	0	2003		
26 March 2003	Desiree Post (nl)	4	0	2003-2004		
10 June 2003	Jorike Olde Loohuis (nl)	2	0	2003-2004		
1 October 2003	Iwan Witteman (nl)	7	0	2003-2004		
22 November 2003	Natasja van Ingen (nl)	6	0	2003-2004		
17 February 2004	Dennis van Zoghel (nl)	2	0	2004		
6 August 2004	Laura van Leeuwen	1	0	2004		
6 August 2004	Marjan Brouwer (nl)	9	0	2004-2005		
6 August 2004	Koehler (nl)	1	0	2004		
6 August 2004	Renee de Vries (nl)	2	0	2004	SV Saestum	
18 February 2004	Lisanne Vermeulen (nl)	2	0	2004		
7 September 2005	Dionne Demarteau (nl)	16	1	2005-2006	SV Fortuna Wormerveer (nl)	
29 October 2005	Dominique Vugts (nl)	3	0	2005-2008	SteDoCo, Willem II Tilburg	
12 April 2006	Latoya Mitchell (nl)	1	0	2006		
24 September 2006	Linda Bos (nl)	4	0	2006-2007	SV Fortuna Wormerveer (nl)	
29 October 2006	Jennifer Voss (nl)	3	0	2006	FFC Heike Rheine	
26 August 2007	Atty Eelkema	2	0	2007-2008		
7 March 2009	Sylvia Nooij	6	0	2009-2012	ADO Den Haag	
13 July 2009	Sandra Swinkels	1	0	2009	Roda JC	
15 August 2010	Lisanne Grimberg	1	1	2010	ADO Den Haag	
10 April 2016	Jeslynn Kuijpers	5	0	2016-2017	PSV	

correct as of 31 June 2022
a: + 1 cap in international match not officially recognised.
b: Also coached the national team.
c: member of the squad that won UEFA Women's Euro 2017.
d: Allott played internationally for England as well.
e: She also played in the first FIFA recognised (but not recognised by the Dutch FA) international women's match for the Netherlands
