= Liesbeth Migchelsen =

Dutch footballer (1971–2020)

Personal information
- Full name: Liesbeth Migchelsen
- Date of birth: 11 March 1971
- Place of birth: Harderwijk, Netherlands
- Date of death: 27 May 2020 (aged 49)
- Place of death: Harderwijk, Netherlands
- Height: 1.80 m (5 ft 11 in)
- Position: Defender

Youth career
- VVOG
- Puck Deventer

Senior career*
Years	Team	Apps	(Gls)
–2000	SV Saestum	0	(0)
2000–2005	FFC Heike Rheine	95	(4)
2005–2007	S.V. Fortuna Wormerveer	0	(0)
2007–2009	AZ Alkmaar	41	(8)

International career
1990–2008	Netherlands	97	(7)

Managerial career
- 2013–2014: Canberra United
- * Club domestic league appearances and goals

Liesbeth Migchelsen (11 March 1971 – 27 May 2020) was a Dutch footballer who represented the Netherlands women's national team 95 times between 1990 and 2008. She was the sister of former footballer Theo Migchelsen.

Migchelsen played in Germany for FFC Heike Rheine and in The Netherlands for S.V. Fortuna Wormerveer and AZ Alkmaar.

She was previously the Assistant Manager of the Netherlands Girls under-19 team, as well as Head Coach at a number of club sides prior to being appointed the Head Coach of the Australian W-League team Canberra United from 2013 to 2014. Under her management, Canberra United won the 2013-14 Premiership, and the 2014 Championship.

At the age of 49 after a short battle with cancer, she died on 27 May 2020 in her home country the Netherlands, surrounded by her loved ones and her dog Marró.

== International goals ==
Scores and results list the Netherlands goal tally first.

Goal	Date	Venue	Opponent	Score	Result	Competition
1.	9 December 1995	Stade de la Mosson, Montpellier, France	France	1–1	1–1	1997 UEFA Women's Euro qualification
2.	14 March 1997	Monte Choro (Albufeira), Portugal	Portugal	1–0	1–0	1997 Algarve Cup
3.	16 March 1997	Faro, Portugal	Finland	1–0	1–0	1997 Algarve Cup
4.	15 March 1998	Estádio Municipal, Vila Real de Santo António, Portugal	Portugal	2–1	2–1	1998 Algarve Cup
5.	2 April 1998	Friedrich-Ludwig-Jahn-Stadion, Herford, Germany	Germany	1–0	1–2	1999 FIFA Women's World Cup qualification
6.	1 February 2000	Centre of Excellence, Johannesburg, South Africa	South Africa	1–0	2–0	Friendly
7.	16 March 2000	Sportpark De Bakenberg, Arnhem, Netherlands	Germany	2–0	2–0	Friendly

== Honours ==
SV Saestum

- Dutch Championship (1): 1999–00

SV Fortuna Wormerveer

- Dutch Cup (1): 2005–06

AZ Alkmaar

- Eredivisie (2): 2007–08 and 2008–09
