= Marije Brummel =

Dutch football defensive midfielder

Personal information
- Full name: Marije Brummel
- Date of birth: 19 March 1985 (age 41)
- Place of birth: Zwolle, Netherlands
- Positions: Defender; midfielder

Senior career*
Years	Team	Apps	(Gls)
2000–2004	Klarenbeek		
2004–2006	Saestum		
2006–2007	Be Quick '28		
2007–2008	Twente	20	(1)
2008–2012	Heerenveen	81	(2)
2012–2013	PSV	9	(0)
2013–2014	PEC Zwolle	27	(5)
2014–2015	Apollon Limassol FC		
2015–2016	Bristol Academy	5	(0)
2016–2019	Sandviken	73	(5)
2020	Arna-Bjørnar	18	(0)

International career^{‡}
2007–2012	Netherlands	29	(1)

Managerial career
- 2020–2021: Fana IL
- 2021–: PSV (assistant)
- * Club domestic league appearances and goals as of 8 December 2020 ‡ National team caps and goals as of 8 December 2020

Marije Brummel (born 19 March 1985) is a Dutch football coach and former defensive midfielder. She started playing top-level football at SC Klarenbeek, continuing with SV Saestum and Be Quick '28 in the old Hoofdklasse; and FC twente, Heerenveen, PSV, and PEC Zwolle in the women's Eredivisie and BeNe League. After that she moved abroad to play in Cyprus, England and Norway. She also played European football with Saestum and Apollon.

She was a member of the Dutch national team from 2007 until 2012 when she lost her place, taking part in the 2009 European Championship.

== Career ==
=== Heerenveen ===
Brummel scored her first league goal against Willem II on 15 March 2010, scoring in the 46th minute.

=== PSV ===
Brummel made her league debut against Anderlecht on 16 March 2013.

=== PEC Zwolle ===
Brummel made her league debut against Lierse on 30 August 2013. She scored her first league goal against Royal Antwerp on 5 November 2013, scoring in the 71st minute.

=== Bristol City ===
Brummel made her league debut against Sunderland on 25 July 2015.

=== Sandviken ===
Brummel made her league debut against Arna-Bjørnar on 28 March 2016. She scored her first goal against Rosenborg BK Kvinner on 20 August 2016, scoring in the 18th minute.

=== Arna-Bjørnar ===
Brummel made her league debut against Røa IL on 4 July 2020.

== International career ==
Brummel returned to the national team in 2013 as part of a training group.

== Coaching career ==
In December 2020 at the end of the Norwegian football season she retired as a player, taking up a position as head coach of the Fana IL's women's team.

On 7 July 2021, it was announced that Brummel joined PSV women as an assistant coach.

== International goals ==
Scores and results list the Netherlands goal tally first.

Goal	Date	Venue	Opponent	Score	Result	Competition
1.	8 August 2009	Koning Willem II Stadion, Tilburg, Netherlands	Poland	2–0	2–0	Friendly
