= Marloes de Boer =

Dutch footballer

Personal information
- Full name: Marloes de Boer
- Date of birth: 30 January 1982 (age 44)
- Place of birth: Den Ham, Netherlands
- Position: Defender

Senior career*
Years	Team	Apps	(Gls)
2001–2005	Oranje Nassau		
2005–2007	Be Quick '28		
2007–2011	FC Twente	38	(3)

International career
2001–2009	Netherlands	60	(4)
- * Club domestic league appearances and goals

Marloes de Boer (born 30 January 1982) is a former Dutch football defender. Throughout her career she played for Oranje Nassau, Be Quick '28 and FC Twente in the Dutch league. She retired in 2011, after winning the league with Twente. de Boer was the first captain of FC Twente.

She played for the Dutch national team, making her debut against Czech Republic on 14 June 2001 and played a total of 60 matches including her last appearance against England on 6 September 2009 at the semifinal match of the 2009 European Championship.

== International goals ==
Scores and results list the Netherlands goal tally first.

Goal	Date	Venue	Opponent	Score	Result	Competition
1.	27 November 2002	Sportpark Rijsoord, Ridderkerk, Netherlands	Belgium	1–0	4–0	Friendly
2.	22 November 2003	Jan Louwers Stadion, Eindhoven, Netherlands	Belgium	2–0	3–0	2005 UEFA Women's Euro qualification
3.	24 September 2005	Jean-Bouin Stadium, Angers, France	France	1–0	1–0	2007 FIFA Women's World Cup qualification
4.	22 November 2006	Mitsubishi Forklift Stadion, Almere, Netherlands	Russia	2–0	5–0	Friendly

== Honours ==
- Dutch league (1): 2010–11
- Dutch cup (2): 2005, 2008
