= Shirley Kocaçınar =

Turkish-Dutch footballer

Personal information
- Full name: Shirley Hubertina Maria Adriana Kocaçınar
- Date of birth: December 4, 1986 (age 39)
- Place of birth: Heerlen, Netherlands
- Position: Forward

Team information
- Current team: Fortuna Sittard

Youth career
- –2007: Reuver VV

Senior career*
Years	Team	Apps	(Gls)
2007–2008	Willem II		
2008–2009	Roda JC	11	(4)
2009–2010	RKTSV Kerkrade	9	(0)
2010	Venray	1	(1)
2010–2011	VVV-Venlo	13	(2)
2011–2012	RKTSV Kerkrade	12	(15)
2012–	Fortuna Sittard	7	(10)

International career^{‡}
2011	Turkey	4	(2)
- * Club domestic league appearances and goals as of April 23, 2013 ‡ National team caps and goals as of October 21, 2011

Shirley Hubertina Maria Adriana Kocaçınar (born 4 December 1986) is a footballer who plays as a forward, currently playing for Fortuna Sittard. Born in the Netherlands, she represented Turkey at international level, making her debut in 2011.

== Playing career ==
=== Club ===
Kocaçınar played in the first season of the BeNe League, Premier Women's League, at Willem II. After one year, she moved to Roda JC, where she scored four goals in eleven league games. As her club folded due to financial problems, she transferred to RKTSV Kerkrade in the 2009–10 season. She returned to the Premier League with VVV-Venlo in the 2010–11 season. After the termination of her contract, she returned to her former club RKTSV Kerkrade, where she scored 15 goals in 12 matches becoming topscorer. In the 2012–13 season, Kocaçınar transferred to Fortuna Sittard.

In January 2013, she tried to transfer to the Turkish team Trabzon İdmanocağı without success due to problems with documentation.

Kocaçınar plays also futsal for the Sittard-based club FSG Gezien.nl.

=== International ===
In the possession of a Turkish passport, she was called up to the Turkey team. She took part in friendly international matches in 2011. In the match against Greece on April 29, 2011, she scored two goals. She capped four times for the Turkey women's national team.

== Honours ==
=== Individual ===
- Top scorer 2011–12 season with RKTSV Kerkrade

== See also ==
- Turkish women in sports
