= Lianne de Vries =

Dutch midfielder (born 1990)

Personal information
- Full name: Elisabeth Anne de Vries
- Date of birth: 28 June 1990 (age 36)
- Place of birth: Amstelveen, Netherlands
- Position: Midfielder

Senior career*
Years	Team	Apps	(Gls)
- Heemraad
2009–2011	FC Utrecht	28	(0)
2011–2013	PEC Zwolle	33	(2)
2013–2016	SC Heerenveen	66	(3)
2016	Urædd	6	(0)
2022	Saestum		

International career
2008–2016	Netherlands	9	(1)
- * Club domestic league appearances and goals as of 13:01, 1 July 2024

Elisabeth Anne de Vries (born 28 June 1990) is a Dutch former midfielder. She has played for SC Heerenveen, FC Utrecht and PEC Zwolle.

== Career ==
=== Utrecht ===
de Vries made her league debut against Willem II on 1 October 2009.

=== PEC Zwolle ===
de Vries made her league debut against ADO Den Haag on 2 September 2011. She scored her first league goal against Club Brugge on 23 March 2013, scoring in the 88th minute.

=== Heerenveen ===
de Vries made her league debut against PSV on 30 August 2013. She scored her first league goal against OH Leuven on 28 February 2014, scoring in the 33rd minute.

=== Urædd ===
de Vries made her league debut against Medkila IL on 24 September 2016.

=== Saestum ===
de Vries played in the KNVB Women's Cup against ADO Den Haag on 29 January 2022.

== International career ==
de Vries made her international debut against China on 4 May 2008. She scored her first international goal against South Africa on 13 July 2009, scoring in the 45th minute.

She has been a member of the Dutch national team, taking part in the 2009 European Championship.

== International goals ==
Scores and results list the Netherlands goal tally first.

Goal	Date	Venue	Opponent	Score	Result	Competition
1.	13 July 2009	Olympic Stadium, Amsterdam, Netherlands	South Africa	2–1	3–2	Four Nations Cup
