= Karin Legemate =

Dutch footballer

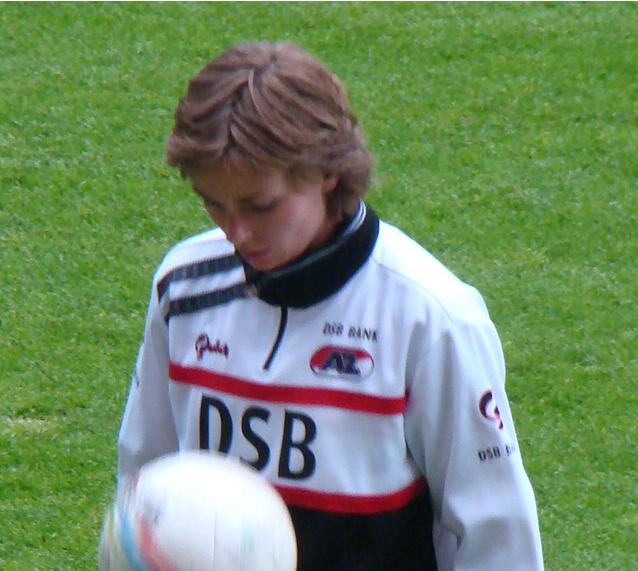

Personal information
- Full name: Katarina Johanna Agatha Legemate
- Date of birth: 6 November 1983 (age 43)
- Place of birth: Roelofarendsveen
- Height: 1.67 m (5 ft 6 in)
- Position: Midfielder

Senior career*
Years	Team	Apps	(Gls)
- Alkmania
2002–2007	Ter Leede		
2007–2009	ADO Den Haag		
2009–2011	AZ	41	(2)

International career
2006–2009	Netherlands	22	(0)
- * Club domestic league appearances and goals

Katarina Johanna Agatha Legemate is a Dutch former football midfielder. Throughout her career she played for Ter Leede in the pre-2007 Hoofdklasse and ADO Den Haag and AZ in the Eredivisie. She retired in 2011 following AZ's disbandment.

She was a member of the Dutch national team and played 22 matches between her debut on 5 February 2006 against Finland and her last match on 8 August 2009 against Poland.

== Titles ==
- 4 Dutch Leagues (2003, 2004, 2007, 2010)
- 2 Dutch Cups (2007, 2011)
- 2 Dutch Supercups (2004, 2007)
