= Jessica Torny =

Dutch football coach and player

Janna Torny
Personal information
- Date of birth: 30 September 1980 (age 46)
- Place of birth: Vriezenveen, Netherlands
- Position: Forward

Team information
- Current team: Sparta Prague (manager)

Senior career*
| Years | Team | Apps | (Gls) |
- Puck Deventer
| 2000–2006 | FFC Heike Rheine | 71 | (33) |
| 2006–2007 | S.V. Fortuna Wormerveer | | |
| 2007–2008 | FC Twente | | |
| 2008–2009 | Willem II | 18 | (4) |

International career
| 1997–2009 | Netherlands | 62 | (14) |

Managerial career
- 2012–2015: SC Heerenveen
- 2015–2021: Netherlands U19
- 2021–2022: Netherlands (assistant)
- 2022–2026: Feyenoord
- 2026–: Sparta Prague
- * Club domestic league appearances and goals

Janna "Jessica" Torny (born 30 September 1980) is a Dutch football coach and former footballer, who is currently the head coach of the Sparta Prague's women's team. As a player, she made 62 appearances for the Netherlands women's national football team.

== Playing career ==
=== Club ===
In 2000, at the age of 20, Torny joined German Frauen-Bundesliga club FFC Heike Rheine. She had been playing for Puck Deventer but wanted to experience a higher level of football in Germany. She played for Heike Rheine until 2006, when she joined Dutch team S.V. Fortuna Wormerveer. In 2007, Torny joined FC Twente, with whom she won the 2007–08 KNVB Women's Cup. In 2008, she joined Willem II.

=== International ===
At international level, Torny made 62 appearances for the Netherlands women's national football team, scoring 14 goals. She made her senior debut in a 0–0 home draw with Sweden on 11 June 1997. In total, she made 75 appearances including for youth teams, between 1996 and 2009. Torny announced her retirement from football in 2009.

== Coaching career ==
After retiring, Torny worked as a coach for the Dutch under-15 women's team from 2009 until 2012. In 2012, she became head coach of SC Heerenveen, and was head coach there until 2015. In August 2014, Torny was announced as an assistant coach of the Netherlands women's national under-19 football team. She continued to manage Heerenveen.

In 2015, she became head coach of Netherlands women under-19s. During her tenure, the team reached the semi-finals of the 2017 and 2019 UEFA Women's Under-19 Championships. In May 2019, Torny began studying for a UEFA Pro Licence. She benefitted from a change in the Royal Dutch Football Association's rules that allowed women's footballers who had played more than 40 matches for the national team to get a UEFA A Licence without needing to get lower level licences beforehand. In 2020, Torny obtained her UEFA Pro Licence, making her the fourth Dutch women to have the qualification.

In 2021, Torny was announced as an assistant coach of the Netherlands women's senior team, under new head coach Mark Parsons. Torny had been considered a favourite to succeed Sarina Wiegman as head coach.

In December 2022, Feyenoord announced that Torny had joined the club as the new head coach of the club's women's team. She signed a contract for a season and a half with an option for an additional season.

On 24 September 2026, Torny was appointed as the manager of Czech Women's First League club Sparta Prague.

== Personal life ==
Torny is from Vriezenveen, Netherlands.
