= Vanity Lewerissa =

Retired Dutch footballer (born 1991)

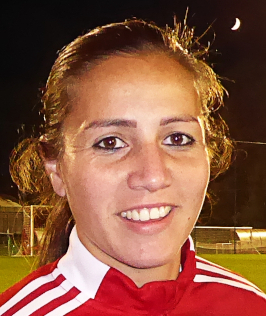
- Lewerissa in 2021

Personal information
- Full name: Vanity Tonja Caroll Lewerissa
- Date of birth: 1 April 1991 (age 35)
- Place of birth: Maastricht, Netherlands
- Height: 1.60 m (5 ft 3 in)
- Position: Midfielder

Senior career*
Years	Team	Apps	(Gls)
- RVVH
2010–2011	VVV-Venlo	18	(6)
2011–2015	Standard Liège	59	(41)
2015–2018	PSV	52	(34)
2018–2021	Ajax	38	(13)
2021–2024	Standard Liège	29	(6)

International career
2006	Netherlands U15	2	(0)
2006–2008	Netherlands U17	20	(7)
2007–2010	Netherlands U19	20	(11)
2015–2017	Netherlands	11	(0)
Medal record
Women's football
Representing the Netherlands
UEFA Women's Championship
Gold medal – first place	2017 Netherlands	Team
- * Club domestic league appearances and goals as of 00:08, 12 June 2024 (UTC)

Vanity Tonja Caroll Lewerissa (born 1 April 1991) is a Dutch former football midfielder. She previously played in the Belgian 1st Division for Standard Liège, with whom she has also played in the Champions League and BeNe League. She played for three Dutch Eredivisie clubs, VVV-Venlo, PSV, and AFC Ajax.

== Playing career ==
=== VVV-Venlo ===
Lewerissa made her league debut against Heerenveen on 2 September 2010. She scored her first league goals against Willem II on 21 October 2010, scoring a brace in the 23rd and 43rd minute.

=== First spell at Standard Liège ===
Lewerissa scored on her league debut against Zulte Waregem on 25 August 2012, scoring in the 47th minute. She scored a hattrick against K.A.A Gent on 29 November 2013. Lewerissa scored a hat trick against OH Leuven on 24 February 2015.

=== PSV ===
On 30 July 2015, Lewerissa was announced at PSV. She scored on her league debut against PEC Zwolle on 21 August 2015, scoring in the 68th minute. She scored four goals against VV Alkmaar on 16 October 2015. She was the top goal scorer in each of her three seasons with PSV, scoring at least 10 goals per season and 34 goals total in the Eredivisie with the Eindhoven club.

=== AFC Ajax ===
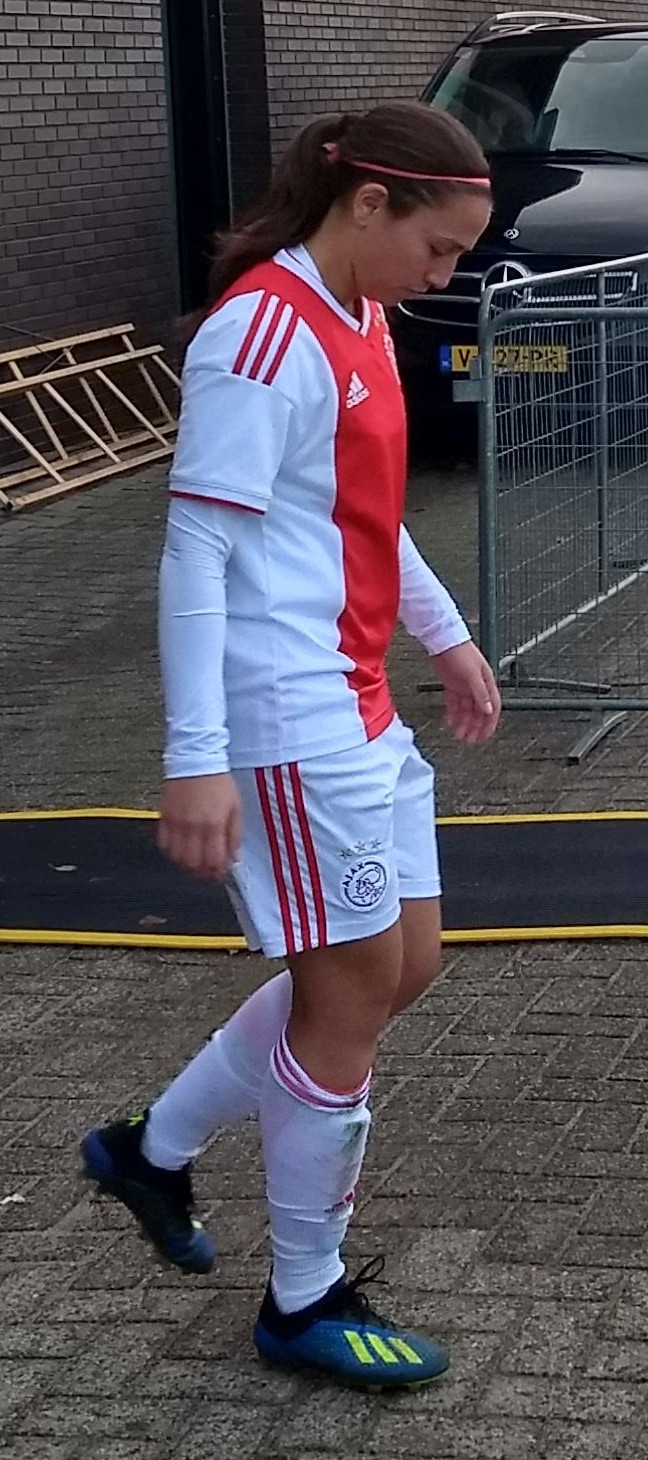
Lewerissa with Ajax in 2018

Lewerissa made her Ajax league debut against PEC Zwolle on 7 September 2018. She scored her first league goal against VV Alkmaar on 30 September 2018, scoring in the 78th minute. Lewerissa scored two goals for Ajax in her final game.

Lewerissa initially announced her retirement but changed her mind and re-signed with Standard Liège.

=== Second spell at Standard Liège ===
In February 2022, Lewerissa was diagnosed with breast cancer. In August 2022, she announced she was cancer-free. Her final club match with Liège was a 5–1 win over Club Brugge on 25 May 2024.

On 29 May 2024, Lewerissa announced her retirement.

== International career ==
As a junior, she played in the 2010 U-19 European Championship. She made her debut in the senior Netherlands women's national football team on 6 March 2015 in a match against Finland. She was part of the squad at the 2015 FIFA Women's World Cup.

Lewerissa was on the Dutch team that won the UEFA Women's Euro 2017. She played in one match, coming on in the 86th minute in a group stage victory over Belgium. After the 2017 tournament, the entire team was honoured by the Prime Minister Mark Rutte and Minister of Sport Edith Schippers and made Knights of the Order of Orange-Nassau.

On January 12, 2018, Lewerissa announced her retirement from the national team.

== Coaching career ==
Before her retirement from playing, Lewerissa began coaching the girl's youth team of MVV and Fortuna Sittard. In July 2024, she was named the coach of the reserve team for Fortuna Sittard's women's team.

== Honours ==
Netherlands

- UEFA Women's Euro (1): 2017

Individual

- Knight of the Order of Orange-Nassau: 2017
