= Anouk Hoogendijk =

Dutch footballer (born 1985)

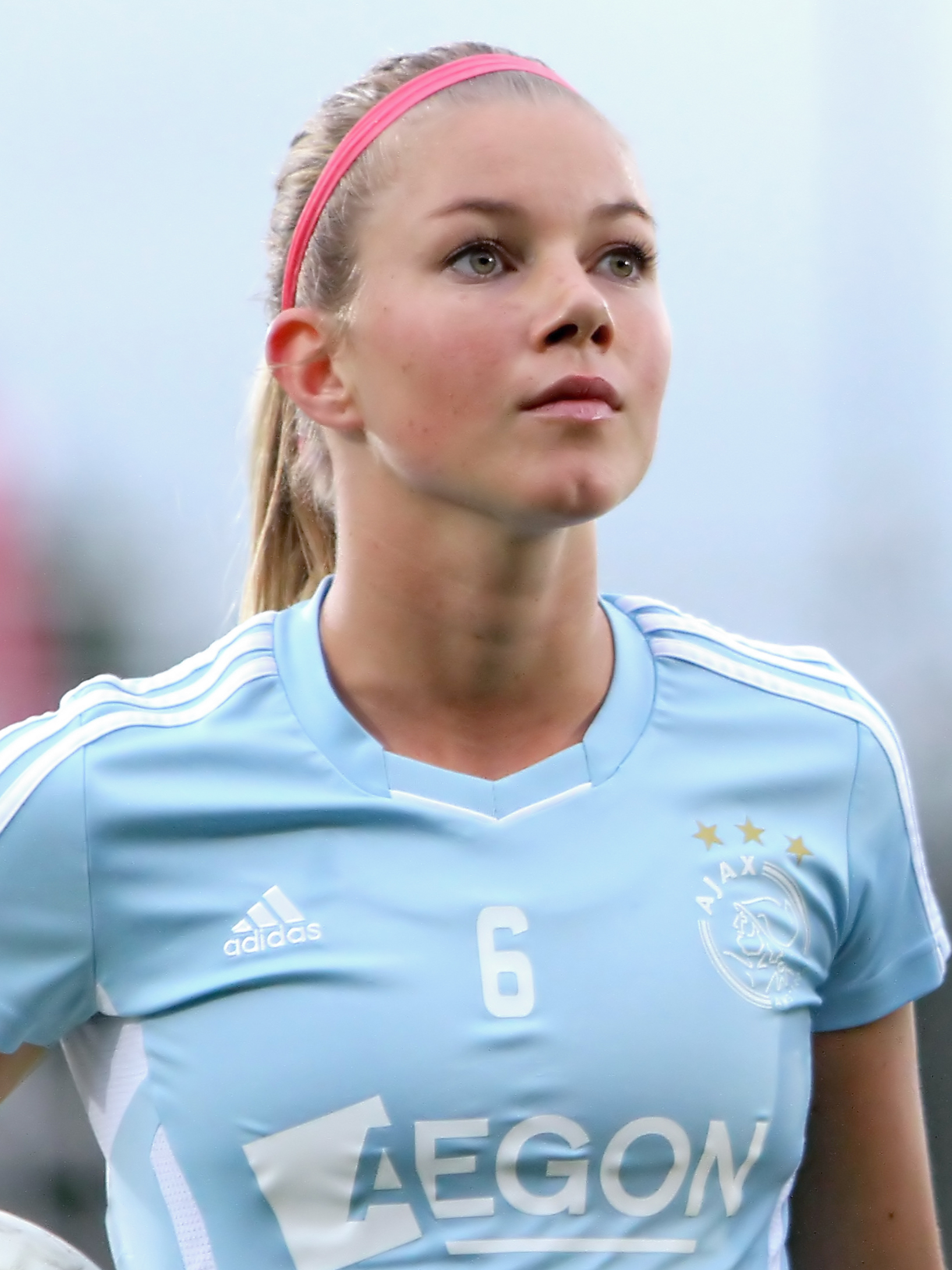
- Hoogendijk with Ajax in 2012

Personal information
- Full name: Anouk Anna Hoogendijk
- Date of birth: 6 May 1985 (age 41)
- Place of birth: Woerden, Netherlands
- Height: 1.70 m (5 ft 7 in)
- Positions: Centre back; defensive midfielder

Youth career
- Combinatie Sportclub Wilnis
- SV Argon
- Legmeervogels

Senior career*
Years	Team	Apps	(Gls)
2004–2007	Saestum	0	(0)
2007–2011	FC Utrecht	56	(5)
2011	Bristol Academy	13	(0)
2012	FC Utrecht	7	(1)
2012–2014	Ajax	35	(5)
2014	Arsenal	1	(0)
2014–2017	Ajax	34	(8)

International career^{‡}
2004–2017	Netherlands	103	(9)
- * Club domestic league appearances and goals as of 30 November 2016 ‡ National team caps and goals as of 30 November 2016

Anouk Anna Hoogendijk (Dutch pronunciation: [aːˈnuk ˈɑnaː ˈɦoːɣə(n)ˌdɛik]; born 6 May 1985) is a Dutch former professional footballer who played for Ajax as a midfielder or defender. She is nicknamed Noukie. A full international with over 100 caps since 2004 for the Dutch national team, she has represented the nation at one FIFA Women's World Cup and two UEFA Women's Euro tournaments. She played for Bristol Academy Women in the inaugural 2011 FA WSL campaign.

== Club career ==
Hoogendijk came to prominence aged 12, as a contestant on the "Geef Nooit Op" (Never Give Up) TV program. She wished to train with FC Utrecht and, after a spell with Saestum, eventually signed for Utrecht at the outset of the Eredivisie Vrouwen in 2007. Hoogendijk realised her ambition of playing abroad when she signed an eight-month contract with English WSL club Bristol Academy in January 2011.

In February 2012 Hoogendijk returned to Utrecht, before moving on to newly formed Ajax Vrouwen in May 2012. The transfer represented "a dream come true" for Hoogendijk as she had been a girlhood supporter of Ajax's male team.

In January 2014, Hoogendijk signed for the English club Arsenal Ladies. However, due to persistent injuries she only played in 3 matches during that season in London. In July 2014, Hoogendijk eventually returned for the 2014–15 season to Ajax Vrouwen. On 30 May 2016, she announced on her Instagram official account one-year extension of contract with Ajax Vrouwen.

== International career ==
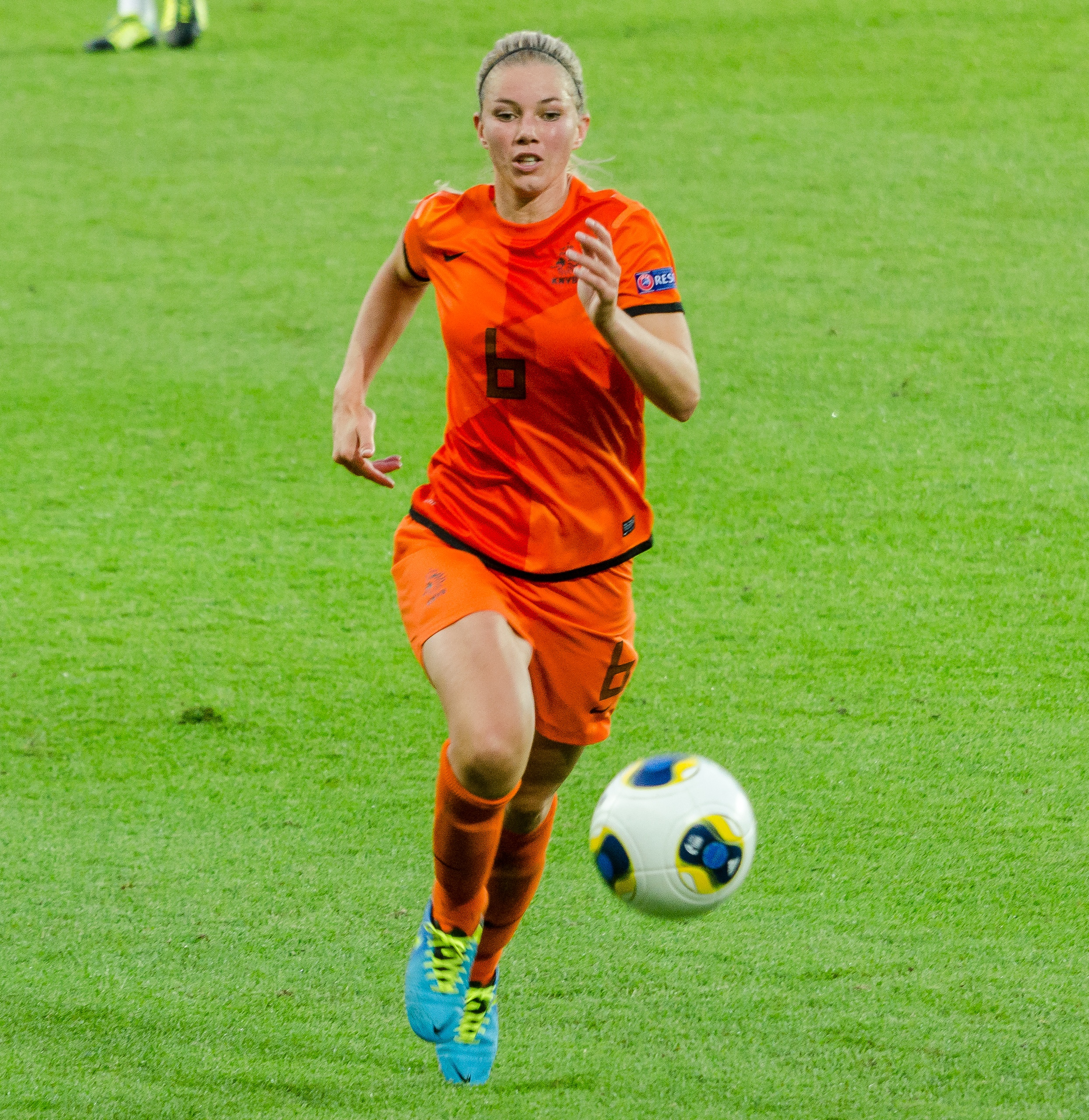
Hoogendijk playing the team's first game of the UEFA Women's Euro 2013, 0–0 against Germany in Växjö.

On 6 August 2004 Hoogendijk debuted for the senior Netherlands women's national football team, as a half-time substitute in a 2–0 defeat to Japan in Zeist.

Hoogendijk played in every match as the Netherlands reached the semi-final of UEFA Women's Euro 2009. In the quarter-final penalty shootout win over France, she struck the winning kick.

In June 2013 national team coach Roger Reijners selected Hoogendijk in the Netherlands squad for UEFA Women's Euro 2013 in Sweden. Playing in defence, Hoogendijk contributed to a very promising 0–0 draw with champions Germany in the team's opening game. She was disappointed when subsequent 1–0 defeats to Norway and Iceland consigned the Netherlands to a first round elimination: "I know it's not the end of the world but today it feels like the end of the world."

=== International summary ===
Year	Apps	Min	Gls	Goals per 90 min.
2004–2015	103	7560	9	0.10

=== International goals ===
Scores and results list the Netherlands goal tally first.

Goal	Date	Venue	Opponent	Score	Result	Competition
1.	26 March 2006	Municipal Andráshida, Zalaegerszeg, Hungary	Hungary	4–0	5–0	2007 FIFA Women's World Cup qualification
2.	23 April 2008	Patrostadion, Maasmechelen, Belgium	Belgium	1–1	2–2	UEFA Women's Euro 2009 qualifying
3.	11 July 2009	Olympic Stadium, Amsterdam, Netherlands	Switzerland	5–0	5–0	Four Nations Cup
4.	1 March 2010	GSP Stadium, Nicosia, Cyprus	Italy	1–1	1–1	2010 Cyprus Women's Cup
5.	22 April 2010	Gradski Stadion, Kumanovo, North Macedonia	North Macedonia	1–0	7–0	2011 FIFA Women's World Cup qualification
6.	13 June 2010	IJsseldelta Stadion, Zwolle, Netherlands	Belgium	3–1	4–1	Friendly
7.	21 September 2011	TATA Steel Stadion, Velsen-Zuid, Netherlands	Serbia	4–0	6–0	UEFA Women's Euro 2013 qualifying
8.	15 September 2012	Gamla Ullevi, Gothenburg, Sweden	Sweden	1–0	1–2	Friendly
9.	11 March 2015	Ammochostos Stadium, Larnaca, Cyprus	Scotland	1–2	1–3	2015 Cyprus Women's Cup

== Honours ==
=== Club ===
SV Saestum

- Hoofdklasse: 2005, 2006
- Dutch Super Cup: 2005, 2006

FC Utrecht

- Dutch Women's Super Cup: 2010
- KNVB Women's Cup: 2009–10

Arsenal

- FA Women's Cup : 2014

Ajax

- Eredivisie: 2016–17

== Style of play ==
Hoogendijk is a versatile defensive player, as she has played in roles as a central midfielder and centre back.

== Sponsors, media and other activities ==
Hoogendijk is a U.S. sportswear company Nike athlete since 2009, especially in the Netherlands. She participated in the brand campaigns Here I Am, Make Yourself and Move more, move better. Hoogendijk wears the Nike CTR360 Maestri since 2009 until its discontinuance, replacing them with the new silo Nike Magista in 2014. Finally, she chose to switch to the Nike Tiempo.

The book Balverliefd written together with Vicente de Vries, was published in April 2015. The book contains Hoogendijk biography, tips and tricks for young football players. During the Women's Euro 2022 tournament, she was an analyst for the BBC.

== Personal life ==
Hoogendijk grew up in Mijdrecht, and is daughter of physical education teachers. She has one brother. She had her first son, Sonny Otto, in October 2020, fathered by her partner, Pieter Lodewijk Verhoeven. She later had another son, Jip, by the same partner.
