= Cindy Burger =

Cindy Burger may refer to:

- Cindy Burger (footballer) (born 1980), Dutch footballer
- Cindy Burger (tennis) (born 1992), Dutch tennis player
