= Merel van Dongen =

Dutch footballer (born 1993)

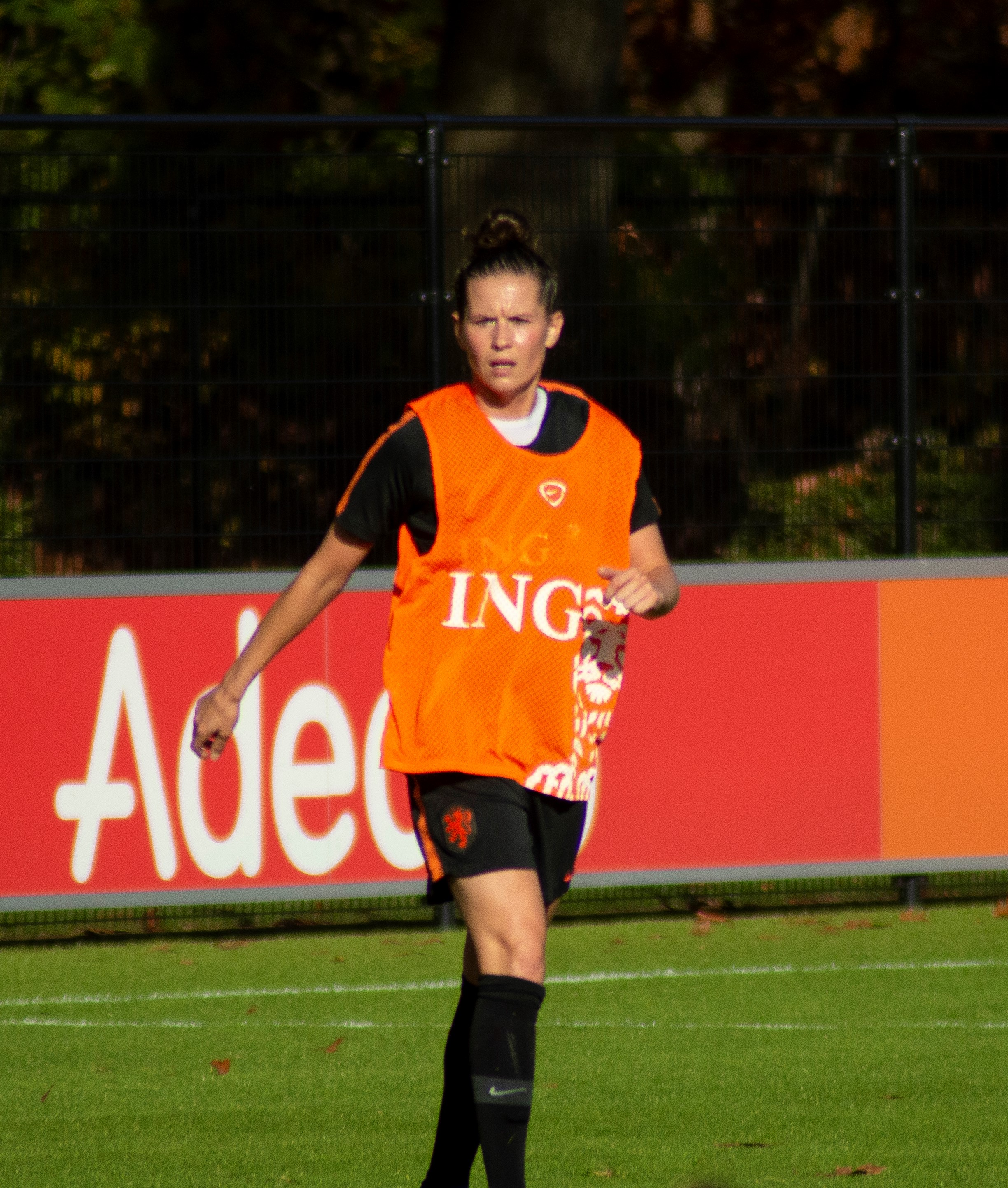
- Van Dongen training with Netherlands in 2018

Personal information
- Full name: Merel Didi van Dongen
- Date of birth: 11 February 1993 (age 33)
- Place of birth: Amsterdam, Netherlands
- Height: 1.72 m (5 ft 8 in)
- Positions: Defender; fullback

Youth career
- 2012–2014: Alabama Crimson Tide

Senior career*
Years	Team	Apps	(Gls)
2010–2011	Ter Leede		
2011–2012	ADO	10	(2)
2015–2018	Ajax	71	(9)
2018–2020	Real Betis	46	(5)
2020–2023	Atlético Madrid	71	(6)
2024–2025	Monterrey	49	(10)

International career^{‡}
2010–2012	Netherlands U19	15	(4)
2015–2022	Netherlands	63	(2)
Medal record
Women's football
Representing the Netherlands
FIFA Women's World Cup
Silver medal – second place	2019 France
- * Club domestic league appearances and goals as of 13 October 2021 ‡ National team caps and goals as of 29 July 2025

Merel Didi van Dongen (Dutch pronunciation: [ˈmeːrəl ˈdidi vɑn ˈdɔŋə(n)]; born 11 February 1993) is a former Dutch professional footballer who played as a defender.

== Club career ==
She played for Ter Leede and ADO Den Haag before going to the United States where she played for Alabama Crimson Tide. She returned to the Netherlands in 2015 and signed with AFC Ajax.

== College career ==
In Van Dongen's two years at Alabama she managed to become the Tide's single season assists leader registering 10 in 2014. She is No. 1 on Alabama's career assists per game list with 0.30 through 44 games, and her 10 assists in 2014 allowed her to take the No. 1 spot on the single season assists per game list with 0.53 through 19 games. Van Dongen converted four penalty kicks during her career with Alabama, which ranks fourth on the career penalty kicks made list.

In her last season with the Crimson Tide, she was selected to the CoSIDA/Capital One Academic All-American team and All-District 4 First Team and named a member of the All-SEC Second Team.

== International career ==
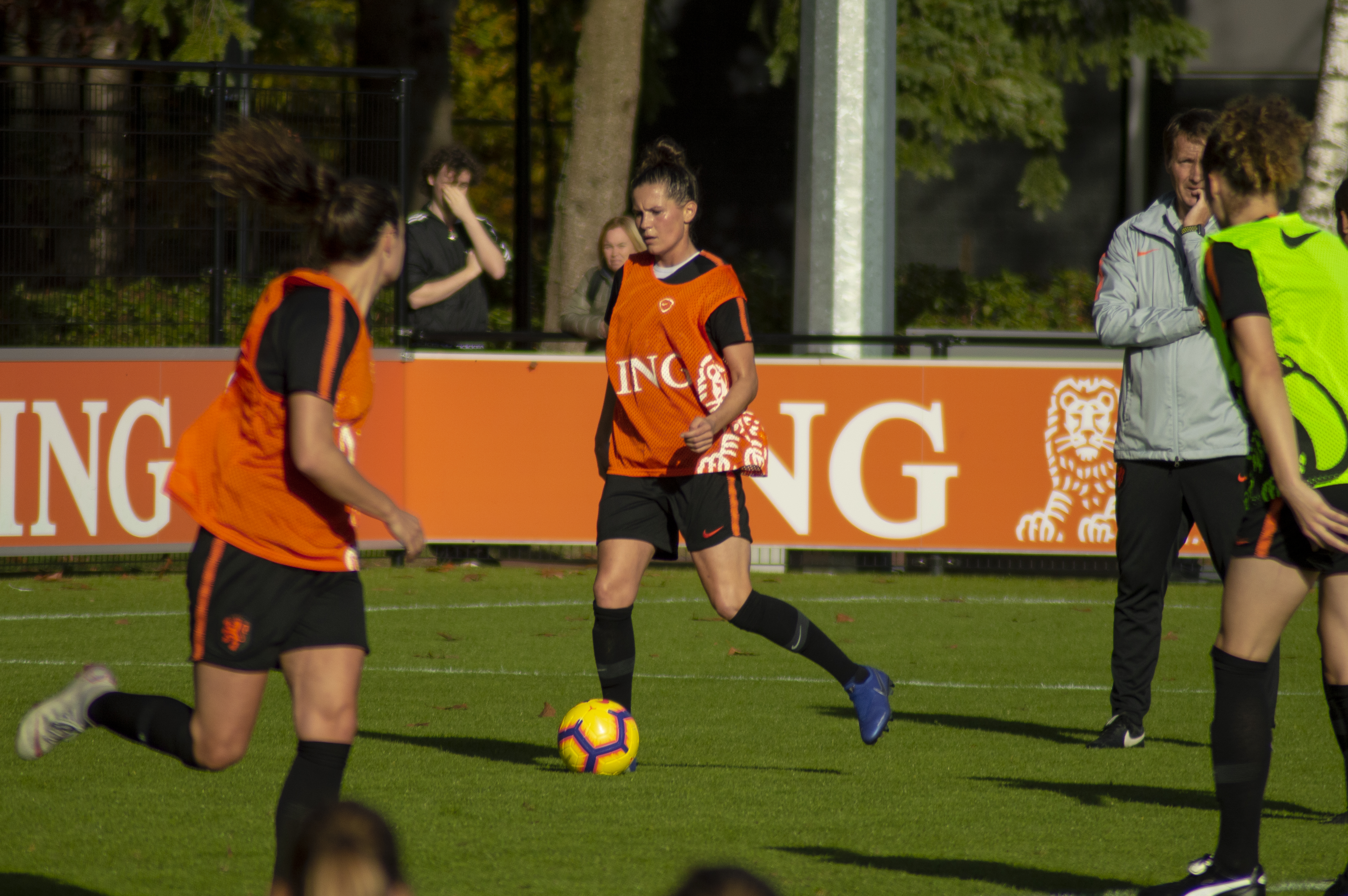
Merel van Dongen training with the Netherlands on 6 November 2018

As a junior international she played the 2010 and 2011 U-19 European Championships.

Van Dongen made her senior Netherlands women's national football team debut in a 7–0 friendly win over Thailand on 7 February 2015. She was one of the last three players to be cut from national team coach Roger Reijners' final squad for UEFA Women's Euro 2013 in Sweden. When Mandy van den Berg subsequently suffered knee ligament damage, Van Dongen was called up as a late replacement. She was also part of the Dutch squad at the 2015 FIFA Women's World Cup.

On 31 May 2023, she was named as part of the Netherlands provisional squad for the 2023 FIFA Women's World Cup.

=== International goals ===
Scores and results list the Netherlands goal tally first.

G	Date	Venue	Opponent	Score	Result	Competition
1	20 May 2015	Sparta Stadion, Rotterdam, Netherlands	Estonia	3–0	7–0	Friendly
2	22 October 2021	AEK Arena, Larnaca, Cyprus	Cyprus	8–0	8–0	2023 FIFA Women's World Cup qualifier

== Personal life ==
She is in a relationship with Ana Romero. They are engaged since December 2021. Van Dongen and Romero welcomed their first child together named Ibbie Van Dongen Romero on 28 August 2024.

== Honours ==
ADO Den Haag

- Eredivisie: 2011–12
- KNVB Women's Cup: 2011–12

Ajax

- Eredivisie: 2016–17, 2017–18
- KNVB Women's Cup: 2016–17, 2017–18

Atlético Madrid

- Copa de la Reina: 2022–23

Monterrey

- Liga MX Femenil: Clausura 2024, Apertura 2024

Netherlands

- Algarve Cup: 2018
- FIFA Women's World Cup runners-up: 2019
