= Roda JC (women) =

Defunct Dutch women's football (soccer) club

Coordinates: 50°51′39.34″N 6°2′19.33″E

- Full name: Sport Vereniging Roda Juliana Combinatie Kerkrade
- Nickname: De Trots van het Zuiden
- Founded: 2008
- Dissolved: 2009
- Ground: Kaalheide
- Capacity: 21,500
- Chairman: Servé Kuijer
- Head coach: René Eijer
- League: Eredivisie
- 2008-09: 7th
- Website: http://www.rodajc.nl/
Home colours	Away colours

Roda JC Vrouwen was the women's football section of Roda JC football club from Kerkrade, Netherlands. They wanted to join the Women's Eredivisie the year it was formed but did not receive permission by the KNVB. On 1 March 2008, Roda JC announced that the next season they would join the 2008-09 season.

In May 2009, Roda JC announced they would fold the women's section after one season, for financial reasons. The team finished in last place in its only Eredivisie season.

Roda JC worked together with RKTSV from Kerkrade.

== Results Eredivisie ==
Women's eredivisie

Season	Division	Position	W – D – L = Pts	GF – GA	Top scorer	KNVB Beker
2008–09	Eredivisie	7 / 7	1 – 4 – 19 = 7	22 – 65	Kocaçınar (4)	

== 2010-11 squad ==
Note: Flags indicate national team as defined under FIFA eligibility rules; some limited exceptions apply. Players may hold more than one non-FIFA nationality.

No.	Pos.	Nation	Player
-	GK	NED	Sandra Swinkels
-	GK	BEL	Kim Dossche
-	DF	NED	Maartje Keulen
-	DF	NED	Gwen Kuijer
-	DF	NED	Linda de Jong
-	DF	NED	Loes Plantaz
-	DF	NED	Danitsja Heiligers
-	DF	NED	Glynis Vromen
-	DF	NED	Ilse Hennen
-	DF	NED	Michéle Hamers

No.	Pos.	Nation	Player
-	MF	NED	Kelly Gilissen
-	MF	NED	Aniek Schepens
-	MF	NED	Maureen Hamers
-	MF	NED	Sharona Demandt
-	MF	NED	Miranda Valkenberg
-	MF	NED	Inge van Son
-	FW	NED	Annika Pluijmen
-	FW	NED	Shirley Kocacinar
-	FW	NED	Stephanie Harmsen
-	FW	NED	Colette van Aalst
-	FW	NED	Liv Aerts
-	FW	NED	Suzanne de Kort

Source: Vrouwenvoetbalnederland.nl& Roda JC fans.nl

== Head coaches ==
- (Netherlands) René Eijer (2008–2009)
