= Nangila van Eyck =

Dutch footballer

Personal information
- Full name: Nangila Naomi van Eyck
- Date of birth: 13 July 1984 (age 42)
- Place of birth: Dordrecht, Netherlands
- Height: 1.65 m (5 ft 5 in)
- Position: Striker

Senior career*
Years	Team	Apps	(Gls)
1998–?	DWO		
- KFC '71
- Saestum
2007–2008	ADO Den Haag		
2008–2012	Heerenveen	54	(14)
2012–2016	Meppen	54	(33)

International career
2005–2013	Netherlands	37	(6)

Managerial career
- 2020–: HHC Hardenberg Women 1
- * Club domestic league appearances and goals

Nangila Naomi van Eyck (born 13 July 1984) is a Dutch retired football striker who last played in the 2. Bundesliga for SV Meppen.

== Club career ==
At the age of 14, she started playing for SV DWO in Zoetermeer, then for KFC '71 before playing for SV Saestum of the Hoofdklasse, the highest Dutch league at the time. When the national professional league (Eredivisie) was established in 2007, she joined ADO Den Haag and later SC Heerenveen. During her time at Saestum and ADO she also participated in the UEFA European Cup / Champions League.

In 2012 she joined German 2. Bundesliga club SV Meppen, scoring a total of 40 goals in 60 matches (league and cup combined) until 2015. Van Eyck scored twice on her league debut against Turbine Potsdam II on 2 September 2012, scoring in the 61st and 80th minute. She scored 5 goals against Magdeburger FFC on 19 October 2014. Van Eyck scored four goals against Holsten Kiel on 26 April 2015.

== Managerial career ==
On 10 August 2020, Van Eyck was announced as the new manager of HHC Hardenberg Women 1. On 6 February 2021, it was announced that HHC Hardenberg had extended her contract by one season.

== International career ==
She was also a member of the Netherlands national team. She made her debut on 16 February 2005 against Spain and played 37 matches for the national team, her last on 9 February 2013 against Belgium.

== Personal life ==
She also has Surinamese heritage.

=== International goals ===
Scores and results list the Netherlands goal tally first.

Goal	Date	Venue	Opponent	Score	Result	Competition
1.	19 April 2005	Sportpark Berg & Bos, Apeldoorn, Netherlands	Canada	1–1	1–1	Friendly
2.	22 November 2006	Mitsubishi Forklift Stadion, Almere, Netherlands	Russia	5–0	5–0	Friendly
3.	9 May 2007	Herti Allmend Stadion, Zug, Switzerland	Switzerland	2–1	2–2	2009 UEFA Women's Euro qualification
4.	12 March 2008	GSP Stadium, Nicosia, Cyprus	Japan	1–0	1–2	2008 Cyprus Women's Cup
5.	4 May 2008	Univé Stadion, Emmen, Netherlands	China	1–0	2–2	Friendly
(6.)*	1 June 2012	Woezik, Wijchen, Netherlands	North Korea	3–1	4–1	Friendly
6.	5 June 2012	Golden Tulip Victoria, Hoenderloo, Netherlands	North Korea	1–0	2–0	Friendly

* Note: Match not considered as an official friendly.
