= Nadia Coolen =

Dutch football forward

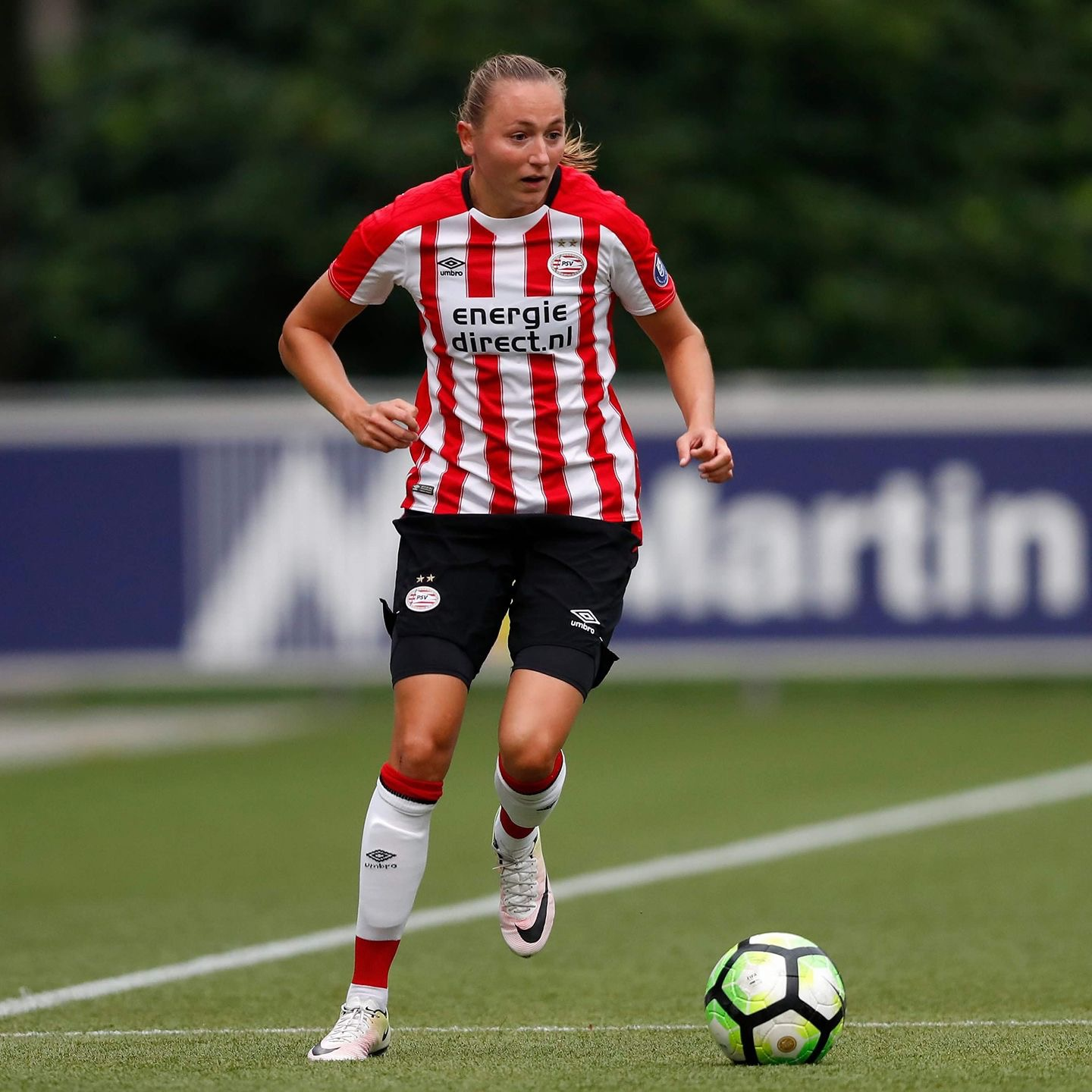
- Coolen with PSV in 2018

Personal information
- Full name: Nadia Coolen
- Date of birth: 17 August 1994 (age 32)
- Place of birth: Sittard, Netherlands
- Positions: Forward; defender

Senior career*
Years	Team	Apps	(Gls)
2011–2012	VVV-Venlo		
2012–2024	PSV	203	(33)
2024	OH Leuven		

International career^{‡}
2010	Netherlands U17	2	(1)
2011–2013	Netherlands U19	9	(2)
- * Club domestic league appearances and goals as of 23:37, 7 October 2024 (UTC) ‡ National team caps and goals as of 22:23, 12 May 2016 (UTC)

Nadia Coolen (born 17 August 1994) is a Dutch football forward who played for OH Leuven.

== Career ==
Coolen made her league debut against ADO Den Haag on 24 August 2012. She scored her first league goal against VV Alkmaar on 28 September 2012, scoring in the 18th minute. Coolen scored in the semi final against Heerenveen on 15 April 2017. She scored in the opening game of the 2017–18 season, scoring in the 76th minute against Excelsior Coolen signed a new one-year deal along with Jeslynn Kuijpers and Sara Yuceil on 14 March 2018. Her contract was extended for an extra season on 24 March 2019. Coolen signed a further two-year extension on 11 January 2020, whilst also holding the title of all-time top scorer. She extended her contract further on 2 December 2021.

Coolen left PSV after twelve years - she had joined the club when it had first started in 2012, and the fans chanted her name in her last league match. She ruled out a transfer to AFC Ajax. She was a well respected player during her time at PSV, due to her longevity at the club.

On 22 June 2024, Coolen was announced at OH Leuven, signing a two-year contract with the club.

== International career ==
Coolen scored on her U19 debut against Denmark U19s on 2 April 2011, scoring in the 46th minute.

== Honours ==
PSV

Winner

- KNVB Women's Cup (1): 2020–2021

Runner-up

- KNVB Women's Cup (4): 2013–2014, 2016–2017, 2017–2018, 2021–2022

VVV

Runner-up

- KNVB Women's Cup: 2011–12
