= Laura van Leeuwen =

Laura van Leeuwen may refer to:

- Laura van Leeuwen (footballer) (born 1985), Dutch footballer
- Laura van Leeuwen (gymnast) (born 1986), Dutch gymnast
