= Stefanie Dijkhuizen =

Dutch football midfielder

Personal information
- Full name: Stefanie Dijkhuizen
- Date of birth: 23 September 1983 (age 43)
- Place of birth: The Hague
- Position: Midfielder

Senior career*
Years	Team	Apps	(Gls)
–2009	Ter Leede		
2010–	RKDEO		

International career
2002–2003	Netherlands	7	(0)
- * Club domestic league appearances and goals

Stefanie Dijkhuizen is a Dutch football midfielder currently playing in 4th-tier First Division for RKDEO. She previously played in the former Hoofdklasse for Ter Leede, with whom she also played the European Cup.

She was a member of the Dutch national team.
