= Hanneke Mensink =

Dutch former football defender (born 1977)

Personal information
- Full name: Hanneke Mensink
- Date of birth: 1 November 1977 (age 48)
- Place of birth: Oldenzaal
- Position: Defender

Senior career*
Years	Team	Apps	(Gls)
- Quick '20
- Berghuizen
- Saestum
2004–2008	Oranje Nassau		

International career
1996–2003	Netherlands	49	(3)
- * Club domestic league appearances and goals

Hanneke Mensink is a Dutch former football defender. She played for Quick '20, FC Berghuizen, SV Saestum and Oranje Nassau before retiring in 2008.

She was a member of the Dutch national team.

== International goals ==
Scores and results list the Netherlands goal tally first.

Goal	Date	Venue	Opponent	Score	Result	Competition
1.	20 September 2000	Sportpark Panhuis, Veenendaal, Netherlands	Belarus	5–2	6–2	Friendly
2.	4 October 2000	Sportpark In De Bandert, Echt, Netherlands	Belgium	1–1	3–2	Friendly
3.	4 October 2000	Sportpark In De Bandert, Echt, Netherlands	Belgium	2–1	3–2	Friendly
