= Sara Yuceil =

Belgian footballer

Sara Yüceil
Personal information
- Full name: Sara Yüceil
- Date of birth: 22 June 1988 (age 38)
- Place of birth: Mons, Belgium
- Height: 1.68 m (5 ft 6 in)
- Position: Midfielder

Senior career*
Years	Team	Apps	(Gls)
2012–2014	OH Leuven	41	(6)
2014–2016	Standard Liège	21	(6)
2016–2017	Olympique de Marseille	15	(1)
2017–2020	PSV	51	(8)
2020–2021	OH Leuven		

International career^{‡}
2006	Belgium U19	1	(0)
2015–2021	Belgium	21	(2)
- * Club domestic league appearances and goals as of 00:39, 7 March 2016 (UTC) ‡ National team caps and goals as of 16:37, 9 July 2025 (UTC)

Sara Yüceil (born 22 June 1988) is a Belgian former football midfielder.

A midfielder who played in Belgium, France and Netherlands, Yüceil was part of the Belgium squad at UEFA Women's Euro 2017.

== Career ==
During the 2014–15 season, Yüceil was part of the Standard Liège team that won the BeNe League.

In 2016, Yüceil was announced at Olympique de Marseille.

On 16 June 2017, Yüceil was announced at PSV on a one-year contract. On 14 March 2018, Yüceil, along with Nadia Coolen and Jeslynn Kuijpers, extended their contracts with PSV. She extended her contract for one season after playing sixteen times and scoring twice. On 4 March 2019, she extended her contract with the club for another season.

On 6 April 2020, Yüceil was announced at OH Leuven, to combine her playing career with her professional career.

After the 2020–21 season, she announced her retirement from football, retiring at the club she started her career at.

== International career ==
On 16 July 2006, Yüceil made her U19 international debut against Germany.

On 11 February 2015, Yüceil made her senior international debut against Spain, coming on in the 75th minute. She scored her first international goal against Norway on 23 May 2015, scoring in the 58th minute. Yüceil scored her second international goal against Serbia on 30 November 2015, scoring in the 17th minute.

On 25 June 2017, Yüceil was called up to the Belgian squad for the UEFA Women's Euro 2017.

== After football ==
Yüceil is currently working as a consultant for RTBF, covering the UEFA Women's Euro 2025.

== Honours ==
Standard Liège

Winner

- BeNe League: 2014–15
