= Lisan Goudena =

Dutch footballer (born 1979)

Lisanne Goudena
Personal information
- Date of birth: 17 December 1979 (age 46)
- Position: Midfielder

International career
Years	Team	Apps	(Gls)
1999-2004	Netherlands	23	(0)

Lisan Goudena (born 17 December 1979) is a Dutch footballer who has played for SV Saestum. She played 23 caps for the Netherlands national team.
