= Cindy Burger (footballer) =

Dutch footballer

Personal information
- Full name: Cindy Burger
- Date of birth: 3 September 1980 (age 46)
- Place of birth: The Hague, Netherlands
- Position: Midfielder

Senior career*
Years	Team	Apps	(Gls)
1997-1999	KFC '71		
1999-2005	Ter Leede		
2005-2008	SteDoCo		
2008–2011	Willem II	49	(5)
2011–2012	VVV-Venlo	10	(1)

International career
1998–2004	Netherlands	57	(3)
- * Club domestic league appearances and goals

Cindy Burger (born 3 September 1980 in The Hague) is a former Dutch international footballer.

Burger made 57 appearances for the Netherlands women's national football team in her career. Her debut came on 16 December 1998 against Scotland and her last match was on 14 October 2004 against Germany.

== International goals ==
Scores and results list the Netherlands goal tally first.

Goal #	Date	Venue	Opponent	Score	Result	Competition
1.	21 April 1999	Sportpark Assumburg, Heemskerk, Netherlands	Nigeria	1–0	1–1	Friendly
2.	1 February 2000	Centre of Excellence, Johannesburg, South Africa	South Africa	2–0	2–0	Friendly
3.	19 May 2002	Sportpark Molenbroek, Gemert, Netherlands	Portugal	4–1	4–1	2003 FIFA Women's World Cup qualification
