= Marleen Molenaar =

Retired Dutch footballer

Personal information
- Date of birth: 30 September 1962 (age 64)
- Position: Forward

College career
Years	Team	Apps	(Gls)
1984	UC Santa Barbara Gauchos	22	(13)

International career
1989–1991	Netherlands	16	(1)

Marleen Molenaar (born 30 September 1962) is a retired Dutch footballer who played as a forward and featured for the Netherlands women's national football team. She later oversaw Eredivisie clubs AZ Alkmaar and AFC Ajax, and won the league four times between the two clubs.

== Early life and education ==
Molenaar, of Laren, Netherlands, didn't start playing football until the age of 16 when in secondary school. Upon consultation with coaches from the Netherlands national team, she decided to play overseas to and continue her education, ultimately landing at the University of California, Santa Barbara in Spring 1984. While enrolled as a student, she played for the UC Santa Barbara Gauchos women's soccer team, where she played forward with future internationals Carin Jennings and Gina Cassella. Molenaar broke the school's record for assists in a season with 17 total en route to the 1984 NCAA Women's Soccer Tournament, the first time the Gauchos had appeared in the NCAA Division I Women's Soccer Championship. Upon completion of her freshman season, she appeared in 22 games for the Gauchos and scored 13 goals.

== International career ==
Molenaar made her national team debut for Netherlands on 3 October 1989 in an international friendly against Belgium. She appeared in UEFA Women's Euro 1991 qualifying matches shortly thereafter. She scored her only international goal on 28 May 1991 in a friendly against the United States. Her last international appearance came later that year in October 1991 against Sweden.

== Post-playing career ==
Molenaar was named manager of AZ Alkmaar prior to the start of the 2007–08 Eredivisie season, the first for the league and club. Under her leadership, the club won the first three Eredivisie titles prior to leaving the club in July 2010.

AFC Ajax named Molenaar as their manager prior to their inaugural season in the 2012–13 BeNe League. She won the KNVB Women's Cup and another Eredivisie title before leaving the club in November 2017.

== Personal life ==
Molenaar's father, Cees Molenaar, was also a footballer who founded AZ Alkmaar with her uncle, Klaas Molenaar.

== Honors ==
AZ Alkmaar

- Eredivisie: 2007–08, 2008–09, 2009–10

AFC Ajax

- Eredivisie: 2016–17
- KNVB Women's Cup: 2013–14
