= Petra Dugardein =

Dutch footballer

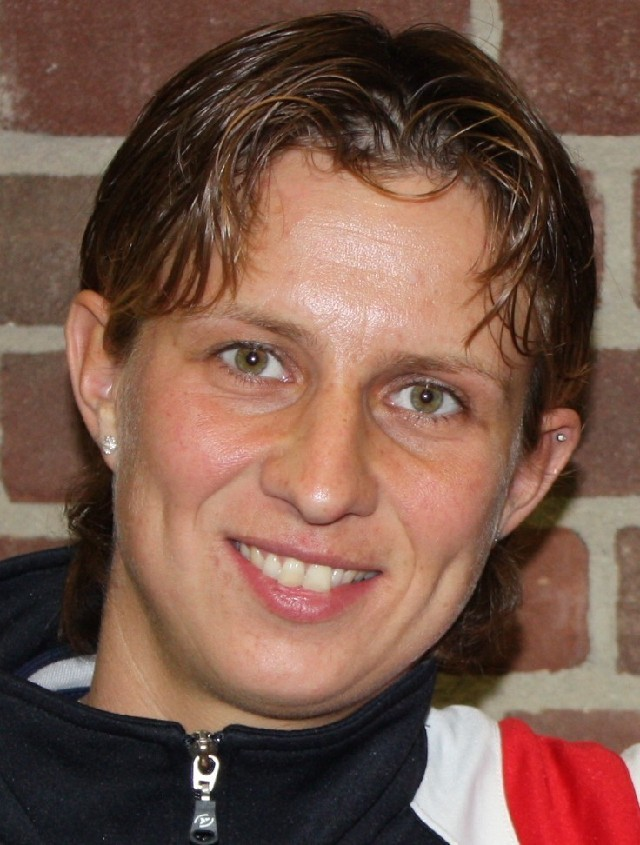

Personal information
- Full name: Petra Dugardein
- Date of birth: 14 April 1977 (age 49)
- Place of birth: Zierikzee, Netherlands
- Height: 1.80 m (5 ft 11 in)
- Position: Goalkeeper

Senior career*
Years	Team	Apps	(Gls)
- VV Zierikzee
- WIK '57
- SC 't Zand
2007–2009	Willem II		
2009–2011	ADO Den Haag		

International career^{‡}
2008–2009	Netherlands	4	(0)
- * Club domestic league appearances and goals as of 10:15, 29 May 2013 (UTC) ‡ National team caps and goals as of 10:15, 29 May 2013 (UTC)

Petra Dugardein (born 14 April 1977) is a Dutch former international football goalkeeper. A latecomer to top level football, she played club football in the Eredivisie for Willem II and ADO Den Haag. Dugardein announced her immediate retirement from football in January 2011.

== International career ==
On 4 May 2008, 31-year-old Dugardein debuted for the senior Netherlands women's national football team, playing the second half of a 2–2 draw with China in Emmen.

Loes Geurts played in every match as the Netherlands reached the semi-final of UEFA Women's Euro 2009, with Dugardein and Angela Christ as the understudies.

During her football career Dugardein was serving as a driver in the Royal Netherlands Army. She was part of the winning Netherlands team at the 2004 World Military Cup.
