= 2010–11 Eredivisie (women) =

Eredivisie Vrouwen
- Season: 2010–11
- Dates: 2 September 2010 – 12 May 2011
- Champions: FC Twente (1st title)
- UEFA Women's Champions League: FC Twente
- Matches: 84
- Goals: 268 (3.19 per match)
- Top goalscorer: Chantal de Ridder (19)
- Total attendance: 44,710 (532 per match)

The 2010–11 Eredivisie Vrouwen was the fourth season of the Netherlands women's professional football league. League matches were played from 2 September 2010 to 12 May 2011 with eight teams. FC Twente became champions for the first time, breaking AZ's three-year championship run. The 84 matches of the season had a 44,710 total attendance.

== Teams ==
Location of teams in the Eredivisie 2010–11

On 10 March 2010, two new teams, VVV-Venlo and FC Zwolle were confirmed as participants, expanding the league from six to eight teams.

Team	City / Town	Venue(s)	Capacity
ADO Den Haag	The Hague	Kyocera Stadion	15,000
ADO Den Haag	The Hague	Sportpark Nieuw Hanenburg	1,500
AZ	Alkmaar	TATA Steel Stadion (Velsen)	3,625
AZ	Alkmaar	Sportpark Egmonderhout	
SC Heerenveen	Heerenveen	Sportpark Skoatterwâld	3,000
SC Heerenveen	Heerenveen	Zuidersportpark (Sneek)	3,150
SC Heerenveen	Heerenveen	Abe Lenstra Stadion	26,000
FC Twente	Enschede	De Grolsch Veste	30,205
FC Twente	Enschede	Sportpark Slangenbeek (Hengelo)	2,000
FC Twente	Enschede	FC Twente-trainingscentrum (Hengelo)	1,000
FC Utrecht	Utrecht	Sportpark Elinkwijk	5,000
FC Utrecht	Utrecht	Sportpark Maarschalkerweerd	1,000
FC Utrecht	Utrecht	Sportcomplex Zoudenbalch	450
VVV-Venlo	Venlo	Seacon Stadion De Koel	8,000
VVV-Venlo	Venlo	Sportpark VV VOS	
Willem II	Tilburg	Sportcomplex Bijstervelden	1,500
FC Zwolle	Zwolle	FC Zwolle Stadion	10,500
FC Zwolle	Zwolle	Sportpark Ceintuurbaan	3,000

Source: Soccerway

== Format ==
The season was played in a triple round-robin format, where all eight participating teams played each other three times (once at home, once away with the third confrontation defined by a lottery-system at the second half the season), a total of 21 matches each. The champion qualified to the UEFA Women's Champions League. There was no relegation system in place.

== Standings ==
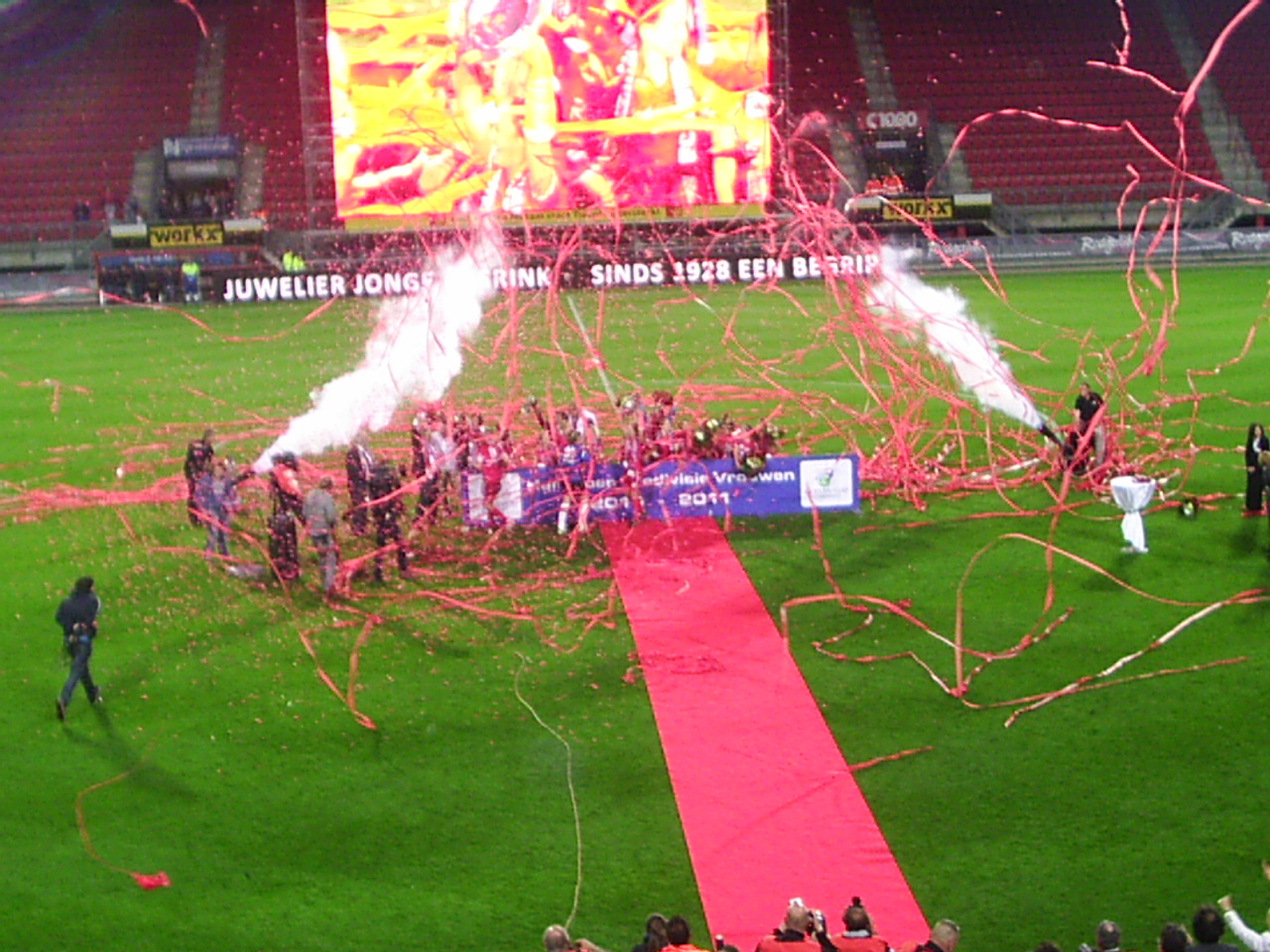
Championship Ceremony FC Twente Women

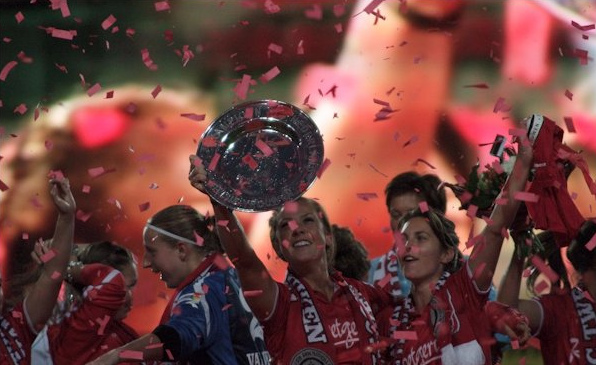
Championship Ceremony FC Twente Women

Pos	Team	Pld	W	D	L	GF	GA	GD	Pts	Qualification
1	Twente (C, Q)	21	13	5	3	39	20	+19	44	2011–12 UEFA Women's Champions League
2	ADO Den Haag	21	13	4	4	53	24	+29	43	
3	AZ	21	12	4	5	43	25	+18	40	
4	Heerenveen	21	9	7	5	33	30	+3	34	
5	Utrecht	21	7	9	5	30	29	+1	30	
6	VVV-Venlo	21	3	8	10	27	44	−17	17	
7	Willem II	21	3	3	15	22	40	−18	12	
8	PEC Zwolle	21	2	4	15	21	56	−35	10	

Source: soccerway
Rules for classification: 1) Points; 2) Goal difference; 3) Number of goals scored
(C) Champions; (Q) Qualified for the phase indicated

== Results ==
First and second round

Home \ Away	ADO	AZ	HEE	TWE	UTR	WIL	ZWO	VVV
ADO Den Haag		2–3	2–2	2–2	4–1	2–1	3–0	5–1
AZ	1–2		2–2	1–2	2–2	3–1	3–2	0–0
Heerenveen	2–1	0–1		2–0	0–0	2–1	1–1	3–2
Twente	2–2	2–1	3–2		0–0	1–0	1–0	2–0
Utrecht	2–0	1–0	2–2	1–1		2–2	3–2	1–0
Willem II	1–2	1–3	1–3	2–1	3–1		2–0	1–1
PEC Zwolle	0–5	1–2	0–1	0–2	1–3	1–0		1–1
VVV-Venlo	2–2	0–3	2–3	1–4	1–0	3–1	5–2	

Source: soccerway
Legend: Blue = home team win; Yellow = draw; Red = away team win.

Third round

Home \ Away	ADO	AZ	HEE	TWE	UTR	WIL	ZWO	VVV
ADO Den Haag		0–3			4–0		5–0	3–0
AZ			3–1	1–2		1–0		7–3
Heerenveen	0–2				2–1		2–2	1–1
Twente	0–2		3–0			4–1		1–0
Utrecht		0–0		1–1		2–1		
Willem II	1–2		0–2				1–3	
PEC Zwolle		1–3		1–5	1–6			
VVV-Venlo					1–1	1–1	2–2	

Source: soccerway
Legend: Blue = home team win; Yellow = draw; Red = away team win.

== Top scorers ==
Pos.	Player	Club	Goals
1	(Netherlands) Chantal de Ridder	AZ	19
2	(Netherlands) Lisanne Grimberg	ADO Den Haag	14
2	(Netherlands) Renate Jansen	ADO Den Haag	14
4	(Netherlands) Lisanne Vermeulen	FC Zwolle	11
5	(Netherlands) Marlous Pieëte	FC Twente	10
5	(Netherlands) Dominique Vugts	FC Utrecht	10
7	(Netherlands) Sylvia Smit	SC Heerenveen	9
7	(Netherlands) Lieke Martens	VVV-Venlo	9
9	(Netherlands) Shanice van de Sanden	SC Heerenveen	8
10	(Netherlands) Claudia van den Heiligenberg	AZ	7
10	(Netherlands) Nangila van Eyck	SC Heerenveen	7
12	4 players		6
16	4 players		5
20	5 players		4
25	7 players		3
32	16 players		2
48	27 players		1
Own goals			5
Total:			268
Games:			84
Average:			3.19

Source: vrouwenvoetbalnederland.nl
