= Kika van Es =

Dutch footballer (born 1991)

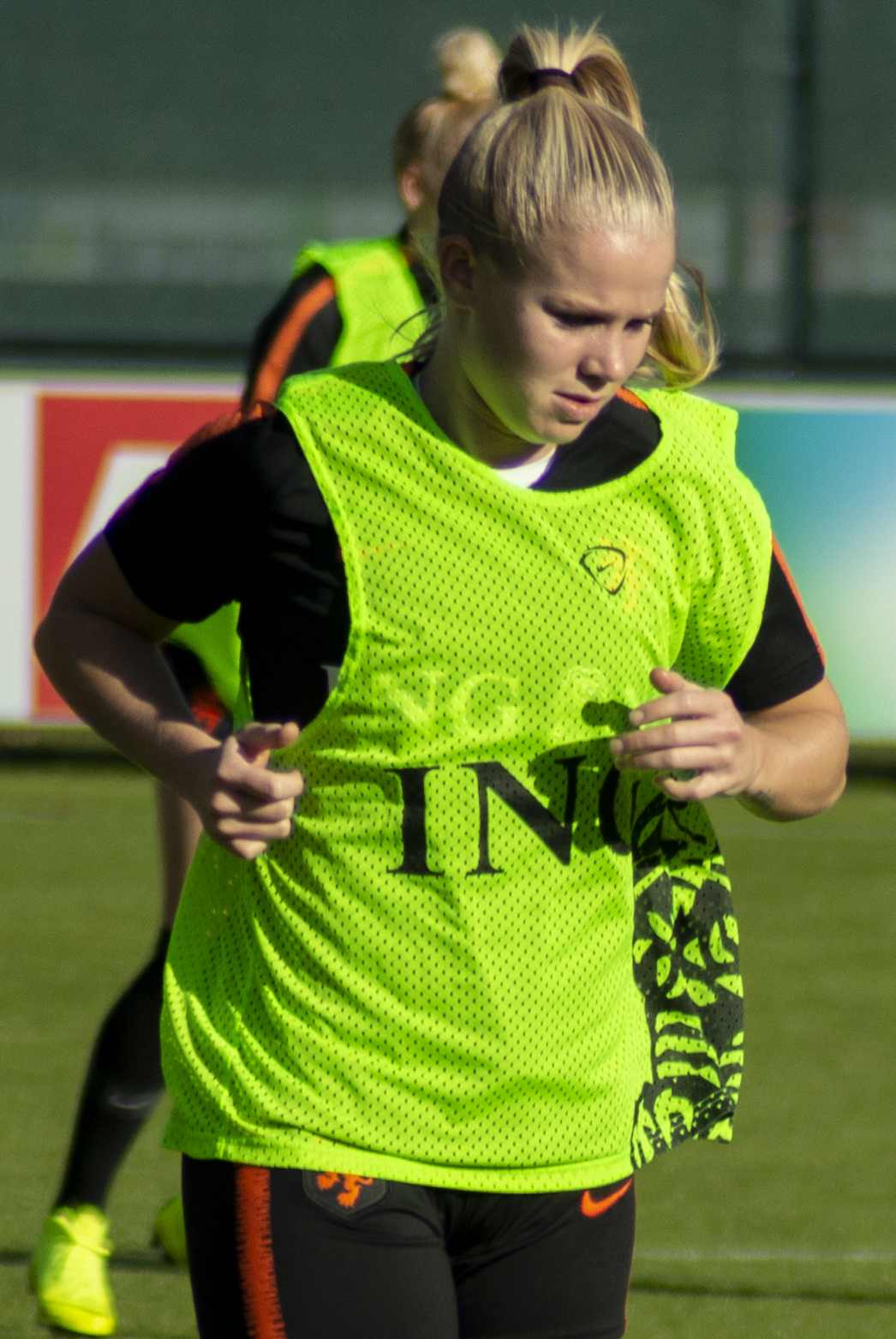
- Van Es with Netherlands in 2018

Personal information
- Date of birth: 11 October 1991 (age 35)
- Place of birth: Boxmeer, Netherlands
- Height: 1.69 m (5 ft 7 in)
- Position: Defender

Youth career
- Olympia '18

Senior career*
Years	Team	Apps	(Gls)
2008–2010	Willem II	36	(1)
2010–2012	VVV-Venlo	37	(4)
2012–2016	PSV/FC Eindhoven	56	(3)
2016–2017	Achilles '29	24	(3)
2017–2018	Twente	21	(1)
2018–2019	Ajax	23	(1)
2019–2020	Everton	10	(0)
2020–2022	Twente	35	(1)
2022–2023	PSV	15	(0)

International career
2006	Netherlands U15	1	(0)
2007–2008	Netherlands U17	16	(1)
2008–2010	Netherlands U19	20	(1)
2009–2022	Netherlands	77	(0)
Medal record
Women's football
Representing the Netherlands
FIFA Women's World Cup
Silver medal – second place	2019 France
UEFA Women's Championship
Gold medal – first place	2017 Netherlands
- * Club domestic league appearances and goals

Kika van Es (Dutch pronunciation: [ˈkikaː vɑn ˈɛs]; born 11 October 1991) is a Dutch former professional footballer who played as a defender for the Netherlands national team.

== Club career ==
She started her career at Olympia '18 and in 2008 moved to Willem II of the Eredivisie where she played for two seasons. In 2010, she signed with Eredivisie's newly created team VVV-Venlo and when the club dissolved in 2012, all its players were taken by another newly created team, PSV/FC Eindhoven to play in the BeNe League.

In 2016, she signed with Achilles '29. After one season with the club, she moved to FC Twente on 16 June 2017.

After Twente she played a year for Ajax before moving to England to play for Everton. In September 2020, van Es left Everton.

On 21 September it was announced that van Es had rejoined FC Twente after two seasons away from the club.

== International career ==
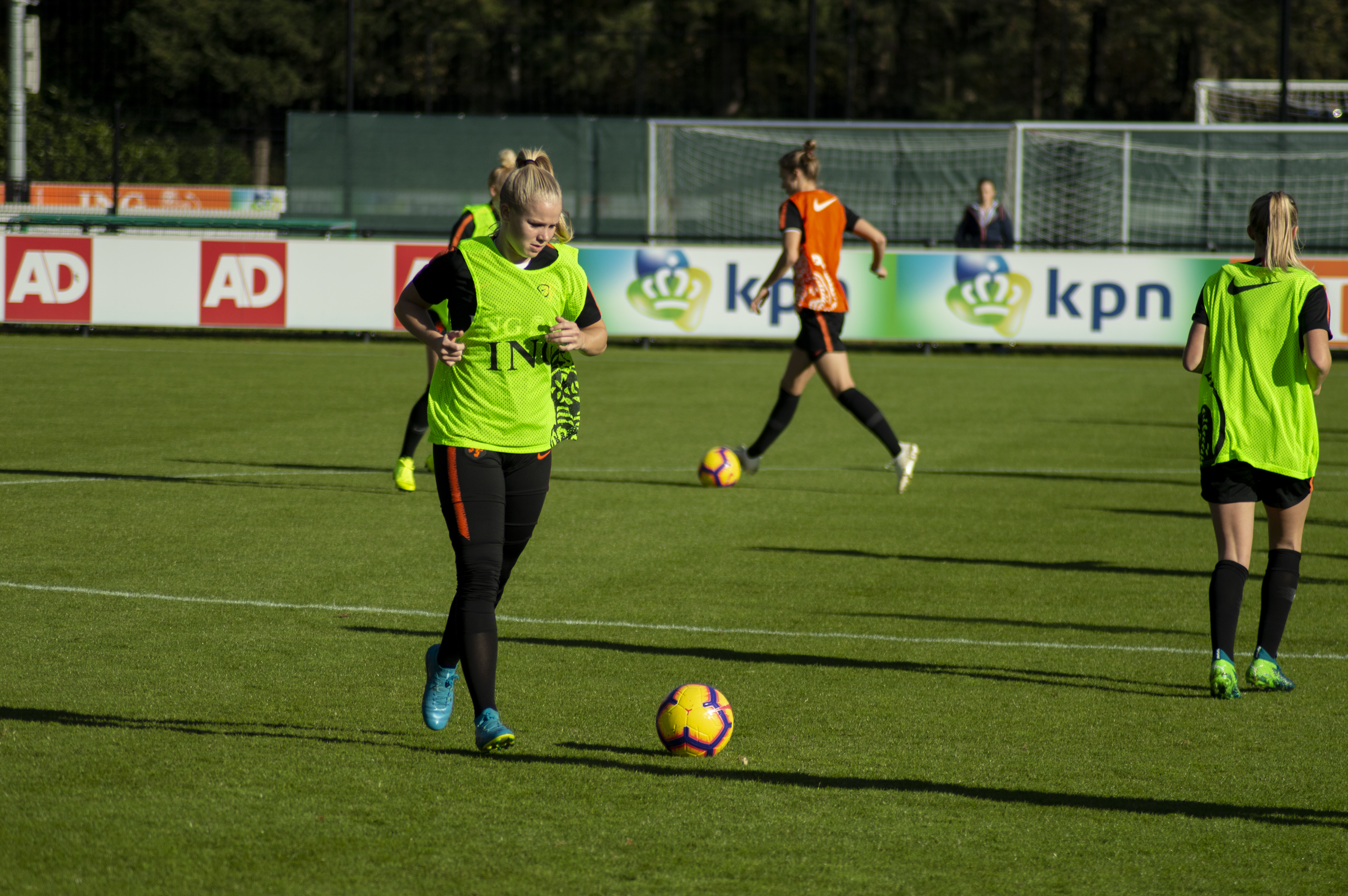
van Es training with the Netherlands on November 6, 2018

She is a member of the Netherlands women's national football team, making her debut on 21 November 2009 against Belarus. In June 2013 Van Es was among the last three players to be cut from national team coach Roger Reijners' Netherlands squad for UEFA Women's Euro 2013 in Sweden.

In 2017, Van Es was called up to be part of the team that participated in UEFA Women's Euro 2017. She started all 6 games for the team, and helped the team win the tournament. After the tournament, the whole team was honoured by the Prime Minister Mark Rutte and Minister of Sport Edith Schippers and made Knights of the Order of Orange-Nassau.

Van Es was selected to the final squad for the 2019 FIFA Women's World Cup in France.

On 31 May 2023, she was named as part of the Netherlands provisional squad for the 2023 FIFA Women's World Cup.

== Honours ==
Netherlands

- UEFA Women's Euro: 2017
- Algarve Cup: 2018
- FIFA Women's World Cup: 2019 runners-up

Individual

- Knight of the Order of Orange-Nassau: 2017
