= Liv Aerts =

Dutch footballer (born 1992)

Personal information
- Date of birth: 26 August 1992 (age 34)
- Position: Midfielder

International career
Years	Team	Apps	(Gls)
2008	Netherlands U16	2	(0)

Liv Aerts (born 26 August 1992) is a Dutch footballer plays Roda. Aerts has previously played for PSV, Genk and Borussia Mönchengladbach.
