= Jeslynn Kuijpers =

Dutch footballer (born 1995)

Personal information
- Full name: Jeslynn Petronella Kuijpers
- Date of birth: 23 June 1995 (age 31)
- Place of birth: Tilburg, Netherlands
- Height: 1.58 m (5 ft 2 in)
- Position: Forward

Team information
- Current team: OH Leuven
- Number: 19

Youth career
- SC 't Zand

Senior career*
Years	Team	Apps	(Gls)
2011	Willem II	3	(0)
2011–2012	VVV-Venlo	17	(6)
2012–2023	PSV	218	(31)
2023–	OH Leuven	51	(16)

International career
2009–2010	Netherlands U15	6	(1)
2010–2011	Netherlands U16	8	(0)
2010–2012	Netherlands U17	10	(3)
2012–2014	Netherlands U19	28	(9)
2016–2017	Netherlands	5	(0)
Medal record
Women's football
Representing Netherlands
UEFA Women's Under-19 Championship
Winner	2014 Norway
- * Club domestic league appearances and goals as of 3 May 2025

Jeslynn Petronella Kuijpers (born 23 June 1995) is a Dutch professional footballer who plays as a forward for Belgian Women's Super League club OH Leuven.

== Club career ==
=== Willem II ===
Kuijpers started her career with her hometown club SC 't Zand at the age of eight. On 21 April 2011, she made her Eredivisie debut for Willem II, which had a partnership with SC 't Zand.

=== VVV-Venlo ===
She joined VVV-Venlo in June that year following the withdrawal of Willem II from women's football. Kuijpers made her league debut against Twente on 2 September 2011. She scored her first league goal against Utrecht on 16 December 2011, scoring in the 28th minute. Kuijpers scored a hattrick against PEC Zwolle on 11 May 2012.

=== PSV ===
Kuijpers joined newly formed PSV in June 2012. She made her league debut against ADO Den Haag on 24 August 2012. Kuijpers scored her first league goals against PEC Zwolle on 30 November 2012, scoring a brace in the 38th and 40th minute. On 29 June 2016, it was announced that she had signed a one-year deal. Kuijpers scored a hattrick against PEC Zwolle on 23 December 2016. On 14 March 2018, Kuijpers, along with Nadia Coolen and Sara Yuceil, extended their contracts. On 13 September 2020, she became the first player to play 200 matches for the team. On 18 March 2022, Kuijpers signed a new one-year deal.

=== OH Leuven ===
On 5 June 2023, Kuijpers was announced at OH Leuven.

== International career ==
Kuijpers has represented Netherlands at various youth levels. She was part of the Netherlands under-19 team which won 2014 UEFA Women's Under-19 Championship. Kuijpers was called up to the preliminary Dutch squad for the Olympics. She made her senior team debut on 10 April 2016 in a 2–1 friendly defeat against Canada.

== Career statistics ==
=== International ===
As of match played 20 January 2017

Appearances and goals by national team and year
National team	Year	Apps	Goals
Netherlands	2016	4	0
Netherlands	2017	1	0
Total		5	0
