= Sandra Doreleijers =

Dutch footballer (born 1977)

Personal information
- Date of birth: 6 July 1977 (age 49)

International career
Years	Team	Apps	(Gls)
1995-1997	Netherlands	9	(0)

Sandra Doreleijers is a former Dutch football player and manager. Since retiring from professional football she now serves as the chairwoman of PSV Eindhoven.

== International career ==
Doreleijers represented the Netherlands 9 times.
