= Atty Eelkema =

Dutch association football player

Personal information
- Date of birth: 16 April 1982 (age 44)
- Position: Forward

International career
| Years | Team | Apps | (Gls) |
| 2007-2008 | Netherlands | 2 | (0) |

Atty Eelkema (born 16 April 1982) is a Dutch footballer who played for Arsenal WFC. Eelkema earned 2 caps for the Netherlands national team, making her debut in a victory over Wales in a friendly.

After retiring, Eelkema became the coach of FC Groningen.
