= Maran van Erp =

Dutch footballer (born 1990)

Personal information
- Date of birth: 3 December 1990 (age 35)
- Place of birth: Veldhoven, Netherlands
- Height: 1.71 m (5 ft 7 in)
- Position: Defender

Youth career
- RKVVO

Senior career*
Years	Team	Apps	(Gls)
2009–2011	Willem II	37	(1)
2011–2012	VVV-Venlo	18	(4)
2012–2016	PSV	79	(3)
Total		134	(8)

International career
2007	Netherlands U17	1	(0)
2015	Netherlands	1	(0)
- * Club domestic league appearances and goals

Maran van Erp (Dutch pronunciation: [maːˈrɑɱ vɑn ˈɛr(ə)p]; born 3 December 1990) is a Dutch former footballer who played as a defender.

== Club career ==
=== Willem II ===
In the summer of 2009, Van Erp left amateur association RKVVO to play with Willem II in the Eredivisie. She made her league debut against Twente on 8 October 2009. Van Erp scored her first league goal against ADO Den Haag on 5 May 2011, scoring in the 90th minute.

=== VVV-Venlo ===
After two years playing for the Tricolores, she moved to VVV-Venlo. Van Erp made her league debut against Twente on 2 September 2011. She scored her first league goal against PEC Zwolle on 27 January 2012, scoring in the 71st minute.

=== PSV ===
After a year she returned to Brabant, to play for PSV/FC Eindhoven in the newly formed BeNe League. Van Erp made her league debut against ADO Den Haag on 24 August 2012. She scored her first league goal against Club Brugge on 21 February 2014, scoring in the 74th minute.

On 17 June 2016, Van Erp retired from football, choosing to focus on her social career.

== International career ==
On 3 April 2015, Van Erp was called up to the national team. On 20 May 2015, Van Erp debuted for the Netherlands in a friendly against Estonia in the 62nd minute, replacing another debutant, Marthe Munsterman. In 2015, she was among the 23-roster who was called to represent Netherlands in the 2015 FIFA Women's World Cup.

== Personal life ==
On 11 December 2015, Van Erp joined FlowSports.
