= Manoe Meulen =

Dutch footballer

Personal information
- Full name: Manoe Mathilda Catharina Maria Meulen
- Date of birth: 11 September 1978 (age 48)
- Place of birth: Weert, Netherlands
- Position: Defender

Youth career
- 1988–1992: sv Laar

Senior career*
Years	Team	Apps	(Gls)
1992–1995	sv Laar		
1995–2005	sv Braakhuizen		
2005–2008	SteDoCo		
2008–2011	Willem II	63	(0)
2011–2012	VVV-Venlo	18	(0)

International career
2003–2011	Netherlands	55	(1)
- * Club domestic league appearances and goals

Manoe Mathilda Catharina Maria Meulen (born 11 September 1978) is a retired Dutch football defender. After making her national team debut in April 2003, she represented the senior Netherlands women's national football team on 55 occasions, scoring one goal. Meulen played in all five matches as the Netherlands reached the semi-final of UEFA Women's Euro 2009.

== International goals ==
Scores and results list the Netherlands goal tally first.

Goal	Date	Venue	Opponent	Score	Result	Competition
1.	22 April 2010	Gradski Stadion, Kumanovo, Macedonia	North Macedonia	4–0	7–0	2011 FIFA Women's World Cup qualification
