= Mildred Baal =

Dutch association football player

Personal information
- Date of birth: 5 April 1966 (age 60)
- Position: Midfielder

International career
| Years | Team | Apps | (Gls) |
| 1990–1992 | Netherlands | 9 | (1) |

Mildred Baal (born 5 April 1966) is a Dutch footballer who played as a midfielder for DVC Den Dungen. Baal won 9 caps for the Netherlands national team. Since retiring from football, Baal has taken up football coaching.
