= VVV-Venlo (women) =

Defunct Dutch women's football (soccer) club

Coordinates: 51°21′7″N 6°10′47″E

- Full name: Venlose Voetbal Vereniging
- Founded: 10 March 2010
- Dissolved: 11 June 2012
- Ground: De Koel
- Capacity: 8,000
- Chairman: Hai Berden
- Head coach: Rick de Rooij
- League: Eredivisie
- 2011–12: 5th
Home colours	Away colours

VVV-Venlo was a Dutch women's football from Venlo. The team was founded in 2010 and started playing in the Vrouwen Eredivisie in the 2010–11 season. The club worked together with SV Venray, which at the time played in the Hoofdklasse. In 2011, VVV announced a partnership with German club FCR 2001 Duisburg.

The club's first goal was scored by future Dutch national player Lieke Martens, who led the team in goals in its inaugural season. In its second and final season, the club reached the final of the KNVB Women's Cup, where it lost to ADO Den Haag.

VVV-Venlo ended its women's team in June 2012, after finishing its second season. On its website, the club cited the formation of new women's clubs by PSV Eindhoven and AFC Ajax as a main reason for ending its club. It said PSV's club, in particular, jeopardized VVV because many of VVV's players would want to play for PSV, which had ambitious plans for its women's club.

== Results Eredivisie ==
6	5
11	12
Women's eredivisie

Season	Division	Position	W – D – L = Pts	GF – GA	Top scorer	KNVB Beker
2010–11	Eredivisie	6 / 8	3 – 8 – 10 = 17	27 – 44	Martens (9)	Quarterfinals
2011–12	Eredivisie	5 / 7	6 – 2 – 10 = 20	34 – 47	van de Donk (8)	Finalist

== Final squad ==
As of 25 April 2012. This was the squad in their final season. Note: Flags indicate national team as defined under FIFA eligibility rules; some limited exceptions apply. Players may hold more than one non-FIFA nationality.

No.	Pos.	Nation	Player
1	GK	BEL	Veerle Willekens
25	GK	NED	Sandra Swinkels
-	GK	GER	Sabrina Theissen
2	DF	NED	Kika van Es
3	DF	NED	Danitsja Heiligers
4	DF	NED	Michelle van der Laan
5	DF	NED	Renée Kersten
8	DF	NED	Manoe Meulen
15	DF	NED	Maxime Scheepers
6	MF	NED	Maran van Erp
10	MF	NED	Daniëlle van de Donk

No.	Pos.	Nation	Player
11	MF	NED	Nadine Hanssen
14	MF	NED	Melissa Evers
17	MF	NED	Aniek Schepens
20	MF	NED	Myrthe Moorrees
-	MF	NED	Cindy Burger
7	FW	NED	Nadia Coolen
9	FW	NED	Mauri van de Wetering
12	FW	NED	Marlou Kelleners
18	FW	NED	Bibi Cox
19	FW	NED	Jeslynn Kuijpers

Source: Soccerway

== Head coaches ==
- (Netherlands) Rick de Rooij (2010–2012)
