= Laura van Leeuwen (footballer) =

Dutch association football player

Personal information
- Date of birth: 20 August 1985 (age 41)
- Position: Midfielder

International career
Years	Team	Apps	(Gls)
2001–2002	Netherlands U17	12	(0)
2003–2004	Netherlands U19	23	(1)
2004	Netherlands	1	(0)

Laura van Leeuwen (born 20 August 1985) is a Dutch football player who has represented the Netherlands national team. Leeuwen won 1 cap for the Netherlands national team.

Since retiring from professional football she has become a director at MVV Maastricht in 2023. A year later, she resigned due to personnel differences.
