= Sandra Swinkels =

Dutch football player

Personal information
- Date of birth: 24 April 1988 (age 38)
- Place of birth: Someren, Netherlands
- Position: Goalkeeper

International career
Years	Team	Apps	(Gls)
2003	Netherlands U15	1	(0)
2003–2004	Netherlands U17	4	(0)
2006–2007	Netherlands U19	2	(0)
2009	Netherlands	1	(0)

Sandra Swinkels (born 24 April 1988) is a Dutch footballer who has played for VVV-Venlo. Swinkels has one cap for the Netherlands national team in a victory over South Africa in a friendly. After retiring, Swinkles became a football coach.
