= KFC '71 =

DV KFC '71
- Full name: Kruikelientjes Football Club 1971
- Founded: 1971
- Dissolved: 2010
- League: Dames Eerste Klasse (III)
- 2009-10: 12th
Home colours	Away colours

KFC '71 was a women's football club from Delft, Netherlands.

The team was founded in 1971 and got dissolved after the 2009-10 season, after failing to better their financial situation. The team won two national championships by winning the Hoofdklasse in 1986 and 1989 and three national cups, the KNVB Women's Cup in 1987, 1990 and 1991.

In its last season the team played in the third tier but was getting relegated to fourth tier football.

== Titles ==
- 2 times champion of the Netherlands: 1986, 1989
- 3 times cup winner: 1987, 1990,1991
