= Puck Deventer =

Dutch ladies football club

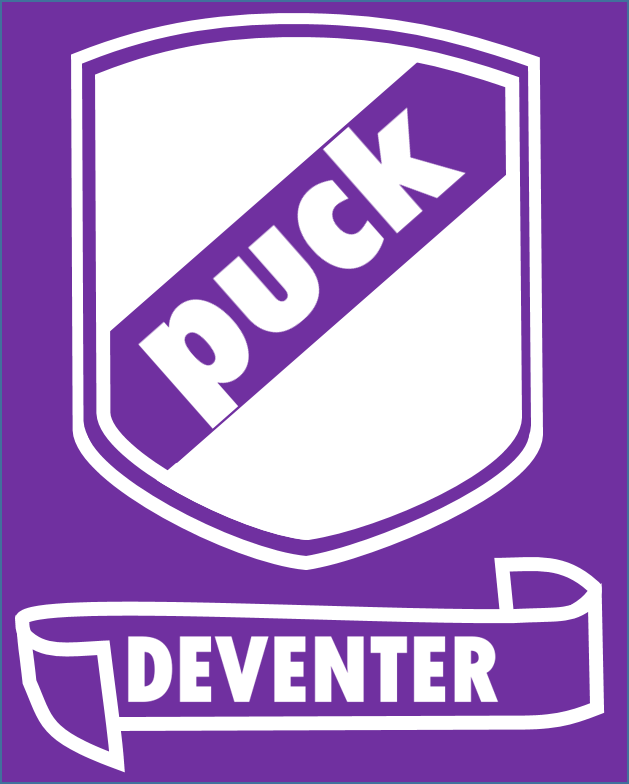
- Founded: 1971
- Dissolved: 2000
- Ground: sportcomplex Borgele, Deventer
Home colours

Puck Deventer was founded as "Damesvoetbalvereniging Puck" (ladies football club Puck). The club was unusual because it only fielded women's teams. It won the national title in 1982, when it won the play-off competition between six regional champions. In the 1980s and 1990s Puck belonged to the top in Dutch women's football. In 2000 it was dissolved and was absolved into the Koninklijke UD.
