= Be Quick '28 =

Dutch football club

- Founded: 1928
- Ground: Ceintuurbaan 2, Zwolle
- Capacity: 3,000
- League: Derde Klasse
Home colours

Be Quick '28 is a football club from Zwolle, Netherlands. It was founded on 22 November 1928.
