= Ter Leede =

Association football club in Sassenheim, Netherlands

- Full name: Voetbalvereniging; Ter Leede
- Founded: 30 April 1930; 95 years ago
- Ground: Roodemolen; Sassenheim
- Capacity: 2,000
- Chairman: Frank Kuijper
- Manager: Martijn Lagendijk
- League: Vierde Divisie
- 2024–25: Vierde Divisie A, 14th of 16
- Website: terleede.nl
Home colours	Away colours

Ter Leede is a football club based in Sassenheim, Netherlands. The club was established on 30 April 1930, as a merger of the clubs Poellaan and Roda.

The men's team is currently playing in the Dutch Vierde Divisie.

== Women's section ==
The women's team played in the women's Hoofdklasse, the highest level of women's football in the country, until the introduction of the Eredivisie in 2007. It never fielded a women's team in the Eredivisie and now plays in the Topklasse, the third level of Dutch women's football.

The women's team won the Hoofdklasse title four times and the KNVB Women's Cup three times. In 2001–02, Ter Leede was the first Dutch team in the UEFA Women's Cup, the precursor to the Women's Champions League. The team finished in second place in its group, behind Ryazan WFC of Russia. The women's team also took part in 2003–04, finishing in second in its group behind Fulham L.F.C., and in 2004–05, finishing in third place in its group.

== Honours ==
=== Women's team ===
==== National ====
- Hoofdklasse
  - Winners (4): 2001, 2003, 2004, 2007
  - Winner, second tier (2): 2009, 2010
- Dutch Cup
  - Winners (3): 1992, 2001, 2007

==== UEFA Women's Cup ====
Season	Stage	Opponent	Result
2001–02	2nd qualifying round	(Russia) Ryazan	0–4
2001–02	2nd qualifying round	(Slovakia) Žilina	1–0
2001–02	2nd qualifying round	(Greece) Kavala	8–0
2003–04	2nd qualifying round	(Moldova) Codru Anenii Noi	8–0
2003–04	2nd qualifying round	(Faroe Islands) Klaksvík	5–0
2003–04	2nd qualifying round	(England) Fulham	1–3
2004–05	1st qualifying round	(Iceland) KR Reykjavík	0–1
2004–05	1st qualifying round	(Slovenia) Krka Novo Mesto	2–0
2004–05	1st qualifying round	(Finland) MPS Malmin	1–1
