= Hoofdklasse (women) =

- Founded: 1973
- Country: Netherlands
- Confederation: UEFA
- Number of clubs: 12
- Level on pyramid: 2 (since 2008); 1 (1973-2007)
- Promotion to: Topklasse
- Relegation to: Eerste Klasse
- Domestic cup: KNVB Women's Cup

The Hoofdklasse is the second highest league of amateur women's football in the Netherlands, and the third tier in general.

When the Hoofdklasse was created in 1973, the league was the top-level league of the Netherlands, and the winner was named the national champion. After the 2006/07 season, the professional Eredivisie was established as the top-level league which now plays out the championship.

There was no relegation or promotion between those two leagues.

In the 2011/12 season the Hoofdklasse became a third level league, and above it the Topklasse was created. The Hoffdklasse thus is the second highest amateur league and now promotes teams to the Topklasse.

== Format ==
From 1973 to 1994, the Hoofdklasse was Championship Playoff between regional champions. Mostly consisting of 6 regional champions that would play each other once. The winner of the group becoming the champion of the Netherlands. Since the 1994–95 season the Hoofdklasse was played nationwide as a 12 team league.

The teams play each other 2 times over the course of the season.

The last two teams get relegated into the Eerste Klasse.

== Current Teams (2018-19) ==
Teams the play in the 2018–19 season.

Team	Home city	Home ground	Capacity
RCL	Leiderdorp	Sportpark de Bloemerd	2000
PEC Zwolle II	Zwolle	Sportpark De Marslanden	2000
VV Vooruitgang is Ons Doel Driesum	Driesum	Sportpark Treffers Heech	1000
SSS	Klaaswaal	Sportpark SSS	1000
CVV Oranje Nassau	Groningen	Sportpark Coendersborg	1800
VV Heerenveen	Heerenveen	Sportpark Skoatterwâld	3000
BE QUICK 1928	Zwolle	Sportpark Ceintuurbaan	3000
VV Sterk Door Combinatie	Hoornaar	Sportpark SteDoCo	1700
VV IJzendijke	IJzendijke	Gemeentelijk Sportpark IJzendijke	2000
TER Leede II	Sassenheim	Sportpark De Roodemolen	3000
HTC Zwolle	Zwolle	Sportpark De Pelikaan	1000
Sporting 1970	Utrecht	Sportpark Voordorp (Sporting 70)	1000

== Hoofdklasse champions ==
Until 2012, the Hoofdklasse was the first tier and its champions were champions of the Netherlands. Since 2012, the Hoofdklasse is a third level league and the winner is no longer the champion of the Netherlands.

=== 1973–1990 ===
- 1973–74: VV Reutum
- 1974–75: Osdorp Amsterdam
- 1975–76: Blauw Wit Amsterdam
- 1976–77: RKSV Braakhuizen
- 1977–78: Sint Hubert
- 1978–79: Alkmania Roelofarendsveen
- 1979–80: RKSV Braakhuizen
- 1980–81: RKSV Braakhuizen
- 1981–82: Puck Deventer
- 1982–83: RKTVC Tiel
- 1983–84: Groote Lindt Zwijndrecht
- 1984–85: UD Weerselo
- 1985–86: KFC '71 Delft
- 1986–87: RKSV Braakhuizen
- 1987–88: RKTVC Tiel
- 1988–89: KFC '71 Delft
- 1989–90: Rijsoord

=== 1990–2007 ===
- 1990–91: Den Dungen
- 1991–92: Den Dungen
- 1992–93: Den Dungen
- 1993–94: Den Dungen
- 1994–95: Den Dungen
- 1995–96: SV Saestum
- 1996–97: SV Saestum
- 1997–98: SV Saestum
- 1998–99: SV Saestum
- 1999–2000: SV Saestum
- 2000–01: Ter Leede
- 2001–02: SV Saestum
- 2002–03: Ter Leede
- 2003–04: Ter Leede
- 2004–05: SV Saestum
- 2005–06: SV Saestum
- 2006–07: Ter Leede

=== Since 2007 ===
- 2007–08: SV Saestum
- 2008–09: Ter Leede
- 2009–10: Ter Leede
- 2010–11: RCL
- 2011–12: DTS Ede and RKHVV (2 divisions)
- 2012–13: Wartburgia and Gelre
- 2013–14: Oranje Nassau Groningen and SV Saestum II
- 2014–15: BVV Barendrecht and VV AV Eindhoven
