= SV Saestum =

- Full name: Sport Vereniging Saestum
- Founded: 6 January 1926
- Ground: Sportpark Saestum
- League: Hoofdklasse (II)
- 2009–10: 2nd
Home colours

SV Saestum is a sports club from Zeist, Netherlands.

It is most known for its successful women's football team.

== History ==
The club was founded on 6 January 1926. The women's football section opened in 1981. Since the founding of the Hoofdklasse, Saestum plays in the league, which was the highest national league in the Netherlands until the creation of the Eredivisie in 2007. In 1996 the team won its first national championship, the first one of five championships in a row. Three more titles followed in 2002, 2005 and 2006.

The club first qualified for the UEFA Women's Cup in 2002-03, they won 2 out of 3 matches in the first qualifying round. In the 2005-06 edition they became the first Dutch team to move on to the second qualifying round, where they met the eventual finalist 1. FFC Turbine Potsdam and semi-finalist Montpelier HSC winning only 3 points. The next season they again reached the second qualifying round and only lost by goal difference to Potsdam after 2 wins and one draw. It was enough to qualify for the quarter finals, which they lost heavily to eventual losing finalist Umeå.

SV Saestum has the highest attendance in the Hoofdklasse.

== Former players ==
- (Netherlands) Anouk Hoogendijk
- (Suriname) Katoucha Patra

== Honours ==
=== National ===
- Hoofdklasse
  - Winners (9): 1996, 1997, 1998, 1999, 2000, 2002, 2005, 2006, 2008
- Dutch Cup
  - Winners (4): 1997, 1998, 2004, 2009
- Dutch Cup
  - Winners (3): 2004, 2005, 2006

=== UEFA Women's Cup ===
Season	Stage	Opponent	Result	Home	Away
2002–03	2nd qualifying round	(Norway) Trondheims-Ørn	0–2		
2002–03	2nd qualifying round	(Romania) Regal Bucharest	2–0		
2002–03	2nd qualifying round	(Greece) P.A.O.K.	8–1		
2005–06	1st qualifying round	(Spain) Athletic Bibao	1–1		
2005–06	1st qualifying round	(Belgium) Rapid Wezemaal	2–1		
2005–06	1st qualifying round	(Scotland) Glasgow City Ladies	7–0		
2005–06	2nd qualifying round	(France) Montpellier	2–1		
2005–06	2nd qualifying round	(Germany) Turbine Potsdam	0–2		
2005–06	2nd qualifying round	(Austria) SV Neulengbach	4–3		
2006–07	1st qualifying round	(Croatia) Maksimir	7–0		
2006–07	1st qualifying round	(Republic of Ireland) Dundalk	6–1		
2006–07	1st qualifying round	(Wales) Cardiff City Ladies F.C.	2–0		
2006–07	2nd qualifying round	(Czech Republic) Sparta Prague	3–1		
2006–07	2nd qualifying round	(Germany) Turbine Potsdam	2–2		
2006–07	2nd qualifying round	(Belgium) Rapid Wezemaal	2–0		
2006–07	Quarter-finals	(Sweden) Umeå	3–11	1–6	2–5
