= Willem II (women) =

Defunct Dutch women's football (soccer) club

Coordinates: 51°32′34″N 5°4′1″E

- Full name: Willem II
- Nickname: Tricolores
- Founded: 2007
- Dissolved: 2011
- Ground: Willem II Stadion
- Capacity: 14,700
- Head coach: Peter Coumans
- League: Eredivisie
- 2010–11: 7th
- Website: http://www.willem2.org/
Home colours	Away colours

Willem II Vrouwen was the women's football section of Willem II football club from Tilburg, the Netherlands. They were founder members of the Eredivisie Vrouwen in 2007. In their first season, they finished second out of six teams, the highest finish they would have. The following season, the club was tied for first place entering its final match before losing to league champion AZ Alkmaar, 6–0.

In February 2011, Willem II announced they were withdrawing support for their women's section for financial reasons. The women's club main sponsor had dropped its support for the team.

== Results Eredivisie ==
2	3	3	7
08	09	10	11
Women's eredivisie

Season	Division	Position	W – D – L = Pts	GF – GA	Top scorer	KNVB Beker
2007–08	Eredivisie	2 / 6	10 – 4 – 6 = 34	41 – 21	Stevens (20)	Semifinals
2008–09	Eredivisie	3 / 7	14 – 4 – 6 = 46	44 – 34	Stevens, Vugts (10)	
2009–10	Eredivisie	3 / 6	8 – 2 – 10 = 26	26 – 33	Slegers (5)	Semifinals
2010–11	Eredivisie	7 / 8	3 – 3 – 15 = 12	22 – 40	van de Wetering (5)	Round of 16

== 2010-11 squad ==
Note: Flags indicate national team as defined under FIFA eligibility rules; some limited exceptions apply. Players may hold more than one non-FIFA nationality.

No.	Pos.	Nation	Player
-	GK	NED	Eline Sol
-	GK	TUR	Leyla Bağcı
-	DF	NED	Jette van Vlerken
-	DF	NED	Marte van de Wouw
-	DF	NED	Manoe Meulen
-	DF	NED	Marloe Jacobs
-	DF	NED	Maran van Erp
-	DF	NED	Roos Havermans
-	DF	NED	Mandy Glaudemans
-	DF	NED	Jeslynn Kuijpers

No.	Pos.	Nation	Player
-	MF	NED	Karin Stevens
-	MF	NED	Renee Slegers
-	MF	NED	Marloe Peeters
-	MF	NED	Cindy Burger
-	MF	NED	Danielle van de Donk
-	FW	NED	Elise Tak
-	FW	NED	Mauri vande Wetering
-	FW	NED	Marjolein van de Bighelaar
-	FW	NED	Nikki van de Pas
-	FW	NED	Mayke Bressers
-	FW	NED	Melissa Reuser

Source: nl.women.soccerway.com

== Head coaches ==
- (Netherlands) Edwin Petersen (2007–2009)
- (Netherlands) Frans de Kat (2009–2010)
- (Netherlands) Peter Coumans (2010–2011)
