= KNVB Women's Cup =

Dutch women's football cup competition

KNVB Beker Vrouwen
- Organiser(s): KNVB
- Founded: 1980
- Region: Netherlands
- Teams: 121 (2023–24)
- Current champions: FC Twente
- Most championships: AFC Ajax (6 titles)
- Website: EurojackpotKNVBBeker.nl

The KNVB Women's Cup (Dutch: KNVB Beker Vrouwen) is the cup competition for women's football in the Netherlands. The competition was established in 1980, along with the KNVB Amateur Cup. It is organized by the Royal Dutch Football Association (Koninklijke Nederlandse Voetbalbond or KNVB). It is currently called the Eurojackpot KNVB Beker due to an advertising agreement.

With the formation of the Eredivisie in the 2007, the first round of the cup was a group stage for clubs in the lower leagues, the Hoofdklasse and the Eerste Klasse. Eredivisie clubs joined the competition in the second round. The amateur Topklasse joined the competition in the 2015–16 competition. In 2020, the cup competition was abandoned before the quarterfinal round, due to the COVID-19 pandemic. In 2019, the 12 Eredivisie clubs join the competition in the Round of 16, which also had four clubs from lower leagues. In 2025–2026, the three top finishers in the previous Eredivisie season entered the competition in the quarterfinals, with the other clubs in the top league entering in the Round of 16.

== Winners ==
Year	Winners	Result	Runners-up
1980–81	HSV Celeritas		Puck Deventer
1981–82	RKTVC	2–1	VV ONB
1982–83	Puck Deventer	3–0	AFC '34
1983–84	VV Flevo		RKTVC
1984–85	KFC		
1985–86	ODC	3–2	UD
1986–87	KFC '71	3–2	VV ONB
1987–88	RKTVC	5–1	KFC
1988–89	KFC	4–1	KFC '71
1989–90	KFC '71		
1990–91	KFC '71	1–0	KFC
1991–92	Ter Leede	6–0, 0–3	DVC Den Dungen
1992–93	KFC	2–0	SV Braakhuizen
1993–94	DVC Den Dungen	2–1	FC Gelre
1994–95	DVC Den Dungen	2–1	Puck Deventer
1995–96	WFC		
1996–97	Saestum		
1997–98	Saestum		
1998–99	WFC		
1999–2000	Zwart-Wit '28	4–2	Saestum
2000–01	Ter Leede	3–1	Saestum
2001–02	SV Braakhuizen	1–0	Saestum
2002–03	SV Fortuna Wormerveer	3–2	Saestum
2003–04	Saestum	2–1	SV Braakhuizen
2004–05	Oranje Nassau	5–0	Be Quick '28
2005–06	SV Fortuna Wormerveer	2–1 a.e.t.	Be Quick '28
2006–07	Ter Leede	4–1	RVVH
2007–08	FC Twente	3–1	FC Utrecht
2008–09	Saestum	2–1	Oranje Nassau
2009–10	FC Utrecht	3–0	Ter Leede
2010–11	AZ Alkmaar	2–0	SC Heerenveen
2011–12	ADO Den Haag	5–2	VVV-Venlo
2012–13	ADO Den Haag	1–1 (5–4 pen)	FC Twente
2013–14	AFC Ajax	2–1	PSV/FC Eindhoven
2014–15	FC Twente	3–2	AFC Ajax
2015–16	ADO Den Haag	1–0	AFC Ajax
2016–17	AFC Ajax	3–0	PSV/FC Eindhoven
2017–18	AFC Ajax	3–1	PSV
2018–19	AFC Ajax	2–1	PEC Zwolle
2019–20	Abandoned due to the COVID-19 pandemic		
2020–21	PSV	1-0	ADO Den Haag
2021–22	AFC Ajax	2–1	PSV
2022–23	FC Twente	4–0	PSV
2023–24	AFC Ajax	3–1	Fortuna Sittard
2024–25	FC Twente	2–1	PSV
2025–26	FC Twente	2–2 (a.e.t.) (4–3 p)	PSV

=== Most wins ===
Team	Wins
AFC Ajax	6
SV Fortuna Wormerveer (incl. WFC), SV Saestum, FC Twente	5
ADO Den Haag, KFC, KFC '71, Ter Leede	3
DVC Den Dungen, RKTVC	2
AZ Alkmaar, SV Braakhuizen, HSV Celeritas, VV Flevo, ODC, Oranje Nassau, Puck Deventer, FC Utrecht, Zwart-Wit '28	1
