= 2013 Cyprus Women's Cup squads =

List of players competing at the 6th edition of the Cyprus Women's Cup

This article lists the squads for the 2013 Cyprus Women's Cup, the 6th edition of the Cyprus Women's Cup. The cup consisted of a series of friendly games, and was held in Cyprus from 3 to 14 March 2013. The twelve national teams involved in the tournament registered a squad of 23 players.

The age listed for each player is on 3 March 2013, the first day of the tournament. The numbers of caps and goals listed for each player do not include any matches played after the start of tournament. The club listed is the club for which the player last played a competitive match prior to the tournament. The nationality for each club reflects the national association (not the league) to which the club is affiliated. A flag is included for coaches that are of a different nationality than their own national team.

== Group A ==
=== England ===
Coach: Hope Powell

The squad was announced on 12 February 2013.

No.	Pos.	Player	Date of birth (age)	Club
1	GK	Karen Bardsley	14 October 1984 (aged 28)	(The Football Association) Lincoln Ladies
2	DF	Alex Scott	14 October 1984 (aged 28)	(The Football Association) Arsenal
3	DF	Steph Houghton	23 April 1988 (aged 24)	(The Football Association) Arsenal
4	MF	Jill Scott	2 February 1987 (aged 26)	(The Football Association) Everton
5	DF	Sophie Bradley	20 October 1989 (aged 23)	(The Football Association) Lincoln Ladies
6	DF	Casey Stoney	13 May 1982 (aged 30)	(The Football Association) Lincoln Ladies
7	MF	Karen Carney	1 August 1987 (aged 25)	(The Football Association) Birmingham City
8	MF	Anita Asante	27 April 1985 (aged 27)	(Swedish Football Association) Göteborg
9	FW	Eniola Aluko	21 February 1987 (aged 26)	(The Football Association) Chelsea
10	FW	Kelly Smith	29 October 1978 (aged 34)	(The Football Association) Arsenal
11	MF	Rachel Yankey	1 November 1979 (aged 33)	(The Football Association) Arsenal
12	MF	Fara Williams	25 January 1984 (aged 29)	(The Football Association) Liverpool
13	GK	Siobhan Chamberlain	15 August 1983 (aged 29)	(The Football Association) Bristol Academy
14	FW	Ellen White	9 May 1989 (aged 23)	(The Football Association) Arsenal
15	MF	Jessica Clarke	5 May 1989 (aged 23)	(The Football Association) Lincoln Ladies
16	DF	Dunia Susi	10 August 1987 (aged 25)	(The Football Association) Chelsea
17	MF	Jordan Nobbs	8 December 1992 (aged 20)	(The Football Association) Arsenal
18	DF	Laura Bassett	2 August 1983 (aged 29)	(The Football Association) Birmingham City
19	DF	Rachel Unitt	5 June 1982 (aged 30)	(The Football Association) Birmingham City
20	FW	Toni Duggan	25 July 1991 (aged 21)	(The Football Association) Everton
21	GK	Rachel Brown	2 July 1980 (aged 32)	(The Football Association) Everton
22	FW	Rachel Williams	10 January 1988 (aged 25)	(The Football Association) Birmingham City

=== Italy ===
Coach: Antonio Cabrini

The squad was announced on 25 February 2013.

No.	Pos.	Player	Date of birth (age)	Club
	GK	Chiara Marchitelli	14 May 1985 (aged 27)	(Italian Football Federation) Graphistudio Tavagnacco
	GK	Sara Penzo	16 December 1989 (aged 23)	(Italian Football Federation) Brescia
	GK	Katja Schroffenegger	28 April 1991 (aged 21)	(German Football Association) USV Jena
	DF	Michela Rodella	8 January 1989 (aged 24)	(Italian Football Federation) Graphistudio Tavagnacco
	DF	Sara Gama	27 March 1989 (aged 23)	(Italian Football Federation) Brescia
	DF	Raffaella Manieri	26 November 1986 (aged 26)	(Italian Football Federation) Torres
	DF	Giorgia Motta	18 March 1984 (aged 28)	(Italian Football Federation) Torres
	DF	Laura Neboli	14 March 1988 (aged 24)	(German Football Association) FCR 2001 Duisburg
	DF	Elisabetta Tona	22 January 1984 (aged 29)	(Italian Football Federation) Torres
	DF	Federica Di Criscio	12 May 1993 (aged 19)	(Italian Football Federation) Bardolino Verona
	DF	Roberta D'Adda	5 October 1981 (aged 31)	(Italian Football Federation) Brescia
	MF	Pamela Conti	4 April 1982 (aged 30)	(Russian Football Union) Zorky Krasnogorsk
	MF	Daniela Stracchi	2 September 1983 (aged 29)	(Italian Football Federation) Torres
	MF	Alice Parisi	11 December 1990 (aged 22)	(Italian Football Federation) Graphistudio Tavagnacco
	MF	Alessia Tuttino	15 March 1983 (aged 29)	(Italian Football Federation) Graphistudio Tavagnacco
	MF	Elisa Camporese	16 March 1984 (aged 28)	(Italian Football Federation) Graphistudio Tavagnacco
	MF	Lisa Alborghetti	19 June 1993 (aged 19)	(Italian Football Federation) Brescia
	MF	Marta Carissimi	3 May 1987 (aged 25)	(Italian Football Federation) Bardolino Verona
	FW	Patrizia Panico	8 February 1975 (aged 38)	(Italian Football Federation) Torres
	FW	Cristiana Girelli	23 April 1990 (aged 22)	(Italian Football Federation) Bardolino Verona
	FW	Sandy Iannella	6 April 1987 (aged 25)	(Italian Football Federation) Torres
	FW	Daniela Sabatino	26 June 1985 (aged 27)	(Italian Football Federation) Brescia
	FW	Carolina Pini	13 June 1988 (aged 24)	(Italian Football Federation) Bardolino Verona
	FW	Barbara Bonansea	13 June 1991 (aged 21)	(Italian Football Federation) Brescia

=== New Zealand ===
Coach: (England) Tony Readings

The squad was announced on 15 February 2013.

No.	Pos.	Player	Date of birth (age)	Club
1	GK	Erin Nayler	17 April 1992 (aged 20)	Unattached
2	DF	Ria Percival	7 December 1989 (aged 23)	(German Football Association) USV Jena
3	DF	Anna Green	20 August 1990 (aged 22)	(German Football Association) Lokomotive Leipzig
4	MF	Katie Hoyle	1 February 1988 (aged 25)	(New Zealand Football) Eastern Suburbs
5	DF	Abby Erceg	20 November 1989 (aged 23)	(Football Australia) Adelaide United
7	DF	Ali Riley	30 October 1987 (aged 25)	(Swedish Football Association) Malmö
8	MF	Hayley Bowden	13 February 1984 (aged 29)	Unattached
9	FW	Amber Hearn	24 November 1984 (aged 28)	(German Football Association) USV Jena
10	FW	Sarah Gregorius	6 August 1987 (aged 25)	(German Football Association) Bad Neuenahr
12	MF	Betsy Hassett	4 August 1990 (aged 22)	(German Football Association) SC Sand
13	FW	Rosie White	6 June 1993 (aged 19)	(United States Soccer Federation) UCLA Bruins
15	DF	Rebekah Stott	17 June 1993 (aged 19)	(Football Australia) Melbourne Victory
17	FW	Hannah Wilkinson	28 May 1992 (aged 20)	(United States Soccer Federation) Tennessee Volunteers
18	MF	Katie Bowen	15 April 1994 (aged 18)	(United States Soccer Federation) North Carolina Tar Heels
19	MF	Holly Patterson	16 April 1994 (aged 18)	(New Zealand Football) Claudelands Rovers
20	FW	Helen Collins	3 October 1988 (aged 24)	Unttached
21	GK	Rebecca Rolls	22 August 1975 (aged 37)	(New Zealand Football) Three Kings United
	DF	Rebecca Smith (captain)	17 June 1981 (aged 31)	(German Football Association) VfL Wolfsburg
	DF	Bridgette Armstrong	9 November 1992 (aged 20)	Unattached
	MF	Annalie Longo	1 July 1991 (aged 21)	(New Zealand Football) Three Kings United
	MF	Kirsty Yallop	4 November 1986 (aged 26)	(Swedish Football Association) Vittsjö

=== Scotland ===
Coach: (Sweden) Anna Signeul

Rachael Small was called-up, but withdrew before the beginning of the competition.

No.	Pos.	Player	Date of birth (age)	Club
1	GK	Gemma Fay (captain)	9 December 1981 (aged 31)	(Scottish Football Association) Celtic
2	DF	Rhonda Jones	30 March 1979 (aged 33)	(Scottish Football Association) Celtic
3	FW	Suzanne Malone	4 October 1984 (aged 28)	(Scottish Football Association) Glasgow City
4	DF	Eilish McSorley	24 April 1993 (aged 19)	(Scottish Football Association) Glasgow City
5	MF	Leanne Ross	8 July 1981 (aged 31)	(Scottish Football Association) Glasgow City
6	MF	Joanne Love	6 December 1985 (aged 27)	(Scottish Football Association) Glasgow City
7	MF	Hayley Lauder	4 June 1990 (aged 22)	(Swedish Football Association) Mallbackens
8	MF	Kim Little	29 June 1990 (aged 22)	(The Football Association) Arsenal
9	MF	Megan Sneddon	9 September 1985 (aged 27)	(Scottish Football Association) Rangers
10	DF	Jen Beattie	13 May 1991 (aged 21)	(The Football Association) Arsenal
11	FW	Suzanne Grant	17 April 1984 (aged 28)	(The Football Association) Keynsham Town
12	GK	Shannon Lynn	22 October 1985 (aged 27)	(Scottish Football Association) Hibernian
13	FW	Jane Ross	18 September 1989 (aged 23)	(Swedish Football Association) Vittsjö
14	MF	Leanne Crichton	6 August 1987 (aged 25)	(Scottish Football Association) Glasgow City
15	MF	Joelle Murray	7 November 1986 (aged 26)	(Scottish Football Association) Hibernian
16	FW	Lisa Evans	21 May 1992 (aged 20)	(German Football Association) Turbine Potsdam
17	DF	Frankie Brown	8 October 1987 (aged 25)	(Scottish Football Association) Hibernian
18	FW	Emma Mitchell	19 September 1992 (aged 20)	(German Football Association) SGS Essen
19	DF	Nicola Docherty	23 August 1992 (aged 20)	(Scottish Football Association) Glasgow City
20	FW	Sarah Crilly	17 October 1991 (aged 21)	(Scottish Football Association) Hamilton Academical

== Group B ==
=== Canada ===
Coach: (England) John Herdman

The squad was announced on 22 February 2013.

No.	Pos.	Player	Date of birth (age)	Club
	GK	Stephanie Labbé	10 October 1986 (aged 26)	(Swedish Football Association) Örebro
	GK	Karina LeBlanc	30 March 1980 (aged 32)	(United States Soccer Federation) Portland Thorns
	GK	Erin McLeod	26 February 1983 (aged 30)	(United States Soccer Federation) Chicago Red Stars
	DF	Kadeisha Buchanan	5 November 1995 (aged 17)	(Canadian Soccer Association) Erin Mills Eagles
	DF	Carmelina Moscato	2 May 1984 (aged 28)	(United States Soccer Federation) Chicago Red Stars
	DF	Lauren Sesselmann	14 August 1983 (aged 29)	(United States Soccer Federation) Kansas City
	DF	Emily Zurrer	12 July 1987 (aged 25)	(United States Soccer Federation) Seattle Reign
	DF	Melanie Booth	24 August 1984 (aged 28)	(United States Soccer Federation) Sky Blue
	DF	Robyn Gayle	31 August 1985 (aged 27)	(United States Soccer Federation) Washington Spirit
	DF	Ashley Lawrence	11 June 1995 (aged 17)	(Canadian Soccer Association) Erin Mills Eagles
	DF	Bryanna McCarthy	13 October 1991 (aged 21)	(United States Soccer Federation) Western New York Flash
	DF	Chelsea Stewart	28 April 1990 (aged 22)	(United States Soccer Federation) UCLA Bruins
	DF	Rhian Wilkinson	12 May 1982 (aged 30)	(United States Soccer Federation) Boston Breakers
	MF	Tiffany Cameron	16 October 1991 (aged 21)	(United States Soccer Federation) Seattle Reign
	MF	Jonelle Filigno	24 September 1990 (aged 22)	(United States Soccer Federation) Rutgers Scarlet Knights
	MF	Kaylyn Kyle	6 October 1988 (aged 24)	(United States Soccer Federation) Seattle Reign
	MF	Diana Matheson	6 April 1984 (aged 28)	(United States Soccer Federation) Washington Spirit
	MF	Christabel Oduro	1 November 1992 (aged 20)	Unattached
	MF	Jodi-Ann Robinson	17 April 1989 (aged 23)	(United States Soccer Federation) Western New York Flash
	MF	Sophie Schmidt	28 June 1988 (aged 24)	(United States Soccer Federation) Sky Blue
	MF	Desiree Scott	31 July 1987 (aged 25)	(United States Soccer Federation) Kansas City
	MF	Brittany Timko	5 September 1985 (aged 27)	Unattached
	FW	Christina Julien	6 May 1988 (aged 24)	Unattached
	FW	Adriana Leon	2 October 1992 (aged 20)	(United States Soccer Federation) Boston Breakers
	FW	Christine Sinclair	12 June 1983 (aged 29)	(United States Soccer Federation) Portland Thorns

=== Finland ===
Coach: (Sweden) Andrée Jeglertz

The squad was announced on 19 February 2013. On 27 February 2013, Riikka Ketoja withdrew due to exams and was replaced by Ella Vanhanen. On 5 March 2013, during training, Linda Sällström sprained her knee and was ruled out for the tournament. On 7 March 2013, Adelina Engman withdrew due to exams and was replaced by Eveliina Parikka.

No.	Pos.	Player	Date of birth (age)	Club
1	GK	Minna Meriluoto	4 October 1985 (aged 27)	(Swedish Football Association) Jitex
2	DF	Maija Saari (captain)	26 March 1986 (aged 26)	(Swedish Football Association) Mallbackens
3	DF	Tuija Hyyrynen	10 March 1988 (aged 24)	(Swedish Football Association) Umeå
4	DF	Susanna Lehtinen	8 May 1983 (aged 29)	(Swedish Football Association) Örebro
5	MF	Tiina Saario	15 January 1982 (aged 31)	(Football Association of Finland) Åland United
6	DF	Laura Kivistö	26 June 1981 (aged 31)	(Football Association of Finland) PK-35 Vantaa
7	MF	Annika Kukkonen	12 April 1990 (aged 22)	(Swedish Football Association) Sunnanå
8	DF	Katri Nokso-Koivisto	22 November 1982 (aged 30)	(Norwegian Football Federation) LSK Kvinner
9	FW	Marianna Tolvanen	27 December 1992 (aged 20)	(Football Association of Finland) Honka
10	MF	Emmi Alanen	30 April 1991 (aged 21)	(Football Association of Finland) Kokkola F10
11	MF	Pernilla Nordlund	10 October 1990 (aged 22)	(Swedish Football Association) Umeå Södra
12	GK	Siiri Välimaa	10 April 1990 (aged 22)	(Football Association of Finland) NiceFutis
13	MF	Heidi Kivelä	6 November 1988 (aged 24)	(Football Association of Finland) PK-35 Vantaa
14	FW	Sanna Talonen	15 June 1984 (aged 28)	(Swedish Football Association) Örebro
15	FW	Leena Puranen	18 October 1986 (aged 26)	(Swedish Football Association) Jitex
16	DF	Anna Westerlund	9 April 1989 (aged 23)	(Swedish Football Association) Piteå
17	MF	Jaana Lyytikäinen	22 October 1982 (aged 30)	(Football Association of Finland) Åland United
18	FW	Eveliina Parikka	12 August 1990 (aged 22)	(Football Association of Finland) PK-35 Vantaa
19	FW	Adelina Engman	11 October 1994 (aged 18)	(Football Association of Finland) Åland United
20	MF	Nora Heroum	20 July 1994 (aged 18)	(Football Association of Finland) Honka
21	FW	Ella Vanhanen	15 September 1993 (aged 19)	(Football Association of Finland) Pallokissat
22	DF	Pirjo Leppikangas	12 September 1987 (aged 25)	(Football Association of Finland) PK-35 Vantaa
23	GK	Tinja-Riikka Korpela	5 May 1986 (aged 26)	(Norwegian Football Federation) LSK Kvinner
	FW	Linda Sällström	13 July 1988 (aged 24)	(Swedish Football Association) Linköping

=== Netherlands ===
Coach: Roger Reijners

The squad was announced on 27 February 2013. On 2 March 2013, Desiree van Lunteren and Mandy Versteegt withdrew due to injury and no replacements were called-up instead of them.

No.	Pos.	Player	Date of birth (age)	Club
1	GK	Loes Geurts	12 January 1986 (aged 27)	(Swedish Football Association) Vittsjö
2	DF	Dyanne Bito	10 August 1981 (aged 31)	(Royal Dutch Football Association) Telstar
7	MF	Sylvia Smit	4 July 1986 (aged 26)	(Royal Dutch Football Association) PEC Zwolle
9	FW	Manon Melis	31 August 1981 (aged 31)	(Swedish Football Association) Malmö
10	MF	Maayke Heuver	26 July 1990 (aged 22)	(Royal Dutch Football Association) Twente
12	DF	Leonne Stentler	23 April 1986 (aged 26)	(Royal Dutch Football Association) Ajax
13	MF	Daniëlle van de Donk	5 August 1991 (aged 21)	(Royal Dutch Football Association) PSV/FC Eindhoven
14	FW	Chantal de Ridder	19 January 1989 (aged 24)	(Royal Dutch Football Association) Ajax
15	DF	Daphne Koster	13 March 1981 (aged 31)	(Royal Dutch Football Association) Ajax
16	GK	Angela Christ	6 March 1989 (aged 23)	(Royal Dutch Football Association) PSV/FC Eindhoven
17	DF	Siri Worm	20 April 1992 (aged 20)	(Royal Dutch Football Association) Twente
18	DF	Stefanie van der Gragt	16 August 1992 (aged 20)	(Royal Dutch Football Association) Telstar
19	MF	Tessel Middag	23 December 1992 (aged 20)	(Royal Dutch Football Association) Ajax
20	MF	Kelly Zeeman	19 November 1993 (aged 19)	(Royal Dutch Football Association) Telstar
22	MF	Lieke Martens	16 December 1992 (aged 20)	(German Football Association) FCR 2001 Duisburg
23	GK	Sari van Veenendaal	3 April 1990 (aged 22)	(Royal Dutch Football Association) Twente
24	MF	Anouk Dekker	15 November 1986 (aged 26)	(Royal Dutch Football Association) Twente
	GK	Laura du Ry	13 August 1992 (aged 20)	(Royal Dutch Football Association) Ajax
	DF	Mandy van den Berg	26 August 1990 (aged 22)	(Swedish Football Association) Vittsjö
	DF	Kim Dolstra	4 November 1988 (aged 24)	(Royal Dutch Football Association) Telstar
	DF	Claudia van den Heiligenberg	25 March 1985 (aged 27)	(Royal Dutch Football Association) Telstar
	DF	Mirte Roelvink	23 November 1985 (aged 27)	(German Football Association) FSV Gütersloh 2009
	MF	Jolijn Heuvels	22 August 1986 (aged 26)	(Royal Dutch Football Association) PEC Zwolle
	MF	Anouk Hoogendijk	6 May 1985 (aged 27)	(Royal Dutch Football Association) Ajax
	MF	Marlous Pieëte	19 July 1989 (aged 23)	(Royal Dutch Football Association) Twente
	MF	Renée Slegers	5 February 1989 (aged 24)	(Swedish Football Association) Linköping
	MF	Sherida Spitse	29 May 1990 (aged 22)	(Royal Dutch Football Association) Twente
	FW	Priscilla de Vos	14 January 1987 (aged 26)	(Royal Dutch Football Association) Telstar

=== Switzerland ===
Coach: (Germany) Martina Voss-Tecklenburg

No.	Pos.	Player	Date of birth (age)	Club
1	GK	Jennifer Oehrli	13 January 1989 (aged 24)	(Swiss Football Association) Basel
2	DF	Nicole Remund	31 December 1989 (aged 23)	(Swiss Football Association) Zürich
3	DF	Sandra Betschart	30 March 1989 (aged 23)	(German Football Association) VfL Sindelfingen
4	MF	Audrey Wuichet	29 June 1995 (aged 17)	(Swiss Football Association) Yverdon
5	DF	Noelle Maritz	23 December 1995 (aged 17)	(Swiss Football Association) Zürich
6	DF	Selina Kuster	8 August 1991 (aged 21)	(Swiss Football Association) Grasshopper
7	MF	Martina Moser	9 April 1986 (aged 26)	(German Football Association) 1899 Hoffenheim
8	MF	Sandy Maendly	4 April 1988 (aged 24)	(Italian Football Federation) Torres
9	MF	Lia Wälti	19 April 1993 (aged 19)	(Swiss Football Association) BSC YB
10	FW	Ramona Bachmann	25 December 1990 (aged 22)	(Swedish Football Association) Malmö
11	MF	Lara Dickenmann	27 November 1985 (aged 27)	(French Football Federation) Lyon
12	GK	Gaëlle Thalmann	18 January 1986 (aged 27)	(Italian Football Federation) Torres
13	MF	Ana-Maria Crnogorčević	3 October 1990 (aged 22)	(German Football Association) FFC Frankfurt
14	DF	Rahel Kiwic	5 January 1991 (aged 22)	(Swiss Football Association) Zürich
15	DF	Caroline Abbé (captain)	13 January 1988 (aged 25)	(German Football Association) SC Freiburg
16	FW	Fabienne Humm	20 December 1986 (aged 26)	(Swiss Football Association) Zürich
17		Lara Minder		
18	FW	Vanessa Bürki	1 April 1986 (aged 26)	(German Football Association) Bayern Munich
19	DF	Daniela Schwarz	9 September 1985 (aged 27)	(Norwegian Football Federation) Kolbotn
20	MF	Claudia Stilz	28 March 1986 (aged 26)	(Swiss Football Association) Staad
22	MF	Vanessa Bernauer	23 March 1988 (aged 24)	(Royal Spanish Football Federation) Levante
23	MF	Fabienne Bangerter	21 September 1991 (aged 21)	(Swiss Football Association) Basel

== Group C ==
=== Northern Ireland ===
Coach: Alfie Wylie

No.	Pos.	Player	Date of birth (age)	Club
1	GK	Emma Higgins	15 May 1986 (aged 26)	(The Football Association) Doncaster Rovers Belles
2	DF	Alexandra Hurst	25 November 1994 (aged 18)	
3	DF	Demi Vance	2 May 1991 (aged 21)	(Irish Football Association) Glentoran
4	MF	Nadene Caldwell	24 January 1991 (aged 22)	(Irish Football Association) Glentoran
5	DF	Julie Nelson	4 June 1985 (aged 27)	(The Football Association) Everton
7	FW	Marissa Callaghan	2 September 1985 (aged 27)	(Irish Football Association) Cliftonville
8	MF	Lynda Shepherd	5 May 1985 (aged 27)	(The Football Association) Manchester City
9	FW	Simone Magill	1 November 1994 (aged 18)	(Irish Football Association) Mid-Ulster
10	MF	Aoife Lennon	4 March 1993 (aged 19)	
11	MF	Kelly Gallagher	3 December 1989 (aged 23)	
13	DF	Alana McShane	9 February 1995 (aged 18)	
14	MF	Danielle McDowell	3 July 1986 (aged 26)	(Irish Football Association) Crusaders Strikers
15	DF	Lisa Armour	23 December 1991 (aged 21)	(Irish Football Association) Crusaders Strikers
18	FW	Clare Carson	19 January 1983 (aged 30)	
19	DF	Laura Rafferty	29 April 1996 (aged 16)	(The Football Association) Southampton Academy

=== Republic of Ireland ===
Coach: Susan Ronan

The squad was announced on 22 February 2013. The following week, Fiona O'Sullivan withdrew due to a knee injury and was replaced by Deirdre Doherty. A few days later, Julie-Ann Russell withdrew die to a quad injury and was replaced by Rachel Graham. The following day, Emma Byrne was appointed as captain, replacing Ciara Grant who had announced her retirement from international football.

No.	Pos.	Player	Date of birth (age)	Caps	Goals	Club
	GK	Emma Byrne	14 June 1979 (aged 33)	93	0	(The Football Association) Arsenal
	GK	Eve Badana	9 July 1993 (aged 19)	2	0	(United States Soccer Federation) Drexel Dragons
	DF	Yvonne Tracy	27 February 1981 (aged 32)	70	3	(The Football Association) Arsenal
	DF	Megan Campbell	28 June 1993 (aged 19)	12	0	(Football Association of Ireland) Raheny United
	DF	Grace Murray	26 May 1989 (aged 23)	7	0	(Football Association of Ireland) Peamount United
	DF	Louise Quinn	17 June 1990 (aged 22)	17	1	(Swedish Football Association) Eskilstuna United
	DF	Jessica Gleeson	23 October 1993 (aged 19)	0	0	(Football Association of Ireland) Wexford Youths
	DF	Seana Cooke	6 July 1989 (aged 23)	0	0	(Football Association of Ireland) Raheny United
	DF	Méabh De Búrca	11 August 1988 (aged 24)	23	0	(Norwegian Football Federation) Amazon Grimstad
	DF	Diane Caldwell	11 September 1988 (aged 24)	20	0	(Norwegian Football Federation) Avaldsnes
	MF	Ciara Grant	17 May 1978 (aged 34)	102	11	(Football Association of Ireland) Raheny United
	MF	Karen Duggan	29 May 1991 (aged 21)	0	0	(Football Association of Ireland) Peamount United
	MF	Emma Hansberry	26 May 1994 (aged 18)	0	0	(Football Association of Ireland) Castlebar Celtic
	MF	Rachel Graham	18 July 1989 (aged 23)	0	0	(Football Association of Ireland) Raheny United
	MF	Áine O'Gorman	13 May 1989 (aged 23)	52	4	(Football Association of Ireland) Peamount United
	MF	Shannon Smyth	22 June 1987 (aged 25)	17	0	(Norwegian Football Federation) Amazon Grimstad
	FW	Deirdre Doherty	14 March 1991 (aged 21)	0	0	(Football Association of Ireland) IT Sligo
	FW	Ruesha Littlejohn	3 July 1990 (aged 22)	7	0	(Scottish Football Association) Glasgow City
	FW	Noelle Murray	25 December 1989 (aged 23)	0	0	(Football Association of Ireland) Raheny United
	FW	Sara Lawlor	11 November 1987 (aged 25)	3	0	(Football Association of Ireland) Peamount United
	FW	Stephanie Roche	13 June 1989 (aged 23)	14	2	(Football Association of Ireland) Peamount United
	FW	Denise O'Sullivan	4 February 1994 (aged 19)	13	4	(Football Association of Ireland) Cork

=== South Africa ===
Coach: Joseph Mkhonza

A 28-player preliminary squad was announced on 15 February 2013. The following week, the final 22-player squad was announced.

No.	Pos.	Player	Date of birth (age)	Club
1	GK	Andile Dlamini	2 September 1992 (aged 20)	(South African Football Association) Mamelodi Sundowns
2	DF	Lebogang Mabatle	3 March 1992 (aged 21)	(South African Football Association) Hallelujah Zebra Force
3	DF	Nothando Vilakazi	28 October 1988 (aged 24)	(South African Football Association) Palace Super Falcons
4	FW	Jermaine Seoposenwe	12 October 1993 (aged 19)	(South African Football Association) University of the Western Cape
5	DF	Janine van Wyk	17 April 1987 (aged 25)	(South African Football Association) Palace Super Falcons
6	DF	Zamandosi Cele	26 December 1990 (aged 22)	(South African Football Association) Durban Ladies
7	DF	Nomathemba Ntsibande	19 April 1986 (aged 26)	(South African Football Association) Springs Home Sweepers
8	FW	Silindile Ngubane	25 March 1987 (aged 25)	(South African Football Association) Durban Ladies
9	MF	Amanda Dlamini	22 July 1988 (aged 24)	(South African Football Association) University of Johannesburg
10	MF	Marry Ntsweng	19 December 1989 (aged 23)	(South African Football Association) TUT Ladies
11	FW	Noko Matlou	30 September 1985 (aged 27)	(South African Football Association) University of Johannesburg
12	MF	Robyn Moodaly	16 June 1994 (aged 18)	(South African Football Association) Alexandra Ladies
13	MF	Gabisile Hlumbane	20 December 1986 (aged 26)	(South African Football Association) Kovsies Ladies
14	MF	Refiloe Jane	4 August 1992 (aged 20)	(South African Football Association) Mamelodi Sundowns
15	GK	Kaylin Swart	30 September 1994 (aged 18)	(South African Football Association) University of the Western Cape
16	FW	Andisiwe Mgcoyi	16 June 1988 (aged 24)	(South African Football Association) Mamelodi Sundowns
17	MF	Nocawe Skiti	13 May 1989 (aged 23)	(South African Football Association) Cape Town Roses
18	MF	Zanele Chiya	30 March 1991 (aged 21)	(South African Football Association) TUT Ladies
19	GK	Mahlatsi Mogola	29 May 1991 (aged 21)	(South African Football Association) TUT Ladies
20		Vuyo Mkhabela	30 July 1994 (aged 18)	(South African Football Association) University of the Western Cape
21	MF	Gloria Thato	11 January 1989 (aged 24)	(South African Football Association) Tuks Ladies
22	FW	Shiwe Nogwanya	7 March 1994 (aged 18)	(South African Football Association) Bloemfontein Celtic

=== South Korea ===
Coach: Yoon Deok-yeo

The squad was announced on 18 February 2013.

No.	Pos.	Player	Date of birth (age)	Club
	GK	Kim Seu-ri	17 April 1988 (aged 24)	(Korea Football Association) Sportstoto
	GK	Kim Jung-mi	16 October 1984 (aged 28)	(Korea Football Association) Incheon Hyundai Steel Red Angels
	DF	Lee Eun-mi	18 August 1988 (aged 24)	(Korea Football Association) Icheon Daekyo
	DF	Shim Seo-yeon	15 April 1989 (aged 23)	(Korea Football Association) Icheon Daekyo
	DF	Lim Seon-joo	27 November 1990 (aged 22)	(Korea Football Association) Incheon Hyundai Steel Red Angels
	DF	Jeong Yeong-a	9 December 1990 (aged 22)	(Korea Football Association) Seoul City
	DF	Kim Hye-ri	25 June 1990 (aged 22)	(Korea Football Association) Seoul City
	DF	Jang Sel-gi	31 May 1994 (aged 18)	(Korea Football Association) Gangwon State University
	DF	Kim Ji-hye	4 May 1992 (aged 20)	(Korea Football Association) Sportstoto
	DF	Park Han-na		(Korea Football Association) Suwon FMC
	MF	Kim Na-rae	1 June 1990 (aged 22)	(Korea Football Association) Suwon FMC
	MF	Kwon Hah-nul	7 March 1988 (aged 24)	(Korea Football Association) Busan Sangmu
	MF	Cha Yun-hee	26 February 1986 (aged 27)	(Korea Football Association) Icheon Daekyo
	MF	Cho So-hyun	24 June 1988 (aged 24)	(Korea Football Association) Incheon Hyundai Steel Red Angels
	MF	Lee So-dam	12 October 1994 (aged 18)	(Korea Football Association) Ulsan College
	MF	Ji Sun-mi	9 April 1991 (aged 21)	(Korea Football Association) Sportstoto
	MF	Jeoun Eun-ha	28 January 1993 (aged 20)	(Korea Football Association) Jeonbuk KSPO
	MF	Lee Geum-min	7 April 1994 (aged 18)	(Korea Football Association) Ulsan College
	FW	Kim Sang-eun	31 December 1991 (aged 21)	(Korea Football Association) Jeonbuk KSPO
	FW	Park Hee-young	11 June 1985 (aged 27)	(Korea Football Association) Jeonbuk KSPO
	FW	Jeon Ga-eul	14 September 1988 (aged 24)	(Korea Football Association) Incheon Hyundai Steel Red Angels
	FW	Jung Seol-bin	6 January 1990 (aged 23)	(Korea Football Association) Incheon Hyundai Steel Red Angels
	FW	Ji So-yun	21 February 1991 (aged 22)	(Japan Football Association) INAC Kobe Leonessa

== Player representation ==
Statistics are per the beginning of the competition.

=== By club ===
Clubs with 5 or more players represented are listed.

Players	Club
10	(England) Arsenal
8	(Italy) Torres
7	(Scotland) Glasgow City
6	(Italy) Brescia, (Netherlands) Ajax, (Netherlands) Telstar, (Netherlands) Twente
5	(Italy) Graphistudio Tavagnacco, (Republic of Ireland) Peamount United, (Republic of Ireland) Raheny United, (South Korea) Incheon Hyundai Steel Red Angels

=== By club nationality ===
Players	Clubs
26	England
23	Italy, United States
22	Netherlands, South Africa, South Korea, Sweden
17	Germany
14	Republic of Ireland, Scotland
11	Finland
10	Switzerland
6	Norway
4	New Zealand
2	Australia, Canada
1	France, Japan, Russia, Spain

=== By club federation ===
Players	Federation
168	UEFA
25	AFC
25	CONCACAF
22	CAF
4	OFC

=== By representatives of domestic league ===
National squad	Players
Netherlands	22
South Africa	22
South Korea	22
England	21
Italy	21
Republic of Ireland	14
Scotland	13
Finland	11
Switzerland	10
New Zealand	4
Canada	2
