= List of AFC Ajax (women) players =

This list includes past and present footballers who have played/play for AFC Ajax (women).

== List of players ==
Name	Nationality	Position	Ajax career	Captaincy	Notes
Nicky Van Den Abbeele	Belgium	Midfielder	2017–2018	—	
Lucie Akkerman	Netherlands	Defender	2018–2021	—	
Jamie Altelaar	Netherlands	Defender	2022–present	—	
Daria Antończyk	Poland	Goalkeeper	2013–2014	—	
Eshly Bakker	Netherlands	Forward	2012–2016; 2018–2023	—	
Linda Bakker	Netherlands	Midfielder	2012–2014; 2017–2022	—	
Sabine Becx	Netherlands	Forward	2012–2013	—	
Marjolijn van den Bighelaar	Netherlands	Forward	2013–2022	—	
Zaina Bouzerrade	Morocco / Netherlands	Defender	2020–2022	—	
Justine Brandau	Netherlands	Defender	2020–2021	—	
Annebel ten Broeke	Netherlands	Forward	2012–2013	—	
Stephanie Bukovec	Croatia / Canada	Goalkeeper	2019–2020	—	
Fiene Bussman	Netherlands	Goalkeeper	2020–2023	—	
Isa Dekker	Netherlands	Midfielder	2021–2022	—	
Lauren Delleman	Netherlands	Defender	2012–2017	—	
Samantha van Diemen	Netherlands	Defender	2019–2021	—	
Caitlin Dijkstra	Netherlands	Defender	2018–2021	—	
Claire Dinkla	Netherlands	Goalkeeper	2020–2021	—	
Merel van Dongen	Netherlands	Midfielder	2015–2018	—	
Lisa Doorn	Netherlands	Defender	2018–2023	—	
Chelly Drost	Netherlands	Midfielder	2012–2013	—	
Regina van Eijk	Netherlands	Goalkeeper	2020–2023	—	
Kika van Es	Netherlands	Defender	2018–2019	—	
Sisca Folkertsma	Netherlands	Forward	2017–2018	—	
Rosa van Gool	Netherlands	Forward	2021–present	—	
Stefanie van der Gragt	Netherlands	Defender	2017–2018; 2020–2022	—	
Chasity Grant	Netherlands / Suriname	Forward	2020–2024	—	
Jip van Haaster	Netherlands	Midfielder	2012–2013	—	
Betsy Hassett	New Zealand	Midfielder	2016–2017	—	
Claudia van den Heiligenberg	Netherlands	Midfielder	2013–2015	—	
Gwyneth Hendriks	Netherlands	Defender	2018–2019	—	
Ziva Henry	Netherlands / Indonesia	Forward	2020–2021	—	
Bodil van den Heuvel	Netherlands	Midfielder	2020–2021	—	
Isabelle Hoekstra	Netherlands / Suriname	Forward	2020–present	—	
Tiny Hoekstra	Netherlands	Forward	2021–present	—	
Petra Hogewoning	Netherlands	Defender	2012–2016	—	
Maxime Hoksbergen	Netherlands	Goalkeeper	2012–2013	—	
Anouk Hoogendijk	Netherlands	Midfielder	2012–2014; 2014–2017	—	
Lieke Huls	Netherlands	Defender	2012–2013	—	
Bente Jansen	Netherlands	Forward	2023–present	—	
Ellen Jansen	Netherlands	Forward	2018–2020	—	
Inessa Kaagman	Netherlands	Defender	2013–2018	—	
Julia Kagie	Netherlands	Midfielder	2018–2019	—	
Isa Kardinaal	Netherlands	Defender	2021–present	—	
Milicia Keijzer	Netherlands	Defender	2021–present	—	
Lindsey Keizerweerd	Netherlands / Suriname	Forward	2017–2018	—	
Lotte Keukelaar	Netherlands	Forward	2023–present	—	
Daliyah de Klonia	Netherlands / Suriname	Defender	2023–present	—	
Lize Kop	Netherlands	Goalkeeper	2017–2023	—	
Daphne Koster	Netherlands	Defender	2012–2017	—	
Elisha Kruize	Netherlands / Ghana	Forward	2022–2023	—	
Romée Leuchter	Netherlands	Forward	2021–2024	—	
Vanity Lewerissa	Netherlands / Indonesia	Forward	2018–2021	—	
Vita van der Linden	Netherlands	Defender	2015–2019	—	
Desiree van Lunteren	Netherlands	Midfielder	2012–2018; 2019–2021	—	
Carmen Manduapessy	Netherlands / Indonesia	Midfielder	2012–2014	—	
Suzanne Marees	Netherlands	Defender	2014–2015	—	
Alex Melin	United States	Midfielder	2014–2015	—	
Tessel Middag	Netherlands	Midfielder	2012–2016	—	
Liza van der Most	Netherlands / Colombia	Midfielder	2012–2023	—	
Kim Mourmans	Netherlands	Midfielder	2018–2019	—	
Marthe Munsterman	Netherlands	Midfielder	2018–2023	—	
Lois Niënhuis	Netherlands	Goalkeeper	2023–present	—	
Nadine Noordam	Netherlands	Midfielder	2021–present	—	
Danique Noordman	Netherlands	Midfielder	2023–present	—	
Nienke Olthof	Netherlands	Goalkeeper	2012–2013	—	
Joni Paliama	Netherlands / Indonesia	Midfielder	2022–2023	—	
Toni Payne	Nigeria / United States	Forward	2016–2018	—	
Victoria Pelova	Netherlands / Bulgaria	Midfielder	2019–2022	—	
Davina Philtjens	Belgium	Defender	2016–2018	—	
Marlous Pieëte	Netherlands	Forward	2014–2017	—	
Isa Pothof	Netherlands	Goalkeeper	2021–2022	—	
Paulina Quaye	Netherlands / Suriname	Goalkeeper	2014–2017	—	
Lucienne Reichardt	Netherlands	Midfielder	2016–2018	—	
Chantal de Ridder	Netherlands	Forward	2013–2019	—	
Mei Wei Rispens	Netherlands / China	Goalkeeper	2021–2022	—	
Ana Romero	Spain	Forward	2016–2018	—	
Babiche Roof	Netherlands	Midfielder	2012–2014	—	
Donna van Rossum	Netherlands	Midfielder	2013–2013	—	
Line Røddik	Denmark	Defender	2018–2019	—	
Laura du Ry	Netherlands	Goalkeeper	2012–2016	—	
Quinty Sabajo	Netherlands / Suriname	Midfielder	2020–present	—	
Iina Salmi	Finland	Midfielder	2018–2020	—	
Kay-lee de Sanders	Netherlands / Suriname	Defender	2017–present	—	
Eli Sarasola	Spain	Goalkeeper	2015–2018	—	
Loïs Schenkel	Netherlands	Midfielder	2014–2019	—	
Romy Scherpenzeel	Netherlands	Defender	2012–2013	—	
Aukje van Seijst	Netherlands	Goalkeeper	2017–2019	—	
Whitney Sharpe	United States	Defender	2013–2014	—	
Sherida Spitse	Netherlands	Defender	2021–present	—	
Leonne Stentler	Netherlands	Defender	2012–2015	—	
Iris Stiekema	Netherlands	Midfielder	2021–present	—	
Pascalle Tang	Netherlands / Suriname	Defender	2012–2015	—	
Danique Tolhoek	Netherlands	Forward	2023–present	—	
Nikita Tromp	Netherlands	Forward	2018–2019; 2020–2024	—	
Deau den Turk	Netherlands	Defender	2022–present	—	
Marieke Ubachs	Netherlands	Goalkeeper	2012–2015; 2017–2019	—	
Roos van der Veen	Netherlands	Defender	2022–present	—	
Jonna van de Velde	Netherlands	Midfielder	2018–present	—	
Vesna Veltrop	Netherlands	Midfielder	2012–2013	—	
Soraya Verhoeve	Aruba / Netherlands	Forward	2016–present	—	
Mandy Versteegt	Netherlands	Forward	2012–2016	—	
Manique de Vette	Netherlands	Defender	2020–2021	—	
Lucie Voňková	Czech Republic	Forward	2019–2021	—	
Dominique Vugts	Netherlands	Forward	2016–2017	—	
Dionne van der Wal	Netherlands	Goalkeeper	2022–present	—	
Ashleigh Weerden	Netherlands / Suriname	Forward	2022–2024	—	
Kirsten van de Westeringh	Netherlands	Midfielder	2018–2020	—	
Lily Yohannes	United States / Eritrea	Midfielder	2023–present	—	
Kelly Zeeman	Netherlands	Midfielder	2013–2021; 2021–2022	—	

== National team players ==
The following players were called-up to represent their national teams in international football and received caps during their tenure with AFC Ajax:

- **Aruba**
  - (Aruba) Soraya Verhoeve (2016–2024)
- **Belgium**
  - (Belgium) Nicky Van Den Abbeele (2017–2018)
  - (Belgium) Davina Philtjens (2016–2018)
- **Czech Republic**
  - (Czech Republic) Lucie Voňková (2019–2021)
- **Denmark**
  - (Denmark) Line Røddik (2018–2019)
- **Finland**
  - (Finland) Iina Salmi (2018–2020)
- **Morocco**
  - (Morocco) Zaina Bouzerrade (2020–2022)
- **Netherlands**
  - (Netherlands) Eshly Bakker (2012–2016, 2018–2023)
  - (Netherlands) Merel van Dongen (2015–2018)
  - (Netherlands) Lisa Doorn (2018–2023)
  - (Netherlands) Kika van Es (2018–2019)
  - (Netherlands) Sisca Folkertsma (2017–2018)
  - (Netherlands) Stefanie van der Gragt (2017–2018, 2020–2022)
  - (Netherlands) Chasity Grant (2020–2024)
- **Netherlands** (continued)
  - (Netherlands) Claudia van den Heiligenberg (2013–2015)
  - (Netherlands) Petra Hogewoning (2012–2016)
  - (Netherlands) Anouk Hoogendijk (2012–2014, 2014–2017)
  - (Netherlands) Ellen Jansen (2018–2020)
  - (Netherlands) Lize Kop (2017–2023)
  - (Netherlands) Daphne Koster (2012–2017)
  - (Netherlands) Romée Leuchter (2021–2024)
  - (Netherlands) Desiree van Lunteren (2012–2018, 2019–2021)
  - (Netherlands) Tessel Middag (2012–2016)
  - (Netherlands) Liza van der Most (2012–2023)
  - (Netherlands) Victoria Pelova (2019–2022)
  - (Netherlands) Marlous Pieëte (2014–2017)
  - (Netherlands) Chantal de Ridder (2013–2019)
  - (Netherlands) **Sherida Spitse (2021–present)**
  - (Netherlands) Leonne Stentler (2012–2015)
  - (Netherlands) Mandy Versteegt (2012–2016)
  - (Netherlands) Kelly Zeeman (2013–2021, 2021–2022)
- **New Zealand**
  - (New Zealand) Betsy Hassett (2016–2017)
- **Poland**
  - (Poland) Daria Antończyk (2013–2014)
- **United States**
  - (United States) Lily Yohannes (2023–2025)

- Players in bold actively play for Ajax and for their respective national teams. Years in brackets indicate career span with Ajax.

=== National team players by Confederation ===
Member associations are listed in order of most to fewest current and former Ajax players represented internationally

Total national team players by confederation
Confederation	Total	(Nation) Association
AFC	0	
CAF	1	Morocco (1)
CONCACAF	2	Aruba (1), United States (1)
CONMEBOL	0	
OFC	1	New Zealand (1)
UEFA	30	Netherlands (24), Belgium (2), Czech Republic (1), Denmark (1), Finland (1), Poland (1)

== Players in international tournaments ==
The following is a list of Ajax women players who have competed in international tournaments, including the FIFA Women's World Cup, UEFA Women's Championship, UEFA Women's Nations League Finals. To this date no Ajax players have participated in the AFC Women's Asian Cup, CONCACAF Women's Nations League Finals, CONCACAF W Championship, the Copa América Femenina, Women's Africa Cup of Nations or the OFC Women's Nations Cup while playing for Ajax.

Cup	Players
(Sweden) UEFA Women's Euro 2013	(Netherlands) Anouk Hoogendijk (Netherlands) Daphne Koster (Netherlands) Desiree van Lunteren (Netherlands) Chantal de Ridder (Netherlands) Leonne Stentler (Netherlands) Mandy Versteegt
(Canada) 2015 FIFA Women's World Cup	(Netherlands) Merel van Dongen (Netherlands) Petra Hogewoning (Netherlands) Anouk Hoogendijk (Netherlands) Desiree van Lunteren (Netherlands) Tessel Middag
(Netherlands) UEFA Women's Euro 2017	(Netherlands) Sisca Folkertsma (Netherlands) Stefanie van der Gragt (Netherlands) Desiree van Lunteren (Netherlands) Liza van der Most (Belgium) Davina Philtjens (Netherlands) Kelly Zeeman
(France) 2019 FIFA Women's World Cup	(Netherlands) Kika van Es (Netherlands) Ellen Jansen (Netherlands) Lize Kop (Netherlands) Liza van der Most
(England) UEFA Women's Euro 2022	(Netherlands) Stefanie van der Gragt (Netherlands) Romée Leuchter (Netherlands) Victoria Pelova (Netherlands) Sherida Spitse
(Australia) (New Zealand) 2023 FIFA Women's World Cup	(Netherlands) Lize Kop (Netherlands) Sherida Spitse
(France) (Netherlands) (Spain) 2024 UEFA Women's Nations League Finals	(Netherlands) Chasity Grant (Netherlands) Romée Leuchter (Netherlands) Sherida Spitse

== See also ==
- Category:AFC Ajax (women) players
- AFC Ajax Vrouwen § Current squad
