= 2012 Cyprus Women's Cup squads =

List of players competing at the 5th edition of the Cyprus Women's Cup

This article lists the squads for the 2012 Cyprus Women's Cup, the 5th edition of the Cyprus Women's Cup. The cup consisted of a series of friendly games, and was held in Cyprus from 28 February to 6 March 2012. The twelve national teams involved in the tournament registered a squad of 23 players.

The age listed for each player is on 28 February 2012, the first day of the tournament. The numbers of caps and goals listed for each player do not include any matches played after the start of tournament. The club listed is the club for which the player last played a competitive match prior to the tournament. The nationality for each club reflects the national association (not the league) to which the club is affiliated. A flag is included for coaches that are of a different nationality than their own national team.

== Group A ==
=== England ===
Coach: Hope Powell

No.	Pos.	Player	Date of birth (age)	Club
	GK	Karen Bardsley	14 October 1984 (aged 27)	(Swedish Football Association) Linköpings
	GK	Rachel Brown	2 July 1980 (aged 31)	(The Football Association) Everton
	GK	Siobhan Chamberlain	15 August 1983 (aged 28)	(The Football Association) Bristol Academy
	GK	Carly Telford	7 July 1987 (aged 24)	(The Football Association) Chelsea
	DF	Anita Asante	27 April 1985 (aged 26)	(Swedish Football Association) Göteborg
	DF	Laura Bassett	2 August 1983 (aged 28)	(The Football Association) Birmingham City
	DF	Sophie Bradley	20 October 1989 (aged 22)	(The Football Association) Lincoln
	DF	Steph Houghton	23 April 1988 (aged 23)	(The Football Association) Arsenal
	DF	Alex Scott	14 October 1984 (aged 27)	(The Football Association) Arsenal
	DF	Casey Stoney	13 May 1982 (aged 29)	(The Football Association) Lincoln
	DF	Dunia Susi	10 August 1987 (aged 24)	(The Football Association) Chelsea
	DF	Rachel Unitt	5 June 1982 (aged 29)	(The Football Association) Birmingham City
	DF	Fern Whelan	5 December 1988 (aged 23)	(The Football Association) Everton
	MF	Karen Carney	1 August 1987 (aged 24)	(The Football Association) Birmingham City
	MF	Jess Clarke	5 May 1989 (aged 22)	(The Football Association) Lincoln
	MF	Jade Moore	22 October 1990 (aged 21)	(The Football Association) Birmingham City
	MF	Jill Scott	2 February 1987 (aged 25)	(The Football Association) Everton
	MF	Sue Smith	24 November 1979 (aged 32)	(The Football Association) Doncaster Rovers Belles
	MF	Fara Williams	25 January 1984 (aged 28)	(The Football Association) Everton
	FW	Kelly Smith	29 October 1978 (aged 33)	(The Football Association) Arsenal
	FW	Rachel Williams	10 January 1988 (aged 24)	(The Football Association) Birmingham City
	FW	Ellen White	9 May 1989 (aged 22)	(The Football Association) Arsenal

=== Finland ===
Coach: (Sweden) Andrée Jeglertz

No.	Pos.	Player	Date of birth (age)	Club
	GK	Tinja-Riikka Korpela	5 May 1986 (aged 25)	(Norwegian Football Federation) LSK Kvinner
	GK	Minna Meriluoto	4 October 1985 (aged 26)	(Swedish Football Association) Jitex
	DF	Tuija Hyyrynen	10 March 1988 (aged 23)	(Swedish Football Association) Umeå
	DF	Maija Saari	26 March 1986 (aged 25)	(Swedish Football Association) AIK
	DF	Anna Westerlund	9 April 1989 (aged 22)	(Swedish Football Association) Piteå
	MF	Emmi Alanen	30 April 1991 (aged 20)	(Football Association of Finland) Kokkola F10
	MF	Katri Nokso-Koivisto	22 November 1982 (aged 29)	(Swedish Football Association) Jitex
	MF	Pernilla Nordlund	10 October 1990 (aged 21)	(Swedish Football Association) Umeå
	MF	Maiju Ruotsalainen	25 November 1983 (aged 28)	(Football Association of Finland) Åland United
	MF	Tiina Saario	15 January 1982 (aged 30)	(Football Association of Finland) HJK
	MF	Essi Sainio	9 September 1986 (aged 25)	(German Football Association) SC Freiburg
	FW	Annika Kukkonen	12 April 1990 (aged 21)	(Swedish Football Association) Djurgården
	FW	Leena Puranen	16 October 1986 (aged 25)	(Swedish Football Association) Jitex
	FW	Sanna Talonen	15 June 1984 (aged 27)	(Swedish Football Association) Örebro
	FW	Linda Sällström	13 July 1988 (aged 23)	(Swedish Football Association) Linköpings
	FW	Marianna Tolvanen	27 December 1992 (aged 19)	(Football Association of Finland) HJK

=== France ===
Coach: Bruno Bini

No.	Pos.	Player	Date of birth (age)	Club
	GK	Sarah Bouhaddi	17 October 1986 (aged 25)	(French Football Federation) Lyon
	GK	Céline Deville	24 January 1982 (aged 30)	(French Football Federation) Lyon
	GK	Laëtitia Philippe	30 April 1991 (aged 20)	(French Football Federation) Montpellier
	DF	Laure Boulleau	22 October 1986 (aged 25)	(French Football Federation) Paris Saint-Germain
	DF	Kelly Gadéa	16 December 1991 (aged 20)	(French Football Federation) Montpellier
	DF	Laura Georges	20 August 1984 (aged 27)	(French Football Federation) Lyon
	DF	Ophélie Meilleroux	18 January 1984 (aged 28)	(French Football Federation) Montpellier
	DF	Wendie Renard	20 July 1990 (aged 21)	(French Football Federation) Lyon
	MF	Camille Abily	5 December 1984 (aged 27)	(French Football Federation) Lyon
	MF	Sonia Bompastor	8 June 1980 (aged 31)	(French Football Federation) Lyon
	MF	Élise Bussaglia	24 September 1985 (aged 26)	(French Football Federation) Paris Saint-Germain
	MF	Corine Franco	5 October 1983 (aged 28)	(French Football Federation) Lyon
	MF	Louisa Nécib	23 January 1987 (aged 25)	(French Football Federation) Lyon
	MF	Sandrine Soubeyrand	16 August 1973 (aged 38)	(French Football Federation) Juvisy
	MF	Gaëtane Thiney	28 October 1985 (aged 26)	(French Football Federation) Juvisy
	FW	Camille Catala	6 May 1991 (aged 20)	(French Football Federation) Saint-Étienne
	FW	Marie-Laure Delie	29 January 1988 (aged 24)	(French Football Federation) Montpellier
	FW	Eugénie Le Sommer	18 May 1989 (aged 22)	(French Football Federation) Lyon
	FW	Marina Makanza	1 July 1991 (aged 20)	(German Football Association) SC Freiburg
	FW	Élodie Thomis	13 August 1986 (aged 25)	(French Football Federation) Lyon

=== Switzerland ===
Coach: (Germany) Martina Voss-Tecklenburg

No.	Pos.	Player	Date of birth (age)	Club
1	GK	Marisa Brunner	28 May 1982 (aged 29)	(German Football Association) SC Freiburg
2	DF	Marie-Andrea Egli	11 January 1989 (aged 23)	(Swiss Football Association) Kriens
3	DF	Sandra Betschart	30 March 1989 (aged 22)	(Swiss Football Association) Yverdon
5	DF	Marina Keller	23 February 1984 (aged 28)	(Royal Spanish Football Federation) Sant Gabriel
6	DF	Selina Kuster	8 August 1991 (aged 20)	(Swiss Football Association) Grasshopper
7	MF	Martina Moser	9 April 1986 (aged 25)	(German Football Association) VfL Wolfsburg
8	FW	Sandy Maendly	4 April 1988 (aged 23)	(Italian Football Federation) Torres
11	MF	Lara Dickenmann	27 November 1985 (aged 26)	(French Football Federation) Lyon
13	MF	Ana-Maria Crnogorčević	3 October 1990 (aged 21)	(German Football Association) FFC Frankfurt
15	DF	Caroline Abbé (captain)	13 January 1988 (aged 24)	(German Football Association) SC Freiburg
17	FW	Lara Keller	13 April 1991 (aged 20)	(Swiss Football Association) Kriens
18	FW	Vanessa Bürki	1 April 1986 (aged 25)	(German Football Association) Bayern Munich
19	DF	Daniela Schwarz	9 September 1985 (aged 26)	(Swiss Football Association) Grasshopper
21	GK	Pascale Küffer	13 November 1992 (aged 19)	(Swiss Football Association) Schlieren
22	MF	Valérie Gillioz	18 July 1987 (aged 24)	(Swiss Football Association) Yverdon
23	DF	Rahel Kiwic	5 January 1991 (aged 21)	(Swiss Football Association) Zürich
	MF	Rahel Graf	1 February 1989 (aged 23)	(Swiss Football Association) Kriens
	MF	Jehona Mehmeti	25 September 1990 (aged 21)	(Swiss Football Association) Basel
	MF	Lia Wälti	19 April 1993 (aged 18)	(Swiss Football Association) Young Boys

== Group B ==
=== Canada ===
Coach: (England) John Herdman

The squad was announced on 22 February 2012.

No.	Pos.	Player	Date of birth (age)	Club
	GK	Karina LeBlanc	30 March 1980 (aged 31)	Unattached
	GK	Erin McLeod	26 February 1983 (aged 29)	(Swedish Football Association) Dalsjöfors GoIF
	GK	Stephanie Labbé	10 October 1986 (aged 25)	(Swedish Football Association) Piteå
	DF	Candace Chapman	2 April 1983 (aged 28)	Unattached
	DF	Carmelina Moscato	2 May 1984 (aged 27)	(Swedish Football Association) Piteå
	DF	Shannon Woeller	31 January 1990 (aged 22)	(United States Soccer Federation) Rutgers Scarlet Knights
	DF	Melanie Booth	24 August 1984 (aged 27)	(Canadian Soccer Association) Vancouver Whitecaps
	DF	Robyn Gayle	31 October 1985 (aged 26)	(Canadian Soccer Association) Vancouver Whitecaps
	DF	Marie-Ève Nault	16 February 1982 (aged 30)	(Canadian Soccer Association) Ottawa Fury
	DF	Lauren Sesselmann	14 August 1983 (aged 28)	Unattached
	DF	Chelsea Stewart	28 April 1990 (aged 21)	(United States Soccer Federation) UCLA Bruins
	DF	Rhian Wilkinson	12 May 1982 (aged 29)	(Norwegian Football Federation) Lillestrøm
	DF	Bryanna McCarthy	13 October 1991 (aged 20)	(Canadian Soccer Association) Toronto Lady Lynx
	DF	Emily Zurrer	12 July 1987 (aged 24)	(Swedish Football Association) Dalsjöfors GoIF
	MF	Kaylyn Kyle	6 October 1988 (aged 23)	(Canadian Soccer Association) Vancouver Whitecaps
	MF	Alyscha Mottershead	2 May 1991 (aged 20)	(United States Soccer Federation) Syracuse Orange
	MF	Kelly Parker	8 March 1981 (aged 30)	Unattached
	MF	Ranee Premji	8 July 1991 (aged 20)	(United States Soccer Federation) North Carolina Tar Heels
	MF	Sophie Schmidt	28 June 1988 (aged 23)	Unattached
	MF	Desiree Scott	31 July 1987 (aged 24)	(Canadian Soccer Association) Vancouver Whitecaps
	MF	Brittany Timko	5 September 1985 (aged 26)	Unattached
	FW	Chelsea Buckland	20 January 1990 (aged 22)	(United States Soccer Federation) Oregon State Beavers
	FW	Tiffany Cameron	16 October 1991 (aged 20)	(United States Soccer Federation) Ohio State Buckeyes
	FW	Christina Julien	6 May 1988 (aged 23)	(Swedish Football Association) Jitex
	FW	Christine Sinclair	12 June 1983 (aged 28)	Unattached
	FW	Melissa Tancredi	27 December 1981 (aged 30)	(Swedish Football Association) Piteå

=== Italy ===
Coach: Pietro Ghedin

The squad was announced on 22 February 2012.

No.	Pos.	Player	Date of birth (age)	Club
1	GK	Anna Maria Picarelli	4 November 1984 (aged 27)	(United States Soccer Federation) Pali Blues
2	DF	Giorgia Motta	18 March 1984 (aged 27)	(Italian Football Federation) Torres
3	DF	Roberta D'Adda	5 October 1981 (aged 30)	(Italian Football Federation) Brescia
4	MF	Alessia Tuttino	15 March 1983 (aged 28)	(Italian Football Federation) Tavagnacco
5	DF	Elisabetta Tona	22 January 1984 (aged 28)	(Italian Football Federation) Torres
6	DF	Laura Neboli	14 March 1988 (aged 23)	(German Football Association) FCR 2001 Duisburg
7	MF	Giulia Domenichetti	29 April 1984 (aged 27)	(Italian Football Federation) Chiasiellis
8	FW	Melania Gabbiadini	23 August 1983 (aged 28)	(Italian Football Federation) Bardolino Verona
9	FW	Patrizia Panico	8 February 1975 (aged 37)	(Italian Football Federation) Torres
10	MF	Pamela Conti	4 April 1982 (aged 29)	(Russian Football Union) Zorky
11	MF	Alice Parisi	11 December 1990 (aged 21)	(Italian Football Federation) Tavagnacco
12	GK	Arianna Criscione	18 February 1985 (aged 27)	(Italian Football Federation) Torres
13	DF	Raffaella Manieri	26 November 1986 (aged 25)	(Italian Football Federation) Torres
14	FW	Sandy Iannella	6 April 1987 (aged 24)	(Italian Football Federation) Torres
15	FW	Barbara Bonansea	13 June 1991 (aged 20)	(Italian Football Federation) Torino
16	DF	Viviana Schiavi	1 September 1982 (aged 29)	(Italian Football Federation) Brescia
17	FW	Daniela Sabatino	26 June 1985 (aged 26)	(Italian Football Federation) Brescia
18	MF	Valentina Boni	14 March 1983 (aged 28)	(Italian Football Federation) Brescia
19	MF	Laura Fusetti	8 October 1990 (aged 21)	(Italian Football Federation) Como
20	MF	Elisa Camporese	16 March 1984 (aged 27)	(Italian Football Federation) Tavagnacco
21	DF	Alia Guagni	1 October 1987 (aged 24)	(Italian Football Federation) Firenze
22	GK	Sara Penzo	16 December 1989 (aged 22)	(Swiss Football Association) Basel

=== Netherlands ===
Coach: Roger Reijners

A preliminary squad was announced on 2 February 2012. The squad was trimmed on 8 February 2012 ahead of a preparation friendly against France. The final squad was selected on 22 February 2012, after Daphne Koster withdrew due to injury and was replaced by Sylvia Nooij.

No.	Pos.	Player	Date of birth (age)	Club
1	GK	Loes Geurts	12 January 1986 (aged 26)	(Royal Dutch Football Association) Telstar
2	DF	Dyanne Bito	10 August 1981 (aged 30)	(Royal Dutch Football Association) Telstar
3	DF	Sylvia Nooij	9 November 1984 (aged 27)	(Royal Dutch Football Association) ADO Den Haag
4	DF	Mandy van den Berg	26 August 1990 (aged 21)	(Royal Dutch Football Association) ADO Den Haag
5	DF	Petra Hogewoning	26 March 1986 (aged 25)	(German Football Association) FCR 2001 Duisburg
6	MF	Anouk Hoogendijk	6 May 1985 (aged 26)	(Royal Dutch Football Association) Utrecht
7	FW	Sylvia Smit	4 July 1986 (aged 25)	(Royal Dutch Football Association) PEC Zwolle
8	MF	Sherida Spitse	29 May 1990 (aged 21)	(Royal Dutch Football Association) Heerenveen
9	FW	Manon Melis	31 August 1986 (aged 25)	(Swedish Football Association) Linköpings
10	MF	Kirsten van de Ven	11 May 1985 (aged 26)	(Swedish Football Association) Tyresö
11	FW	Lieke Martens	16 December 1992 (aged 19)	(German Football Association) FCR 2001 Duisburg
12	DF	Kika van Es	11 October 1991 (aged 20)	(Royal Dutch Football Association) VVV-Venlo
13	DF	Mirte Roelvink	23 November 1985 (aged 26)	(German Football Association) FF USV Jena
14	DF	Claudia van den Heiligenberg	25 March 1985 (aged 26)	(Royal Dutch Football Association) Telstar
15	MF	Desiree van Lunteren	30 December 1992 (aged 19)	(Royal Dutch Football Association) Telstar
16	GK	Angela Christ	6 March 1989 (aged 22)	(Royal Dutch Football Association) Utrecht
17	MF	Tessel Middag	23 December 1992 (aged 19)	(Royal Dutch Football Association) ADO Den Haag
18	MF	Tessa Oudejans	21 October 1991 (aged 20)	(Royal Dutch Football Association) Utrecht
19	FW	Nangila van Eyck	13 July 1984 (aged 27)	(Royal Dutch Football Association) Heerenveen
20	MF	Maayke Heuver	26 July 1990 (aged 21)	(Royal Dutch Football Association) Twente
21	FW	Marlous Pieëte	19 July 1989 (aged 22)	(Royal Dutch Football Association) Twente
23	GK	Sari van Veenendaal	3 April 1990 (aged 21)	(Royal Dutch Football Association) Twente

=== Scotland ===
Coach: (Sweden) Anna Signeul

The squad was announced on 4 January 2012.

No.	Pos.	Player	Date of birth (age)	Club
	GK	Gemma Fay	9 December 1981 (aged 30)	(Scottish Football Association) Celtic
	GK	Shannon Lynn	22 October 1985 (aged 26)	(Scottish Football Association) Hibernian
	GK	Khym Ramsay	11 November 1989 (aged 22)	(Scottish Football Association) Rangers
	DF	Jennifer Beattie	13 May 1991 (aged 20)	(The Football Association) Arsenal
	DF	Frankie Brown	8 October 1987 (aged 24)	(Scottish Football Association) Hibernian
	DF	Rachel Corsie	17 August 1989 (aged 22)	(Scottish Football Association) Glasgow City
	DF	Ifeoma Dieke	25 February 1981 (aged 31)	(Cyprus Football Association) Apollon Limassol
	DF	Nicola Docherty	23 August 1992 (aged 19)	(Scottish Football Association) Glasgow City
	DF	Emma Fernon	12 March 1987 (aged 24)	(Scottish Football Association) Glasgow City
	DF	Rhonda Jones	30 March 1979 (aged 32)	(Scottish Football Association) Celtic
	DF	Emma Mitchell	19 September 1992 (aged 19)	(Scottish Football Association) Glasgow City
	DF	Joelle Murray	7 November 1986 (aged 25)	(Scottish Football Association) Hibernian
	MF	Lisa Evans	21 May 1992 (aged 19)	(Scottish Football Association) Glasgow City
	MF	Hayley Lauder	4 June 1990 (aged 21)	(Scottish Football Association) Spartans
	MF	Kim Little	29 June 1990 (aged 21)	(The Football Association) Arsenal
	MF	Suzanne Lappin	13 October 1986 (aged 25)	(The Football Association) Liverpool
	MF	Joanne Love	6 December 1985 (aged 26)	(Scottish Football Association) Glasgow City
	MF	Alana Marshall	29 April 1987 (aged 24)	(Scottish Football Association) Rangers
	MF	Christie Murray	3 May 1990 (aged 21)	(Scottish Football Association) Glasgow City
	MF	Leanne Ross	8 July 1981 (aged 30)	(Scottish Football Association) Glasgow City
	MF	Megan Sneddon	9 September 1985 (aged 26)	(Scottish Football Association) Celtic
	MF	Rachael Small	20 December 1991 (aged 20)	(Scottish Football Association) Forfar Farmington
	FW	Rebecca Dempster	10 February 1991 (aged 21)	(Scottish Football Association) Hibernian
	FW	Suzanne Grant	17 April 1984 (aged 27)	(The Football Association) Keynsham Town
	FW	Jane Ross	18 September 1989 (aged 22)	(Scottish Football Association) Glasgow City

== Group C ==
=== New Zealand ===
Coach: (England) Tony Readings

The squad was announced on 24 February 2012.

No.	Pos.	Player	Date of birth (age)	Caps	Goals	Club
1	GK	Jenny Bindon	25 February 1973 (aged 39)	61	0	(New Zealand Football) Hibiscus Coast
2	DF	Ria Percival	7 December 1989 (aged 22)	60	7	(German Football Association) FFC Frankfurt
3	DF	Anna Green	20 August 1990 (aged 21)	42	5	(Austrian Football Association) Lokomotive Leipzig
4	MF	Katie Hoyle	1 February 1988 (aged 24)	52	1	(German Football Association) Bad Neuenahr
5	DF	Abby Erceg	20 November 1989 (aged 22)	63	4	(Football Australia) Adelaide United
6	DF	Rebecca Smith (captain)	17 June 1981 (aged 30)	59	3	(German Football Association) VfL Wolfsburg
7	DF	Ali Riley	30 October 1987 (aged 24)	53	1	Unattached
8	MF	Hayley Moorwood	13 February 1984 (aged 28)	70	7	(The Football Association) Chelsea
9	FW	Amber Hearn	28 November 1984 (aged 27)	50	23	(German Football Association) FF USV Jena
10	FW	Sarah Gregorius	6 August 1987 (aged 24)	18	9	(German Football Association) Bad Neuenahr
11	MF	Kirsty Yallop	4 November 1986 (aged 25)	51	11	(Swedish Football Association) Vittsjö
12	MF	Betsy Hassett	4 August 1990 (aged 21)	28	3	(United States Soccer Federation) California Golden Bears
13	FW	Rosie White	6 June 1993 (aged 18)	31	7	(United States Soccer Federation) UCLA Bruins
14	DF	Holly Patterson	16 April 1994 (aged 17)	0	0	(New Zealand Football) Claudelands Rovers
15	FW	Emma Kete	1 September 1987 (aged 24)	42	3	(Football Australia) Canberra United
16	MF	Annalie Longo	1 July 1991 (aged 20)	33	0	(New Zealand Football) Three Kings United
17	FW	Hannah Wilkinson	28 May 1992 (aged 19)	25	10	(New Zealand Football) Glenfield Rovers
18	MF	Katie Bowen	15 April 1994 (aged 17)	6	0	(New Zealand Football) Glenfield Rovers
19	DF	Kristy Hill	1 July 1979 (aged 32)	17	0	(New Zealand Football) Three Kings United
20	GK	Rebecca Rolls	22 August 1975 (aged 36)	11	0	(New Zealand Football) Metro

=== Northern Ireland ===
Coach: Alfie Wylie

=== South Africa ===
Coach: Joseph Mkhonza

A preliminary squad was announced on 8 January 2012. A training squad was selected for a camp in Brazil on 10 February 2012. On 23 February 2012, the final squad was announced with Nompumelelo Nyandeni and Kylie Louw replacing Zanele Sukazi and Nocawe Skiti, while Mputle Ntshatsana withdrew due to an injury and was replaced by Nkosingiphile Zungu.

No.	Pos.	Player	Date of birth (age)	Club
	GK	Thokozile Mndaweni	8 August 1981 (aged 30)	(South African Football Association) Croesus
	GK	Roxanne Barker	6 May 1991 (aged 20)	(United States Soccer Federation) Pepperdine Waves
	GK	Nkosingiphile Zungu	30 January 1993 (aged 19)	(South African Football Association) Barcelona
	DF	Gabisile Hlumbane	20 December 1986 (aged 25)	(South African Football Association) Kovsies
	DF	Janine van Wyk	17 April 1987 (aged 24)	(South African Football Association) Palace Super Falcons
	DF	Refiloe Jane	4 August 1992 (aged 19)	(South African Football Association) Mamelodi Sundowns
	DF	Amanda Sister	1 March 1990 (aged 21)	(South African Football Association) Liverpool BTX
	DF	Zamandosi Cele	26 December 1990 (aged 21)	(South African Football Association) Durban
	DF	Simphiwe Masina	26 July 1985 (aged 26)	(South African Football Association) Detroit
	DF	Nothando Vilakazi	28 October 1988 (aged 23)	(South African Football Association) Palace Super Falcons
	MF	Marry Ntsweng	19 December 1989 (aged 22)	(South African Football Association) Tshwane University of Technology
	MF	Memory Makhanya	3 November 1988 (aged 23)	(South African Football Association) Durban
	MF	Nomathemba Ntsibande	19 April 1986 (aged 25)	(South African Football Association) Springs Home Sweepers
	MF	Chuene Morifi	13 February 1991 (aged 21)	
	MF	Nondyebo Mgudu	29 January 1989 (aged 23)	(South African Football Association) Durban
	MF	Nompumelelo Nyandeni	19 August 1987 (aged 24)	(Russian Football Union) Rossiyanka
	MF	Kylie Louw	15 January 1989 (aged 23)	(United States Soccer Federation) Stephen F. Austin Ladyjacks
	FW	Sanah Mollo	30 January 1987 (aged 25)	(South African Football Association) Bloemfontein Celtic
	FW	Noko Matlou	30 September 1985 (aged 26)	(South African Football Association) University of Johannesburg
	FW	Leandra Smeda	22 July 1989 (aged 22)	(South African Football Association) Cape Town Roses
	FW	Amanda Dlamini (captain)	22 July 1988 (aged 23)	(South African Football Association) University of Johannesburg
	FW	Andisiwe Mgcoyi	16 June 1988 (aged 23)	(South African Football Association) Cape Town Roses

=== South Korea ===
Coach: Park Nam-yeol

The squad was announced on 1 February 2012.

No.	Pos.	Player	Date of birth (age)	Club
1	GK	Jun Min-kyung	16 January 1985 (aged 27)	(Korea Football Association) Icheon Daekyo
2	DF	Seo Hyun-sook	6 January 1992 (aged 20)	(Korea Football Association) Icheon Daekyo
3	DF	Lee Eun-mi	18 August 1988 (aged 23)	(Korea Football Association) Icheon Daekyo
4	DF	Sim Seo-yeon	15 April 1989 (aged 22)	(Korea Football Association) Icheon Daekyo
5	DF	Lim Seon-joo	27 November 1990 (aged 21)	(Korea Football Association) Incheon Hyundai Steel Red Angels
6	MF	Kim Yeo-jin	7 August 1993 (aged 18)	(Korea Football Association) Ulsan College
7	FW	Cha Yun-hee	26 February 1986 (aged 26)	(Korea Football Association) Icheon Daekyo
8	MF	Kwon Hah-nul	7 March 1988 (aged 23)	(Korea Football Association) Busan Sangmu
9	FW	Ji So-yun	21 February 1991 (aged 21)	(Japan Football Association) INAC Kobe Leonessa
10	FW	Kim Soo-yun	30 August 1989 (aged 22)	(Korea Football Association) Gumi Sportstoto
11	MF	Lee Jang-mi	14 November 1985 (aged 26)	(Korea Football Association) Icheon Daekyo
12	MF	Lee Min-a	8 November 1991 (aged 20)	(Korea Football Association) Incheon Hyundai Steel Red Angels
13	FW	Yeo Min-ji	27 April 1993 (aged 18)	(Korea Football Association) Ulsan College
14	MF	Cho So-hyun	24 June 1988 (aged 23)	(Korea Football Association) Incheon Hyundai Steel Red Angels
15	MF	Ji Dong-won	9 April 1991 (aged 20)	(Korea Football Association) Gumi Sportstoto
16	MF	Kim Na-ri	28 March 1993 (aged 18)	(Korea Football Association) Hanyang Women's University
17	DF	Kim Sang-eun	31 December 1991 (aged 20)	(Korea Football Association) Hwacheon KSPO
18	FW	Park Ji-young	12 May 1988 (aged 23)	(Korea Football Association) Gumi Sportstoto
19	DF	Hwang Bo-ram	6 October 1987 (aged 24)	(Korea Football Association) Icheon Daekyo
20	DF	Kim Hye-ri	25 June 1990 (aged 21)	(Korea Football Association) Seoul WFC
21	GK	Kim Seu-ri	17 April 1988 (aged 23)	(Korea Football Association) Busan Sangmu
22	DF	Park Han-na	21 July 1992 (aged 19)	(Korea Football Association) Yeoju Institute of Technology

== Player representation ==
Statistics are per the beginning of the competition.

=== By club ===
Clubs with 5 or more players represented are listed.

Players	Club
11	(France) Lyon
9	(Scotland) Glasgow City
7	(Italy) Torres, (South Korea) Icheon Daekyo
6	(England) Arsenal
5	(England) Birmingham City

=== By club nationality ===
Players	Clubs
25	England
21	South Korea, Sweden
20	France, Scotland
19	Italy
18	South Africa
17	Netherlands
16	Germany
12	Switzerland
11	United States
7	New Zealand
6	Canada
4	Finland
2	Australia, Norway, Russia
1	Austria, Cyprus, Japan, Spain

=== By club federation ===
Players	Federation
161	UEFA
24	AFC
18	CAF
17	CONCACAF
7	OFC

=== By representatives of domestic league ===
National squad	Players
South Korea	21
England	20
Scotland	20
France	19
Italy	18
South Africa	18
Netherlands	17
Switzerland	11
New Zealand	7
Canada	6
Finland	4
