= Acqua Minerale San Benedetto =

Italian beverage manufacturer

Acqua Minerale San Benedetto S.p.A.
- Type: Società per azioni
- Industry: Beverage
- Founded: 1956; 70 years ago in Scorzè, Italy
- Headquarters: Scorzè, Venice, Italy
- Products: Mineral water, non-alcoholic beverages
- Revenue: €756 million (2017)
- Number of employees: 1,953
- Subsidiaries: Acqua di Nepi S.p.A., l'Agua Mineral San Benedetto S.A.
- Website: www.sanbenedetto.it

Acqua Minerale San Benedetto S.p.A. is an Italian multinational company based in Scorzè, Venice. It produces non-alcoholic beverages such as mineral water and carbonated and non-carbonated soft drinks, in Italy and worldwide.

San Benedetto has six production sites in Italy (Scorzè, Popoli, Donato, Nepi, Viggianello, Atella), two in Spain, one in Poland and one in Hungary. In 2018, it employed a staff of 1,953 worldwide and had 44 bottling lines in Italy, and a production capacity of 4.49 billion bottles a year. It is controlled by the Zoppas family of industrialists through the holding company Finanziaria S. Benedetto S.p.A.

== History ==
The first plant for bottling mineral water from the San Benedetto and Guizza springs in Scorzè dates back to 1956, and was founded by the brothers Bruno and Ermenegildo (known as Ilo) Scattolin, who owned a food shop and the land on which the spring is found. The company takes its name from the spring of the same name, which has been renowned as a source of health since the times of the Venetian Republic. In 1959, the company became a joint-stock company, with the Scattolin family retaining majority holding, while bringing in distant relatives with a 33% interest: the Zoppas family, who in those years were developing their household appliances company of the same name. Augusto Zoppas became president of the company, of which majority holding remained with the Scattolin family.

In 1971, when the household appliance company was in the throes of a crisis and its founder Luigi had died for a year, the Zoppas family acquired the majority interest of San Benedetto, which had some financial issues. Enrico Zoppas was appointed Managing Director and Giuliano De Polo, the son-in-law of Augusto Zoppas, became President. Enrico Zoppas took up also the presidency in 2004, after De Polo's passing.

=== Growth ===
In 1984, the company signed an agreement with Cadbury Schweppes International and began to produce and distribute the entire range of Schweppes products in Italy. In 1988 a franchising agreement was signed with PepsiCo to produce and market the range of the Pepsi and 7 Up brands in Italy.

In 1995, a new plant was opened in Popoli, where the Guizza Fonte Valle Reale mineral water is bottled. The company then launched the sport drink Energade on the market.

In early 2000, through an agreement of equal cooperation between San Benedetto and Danone, the companies Polska Woda in Poland, and Magyarviz Kft. in Hungary, were established. In 2002 an agreement was signed for the production and packaging of Coca-Cola products for the European market.

Franco-American activist Olivia Maurel and San Benedetto drinks in 2020

In 2006, Enrico, Gianfranco, Renzo, Maria Teresa, Sara, Federico and Matteo Zoppas reached an agreement to purchase the shares of the other members of the Zoppas family, so as to hold 100% of the holding Finanziaria San Benedetto at the head of the San Benedetto Mineral Water Group.

In 2010, San Benedetto acquired from Danone the remaining 50% of the two companies that produced and sold mineral water and soft drinks in Poland and Hungary, becoming the sole shareholder. In 2014 San Benedetto built a new plant in Viggianello to bottle San Benedetto mineral water from the Pollino National Park.
