= Rio San Martino =

- Frazione
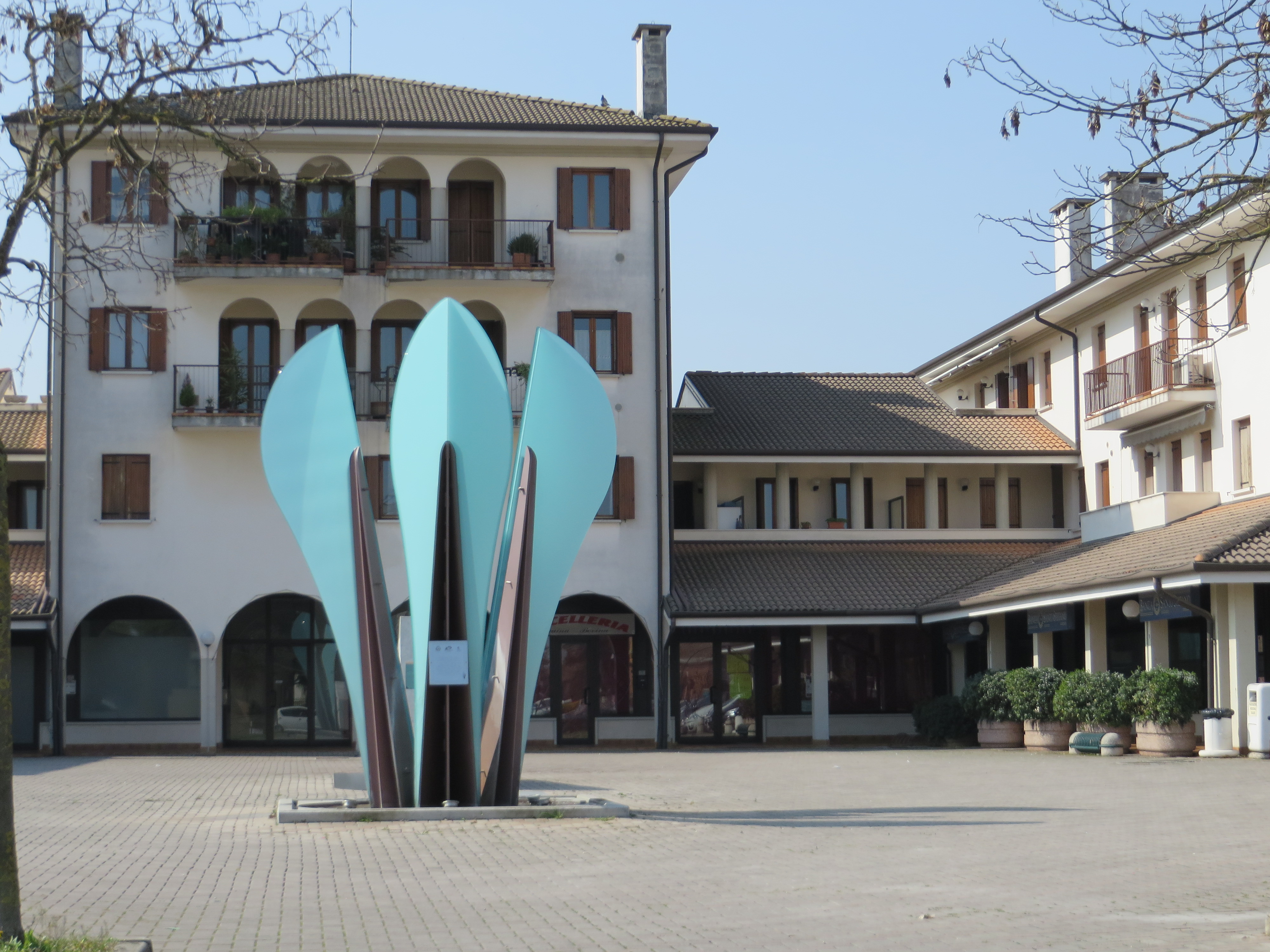

- Location of Rio San Martino in Italy
- Coordinates: 45°35′20″N 12°06′40″E
- Country: Italy
- Region: Veneto
- Province: Venice
- Elevation: 13 m (43 ft)

Population (31 December 2016)
  - Total: 2 122
- Time zone: UTC+1 (CET)
  - Summer (DST): UTC+2 (CEST)
- Postal code: 30037
- Dialing code: 041
- Patron saint: San Martino
- Saint day: 11 November

Rio San Martino (Venetian: Rio San Martin [ˈrio san marˈtin]) is a small town which belongs to the municipality of Scorzè in the province of Venice.

== History ==
There are very few historical information about Rio San Martino, reflecting the poor relevance of the town. Probable the Roman origin, since the center of the village rises near the intersection between a cardo and a decumanus of the Roman centuriation. The place names of Gallese and Sermazza (today Capitellon) could refer to two barbaric settlements, respectively of Gauls and Sarmatian.

Rio San Martino is mentioned in 1152 as a chapel dependent on the parish church of Zero.

During the Republic of Venice, the villa of Rio San Martino was divided into five districts (Rio San Martin Galese, Rio San Martin di Sopra, Rio San Martin di Mezo, Rio San Martin Sarmazza, Rio San Martin Church).

== Monuments and places of interest ==
=== Parish church ===
In ancient times was a chapel of the parish church of Zero, from 1560 it has its own rector.

The current building was consecrated on 20 April 1512. Restored in 1761, it was significantly modified in 1958 with enlargement works. Inside is preserved the San Martino altarpiece and the poor attributed to Sante Peranda, while the ceiling fresco (Apotheosis of San Martino), and the one above the entrance (David playing the harp in front of Saul), were commissioned in 1811 to Giovanni Carlo Bevilacqua. Other works by the same author have been lost: the Madonna del Rosario canvas between San Vincenzo and San Domenico and the frescoes La Fede, Speranza and Carità and the Sacrifice of Abraham. The frescoes of the presbytery are by prof. Soligo (1950–1952). The organ, by Domenico Malvestio, built at the beginning of the twentieth century, comes from the archpriest church of Noale.

The bell tower is from 1846 to 1856.

== Culture ==
=== Festivals and events ===
- Festival of radicchio: from the second to the fourth week of November
