= Casablanca Declaration (anti-surrogacy) =

Anti-surrogacy human rights document

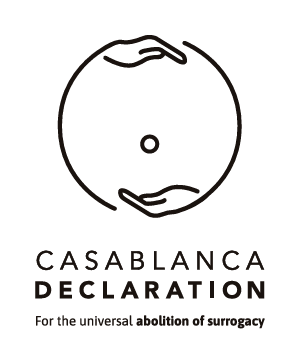
- Ratified: 3 March 2023
- Location: Casablanca, Morocco
- Signatories: 100 signatories
- Purpose: To abolish surrogacy in all circumstances

The Casablanca Declaration is a human rights manifesto and NGO created from 100 experts, including jurists, doctors, psychologists, and philosophers, that advocates the abolition of surrogacy in all circumstances, arguing that this practice violates human dignity and contributes to the commodification of women and children. It was signed on 3 March 2023 in Casablanca, Morocco.

Its spokesperson is Olivia Maurel, a French-American anti-surrogacy activist.
