= Arianna Criscione =

Italian footballer (born 1985)

Personal information
- Full name: Arianna Marcala Criscione
- Date of birth: 18 February 1985 (age 41)
- Place of birth: Whittier, California, United States
- Height: 1.79 m (5 ft 10 in)
- Position: Goalkeeper

Youth career
- Southern California Blues

College career
| Years | Team | Apps | (Gls) |
| 2003–2004 | UCLA Bruins | | |
| 2005–2006 | Boston College Eagles | | |

Senior career*
| Years | Team | Apps | (Gls) |
| 2005–2006 | Boston Renegades | | |
| 2008 | Danmarks IF | | |
| 2009–2014 | Torres | | |
| 2014–2015 | FC Twente | 2 | (0) |
| 2015–2016 | AS Saint-Étienne | 2 | (0) |
| 2016 | FL Fart | 2 | (0) |
| 2016 | Kungsbacka DFF | 11 | (0) |
| 2017–2018 | US Saint-Malo | 4 | (0) |
| 2019–2021 | Paris Saint-Germain | 0 | (0) |

International career^{‡}
| 2011–2014 | Italy | 3 | (0) |
- * Club domestic league appearances and goals as of 20:19, 17 December 2022 (UTC) ‡ National team caps and goals as of 20:19, 17 December 2022 (UTC)

Arianna Marcala Criscione (born 18 February 1985) is an Italian American former professional soccer goalkeeper who played for clubs in the United States, Italy, France, Sweden, the Netherlands and Norway. She spent five years with women's Serie A club Torres and won three caps with the Italy women's national football team.

== Club career ==
Criscione played four years of college soccer, two years each for UCLA Bruins and Boston College Eagles, in the United States' NCAA tournament. She also played for the USL W-League club Boston Renegades in 2005 and 2006. In 2008 she played for the Swedish Norrettan club Danmarks IF.

In a successful five-year spell with Torres from 2009 to 2014, Criscione collected three Serie A winner's medals, one Coppa Italia winner's medal, and four Supercoppa Italiana winner's medals.

Criscione was called into a training camp with the Western New York Flash ahead of their 2014 season, following an injury to their regular goalkeeper Ad Franch. In July 2014 she joined FC Twente of the BeNe League, but was unable to dislodge Twente's celebrated goalkeeper Sari van Veenendaal and negotiated a mutual release in January 2015 after making two appearances.

AS Saint-Étienne of the French Division 1 Féminine signed Criscione in January 2015. A month after arrival she sustained a serious knee injury. She moved on to Norwegian 1. divisjon club FL Fart in June 2016, where she made two appearances. She then returned to Swedish football, where she made 11 appearances for Kungsbacka DFF in the 2016 Elitettan.

Criscione returned to French football in August 2017, with Division 2 Féminine outfit US Saint-Malo. Her husband was employed as a coach with Stade Rennais at the time and Criscione hoped to relaunch her own career with a nearby club. Criscione did not enjoy Saint-Malo, so left and began studying a master's degree with the Football Business Academy and undertook a placement at Benfica.

In 2019 a chance meeting with Bruno Cheyrou on an aeroplane led to a contract offer from Paris Saint-Germain Féminine, where she was employed as a player and had an off-field role as sponsorship manager. In June 2021 she left PSG and ended her playing career.

== International career ==
Criscione attended several youth national team training camps with the United States. After moving to Italy she was included in Italy women's national football team coach Pietro Ghedin's initial 26-player list for UEFA Women's Euro 2009, but was one of four players to miss out on the final 22-player selection.

In December 2011 Criscione made her first appearance for Italy in a 6–0 win over Chile at the 2011 International Women's Football Tournament of City of São Paulo. She made further appearances against Scotland in the 2012 Cyprus Cup and Finland in the 2014 Cyprus Cup.
