= Scorzè =

- Comune
- Comune di Scorzè
- Location within Italy Location within Veneto
- Coordinates: 45°34′19″N 12°6′32″E
- Country: Italy
- Region: Veneto
- Metropolitan city: Venice (VE)
- Frazioni: Cappella, Gardigiano, Peseggia, Rio San Martino

Area
  - Total: 33 km^{2} (13 sq mi)
- Elevation: 16 m (52 ft)

Population (February 2018)
  - Total: 18,843
  - Density: 570/km^{2} (1,500/sq mi)
- Demonym: Scorzetani
- Time zone: UTC+1 (CET)
  - Summer (DST): UTC+2 (CEST)
- Postal code: 30037
- Dialing code: 041
- Patron saint: Saint Benedict
- Website: Official website

Scorzè is a comune in the Metropolitan City of Venice, in the Italian region of Veneto, located about 25 kilometres (16 mi) northwest of Venice.

The country is bordered by Zero Branco, Trebaseleghe, Venezia, Noale and Salzano.

The municipality of Scorzè contains many hamlets which are: Rio San Martino, Peseggia, Cappella, and Gardigiano.

It is situated on an area inhabited since the Paleovenetian era, then colonized by the Romans. In the Middle Ages it was a feud of the bishops of Treviso, who had as vassals in the territory several families, in particular the Tempesta and the Scorzadis; then part of the Serenissima; since 1866, after the treaty of Vienna becomes a comune in the Kingdom of Italy, then Republic.

It is an important agricultural, handicraft, industrial center, and is home to numerous companies, both large and small, and a hub of a certain importance from the point of view of traffic and the national electricity distribution network.

== Geography ==
=== Territory ===
The municipality borders the provinces of Treviso and Padua. The municipal territory is almost flat, of alluvial nature like the rest of the Po Valley. It is also very rich in resurgences and waterways: in particular it is crossed by the river Dese and its tributaries (Rio Storto, Rio San Martino, Rio Sant'Ambrogio, Desolino). From the point of view of the orography, the area situated to the north of the river Dese is significantly higher than the territory south of the river.

As of 2010 Scorzè had an estimated population of 19,798. The streets SR515 and SR245 intersect in the town.

=== Climate ===
Scorzè has semi-temperate climate. Summers are humid and warm, the winters are quite cold, while the mid-seasons are more rainy.

== History ==
In the Middle Ages, the town was a centre for leather tanning, and the tanners (scorzeri) gave the town its name. It is first mentioned by Pope Eugene III in a Papal bull of 1152. In 1338 it was annexed by Venice, and in 1815 it became part of the Austro-Hungarian Empire.

== Monuments and places of interest ==
=== Arcipretal church and bell tower ===
The archpriest church, dedicated to San Benedetto Abate, was built between 1761 and 1767 on a project by the Venetian architect Giorgio Massari. Inside there are frescoes by Giovanni Battista Canal, Francesco Zugno and Antonio Beni.

=== Civil architecture ===
==== Castle ====
Built in the 12th century, the castle of Scorzè was set on fire and destroyed by Ezzelino III da Romano in March 1241 until a few years later the mayors of Treviso removed the embankments.

From the Austro-Hungarian maps of 1841 conserved in the Venice State Archives it is possible to deduce the exact position, the shape and the dimensions of the castle and the embankment on which it was built.

There is no certain information on how the castle was structured but it is certain that inside there was the residence of the Scorzadis and some warehouses.

The last traces of the perimeter of the structure were destroyed in 2000 following the construction of new industrial buildings.

=== Municipal building ===
Built between 1888 and 1889 on the initiative of the mayor Frattin on a project by architect Alvise Motta, with a cost of 45,000 lire (192,634 in 2019), it was inaugurated on March 14, 1889, on the occasion of the birthday of King Umberto I. Originally it had six classrooms, the offices of the Municipality, the post office and the telegraph office. The building is presented in neoclassical style.

It was renovated for the first time in the early sixties, while during the eighties the building was extended.

The last radical intervention on the building was made between 2007 and 2010, with a structural consolidation, the total renovation of the interiors and the addition of some rooms on the back. The inauguration after the restoration took place on April 24, 2010, while the first session of the City Council in the renovated venue was held on 26 May.

In 1985 the new municipal square dedicated to Aldo Moro was inaugurated, completed by the fountain and sculpture Olismo dedicated to the fallen and created by Simon Benetton. In 2016 the fountain is completely redone and dedicated to the industrialist Giuliano De Polo (1943–2004), historic president of Acqua Minerale San Benedetto from 1970 to his death.

== Society ==
=== Demographics ===
Historical population

Year	Pop.	±%
1861	-	—
1871	4,589	—
1881	4,988	+8.7%
1901	5,630	+12.9%
1911	6,959	+23.6%

Year	Pop.	±%
1921	7,917	+13.8%
1931	8,614	+8.8%
1936	8,905	+3.4%
1951	10,163	+14.1%
1961	10,001	−1.6%

Year	Pop.	±%
1971	11,354	+13.5%
1981	13,947	+22.8%
1991	15,657	+12.3%
2001	17,295	+10.5%
2011	18,904	+9.3%

=== Ethnic groups and foreign minorities ===
As of December 31, 2015, foreigners residing in the municipality were 1 468, or 7.78% of the population. The following are the most significant groups:

- Romania, 397
- Albania, 194
- Kosovo, 159
- Morocco, 121
- Moldova, 105
- China, 100
- Nigeria, 70
- Ukraine, 47
- Burkina Faso, 26
- Serbia, 22

=== Other statistics ===
Old Age Index: 100.2 (2007)

Average Income: 20.607 (2005)

Number of Families: 6.106 (2001)

Number of Houses: 6.540 (2001)

== Economy ==
The economy of Scorzè is mainly based on a local mineral water industry, Acqua Minerale San Benedetto, and cultivation of radicchio di Treviso .

== Sources ==
- (Google Maps)
