= Eveliina Parikka =

Finnish footballer

Personal information
- Full name: Anna Eveliina Parikka
- Date of birth: 12 August 1990 (age 36)
- Place of birth: Kouvola, Finland
- Position: Midfielder

Youth career
- Sudet

Senior career*
Years	Team	Apps	(Gls)
2010	TiPS	18	(7)
2011–2016	PK-35 Vantaa	85	(29)
2017–2019	Limhamn Bunkeflo	39	(3)
2019–2020	HJK	26	(1)
2021	Honka	19	(5)

International career
2011–2013	Finland	2	(0)
- * Club domestic league appearances and goals

Anna Eveliina Parikka (born 12 August 1990) is a Finnish former professional footballer.

She is currently serving as a press office of the Finland women's national team.
