= Claudia Stilz =

Swiss footballer

Personal information
- Date of birth: 28 March 1986 (age 40)
- Place of birth: Rorschach, Switzerland
- Position: Midfielder

Senior career*
Years	Team	Apps	(Gls)
	Staad	231	(92)
- * Club domestic league appearances and goals

Claudia Stilz is a retired Swiss footballer who played for the Swiss side Staad.

== Career ==
Sitlz made 231 appearances and scored 92 goals for Staad.
