= Liza van der Most =

Dutch footballer (born 1993)

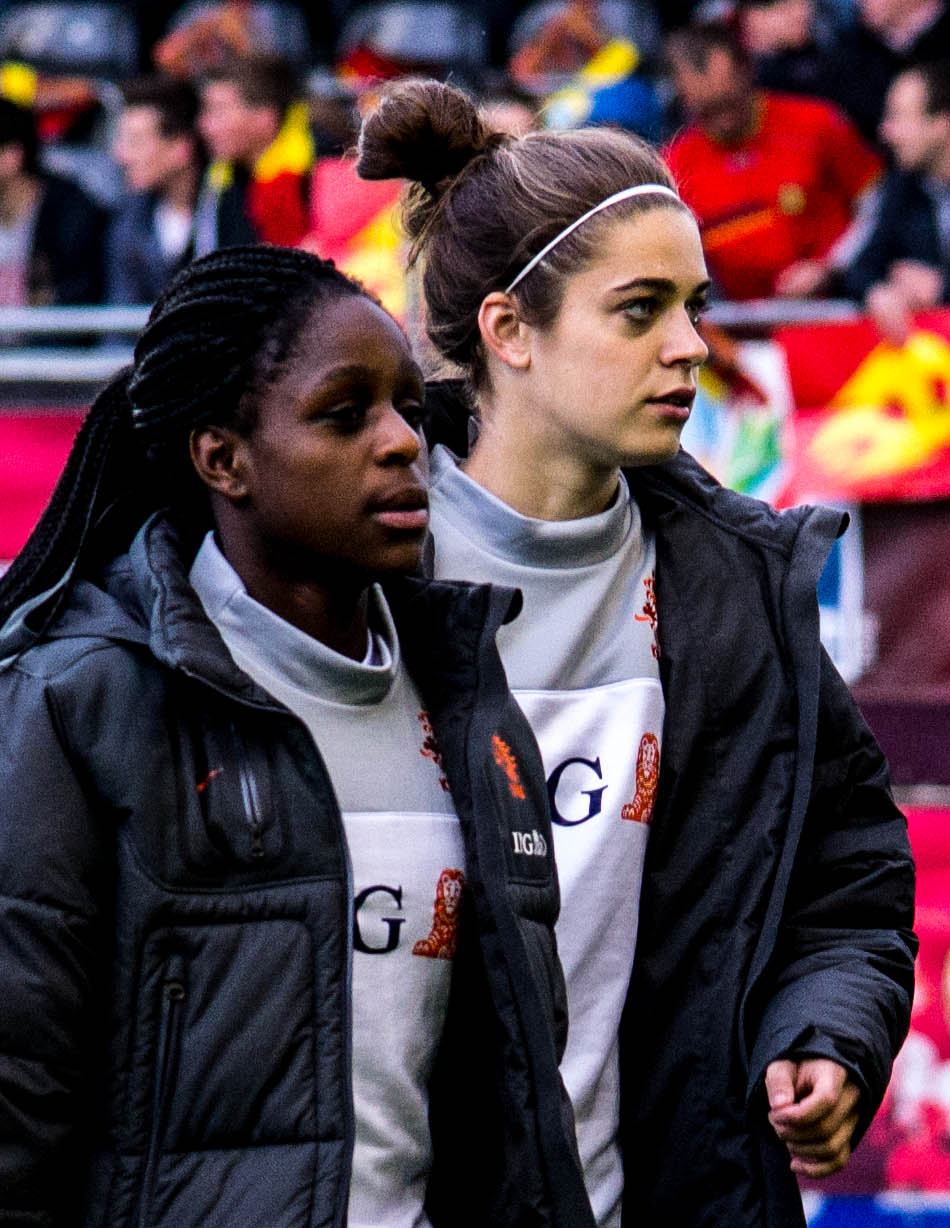
- Liza van der Most (left) with Tessel Middag in 2014

Personal information
- Full name: Liza Estefany van der Most
- Date of birth: 8 October 1993 (age 33)
- Place of birth: Bogotá, Colombia
- Height: 1.65 m (5 ft 5 in)
- Position: Defender

Youth career
- –2008: VV Papendrecht
- 2008–2012: SteDoCo

Senior career*
Years	Team	Apps	(Gls)
2011–2012	SteDoCo		
2012–2023	Ajax	171	(2)
2023–2025	Utrecht	14	(0)

International career
2009	Netherlands U17	1	(0)
2011–2012	Netherlands U19	11	(0)
2014–2019	Netherlands	15	(0)
Medal record
Women's football
Representing the Netherlands
FIFA Women's World Cup
Silver medal – second place	2019 France
UEFA Women's Championship
Gold medal – first place	2017 Netherlands
- * Club domestic league appearances and goals as of 16:52, 17 June 2024

Liza Estefany van der Most (born 8 October 1993) is a Dutch former professional footballer who played as defender.

== Club career ==
=== Ajax ===
As youth player, she played at VV Papendrecht before she joined the girl's academic of SteDoCo at the age of 11. In September 2008 she earned a spot in the KNVB Talent team. In July 2012 she was transferred to Ajax. She made her professional debut on 24 August 2012 in the match against SC Heerenveen. She scored her first league goal against Heerenveen on 3 February 2017, scoring in the 67th minute. In March 2019, van der Most overtook Desiree van Lunteren's 166 game record by making her 167th appearance. In February 2020, van der Most suffered an knee injury that kept her out for a year. On 9 July 2021, it was announced that van der Most and Eshly Bakker had extended their contracts, with van der Most signing a contract until 2023.

Van der Most left Ajax in May 2023, having played in Ajax's first official match and having made 216 appearances for the club.

=== Utrecht ===
On 23 May 2023, van der Most was announced at Utrecht. She made her league debut against Feyenoord on 10 September 2023.

== International career ==
She made her international debut on 20 August 2014 against Brazil.

She was part of the Dutch team which won the UEFA Women's Euro 2017. After the tournament, the whole team was honoured by the Prime Minister Mark Rutte and Minister of Sport Edith Schippers and made Knights of the Order of Orange-Nassau.

== Personal life ==
Van der Most was born in Colombia. She was adopted by a family in Papendrecht when she was seven months old.

== Honours ==
Ajax

- Eredivisie: 2016–17, 2022–23
- KNVB Women's Cup: 2013–14, 2016–17

Netherlands

- FIFA Women's World Cup runner-up: 2019
- UEFA European Women's Championship: 2017
- Algarve Cup: 2018

Individual

- Knight of the Order of Orange-Nassau: 2017
