= Sylvia Nooij =

Dutch footballer (1984–2017)

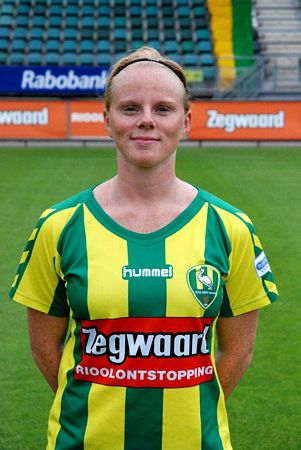
- Nooij with ADO Den Haag in 2010

Personal information
- Date of birth: 9 November 1984
- Place of birth: Amsterdam, Netherlands
- Date of death: 8 July 2017 (aged 32)
- Place of death: Zoutelande, Netherlands
- Height: 1.65 m (5 ft 5 in)
- Position: Defender

Senior career*
Years	Team	Apps	(Gls)
- SC Buitenveldert
- Ter Leede
- ADO Den Haag
- Dayton Dutch Lions
- ADO Den Haag
- SC Buitenveldert

International career
2003	Netherlands U19	11	(0)
2009–2012	Netherlands	6	(0)
- * Club domestic league appearances and goals

Sylvia Nooij (9 November 1984 – 8 July 2017) was a Dutch footballer who played as a defender. Her club career included SC Buitenveldert, Ter Leede and ADO Den Haag in her country and Dayton Dutch Lions in the United States. She capped for the Netherlands women's national team.
