= Olivia Maurel =

Swiss-French-American anti-surrogacy activist

- Olivia Maurel in 2024
- Born: 10 December 1991 (age 34); Louisville, Kentucky
- Occupation: Spokenperson of Casablanca Declaration association

Olivia Maurel is a Swiss-French-American author and activist known for her opposition to surrogacy. Born through surrogacy in the United States, she advocates for its international abolition and serves as spokesperson for the Casablanca Declaration, an international coalition of experts addressing the legal and ethical implications of the practice.

== Early life and background ==
Olivia Maurel was born in Louisville, on December 10, 1991, through a surrogacy arrangement organized by a specialized agency. According to her public statements, her intended parents turned to surrogacy due to infertility issues and age-related constraints. Her intended mother already had a child from a previous relationship, while her intended father wished to have a child with whom he would share a biological connection.

Through an agency, they were matched with a surrogate mother. According to Maurel, the surrogate had her own reasons for entering into the arrangement, including personal family difficulties, and was also supporting four children financially. Maurel has stated that the surrogate "probably needed money".

Olivia Maurel has described her birth as involving a form of abandonment, stating: “I was born and, before my mother even saw me, I was sold.” She has also said that from childhood she experienced a persistent sense of unease regarding her origins, describing a disconnect between the account she had been given about her birth and her own understanding of her history.

At the age of seventeen, she began conducting her own research into the circumstances surrounding her birth, including the role of surrogacy agencies in the region. She later discovered that several surrogacy agencies operated in Louisville, where she was born. According to her account, surrogacy was the only means by which her intended parents could have a child, and also the only way for the woman who intended to raise her to have a child at her age and in a city where the couple had no family connections.

Seeking further answers, Maurel stated that her mother-in-law suggested that she take a DNA test. According to Maurel, the results identified a genetic match with a cousin, whom she contacted. Through this connection, she was put in contact with her half-brother and later with her biological mother, who had also served as her surrogate. In 2022, she stated that this provided confirmation that she had been conceived using the sperm of her intended father through a surrogate arrangement in the United States.

In early adulthood, Maurel stated that she experienced periods of addiction and psychological difficulties, which she attributes to genetic factors related to her biological mother and to being separated from her at birth. She has publicly stated that surrogacy caused her significant harm.

== Education and personal life ==
Olivia Maurel graduated in banking and tax law from the University of Nice Sophia Antipolis and holds a master’s degree in economics and human resource management from Université Côte d’Azur.

She is married to Matthias Maurel and is the mother of three children. She has stated that becoming a mother profoundly influenced her understanding of pregnancy, childbirth, and the maternal bond, further strengthening her opposition to surrogacy.

She identifies as a feminist.

Maurel in 2020

== Public engagement and activism ==
In 2023, Olivia Maurel began publicly sharing her experience on TikTok. then on Instagram and X. Her activism primarily focuses on the universal abolition of surrogacy, which she considers a human rights issue affecting both women and children. She argues that “beautiful stories” do not make the practice more ethical. According to her, children should never become “objects of transaction.”

That same year, she became spokesperson for the Casablanca Declaration, an initiative launched on March 3, 2023, and supported by more than one hundred experts from the legal, medical, and academic fields. The Declaration calls for the development of an international legal instrument aimed at prohibiting surrogacy.

She has spoken at the United Nations in New York and Geneva, at the European Parliament, as well as before several national parliaments, including those of the Czech Republic, Slovakia, and Croatia.

Maurel argues that surrogacy raises ethical concerns related to the commodification of children, the potential exploitation of women, and the legal complexities of cross-border arrangements. She also describes the industry as an expanding transnational market shaped by economic disparities. She considers surrogate mothers to be “understandable victims of a system that promises them money.”

She has met several times with Reem Alsalem, United Nations Special Rapporteur on violence against women and girls, and has spoken alongside her at conferences.

On April 4, 2024, she was received in a private audience by Pope Francis.

== Publications and awards ==
On February 19, 2025, Maurel published her memoir "Où es-tu Maman ?" in French. In this autobiographical account, she retraces her personal history and reflects on the psychological and ethical implications of surrogacy. The book has been translated into several languages, including Spanish, German, Dutch, and Slovak. An English version will be released in July 2026 under the title "In Search of my Mother".

Following her extensive international human rights advocacy, Olivia Maurel received the Atreju Prize in Italy in 2024.

== Views ==
Olivia Maurel states that surrogacy is shaped by global economic inequalities and raises ethical questions concerning the separation of a child from the woman who carried them. She believes that regulatory approaches do not resolve the underlying issues associated with the practice.

She has also referred to market analysts’ projections (Global Market insights) estimating that the global surrogacy industry could reach approximately 200 billion dollars by the mid-2030s, viewing this growth as evidence of its development into a vast transnational market.
