= Viggianello, Basilicata =

Viggianello
- Comune
- Comune di Viggianello
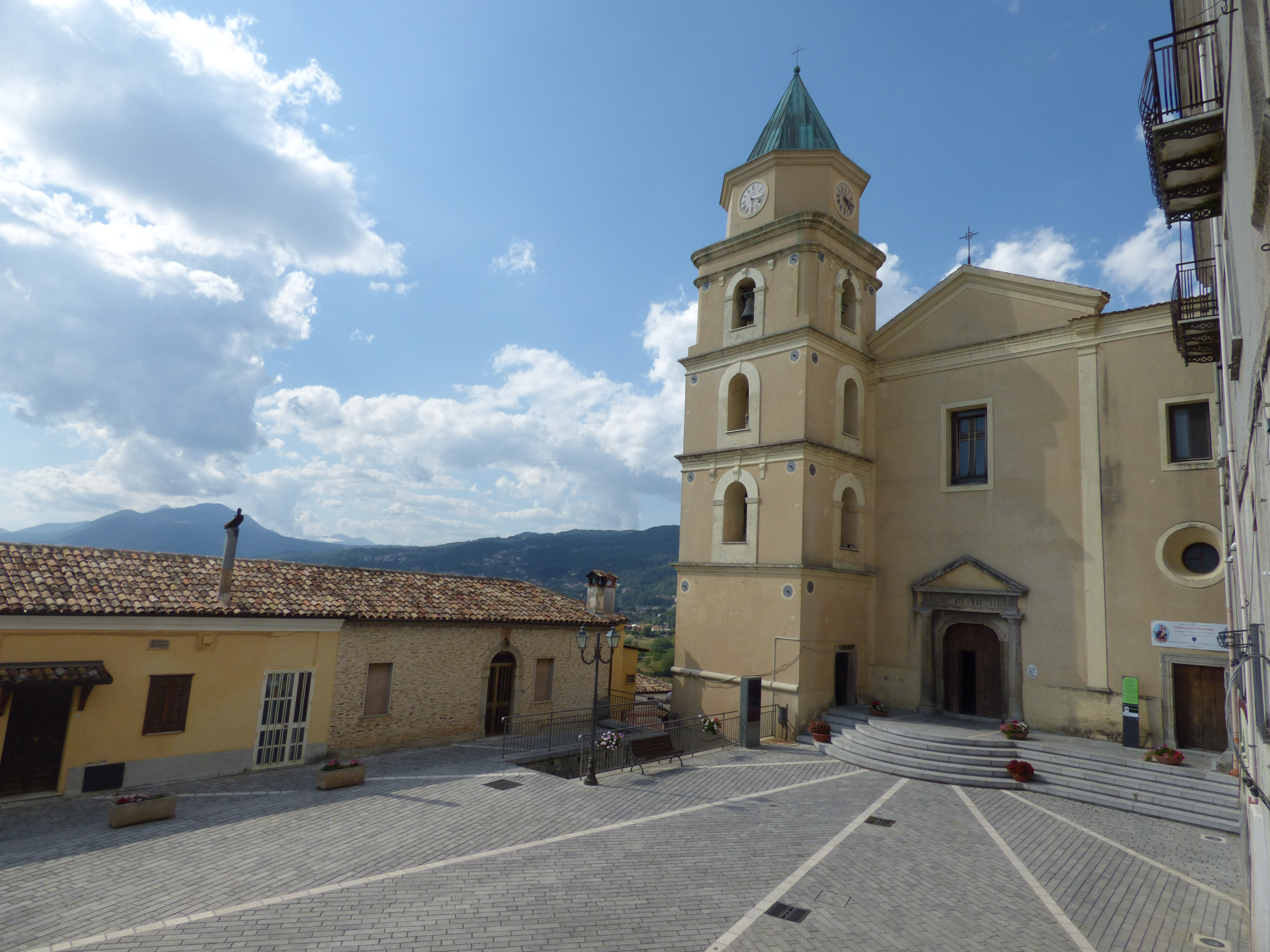
- Church of Saint Catherine Virgin and Martyr

- Location within Italy Location within Basilicata
- Coordinates: 39°58′N 16°5′E
- Country: Italy
- Region: Basilicata
- Province: Potenza (PZ)
- Frazioni: sono 36 tra cui Campo le Rose, Conocchielle, Pantana, Pedali, Prantalato, Prastio, Santa Rosalia, Torno, Varco, Vocolio, Voscari, Zarafa

Government
  - Mayor: Antonio Rizzo

Area
  - Total: 120.83 km^{2} (46.65 sq mi)
- Elevation: 500 m (1,600 ft)

Population (December 2008)
  - Total: 3,294
  - Density: 27.26/km^{2} (70.61/sq mi)
- Demonym: Viggianellesi
- Time zone: UTC+1 (CET)
  - Summer (DST): UTC+2 (CEST)
- Postal code: 85040
- Dialing code: 0973
- ISTAT code: 076097
- Patron saint: St. Francis of Paola, St Catherine of Alexandria
- Saint day: Last Sunday in August, 25 November
- Website: Official website

Viggianello (Lucano: Bingianieddu) is a town and comune in the province of Potenza, in the Southern Italian region of Basilicata. It is one of I Borghi più belli d'Italia ("The most beautiful villages of Italy").
