= Whitney Sharpe =

American soccer defender (born 1990)

Personal information
- Full name: Whitney Sharpe
- Date of birth: January 5, 1990 (age 36)
- Place of birth: West Des Moines, Iowa, United States
- Height: 1.70 m (5 ft 7 in)
- Position: Defender

College career
Years	Team	Apps	(Gls)
2008–2009	UCLA		
2010	Texas Tech		
2011–2012	Loyola Marymount		

Senior career*
Years	Team	Apps	(Gls)
2013–2014	Ajax	12	(1)

International career
2007	United States U17		
2009	United States U20		

Managerial career
- 2014–2017: Iowa State Cyclones (assistant)
- 2018: Drake Bulldogs (assistant)
- * Club domestic league appearances and goals

Whitney Lewis (née Sharpe; born January 5, 1990) is an American soccer defender, who last played for BeNe League club AFC Ajax, and was an assistant coach for the Iowa State Cyclones.

== Club career ==
=== Ajax ===
Before signing for Ajax in January 2013, Whitney Sharpe played Soccer at college level in the United States, playing for UCLA, Texas Tech and Loyola Marymount. She played a full season for Ajax helping the Women's team of Ajax to win their first trophy, by winning the KNVB Women's Cup.

== International career ==
She was a member of the United States women's youth national teams, having played on youth level from Under-15 to Under-20.

== Personal life ==
She married her husband Max Lewis in 2017.

== Honors ==
Ajax

- KNVB Women's Cup: 2014

Individual

- NSCAA Adidas All American Youth Team: 2006 & 2007
- Gatorade Player of the Year for Iowa: 2007 & 2008
- First Team Parade All American: 2008
- No.16 National Recruit by Soccer Buzz
