= Gloria Thato =

South African footballer

Personal information
- Date of birth: 11 January 1989 (age 37)
- Place of birth: Vaal, South Africa
- Position: Winger

Team information
- Current team: University of Pretoria

Senior career*
Years	Team	Apps	(Gls)
- Bophelong Ladies
- University of Pretoria

International career^{‡}
20??–	South Africa	35	(0)
- * Club domestic league appearances and goals ‡ National team caps and goals as of 11 October 2014

Gloria Thato (born 11 January 1989) is a South African football winger. She plays for University of Pretoria and the South Africa women's national football team.

== Playing career ==
=== International ===
In March 2013, Thato was called up to the national team to represent South Africa at the 2013 Cyprus Cup. During the team's first match of the tournament, Thato's two assists helped South Africa defeat Northern Ireland 2–1.

In September 2014, Thato was named to the roster for the 2014 African Women's Championship in Namibia.
