= Fabienne Bangerter =

Swiss association football player

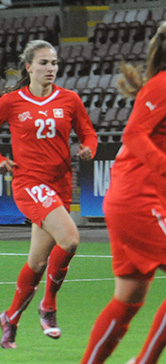

Personal information
- Date of birth: 11 September 1991 (age 35)
- Place of birth: Suhr, Aargau, Switzerland
- Height: 1.74 m (5 ft 9 in)
- Position: Defender

Senior career*
Years	Team	Apps	(Gls)
2007–2011	Aarau		
2011–2014	Basel	56	(19)
2014–2015	Freiburg	7	(0)
2015–2019	Basel	84	(14)
2021–2022	Aarau		

International career^{‡}
2013–2016	Switzerland	9	(0)
- * Club domestic league appearances and goals as of 29 July 2023 ‡ National team caps and goals as of 29 July 2023

Fabienne Bangerter (born 21 September 1991) is a retired Swiss footballer who played as a defender for Swiss club FC Basel.

== International career ==
Bangerter made her debut for Switzerland against the Netherlands.

== Honours ==
Basel

- Swiss Super League; runner-up: 2014/15, 2017/18
- Swiss Cup (1): 2013/14; runner-up: 2012/13, 2014/15
