= Zaina Bouzerrade =

Moroccan footballer

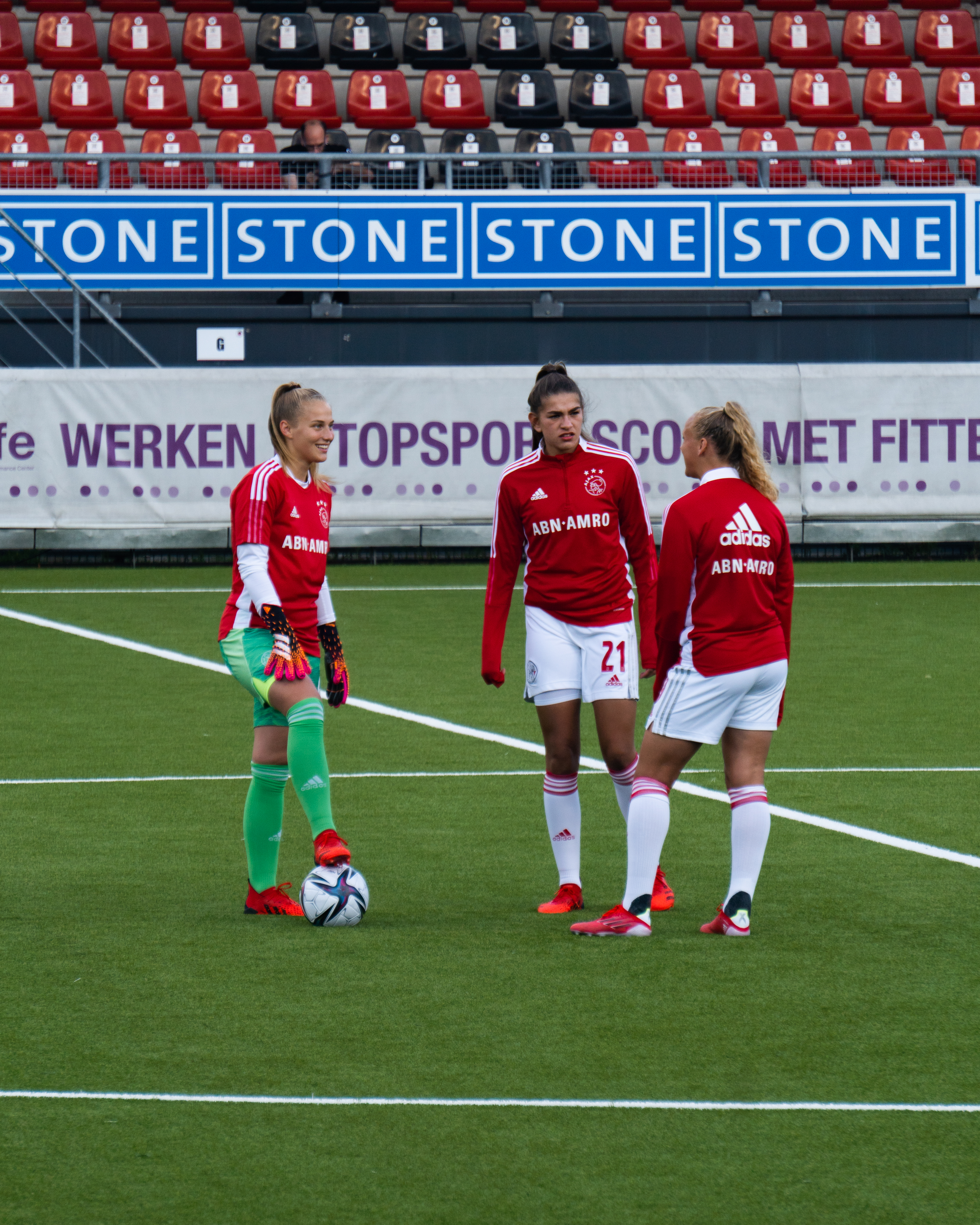
- Bouzerrade in the centre

Personal information
- Date of birth: 29 July 2002 (age 24)
- Place of birth: IJsselstein, Netherlands
- Height: 1.75 m (5 ft 9 in)
- Position: Right-back

Youth career
- 201?–2019: VVIJ IJsselstein
- 2019–2020: Ajax

Senior career*
Years	Team	Apps	(Gls)
2020–2022	Ajax	4	(0)
2022–2023	PEC Zwolle	9	(0)

International career^{‡}
2018	Netherlands U16	2	(0)
2018–2019	Netherlands U17	6	(1)
2019–2020	Netherlands U19	1	(0)
2020	Netherlands U20	3	(0)
2021–	Morocco	1	(0)
- * Club domestic league appearances and goals as of 22 November 2010. ‡ National team caps and goals as of 10 June 2021.

Zaina Bouzerrade (Arabic: زينة بوزراد; born 29 July 2002) is a footballer who plays as a right-back. Born in the Netherlands, she represents Morocco at international level.

== Club career ==
=== Ajax ===
Bouzerrade is a VVIJ IJsselstein product. She has played for Ajax in the Netherlands. Bouzerrade made her league debut against AZ Alkmaar on 8 October 2021.

=== PEC Zwolle ===
Bouzerrade was announced at PEC Zwolle on June 21, 2022. She made her league debut against Twente on 23 September 2022.

== International career ==
Bouzerrade made her senior debut for Morocco on 10 June 2021 in a 3–0 friendly home win over Mali.

== See also ==
- List of Morocco women's international footballers
