= Daria Marszałkowska =

Polish association football player and boxer

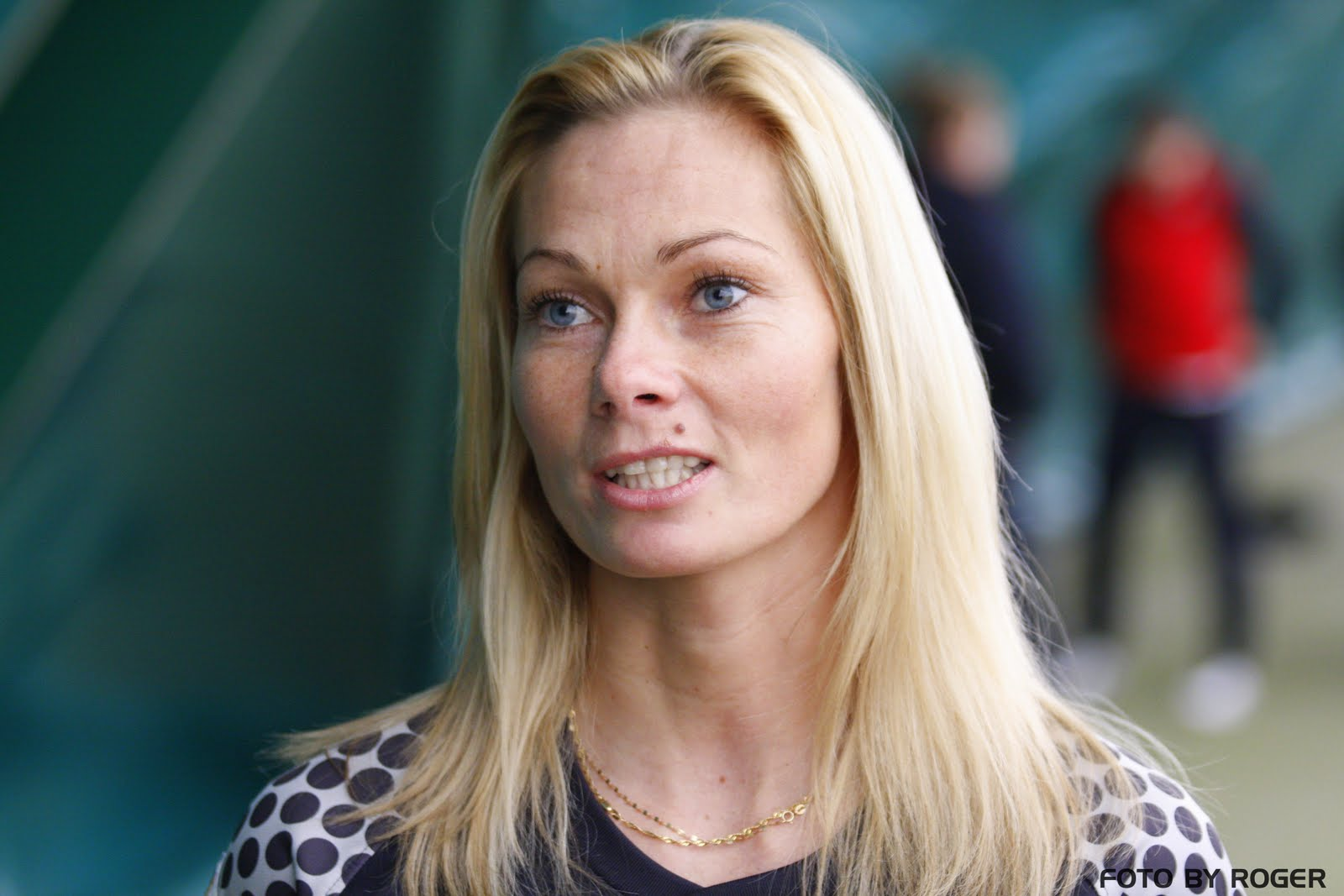
- Marszałkowska in 2013

Personal information
- Birth name: Daria Antończyk
- Date of birth: 7 December 1983 (age 42)
- Place of birth: Jastrzębie-Zdrój, Poland
- Height: 1.70 m (5 ft 7 in)
- Position: Goalkeeper

Senior career*
Years	Team	Apps	(Gls)
2003–2013	Unia Racibórz		
2013–2014	Ajax	4	(0)
2014–2017	AZS PWSZ Wałbrzych		
2023	GKS Katowice	0	(0)

International career
	Poland	33	(0)
- * Club domestic league appearances and goals

Daria Marszałkowska (née Antończyk, born 7 December 1983) is a Polish former professional footballer who played as a goalkeeper. She was previously an amateur boxer and won a bronze medal at the 2002 Polish Boxing Championship.

== Biography ==
Marszałkowska comes from Jastrzębie-Zdrój, Poland, and grew up in a family that engaged in several sports. Before taking up football she was a cross-country runner, played volleyball competitively, and took up boxing.

== Club career ==
Marszałkowska took up football after agreeing to accompany a college friend to a trial with their local club RTP Unia Racibórz. With Unia Racibórz, she started playing as a forward but soon switched to goalkeeper. She signed a one-year contract with Dutch BeNe League club Ajax Amsterdam in September 2013.

== International career ==
Marszałkowska made her debut for Poland in a 2–0 2011 FIFA Women's World Cup qualifying win over Romania at Dyskobolia Stadium in October 2009.

== Honours ==
Unia Racibórz

- Ekstraliga: 2008–09, 2009–10, 2010–11, 2011–12, 2012–13
- Polish Cup: 2009–10, 2010–11, 2011–12
