= Valérie Gillioz =

Swiss association football player

Personal information
- Date of birth: 18 July 1987 (age 39)
- Position: Midfielder

International career
Years	Team	Apps	(Gls)
- Switzerland

Valérie Gillioz is a Swiss former footballer who played as a midfielder for Swiss club Servette FC and the Switzerland national team.
