= Pietro Ghedin =

Italian footballer and coach

Personal information
- Date of birth: 21 November 1952 (age 73)
- Place of birth: Scorzè, Italy
- Height: 1.80 m (5 ft 11 in)
- Position: Defender

Senior career*
Years	Team	Apps	(Gls)
1969–1970	Venezia		
1970–1972	Fiorentina		
1972–1974	Catania		
1974–1981	Lazio		
1979–1980	→ Pescara (loan)		
1981–1983	Pistoiese		

Managerial career
- Italy U18
- 1992–1995: Malta
- 1992–1995: Malta U21
- 1998–2004: Italy (assistant)
- 2005–2012: Italy Women
- 2012–2017: Malta
- * Club domestic league appearances and goals

Pietro Ghedin (born 21 November 1952) is an Italian football coach and former player who last managed the Maltese national team.

== Playing career ==
Born in Scorzè, Ghedin played as a defender for Venezia, Fiorentina, Catania, Lazio, Pescara and Pistoiese.

== Coaching career ==
Ghedin began his coaching career with the Italian Football Federation in 1987, which included managing the under-18 team. He served as both goalkeeper coach and assistant manager to the Italian senior side, and managed the Italy women's team between 2005 and 2012.

Ghedin was manager of the Malta national team between 1992 and 1995, also managing the under-21 team at the same time, and was reappointed in May 2012. He left the job on 11 October 2017, as Tom Saintfiet was appointed as the new head coach.

== Managerial statistics ==
As of 12 October 2017

Team	From	To	Record				
Team	From	To	G	W	D	L	Win %
Malta	9 May 2012	11 October 2017	48	8	5	35	16.67
Total			48	8	5	35	16.67
