= Laura Du Ry =

Dutch association football player

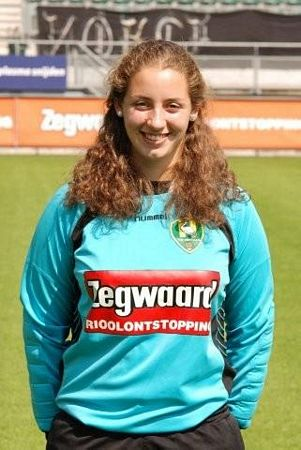

Personal information
- Birth name: Laura Anne Du Ry van Beest Holle
- Date of birth: 13 August 1992 (age 34)
- Place of birth: Amsterdam, Netherlands
- Position: Goalkeeper

Senior career*
Years	Team	Apps	(Gls)
2009–2011	ADO Den Haag	8	(0)
2011	Standard Liège	9	(0)
2011–2012	PEC Zwolle	7	(0)
2012–2016	Ajax	41	(0)
2016–2017	Lyon		
2017	FGCDL		

International career
2007	Netherlands U15	1	(0)
2008	Netherlands U17	2	(0)
2010–2011	Netherlands U19	15	(0)
- * Club domestic league appearances and goals as of 16:17, 10 June 2024

Laura Anne Du Ry van Beest Holle (born 13 August 1992) is a Dutch former goalkeeper who has played for Ajax in the Eredivisie.

== Career ==
=== ADO Den Haag ===
Du Ry made her league debut against Utrecht on 24 January 2011.

=== Standard Liège ===
On 15 December 2011, it was announced that Du Ry left Standard Liège.

=== PEC Zwolle ===
On 28 December 2011, Du Ry was announced at FC Zwolle. She made her league debut against Utrecht on 21 February 2012.

=== Ajax ===
Du Ry made her league debut against Heerenveen on 24 August 2012. In June 2013, she suffered a shoulder injury that kept her out for months.

=== Lyon ===
Du Ry suffered a torn ankle ligaments injury that kept her out for six weeks.

=== FGCDL ===
On June 1, 2017, Du Ry was announced at FGCDL.

== International career ==
On 30 March 2013, it was announced that Du Ry had replaced Angela Christ due to Christ's injury.

== Post-playing career ==
In January 2021, Du Ry joined Jogo as its head of marketing. As of June 2024, Du Ry is working for Appwrite.

== Personal life ==
Du Ry studied Internationale Business and Management at the Amsterdam University of applied sciences, and a Sportmarketing/Commerciele Economie bachelor's degree at Johan Cruyff Institute.
