= Pernilla Nordlund =

Finnish footballer (born 1990)

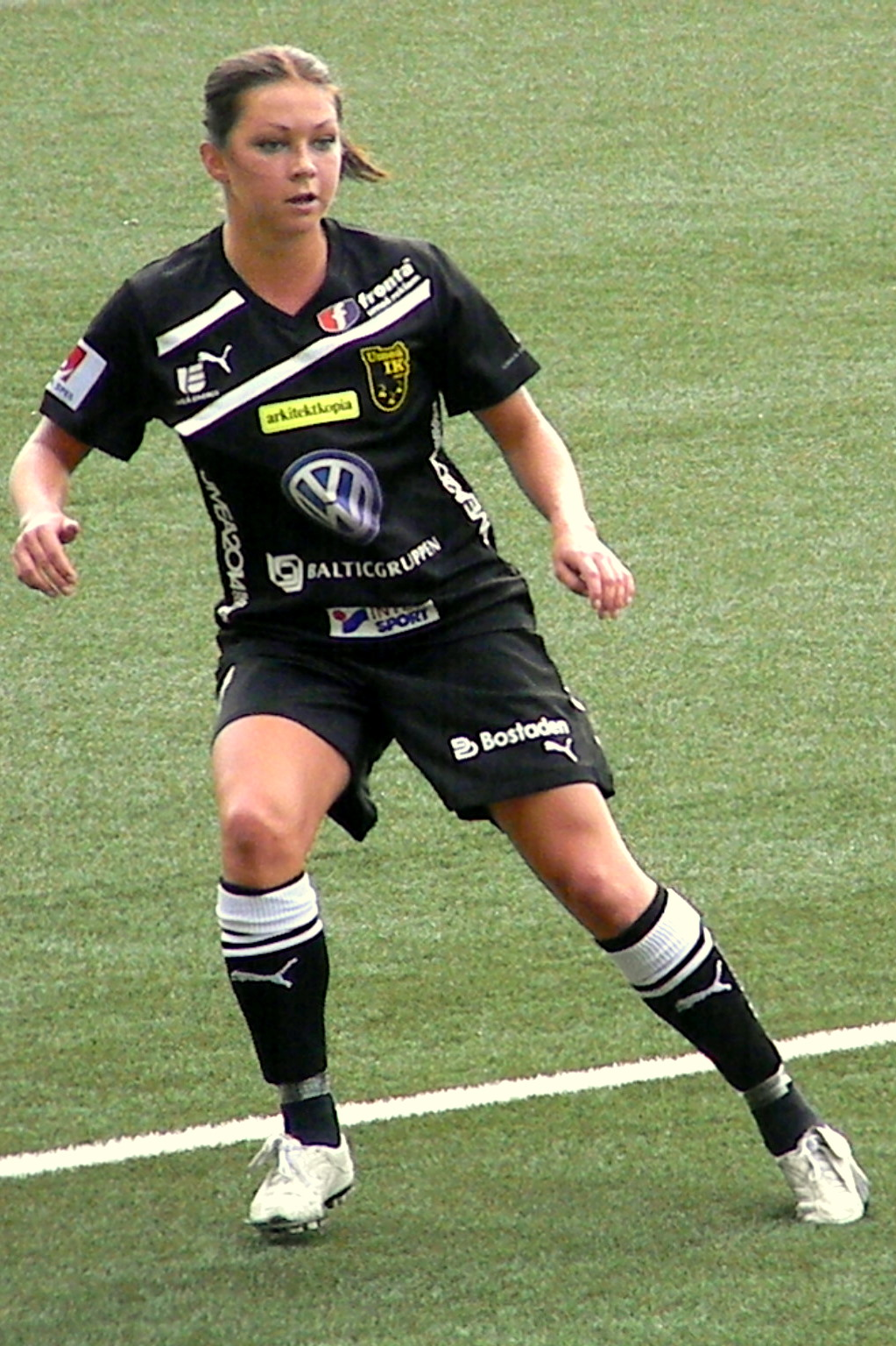

Personal information
- Full name: Pernilla Sofie Nordlund
- Date of birth: 10 October 1990 (age 36)
- Place of birth: Finland
- Height: 1.62 m (5 ft 4 in)
- Position: Midfielder

Senior career*
Years	Team	Apps	(Gls)
- Sport 39
2010–2012	Umeå	38	(1)

International career
2011–2013	Finland	22	(0)
- * Club domestic league appearances and goals

Pernilla Sofie Nordlund (born 10 October 1990) is a Finnish former football midfielder, who last played for Umeå IK in the Swedish Damallsvenskan.

She was a member of the Finnish national team since 2011, winning 22 caps.

Nordlund quit football for health reasons in April 2013, aged 22. It was just three months before UEFA Women's Euro 2013.
