= Mandy Versteegt =

Dutch footballer (born 1990)

Personal information
- Full name: Mandy Versteegt
- Date of birth: 23 February 1990 (age 36)
- Place of birth: Woerden, Netherlands
- Position: Forward

Youth career
- Sportlust '46

Senior career*
Years	Team	Apps	(Gls)
2007–2012	FC Utrecht	74	(12)
2012–2016	AFC Ajax	75	(21)

International career
2006–2007	Netherlands U17	10	(1)
2007–2009	Netherlands U19	18	(3)
2012–2014	Netherlands	6	(0)
- * Club domestic league appearances and goals as of 00:07, 28 August 2016 (UTC)

Mandy Versteegt (born 23 February 1990) is a former Dutch footballer. She played as a striker for BeNe League club AFC Ajax and the Netherlands national team.

== Club career ==
She played for FC Utrecht in the Eredivisie before moving to AFC Ajax in 2012 to play in the first season of the BeNe League. She retired from football aged 26 after losing interest in football.

== International career ==
Versteegt made her first appearance for the senior Netherlands women's national football team on 15 February 2012, a 2–1 friendly defeat to France in Nîmes.

She was called up to be part of the national team for the UEFA Women's Euro 2013.

== Career statistics ==
=== International ===
Appearances and goals by national team and year
National team	Year	Apps	Goals
Netherlands	2012	2	0
Netherlands	2013	1	0
Netherlands	2014	3	0
Total		6	0

== Honours ==
=== Club ===
FC Utrecht

Winner

- KNVB Women's Cup: 2009–2010
