= Laura Neboli =

Italian football defender

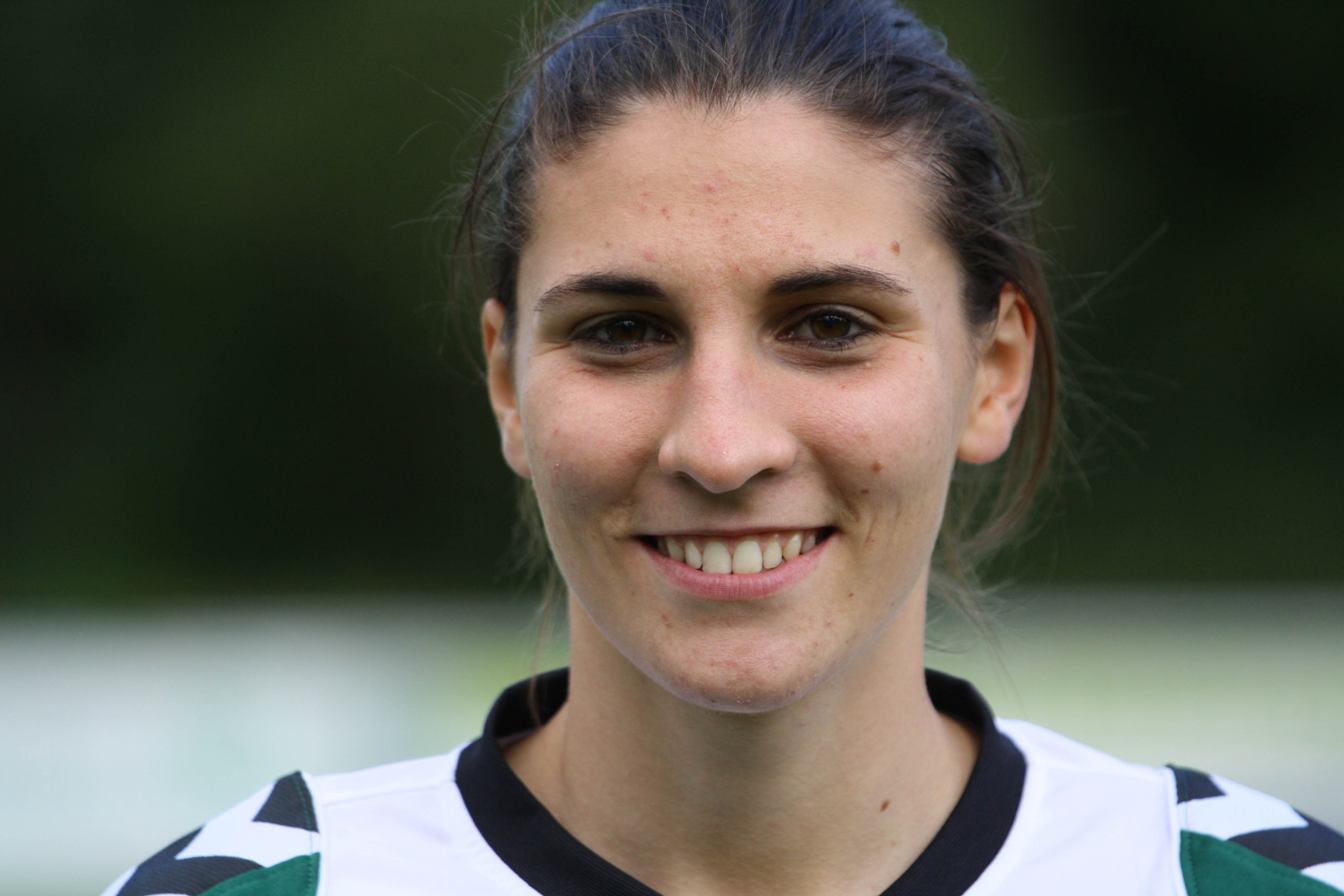

Personal information
- Date of birth: 14 March 1988 (age 38)
- Place of birth: Gavardo, Italy
- Height: 1.68 m (5 ft 6 in)
- Position: Defender

Senior career*
Years	Team	Apps	(Gls)
2003–2005	Bardolino		
2005–2010	Reggiana		(5)
2010–2011	Tavagnacco	17	(0)
2011–2013	FCR Duisburg	41	(1)
2014	MSV Duisburg		

International career^{‡}
2008–	Italy	26	(0)
- * Club domestic league appearances and goals as of 30 November 2016 ‡ National team caps and goals as of 12:00, 1 July 2013 (UTC)

Laura Neboli (born 14 March 1988) is an Italian football defender who last played for MSV Duisburg of the German Bundesliga. She previously played in Serie A for CF Bardolino, ASD Reggiana and UPC Tavagnacco.

As a member of the Italy women's national football team, she took part in the 2009 and 2013 UEFA Women's Championships.

== International career ==
Neboli made her senior debut for the Italy women's national football team in March 2008, in a 4–2 Algarve Cup defeat by Norway.

At UEFA Women's Euro 2009 in Finland, Neboli was an unused substitute in all four games as the Italians reached the quarter-finals. National coach Antonio Cabrini named Neboli in his selection for UEFA Women's Euro 2013 in Sweden.

== Titles ==
- 1 Italian League (2005)

1 Italian Cup with Reggiana ( 2010 )
