= Leonne Stentler =

Dutch former footballer (born 1986)

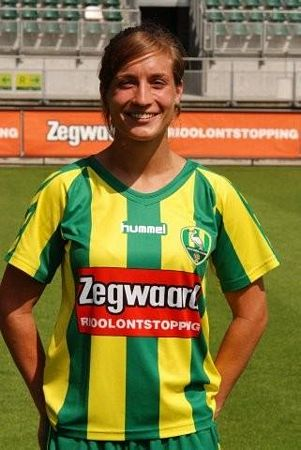
- Stentler in 2009

Personal information
- Full name: Leonne Suzanne Stentler
- Date of birth: 23 April 1986 (age 40)
- Place of birth: Rotterdam, Netherlands
- Height: 1.78 m (5 ft 10 in)
- Position: Defender

Youth career
- sv Bolnes
- RVVH

Senior career*
Years	Team	Apps	(Gls)
2007–2012	ADO Den Haag	64	(4)
2012–2015	AFC Ajax	28	(1)

International career
2009–2013	Netherlands	16	(0)
- * Club domestic league appearances and goals

Leonne Suzanne Stentler (born 23 April 1986) is a Dutch former footballer. She played as a defender. She currently works as a football pundit for NOS, the Dutch public broadcaster, and regularly appears as a studio analyst during major international tournaments, including the UEFA European Championship and the FIFA World Cup.

== Club career ==
Stentler played for ADO Den Haag in the Eredivisie before moving to AFC Ajax in 2012, to play in the first season of the BeNe League.

== International career ==
In March 2009 Rotterdam-born Stentler made her senior international debut, against South Africa at the Cyprus Cup.

Stentler was called up to be part of the national team for the UEFA Women's Euro 2013.

In total, Stentler earned 16 caps between 2009 and 2013.

== Honours ==
=== Club ===
ADO Den Haag

Winner

- Eredivisie: 2011–12
- KNVB Women's Cup: 2011–12
