= Petra Hogewoning =

Dutch footballer (born 1986)

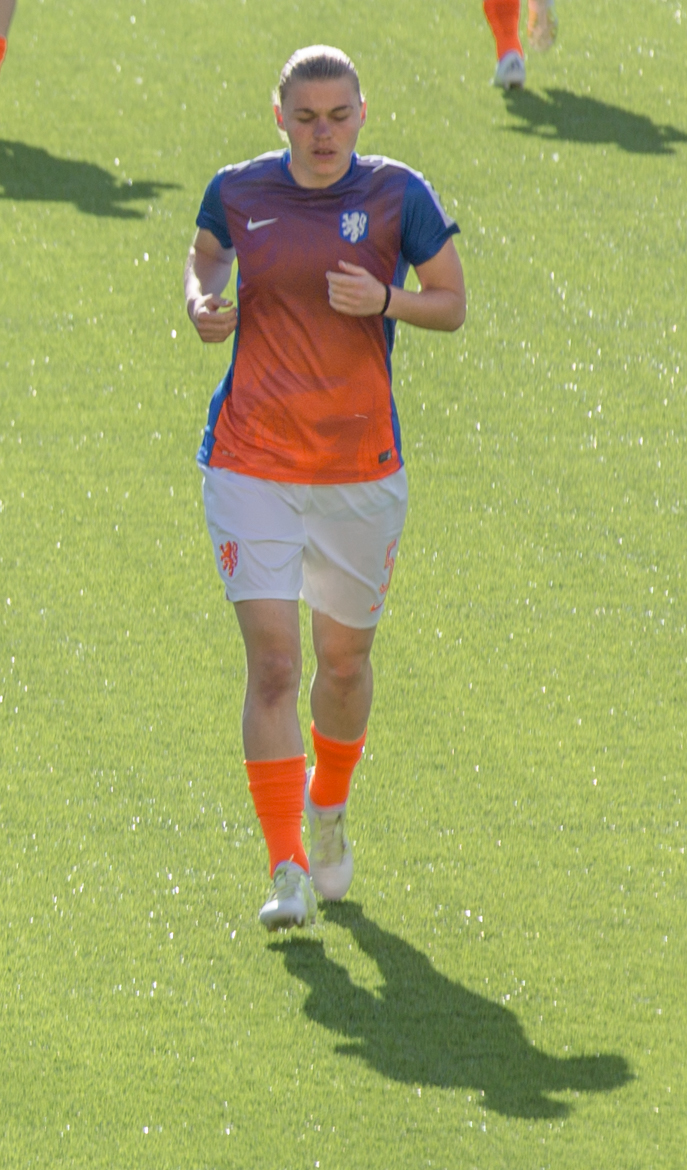
- Hogewoning at the 2015 FIFA Women's World Cup

Personal information
- Full name: Petra Marieka Jacoba Hogewoning
- Date of birth: 26 March 1986 (age 40)
- Place of birth: Rijnsburg, Netherlands
- Height: 1.70 m (5 ft 7 in)
- Position: Left back

Youth career
- Quick Boys

Senior career*
Years	Team	Apps	(Gls)
2003–2007	Ter Leede		
2007–2010	FC Utrecht		
2010–2011	Zvezda 2005 Perm		
2011	Sky Blue FC	1	(0)
2011–2012	FCR Duisburg	10	(0)
2012–2016	Ajax	64	(0)

International career^{‡}
2004–2015	Netherlands	100	(0)
- * Club domestic league appearances and goals as of 02:07, 28 August 2016 (UTC) ‡ National team caps and goals as of 02:07, 28 August 2016 (UTC)

Petra Marieka Jacoba Hogewoning (Dutch pronunciation: [ˈpeːtraː maːˈrikaː jaːˈkoːbaː ˈɦoːɣəˌʋoːnɪŋ]; born 26 March 1986) is a Dutch retired football defender. She played for clubs in the Netherlands, Russia, the United States and Germany, as well as for the Netherlands women's national football team.

== Club career ==
In 2006–07 Hogewoning helped VV Ter Leede win the double in the last season of the pre-Eredivisie Vrouwen era. She moved to FC Utrecht for the start of the new competition, but missed most of 2007–08 with torn cruciate ligaments.

She signed for German Bundesliga side FCR Duisburg in 2011. In 2012, she joined the newly formed AFC Ajax women's team, where she remained for almost four years. She retired from football in May 2016 after Ajax's KNVB Women's Cup final defeat by ADO Den Haag.

== International career ==
On 6 August 2004 Hogewoning debuted for the senior Netherlands women's national football team, playing the first half of a 2–0 defeat to Japan in Zeist.

Hogewoning played in every match as the Netherlands reached the semi-final of UEFA Women's Euro 2009.

In October 2012 she suffered another anterior cruciate ligament injury, which cost her a place in the Dutch squad for UEFA Women's Euro 2013.

Hogewoning was appointed as a knight for playing 100 games for the national team.
