= Netherlands at the UEFA Women's Championship =

The Netherlands have participated five times at the UEFA Women's Championship: in 2009, in 2013, in 2017, in 2022 and in 2025. The Dutch won the tournament as hosts in 2017.

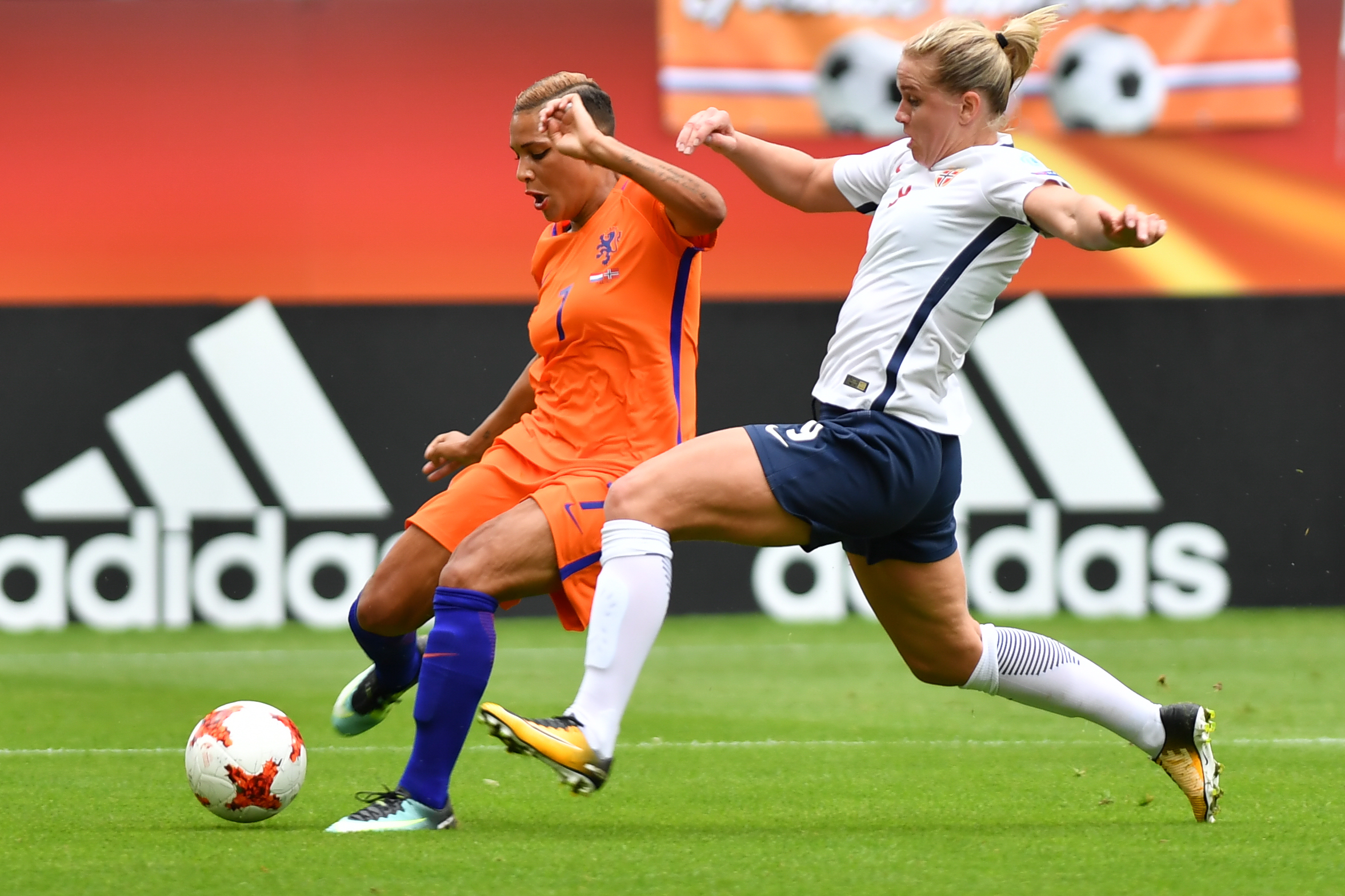
Shanice van de Sanden (NED) in a duel with Elise Thorsnes (NOR) in group play on July 16, 2017

== 1984 ==
For the first European Championship 16 teams entered qualifying and the allocation of the qualification groups took place geographically. The team coached by Bert van Lingen had to compete against Belgium, West Germany and Denmark. On 25 September 1982, they played against their neighbors Belgium their first qualifier, in which Sjaan Fortuin scored the first official goal for the Dutch women in the first minute. The lead could not be defended and so the Belgians won 3–2. After that they won 2–1 against the Danes in Groningen and managed two draws against West Germany, but the last match in Denmark was lost 2-0 and so they missed the qualification for the final round. Instead, Denmark went through to play the semi-finals in two games against England, but lost both. Top scorers for the Netherlands were Wil de Visser and Loes Camper, each with three goals.

== 1987 ==
Qualifying games for the next European Championship began in March 1985 already. Again 16 teams entered the draw. A geographical division of the qualification groups was omitted this time. Nevertheless, the Dutch again met their neighbors Belgium, as well as defending champions Sweden and France. The Dutch were able to win all home games and in France, but lost in Belgium and Sweden. It was only enough for second place. Top scorer for the Netherlands was Jeannie Allott, who scored the first three goals in the 5–3 against France. Group winner Sweden then went on to lose in the final to host Norway.

== 1989 ==
Three months after the last final, qualifying for the next finals began. The Dutch were now coached by Piet Buter and again Sweden was one of the opponents, as well as Ireland and Scotland. After two games the Scots withdrew their team, so the 4–0 win of the Dutch women against the Scottish women was scrapped. The Dutch women started the qualification with a goalless draw in Sweden, after which they won all their matches without conceding and qualified for the first time for the quarter-finals. Here they met defending champion Norway, who had finished second in their qualifying group and lost both games. With five goals Marjoke de Bakker was the top Dutch goal scorer. On the other hand, the group second Sweden prevailed against Denmark, who had beaten the Norwegians into second place. Norway lost the final to West Germany.

== Euro 1991 ==
In qualifying for the following European Championship finals, the Dutch women were coached by Bert van Lingen. Again they met Ireland and for the first time Northern Ireland. The Netherlands again didn't concede any goals, winning three games and drawing 0–0 in Ireland. They scored a total of 17 goals, only one less than Denmark and defending champion Germany, but played two more games. Denmark were the opponents in the quarter-finals and since both teams could not score in their home game in regular time, there was an extension in the second game in Denekamp, in which the Danes scored the crucial goal. Again, Marjoke de Bakker was the top Dutch goal scorer, with six goals this time. Denmark were allowed to host the finals and failed in the semi-final against Norway in the penalty shootout, but managed a win in the match for third place against Italy.

== Euro 1993 ==
23 teams took part in the qualification for the following European Championship. In order to qualify for the quarter-finals, the Netherlands had to play in the group stage against Greece and Romania. Teams they had not previously played. The Dutch women began the qualification under Bert van Lingen. After the first game - a 3–0 win over Greece - Jan Derks took over the responsibilities. Under him, they also won the second game against Greece and played to two draws against Romania. Since Romania only drew 0–0 in Greece, the Dutch women were again group winners and qualified for the quarter-finals. Here they met Norway and lost both games 0–3. Norway then went on to win the title for the second time. Top scorer this time was Nathalie Geeris with three goals.

== Euro 1995 ==
A month later 29 teams began the qualification for the next European Championship, which was played for the last time without a final round. For the first time ever, the Dutch team met Iceland against whom both games were lost. They also faced Greece against whom both matches were won. In second place the Dutch were eliminated again. Iceland could not prevail in the quarterfinals against England. Top Dutch scorer was Rianne van Dam with two goals.

== Euro 1997 ==
A year later the qualification for the next European Championship finals began for the 34 teams who had signed up. Due to the different skill level of the teams the qualification was divided into two categories. The 16 strongest teams, including the Netherlands now coached by Ruud Dokter, played for the direct qualification against the 18 weaker teams for a place in the next round. Opponents were Iceland and France again, as well as Russia. The Dutch women only won the match with eventual winners Russia and played to two draws (in France and against Russia), but lost three games. With that they finished in last place and had to play relegation matches against the Czech Republic, both of which were won. The top Dutch goal scorer with two goals was Danielle Korbmacher. Russia qualified as group winners directly for the finals, France succeeded in the playoffs against Finland, while Iceland failed in the playoffs to defending champions Germany. In the finals France and Russia didn't move past the group stage, which took place for the first time.

== Euro 2001 ==
The Dutch again played in the higher category in qualification for the 2001 European Championship. They again faced France and Sweden and, for the first time, Spain. No game could be won, points were only achieved in three drawn games, the other three were lost and the Dutch again occupied the last place. In the relegation matches they had two wins against Hungary securing A-category. Three players with two goals each were the best Dutch goal scorers. Group winner was France, which qualified directly for the finals, but failed there in the group stage. Sweden as a runner-up in the group faced Finland in playoff's and prevailed through to the finals, where they lost to host and defending champion Germany. Spain failed in the play-offs against Denmark.

== Euro 2005 ==
England as host for the European Championship in 2005 was a decision made in advance. In category A this time, 20 teams played in four groups of five and the Netherlands met old acquaintances: Denmark, Norway, Spain and Belgium. The Dutch women, now coached by Frans de Kat, could only win both games against their neighbors - each 3-0 - and reach a goalless draw in Spain. All other games were lost and the Dutch ended in fourth place. No player managed more than one goal. Even before the last game Remy Reynierse had temporarily taken over the duties of national team coach. In October 2004, he was replaced by Vera Pauw, who had previously coached the Scotland women's national football team. Pauw later initiated big changes in Dutch women's football by pushing hard for the women's division in 2007. Group winner Denmark - three points ahead of Norway - directly qualified for the finals while Norway succeeded in the playoffs against Iceland. At the championship Norway made it into the final but lost against Germany, while Denmark failed at the group stage.

== Euro 2009 ==
For UEFA Women's Euro 2009, the Netherlands put in a bid to host, but the tournament was awarded to Finland. For the first time twelve teams would be invited to play in the tournament. The qualification mode also changed. The first qualifying round was played between the 20 weakest national teams. The Netherlands were placed in the second round in a group of five. They met champion Germany against whom the qualifying campaign started with a 1–5 loss. Other opponents were Switzerland, Belgium and Wales, against whom both matches were won. With a 3–0 victory against Belgium, the Dutch women secured second place. Germany won the group with the last game in Switzerland. As one of the two worst runners-up, the Dutch women had to play in the play-offs against the other worst runner-up, the Spaniards and won both games 2–0. Thus they were qualified for the first time for the championship. Top Dutch scorers were Manon Melis with seven goals in the group matches and Karin Stevens with four goals, three of them in the playoffs. By contrast, the third-placed Swiss women did not qualify for the playoffs because they were the second-worst third.

At the finals, the Dutch won the opening match against Ukraine, who also made their debut, 2–0. Kirsten van de Ven was responsible for the first goal scored by the Dutch at any Finals. They then lost to hosts Finland 2–1, but a 2–1 win over Denmark helped them to second place and qualification for the knockout stage. Here they met France, but since both teams did not score in 120 minutes it came to a penalty shoot-out. While only two of seven Dutch shooters failed to score, three French women fired at the post or over the goal. In this way the Euro Championship newcomer surprisingly made it to the semifinals to face England. After a goalless first half, both scored between the 61st and 64th minute. It remained even until the end and the match went into extra-time. The English women scored the decisive goal four minutes before the end to win a place in the final. In the final against Germany, England lost decisively 2–6. Vera Pauw initially remained in office, but was fired as bondcoach in March 2010 after differences with the association leadership. Her successor was first Ed Engelkes and then in November 2010 Roger Reijners.

== Euro 2013 ==
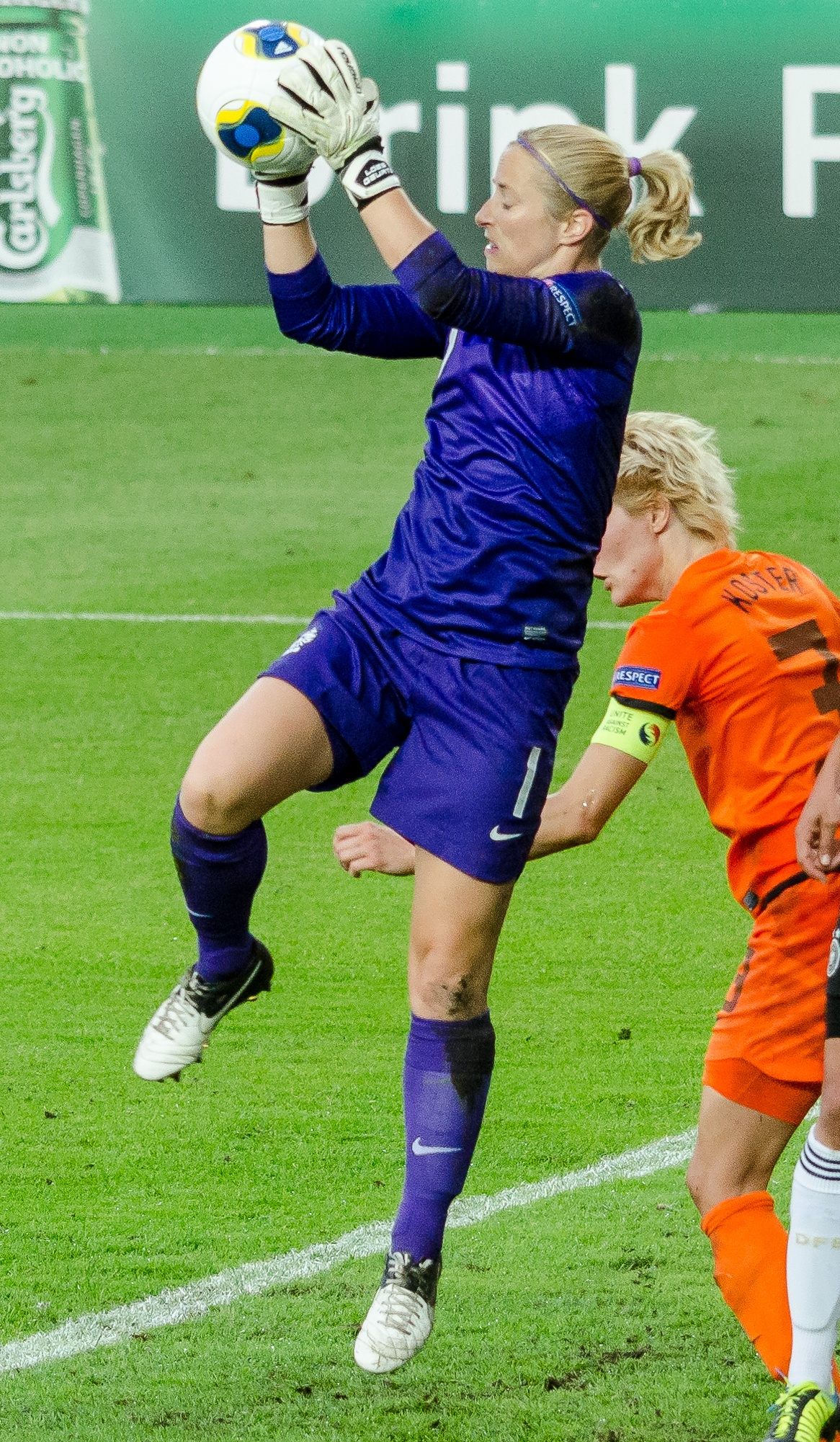
Scene from the match against Germany with Loes Geurts and Daphne Koster

The Netherlands again applied to host the Euro 2013, but this time lost to Sweden. Again, the qualifiers were started by the weaker teams but this time only by the eight weakest teams. The Netherlands entered again in the second round and faced England as well as for the first time, Croatia, Serbia and Slovenia, The Dutch could not win against England (0-0 and 0–1) and took second place behind England, but qualified as the best runner-up. Top scorer for the Dutch was again Manon Melis, this time with eight goals, four of which she scored in the 6–0 against Serbia in the first game.

At the finals the Dutch were seen as a dark horse, the team started with a goalless draw against defending champion Germany, but was at times the better team. But Norway and Iceland then both narrowly beat them 0–1. So the team was eliminated as group last and the only team who didn't score a goal. The two group opponents Germany and Norway met in the final with the usual result again. However, in the subsequent Qualification for the World Cup 2015, the upward trend that had started at the European Championships continued and the Dutch were able to secure a place at the World Cup for the first time. Precocious 18-year-old striker Vivianne Miedema became top scorer. At the World Cup, the team failed in the last sixteen round to defending champion Japan and the KNVB separated from Reijners. His successor was initially on an interim basis, the former national player Sarina Wiegman, before Arjan van der Laan took over the office in October 2015 and began his term with a 2–1 victory in France.

== Euro 2017 ==
starting positions in the final

After two failed attempts, the Netherlands won the right to host the 2017 European Championship in December 2014. They defeated 6 other nations and prepared to organise a tournament consisting of 16 teams for the first time. As hosts they were automatically qualified. In the draw held on 8 November, the Dutch were assigned Topf 1 together with defending champion Germany and France and England and set as Group Head in Group 1. Norway, Denmark and neighbor Belgium which participated for the first time, came out of the draw as opponents. With three victories, the Dutch prevailed in the group stage. In the quarter-finals they beat Olympic champion Sweden and in the semi-final England, against whom they achieved their highest victory in a European Championship finals. So they made it into the final for the first time, as did opponent Denmark. In a scorching final, they conceded a goal in the sixth minute and for the first time in the championship were behind, but four minutes later they scored an equalizer and in the 28th minute took the lead. Although they again conceded five minutes later, in the second half they could score two more goals, while the Danes scored no goals. With a total of four goals scored in the knockout rounds Miedema was not only the tournament's second-best scorer, but became the top scorer in the Dutch squad. They won the European Championship title for the first time and improved by five places to seventh place in the FIFA World Ranking published on September 1, 2017, for the first entering the Top 10. Lieke Martens was voted best player in the tournament and a few days later Europe's Footballer of the Year as well.

=== Group A ===
Pos	Team	Pld	W	D	L	GF	GA	GD	Pts	Qualification
1	Netherlands (H)	3	3	0	0	4	1	+3	9	Knockout stage
2	Denmark	3	2	0	1	2	1	+1	6	Knockout stage
3	Belgium	3	1	0	2	3	3	0	3	
4	Norway	3	0	0	3	0	4	−4	0	

Source: UEFA
Rules for classification: Group stage tiebreakers
(H) Hosts
16 July 2017
18:00

Netherlands	1–0	Norway
Van de Sanden 66'	Report

Stadion Galgenwaard, Utrecht
Attendance: 21,732
Referee: Stéphanie Frappart (France)

20 July 2017
20:45

Netherlands	1–0	Denmark
Spitse 20' (pen.)	Report

Sparta Stadion Het Kasteel, Rotterdam
Attendance: 10,599
Referee: Riem Hussein (Germany)

24 July 2017
20:45

Belgium	1–2	Netherlands
Wullaert 59'	Report	Spitse 27' (pen.); Martens 74'

Koning Willem II Stadion, Tilburg
Attendance: 12,697
Referee: Bibiana Steinhaus (Germany)

=== Quarter-finals ===
29 July 2017
18:00

Netherlands	2–0	Sweden
Martens 33'; Miedema 64'	Report

De Vijverberg, Doetinchem
Attendance: 11,106
Referee: Bibiana Steinhaus (Germany)

=== Semi-finals ===
3 August 2017
20:45

Netherlands	3–0	England
Miedema 22'; Van de Donk 62'; Bright 90+3' (o.g.)	Report

De Grolsch Veste, Enschede
Attendance: 27,093
Referee: Stéphanie Frappart (France)

=== Final ===
6 August 2017
17:00

Netherlands	4–2	Denmark
Miedema 10', 89'; Martens 28'; Spitse 51'	Report	Nadim 6' (pen.); Harder 33'

De Grolsch Veste, Enschede
Attendance: 28,182
Referee: Esther Staubli (Switzerland)

== Euro 2022 ==
=== Group C ===
Pos	Team	Pld	W	D	L	GF	GA	GD	Pts	Qualification
1	Sweden	3	2	1	0	8	2	+6	7	Advance to knockout stage
2	Netherlands	3	2	1	0	8	4	+4	7	Advance to knockout stage
3	Switzerland	3	0	1	2	4	8	−4	1	
4	Portugal	3	0	1	2	4	10	−6	1	

Source: UEFA
9 July 2022
20:00

Netherlands	1–1	Sweden
Roord 52'	Report	Andersson 35'

Bramall Lane, Sheffield
Attendance: 21,342
Referee: Cheryl Foster (Wales)

13 July 2022
20:00

Netherlands	3–2	Portugal
Egurrola 7'; Van der Gragt 16'; Van de Donk 62'	Report	C. Costa 38' (pen.); Di. Silva 47'

Leigh Sports Village, Leigh
Attendance: 6,966
Referee: Ivana Martinčić (Croatia)

17 July 2022
17:00

Switzerland	1–4	Netherlands
Reuteler 53'	Report	Crnogorčević 49' (o.g.); Leuchter 84', 90+5'; Pelova 89'

Bramall Lane, Sheffield
Attendance: 22,596
Referee: Iuliana Demetrescu (Romania)

=== Quarter-finals ===
23 July 2022
20:00

France	1–0 (a.e.t.)	Netherlands
Périsset 102' (pen.)	Report

New York Stadium, Rotherham
Attendance: 9,764
Referee: Ivana Martinčić (Croatia)

== Euro 2025 ==
=== Group D ===
Pos	Team	Pld	W	D	L	GF	GA	GD	Pts	Qualification
1	France	3	3	0	0	11	4	+7	9	Advance to knockout stage
2	England	3	2	0	1	11	3	+8	6	Advance to knockout stage
3	Netherlands	3	1	0	2	5	9	−4	3	
4	Wales	3	0	0	3	2	13	−11	0	

Source: UEFA
Rules for classification: Group stage tiebreakers
5 July 2025
18:00

Wales	0–3	Netherlands
	Report	Miedema 45+3'; Pelova 48'; Brugts 57'

Allmend Stadion Luzern, Lucerne
Attendance: 14,147
Referee: Frida Klarlund (Denmark)

9 July 2025
18:00

England	4–0	Netherlands
James 22', 60'; Stanway 45+2'; Toone 67'	Report

Stadion Letzigrund, Zurich
Attendance: 22,600
Referee: Edina Alves Batista (Brazil)

13 July 2025
21:00

Netherlands	2–5	France
Pelova 26'; Bacha 41' (o.g.)	Report	Toletti 22'; Katoto 61'; Cascarino 64', 67'; Karchaoui 90+2' (pen.)

St. Jakob-Park, Basel
Attendance: 34,133
Referee: Ivana Martinčić (Croatia)

== Record ==
Netherlands's UEFA European Championship record
Host nation(s) and year	Result	Pos	Pld	W	D*	L	GF	GA
1984**	Did not qualify							
(Norway) 1987	Did not qualify							
(West Germany) 1989	Did not qualify							
(Denmark) 1991	Did not qualify							
(Italy) 1993	Did not qualify							
(England) (Germany) (Norway) (Sweden) 1995	Did not qualify							
(Norway) 1997	Did not qualify							
(Germany) 2001	Did not qualify							
(England) 2005	Did not qualify							
(Finland) 2009	Semi-finals	3rd	5	2	1	2	6	5
(Sweden) 2013	Group stage	12th	3	0	1	2	0	2
(Netherlands) 2017	Champions	1st	6	6	0	0	13	3
(England) 2022	Quarter-finals	5th	4	2	1	1	8	5
(Switzerland) 2025	Group stage	10th	3	1	0	2	5	9
(Germany) 2029	TBD							
Total	5/14		21	11	3	7	32	24

* Draws include knockout matches decided on penalty kicks.
** Missing flag indicates no host country.

== Head-to-head record ==
Opponent	Pld	W	D	L	GF	GA	GD	Win %
Belgium	1	1	0	0	2	1	+1	100.00
Denmark	3	3	0	0	7	3	+4	100.00
England	3	1	0	2	4	6	−2	33.33
Finland	1	0	0	1	1	2	−1	0.00
France	3	0	1	2	2	6	−4	0.00
Germany	1	0	1	0	0	0	+0	0.00
Iceland	1	0	0	1	0	1	−1	0.00
Norway	2	1	0	1	1	1	+0	50.00
Portugal	1	1	0	0	3	2	+1	100.00
Sweden	2	1	1	0	3	1	+2	50.00
Switzerland	1	1	0	0	4	1	+3	100.00
Ukraine	1	1	0	0	2	0	+2	100.00
Wales	1	1	0	0	3	0	+3	100.00
Total	21	11	3	7	32	24	+8	52.38

== See also ==
- Netherlands at the FIFA Women's World Cup
