= Roos Kwakkenbos =

Dutch footballer

Personal information
- Date of birth: 16 October 1990 (age 36)
- Place of birth: Polsbroek, Netherlands
- Position: Defender

Senior career*
Years	Team	Apps	(Gls)
2007–2010	FC Utrecht		

International career
2007-2008	Netherlands	3	(0)
- * Club domestic league appearances and goals

Roos Kwakkenbos (born 16 October 1990) is a former Dutch football player and manager. Kwakkenbos is head coach of the Dutch under-19 and under-20 women's football teams.

== Biography ==
=== Playing career ===
Kwakkenbos started playing football with amateur club SPV '81 and already woon with VV Schoonhoven. There she played during her youth together with the boys. She moved to FC Utrecht in 2007 where she played until 2010 in the Eredivisie. She made her debut with the Netherlands football team at the age of 16 years old on 1 October 2007 against France. In total she represented the Netherlands three times. She had to retire due knee injury.

=== Coaching career ===
After her retirement she finished her studies at the Academie voor Lichamelijke Opvoeding in Amsterdam. She started becoming a football coach of various youth teams. She started working with the Royal Dutch Football Association since 2018 and became the coach of the under-16 and under-17 national team and since 2001 the head coach of the women's under-19 national team. With Kwakkenbos as head coach the under-19 team reached the semi finals of the 2023 UEFA Women's Under-19 Championship. As the head coach of the under-20 the team played at the 2024 FIFA U-20 Women's World Cup. On June 24, 2025, it was announced that Kwakkenbos would be the assistant coach to Arjan Veurink with the Dutch women's national team.
