= Netherlands women's national under-19 football team =

National U-19 association football team

Netherlands Women's U-19
- Association: Royal Dutch Football Association (Koninklijke Nederlandse Voetbalbond)
- Confederation: UEFA (Europe)
- Head coach: Glenda Van Lieshout
- FIFA code: NED
First colours	Second colours

First international
- Netherlands 2–0 Czech Republic (Torroella de Montgrí; 19 November 1997)

Biggest win
- Netherlands 12–0 Moldova, (17 September 2015); Netherlands 12–0 Latvia, (18 October 2017); Netherlands 12–0 Albania, (3 October 2018)

Biggest defeat
- Netherlands 1–5 Russia, (16 July 2006); Switzerland 7–3 Netherlands, (25 April 2009)

UEFA Women's Under-19 Championship
- Appearances: 12 (first in 1998)
- Best result: Champions, 2014

FIFA U-20 Women's World Cup
- Appearances: 3 (first in 2018)
- Best result: 4th place (2022, 2024)

The Netherlands women's national under-19 football team represents the Netherlands at the UEFA Women's Under-19 Championship and is controlled by the Royal Dutch Football Association.

== Fixtures and results ==
Legend

Win Draw Lose Fixture

=== 2025 ===
26 November 2025 2026 UEFA Women's Under-19 Championship qualification Round 1	Netherlands	2–0	Croatia	Broadwood Stadium, Cumbernauld
12:00 (11:00 UTC+0)	Ivens 64'; Oudenampsen 90+3' (pen.)	Report		Referee: Karoline Wacker (Germany)

29 November 2025 2026 UEFA Women's Under-19 Championship qualification Round 1	Netherlands	1–2	Scotland	Kirkintilloch Community Sports Complex, Glasgow
16:30 (15:30 UTC+0)	Algra 36'	Report	Berry 81' (pen.); Neter 83' (o.g.)	Referee: Miriama Bočková (Slovakia)

2 December 2025 2026 UEFA Women's Under-19 Championship qualification Round 1	Norway	2–1	Netherlands	Broadwood Stadium, Cumbernauld
16:00 (15:00 UTC+0)	Wassink 38' (o.g.); Enger 73'	Report	Guddal 68' (o.g.)	Referee: Miriama Bočková (Slovakia)

=== 2026 ===
11 April 2026 2026 UEFA Women's Under-19 Championship qualification Round 2	Netherlands	1–2	Sweden	Borås Arena, Borås
18:00	Pennock 85'	Report	Priks 42'; Ekberg 75'	Referee: Anastasia Mylopoulou (Greece)

14 April 2026 2026 UEFA Women's Under-19 Championship qualification Round 2	Italy	1–5	Netherlands	Borås Arena, Borås
13:00	Galli 42'	Report	Ivens 10'; Pennock 14'; Van Dijk 21', 33'; Gelevert 76'	Referee: Miriama Bočková (Slovakia)

17 April 2026 2026 UEFA Women's Under-19 Championship qualification Round 2	Ukraine	0–2	Netherlands	Hisingen area, Gothenburg
18:00		Report	Van Dijk 11'; Touzani 63'	Referee: Kristina Georgieva (Bulgaria)

== Coaches ==
- Ruud Dokter
- Bep Timmer
- Ed Engelkes
- Corné Groenendijk
- Hesterine de Reus (2007–2010)
- Johan van Heertum (2010–2012)
- Aart Korenhoff (2012–2013)
- André Koolhof (2013–2015)
- Jessica Torny (2015–2020)
- Roos Kwakkenbos (2021–2023)
- Sherida van Bruggen (2023–2025)
- Glenda Van Lieshout (2025–present)

== Competitive record ==
=== UEFA Women's Under-19 Championship ===
The Dutch team has qualified for the UEFA Under-19 Championship finals on thirteen occasions, winning the tournament in 2014. On that occasion, Vivianne Miedema was the top scorer with six goals and also collected the Golden Player award.

Year	Result	Pld	W	D*	L	GF	GA
Two-legged final 1998	Quarter-finals	2	1	0	1	2	2
(Sweden) 1999	Did not qualify						
(France) 2000	Did not qualify						
(Norway) 2001	Did not qualify						
(Sweden) 2002	Did not qualify						
(Germany) 2003	Group stage	3	1	0	2	4	5
(Finland) 2004	Did not qualify						
(Hungary) 2005	Did not qualify						
(Switzerland) 2006	Group stage	3	0	0	3	1	8
(Iceland) 2007	Did not qualify						
(France) 2008	Did not qualify						
(Belarus) 2009	Did not qualify						
(North Macedonia) 2010	Semi-finals	4	3	1	0	11	0
(Italy) 2011	Group stage	3	0	1	2	2	6
(Turkey) 2012	Did not qualify						
(Wales) 2013	Did not qualify						
(Norway) 2014	Champions	5	4	1	0	9	2
(Israel) 2015	Did not qualify						
(Slovakia) 2016	Semi-finals	4	2	0	2	11	6
(Northern Ireland) 2017	Semi-finals	4	2	1	1	9	6
(Switzerland) 2018	Group stage	3	2	0	1	5	4
(Scotland) 2019	Semi-finals	4	2	0	2	11	6
(Georgia (country)) ~~2020~~	Cancelled						
(Belarus) ~~2021~~	Cancelled						
(Czech Republic) 2022	Did not qualify						
(Belgium) 2023	Semi-finals	4	2	0	2	6	3
(Lithuania) 2024	Runners-up	5	3	1	1	7	3
(Poland) 2025	Group stage	3	1	0	2	2	4
(Bosnia and Herzegovina) 2026	Did not qualify						
(Hungary) 2027	To be determined						
Total	13/25	47	23	5	19	80	55

=== FIFA U-20 Women's World Cup ===
Year	Result	GP	W	D*	L	GF	GA
(Canada) 2002	Did not qualify						
(Thailand) 2004	Did not qualify						
(Russia) 2006	Did not qualify						
(Chile) 2008	Did not qualify						
(Germany) 2010	Did not qualify						
(Japan) 2012	Did not qualify						
(Canada) 2014	Did not qualify						
(Papua New Guinea) 2016	Did not qualify						
(France) 2018	Quarter-finals	4	2	0	2	7	7
(Costa Rica) 2022	Fourth place	6	3	0	3	11	8
(Colombia) 2024	Fourth place	7	2	2	3	10	12
(Poland) 2026	Did not qualify						
Total	3/12	17	7	2	8	28	27

== See also ==
- Netherlands women's national football team
- Netherlands women's national under-17 football team
- FIFA U-20 Women's World Cup
- UEFA Women's Under-19 Championship

== Head-to-head record ==
The following table shows Netherlands' head-to-head record in the FIFA U-20 Women's World Cup.

Opponent	Pld	W	D	L	GF	GA	GD	Win %
Argentina	1	0	1	0	3	3	+0	0.00
Brazil	1	0	0	1	1	4	−3	0.00
Colombia	1	0	1	0	2	2	+0	0.00
Costa Rica	1	1	0	0	2	0	+2	100.00
England	1	0	0	1	1	2	−1	0.00
France	2	1	0	1	2	5	−3	50.00
Ghana	2	2	0	0	8	1	+7	100.00
Japan	2	0	0	2	0	3	−3	0.00
New Zealand	1	1	0	0	2	1	+1	100.00
Nigeria	1	1	0	0	2	0	+2	100.00
North Korea	1	0	0	1	0	2	−2	0.00
Spain	1	0	0	1	1	2	−1	0.00
United States	2	1	0	1	4	2	+2	50.00
Total	17	7	2	8	28	27	+1	41.18
