= UEFA Women's Euro 2025 Group D =

Football tournament group stage

Group D of UEFA Women's Euro 2025 was played from 5 to 13 July 2025. The group was made up of France, title holders England, Wales and the Netherlands. The top two teams of the group, France and England, advanced to the quarter-finals.

== Teams ==
Draw position	Team	Pot	Method of qualification	Date of qualification	Finals appearance	Last appearance	Previous best performance	Euro 2025 qualifying rankings (Note: The UEFA Women's Euro 2025 qualifying ranking was used for seeding for the final draw.)	FIFA Rankings June 2025
D1	France	1	Group A3 winner	12 July 2024	8th	2022	Semi-finals (2022)	3	11
D2	England	2	Group A3 runners-up	16 July 2024	10th	2022	Winners (2022)	7	4
D3	Wales	4	Play-off winner	3 December 2024	1st	—	Debut	20	30
D4	Netherlands	3	Group A1 runners-up	16 July 2024	5th	2022	Winners (2017)	8	10

== Standings ==
Pos	Team	Pld	W	D	L	GF	GA	GD	Pts	Qualification
1	France	3	3	0	0	11	4	+7	9	Advance to knockout stage
2	England	3	2	0	1	11	3	+8	6	Advance to knockout stage
3	Netherlands	3	1	0	2	5	9	−4	3	
4	Wales	3	0	0	3	2	13	−11	0	

Source: UEFA
Rules for classification: Group stage tiebreakers

== Matches ==
=== Wales vs Netherlands ===
5 July 2025
18:00

Wales	0–3	Netherlands
	Report	Miedema 45+3'; Pelova 48'; Brugts 57'

Allmend Stadion Luzern, Lucerne
Attendance: 14,147
Referee: Frida Klarlund (Denmark)

Wales	Netherlands

GK	1	Olivia Clark
RB	6	Josie Green		(substituted off) 64'
CB	5	Rhiannon Roberts
CB	3	Gemma Evans
LB	2	Lily Woodham	(yellow card) 24'
CM	8	Angharad James-Turner (c)
CM	10	Jess Fishlock		(substituted off) 64'
CM	14	Hayley Ladd
RF	7	Ceri Holland		(substituted off) 79'
CF	11	Hannah Cain		(substituted off) 64'
LF	18	Esther Morgan		(substituted off) 46'
Substitutions:
DF	19	Ella Powell		(substituted on) 46'
FW	23	Ffion Morgan		(substituted on) 64'
MF	13	Rachel Rowe		(substituted on) 64'
FW	9	Kayleigh Barton		(substituted on) 64'
FW	20	Carrie Jones		(substituted on) 79'
Manager:
(Canada) Rhian Wilkinson

GK	1	Daphne van Domselaar
RB	18	Kerstin Casparij	(substituted off) 64'
CB	20	Dominique Janssen
CB	4	Veerle Buurman	(substituted off) 81'
LB	11	Esmee Brugts	(substituted off) 71'
CM	14	Jackie Groenen
CM	10	Daniëlle van de Donk	(substituted off) 64'
CM	19	Wieke Kaptein
RF	17	Victoria Pelova
CF	9	Vivianne Miedema (c)	(substituted off) 71'
LF	6	Jill Roord
Substitutions:
FW	12	Chasity Grant	(substituted on) 64'
DF	2	Lynn Wilms	(substituted on) 64'
FW	7	Lineth Beerensteyn	(substituted on) 71'
DF	8	Sherida Spitse	(substituted on) 71'
DF	3	Caitlin Dijkstra	(substituted on) 81'
Manager:
Andries Jonker

Player of the Match:
Vivianne Miedema (Netherlands)

Assistant referees:
Fie Bruun (Denmark)
Heini Hyvönen (Finland)
Fourth official:
Hristiana Guteva (Bulgaria)
Video assistant referee:
Momčilo Marković (Serbia)
Assistant video assistant referee:
Aleandro Di Paolo (Italy)

=== France vs England ===
5 July 2025
21:00

France	2–1	England
Katoto 36'; Baltimore 39'	Report	Walsh 87'

Stadion Letzigrund, Zurich
Attendance: 22,542
Referee: Tess Olofsson (Sweden)

France	England

GK	16	Pauline Peyraud-Magnin	(yellow card) 90+1'
RB	5	Élisa De Almeida		(substituted off) 80'
CB	2	Maëlle Lakrar
CB	4	Alice Sombath
LB	13	Selma Bacha
CM	7	Sakina Karchaoui (c)		(substituted off) 80'
CM	18	Oriane Jean-François
CM	8	Grace Geyoro
RF	17	Sandy Baltimore		(substituted off) 62'
CF	12	Marie-Antoinette Katoto		(substituted off) 62'
LF	20	Delphine Cascarino		(substituted off) 62'
Substitutions:
FW	11	Kadidiatou Diani		(substituted on) 62'
FW	9	Melvine Malard		(substituted on) 62'
FW	14	Clara Mateo		(substituted on) 62'
DF	22	Melween N'Dongala		(substituted on) 80'
MF	6	Sandie Toletti		(substituted on) 80'
Manager:
Laurent Bonadei

GK	1	Hannah Hampton
RB	2	Lucy Bronze
CB	6	Leah Williamson (c)
CB	5	Alex Greenwood		(substituted off) 86'
LB	16	Jess Carter		(substituted off) 60'
CM	7	Lauren James		(substituted off) 60'
CM	4	Keira Walsh
CM	8	Georgia Stanway		(substituted off) 77'
RF	9	Beth Mead		(substituted off) 60'
CF	23	Alessia Russo
LF	11	Lauren Hemp
Substitutions:
DF	3	Niamh Charles		(substituted on) 60'
MF	10	Ella Toone	(yellow card) 75'	(substituted on) 60'
FW	18	Chloe Kelly		(substituted on) 60'
MF	14	Grace Clinton		(substituted on) 77'
FW	17	Michelle Agyemang		(substituted on) 86'
Manager:
(Netherlands) Sarina Wiegman

Player of the Match:
Delphine Cascarino (France)

Assistant referees:
Almira Spahić (Sweden)
Monica Løkkeberg (Norway)
Fourth official:
Maria Sole Ferrieri Caputi (Italy)
Video assistant referee:
Christian Dingert (Germany)
Assistant video assistant referee:
Guillermo Cuadra Fernández (Spain)

=== England vs Netherlands ===
9 July 2025
18:00

England	4–0	Netherlands
James 22', 60'; Stanway 45+2'; Toone 67'	Report

Stadion Letzigrund, Zurich
Attendance: 22,600
Referee: Edina Alves Batista (Brazil)

England	Netherlands

GK	1	Hannah Hampton
RB	2	Lucy Bronze	(substituted off) 84'
CB	6	Leah Williamson (c)
CB	5	Alex Greenwood
LB	16	Jess Carter
CM	10	Ella Toone	(substituted off) 76'
CM	4	Keira Walsh
CM	8	Georgia Stanway
RF	7	Lauren James	(substituted off) 69'
CF	23	Alessia Russo	(substituted off) 84'
LF	11	Lauren Hemp	(substituted off) 76'
Substitutions:
FW	18	Chloe Kelly	(substituted on) 69'
FW	9	Beth Mead	(substituted on) 76'
MF	14	Grace Clinton	(substituted on) 76'
FW	19	Aggie Beever-Jones	(substituted on) 84'
DF	3	Niamh Charles	(substituted on) 84'
Manager:
(Netherlands) Sarina Wiegman

GK	1	Daphne van Domselaar
RB	18	Kerstin Casparij
CB	20	Dominique Janssen
CB	4	Veerle Buurman		(substituted off) 46'
LB	11	Esmee Brugts		(substituted off) 46'
CM	19	Wieke Kaptein
CM	14	Jackie Groenen		(substituted off) 85'
CM	17	Victoria Pelova
RF	12	Chasity Grant
CF	9	Vivianne Miedema (c)		(substituted off) 66'
LF	6	Jill Roord		(substituted off) 46'
Substitutions:
DF	3	Caitlin Dijkstra	(yellow card) 69'	(substituted on) 46'
FW	7	Lineth Beerensteyn		(substituted on) 46'
DF	8	Sherida Spitse		(substituted on) 46'
MF	10	Daniëlle van de Donk		(substituted on) 66'
MF	21	Damaris Egurrola		(substituted on) 85'
Manager:
Andries Jonker

Player of the Match:
Alessia Russo (England)

Assistant referees:
Neuza Back (Brazil)
Fabrini Bevilaqua (Brazil)
Fourth official:
Silvia Gasperotti (Italy)
Video assistant referee:
Tiago Martins (Portugal)
Assistant video assistant referee:
Alen Borošak (Slovenia)

=== France vs Wales ===
9 July 2025
21:00

France	4–1	Wales
Mateo 8'; Diani 45+1' (pen.); Majri 53'; Geyoro 63'	Report	Fishlock 13'

Arena St.Gallen, St. Gallen
Attendance: 15,886
Referee: Désirée Grundbacher (Switzerland)

France	Wales

GK	16	Pauline Peyraud-Magnin
RB	22	Melween N'Dongala
CB	3	Thiniba Samoura
CB	4	Alice Sombath
LB	13	Selma Bacha	(yellow card) 42'	(substituted off) 66'
CM	10	Amel Majri
CM	6	Sandie Toletti		(substituted off) 78'
CM	8	Grace Geyoro (c)		(substituted off) 75'
RF	9	Melvine Malard		(substituted off) 66'
CF	14	Clara Mateo		(substituted off) 75'
LF	11	Kadidiatou Diani
Substitutions:
DF	23	Lou Bogaert		(substituted on) 66'
FW	15	Kelly Gago	(yellow card) 80'	(substituted on) 66'
FW	12	Marie-Antoinette Katoto		(substituted on) 75'
MF	17	Sandy Baltimore		(substituted on) 75'
MF	7	Sakina Karchaoui		(substituted on) 78'
Manager:
Laurent Bonadei

GK	21	Safia Middleton-Patel
RB	18	Esther Morgan
CB	6	Josie Green
CB	3	Gemma Evans
LB	2	Lily Woodham		(substituted off) 64'
CM	9	Kayleigh Barton		(substituted off) 64'
CM	8	Angharad James-Turner (c)
CM	13	Rachel Rowe		(substituted off) 78'
RF	7	Ceri Holland	(yellow card) 79'
CF	10	Jess Fishlock	(yellow card) 21'	(substituted off) 87'
LF	23	Ffion Morgan		(substituted off) 78'
Substitutions:
DF	5	Rhiannon Roberts		(substituted on) 64'
FW	11	Hannah Cain		(substituted on) 64'
MF	17	Lois Joel		(substituted on) 78'
FW	20	Carrie Jones		(substituted on) 78'
MF	4	Sophie Ingle		(substituted on) 87'
Manager:
(Canada) Rhian Wilkinson

Player of the Match:
Amel Majri (France)

Assistant referees:
Susanne Küng (Switzerland)
Linda Schmid (Switzerland)
Fourth official:
Olatz Rivera Olmedo (Spain)
Video assistant referee:
Fedayi San (Switzerland)
Assistant video assistant referee:
Katrin Rafalsky (Germany)

=== Netherlands vs France ===
13 July 2025
21:00

Netherlands	2–5	France
Pelova 26'; Bacha 41' (o.g.)	Report	Toletti 22'; Katoto 61'; Cascarino 64', 67'; Karchaoui 90+2' (pen.)

St. Jakob-Park, Basel
Attendance: 34,133
Referee: Ivana Martinčić (Croatia)

Netherlands	France

GK	1	Daphne van Domselaar
RB	2	Lynn Wilms
CB	8	Sherida Spitse (c)		(substituted off) 84'
CB	20	Dominique Janssen
LB	18	Kerstin Casparij
RM	10	Daniëlle van de Donk		(substituted off) 84'
CM	6	Jill Roord		(substituted off) 68'
CM	14	Jackie Groenen	(yellow card) 45+2'
LM	17	Victoria Pelova	(yellow card) 35'	(substituted off) 90'
CF	12	Chasity Grant		(substituted off) 68'
CF	7	Lineth Beerensteyn
Substitutions:
MF	19	Wieke Kaptein		(substituted on) 68'
FW	11	Esmee Brugts		(substituted on) 68'
DF	3	Caitlin Dijkstra		(substituted on) 84'
MF	21	Damaris Egurrola		(substituted on) 84'
FW	13	Renate Jansen		(substituted on) 90'
Manager:
Andries Jonker

GK	16	Pauline Peyraud-Magnin
RB	5	Élisa De Almeida
CB	3	Thiniba Samoura
CB	4	Alice Sombath	(substituted off) 79'
LB	13	Selma Bacha	(substituted off) 71'
CM	18	Oriane Jean-François
CM	6	Sandie Toletti (c)	(substituted off) 59'
CM	7	Sakina Karchaoui
RF	20	Delphine Cascarino	(substituted off) 71'
CF	12	Marie-Antoinette Katoto	(substituted off) 71'
LF	17	Sandy Baltimore
Substitutions:
MF	8	Grace Geyoro	(substituted on) 59'
FW	14	Clara Mateo	(substituted on) 71'
DF	23	Lou Bogaert	(substituted on) 71'
FW	11	Kadidiatou Diani	(substituted on) 71'
DF	22	Melween N'Dongala	(substituted on) 79'
Manager:
Laurent Bonadei

Player of the Match:
Delphine Cascarino (France)

Assistant referees:
Sanja Rođak-Karšić (Croatia)
Štaša Špur (Slovenia)
Fourth official:
Katalin Kulcsár (Hungary)
Video assistant referee:
Fedayi San (Switzerland)
Assistant video assistant referee:
Momčilo Marković (Serbia)

=== England vs Wales ===
13 July 2025
21:00

England	6–1	Wales
Stanway 13' (pen.); Toone 21'; Hemp 30'; Russo 44'; Mead 72'; Beever-Jones 89'	Report	Cain 76'

Arena St.Gallen, St. Gallen
Attendance: 15,953
Referee: Frida Klarlund (Denmark)

England	Wales

GK	1	Hannah Hampton
RB	2	Lucy Bronze	(substituted off) 79'
CB	6	Leah Williamson (c)
CB	16	Jess Carter
LB	5	Alex Greenwood
CM	8	Georgia Stanway
CM	4	Keira Walsh
CM	10	Ella Toone	(substituted off) 46'
RF	7	Lauren James	(substituted off) 57'
CF	23	Alessia Russo	(substituted off) 57'
LF	11	Lauren Hemp	(substituted off) 46'
Substitutions:
MF	20	Jess Park	(substituted on) 46'
FW	9	Beth Mead	(substituted on) 46'
FW	18	Chloe Kelly	(substituted on) 57'
FW	19	Aggie Beever-Jones	(substituted on) 57'
DF	3	Niamh Charles	(substituted on) 79'
Manager:
(Netherlands) Sarina Wiegman

GK	1	Olivia Clark
RB	18	Esther Morgan
CB	5	Rhiannon Roberts
CB	3	Gemma Evans
LB	2	Lily Woodham		(substituted off) 46'
CM	10	Jess Fishlock
CM	8	Angharad James-Turner (c)
RW	7	Ceri Holland		(substituted off) 65'
AM	20	Carrie Jones		(substituted off) 84'
LW	13	Rachel Rowe		(substituted off) 65'
CF	23	Ffion Morgan		(substituted off) 79'
Substitutions:
DF	6	Josie Green		(substituted on) 46'
DF	14	Hayley Ladd		(substituted on) 65'
FW	11	Hannah Cain		(substituted on) 65'
FW	15	Elise Hughes		(substituted on) 79'
FW	9	Kayleigh Barton		(substituted on) 84'
Other disciplinary actions:
TS	—	(United States) Diego Restrepo	(yellow card) 16'
Manager:
(Canada) Rhian Wilkinson

Player of the Match:
Keira Walsh (England)

Assistant referees:
Fie Bruun (Denmark)
Heini Hyvönen (Finland)
Fourth official:
Iuliana Demetrescu (Romania)
Video assistant referee:
Tiago Martins (Portugal)
Assistant video assistant referee:
Cătălin Popa (Romania)

== Discipline ==
Disciplinary points would have been used as a tiebreaker in the group if teams were tied on overall and head-to-head records, with a lower number of disciplinary points ranking higher. Points were calculated based on yellow and red cards received by players and coaches in all group matches as follows:

- first yellow card: plus 1 point;
- indirect red card (second yellow card): plus 3 points;
- direct red card: plus 3 points;
- yellow card and direct red card: plus 4 points;

Team	Match 1				Match 2				Match 3				Points
Team	Booked	(yellow card) (yellow-red card)	Sent off (straight red)	(yellow card) (red card)	Booked	(yellow card) (yellow-red card)	Sent off (straight red)	(yellow card) (red card)	Booked	(yellow card) (yellow-red card)	Sent off (straight red)	(yellow card) (red card)	Points
England	1												1
France	1				2								3
Netherlands					1				2				3
Wales	1				2				1				4
