= Arjan Veurink =

Dutch football manager (born 1986)

Arjan Veurink MBE
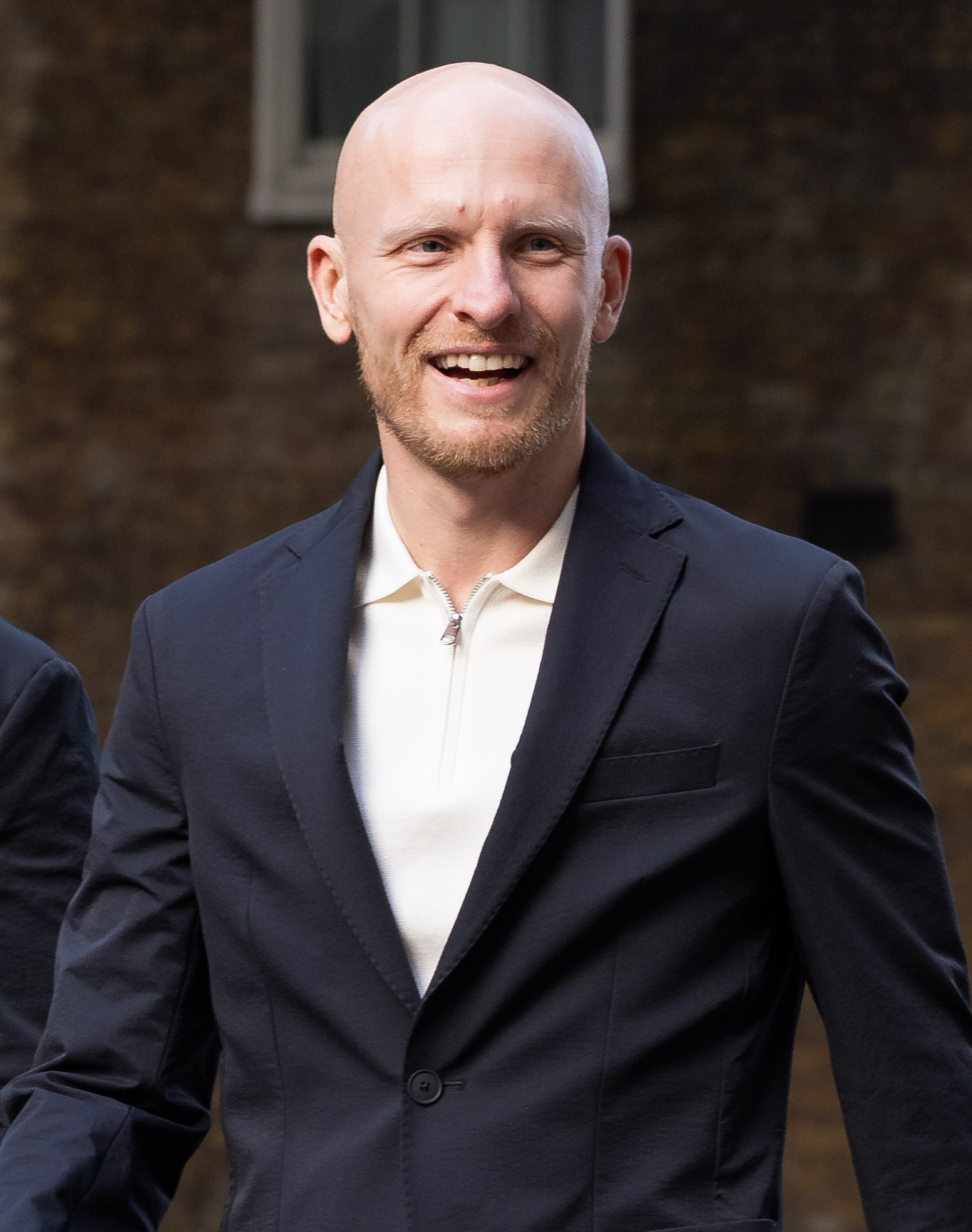
- Veurink in 2025

Personal information
- Date of birth: 23 September 1986 (age 40)
- Place of birth: Ommen, Netherlands

Team information
- Current team: Netherlands Women

Managerial career
- Years: Team
- –2007: OZC (Ommen) youth
- 2008–2010: FC Twente Women (assistant)
- 2010–2012: ATC '65
- 2012–2016: FC Twente Women
- 2017–2021: Netherlands Women (assistant)
- 2021–2025: England Women (assistant)
- 2025–: Netherlands Women
Medal record
Women's football
Representing Netherlands (assistant manager)
UEFA Women's Championship
Winner	2017 Netherlands
FIFA Women's World Cup
Runner-up	2019 France
Representing England (assistant manager)
UEFA Women's Championship
Winner	2022 England
Winner	2025 Switzerland
UEFA–CONMEBOL Finalissima
Winner	2023 England
FIFA Women's World Cup
Runner-up	2023 Australia and New Zealand

Arjan Veurink, MBE (born 23 September 1986) is a Dutch football coach who serves as the Manager of the Netherlands women's national team. He previously served as the head coach of FC Twente women and assistant coach of the Netherlands women's national football team.

== Career ==
=== FC Twente Women ===
In 2012, he was appointed as the head coach of FC Twente women at the age of 25. He served as the head coach until 2016. During his four-year tenure, he led the team to four titles, as well as the KNVB Cup and qualification for the UEFA Women's Champions League. He led them past the round of 32 in 2013–14, 2014–15 and 2015–16.

=== Netherlands Women (assistant) ===
In 2017, he began serving as the assistant coach of the Netherlands women's national football team under Sarina Wiegman. The duo led the Netherlands to the European title in the same year and reached the final of the 2019 FIFA Women's World Cup.

=== England Women (assistant) ===
With Wiegman being appointed as the head coach of the England women's national Football team on a four-year contract in August 2020, he was set to follow suit to serve as her assistant. In January 2021, the Royal Dutch Football Association (KNVB) approved her request for Veurink to move along with her as she was set to start her role in September 2021 after the delayed 2020 Summer Olympics in Tokyo.

=== Netherlands Women ===
In April 2025, the KNVB announced that Arjan Veurink would replace Andries Jonker as coach of the Dutch national team following the UEFA Women's Euro 2025 tournament.

== Honours ==
Manager

FC Twente

- BeNe League: 2012–13, 2013–14
- Dutch championship: 2012–13,* 2013–14,* 2014–15,* 2015–16
- KNVB Cup: 2014–15

Assistant manager

Netherlands Women

- UEFA Women's Championship: 2017
- FIFA Women's World Cup runner-up: 2019

England Women

- UEFA Women's Championship: 2022, 2025
- Women's Finalissima: 2023
- Arnold Clark Cup: 2022, 2023
- FIFA Women's World Cup runner-up: 2023

Individual

- Honorary Member of the Order of the British Empire (MBE): 2024 Special Honours, for services to football.

Notes

*During the BeNe League period (2012 to 2015), the highest placed Dutch team is considered as national champion by the Royal Dutch Football Association.
