= Sandra Muller =

Dutch footballer (born 1980)

Personal information
- Date of birth: 31 May 1980 (age 46)
- Place of birth: The Netherlands
- Position: Forward

International career
| Years | Team | Apps | (Gls) |
| 1997–2006 | Netherlands | 56 | (9) |

Sandra Muller (born 31 May 1980) is a Dutch former footballer who played as a forward for the Netherlands women's national football team between 1997 and 2006.
