= Netherlands women's national football team =

Women's national association football team representing the Netherlands

Netherlands
- Nickname(s): Oranje (Orange); Leeuwinnen (Lionesses)
- Association: Royal Dutch Football Association (Koninklijke Nederlandse Voetbalbond)
- Confederation: UEFA (Europe)
- Head coach: Arjan Veurink
- Captain: Dominique Janssen
- Most caps: Sherida Spitse (248)
- Top scorer: Vivianne Miedema (104)
- FIFA code: NED
First colours	Second colours

FIFA ranking
- Current: 11 ▼1 (20 October 2026)
- Highest: 3 (July – December 2019; April 2021)
- Lowest: 20 (June – September 2008)

First international
- (unofficial); West Germany 2–1 Netherlands (Essen, Germany; 23 September 1956) (FIFA recognised); France 4–0 Netherlands (Hazebrouck, France; 17 April 1971)

Biggest win
- Netherlands 15–0 Indonesia (Doetinchem, Netherlands; 25 October 2024)

Biggest defeat
- Sweden 7–0 Netherlands (Borås, Sweden; 26 September 1981)

World Cup
- Appearances: 3 (first in 2015)
- Best result: Runners-up (2019)

Olympic Games
- Appearances: 1 (first in 2020)
- Best result: Quarter-finals (2020)

European Championship
- Appearances: 5 (first in 2009)
- Best result: Champions (2017)

Nations League Finals
- Appearances: 1 (first in 2024)
- Best result: Fourth place (2024)
Medal record
FIFA Women's World Cup
Silver medal – second place	2019 France	Team
UEFA Women's Championship
Gold medal – first place	2017 Netherlands	Team
Bronze medal – third place	2009 Finland	Team

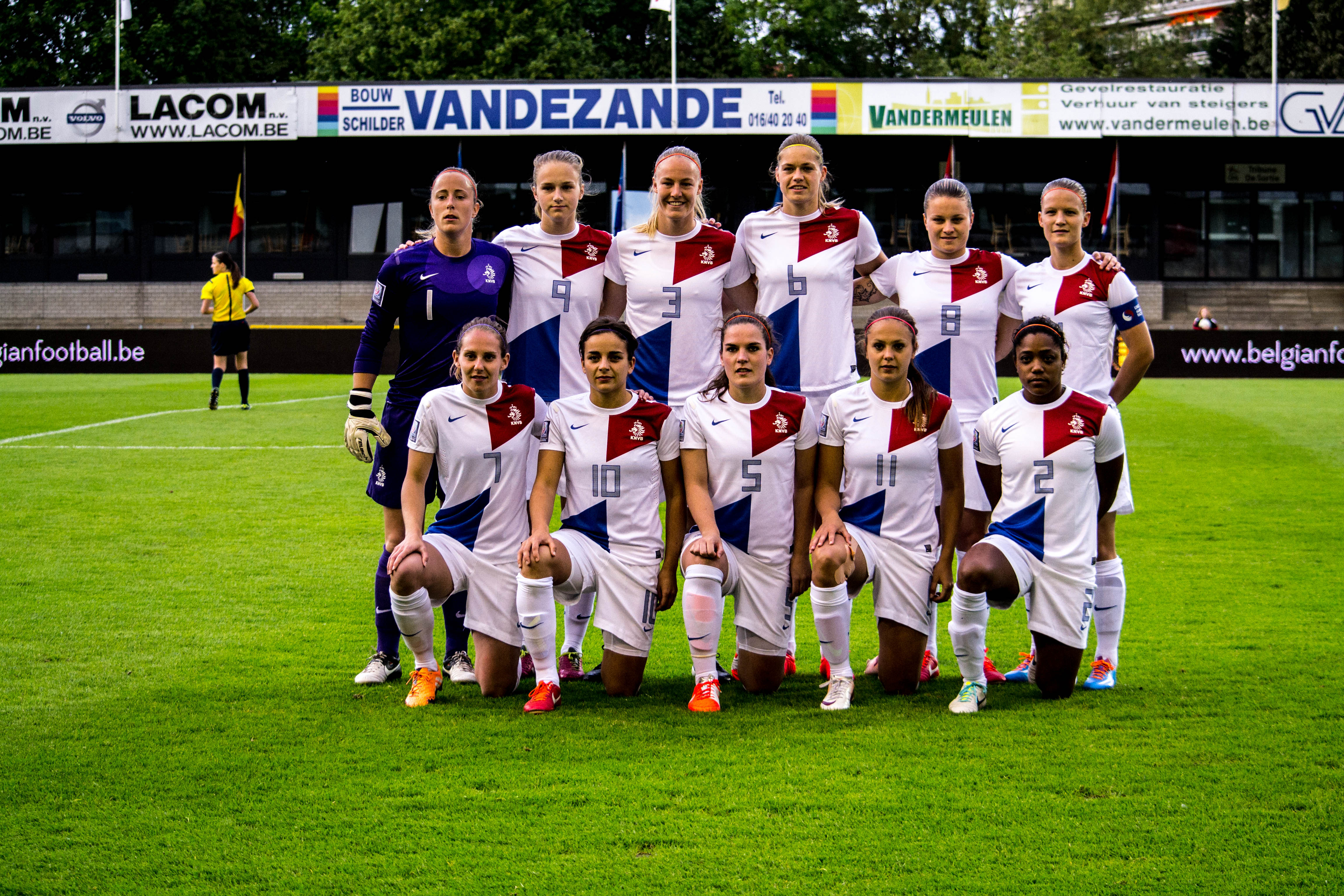
Netherlands women's national football team in May 2014

The Netherlands women's national football team (Dutch: Nederlands vrouwenvoetbalelftal) represents the Netherlands in international women's football, and is directed by the Royal Dutch Football Association (KNVB), which is a member of UEFA and FIFA.

In 1971, the team played the first women's international football match recognised by FIFA against France. They played at the final tournament of the UEFA Women's Championship four times and were champions in 2017 as hosts. They qualified for the World Cup three times, reaching the final of the 2019 edition of the World Cup, losing 2–0 against the United States. The result of the 2019 World Cup meant that the Netherlands team qualified for 2020 Olympics where they lost in the quarter-finals.

The Netherlands was one of numerous countries where women's football was banned for a long time, and received scepticism afterwards. The team grew in popularity during and after their surprise victory on home soil at the 2017 Euros.

The nicknames for the team are the Oranje (Orange) and the Leeuwinnen (Lionesses). The Dutch women's team's logo features a lioness, making it different from the men's team's logo, which sports a male lion. The team plays in bright orange, the historic national colour of the Netherlands. Arjan Veurink became the head coach of the team since the conclusion of the UEFA Women's Euro 2025.

== History ==
On 17 April 1971, the Dutch team played the first women's international football match recognized by FIFA against France. The match took place in Hazebrouck, France and resulted in a 4–0 defeat for the Netherlands, with Jocelyne Ratignier and Marie-Claire Caron-Harant scoring for France.

In 1980s and 1990s, the team failed to qualify for the final tournaments of UEFA Championship and later the FIFA World Cup. The Royal Dutch Football Association began major investments into women's football in the 2000s, culminating in the establishment of the women's Eredivisie in 2007 (which merged with the Belgian league for two seasons starting in 2012). This resulted in the team qualifying for a major tournament for the first time at the UEFA Women's Euro 2009. They finished in third place, together with Norway, behind second placed England and winners Germany (first place). The team again qualified for the UEFA Women's Euro 2013, but did not advance after the group stage.

The team qualified for the 2015 FIFA Women's World Cup and reached thirteenth place, losing their first match in the knockout stage to Japan.

In 2017, the Netherlands won their first major women's trophy, ending Germany's seemingly unbeatable reign over the UEFA Women's Championship and winning the tournament on home soil, beating Denmark 4–2 in the final. The successful campaign in which the Oranje managed to win all of their matches highly contributed to the popularity of women's football in the Netherlands.

In 2018, the Netherlands finished second in their UEFA Qualifying group behind Norway. Therefore, they had to go through the UEFA play-off to qualify for the 2019 World Cup. Switzerland, Belgium, and Denmark were the other teams in the play-off. The Netherlands beat Denmark 4–1 on aggregate in the play-off semi-finals and repeated that result against Switzerland over two legs in the play-off final to qualify. In the 2019 World Cup, the Netherlands had another strong performance, reaching the final before losing 2–0 to the United States.

They qualified for the 2020 Summer Olympics thanks to their position at the 2019 World Cup where they finished among the three best European teams. The Netherlands passed the 1st round at their first Olympic participation, finishing at the top of their group thanks to two large victories (10–3 against Zambia and 8–2 against China) and a draw (3–3 against Brazil), displaying an attractive offensive game but a certain defensive frailty, conceding 8 goals in the group stage. However, their journey ended in the quarter-finals against the United States, an opponent who had already played the role of tormentor of the Oranje in the final of the World Cup two years earlier, losing in penalty kicks (2–2, 2 pts to 4). Lieke Martens missed a decisive penalty in the 81st minute of the game when the score was tied 2–2.

Coach Sarina Wiegman left the team after the Olympics and was replaced by Englishman Mark Parsons. The Netherlands reached UEFA Women's Euro 2022 in England with a perfect record of ten victories in qualification. In England, the Netherlands passed the group stage thanks to victories over Switzerland and Portugal. A draw against Sweden however meant the team had to face France in the quarterfinals. Although they only lost in extra time, they were thoroughly outplayed, and it was decided to part ways with Parsons.

Andries Jonker took over coaching responsibilities and was immediately faced with a must-win game against Iceland to avoid the play-offs for the 2023 World Cup. In a tense game, Esmee Brugts scored the desperately needed goal only in stoppage time and the Netherlands qualified for their third World Cup.

At the 2023 World Cup, Netherlands were in Group E along with the U.S., Portugal, and Vietnam. It started with a 1–0 win over Portugal, followed this with a 1–1 draw with the U.S., and finished with a 7–0 victory over Vietnam to top the group. After defeating South Africa in the first knockout match, the team lost to eventual champion Spain in the quarter-finals after extra time.

In April 2025, the KNVB announced that Arjan Veurink will succeed Jonker as coach after the UEFA Women's Euro 2025 tournament. Jonker's final team performed poorly, losing to England and France and failing to advance from its group.

== Team image ==
=== Nicknames ===
The Netherlands women's national football team is known or nicknamed as both the "Leeuwinnen" (Lionesses) and "Oranje" (Orange).

== Results and fixtures ==
The following is a list of match results in the last 12 months, as well as any future matches that have been scheduled.

Legend

Win Draw Loss Fixture

=== 2025 ===
28 November Friendly	Portugal	1–2	Netherlands	Braga
20:45				Stadium: Estadio Municipal de Braga

2 December Friendly	Netherlands	5–0	South Korea	Waalwijk, Netherlands
20:45	Miedema 9', 17', 31', 38'; Peddemors 43'	Report

=== 2026 ===
3 March 2027 FIFA Women's World Cup qualification	Poland	2–2	Netherlands	Gdańsk
18:00	Pajor 24'; Tomasiak 84'	Report (FIFA); Report (UEFA)	Buurman 44'; Roord 47'	Stadium: Gdańsk Stadium; Attendance: 3,540; Referee: Ivana Projkovska (North Macedonia)

7 March 2027 FIFA Women's World Cup qualification	Netherlands	2–1	Republic of Ireland	Utrecht
20:45	Beerensteyn 20', 82'	Report	McCabe 50' (pen.)	Stadium: Stadion Galgenwaard; Attendance: 12,244; Referee: Frida Klarlund (Denmark)

14 April 2027 FIFA Women's World Cup qualification	Netherlands	2–1	France	Breda
20:45	van Asten 11'; Brugts 68'	Report	Baltimore 54'	Stadium: Rat Verlegh Stadion; Attendance: 6,503; Referee: Tess Olofsson (Sweden)

18 April 2027 FIFA Women's World Cup qualification	France	1–1	Netherlands	Auxerre
21:10	Katoto 45+1'	Report	Kaptein 76'	Stadium: Stade de l'Abbé-Deschamps; Attendance: 8,334; Referee: Maria Sole Ferrieri Caputi (Italy)

5 June 2027 FIFA Women's World Cup qualification	Republic of Ireland	3–2	Netherlands	Cork
20:30 (19:30 UTC+1)	Carusa 19'; Larkin 71'; Barrett 90'	Report	Janssen 70' (pen.); Pelova 81'	Stadium: Páirc Uí Chaoimh; Attendance: 12,569; Referee: Katalin Kulcsár (Hungary)

9 June 2027 FIFA Women's World Cup qualification	Netherlands	3–1	Poland	Almelo
21:00	Kaptein 24'; Leuchter 61'; Rijsbergen 81'	Report	Kamczyk 83' (pen.)	Stadium: Asito Stadion; Attendance: 8,021; Referee: Fabienne Michel (Germany)

9 October 2026 World Cup play-offs	Hungary	0–8	Netherlands	Felcsút
20:00		Report (FIFA); Report (UEFA)	Beerensteyn 12', 14', 90+1'; Pelova 26', 58', 62'; Brugts 45+1'; Egurrola 49'	Stadium: Pancho Aréna; Attendance: 756; Referee: Olga Blotskaya (Belarus)

13 October 2027 FIFA Women's World Cup play-offs	Netherlands	3–0	Hungary	Tilburg
20:45	Brugts 8'; Beerensteyn 40'; Egurrola 45+4'	Report (FIFA); Report (UEFA)		Stadium: Koning Willem II Stadion; Referee: Franziska Wildfeuer (Germany)

1 December 2027 FIFA Women's World Cup play-offs	Slovenia	v	Netherlands	Domžale
				Stadium: Domžale Sports Park

5 December 2027 FIFA Women's World Cup play-offs	Netherlands	v	Slovenia	Utrecht
				Stadium: Stadion Galgenwaard

== Coaching staff ==
=== Current coaching staff ===
As of 1 August 2025

Position	Name
Head coach	(Netherlands) Arjan Veurink
Assistant coach	(Netherlands) Roos Kwakkenbos (Netherlands) Martijn Reuser
Goalkeeping coach	(Netherlands) Eline Sol

=== Head coaches ===
Period	Coach	Notes	Ref(s)
1972–1973	Siem Plooyer		
1973–1974	Bert Wouterse		
1974–1975	Ger Blok		
1975–1977	Ron Groenewoud		
1977–1978	Ruud de Groot		
1979–1987	Bert van Lingen		
1987	Nick Labohm	1 match (3–1 defeat to West Germany on 1 April 1987)	
1987	Dick Advocaat	1 match (0–0 against Norway on 23 May 1987)	
1987–1989	Piet Buter		
1989–1992	Bert van Lingen	second spell as coach (first spell from 1979 to 1987)	
1992–1995	Jan Derks		
1995–2001	Ruud Dokter		
2001	Andries Jonker	interim coach	
2001–2004	Frans de Kat		
2004	Remy Reynierse	interim coach	
2004–2010	Vera Pauw		
2010	Ed Engelkes	interim coach	
2010–2015	Roger Reijners		
2015	Sarina Wiegman	interim coach	
2015–2016	Arjan van der Laan		
2016–2017	Sarina Wiegman	second spell as interim coach (first spell in 2015)	
2017–2021	Sarina Wiegman	permanent coach	
2021–2022	(England) Mark Parsons		
2022–2025	Andries Jonker	second spell as coach (first spell as interim in 2001)	
2025–present	Arjan Veurink		

==== Coaches' records ====
#	Name	Period	Matches
1	(Netherlands) Sarina Wiegman^{1}	2015–2021	86
2	(Netherlands) Vera Pauw	2004–2010	73
3	(Netherlands) Roger Reijners	2010–2015	71
4	(Netherlands) Ruud Dokter	1995–2000	64
5	(Netherlands) Bert van Lingen	1979–1986, 1989–1991	46
6	(Netherlands) Andries Jonker	2001, 2022–2025	43
7	(Netherlands) Frans de Kat	2001–2004	27
8	(Netherlands) Jan Derks	1991–1994	19
9	(England) Mark Parsons	2021–2022	18
10	(Netherlands) Arjan van der Laan	2015–2016	16
11	(Netherlands) Piet Buter	1987–1989	15
12	(Netherlands) Ruud de Groot	1977–1978	8

As of 13 August 2023

1. Includes 70 matches main coach (period 2017–2021), 1 match against Belarus – 8:0 as Interim coach (17.09.2015), 15 matches assistant coach (29.11.2015 – first match and 29.11.2016 – last match). Onsoranje.nl includes 8 matches from 15, coached Sarina by main coach instead assistant, Therefore, it turns out 79 (70+1+8). Main coach – 70 matches + 1 match in 2015.

== Players ==
=== Current squad ===
The following 23 players were called up for the 2027 FIFA Women's World Cup qualification play-off matches against Slovenia on 1 and 5 December 2026.

Caps and goals correct as of 13 October 2026, after the match against Hungary.

No.	Pos.	Player	Date of birth (age)	Caps	Goals	Club
	GK	Daphne van Domselaar	6 March 2000 (age 26)	39	0	(The Football Association) Arsenal
	GK	Lize Kop	17 March 1998 (age 28)	25	0	(The Football Association) Tottenham Hotspur
	GK	Daniëlle de Jong	11 October 2002 (age 24)	1	0	(Italian Football Federation) Juventus
	DF	Dominique Janssen (captain)	17 January 1995 (age 31)	138	7	(The Football Association) Manchester United
	DF	Lynn Wilms	3 October 2000 (age 26)	66	3	(The Football Association) Aston Villa
	DF	Kerstin Casparij	19 August 2000 (age 26)	55	0	(The Football Association) Manchester City
	DF	Caitlin Dijkstra	30 January 1999 (age 27)	36	1	(The Football Association) Tottenham Hotspur
	DF	Veerle Buurman	21 April 2006 (age 20)	20	2	(The Football Association) Chelsea
	DF	Marisa Olislagers	9 September 2000 (age 26)	20	0	(The Football Association) Brighton & Hove Albion
	DF	Janou Levels	30 October 2000 (age 26)	7	0	(Royal Spanish Football Federation) Real Madrid
	DF	Renee van Asten	7 October 2006 (age 20)	3	1	(Royal Spanish Football Federation) Barcelona
	MF	Daniëlle van de Donk	5 August 1991 (age 35)	176	38	(The Football Association) London City Lionesses
	MF	Jackie Groenen	17 December 1994 (age 31)	133	10	(French Football Federation) Paris Saint-Germain
	MF	Jill Roord	22 April 1997 (age 29)	117	31	(Royal Dutch Football Association) Twente
	MF	Victoria Pelova	3 June 1999 (age 27)	73	10	(The Football Association) Tottenham Hotspur
	MF	Damaris Egurrola	26 August 1999 (age 27)	55	9	(French Football Federation) Lyon
	MF	Wieke Kaptein (third captain)	29 August 2005 (age 21)	35	4	(The Football Association) Chelsea
	MF	Ella Peddemors	6 August 2002 (age 24)	8	1	(German Football Association) VfL Wolfsburg
	FW	Lineth Beerensteyn (vice-captain)	11 October 1996 (age 30)	127	45	(Royal Spanish Football Federation) Real Madrid
	FW	Esmee Brugts	28 July 2003 (age 23)	59	14	(Royal Spanish Football Federation) Barcelona
	FW	Lotte Keukelaar	25 September 2005 (age 21)	9	2	(Royal Spanish Football Federation) Real Madrid
	FW	Liz Rijsbergen	14 February 2002 (age 24)	2	1	(Royal Dutch Football Association) PSV
	FW	Sophie Proost	11 March 2007 (age 19)	0	0	(German Football Association) Bayern Munich

=== Recent call-ups ===
The following players have also been called up to the squad in the past 12 months.

Pos.	Player	Date of birth (age)	Caps	Goals	Club	Latest call-up
GK	Femke Liefting	2 January 2005 (age 21)	0	0	(Netherlands) Ajax	v. Hungary, 13 October 2026
GK	Regina van Eijk	9 March 2002 (age 24)	0	0	(Germany) Bayern Munich	v. Hungary, 13 October 2026
DF	Isa Kardinaal	31 May 2005 (age 21)	1	0	(England) London City Lionesses	v. Hungary, 13 October 2026
DF	Ilse van der Zanden	25 July 1995 (age 31)	5	0	(Italy) Fiorentina	v. Poland, 9 June 2026
DF	Linde Veefkind	25 August 2001 (age 25)	0	0	(Germany) RB Leipzig	v. France, 18 April 2026
DF	Lieske Carleer	16 April 2001 (age 25)	2	0	(Germany) VfL Wolfsburg	v. Republic of Ireland, 7 March 2026 ^{INJ}
MF	Nina Nijstad	5 March 2003 (age 23)	4	2	(United States) Portland Thorns	v. Poland, 9 June 2026
MF	Kayleigh van Dooren	31 July 1999 (age 27)	5	0	(Italy) Roma	v. France, 18 April 2026
MF	Lynn Groenewegen	17 November 2003 (age 23)	2	0	(Netherlands) Twente	v. France, 18 April 2026
FW	Chasity Grant	19 April 2001 (age 25)	26	2	(England) Aston Villa	v. Hungary, 13 October 2026
FW	Romée Leuchter	12 January 2001 (age 25)	32	6	(France) Paris Saint-Germain	v. Poland, 9 June 2026
FW	Vivianne Miedema	15 July 1996 (age 30)	132	104	(England) Manchester City	v. France, 18 April 2026 ^{INJ}
FW	Danique Tolhoek	17 March 2005 (age 21)	1	0	(Germany) Eintracht Frankfurt	v. South Korea, 2 December 2025
Notes: ^{INJ} = Withdrew due to injury; ^{PRE} = Preliminary squad / standby; ^{RET} = Retired from the national team; ^{WD} = Player withdrew from the squad due to non-injury issue.

== Individual records ==
As of 13 October 2026
Players in bold are still active with the Netherlands.

Most appearances
Rank	Player	Career	Caps	Goals
1	Sherida Spitse	2006–2025	248	46
2	**Daniëlle van de Donk**	2010–present	176	38
3	Lieke Martens	2011–2024	160	62
4	Annemieke Kiesel-Griffioen	1995–2011	156	19
5	Dyanne Bito	2000–2015	146	6
6	Marleen Wissink	1989–2006	141	0
7	Daphne Koster	1997–2013	139	7
8	**Dominique Janssen**	2014–present	138	7
9	Manon Melis	2004–2016	136	59
10	**Jackie Groenen**	2016–present	133	10

Top goalscorers
Rank	Player	Career	Goals	Caps	Avg.
1	**Vivianne Miedema**	2013–present	104	132	0.79
2	Lieke Martens	2011–2024	62	160	0.39
3	Manon Melis	2005–2016	59	136	0.43
4	Sherida Spitse	2006–2025	46	248	0.19
5	**Lineth Beerensteyn**	2016–present	45	127	0.35
6	**Daniëlle van de Donk**	2010–present	38	176	0.22
7	**Jill Roord**	2016–present	31	117	0.26
8	Sylvia Smit	2004–2013	30	106	0.28
9	Marjoke de Bakker	1979–1991	29	61	0.48
10	**Shanice van de Sanden**	2008–present	21	97	0.22

== Competitive record ==
=== FIFA Women's World Cup ===
On 27 November 2014, the Netherlands national football team qualified to the final tournament of the FIFA Women's World Cup for the first time. In 2019, they reached the Final and lost to the United States team.

FIFA Women's World Cup record									Qualification record					
Host nation and year	Result	Pos	Pld	W	D*	L	GF	GA	Pld	W	D*	L	GF	GA
(China) 1991	Did not qualify								Did not participate					
(Sweden) 1995	Did not qualify								Did not participate					
(United States) 1999	Did not qualify								6	2	1	3	5	10
(United States) 2003	Did not qualify								6	1	1	4	6	16
(China) 2007	Did not qualify								8	5	0	3	15	7
(Germany) 2011	Did not qualify								8	5	2	1	30	7
(Canada) 2015	Round of 16	13th	4	1	1	2	3	4	14	11	2	1	50	9
(France) 2019	Runners-up	2nd	7	6	0	1	11	5	12	9	2	1	30	4
(Australia) (New Zealand) 2023	Quarter-finals	7th	5	3	1	1	12	3	8	6	2	0	30	3
(Brazil) 2027	To be determined								To be determined					
(Costa Rica) (Jamaica) (Mexico) (United States) 2031	To be determined								To be determined					
(United Kingdom) 2035	To be determined								To be determined					
Total:3/10	Runners-up	2nd	16	10	2	4	26	12	62	39	10	13	166	56

- Draws include knockout matches decided on penalty kicks.

=== Olympic Games ===
Since the inception of women's Olympic football, UEFA has designated the World Cup as its qualifying tournament for the succeeding Olympic tournament. Because the Netherlands failed to qualify to the World Cup until 2015, the Netherlands women automatically failed to qualify for the Olympics up to 2012. In 2015 Netherlands made it to their first World Cup. Their round of 16 exit was good enough for a post World Cup mini tournament to decide UEFA's last spot at the Olympics. Sweden won that tournament and the Netherlands were eliminated. In 2019 the Netherlands reached the World Cup final and qualified for the Olympics for the first time.

(International Olympic Committee) Summer Olympics record
Host nation and year	Round	Pos	Pld	W	D*	L	GF	GA
(United States) 1996	Did not qualify							
(Australia) 2000	Did not qualify							
(Greece) 2004	Did not qualify							
(China) 2008	Did not qualify							
(United Kingdom) 2012	Did not qualify							
(Brazil) 2016	Did not qualify							
(Japan) 2020	Quarter-finals	5th	4	2	2	0	23	10
(France) 2024	Did not qualify							
(United States) 2028	To be determined							
(Australia) 2032	To be determined							
Total:1/8	Quarter-finals	5th	4	2	2	0	23	10

=== UEFA European Women's Championship ===
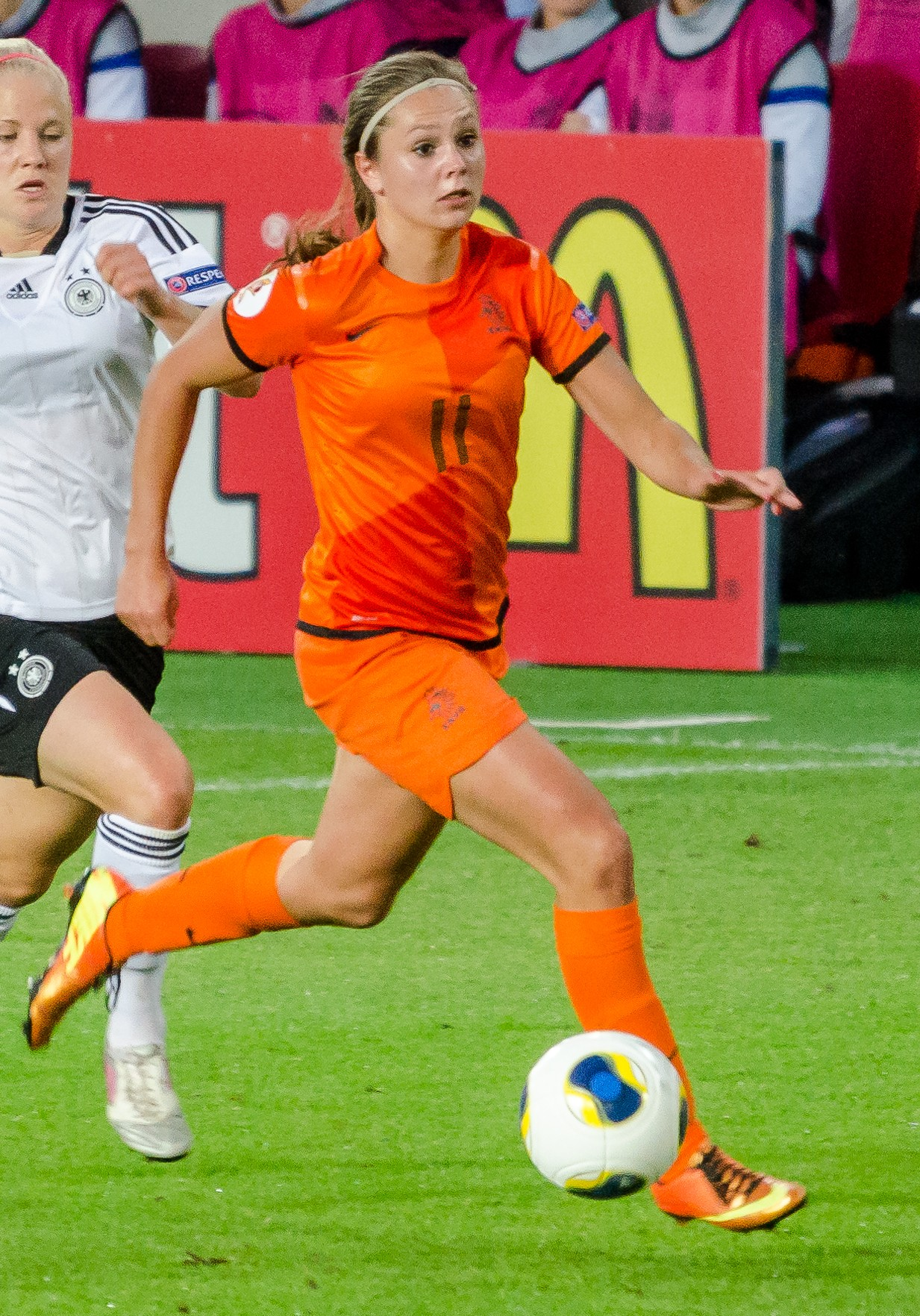
Lieke Martens playing against Germany at UEFA Women's Euro 2013

The Dutch failed to qualify for the final tournament of the UEFA Women's Championship from 1984 to 2005. In 2009, the Netherlands women's team qualified and reached third place. In 2013, they qualified again, but did not advance beyond the group stage. The Dutch women booked a major victory at the 2017 tournament: after a 4–2 victory over Denmark in the final they were the new European champion. Furthermore, Lieke Martens was named the best player of the tournament. In 2022 they were knocked out in the quarter final.

UEFA European Women's Championship record									Qualifying record							
Host nation(s) and year	Result	Pos	Pld	W	D*	L	GF	GA	Pld	W	D*	L	GF	GA	P/R	Rnk
1984**	Did not qualify								6	2	2	2	12	9	–	
(Norway) 1987	Did not qualify								6	5	0	1	14	6	–	
(West Germany) 1989	Did not qualify								6	3	1	2	5	5	–	
(Denmark) 1991	Did not qualify								6	3	2	1	17	1	–	
(Italy) 1993	Did not qualify								6	2	2	2	6	7	–	
(England) (Germany) (Norway) (Sweden) 1995	Did not qualify								4	2	0	2	7	3	–	
(Norway) 1997	Did not qualify								8	3	2	3	7	9	–	
(Germany) 2001	Did not qualify								8	2	3	3	10	10	–	
(England) 2005	Did not qualify								8	2	1	5	7	13	–	
(Finland) 2009	Semi-finals	3rd	5	2	1	2	6	5	10	5	3	2	16	12	–	
(Sweden) 2013	Group stage	12th	3	0	1	2	0	2	8	6	1	1	20	2	–	
(Netherlands) 2017	Champions	1st	6	6	0	0	13	3	Qualified as Host							
(England) 2022	Quarter-finals	5th	4	2	1	1	8	5	10	10	0	0	48	3	–	
(Switzerland) 2025	Group stage	10th	3	1	0	2	5	9	6	2	3	1	4	4	(Note: From Euro 2025 onwards a new qualifying format was introduced, linked to the Women's Nations League where teams are divided into leagues with promotion/relegation between the leagues at the end of each cycle.)	8th
(Germany) 2029	TBD								TBD							
Total:1/8	1 title		21	11	3	7	32	24	92	47	20	25	173	84	8th	

* Draws include knockout matches decided on penalty kicks.
** No host country.

=== UEFA Women's Nations League ===
UEFA Women's Nations League record
League phase										Finals							
Season	Lg	Pld	W	D	L	GF	GA	P/R	RK	Year	Pos	Pld	W	D	L	GF	GA
2023–24	A	6	4	0	2	14	6	Same position	4th	(France) (Netherlands) (Spain) 2024	4th	2	0	0	2	0	5
2025	A	6	2	3	1	4	4	Same position	8th	2025	Did not qualify						
Total		12	6	3	3	18	10			Total	0 Titles	2	0	0	2	0	5

* Draws include knockout matches decided on penalty kicks.

▲	Promoted at end of season
Same position	No movement at end of season
▼	Relegated at end of season
*	Participated in promotion/relegation play-offs

=== Competitive results ===
- All results list the Netherlands goal tally first.
- Goal scorers are sorted alphabetically.
- Colors gold, silver, and bronze indicate first-, second-, and third-place finishes.

Abbreviation Key table
EC	European Championship
WC	World Cup
OG	Olympic Games
NL	Nations League
QS	Qualification stage/tournament

Competition	Stage	Result	Opponent	Position	Scorers
1984 EC QS	Group Stage: Gr.4	2–3 (a), 5–0 (h)	Belgium	2 / 4	Camper, Fortuin, De Haan, De Jong-Desaunois, Timisela, Timmer, De Visser
1984 EC QS	Group Stage: Gr.4	2–1 (h), 0–2 (a)	Denmark	2 / 4	De Bakker, Camper
1984 EC QS	Group Stage: Gr.4	2–2 (h), 1–1 (a)	West Germany	2 / 4	Camper, De Visser (2)
1987 EC QS	Group Stage: Gr.3	1–0 (h), 5–3 (a)	France	2 / 4	Allott (4), De Bakker, Camper
1987 EC QS	Group Stage: Gr.3	0–2 (a), 2–0 (h)	Sweden	2 / 4	De Bakker, Vestjens
1987 EC QS	Group Stage: Gr.3	3–1 (a), 3–0 (h)	Belgium	2 / 4	Allott (2), De Bakker, Boogerd, Timisela (2)
1989 EC QS	Group Stage: Gr.2	0–0 (a), 1–0 (h)	Sweden	1 / 4	De Bakker
1989 EC QS	Group Stage: Gr.2	4–0 (h), w/o	Scotland ^{a}	1 / 4	De Bakker (2), Timisela, Wiegman
1989 EC QS	Group Stage: Gr.2	1–0 (a), 2–0 (h)	(Republic of Ireland) Ireland	1 / 4	De Bakker, Timisela, De Winter
1989 EC QS	Quarter-finals	1–2 (a), 0–3 (h)	Norway		De Bakker
1991 EC QS	Group Stage: Gr.1	2–0 (h), 0–0 (a)	(Republic of Ireland) Ireland	1 / 3	Vestjens (2)
1991 EC QS	Group Stage: Gr.1	6–0 (a), 9–0 (h)	Northern Ireland	1 / 3	Baal, De Bakker (6), Geeris, Limbeek (2), Pauw, Timisela (2), Vestjens, Van Waarden
1991 EC QS	Quarter-finals	0–0 (a), 0–1 (a.e.t.) (h)	Denmark		
1993 EC QS	Group Stage: Gr.5	3–0 (a), 2–0 (h)	Greece	1 / 3	Geeris (3), Limbeek, Timisela
1993 EC QS	Group Stage: Gr.5	1–1 (h), 0–0 (a)	Romania	1 / 3	Van der Ploeg
1993 EC QS	Quarter-finals	0–3 (h), 0–3 (a)	Norway		
1995 EC QS	Group Stage: Gr.8	1–2 (a), 0–1 (h)	Iceland	2 / 3	Leemans
1995 EC QS	Group Stage: Gr.8	2–0 (h), 4–0 (a)	Greece	2 / 3	Van Dam (2), Keereweer, Limbeek, Noom, Roos
1997 EC QS	Group Stage: Gr.2 (Class A)	0–2 (h), 0–2 (a)	Iceland	4 / 4	
1997 EC QS	Group Stage: Gr.2 (Class A)	1–1 (h), 1–0 (a)	Russia	4 / 4	Korbmacher, Van Waarden
1997 EC QS	Group Stage: Gr.2 (Class A)	1–1 (a), 1–2 (h)	France	4 / 4	Korbmacher, Migchelsen
1997 EC QS	Relegation Play-off	2–1 (a), 1–0 (h)	Czech Republic		Kiesel-Griffioen, Timisela, Wiegman
1999 WC QS	Group Stage: Gr.3 (Class A)	1–6 (a), 0–0 (h)	Norway	3 / 4	Roos
1999 WC QS	Group Stage: Gr.3 (Class A)	0–1 (a), 2–1 (h)	England	3 / 4	Noom (2)
1999 WC QS	Group Stage: Gr.3 (Class A)	1–0 (h), 1–2 (a)	Germany	3 / 4	Migchelsen, Noom
2001 EC QS	Group Stage: Gr.1 (Class A)	1–1 (h), 1–2 (a)	France	4 / 4	Van Eyk, Smith
2001 EC QS	Group Stage: Gr.1 (Class A)	1–1 (a), 1–2 (h)	Spain	4 / 4	Kiesel-Griffioen, Smith
2001 EC QS	Group Stage: Gr.1 (Class A)	1–1 (a), 0–3 (h)	Sweden	4 / 4	Smith
2001 EC QS	Relegation Play-Off	3–0 (a), 2–0 (h)	Hungary		Kiesel-Griffioen, Muller, Noom, Torny (2)
2003 WC QS	Group Stage: Gr.4 (Class A)	0–0 (a), 1–4 (h)	England	3 / 4	Kiesel-Griffioen
2003 WC QS	Group Stage: Gr.4 (Class A)	0–3 (h), 0–6 (a)	Germany	3 / 4	
2003 WC QS	Group Stage: Gr.4 (Class A)	1–2 (a), 4–1 (h)	Portugal	3 / 4	Burger, Muller, Noom, Ran, Smith
2005 EC QS	Group Stage: Gr.2 (Class A)	0–1 (h), 0–0 (a)	Spain	4 / 5	
2005 EC QS	Group Stage: Gr.2 (Class A)	0–2 (a), 0–2 (h)	Norway	4 / 5	
2005 EC QS	Group Stage: Gr.2 (Class A)	0–3 (a), 1–5 (h)	Denmark	4 / 5	Ran
2005 EC QS	Group Stage: Gr.2 (Class A)	3–0 (h), 3–0 (a)	Belgium	4 / 5	De Boer, Koster, Melis, Muller, Torny, Van Veen
2007 WC QS	Group Stage: Gr.5 (Class A)	1–0 (a), 0–2 (h)	France	3 / 5	De Boer
2007 WC QS	Group Stage: Gr.5 (Class A)	1–0 (a), 4–0 (h)	Austria	3 / 5	Delies, Demarteau, Louwaars, Smit (2)
2007 WC QS	Group Stage: Gr.5 (Class A)	0–1 (h), 0–4 (a)	England	3 / 5	
2007 WC QS	Group Stage: Gr.5 (Class A)	5–0 (a), 4–0 (h)	Hungary	3 / 5	Delies, Hoogendijk, Louwaars (2), Smit, Smith, Stevens (3)
2009 EC QS	Group Stage: Gr.4	1–5 (a), 0–1 (h)	Germany	2 / 5	Torny
2009 EC QS	Group Stage: Gr.4	2–2 (a), 1–1 (h)	Switzerland	2 / 5	Van Eijk, Melis (2)
2009 EC QS	Group Stage: Gr.4	2–1 (h), 1–0 (a)	Wales	2 / 5	Melis (2), Smit
2009 EC QS	Group Stage: Gr.4	2–2 (a), 3–0 (h)	Belgium	2 / 5	Hoogendijk, Melis (3), Stevens
2009 EC QS	Play-Off	2–0 (a), 2–0 (h)	Spain		Stevens (3), Van de Ven
(Finland) 2009 EC	Group Stage: Gr.A	2–0	Ukraine	2 / 4	Stevens, Van de Ven
(Finland) 2009 EC	Group Stage: Gr.A	1–2	Finland	2 / 4	Van de Ven
(Finland) 2009 EC	Group Stage: Gr.A	2–1	Denmark	2 / 4	Melis, Smit
(Finland) 2009 EC	Quarter-final	0–0 (a.e.t.) (5–4 p)	France		
(Finland) 2009 EC	Semi-final	1–2 (a.e.t.)	England		Pieëte
2011 WC QS	Group Stage: Gr.2	0–3 (a), 2–2 (h)	Norway	2 / 5	Dekker, Melis
2011 WC QS	Group Stage: Gr.2	13–1 (h), 7–0 (a)	(North Macedonia) Macedonia	2 / 5	Hoogendijk, Kiesel-Griffioen (4), Koster, Melis (2), Meulen, Pieëte, De Ridder, Slegers, Smit (7), Spitse
2011 WC QS	Group Stage: Gr.2	1–1 (h), 4–0 (a)	Belarus	2 / 5	Melis (2), De Ridder, Slegers, Van de Ven
2011 WC QS	Group Stage: Gr.2	2–0 (h), 1–0 (a)	Slovakia	2 / 5	Kiesel-Griffioen, Koster, Smit
2013 EC QS	Group Stage: Gr.6	6–0 (h), 4–0 (a)	Serbia	2 / 5	Van den Berg, Van de Donk, Hoogendijk, Martens, Melis (6)
2013 EC QS	Group Stage: Gr.6	3–0 (a), 2–0 (h)	Croatia	2 / 5	Melis, De Ridder, Smit, Spitse, Van de Ven
2013 EC QS	Group Stage: Gr.6	0–0 (h), 0–1 (a)	England	2 / 5	
2013 EC QS	Group Stage: Gr.6	2–0 (a), 3–1 (h)	Slovenia	2 / 5	Heuver, Melis, De Ridder, Van de Ven (2)
(Sweden) 2013 EC	Group Stage: Gr.B	0–0	Germany	4 / 4	
(Sweden) 2013 EC	Group Stage: Gr.B	0–1	Norway	4 / 4	
(Sweden) 2013 EC	Group Stage: Gr.B	0–1	Iceland	4 / 4	
2015 WC QS	Group Stage: Gr.5	4–0 (a), 10–1 (h)	Albania	2 / 6	Bakker, Van den Heiligenberg, Martens (2), Melis (3), Slegers (6), + 1 o.g.
2015 WC QS	Group Stage: Gr.5	7–0 (a), 3–2 (h)	Portugal	2 / 6	Van den Berg, Dekker, Miedema (6), Slegers (2)
2015 WC QS	Group Stage: Gr.5	1–2 (h), 2–0 (a)	Norway	2 / 6	Dekker, Van de Donk, Miedema
2015 WC QS	Group Stage: Gr.5	7–0 (h), 6–0 (a)	Greece	2 / 6	Bakker, Van den Berg (2), Martens (2), Melis (2), Middag, Miedema (4), Spitse
2015 WC QS	Group Stage: Gr.5	1–1 (h), 2–0 (a)	Belgium	2 / 6	Miedema (2), Slegers
2015 WC QS	Play-Off Semifinal	2–1 (a), 2–0 (h)	Scotland		Martens (2), Melis (2)
2015 WC QS	Play-Off; Final	1–1 (h), 2–1 (a)	Italy		Miedema (3)
(Canada) 2015 WC	Group Stage: Gr.A	1–0	New Zealand	3 / 4	Martens
(Canada) 2015 WC	Group Stage: Gr.A	0–1	China	3 / 4	
(Canada) 2015 WC	Group Stage: Gr.A	1–1	Canada	3 / 4	Van de Ven
(Canada) 2015 WC	Round of 16	1–2	Japan		Van de Ven
2016 OG QS	Single Round-robin	4–3	Switzerland	2 / 4	Van den Berg, Melis, Miedema, Van de Sanden
2016 OG QS	Single Round-robin	1–4	Norway	2 / 4	Melis
2016 OG QS	Single Round-robin	1–1	Sweden	2 / 4	Miedema
(Netherlands) 2017 EC	Group Stage: Gr.A	1–0	Norway	1 / 4	Van de Sanden
(Netherlands) 2017 EC	Group Stage: Gr.A	1–0	Denmark	1 / 4	Spitse
(Netherlands) 2017 EC	Group Stage: Gr.A	2–1	Belgium	1 / 4	Martens, Spitse
(Netherlands) 2017 EC	Quarter-final	2–0	Sweden		Martens, Miedema
(Netherlands) 2017 EC	Semi-final	3–0	England		Van de Donk, Miedema, + 1 o.g.
(Netherlands) 2017 EC	Final	4–2	Denmark		Martens, Miedema (2), Spitse
2019 WC QS	Group Stage: Gr.3	1–0 (h), 1–2 (a)	Norway	2 / 5	Miedema (2)
2019 WC QS	Group Stage: Gr.3	5–0 (a), 1–0 (h)	Slovakia	2 / 5	Van der Gragt (2), Martens, Miedema (2), Spitse
2019 WC QS	Group Stage: Gr.3	0–0 (h), 2–0 (a)	(Republic of Ireland) Ireland	2 / 5	Beerensteyn, Spitse
2019 WC QS	Group Stage: Gr.3	7–0 (h), 5–0 (a)	Northern Ireland	2 / 5	Beerensteyn, Van de Donk, Groenen, Martens (2), Miedema, Van de Sanden (2), Spitse (3), + 1 o.g.
2019 WC QS	Play-Off Semi-final	2–0 (h), 2–1 (a)	Denmark		Beerensteyn (3), Van de Sanden
2019 WC QS	Play-Off Final	3–0 (h), 1–1 (a)	Switzerland		Martens, Miedema (2), Spitse
(France) 2019 WC	Group Stage: Gr.E	1–0	New Zealand	1 / 4	Roord
(France) 2019 WC	Group Stage: Gr.E	3–1	Cameroon	1 / 4	D. Janssen, Miedema (2)
(France) 2019 WC	Group Stage: Gr.E	2–1	Canada	1 / 4	Beerensteyn, Dekker,
(France) 2019 WC	Round of 16	2–1	Japan		Martens (2)
(France) 2019 WC	Quarter-final	2–0	Italy		Van der Gragt, Miedema
(France) 2019 WC	Semi-final	1–0 (a.e.t.)	Sweden		Groenen
(France) 2019 WC	Final	0–2	(United States) USA		
(Japan) 2020 OG	Group Stage: Gr.F	10–3	Zambia	1 / 4	Beerensteyn, Martens (2), Miedema (4), Pelova, Roord, Van de Sanden
(Japan) 2020 OG	Group Stage: Gr.F	3–3	Brazil	1 / 4	D. Janssen, Miedema (2)
(Japan) 2020 OG	Group Stage: Gr.F	8–2	China	1 / 4	Beerensteyn (2), Martens (2), Miedema (2), Pelova, Van de Sanden
(Japan) 2020 OG	Quarter-final	2–2 (a.e.t.) (2–4 p)	(United States) USA		Miedema (2)
2022 EC QS	Group Stage: Gr.A	3–0 (h), 8–0 (a)	Turkey	1 / 6	Van de Donk (4), Van der Gragt, Miedema (2), Van de Sanden, Spitse (3),
2022 EC QS	Group Stage: Gr.A	4–1 (h), 4–2 (a)	Slovenia	1 / 6	Beerensteyn, Miedema (3), Spitse (4),
2022 EC QS	Group Stage: Gr.A	7–0 (h), 7–0 (a)	Estonia	1 / 6	Bloodworth, Van de Donk (2), Groenen (2), E. Jansen, Miedema (2), Nouwen, Roord, Snoeijs, Spitse (3),
2022 EC QS	Group Stage: Gr.A	2–0 (h), 1–0 (a)	Russia	1 / 6	Van de Donk, Miedema, Roord
2022 EC QS	Group Stage: Gr.A	6–0 (h), 6–0 (a)	Kosovo	1 / 6	Van de Donk, Martens (2), Miedema, Roord (2), Snoeijs (6)
(England) 2022EC	Group Stage: Gr.C	1–1	Sweden	2 / 4	Roord
(England) 2022EC	Group Stage: Gr.C	3–2	Portugal	2 / 4	Van de Donk, Egurrola, Van der Gragt
(England) 2022EC	Group Stage: Gr.C	4–1	Switzerland	2 / 4	Leuchter (2), Pelova, + 1 o.g.
(England) 2022EC	Quarter-final	0–1 (a.e.t.)	France		
2023 WC QS	Group Stage: Gr.C	1–0 (h), 2–0 (a)	Iceland	1 / 5	Brugts, Van de Donk, Groenen
2023 WC QS	Group Stage: Gr.C	3–0 (h), 2–0 (a)	Belarus	1 / 5	Beerensteyn, Van de Donk, Martens, Nouwen, Roord
2023 WC QS	Group Stage: Gr.C	12–0 (h), 8–0 (a)	Cyprus	1 / 5	Beerensteyn, Brugts, Van Dongen, Van de Donk, Miedema (7), Roord (6), Smits, Spitse, + 1 o.g.
2023 WC QS	Group Stage: Gr.C	1–1 (h), 2–2 (a)	Czech Republic	1 / 5	Van de Donk, Van der Gragt, Miedema
(Australia) (New Zealand) 2023 WC	Group Stage: Gr.E	1–0	Portugal	1 / 4	Van der Gragt
(Australia) (New Zealand) 2023 WC	Group Stage: Gr.E	1–1	(United States) USA	1 / 4	Roord
(Australia) (New Zealand) 2023 WC	Group Stage: Gr.E	7–0	Vietnam	1 / 4	Brugts (2), Van de Donk, Martens, Roord (2), Snoeijs
(Australia) (New Zealand) 2023 WC	Round of 16	2–0	South Africa		Beerensteyn, Roord
(Australia) (New Zealand) 2023 WC	Quarter-final	1–2 (a.e.t.)	Spain		Van der Gragt
2024 NL	Group Stage: Gr.A	1–2 (a), 4–0 (h)	Belgium	1 / 4	Beerensteyn (2), Egurrola (2), Roord
2024 NL	Group Stage: Gr.A	2–1 (h), 2–3 (a)	England	1 / 4	Beerensteyn (2), Jansen, Martens
2024 NL	Group Stage: Gr.A	4–0 (h), 1–0 (a)	Scotland	1 / 4	Beerensteyn (2), Brugts (2), Van de Donk
2024 NL	Semi-final	0–3	Spain		
2024 NL	Third-place play-off	0–2	Germany		
2025 EC QS	Group Stage: Gr.A1	1–0 (h), 1–1 (a)	Finland	2 / 4	Beerensteyn (2)
2025 EC QS	Group Stage: Gr.A1	1–0 (h), 1–1 (a)	Norway	2 / 4	Beerensteyn, Miedema
2025 EC QS	Group Stage: Gr.A1	0–2 (a), 0–0 (h)	Italy	2 / 4	
(Switzerland) 2025EC	Group Stage: Gr.D	3–0	Wales	3 / 4	Brugts, Miedema, Pelova,
(Switzerland) 2025EC	Group Stage: Gr.D	0–4	England	3 / 4	
(Switzerland) 2025EC	Group Stage: Gr.D	2–5	France	3 / 4	Pelova, + 1 o.g.
2025 NL	Group Stage: Gr.A1	2–2 (h)	Germany	? / 4	Beerensteyn (2)
2025 NL	Group Stage: Gr.A1	2–1 (a)	Scotland	? / 4	Beerensteyn, Grant
2025 NL	Group Stage: Gr.A1		Austria	? / 4	

note:a=Scotland withdrew during the 1989 qualification, their played results were voided.

=== Head-to-head record ===
Opponent	P	W	D	L	GF	GA	GD
Albania	2	2	0	0	14	1	+13
Australia	8	3	2	3	16	9	+7
Austria	6	5	0	1	15	2	+13
Belarus	6	5	1	0	24	3	+21
Belgium	33	23	5	5	93	31	+62
Brazil	7	0	4	3	8	11	−3
Cameroon	1	1	0	0	3	1	+2
Canada	14	1	4	9	9	23	−14
Chile	1	1	0	0	7	0	+7
China	14	3	5	6	19	18	+1
(Commonwealth of Independent States) CIS	4	4	0	0	8	1	+7
Costa Rica	1	1	0	0	4	0	+4
Croatia	2	2	0	0	5	0	+5
Cyprus	2	2	0	0	20	0	+20
Czech Republic	5	2	2	1	6	6	0
Denmark	26	11	5	10	27	37	−10
England	21	4	4	13	15	31	−16
Estonia	3	3	0	0	21	0	+21
Finland	12	5	4	3	12	10	+2
France	32	12	7	13	36	45	−9
Germany	17	3	2	12	10	41	−31
Greece	6	6	0	0	24	0	+24
Hungary	4	4	0	0	14	0	+14
Iceland	12	4	2	6	12	12	0
(Republic of Ireland) Ireland	9	6	3	0	16	1	+15
Israel	1	1	0	0	12	0	+12
Italy	19	4	6	9	16	30	−14
Ivory Coast	1	1	0	0	3	0	+3
Japan	10	4	1	5	17	16	+1
Kosovo	2	2	0	0	12	0	+12
(North Macedonia) Macedonia	2	2	0	0	20	1	+19
Mexico	3	3	0	0	7	2	+5
New Zealand	7	4	2	1	11	6	+5
Nigeria	7	4	3	0	18	7	+11
North Korea	3	1	2	0	3	1	+2
Northern Ireland	4	4	0	0	27	0	+27
Norway	27	7	6	14	25	44	−19
Poland	3	2	0	1	6	2	+4
Portugal	9	8	0	1	24	9	+15
Romania	3	1	2	0	8	2	+6
Russia	8	6	1	1	16	3	+13
Scotland	19	14	1	4	48	17	+31
Serbia	2	2	0	0	10	0	+10
Slovakia	4	4	0	0	9	0	+9
Slovenia	4	4	0	0	13	4	+9
South Africa	9	9	0	0	24	5	+19
Spain	11	2	3	6	7	11	−4
Sweden	23	7	6	10	19	34	−15
Switzerland	25	17	6	2	69	21	+48
Thailand	1	1	0	0	7	0	+7
Turkey	2	2	0	0	11	0	+11
Ukraine	1	1	0	0	2	0	+2
(United States) USA	12	2	2	8	12	33	−21
Vietnam	1	1	0	0	7	0	+7
Wales	5	5	0	0	12	1	+11
Zambia	1	1	0	0	10	3	+7
Total	477	239	91	147	923	535	388

updated till end WC '23

== Honours ==
=== Major competitions ===
- FIFA Women's World Cup
  - Runners-up (1): 2019
- UEFA Women's Championship
  - Champions (1): 2017

== FIFA world rankings ==
As of 6 March 2025

2003				2004				2005				2006				2007				2008				2009				2010			
16	16	15	15	15	15	16	17	17	17	18	17	17	17	18	18	18	18	18	18	18	20	20	17	17	17	15	17	16	16	15	15
2011				2012				2013				2014				2015				2016				2017				2018			
14	13	13	14	14	14	14	14	14	14	14	14	14	14	15	11	12	12	12	12	13	13	12	12	12	12	7	7	9	10	7	8
2019				2020				2021				2022					2023				2024				2025				2026		
3	3	3	3	4	4	4	4	3	4	4	5	5	4	6	8	8	8	9	7	7	8	11	11	10	10	11					

== See also ==
- Sport in the Netherlands
  - Football in the Netherlands
    - Women's football in the Netherlands
- Netherlands women's national under-19 football team
- Netherlands women's national under-17 football team
- Netherlands men's national football team
