= Ria Vestjens =

Dutch footballer (born 1959)

Personal information
- Date of birth: 12 April 1959 (age 67)
- Place of birth: Leveroy, Limburg, Netherlands
- Position: Midfielder

International career
| Years | Team | Apps | (Gls) |
| 1978–1991 | Netherlands | 64 | (13) |

Ria Vestjens (born 12 April 1959) is a Dutch former footballer who played as a midfielder. She was born in Leveroy, in the province of Limburg in the Netherlands. Vestjens made sixty-four appearances for the Netherlands from 1978 to 1991, in which she scored 13 goals.
