= Frans de Kat =

Dutch footballer and coach

Personal information
- Date of birth: 16 March 1965 (age 61)
- Place of birth: Assen, Netherlands

Senior career*
Years	Team	Apps	(Gls)
- VV VKW
- SC Heerenveen
- SC REMO
- SVV Scheveningen

Managerial career
- 2001–2004: Netherlands (women)
- 2004–2008: ADO Den Haag (Head of Academy)
- 2008–2010: Willem II (Head of scouting and youth development)
- 2010–2012: ROC ID College
- 2012–2014: Move Into Balance
- 2014–2016: Arsenal (Under 18 Manager)
- 2016–2017: KNVB (Coordinator of soccer training)
- * Club domestic league appearances and goals

Frans de Kat (born 1965) is a Dutch former footballer and coach who is the head of the Dutch national footballing academy.

== Playing career ==
De Kat firstly played as a professional footballer for SC Heerenveen. He later featured for clubs SC REMO and SVV Scheveningen.

== Coaching career ==
After ending his playing career, De Kat moved toward coaching, with him earning a CIOS-diploma in Heerenveen and studying at The Hague's Academy of Physical Education. He thereafter became a district coach with the KNVB. De Kat was appointed in 2001 as the manager of the Netherlands women's national team. Two years later he attained his UEFA Pro professional football coaching license. In 2004, he was replaced as the Dutch Women's football manager by Vera Pauw. Altogether he was at the helm of the side for a sum of 27 games.

He then took up the post of Assistant Manager at ADO Den Haag. De Kat eventually moved on to Willem II where he was named as the club's Head of Scouting and a consultant to their Academy. In March 2010 he coached the Willem II women's team until the end of that season. In July 2010 De Kat was appointed as the technical consultant at club RKDEO, a post which he held for another 18 months .

On 1 July 2014, De Kat linked up with London club Arsenal F.C. in the role of the Under18's manager.
