= Loes Camper =

Dutch footballer (born 1958)

Personal information
- Date of birth: 31 July 1958 (age 68)
- Position: Defender

International career
Years	Team	Apps	(Gls)
1978-1990	Netherlands	39	(8)

Loes Camper (born 31 July 1958) is a Dutch former footballer who played as a defender for TSV Siegen.

== Honours ==
TSV Siegen

- Frauen-Bundesliga: 1990–91, 1991–92, 1993–94
- German Cup: 1992–93
