= Nathalie Geeris =

Dutch footballer (born 1971)

Personal information
- Date of birth: 20 December 1971 (age 54)
- Place of birth: Haarlem, Netherlands
- Height: 1.70 m (5 ft 7 in)
- Positions: Midfielder; forward

Youth career
- HFC Spaarnestad

College career
Years	Team	Apps	(Gls)
1993–1995	Franklin Pierce Ravens		

Senior career*
Years	Team	Apps	(Gls)
–1993	Ter Leede		
1996–1997	Suzuyo Shimizu Lovely Ladies		
1998	Öxabäcks IF		
1999	Landvetters IF		
2000	Boston Renegades	14	(9)
- IF Böljan

International career^{‡}
1989–2000	Netherlands	30	(12)
- * Club domestic league appearances and goals as of 23:07, 15 November 2018 (UTC) ‡ National team caps and goals as of 23:07, 15 November 2018 (UTC)

Nathalie Geeris (born 20 December 1971) is a Dutch retired football midfielder or forward. She played for clubs in the Netherlands, Japan, the United States and Sweden, as well as for the Netherlands women's national football team.

== Club career ==
After beginning her football career with local minnows HFC Spaarnestad, Geeris transferred to top division Ter Leede to secure her national team place. At 21 years old she moved to America and participated in college soccer for the Franklin Pierce Ravens. In 1996, Geeris secured a contract with Suzuyo Shimizu Lovely Ladies, a professional club in the Japanese L. League.

In 2000 Geeris was back in America, playing for Boston Renegades of the USL W-League. She scored nine goals in 14 appearances. She was in evidence at a pre-draft combine prior to the 2000 WUSA Draft, but was not selected. As a veteran Geeris enjoyed a prolific spell in the Swedish lower divisions with IF Böljan.

== International career ==
On 11 April 1989, 17-year-old Geeris debuted for the senior Netherlands women's national football team, playing in a 1–1 draw with Norway in Denekamp. In April 1992 she scored both goals in the Netherlands' 2–1 win over Sweden, which brought her to the attention of Franklin Pierce Ravens coach Mark Krikorian who swooped with a scholarship offer.

== Personal life ==
During her playing career Geeris was in a relationship with Anneli Andelén.
