= Remy Reynierse =

Dutch association football player and assistant manager at Blackburn Rovers

Personal information
- Full name: Remy Reynierse
- Date of birth: 18 June 1961 (age 65)
- Place of birth: Rhenen, Netherlands
- Height: 1.80 m (5 ft 11 in)
- Position: Attacking midfielder

Senior career*
Years	Team	Apps	(Gls)
1979–1984	EVV Eindhoven	124	(15)
1984–1990	FC VVV	188	(30)
Total		312	(45)

Managerial career
- 1994–1995: VVV
- 2004: Netherlands Women (interim)
- 2020–2021: Malmö FF (assistant)
- 2022–2024: Blackburn Rovers (assistant)
- 2024–2025: Sweden (assistant)
- * Club domestic league appearances and goals

Remy Reynierse (also written as Remy Reijnierse; born 18 June 1961), is a Dutch football manager and former player. As a player, he served EVV Eindhoven (now known as FC Eindhoven) and FC VVV (now known as VVV-Venlo). As a manager, he has coached VVV, the Netherlands women's national football team and several other representative teams of the Royal Dutch Football Association.

== Playing career ==
Reynierse was born in Rhenen and started playing football as an attacking midfielder with Eerste Divisie club EVV Eindhoven in 1979. After making 124 league appearances, he moved to fellow Eerste Divisie side FC VVV in 1984. During the 1984–85 season, he helped the club achieve promotion to the Eredivisie. Reynierse saw VVV avoid relegation during the 1985–86 season, and they subsequently accomplished two consecutive fifth-place finishes during the 1986–87 and 1987–88 seasons. During this time, he played alongside future Dutch international Stan Valckx. However, they were relegated at the end of the 1988–89 season. After one more Eerste Divisie season, Reynierse retired from professional football in 1990, having made 188 league appearances for VVV and 312 in total.

== Managerial career ==
In 1986, Reynierse started his managerial career with VVV, even before he had retired as a player. After his retirement, he became head of academy. In 1994, he became head coach at the request of the board, who were looking to replace outgoing manager Frans Körver. After one season, he returned to his former post as head of the academy. In 1998, he moved to PSV Eindhoven to fulfill the same role, which he eventually did for three years.

In 2001, Reynierse signed with the Royal Dutch Football Association, where he would become the manager of several national youth teams. In 2004, he coached the Netherlands women's national football team on an interim basis for a total of four games. As assistant of Netherlands national under-21 football team head coach Foppe de Haan, Reynierse helped Jong Oranje to win the 2006 and 2007 UEFA European Under-21 Championships and to reach the quarter-finals at the 2008 Summer Olympics. Aside from managing national youth teams, Reynierse also worked as youth scout and as developer of the youth academies of Dutch professional football clubs.

On 1 June 2016, VfB Stuttgart announced that Reynierse and Olaf Janßen would become the assistants of new head coach Jos Luhukay, starting from 1 July. However, on 15 September, Luhukay parted ways with Stuttgart on mutual agreement, and Reynierse was also released from the club.

On 8 January 2018, he joined Sheffield Wednesday to become assistant to new manager Jos Luhukay.

On 13 January 2020, he joined Malmö FF to become assistant manager to Jon Dahl Tomasson.

On 14 June 2022, he joined Blackburn Rovers to become assistant manager to Jon Dahl Tomasson once again.
