= Melween N'Dongala =

French footballer (born 2004)

Personal information
- Date of birth: 6 September 2004 (age 22)
- Place of birth: Argenteuil, France
- Height: 1.66 m (5 ft 5 in)
- Position: Right-back

Team information
- Current team: Paris FC
- Number: 18

Youth career
- 2015–2019: ES Marly-la-Ville
- 2019–2022: Paris FC

Senior career*
Years	Team	Apps	(Gls)
2022–	Paris FC	49	(1)

International career^{‡}
2020	France U16	3	(0)
2022	France U19	6	(1)
2022–2024	France U20	4	(0)
2024–	France U23	4	(0)
2025–	France	13	(0)
Medal record
Women's football
Representing France
UEFA Women's Nations League
Third place	2025
- * Club domestic league appearances and goals as of 3 October 2026 ‡ National team caps and goals as of 10 October 2026

Melween N'Dongala (born 6 September 2004) is a French professional footballer who plays as a right-back for Première Ligue club Paris FC and the France national team.

== Club career ==
N'Dongala began her career at ES Marly-la-Ville, before joining Paris FC's academy team when she was 15 years old.

After debuting for the first team in 2022, N'Dongala signed a professional contract with Paris FC in 2023 for one year. In 2024, N'Dongala extended this contract until 2026.

== International career ==
N'Dongala was part of France's 23-player squad for the UEFA Women's Euro 2025 in Switzerland.

== Career statistics ==
=== International ===
As of match played 10 October 2026

Appearances and goals by national team and year
National team	Year	Apps	Goals
France	2025	7	0
France	2026	6	0
Total		13	0

== Honours ==
Paris FC

- Coupe de France Féminine: 2024–25

Individual

- UNFP Première Ligue team of the season: 2025–26
- LFFP Première Ligue team of the season: 2025–26
