= Wil de Visser =

Former Dutch footballer

Personal information
- Date of birth: 4 July 1952 (age 74)
- Place of birth: Delft, Netherlands
- Position: Forward

Senior career*
Years	Team	Apps	(Gls)
1973-1990	KFC '71		

International career
1972-1984	Netherlands	30	(12)
- * Club domestic league appearances and goals

Wil de Visser (born 4 July 1952) is a former Dutch footballer who played for KFC '71.

== Honours ==
While playing with KFC '71, de Visser played in the Landskampioen (1985–86, 1988–89) and Dutch Cup (1986–87, 1989–90).

== Personal life ==
De Visser is one of eleven children.
