= Jan Derks =

Dutch football manager (1939–2016)

Personal information
- Date of birth: 2 March 1950 (age 76)
- Place of birth: Zutphen, Netherlands

Managerial career
- Years: Team
- 1989–1991: Netherlands Women (assistant manager)
- 1991–1995: Netherlands Women

Jan Derks is a Dutch professional football coach who enjoyed two spells in charge of the Netherlands women's national football team. Derks was briefly in charge of youth development at the Scottish team Rangers.
