= Bert van Lingen =

Dutch football coach (born 1945)

Personal information
- Full name: Lubertus Hendricus van Lingen
- Date of birth: 28 December 1945 (age 80)
- Place of birth: Delft, Netherlands

Senior career*
Years	Team	Apps	(Gls)
- DSV Concordia
- DHC Delft

Managerial career
- 1971: De Graafschap
- 1979–1986: Netherlands Women
- 1989–1991: Netherlands Women
- * Club domestic league appearances and goals

Lubertus Hendricus "Bert" van Lingen (28 December 1945) is a Dutch professional football coach who enjoyed two spells in charge of the Netherlands women's national football team.

He later became an acolyte of Dick Advocaat, accompanying the self-styled 'Little General' on lucrative assignments at Glasgow Rangers, Zenit Saint Petersburg and Sunderland.

Van Lingen is married to Vera Pauw, a former player in his charge some 17 years his junior, who herself went on to coach the Netherlands women's team as well.
