= Andries Jonker =

Dutch footballer and manager

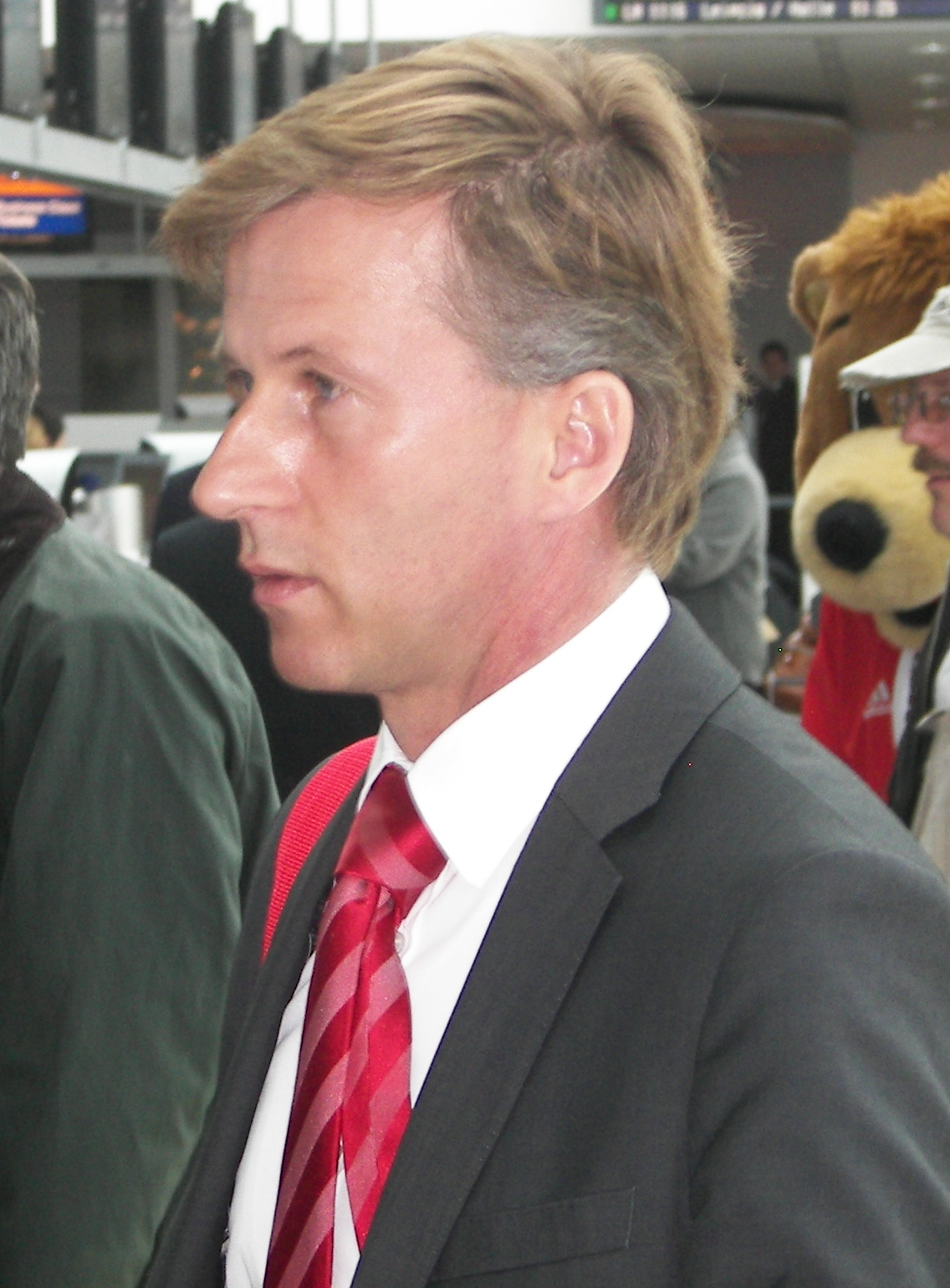
- Jonker in 2010

Personal information
- Full name: Andries Jonker
- Date of birth: 22 September 1962 (age 64)
- Place of birth: Amsterdam, Netherlands
- Height: 1.78 m (5 ft 10 in)

Team information
- Current team: MVV (head coach)

Youth career
- Volendam

Senior career*
Years	Team	Apps	(Gls)
- De Volewijckers
–1980	Volendam		
1980–	De Volewijckers		
- De Meer
–1988	ZFC		

Managerial career
- 1988–1990: DRC Amsterdam II
- 1999–2000: Volendam
- 2001: Netherlands (women) (interim)
- 2002–2003: Barcelona (assistant)
- 2004–2006: MVV
- 2007–2009: Willem II
- 2009–2011: Bayern Munich (assistant)
- 2011: Bayern Munich (caretaker)
- 2011–2012: Bayern Munich II
- 2012–2013: VfL Wolfsburg (assistant)
- 2017: VfL Wolfsburg
- 2019–2022: Telstar
- 2022–2025: Netherlands (women)
- 2026–: MVV
- * Club domestic league appearances and goals

Andries Jonker (Note: The phrase Andries Jonker is pronounced [ˈɑndri ˈɕɔŋkər]. The words in isolation are pronounced [ˈɑndris] and [ˈjɔŋkər].) (22 September 1962) is a Dutch professional football manager and former player. Jonker is currently the head coach of MVV.

Jonker was at the helm of Dutch outfits Willem II, MVV and Volendam and was the assistant manager of VfL Wolfsburg, Barcelona and Bayern Munich as well. From 2014 to February 2017, he took up the role as head of the Arsenal Academy, after which he returned to Wolfsburg to become the first-team manager.

== Playing career ==
Jonker as a player featured in Holland for clubs, Volendam, De Volewijckers, De Meer and ZFC.

== Managerial career ==
=== Jong Oranje ===
Jonker began his career managing at side DRC Amsterdam II in 1988. Two years afterward, he attained the post at the helm of the Netherlands's youth teams. He eventually held on to this role for seven years altogether.

=== Volendam ===
The head managerial post at Volendam was taken up by Jonker in July 1999. Jonker was in this role at the Kras Stadion until late June of the following year.

=== MVV ===
In July 2004, Jonker was appointed as the manager of club MVV. As such, he saw the Sterrendragers get to the quarter-finals of the 2006 KNVB Cup.

=== Willem II ===
Jonker was named as an assistant manager at Willem II for the 2006–07 season. The following season saw him fully take up the helm of the Tricolores. Jonker stayed on as manager of the club for another season, only to leave the side in February 2009.

=== Bayern Munich ===
Jonker then joined Bayern Munich as an assistant to Louis van Gaal in July 2009. In this role, Jonker won with Bayern the double of the Bundesliga and the DFB-Pokal in 2010. He then took over the side in April 2011 on an interim basis until the end of that season. In June 2011, Jonker was announced as the new manager of Bayern Munich II. Jonker eventually left the club altogether in June 2012.

=== VfL Wolfsburg ===
Jonker joined up with VfL Wolfsburg soon afterward, thus staying in the Bundesliga. At the Volkswagen Arena, he took up the position of an assistant manager, where he helped see the Wolves get to the DFB-Pokal semi-finals in 2013.

=== Arsenal ===
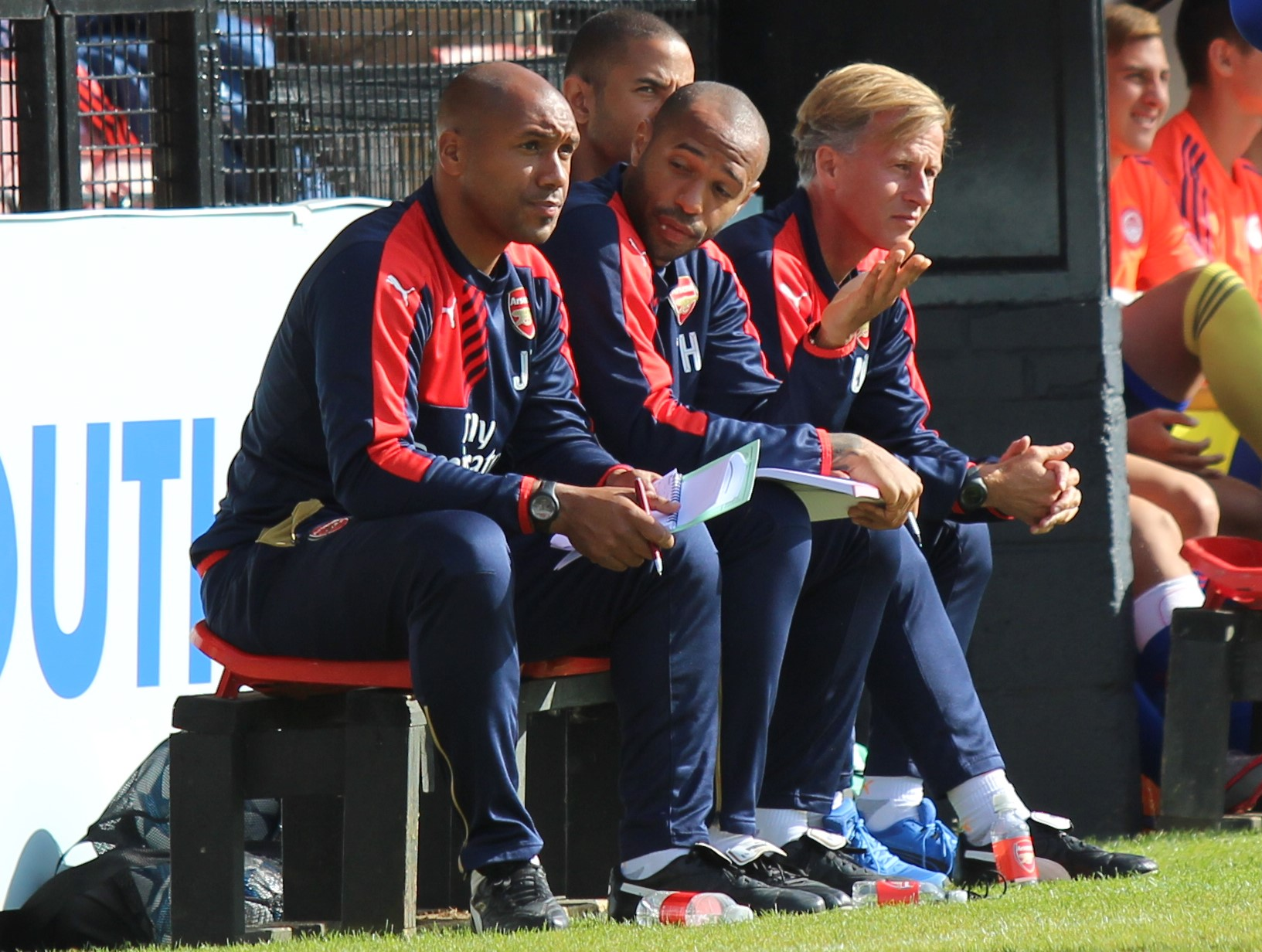
Jonker with fellow coaches Thierry Henry and Jason Brown at Arsenal, 2015

Jonker was announced as the new academy manager at English club Arsenal ahead of the 2014–15 season. Whilst at the club, Jonker was an influential and key part in the academy's Hale End based facility being redesigned and rebuilt.

=== Return to Wolfsburg ===
Jonker again linked up with Wolfsburg so as to be appointed as the club's new first-team manager in February 2017. Jonker and Wolfsburg parted ways on 18 September 2017.

=== Telstar ===
Exactly seven years after his first appointment as assistant coach at VfL Wolfsburg, Jonker signed a two-year contract with Eerste Divisie club Telstar. At the club from Velsen-Zuid, Jonker was appointed as head coach and technical director, succeeding Mike Snoei and Piet Buter, who left for De Graafschap.

In June 2022, Jonker parted ways with Telstar.

=== Netherlands Women ===
On 24 August 2022, Jonker was appointed as the new Netherlands women's national team boss, replacing Mark Parsons, who was sacked after the team's poor performance at Euro 2022. Jonker left this role in 2025.

=== Return to MVV ===
Jonker returned to MVV as the headcoach as of 1 June 2026. He has led MVV to 4 victories in their first 4 games.

== Managerial statistics ==
As of 28 August 2026

Team	From	To	Record							
Team	From	To	G	W	D	L	GF	GA	GD	Win%
Volendam	1 July 1999	30 June 2000	39	10	8	21	35	44	−9	25.64
Netherlands Women	6 March 2001	9 October 2001	8	5	1	2	22	9	+13	62.50
MVV	1 July 2003	30 June 2006	118	33	34	51	142	181	−39	27.97
Willem II	5 November 2007	17 February 2009	49	15	8	26	63	73	−10	30.61
Bayern Munich	10 April 2011	9 June 2011	5	4	1	0	20	5	+15	80.00
Bayern Munich II	9 June 2011	30 June 2012	34	8	10	16	43	54	−11	23.53
VfL Wolfsburg	27 February 2017	18 September 2017	19	8	4	7	19	24	−5	42.11
Telstar	28 June 2019	20 June 2022	91	28	27	36	137	160	−23	30.77
Netherlands Women	24 August 2022	13 July 2025	42	22	6	14	75	49	+26	52.38
MVV	1 June 2026	Present	4	4	0	0	8	4	+4	100.00
Career totals			409	137	99	173	564	604	−40	33.50
