= Vera Pauw =

Dutch football coach and former player (born 1963)

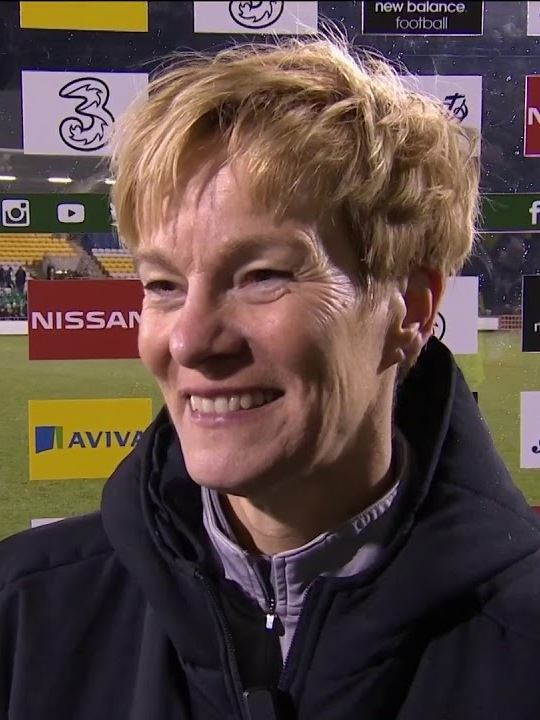
- Pauw in 2020

Personal information
- Date of birth: 18 January 1963 (age 63)
- Place of birth: Amsterdam, Netherlands
- Position: Defender

Senior career*
| Years | Team | Apps | (Gls) |
| 1976–1981 | VV Brederodes | | |
| 1981–1988 | VSV Vreeswijk | | |
| 1988–1990 | Modena | | |
| 1990–19?? | Puck Deventer | | |
- SV Saestum

International career
| 1984–1998 | Netherlands | 89 | (2) |

Managerial career
- 1998–2004: Scotland
- 2004–2010: Netherlands
- 2011: Russia
- 2014–2016: South Africa
- 2018: Houston Dash
- 2019–2023: Republic of Ireland
- 2025–: United Arab Emirates
- * Club domestic league appearances and goals

Vera Pauw (Dutch pronunciation: [ˈveːraː ˈpʌu]; born 18 January 1963) is a Dutch football coach and former player who is the manager of the United Arab Emirates women's national team. She has managed several national women's football teams, including Ireland, Scotland, Netherlands, Russia and South Africa.

== Playing career ==
As a child, Pauw played football with her two brothers on the streets. When she was 13 years old SV Bredorodes started a women's team which Pauw joined, and at the age of 18 she moved to VSV Vreeswijk to play at a higher level. Soon she arrived at the Netherlands women's national football team and from 1983 to 1998 played 89 international matches, but never qualified for the final tournament of a World Cup or European Championship. She did become the first female Dutch player to play professionally outside the country, when she signed for Italian Serie A club Modena in 1988. After two years in Italy, she returned to the Netherlands and played for Puck Deventer and SV Saestum.

== Coaching career ==
In September 1998, Pauw was appointed coach and technical director of Scotland, at the same time her husband Bert van Lingen was working as assistant manager of Glasgow Rangers. She departed in October 2004 to take up a similar role with the Netherlands and led her home country to the semi-final of UEFA Women's Euro 2009. She was controversially fired in the first half of 2010.

In April 2011, she succeeded Igor Shalimov as coach of Russia on an interim basis. In September 2011 she was replaced by Farid Benstiti. After that she was appointed as a technical director of Russian team.

In March 2014, she became the South Africa coach, replacing Joseph Mkhonza who became a selector for the national team. She said at the time "I am excited to become part of this ambitious project in which we can develop our girls into international stars. SAFA is aiming high with women’s football." Pauw explained that she had previously had a great deal of involvement with the South Africa setup due to the frequency of friendlies with the Dutch while she was managing them.

She resigned as South Africa head coach after leading the nation to the 2016 Olympics. On 27 November 2017 Pauw was hired as the new head coach of the Houston Dash. On 20 September 2018 Pauw departed from the National Women's Soccer League club.

On 4 September 2019, Pauw was appointed as the new manager of the Ireland team. Despite Ireland's narrow failure to achieve a play-off position from UEFA Women's Euro 2022 qualifying Group I, Pauw agreed a two-year contract extension in February 2021. She then made up a historic milestone after the narrow missing of the Women's Euro 2022, guiding the Irish team to the first-ever major tournament, the 2023 FIFA Women's World Cup, with a 1–0 playoff win over Scotland. At the 2023 World Cup, the Republic of Ireland faced Australia, Canada and Nigeria, suffering narrow defeats to the former two and gaining their first World Cup point with a 0-0 against the latter.

On 29 August 2023, Pauw's management of the Republic of Ireland team was brought to an end as it was announced that the Football Association of Ireland would not be offering her a new contract on expiry of her current deal.

== Personal life ==
Pauw is married to her former national team coach Bert van Lingen.

=== Rape allegations ===
In July 2022, Pauw accused an unnamed Dutch FA director and later football manager of sexually abusing her during her playing career. Former coach Piet Buter then declared he assumed he was the subject of her accusation and denied all allegations except for having an affair with her at the time. The KNVB (Dutch football association) stated that it had made errors handling Pauw's complaints and was sorry that she had not had a safe working environment.

=== Misconduct scandal ===
In December 2022, Pauw was named in a report by the US National Women's Soccer League that discovered widespread ongoing misconduct in the league. The report claimed that during her time in charge of Houston Dash, Pauw attempted to exert excessive control over her players' and staff's diet, weight, fitness, training, housing, and location. Pauw denied any wrongdoing. Pauw is banned from working in the NWSL unless she accepts personal responsibility.

== Career statistics ==
Scores and results list the Netherlands goal tally first.

| Goal | Date | Venue | Opponent | Score | Result | Competition |
|---|---|---|---|---|---|---|
| 1. | 19 March 1990 | Solitude, Belfast, Northern Ireland | Northern Ireland | 3–0 | 6–0 | 1991 UEFA Women's Euro qualification |
| 2. | 16 March 1995 | Estádio José Arcanjo, Olhão, Portugal | Sweden | 1–1 | 1–2 | 1995 Algarve Cup |

== Honours ==
Individual

- Rinus Michels Lifetime Achievement Award (Rinus Michels Oeuvreprijs): 2024
