= Piet Buter =

Dutch football manager

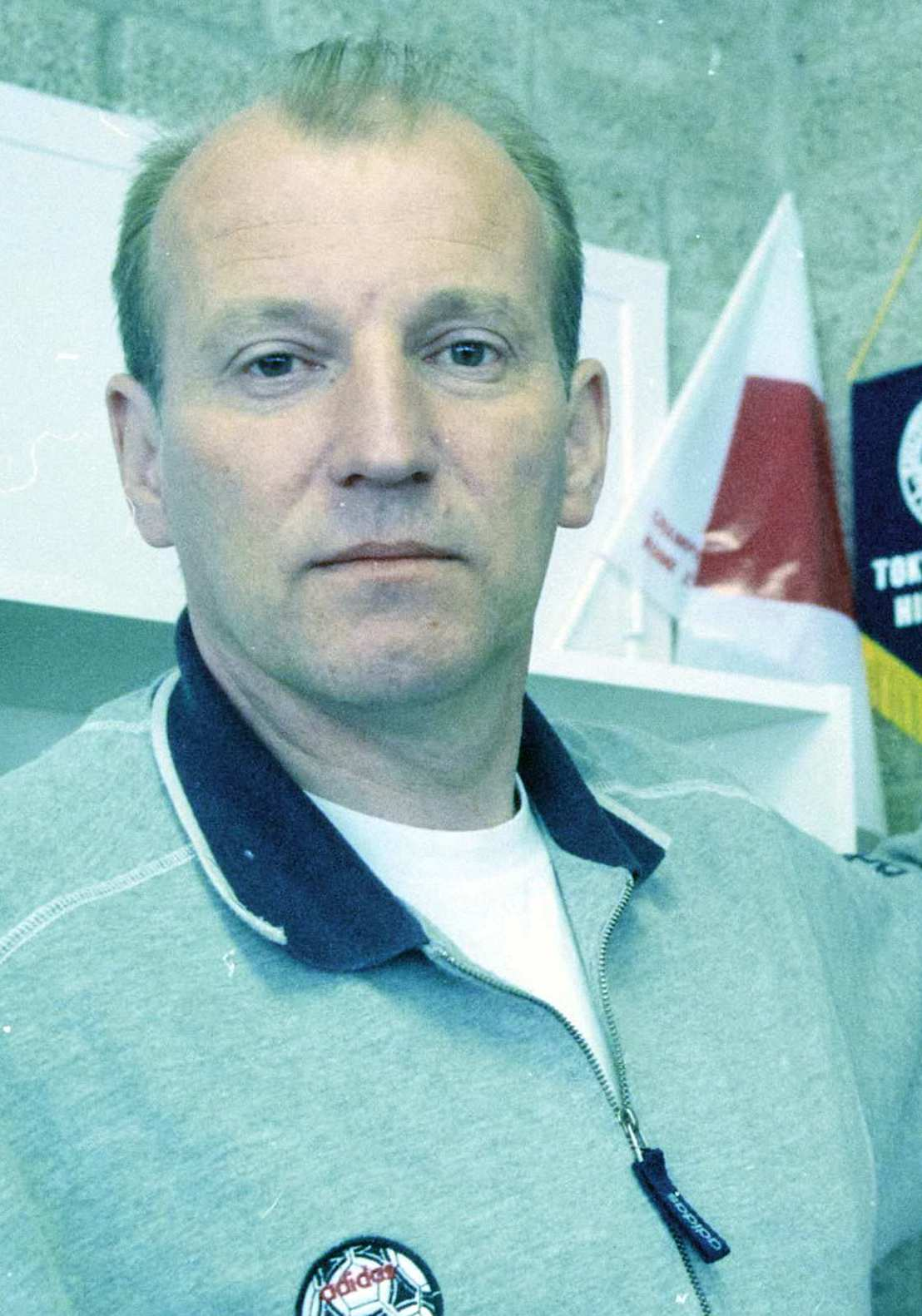
- Buter in 1997

Personal information
- Date of birth: 6 June 1949 (age 77)
- Place of birth: Haarlem, Netherlands

Managerial career
- Years: Team
- 1987–1989: Netherlands women
- 1989–1991: FC Wageningen
- 1991–1992: FC Emmen
- 1992–1993: FC Eindhoven
- 2006–2009: FC Utrecht (technical director)
- 2009–2011: Iran (assistant coach)

Piet Buter (Dutch pronunciation: [pid ˈbytər]; born 6 June 1949) is a soccer coach from Haarlem, Netherlands. After a number of coaching positions and a spell as technical director of FC Utrecht, he was assistant coach to the Iran national football team.

== Life and early career ==
Piet Buter was born in Haarlem, Netherlands, and in his younger years played amateur soccer for VV Schoten. An injury cut short his playing career, and he turned to coaching instead.

Buter began his coaching career with SV Cronje, and subsequently had spells at VV Noordwijk and RCH. He spent a period under contract with the Dutch Football Association.

== Professional career ==
From 1989 to 1991, Buter was coach of Dutch first division club FC Wageningen, and in successive seasons took the club to 10th and 15th positions in the league. In his second season with Wageningen he shared his duties with Willem van Hanegem (who went on to coach FC Utrecht), as his assistant coach.

In 1991 Buter moved to FC Emmen. But he only managed an eighteenth-place finish, and was replaced by René Notten. Buter then moved on to FC Eindhoven for one season.

In 1993, he took a break from his coaching career, but returned in 2006 to take on the role of Technical Director at FC Utrecht, where he stayed until 2009.

In 2009, Buter left Utrecht and took the job of assistant coach with the Iran national football team.

== Controversies ==
In March 2008, the Dutch FA stated there were no connections between FC Utrecht and player agency Grandstand. Buter had been involved with the company and since he was technical director at Utrecht at the time, there were accusations of a conflict of interest.

In July 2022, former Dutch footballer and manager Vera Pauw accused an unnamed Dutch FA director and later football manager of sexually assaulting her during her playing career. Buter then declared he assumed her to accuse him and denied all allegations except for having an affair with her at the time.
