= Ruud Dokter =

Dutch football manager

Ruud Dokter (born 27 June 1955 in Makkinga) is a Dutch football manager and former footballer who is a JIRA Panel Member/Technical Instructor for UEFA.

== Playing career ==
As a player, Dokter played in the Dutch amateur leagues.

== Managerial career ==
In 2013, Dokter was appointed high performance director of the Football Association of Ireland. His remit was reported to include the non-senior men's international programme. After that, he worked as JIRA Panel Member/Technical Instructor for UEFA.
