= 2018 UEFA Women's Under-17 Championship squads =

The following is a list of squads for each national team competing at the 2018 UEFA Women's Under-17 Championship in Lithuania. Each national team had to submit a squad of 20 players born on or after 1 January 2001.

== Group A ==
=== Lithuania ===
Lithuania named their squad on 1 May 2018.

Head coach: Ieva Kibirkštis

No.	Pos.	Player	Date of birth (age)	Club
3	DF	Gintarė Blažytė	8 January 2001 (aged 17)	(Lithuanian Football Federation) MFA Žalgiris Vilnius
4	DF	Alina Špakovskaja	11 September 2003 (aged 14)	(Lithuanian Football Federation) Vilniaus FM
7	MF	Sylvia Šafranovič	29 August 2001 (aged 16)	(Lithuanian Football Federation) MFA Žalgiris Vilnius
8	DF	Eva Jakaitė	5 March 2002 (aged 16)	(Lithuanian Football Federation) Kauno Žalgiris
9	FW	Erika Šupelytė	28 July 2003 (aged 14)	(Lithuanian Football Federation) MFA Žalgiris Vilnius
10	MF	Gabija Toropovaitė	28 January 2002 (aged 16)	(Lithuanian Football Federation) Šiaulių FA
11	DF	Milita Ragauskaitė	27 August 2002 (aged 15)	(Lithuanian Football Federation) Jonava
12	GK	Monika Bačkieriūtė	23 May 2002 (aged 15)	(Lithuanian Football Federation) Marijampolė
13	DF	Greta Markauskaitė	4 April 2002 (aged 16)	(Lithuanian Football Federation) Jonava
14	MF	Ugnė Lazdauskaitė	9 October 2002 (aged 15)	(Lithuanian Football Federation) MFA Žalgiris Vilnius
15	MF	Dorotėja Aidukaitė	15 May 2002 (aged 15)	(Lithuanian Football Federation) MFA Žalgiris Vilnius
16	MF	Marija Galkina	12 September 2002 (aged 15)	(Lithuanian Football Federation) Panevėžio FA
17	DF	Laura Ubartaitė	7 August 2002 (aged 15)	(Lithuanian Football Federation) Banga
18	MF	Judita Sabatauskaitė	23 May 2002 (aged 15)	(Lithuanian Football Federation) Jonava
19	MF	Saulė Jonynaitė	5 May 2002 (aged 16)	(Lithuanian Football Federation) MFA Žalgiris Vilnius
20	MF	Gabrielė Ragauskaitė	11 August 2001 (aged 16)	(Lithuanian Football Federation) Jonava
21	FW	Karilė Liužinaitė	10 September 2002 (aged 15)	(Lithuanian Football Federation) Panevėžio FA
22	GK	Meda Šeškutė	1 August 2003 (aged 14)	(Lithuanian Football Federation) Vilniaus FM
23	MF	Loreta Rogačiova	19 March 2001 (aged 17)	(Lithuanian Football Federation) Vilniaus FM
24	FW	Dovilė Dockaitė	12 December 2003 (aged 14)	(Lithuanian Football Federation) FK Šešupė

=== Germany ===
Germany named their squad on 19 April 2018.

Head coach: Anouschka Bernhard

No.	Pos.	Player	Date of birth (age)	Club
1	GK	Wiebke Willebrandt	16 January 2001 (aged 17)	(German Football Association) TuS Lipperode
2	DF	Laura Donhauser	4 September 2001 (aged 16)	(German Football Association) FC Amberg
3	DF	Julia Pollak	9 May 2002 (aged 16)	(German Football Association) Bayern Munich
4	DF	Emilie Bernhardt	5 May 2002 (aged 16)	(German Football Association) DJK Ingolstadt
5	DF	Greta Stegemann	12 February 2001 (aged 17)	(German Football Association) SC Freiburg
6	DF	Anna Aehling	23 March 2001 (aged 17)	(German Football Association) FSV Gütersloh
7	MF	Gia Corley	20 May 2002 (aged 15)	(German Football Association) JFG Wendelstein
8	MF	Leonie Köster	6 April 2001 (aged 17)	(German Football Association) Bayern Munich
9	FW	Shekiera Martinez	4 July 2001 (aged 16)	(German Football Association) FFC Frankfurt
10	FW	Ivana Fuso	12 March 2001 (aged 17)	(German Football Association) SC Freiburg
11	MF	Vanessa Fudalla	21 October 2001 (aged 16)	(German Football Association) Bayern Munich
12	GK	Maria Luisa Grohs	13 June 2001 (aged 16)	(German Football Association) 1. FC Gievenbeck
13	DF	Charlotte Blümel	8 December 2001 (aged 16)	(German Football Association) FSV Gütersloh
14	DF	Madeleine Steck	31 January 2002 (aged 16)	(German Football Association) VfL Sindelfingen
15	DF	Lina Jubel	26 January 2001 (aged 17)	(German Football Association) Neubrandenburg
16	DF	Michelle Weiß	27 May 2001 (aged 16)	(German Football Association) SV Alberweiler
18	MF	Miray Cin	5 July 2001 (aged 16)	(German Football Association) SGS Essen
19	MF	Pauline Berning	9 January 2001 (aged 17)	(German Football Association) FSV Gütersloh
20	FW	Nora Clausen	8 February 2001 (aged 17)	(German Football Association) Werder Bremen
22	MF	Sophie Weidauer	10 February 2002 (aged 16)	(German Football Association) Turbine Potsdam

=== Finland ===
Finland named their squad on 3 May 2018.

Head coach: Marko Saloranta

No.	Pos.	Player	Date of birth (age)	Club
1	GK	Emma Immonen	1 May 2001 (aged 17)	(Football Association of Finland) PK-35 Vantaa
2	DF	Joanna Tynnilä	1 September 2001 (aged 16)	(Football Association of Finland) TiPS
3	DF	Jenna Topra	17 June 2001 (aged 16)	(Football Association of Finland) TiPS
4	DF	Kaisa Juvonen	7 January 2001 (aged 17)	(Football Association of Finland) Ilves
5	DF	Ella Pesonen	22 July 2001 (aged 16)	(Football Association of Finland) HJK
6	DF	Nana Yang	1 October 2001 (aged 16)	(Football Association of Finland) Honka
8	MF	Oona Siren	23 February 2001 (aged 17)	(Football Association of Finland) TiPS
9	MF	Emma Varmanen	19 March 2001 (aged 17)	(Football Association of Finland) HJK
10	MF	Tuuli Enkkilä	18 June 2001 (aged 16)	(Football Association of Finland) Ilves
11	FW	Jenni Kantanen	12 August 2001 (aged 16)	(Football Association of Finland) Ilves
12	GK	Anna Koivunen	6 November 2001 (aged 16)	(Football Association of Finland) TPS
13	DF	Emmi Siren	23 February 2001 (aged 17)	(Football Association of Finland) TiPS
14	FW	Aino Vuorinen	18 December 2001 (aged 16)	(Football Association of Finland) Honka
15	MF	Annika Huhta	29 January 2002 (aged 16)	(Football Association of Finland) HJK
16	MF	Alma Forstén	7 June 2001 (aged 16)	(Football Association of Finland) Jyväskylän Pallokerho
17	MF	Vilma Koivisto	21 November 2002 (aged 15)	(Swedish Football Association) Piteå IF
18	MF	Katariina Kosola	24 February 2001 (aged 17)	(Football Association of Finland) Hämeenlinnan Jalkapalloseura
19	MF	Heta Olmala	29 December 2001 (aged 16)	(Football Association of Finland) Oulu Nice Soccer
20	FW	Dana Leskinen	22 September 2001 (aged 16)	(German Football Association) TSG Hoffenheim
21	MF	Eerika Appelqvist	4 June 2001 (aged 16)	(Football Association of Finland) Honka

=== Netherlands ===
Netherlands named their squad on 3 May 2018.

Head coach: Marleen Wissink

No.	Pos.	Player	Date of birth (age)	Club
1	GK	Claire Dinkla	22 June 2002 (aged 15)	(Royal Dutch Football Association) CTO Amsterdam
2	DF	Lieske Carleer	16 April 2001 (aged 17)	(Royal Dutch Football Association) CTO Eindhoven
3	DF	Gwyneth Hendriks	4 March 2001 (aged 17)	(Royal Dutch Football Association) CTO Amsterdam
4	DF	Samantha van Diemen	28 January 2002 (aged 16)	(Royal Dutch Football Association) CTO Amsterdam
5	DF	Lotte Jansen	2 June 2001 (aged 16)	(Royal Dutch Football Association) CTO Eindhoven
6	MF	Jonna van de Velde	4 November 2001 (aged 16)	(Royal Dutch Football Association) CTO Amsterdam
7	FW	Chasity Grant	19 April 2001 (aged 17)	(Royal Dutch Football Association) ADO Den Haag
8	DF	Dana Foederer	27 July 2002 (aged 15)	(Royal Dutch Football Association) CTO Eindhoven
9	FW	Romée Leuchter	12 January 2001 (aged 17)	(Royal Dutch Football Association) CTO Eindhoven
10	MF	Kirsten van de Westeringh	6 June 2001 (aged 16)	(Royal Dutch Football Association) CTO Amsterdam
11	MF	Nikita Tromp	8 May 2002 (aged 16)	(Royal Dutch Football Association) CTO Amsterdam
12	DF	Julia Kagie	8 January 2001 (aged 17)	(Royal Dutch Football Association) ADO Den Haag
13	MF	Roos van der Veen	30 October 2001 (aged 16)	(Royal Dutch Football Association) CTO Eindhoven
14	DF	Moisa van Koot	9 June 2001 (aged 16)	(Royal Dutch Football Association) PEC Zwolle
15	MF	Danique van Ginkel	25 April 2001 (aged 17)	(Royal Dutch Football Association) SV Saestum
16	GK	Lois Niënhuis	4 February 2001 (aged 17)	(Royal Dutch Football Association) Longa '30
17	FW	Isa Van Eester	7 March 2001 (aged 17)	(Royal Dutch Football Association) VV Baronie
18	FW	Ella Peddemors	6 August 2002 (aged 15)	(Royal Dutch Football Association) Sparta Enschede
19	FW	Lakeesha Eijken	7 July 2001 (aged 16)	(Royal Dutch Football Association) CTO Amsterdam
20	FW	Pascalle Pomper	13 May 2001 (aged 16)	(German Football Association) SV Meppen

== Group B ==
=== Poland ===
Poland named their squad on 19 April 2018.

Head coach: Nina Patalon

No.	Pos.	Player	Date of birth (age)	Club
1	GK	Marta Kaźmierczak	28 November 2002 (aged 15)	(Polish Football Association) Bielawianka Bielawa
2	DF	Anna Konkol	8 January 2002 (aged 16)	(Polish Football Association) ROW Rybnik
3	FW	Agnieszka Glinka	8 July 2002 (aged 15)	(Polish Football Association) SMS Łódź
4	MF	Paulina Oleksiak	4 July 2002 (aged 15)	(Polish Football Association) SMS Łódź
5	DF	Oliwia Silny	16 July 2002 (aged 15)	(Polish Football Association) Bielawianka Bielawa
6	DF	Zuzanna Radochońska	11 November 2002 (aged 15)	(Polish Football Association) Sztorm AWFiS Gdańsk
7	FW	Paulina Tomasiak	2 January 2002 (aged 16)	(Polish Football Association) Staszkówka Jelna
8	DF	Wiktoria Zieniewicz	9 May 2002 (aged 16)	(Polish Football Association) SMS Łódź
9	FW	Kinga Kozak	15 October 2002 (aged 15)	(Polish Football Association) Medyk Konin
10	MF	Paulina Filipczak	5 July 2001 (aged 16)	(Polish Football Association) SMS Łódź
11	MF	Adriana Achcińska	22 April 2002 (aged 16)	(Polish Football Association) Miedź Legnica
12	GK	Sara Kierul	23 June 2002 (aged 15)	(German Football Association) Blau-Weiß Hohen Neuendorf
13	MF	Wiktoria Kiszkis	14 June 2003 (aged 14)	(The Football Association) Arsenal
14	MF	Michelle Biskup	24 January 2002 (aged 16)	(German Football Association) FC Köln
15	DF	Oliwia Cichy	18 September 2001 (aged 16)	(Polish Football Association) Czarni Sosnowiec
16	DF	Alicja Sokołowska	26 October 2002 (aged 15)	(Polish Football Association) SMS Łódź
17	DF	Zofia Buszewska	5 April 2002 (aged 16)	(Polish Football Association) Medyk Konin
18	FW	Klaudia Homa	18 January 2002 (aged 16)	(Polish Football Association) AZS Wrocław
19	MF	Natalia Padilla	6 November 2002 (aged 15)	(Royal Spanish Football Federation) Málaga
20	MF	Alexis Legowski	20 September 2001 (aged 16)	(United States Soccer Federation) FC Stars

=== Spain ===
Spain named their squad on 30 April 2018.

Head coach: Toña Is

No.	Pos.	Player	Date of birth (age)	Club
1	GK	Paula Suárez	6 August 2001 (aged 16)	(Royal Spanish Football Federation) Sporting Gijón
2	DF	Iria Castro	2 January 2002 (aged 16)	(Royal Spanish Football Federation) Nuestra Señora de Belén
3	MF	Ana Tejada	2 June 2002 (aged 15)	(Royal Spanish Football Federation) EdF Logroño
4	DF	Teresa Mérida	17 July 2002 (aged 15)	(Royal Spanish Football Federation) Jerez Industrial
5	DF	Jana Fernández	18 February 2002 (aged 16)	(Royal Spanish Football Federation) Barcelona C
6	MF	Irene López	26 September 2001 (aged 16)	(Royal Spanish Football Federation) Madrid CFF
7	MF	Paola Hernández	25 July 2002 (aged 15)	(Royal Spanish Football Federation) Tenerife Egatesa
8	MF	Aida Esteve	12 March 2001 (aged 17)	(Royal Spanish Football Federation) Barcelona B
9	DF	Mabel Okoye	30 July 2001 (aged 16)	(Royal Spanish Football Federation) Madrid CFF
11	FW	Bruna Vilamala	4 June 2002 (aged 15)	(Royal Spanish Football Federation) Barcelona C
12	MF	Leire Peña	20 June 2001 (aged 16)	(Royal Spanish Football Federation) Madrid CFF
13	GK	Catalina Coll	23 April 2001 (aged 17)	(Royal Spanish Football Federation) UD Collerense
14	FW	Isabel Pala	25 November 2002 (aged 15)	(Royal Spanish Football Federation) Madrid CFF
15	DF	Naroa Uriarte	5 February 2001 (aged 17)	(Royal Spanish Football Federation) Athletic Club
16	FW	Paula Arana	8 November 2001 (aged 16)	(Royal Spanish Football Federation) Aurrerá de Vitoria
17	DF	María Méndez Fernández	10 April 2001 (aged 17)	(Royal Spanish Football Federation) Real Oviedo
18	FW	Eva Navarro	27 January 2001 (aged 17)	(Royal Spanish Football Federation) Plaza de Argel
19	FW	Salma Paralluelo	13 November 2003 (aged 14)	(Royal Spanish Football Federation) Zaragoza CFF
20	DF	Paula Tomás	11 September 2001 (aged 16)	(Royal Spanish Football Federation) Levante
21	FW	Aixa Salvador	12 October 2001 (aged 16)	(Royal Spanish Football Federation) Villarreal

=== Italy ===
Italy named their squad on 27 April 2018.

Head coach: Massimo Migliorini

No.	Pos.	Player	Date of birth (age)	Club
1	GK	Beatrice Beretta	1 July 2003 (aged 14)	(Italian Football Federation) Juventus
2	DF	Angela Orlando	4 May 2001 (aged 17)	(Italian Football Federation) Res Roma
3	DF	Paola Boglioni	28 June 2001 (aged 16)	(Italian Football Federation) Brescia
4	DF	Chiara Pucci	13 January 2002 (aged 16)	(German Football Association) Bayern Munich
5	MF	Chiara Mele	23 January 2002 (aged 16)	(Italian Football Federation) Fortitudo Mozzecane
6	MF	Benedetta De Biase	3 August 2001 (aged 16)	(Italian Football Federation) Napoli
7	DF	Elisa Donda	9 July 2000 (aged 17)	(Italian Football Federation) Tavagnacco
8	MF	Marta Morreale	29 August 2001 (aged 16)	(Italian Football Federation) Fiorentina
9	FW	Sara Tamborini	3 May 2001 (aged 17)	(Italian Football Federation) Azalee
10	MF	Melissa Bellucci	8 February 2001 (aged 17)	(Italian Football Federation) Jesina
11	FW	Asia Bragonzi	5 March 2001 (aged 17)	(Italian Football Federation) Internazionale
12	GK	Camilla Forcinella	22 June 2001 (aged 16)	(Italian Football Federation) AGSM Verona
13	FW	Maria Grazia Ladu	24 January 2001 (aged 17)	(Italian Football Federation) Sassari Torres
14	DF	Heden Corrado	5 March 2002 (aged 16)	(Italian Football Federation) Res Roma
15	DF	Chiara Ripamonti	31 March 2001 (aged 17)	(Italian Football Federation) Internazionale
16	MF	Emma Severini	18 July 2003 (aged 14)	(Italian Football Federation) Fiorentina
17	FW	Teresa Fracas	4 March 2001 (aged 17)	(Italian Football Federation) Ligorna
18	MF	Veronica Battelani	23 July 2002 (aged 15)	(Italian Football Federation) Riccione
19	MF	Martina Tomaselli	1 August 2001 (aged 16)	(Italian Football Federation) Brescia
20	FW	Serena Landa	29 March 2001 (aged 17)	(Italian Football Federation) Real Meda

=== England ===
England named their squad on 2 May 2018.

Head coach: John Griffiths

No.	Pos.	Player	Date of birth (age)	Club
1	GK	Kayla Rendell	29 June 2001 (aged 16)	(The Football Association) Southampton
2	DF	Emma Brown	16 October 2001 (aged 16)	(The Football Association) Teesside
3	DF	Phoebe Williams	23 March 2001 (aged 17)	(The Football Association) Southampton
4	MF	Katie Bradley	25 December 2001 (aged 16)	(The Football Association) Manchester City
5	MF	Lia Cataldo	11 February 2001 (aged 17)	(The Football Association) Arsenal
6	DF	Abbie Roberts	7 June 2001 (aged 16)	(The Football Association) Milton Keynes Dons
7	FW	Simran Jhamat	22 January 2001 (aged 17)	(The Football Association) Liverpool
8	MF	Ava Kuyken	15 June 2001 (aged 16)	(The Football Association) Arsenal
9	FW	Ebony Salmon	27 January 2001 (aged 17)	(The Football Association) Aston Villa
10	FW	Annabel Blanchard	7 May 2001 (aged 17)	(The Football Association) Liverpool
11	FW	Libby Smith	11 March 2001 (aged 17)	(The Football Association) Chelsea
12	DF	Asmita Ale	3 November 2001 (aged 16)	(The Football Association) Aston Villa
13	GK	Fran Stenson	27 April 2001 (aged 17)	(The Football Association) Birmingham City
14	MF	Paris McKenzie	1 January 2001 (aged 17)	(The Football Association) Birmingham City
15	DF	Lucy Roberts	11 May 2001 (aged 16)	(The Football Association) Liverpool
16	MF	Missy Bo Kearns	14 April 2001 (aged 17)	(The Football Association) Liverpool
17	FW	Paige Bailey-Gayle	12 November 2001 (aged 16)	(The Football Association) Arsenal
18	MF	Jess Park	21 October 2001 (aged 16)	(The Football Association) Manchester City
19	FW	Hannah Griffin	12 January 2001 (aged 17)	(German Football Association) Saarbrücken
20	FW	Jessica Wooley	27 March 2001 (aged 17)	(The Football Association) Bristol City
