= 2018 FIFA U-17 Women's World Cup squads =

Each country's final squad has to comprise 21 players. FIFA announced the squads on 5 November 2018.

== Group A ==
=== Uruguay ===
Head coach: Ariel Longo

No.	Pos.	Player	Date of birth (age)	Club
1	GK	Jennifer Sosa	17 November 2003 (aged 14)	(United States Soccer Federation) New York City FC
2	DF	Daniela Olivera	8 January 2001 (aged 17)	(Uruguayan Football Association) Liverpool
3	DF	Sofía Ramondegui	26 March 2001 (aged 17)	(Uruguayan Football Association) National Football Club Nueva
4	MF	Pilar González	26 June 2002 (aged 16)	(Uruguayan Football Association) SAC Canelones
5	MF	Deyna Morales	16 September 2001 (aged 17)	(Uruguayan Football Association) Rentistas
6	DF	Sharon López	1 May 2003 (aged 15)	(Uruguayan Football Association) Colón
7	FW	Ángela Gómez	10 August 2002 (aged 16)	(Uruguayan Football Association) Liverpool
8	MF	Sasha Larrea	29 August 2001 (aged 17)	(Uruguayan Football Association) Peñarol
9	MF	Cecilia Gòmez	7 September 2001 (aged 17)	(Uruguayan Football Association) Colón
10	MF	Valentina Morales	17 March 2001 (aged 17)	(Uruguayan Football Association) Peñarol
11	FW	Esperanza Pizarro	15 April 2001 (aged 17)	(Uruguayan Football Association) National Football Club Nueva
12	GK	Inailén Rodríguez	18 May 2002 (aged 16)	(Uruguayan Football Association) Rentistas
13	GK	Agustina Caraballo	14 December 2001 (aged 16)	(Uruguayan Football Association) Peñarol
14	DF	Antonella Ferradans	2 May 2001 (aged 17)	(Uruguayan Football Association) Progreso
15	MF	Karol Bermúdez	18 April 2001 (aged 17)	(Uruguayan Football Association) Liverpool
16	MF	Juliana Viera	8 May 2002 (aged 16)	(Uruguayan Football Association) Liverpool
17	FW	Solciré Pazos	30 September 2002 (aged 16)	(Uruguayan Football Association) Liverpool
18	MF	Nikol Laurnaga	1 March 2002 (aged 16)	(Uruguayan Football Association) Liverpool
19	DF	Micaela Domínguez	11 May 2001 (aged 17)	(Uruguayan Football Association) Liverpool
20	DF	Maytel Costa	11 February 2001 (aged 17)	(Uruguayan Football Association) Colón
21	FW	Belén Aquino	1 February 2002 (aged 16)	(Uruguayan Football Association) Colón

=== Ghana ===
Head coach: Evans Adotey

No.	Pos.	Player	Date of birth (age)	Club
1	GK	Grace Boadu	15 January 2002 (aged 16)	(Ghana Football Association) Halifax Ladies
2	FW	Alice Sarpong	7 June 2003 (aged 15)	(Ghana Football Association) Sea Lions Ladies
3	FW	Millot Pokuaa	10 October 2001 (aged 17)	(Ghana Football Association) Faith Ladies FC
4	DF	Justice Tweneboaa	28 October 2001 (aged 17)	(Ghana Football Association) Ampem Darkoa Ladies
5	DF	Elizabeth Oppong	15 May 2003 (aged 15)	(Ghana Football Association) Samaria Ladies
6	MF	Jacqueline Owusu	12 June 2002 (aged 16)	(Ghana Football Association) Dreamz Ladies
7	FW	Suzzy Teye	6 November 2002 (aged 16)	(Ghana Football Association) Lady Strikers
8	FW	Mukarama Abdulai	10 October 2002 (aged 16)	(Ghana Football Association) Northern Ladies
9	MF	Elshaddai Acheampong	16 August 2003 (aged 15)	(Ghana Football Association) Kumasi Sports Academy
10	MF	Fuseina Mumuni	2 April 2001 (aged 17)	(Ghana Football Association) Lepo Stars
11	FW	Abigail Tutuwaa	18 November 2002 (aged 15)	(Ghana Football Association) Prison Ladies
12	DF	Nina Norshie	14 September 2001 (aged 17)	(Ghana Football Association) Valued Girls
13	MF	Azumah Bugre	15 December 2002 (aged 15)	(Ghana Football Association) Police Ladies
14	DF	Mavis Owusu	7 December 2003 (aged 14)	(Ghana Football Association) Ampem Darkoa Ladies
15	DF	Selina Kurug	5 February 2001 (aged 17)	(Ghana Football Association) Prison Ladies
16	GK	Cynthia Konlan	29 November 2002 (aged 15)	(Ghana Football Association) Lepo Stars
17	DF	Tedinah Sekyere	7 June 2002 (aged 16)	(Ghana Football Association) Dreamz Ladies
18	DF	Faustina Aidoo	3 May 2001 (aged 17)	(Ghana Football Association) Halifax Ladies
19	MF	Animah Grace	4 September 2003 (aged 15)	(Ghana Football Association) Police Ladies
20	MF	Basira Alhassan	30 March 2003 (aged 15)	(Ghana Football Association) Lepo Stars
21	GK	Barikisu Issahaku	12 November 2001 (aged 17)	(Ghana Football Association) Real Upper

=== New Zealand ===
Head Coach: Leon Birnie

No.	Pos.	Player	Date of birth (age)	Club
1	GK	Anna Leat	26 June 2001 (aged 17)	(New Zealand Football) East Coast Bays AFC
2	DF	Mackenzie Barry	11 April 2001 (aged 17)	(New Zealand Football) Waimakariri United AFC
3	DF	Hannah Mackay-Wright	8 January 2001 (aged 17)	(New Zealand Football) Forrest Hill Milford
4	DF	Aneka Mittendorff	6 August 2001 (aged 17)	(New Zealand Football) Forrest Hill Milford
5	DF	Marisa van der Meer	27 March 2002 (aged 16)	(New Zealand Football) FC Twenty 11
6	MF	Macey Fraser	11 July 2002 (aged 16)	(New Zealand Football) Waimakariri United AFC
7	FW	Gabi Rennie	7 July 2001 (aged 17)	(New Zealand Football) Waimakariri United AFC
8	MF	Amelia Abbott	22 July 2001 (aged 17)	(New Zealand Football) Nelson Suburbs FC
9	MF	Maggie Jenkins	14 June 2001 (aged 17)	(New Zealand Football) Glenfield Rovers
10	FW	Grace Wisnewski	28 June 2002 (aged 16)	(New Zealand Football) Hamilton Wanderers AFC
11	FW	Kelli Brown	21 February 2001 (aged 17)	(New Zealand Football) Hamilton Wanderers AFC
12	MF	Jayda Stewart	8 March 2002 (aged 16)	(New Zealand Football) Waimakariri United AFC
13	FW	Britney Cunningham-Lee	4 March 2001 (aged 17)	(New Zealand Football) Papakura City FC
14	DF	Laney Strachan	12 December 2001 (aged 16)	(New Zealand Football) Glenfield Rovers
15	DF	Genevieve Ryan	28 May 2001 (aged 17)	(New Zealand Football) Western Springs AFC
16	MF	Maya Hahn	7 February 2001 (aged 17)	(New Zealand Football) Western Suburbs
17	FW	Ayla Pratt	15 February 2001 (aged 17)	(New Zealand Football) Three Kings United
18	MF	Rose Luxton	6 February 2001 (aged 17)	(New Zealand Football) Forrest Hill Milford
19	FW	Arabella Maynard	8 August 2001 (aged 17)	(New Zealand Football) Forrest Hill Milford
20	GK	Georgia Candy	29 April 2001 (aged 17)	(New Zealand Football) Hamilton Wanderers AFC
21	GK	Blair Currie	4 May 2001 (aged 17)	(New Zealand Football) Cashmere Technical

=== Finland ===
Head Coach: Marko Saloranta

No.	Pos.	Player	Date of birth (age)	Club
1	GK	Emma Immonen	1 May 2001 (aged 17)	(Football Association of Finland) PK-35 Vantaa
2	DF	Joanna Tynnilä	1 September 2001 (aged 17)	(Football Association of Finland) TiPS
3	FW	Jenna Topra	17 June 2001 (aged 17)	(Football Association of Finland) TiPS
4	DF	Kaisa Juvonen	7 January 2001 (aged 17)	(Football Association of Finland) Ilves
5	DF	Ella Pesonen	22 July 2001 (aged 17)	(Football Association of Finland) HJK
6	DF	Nana Yang	1 October 2001 (aged 17)	(Football Association of Finland) Honka
7	DF	Nea Silvola	4 November 2001 (aged 17)	(Football Association of Finland) HJK
8	MF	Oona Siren	23 February 2001 (aged 17)	(Football Association of Finland) TiPS
9	DF	Alisa Hokkanen	8 September 2001 (aged 17)	(Football Association of Finland) PK-35 Vantaa
10	MF	Tuuli Enkkilä	18 June 2001 (aged 17)	(Football Association of Finland) Ilves
11	FW	Jenni Kantanen	12 August 2001 (aged 17)	(Football Association of Finland) Ilves
12	GK	Anna Koivunen	6 November 2001 (aged 17)	(Football Association of Finland) TPS
13	DF	Emmi Siren	23 February 2001 (aged 17)	(Football Association of Finland) TiPS
14	FW	Aino Vuorinen	8 December 2001 (aged 16)	(Football Association of Finland) Honka
15	MF	Annika Huhta	29 January 2002 (aged 16)	(Football Association of Finland) HJK
16	MF	Julia Sainio	24 April 2001 (aged 17)	(Football Association of Finland) TPS
17	MF	Vilma Koivisto	21 November 2002 (aged 15)	(Swedish Football Association) Piteå IF
18	MF	Katariina Kosola	24 February 2001 (aged 17)	(Football Association of Finland) HJS
19	MF	Heta Olmala	29 December 2001 (aged 16)	(Football Association of Finland) ONS
20	FW	Dana Leskinen	22 September 2001 (aged 17)	(German Football Association) TSG Hoffenheim
21	GK	Fanny Söderström	15 November 2001 (aged 16)	(Football Association of Finland) Vasa IFK

== Group B ==
=== Mexico ===
Head Coach: Mónica Vergara

No.	Pos.	Player	Date of birth (age)	Club
1	GK	Jaidy Gutiérrez	24 October 2001 (aged 17)	(Mexican Football Federation) América
2	DF	Reyna Reyes	16 February 2001 (aged 17)	(United States Soccer Federation) FC Dallas
3	DF	Tanna Sánchez	21 December 2001 (aged 16)	(Mexican Football Federation) Tec Monterrey Puebla
4	DF	Karen Gómez	1 August 2001 (aged 17)	(Mexican Football Federation) Pachuca
5	DF	Ximena Ríos	26 July 2001 (aged 17)	(Mexican Football Federation) América
6	MF	Noemí Granados	30 September 2002 (aged 16)	(Mexican Football Federation) Veracruz
7	FW	Nayeli Díaz	10 October 2001 (aged 17)	(United States Soccer Federation) Arsenal
8	MF	Nicole Pérez	30 August 2001 (aged 17)	(Mexican Football Federation) Guadalajara
9	FW	Vanessa Buso	21 May 2001 (aged 17)	(United States Soccer Federation) Legends FC
10	FW	Alison González	31 January 2002 (aged 16)	(Mexican Football Federation) UANL
11	MF	Anette Vázquez	11 March 2002 (aged 16)	(Mexican Football Federation) Guadalajara
12	GK	Melany Villeda	25 October 2001 (aged 17)	(Mexican Football Federation) Pumas UNAM
13	DF	Fátima Arellano	12 May 2001 (aged 17)	(Mexican Football Federation) Pachuca
14	DF	Nicole Soto	8 July 2001 (aged 17)	(United States Soccer Federation) So Cal Blues
15	DF	Julieta Peralta	15 April 2002 (aged 16)	(Mexican Football Federation) América
16	DF	Felicia Escobar	9 May 2001 (aged 17)	(Swedish Football Association) Kopparbergs/Göteborg FC
17	FW	Natalia Mauleón	4 February 2002 (aged 16)	(Mexican Football Federation) Toluca
18	MF	Silvana Flores	18 April 2002 (aged 16)	(The Football Association) Arsenal
19	MF	Denise Castro	20 April 2003 (aged 15)	(United States Soccer Federation) Albion Hurricanes
20	GK	Azul Álvarez	24 March 2003 (aged 15)	Unattached
21	MF	Aylín Avilez	18 May 2003 (aged 15)	(Mexican Football Federation) Monterrey

=== South Africa ===
Head Coach: Simphiwe Dludlu

No.	Pos.	Player	Date of birth (age)	Club
1	GK	Kay-Dee Windvogel	7 February 2002 (aged 16)	(South African Football Association) High Performance Centre
2	DF	Yolanda Nduli	18 January 2002 (aged 16)	(South African Football Association) Durban Ladies
3	DF	Lonathemba Mhlongo	23 August 2002 (aged 16)	(South African Football Association) Soweto Ladies
4	DF	Yenzokuhle Ngubane	10 August 2002 (aged 16)	(South African Football Association) Durban Ladies
5	DF	Nkateko Nkhuna	30 September 2003 (aged 15)	(South African Football Association) Mamelodi Sundowns Ladies Academy
6	MF	Sibulele Holweni	28 April 2001 (aged 17)	(South African Football Association) Durban Ladies
7	MF	Khunjulwa Mali	10 July 2002 (aged 16)	(South African Football Association) Soweto Ladies
8	DF	Jessica Wade	11 April 2003 (aged 15)	(South African Football Association) JVW Girls
9	FW	Chelsea Daniels	8 April 2002 (aged 16)	(South African Football Association) University of the Western Cape
10	MF	Karabo Dhlamini	18 September 2001 (aged 17)	(South African Football Association) Mamelodi Sundowns Ladies Academy
11	MF	Zethembiso Vilakazi	16 February 2002 (aged 16)	(South African Football Association) Mamelodi Sundowns Ladies Academy
12	MF	Oratile Mokwena	21 March 2001 (aged 17)	(South African Football Association) Mamelodi Sundowns Ladies Academy
13	MF	Sphumelele Shamase	16 January 2002 (aged 16)	(South African Football Association) Durban Ladies
14	MF	Thubelihle Shamase	16 January 2002 (aged 16)	(South African Football Association) Durban Ladies
15	FW	Zikhona Nogqala	8 October 2001 (aged 17)	(South African Football Association) SuperSport United
16	GK	Leigh Brophy	25 November 2001 (aged 16)	(South African Football Association) Cape Town Roses
17	FW	Ember Edwards	6 January 2002 (aged 16)	(South African Football Association) Cape Town Roses
18	MF	Miche Minnies	14 November 2001 (aged 16)	(South African Football Association) Cape Town Spurs
19	MF	Serenity Warner	30 March 2002 (aged 16)	(South African Football Association) Santos
20	DF	Fikile Magama	19 January 2002 (aged 16)	(South African Football Association) High Performance Centre
21	GK	Mananki Makhoana	2 April 2002 (aged 16)	(South African Football Association) Mamelodi Sundowns Ladies Academy

=== Brazil ===
Head Coach: Luizão

No.	Pos.	Player	Date of birth (age)	Club
1	GK	Mayara	3 August 2001 (aged 17)	(Brazilian Football Confederation) Imperial-PR
2	DF	Bruninha	16 June 2002 (aged 16)	(Brazilian Football Confederation) Chapecoense
3	DF	Isa Haas	20 January 2001 (aged 17)	(Brazilian Football Confederation) Internacional
4	DF	Vitória Bruna	4 July 2001 (aged 17)	(Brazilian Football Confederation) São José
5	MF	Duda Batista	28 November 2002 (aged 15)	(Brazilian Football Confederation) São José
6	DF	Gisseli	27 July 2001 (aged 17)	(Brazilian Football Confederation) Chapecoense
7	DF	Belinha	23 July 2001 (aged 17)	(Brazilian Football Confederation) Chapecoense
8	MF	Vitória	23 January 2002 (aged 16)	(Brazilian Football Confederation) AD Centro Olímpico
9	FW	Jheniffer	6 November 2001 (aged 17)	(Brazilian Football Confederation) Grêmio Audax
10	FW	Amanda	18 March 2001 (aged 17)	(Brazilian Football Confederation) Santos FC
11	FW	Emily	22 February 2002 (aged 16)	(Brazilian Football Confederation) Chapecoense
12	GK	Marcelle	27 December 2002 (aged 15)	(Brazilian Football Confederation) AD Centro Olímpico
13	DF	Yasmin	24 July 2001 (aged 17)	(Brazilian Football Confederation) Chapecoense
14	DF	Lauren	13 September 2002 (aged 16)	(Brazilian Football Confederation) AD Centro Olímpico
15	MF	Cris	14 January 2002 (aged 16)	(Brazilian Football Confederation) AD Centro Olímpico
16	FW	Thai	21 February 2001 (aged 17)	(Brazilian Football Confederation) Ferroviária
17	FW	Júlia Beatriz	7 February 2001 (aged 17)	(Brazilian Football Confederation) Tiradentes
18	MF	Júlia	24 November 2001 (aged 16)	(Brazilian Football Confederation) Internacional
19	MF	Malu Schwaizer	20 March 2001 (aged 17)	(Brazilian Football Confederation) Santos FC
20	MF	Helena	4 February 2002 (aged 16)	(United States Soccer Federation) IMG Academy
21	GK	Lucilene	28 December 2002 (aged 15)	(Brazilian Football Confederation) Grêmio Audax

=== Japan ===
Head Coach: Futoshi Ikeda

No.	Pos.	Player	Date of birth (age)	Club
1	GK	Shu Ohba	11 July 2002 (aged 16)	(Japan Football Association) JFA Academy Fukushima LSC
2	DF	Chihiro Tomioka	15 August 2001 (aged 17)	(Japan Football Association) JFA Academy Fukushima LSC
3	DF	Ibuki Nagae	3 March 2002 (aged 16)	(Japan Football Association) JEF United Chiba Ladies
4	DF	Wakaba Goto	4 June 2001 (aged 17)	(Japan Football Association) NTV Menina
5	DF	Tamaki Okuma	25 December 2001 (aged 16)	(Japan Football Association) JEF United Chiba Ladies
6	MF	Sara Ito	11 November 2001 (aged 17)	(Japan Football Association) NTV Menina
7	DF	Shino Matsuda	27 March 2001 (aged 17)	(Japan Football Association) NTV Menina
8	MF	Chise Takizawa	14 February 2001 (aged 17)	(Japan Football Association) Jumonji High School
9	FW	Chiina Kamiya	19 March 2001 (aged 17)	(Japan Football Association) St. Capitanio High School
10	MF	Momo Nakao	9 March 2002 (aged 16)	(Japan Football Association) JEF United Chiba Ladies
11	FW	Tomoko Tanaka	16 July 2001 (aged 17)	(Japan Football Association) Cerezo Osaka Sakai Ladies
12	FW	Haruka Osawa	15 April 2001 (aged 17)	(Japan Football Association) JEF United Chiba Ladies
13	FW	Yuzuki Yamamoto	1 September 2002 (aged 16)	(Japan Football Association) NTV Menina
14	DF	Warai Yoshizumi	4 November 2002 (aged 16)	(Japan Football Association) Cerezo Osaka Sakai Ladies
15	MF	Akane Nishino	4 February 2002 (aged 16)	(Japan Football Association) JEF United Chiba Ladies
16	MF	Momoka Kinoshita	2 March 2003 (aged 15)	(Japan Football Association) NTV Menina
17	MF	Ran Iwai	29 March 2002 (aged 16)	(Japan Football Association) JFA Academy Fukushima LSC
18	GK	Shiori Fukuda	13 June 2002 (aged 16)	(Japan Football Association) Urawa Red Diamonds Ladies
19	MF	Misaki Morita	11 January 2002 (aged 16)	(Japan Football Association) Okayama Sakuyo High School
20	MF	Chihiro Ishida	20 December 2001 (aged 16)	(Japan Football Association) JFA Academy Fukushima LSC
21	GK	Yuria Ito	2 April 2001 (aged 17)	(Japan Football Association) JFA Academy Fukushima LSC

== Group C ==
=== United States ===
Head Coach: (England) Mark Carr

No.	Pos.	Player	Date of birth (age)	Club
1	GK	Angelina Anderson	22 March 2001 (aged 17)	(United States Soccer Federation) Mustang
2	DF	Makenna Morris	26 April 2002 (aged 16)	(United States Soccer Federation) Bethesda
3	DF	Talia DellaPeruta	19 April 2002 (aged 16)	(United States Soccer Federation) NTH Tophat
4	DF	Smith Hunter	4 January 2002 (aged 16)	(United States Soccer Federation) Seattle Reign FC
5	FW	Trinity Byars	29 January 2003 (aged 15)	(United States Soccer Federation) Solar SC
6	MF	Astrid Wheeler	20 August 2001 (aged 17)	(United States Soccer Federation) Atlanta Fire
7	FW	Samantha Meza	7 November 2001 (aged 17)	(United States Soccer Federation) Solar SC
8	MF	Maya Doms	11 May 2001 (aged 17)	(United States Soccer Federation) Davis Legacy
9	FW	Jordan Canniff	27 July 2001 (aged 17)	(United States Soccer Federation) Washington Spirit
10	MF	Mia Fishel	30 April 2001 (aged 17)	(United States Soccer Federation) San Diego Surf
11	FW	Trinity Rodman	20 May 2002 (aged 16)	(United States Soccer Federation) So Cal Blues
12	GK	Julia Dohle	6 February 2001 (aged 17)	(United States Soccer Federation) New York City
13	FW	Izzy D'Aquila	8 September 2001 (aged 17)	(United States Soccer Federation) So Cal Blues
14	MF	Hannah Bebar	5 September 2001 (aged 17)	(United States Soccer Federation) Chicago Eclipse Select
15	DF	Natalia Staude	30 April 2001 (aged 17)	(United States Soccer Federation) NTH Tophat
16	FW	Payton Linnehan	25 March 2001 (aged 17)	(United States Soccer Federation) FC Stars
17	DF	Samar Guidry	18 January 2002 (aged 16)	(United States Soccer Federation) FC Dallas
18	FW	Sunshine Fontes	25 February 2001 (aged 17)	(United States Soccer Federation) Hawaii Rush
19	DF	Michela Agresti	24 July 2001 (aged 17)	(United States Soccer Federation) FC Stars
20	MF	Sophie Jones	17 July 2001 (aged 17)	(United States Soccer Federation) San Jose Earthquakes
21	GK	Lindsey Romig	11 January 2001 (aged 17)	(United States Soccer Federation) IMG Academy

=== Cameroon ===
Head Coach: Stéphane Ndzana

No.	Pos.	Player	Date of birth (age)	Club
1	GK	Olga Ngo Esse	17 January 2002 (aged 16)	(Cameroonian Football Federation) Louves Minproff
2	MF	Florence Fanta	27 December 2002 (aged 15)	(Cameroonian Football Federation) ASFF Diamaré
3	DF	Diane Sindjie	22 February 2002 (aged 16)	(Cameroonian Football Federation) Amazone Fap
4	MF	Claudia Voulania	1 July 2001 (aged 17)	(Cameroonian Football Federation) ASFF Diamaré
5	MF	Natacha Elam	5 December 2001 (aged 16)	(Cameroonian Football Federation) Éclair FC
6	MF	Viviane Mefire	19 December 2001 (aged 16)	(Cameroonian Football Federation) Canon Yaoundé
7	DF	Alice Kameni	13 November 2001 (aged 17)	(Cameroonian Football Federation) AS Green City Filles
8	DF	Brenda Tabe	2 December 2003 (aged 14)	(Cameroonian Football Federation) Lekie Football Filles
9	DF	Élise Ndome	1 January 2003 (aged 15)	(Cameroonian Football Federation) Caïman Douala
10	MF	Fadimatou Aretouyap	22 July 2002 (aged 16)	(Cameroonian Football Federation) Oumi Filles
11	FW	Marie Ngah	20 October 2002 (aged 16)	(Cameroonian Football Federation) Amazone Fap
12	DF	Julie Nke	13 May 2002 (aged 16)	(Cameroonian Football Federation) Amazone Fap
13	DF	Jennifer Aboudi	22 October 2002 (aged 16)	(Cameroonian Football Federation) Éclair FC
14	MF	Henriette Monkam	9 May 2002 (aged 16)	(Cameroonian Football Federation) Amazone Fap
15	MF	Armelle Maffo	30 January 2002 (aged 16)	(Cameroonian Football Federation) Éclair FC
16	GK	Christemilie Onomo	27 April 2002 (aged 16)	(Cameroonian Football Federation) AS Patriotes Filles
17	FW	Moussa Zouwairatou	12 June 2001 (aged 17)	(Cameroonian Football Federation) Vent du Nord
18	DF	Vanessa Kalieu	23 June 2002 (aged 16)	(Cameroonian Football Federation) African Women's Association
19	FW	Thienny Nkoumou	25 January 2001 (aged 17)	(Cameroonian Football Federation) Amazone Fap
20	FW	Michele Moumazim	15 July 2001 (aged 17)	(Cameroonian Football Federation) Panthère Security Filles
21	GK	Pharelle Karis	15 September 2002 (aged 16)	(Cameroonian Football Federation) Éclair FC

=== North Korea ===
Head Coach: Song Sung-gwon

No.	Pos.	Player	Date of birth (age)	Club
1	GK	Yun Pyol	4 January 2002 (aged 16)	(DPR Korea Football Association) Naegohyang SC
2	DF	Kwak Un-sim	26 April 2001 (aged 17)	(DPR Korea Football Association) Naegohyang SC
3	DF	Ri Sin-ok	26 May 2003 (aged 15)	(DPR Korea Football Association) Naegohyang SC
4	DF	Pong Song-ae	30 November 2001 (aged 16)	(DPR Korea Football Association) Naegohyang SC
5	DF	Ri Kum-hyang	22 April 2001 (aged 17)	(DPR Korea Football Association) Naegohyang SC
6	MF	Ri Su-jong	5 July 2002 (aged 16)	(DPR Korea Football Association) Naegohyang SC
7	MF	Ri Su-gyong	14 April 2003 (aged 15)	(DPR Korea Football Association) Naegohyang SC
8	MF	Ryu Sol-song	27 February 2002 (aged 16)	(DPR Korea Football Association) Naegohyang SC
9	MF	Pang Un-sim	29 June 2001 (aged 17)	(DPR Korea Football Association) Naegohyang SC
10	FW	Kim Ryu-song	26 February 2002 (aged 16)	(DPR Korea Football Association) Naegohyang SC
11	MF	O Si-nae	14 January 2001 (aged 17)	(DPR Korea Football Association) Naegohyang SC
12	MF	Choe Kum-ok	23 February 2002 (aged 16)	(DPR Korea Football Association) Naegohyang SC
13	MF	Ko Kyong-hui	3 September 2001 (aged 17)	(DPR Korea Football Association) Ryomyong
14	FW	Kim Yun-ok	14 March 2003 (aged 15)	(DPR Korea Football Association) Naegohyang SC
15	MF	Yun Ji-hwa	3 January 2002 (aged 16)	(DPR Korea Football Association) Sobaeksu
16	MF	An Kuk-hyang	25 March 2001 (aged 17)	(DPR Korea Football Association) Ryomyong
17	FW	Kim Kyong-yong	2 January 2002 (aged 16)	(DPR Korea Football Association) Naegohyang SC
18	GK	Yu Son-gum	8 November 2003 (aged 15)	(DPR Korea Football Association) Sobaeksu
19	FW	Pak Il-gyong	18 April 2002 (aged 16)	(DPR Korea Football Association) Naegohyang SC
20	DF	Pak Hye-gyong	7 November 2001 (aged 17)	(DPR Korea Football Association) Ryomyong
21	GK	Ri Hyon-gyong	9 September 2003 (aged 15)	(DPR Korea Football Association) Naegohyang SC

=== Germany ===
Head coach: Ulrike Ballweg

No.	Pos.	Player	Date of birth (age)	Club
1	GK	Wiebke Willebrandt	16 January 2001 (aged 17)	(German Football Association) TuS Lipperode
2	DF	Laura Donhauser	4 September 2001 (aged 17)	(German Football Association) Bayern Munich
3	DF	Julia Pollak	9 May 2002 (aged 16)	(German Football Association) Bayern Munich
4	DF	Emilie Bernhardt	5 May 2002 (aged 16)	(German Football Association) Bayern Munich
5	DF	Greta Stegemann	12 February 2001 (aged 17)	(German Football Association) SC Freiburg
6	DF	Anna Aehling	23 March 2001 (aged 17)	(German Football Association) FSV Gütersloh 2009
7	MF	Gia Corley	20 May 2002 (aged 16)	(German Football Association) Bayern Munich
8	MF	Leonie Köster	6 April 2001 (aged 17)	(German Football Association) Bayern Munich
9	FW	Shekiera Martinez	4 July 2001 (aged 17)	(German Football Association) 1. FFC Frankfurt
10	FW	Ivana Fuso	12 March 2001 (aged 17)	(German Football Association) SC Freiburg
11	MF	Vanessa Fudalla	21 October 2001 (aged 17)	(German Football Association) Bayern Munich
12	GK	Maria Luisa Grohs	13 June 2001 (aged 17)	(German Football Association) 1. FC Gievenbeck
13	MF	Aliya Diagne	8 May 2001 (aged 17)	(German Football Association) SV Göttelborn
14	DF	Madeleine Steck	31 January 2002 (aged 16)	(German Football Association) 1. FFC Frankfurt
15	DF	Lina Jubel	26 January 2001 (aged 17)	(German Football Association) VfL Wolfsburg
16	FW	Gentiana Fetaj	4 August 2002 (aged 16)	(German Football Association) FSV Gütersloh 2009
17	MF	Leonie Weber	20 January 2002 (aged 16)	(German Football Association) Bayern Munich
18	DF	Charlotte Blümel	8 December 2001 (aged 16)	(German Football Association) FSV Gütersloh 2009
19	MF	Pauline Berning	9 January 2001 (aged 17)	(German Football Association) FSV Gütersloh 2009
20	FW	Sophie Weidauer	10 February 2002 (aged 16)	(German Football Association) 1. FFC Turbine Potsdam
21	GK	Pauline Nelles	20 January 2002 (aged 16)	(German Football Association) FC Köln

== Group D ==
=== South Korea ===
Head Coach: Hur Jung-jae

No.	Pos.	Player	Date of birth (age)	Club
1	GK	Kim Su-jeong	12 September 2001 (aged 17)	(Korea Football Association) Hyundai Senior High School
2	DF	Kim Min-ji	21 August 2003 (aged 15)	(Korea Football Association) Hyundai Senior High School
3	DF	Lee Jin	22 April 2001 (aged 17)	(Korea Football Association) Hyundai Senior High School
4	DF	Ko Min-jung	14 May 2001 (aged 17)	(Korea Football Association) Hyundai Senior High School
5	DF	Lee Su-in	30 April 2002 (aged 16)	(Korea Football Association) Hyundai Senior High School
6	MF	An Se-bin	14 January 2001 (aged 17)	(Korea Football Association) Hyundai Senior High School
7	MF	Hwang Ah-hyeon	12 November 2001 (aged 17)	(Korea Football Association) Hyundai Senior High School
8	MF	Kim Ye-eun	11 May 2003 (aged 15)	(Korea Football Association) Hyundai Chungun High School
9	FW	Cho Mi-jin	4 April 2001 (aged 17)	(Korea Football Association) Hyundai Senior High School
10	FW	Gwak Ro-yeong	19 July 2003 (aged 15)	(Korea Football Association) Hyundai Chungun High School
11	FW	Jang You-been	10 February 2002 (aged 16)	(Korea Football Association) Hyundai Senior High School
12	MF	Chun Ga-ram	19 October 2002 (aged 16)	(Korea Football Association) Hyundai Senior High School
13	DF	Kim Ji-mi	31 January 2001 (aged 17)	(Korea Football Association) Hyundai Senior High School
14	MF	Kim Bo-min	27 November 2001 (aged 16)	(Korea Football Association) Hyundai Senior High School
15	DF	Mun Ha-yeon	27 May 2002 (aged 16)	(Korea Football Association) Hyundai Senior High School
16	MF	Lee Eun-young	31 March 2002 (aged 16)	(Korea Football Association) Hyundai Senior High School
17	MF	Kim Bit-na	10 April 2001 (aged 17)	(Korea Football Association) Hyundai Senior High School
18	GK	Jeon So-eun	13 February 2001 (aged 17)	(Korea Football Association) Hyundai Senior High School
19	MF	Jo Ye-song	29 March 2001 (aged 17)	(Korea Football Association) Hyundai Senior High School
20	DF	Noh Hye-yeon	3 September 2001 (aged 17)	(Korea Football Association) Hyundai Senior High School
21	GK	Kang Ji-yeon	11 June 2001 (aged 17)	(Korea Football Association) Hyundai Senior High School

=== Spain ===
Head Coach: Toña Is

No.	Pos.	Player	Date of birth (age)	Club
1	GK	Paula Suárez	6 August 2001 (aged 17)	(Royal Spanish Football Federation) Sporting Gijón
2	MF	Nerea Nevado	27 April 2001 (aged 17)	(Royal Spanish Football Federation) Athletic Club B
3	DF	Ana Tejada	2 June 2002 (aged 16)	(Royal Spanish Football Federation) EDF Logroño
4	DF	Teresa Mérida	17 July 2002 (aged 16)	(Royal Spanish Football Federation) Cádiz CF
5	DF	Jana Fernández	18 February 2002 (aged 16)	(Royal Spanish Football Federation) FC Barcelona B
6	MF	Irene López	26 September 2001 (aged 17)	(Royal Spanish Football Federation) Madrid CFF
7	MF	Paola Hernández	25 July 2002 (aged 16)	(Royal Spanish Football Federation) UD Granadilla Tenerife
8	MF	Isabel Pala	25 November 2002 (aged 15)	(Royal Spanish Football Federation) Madrid CFF
9	MF	María Isabel Okoye	30 July 2001 (aged 17)	(Royal Spanish Football Federation) CD Tacón
10	FW	Clàudia Pina	12 August 2001 (aged 17)	(Royal Spanish Football Federation) FC Barcelona B
11	FW	Salma Paralluelo	13 November 2003 (aged 15)	(Royal Spanish Football Federation) Zaragoza CFF
12	MF	Leire Peña	20 June 2001 (aged 17)	(Royal Spanish Football Federation) Atlético Madrid B
13	GK	Catalina Coll	23 April 2001 (aged 17)	(Royal Spanish Football Federation) UD Collerense
14	FW	Ainhoa Marín	21 March 2001 (aged 17)	(Royal Spanish Football Federation) RCD Espanyol B
15	DF	Naroa Uriarte	5 February 2001 (aged 17)	(Royal Spanish Football Federation) Athletic Club B
16	FW	Paula Arana	8 November 2001 (aged 17)	(Royal Spanish Football Federation) Athletic Club B
17	DF	María Méndez	10 April 2001 (aged 17)	(Royal Spanish Football Federation) Real Oviedo
18	FW	Eva Navarro	27 January 2001 (aged 17)	(Royal Spanish Football Federation) Levante UD
19	MF	Eva Alonso	23 July 2002 (aged 16)	(Royal Spanish Football Federation) Rayo Vallecano B
20	GK	María López	26 November 2002 (aged 15)	(Royal Spanish Football Federation) Granada CF
21	DF	Aixa Salvador	12 October 2001 (aged 17)	(Royal Spanish Football Federation) Villarreal CF

=== Canada ===
Head Coach: Rhian Wilkinson

No.	Pos.	Player	Date of birth (age)	Club
1	GK	Anna Karpenko	10 April 2002 (aged 16)	(Canadian Soccer Association) Ontario REX
2	FW	Jayde Riviere	22 January 2001 (aged 17)	(Canadian Soccer Association) Ontario REX
3	DF	Julianne Vallerand	9 August 2001 (aged 17)	(Canadian Soccer Association) Quebec REX
4	DF	Sonia Walk	12 August 2002 (aged 16)	(Canadian Soccer Association) Ontario REX
5	DF	Maya Antoine	8 August 2001 (aged 17)	(Canadian Soccer Association) Ontario REX
6	DF	Ariel Young	30 August 2001 (aged 17)	(Canadian Soccer Association) Whitecaps FC Girls Elite
7	FW	Serita Thurton	16 January 2002 (aged 16)	(Canadian Soccer Association) Ontario REX
8	MF	Caitlin Shaw	20 July 2001 (aged 17)	(Canadian Soccer Association) Whitecaps FC Girls Elite
9	FW	Jordyn Huitema	8 May 2001 (aged 17)	(Canadian Soccer Association) Whitecaps FC Girls Elite
10	FW	Teni Akindoju	8 July 2001 (aged 17)	(Canadian Soccer Association) Whitecaps FC Girls Elite
11	FW	Kaila Novak	24 March 2002 (aged 16)	(Canadian Soccer Association) Ontario REX
12	MF	Lara Kazandjian	27 September 2002 (aged 16)	(Canadian Soccer Association) Quebec REX
13	DF	Léonie Portelance	7 November 2001 (aged 17)	(Canadian Soccer Association) Quebec REX
14	MF	Wayny Balata	25 June 2001 (aged 17)	(Canadian Soccer Association) Quebec REX
15	MF	Jazmine Wilkinson	8 March 2002 (aged 16)	(Canadian Soccer Association) Whitecaps FC Girls Elite
16	DF	Jade Rose	12 February 2003 (aged 15)	(Canadian Soccer Association) Ontario REX
17	FW	Andersen Williams	2 April 2002 (aged 16)	(Canadian Soccer Association) Whitecaps FC Girls Elite
18	GK	Sophie Guilmette	24 March 2001 (aged 17)	(Canadian Soccer Association) Quebec REX
19	DF	Bella Hanisch	29 January 2002 (aged 16)	(Canadian Soccer Association) Ontario REX
20	FW	Jessica De Filippo	20 April 2001 (aged 17)	(Canadian Soccer Association) Quebec REX
21	GK	Kayza Massey	2 February 2001 (aged 17)	(Canadian Soccer Association) Ontario REX

=== Colombia ===
Head Coach: Didier Luna

No.	Pos.	Player	Date of birth (age)	Club
1	GK	Michell Lugo	16 April 2001 (aged 17)	(Colombian Football Federation) La Equidad
2	DF	Laura Orozco	8 January 2001 (aged 17)	(Colombian Football Federation) Llaneros F.C.
3	DF	Sharon Ramírez	29 January 2001 (aged 17)	(Colombian Football Federation) Gol Star
4	DF	Paula Gómez	27 November 2001 (aged 16)	(Colombian Football Federation) Club Bacata
5	MF	Andrea Pérez	20 October 2001 (aged 17)	(Colombian Football Federation) Unión Magdalena
6	MF	Kelly Caicedo	26 November 2002 (aged 15)	(Colombian Football Federation) América de Cali
7	FW	Gisela Robledo	13 May 2003 (aged 15)	(Colombian Football Federation) Atlas CP
8	MF	Sara Martínez	22 January 2001 (aged 17)	(Colombian Football Federation) Formas Íntimas
9	MF	Wendy Bonilla	8 July 2002 (aged 16)	(Colombian Football Federation) Generaciones Palmiranas
10	FW	Maireth Pérez	31 March 2001 (aged 17)	(Colombian Football Federation) Formas Íntimas
11	FW	Natalia Ramírez	29 May 2001 (aged 17)	(United States Soccer Federation) Tiburones Blancos
12	GK	Laura Galindo	3 March 2002 (aged 16)	(Colombian Football Federation) Gol Star
13	MF	Elizabeth Carabalí	23 July 2001 (aged 17)	(Colombian Football Federation) Atlas CP
14	DF	Laura Marcelo	20 March 2002 (aged 16)	(Colombian Football Federation) Formas Íntimas
15	DF	Ana Bohórquez	14 July 2001 (aged 17)	(Colombian Football Federation) Independiente Santa Fe
16	MF	Ilana Izquierdo	14 June 2002 (aged 16)	(Colombian Football Federation) Atlas CP
17	MF	Valentina Jaramillo	10 February 2001 (aged 17)	(Colombian Football Federation) Llaneros F.C.
18	MF	Maria Reyes	11 May 2002 (aged 16)	(Colombian Football Federation) Kapital Soccer
19	MF	Lina Jaime	22 November 2001 (aged 16)	(Colombian Football Federation) Gol Star
20	FW	Luisa Vertel	3 February 2001 (aged 17)	(Colombian Football Federation) Tiburones Blancos
21	GK	Valentina González	7 February 2002 (aged 16)	(Colombian Football Federation) Kapital Soccer
