= Teresa Mérida =

Spanish footballer (born 2002)

Personal information
- Full name: Teresa Mérida Cañete
- Date of birth: 17 July 2002 (age 24)
- Place of birth: Jerez de la Frontera, Spain
- Height: 1.66 m (5 ft 5 in)
- Position: Defender

Senior career*
Years	Team	Apps	(Gls)
2019–2024	Sevilla	70	(1)
2024–2026	Levante UD	54	(0)
- * Club domestic league appearances and goals as of 31 May 2025

Teresa Mérida Cañete (born 17 July 2002) is a Spanish footballer who plays as a defender.

== Early life ==
Mérida is originally from Jerez. Her mother is called Teresa and her father is called Antonio. She also has a sister, María.

== Club career ==
Mérida started her career at Sevilla. In 2019, she won the award for Best Promising Female Sportsperson at the Andalusia Sports Awards. In July, 2024, she left Sevilla and joined Levante with a two season contract.

== International career ==
Mérida has represented Spain at under-17 level. With them, she won both the World Cup and the UEFA Championship, both in 2018.
