= Naroa Uriarte =

Spanish footballer (born 2001)

Personal information
- Full name: Naroa Uriarte Urazurrutia
- Date of birth: 5 February 2001 (age 25)
- Place of birth: Bilbao, Spain
- Height: 1.68 m (5 ft 6 in)
- Position: Defender

Team information
- Current team: Granada (on loan from Athletic Club)
- Number: 5

Youth career
- 2013–2016: Bizkerre

Senior career*
Years	Team	Apps	(Gls)
2016–2020	Athletic Club B	82	(10)
2019–	Athletic Club	37	(1)
2024	→ Granada (loan)	5	(0)
2024–	→ Granada (loan)	1	(0)

International career^{‡}
2018	Spain U17	5	(0)
2021	Spain U23	1	(0)
- * Club domestic league appearances and goals as of 27 October 2024 ‡ National team caps and goals as of 05:37, 22 December 2023 (UTC)

Naroa Uriarte Urazurrutia (born 5 February 2001) is a Spanish footballer who plays as a defender for Granada, on loan from Athletic Club.

== Club career ==
Uriarte started her career in Bizkerre's academy.

In December 2021, she tore the anterior cruciate ligament in her right knee, with the injury keeping her out for almost a year.

In January 2024, Uriarte moved on loan to Granada until the end of the season. In August of the same year she returned to Granada, this time on a year's loan, along with Paula Arana and Amaia Iribarren.

== International career ==
Uriarte was a member of the Spain under-17 squad that won the 2018 UEFA Women's Under-17 Championship in Lithuania and the 2018 FIFA U-17 Women's World Cup in Uruguay.
