= Lakeesha Eijken =

Dutch-born Suriname footballer (born 2001)

Personal information
- Full name: Lakeesha Melissa Eijken
- Date of birth: 1 July 2001 (age 25)
- Place of birth: Amsterdam, Netherlands
- Position: Forward

Youth career
- Ajax

Senior career*
Years	Team	Apps	(Gls)
2018–2020	Ajax	0	(0)
2020–2022	Gent	27	(4)
2022–2023	Standard Liège	9	(1)
2023–2024	ADO Den Haag	12	(0)
2024–2025	Fortuna Sittard	20	(1)
2026	Elche	0	(0)
2026–	Hera United	0	(0)

International career^{‡}
2018	Netherlands U17	1	(0)
2022–2026	Netherlands U20	4	(0)
2026–	Suriname	1	(0)
- * Club domestic league appearances and goals as of 26 June 2026 ‡ National team caps and goals as of 26 June 2026

Lakeesha Melissa Eijken (Dutch: [ləˈkiːʃə məˈlɪsə ˈɛi̯.kən]; born 1 July 2001) is a professional footballer who plays as a forward for Vrouwen Eerste Divisie club Hera United. Born in the Netherlands, she plays for the Suriname national team.

Eijken previously played for Vrouwen Eredivisie clubs Ajax, ADO Den Haag and Fortuna Sittard, Belgian Women's Super League (BWSL) clubs KAA Gent and Standard Liège, and Tercera Federación club Elche. She also previously represented the Netherlands at under-17 and under-23 level.

== Early life ==
Eijken was born on 1 July 2001 in Amsterdam, North Holland. She is of Surinamese descent.

== Club career ==
=== Ajax ===
Eijken came through the academy of Vrouwen Eredivisie club Ajax. However, she never made an appearance for the club's first team.

=== KAA Gent ===
Eijken moved to Belgium and signed for Belgian Women's Super League (BWSL) club KAA Gent ahead of the 2020–21 season.

Eijken remained at the club for the 2021–22 season. However, she departed the club at the end of the season after being signed by fellow BWSL club Standard Liège. She made a total of 27 appearances and scored four goals throughout her two seasons at the club.

=== Standard Liège ===
Staying in the Belgian Women's Super League (BWSL), Eijken signed a one-year contract for Standard Liège ahead of the 2022–23 season. She departed the club at the end of the season, having made a total of nine appearances and scoring one goal.

=== ADO Den Haag ===
Upon returning to the Netherlands, Eijken signed for Vrouwen Eredivisie club ADO Den Haag ahead of the 2023–24 season. She departed the club at the end of the season alongside eight other players. She made a total of 12 appearances throughout the season.

=== Fortuna Sittard ===
Staying in the Vrouwen Eredivisie, Eijken signed for Fortuna Sittard ahead of the 2024–25 season. On her début in the season opener, she opened the scoring in the second minute against Twente, though Fortuna lost 3–1 at home at Fortuna Sittard Stadion in Nieuw Absbroek, Sittard, Limburg. She departed the club at the end of the season, having made a total of 20 appearances and scoring one goal.

=== Elche ===
Eijken moved to Spain and signed for Tercera Federación Elche during the 2025–26 season, arriving as a free agent. She left the club at the end of the season without having made a single appearance.

=== Hera United ===
Eijken returned to the Netherlands and signed for Vrouwen Eerste Divisie club Hera United ahead of the 2026–27 season.

== International career ==
=== Netherlands U17 ===
Eijken received her first and only call-up for the Netherlands under-17 national team when she was named as part of Marleen Wissink's 20-player squad for the 2018 UEFA Women's Under-17 Championship in Lithuania from 9 to 21 May. She made her début and only appearance on 15 May in a 2–1 loss in the group stage to Finland at Sūduva Stadium in Degučiai, Marijampolė, coming on as a substitute for Nikita Tromp in the 41st minute. The Netherlands were eliminated in the group stage, finishing third with four points with a win, a draw and a loss.

=== Netherlands U23 ===
In 2021, Eijken was called up for the Netherlands under-23 national team for two friendlies against Portugal and Belgium on 25 and 29 November, respectively. In the first match (a 4–0 victory over Portugal at home at Sportcomplex Varkenoord in Sportdorp, Rotterdam, South Holland), she came on as a substitute for Esmee Brugts in the 66th minute. In the next match (a 5–1 away win over Belgium at Van Roystadion in Denderleeuw, East Flanders), she started before coming off in the 78th minute to make way for Romée van de Lavoir.

In 2022, Eijken was called up once again for the under-23 national team, this time for a two-match friendly series against England in Spain on 8 and 11 April, with both matches held at Pinatar Arena in El Mojón, San Pedro del Pinatar, Murcia. In the first game (a 0–0 draw), she came on as a substitute for Ashleigh Weerden in the 61st minute. In the second game (a 3–0 defeat), she once again came on as a substitute for Weerden, this time in the 66th minute.

=== Suriname ===
In 2026, after receiving no further call-ups for the Netherlands at any level, Eijken requested to switch her allegiance to Suriname, being eligible through her Surinamese heritage. Her request was officially approved by the International Association Football Federation (FIFA) on 2 March.

Eijken was called up for Suriname for a 2026 CONCACAF W Championship qualification group stage match against Haiti on 4 March, a match which would serve as a qualifier for the FIFA World Cup in Brazil. She was part of a large contingent of Dutch-born players called up as part of a broader effort by the Surinamese Football Association (SVB) to cap members of the diaspora, with Suriname being a former Dutch colony. She made her début in the match, coming on as a substitute for Rachel van Netten in the 66th minute. Suriname suffered a 2–0 defeat in the match, which was held at home at the Dr. Ir. Franklin Essed Stadion in Flora, Paramaribo, Paramaribo District.
