= Ivana Fuso =

Brazilian footballer (born 2001)

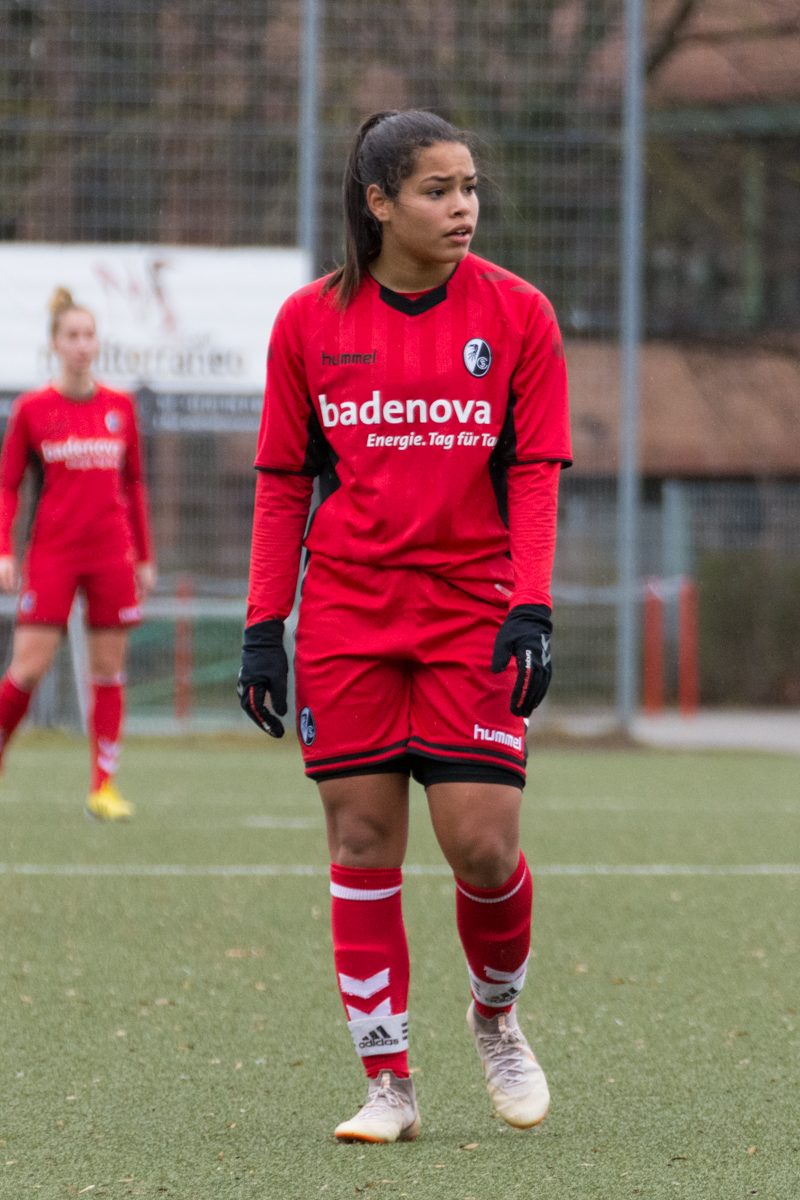
- Fuso in 2018

Personal information
- Full name: Ivana Ferreira Fuso
- Date of birth: 12 March 2001 (age 25)
- Place of birth: Salvador, Bahia, Brazil
- Height: 1.64 m (5 ft 5 in)
- Position: Forward

Team information
- Current team: Corinthians

Youth career
- SV Böblingen
- 2016–2017: SC Freiburg

Senior career*
Years	Team	Apps	(Gls)
2017–2018	SC Freiburg II	10	(3)
2017–2019	SC Freiburg	3	(0)
2019–2020	FC Basel	13	(6)
2020–2023	Manchester United	12	(0)
2022–2023	→ Bayer Leverkusen (loan)	11	(1)
2023–2025	Birmingham City	21	(5)
2025–	Corinthians	0	(0)

International career^{‡}
2014–2016	Germany U15	10	(3)
2016–2017	Germany U16	9	(6)
2017–2018	Germany U17	20	(12)
2019	Germany U19	10	(5)
2021–	Brazil	4	(0)
Medal record
Representing Germany
UEFA Women's Under-17 Championship
Runner-up	2018 Lithuania
- * Club domestic league appearances and goals as of 20 May 2023 ‡ National team caps and goals as of 1 December 2021

Ivana Ferreira Fuso (born 12 March 2001) is a Brazilian professional footballer who plays as a forward for Corinthians and the Brazil national team. Born in Salvador, Bahia, and raised in Germany, she played for her adoptive nation at youth international level, and earned caps for the under-15s, under-16s, under-17s and under-19s.

== Club career ==
=== SC Freiburg ===
Fuso moved from SV Böblingen to the youth academy of SC Freiburg in the summer of 2016. Initially, Fuso was part of the under-17 squad and competed in the B-Junior Bundesliga South, scoring 16 goals in 17 appearances. From the 2017–18 season, Fuso was elevated to SC Freiburg II in the 2. Bundesliga. She made her SC Freiburg II debut on 24 September 2017 in a 0–0 draw against VfL Sindelfingen. She scored her first goal for the team in a 1–1 draw against 1. FC Köln II. On 31 March 2018, Fuso made her SC Freiburg first-team debut as a 71st-minute substitute for Klara Bühl in a 3–0 away win against Werder Bremen.

=== FC Basel ===
On 30 June 2019, Fuso moved to Swiss Nationalliga A team FC Basel.

=== Manchester United ===
On 14 July 2020, Fuso signed a two-year contract with an option for a third with English FA WSL club Manchester United. After suffering two separate muscle and ligament tears at the beginning of the season, Fuso was named in a matchday squad for the first time on 19 November 2020 but was an unused substitute during the 0–0 League Cup draw with Manchester City. She made her debut on 16 December 2020 as a 76th-minute substitute in a 1–0 defeat to Everton in the same competition. Her first season with the club was ended in March after picking up an ankle injury having made six appearances in all competitions, all as a substitute.

==== Bayer Leverkusen loan ====
On 7 July 2022, it was announced Fuso had signed a contract extension at Manchester United until June 2024 and loaned out to Bayer Leverkusen of the German Frauen-Bundesliga for the duration of the 2022–23 season.

=== Birmingham City ===
On 14 September 2023, it was announced that Fuso had joined English Women's Championship side Birmingham City for a club record transfer fee on a two-year deal, with an option for a third year.

== International career ==
=== Youth ===
Fuso has represented Germany at youth level from under-15 up to under-19. She made her national team debut on 28 October 2014 for the under-15 national team in a 13–0 victory over Scotland as a 13-year-old. She scored her first goal on 4 June 2015 for the under-15 team in a 7–0 win against Czech Republic.

In 2018, Fuso was part of the under-17 squads for both the 2018 UEFA Women's Under-17 Championship and 2018 FIFA U-17 Women's World Cup. She captained the side and scored two goals at the Euros as Germany finished runners-up, losing in the final to Spain. The team finished top of their group at the World Cup but was eliminated by Canada at the quarter-final stage.

Fuso appeared twice during 2019 UEFA Women's Under-19 Championship qualification, scoring in an elite round win over Greece in April 2019, but was not selected for the tournament squad in July. She returned to the squad for 2020 UEFA Women's Under-19 Championship qualification, scoring three goals in three appearances during the first qualifying round.

=== Senior ===
In January 2021, Fuso was called up to the senior Brazil national team for the 2021 SheBelieves Cup. She made her debut on 18 February in the opening game of the tournament as a 67th-minute substitute for Chú Santos in a 4–1 win over Argentina. In November 2021, Fuso was called up for the 2021 Torneio Internacional de Futebol Feminino, making two substitute appearances against Venezuela and Chile as Brazil won the tournament.

== Personal life ==
On 8 July 2021, Fuso married fellow Brazilian-German Rodrigo Ferreira, a footballer in the Landesliga, during a small ceremony in Sindelfingen after a three-year relationship. Ahead of the 2021–22 season, she announced she would be playing under her married surname, Ferreira Fuso.

== Career statistics ==
=== Club ===
As of match played 20 May 2023.

Appearances and goals by club, season and competition
Club	Season	League			National cup (Note: Includes DFB-Pokal, Swiss Cup, FA Cup)		League cup (Note: Includes the League Cup)		Total	
Club	Season	Division	Apps	Goals	Apps	Goals	Apps	Goals	Apps	Goals
SC Freiburg II	2017–18	2. Bundesliga	10	3	—		—		10	3
SC Freiburg	2017–18	Bundesliga	1	0	0	0	—		1	0
SC Freiburg	2018–19	Bundesliga	2	0	0	0	—		2	0
SC Freiburg	Total		3	0	0	0	0	0	3	0
FC Basel	2019–20	Nationalliga A	13	6	1	1	—		14	7
Manchester United	2020–21	WSL	5	0	0	0	1	0	6	0
Manchester United	2021–22	WSL	7	0	2	0	6	2	15	2
Manchester United	Total		12	0	2	0	7	2	21	2
Bayer Leverkusen	2022–23	Bundesliga	10	1	1	0	—		11	1
Career total			48	10	4	1	7	2	59	13

=== International ===
As of match played 1 December 2021

Appearances and goals by national team and year
National team	Year	Apps	Goals
Brazil	2021	4	0
Total		4	0

== Honours ==
SC Freiburg

- DFB-Pokal runner-up: 2019

Germany

- UEFA Women's Under-17 Championship runner-up: 2018

Brazil

- Torneio Internacional de Futebol Feminino: 2021
