= Paula Arana =

Spanish footballer (born 2001)

Personal information
- Full name: Paula Arana Montes
- Date of birth: 8 November 2001 (age 25)
- Place of birth: Vitoria-Gasteiz, Spain
- Height: 1.72 m (5 ft 8 in)
- Position: Forward

Team information
- Current team: Espanyol
- Number: 16

Youth career
- Aurrera Vitoria

Senior career*
Years	Team	Apps	(Gls)
2016–2018	Aurrera Vitoria		
2018–2021	Athletic Club B	57	(21)
2020–	Athletic Club	77	(4)
2024–	→ Granada (loan)	4	(0)

International career^{‡}
2018	Spain U17	7	(2)
2022–	Spain U23	13	(4)
- * Club domestic league appearances and goals as of 27 October 2024 ‡ National team caps and goals as of 04:50, 22 December 2023 (UTC)

Paula Arana Montes (born 8 November 2001) is a Spanish professional footballer who plays as a forward for Liga F club Espanyol.

== Club career ==
Arana started her career at Aurrera Vitoria.

In August 2024 she moved to Granada on a year's loan, along with Naroa Uriarte and Amaia Iribarren.

== International career ==
Arana was a member of the Spain under-17 squad that won the 2018 UEFA Women's Under-17 Championship in Lithuania and the 2018 FIFA U-17 Women's World Cup in Uruguay.
