= 2018 UEFA Women's Under-17 Championship =

2018 m. Europos moterų U-17 futbolo čempionatas

Tournament details
- Host country: Lithuania
- Dates: 9–21 May
- Teams: 8 (from 1 confederation)
- Venues: 3 (in 3 host cities)

Final positions
- Champions: Spain (4th title)
- Runners-up: Germany
- Third place: Finland
- Fourth place: England

Tournament statistics
- Matches played: 16
- Goals scored: 61 (3.81 per match)
- Top scorer(s): (Germany) Shekiera Martinez (9 goals)

The 2018 UEFA Women's Under-17 Championship (also known as UEFA Women's Under-17 Euro 2018) was the 11th edition of the UEFA Women's Under-17 Championship. It is the annual international youth football championship organised by UEFA for women under-17 of Europe national teams. Lithuania, which were selected by UEFA on 26 January 2015, hosted the tournament from 9 to 21 May 2018.

A total of eight teams played in the tournament, with players born on or after 1 January 2001 were the ones eligible to participate. Each match had a duration of 80 minutes, consisting of two halves of 40 minutes with a 15-minute half-time.

Same as previous editions held in even-numbered years, the tournament acted as the UEFA qualifiers for the FIFA U-17 Women's World Cup. The top three teams of the tournament qualified for the 2018 FIFA U-17 Women's World Cup in Uruguay as UEFA representatives.

Spain won their fourth title by beating defending champions Germany 2–0 in the final.

== Qualifications ==
A total of 46 UEFA nations entered the competition, and with the hosts Lithuania qualifying automatically; the other 45 teams competed in the qualifying competition to determine the remaining seven spots in the final tournament. The qualifying competition consisted of two rounds: Qualifying round, which took place in autumn 2017, and Elite round, which took place in spring 2018.

=== Qualified teams ===
The following teams qualified for the final tournament.

Team	Method of qualification	Appearance	Last appearance	Previous best performance
Lithuania	Hosts	1st	—	Debut
Netherlands	Elite round Group 1 winners	3rd	2017 (semi-finals)	Fourth place (2010), Semi-finals (2017)
Finland	Elite round Group 2 winners	1st	—	Debut
Spain	Elite round Group 3 winners	9th	2017 (runners-up)	Champions (2010, 2011, 2015)
Italy	Elite round Group 4 winners	3rd	2016 (group stage)	Third place (2014)
England	Elite round Group 5 winners	6th	2017 (group stage)	Third place (2016)
Poland	Elite round Group 6 winners	2nd	2013 (champions)	Champions (2013)
Germany	Elite round Group 7 winners	10th	2017 (champions)	Champions (2008, 2009, 2012, 2014, 2016, 2017)

=== Final draw ===
The final draw was held on 6 April 2018, 10:00 EEST (UTC+3), at the Kaunas State Musical Theatre in Kaunas, Lithuania. The eight teams were drawn into two groups of four teams. There was no seeding, except that hosts Lithuania were assigned to position A1 in the draw.

== Venues ==
In January 2015 Lithuanian Football Federation announced plans to host championships in Kaunas, Alytus, Marijampolė and Jonava, although Central stadium of Jonava had to improve the conditions in stadium. In early 2018 it was announced that competition would be held in three cities: Alytus, Marijampolė and Šiauliai.

Marijampolė	2018 UEFA Women's Under-17 Championship is located in Lithuania	Alytus	Šiauliai
Sūduva Stadium	2018 UEFA Women's Under-17 Championship is located in Lithuania	Alytus Stadium	Savivaldybė Stadium
Capacity: 6,500	2018 UEFA Women's Under-17 Championship is located in Lithuania	Capacity: 3,748	Capacity: 4,000

== Match officials ==
A total of 6 referees, 8 assistant referees and 2 fourth officials were appointed for the final tournament.

Referees

- (Bulgaria) Khristiyana Guteva
- (Czech Republic) Lucie Šulcová
- (Denmark) Frida Mia Klarlund Nielsen
- (North Macedonia) Irena Velevačkoska
- (Switzerland) Désirée Grundbacher
- (Ukraine) Kateryna Usova

Assistant referees

- (Austria) Sara Telek
- (Bosnia and Herzegovina) Almira Spahić
- (Croatia) Maja Petravić
- (Cyprus) Polyxeni Irodotou
- (France) Élodie Coppola
- (Kazakhstan) Yelena Alistratova
- (Latvia) Diāna Vanaga
- (Sweden) Sandra Österberg

Fourth officials

- (Lithuania) Rasa Imanalijeva
- (Lithuania) Jurgita Mačikunytė

== Squads ==
Each national team submitted a squad of 20 players (Regulations Article 41).

== Group stage ==
The final tournament schedule was confirmed on 12 April 2018.

The group winners and runners-up advance to the semi-finals.

Tiebreakers

In the group stage, teams are ranked according to points (3 points for a win, 1 point for a draw, 0 points for a loss), and if tied on points, the following tiebreaking criteria are applied, in the order given, to determine the rankings (Regulations Articles 17.01 and 17.02):

1. Points in head-to-head matches among tied teams;
2. Goal difference in head-to-head matches among tied teams;
3. Goals scored in head-to-head matches among tied teams;
4. If more than two teams are tied, and after applying all head-to-head criteria above, a subset of teams are still tied, all head-to-head criteria above are reapplied exclusively to this subset of teams;
5. Goal difference in all group matches;
6. Goals scored in all group matches;
7. Penalty shoot-out if only two teams have the same number of points, and they met in the last round of the group and are tied after applying all criteria above (not used if more than two teams have the same number of points, or if their rankings are not relevant for qualification for the next stage);
8. Disciplinary points (red card = 3 points, yellow card = 1 point, expulsion for two yellow cards in one match = 3 points);
9. UEFA coefficient for the qualifying round draw;
10. Drawing of lots.

All times are local, EEST (UTC+3).

=== Group A ===
Pos	Team	Pld	W	D	L	GF	GA	GD	Pts	Qualification
1	Germany	3	2	1	0	12	3	+9	7	Knockout stage
2	Finland	3	2	0	1	7	3	+4	6	Knockout stage
3	Netherlands	3	1	1	1	12	4	+8	4	
4	Lithuania (H)	3	0	0	3	0	21	−21	0	

Source: UEFA
Rules for classification: Group stage tiebreakers
(H) Hosts
9 May 2018
17:00

Finland	1–2	Germany
Vuorinen 53'	Report	Martinez 71', 80'

Sūduva Stadium, Marijampolė
Referee: Irena Velevačkoska (Macedonia)
9 May 2018
19:00

Lithuania	0–9	Netherlands
	Report	Ubartaitė 2' (o.g.); Van de Westeringh 10', 17', 79'; Van de Velde 15'; Leuchter 25', 75'; Tromp 29' (pen.); Foederer 60'

Alytus Stadium, Alytus
Referee: Hristiana Guteva (Bulgaria)

12 May 2018
11:00

Germany	2–2	Netherlands
Martinez 73'; Donhauser 80+4'	Report	Hendriks 28'; Grant 52'

Savivaldybė Stadium, Šiauliai
Referee: Désirée Grundbacher (Switzerland)
12 May 2018
17:00

Lithuania	0–4	Finland
	Report	Huhta 25', 39', 63'; Koivisto 52' (pen.)

Savivaldybė Stadium, Šiauliai
Referee: Lucie Šulcová (Czech Republic)

15 May 2018
19:00

Germany	8–0	Lithuania
Corley 35'; Fuso 44'; Weidauer 47', 80+2'; Martinez 56', 57', 65'; Fudalla 76'	Report

Alytus Stadium, Alytus
Referee: Kateryna Usova (Ukraine)
15 May 2018
19:00

Netherlands	1–2	Finland
Leuchter 77' (pen.)	Report	Juvonen 50'; Vuorinen 73'

Sūduva Stadium, Marijampolė
Referee: Frida Nielsen (Denmark)

=== Group B ===
Pos	Team	Pld	W	D	L	GF	GA	GD	Pts	Qualification
1	Spain	3	2	1	0	7	1	+6	7	Knockout stage
2	England	3	1	1	1	7	4	+3	4	Knockout stage
3	Italy	3	0	2	1	0	4	−4	2	
4	Poland	3	0	2	1	2	7	−5	2	

Source: UEFA
Rules for classification: Group stage tiebreakers
9 May 2018
11:00

Italy	0–0	Spain
	Report

Savivaldybė Stadium, Šiauliai
Referee: Frida Nielsen (Denmark)
9 May 2018
17:00

Poland	2–2	England
Filipczak 48'; Tomasiak 80+2'	Report	Park 58'; McKenzie 68'

Savivaldybė Stadium, Šiauliai
Referee: Lucie Šulcová (Czech Republic)

12 May 2018
13:00

Spain	2–1	England
Arana 4'; Navarro 70'	Report	Salmon 26'

Alytus Stadium, Alytus
Referee: Kateryna Usova (Ukraine)
12 May 2018
15:00

Poland	0–0	Italy
	Report

Sūduva Stadium, Marijampolė
Referee: Hristiana Guteva (Bulgaria)

15 May 2018
13:00

Spain	5–0	Poland
Navarro 8' (pen.), 34'; Hernández 40'; Esteve 61'; Arana 66'	Report

Alytus Stadium, Alytus
Referee: Désirée Grundbacher (Switzerland)
15 May 2018
13:00

England	4–0	Italy
Salmon 47', 63', 65'; Blanchard 72'	Report

Sūduva Stadium, Marijampolė
Referee: Irena Velevačkoska (Macedonia)

== Knockout stage ==
In the knockout stage, penalty shoot-out is used to decide the winner if necessary (no extra time is played).

=== Bracket ===
Semi-finals
18 May – Alytus
Germany	8
England	0
18 May – Marijampolė
Spain	1
Finland	0

Final
21 May – Marijampolė
Germany	0
Spain	2
World Cup play-off
21 May – Alytus
England	1
Finland	2

=== Semi-finals ===
Winners qualify for 2018 FIFA U-17 Women's World Cup. Losers enter the FIFA U-17 Women's World Cup play-off.

18 May 2018
16:30

Germany	8–0	England
Rendell 23' (o.g.); Martinez 27', 44', 61'; Köster 30', 72'; Fuso 50'; Fudalla 64'	Report

Alytus Stadium, Alytus
Referee: Hristiana Guteva (Bulgaria)

18 May 2018
19:00

Spain	1–0	Finland
Navarro 52'	Report

Sūduva Stadium, Marijampolė
Referee: Lucie Šulcová (Czech Republic)

=== FIFA U-17 Women's World Cup play-off ===
Winner qualifies for 2018 FIFA U-17 Women's World Cup.

21 May 2018
14:00

England	1–2	Finland
Park 12'	Report	Huhta 46'; Kantanen 61'

Alytus Stadium, Alytus
Referee: Frida Nielsen (Denmark)

=== Final ===
21 May 2018
19:00

Germany	0–2	Spain
	Report	Navarro 46', 73'

Sūduva Stadium, Marijampolė
Referee: Désirée Grundbacher (Switzerland)

== Qualified teams for FIFA U-17 Women's World Cup ==
The following three teams from UEFA qualified for the 2018 FIFA U-17 Women's World Cup.

Team	Qualified on	Previous appearances in FIFA U-17 Women's World Cup^{1}
Germany	18 May 2018	5 (2008, 2010, 2012, 2014, 2016)
Spain	18 May 2018	3 (2010, 2014, 2016)
Finland	21 May 2018	0 (debut)

^{1} Bold indicates champions for that year. Italic indicates hosts for that year.

== Goalscorers ==
Note: Goals scored in the FIFA U-17 Women's World Cup play-off are included in this list, but are not counted by UEFA for statistical purposes.

9 goals

- (Germany) Shekiera Martinez

6 goals

- (Spain) Eva Navarro

4 goals

- (England) Ebony Salmon
- (Finland) Annika Huhta (including 1 in play-off)

3 goals

- (Netherlands) Romée Leuchter
- (Netherlands) Kirsten van de Westeringh

2 goals

- (England) Jess Park (including 1 in play-off)
- (Finland) Aino Vuorinen
- (Germany) Vanessa Fudalla
- (Germany) Ivana Fuso
- (Germany) Leonie Köster
- (Germany) Sophie Weidauer
- (Spain) Paula Arana

1 goal

- (England) Annabel Blanchard
- (England) Paris McKenzie
- (Finland) Kaisa Juvonen
- (Finland) Jenni Kantanen (in play-off)
- (Finland) Vilma Koivisto
- (Germany) Gia Corley
- (Germany) Laura Donhauser
- (Netherlands) Dana Foederer
- (Netherlands) Chasity Grant
- (Netherlands) Gwyneth Hendriks
- (Netherlands) Nikita Tromp
- (Netherlands) Jonna van de Velde
- (Poland) Paulina Filipczak
- (Poland) Paulina Tomasiak
- (Spain) Aida Esteve
- (Spain) Paola Hernández

1 own goal

- (England) Kayla Rendell (against Germany)
- (Lithuania) Laura Ubartaitė (against The Netherlands)

Source: UEFA.com

== Team of the tournament ==
The UEFA technical observers selected the following 11 players for the team of the tournament (previously a squad of 18 players were selected):

Goalkeeper

- (Finland) Anna Koivunen

Defenders

- (Spain) Ana Tejada
- (Germany) Greta Stegemann
- (Finland) Nana Yang

Midfielders

- (Spain) Paola Hernández
- (Germany) Ivana Fuso
- (Germany) Vanessa Fudalla
- (England) Jess Park
- (Netherlands) Kirsten van de Westeringh

Forwards

- (Spain) Eva Navarro
- (Germany) Shekiera Martinez
