= Aida Esteve =

Spanish footballer (born 2001)

Personal information
- Full name: Aida Esteve Quintero
- Date of birth: 12 March 2001 (age 25)
- Place of birth: Rubí, Barcelona, Spain
- Height: 1.68 m (5 ft 6 in)
- Position: Midfielder

Youth career
- 2016–2017: Espanyol

Senior career*
Years	Team	Apps	(Gls)
2017–2020	Barcelona B	20+	(4+)
2020–2022	Eibar	48	(5)
2022–2024	Madrid CFF	2	(0)
2024–2025	Valencia CF	27	(1)
2025–2026	Parma	12	(0)

International career^{‡}
2018	Spain U17	1	(1)
2019	Spain U19	3	(0)
2021–2024	Spain U23	8	(3)
2025–	Catalonia	1	(0)
- * Club domestic league appearances and goals as of 21 February 2026 (UTC) ‡ National team caps and goals as of 04:25, 22 December 2023 (UTC)

Aida Esteve Quintero (born 12 March 2001) is a Spanish footballer who plays as a midfielder.

== Club career ==
Esteve started her career at Espanyol's academy.
