= Laura Donhauser =

German footballer

Personal information
- Date of birth: 4 September 2001 (age 25)
- Place of birth: Amberg, Germany
- Height: 1.60 m (5 ft 3 in)
- Position: Midfielder

Team information
- Current team: 1. FC Köln
- Number: 25

Youth career
- –2016: FC Amberg
- 2016–2018: FC Bayern Munich

Senior career*
Years	Team	Apps	(Gls)
2018–2021	FC Bayern Munich II	55	(6)
2020–2021	FC Bayern Munich	0	(0)
2021-	1. FC Köln	93	(1)

International career
2016-2017	Germany U16	8	(1)
2017–2018	Germany U17	17	(0)
2019–2020	Germany U19	19	(0)
- * Club domestic league appearances and goals as of 21 November 2026

Laura Donhauser (born 4 September 2001) is a German professional footballer who plays as a midfielder for Frauen-Bundesliga club 1. FC Köln.

== Club career ==
Laura Donhauser began her career in the youth ranks at FC Amberg. At the age of 15, she joined the youth academy of FC Bayern Munich. In the 2018–19 season, she was promoted to the club's reserve team. She played 55 league matches for them in the 2. Bundesliga until the end of the 2020–21 season, scoring six goals. She made her senior debut on 26 August 2018 (matchday 2) in a 3–2 away defeat against VfL Wolfsburg's reserve team. She scored her first goal against the same team in the return leg on 17 February 2019 (matchday 15), netting the winning goal in the 87th minute to secure a 2–1 victory. She also made two appearances for the first team in the UEFA Champions League. On 16 December 2020, she made her first appearance in the second leg of the first round of the UEFA Champions League, a 3–0 victory over Ajax Amsterdam, coming on as a substitute for Carolin Simon in the 71st minute. She made another appearance in the second leg of the round of 16, a 3–0 win over BIIK Kazygurt, coming on as a substitute for Gia Corley in the 81st minute.

For the 2021–22 season, she was signed by newly promoted Bundesliga side 1. FC Köln. She made her competitive debut for them on 26 September 2021 in the second round of the DFB-Pokal Frauen against Arminia Bielefeld. Her Bundesliga debut came on 1 October 2021, in a 6–0 home defeat against her former club Bayern Munich.

== International career ==
Laura Donhauser made her debut for the Germany under-16 national team national team on 1 November 2016, in Flensburg, playing in a 4–0 victory against Denmark's U16 team. With the Germany under-17 national team, she participated in the European Championship 2018 held in Lithuania, playing in all Group A matches as well as the final, which they lost 2–0 to Spain. She also represented the U17 national team at the World Cup 2018 in Uruguay, playing in all three Group C matches and in the quarter-final, which they lost 1–0 to Canada. With the Germany under-19 national team, she participated in the European Championship in Scotland, playing in the first two group stage matches, the semi-final, and the final, which they lost 2–1 to France.

== Career statistics ==
As of match played 21 November 2026:

Appearances and goals by club, season and competition
Club	Season	League			DFB-Pokal		Continental		Other		Total	
Club	Season	Division	Apps	Goals	Apps	Goals	Apps	Goals	Apps	Goals	Apps	Goals
Bayern Munich II	2018–19	2. Frauen-Bundesliga	24	4	—		—		—		24	4
Bayern Munich II	2019–20	2. Frauen-Bundesliga	16	3	—		—		—		16	3
Bayern Munich II	2020–21	2. Frauen-Bundesliga	15	0	—		—		—		15	0
Bayern Munich II	Total		55	7	—		—		—		55	7
Bayern Munich	2020–21	Frauen-Bundesliga	0	0	0	0	2 (Note: Appearances in UEFA Women's Champions League)	0	—		2	0
1. FC Köln	2021–22	Frauen-Bundesliga	15	1	2	0	—		—		17	1
1. FC Köln	2022–23	Frauen-Bundesliga	19	0	2	0	—		—		21	0
1. FC Köln	2023–24	Frauen-Bundesliga	13	0	1	0	—		—		14	0
1. FC Köln	2024–25	Frauen-Bundesliga	19	0	—		—		—		19	0
1. FC Köln	2025–26	Frauen-Bundesliga	19	1	1	0	—		—		20	1
1. FC Köln	2026–27	Frauen-Bundesliga	8	0	2	0	—		—		10	0
1. FC Köln	Total		93	2	8	0	—		—		101	2
Career Total			148	9	8	0	2	0	0	0	158	9
