= Dana Foederer =

Dutch footballer (born 2002)

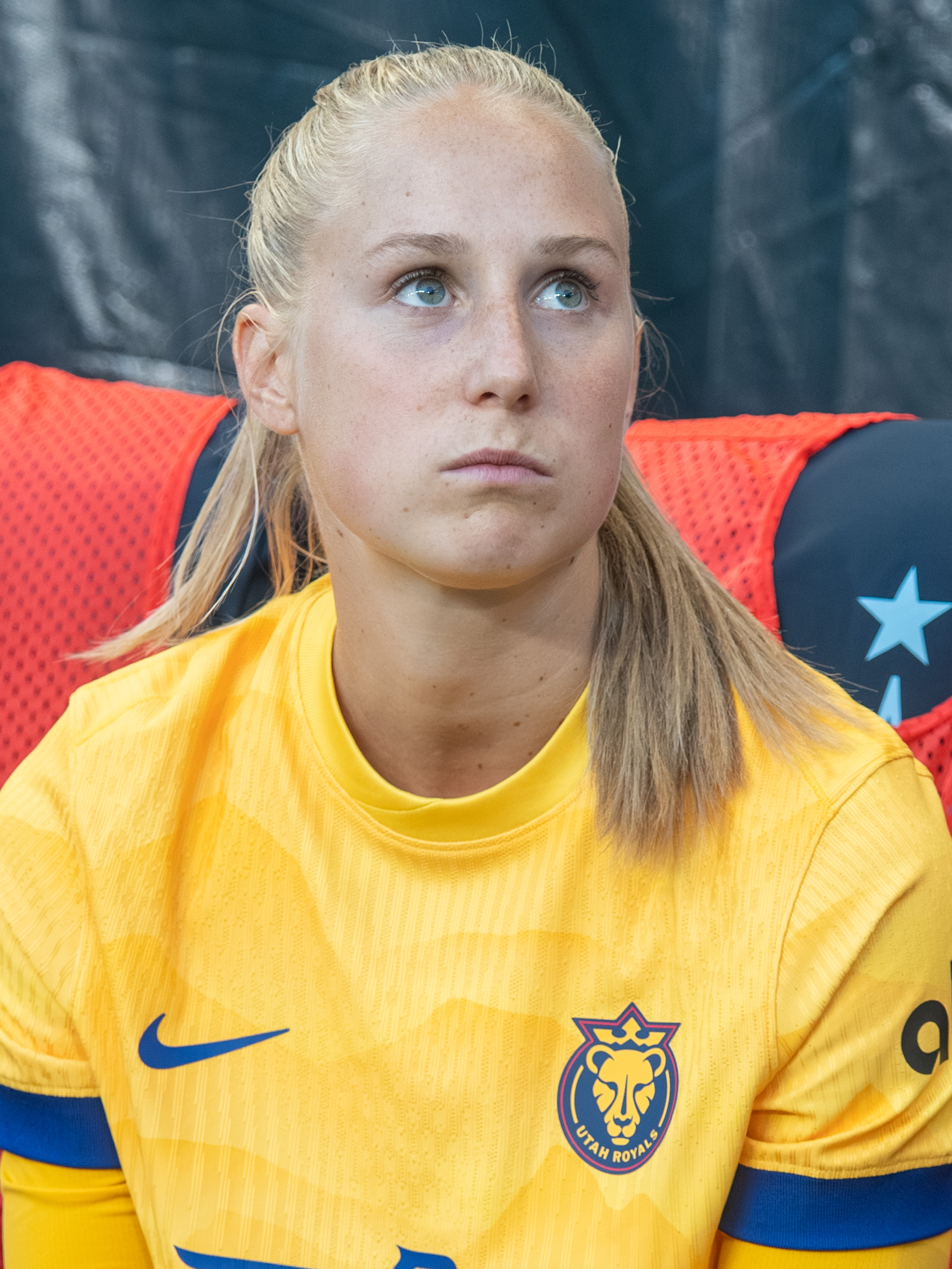
- Foederer with the Utah Royals in 2025

Personal information
- Full name: Dana Margaretha Wilhelmina Foederer
- Date of birth: 27 July 2002 (age 24)
- Place of birth: Veldhoven, Netherlands
- Height: 1.68 m (5 ft 6 in)
- Position: Midfielder

Team information
- Current team: Galatasaray
- Number: 27

Youth career
- CTO Zuid

Senior career*
Years	Team	Apps	(Gls)
2019–2021	PSV	6	(1)
2021–2022	Heerenveen	23	(1)
2022–2024	Fortuna Sittard	29	(2)
2024–2025	Utah Royals	47	(1)
2026–	Galatasaray	4	(0)

International career^{‡}
2017	Netherlands U15	3	(0)
2018	Netherlands U16	3	(0)
2018–2019	Netherlands U17	20	(4)
2020	Netherlands U18	3	(0)
2019–2020	Netherlands U19	8	(1)
2022	Netherlands U20	10	(1)
2022–	Netherlands U23	8	(1)
Medal record
Women's football
Representing Netherlands
UEFA Women's Under-17 Championship
Runner-up	2019 Bulgaria
- * Club domestic league appearances and goals as of 2 November 2025 ‡ National team caps and goals as of 28 October 2024

Dana Margaretha Wilhelmina Foederer (born 27 July 2002) is a Dutch professional footballer who plays as a midfielder for Turkish Super League club Galatasaray. She previously played for PSV, Heerenveen, and Fortuna Sittard in the Eredivisie and the Utah Royals of the National Women's Soccer League (NWSL).

== Club career ==
=== PSV ===
On 28 February 2019, it was announced that Foederer would join PSV on 1 July. She made her league debut against PEC Zwolle on 6 September 2019. Foederer scored her first league goal against Excelsior on 14 February 2020, scoring in the 90th+1st minute. She made her UEFA Champions League debut against FC Barcelona.

=== Heerenveen ===
On 24 May 2021, it was announced that Foederer would join Heerenveen. She made her league debut against Feyenoord on 3 September 2021. Foederer scored her first league goal against VV Alkmaar on 11 March 2022, scoring in the 58th minute.

=== Fortuna Sittard ===
On 15 June 2022, it was announced that Foederer joined Fortuna Sittard. She made her league debut against Feyenoord on 25 September 2022. Foederer scored her first league goal against Heerenveen on 28 October 2022, scoring in the 60th minute.

=== Utah Royals ===
On 5 Jan 2024, Foederer was announced at the Utah Royals. She made her league debut against Chicago Red Stars on 16 March 2024. Foederer scored her first league goal against Angel City on 4 May 2024, scoring in the 51st minute.

=== Galatasaray ===
In January 2026, Foederer signed for Turkish Super League club Galatasaray.

== International career ==
Foederer scored a long ranged effort that helped her to be awarded Player of the Match against USA Under 20s.

== Style of play ==
Foederer considers herself a technical player who likes to keep possession.

== Personal life ==
Foederer studied Applied Psychology at NTI. Her brother Nick Foederer is also a footballer.

== Honours ==
Individual

- UEFA Women's Under-17 Championship team of the tournament: 2019
