= Eva Navarro (footballer) =

Spanish footballer

- Navarro with Spain in 2026

Personal information
- Full name: Eva María Navarro García
- Date of birth: 27 January 2001 (age 25)
- Place of birth: Yecla, Spain
- Height: 1.61 m (5 ft 3 in)
- Positions: Defender; forward

Team information
- Current team: Real Madrid
- Number: 19

Youth career
- Hispania Yecla (futsal)
- Pinoso

Senior career*
Years	Team	Apps	(Gls)
2015–2018	Sporting Plaza Argel		
2018–2022	Levante	66	(12)
2022–2024	Atlético de Madrid	47	(12)
2024–	Real Madrid	50	(4)

International career^{‡}
- Spain U16
2016–2018	Spain U17	24	(12)
2018	Spain U20	6	(0)
2019	Spain U19	10	(6)
2021	Spain U23	1	(0)
2019–	Spain	33	(7)
Medal record
Women's football
Representing Spain
FIFA Women's World Cup
Winner	2023 Australia–New Zealand
UEFA Women's Nations League
Winner	2024 France–Netherlands–Spain
FIFA U-20 Women's World Cup
Runner-up	2018 France
FIFA U-17 Women's World Cup
Winner	2018 Uruguay
Third place	2016 Jordan
UEFA Women's Under-17 Championship
Winner	2018 Lithuania
Runner-up	2016 Belarus
Runner-up	2017 Czech Republic
- * Club domestic league appearances and goals as of 19:55, 31 August 2026 (UTC) ‡ National team caps and goals as of 16:24, 10 October 2026 (UTC)

Eva María Navarro García (born 27 January 2001) is a Spanish professional footballer who plays as a defender or forward for Liga F club Real Madrid and the Spain women's national team.

== Club career ==
=== Early years ===
Navarro began playing futsal with local club Hispania Yecla before moving to play club football for Pinoso in nearby Alicante. In 2015, Navarro signed with Sporting Plaza de Argel, debuting in the Segunda División. While with the club, Navarro helped reach the promotion play-offs in 2016–17 and 2017–18.

=== Levante UD ===
On 26 June 2018, Navarro signed for Primera División club Levante UD. On 9 September 2018, she made her debut for the club as a 61st-minute substitute in the season opener, a 1–0 win over Rayo Vallecano. On 22 December 2018, she scored her first goal for Levante in a 4–2 defeat to Logroño.

Her contract expired in June 2020. However, Navarro was one of 17 players in a class action lawsuit against the Association of Women's Football Clubs (ACFF) and the Association of Spanish Football Players (AFE) disputing the use of the Compensation List that would unrealistically inflate the fee necessary for other Primera División to sign allocated players as free agents. Navarro's compensation was set at €500,000, pricing any Spanish club out of signing her as a free agent. While teammate Ona Batlle opted to move abroad for free in July, Navarro wanted to remain in Spain. In August 2020, she elected to sign a one-year extension at Levante. In March 2021, Navarro underwent surgery on a season-ending cruciate ligament injury in her left knee. Having returned as a 68th-minute substitute on 31 October 2021 in a league game against Sporting de Huelva, Navarro made seven appearances before tearing the same cruciate ligament in a match on 19 December 2021. She did not return during the season and, on 9 June 2022, announced she was leaving following the expiration of her contract.

=== Atlético de Madrid ===
On 7 July 2022, Navarro signed a one-year contract with Atlético de Madrid. She made her debut in December 2022 having recovered from injury, and in May 2023 she appeared in the 2023 Copa de la Reina final (and scored in the penalty shootout) as Atléti claimed the trophy. On 17 June 2024, her departure from the club was announced.

=== Real Madrid ===
On 6 July 2024, Navarro signed with Real Madrid. Navarro quickly became an important player for the club, making 71 appearances and scoring four goals in all competitions during her first two seasons. A versatile player, she is capable of playing as either a right-back or a right winger.

== International career ==
=== Youth ===
Navarro represented Spain at under-17, under-19 and under-20 level including at six major youth tournaments: three UEFA Women's Under-17 Championship editions (2016, 2017 and 2018), two FIFA U-17 Women's World Cup editions (2016 and 2018), the 2019 UEFA Women's Under-19 Championship and the 2018 FIFA U-20 Women's World Cup.

On 21 May 2018, Navarro scored both goals in a 2–0 win over Germany in the 2018 UEFA Women's Under-17 Championship final. She finished as the second highest scorer with 6 goals and was named to the team of the tournament. In August, Navarro was called up to the 2018 FIFA U-20 Women's World Cup squad as a 17-year-old, playing in all six games as Spain lost in the final to Japan. In December 2018, Navarro returned to the under-17 side to compete at her third major tournament of the year, traveling to Uruguay for the 2018 FIFA U-17 Women's World Cup. Navarro scored two goals during the group stage on the way to helping Spain win the tournament, beating Mexico 2–1 in the final.

=== Senior ===
On 17 May 2019, Navarro made her senior debut in a 4–0 friendly victory over Cameroon, appearing as a 74th-minute substitute for Esther González. She scored her first senior goal on 27 November 2020 in a 10–0 UEFA Women's Euro 2022 qualifying victory over Moldova.

== Career statistics ==
=== Club ===
As of match played 15 June 2024

Appearances and goals by club, season and competition
Club	Season	League			Copa de la Reina		Continental		Other		Total	
Club	Season	Division	Apps	Goals	Apps	Goals	Apps	Goals	Apps	Goals	Apps	Goals
Levante	2018–19	Primera División	22	1	1	0	—		0	0	23	1
Levante	2019–20	Primera División	20	8	1	0	—		1 (Note: Appearance(s) in Supercopa de España)	0	22	8
Levante	2020–21	Primera División	17	3	0	0	—		2	1	19	4
Levante	2021–22	Primera División	7	0	0	0	0	0	0	0	7	0
Levante	Total		66	12	2	0	0	0	3	1	70	13
Atlético de Madrid	2022–23	Liga F	19	6	4	1	—		—		23	7
Atlético de Madrid	2023–24	Liga F	28	6	3	1	—		1	0	32	7
Atlético de Madrid	Total		47	12	7	2	0	0	1	0	55	14
Career total			113	24	9	2	0	0	4	1	126	27

=== International ===
As of match played 6 August 2024

Appearances and goals by national team and year
National team	Year	Apps	Goals
Spain	2019	2	0
Spain	2020	1	1
Spain	2021	2	1
Spain	2022	0	0
Spain	2023	12	3
Spain	2024	9	0
Total		26	5

As of match played 31 July 2024

Spain score listed first, score column indicates score after each Navarro goal.

No.	Date	Venue	Opponent	Score	Result	Competition
1	27 November 2020	La Ciudad del Fútbol, Las Rozas, Spain	Moldova	9–0	10–0	UEFA Women's Euro 2022 qualifying
2	18 February 2021	ASK Arena, Baku, Azerbaijan	Azerbaijan	9–0	13–0	UEFA Women's Euro 2022 qualifying
3	4 April 2023	Estadi Municipal de Can Misses, Ibiza, Sweden	China	3–0	3–0	Friendly
4	29 June 2023	Estadio Román Suárez Puerta, Avilés, Spain	Panama	5–0	7–0	Friendly
5	22 September 2023	Gamla Ullevi, Gothenburg, Sweden	Sweden	2–1	3–2	2023-24 UEFA Women's Nations League
6	18 April 2026	Estadio Nuevo Arcángel, Córdoba, Spain	Ukraine	4–0	5–0	2027 FIFA Women's World Cup qualification
7	10 October 2026	Audi Field, Washington, D.C., United States	United States	2–0	2–0	Friendly

== Honours ==
Atlético de Madrid

- Copa de la Reina: 2022–23

Spain U17

- UEFA Women's Under-17 Championship: 2018
- FIFA U-17 Women's World Cup: 2018

Spain U20

- FIFA U-20 Women's World Cup runner-up: 2018

Spain

- FIFA Women's World Cup: 2023
- UEFA Women's Nations League: 2023–24

Individual

- UEFA Women's Under-17 Championship Team of the Tournament: 2018
