= 2018 FIFA U-17 Women's World Cup =

Copa Mundial Femenina Sub-17 de la FIFA Uruguay 2018

Tournament details
- Host country: Uruguay
- Dates: 13 November – 1 December
- Teams: 16 (from 6 confederations)
- Venues: 3 (in 3 host cities)

Final positions
- Champions: Spain (1st title)
- Runners-up: Mexico
- Third place: New Zealand
- Fourth place: Canada

Tournament statistics
- Matches played: 32
- Goals scored: 86 (2.69 per match)
- Attendance: 38,272 (1,196 per match)
- Top scorer(s): (Ghana) Mukarama Abdulai (Spain) Clàudia Pina (7 goals each)
- Best player: (Spain) Clàudia Pina
- Best goalkeeper: (Spain) Catalina Coll
- Fair play award: Japan

The 2018 FIFA U-17 Women's World Cup was the sixth edition of the FIFA U-17 Women's World Cup, the biennial international women's youth football championship contested by the under-17 national teams of the member associations of FIFA, since its inception in 2008.

The tournament was held in Uruguay from 13 November to 1 December 2018. North Korea were the defending champions but were eliminated by Spain in the quarter-finals.

The final took place at the Estadio Charrúa, Montevideo between Spain and Mexico a rematch from the group stage in 2016. Spain won their first title, beating Mexico 2–1.

== Host selection ==
On 6 March 2014, FIFA announced that bidding had begun for the 2018 FIFA U-17 Women's World Cup. Member associations interested in hosting must submit a declaration of interest by 15 April 2014, and provide the complete set of bidding documents by 31 October 2014.

The following countries made official bids for hosting the tournament:

- Bosnia and Herzegovina
- Egypt
- Finland
- Northern Ireland
- Sweden

The decision on the hosts was originally to be made at the FIFA Executive Committee meeting on 19–20 March 2015, but no announcement was made after the meeting.

During FIFA president Gianni Infantino's visit to Uruguay in March 2016, Uruguay showed interest in organizing the event. The FIFA Council appointed Uruguay as host on 10 May 2016. This was the first FIFA tournament held in the country since the first men's World Cup in 1930, the first FIFA women's event held in Uruguay and the first FIFA U-17 Women's World Cup ever held in South America.

== Qualified teams ==
A total of 16 teams qualify for the final tournament. In addition to Uruguay who qualified automatically as hosts, the other 15 teams qualify from six separate continental competitions. The slot allocation was approved by the FIFA Council on 13–14 October 2016.

Confederation	Qualifying tournament	Team	Appearance	Last appearance	Previous best performance
AFC (Asia)	2017 AFC U-16 Women's Championship	Japan	6th	2016	Champions (2014)
AFC (Asia)	2017 AFC U-16 Women's Championship	North Korea	6th	2016	Champions (2008, 2016)
AFC (Asia)	2017 AFC U-16 Women's Championship	South Korea	3rd	2010	Champions (2010)
CAF (Africa)	2018 African U-17 Women's World Cup Qualifying Tournament	Cameroon	2nd	2016	Group stage (2016)
CAF (Africa)	2018 African U-17 Women's World Cup Qualifying Tournament	Ghana	6th	2016	Third place (2012)
CAF (Africa)	2018 African U-17 Women's World Cup Qualifying Tournament	South Africa	2nd	2010	Group stage (2010)
CONCACAF (North, Central America & Caribbean)	2018 CONCACAF Women's U-17 Championship	Canada	6th	2016	Quarter-Finals (2008, 2012, 2014)
CONCACAF (North, Central America & Caribbean)	2018 CONCACAF Women's U-17 Championship	Mexico	5th	2016	Quarter-finals (2014, 2016)
CONCACAF (North, Central America & Caribbean)	2018 CONCACAF Women's U-17 Championship	United States	4th	2016	Runners-up (2008)
CONMEBOL (South America)	Host nation	Uruguay	2nd	2012	Group stage (2012)
CONMEBOL (South America)	2018 South American U-17 Women's Championship	Brazil	5th	2016	Quarter-finals (2010, 2012)
CONMEBOL (South America)	2018 South American U-17 Women's Championship	Colombia	4th	2014	Group stage (2008, 2012, 2014)
OFC (Oceania)	2017 OFC U-16 Women's Championship	New Zealand	6th	2016	Group stage (2008, 2010, 2012, 2014, 2016)
UEFA (Europe)	2018 UEFA Women's Under-17 Championship	Finland	1st	None	Debut
UEFA (Europe)	2018 UEFA Women's Under-17 Championship	Germany	6th	2016	Third place (2008)
UEFA (Europe)	2018 UEFA Women's Under-17 Championship	Spain	4th	2016	Runners-up (2014)

== Venues ==
Colonia del Sacramento	Maldonado	Montevideo
Estadio Profesor Alberto Suppici	Estadio Domingo Burgueño (Estadio Domingo Burgueño Miguel)	Estadio Charrúa
34°28′01″S 57°50′43″W	34°54′52″S 54°57′19″W	34°52′42″S 56°05′22″W
Capacity: 6,500	Capacity: 22,000	Capacity: 14,000
Location of the host cities of the 2018 FIFA U-17 Women's World Cup.

== Branding ==
The emblem was launched on 16 November 2017 at the Palacio Legislativo in Montevideo. The emblem is inspired by the famous beach coastline and its shape of the tournament's trophy. It features the Uruguayan flower ceibo, the Candombe drummer and the sun from the national flag.

== Mascot ==
The mascot named Capi was unveiled on 7 June 2018, she is inspired by a Uruguayan capybara.

== Slogan ==
The slogan "Same Game, Same Emotion" was unveiled on 29 September 2018.

== Draw ==
The official draw was held on 30 May 2018, 15:00 CEST (UTC+2), at the FIFA Headquarters in Zürich. The teams were seeded based on their performances in previous U-17 Women's World Cups and confederation tournaments, with the hosts Uruguay automatically seeded and assigned to position A1. Teams of the same confederation could not meet in the group stage.

The identity of the three teams from CONCACAF were not known at the time of the draw, and were seeded based on the rankings of the three best-performing teams from the region in previous editions. They were assigned to the three places reserved for CONCACAF after the qualifying tournament was completed based on their rankings in the seeding formula (instead of their rankings in the qualifying tournament).

Pot 1	Pot 2	Pot 3	Pot 4
Uruguay; Japan; North Korea; Spain	Germany; Ghana; Mexico; Canada	Brazil; New Zealand; United States; South Korea	Colombia; South Africa; Cameroon; Finland

== Match officials ==
A total of 15 referees and 28 assistant referees were appointed by FIFA for the tournament.

Confederation	Referees	Assistant referees
AFC	(Australia) Casey Reibelt (Japan) Yoshimi Yamashita	(Japan) Makoto Bozono (South Korea) Lee Seul-gi (Japan) Naomi Teshirogi (Vietnam) Truong Thi Le Trinh
CAF	(Rwanda) Salima Mukansanga	(Burkina Faso) Bielignin Some (Mali) Fanta Idrissa Kone
CONCACAF	(Canada) Marie-Soleil Beaudoin (United States) Ekaterina Koroleva (Mexico) Lucila Venegas	(Mexico) Mayte Chavez (Mexico) Enedina Caudillo (Jamaica) Princess Brown (United States) Felisha Mariscal (United States) Deleana Quan (Jamaica) Stephanie-Dale Yee Sing
CONMEBOL	(Argentina) Laura Fortunato (Chile) Maria Carvajal (Paraguay) Olga Miranda	(Colombia) Mary Cristina Blanco Bolivar (Argentina) Mariana De Almeida (Paraguay) Nilda Gamarra (Argentina) Maria Rocco (Chile) Loreto Toloza Sacilotti (Chile) Leslie Vasquez
OFC	(Fiji) Finau Vulivuli	(New Zealand) Sarah Jones
UEFA	(Germany) Riem Hussein (Hungary) Katalin Kulcsár (Poland) Monika Mularczyk (Sweden) Sara Persson (Russia) Anastasia Pustovoytova	(Netherlands) Nicolet Bakker (Ukraine) Oleksandra Ardasheva (Sweden) Julia Magnusson (Spain) Rocio Puento Pino (Russia) Ekaterina Kurochkina (Scotland) Kylie McMullan (England) Lisa Rashid (Czech Republic) Lucie Ratajová (Slovakia) Maria Sukenikova (Romania) Mihaela Tepusa (Hungary) Katalin Török

== Squads ==
Players born between 1 January 2001 and 31 December 2003 are eligible to compete in the tournament. Each team has to name a preliminary squad of 35 players. From the preliminary squad, the team has to name a final squad of 21 players (three of whom must be goalkeepers) by the FIFA deadline. Players in the final squad can be replaced due to serious injury up to 24 hours prior to kickoff of the team's first match.

== Group stage ==
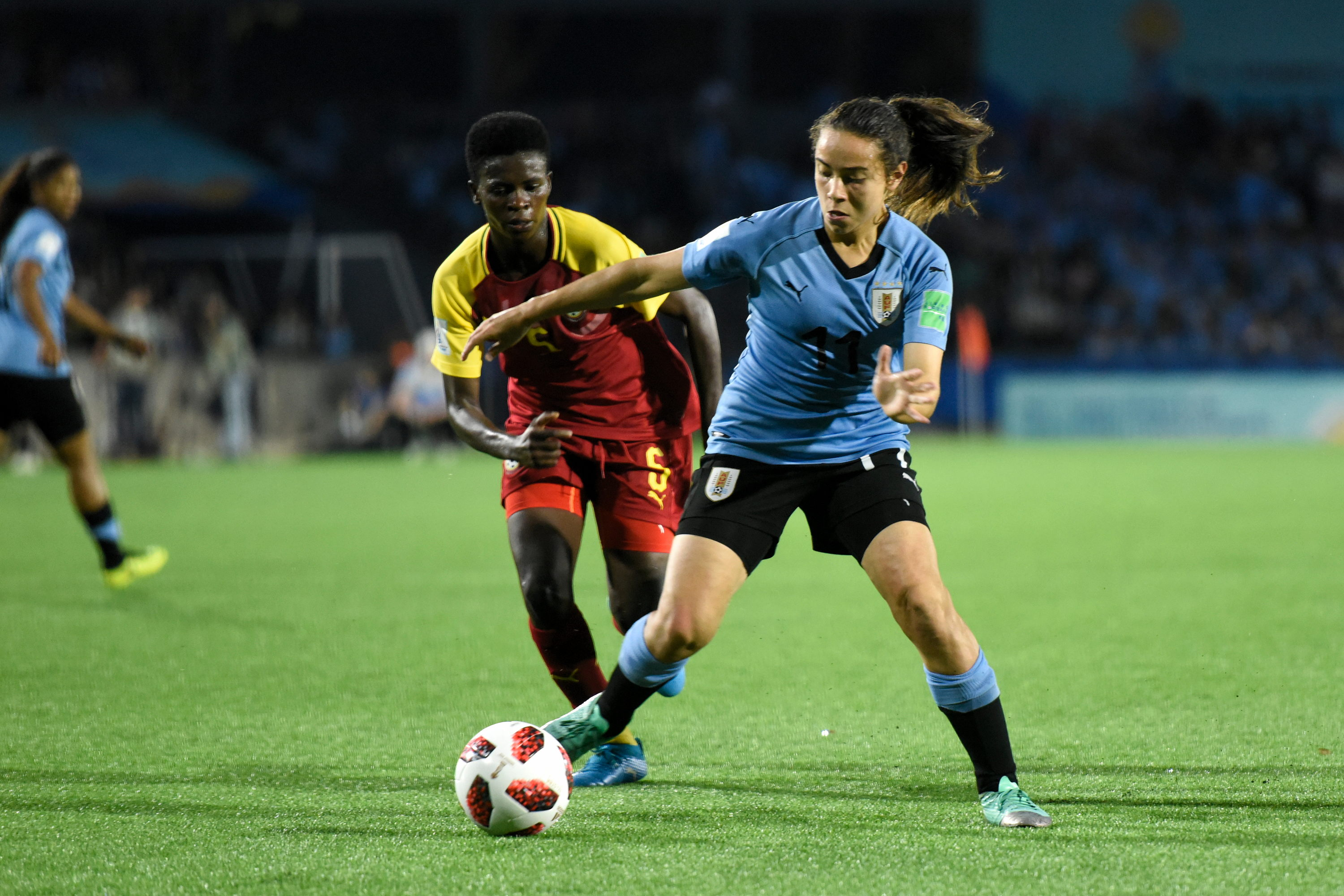
Uruguay vs Ghana match

The official schedule was unveiled on 8 February 2018.

The top two teams of each group advance to the quarter-finals. The rankings of teams in each group are determined as follows (regulations Article 17.7):

1. points obtained in all group matches;
2. goal difference in all group matches;
3. number of goals scored in all group matches;

If two or more teams are equal on the basis of the above three criteria, their rankings are determined as follows:

4. points obtained in the group matches between the teams concerned;
5. goal difference in the group matches between the teams concerned;
6. number of goals scored in the group matches between the teams concerned;
7. fair play points in all group matches:
  - first yellow card: minus 1 point;
  - indirect red card (second yellow card): minus 3 points;
  - direct red card: minus 4 points;
  - yellow card and direct red card: minus 5 points;
8. drawing of lots by the FIFA Organising Committee.

All times are local, UYT (UTC−3).

=== Group A ===
Pos	Team	Pld	W	D	L	GF	GA	GD	Pts	Qualification
1	Ghana	3	3	0	0	10	1	+9	9	Knockout stage
2	New Zealand	3	2	0	1	3	3	0	6	Knockout stage
3	Finland	3	0	1	2	2	5	−3	1	
4	Uruguay (H)	3	0	1	2	2	8	−6	1	

Source: FIFA
Rules for classification: Group stage tiebreakers
(H) Hosts
13 November 2018
16:00

New Zealand	1–0	Finland
Brown 41'	Report

Estadio Charrúa, Montevideo
Attendance: 1,385
Referee: Yoshimi Yamashita (Japan)
13 November 2018
19:00

Uruguay	0–5	Ghana
	Report	Mumuni 20'; Abdulai 25', 78', 90+1'; Pokuaa 66'

Estadio Charrúa, Montevideo
Attendance: 9,657
Referee: Lucila Venegas (Mexico)

16 November 2018
16:00

Finland	1–3	Ghana
Kantanen 75'	Report	Pokuaa 6'; Abdulai 13'; Animah 86'

Estadio Charrúa, Montevideo
Attendance: 858
Referee: Laura Fortunato (Argentina)
16 November 2018
19:00

Uruguay	1–2	New Zealand
Aquino 8'	Report	Wisnewski 26'; Brown 36'

Estadio Charrúa, Montevideo
Attendance: 4,619
Referee: Salima Mukansanga (Rwanda)

20 November 2018
17:00

Finland	1–1	Uruguay
Vuorinen 51'	Report	Pizarro 79'

Estadio Domingo Burgueño Miguel, Maldonado
Attendance: 2,093
Referee: Casey Reibelt (Australia)
20 November 2018
17:00

Ghana	2–0	New Zealand
Abdulai 61', 89'	Report

Estadio Charrúa, Montevideo
Attendance: 359
Referee: Sara Persson (Sweden)

=== Group B ===
Pos	Team	Pld	W	D	L	GF	GA	GD	Pts	Qualification
1	Japan	3	1	2	0	7	1	+6	5	Knockout stage
2	Mexico	3	1	2	0	2	1	+1	5	Knockout stage
3	Brazil	3	1	1	1	4	2	+2	4	
4	South Africa	3	0	1	2	1	10	−9	1	

Source: FIFA
Rules for classification: Group stage tiebreakers
13 November 2018
14:00

Brazil	0–0	Japan
	Report

Estadio Domingo Burgueño Miguel, Maldonado
Attendance: 412
Referee: Katalin Kulcsár (Hungary)
13 November 2018
17:00

Mexico	0–0	South Africa
	Report

Estadio Domingo Burgueño Miguel, Maldonado
Attendance: 592
Referee: Maria Carvajal (Chile)

16 November 2018
14:00

Japan	6–0	South Africa
Osawa 4', 23'; Tanaka 37' (pen.); S. Ito 41', 55' (pen.); Yamamoto 90+1'	Report

Estadio Domingo Burgueño Miguel, Maldonado
Attendance: 392
Referee: Marie-Soleil Beaudoin (Canada)
16 November 2018
17:00

Mexico	1–0	Brazil
Buso 43'	Report

Estadio Domingo Burgueño Miguel, Maldonado
Attendance: 677
Referee: Sara Persson (Sweden)

20 November 2018
14:00

Japan	1–1	Mexico
Kinoshita 40'	Report	González 63'

Estadio Domingo Burgueño Miguel, Maldonado
Attendance: 572
Referee: Salima Mukansanga (Rwanda)
20 November 2018
14:00

South Africa	1–4	Brazil
Vilakazi 53'	Report	Jheniffer 50'; Júlia 51' (pen.); Amanda 54'; Maria Eduarda 60'

Estadio Charrúa, Montevideo
Attendance: 188
Referee: Riem Hussein (Germany)

=== Group C ===
Pos	Team	Pld	W	D	L	GF	GA	GD	Pts	Qualification
1	Germany	3	2	0	1	8	2	+6	6	Knockout stage
2	North Korea	3	2	0	1	6	5	+1	6	Knockout stage
3	Cameroon	3	1	0	2	2	5	−3	3	
4	United States	3	1	0	2	3	7	−4	3	

Source: FIFA
Rules for classification: Group stage tiebreakers
14 November 2018
14:00

United States	3–0	Cameroon
Fishel 22'; Fontes 45+5' (pen.), 81'	Report

Estadio Profesor Alberto Suppici, Colonia del Sacramento
Attendance: 593
Referee: Casey Reibelt (Australia)
14 November 2018
17:00

North Korea	1–4	Germany
Yun Ji-hwa 69'	Report	Blümel 14'; Corley 35', 70'; Weidauer 84'

Estadio Profesor Alberto Suppici, Colonia del Sacramento
Attendance: 743
Referee: Anastasia Pustovoytova (Russia)

17 November 2018
14:00

United States	0–3	North Korea
	Report	Ri Kum-hyang 25'; Kim Yun-ok 32'; Kim Kyong-yong 52'

Estadio Profesor Alberto Suppici, Colonia del Sacramento
Attendance: 573
Referee: Katalin Kulcsár (Hungary)
17 November 2018
17:00

Germany	0–1	Cameroon
	Report	Kameni 54'

Estadio Profesor Alberto Suppici, Colonia del Sacramento
Attendance: 1,227
Referee: Lucila Venegas (Mexico)

21 November 2018
17:00

Germany	4–0	United States
Fudalla 4'; Martinez 32', 65'; Donhauser 89'	Report

Estadio Charrúa, Montevideo
Attendance: 518
Referee: Laura Fortunato (Argentina)
21 November 2018
17:00

Cameroon	1–2	North Korea
Kameni 6'	Report	Ko Kyong-hui 45'; Ri Su-jong 75'

Estadio Profesor Alberto Suppici, Colonia del Sacramento
Attendance: 527
Referee: Marie-Soleil Beaudoin (Canada)

=== Group D ===
Pos	Team	Pld	W	D	L	GF	GA	GD	Pts	Qualification
1	Spain	3	2	1	0	10	1	+9	7	Knockout stage
2	Canada	3	2	0	1	5	5	0	6	Knockout stage
3	Colombia	3	0	2	1	2	5	−3	2	
4	South Korea	3	0	1	2	1	7	−6	1	

Source: FIFA
Rules for classification: Group stage tiebreakers
14 November 2018
16:00

South Korea	0–4	Spain
	Report	Navarro 17'; Pina 51', 65'; Hernández 59'

Estadio Charrúa, Montevideo
Attendance: 259
Referee: Ekaterina Koroleva (United States)
14 November 2018
19:00

Canada	3–0	Colombia
Huitema 77'; Williams 88'; De Filippo 90+4'	Report

Estadio Charrúa, Montevideo
Attendance: 249
Referee: Riem Hussein (Germany)

17 November 2018
16:00

South Korea	0–2	Canada
	Report	Huitema 59'; Kazandjian 74'

Estadio Charrúa, Montevideo
Attendance: 329
Referee: Maria Carvajal (Chile)
17 November 2018
19:00

Colombia	1–1	Spain
Robledo 53'	Report	Okoye 52'

Estadio Charrúa, Montevideo
Attendance: 448
Referee: Yoshimi Yamashita (Japan)

21 November 2018
14:00

Colombia	1–1	South Korea
Robledo 90+1'	Report	Cho Mi-jin 14' (pen.)

Estadio Profesor Alberto Suppici, Colonia del Sacramento
Attendance: 472
Referee: Sandra Braz (Portugal)
21 November 2018
14:00

Spain	5–0	Canada
Paralluelo 9'; I. López 22', 50'; Pina 25'; Navarro 71'	Report

Estadio Charrúa, Montevideo
Attendance: 369
Referee: Anastasia Pustovoytova (Russia)

== Knockout stage ==
In the knockout stages, if a match was level at the end of normal playing time, a penalty shoot-out was used to determine the winner (no extra time was played).

=== Bracket ===
Quarter-finals
24 November – Colonia del S.
Japan	1 (3)
New Zealand (p)	1 (4)
24 November – Colonia del S.
Spain (p)	1 (3)
North Korea	1 (1)
25 November – Montevideo
Ghana	2 (2)
Mexico (p)	2 (4)
25 November – Montevideo
Germany	0
Canada	1

Semi-finals
28 November – Montevideo
New Zealand	0
Spain	2
28 November – Montevideo
Mexico	1
Canada	0

Final
1 December – Montevideo
Spain	2
Mexico	1
Third place
1 December – Montevideo
New Zealand	2
Canada	1

=== Quarter-finals ===
24 November 2018
14:00

Spain	1–1	North Korea
Pina 72'	Report	Kim Kyong-yong 74'
Penalties
Hernández (penalty scored); I. López (penalty missed); Navarro (penalty scored); Nevado (penalty scored)	3–1	(penalty missed) Kim Yun-ok; (penalty missed) Ri Su-gyong; (penalty scored) Ri Sin-ok; (penalty missed) Choe Kum-ok

Estadio Profesor Alberto Suppici, Colonia del Sacramento
Attendance: 675
Referee: Katalin Kulcsár (Hungary)

24 November 2018
17:00

Japan	1–1	New Zealand
Mackay-Wright 31' (o.g.)	Report	Abbott 17'
Penalties
Matsuda (penalty missed); Kinoshita (penalty scored); Tomioka (penalty missed); Kamiya (penalty scored); Yoshizumi (penalty scored)	3–4	(penalty scored) Hahn; (penalty scored) Wisnewski; (penalty scored) Brown; (penalty missed) Stewart; (penalty scored) Leat

Estadio Profesor Alberto Suppici, Colonia del Sacramento
Attendance: 477
Referee: Ekaterina Koroleva (United States)

25 November 2018
16:00

Ghana	2–2	Mexico
Abdulai 46'; Teye 75'	Report	Pérez 61' (pen.), 82'
Penalties
Abdulai (penalty scored); Tweneboaa (penalty missed); Teye (penalty scored); Oppong (penalty missed)	2–4	(penalty scored) Pérez; (penalty scored) Flores; (penalty scored) Mauleón; (penalty scored) Peralta

Estadio Charrúa, Montevideo
Attendance: 477
Referee: Maria Carvajal (Chile)

25 November 2018
19:00

Germany	0–1	Canada
	Report	Huitema 83'

Estadio Charrúa, Montevideo
Attendance: 719
Referee: Salima Mukansanga (Rwanda)

=== Semi-finals ===
28 November 2018
16:00

New Zealand	0–2	Spain
	Report	Pina 39'; I. López 48'

Estadio Charrúa, Montevideo
Attendance: 369
Referee: Yoshimi Yamashita (Japan)

28 November 2018
19:00

Mexico	1–0	Canada
Pérez 25' (pen.)	Report

Estadio Charrúa, Montevideo
Attendance: 628
Referee: Anastasia Pustovoytova (Russia)

=== Third place match ===
1 December 2018
16:00

New Zealand	2–1	Canada
Wisnewski 1', 13'	Report	Kazandjian 64'

Estadio Charrúa, Montevideo
Attendance: 1,328
Referee: Riem Hussein (Germany)

=== Final ===
1 December 2018
19:00

Spain	2–1	Mexico
Pina 16', 26'	Report	Castro 29'

Estadio Charrúa, Montevideo
Attendance: 5,488
Referee: Marie-Soleil Beaudoin (Canada)

== Winners ==
2018 FIFA U-17 Women's World Cup winners

Spain
1st title

== Goalscorers ==
There were 86 goals scored in 32 matches, for an average of 2.69 goals per match.

7 goals

- (Ghana) Mukarama Abdulai
- (Spain) Clàudia Pina

3 goals

- (Canada) Jordyn Huitema
- (Mexico) Nicole Pérez
- (New Zealand) Grace Wisnewski
- (Spain) Irene López

2 goals

- (Cameroon) Alice Kameni
- (Canada) Lara Kazandjian
- (Colombia) Gisela Robledo
- (Germany) Gia Corley
- (Germany) Shekiera Martinez
- (Ghana) Millot Pokuaa
- (Japan) Sara Ito
- (Japan) Haruka Osawa
- (New Zealand) Kelli Brown
- (North Korea) Kim Kyong-yong
- (Spain) Eva Navarro
- (United States) Sunshine Fontes

1 goal

- (Brazil) Amanda
- (Brazil) Maria Eduarda
- (Brazil) Jheniffer
- (Brazil) Júlia
- (Canada) Jessica De Filippo
- (Canada) Andersen Williams
- (Finland) Jenni Kantanen
- (Finland) Aino Vuorinen
- (Germany) Charlotte Blümel
- (Germany) Laura Donhauser
- (Germany) Vanessa Fudalla
- (Germany) Sophie Weidauer
- (Ghana) Grace Animah
- (Ghana) Fuseina Mumuni
- (Ghana) Suzzy Teye
- (Japan) Momoka Kinoshita
- (Japan) Tomoko Tanaka
- (Japan) Yuzuki Yamamoto
- (Mexico) Vanessa Buso
- (Mexico) Denise Castro
- (Mexico) Alison González
- (New Zealand) Amelia Abbott
- (North Korea) Yun Ji-hwa
- (North Korea) Ri Kum-hyang
- (North Korea) Ko Kyong-hui
- (North Korea) Ri Su-jong
- (North Korea) Kim Yun-ok
- (South Africa) Zethembiso Vilakazi
- (South Korea) Cho Mi-jin
- (Spain) Paola Hernández
- (Spain) Mabel Okoye
- (Spain) Salma Paralluelo
- (United States) Mia Fishel
- (Uruguay) Belén Aquino
- (Uruguay) Esperanza Pizarro

1 own goal

- (New Zealand) Hannah Mackay-Wright (against Japan)

== Awards ==
The following awards were given for the tournament:

Golden Ball	Silver Ball	Bronze Ball
(Spain) Clàudia Pina	(Mexico) Nicole Pérez	(Ghana) Mukarama Abdulai

Golden Boot	Silver Boot	Bronze Boot
(Ghana) Mukarama Abdulai (7 goals, 2 assists)	(Spain) Clàudia Pina	(Spain) Irene López

FIFA Fair Play Trophy	Golden Glove
Japan	(Spain) Catalina Coll
