= Spain women's national under-17 football team =

Spain Women's U-17
- Association: Royal Spanish Football Federation
- Confederation: UEFA (Europe)
- Head coach: Milagros Martínez
- Most caps: Eva Navarro (38)
- Top scorer: Clàudia Pina (35)
- FIFA code: ESP
First colours	Second colours

First international
- Spain 1–1 Czech Republic (Madrid, Spain; 5 November 2007)

Biggest win
- Spain 22–0 Montenegro (Baku, Azerbaijan; 2 October 2017)

Biggest defeat
- Germany 7–0 Spain (Nyon, Switzerland; 26 June 2009)

UEFA Women's Under-17 Championship
- Appearances: 15 (first in 2009)
- Best result: Winners (2010, 2011, 2015, 2018, 2024)

FIFA U-17 Women's World Cup
- Appearances: 8 (first in 2010)
- Best result: Winners (2018, 2022)

The Spain women's national under-17 football team represents Spain in international football in under-17 categories and is controlled by the Royal Spanish Football Federation. The youth team has reached the World Cup Finals on four occasions (2014, 2018, 2022 and 2024), winning back to back in the last two. It has also won bronze medals on the 2010 and 2016 editions. All these achievements have made Spain the most successful team in World Cup under their category in terms of medals won.

On European Cup the team has reached a total of 9 finals. Becoming champions on 5 occasions and becoming runners-up on 4. Thus making them one of the most successful teams in the under-17 category.

== Honours ==
- FIFA U-17 Women's World Cup
  - (gold) Champions (2): 2018, 2022
  - (silver) Runners-up (2) : 2014, 2024
  - (bronze) Third place (2) : 2010, 2016
- UEFA Women's Under-17 Championship
  - (gold) Champions (5): 2010, 2011, 2015, 2018, 2024
  - (silver) Runners-up (6) : 2009, 2014, 2016, 2017, 2022, 2023
  - (bronze) Third place (2) : 2013, 2019

== Competitive record ==
=== FIFA U-17 Women's World Cup ===
Year	Round	Pld	W	D*	L	GF	GA
(New Zealand) 2008	Did not qualify						
(Trinidad and Tobago) 2010	Third place	6	5	0	1	13	6
(Azerbaijan) 2012	Did not qualify						
(Costa Rica) 2014	Runners-up	6	4	0	2	15	5
(Jordan) 2016	Third place	6	4	1	1	15	5
(Uruguay) 2018	Champions	6	4	2	0	15	3
(India) 2022	Champions	6	5	0	1	7	3
(Dominican Republic) 2024	Runners-up	6	5	1	0	19	3
(Morocco) 2025	Round of 16	4	3	1	0	12	0
(Morocco) 2026	Round of 16	4	3	0	1	9	4
(Morocco) 2027	To be determined						
(Morocco) 2028	To be determined						
(Morocco) 2029	To be determined						
Total:8/13	2 titles	44	33	5	6	105	29

* Draws include knockout matches decided by penalty shoot-out.

=== UEFA Women's Under-17 Championship ===
Year	Round	Position	MP	W	D	L	GF	GA
(Switzerland) 2008	did not qualify
(Switzerland) 2009	Runners-up	2nd	2	1	0	1	2	7
(Switzerland) 2010	Champions	1st	2	1	1	0	3	0
(Switzerland) 2011	Champions	1st	2	2	0	0	5	0
(Switzerland) 2012	did not qualify
(Switzerland) 2013	Semi-finals	3rd	2	1	1	0	6	2
(England) 2014	Runners-up	2nd	5	3	2	0	10	1
(Iceland) 2015	Champions	1st	5	3	2	0	13	4
(Belarus) 2016	Runners-up	2nd	5	3	2	0	10	3
(Czech Republic) 2017	Runners-up	2nd	5	2	2	1	9	6
(Lithuania) 2018	Champions	1st	5	4	1	0	10	1
(Bulgaria) 2019	Semi-finals	3rd	4	2	1	1	10	3
(Sweden) ~~2020~~	Cancelled
(Faroe Islands) ~~2021~~	Cancelled
(Bosnia and Herzegovina) 2022	Runners-up	2nd	5	4	1	0	16	2
(Estonia) 2023	Runners-up	2nd	5	4	0	1	16	4
(Sweden) 2024	Champions	1st	5	5	0	0	19	1
(Faroe Islands) 2025	Group stage	5th	4	2	1	1	11	5
(Northern Ireland) 2026	Semi-finals	3rd	4	2	2	0	8	2
(Finland) 2027	to be determined
(Belgium) 2028	to be determined
(Turkey) 2029	to be determined
Total:13/15	5 titles		55	36	16	5	148	40

== Recent schedule and results ==
This list includes match results from the past 12 months, as well as any future matches that have been scheduled.

Legend

Win Draw Loss Fixture

== Players ==
=== Current squad ===
The following players have been called up for 2025 UEFA Women's Under-17 Championship qualification

Caps and goals as of 20 November 2024.

No.	Pos.	Player	Date of birth (age)	Caps	Goals	Club
1	GK	Anna Álvarez	11 November 2008 (age 17)	3	0	(Royal Spanish Football Federation) Levante
13	GK	Ariadna Ayats	1 January 2008 (age 18)	3	0	(Royal Spanish Football Federation) Barcelona
	GK	Manuela Fernández	4 February 2008 (age 18)	1	0	(Royal Spanish Football Federation) Real Madrid
4	DF	Silvia Cristóbal	1 May 2008 (age 18)	11	1	(Royal Spanish Football Federation) Real Madrid
5	DF	Julia Torres	1 January 2009 (age 17)	7	0	(Royal Spanish Football Federation) Sevilla
18	DF	Xenia Barrios	1 January 2008 (age 18)	4	0	(Royal Spanish Football Federation) Sevilla
2	DF	Raquel Zuazo	4 February 2008 (age 18)	3	1	(Royal Spanish Football Federation) Real Madrid
15	DF	Andrea Gálvez	2 September 2008 (age 18)	3	0	(Royal Spanish Football Federation) Sevilla
12	DF	Aliza Fernández	29 October 2009 (age 17)	2	0	(Royal Spanish Football Federation) Athletic Club
8	MF	Celia Gómez	29 September 2008 (age 18)	12	1	(Royal Spanish Football Federation) Atlético Madrid
10	MF	Rosalía Domínguez	11 November 2008 (age 17)	6	5	(Royal Spanish Football Federation) Barcelona
16	MF	María Carvajal	29 July 2008 (age 18)	3	2	(Royal Spanish Football Federation) Sporting de Huelva
14	MF	Avril Serrano	1 January 2009 (age 17)	3	0	(Royal Spanish Football Federation) Barcelona
6	MF	Daniela Sáenz	1 January 2008 (age 18)	3	0	(Royal Spanish Football Federation) Málaga
19	MF	Claudia Barrios	3 December 2008 (age 17)	3	0	(Royal Spanish Football Federation) Burgos
7	MF	Noa Jiménez	1 January 2008 (age 18)	2	0	(Royal Spanish Football Federation) Barcelona
11	FW	Anna Quer	30 May 2008 (age 18)	9	1	(Royal Spanish Football Federation) Barcelona
9	FW	Claudia Indias	27 March 2008 (age 18)	6	1	(Royal Spanish Football Federation) Madrid CFF
20	FW	Carlota Chacón	4 April 2009 (age 17)	4	2	(Royal Spanish Football Federation) Real Sociedad
3	FW	Iraia Fernández	26 July 2009 (age 17)	4	0	(Royal Spanish Football Federation) Athletic Club
17	FW	Candela Rodríguez	19 April 2009 (age 17)	4	0	(Royal Spanish Football Federation) Real Madrid

=== Recent call-ups ===
Pos.	Player	Date of birth (age)	Caps	Goals	Club	Latest call-up

=== Previous rosters ===
- 2010 FIFA U-17 Women's World Cup squad
- 2014 FIFA U-17 Women's World Cup squad
- 2016 FIFA U-17 Women's World Cup squad
- 2018 FIFA U-17 Women's World Cup squad
- 2022 FIFA U-17 Women's World Cup squad
- 2024 FIFA U-17 Women's World Cup squad
- 2018 UEFA Women's Under-17 Championship
- 2022 UEFA Women's Under-17 Championship
- 2023 UEFA Women's Under-17 Championship
- 2024 UEFA Women's Under-17 Championship

== Statistics ==
=== Top Appearances ===
#	Name	Career	Caps	Goals
1	**Eva María Navarro**	2016–2018	38	18
2	**Laia Aleixandri**	2015–2017	34	8
3	Celia Segura	2022–2024	33	16
3	Noa Ortega	2022–2024	33	16
5	**Vicky López**	2021–2023	30	6
5	**Catalina Coll**	2016–2018	30	0
5	Lorena Navarro	2015–2017	30	26
5	**Berta Pujadas**	2015–2017	30	2
9	**Clàudia Pina**	2016–2018	29	35
9	Paula Comendador	2022–2024	29	13

Those marked in **bold** went on to earn full international caps

=== Top Goalscorers ===
#	Player	Career	Goals	Caps
1	**Clàudia Pina**	2016–2018	35	29
2	Lorena Navarro	2015–2017	26	30
2	Alba Cerrato	2022–2024	26	28
4	**Eva María Navarro**	2016–2018	18	38
5	**Vicky López**	2021–2023	17	30
6	**Nahikari García**	2012–2014	16	21
6	Celia Segura	2022–2014	16	33
8	Paula Comendador	2022–2024	13	29
9	Cristina Redondo	2022–2023	11	13
9	Paloma Lázaro	2009–2010	11	10
9	Iraia Pérez de Heredia	2010–2011	11	10
9	Carla Camacho	2021–2022	11	21

Those marked in **bold** went on to earn full international caps

=== Hat-tricks ===
Player	Against	Result	Competition	Date
Rocío Serrano	Belarus	12–0	UEFA Women's u17 Championship qualification	7 November 2007
Paloma Lázaro ^{6}	Armenia	21–0	UEFA Women's u17 Championship qualification	26 October 2009
Laura Ortiz	Armenia	21–0	UEFA Women's u17 Championship qualification	26 October 2009
Iraia Pérez de Heredia ^{6}	Armenia	21–0	UEFA Women's u17 Championship qualification	26 October 2009
Lorena Valderas ^{6}	(Georgia (country)) Georgia	13–0	UEFA Women's u17 Championship qualification	3 October 2010
Laura Ortiz	(Georgia (country)) Georgia	13–0	UEFA Women's u17 Championship qualification	3 October 2010
Iraia Pérez de Heredia	Italy	6–1	UEFA Women's u17 Championship qualification	11 April 2011
Sonia Fraile	Ukraine	7–0	UEFA Women's u17 Championship qualification	5 October 2011
Andrea Estebán	Slovakia	0–4	UEFA Women's u17 Championship qualification	5 September 2012
Nahikari García	Romania	0–8	UEFA Women's u17 Championship qualification	2 October 2013
Lucía García	Germany	0–4	2015 UEFA Women's Under-17 Championship	25 June 2015
Lorena Navarro	Armenia	0–9	UEFA Women's u17 Championship qualification	23 October 2015
Clàudia Pina	Scotland	0–4	Friendly Tournament in Příbram	6 September 2016
Lorena Navarro^{5}	Jordan	0–6	2016 FIFA U-17 Women's World Cup	30 September 2016
Lorena Navarro	Venezuela	0–4	2016 FIFA U-17 Women's World Cup	21 October 2016
Clàudia Pina	Portugal	6–1	UEFA Women's u17 Championship qualification	28 March 2017
Eva María Navarro ^{4}	Montenegro	22–0	UEFA Women's u17 Championship qualification	2 October 2017
Clàudia Pina^{7}	Montenegro	22–0	UEFA Women's u17 Championship qualification	2 October 2017
Bruna Vilamala	Montenegro	22–0	UEFA Women's u17 Championship qualification	2 October 2017
Sara Carrillo	Slovakia	5–0	UEFA Women's u17 Championship qualification	23 March 2019
Salma Paralluelo	Portugal	6–0	2019 UEFA Women's u17 Championship	11 May 2019
Magalí Capdevila	Hungary	6–0	UEFA Women's u17 Championship qualification	10 April 2022
Ainhoa Alguacil	Denmark	3–1	UEFA Women's u17 Championship qualification	18 March 2023
Cristina Redondo	Switzerland	3–0	2023 UEFA Women's Under-17 Championship	17 May 2023
Maria Antolin	Estonia	6–0	2023 UEFA Women's Under-17 Championship	20 May 2023

^{4} Player scored 4 goals
^{5} Player scored 5 goals
^{6} Player scored 6 goals
^{7} Player scored 7 goals

== Head-to-head record ==
The following table shows Spain's head-to-head record in the FIFA U-17 Women's World Cup.

Opponent	Pld	W	D	L	GF	GA	GD	Win %
Australia	1	1	0	0	3	1	+2	100.00
Brazil	1	1	0	0	2	1	+1	100.00
Canada	1	1	0	0	5	0	+5	100.00
Chile	1	1	0	0	3	1	+2	100.00
China	1	1	0	0	1	0	+1	100.00
Colombia	5	4	1	0	9	2	+7	80.00
Ecuador	1	1	0	0	5	0	+5	100.00
England	1	1	0	0	3	0	+3	100.00
France	1	0	1	0	0	0	+0	0.00
Germany	2	2	0	0	3	1	+2	100.00
Italy	1	1	0	0	2	0	+2	100.00
Ivory Coast	1	1	0	0	3	0	+3	100.00
Japan	5	2	0	3	6	9	−3	40.00
Jordan	1	1	0	0	6	0	+6	100.00
Mexico	4	2	1	1	6	4	+2	50.00
New Zealand	4	4	0	0	10	1	+9	100.00
Nigeria	1	1	0	0	3	0	+3	100.00
North Korea	3	1	2	0	3	2	+1	33.33
Paraguay	1	1	0	0	7	1	+6	100.00
South Korea	4	3	0	1	15	2	+13	75.00
United States	2	1	0	1	4	3	+1	50.00
Venezuela	2	2	0	0	6	1	+5	100.00
Total	44	33	5	6	105	29	+76	75.00

== See also ==
- Spain women's national football team
- Spain women's national under-19 football team
- Spain women's national under-20 football team
- Spain women's national under-23 football team
