= Paola Hernández =

Spanish footballer (born 2002)

Personal information
- Full name: Paola Hernández Díaz
- Date of birth: 25 July 2002 (age 24)
- Place of birth: Santa Cruz de Tenerife, Spain
- Height: 1.63 m (5 ft 4 in)
- Position: Midfielder

Team information
- Current team: Servette
- Number: 6

Senior career*
Years	Team	Apps	(Gls)
2016–2020	Granadilla B	4+	(1+)
2017–2026	Granadilla	59	(3)
2026–	Servette		
- * Club domestic league appearances and goals as of 00:01, 13 December 2021 (UTC)

Paola Hernández Díaz (born 25 July 2002) is a Spanish footballer who plays as a midfielder for Swiss Women's Super League club Servette.

== Club career ==
Hernández started her career at Granadilla B.

On 23 July 2026, Hernández signed a contract with Swiss Women's Super League club Servette.
