= Eredivisie Awards =

Dutch professional football league awards

The Eredivisie Awards are awarded by the Eredivisie CV, the Vrouwen Eredivisie, and ESPN to the best footballers of each Eredivisie season since 2018. Women footballers first received awards beginning in 2022.

The VriendenLoterij, KPN, and the Johan Cruyff Foundation are partners of the Eredivisie Awards. Unibet has previously been a partner of the awards.

== Ceremony ==
Since 2021, the awards have been awarded during a ceremony broadcast by ESPN. The ceremony in 2021 was held at the Lido Club in Amsterdam. Since, the ceremony has been held at DeFabrique in Utrecht. The ceremony has been presented by Jan Joost van Gangelen (2021–2024), Fresia Cousiño Arias (2022–2026), and Milan van Dongen (2025–2026).

== Men's awards ==
=== Player of the Year ===
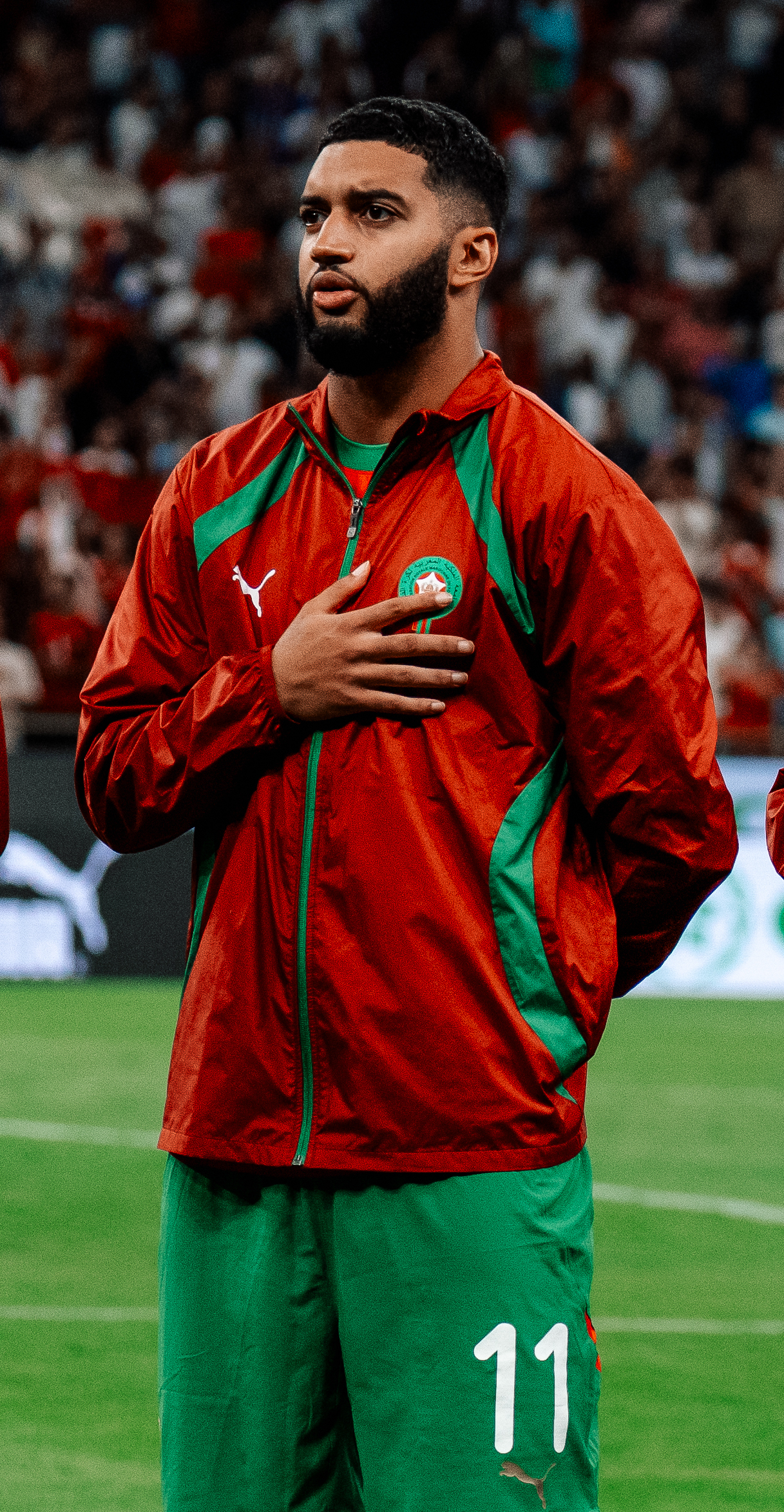
Ismael Saibari was named Eredivisie Player of the Year for the 2025–26 season

The Player of the Year award is awarded to the best player of the Eredivisie season since 2018. The nominees are chosen based on statistical reporting by Opta Sports and votes for the Man of the Match awards during the season. The winner is eventually picked by the captain of each Eredivisie club, with support from the VVCS.

Season	Winner	Club	Ref.
2017–18	(Colombia) Santiago Arias	PSV	
2018–19	(Netherlands) Frenkie de Jong	Ajax	
2019–20	Not awarded		
2020–21	(Serbia) Dušan Tadić	Ajax	
2021–22	(Netherlands) Jurriën Timber	Ajax	
2022–23	(Turkey) Orkun Kökçü	Feyenoord	
2023–24	(Netherlands) Luuk de Jong	PSV	
2024–25	(Netherlands) Sem Steijn	Twente	
2025–26	(Morocco) Ismael Saibari	PSV	

=== Johan Cruyff Talent of the Year ===
The Johan Cruyff Talent of the Year award, named the U21 Player of the Year until 2021, is awarded to the best young player of the Eredivisie season. The nominees are chosen based on statistical reporting by Opta Sports and votes for the Man of the Match awards during the season. The winner is eventually picked by the head coach of each Eredivisie club and the Netherlands national team. The winner gets the opportunity to build a Cruyff Court at a location of their choice.

Season	Winner	Club	Ref.
2017–18	(Brazil) David Neres	Ajax	
2018–19	(Spain) Angeliño	PSV	
2019–20	Not awarded		
2020–21	(Netherlands) Ryan Gravenberch	Ajax	
2021–22	(Netherlands) Jurriën Timber	Ajax	
2022–23	(Netherlands) Xavi Simons	PSV	
2023–24	(Belgium) Johan Bakayoko	PSV	
2024–25	(Netherlands) Jorrel Hato	Ajax	
2025–26	(Belgium) Mika Godts	Ajax	

=== Willy van der Kuijlen Trophy ===
The top goalscorer of the Eredivisie season is awarded with the Willy van der Kuijlen Trophy since 2021.

Season	Winner	Club	Goals	Ref.
2020–21	(Greece) Giorgos Giakoumakis	VVV-Venlo	26	
2021–22	(Ivory Coast) Sébastien Haller	Ajax	21	
2022–23	(Greece) Tasos Douvikas	FC Utrecht	19	
2022–23	(Netherlands) Xavi Simons	PSV	19	
2023–24	(Netherlands) Luuk de Jong	PSV	29	
2023–24	(Greece) Vangelis Pavlidis	AZ	29	
2024–25	(Netherlands) Sem Steijn	FC Twente	24	
2025–26	(Japan) Ayase Ueda	Feyenoord	25	

=== Goal of the Year ===
The Goal of the Year award is awarded to the player who scored the most beautiful goal of the season, based on votes by fans, since 2021.

Season	Winner	Club	Opponent	Ref.
2020–21	(Argentina) Marcos Senesi	Feyenoord	ADO Den Haag	
2021–22	(Belgium) Cyril Ngonge	Groningen	AZ	
2022–23	(Netherlands) Michiel Kramer	RKC Waalwijk	Go Ahead Eagles	
2023–24	(Brazil) Igor Paixão	Feyenoord	FC Utrecht	
2024–25	(Netherlands) Bryan Linssen	NEC	NAC Breda	
2025–26	(Netherlands) Gyan de Regt	Excelsior	Fortuna Sittard	

=== Referee of the Year ===
The Referee of the Year award was awarded to the best referee of the Eredivisie season in 2021.

Season	Winner	Ref.
2020–21	Björn Kuipers	

=== Holland Casino Fair Play Award ===
The Holland Casino Fair Play Award was awarded to the team with the least amount of fouls committed per defensive action in 2022.

Season	Winner	Ref.
2021–22	PSV	

== Women's awards ==
=== Player of the Year ===
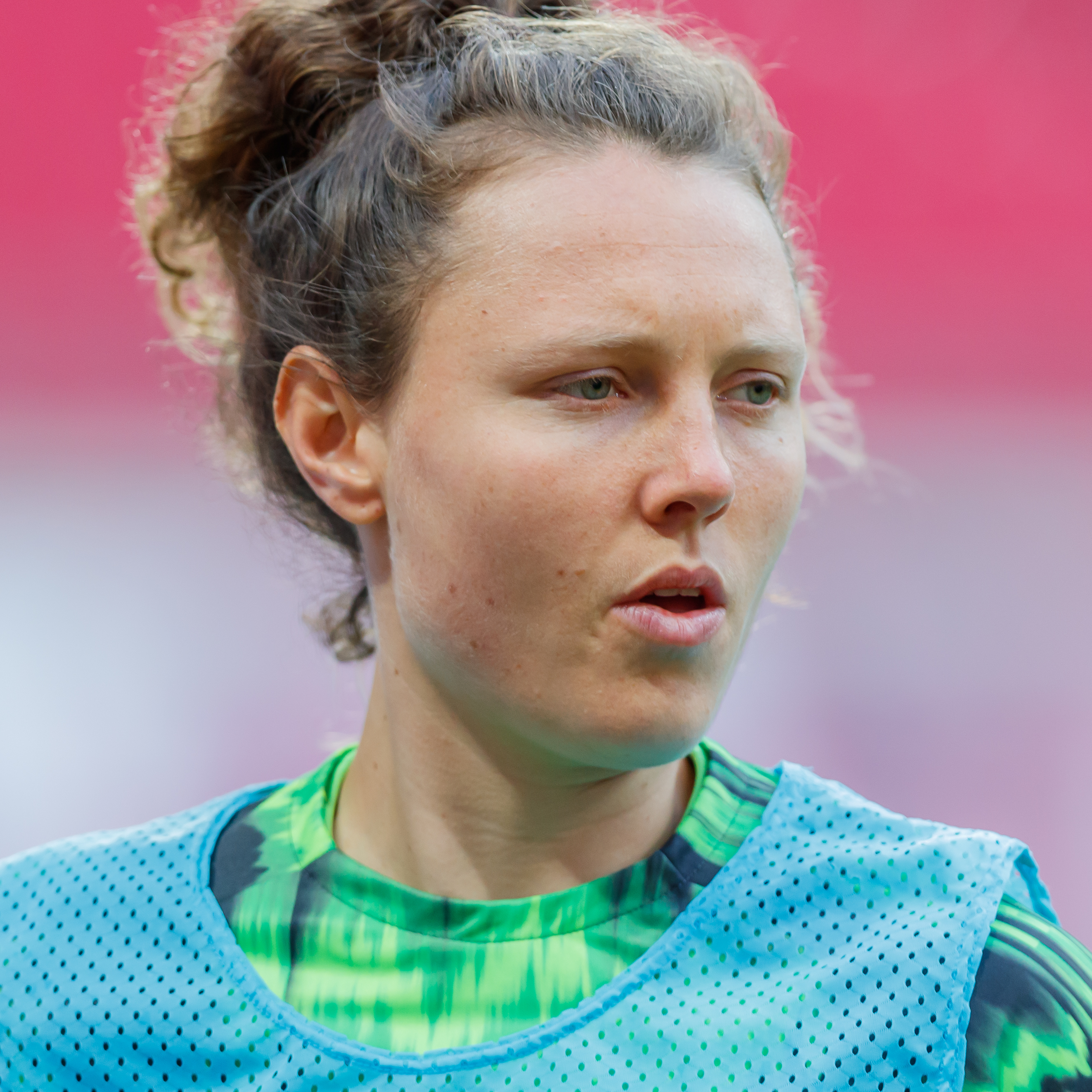
Fenna Kalma was named Eredivisie Player of the Year for consecutive seasons

The Player of the Year award is awarded to the best player of the Eredivisie season since 2022. The nominees are chosen based on statistical reporting by Opta Sports. The winner is eventually picked by the captain of each Eredivisie club, with support from the VVCS.

Season	Winner	Club	Ref.
2021–22	(Netherlands) Fenna Kalma	FC Twente	
2022–23	(Netherlands) Fenna Kalma	FC Twente	
2023–24	(Belgium) Tessa Wullaert	Fortuna Sittard	
2024–25	(Netherlands) Renate Jansen	PSV	
2025–26	(Japan) Mao Itamura	Feyenoord	

=== Johan Cruyff Talent of the Year ===
The Johan Cruyff Talent of the Year is awarded to the best young player of the Eredivisie season since 2022. The winner is eventually picked by the head coach of each Eredivisie club and the Netherlands national team. The winner gets the opportunity to build a Cruyff Court at a location of their choice.

Season	Winner	Club	Ref.
2021–22	(Netherlands) Wieke Kaptein	FC Twente	
2022–23	(Netherlands) Esmee Brugts	PSV	
2023–24	(United States) Lily Yohannes	Ajax	
2024–25	(Netherlands) Veerle Buurman	PSV	
2025–26	(Netherlands) Renee van Asten	Ajax	

=== Top goalscorer ===
The top goalscorer of the Eredivisie season is awarded with a trophy since 2022.

Season	Winner	Club	Goals	Ref.
2021–22	(Netherlands) Fenna Kalma	FC Twente	33	
2022–23	(Netherlands) Fenna Kalma	FC Twente	30	
2023–24	(Belgium) Tessa Wullaert	Fortuna Sittard	26	
2024–25	(Netherlands) Jaimy Ravensbergen	FC Twente	23	
2025–26	(Netherlands) Desiree van Lunteren	AZ	16	
2025–26	(Netherlands) Jaimy Ravensbergen	FC Twente	16	

=== Goal of the Year ===
The Goal of the Year award is awarded to the player who scored the most beautiful goal of the season, based on votes by fans. Women have their own category since 2026.

Season	Winner	Club	Opponent	Ref.
2025–26	(Netherlands) Sam de Jong	FC Utrecht	NAC Breda	

== Mixed awards ==
=== Voetbal Geeft Prijs ===
Voetbal Geeft Prijs is an initiative by the VriendenLoterij, the Eredivisie CV, and ESPN to recognise impactful community projects since 2023.

Season	Winner	Initiative	Ref.
2022–23	Emmen		
2023–24	Excelsior	Voetbal Extra	
2024–25	Heracles Almelo	Kleedkamersessies	

=== Oeuvre Award ===
The Oeuvre Award is a tribute to individuals who have made significant contributions to Dutch football since 2021.

Year	Winner	Ref.
2021	(Netherlands) Arjen Robben	
2022	(Netherlands) Wim Jansen	
2023	(Netherlands) Louis van Gaal	
2024	(Netherlands) Edwin van der Sar	
2025	(Netherlands) Ronald Koeman	
2026	(Netherlands) Sarina Wiegman	

== See also ==
- Dutch Footballer of the Year
- Eredivisie Player of the Month
