= Daniëlle de Jong =

Dutch footballer (born 2002)

Personal information
- Date of birth: 11 October 2002 (age 24)
- Place of birth: Geldermalsen, Netherlands
- Position: Goalkeeper

Team information
- Current team: Juventus
- Number: 1

Youth career
- VV Tricht
- CTO Eindhoven
- PSV

Senior career*
Years	Team	Apps	(Gls)
2020–2023	PSV	4	(0)
2023–2025	Twente	33	(0)
2025–	Juventus	16	(0)

International career^{‡}
2020	Netherlands U19	1	(0)
2022–2024	Netherlands U23	12	(0)
2024–	Netherlands	1	(0)
- * Club domestic league appearances and goals as of 26 September 2026 ‡ National team caps and goals as of 28 November 2024

Daniëlle de Jong (born 11 October 2002) is a Dutch professional footballer who plays as a goalkeeper for Serie A Women club Juventus and the Netherlands national team.

== Club career ==
De Jong is a former youth academy player of VV Tricht, CTO Eindhoven and PSV. She made her senior team debut for PSV on 1 November 2020 in a 6–0 league win against Excelsior. In February 2021, she signed her first professional contract with the club.

On 15 February 2023, Twente announced the signing of De Jong on a two-year contract until June 2025. On 1 July 2025, she joined Italian club Juventus on a three-year contract.

== International career ==
De Jong has represented the Netherlands at under-19, under-23 and senior levels. She made her debut for the Netherlands under-23 team on 14 November 2022 in a 6–0 win against Belgium.

In September 2023, De Jong was called up to the Netherlands senior team for the first time. She made her debut on 31 May 2024 in a 1–0 win against Finland. In June 2025, she was called up for the UEFA Women's Euro 2025.

== Personal life ==
She is in a relationship with her compatriot Esmee Brugts.

== Career statistics ==
=== Club ===
As of match played 7 February 2026

Appearances and goals by club, season and competition
Club	Season	League			Cups		Continental		Total	
Club	Season	Division	Apps	Goals	Apps	Goals	Apps	Goals	Apps	Goals
PSV	2020–21	Vrouwen Eredivisie	1	0	0	0	0	0	1	0
PSV	2021–22	Vrouwen Eredivisie	0	0	0	0	0	0	0	0
PSV	2022–23	Vrouwen Eredivisie	3	0	4	0	0	0	7	0
PSV	Total		4	0	4	0	0	0	8	0
FC Twente	2023–24	Vrouwen Eredivisie	19	0	3	0	4	0	26	0
FC Twente	2024–25	Vrouwen Eredivisie	15	0	0	0	1	0	16	0
FC Twente	Total		34	0	3	0	5	0	42	0
Juventus	2025–26	Serie A	12	0	4	0	0	0	16	0
Juventus	Total		12	0	4	0	0	0	16	0
Career total			50	0	11	0	5	0	66	0

=== International ===
As of match played 31 May 2024

Appearances and goals by national team and year
National team	Year	Apps	Goals
Netherlands	2024	1	0
Netherlands	2025	0	0
Netherlands	2026	0	0
Total		1	0

== Honours ==
PSV

- KNVB Women's Cup: 2020–21

Twente

- Vrouwen Eredivisie: 2023–24, 2024–25
- KNVB Women's Cup: 2024–25
- Eredivisie Cup: 2023–24
- Dutch Women's Super Cup: 2023, 2024

Juventus

- Serie A Women's Cup: 2025, 2026
- Supercoppa Italiana: 2025
