= Alieke Tuin =

Dutch footballer (born 2001)

Personal information
- Date of birth: 24 January 2001 (age 25)
- Place of birth: Winsum, Netherlands
- Height: 1.76 m (5 ft 9 in)
- Positions: Left winger; left-back

Team information
- Current team: RB Leipzig
- Number: 22

Youth career
- VV Hunsingo
- VV Winsum
- 2017–2020: SC Heerenveen

Senior career*
Years	Team	Apps	(Gls)
2020–2021	SC Heerenveen	19	(0)
2021–2022	VV Alkmaar	23	(3)
2022–2024	Fortuna Sittard	42	(4)
2024–2026	Twente	44	(6)
2026–	RB Leipzig	6	(2)

International career
2023–2024	Netherlands U23	10	(0)
- * Club domestic league appearances and goals as of 21:47, 7 October 2026 (UTC)

Alieke Tuin (born 24 January 2001) is a Dutch professional footballer who plays as a left-back for Bundesliga club RB Leipzig. She has represented the Netherlands at youth international level and played in the Eredivisie from 2020 to 2026.

== Club career ==
Tuin started her professional career at SC Heerenveen, signing in May 2020. She had played for the club's youth program for several years after playing for youth clubs with Hunsingo and VV Winsum. She debuted in the first match of the 2020–21 Eredivisie season, playing the final five minutes of a 2–0 victory at Excelsior on 6 September. She played in 19 match, starting once, topping out at 61 minutes in that start against VV Alkmaar.

For the 2021–22 season, she transferred to VV Alkmaar. She scored her first Eredivisie goal in her second match with Alkmaar, the lone goal in a 1–0 win over ADO Den Haag on 3 September. Tuin started all but one of Alkmaar's matches in her one season with the club, scoring three goals.

Tuin joined Fortuna Sittard for the 2022–23 season. She scored four goals in two seasons in Sittard, starting all 44 of her club's Eredivisie matches. She began playing more left back in October 2022 because she believed she had a clearer path to make the Dutch national team at that position.

In March 2024, Tuin announced her move to FC Twente for the 2024–25 season on a two-year contract. Her first goal for the Tukkers came on 18 September 2024 in a Champions League qualifying round match against ŽNK Osijek in Croatia. She scored another goal one week later when Osijek visited Enschede. She scored her first Eredivise goal for Twente against her former club, Fortuna Sittard, on 18 January 2025.

In April 2026, Tuin signed with RB Leipzig, agreeing to play for the Frauen-Bundesliga club through 2029.

== International career ==
On 6 April 2023, Tuin made her first appearance for the Netherlands U23 team, where she started in a 2–0 win over Italy. She contributed to the opposition's goal in a win over Scotland on a failed back pass to the goalkeeper.

As of October 2026, Tuin has not played for the Dutch national team. She was named to the provisional 2023 World Cup tournament squad and called up for friendly matches in 2022, but she was not chosen for the final World Cup squad.

== Honours ==
Twente

- Vrouwen Eredivisie: 2024–25
- KNVB Women's Cup: 2024–25
- Dutch Women's Super Cup: 2024, 2025
