= Liz Rijsbergen =

Dutch footballer (born 2002)

Personal information
- Full name: Liz Rijsbergen
- Date of birth: 14 February 2002 (age 24)
- Place of birth: Leiderdorp, Netherlands
- Height: 1.74 m (5 ft 9 in)
- Position: Forward

Team information
- Current team: PSV
- Number: 18

Youth career
- Voorschoten '97
- ADO Den Haag

Senior career*
Years	Team	Apps	(Gls)
2020–2023	ADO Den Haag	63	(23)
2023–2025	Twente	23	(12)
2025–	PSV	31	(15)

International career^{‡}
2022	Netherlands U20	10	(2)
2021–2026	Netherlands U23	20	(6)
2026–	Netherlands	2	(1)
- * Club domestic league appearances and goals as of 22 November 2026 ‡ National team caps and goals as of 9 June 2026

Liz Rijsbergen (born 14 February 2002) is a Dutch professional footballer who plays as a forward for Vrouwen Eredivisie club PSV Eindhoven and the Netherlands national team.

== Club career ==
=== ADO Den Haag ===
Rijsbergen made her Eredivisie debut against PEC Zwolle on 6 September 2020. On 26 November 2020, she signed a three-year contract extension. Rijsbergen scored her first league goal against Excelsior Rotterdam on 11 December 2020, scoring in the 54th minute. During her first season at ADO Den Haag, Rijsbergen played as both a right- and left-winger and had 5 goals and 6 assists.

Her final season in Den Haag, 2022–23, was her most productive, as she led the team with 11 goals, which was fifth-most in the league. Rijsbergen was one of the nominees for Player of the Year award, losing out to Fenna Kalma.

=== Twente ===
On 17 May 2023, Rijsbergen joined Twente on a two-year deal lasting until June 2025. on 2 September 2023, Rijsbergen scored on her Twente debut in the Supercup against Ajax after just 39 seconds in a 5–2 win to claim the trophy. She scored twice on her league debut against Telstar on 16 September 2023, getting on the scoresheet in the 13th and 32nd minute. She led the team in scoring with 10 goals in Eredivisie games, which tied for sixth-most in the league. However, she suffered a serious knee injury during an April 2024 match against FC Utrecht, which kept her off the pitch for the remainder of the season and the beginning of the 2024–25 season. After missing almost a year of football, Rijsbergen made her comeback in April 2025, playing the second half of a 5–1 KNVB Women's Cup win against Saestum.

=== PSV ===
In May 2025, Rijsbergen joined PSV.

== International career ==
Rijsbergen has represented the Netherlands at the U20 and U23 international levels. She scored two goals against Ghana at the 2022 FIFA U-20 Women's World Cup, helping Netherlands finish fourth in the tournament.

In April 2026, Rijsbergen received her first call-up to the Netherlands national team. She made her debut on 5 June 2026 in a 3–2 loss to the Republic of Ireland. Four days later, on 9 June, she scored her first goal in a 3–1 win over Poland.

== Career statistics ==
=== International ===
As of match played 9 June 2026

Appearances and goals by national team and year
National team	Year	Apps	Goals
Netherlands	2026	2	1
Total		2	1

Scores and results list Netherlands' goal tally first, score column indicates score after each Rijsbergen goal.

List of international goals scored by Liz Rijsbergen
No.	Date	Venue	Opponent	Score	Result	Competition
1	9 June 2026	Asito Stadion, Almelo, Netherlands	Poland	3–0	3–1	2027 FIFA Women's World Cup qualification

== Honours ==
Twente

- Vrouwen Eredivisie: 2023–24, 2024–25
- KNVB Women's Cup: 2024–25
- Eredivisie Cup: 2023–24
- Dutch Women's Super Cup: 2023

PSV

- Vrouwen Eredivisie: 2025–26
- Eredivisie Cup: 2025–26
- Dutch Women's Super Cup: 2026

Individual

- KNVB Women's Cup top goalscorer: 2022–23
