= Amber Verspaget =

Dutch footballer

Personal information
- Date of birth: 26 January 1998 (age 28)
- Place of birth: Eindhoven, Netherlands
- Position: Defender

Team information
- Current team: Feyenoord
- Number: 4

Senior career*
Years	Team	Apps	(Gls)
2016–2018	Achilles '29	40	(1)
2018–2022	ADO Den Haag	56	(2)
2022–	Feyenoord	41	(1)

International career
2013	Netherlands U15	2	(1)
2014	Netherlands U16	2	(0)
- * Club domestic league appearances and goals as of 12:30, 1 July 2024 (UTC)

Amber Verspaget (born 26 January 1998) is a Dutch footballer who plays as defender for Feyenoord in the Eredivisie.

== Career ==
=== Achilles '29 ===
Verspaget made her league debut against ADO Den Haag on 28 October 2016. She scored her first league goal against VV Alkmaar on 24 April 2018, scoring in the 34th minute.

=== ADO Den Haag ===
Verspaget made her league debut against Excelsior Rotterdam on 7 September 2018. On 20 June 2019, she extended her contract by another year. Verspaget extended her contract for two years on 13 May 2021. She scored her first league goal against PSV on 1 October 2021, scoring in the 22nd minute. Verspaget was named second captain during her time at ADO Den Haag.

=== Feyenoord ===
On 3 May 2022, Verspaget was announced at Feyenoord. She made her league debut against Excelsior Rotterdam on 16 September 2022. She scored her first league goal against Telstar on 12 March 2023, scoring in the 32nd minute. Verspaget signed a two-year deal on 23 April 2024.
