= Mao Itamura =

Japanese footballer (born 2006)

Personal information
- Date of birth: 5 August 2006 (age 20)
- Place of birth: Hiroshima, Japan
- Height: 1.60 m (5 ft 3 in)
- Position: Forward

Team information
- Current team: Liverpool
- Number: 26

Youth career
- 2019–2024: JFA Academy Fukushima

Senior career*
Years	Team	Apps	(Gls)
2022–2024	JFA Academy Fukushima	52	(48)
2025–2026	Feyenoord	30	(10)
2026–	Liverpool	0	(0)

International career^{‡}
2022	Japan U17	2	(1)
2024–	Japan U20	12	(10)
Medal record
Women's football
Representing Japan
AFC U-20 Women's Asian Cup
Winner	2026 Thailand
- * Club domestic league appearances and goals as of 14:10, 27 May 2026 (UTC) ‡ National team caps and goals as of 14:10, 27 May 2026 (UTC)

Mao Itamura (Japanese: 板村 真央; born 8 August 2006) is a Japanese professional footballer who plays as a forward or midfielder for Women's Super League club Liverpool.

== Early life ==
Itamura was born on 8 August 2006. Growing up, she attended a football boarding school in Japan.

== Club career ==
=== Early career & Feyenoord ===
Itamura started her career with Japanese side JFA Academy Fukushima. Following her stint there, she signed for Dutch side Feyenoord in 2025. After the 2025–26 Eredivisie season, in which she helped Feyenoord qualify for international football for the first time in their club history, Itamura was named Player of the Year in the Eredivisie with eight goals and six assists.

=== Liverpool ===
On 20 July 2026, Itamura signed with Women's Super League side Liverpool.

== International career ==
Itamura is a Japan youth international. During the spring of 2026, she played for the Japan national under-20 team at the 2026 AFC U-20 Women's Asian Cup.

== Style of play ==
Itamura plays as a forward. Right-footed, she is known for her dribbling ability and shooting ability.

== Career statistics ==
=== Club ===
As of match played 25 May 2026

Appearances and goals by club, season and competition
Club	Season	League			National cup (Note: Includes Empress's Cup, KNVB Women's Cup, Women's FA Cup)		League cup (Note: Includes Eredivisie Cup, Women's League Cup)		Total	
Club	Season	Division	Apps	Goals	Apps	Goals	Apps	Goals	Apps	Goals
JFA Academy Fukushima	2022	Nadeshiko League 2	14	13	1	0	0	0	15	13
JFA Academy Fukushima	2023	Nadeshiko League 2	18	17	1	0	0	0	19	17
JFA Academy Fukushima	2024	Nadeshiko League 2	20	18	2	4	0	0	22	22
JFA Academy Fukushima	Total		52	48	4	4	0	0	56	52
Feyenoord	2024–25	Vrouwen Eredivisie	10	2	3	2	0	0	13	4
Feyenoord	2025–26	Vrouwen Eredivisie	20	8	0	0	1	0	21	8
Feyenoord	Total		30	10	3	2	1	0	34	12
Liverpool	2026–27	Women's Super League	0	0	0	0	0	0	0	0
Career total			82	58	7	6	1	0	90	64

== Honours ==
Japan U20

- AFC U-20 Women's Asian Cup: 2026

Individual

- Eredivisie Player of the Year: 2025–26
