= Hera United =

Women's football club in Amsterdam (founded in 2025)

- Founded: 2025
- Stadium: Sportpark Goed Genoeg, Amsterdam
- Capacity: 3,000
- Managing director: Marieke Visser
- Head coach: Ed Engelkes
- League: Vrouwen Eerste Divisie
- 2025–26: 10th
- Website: hera-united.nl
Home colours	Away colours

Hera United is a Dutch women's football club based in Amsterdam, North Holland that plays in the Vrouwen Eerste Divisie, the second level of women's football in the Netherlands. The club began play in the 2025–2026 Eredivisie season after taking over the license from Telstar. The club was relegated from the top-level Vrouwen Eredivisie after finishing in 10th place in its inaugural season. The club plays home matches at Sportpark Goed Genoeg.

== History ==
=== Formation ===
Marieke Visser, who worked in marketing, founded Hera as the first women's-only professional football club in the Netherlands. She said she was inspired to start a women's club by the success of Angel City FC in the U.S. and the lack of formal recognition of AFC Ajax's 2022–23 Eredivisie championship. Early partners and investors included Dutch television executive Susan van Geenen, sports television presenter Barbara Barend, and technology founder and investor Marijn Pijnenborg. The nascent club first met with the KNVB, the Dutch football association, in 2023. The group went public with their plans in March 2024, announcing their intent to have a club play at the Olympic Stadium in Amsterdam. In September 2025, Visser said the club would play one match in its first season at the Olympic Stadium.

The club is named after the Greek goddess Hera. The club's logo is a peacock, one of the goddess's sacred animals. The logo also has the club's name and founding year.

=== Telstar takeover ===
In July 2024, Hera announced a partnership with Telstar, an existing Eredivisie club that regularly was at the bottom of the standings, that could lead to Hera operating the Eredivisie club beginning in the 2025–26 season. This change required KNVB approval. Visser said at the time that Hera would play in Amsterdam, with derbies against Ajax. In December 2024, the KNVB approved a rule change allowing a women's-only club to field a professional team, a necessary step for Hera to take over the club. In June 2025, the KNVB approved additional needed rule changes. In August, the club announced it would play its home games at Sportpark Goed Genoeg in Amsterdam, the home field of men's third-division team Amsterdamsche FC, for the 2025–26 season. On 3 September, both teams and the Eredivise announced that Hera had taken over Telstar's license and place in the league. The two clubs would jointly operate a youth program, Hera-Telstar Opleidingen.

Ahead of the club's first season, coach Ed Engelkes, who had managed Telstar since February 2025, said the club kept what was good and talented from Telstar and that the team's goal was to avoid relegation from the Eredivisie, which meant finishing above the bottom three in the standings.

The club announced its first sponsors and advertisers on 5 September, days before its first match. Nike is its kit supplier, Booking.com is the sponsor on the front of the kit, and SportCity is the sponsor on the back of the kit.

=== 2025–2026: Relegation ===
The club secured its license, home park, and kits shortly before the start of the 2025–26 season. In its first match, Hera tied fellow North Holland club AZ in Alkmaar, 2–2, on 7 September. The club then lost four of its next five matches before winning its first match, defeating ADO Den Haag on 16 November. The club added two more draws before the winter break. In the second half of the season, Hera had a pair of two-game win streaks, beating Ajax and Excelsior in February, then SC Heerenveen and NAC Breda in April, but lost seven other matches.

The club was relegated from the Eredivisie to the Vrouwen Eerste Divisie on the final night of the season, conceding two late goals to FC Utrecht to lose 2–1 at home on 22 May. That night, ADO won to pass Hera in the league table and De Graafschap won an Eerste Divisie playoff to earn its promotion. Club management and head coach Engelkes had been critical of the KNVB's decision to contract the Eredivisie from 12 clubs to 10 and relegating three teams during the season.

In the KNVB Cup, Hera won three matches, defeating Klarenbeek, NAC, and Sparta, defeating the Rotterdam club on penalties, 7–6. Hera lost in the semi-finals to FC Twente, 3–0.

== Records ==
Season	League	Position	W – D – L = Pts	GF – GA	Top scorer	KNVB Cup	Refs
2025–26	Eredivisie	10 / 12	5 – 5 – 12 = 20	25 – 42	Jannette van Belen (7)	Semi-finals	
