= Fenna Kalma =

Dutch women's footballer (born 1999)

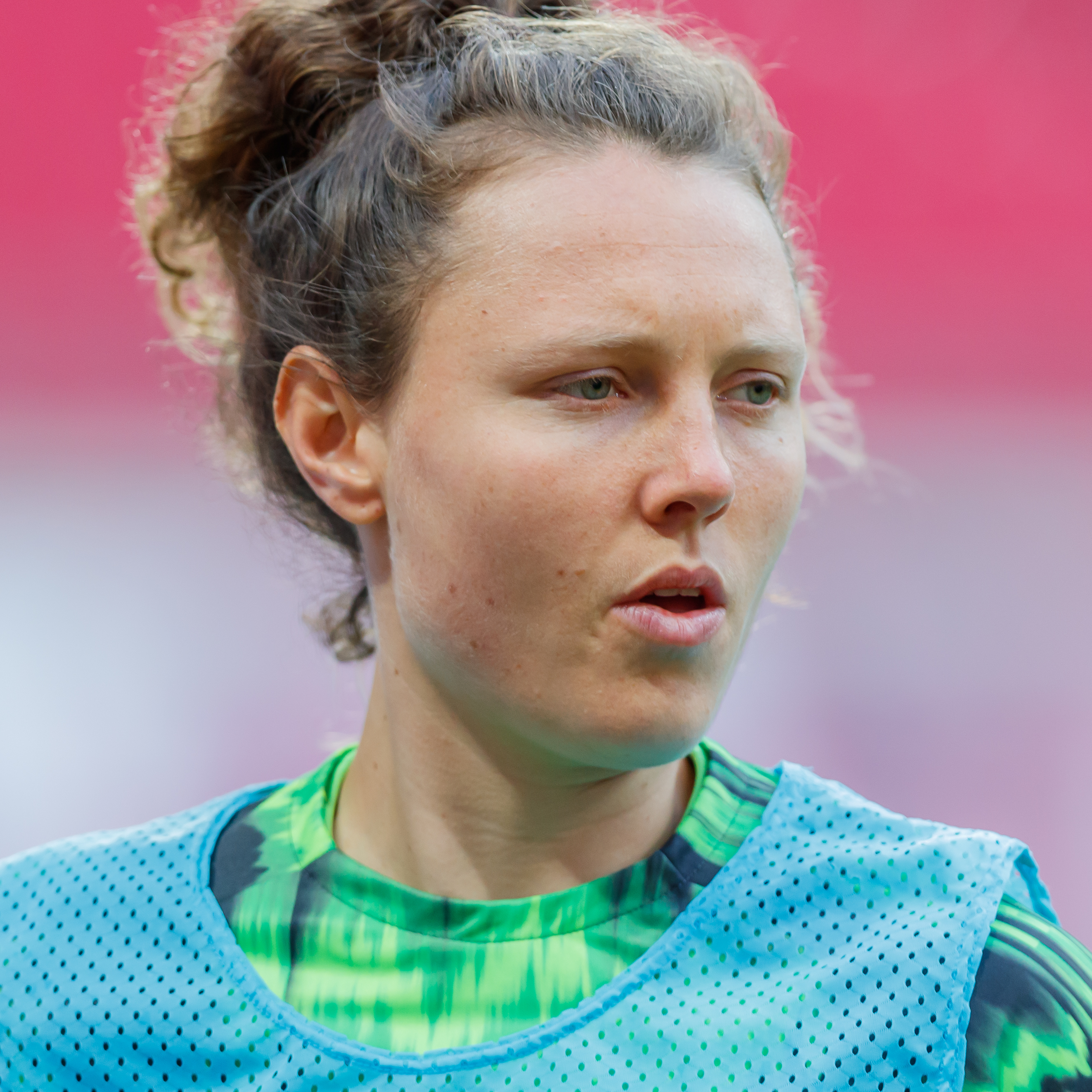
- Kalma with VfL Wolfsburg in 2023

Personal information
- Full name: Feikje Anna Kalma
- Date of birth: 21 November 1999 (age 26)
- Place of birth: Haskerhorne, Netherlands
- Height: 1.80 m (5 ft 11 in)
- Position: Striker

Team information
- Current team: PSV
- Number: 9

Youth career
- VV Oudehaske
- 2011–2014: VV Heerenveen
- 2014–2017: CTO Amsterdam

Senior career*
Years	Team	Apps	(Gls)
2017–2019	Heerenveen	51	(37)
2019–2023	Twente	75	(83)
2023–2025	VfL Wolfsburg	21	(3)
2025–	PSV	21	(9)

International career^{‡}
2015	Netherlands U16	6	(4)
2014–2016	Netherlands U17	8	(4)
2017–2018	Netherlands U19	15	(19)
2018	Netherlands U20	6	(4)
2019–2024	Netherlands U23	19	(18)
2022–	Netherlands	8	(2)
- * Club domestic league appearances and goals as of 22 May 2026 ‡ National team caps and goals as of 28 November 2024

Feikje Anna Kalma (born 21 November 1999) is a Dutch professional footballer who plays as a striker for Vrouwen Eredivisie club PSV Eindhoven and the Netherlands national team.

== Club career ==
A former player of CTO Amsterdam, Kalma joined Heerenveen in 2017. She made her debut for the club on 22 April 2017 in a 4–3 league defeat against Telstar.

Prior to the 2019–20 season, Kalma joined Twente. In 2021–22 season, she became the first player in Eredivisie history to score 30 league goals in a season. In May 2022, she extended her contract with Twente until June 2023. On 18 August 2022, she scored six goals in her team's 13–0 Champions League qualification round win against Moldovan club Agarista-ȘS Anenii Noi. In 2022 and 2023, she won the Eredivisie Player of the Year award and was the league's top goal scorer.

On 25 May 2023, German club VfL Wolfsburg announced the signing of Kalma on a three-year deal until June 2026. In January 2025, she joined PSV.

== International career ==
Kalma represented Netherlands at various youth levels. She was a member of the under-20 team at the 2018 FIFA U-20 Women's World Cup. With 18 goals, she is the all-time top scorer of the Netherlands under-23 team.

In September 2019, Kalma received her first call-up to the senior team for UEFA Women's Euro 2022 qualification matches. In May 2022, she was named as a stand-by player for the UEFA Women's Euro 2022. On 2 September 2022, she made her debut in a 2–1 friendly win against Scotland. She came on as a 62nd-minute substitute for Vivianne Miedema and scored her team's winning goal.

In May 2023, Kalma was named in Netherlands' provisional squad for the 2023 FIFA Women's World Cup, but she did not play in the tournament.

== Career statistics ==
=== Club ===
As of match played 5 August 2026

Appearances and goals by club, season and competition
Club	Season	League			National cup (Note: Includes KNVB Women's Cup, DFB-Pokal Frauen)		League cup		Continental		Other		Total	
Club	Season	Division	Apps	Goals	Apps	Goals	Apps	Goals	Apps	Goals	Apps	Goals	Apps	Goals
Heerenveen	2016–17	Vrouwen Eredivisie	6	3	N/A		—		—		—		6	3
Heerenveen	2017–18	Vrouwen Eredivisie	24	21	N/A		—		—		—		24	21
Heerenveen	2018–19	Vrouwen Eredivisie	21	13	N/A		—		—		—		21	13
Heerenveen	Total		51	37	0	0	0	0	0	0	0	0	51	37
Twente	2019–20	Vrouwen Eredivisie	11	9	1	3	5	3	7 (Note: Appearance(s) in UEFA Women's Champions League)	9	—		24	24
Twente	2020–21	Vrouwen Eredivisie	20	11	2	1	5	2	—		—		27	14
Twente	2021–22	Vrouwen Eredivisie	24	33	2	3	3	3	4	8	—		33	47
Twente	2022–23	Vrouwen Eredivisie	20	30	5	4	2	2	2	6	1 (Note: Appearance in Dutch Women's Super Cup)	1	30	43
Twente	Total		75	83	10	11	15	10	13	23	1	1	114	128
VfL Wolfsburg	2023–24	Frauen-Bundesliga	20	3	4	0	—		1	0	—		25	3
VfL Wolfsburg	2024–25	Frauen-Bundesliga	1	0	2	2	—		5	1	—		8	3
VfL Wolfsburg	Total		21	3	6	2	0	0	6	1	0	0	33	6
PSV	2024–25	Vrouwen Eredivisie	9	5	4	4	2	2	—		—		15	11
PSV	2025–26	Vrouwen Eredivisie	12	4	3	0	2	1	2	0	0	0	19	5
PSV	2026–27	Vrouwen Eredivisie	0	0	0	0	0	0	1	0	1	0	2	0
PSV	Total		21	9	7	4	4	3	3	0	1	0	36	16
Career total			168	132	23	17	19	13	22	24	2	1	234	187

=== International ===
As of match played 4 June 2024

Appearances and goals by national team and year
National team	Year	Apps	Goals
Netherlands	2022	4	2
Netherlands	2023	2	0
Netherlands	2024	2	0
Netherlands	2025	0	0
Total		8	2

Scores and results list Netherlands' goal tally first, score column indicates score after each Kalma goal.

List of international goals scored by Fenna Kalma
No.	Date	Venue	Opponent	Score	Result	Competition
1	2 September 2022	MAC³PARK Stadion, Zwolle, Netherlands	Scotland	2–1	2–1	Friendly
2	11 November 2022	Stadion Galgenwaard, Utrecht, Netherlands	Costa Rica	3–0	4–0	Friendly

== Honours ==
Twente

- Vrouwen Eredivisie: 2020–21, 2021–22
- KNVB Women's Cup: 2022–23
- Eredivisie Cup: 2019–20, 2021–22, 2022–23
- Dutch Women's Super Cup: 2022

VfL Wolfsburg

- DFB-Pokal Frauen: 2023–24

PSV

- Vrouwen Eredivisie: 2025–26
- Eredivisie Cup: 2024–25, 2025–26
- Dutch Women's Super Cup: 2026

Individual

- IFFHS World's Best Top Goal Scorer: 2022
- Eredivisie Player of the Year: 2021–22, 2022–23
- Vrouwen Eredivisie top goalscorer: 2021–22, 2022–23
- KNVB Women's Cup top goalscorer: 2024–25
- Eredivisie Cup top goalscorer: 2022–23
