= Akari Takeshige =

Japanese footballer (born 2003)

Akari Takeshige 竹重 杏歌理
Personal information
- Date of birth: 15 January 2003 (age 23)
- Place of birth: Aichi Prefecture, Japan
- Height: 1.72 m (5 ft 8 in)
- Position: Defender

Team information
- Current team: Feyenoord
- Number: 3

Senior career*
Years	Team	Apps	(Gls)
2021–2024	INAC Kobe Leonessa	46	(3)
2024–2025	Telstar	21	(3)
2025–	Feyenoord	14	(2)
- * Club domestic league appearances and goals as of 05:51, 27 March 2026 (UTC)

Akari Takeshige (竹重 杏歌理, Takeshige Akari; born 15 January 2003) is a Japanese professional footballer who plays as a defender for Vrouwen Eredivisie club Feyenoord.

== Club career ==
Takeshige made her WE League debut for INAC Kobe Leonessa on 12 September 2021 and scored her first goal on 7 November 2021. She played for INAC Kobe Leonessa for three seasons.

Prior to the 2024–2025 season, Takeshige signed with Telstar of the women's Eredivisie for two seasons. She scored her first goal on 5 October 2024, her second match in the Netherlands.
