= NAC Breda (women) =

Dutch professional football club (founded 2024)

NAC Breda Vrouwen
- Founded: 1 July 2024
- Ground: Rat Verlegh Stadion
- Women's football manager: Claudine van Vlimmeren
- Coach: Deepak Mohanlal
- League: Vrouwen Eredivisie
- 2025–26: 12th
- Website: NAC.nl
Home colours

NAC Breda Vrouwen is a Dutch women's football team based in Breda, North Brabant that competes in the Vrouwen Eerste divisie, the second division of club women's football in the Netherlands. The team is affiliated with men's club NAC Breda and began play in the 2024–25 season in the Eerste Divisie. The team was promoted to the top-level Vrouwen Eredivisie in mid-2025 following the dissolution of the Fortuna Sittard women's team but was relegated after finish in last place.

The team plays its home matches at Rat Verlegh Stadion and the smaller Sportpark Heksenwiel.

The team lost its first three Eredivisie matches before earning a draw on 5 October against Hera United in Amsterdam.

== Season results ==
Season	Division	Matches	Wins	Draws	Losses	Points	GF	GA	Rank	Qualification	KNVB Beker	Eredivisie Cup	Notes
2024–25 (autumn)	Eerste divisie B	12	10	2	0	32	30	7	1st	Eerste divisie A	Quarterfinal	n/a	First women's football competition
2024–25 (spring)	Eerste divisie A	14	8	2	4	26	27	19	3rd	Eredivisie	Quarterfinal	n/a	Joined Eredivisie following Fortuna Sittard's withdrawal
2025–26	Eredivisie												First season in Eredivisie

== Top scorers ==
- 2024–2025: (Netherlands) Brigitte Franken (20)

== Management ==
Head coach:

- 2024–2025: (Netherlands) Richard Mank
- 2025–2026: (Netherlands) Jan de Hoon
- 2026–present: Deepak Mohanlal

Women's football manager:

- (Netherlands) Pia Rijsdijk (2024–2026)
- Claudine van Vlimmeren (2026–present)
