= Mia Schmid =

Swiss footballer (born 2005)

Personal information
- Full name: Mia Ewa Schmid
- Date of birth: 29 April 2005 (age 21)
- Place of birth: Zollikon, Switzerland
- Height: 1.73 m (5 ft 8 in)
- Position: Defender

Team information
- Current team: Feyenoord

Youth career
- –2023: Grasshopper Club Zurich

Senior career*
Years	Team	Apps	(Gls)
2022–2023	Grasshopper Club Zurich	3	(0)
2023–2026	Turbine Potsdam	61	(3)
2026–	Feyenoord	0	(0)
- * Club domestic league appearances and goals as of 25 July 2026

Mia Ewa Schmid (born 29 April 2005) is a Swiss footballer who plays as a midfielder who plays for Eredivisie club Feyenoord.
