= Sara Thrige =

Danish footballer (born 1996)

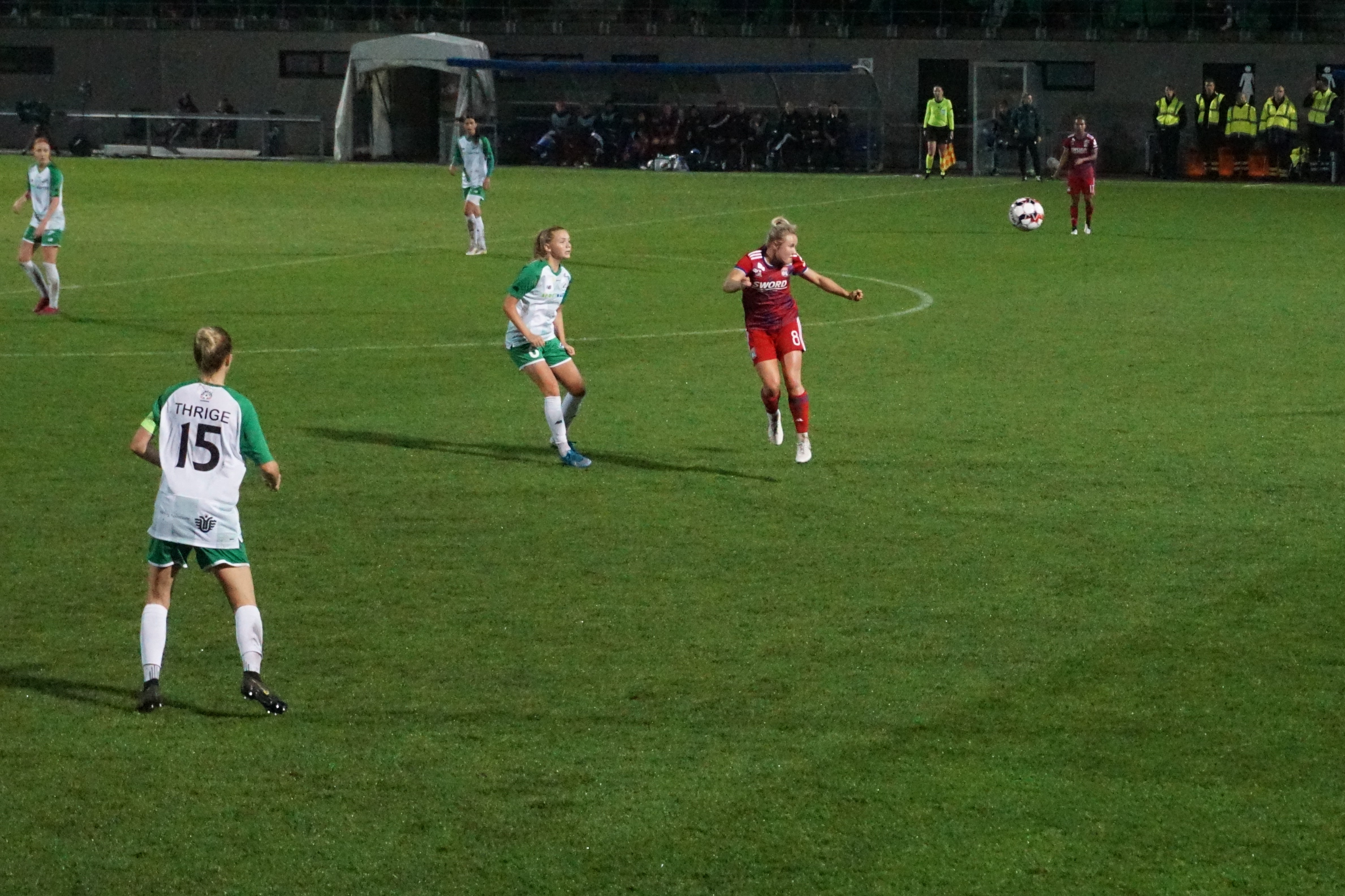
- Sara Thrige (no. 15) in action for Fortuna Hjørring against Olympique Lyon in the Champions League, 2019

Personal information
- Full name: Sara Gedsted Thrige Andersen
- Date of birth: 15 May 1996 (age 30)
- Place of birth: Farsø, Denmark
- Height: 1.67 m (5 ft 6 in)
- Position: Defender

Team information
- Current team: PSV
- Number: 2

Youth career
- 2000–2010: Farsø/Ullits IK

Senior career*
Years	Team	Apps	(Gls)
2010–2015	Team Viborg		
2015–2017	Kolding IF		
2017–2021	Fortuna Hjørring	81	(11)
2021–2024	AC Milan	45	(3)
2024–	PSV	1	(0)

International career^{‡}
2012	Denmark U16	4	(0)
2012-2013	Denmark U17	10	(1)
2013-2015	Denmark U19	24	(4)
2015-2018	Denmark U23	4	(0)
2016-	Denmark	27	(2)
- * Club domestic league appearances and goals as of 29 January 2024 ‡ National team caps and goals as of 29 January 2024

Sara Gedsted Thrige Andersen (born 15 May 1996) is a Danish professional footballer who plays as a defender for Dutch Eredivisie club PSV and the Denmark national team. With both club and country, she usually operates as a right wing-back.

== Club career ==
On 23 January 2024, Thrige signed a one-and-a-half-year contract with PSV. Five days later she made her debut for PSV in the 3–1 win to ADO Den Haag.

== International career ==
Thrige was called up to the senior national team in October 2016 for a training tournament in China. She took over the spot of Karoline Smidt Nielsen, who suffered an injury.

Thrige appeared for the team during the UEFA Euro 2021 qualifying cycle.

== International goals ==
No.	Date	Venue	Opponent	Score	Result	Competition
1.	8 April 2021	Viborg Stadium, Viborg, Denmark	Malta	7–0	7–0	2023 FIFA Women's World Cup qualification
2.	21 October 2021	Viborg Stadium, Viborg, Denmark	Bosnia and Herzegovina	8–0	8–0	2023 FIFA Women's World Cup qualification

== Personal life ==
Sara Thrige has a twin sister Sofie Thrige, who plays for A-Liga club OB Q.
