= Shanique Dessing =

Dutch footballer (born 2000)

Personal information
- Full name: Shanique Dessing
- Date of birth: 31 December 2000 (age 25)
- Place of birth: Delft, Netherlands
- Position: Forward

Team information
- Current team: AZ Alkmaar
- Number: 18

Youth career
- ADO Den Haag

Senior career*
Years	Team	Apps	(Gls)
2017–2022	ADO Den Haag	44	(4)
2022–2025	PSV	29	(2)
2024	→ ADO Den Haag (loan)	11	(2)
2025–	AZ Alkmaar		

International career
2017	Netherlands U17	4	(0)
2021	Netherlands U23	1	(0)
- * Club domestic league appearances and goals as of 17 May 2025

Shanique Dessing (born 31 December 2000) is a Dutch professional footballer who plays as a forward for Eredivisie club AZ Alkmaar.

== Club career ==
=== First spell at ADO Den Haag ===
Shanique began her career with ADO Den Haag in 2017 after being transferred to its main team; beforehand, she played 38 matches for their Promise team, scoring 12 goals. She made her league debut against VV Alkmaar on 17 March 2017. She scored her first league goal against VV Alkmaar on 17 November 2017, scoring in the 34th minute. In 2020, she signed a contract with the team that would last until mid-2022.

=== PSV ===
Dessing was announced at PSV on 7 April 2022. She made her league debut against Fortuna Sittard on 15 October 2022.

Dessing also appeared for Jong PSV, making her KNVB Cup debut for Jong PSV on 17 March 2023.

=== Second spell at ADO Den Haag ===
Dessing was announced at ADO Den Haag on loan on 11 January 2024. She scored on her league debut against Utrecht on 20 January 2024, scoring in the 68th minute.

== Personal life ==
Dessing was born in Delft. As of 2020, she is studying business economics at Erasmus University Rotterdam.

== Honours ==
PSV

- Eredivisie Cup: 2024–25
