= Celainy Obispo =

Curaçaoan footballer (born 2000)

Personal information
- Date of birth: 5 October 2000 (age 26)
- Place of birth: Netherlands
- Position: Defender

Team information
- Current team: Hamburger SV
- Number: 5

Senior career*
Years	Team	Apps	(Gls)
2018–2021	ADO Den Haag		
2021–2026	Feyenoord	105	(10)
2026–	Hamburger SV	1	(0)

International career
- Curaçao
- * Club domestic league appearances and goals as of 6 September 2026

Celainy Obispo (born 5 October 2000) is a footballer who plays as a defender for Frauen-Bundesliga club Hamburger SV. Born in the mainland Netherlands, she is a Curaçao international. She has previously played for Vrouwen Eredivisie club Feyenoord.

== Club career ==
Obispo was born in 2000 in the Netherlands. She started playing football at the age of five, starting her career with Dutch side ADO Den Haag. In 2021, she signed for Dutch side Feyenoord, where she eventually ascended to the role of team captain. She became the first-ever player to make 100 league appearances for Feyenoord.

On 28 June 2026, Obispo signed for German club Hamburger SV.

== Style of play ==
Obispo mainly operates as a defender. She is known for her heading ability.

== Personal life ==
Obispo is a native of Rotterdam, the Netherlands. She has regarded Brazil international Marcelo as her football idol.
