= Tiny Hoekstra =

Dutch footballer (born 1996)

Personal information
- Date of birth: 15 September 1996 (age 30)
- Place of birth: Rinsumageast, Netherlands
- Position: Forward

Youth career
- VCR Rinsumageest

Senior career*
Years	Team	Apps	(Gls)
2012–2021	Heerenveen	173	(63)
2021–2025	Ajax	79	(39)
Total		252	(102)

International career
2012–2013	Netherlands U17	4	(0)
2014–2015	Netherlands U19	12	(1)
2019–2023	Netherlands U23	6	(1)
- * Club domestic league appearances and goals

Tiny Hoekstra (born 15 September 1996) is a Dutch former footballer who played as a forward. She played for Heerenveen and Ajax during her club career and represented Netherlands at youth international level.

== Club career ==
Hoekstra started her youth career with VCR Rinsumageest, before moving to Heerenveen. She made her senior club debut for Heerenveen in the 2012–13 BeNe League, and scored on her home debut against Utrecht. In October 2018, she was prevented from doing a post-match interview in Frisian, and told that all interviews must be done in Dutch. In April 2019, she scored six goals in a match against Achilles '29; which resulted in a 12–0 win for Heerenveen. She was the top scorer in the 2018–19 Eredivisie with 27 goals.

In May 2020, Hoekstra signed a one-year contract extension with Heerenveen. In October 2020, she was critical of the Royal Dutch Football Association (KNVB) for suspending the 2020–21 Eredivisie for a month due to the COVID-19 pandemic. She made 12 appearances in the 2020–21 Eredivisie, scoring two goals. One of the goals was against Ajax.

In May 2021, Hoekstra announced a move to Ajax on a one-year contract, for the 2021–22 Eredivisie. On 5 June 2022, she scored in the final of the Eredivisie Cup as Ajax lost 4–3 to Twente. In August 2023, she extended her contract with Ajax until June 2025. She retired from professional football in May 2025.

== International career ==
Hoekstra has played for the Netherlands under-17, under-19 and under-23 teams. She scored for Netherlands under-19s in a 2015 UEFA Women's Under-19 Championship qualification match against Slovenia.

In February 2023, Hoekstra received her first call-up to the Netherlands national team. On 31 May 2023, she was named in the provisional squad for the 2023 FIFA Women's World Cup.

== Honours ==
Ajax

- Vrouwen Eredivisie: 2022–23
- KNVB Women's Cup: 2021–22, 2023–24

Individual

- Vrouwen Eredivisie top scorer: 2018–19
- Eredivisie Cup top goalscorer: 2020–21
