= 2022–23 Eredivisie (women) =

Season of Dutch professional women's soccer

Eredivisie Vrouwen
- Season: 2022–23
- Dates: 16 September 2022 – 7 May 2023
- Champions: Ajax
- Women's Champions League: Ajax; Twente
- Matches: 110
- Goals: 388 (3.53 per match)
- Best Player: (Netherlands) Fenna Kalma
- Top goalscorer: (Netherlands) Fenna Kalma (30 goals)
- Biggest home win: Twente 9–0 Excelsior (20 November 2022)
- Biggest away win: Heerenveen 0–9 Twente (16 October 2022)
- Longest winning run: 14 - Twente
- Longest unbeaten run: 14 - Twente
- Longest winless run: 14 - Excelsior
- Longest losing run: 11 - Excelsior
- Total attendance: 104,954

The 2022–23 Eredivisie Vrouwen is the thirteenth season of the Netherlands women's professional football league. Ajax won the league title, its third. The season saw Fortuna Sittard and Telstar enter the league, which grew to 11 teams.

Twente's Fenna Kalma repeated as the top goal scorer and Player of the Year. Esmee Brugts of PSV was named the Talent of the Year.

== Format ==
Each team played all other teams twice over 22 rounds, with one team having a bye each round due to the odd number of teams in the league.

== Teams ==
Location of teams in the Eredivisie Vrouwen 2022–23

Fortuna Sittard and Telstar joined the league, expanding it to 11 teams. Fortuna joined the league for the first time, while Telstar returned after last playing in the 2016–17 season.

Team	City / Town	Venue(s)	Capacity
ADO Den Haag	Den Haag	Bingoal Stadion	15,000
AFC Ajax	Amsterdam	Sportpark De Toekomst	5,000
VV Alkmaar	Alkmaar	Sportpark AFC '34	2,500
Excelsior	Rotterdam	Van Donge & De Roo Stadion	4,500
Feyenoord	Rotterdam	Sportcomplex Varkenoord	2,500
Fortuna Sittard	Sittard	Fortuna Sittard Stadion	12,500
sc Heerenveen	Heerenveen	Sportpark Skoatterwâld	3,000
sc Heerenveen	Heerenveen	Sportcomplex Nieuwehorne (Nieuwehorne)	1,000
PEC Zwolle	Zwolle	MAC³PARK Stadion	14,000
PEC Zwolle	Zwolle	Sportpark De Vegtlust	3,000
PSV	Eindhoven	Philips Stadion	35,119
PSV	Eindhoven	Sportcomplex De Herdgang	2,500
Telstar	Velsen	BUKO Stadion (Velsen)	5,200
FC Twente	Enschede	De Grolsch Veste	30,205
FC Twente	Enschede	Sportpark Het Diekman	4,000

Source: Soccerway, Football Reference

== Standings ==
Pos	Team	Pld	W	D	L	GF	GA	GD	Pts	Qualification
1	Ajax (C)	20	18	1	1	67	15	+52	55	UEFA Champions League first qualifying round
2	Twente	20	18	0	2	81	6	+75	54	UEFA Champions League first qualifying round
3	Fortuna Sittard	20	11	3	6	49	27	+22	36	
4	PSV	20	11	2	7	36	23	+13	35	
5	ADO Den Haag	20	10	2	8	42	21	+21	32	
6	PEC Zwolle	20	7	5	8	26	37	−11	26	
7	Feyenoord	20	6	6	8	18	24	−6	24	
8	Heerenveen	20	7	1	12	24	56	−32	22	
9	Alkmaar	20	3	3	14	11	55	−44	12	
10	Telstar	20	3	3	14	18	65	−47	12	
11	Excelsior	20	2	2	16	14	57	−43	8	

Source: Soccerway
Rules for classification: Season in progress: 1) Most points won; 2) Less points lost; 3) Goal difference; 4) Goals scored; 5) Alphabetical order; End of season: 1) Points; 2) Goal difference; 3) Goals scored; 4) Head-to-head points; 5) Head-to-head goal difference; 6) Head-to-head away goals scored; 7) Play-off if relevant for deciding champion otherwise by draw. 8) Penalty shoot-out (only after a play-off)
(C) Champions

== Results ==
Home \ Away	ADO	AJA	ALK	EXC	FEY	FOR	HEE	PEC	PSV	TEL	TWE
ADO Den Haag		0–3	5–0	2–0	0–2	1–0	3–0	2–2	1–2	4–0	0–1
Ajax	3–2		5–0	3–1	1–1	4–0	7–0	2–0	1–0	1–0	1–0
Alkmaar	0–3	1–6		1–3	0–0	1–1	1–3	0–1	0–2	1–2	0–5
Excelsior	0–6	0–3	1–2		1–0	0–5	0–2	2–2	1–3	2–2	0–3
Feyenoord	1–0	0–4	3–0	2–1		0–4	1–2	1–1	1–1	2–1	0–1
Fortuna Sittard	3–0	1–2	4–0	3–1	0–1		5–1	2–2	0–1	2–2	2–1
Heerenveen	0–5	2–5	2–2	1–0	1–0	1–3		1–2	0–2	4–1	0–9
PEC Zwolle	0–3	1–6	0–1	2–0	0–0	2–5	2–0		4–0	1–0	0–2
PSV	1–1	1–2	4–0	4–0	3–1	0–2	1–0	4–0		6–1	0–3
Telstar	1–4	2–7	0–1	2–1	1–1	1–7	0–4	0–4	2–0		0–4
Twente	2–0	3–1	5–0	9–0	2–1	6–0	7–0	6–0	3–1	9–0	

Source: Soccerway
Legend: Blue = home team win; Yellow = draw; Red = away team win.

== Statistics ==
=== Top scorers ===
As of 7 May 2023

Rank	Player	Club	Goals
1	(Netherlands) Fenna Kalma	Twente	30
2	(Belgium) Tessa Wullaert	Fortuna Sittard	20
3	(Netherlands) Romée Leuchter	Ajax	18
4	(Netherlands) Tiny Hoekstra	Ajax	14
5	(Netherlands) Liz Rijsbergen	ADO Den Haag	11
6	(Netherlands) Janneke Ennema	sc Heerenveen	10
6	(Netherlands) Jaimy Ravensbergen	ADO Den Haag	10
8	(Belgium) Elena Dhont	Twente	8
8	(Netherlands) Esmee Brugts	PSV	8
10	(Netherlands) Renate Jansen	Twente	7
10	(Netherlands) Evi Maatman	PEC Zwolle	7
