= Venla Lindfors =

Finnish footballer (born 2003)

Personal information
- Date of birth: 9 October 2003 (age 23)
- Place of birth: Finland
- Position: Midfielder

Team information
- Current team: Bologna

Youth career
- EPS
- –2016: Honka
- 2016–2019: EBK
- 2019–2020: Hammarby

Senior career*
Years	Team	Apps	(Gls)
2020–2021	Honka	11	(0)
2021	→ PKKU (loan)	8	(2)
2022–2024	Lidköping	51	(3)
2025	Fortuna Sittard	11	(3)
2025–	Bologna	0	(0)

International career^{‡}
2021	Finland U19	1	(0)
2023–	Finland U23	2	(0)
- * Club domestic league appearances and goals as of 30 December 2024 ‡ National team caps and goals as of 30 December 2024

Venla Lindfors, née Orkamo, (born 9 October 2003) is a Finnish professional footballer who plays as a midfielder for Serie B club Bologna.
