= 2021–22 Eredivisie (women) =

Eredivisie Vrouwen
- Season: 2021–22
- Dates: 27 August 2021 – 20 May 2022
- Champions: FC Twente
- Women's Champions League: Twente; Ajax
- Matches: 108
- Goals: 392 (3.63 per match)
- Best Player: (Netherlands) Fenna Kalma
- Top goalscorer: (Netherlands) Fenna Kalma (33 goals)
- Biggest home win: Twente 8–0 Alkmaar (27 August 2021); Twente 8–0 Heerenveen (29 October 2021)
- Biggest away win: Excelsior 1–9 Twente (19 December 2021)
- Highest scoring: Excelsior 1–9 Twente (19 December 2021); Excelsior 2–8 Ajax (24 April 2022)
- Longest winning run: 13 matches Twente
- Longest unbeaten run: 20 matches Twente
- Longest winless run: 9 matches Excelsior
- Longest losing run: 6 matches Excelsior
- All statistics correct as of 20 May 2022.

The 2021–22 Eredivisie Vrouwen was the twelfth season of the Netherlands women's professional football league. Defending champions Twente won the league title for the third time in a row. The season saw Feyenoord entering the league, which expanded to nine teams. Feyenoord's final home game of the season, against AFC Ajax, attracted 14,618 fans, more than four times any other match in the season.

Twente's Fenna Kalma, the top goal scorer for the season, was named the Women's Eredivisie Player of the Year. Her teammate Wieke Kaptein was named Talent of the Year.

== Format ==
The league changed its format, dropped the split-season scheduling used for several years. All nine teams played each teams three times. Because of the odd number of teams, one team had a bye each round. The league stated that the change was to increase the number of games each team played and reduce the gap between the Eredivisie and top foreign women's leagues. The top two teams qualified for the UEFA Women's Champions League.

== Teams ==
Location of teams in the Eredivisie Vrouwen 2021–22

Four years after creating its women's program, Feyenoord joined the league, expanding the league to nine teams.

Team	City / Town	Venue(s)	Capacity
ADO Den Haag	Den Haag	Cars Jeans Stadion	15,000
ADO Den Haag	Den Haag	Sportpark Prinses Irene	3,000
AFC Ajax	Amsterdam	Sportpark De Toekomst	5,000
VV Alkmaar	Alkmaar	Sportpark AFC '34	2,500
Excelsior	Rotterdam	Van Donge & De Roo Stadion	4,500
Feyenoord	Rotterdam	Sportcomplex Varkenoord	2,500
Feyenoord	Rotterdam	De Kuip	47,500
SC Heerenveen	Heerenveen	Sportpark Skoatterwâld	3,000
SC Heerenveen	Heerenveen	Abe Lenstra Stadion	27,224
PEC Zwolle	Zwolle	MAC³PARK Stadion	14,000
PEC Zwolle	Zwolle	Sportpark Be Quick '28	3,000
PSV Eindhoven	Eindhoven	Sportcomplex De Herdgang	2,500
FC Twente	Enschede	De Grolsch Veste	30,205
FC Twente	Enschede	Sportpark Het Diekman	4,000

Source: Soccerway, Football Reference

== Standings ==
Pos	Team	Pld	W	D	L	GF	GA	GD	Pts	Qualification
1	Twente (C)	24	19	3	2	95	26	+69	60	UEFA Champions League first qualifying round
2	Ajax	24	17	3	4	70	22	+48	54	UEFA Champions League first qualifying round
3	PSV	24	13	4	7	35	29	+6	43	
4	ADO Den Haag	24	11	6	7	49	32	+17	39	
5	Feyenoord	24	10	5	9	32	40	−8	35	
6	PEC Zwolle	24	8	4	12	33	46	−13	28	
7	Heerenveen	24	4	6	14	21	46	−25	18	
8	Alkmaar	24	5	2	17	29	68	−39	17	
9	Excelsior	24	2	5	17	28	83	−55	11	

Source: Soccerway
Rules for classification: Season in progress: 1) Most points won; 2) Less points lost; 3) Goal difference; 4) Goals scored; 5) Alphabetical order; End of season: 1) Points; 2) Goal difference; 3) Goals scored; 4) Head-to-head points; 5) Head-to-head goal difference; 6) Head-to-head away goals scored; 7) Play-off if relevant for deciding champion otherwise by draw. 8) Penalty shoot-out (only after a play-off)
(C) Champions

== Results ==
Home \ Away	ADO	AJA	ALK	EXC	FEY	HEE	PEC	PSV	TWE	ADO	AJA	ALK	EXC	FEY	HEE	PEC	PSV	TWE
ADO Den Haag		0–0	3–1	4–2	1–1	1–0	0–2	1–0	4–4		1–1	5–1				2–0		1–3
Ajax	2–1		5–0	2–0	2–0	2–1	3–0	5–1	0–1			2–0				7–0	0–0	2–3
Alkmaar	1–0	1–4		5–1	1–2	0–0	3–1	1–3	1–5				2–2	1–3	3–2		2–3	
Excelsior	0–5	1–7	2–1		1–2	2–2	2–1	3–3	1–9	3–4	2–8					1–2		0–5
Feyenoord	1–1	4–1	2–1	3–2		2–2	1–0	2–1	0–0	0–5	1–4		2–0			2–2		
Heerenveen	1–0	0–4	3–0	1–1	0–1		1–1	0–1	0–2	0–4	0–2		3–0	2–0				
PEC Zwolle	3–0	1–3	2–3	3–0	2–1	3–1		1–1	1–4			2–1			1–1		0–2	1–3
PSV	2–1	1–2	1–0	1–0	1–0	4–1	3–0		2–1	0–1			1–1	2–1	1–0			
Twente	4–4	3–2	8–0	7–1	2–1	8–0	1–4	3–1				7–0		6–0	3–0		3–0	

Source: Soccerway
Legend: Blue = home team win; Yellow = draw; Red = away team win.

== Statistics ==
=== Top scorers ===
Rank	Player	Club	Games	Goals	Penalties	Avg.
1.	(Netherlands) Fenna Kalma	Twente	24	33	3	1.38
2.	(Netherlands) Romée Leuchter	Ajax	24	25	3	1.04
3.	(Netherlands) Renate Jansen	Twente	23	17	0	0.74
4.	(Netherlands) Kayleigh van Dooren	Twente	24	13	0	0.54
5.	(Netherlands) Jaimy Ravensbergen	ADO Den Haag	24	11	0	0.46
6.	(Netherlands) Sanne Koopman	VV Alkmaar	23	10	0	0.43
6.	(Netherlands) Chasity Grant	Ajax	24	10	0	0.42
6.	(Netherlands) Desiree van Lunteren	PSV	24	10	5	0.42
9.	(Netherlands) Liz Rijsbergen	ADO Den Haag	23	8	0	0.35
10.	(Netherlands) Nikita Tromp	Ajax	16	7	0	0.44
10.	(Germany) Anna-Lena Stolze	Twente	22	7	0	0.32
10.	(Netherlands) Chimera Ripa	Heerenveen	22	7	0	0.32
10.	(Tunisia) Sabrine Ellouzi	Excelsior	23	7	2	0.3

Source: Soccerway

=== Hat-tricks(+) ===
Rnd.	Player	Club	Goals	Date	Home	Score	Away
5	(Netherlands) Fenna Kalma	Twente	3', 34', 50', 78'	1 Oct 2021	Twente	7 – 1	Excelsior
7	(Netherlands) Jaimy Ravensbergen	ADO Den Haag	4', 41', 78'	17 Oct 2021	ADO Den Haag	4 – 4	Twente
8	(Netherlands) Fenna Kalma	Twente	31', 38', 69', 76'	29 Oct 2021	Twente	8 – 0	Heerenveen
8	(Netherlands) Renate Jansen	Twente	7', 26', 55'	29 Oct 2021	Twente	8 – 0	Heerenveen
14	(Netherlands) Fenna Kalma	Twente	50', 72', 85'	19 Dec 2021	Excelsior	1 – 9	Twente
20	(Netherlands) Fenna Kalma	Twente	49', 90', 90+3'	13 Mar 2022	Twente	6 – 0	Feyenoord
21	(Netherlands) Jannette van Belen	ADO Den Haag	24', 26', 61'	25 Mar 2022	Heerenveen	0 – 4	ADO Den Haag
23	(Netherlands) Romée Leuchter	Ajax	6', 34', 55', 90'	24 Apr 2022	Excelsior	2 – 8	Ajax
