= Renate Jansen =

Dutch footballer (born 1990)

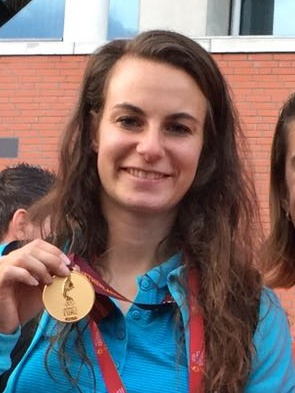
- Jansen in 2017

Personal information
- Date of birth: 7 December 1990 (age 35)
- Place of birth: Abbenes, Netherlands
- Height: 1.78 m (5 ft 10 in)
- Position: Striker

Youth career
- 1995–2005: SV Abbenes
- 2005–2007: VV Kagia
- 2007–2008: Ter Leede / HvA

Senior career*
Years	Team	Apps	(Gls)
2008–2015	ADO Den Haag	240	(130)
2015–2024	Twente	154	(85)
2024–2026	PSV	41	(19)

International career
2005	Netherlands U15	5	(0)
2005–2007	Netherlands U17	23	(2)
2007–2009	Netherlands U19	17	(3)
2010–2025	Netherlands	72	(8)
Medal record
Women's football
Representing the Netherlands
FIFA Women's World Cup
Runner-up	2019 France
UEFA Women's Championship
Winner	2017 Netherlands
- * Club domestic league appearances and goals as of 00:15, 22 November 2022 (UTC)

Renate Jansen (born 7 December 1990) is a Dutch former professional footballer who played as a striker. She has scored the most goals in the history of the top Dutch women's league.

== Club career ==
Jansen's career started at the youth teams of SV Abbenes in her native Abbenes. In 2005, she started to play in the B1 (boys team) of VV Kagia in Lisserbroek. In 2007, she left the club and joined Ter Leede, and later joined HvA.

=== ADO Den Haag ===
In the summer of 2008, she signed with ADO Den Haag of the Eredivisie. In the 2011–12 season, her team won the double, winning the league and the KNVB Women's Cup. The next season, the new BeNe League, with clubs from Belgium and the Netherlands, replaced the national leagues of both countries. That season, Jansen scored during her UEFA Women's Champions League debut match against Rossiyanka.

On 19 April 2014, she played her 150th official match for ADO (131 league, 16 cup, 2 Champions League, and 1 BeNe Super Cup) against FC Twente; since her club debut on 21 August 2008, she had missed just three matches and scored 87 goals (71 league, 15 cup, and 1 Champions League).

=== FC Twente ===
After seven seasons at ADO, where she scored 109 goals in 181 games in all competitions, she joined FC Twente in the summer of 2015. Twente won the league title in her first season, 2015–16. She was third on her team and in the league in goal scored, with 13. She was second the Eredivisie in goals scored in 2020–21 with 12 goals and third the following year with 17 goals. She also scored 14 goals in 29 Champions League matches with the Eschede club.

On 10 April 2024, Jansen announced she would leave the club at the end of the season, hoping to play for a club in another country.

=== PSV ===
In June 2024, Jansen signed a two-year contract with PSV, arriving from Twente on a free transfer. At the end of the season, she was named Eredivisie Player of the Year.

== International career ==
Jansen made her debut for the Dutch national team on 1 April 2010 against Slovakia. She was part of training camps with the national team and played in friendlies until 2017, when she was included in the squad for the 2017 Algarve Cup. Her big break into a major tournament coming soon after, as she was selected for the UEFA Women's Euro 2017, where she played four matches, coming in as a substitute in the tournament won by the Dutch.

After the tournament, the entire team was honoured by the Prime Minister Mark Rutte and Minister of Sport Edith Schippers and made Knights of the Order of Orange-Nassau.

She appeared in one match in the 2019 FIFA Women's World Cup, coming on as a substitute in the 87th minute in a victory over Canada.

On 31 May 2023, she was named as part of the Netherlands provisional squad for the 2023 FIFA Women's World Cup. In September 2023, Jansen scored the winning goal in the 90th minute against England in the UEFA Women's Nations League, keeping the Dutch team's chances alive in the tournament.

=== International goals ===
Scores and results list the Netherlands goal tally first.

Goal	Date	Venue	Opponent	Score	Result	Competition
1.	20 May 2015	Sparta Stadion, Rotterdam, Netherlands	Estonia	6–0	7–0	Friendly
2.	20 May 2015	Sparta Stadion, Rotterdam, Netherlands	Estonia	7–0	7–0	Friendly
3.	1 March 2017	Estádio Municipal de Albufeira, Albufeira, Portugal	China	1–0	1–0	2017 Algarve Cup
4.	18 February 2021	King Baudouin Stadium, Brussels, Belgium	Belgium	6–1	6–1	Friendly
5.	26 September 2023	Stadion Galgenwaard, Utrecht, Netherlands	England	2–1	2–1	2023–24 UEFA Women's Nations League
6.	26 October 2024	De Vijverberg, Doetinchem, Netherlands	Indonesia	11–0	15–0	Friendly
7.	26 October 2024	De Vijverberg, Doetinchem, Netherlands	Indonesia	13–0	15–0	Friendly
8.	26 October 2024	De Vijverberg, Doetinchem, Netherlands	Indonesia	15–0	15–0	Friendly

== Honours ==
ADO Den Haag

- Eredivisie: 2011–12
- Dutch Cup: 2011–12, 2012–13

FC Twente

- Eredivisie: 2015–16, 2018–19, 2020–21, 2021–22, 2023–24

Netherlands

- UEFA Women's Euro: 2017
- Algarve Cup: 2018

Individual

- Knight of the Order of Orange-Nassau: 2017
- Eredivisie Player of the Year: 2024–25
