= Fortuna Sittard (women) =

Dutch women's football (soccer) club (2022–2025)

- Full name: Fortuna Sittard Vrouwen
- Founded: 2022
- Dissolved: 2025
- Ground: Fortuna Sittard Stadion
- 2024–25: Eredivisie, 8th of 12
- Website: FortunaSittard.nl
Home colours	Away colours

Fortuna Sittard Vrouwen (Dutch: [fɔrˈtynaː ˈsɪtɑrt ˈvrɑu̯ə(n)]; Limburgish: Fortuna Zitterd Vrouwe [fɔʀˈtyːnaː ˈzɪtəʀt ˈvrɑu̯ə]) was a Dutch women's football team from Sittard, province of Limburg, that competed in the Vrouwen Eredivisie from 2022 to 2025. It is connected to the Fortuna Sittard men's team and shared Fortuna Sittard Stadion as a home stadium.

== History ==
On 25 January 2022, Fortuna announced it was beginning a women's football team. The club started playing in the Eredivisie in the 2022–23 season. It became the first top-level women's club in Limburg since VVV-Venlo folded in 2012. Owner Atilla Aytekin said before the club began play that the goal was to play in the Women's Champions League within three years. In its first season, the club finished third out of 11 teams. In the 2023–24 season, Fortuna finished fourth out of 12 teams, and forward Tessa Wullaert was the top goal scorer and Player of the Year in the league. However, prior to the 2024–25 season, the club announced it had not generated sufficient revenue from the women's team and cut its spending, with Wullaert, Alieke Tuin, and other players leaving for new clubs. Additionally, Glenda van Lieshout replaced inaugural manager Roger Reijners.

On 7 April 2025, the club announced its women's team would end after the current season, citing financial issues, including the withdrawal of its sponsor Principion. The club offered free admission to its final two home games, with 2.500 attending the final home game, a 3–0 loss to PSV.

== Competitive record ==
Season	Division	Position	W – D – L = Pts	GF – GA	Top scorer	KNVB Cup
2022–23	Eredivisie	3 / 11	11 – 3 – 6 = 36	49 – 27	Tessa Wullaert (20)	Quarterfinals
2023–24	Eredivisie	4 / 12	12 – 4 – 6 = 40	57 – 27	Tessa Wullaert (26)	Runner-up
2024–25	Eredivisie	8 / 12	5 – 5 – 12 = 20	20 – 42	Isa Dekker (5)	Quarterfinals

== Players ==
The squad given here is made up of the players registered to the club on the date of Fortuna Sittard's final league match (Fortuna Sittard 0–3 PSV, 3 May 2025).

Note: Flags indicate national team as defined under FIFA eligibility rules; some limited exceptions apply. Players may hold more than one non-FIFA nationality.

No.	Pos.	Nation	Player
1	GK	NED	Claire Dinkla
2	DF	NED	Moïsa van Koot
3	DF	NED	Nicole Stoop
5	DF	NED	Diana Hilhorst
6	MF	NED	Nienke Mulder
7	MF	FIN	Venla Lindfors
8	MF	NED	Amber van Heeswijk
9	FW	NED	Femke Prins
10	FW	NED	Lakeesha Eijken
11	FW	NED	Isa Dekker

No.	Pos.	Nation	Player
14	DF	NED	Sara Vijfhuizen
17	DF	NED	Femke Pietersma
19	MF	NED	Sanne Peereboom
21	FW	NED	Sanne Arons
26	DF	NED	Isabel Kopp

== Head coaches ==
- 2022–2024: (Netherlands) Roger Reijners
- 2024–2025: (Netherlands) Glenda van Lieshout
