= 2025–26 Eredivisie (women) =

Professional football season in the Netherlands

Vrouwen Eredivisie
- Season: 2025–26
- Dates: 6 September 2025 – 22 May 2026
- Champions: PSV; 1st title
- Relegated: Hera United; Excelsior; NAC
- Champions League: PSV; Ajax
- Europa Cup: Feyenoord
- Matches: 132
- Goals: 444 (3.36 per match)
- Top goalscorer: Jaimy Ravensbergen; Desiree van Lunteren (16 goals each)
- Biggest home win: Ajax 8–0 Utrecht; 7 December 2025
- Biggest away win: Excelsior 0–6 PSV; 12 March 2026
- Highest scoring: AZ 8–1 NAC; 23 November 2025

The 2025–26 Vrouwen Eredivisie, known as the 2025–26 Eurojackpot Vrouwen Eredivisie for sponsorship reasons, was the 16th season of the Vrouwen Eredivisie, the top division of women's football in the Netherlands. The season started on 6 September 2025 and ended on 22 May 2026.

Twente Enschede entered the season as the two-time defending champions. PSV Eindhoven were crowned champions, having won their first ever title in the club's history. It was also the first time a club other than Ajax Amsterdam or Twente had won the title since ADO Den Haag did so in 2011–12.

Hera United, Excelsior Rotterdam and NAC Breda were relegated to the Vrouwen Eerste Divisie.

== Format ==
The 12 teams in the league play in a double round-robin format: each team plays all other teams twice over 22 rounds, once at home and once away.

== Teams ==
Location of teams in the Women's Eredivisie in 2025–26

Twelve teams are competing in the 2025–26 season. New to the league this season are NAC Breda, which was promoted from the Vrouwen Eerste Divisie, and Hera United, which assumed the license from Telstar and many of its players.

Team	City / Town	Venue	Debut season
ADO Den Haag	Den Haag	Bingoal Stadion	2007–08
AFC Ajax	Amsterdam	Sportpark De Toekomst, Johan Cruyff Stadium	2015–16
AZ Alkmaar	Alkmaar	AFAS Trainingcomplex, AFAS Stadion	2023–24*
Excelsior	Rotterdam	Stadion Woudestein	2017–18
Feyenoord	Rotterdam	Varkenoord, Stadion Feijenoord	2021–22
SC Heerenveen	Heerenveen	Sportpark Skoatterwâld	2007–08
Hera United	Amsterdam	Sportpark Goed Genoeg	2025–26
NAC Breda	Breda	Sportpark Heksenwiel, Rat Verlegh Stadion	2025–26
PSV	Eindhoven	De Herdgang, Philips Stadion	2015–16
FC Twente	Enschede	Sportpark Schreurserve, De Grolsch Veste, Sportpark Het Diekman	2007–08
FC Utrecht	Utrecht	Sportcomplex Zoudenbalch, Stadion Galgenwaard	2023–24*
PEC Zwolle	Zwolle	MAC³PARK Stadion, Sportpark De Vegtlust	2010–11

*=return after previously playing in the Eredivisie

== Standings ==
Pos	Team	Pld	W	D	L	GF	GA	GD	Pts	Qualification
1	PSV (C)	22	17	3	2	56	15	+41	54	Qualification to Champions League second qualifying round
2	Ajax	22	15	5	2	55	18	+37	50	Qualification to Champions League second qualifying round
3	Feyenoord	22	14	5	3	45	17	+28	47	Qualification to Europa Cup first qualifying round
4	Twente	22	14	4	4	55	19	+36	46	
5	Utrecht	22	11	4	7	41	37	+4	37	
6	PEC Zwolle	22	11	1	10	35	32	+3	34	
7	Heerenveen	22	8	2	12	38	51	−13	26	
8	AZ	22	6	6	10	36	46	−10	24	
9	ADO Den Haag	22	6	4	12	24	45	−21	22	
10	Hera United (Note: Following the promotion of De Graafschap through the playoffs, Hera United were relegated) (R)	22	5	5	12	24	42	−18	20	Possible relegation to the Vrouwen Eerste Divisie
11	Excelsior (R)	22	2	2	18	18	51	−33	8	Relegation to the Vrouwen Eerste Divisie
12	NAC Breda (R)	22	2	1	19	17	71	−54	7	Relegation to the Vrouwen Eerste Divisie

Source: Vrouwen Eredivisie (in Dutch)
Rules for classification: Season in progress: 1) Most points won; 2) Less points lost; 3) Goal difference; 4) Goals scored; 5) Head-to-head points; 6) Head-to-head goal difference; 7) Head-to-head away goals scored; 8) Alphabetical order; End of season: 1) Points; 2) Goal difference; 3) Goals scored; 4) Head-to-head points; 5) Head-to-head goal difference; 6) Head-to-head away goals scored; 7) Play-off match, including extra time and a penalty shoot-out, if necessary.
(C) Champions; (R) Relegated

== Results ==
Home \ Away	ADO	AJA	AZ	EXC	FEY	HEE	HER	NAC	PEC	PSV	TWE	UTR
ADO Den Haag	—	0–3	0–1	3–2	1–1	2–2	0–1	4–2	3–0	0–2	0–5	0–5
Ajax	6–0	—	3–1	3–0	0–0	4–1	1–2	5–1	1–0	2–1	0–0	8–0
AZ	1–1	0–0	—	1–0	1–4	1–5	2–2	8–1	0–1	2–3	0–4	1–1
Excelsior	1–1	0–2	1–3	—	0–3	2–4	1–2	2–0	0–1	0–6	1–3	2–4
Feyenoord	2–0	0–1	3–3	1–0	—	6–1	3–0	3–0	1–0	2–2	2–0	3–0
Heerenveen	4–1	1–3	3–2	1–3	2–1	—	1–0	5–0	0–1	0–1	1–3	1–2
Hera United	1–3	0–5	1–2	1–1	0–1	2–1	—	1–1	2–3	1–2	0–0	1–2
NAC Breda	1–0	2–3	2–3	2–1	1–3	0–2	1–3	—	1–2	0–5	0–3	1–3
PEC Zwolle	2–1	7–1	2–0	4–1	0–1	1–1	3–2	4–0	—	0–2	1–4	1–2
PSV	2–0	1–1	2–1	1–0	1–1	6–0	4–0	4–1	3–0	—	1–3	3–0
Twente	0–1	1–1	4–1	3–0	3–2	5–1	3–0	6–0	3–2	1–2	—	1–1
Utrecht	1–3	0–2	3–3	2–0	1–2	5–1	2–2	1–0	3–0	1–2	2–0	—

Source: VrouwenEredivisie.nl
Legend: Blue = home team win; Yellow = draw; Red = away team win.

== Season statistics ==
=== Top scorers ===
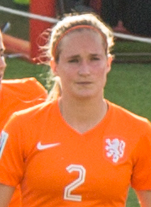
Twente's Jaimy Ravensbergen (not pictured) and AZ Alkmaar's Desiree van Lunteren (pictured) finished the season with the most goals, with 16 each.

Rank	Player	Club	Goals
1	(Netherlands) Jaimy Ravensbergen	Twente	16
1	(Netherlands) Desiree van Lunteren	AZ Alkmaar	16
3	(Netherlands) Lobke Loonen	Utrecht	14
4	(Netherlands) Nikita Tromp	Utrecht	11
4	(Switzerland) Riola Xhemaili	PSV Eindhoven	11
6	(Netherlands) Aymee Altena	Heerenveen	10
6	(Netherlands) Danique Tolhoek	Ajax	10
8	(Netherlands) Floortje Bol	ADO Den Haag	9
8	(Netherlands) Hanna Huizenga	PEC Zwolle	9
8	(Netherlands) Evi Maatman	Heerenveen	9

==== Hat-tricks ====
Player	For	Against	Result	Date
(Switzerland) Riola Xhemaili	PSV Eindhoven	NAC Breda	5–0 (A)	11 October 2025
(Netherlands) Desiree van Lunteren (Note: Scored four goals)	AZ Alkmaar	NAC Breda	8–1 (H)	24 November 2025
(Netherlands) Sophie van Vugt	PEC Zwolle	Ajax	7–1 (H)	23 November 2025
(Netherlands) Ranneke Derks	Ajax	Utrecht	8–0 (H)	7 December 2025
(Netherlands) Jill Roord	Twente	AZ Alkmaar	4–0 (A)	25 January 2026
(Netherlands) Jaimy Ravensbergen	Twente	Heerenveen	5–1 (H)	15 February 2026
(Netherlands) Lobke Loonen	Utrecht	ADO Den Haag	5–0 (A)	22 February 2026

== Broadcasting ==
All league matches were broadcast on ESPN in the Netherlands. In December 2025, N Sports announced the broadcast of one match per round in Brazil.
