= 2024–25 Eredivisie (women) =

Football league season in the Netherlands

Vrouwen Eredivisie
- Season: 2024–25
- Dates: 28 September 2024 – 17 May 2025
- Champions: Twente
- Champions League: Twente; PSV
- Europa Cup: Ajax
- Best Player: Renate Jansen
- Top goalscorer: Jaimy Ravensbergen (23 goals)
- Highest scoring: Twente 10 – 1 Excelsior (29 March 2025)
- Longest winning run: 9 - Twente
- Longest unbeaten run: 16 - Twente
- Longest winless run: 16 - Telstar
- Longest losing run: 7 - SC Heerenveen
- Highest attendance: 11,000 Feyenoord @ Ajax (8 February 2025)
- Lowest attendance: 50 Fortuna Sittard @ SC Heerenveen (2 November 2024)
- Total attendance: 105,790

The 2024–25 season was the 15th iteration, tenth since the restart in 2015, of the Eredivisie, the top national women's football league in the Netherlands. The season started on 28 September 2024 and concluded with the final matchday on 17 May 2025, with a season break between 22 December 2024 and 18 January 2025. Starting this season, the last placed team can be relegated if a club's first team wins the second-tier Vrouwen Eerste Divisie. In April 2025, Fortuna Sittard announced it would dissolve its women's team at the end of the season, with the club competing for three seasons in the league.

FC Twente won the championship, its tenth national league title. They clinched in the final match of the season, topping PSV on goal differential. The top two teams qualified for the Champions League, while defending champion Ajax fell to third place, landing a spot in the new Europa Cup.

After the season, the Eredivisie named Renate Jansen of PSV the Player of the Year and Veerle Buurman of PSV the Johan Cruyff Talent of the Year.

== Format ==
The 12 teams in the league played in a double round-robin format: each team played all other teams twice over 22 rounds, once at home and once away. The teams in the league were unchanged from the previous season, the first season with such stability since 2020–21, when there were only eight teams in the league.

All league matches were broadcast on ESPN. Some matches were also broadcast on national broadcaster NOS.

== Teams ==
Location of teams in the 2024–25 Vrouwen Eredivisie

Team	City / Town	Venue(s)	Capacity
ADO Den Haag	Den Haag	Bingoal Stadion	15,000
Ajax	Amsterdam	Sportpark De Toekomst	5,000
Ajax	Amsterdam	Johan Cruyff Arena	55,865
AZ	Alkmaar	AFAS Trainingcomplex	3,000
AZ	Alkmaar	AFAS Stadion	19,478
Excelsior	Rotterdam	Van Donge & De Roo Stadion	4,500
Feyenoord	Rotterdam	Sportcomplex Varkenoord	2,500
Fortuna Sittard	Sittard	Fortuna Sittard Stadion	12,500
Heerenveen	Heerenveen	Sportpark Skoatterwâld	3,000
PEC Zwolle	Zwolle	MAC³PARK Stadion	14,000
PSV	Eindhoven	Sportcomplex De Herdgang	2,500
Telstar	Velsen	711 Stadion	5,200
Twente	Enschede	De Grolsch Veste	30,205
Twente	Enschede	Sportpark Scheurserve	2,000
Utrecht	Utrecht	Stadion Galgenwaard	23,750
Utrecht	Utrecht	Sportcomplex Zoudenbalch	1,000

== Standings ==
Pos	Team	Pld	W	D	L	GF	GA	GD	Pts	Qualification
1	Twente (C)	22	18	3	1	69	19	+50	57	Qualification to Champions League second qualifying round
2	PSV	22	18	3	1	58	13	+45	57	Qualification to Champions League second qualifying round
3	Ajax	22	17	2	3	57	22	+35	53	Qualification to Europa Cup first qualifying round
4	Utrecht	22	12	4	6	39	22	+17	40	
5	Feyenoord	22	12	2	8	55	29	+26	38	
6	AZ	22	11	3	8	40	31	+9	36	
7	ADO Den Haag	22	5	6	11	25	43	−18	21	
8	Fortuna Sittard	22	5	5	12	20	42	−22	20	
9	Heerenveen	22	4	3	15	24	48	−24	15	
10	PEC Zwolle	22	3	5	14	15	44	−29	14	
11	Telstar	22	2	5	15	22	59	−37	11	
12	Excelsior	22	1	7	14	16	68	−52	10	Possible relegation to the Vrouwen Eerste Divisie

Source: VrouwenEredivisie.nl
Rules for classification: Season in progress: 1) Most points won; 2) Less points lost; 3) Goal difference; 4) Goals scored; 5) Head-to-head points; 6) Head-to-head goal difference; 7) Head-to-head away goals scored; 8) Alphabetical order; End of season: 1) Points; 2) Goal difference; 3) Goals scored; 4) Head-to-head points; 5) Head-to-head goal difference; 6) Head-to-head away goals scored; 7) Play-off match, including extra time and a penalty shoot-out, if necessary.
(C) Champions

== Results ==
Home \ Away	ADO	AJA	AZ	EXC	FEY	FOR	HEE	PEC	PSV	TEL	TWE	UTR
ADO Den Haag	—	0–2	1–4	4–0	1–3	2–0	0–1	1–0	1–1	2–2	0–4	0–2
Ajax	4–0	—	4–2	3–1	2–0	5–1	5–1	5–1	0–2	3–1	2–0	1–0
AZ	1–1	1–2	—	4–0	0–1	2–0	1–0	2–0	0–1	0–1	0–1	1–1
Excelsior	0–4	1–3	1–3	—	3–5	1–1	1–1	0–3	0–4	1–1	1–10	1–0
Feyenoord	3–0	0–0	1–1	7–0	—	1–2	1–0	2–0	1–4	8–1	1–4	0–3
Fortuna Sittard	0–0	0–1	1–3	0–0	0–6	—	1–1	1–0	0–3	5–0	1–3	0–4
Heerenveen	1–3	1–4	2–3	5–1	0–3	1–0	—	1–2	0–1	3–1	0–4	2–3
PEC Zwolle	1–1	0–4	1–2	2–2	0–6	0–1	2–2	—	0–1	0–0	0–3	0–4
PSV	2–0	3–1	4–1	4–0	3–2	3–0	5–1	4–0	—	4–0	2–2	1–0
Telstar	1–1	1–4	4–5	1–1	1–2	1–4	2–0	0–2	1–4	—	1–2	0–1
Twente	7–0	5–1	3–2	1–1	3–2	4–1	3–0	2–1	0–0	3–1	—	3–1
Utrecht	4–3	1–1	1–2	2–0	1–0	1–1	2–1	0–0	3–2	4–1	1–2	—

Source: VrouwenEredivisie.nl
Legend: Blue = home team win; Yellow = draw; Red = away team win.

== Statistics ==
=== Top scorers ===
As of 17 May 2025

Rank	Player	Club	Goals
1	(Netherlands) Jaimy Ravensbergen	Twente	23
2	(Netherlands) Danique Tolhoek	Ajax	19
3	(Belgium) Ella Van Kerkhoven	Feyenoord	13
4	(Netherlands) Tiny Hoekstra	Ajax	11
4	(Netherlands) Renate Jansen	PSV	11
4	(Netherlands) Desiree van Lunteren	AZ	11
7	(Netherlands) Esmee de Graaf	Feyenoord	10
7	(Switzerland) Riola Xhemaili	PSV	10
9	(Netherlands) Nikée van Dijk	Twente	9
9	(Netherlands) Evi Maatman	SC Heerenveen	9
