= Feyenoord (women) =

Dutch professional football club

- Full name: Feyenoord Rotterdam
- Nicknames: De club aan de Maas (The Club on the Meuse); De Stadionclub (The Stadium Club); De club van het volk (The Club of the People); De Trots van Zuid (The Pride of South)
- Founded: 31 March 2021; 5 years ago
- Ground: Sportcomplex Varkenoord
- Capacity: 2,500
- Chairman: Toon van Bodegom
- Head coach: Jessica Torny
- League: Vrouwen Eredivisie
- 2025–26: 3rd
- Website: feyenoord.nl
Home colours	Away colours	Third colours

Feyenoord Vrouwen is a Dutch football club from Rotterdam representing Feyenoord in the Vrouwen Eredivisie, the top women's league in the Netherlands. The team was founded in March 2021 with the team entering the league from the 2021–22 season.

== Current squad ==
As of 27 March 2026

Note: Flags indicate national team as defined under FIFA eligibility rules; some limited exceptions apply. Players may hold more than one non-FIFA nationality.

No.	Pos.	Nation	Player
1	GK	NED	Jacintha Weimar
3	DF	JPN	Akari Takeshige
4	DF	NED	Amber Verspaget
5	DF	CUW	Celainy Obispo
6	DF	NED	Justine Brandau
7	MF	JPN	Kokona Iwasaki
9	FW	NED	Sanne Koopman
10	MF	NED	Kirsten van de Westeringh
11	FW	USA	Tori DellaPeruta (on loan from Fiorentina)
14	MF	NED	Esmee de Graaf
16	GK	NED	Roos van Eijk
17	FW	NED	Noëlle van der Sluijs
18	DF	NED	Lucy Heij

No.	Pos.	Nation	Player
19	FW	NED	Fleur Stoit
20	GK	NED	Claire Dinkla
21	MF	NED	Tess van Bentem
22	MF	NED	Eva van Deursen
24	DF	NED	Bridget Jno Baptiste
25	MF	NED	Romeé van de Lavoir
26	DF	NED	Sanne de Paus
27	MF	USA	Talia DellaPeruta
28	FW	NED	Zera Hulswit
29	FW	NED	Dechamaily Lont
33	FW	BEL	Ella van Kerkhoven
42	FW	BEL	Esther Buabadi
—	DF	SUI	Mia Schmid

== Backroom staff ==
Position	
Head coach	(Netherlands) Jessica Torny
Assistant coaches	(Netherlands) Ashley van den Dungen (Netherlands) Patty Damsma
Goalkeeping coach	(Netherlands) John Bos
Team manager	(Netherlands) Jonara Bernardina
Physiotherapist	(Netherlands) Marjolein Kusters

== Record and statistics ==
=== Seasons ===
Season	Division	Position	W – D – L = Pts	GF – GA	Top scorer	KNVB Cup
2021–22	Eredivisie	5 / 9	10 – 5 – 9 = 35	32 – 40	Bennink / van de Lavoir (6)	Quarter-finals
2022–23	Eredivisie	7 / 11	6 – 6 – 8 = 24	18 – 24	Bennink (5)	Final 16
2023–24	Eredivisie	8 / 12	7 – 3 – 12 = 24	26 – 38	De Graaf (6)	Semi-Finals
2024–25	Eredivisie	5 / 12	12 – 2 – 8 = 38	55 – 29	Van Kerkhoven (13)	

=== Records ===
- Biggest win: 8–1 (v Telstar – Eredivisie, 7 December 2024)
- Biggest defeat: 0–6 (v Twente – Eredivisie, 13 March 2022)
- Most goals scored in a single season: 13 by Ella Van Kerkhoven (2024–25)
