= Jaimy Ravensbergen =

Dutch footballer (born 2001)

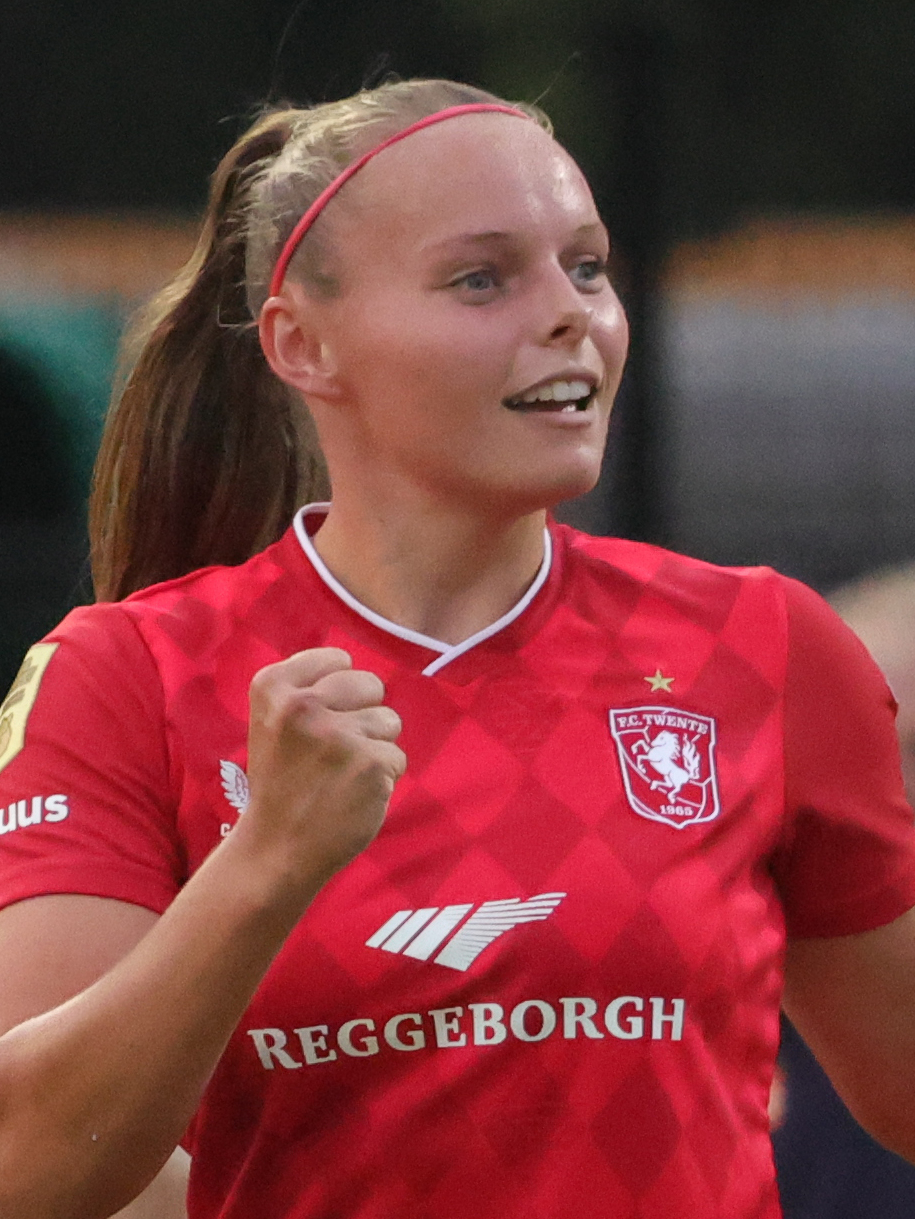
- Ravensbergen with Twente in 2025

Personal information
- Full name: Jaimy Ravensbergen
- Date of birth: 19 March 2001 (age 25)
- Place of birth: Leiden, Netherlands
- Position: Forward

Team information
- Current team: Twente
- Number: 9

Youth career
- RKSV DoCos
- ADO Den Haag

Senior career*
Years	Team	Apps	(Gls)
2019–2023	ADO Den Haag	66	(29)
2023–	Twente	54	(49)

International career
2017	Netherlands U16	6	(0)
2017–2018	Netherlands U17	3	(3)
2021–2023	Netherlands U23	10	(0)
- * Club domestic league appearances and goals as of 22 November 2026

Jaimy Ravensbergen (born 19 March 2001) is a Dutch professional footballer who plays as a forward for Vrouwen Eredivisie club Twente.

== Club career ==
Ravensbergen is a former youth academy player of DoCos and ADO Den Haag. She made her senior career debut for ADO Den Haag on 19 April 2019 in a 3–3 draw against PEC Zwolle.

On 21 February 2023, Twente announced the signing of Ravensbergen on a two-year deal until June 2025. On 11 May 2024, she scored a brace in a 2–0 win against Telstar to help her club win the league title.

Ravensbergen scored 23 goals during the 2024–25 Eredivisie season, including a hat-trick in the final matchday to help Twente win the league title. During the season, Ravensbergen signed a contract extension, keeping her with Twente until June 2027.

== International career ==
Ravensbergen has represented the Netherlands at various youth levels, having played for the under-16, under-17, and under-23 teams.

== Honours ==
Twente

- Vrouwen Eredivisie: 2023–24, 2024–25
- KNVB Women's Cup: 2024–25, 2025–26
- Eredivisie Cup: 2023–24
- Dutch Women's Super Cup: 2024, 2025

Individual

- Vrouwen Eredivisie top goalscorer: 2024–25, 2025–26
- KNVB Women's Cup top goalscorer: 2025–26
- Eredivisie Cup top goalscorer: 2024–25
