= Sportcomplex Varkenoord =

Sports facility in Rotterdam, Netherlands

- Varkenoord
- Interactive map of Sportcomplex Varkenoord
- Address: Olympiaweg 74-76; 3078 HT Rotterdam; Netherlands
- Location: Rotterdam
- Coordinates: 51.891306°N 4.525°E
- Owner: Feyenoord; Feyenoord Academy; SC Feyenoord
- Capacity: 2,500
- Type: Sports facility

Construction
- Opened: 1949

Sportcomplex Varkenoord is a sports facility located in Rotterdam, Netherlands. Varkenoord is the home base of Feyenoord Academy, the women's team and the amateur football club SC Feyenoord. The fields are also being used as training ground by Feyenoord's first team squad.
