= Stadion Woudestein =

Dutch Football Stadium

Coordinates: 51°55′01″N 4°31′14″E

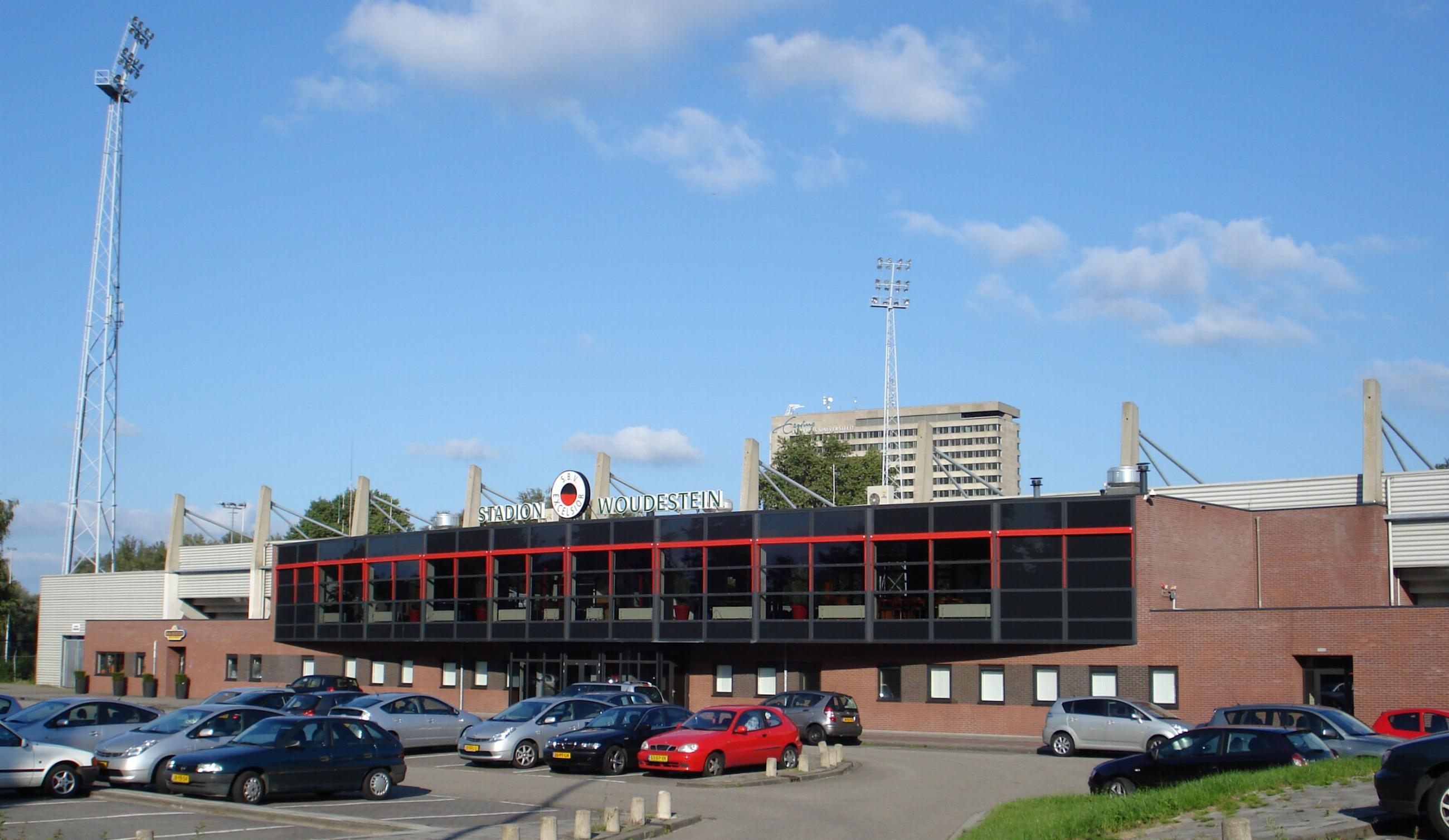
- Interactive map of Stadion Woudestein
- Full name: Stadion Woudestein; 2004-2017 ; 2025-...
- Former names: Stadion Stad Rotterdam Verzekeringen; 2000–2004; Van Donge & De Roo Stadion 2017-2025
- Location: Rotterdam, Netherlands
- Capacity: 4,500
- Surface: artificial turf

Construction
- Opened: 23 July 1902
- Renovated: 1939; 1958; 1973; 1997–2000; 2016
- Architect: Van Wijnen

Tenant
- Excelsior

The Stadion Woudestein (Dutch pronunciation: [ˌstaːdijɔɱ ˈʋʌudəstɛin]; formerly known as the Van Donge & De Roo Stadion for sponsorship reasons between 2017 and 2025), is a multi-use stadium in Rotterdam, Netherlands.

It is currently used mainly for football matches and is the home stadium of the Excelsior men's and women's teams.

The stadium is able to hold 4,500 people and was built in 1902. It remains one of the smallest stadiums in the Netherlands that is used by a professional football club. The stadium has a stand named after Robin van Persie, who played for the Excelsior youth academy from 1997 to 1999.
