= Excelsior Rotterdam (women) =

- Founded: 2017
- Ground: Van Donge & De Roo Stadion
- Capacity: 4,500
- Head coach: Mathijs Kreugel
- League: Eredivisie
- 2025–26: 11th
- Website: https://excelsiorrotterdam.nl/teams/excelsiorvrouwen/

Excelsior Rotterdam is a Dutch women's football team from Rotterdam which competes in the Vrouwen Eredivisie, the top league in the Netherlands.

Established in 2017 as a result of a three seasons partnership between professional club Excelsior Rotterdam and amateur club BVV Barendrecht to create a women's team from the Rotterdam area. That relationship lasted three years, after which Excelsior solely operated the club.

The team host its matches at Van Donge & De Roo Stadion. It previously used Barendrecht's facilities for matches and training.

The club has finished in last place in the Eredivisie in all but two of its seasons, eking out second-to-last place finishes in 2018–19 and 2020–21. It has twice reached the semifinals of the KNVB Women's Cup.

== Seasons ==
9	8	8	7	9	11	12
18	19	20	21	22	23	24
Vrouwen Eredivisie

Season	Division	Position	W – D – L = Pts	GF – GA	Top scorer	KNVB Cup
2017–18	Eredivisie	9 / 9	1 – 2 – 22 = 5	21 – 77	Henriquez (6)	Round of 16
2018–19	Eredivisie	8 / 9	5 – 4 – 16 = 19	27 – 58	Henriquez (11)	Quarterfinals
2019–20	Eredivisie	8 / 8 ^{a}	0 – 3 – 9 = 3	10 – 40	Cobussen (3)	^{a}
2020–21	Eredivisie	7 / 8	2 – 6 – 9 = 12	15 – 48	Kersten, Nieuwland (3)	Quarterfinals
2021–22	Eredivisie	9 / 9	2 – 5 – 17 = 11	28 – 83	Ellouzi (7)	Semifinals
2022–23	Eredivisie	11 / 11	2 – 2 – 16 = 8	14 – 57	Three tied (2)	Quarterfinals
2023–24	Eredivisie	12 / 12	2 – 5 – 15 = 11	20 – 53	Ellouzi (6)	Semifinals

a = season abandoned due to COVID-19

== Current squad ==
As of May 2023

Note: Flags indicate national team as defined under FIFA eligibility rules; some limited exceptions apply. Players may hold more than one non-FIFA nationality.

No.	Pos.	Nation	Player
1	GK	NED	Isa Pothof
2	DF	NED	Lieke de With
3	DF	NED	Rachel Kleine
4	DF	NED	Yara Helderman
5	DF	NED	Yentl van Goch
6	MF	NED	Lynn Groenewegen
7	FW	NED	Dana Breewel
8	MF	NED	Kim Hendriks
9	FW	TUN	Sabrine Ellouzi
10	MF	NED	Kathelyn Hendriks
11	FW	NED	Wendy Balfoort
12	DF	NED	Jikke de Raaf

No.	Pos.	Nation	Player
14	MF	NED	Lieve van Vlier
15	DF	NED	Fleur Mol
16	FW	ARU	Bonny Lammers
19	FW	NED	Veerle van Spijk
20	GK	NED	Nikki de Haan
21	GK	NED	Floor Oussoren
22	FW	NED	Chelsea Homan
23	DF	NED	Robine de Ridder
24	MF	NED	Stephanie Aurélio

== Head coaches ==
- (Netherlands) Sander Luiten (2017–2018)
- (Netherlands) Richard Mank (2018–2024)
- (Netherlands) Mathijs Kreugel (2024–present)

== Broadcasting ==
As of the 2024–25 season, league matches are broadcast domestically on ESPN. Public service broadcaster NOS occasionally broadcasts some games live and provides game highlights during the Studio Sport programme.
