= PSV Eindhoven (women) =

Dutch women's football team

Coordinates: 51°24′42″N 5°28′46″E

PSV Vrouwen
- Full name: Philips Sport Vereniging Vrouwen
- Nicknames: Boerinnen (Peasants/Farmers); Lampen (Lightbulbs); Rood-witten (Red and whites)
- Short name: PSV Vrouwen
- Founded: 4 June 2012; 14 years ago, as PSV/FC Eindhoven
- Ground: De Herdgang
- Capacity: 2,500
- General manager: Marcel Brands
- Chairman: Sandra Doreleijers
- Head coach: Roeland ten Berge
- League: Vrouwen Eredivisie
- 2025–26: Eredivisie, 1st of 12 (champions)
- Website: Official website
Home colours	Away colours

Philips Sport Vereniging Vrouwen, commonly known as PSV and internationally known as PSV Eindhoven, is a Dutch women's football team representing PSV Eindhoven in the Vrouwen Eredivisie, the top league in the Netherlands.

A founding member of the BeNe League in 2012, the team was known as PSV/FC Eindhoven and supported jointly by FC Eindhoven and PSV. Following the BeNe League's dissolution after the 2014–15 season, the team joined the Eredivisie as the women's team of PSV.

== History ==
PSV won its first trophy in 2021, defeating ADO Den Haag to win the KNVB Women's Cup. The team was in first place when the 2019–20 season was suspended early due to the COVID-19 pandemic; the KNVB, the national governing body for football, did not name a champion. The following two seasons, PSV qualified to the UEFA Champions League.

PSV won the 2025–26 Eredivisie title on 8 May 2026, beating ADO Den Haag 2–0 to secure the championship with one game remaining, earning their first league title after narrowly missing out on goal difference the previous season.

== Domestic seasons ==
Former team logo (2012–15)

3	7	5	3	3	5	3	1	2	3	4	3	2	1
13	14	15	16	17	18	19	20	21	22	23	24	25	26
BeNe League Eredivisie Vrouwen

Season	League	Pos	G	W	D	L	GF	GA	P	Top scorer	KNVB Cup
2012/13	BeNe; League	3	28	13	10	5	46	32	49	Van de Donk (14)	Round of 16
2013/14	BeNe; League	7	26	12	3	11	48	42	39	Van de Donk (12)	Finalist
2014/15	BeNe; League	5	24	11	4	9	46	37	37	Van de Donk (10)	Quarterfinals
2015/16	Eredivisie	3	24	14	3	7	57	35	45	Lewerissa (11)	Semifinalist
2016/17	Eredivisie	3	27	13	3	11	60	34	42	Lewerissa (13)	Finalist
2017/18	Eredivisie	5	24	7	6	11	48	45	27	Lewerissa (10)	Finalist
2018/19	Eredivisie	3	24	16	3	5	70	22	51	Snoeijs (16)	Quarterfinals
2019/20	Eredivisie	1 (Note: at the moment of cancellation. The season was abandoned due to Covid.)	12	10	2	0	42	8	32	Smits (16)	cancelled
2020/21	Eredivisie	2	20	14	1	5	49	23	43	Smits (23)	Winner
2021/22	Eredivisie	3	24	13	4	7	35	29	43	Van Lunteren (10)	Finalist
2022/23	Eredivisie	4	20	11	2	7	36	23	35	Brugts (8)	Finalist
2023/24	Eredivisie	3	22	12	5	5	52	24	41	Smits (17)	Round of 16
2024/25	Eredivisie	2	22	18	3	1	58	13	57	Jansen (11)	Finalist
2025/26	Eredivisie	1	22	17	3	2	56	15	54	Xhemaili (11)	Finalist

== Champions League ==
PSV score is always first

Season	Competition	Round		Opposition	Home	Away	Aggregate
2020-21	UEFA Women's Champions League	Round of 32		(Spain) Barcelona	1–4	1–4	2–8
2021–22	UEFA Women's Champions League	Q1	semi-final	(Russia) Lokomotiv Moscow	3–1		—N/a
2021–22	UEFA Women's Champions League	Q1	final	(England) Arsenal	1–3		—N/a
2025-26	UEFA Women's Champions League	Q2	semi-final	(England) Manchester United	0–4		—N/a
2025-26	UEFA Women's Champions League	Q2	third place	(Ukraine) Metalist 1925 Kharkiv	2–0		—N/a
2025-26	UEFA Women's Europa Cup	Q1		(Norway) Rosenborg	4–0	0–3	4–3
2025-26	UEFA Women's Europa Cup	Q2		(Belarus) FC Minsk	2–0		—N/a
2025-26	UEFA Women's Europa Cup	Round of 16		(Germany) Eintracht Frankfurt	1–2	1–3	2–5
2026-27	UEFA Women's Champions League	Q2	semi-final	(Bosnia and Herzegovina) SFK 2000	3–2		—N/a
2026-27	UEFA Women's Champions League	Q2	final	(Finland) HJK	3–1		—N/a
2026-27	UEFA Women's Champions League	Q3		(Denmark) HB Køge	1–1	1–2	2–3
2026-27	UEFA Women's Europa Cup	Q2		(Denmark) Fortuna Hjørring			

== Honours ==
National

- Vrouwen Eredivisie
  - Winners (1): 2025–26
- KNVB Women's Cup
  - Winners (1): 2020–21
- Eredivisie Cup
  - Winners (2): 2024–25, 2025–26
- Dutch Women's Super Cup
  - Winners (1): 2026

== Current squad ==
As of 7 July 2026.

Note: Flags indicate national team as defined under FIFA eligibility rules; some limited exceptions apply. Players may hold more than one non-FIFA nationality.

No.	Pos.	Nation	Player
1	GK	BEL	Nicky Evrard
2	DF	DEN	Sara Thrige
3	DF	NED	Gwyneth Hendriks
5	DF	NED	Melanie Bross
6	FW	NED	Sisca Folkertsma
8	DF	NED	Siri Worm
9	FW	NED	Joëlle Smits
10	MF	NED	Chimera Ripa
11	FW	NED	Renate Jansen
14	MF	NED	Laura Strik
16	GK	NED	Lisan Alkemade

No.	Pos.	Nation	Player
17	FW	BEL	Lore Jacobs
18	FW	NED	Shanique Dessing
19	FW	NED	Fleur Stoit
21	MF	NED	Robine Lacroix
23	DF	NED	Myrthe Kemper-Moorrees
24		NED	Emmeke Henschen
25		NED	Emma Frijns
26	GK	NED	Moon Pondes
—	MF	BEL	Janice Cayman
27	MF	SUI	Riola Xhemaili (on loan from VfL Wolfsburg)

=== Out on loan ===
Note: Flags indicate national team as defined under FIFA eligibility rules; some limited exceptions apply. Players may hold more than one non-FIFA nationality.

No.	Pos.	Nation	Player

== Head coaches ==
- Hesterine de Reus (2012)
- Nebojša Vučković (2013–18)
- Sander Luiten (2018–20)
- Rick de Rooij (2020–2023)
- Roeland ten Berge (2023–present)

== Broadcasting ==
As of the 2024–25 season, league matches are broadcast on ESPN in the Netherlands. Public service broadcaster NOS occasionally broadcasts some Sunday games live and provides game highlights during the Studio Sport programme.
