= Vrouwen Eredivisie =

Football league in the Netherlands

- Organising body: KNVB
- Founded: 20 March 2007; 2 April 2015 (re-established)
- First season: 2007–08
- Country: Netherlands
- Confederation: UEFA
- Number of clubs: 10
- Level on pyramid: 1
- Relegation to: Vrouwen Eerste Divisie
- Domestic cups: KNVB Women's Cup; Dutch Women's Super Cup
- League cup: Eredivisie Cup
- International cup(s): UEFA Women's Champions League; UEFA Women's Europa Cup
- Current champions: PSV Eindhoven (2025–26)
- Most championships: FC Twente (10 titles)
- Broadcasters: ESPN, NOS
- Website: Vrouwen Eredivisie
- Current: 2026–27 Vrouwen Eredivisie

The Vrouwen Eredivisie (pronounced [ˈvrɑu̯ən ˈeːrədiˌvizi]; Dutch for "Women's Honour Division"; known as the Eredivisie Vrouwen before 2020), also known as the Eurojackpot Vrouwen Eredivisie for sponsorship reasons, is the highest women's football league in the Netherlands. Organised by the Royal Dutch Football Association (KNVB), it was established in 2007 as a professional league and played for five seasons until 2012, when the Netherlands and Belgium merged their leagues into a single combined league, the BeNe League. After three seasons, the BeNe League folded, and the Eredivisie restarted in the 2015–16 season. The top two Eredivisie teams each year qualify for the UEFA Women's Champions League. The third place team qualifies for the UEFA Women's Europa Cup. FC Twente has won 10 league championships, while Ajax and AZ have won three.

== History ==
=== Background ===
Since the 1970s, amateur women's football competitions have been played in the Netherlands, with the Hoofdklasse being the highest level. During the 1990s, the popularity of women's football rose, with the sport becoming an Olympic event in 1996 and selling hundreds of thousands of tickets for the 1999 FIFA Women's World Cup. With the Netherlands women's national team unable to qualify to major tournaments such as the Women's World Cup, UEFA Women's Championship, or the Olympics, and the most talented female players leaving for other countries with professional leagues, the Royal Dutch Football Association (KNVB) felt compelled to act.

In January 2007, the KNVB presented plans for the Eredivisie Vrouwen, a professional women's league. Many clubs were interested, and on 20 March 2007, the KNVB formally announced the league for three seasons, with the first scheduled for 2007–08 with six clubs: ADO Den Haag, AZ, sc Heerenveen, FC Twente, FC Utrecht, and Willem II.

According to the league's business plan, initially the national team players were divided amongst the six clubs. In addition to organizing the league, the KNVB provided a start-up subsidy, contribution to the costs, and technical assistance to the professional clubs, which in return would provide technical and medical staff, transport, training, and other facilities to their players. The clubs needed an affiliate agreement with an amateur club that would use players coming back from injury, reserve players, or young talented players from the professional club. The league planned to expand from six clubs to 10–12 clubs in five to eight years.

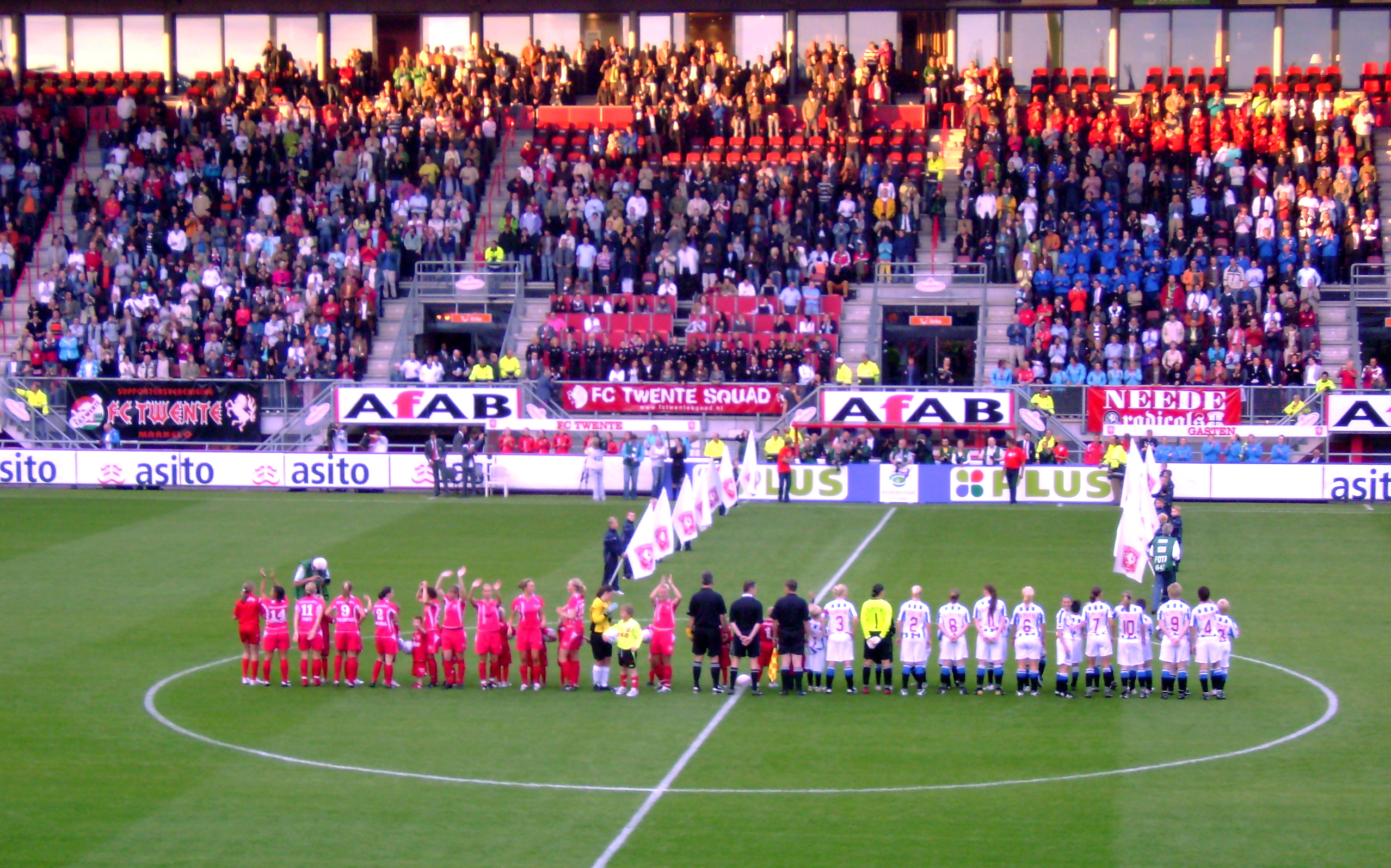
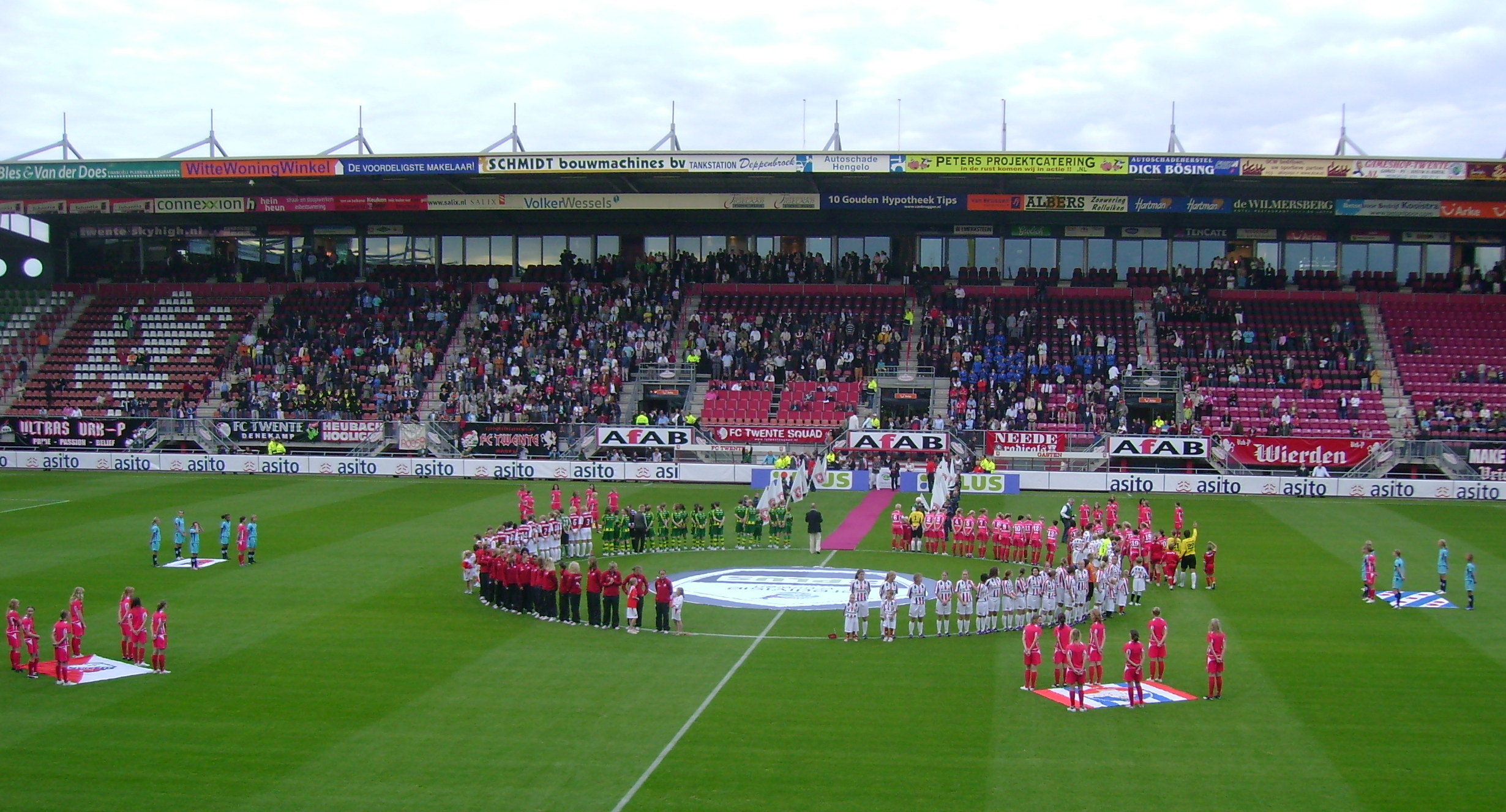
Opening ceremony before the first Eredivisie Vrouwen game between Twente vs. Heerenveen on 29 August 2007

=== Foundation and expansion (2007–2010) ===
On 29 August 2007, the opening ceremony for the launch of the Eredivisie Vrouwen took place at the Arke Stadion in Enschede, with the presentation of the six participating teams, ahead of the league's inaugural match played by FC Twente and sc Heerenveen in front of 5.500 spectators. Heerenveen won the match 3–2. Marieke van Ottele scored the first-ever Eredivisie goal for Twente, 73 seconds into the match. At the end of the season, AZ were crowned the first league champions and Karin Stevens the top scorer with 20 goals.

On 15 April 2008, Roda JC was confirmed as the seventh team for the 2008–09 season. AZ won the championship for a second consecutive year, and Sylvia Smit was the top scorer with 14 goals. On 5 May 2009, financial problems forced Roda JC to announce its withdraw from the Eredivisie. The six founding teams participated in the 2009–10 season, which AZ won for the third consecutive season. Smit, for the second consecutive season, and Chantal de Ridder were top scorers with 11 goals each.

Two new teams, VVV-Venlo and FC Zwolle, joined the league on 10 March 2010, increasing the number of teams to eight for the 2010–11 season. Twente won its first league title, breaking AZ's three-year championship streak. Chantal de Ridder was the top scorer for a second consecutive season with 19 goals.

=== League changes and BeNe League (2011–2012) ===
On 22 February 2011, during the second half of the 2010–11 season, a meeting between the league, the KNVB, and clubs was held to discuss improving the league. A statement from the KNVB announced that for the next season, matchdays would move from Thursdays to Fridays, relationship changes between clubs and their affiliated amateur clubs, guideline principles amongst other topics discussed and the financial conditions were to be discussed on a further meeting, as the KNVB was trying to keep the league with eight teams next season. That day, following the meeting, three-time league champions AZ announced it would withdraw from the league once the season was completed. The next day, Willem II announced it was also withdrawing from the league's next season. Financial issues were responsible for both clubs' decision. PSV, working to build a women's team, confirmed on 3 March it would not participate in the following season. On 8 March, FC Utrecht also announced its withdraw from the next season, also due to financial reasons, but on 6 April 2011 retreated its withdrawal and confirmed it had secured finances for one more season. On 14 April, sc Heerenveen announced its withdraw due to financial issues. Two weeks later, on 26 April, as the club continued working to find sponsors to remain in the league, RBC Roosendaal presented a possibility of entering a team if its male team remained in Eerste Divisie. The KNVB extension of the clubs' registration deadline allowed sc Heerenveen to secure the funds needed to play another season, and on 28 April, the club confirmed its participation. On 27 May, Telstar was confirmed as the seventh team for the following season.

ADO Den Haag won the 2011–12 season, the club's first league title, and Priscilla de Vos of Telstar was the top scorer with 16 goals. It was the last Eredivisie season for several years: on 30 August 2011, the KNVB and its Belgian counterpart, the KBVB, presented a proposal to merge their women's professional leagues into a combined BeNe League. On 10 December, the KBVB agreed to go ahead with the BeNe League, and two days later, the KNVB decided to stop investing in the Eredivisie for the next three years. On 13 February 2012, the KNVB announced it was also going ahead with the BeNe League, and on 23 March, it received approval from UEFA. The new league had its inaugural season in 2012–13.

=== Restart and growth (2015–2024) ===
After three seasons, the BeNe League folded at the end of the 2014–15 season. On 2 April 2015, the KNVB confirmed the restart of the Eredivisie Vrouwen with the participation of the seven Dutch clubs that played in the final BeNe League season. Ajax and PSV made their debut in the re-formed Eredivisie, as both clubs established women's teams in 2012. They joined ADO Den Haag, SC Heerenveen, Telstar, FC Twente, and PEC Zwolle, which all returned to the Eredivisie after the 2011–12 season.

FC Twente won its second Eredivisie title in 2015–16, and Jill Roord of Twente was the top scorer with 20 goals. The 2016–17 season was played by eight clubs after Achilles '29 was confirmed as newcomers on 16 June 2016. Ajax won their first title, and Telstar's Katja Snoeijs was the top scorer with 21 goals.

On 1 March 2017, Telstar announced it was being replaced by a new club, VV Alkmaar. VV officially formed on 21 April. On 10 April, Excelsior Barendrecht became the ninth team in the Eredivisie. On 19 April 2019, Achilles '29 announced it was ending its participation in the Eredivisie. The club had poor finances and poor performances, finishing above last place once in its three years in the league. One week later, on 26 April, sc Heerenveen also announced it would cease competing. However, on 19 June, the club reversed course and announced it would continue its women's team.

Due to COVID-19, the 2019–20 season ended early, with the final match played on 18 February 2020. No champion was named, with PSV having the most points when the season was halted. Joëlle Smits of PSV was the leading scorer with 16 goals. In August 2020, the league was re-branded as Vrouwen Eredivisie and given a new logo with a stylized lioness.

On 31 March 2021, Feyenoord announced that the club would join the Eredivisie in the 2021–22 season. In January 2022, Dutch media reported that Fortuna Sittard and Telstar would compete in the Eredivisie the following season, taking the league to 11 clubs. Telstar returned to the league after five years, while Fortuna was a newcomer. Both sought to capitalise on the growing domestic popularity of the women's game. FC Utrecht rejoined the Eredivisie in the 2023–24 season, bringing the league to 12 clubs. That season, AZ Alkmaar replaced VV Alkmaar, rejoining the league for the first time since 2011.

=== New teams and contraction (2025–present) ===
In April 2025, Fortuna Sittard announced it would dissolve its women's team at the end of the 2024–25 season. On 16 June, NAC Breda announced that its women's team, which began competing in a lower division the previous September, would take Fortuna's place in the league. The next day, the league announced a re-structuring, with the Eredivisie contracting to 10 teams beginning in the 2026–27 season and a formal promotion and relegation system, with the second-tier Vrouwen Eerste Divisie splitting into an Eerste Divisie and Tweede Divisie, creating a pyramid structure. In September, the KNVB agreed to transfer Telstar's license to Hera United, a new, women's-only club in Amsterdam. Management of Hera and ADO both criticized the KNVB's planned contraction of the Eredivisie.

The bottom three teams in the 2025–26 season, Hera, Excelsior, and NAC, were relegated. On 22 May 2026, the final matchday of the season, De Graafschap won an Eerste Divisie playoff against Ajax's reserve team to confirm their promotion to the 10-team Eredivisie. PSV won its first league title and Feyenoord finished third, knocking Twente out of European competition. PSV also won its first Super Cup in July.

== Format ==
The Eredivisie plays in a double round-robin format, with all 12 teams playing each other once at home and once on the road.

Due to the varying number of teams in the league, its schedule has had several different formats. From its inception until 2009–10, the Eredivisie played in a quadruple round-robin format, with teams playing each other four times a season. The following two season, 2010–11 and 2011–12, the schedule was changed to a triple round-robin, with teams playing each other three times, once at home, once away, and the host of the third match determined by lottery before the season. When the Eredivisie returned in 2015–16, so did the original quadruple round-robin schedule.

From 2016 to 2020, the season was split in two parts, a regular season, where all clubs play a triple round-robin format, and a playoff, where the top four teams, based on points, form a champions group and the remaining teams form a placement group. Each group then played a double round-robin schedule. Points won in the regular season were halved and added to the points of the playoff stage rounds to determine final rankings. In the 2021–22 season, the league returned to a triple round-robin system, eliminating the playoff groups. In the 2022–23 season, the league adopted its current double round-robin format.

There has not been relegation from the Eredivisie, but the league announced in March 2024 that there would be a promotion and relegation system beginning during the 2024–25 season. Promotion and relegation had been planned since 2008. Teams may be promoted from the lower Vrouwen Eerste Divisie. The last placed Eredivisie team can be relegated if a club's first team wins the Eerste Divisie. That season, there was no relegation due to Fortuna Sittard's dissolution, but the league announced that three clubs would be demoted in the 2025–26 season with one team promoted to form a ten-team league.

Other club tournaments run during or adjacent to the Eredivise season. Prior to the season, the previous season's league champion and cup champion play in the Super Cup. During the season, Eredivisie club and lower-level women's clubs compete in the KNVB Women's Cup. Since 2019, the top champion and the leaders during each of the first three quarters of the season compete in the Eredivisie Cup, held after the regular season.

== Teams ==
=== Current season ===
Location of teams in the Women's Eredivisie in 2025–26

Twelve teams competed in the 2025–26 season.

Team	City / Town	Venue	Debut season
ADO Den Haag	Den Haag	Bingoal Stadion	2007–08
AFC Ajax	Amsterdam	Sportpark De Toekomst, Johan Cruyff Stadium	2015–16
AZ Alkmaar	Alkmaar	AFAS Trainingcomplex, AFAS Stadion	2023–24*
Excelsior	Rotterdam	Stadion Woudestein	2017–18
Feyenoord	Rotterdam	Varkenoord, Stadion Feijenoord	2021–22
SC Heerenveen	Heerenveen	Sportpark Skoatterwâld	2007–08
Hera United	Amsterdam	Sportpark Goed Genoeg	2025–26
NAC Breda	Breda	Sportpark Heksenwiel, Rat Verlegh Stadion	2025–26
PSV	Eindhoven	De Herdgang, Philips Stadion	2015–16
FC Twente	Enschede	Sportpark Schreurserve, De Grolsch Veste, Sportpark Het Diekman	2007–08
FC Utrecht	Utrecht	Sportcomplex Zoudenbalch, Stadion Galgenwaard	2023–24*
PEC Zwolle	Zwolle	MAC³PARK Stadion, Sportpark De Vegtlust	2010–11

*=return after previously playing in the Eredivisie

=== Overview ===
Clubs performance by season:

Team	City / Town	Seasons (number of clubs)																Total
Team	City / Town	2007 –08 (6)	2008 –09 (7)	2009 –10 (6)	2010 –11 (8)	2011 –12 (7)	2015 –16 (7)	2016 –17 (8)	2017 –18 (9)	2018 –19 (9)	2019 –20 (8) (Note: Season abandoned due to COVID-19 pandemic.)	2020 –21 (8)	2021 –22 (9)	2022 –23 (11)	2023 –24 (12)	2024 –25 (12)	2025 –26 (12)	Total
Achilles '29	Groesbeek	DNP						7	8	9	DNP							3
ADO Den Haag	The Hague	4	2	2	2	1	4	4	6	4	5	4	4	5	5	7	9	16
Ajax	Amsterdam	DNP					2	1	1	2	2	3	2	1	2	3	2	10
AZ Alkmaar	Alkmaar	1	1	1	3	DNP									9	6	8	7
Excelsior (Note: previously Excelsior Barendrecht)	Rotterdam	DNP							9	8	8	7	9	11	12	12	11	9
Feyenoord	Rotterdam	DNP											5	7	8	5	3	5
Fortuna Sittard	Sittard	DNP												3	4	8	DNP	3
SC Heerenveen	Heerenveen	6	6	6	4	7	6	6	3	6	4	5	7	8	10	9	7	16
Hera United	Amsterdam	DNP															10	1
NAC Breda	Breda	DNP															12	1
PSV Eindhoven	Eindhoven	DNP					3	3	5	3	1	2	3	4	3	2	1	11
Roda JC	Kerkrade	DNP	7	DNP														1
Telstar	Velsen	DNP				3	5	5	DNP					10	11	11	DNP	6
FC Twente	Enschede	5	5	4	1	2	1	2	2	1	3	1	1	2	1	1	4	16
FC Utrecht	Utrecht	3	4	5	5	4	DNP								7	4	5	8
VV Alkmaar	Alkmaar	DNP							7	7	6	8	8	9	DNP			6
VVV-Venlo	Venlo	DNP			6	5	DNP											2
Willem II	Tilburg	2	3	3	7	DNP												4
PEC Zwolle	Zwolle	DNP			8	6	7	8	4	5	7	6	6	6	6	10	6	13

Note: Eredivisie did not take place between 2012 and 2015 (see BeNe League).

== Champions ==
Year	Winners	Runners-up	Third	No. teams	Ref.
2007–08	AZ	Willem II	FC Utrecht	6	
2008–09	AZ	ADO Den Haag	Willem II	7	
2009–10	AZ	ADO Den Haag	Willem II	6	
2010–11	FC Twente	ADO Den Haag	AZ	8	
2011–12	ADO Den Haag	FC Twente	Telstar	7	
2012–13	FC Twente	see BeNe League			
2013–14	FC Twente	see BeNe League			
2014–15	FC Twente	see BeNe League			
2015–16	FC Twente	Ajax	PSV	7	
2016–17	Ajax	FC Twente	PSV	8	
2017–18	Ajax	FC Twente	sc Heerenveen	9	
2018–19	FC Twente	Ajax	PSV	9	
2019–20	not awarded			8	
2020–21	FC Twente	PSV	Ajax	8	
2021–22	FC Twente	Ajax	PSV	9	
2022–23	Ajax	FC Twente	Fortuna Sittard	11	
2023–24	FC Twente	Ajax	PSV	12	
2024–25	FC Twente	PSV	Ajax	12	
2025–26	PSV	Ajax	Feyenoord	12	

=== Titles by club ===
Includes titles won as the best Dutch club in the BeNe League.

Team	Titles
FC Twente	10
Ajax	3
AZ	3
ADO Den Haag	1
PSV	1

== Top scorers ==
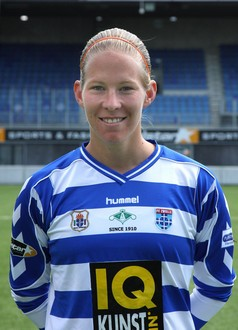
Sylvia Smit, two time top-scorer

Six players have led the Eredivisie in goals scored in two seasons: Sylvia Smit, Chantal de Ridder, Katja Snoeijs, Joëlle Smits, Fenna Kalma, and Jaimy Ravensbergen. Kalma has the two highest goal scoring seasons, with 33 goals in the 2021–22 season and 30 the following season. Tessa Wullaert of Belgium is the only non-Dutch international to lead the league in goals.

Season	Top scorer(s)	Goals	Club	Ref.
2007–08	(Netherlands) Karin Stevens	20	Willem II	
2008–09	(Netherlands) Sylvia Smit	14	Heerenveen	
2009–10	(Netherlands) Sylvia Smit	11	Heerenveen	
2009–10	(Netherlands) Chantal de Ridder	11	AZ	
2010–11	(Netherlands) Chantal de Ridder	19	AZ	
2011–12	(Netherlands) Priscilla de Vos	16	Telstar	
2015–16	(Netherlands) Jill Roord	20	Twente	
2016–17	(Netherlands) Katja Snoeijs	21	Telstar	
2017–18	(Netherlands) Katja Snoeijs	25	VV Alkmaar	
2018–19	(Netherlands) Tiny Hoekstra	27	Heerenveen	
2019–20	(Netherlands) Joëlle Smits	16	PSV	
2020–21	(Netherlands) Joëlle Smits	23	PSV	
2021–22	(Netherlands) Fenna Kalma	33	Twente	
2022–23	(Netherlands) Fenna Kalma	30	Twente	
2023–24	(Belgium) Tessa Wullaert	26	Fortuna Sittard	
2024–25	(Netherlands) Jaimy Ravensbergen	23	Twente	
2025–26	(Netherlands) Jaimy Ravensbergen	16	Twente	
2025–26	(Netherlands) Desiree van Lunteren	16	AZ	

== Player of the Year ==
From 2007 to 2012, the yearly Golden Shoe (Gouden Schoen) was awarded to the league's best player. "Vrouw & Voetbal" magazine started the prizes in 2007. The winner received a golden shoe-shaped trophy. In the 2009–10 season, the awards process was taken over by "Vrouwenvoetbal Nederland," which added an award for the best goalkeeper. In the 2010–11 season, an award for the most talented player was created.

Season	Golden shoe	Best goalkeeper	Talent of the year	Elected by
2007–08	(Belgium) Femke Maes (Willem II)	Not awarded	Not awarded	Vrouw & Voetbal
2008–09	(Netherlands) Sheila van den Bulk (ADO Den Haag) (Netherlands) Jeanine van Dalen (ADO Den Haag)	Not awarded	Not awarded	Vrouw & Voetbal
2009–10	(Netherlands) Kim Dolstra (AZ)	(Netherlands) Angela Christ (FC Utrecht)	Not awarded	VrouwenvoetbalNederland
2010–11	(Netherlands) Jorike Olde Loohuis (sc Heerenveen)	(Netherlands) Angela Christ (FC Utrecht)	(Netherlands) Tula de Wit (FC Utrecht)	VrouwenvoetbalNederland
2011–12	(Netherlands) Tessa Oudejans (FC Utrecht)	(Netherlands) Angela Christ (FC Utrecht)	(Netherlands) Jeslynn Kuijpers (VVV-Venlo)	VrouwenvoetbalNederland

In 2022, the Eredivisie began giving official awards to women's players for the Player of the Year and the Johan Cruyff Talent of the Year, awarded to the best player under the age of 21. The first three winners of the Player of the Year award were also the top goal scorers in the league.

In 2026, the Eredivisie first issued an award for the best goal. That year, the league gave its Oeuvre Award to Sarina Wiegman, England national team manager and former Netherlands national team manager, for her contribution to Dutch football.

Season	Player of the Year		Johan Cruyff Talent of the Year		Goal of the Year		Ref.
Season	Player	Club	Player	Club	Player	Club	Ref.
2021–22	(Netherlands) Fenna Kalma	FC Twente	(Netherlands) Wieke Kaptein	FC Twente			
2022–23	(Netherlands) Fenna Kalma	FC Twente	(Netherlands) Esmee Brugts	PSV			
2023–24	(Belgium) Tessa Wullaert	Fortuna Sittard	(United States) Lily Yohannes	Ajax			
2024–25	(Netherlands) Renate Jansen	PSV	(Netherlands) Veerle Buurman	PSV			
2025–26	(Japan) Mao Itamura	Feyenoord	(Netherlands) Renee van Asten	Ajax	(Netherlands) Sam de Jong	FC Utrecht	

== Naming rights ==
In February 2021, Pure Energie signed a contract with the KNVB for naming rights to the Vrouwen Eredivisie. Prior to the 2022–23 season, Azerion became the named sponsor on a deal lasting three seasons. In June 2025, Eurojackpot became the main sponsor for the league as well as the women's and men's national cup competitions.

== Broadcasting ==
All league matches are broadcast on ESPN in the Netherlands, as of the 2025–26 season. National broadcaster NOS has also broadcast some matches.

== See also ==
- BeNe League
- KNVB Women's Cup
- Women's football in the Netherlands
