= 2016–17 PEC Zwolle (women) season =

PEC Zwolle
2016–17 season
- Chairman: Adriaan Visser
- Manager: Carin Bakhuis
- Stadium: MAC³PARK stadion
- Eredivisie: 8th
- KNVB Cup: Semi-final
- Top goalscorer: League: (Netherlands) Rebecca Doejaaren (8); All: (Netherlands) Rebecca Doejaaren (9) (Netherlands) Yvette van Daelen (9)
| Home colours | Away colours |

The 2016–17 season is PEC Zwolle's 7th season of play in the Eredivisie and also its 7th consecutive season in the top flight of Dutch football for women.

== Competitions ==
=== Friendlies ===
| 12 August 2016 Friendly | PEC Zwolle | 1 – 1 | SC Buitenveldert | Zwolle |
| | Rebecca Doejaaren 41' | | 77' Sanne van Beek | Stadium: MAC³PARK Stadion |

| 17 August 2016 Friendly | DTS Ede | 1 – 7 | PEC Zwolle | Ede |
| | Unknown | | Anouk van Vilsteren (–); Judith Frijlink (–); Rebecca Doejaaren (–); Angenita Lemstra (–); Suzanne Giesen (–) |

| 26 August 2016 Friendly | (Germany) SGS Essen | 5 – 0 | PEC Zwolle | Wolfheze |
| | Unknown |

| 14 September 2016 Friendly | PEC Zwolle | 5 – 0 | SV Saestum | Zwolle |
| | Maxime Bennink (–); Yvette van Daelen (–); Rebecca Doejaaren (–) | | | Stadium: MAC³PARK Stadion |

| 18 September 2016 Friendly | (Germany) BV Cloppenburg | 2 – 0 | PEC Zwolle | (Germany) Cloppenburg |
| | Unknown |

=== Eredivisie ===
==== Results summary ====
| Overall | | | | | | | | Home | | | | | | Away | | | | | |
| Pld | W | D | L | GF | GA | GD | Pts | W | D | L | GF | GA | GD | W | D | L | GF | GA | GD |
|---|---|---|---|---|---|---|---|---|---|---|---|---|---|---|---|---|---|---|---|
| 21 | 2 | 3 | 16 | 24 | 65 | −41 | 9 | 1 | 1 | 9 | 11 | 33 | −22 | 1 | 2 | 7 | 13 | 32 | −19 |

Source: League matches

| 2 September 2016 1 | PEC Zwolle | 0 – 2 | Achilles '29 | Zwolle |
| | | Report | 31' Bonita Theunissen; 86' Yvette Derks | Stadium: MAC³PARK Stadion |

| 9 September 2016 2 | FC Twente | 1 – 0 | PEC Zwolle | Enschede |
| | Marthe Munsterman 4' | Report | | Stadium: De Grolsch Veste |

| 23 September 2016 3 | PEC Zwolle | 0 – 1 | ADO Den Haag | Zwolle |
| | | Report | 75' Victoria Pelova | Stadium: MAC³PARK Stadion |

| 30 September 2016 4 | Telstar | 1 – 1 | PEC Zwolle | Velsen |
| | Katja Snoeijs 64' | Report | 77' Maxime Bennink | Stadium: TATA Steel Stadion |

| 7 October 2016 5 | PEC Zwolle | 2 – 2 | SC Heerenveen | Zwolle |
| | 76', 90' Esmee de Graaf | Report | 60' Nathalie van den Heuvel; 76' Kim van Velzen | Stadium: MAC³PARK Stadion |

| 14 October 2016 6 | AFC Ajax | 5 – 0 | PEC Zwolle | Amsterdam |
| | Chantal de Ridder 37'; Desiree van Lunteren 43'; Kelly Zeeman 78'; Betsy Hassett 80'; Marjolijn van den Bighelaar 82' | Report | | Stadium: Sportpark De Toekomst |

| 28 October 2016 7 | PEC Zwolle | 0 – 2 | PSV Eindhoven | Zwolle |
| | | Report | 4' Kirsten Koopmans; 90+1' Vanity Lewerissa | Stadium: MAC³PARK Stadion |

| 4 November 2016 8 | Achilles '29 | 3 – 1 | PEC Zwolle | Groesbeek |
| | Michelle van der Laan 12'; Bonita Theunissen 61'; Joy Kersten 77' | Report | 66' Maxime Bennink | Stadium: Sportpark De Heikant |

| 11 November 2016 9 | PEC Zwolle | 1 – 4 | Telstar | Zwolle |
| | Rebecca Doejaaren 43' | Report | 61' Babische Roof; 63', 79' Katja Snoeijs; 90+2' Anne-Fleur Duppen | Stadium: MAC³PARK Stadion |

| 18 November 2016 10 | ADO Den Haag | 4 – 3 | PEC Zwolle | The Hague |
| | Lindsey Keizerwaard 60'; Pia Rijsdijk 68'; Sharona Tieleman 78'; Marthe van Erk 81' (pen.) | Report | 16' (o.g.) Fréderique Nieuwland; 21' Maxime Bennink; 69' Rebecca Doejaaren | Stadium: Kyocera Stadion |

| 2 December 2016 11 | PEC Zwolle | 1 – 4 | FC Twente | Zwolle |
| | Rebecca Doejaaren 23' | Report | 27', 59', 61' Eshly Bakker; 83' Renate Jansen | Stadium: MAC³PARK Stadion |

| 9 December 2016 12 | PEC Zwolle | 0 – 4 | AFC Ajax | Zwolle |
| | | Report | 45' Kelly Zeeman; 71' Soraya Verhoeve; 87' Betsy Hassett; 89' Inessa Kaagman | Stadium: MAC³PARK Stadion |

| 16 December 2016 13 | SC Heerenveen | 3 – 4 | PEC Zwolle | Heerenveen |
| | Nathalie van den Heuvel 9', 36'; Jassina Blom 14' | Report | 6' Esmee de Graaf; 52' Suzanne Giesen; 76' (pen.) Judith Frijlink; 90' Anouk van Vilsteren | Stadium: Sportpark Skoatterwâld |

| 23 December 2016 14 | PSV Eindhoven | 6 – 0 | PEC Zwolle | Eindhoven |
| | Jeslynn Kuipers 10', 29', 51'; Nadia Coolen 11'; Lucie Akkerman 36'; Sisca Folkertsma 49' | Report | | Stadium: Jan Louwers Stadion |

| 3 February 2017 15 | PEC Zwolle | 2 – 3 | ADO Den Haag | Zwolle |
| | Esmee de Graaf 29'; Rebecca Doejaaren 89' | Report | Victoria Pelova 39'; Sharona Tieleman 51'; Pia Rijsdijk 60' | Stadium: MAC³PARK Stadion |

| 17 February 2017 17 | PEC Zwolle | 0 – 5 | AFC Ajax | Zwolle |
| | | Report | Marjolijn van den Bighelaar 19', 81'; Desiree van Lunteren 53', 76'; Marlous Pieëte 84' | Stadium: MAC³PARK Stadion |

| 21 February 2017 16 | Achilles '29 | 3 – 2 | PEC Zwolle | Groesbeek |
| | Melanie Bross 58' 86'; Bonita Theunissen 81'; Michelle van der Laan (yellow card) 89' | Report | Rebecca Doejaaren 18'; Suzanne Giesen 50'; Merlin Tiemens (yellow card) 51'; Yvette van Daelen (yellow card) 74' | Stadium: Sportpark De Heikant |

| 24 February 2017 18 | PEC Zwolle | 1 – 3 | PSV Eindhoven | Zwolle |
| | Suzanne Giesen 64' | Report | Sisca Folkertsma 8'; Nadia Coolen 68'; Vanity Lewerissa 76' | Stadium: MAC³PARK Stadion |

| 17 March 2017 19 | FC Twente | 2 – 2 | PEC Zwolle | Enschede |
| | 39', 72' Ellen Jansen | Report | Judith Frijlink 3'; Maxime Bennink 7' | Stadium: De Grolsch Veste |

| 24 March 2017 20 | PEC Zwolle | 4 – 3 | Telstar | Zwolle |
| | Rebecca Doejaaren 3' 22'; Esmee De Graaf 41'; Nadja Olthuis (yellow card) 70'; Nurija van Schoonhoven (yellow card) 76'; Suzanne Giesen 78' | Report | Linda Bakker 43' 90+1'; Babiche Roof 70' (pen.) | Stadium: MAC³PARK Stadion; Referee: Pascal Arnts |

| 31 March 2017 21 | SC Heerenveen | 4 – 0 | PEC Zwolle | Heerenveen |
| | Tiny Hoekstra 23'; Laura Strik 31'; Nathalie van den Heuvel 58'; Jassina Blom 61' | Report | | Stadium: Sportpark Skoatterwâld; Referee: Mr. Berends |

=== Play-offs ===
| 21 April 2017 1 | PEC Zwolle | 3 – 1 | Achilles '29 | Zwolle |
| | Yvette van Daelen 50' 77'; Lydia Borg (yellow card) 70'; Judith Frijlink 87' | Report | Melanie Bross 61' | Stadium: MAC³PARK Stadion; Attendance: 377; Referee: Richard Kroesen |

| 28 April 2017 2 | Heerenveen | 5 – 1 | PEC Zwolle | Heerenveen |
| | Fenna Kalma 2'; Tiny Hoekstra 4', 49'; Simone Kets 42'; Elze Huls 57' | Report | 90' Judith Frijlink | Stadium: Sportpark Skoatterwâld; Attendance: 300; Referee: D. Karacaoglan |

| 5 May 2017 3 | PEC Zwolle | 1 – 2 | Telstar | Zwolle |
| | Lauri Weijkamp 78' | Report | 24' Babische Roof; 39' Linda Bakker | Stadium: MAC³PARK Stadion; Referee: Pascal Arnts |

| 12 May 2017 4 | Telstar | 4 – 3 | PEC Zwolle | Velsen |
| | Katja Snoeijs 31', 33', 45+1'; Jaimy Visser 47'; (yellow card) 77' Katja Snoeijs | Report | 52' Yvette van Daelen; 66' Esmee de Graaf; (yellow card) 77' Kirsten Bakker; 80' Anouk van Vilsteren | Stadium: Rabobank IJmond Stadion; Referee: Ferit Akkaya |

| 19 May 2017 5 | PEC Zwolle | 2 – 3 | Heerenveen | Zwolle |
| | Esmee de Graaf 17'; Esmee de Graaf (yellow card) 24'; Lydia Borg (yellow card) 27'; Yvette van Daelen (yellow card) 33'; Yvette van Daelen 69' | Report | (yellow card) 50' Wiëlle Douma; 52' Fenna Kalma; 62' Tiny Hoekstra; 65' Simone Kets; (yellow card) 90' Lieke Huls | Stadium: MAC³PARK Stadion; Attendance: 2,488; Referee: Rick Nelemans |

| 26 May 2017 6 | Achilles '29 | 2 – 1 | PEC Zwolle | Groesbeek |
| | Michelle van der Laan 90+2', 90+3' | Report | 65' Rebecca Doejaaren | Stadium: Sportpark De Heikant; Referee: Killy Mandemakers |

=== KNVB Cup ===
| 27 January 2017 Third round | PEC Zwolle Reserves | 0 – 4 | PEC Zwolle | Zwolle |
| | | Report | | Stadium: MAC³PARK Stadion |

| 11 March 2017 Quarter Final | PEC Zwolle | 3 – 2 | FC Twente | Zwolle |
| | Nurije van Schoonhoven 15'; Yvette van Daelen 30', 59' | Report | 42' Ellen Jansen; 45' Jill Roord | Stadium: MAC³PARK Stadion |

| 14 April 2017 Semi Final | PEC Zwolle | 1 – 3 | AFC Ajax | Zwolle |
| | Yvette van Daelen 12' | Report | 20', 73' Desiree van Lunteren; 67' Anouk Hoogendijk | Stadium: MAC³PARK Stadion; Attendance: 1,455 |

== Statistics ==
=== Squad details and appearances ===
| Nr. | Nat. | Name | Eredivisie | | KNVB Cup | | Total | | Season | Signed from | Debut |
| Nr. | Nat. | Name | G | Goal | G | Goal | G | Goal | Season | Signed from | Debut |
Goalkeepers
| 1 | (Netherlands) | Nadja Olthuis | 25 | 0 | 2 | 0 | 27 | 0 | 7th | (Netherlands) Heerenveen | 24 September 2015 |
| 16 | (Netherlands) | Carmen Molenkamp | 0 | 0 | 0 | 0 | 0 | 0 | 1st | Academy | – |
| 16 | (Netherlands) | Moon Pondes | 2 | 0 | 0 | 0 | 2 | 0 | 1st | (Netherlands) FC Twente | 5 May 2017 |
| 16 | (Netherlands) | Tirsa Postma | 0 | 0 | 0 | 0 | 0 | 0 | 1st | Academy | – |
Defenders
| 2 | (Netherlands) | Joos van Os | 20 | 0 | 2 | 0 | 22 | 0 | 1st | (Netherlands) FC Twente | 2 September 2016 |
| 3 | (Netherlands) | Pascalle Tang | 4 | 0 | 0 | 0 | 4 | 0 | 1st | (Netherlands) Heerenveen | 17 February 2017 |
| 4 | (Netherlands) | Kirsten Bakker | 17 | 0 | 1 | 0 | 18 | 0 | 2nd | (Netherlands) FC Twente | 21 August 2015 |
| 12 | (Netherlands) | Merlin Tiemens | 17 | 0 | 2 | 0 | 19 | 0 | 3rd | Academy | 23 January 2015 |
| 14 | (Netherlands) | Kyra Scheggetmann | 20 | 0 | 1 | 0 | 21 | 0 | 5th | Academy | 29 March 2013 |
| 15 | (Netherlands) | Hanna Groenenberg | 1 | 0 | 0 | 0 | 1 | 0 | 1st | Academy | 26 May 2017 |
| 22 | (Netherlands) | Lydia Borg | 18 | 0 | 2 | 0 | 20 | 0 | 5th | (Netherlands) Heerenveen | 23 September 2010 |
| 24 | (Netherlands) | Marije van Dam | 13 | 0 | 2 | 0 | 15 | 0 | 3rd | Academy | 2 September 2014 |
Midfielders
| 5 | (Netherlands) | Anouk van Vilsteren | 24 | 1 | 2 | 0 | 26 | 1 | 4th | Academy | 14 March 2014 |
| 6 | (Netherlands) | Nurija van Schoonhoven | 22 | 0 | 1 | 1 | 23 | 1 | 2nd | Academy | 6 November 2015 |
| 8 | (Netherlands) | Sharon Bruinenberg | 8 | 0 | 0 | 0 | 8 | 0 | 5th | Academy | 16 March 2013 |
| 10 | (Netherlands) | Suzanne Giesen | 25 | 4 | 2 | 0 | 27 | 4 | 3rd | (Netherlands) RKHVV | 2 September 2014 |
| 11 | (Netherlands) | Judith Frijlink | 26 | 4 | 2 | 0 | 28 | 4 | 7th | (Netherlands) ADO Den Haag | 2 September 2010 |
| 15 | (Netherlands) | Jeslin Niens | 2 | 0 | 0 | 0 | 2 | 0 | 1st | Academy | 18 November 2016 |
| 17 | (Netherlands) | Lauri Weijkamp | 13 | 1 | 1 | 0 | 14 | 1 | 2nd | Academy | 1 April 2016 |
| 20 | (Netherlands) | Angenita Lemstra | 7 | 0 | 0 | 0 | 7 | 0 | 1st | (Netherlands) Be Quick '28 | 2 September 2016 |
| – | (Netherlands) | Kely Pruim | 0 | 0 | 0 | 0 | 0 | 0 | 1st | Academy | – |
Forwards
| 7 | (Netherlands) | Esmee de Graaf | 26 | 7 | 2 | 1 | 28 | 8 | 2nd | (Netherlands) SV Saestum | 21 August 2015 |
| 9 | (Netherlands) | Yvette van Daelen | 23 | 4 | 2 | 5 | 25 | 9 | 5th | Academy | 9 November 2012 |
| 18 | (Netherlands) | Rebecca Doejaaren | 24 | 8 | 2 | 1 | 26 | 9 | 3rd | Academy | 20 February 2015 |
| 19 | (Netherlands) | Amy Banarsie | 1 | 0 | 0 | 0 | 1 | 0 | 2nd | Academy | 13 May 2016 |
| 21 | (Netherlands) | Maxime Bennink | 26 | 4 | 2 | 0 | 28 | 4 | 1st | (Netherlands) FC Twente | 19 September 2016 |
| No. | Nat. | Name | G | Goal | G | Goal | G | Goal | Season | Signed from | Debut |
| No. | Nat. | Name | Eredivisie | | KNVB Cup | | Total | | Season | Signed from | Debut |

=== Goalscorers ===
| Rank | Player | Position | Eredivisie | KNVB Cup | Total |
|---|---|---|---|---|---|
| 1 | (Netherlands) Rebecca Doejaaren | FW | 8 | 1 | 9 |
| 2 | (Netherlands) Yvette van Daelen | FW | 4 | 5 | 9 |
| 3 | (Netherlands) Esmee de Graaf | FW | 7 | 1 | 8 |
| 4 | (Netherlands) Suzanne Giesen | CM | 4 | 0 | 4 |
| 5 | (Netherlands) Maxime Bennink | FW | 4 | 0 | 4 |
| 6 | (Netherlands) Judith Frijlink | CM | 4 | 0 | 4 |
| 7 | (Netherlands) Anouk van Vilsteren | CM | 2 | 0 | 2 |
| 8 | (Netherlands) Lauri Weijkamp | CM | 1 | 0 | 1 |
| 9 | (Netherlands) Nurija van Schoonhoven | CM | 0 | 1 | 1 |
| Own goal(s) | | | 1 | 0 | 1 |
| Total | | | 35 | 8 | 43 |
