= List of AFC Ajax Vrouwen seasons =

This is a list of seasons played by AFC Ajax Vrouwen, the women's section of the Dutch football club AFC Ajax, since its establishment in 2012.

== Summary ==
Champions	Runners-up	Third place	Promoted	Relegated

Domestic and international results of AFC Ajax Vrouwen
Season	League										Cup	League Cup	Europe		League top scorers	
Season	Tier	Division	Pos	P	W	D	L	F	A	Pts	Cup	League Cup	Europe		1st	Goal
2012–13	1	BeNe League	4	28	12	6	10	47	36	42	QF				(Netherlands) van Lunteren	10
2013–14	1	BeNe League	3	24	16	6	4	68	23	54	W				(Netherlands) van Lunteren	13
2014–15	1	BeNe League	3	24	17	2	5	54	20	53	RU				(Netherlands) Pieëte	10
2015–16	1	Eredivisie	2	24	17	5	2	46	11	56	RU				(Netherlands) Bakker	8
2016–17	1	Eredivisie	1	27	21	5	1	57	14	68	W				(Netherlands) van den Bighelaar	18
2017–18	1	Eredivisie	1	24	16	7	1	57	24	55	W		Champions League	R32	(Netherlands) van Lunteren (Netherlands) van den Bighelaar	12
2018–19	1	Eredivisie	2	24	13	8	3	50	18	47	W		Champions League	R16	(Netherlands) Jansen	14
2019–20	1	Eredivisie	2	12	8	1	3	22	11	25	SF	3rd			(Netherlands) van den Bighelaar	12
2020–21	1	Eredivisie	3	20	13	1	6	40	21	40	SF	W	Champions League	R32	(Netherlands) Tromp	12
2021–22	1	Eredivisie	2	24	17	3	4	70	22	54	W	RU			(Netherlands) Leuchter	25
2022–23	1	Eredivisie	1	20	18	1	1	67	15	55	R16	RU	Champions League	R2	(Netherlands) Leuchter	17
2023–24	1	Eredivisie	2	22	17	3	2	62	20	54	W	SF	Champions League	QF	(Netherlands) Leuchter	20
