= 2016–17 Eredivisie (women) =

Eredivisie Vrouwen
- Season: 2016–17
- Dates: 2 September 2016 – 26 May 2017
- Champions: Ajax (1st title)
- UEFA Women's Champions League: Ajax
- Matches: 108
- Goals: 416 (3.85 per match)
- Top goalscorer: Katja Snoeijs (21 goals)
- Biggest home win: Twente 7–0 Achilles '29
- Biggest away win: ADO 1–7 Telstar
- Highest scoring: Telstar 2–7 Twente; Telstar 3–6 Ajax

The 2016–17 Eredivisie Vrouwen was the seventh season of the Netherlands women's professional football league. The season took place from 2 September 2016 to 26 May 2017 with eight teams. Defending champions FC Twente finished second behind Ajax, who won their first Dutch championship.

== Teams ==
Location of teams in the Eredivisie 2016–17

On 16 June 2016, Achilles '29 was confirmed as the eighth team of the season.

Team	City / Town	Venue(s)	Capacity
Achilles '29	Groesbeek	Sportpark De Heikant	4,500
ADO Den Haag	The Hague	Kyocera Stadion	15,000
ADO Den Haag	The Hague	Sportpark Nieuw Hanenburg	1,500
AFC Ajax	Amsterdam	Sportpark De Toekomst	2,000
SC Heerenveen	Heerenveen	Sportpark Skoatterwâld	3,000
SC Heerenveen	Heerenveen	Zuidersportpark (Sneek)	3,150
PSV Eindhoven	Eindhoven	Jan Louwers Stadion	4,600
PSV Eindhoven	Eindhoven	Sportcomplex De Herdgang	2,500
Telstar	Velsen	Rabobank IJmond Stadion	3,625
Telstar	Velsen	Sportpark De Wending (Heerhugowaard)	1,000
Telstar	Velsen	AFAS Trainingscomplex (Wormerland)	1,000
FC Twente	Enschede	De Grolsch Veste	30,205
FC Twente	Enschede	Sportpark Slangenbeek (Hengelo)	2,000
FC Twente	Enschede	FC Twente-trainingscentrum (Hengelo)	1,000
PEC Zwolle	Zwolle	MAC³PARK Stadion	12,500
PEC Zwolle	Zwolle	Sportpark Ceintuurbaan	3,000

Source: Soccerway

== Format ==
The league adopted a new split-season format, which was used through the 2020–21 season. In the regular season, the eight teams played each other three times, for a total of 21 matches each. After those matches, the top four teams would qualify for a championship play-off and the bottom four teams would play a placement play-off. Teams played the other teams in their group twice, for a total of 6 matches. Points accumulated in the regular season were halved and added to the points of the play-off stage rounds for the final point total. At the time, KNVB women's football manager Minke Booij said the new format would strengthen competition and create more top matches.

The champion qualified to the UEFA Women's Champions League.

== Regular season ==
=== Standings ===
Pos	Team	Pld	W	D	L	GF	GA	GD	Pts	Qualification or relegation
1	Ajax	21	17	3	1	49	11	+38	54	Qualification to Championship play-off
2	Twente	21	13	4	4	62	25	+37	43	Qualification to Championship play-off
3	PSV Eindhoven	21	12	3	6	56	26	+30	39	Qualification to Championship play-off
4	ADO	21	12	3	6	43	35	+8	39	Qualification to Championship play-off
5	Telstar	21	6	4	11	42	52	−10	22	Qualification to Placement play-off
6	Heerenveen	21	5	3	13	32	47	−15	18	Qualification to Placement play-off
7	Achilles '29	21	5	1	15	21	68	−47	16	Qualification to Placement play-off
8	Zwolle	21	2	3	16	24	65	−41	9	Qualification to Placement play-off

Source: soccerway.com
Rules for classification: 1) Points; 2) Goal difference; 3) Number of goals scored; 4) Head-to-head points; 5) Head-to-head goal difference; 6) Head-to-head away goals scored

=== Results ===
Home \ Away	ACH	ADO	AJX	HEE	PSV	TEL	TWE	ZWO	ACH	ADO	AJX	HEE	PSV	TEL	TWE	ZWO
Achilles '29		0–4	0–2	1–3	0–5	0–1	1–2	3–1		0–5		5–0				3–2
ADO Den Haag	4–1		0–2	2–1	3–1	3–1	3–2	4–3				2–2	1–0	1–7	0–2	
Ajax	1–0	1–1		2–0	2–1	3–0	1–0	5–0	6–1	1–0					1–0	
Heerenveen	6–0	2–1	0–1		2–1	2–2	1–3	3–4			0–1		1–2	2–3		4–0
PSV/FCE	0–0	3–3	1–2	6–0		5–1	2–5	6–0	5–0		1–0			4–0		
Telstar	6–1	1–2	3–6	2–0	1–3		1–3	1–1	1–2		1–1				2–7	
Twente	7–1	3–0	2–2	4–1	1–1	1–1		1–0	7–0			3–0	3–4			2–2
PEC Zwolle	0–2	0–1	0–4	2–2	0–2	1–4	1–4			2–3	0–5		1–3	4–3		

Updated to match(es) played on unknown. Source: soccerway.com
Legend: Blue = home team win; Yellow = draw; Red = away team win.

== Play-offs ==
=== Championship ===
The top four were set after matchday 18. Points from the regular season were halved.

Standings

Pos	Team	Pld	W	D	L	GF	GA	GD	BP	Pts	Qualification or relegation
1	Ajax	6	4	2	0	8	3	+5	27	41	2017–18 UEFA Women's Champions League
2	Twente	6	4	2	0	12	4	+8	22	36	
3	PSV Eindhoven	6	1	0	5	4	8	−4	20	23	
4	ADO	6	1	0	5	4	13	−9	20	23	

Source: soccerway.com
Rules for classification: 1) Points; 2) Goal difference; 3) Number of goals scored; 4) Head-to-head points; 5) Head-to-head goal difference; 6) Head-to-head away goals scored

Results

Home \ Away	ADO	AJX	PSV	TWE
ADO Den Haag		0–1	2–1	1–2
Ajax	2–1		1–0	1–1
PSV/FCE	2–0	0–2		0–1
Twente	5–0	1–1	2–1	

Updated to match(es) played on unknown. Source: soccerway.com
Legend: Blue = home team win; Yellow = draw; Red = away team win.

=== Placement ===
The bottom four were set after matchday 18. Points from the regular season were halved.

Standings

Pos	Team	Pld	W	D	L	GF	GA	GD	BP	Pts
1	Telstar	6	5	0	1	19	13	+6	11	26
2	Heerenveen	6	4	0	2	21	13	+8	9	21
3	Achilles '29	6	2	0	4	8	16	−8	8	14
4	Zwolle	6	1	0	5	11	17	−6	5	8

Source: soccerway.com
Rules for classification: 1) Points; 2) Goal difference; 3) Number of goals scored; 4) Head-to-head points; 5) Head-to-head goal difference; 6) Head-to-head away goals scored

Results

Home \ Away	ACH	HEE	TEL	ZWO
Achilles '29		1–3	3–0	2–1
Heerenveen	5–0		2–5	5–1
Telstar	4–1	4–3		4–3
PEC Zwolle	3–1	2–3	1–2	

Updated to match(es) played on unknown. Source: soccerway.com
Legend: Blue = home team win; Yellow = draw; Red = away team win.

== Top scorers ==
=== Overall ===
Rank	Player	Club	Goals
1	(Netherlands) Katja Snoeijs	Telstar	21
2	(Netherlands) Marjolijn van den Bighelaar	AFC Ajax	19
2	(Netherlands) Ellen Jansen	FC Twente	19
4	(Netherlands) Simone Kets	Heerenveen	16
5	(Netherlands) Babiche Roof	Telstar	15
6	(Netherlands) Vanity Lewerissa	PSV Eindhoven	13
7	(Netherlands) Linda Bakker	Telstar	12
8	(Belgium) Jassina Blom	Heerenveen	10
8	(Netherlands) Pia Rijsdijk	ADO	10
10	(Netherlands) Lineth Beerensteyn	FC Twente	9
10	(Netherlands) Desiree van Lunteren	AFC Ajax	9
10	(Netherlands) Myrthe Moorrees	PSV Eindhoven	9
10	(Netherlands) Jill Roord	FC Twente	9

Source: vrouwenvoetbalnederland.nl

=== Regular season ===
Rank	Player	Club	Goals
1	(Netherlands) Ellen Jansen	FC Twente	17
2	(Netherlands) Katja Snoeijs	Telstar	16
3	(Netherlands) Vanity Lewerissa	PSV Eindhoven	13
3	(Netherlands) Marjolijn van den Bighelaar	AFC Ajax	13
5	(Netherlands) Pia Rijsdijk	ADO	10
5	(Netherlands) Babiche Roof	Telstar	10
7	(Netherlands) Linda Bakker	Telstar	9
7	(Netherlands) Jill Roord	FC Twente	9
7	(Netherlands) Desiree van Lunteren	AFC Ajax	9
10	(Netherlands) Lineth Beerensteyn	FC Twente	8
10	(Belgium) Jassina Blom	Heerenveen	8
10	(Netherlands) Simone Kets	Heerenveen	8
13	(Netherlands) Rebecca Doejaaren	Zwolle	7
13	(Netherlands) Myrthe Moorrees	PSV Eindhoven	7
13	(Netherlands) Victoria Pelova	ADO	7

As of 1 April 2017.

=== Play-offs ===
Championship group
As of 26 May 2017.

Rank	Player	Club	Goals
1	(Netherlands) Marjolijn van den Bighelaar	AFC Ajax	5
2	(Netherlands) Ellen Jansen	FC Twente	3
4	(Netherlands) Eshley Bakker	FC Twente	2
4	(Netherlands) Marthe van Erk	ADO	2

Placement group
As of 26 May 2017.

Rank	Player	Club	Goals
1	(Netherlands) Simone Kets	Heerenveen	8
2	(Netherlands) Babiche Roof	Telstar	5
2	(Netherlands) Katja Snoeijs	Telstar	5
4	(Netherlands) Tiny Hoekstra	Heerenveen	4
4	(Netherlands) Yvette van Daelen	Zwolle	4
6	(Netherlands) Linda Bakker	Telstar	3
6	(Netherlands) Fenna Kalma	Heerenveen	3
6	(Netherlands) Michelle van der Laan	Achilles '29	3
9	(Belgium) Jassina Blom	Heerenveen	2
9	(Netherlands) Esmee de Graaf	Zwolle	2
9	(Netherlands) Judith Frijlink	Zwolle	2
9	(Netherlands) Elze Huls	Heerenveen	2
9	(Netherlands) Cherise Schelts	Telstar	2
9	(Netherlands) Sanne van der Velden	Telstar	2
