= Caitlin Dijkstra =

Dutch footballer (born 1999)

- Dijkstra in 2026

Personal information
- Full name: Caitlin Johanna Philomena Dijkstra
- Date of birth: 30 January 1999 (age 27)
- Place of birth: Breda, Netherlands
- Height: 1.70 m (5 ft 7 in)
- Position: Defender

Team information
- Current team: Tottenham Hotspur
- Number: 4

Youth career
- 2005–2015: RKVV JEKA
- 2015–2018: CTO Eindhoven

Senior career*
Years	Team	Apps	(Gls)
2018–2021	Ajax	38	(0)
2021–2023	Twente	42	(7)
2023–2026	VfL Wolfsburg	29	(2)
2023–2024	→ Twente (loan)	22	(1)
2026–	Tottenham Hotspur	4	(1)

International career^{‡}
2015–2016	Netherlands U17	3	(0)
2016–2018	Netherlands U19	26	(1)
2018	Netherlands U20	6	(0)
2019–2021	Netherlands U23	9	(1)
2021–	Netherlands	36	(1)
- * Club domestic league appearances and goals as of 13 September 2026 ‡ National team caps and goals as of 9 October 2026

Caitlin Johanna Philomena Dijkstra (born 30 January 1999) is a Dutch professional footballer who plays as defender for Women's Super League club Tottenham Hotspur and the Netherlands national team.

== Club career ==
Dijkstra's father Meindert was a professional footballer, though both are in no way related to Edsger W. Dijkstra. She grew up in Breda as a supporter of NAC, but played for RKVV JEKA as NAC had no girls' section. She progressed to CTO Eindhoven, where she combined football with studies, before she signed for reigning national champions AFC Ajax in 2018. She made her first team debut that October as a substitute in a daunting 2018–19 UEFA Women's Champions League tie with Lyon. With Ajax she won the KNVB Women's Cup in her first season with the club.

In April 2021 Dijkstra decided to leave Ajax for FC Twente upon the expiry of her contract that summer. Ajax's acquisition of Stefanie van der Gragt had reduced Dijkstra's opportunities to play in her favoured defensive role. At Twente Dijkstra signed for one year with the option of an additional year. She made her league debut against VV Alkmaar on 27 August 2021. Dijkstra scored her first league goal against Excelsior on 19 December 2021, scoring in the 75th minute.

On 22 June 2023, it was announced that Dijkstra would leave Twente to join Wolfsburg, but would spend one more year on loan at Twente. During her second spell at the club, she made her league debut against Telstar on 16 September 2023. During her second spell, Dijkstra scored her first league goal against Utrecht on 21 April 2024, scoring in the 90th minute.

On 27 May 2026, Women's Super League club Tottenham Hotspur announced the signing of Dijkstra.

== International career ==
At youth level Dijkstra played three times for the Netherlands women's national under-17 football team and 26 times for the Netherlands women's national under-19 football team. She played six times at under-20 level, including at the 2018 FIFA U-20 Women's World Cup in France. She then served as captain of the under-23 selection.

In September 2021, national team coach Mark Parsons called up Dijkstra to the senior Netherlands squad for the first time. On 29 November 2021 she played the full match in a 0–0 friendly draw with Japan in The Hague to win her first official cap. She scored her first goal on 19 February 2022 in a 3–0 victory against Finland.

On 31 May 2023, she was named as part of the Netherlands provisional squad for the 2023 FIFA Women's World Cup.

Alongside Lize Kop and Romée Leuchter, Dijkstra had to drop out of the Netherlands squad. They were replaced by Jacintha Weimar, Ilse van der Zanden and Fenna Kalma.

== Personal life ==
Dijkstra is in a relationship with Vera ten Westeneind.

== Career statistics ==
=== International ===
As of match played 9 October 2026

Appearances and goals by national team and year
National team	Year	Apps	Goals
Netherlands	2021	1	0
Netherlands	2022	5	1
Netherlands	2023	13	0
Netherlands	2024	4	0
Netherlands	2025	11	0
Netherlands	2026	2	0
Total		36	1

Scores and results list Netherlands' goal tally first, score column indicates score after each Dijkstra goal.

List of international goals scored by Caitlin Dijkstra
No.	Date	Venue	Opponent	Score	Result	Competition
1	19 February 2022	Stade Océane, Le Havre, France	Finland	1–0	3–0	2022 Tournoi de France
