= Linda Bakker =

Dutch footballer

Personal information
- Date of birth: 13 February 1993 (age 33)
- Place of birth: Rustenburg, Netherlands
- Height: 1.63 m (5 ft 4 in)
- Position: Midfielder

Youth career
- sc Dynamo
- SVW '27
- VV Reiger Boys

College career
Years	Team	Apps	(Gls)
2011	Loyola Marymount Lions	20	(2)

Senior career*
Years	Team	Apps	(Gls)
2009–2010	VV Reiger Boys		
2010–2011	AZ Alkmaar	18	(2)
2012–2014	Ajax	44	(5)
2014–2017	SC Telstar	70	(24)
2017–2021	Ajax	72	(10)
2021–2023	Valencia	23	(1)

International career^{‡}
2010	Netherlands U17	6	(1)
2010–2011	Netherlands U19	13	(5)
- * Club domestic league appearances and goals as of 17:24, 14 May 2024 (UTC) ‡ National team caps and goals as of 14:29, 11 December 2021 (UTC)

Linda Bakker (born 13 February 1993) is a Dutch professional footballer who last played as midfielder for Valencia CF.

== Club career ==
=== AZ Alkmaar ===
She joined AZ Alkmaar of the Eredivisie for 2010–11 season. Bakker made her league debut against PEC Zwolle on 2 September 2010. She made her league debut against Willem II on 4 November 2010, scoring in the 90th minute.

=== Loyola Marymount Lions ===
In 2011 she spent time at Loyola Marymount University and played college soccer for the "Lions". She started all 20 of the team's matches in her freshman season and scored two goals.

=== First spell at Ajax ===
Bakker made her league debut against Heerenveen on 24 August 2012. She scored her first league goal against Utrecht on 31 August 2012, scoring in the 29th minute.

=== SC Telstar ===
Bakker made her league debut against Club Brugge on 29 August 2014. She scored her first league goal against PSV on 2 September 2014, scoring in the 6th minute.

=== Second spell at Ajax ===
During her second spell at Ajax, Bakker made her league debut against Achilles '29 on 3 September 2017. She scored her first league goal against Alkmaar on 27 October 2017, scoring in the 63rd minute.

=== Valencia ===
She transferred to Valencia CF in July 2021. Bakker made her league debut against FC Barcelona on 25 September 2021. She scored her first league goal against Real Betis on 2 November 2022, scoring in the 10th minute.

== International career ==
At youth level Bakker played six times for the Netherlands women's national under-17 football team, scoring one goal and 13 times for the Netherlands women's national under-19 football team, scoring five goals.
