= Anna Knol =

Dutch footballer (born 2001)

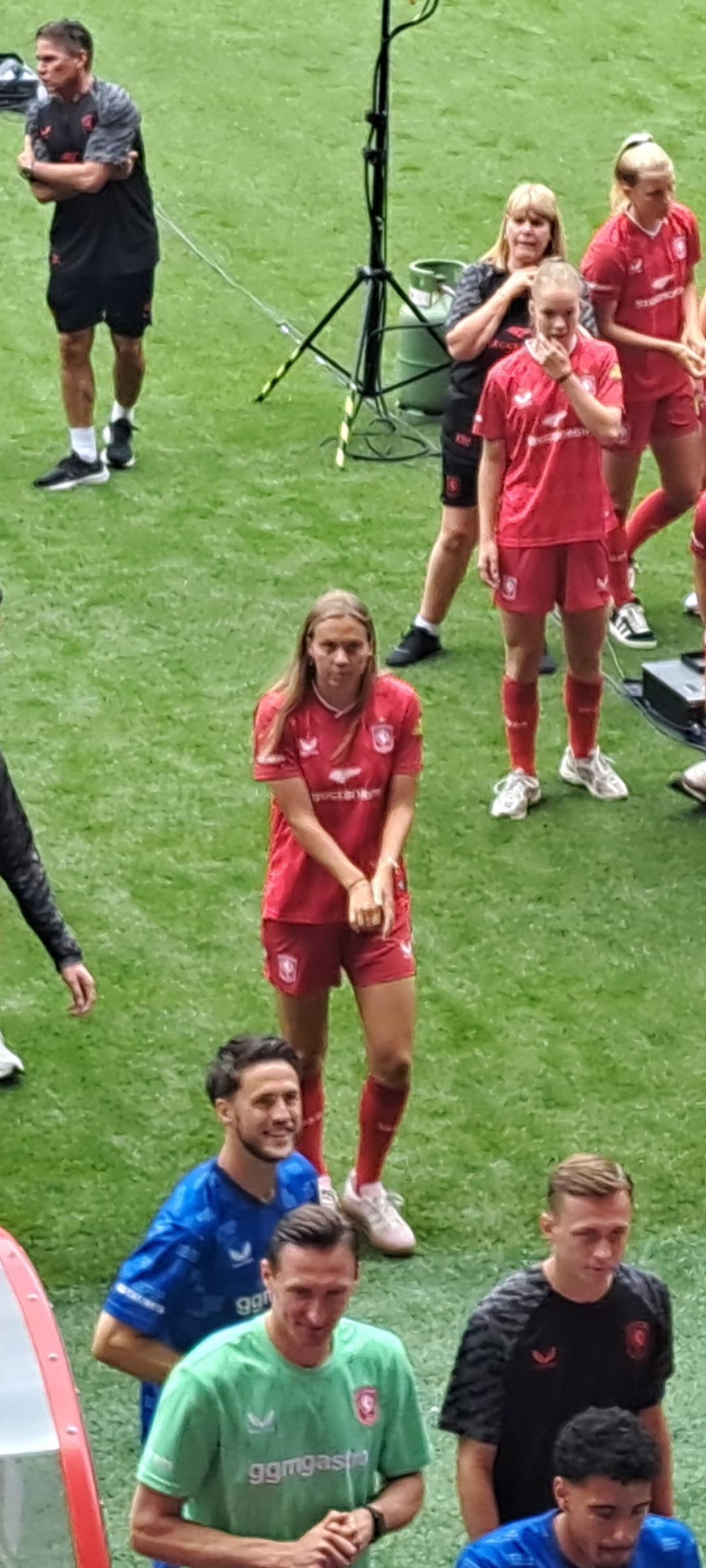
- Knol (centre) in July 2025

Personal information
- Full name: Anna Vera Knol
- Date of birth: 13 June 2001 (age 25)
- Place of birth: Nibbixwoud, Netherlands
- Position: Midfielder

Team information
- Current team: Ajax
- Number: 5

Senior career*
Years	Team	Apps	(Gls)
2017–2020	VV Alkmaar	45	(7)
2020–2022	Empoli	29	(1)
2022–2024	Fortuna Sittard	42	(0)
2024–2026	Twente	43	(0)
2026–	Ajax	0	(0)

International career
2016	Netherlands U15	4	(2)
2017	Netherlands U16	7	(3)
2017	Netherlands U17	3	(0)
- * Club domestic league appearances and goals as of 14:53, 5 August 2026 (UTC)

Anna Vera Knol (born 13 June 2001) is a Dutch professional footballer who plays as a midfielder for Vrouwen Eredivisie club Ajax.

== Club career ==
=== VV Alkmaar ===
Knol made her league debut against Heerenveen on 1 September 2017. She scored her first league goal against Achilles '29 on 7 September 2018, scoring in the 52nd minute.

=== Empoli ===
Knol made her league debut against San Marino Academy on 23 August 2020. She scored her first league goal against Inter Milan on 2 May 2021, scoring in the 89th minute. On 26 May 2021, Knol and her teammate Chanté Dompig signed new one year deals. In March 2022, Knol suffered an ankle ligament injury, ending her season.

=== Fortuna Sittard ===
In June 2022, it was announced that Knol would join Fortuna Sittard. During her time at Fortuna, she didn't miss a single minute in the league over two seasons. She made her league debut against Ajax on 16 September 2022.

=== Twente ===
On 30 May 2024, it was announced that Knol had joined Twente.

Ajax

In May 2026, Knol joined fellow Eredivisie club Ajax on a three-year contract.

== Honours ==
Twente

- Eredivisie: 2024–25
- KNVB Women's Cup: 2024–25
- Dutch Women's Super Cup: 2024
