= Romée Leuchter =

Dutch footballer (born 2001)

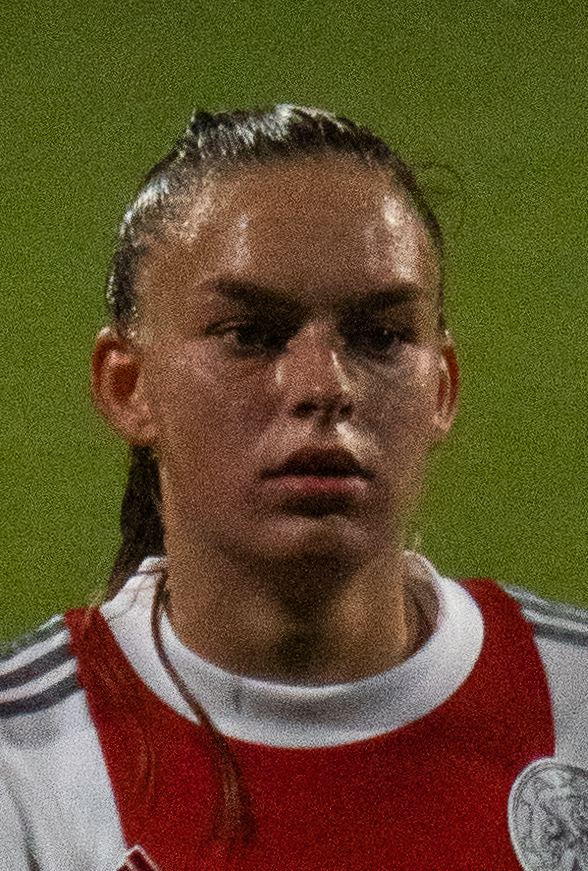
- Leuchter with Ajax in 2021

Personal information
- Full name: Romée Elke Henk Leuchter
- Date of birth: 12 January 2001 (age 25)
- Place of birth: Heerlen, Netherlands
- Height: 1.67 m (5 ft 6 in)
- Position: Striker

Team information
- Current team: Paris Saint-Germain
- Number: 17

Youth career
- CTO Zuid

Senior career*
Years	Team	Apps	(Gls)
2019–2021	PSV	16	(4)
2021–2024	Ajax	60	(62)
2024–	Paris Saint-Germain	42	(26)

International career^{‡}
2015–2016	Netherlands U15	8	(3)
2016–2017	Netherlands U16	7	(2)
2016–2018	Netherlands U17	20	(19)
2018–2019	Netherlands U19	17	(9)
2021–2023	Netherlands U23	9	(6)
2022–	Netherlands	32	(6)
- * Club domestic league appearances and goals as of 23 October 2026 ‡ National team caps and goals as of 9 June 2026

Romée Elke Henk Leuchter (born 12 January 2001) is a Dutch professional footballer who plays as a striker for Première Ligue club Paris Saint-Germain and the Netherlands national team.

== Club career ==
=== Youth ===
Leuchter first played at CTO Zuid, a training center set up by the Ministry of Health, Welfare, and Sport to promote youth sport, including girls' football, in the Netherlands.

=== PSV ===
Leuchter made her debut for PSV on 23 August 2019 as a 61st-minute substitute for Naomi Pattiwael in a 4–1 league win against Heerenveen. It was her only league appearance that season. She made 15 league appearances in the following season. Leuchter scored for the first time with a brace in a 2–1 home win over Ajax on 17 March 2021, scoring in the 41st and 49th minute. She won her first trophy of her career, the KNVB Women's Cup, on 5 June 2021 in front of the crowd at the Yanmar Stadion by beating ADO Den Haag in the final with a result of 1–0.

=== Ajax ===
On 7 June 2021, Ajax announced the signing of Leuchter on a three-year deal. She scored on her league debut against Excelsior Rotterdam on 27 August 2021, scoring in the 27th minute. In September 2022, she scored a double against Arsenal, securing a 2–2 draw for Ajax in the second qualifying round first leg of the Champions League. The following season, at the same stage of the competition, Ajax faced FC Zürich. Leuchter took Ajax to qualification by scoring a hat-trick in the first leg and a brace in the second leg.

Leuchter scored a hat-trick for Ajax on 14 March 2024 in a 5–1 cup win over Jong Ajax, thus taking her total goal tally for the club to 81. This made her the all-time top scorer of the team, surpassing Marjolijn van den Bighelaar who held the record with 79 goals. With 86 goals from 89 matches, she left the club as their all-time top scorer in June 2024 following the expiry of her contract.

=== Paris Saint-Germain ===
On 9 July 2024, Leuchter joined French club Paris Saint-Germain on a three-year contract until June 2027.

== International career ==
Leuchter began to be called up by the Dutch Football Federation in 2015, wearing the shirt of the Under-15 team that year, with which she made her debut in a friendly against Belgium on 29 May, and then continued throughout the following years the youth team from Under-16 onwards.

With the Under-17, she initially played in the 2017 European Championship in the Czech Republic, where coach Marleen Wissink used her in all 4 matches played by her national team. Leuchter was fundamental in the passage to the group stage by scoring the second goal in the 2–1 victory over England, who were then eliminated in the semi-final by Spain. She took the field in all three group stage matches and was the best Dutch scorer of the tournament tied with Kirsten van de Westeringh. However, with a win, a draw, and a defeat, the Netherlands fail to progress to the next round.

Subsequently, again in 2018, she received her first call-up with the Under-19 team. She played a friendly match against the United States, drawing 1-1. Federal coach Jessica Torny included her in the squad for the 2019 European Championship qualification. She contributed 7 goals to reach the final stage, making a total of 10 appearances in the tournament, scoring a goal in the 5–0 victory over Norway in the group stage. Her team was eliminated in the semi-finals by Germany. She selected for the team of the tournament.

After being called up to the Under-23s in 2021, that same year she joined the senior national team, called up by coach Mark Parsons for the goalless friendly draw with Japan on 29 November. To make her debut she had to wait until the following year, replacing Lineth Beerensteyn in the 84th minute in the first match of the 2022 edition of the Tournoi de France which drew 1–1 with Brazil. After making 2 more appearances in friendlies and qualifiers for the 2023 World Cup in Australia and New Zealand, in May 2022 Parsons confirmed his trust in her by including her in the list of 23 players called up for the Euro 2022, scheduled from 6 to 31 July 2022 in England.

On 17 July 2022, Leuchter scored her first two senior team goals in a 4–1 Euro 2022 group stage win against Switzerland. On 31 May 2023, she was named as part of the Netherlands provisional squad for the 2023 FIFA Women's World Cup. In June 2025, she was named in the squad for the UEFA Women's Euro 2025.

== Career statistics ==
=== Club ===
As of match played 23 October 2026

Appearances and goals by club, season and competition
Club	Season	League			National cup (Note: Includes KNVB Women's Cup, Coupe de France Féminine)		League cup (Note: Includes Eredivisie Cup, Coupe LFFP)		Continental		Other		Total	
Club	Season	Division	Apps	Goals	Apps	Goals	Apps	Goals	Apps	Goals	Apps	Goals	Apps	Goals
PSV	2019–20	Vrouwen Eredivisie	1	0	0	0	0	0	—		—		1	0
PSV	2020–21	Vrouwen Eredivisie	15	4	3	1	2	0	1 (Note: Appearance(s) in UEFA Women's Champions League)	0	—		21	5
PSV	Total		16	4	3	1	2	0	1	0	0	0	22	5
Ajax	2021–22	Vrouwen Eredivisie	24	25	4	3	3	3	—		—		31	31
Ajax	2022–23	Vrouwen Eredivisie	18	17	1	0	1	1	4	2	1 (Note: Appearance in Dutch Women's Super Cup)	1	25	21
Ajax	2023–24	Vrouwen Eredivisie	18	20	3	4	0	0	11	9	1	1	33	34
Ajax	Total		60	62	8	7	4	4	15	11	2	2	89	86
Paris Saint-Germain	2024–25	Première Ligue	20	8	5	4	—		2	1	2 (Note: Appearance(s) in playoffs)	1	29	14
Paris Saint-Germain	2025–26	Première Ligue	19	18	4	4	2	1	5	0	1	0	31	23
Paris Saint-Germain	2026–27	Première Ligue	3	0	0	0	0	0	3	0	—		6	0
Paris Saint-Germain	Total		42	26	9	8	2	1	10	1	3	1	66	37
Career total			118	92	20	16	8	5	26	12	5	3	177	128

=== International ===
As of match played 9 June 2026

Appearances and goals by national team and year
National team	Year	Apps	Goals
Netherlands	2022	10	2
Netherlands	2023	2	0
Netherlands	2024	8	3
Netherlands	2025	6	0
Netherlands	2026	6	1
Total		32	6

Scores and results list Netherlands' goal tally first, score column indicates score after each Leuchter goal.

List of international goals scored by Romée Leuchter
No.	Date	Venue	Opponent	Score	Result	Competition
1	17 July 2022	Bramall Lane, Sheffield, England	Switzerland	2–1	4–1	UEFA Women's Euro 2022
2	17 July 2022	Bramall Lane, Sheffield, England	Switzerland	4–1	4–1	UEFA Women's Euro 2022
3	25 October 2024	De Vijverberg, Doetinchem, Netherlands	Indonesia	1–0	15–0	Friendly
4	25 October 2024	De Vijverberg, Doetinchem, Netherlands	Indonesia	4–0	15–0	Friendly
5	25 October 2024	De Vijverberg, Doetinchem, Netherlands	Indonesia	5–0	15–0	Friendly
6	9 June 2026	Asito Stadion, Almelo, Netherlands	Poland	2–0	3–1	2027 FIFA Women's World Cup qualification

== Honours ==
PSV

- KNVB Women's Cup: 2020–21

Ajax

- Vrouwen Eredivisie: 2022–23
- KNVB Women's Cup: 2021–22, 2023–24

Individual

- UEFA Women's Under-19 Championship team of the tournament: 2019
- UNFP Première Ligue team of the season: 2025–26
- LFFP Première Ligue team of the season: 2025–26
- Première Ligue top goalscorer: 2025–26
- Coupe de France Féminine top goalscorer: 2024–25
- Première Ligue Player of the Month: February 2026
