= 2018–19 Eredivisie (women) =

Eredivisie Vrouwen
- Season: 2018–19
- Dates: 7 September 2018 – 3 May 2019
- Champions: Twente (third title)
- Champions League: Twente
- Matches: 110
- Goals: 454 (4.13 per match)
- Top goalscorer: Tiny Hoekstra (27 goals)
- Biggest home win: Heerenveen 12–0 Achilles '29 (19 April 2019)
- Biggest away win: Achilles '29 1–9 ADO Den Haag (12 October 2018); Achilles '29 0–8 Twente (16 November 2018); Achilles '29 1–9 PSV (14 December 2018)
- Highest scoring: Heerenveen 12–0 Achilles '29 (19 April 2019)
- Longest winning run: 9 matches Twente
- Longest unbeaten run: 15 matches Twente
- Longest winless run: 15 matches Excelsior/Barendrecht
- Longest losing run: 9 matches Achilles '29; Excelsior/Barendrecht

The 2018–19 Eredivisie Vrouwen was the ninth season of the Netherlands women's professional football league. The season took place from 7 September 2018 to 3 May 2019 with nine teams. Twente won the league championship, its third Eredivisie title, after trailing PSV at the end of the regular season. Twente clinched its tile by defeating PSV in its penultimate match.

== Teams ==
Location of teams in the Eredivisie Vrouwen in 2018–19

The number of teams and specific teams was unchanged from the previous season, the first time the Eredivisie had such stability.

Team	City / Town	Venue(s)	Capacity
Achilles '29	Groesbeek	Sportpark De Heikant	4,500
ADO Den Haag	The Hague	Cars Jeans Stadion	15,000
ADO Den Haag	The Hague	Sportpark Nieuw Hanenburg	1,500
AFC Ajax	Amsterdam	Sportpark De Toekomst	2,000
VV Alkmaar	Alkmaar	Sportpark AFC '34	3,625
Excelsior/Barendrecht	Rotterdam	Van Donge & De Roo Stadion	4,500
Excelsior/Barendrecht	Rotterdam	Sportpark De Bongerd (Barendrecht)	2,100
sc Heerenveen	Heerenveen	Sportpark Skoatterwâld	3,000
sc Heerenveen	Heerenveen	Abe Lenstra Stadion	27,224
PSV Eindhoven	Eindhoven	Sportcomplex De Herdgang	2,500
FC Twente	Enschede	De Grolsch Veste	30,205
FC Twente	Enschede	Sportpark 't Wilbert (Hengelo)	2,000
PEC Zwolle	Zwolle	MAC³PARK Stadion	12,500

Source: Soccerway, Football Reference

== Format ==
The league's split-schedule format remained the same as the previous season. In the regular season, all nine teams played one another twice, once at home and once away, for a total of 16 matches each. Following those matches, the top five teams qualified for a championship play-offs and the bottom four teams for the placement group. Championship play-off teams played each twice, for a total of 8 matches each, while placement group teams played each other three times, for a total of 9 matches each. Points accumulated in the regular season were halved and added to the points of the playoff stage rounds. There was no relegation nor promotion, and the champion qualified to the 2019–20 UEFA Women's Champions League.

== Regular season ==
=== Standings ===
Pos	Team	Pld	W	D	L	GF	GA	GD	Pts	Qualification or relegation
1	PSV	16	13	1	2	54	11	+43	40	Qualification to Championship play-off
2	Twente	16	11	3	2	52	18	+34	36	Qualification to Championship play-off
3	Ajax	16	9	4	3	38	14	+24	31	Qualification to Championship play-off
4	ADO Den Haag	16	9	1	6	42	23	+19	28	Qualification to Championship play-off
5	PEC Zwolle	16	6	2	8	34	34	0	20	Qualification to Championship play-off
6	Alkmaar	16	6	2	8	24	40	−16	20	Qualification to Placement play-off
7	Heerenveen	16	5	4	7	34	36	−2	19	Qualification to Placement play-off
8	Excelsior/Barendrecht	16	2	1	13	14	44	−30	7	Qualification to Placement play-off
9	Achilles '29	16	2	0	14	10	82	−72	6	Qualification to Placement play-off

Source: Soccerway
Rules for classification: Season in progress: 1) Most points won; 2) Less points lost; 3) Goal difference; 4) Goals scored; 5) Alphabetical order; End of season: 1) Points; 2) Goal difference; 3) Goals scored; 4) Head-to-head points; 5) Head-to-head goal difference; 6) Head-to-head away goals scored; 7) Play-off if relevant for deciding champion, relegation or participating in a European league, otherwise by draw. 8) Penalty shoot-out (only after a play-off)

=== Results ===
Home \ Away	ACH	ADO	AJA	ALK	EXC	HEE	PEC	PSV	TWE
Achilles '29		1–9	0–4	0–2	1–0	2–6	3–2	1–9	0–8
ADO Den Haag	6–0		2–2	4–1	2–0	4–1	3–2	1–2	3–1
Ajax	3–0	1–0		2–0	5–0	3–0	3–1	2–0	1–2
Alkmaar	3–1	2–3	2–2		3–0	0–7	0–0	0–3	0–5
Excelsior/Barendrecht	5–1	2–0	0–6	0–2		2–2	2–3	0–3	1–3
Heerenveen	6–0	0–3	1–1	3–5	1–0		3–3	0–5	0–2
PEC Zwolle	10–0	1–0	3–1	1–2	3–1	0–3		1–3	4–2
PSV	5–0	2–1	1–0	5–0	3–0	6–1	4–0		3–3
Twente	4–0	5–1	2–2	4–2	6–1	0–0	4–0	1–0	

Source: Soccerway
Legend: Blue = home team win; Yellow = draw; Red = away team win.

== Play-offs ==
=== Championship ===
The top five teams were set after matchday 16. Points from the regular season were halved.

==== Standings ====
Pos	Team	Pld	W	D	L	GF	GA	GD	SP	Pts	Qualification or relegation
1	Twente (C)	8	5	2	1	18	9	+9	18	35	2019–20 UEFA Women's Champions League
2	Ajax	8	4	4	0	12	4	+8	16	32	
3	PSV	8	3	2	3	16	11	+5	20	31	
4	ADO Den Haag	8	1	4	3	13	19	−6	14	21	
5	PEC Zwolle	8	0	2	6	9	25	−16	10	12	

Source: Soccerway
Rules for classification: Season in progress: 1) Most points won; 2) Less points lost; 3) Goal difference; 4) Goals scored; 5) Alphabetical order; End of season: 1) Points; 2) Goal difference; 3) Goals scored; 4) Head-to-head points; 5) Head-to-head goal difference; 6) Head-to-head away goals scored; 7) Play-off if relevant for deciding champion, relegation or participating in a European league, otherwise by draw. 8) Penalty shoot-out (only after a play-off)
(C) Champions

==== Results ====
Home \ Away	ADO	AJA	PEC	PSV	TWE
ADO Den Haag		2–2	4–1	2–2	1–3
Ajax	1–1		0–0	1–0	2–0
PEC Zwolle	3–3	0–4		2–3	1–5
PSV	5–0	0–1	3–1		2–3
Twente	2–0	1–1	3–1	1–1	

Source: Soccerway
Legend: Blue = home team win; Yellow = draw; Red = away team win.

=== Placement ===
The bottom four teams were set after matchday 16. Points from the regular season were halved.

==== Standings ====
Pos	Team	Pld	W	D	L	GF	GA	GD	SP	Pts
1	Heerenveen	9	7	2	0	40	8	+32	10	33
2	Alkmaar	9	3	4	2	23	16	+7	10	23
3	Excelsior/Barendrecht	9	3	3	3	13	14	−1	4	16
4	Achilles '29	9	0	1	8	8	46	−38	3	4

Source: Soccerway
Rules for classification: Season in progress: 1) Most points won; 2) Less points lost; 3) Goal difference; 4) Goals scored; 5) Alphabetical order; End of season: 1) Points; 2) Goal difference; 3) Goals scored; 4) Head-to-head points; 5) Head-to-head goal difference; 6) Head-to-head away goals scored; 7) Play-off if relevant for deciding champion, relegation or participating in a European league, otherwise by draw. 8) Penalty shoot-out (only after a play-off)

==== Results ====
===== 1st and 2nd third =====
Home \ Away	ACH	ALK	EXC	HEE
Achilles '29		2–6	1–1	2–6
Alkmaar	5–2		2–2	1–1
Excelsior/Barendrecht	1–0	1–1		0–4
Heerenveen	6–0	1–1	3–0	

Source: Soccerway
Legend: Blue = home team win; Yellow = draw; Red = away team win.

===== 3rd third =====
Home \ Away	ACH	ALK	EXC	HEE
Achilles '29		1–4		
Alkmaar			0–2	3–4
Excelsior/Barendrecht	5–0			
Heerenveen	12–0		3–1	

Source: Soccerway
Legend: Blue = home team win; Yellow = draw; Red = away team win.

== Top Scorers ==
Rank	Player	Club	Goals
1	(Netherlands) Tiny Hoekstra	sc Heerenveen	27
2	(Netherlands) Joëlle Smits	FC Twente	25
3	(Netherlands) Katja Snoeijs	PSV	20
4	(Netherlands) Babiche Root	PEC Zwolle	18
4	(Netherlands) Renate Jansen	FC Twente	18
