= Desiree van Lunteren =

Dutch footballer

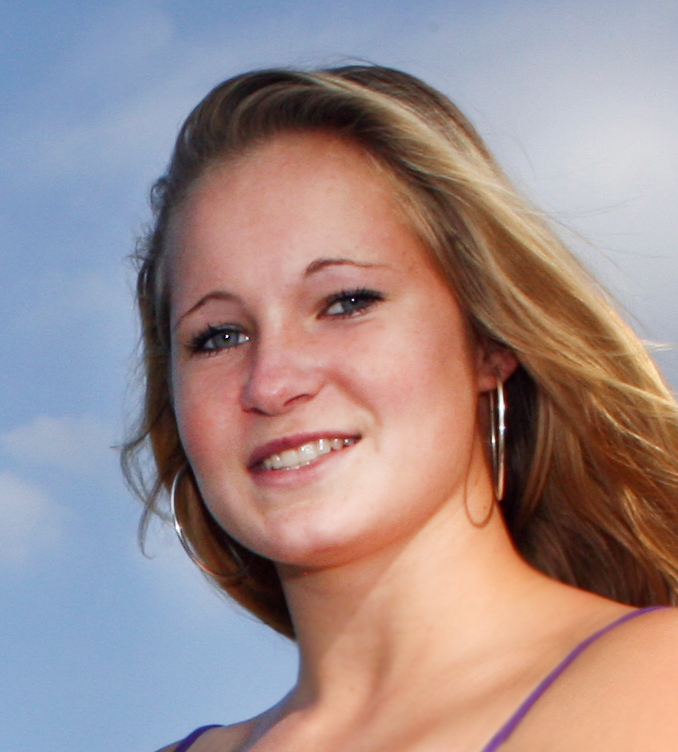
- Van Lunteren in 2009

Personal information
- Date of birth: 30 December 1992 (age 33)
- Place of birth: Almere, Netherlands
- Height: 1.70 m (5 ft 7 in)
- Positions: Midfielder; right-back

Team information
- Current team: AZ
- Number: 10

Youth career
- Sv Almere
- Sv Buiten Boys
- AS'80

Senior career*
Years	Team	Apps	(Gls)
2009–2011	AZ	36	(5)
2011–2012	Telstar	16	(4)
2012–2018	Ajax	142	(58)
2018–2019	SC Freiburg	20	(2)
2019–2021	Ajax	11	(3)
2021–2022	PSV	24	(10)
2023–	AZ	43	(20)

International career
2008	Netherlands U16	4	(0)
2008–2009	Netherlands U17	9	(2)
2008–2011	Netherlands U19	27	(0)
2012–2019	Netherlands	84	(0)
Medal record
Women's football
Representing the Netherlands
FIFA Women's World Cup
Silver medal – second place	2019 France
UEFA Women's Championship
Gold medal – first place	2017 Netherlands
- * Club domestic league appearances and goals as of 17 May 2025

Desiree van Lunteren (Dutch pronunciation: [deːziˈreː vɑn ˈlʏntərə(n)]; born 30 December 1992) is a Dutch footballer who plays as a right-back or a midfielder for AZ in the Eredivisie Vrouwen.

== Club career ==
=== First spell at AZ ===
Van Lunteren began her senior career at Eredivisie team AZ Alkmaar. She made her league debut against Twente on 15 October 2009. Van Lunteren scored her first league goal against VVV on 30 September 2010.

=== Telstar ===
Van Lunteren made her league debut against ADO Den Haag on 9 September 2011. She scored her first league goal against Heerenveen on 30 September 2011, scoring in the 52nd minute.

=== First spell at Ajax ===
Van Lunteren scored on her league debut against Heerenveen on 24 August 2012, scoring in the 27th minute. She scored a hattrick against Club Brugge on 17 January 2014. Van Lunteren scored a hattrick against Anderlecht on 30 May 2014.

=== SC Freiburg ===
In June 2018, a personal sponsor helped her move to SC Freiburg, departing Ajax after 6 years and 166 matches. She made her league debut against SC Sand on 16 September 2018. Van Lunteren scored her first league goal against SC Sand on 9 December 2018, scoring in the 49th minute.

=== Second spell at Ajax ===
In July 2019, after one season in Germany, van Lunteren returned to Ajax on a two-year contract. She scored on her league debut against Alkmaar on 25 August 2019, scoring in the 31st minute.

=== PSV ===
On 10 March 2021, it was announced that van Lunteren had joined PSV on a two-year deal. She scored on her league debut against PEC Zwolle on 27 August 2021, scoring in the 44th minute. In 2022, van Lunteren retired.

=== Second spell at AZ ===
In 2023, van Lunteren came out of retirement and signed for AZ. She made her league debut against Excelsior Rotterdam on 8 September 2023. She scored her first league goal against ADO Den Haag on 5 November 2023. Van Lunteren scored a hattrick against Telstar on 1 May 2024. On 28 March 2024, van Lunteren's contract was renewed until mid 2025.

== International career ==
Van Lunteren was handed her first senior national team cap by coach Roger Reijners on 15 February 2012, in a 2–1 friendly defeat to France in Nîmes.

She was called up to be part of the national team for the 2013. and the 2017 UEFA Women's Euros. At the 2017 tournament, Van Lunteren started 5 of the team's 6 games and helped the team win the tournament. She assisted a goal in the final before being subbed off in the 57th minute. After the tournament, the whole team was honoured by the Prime Minister Mark Rutte and Minister of Sport Edith Schippers and made Knights of the Order of Orange-Nassau.

Van Lunteren was an integral part of the Dutch team that finished second in the 2019 FIFA Women's World Cup in France, playing in every match.

She retired from the national team on 21 November 2019.

== Honours ==
AZ Alkmaar

- Eredivisie: 2009–10
- KNVB Women's Cup: 2010–11

AFC Ajax

- Eredivisie: 2016–17, 2017–18
- KNVB Women's Cup: 2013–14, 2016–17, 2017–18

Netherlands

- UEFA Women's Euro: 2017
- Algarve Cup: 2018

Individual

- Knight of the Order of Orange-Nassau: 2017
