= Lineth Beerensteyn =

Dutch footballer (born 1996)

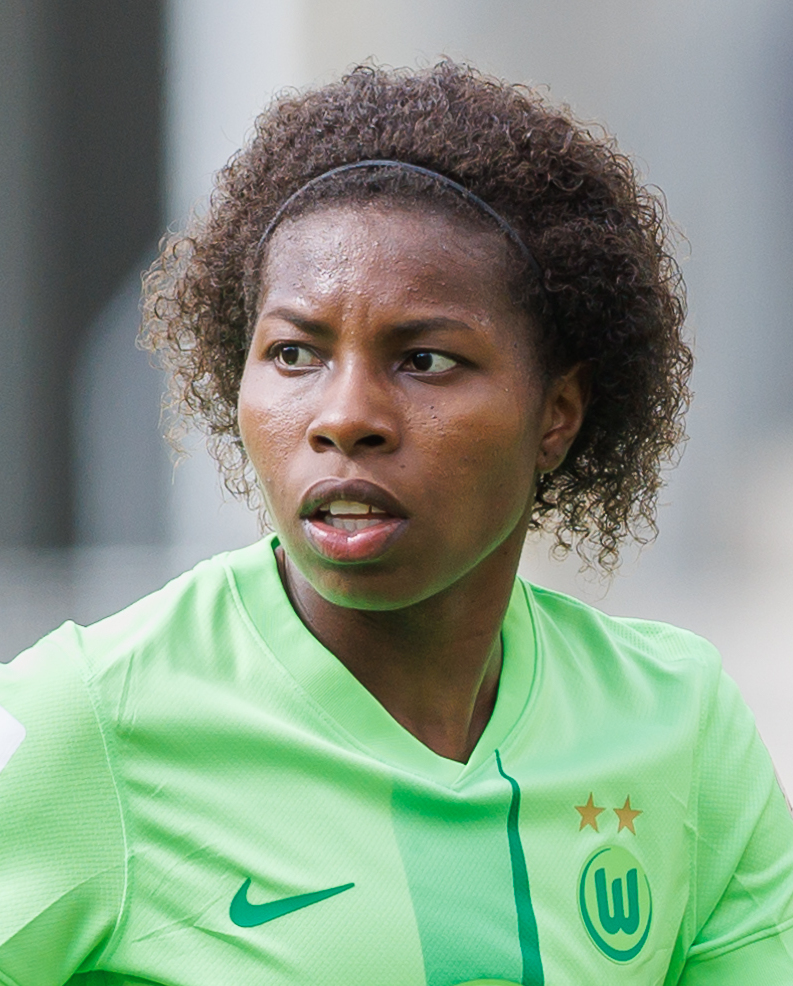
- Beerensteyn with VfL Wolfsburg in 2024

Personal information
- Full name: Lineth Enid Fabienne Beerensteyn
- Date of birth: 11 October 1996 (age 30)
- Place of birth: The Hague, Netherlands
- Height: 1.61 m (5 ft 3 in)
- Position: Forward

Team information
- Current team: Real Madrid
- Number: 11

Youth career
- DHC Delft
- ADO Den Haag

Senior career*
Years	Team	Apps	(Gls)
2012–2016	ADO Den Haag	85	(39)
2016–2017	Twente	21	(9)
2017–2022	Bayern Munich	87	(17)
2018	Bayern Munich II	1	(1)
2022–2024	Juventus	44	(18)
2024–2026	VfL Wolfsburg	41	(25)
2026–	Real Madrid	10	(4)

International career^{‡}
2011	Netherlands U15	2	(0)
2012	Netherlands U16	4	(0)
2012–2013	Netherlands U17	8	(0)
2014–2015	Netherlands U19	11	(3)
2016–	Netherlands	127	(45)
Medal record
Women's football
Representing the Netherlands
FIFA Women's World Cup
Runner-up	2019 France
UEFA Women's Championship
Winner	2017 Netherlands
UEFA Women's Under-19 Championship
Winner	2014 Norway
- * Club domestic league appearances and goals as of 16:40, 12 November 2026 (UTC) ‡ National team caps and goals as of 13 October 2026

Lineth Enid Fabienne Beerensteyn (Dutch: [liˈnɛt eːˈnit faːˈbjɛn(ə) ˈbeːrə(n)stɛin]; born 11 October 1996) is a Dutch professional footballer who plays as a forward for Liga F club Real Madrid and the Netherlands national team.

== Club career ==
=== ADO Den Haag ===
Beerensteyn started playing football in Delft, not far from her birthplace, with the local Delfia Hollandia Combinatie. In 2011 she moved to the youth department of ADO Den Haag and was promoted to the first team a year later. Beerensteyn made her league debut against Heerenveen on 7 September 2012. She scored her first league goal against Utrecht on 14 December 2012, scoring in the 22nd minute. Beerensteyn scored a hattrick against PEC Zwolle on 27 February 2015. She scored a hattrick against PEC Zwolle (women)|PEC Zwolle on 6 November 2015. In four seasons - the first three in the BeNe League - she played 85 league games, scored 77 goals and won the club cup 2013 and 2016.

=== FC Twente ===
For the 2016/17 season she was signed by league rivals FC Twente. Beerensteyn made her league debut against Ajax on 2 September 2016. She scored her first league goal against PSV on 23 September 2016, scoring in the 66th minute. She played 21 league games in the Eredivisie, scoring eight goals, as well as playing three games in the season's final championship round, in which she scored one goal.

=== Bayern Munich ===
On 31 May 2017, Beerensteyn joined Bundesliga club Bayern Munich, signing a three-year contract set to be activated on 1 July. She scored on her league debut for Bayern Munich on 24 September 2017 (3rd matchday) in a 2–0 win in the Bundesliga home game against promoted team 1. FC Köln, coming on as a substitute for Jill Roord in the 62nd minute and scoring in the 90th minute.

=== Juventus ===
On 21 June 2022, Beerensteyn joined Serie A club Juventus, signing a contract until 30 June 2025. She scored on her league debut against Como on 27 August 2022, scoring in the 51st and 86th minute. With the Italian club, she qualified for the group phase of the 2022–23 UEFA Champions League, but missed the quarter-finals due to a goalless draw in the last group game against record winners Olympique Lyon. She appeared in nine games and scored two goals.

Beerensteyn left Juventus at the end of the 2023–24 season, having scored 22 goals in 66 appearances for the club.

=== Wolfsburg ===
On 17 June 2024, it was announced that Beerensteyn would join Frauen-Bundesliga club VfL Wolfsburg on a free transfer on 1 July, signing a two-year contract.

On 27 April 2026, the club announced that Beerensteyn would leave the club at the end of the season, after two seasons. She made more than 40 appearances and scored 34 goals in all competitions during her spell with the club.

=== Real Madrid ===
On 16 June 2026, Beerensteyn signed a three-year contract with Liga F club Real Madrid.

== International career ==
Beerensteyn made her national debut for the first time in 2011 and played two international matches for the Netherlands youth national team in the U-15 age group. From 2012 to 2016, further appearances followed in the U-16, U-17, and U-19 age groups. With the U-19 national team she took part in the European Championship held in Norway from 15 to 27 July 2014, which ended with her team winning the European championship title for the first time.

She made her senior national team debut on 4 June 2016 in Waalwijk, in a 1-0 friendly win against South Africa, before being substituted for Daniëlle van de Donk in the 78th minute. She scored her first senior international goal on 20 October 2016 in Livingston in a 7–0 win in the friendly against the Scottish national team with the goal to make it 2–0 in the 45th minute.

At the Euro 2017 in her home country, which ended with her team's final victory, she had two short appearances in the group games and one short appearance in the quarter-finals against Sweden. After the tournament, the whole team was honoured by the Prime Minister Mark Rutte and Minister of Sport Edith Schippers and made Knights of the Order of Orange-Nassau.

She scored a goal at the 2018 Algarve Cup against Japan on 28 February 2018, scoring in the 8th minute. The Dutch shared the title with the Swedish due to the final not being held because of a flooded pitch.

At the 2019 World Cup, she was used in all seven of the Netherlands' games, coming on as a substitute five times. Beerensteyn scored the winning goal in the third group game against Canada. In the end, the Dutch reached the final for the first time, but lost 2–0 to defending champions USA.

She was nominated for the national team squad for the 2020 Olympic football tournament that took place in Japan from 21 July to 7 August 2021, which had been postponed by a year due to the COVID-19 pandemic. She was used in the three group games, in which she scored three goals, and in the quarterfinals against world champions USA, which the Dutch lost on penalties.

She was used five times in qualifying for the 2023 World Cup and scored two goals. Beerensteyn scored against Cyprus on 8 April 2022, scoring in the 53rd minute. She scored against Belarus on 28 June 2022, scoring in the 85th minute.

On 31 May 2022 she was nominated for the Euro 2022. At the European Championships she was used in the three group games and in the quarter-finals, which was lost in extra time against France.

On 30 June 2023 she was nominated for the World Cup, played in each of her team's five games and was eliminated with her team in the quarter-finals against Spain after extra time. She scored one goal during the tournament.

== Personal life ==
Born in the Netherlands, Beerensteyn is of Surinamese descent.

== Career statistics ==
=== International ===
Scores and results list the Netherlands' goal tally first, score column indicates score after each Beerensteyn goal.

List of international goals scored by Lineth Beerensteyn
No.	Date	Venue	Opponent	Score	Result	Competition
1	20 October 2016	Tony Macaroni Arena, Livingston, Scotland	Scotland	2–0	7–0	Friendly
2	20 January 2017	Pinatar Arena, San Pedro del Pinatar, Spain	Romania	1–1	7–1	Friendly
3	24 January 2017	Pinatar Arena, San Pedro del Pinatar, Spain	Russia	3–0	4–0	Friendly
4	28 February 2018	Bela Vista Municipal Stadium, Parchal, Portugal	Japan	2–0	6–2	2018 Algarve Cup
5	10 April 2018	Tallaght Stadium, Dublin, Republic of Ireland	Republic of Ireland	1–0	2–0	2019 FIFA Women's World Cup qualification
6	8 June 2018	Shamrock Park, Portadown, Northern Ireland	Northern Ireland	1–0	5–0	2019 FIFA Women's World Cup qualification
7	5 October 2018	Rat Verlegh Stadion, Breda, Netherlands	Denmark	1–0	2–0	2019 FIFA Women's World Cup qualification
8	9 October 2018	Viborg Stadium, Viborg, Denmark	Denmark	1–0	2–0	2019 FIFA Women's World Cup qualification
9	9 October 2018	Viborg Stadium, Viborg, Denmark	Denmark	2–0	2–0	2019 FIFA Women's World Cup qualification
10	20 June 2019	Stade Auguste-Delaune, Reims, France	Canada	2–1	2–1	2019 FIFA Women's World Cup
11	4 October 2019	Mestni Stadion, Slovenia	Slovenia	2–0	4–2	UEFA Women's Euro 2022 qualifying
12	13 April 2021	De Goffert, Nijmegen, Netherlands	Australia	4–0	5–0	Friendly
13	21 July 2021	Miyagi Stadium, Rifu, Japan	Zambia	8–1	10–3	2020 Olympic Games
14	27 July 2021	Nissan Stadium, Yokohama, Japan	China	2–1	8–2	2020 Olympic Games
15	27 July 2021	Nissan Stadium, Yokohama, Japan	China	3–1	8–2	2020 Olympic Games
16	16 February 2022	Stade Michel d'Ornano, Caen, France	Brazil	1–0	1–0	2022 Tournoi de France
17	22 February 2022	Stade Michel d'Ornano, Caen, France	France	2–1	3–1	2022 Tournoi de France
18	8 April 2022	Euroborg, Groningen, Netherlands	Cyprus	6–0	12–0	2023 FIFA Women's World Cup qualification
19	12 April 2022	ADO Den Haag Stadium, The Hague, Netherlands	South Africa	2–1	5–1	Friendly
20	28 June 2022	De Grolsch Veste, Enschede, Netherlands	Belarus	3–0	3–0	2023 FIFA Women's World Cup qualification
21	15 November 2022	MAC³PARK Stadion, Zwolle, Netherlands	Denmark	2–0	2–0	Friendly
22	21 February 2023	National Stadium, Ta' Qali, Ta' Qali, Malta	Austria	1–0	4–0	Friendly
23	21 February 2023	National Stadium, Ta' Qali, Ta' Qali, Malta	Austria	3–0	4–0	Friendly
24	11 April 2023	Sparta Stadion Het Kasteel, Rotterdam, Netherlands	Poland	2–1	4–1	Friendly
25	2 July 2023	Parkstad Limburg Stadion, Kerkrade, Netherlands	Belgium	3–0	5–0	Friendly
26	6 August 2023	Sydney Football Stadium, Sydney, Australia	South Africa	2–0	2–0	2023 FIFA Women's World Cup
27	27 October 2023	Goffertstadion, Nijmegen, Netherlands	Scotland	3–0	4–0	2023–24 UEFA Women's Nations League
28	27 October 2023	Goffertstadion, Nijmegen, Netherlands	Scotland	4–0	4–0	2023–24 UEFA Women's Nations League
29	1 December 2023	Wembley Stadium, London, England	England	1–0	2–3	2023–24 UEFA Women's Nations League
30	1 December 2023	Wembley Stadium, London, England	England	2–0	2–3	2023–24 UEFA Women's Nations League
31	5 December 2023	Koning Willem II Stadion, Tilburg, Netherlands	Belgium	1–0	4–0	2023–24 UEFA Women's Nations League
32	5 December 2023	Koning Willem II Stadion, Tilburg, Netherlands	Belgium	2–0	4–0	2023–24 UEFA Women's Nations League
33	9 April 2024	Rat Verlegh Stadion, Breda, Netherlands	Norway	1–0	1–0	UEFA Women's Euro 2025 qualifying
34	31 May 2024	Sparta Stadion Het Kasteel, Rotterdam, Netherlands	Finland	1–0	1–0	UEFA Women's Euro 2025 qualifying
35	4 June 2024	Tammelan Stadion, Tampere, Finland	Finland	1–0	1–1	UEFA Women's Euro 2025 qualifying
36	29 November 2024	Sparta Stadion Het Kasteel, Rotterdam, Netherlands	China	3–1	4–1	Friendly
37	21 February 2025	Rat Verlegh Stadion, Breda, Netherlands	Germany	1–0	2–2	2025 UEFA Women's Nations League
38	21 February 2025	Rat Verlegh Stadion, Breda, Netherlands	Germany	2–2	2–2	2025 UEFA Women's Nations League
39	25 February 2025	Hampden Park, Glasgow, Scotland	Scotland	1–1	2–1	2025 UEFA Women's Nations League
40	7 March 2026	Stadion Galgenwaard, Utrecht, Netherlands	Republic of Ireland	1–0	2–1	2027 FIFA Women's World Cup qualification
41	7 March 2026	Stadion Galgenwaard, Utrecht, Netherlands	Republic of Ireland	2–1	2–1	2027 FIFA Women's World Cup qualification
42	9 October 2026	Pancho Aréna, Felcsút, Hungary	Hungary	1–0	8–0	2027 FIFA Women's World Cup qualification
43	9 October 2026	Pancho Aréna, Felcsút, Hungary	Hungary	2–0	8–0	2027 FIFA Women's World Cup qualification
44	9 October 2026	Pancho Aréna, Felcsút, Hungary	Hungary	8–0	8–0	2027 FIFA Women's World Cup qualification
45	13 October 2026	Koning Willem II Stadion, Tilburg, Netherlands	Hungary	2–0	3–0	2027 FIFA Women's World Cup qualification

== Honours ==
ADO Den Haag

- KNVB Women's Cup: 2012–13
- BeNe Super Cup runner-up: 2012–13

Bayern Munich

- Frauen-Bundesliga: 2020–21

Netherlands U19

- UEFA Women's Under-19 Championship: 2014

Netherlands

- FIFA Women's World Cup runner-up: 2019
- UEFA European Women's Championship: 2017
- Algarve Cup: 2018

Individual

- Knight of the Order of Orange-Nassau: 2017
- Artilheira da Frauen-Bundesliga: 2024–25
