= Eshly Bakker =

Dutch footballer (born 1993)

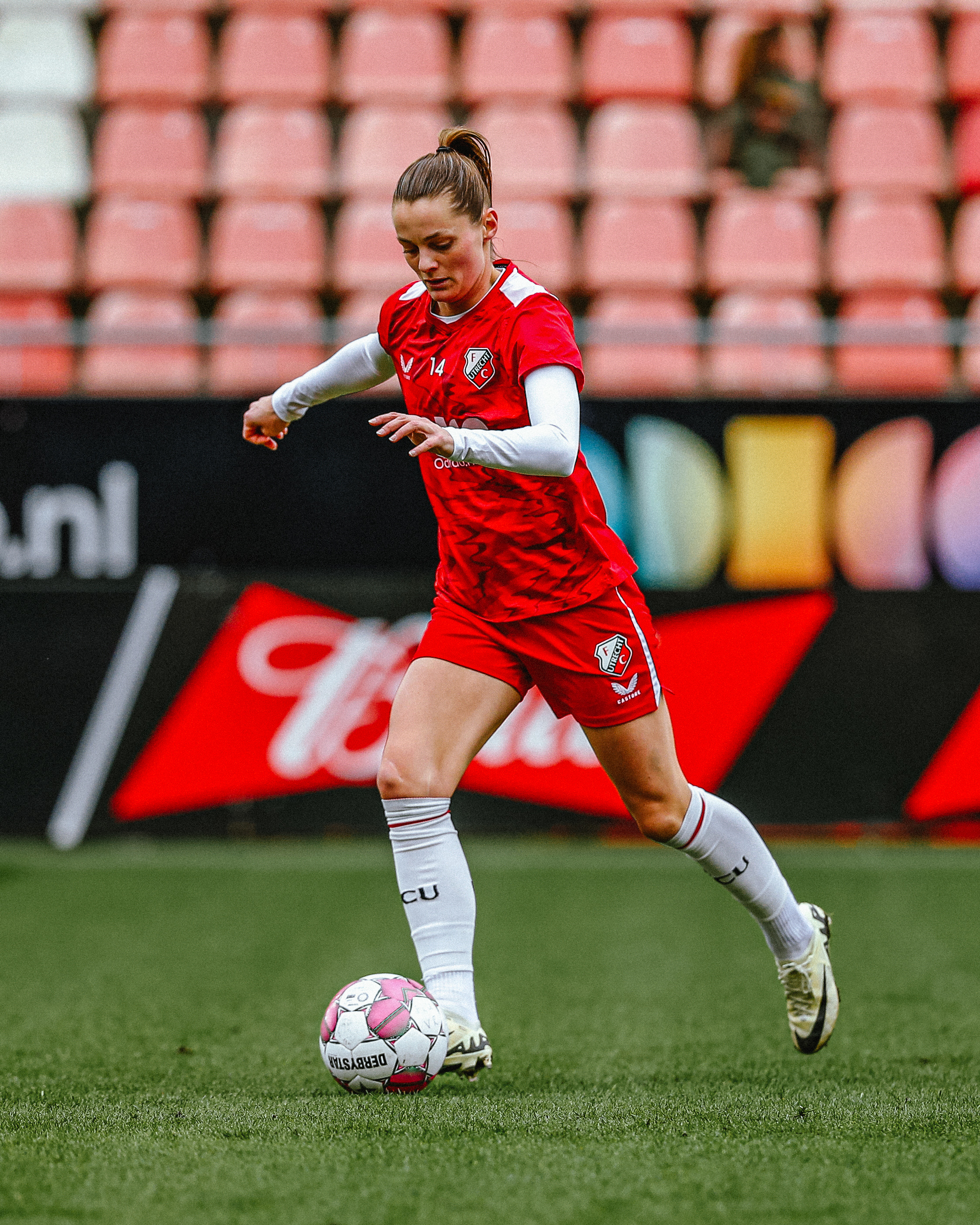
- Bakker in 2021

Personal information
- Full name: Eshly Bakker
- Date of birth: 10 February 1993 (age 33)
- Place of birth: Amsterdam, Netherlands
- Height: 1.72 m (5 ft 8 in)
- Positions: Midfielder; forward

Team information
- Current team: Linköping FC

Youth career
- RKSV Pancratius

Senior career*
Years	Team	Apps	(Gls)
2010–2012	ADO Den Haag	13	(6)
2012–2016	AFC Ajax	82	(26)
2016–2017	FC Twente	23	(8)
2017–2018	MSV Duisburg	11	(0)
2018–2023	Ajax	90	(23)
2023–2024	Utrecht	20	(9)
2024–	Linköping FC	11	(2)

International career^{‡}
2008	Netherlands U-15	2	(2)
2009	Netherlands U-16	4	(1)
2008–2010	Netherlands U-17	11	(1)
2010–2012	Netherlands U-19	8	(9)
2014–	Netherlands	14	(3)
- * Club domestic league appearances and goals as of 19:52 16 March 2025 (UTC) ‡ National team caps and goals as of 17 December 2017

Eshly Bakker (born 10 February 1993) is a Dutch footballer who plays as midfielder or forward for Linköping FC in Sweden and the Netherlands national team.

== Club career ==
=== ADO Den Haag ===
Born in Amsterdam, she started her career at amateur club RKSV Pancratius from Badhoevedorp. In 2010, aged 17 she moved to Eredivisie club ADO Den Haag. Bakker made her league debut against Willem II on 2 September 2010. She scored her first league goals against Heerenveen on 7 October 2011, scoring in the 18th and 82nd minute. She won the women's Dutch League (Eredivisie) and Cup in the 2011–12 season with ADO Den Haag at the age of 19.

=== Ajax ===
Bakker made her league debut against Heerenveen on 24 August 2012. She scored her first league goal against Beerschot AD on 26 April 2013, scoring in the 69th minute. Her second Dutch Cup title came in the 2013–14 season. Bakker scored a hattrick against Gent on 6 June 2014.

=== FC Twente ===
Bakker made her league debut against Ajax on 2 September 2016. She scored her first league goal against ADO Den Haag on 16 October 2016, scoring in the 52nd minute. Bakker scored a hattrick against PEC Zwolle on 2 December 2016.

=== MSV Duisburg ===
Bakker joined German women's Bundesliga club MSV Duisburg on 16 June 2017. She made her league debut against Freiburg on 3 September 2017. Bakker scored her first goal for the club in the DFB-Pokal Frauen against Arminia Bielefeld on 8 October 2017, scoring in the 87th minute.

=== Second spell at Ajax ===
Bakker made her league debut against PEC Zwolle on 7 September 2018. She scored her first league goal against Achilles '29 on 4 November 2018, scoring in the 58th minute. Bakker scored a hattrick against Excelsior on 14 December 2018. She won the Goal of the Month award for March 2021, for her goal against Excelsior. On 9 July 2021, it was announced that Bakker had extended her contract until 2022. She reached 200 matches played for Ajax on 30 October 2022. Bakker left Ajax in 2023, having played the most games in the history of the club.

=== Utrecht ===
Bakker was announced at Utrecht on 19 June 2023. She scored on her league debut against Feyenoord on 10 September 2023. On 10 March 2024, during a match against Ajax, Bakker's twin held up a banner asking Eshly to be a witness at their wedding, which brought Bakker to tears. She led the team with 10 goals on the season.

=== Linköping FC ===
On August 16, 2024, Bakker made a transfer to Swedish team Linköping FC. The move was the first time FC Utrecht received a transfer fee.

== International career ==
Bakker progressed through the national youth teams, where she played for the under-15, under-16, under-17 (including the 2010 UEFA Women's Under-17 Championship) and under-19.

She made her debut for the Netherlands senior national team on 5 April 2014, in a 2015 FIFA Women's World Cup qualification match against Greece, coming on as a substitute and scoring the last goal of the 6–0 win.

=== International goals ===
Scores and results list the Netherlands goal tally first.

Goal	Date	Venue	Opponent	Score	Result	Competition
1.	5 April 2014	Pankritio Stadium, Heraklion, Greece	Greece	6–0	6–0	2015 FIFA Women's World Cup qualification
2.	10 April 2014	Stadion De Braak, Helmond, Netherlands	Albania	9–1	10–1	2015 FIFA Women's World Cup qualification
3.	7 February 2015	Polman Stadion, Almelo, Netherlands	Thailand	3–0	7–0	Friendly

== Honours ==
ADO Den Haag

- Eredivisie (1): 2011–12
- KNVB Women's Cup (1): 2011–12

Ajax

- KNVB Women's Cup (3): 2013–14, 2018–19, 2021–22,
