= Elze Huls =

Dutch footballer

Personal information
- Date of birth: 14 October 1995 (age 31)
- Position: Midfielder

Senior career*
Years	Team	Apps	(Gls)
2015–2022	SC Heerenveen	68	(3)
2022–2023	SGS Essen	0	(0)

International career
2013–2014	Netherlands U19	4	(2)
- * Club domestic league appearances and goals as of 23:25, 5 June 2024

Elze Huls (October 14, 1995) is a Dutch footballer.

== Career ==
=== SC Heerenveen ===
Huls made her league debut against Ajax on 21 August 2015. She scored her first league goal against PEC Zwolle on 28 April 2017, scoring in the 57th minute.

=== SGS Essen ===
On 30 April 2022, it was announced that Huls had joined SGS Essen. However, due to a persistent ankle injury, she didn't make an appearance during the 2022–23 season. On 15 August 2023, Huls announced that she had terminated her contract with SGS Essen.

== Football development ==
It is unclear if Huls has retired, but as of September 2023 she is working with the KNVB as a Project Officer Football Development.
