= Wiëlle Douma =

Dutch footballer

Personal information
- Date of birth: 13 January 2000 (age 26)
- Place of birth: Netherlands
- Position: Defender

Team information
- Current team: TSG Hoffenheim
- Number: 13

Youth career
- -2015: FC Wolvega
- Heerenveen

Senior career*
Years	Team	Apps	(Gls)
2015–2021	Heerenveen	90	(2)
2021–2024	ADO Den Haag	48	(1)
2024-2025	YB Frauen	21	(2)
2025-	TSG Hoffenheim	18	(1)
- * Club domestic league appearances and goals as of 24 May 2026

Wiëlle Douma (born 13 January 2000) is a Dutch footballer who plays as defender for TSG Hoffenheim in the Frauen-Bundesliga.

== Career ==
She grew up in Friesland and played with the FC Wolvega and Heerenveen youth teams, before playing for SC Heerenveen Vrouwen for six seasons.

At the age of fifteen she suffered a severe concussion in a match with the Heerenveen youth team. Recovery took one year, during which playing football was one of the few things that did not cause headaches. Remarkably, she made her debut for the first team during this period (PEC Zwolle - Heerenveen, 11 December 2015). She has been playing with a protective headband ever since. Douma scored her first league goal against Achilles '29 on 19 March 2019, scoring in the 38th minute.

She transferred to ADO Den Haag in 2021. Douma made her league debut against Feyenoord on 29 August 2021. She scored her first league goal against Excelsior on 10 October 2021, scoring in the 58th minute. On 2 August 2022, Douma signed a new contract.

== Playing style ==
Douma is able to play in both the left- and right-back positions.
