= Ellen Jansen =

Dutch footballer

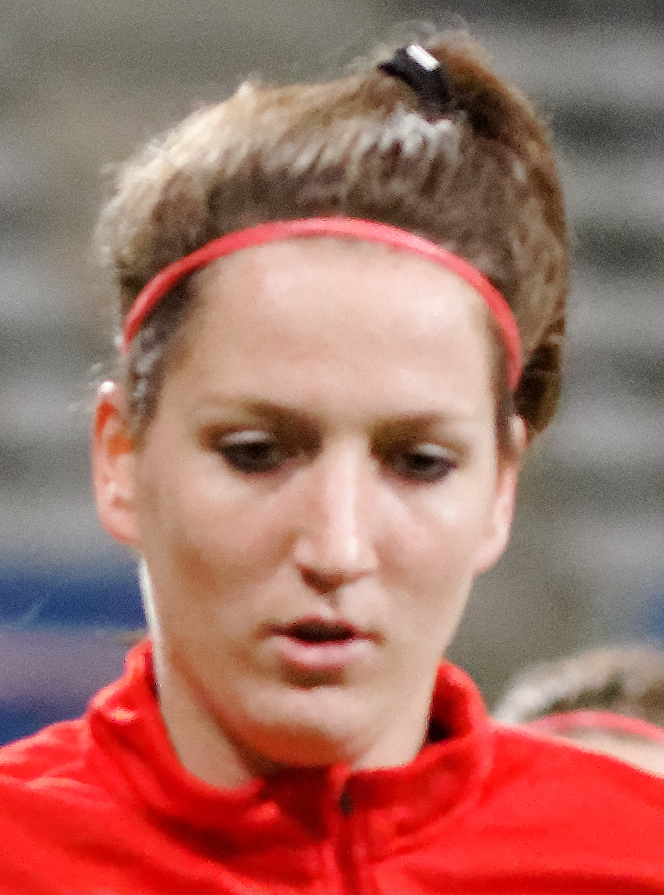
- Jansen with Twente in 2014

Personal information
- Date of birth: 6 October 1992 (age 34)
- Place of birth: Markelo, Netherlands
- Height: 1.78 m (5 ft 10 in)
- Position: Forward

Team information
- Current team: Valencia
- Number: 17

Senior career*
Years	Team	Apps	(Gls)
2008–2018	FC Twente	151	(94)
2018–2020	Ajax	35	(15)
2020–	Valencia	57	(10)

International career
2007	Netherlands U15	2	(2)
2008–2009	Netherlands U17	9	(2)
2009–2011	Netherlands U19	27	(18)
2010–2019	Netherlands	16	(2)
Medal record
Women's football
Representing the Netherlands
FIFA Women's World Cup
Silver medal – second place	2019 France
- * Club domestic league appearances and goals as of 13:52, 6 June 2024 (UTC)

Ellen Jansen (born 6 October 1992) is a Dutch former professional footballer. She last played as a forward for Spanish Primera División club Valencia CF and the Netherlands women's national team. Jansen was seen as a talented player during her playing days.

== Club career ==
=== Twente ===
Jansen scored a hattrick against Beerschot on 19 April 2013.

On 17 December 2013, it was announced that Jansen, along with eight other players, had extended their contracts.

She scored a hattrick against Royal Antwerp on 15 November 2013. Jansen scored a hattrick against K.A.A Gent on 13 December 2013. She scored another hattrick against Gent on 30 May 2014.

Jansen scored her 100th goal against Achilles '29 in January 2017, also scoring a hattrick in the same game. She played her 200th league match against PEC Zwolle.

During her time at Twente, she was seen as a 'goal machine'.

=== Ajax ===
On 24 May 2018, it was announced that Jansen had joined Ajax. She scored on her league debut against PEC Zwolle on 7 September 2018, scoring a brace in the 16th and 34th minute.

=== Valencia ===
On 15 July 2020, it was announced that Jansen had joined Valencia. She made her league debut against Sporting de Huelva on 4 October 2020. Jansen scored her first league goal against UD Tenerife on 18 October 2020, scoring in the 21st minute.

On 1 July 2022, it was announced that Jansen had retired to focus on her social career.

== International career ==
On 12 December 2010, she made her debut for the Dutch national team, in the 2010 International Women's Football Tournament of City of São Paulo match against Brazil.

In October 2016, Jansen was called up to the national squad. She scored her first international goal against Scotland on 20 October 2016, scoring in the 72nd minute.

She was selected for friendly matches in June 2017.

On 20 February 2018, it was announced that Jansen had been called up to the Algarve Cup.

=== International goals ===
Scores and results list the Netherlands goal tally first.

Goal	Date	Venue	Opponent	Score	Result	Competition
1.	20 October 2016	Tony Macaroni Arena, Livingston, Scotland	Scotland	5–0	7–0	Friendly
2.	30 August 2019	A. Le Coq Arena, Tallinn, Estonia	Estonia	7–0	7–0	UEFA Women's Euro 2021 qualifying

== Honours ==
FC Twente

- Eredivisie: 2010–11, 2015–16
- BeNe League: 2012–13, 2013–14
- KNVB Women's Cup: 2014–15

Netherlands

- FIFA Women's World Cup runner-up: 2019
- Algarve Cup: 2018
