= Katja Snoeijs =

Dutch footballer (born 1996)

Personal information
- Date of birth: 31 August 1996 (age 30)
- Place of birth: Amsterdam, Netherlands
- Height: 1.73 m (5 ft 8 in)
- Position: Striker

Team information
- Current team: Ajax
- Number: 9

Youth career
- Fortuna Wormerveer

Senior career*
Years	Team	Apps	(Gls)
2015–2017	SC Telstar	45	(28)
2017–2018	VV Alkmaar	25	(25)
2018–2020	PSV	36	(33)
2020–2022	Bordeaux	42	(19)
2022–2026	Everton	75	(16)
2026–	Ajax	9	(5)

International career^{‡}
2019	Netherlands U23	2	(2)
2019–	Netherlands	38	(12)
- * Club domestic league appearances and goals as of 1 November 2026 ‡ National team caps and goals as of 3 June 2025

Katja Snoeijs (Dutch: [ˈkɑtɕaː ˈsnujs]; born 31 August 1996) is a Dutch professional footballer who plays as a striker for Vrouwen Eredivisie club Ajax and the Netherlands national team.

== Club career ==
=== SC Telstar and VV Alkmaar ===
A youth academy product of Fortuna Wormerveer, Snoeijs made her senior club debut with SC Telstar on 28 August 2015 in a 6–0 loss to Twente. She scored her first goal on 7 November 2015 in a 4–1 defeat against Ajax. After finishing as the league's top scorer for two consecutive seasons, Snoeijs joined PSV in July 2018.

=== PSV ===
During the 2018–19 season, Snoeijs scored 20 goals in 24 matches for PSV, leading the club to a first-place finish. Her first goals for the team were a brace against her former team VV Alkmaar, lifting PSV to a 5–0 win. A week later, she scored another brace in a 5–0 win against SC Heerenveen. Snoeijs was in goals in the Eredivisie, just one goal behind Joëlle Smits of Twente.

During the 2019–20 season, Snoeijs scored 13 goals in 12 matches before the season was suspended due to the COVID-19 pandemic. Snoeijs' 13 goals ranked second in the league.

=== Bordeaux ===
On 22 June 2020, French club Bordeaux signed Snoeijs on a two-year contract. She debuted for the club on 2 August 2020 against Paris Saint-Germain (PSG) in the semi-final of 2019–2020 Coupe de France. She scored a goal in the first half, but PSG answered with two goals in second half, thus advancing to the tournament final.

=== Everton ===
On 18 July 2022, Snoeijs joined English club Everton on a deal lasting until June 2024. She scored her first goal for the club in the 8th minute of the 3–0 victory over Tottenham on 14 December 2022. She scored a brace in the 3–0 victory over Aston Villa in the 2023–24 FA Cup.

Snoeijs signed a two-year contract extension with Everton on 25 May 2024. On 26 June 2026, it was announced that she would leave Everton when her contract expired.

=== Ajax ===
On 1 July 2026, Snoeijs joined Ajax on a three-year contract.

== International career ==
Snoeijs has represented Netherlands at youth level. On 28 May 2019, she scored the first ever goal in the history of the Netherlands under-23 team.

After several call-ups, Snoeijs made her senior team debut on 8 November 2019 in an 8–0 win against Turkey. She scored her first goal on 23 October 2020 in a 7–0 win over Estonia. She scored her first international hat-trick on 27 October 2020 in a 6–0 win over Kosovo in a Euro 2022 qualifying game. On 1 December 2020, she scored her second international hat-trick, again in a 6–0 win over Kosovo.

On 31 May 2023, Snoeijs was named in the provisional squad for the 2023 FIFA Women's World Cup. She scored one goal in the tournament against Vietnam. Netherlands advanced to the quarter-finals before being knocked out in overtime by eventual champions Spain.

In June 2025, Snoeijs was called up for the UEFA Women's Euro 2025.

== Personal life ==
Snoeijs was born with a hole in her heart and underwent major heart surgery at the age of three. She had her left leg operated on at the age of 12 after it had grown to be 6 centimeters longer than her right leg due to an unknown cause. After having to be substituted off during a game against West Ham United in the 2024–25 season because of cramping pains she was diagnosed with endometriosis, and has spoken about the diagnosis to destigmatize and raise awareness of the issue.

== Career statistics ==
=== Club ===
As of match played 16 May 2026

Appearances and goals by club, season and competition
Club	Season	League			National cup (Note: Includes KNVB Women's Cup, Coupe de France, Women's FA Cup)		League cup (Note: Includes Eredivisie Cup, Women's League Cup)		Continental		Total	
Club	Season	Division	Apps	Goals	Apps	Goals	Apps	Goals	Apps	Goals	Apps	Goals
SC Telstar	2015–16	Vrouwen Eredivisie	21	7	?	?	—		—		21	7
SC Telstar	2016–17	Vrouwen Eredivisie	24	21	?	?	—		—		24	21
VV Alkmaar	2017–18	Vrouwen Eredivisie	25	25	?	?	—		—		25	25
VV Alkmaar	Total		70	53	0	0	0	0	0	0	70	53
PSV	2018–19	Vrouwen Eredivisie	24	20	?	?	—		—		24	20
PSV	2019–20	Vrouwen Eredivisie	12	13	?	?	?	?	—		12	13
PSV	Total		36	33	0	0	0	0	0	0	36	33
Bordeaux	2019–20	D1 Féminine	—		1	1	—		—		1	1
Bordeaux	2020–21	D1 Féminine	21	9	1	2	—		—		22	11
Bordeaux	2021–22	D1 Féminine	21	10	1	0	—		4 (Note: appearance(s) in UEFA Women's Champions League)	3	26	13
Bordeaux	Total		42	19	3	3	0	0	4	3	49	25
Everton	2022–23	Women's Super League	21	7	1	0	2	1	—		24	8
Everton	2023–24	Women's Super League	19	3	3	2	0	0	—		22	5
Everton	2024–25	Women's Super League	22	4	2	0	1	0	—		25	4
Everton	2025–26	Women's Super League	13	2	0	0	1	1	—		14	3
Everton	Total		75	16	6	2	4	2	0	0	85	20
Career total			223	121	9	5	4	2	4	3	240	131

=== International ===
As of match played 3 June 2025

Appearances and goals by national team and year
National team	Year	Apps	Goals
Netherlands	2019	1	0
Netherlands	2020	5	7
Netherlands	2021	5	0
Netherlands	2022	3	2
Netherlands	2023	10	2
Netherlands	2024	10	1
Netherlands	2025	4	0
Total		38	12

Scores and results list Netherlands' goal tally first, score column indicates score after each Snoeijs goal.

List of international goals scored by Katja Snoeijs
No.	Date	Venue	Opponent	Score	Result	Competition
1	23 October 2020	Euroborg, Groningen, Netherlands	Estonia	7–0	7–0	2022 UEFA Women's Euro qualification
2	27 October 2020	Fadil Vokrri Stadium, Pristina, Kosovo	Kosovo	2–0	6–0	2022 UEFA Women's Euro qualification
3	27 October 2020	Fadil Vokrri Stadium, Pristina, Kosovo	Kosovo	4–0	6–0	2022 UEFA Women's Euro qualification
4	27 October 2020	Fadil Vokrri Stadium, Pristina, Kosovo	Kosovo	6–0	6–0	2022 UEFA Women's Euro qualification
5	1 December 2020	Rat Verlegh Stadion, Breda, Netherlands	Kosovo	1–0	6–0	2022 UEFA Women's Euro qualification
6	1 December 2020	Rat Verlegh Stadion, Breda, Netherlands	Kosovo	4–0	6–0	2022 UEFA Women's Euro qualification
7	1 December 2020	Rat Verlegh Stadion, Breda, Netherlands	Kosovo	6–0	6–0	2022 UEFA Women's Euro qualification
8	19 February 2022	Stade Océane, Le Havre, France	Finland	2–0	3–0	2022 Tournoi de France
9	19 February 2022	Stade Océane, Le Havre, France	Finland	3–0	3–0	2022 Tournoi de France
10	2 July 2023	Parkstad Limburg Stadion, Kerkrade, Netherlands	Belgium	5–0	5–0	Friendly
11	1 August 2023	Forsyth Barr Stadium, Dunedin, New Zealand	Vietnam	2–0	7–0	2023 FIFA Women's World Cup
12	25 October 2024	De Vijverberg, Doetinchem, Netherlands	Indonesia	14–0	15–0	Friendly

== Honours ==
Individual

- Vrouwen Eredivisie top goalscorer: 2016–17, 2017–18
