= Marjolijn van den Bighelaar =

Dutch association footballer

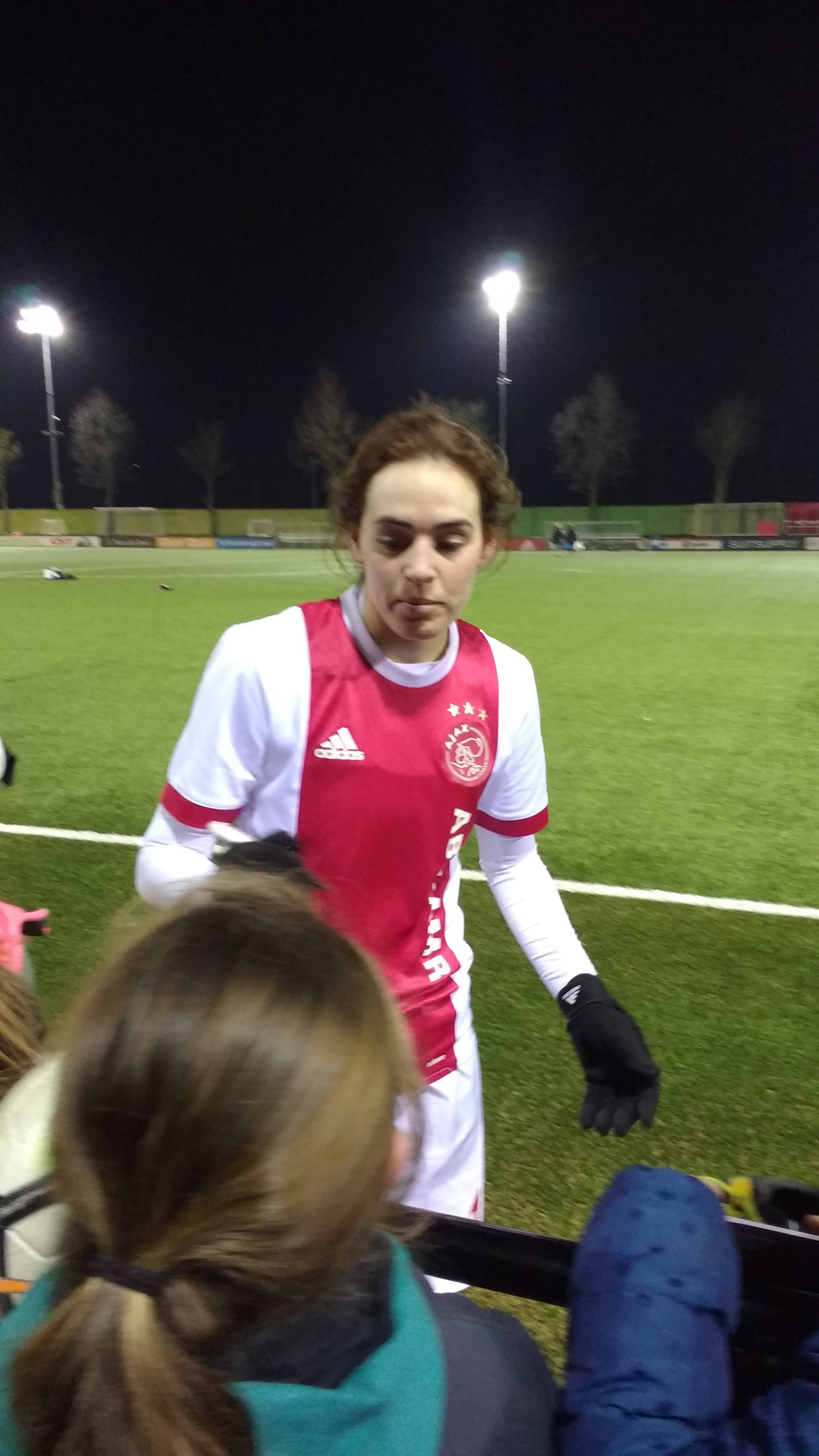

Personal information
- Date of birth: 28 November 1990 (age 35)
- Place of birth: Velddriel, Netherlands
- Position: Forward

Senior career*
Years	Team	Apps	(Gls)
2009–2011	Willem II	38	(6)
2011–2012	ADO Den Haag	15	(3)
2012–2013	PSV	14	(2)
2013–2022	Ajax	151	(61)
Total		218	(72)

International career
2006	Netherlands U17	1	(0)
- * Club domestic league appearances and goals

Marjolijn van den Bighelaar (born 28 November 1990) is a Dutch former footballer who played as a forward.

== Club career ==
=== Willem II ===
Van den Bighelaar made her league debut against FC Utrecht on 1 October 2009. She scored her first goal against ADO Den Haag on 30 November 2009, scoring in the 58th minute.

=== ADO Den Haag ===
Van den Bighelaar scored on her league debut against PEC Zwolle on 2 September 2011, scoring in the 74th minute.

=== PSV ===
Van den Bighelaar scored on her league debut against ADO Den Haag on 24 August 2012, scoring in the 53rd and 55th minute.

=== Ajax ===
Van den Bighelaar made her league debut against OH Leuven on 3 September 2013. She scored her first league goal against Alkmaar on 13 September 2013, scoring in the 89th minute. Van den Bighelaar scored a hattrick against PEC Zwolle on 29 November 2019. She announced her retirement on 17 November 2022, retiring as Ajax's all-time top scorer. In 2024, Romée Leuchter became Ajax's all-time top scorer after passing Van den Bighelaar's 79 goal record with 81 goals.

== International career ==
Van den Bighelaar was a notable absentee from Sarina Wiegman's Euro 2017 squad.

== Coaching career ==
On 25 January 2023, it was announced that van den Bighelaar would become the Coordinator of the Women's Football Academy at FC Utrecht.

== Personal life ==
Van den Bighelaar has one daughter.
