= 2022 Tournoi de France =

Second edition of the Women Tournoi de France

Tournament details
- Host country: France
- Dates: 16–22 February
- Teams: 4 (from 2 confederations)
- Venues: 2 (in 2 host cities)

Final positions
- Champions: France (2nd title)
- Runners-up: Netherlands
- Third place: Brazil
- Fourth place: Finland

Tournament statistics
- Matches played: 6
- Goals scored: 17 (2.83 per match)
- Top scorer(s): (France) Marie-Antoinette Katoto (4 goals)

The 2022 Tournoi de France was the second edition of the Tournoi de France, an invitational women's football tournament held annually in France. It took place from 16 to 22 February 2022.

== Teams ==
Four teams participated.

Team	FIFA Rankings (December 2021)
France	4
Netherlands	5
Brazil	7
Finland	28

== Standings ==
Pos	Team	Pld	W	D	L	GF	GA	GD	Pts
1st place, gold medalist(s)	France (H)	3	3	0	0	10	2	+8	9
2nd place, silver medalist(s)	Netherlands	3	1	1	1	5	4	+1	4
3rd place, bronze medalist(s)	Brazil	3	0	2	1	2	3	−1	2
4	Finland	3	0	1	2	0	8	−8	1

Source: Soccerway
Rules for classification: 1) points; 2) goal difference; 3) goals scored; 4) head-to-head result; 5) fair play ranking.
(H) Hosts

== Results ==
All times are local (UTC+1).

16 February 2022
19:00

Brazil	1–1	Netherlands
Marta 87' (pen.)	Report	Beerensteyn 62'

Stade Michel d'Ornano, Caen
Attendance: 1,182
Referee: Stéphanie Frappart (France)
16 February 2022
21:10

France	5–0	Finland
Westerlund 12' (o.g.); Malard 16'; Renard 34', 89'; Geyoro 57'	Report

Stade Océane, Le Havre
Attendance: 3,631
Referee: Eszter Urbán (Hungary)

19 February 2022
18:00

Finland	0–3	Netherlands
	Report	Dijkstra 24'; Snoeijs 36', 49'

Stade Océane, Le Havre
Referee: Sandra Braz (Portugal)
19 February 2022
21:10

France	2–1	Brazil
Katoto 23', 59'	Report	Marta 19' (pen.)

Stade Michel d'Ornano, Caen
Attendance: 12,050
Referee: Esther Staubli (Switzerland)

22 February 2022
18:30

Brazil	0–0	Finland
	Report

Stade Michel d'Ornano, Caen
Referee: Victoria Beyer (France)
22 February 2022
21:10

France	3–1	Netherlands
Renard 20' (pen.); Katoto 25', 74'	Report	Beerensteyn 50'

Stade Océane, Le Havre
Attendance: 5,231
Referee: Marta Huerta de Aza (Spain)

== Goalscorers ==
There were 17 goals scored in 6 matches, for an average of 2.83 goals per match.

4 goals

- (France) Marie-Antoinette Katoto

3 goals

- (France) Wendie Renard

2 goals

- (Brazil) Marta
- (Netherlands) Lineth Beerensteyn
- (Netherlands) Katja Snoeijs

1 goal

- (France) Grace Geyoro
- (France) Melvine Malard
- (Netherlands) Caitlin Dijkstra

1 own goal

- (Finland) Anna Westerlund (against France)
