= Babiche Roof =

Dutch footballer (born 1993)

Personal information
- Full name: Babiche Roof
- Date of birth: 2 June 1993 (age 33)
- Place of birth: Netherlands
- Position: Midfielder

Youth career
- SC 't Gooi

Senior career*
Years	Team	Apps	(Gls)
2010–2012	Utrecht	24	(4)
2012–2014	Ajax	38	(9)
2014–2017	Telstar	71	(27)
2017–2019	PEC Zwolle	47	(34)
Total		180	(74)

International career
2011–2012	Netherlands U19	9	(0)
- * Club domestic league appearances and goals

Babiche Roof (born 2 June 1993) is a Dutch former footballer who played as a midfielder.

== Career ==
=== Utrecht ===
Roof made her league debut against VVV-Venlo on 4 November 2010. She scored her first league goal against PEC Zwolle on 23 March 2011, scoring in the 82nd minute.

=== Ajax ===
Roof scored on her league debut against Heerenveen on 24 August 2012, scoring in the 51st minute.

=== Alkmaar ===
Roof scored on her league debut against Club Brugge on 29 August 2014, scoring in the 78th minute. She scored a hattrick against Heerenveen on 26 May 2017.

=== PEC Zwolle ===
Roof made her league debut against Twente on 1 September 2017. She scored her first league goal against ADO Den Haag on 8 September 2017, scoring in the 70th minute. Roof scored a hattrick against Achilles '29 on 21 December 2018.

Roof won the Eredivise Player of the Year award in 2018.

Roof retired at the end of the 2019 season.

== Style of play ==
Roof usually played as a left winger, though was also utilized as a left half.

== Honours ==
Ajax

Winner

- KNVB Women's Cup: 2013–2014
