= 2017–18 Eredivisie (women) =

Eredivisie Vrouwen
- Season: 2017–18
- Dates: 1 September 2017 – 25 May 2018
- Champions: Ajax (2nd title)
- Champions League: Ajax
- Matches: 110
- Goals: 415 (3.77 per match)
- Top goalscorer: Katja Snoeijs (25 goals)
- Biggest home win: Twente 7-0 Achilles '29
- Biggest away win: Excelsior/Barendrecht 0-7 PSV Eindhoven
- Highest scoring: Alkmaar 1-7 PEC Zwolle; PSV Eindhoven 2-6 Ajax

The 2017–18 Eredivisie Vrouwen was the eighth season of the Netherlands women's professional football league. The season took place from 1 September 2017 to 25 May 2018 with nine teams. Ajax successfully defended its league title by going undefeated in the championship play-off after finishing second in the regular season behind FC Twente.

== Teams ==
Location of teams in the Eredivisie 2017–18

On 1 March 2017, Telstar announced it was being replaced in the league by new club VV Alkmaar. On 10 April 2017, Excelsior Barendrecht became the ninth team in the league. On 21 April 2017, VV Alkmaar was officially formed.

Team	City / Town	Venue(s)	Capacity
Achilles '29	Groesbeek	Sportpark De Heikant	4,500
ADO Den Haag	The Hague	Cars Jeans Stadion	15,000
ADO Den Haag	The Hague	Sportpark Nieuw Hanenburg	1,500
AFC Ajax	Amsterdam	Sportpark De Toekomst	2,000
VV Alkmaar	Alkmaar	Rabobank IJmond Stadion (Velsen)	3,625
VV Alkmaar	Alkmaar	Sportpark De Wending (Heerhugowaard)	1,000
VV Alkmaar	Alkmaar	AFAS Trainingscomplex (Wormerland)	1,000
Excelsior/Barendrecht	Rotterdam	Van Donge & De Roo Stadion	4,500
Excelsior/Barendrecht	Rotterdam	Sportpark De Bongerd (Barendrecht)	2,100
SC Heerenveen	Heerenveen	Sportpark Skoatterwâld	3,000
SC Heerenveen	Heerenveen	Zuidersportpark (Sneek)	3,150
PSV Eindhoven	Eindhoven	Jan Louwers Stadion	4,600
PSV Eindhoven	Eindhoven	Sportcomplex De Herdgang	2,500
FC Twente	Enschede	De Grolsch Veste	30,205
FC Twente	Enschede	Sportpark Slangenbeek (Hengelo)	2,000
FC Twente	Enschede	FC Twente-trainingscentrum (Hengelo)	1,000
PEC Zwolle	Zwolle	MAC³PARK Stadion	12,500
PEC Zwolle	Zwolle	Sportpark Ceintuurbaan	3,000

Source: Soccerway

== Format ==
The league had a split-season format. In the regular season, the nine teams played one another twice, once at home and once away, for a total of 16 matches each. After that, the top five teams qualified for a championship play-offs and the bottom four teams for the placement group. Championship play-off teams played each twice, for a total of 8 matches each, while placement group teams played each other three times, for a total of 9 matches each. Points earned in the regular season were halved and added to the points of the play-off stage rounds. There was no relegation nor promotion in the league, and the champion qualified to the 2018–19 UEFA Women's Champions League.

== Regular season ==
=== Standings ===
Pos	Team	Pld	W	D	L	GF	GA	GD	Pts	Qualification or relegation
1	Twente	16	12	3	1	46	11	+35	39	Qualification to Championship play-off
2	Ajax	16	10	5	1	32	14	+18	35	Qualification to Championship play-off
3	PEC Zwolle	16	7	3	6	34	26	+8	24	Qualification to Championship play-off
4	Heerenveen	16	7	3	6	28	26	+2	24	Qualification to Championship play-off
5	PSV	16	6	4	6	30	18	+12	22	Qualification to Championship play-off
6	ADO Den Haag	16	6	4	6	24	25	−1	22	Qualification to Placement play-off
7	Alkmaar	16	6	2	8	28	32	−4	20	Qualification to Placement play-off
8	Achilles '29	16	4	4	8	17	38	−21	16	Qualification to Placement play-off
9	Excelsior/Barendrecht	16	0	0	16	7	56	−49	0	Qualification to Placement play-off

Source: Soccerway
Rules for classification: Season in progress: 1) Points; 2) Less loss points; 3) Goal difference; 4) Goals scored; 5) Alphabetical order; End of season: 1) Points; 2) Goal difference; 3) Goals scored; 4) Head-to-head points; 5) Head-to-head goal difference; 6) Head-to-head away goals scored; 7) Play-off if relevant for deciding champion, relegation or participating in a European league, otherwise by draw. 8) Penalty shoot-out (only after a play-off)

=== Results ===
Home \ Away	ACH	ADO	AJA	ALK	EXC	HEE	PEC	PSV	TWE
Achilles '29		1–0	0–3	0–1	4–2	3–3	1–1	1–1	0–6
ADO Den Haag	2–2		2–2	2–1	3–1	1–3	2–2	2–1	0–1
Ajax	2–0	0–0		3–0	2–0	2–1	5–2	0–3	1–1
Alkmaar	3–0	4–3	0–2		4–0	2–3	1–7	1–1	2–5
Excelsior/Barendrecht	0–2	1–3	0–2	1–4		0–3	1–5	0–7	0–6
Heerenveen	3–0	1–3	1–3	0–2	2–0		2–1	1–4	1–2
PEC Zwolle	3–1	0–1	2–2	2–1	2–0	1–2		3–1	0–3
PSV	1–2	3–0	1–2	1–1	2–0	1–1	1–2		1–0
Twente	7–0	2–0	1–1	2–1	5–1	1–1	2–1	2–1	

Source: Soccerway
Legend: Blue = home team win; Yellow = draw; Red = away team win.

== Play-offs ==
=== Championship ===
The top five were set after matchday 16. Points of the first stage were halved.

==== Standings ====
Pos	Team	Pld	W	D	L	GF	GA	GD	SP	Pts	Qualification or relegation
1	Ajax (C)	8	6	2	0	25	10	+15	18	38	2018–19 UEFA Women's Champions League
2	Twente	8	5	0	3	24	19	+5	20	35	
3	Heerenveen	8	2	2	4	16	19	−3	12	20	
4	PEC Zwolle	8	2	2	4	14	22	−8	12	20	
5	PSV	8	1	2	5	18	27	−9	11	16	

Source: Soccerway
Rules for classification: Season in progress: 1) Most points won; 2) Less points lost; 3) Goal difference; 4) Goals scored; 5) Alphabetical order; End of season: 1) Points; 2) Goal difference; 3) Goals scored; 4) Head-to-head points; 5) Head-to-head goal difference; 6) Head-to-head away goals scored; 7) Play-off if relevant for deciding champion, relegation or participating in a European league, otherwise by draw. 8) Penalty shoot-out (only after a play-off)
(C) Champions

==== Results ====
Home \ Away	AJA	HEE	PEC	PSV	TWE
Ajax		3–0	3–1	2–2	3–2
Heerenveen	2–2		3–0	1–4	3–4
PEC Zwolle	0–4	2–2		3–3	3–5
PSV	2–6	2–4	1–2		2–4
Twente	1–2	2–1	1–3	5–2	

Source: Soccerway
Legend: Blue = home team win; Yellow = draw; Red = away team win.

=== Placement ===
The bottom four were set after matchday 16. Points of the first stage were halved.

==== Standings ====
Pos	Team	Pld	W	D	L	GF	GA	GD	SP	Pts
1	ADO Den Haag	9	6	2	1	24	11	+13	11	31
2	Alkmaar	9	4	2	3	19	22	−3	10	24
3	Achilles '29	9	3	2	4	15	18	−3	8	19
4	Excelsior/Barendrecht	9	1	2	6	14	21	−7	0	5

Source: Soccerway
Rules for classification: Season in progress: 1) Most points won; 2) Less points lost; 3) Goal difference; 4) Goals scored; 5) Alphabetical order; End of season: 1) Points; 2) Goal difference; 3) Goals scored; 4) Head-to-head points; 5) Head-to-head goal difference; 6) Head-to-head away goals scored; 7) Play-off if relevant for deciding champion, relegation or participating in a European league, otherwise by draw. 8) Penalty shoot-out (only after a play-off)

==== Results ====
===== 1st and 2nd third =====
Home \ Away	ACH	ADO	ALK	EXC
Achilles '29		1–4	2–1	2–1
ADO Den Haag	2–2		4–0	3–1
Alkmaar	4–2	3–3		0–5
Excelsior/Barendrecht	0–2	0–3	2–2	

Source: Soccerway
Legend: Blue = home team win; Yellow = draw; Red = away team win.

===== 3rd third =====
Home \ Away	ACH	ADO	ALK	EXC
Achilles '29			1–2	2–2
ADO Den Haag	2–1			
Alkmaar		2–1		5–2
Excelsior/Barendrecht		1–2		

Source: Soccerway
Legend: Blue = home team win; Yellow = draw; Red = away team win.
