= Achilles '29 (women) =

Defunct Dutch women's football (soccer) club

Coordinates: 51°46′56″N 5°56′56″E

Achilles '29 Vrouwen
- Full name: Rooms-Katholieke Sport Vereniging Achilles '29
- Nickname: De Witzwarten (The White-blacks)
- Founded: 2015
- Dissolved: 2019
- Ground: Sportpark De Heikant, Groesbeek
- Capacity: 4,506
- League: Eredivisie
- 2018–19: 9th
Home colours	Away colours

Achilles '29 Vrouwen was a Dutch women's football club from Groesbeek, Netherlands. The club competed in the Eredivisie for three seasons, from 2016 to 2019.

The amateur team is called Achilles '29 Dames and pre-dates the professional team (Achilles '29 Vrouwen) which was established in 2015.

In April 2019, the club announced it would discontinue the top flight women's team after the season ended due to financial difficulties from their seventh-tier men's team. The on-field performance was poor, with the team finishing in second-to-last or last place in all three seasons.

== Results ==
7	8	9
17	18	19
Vrouwen Eredivisie

Season	Division	Position	W – D – L = Pts	GF – GA	Top scorer	KNVB Cup
2016–17	Eredivisie	7 / 8	7 – 1 – 19 = 22	29 – 84	Theunissen (6)	Quarterfinals
2017–18	Eredivisie	8 / 9	7 – 6 – 12 = 27	32 – 56	Theunissen (12)	Quarterfinals
2018–19	Eredivisie	9 / 9	2 – 1 – 22 = 4	10 – 82	Cobussen (8)	Quarterfinals

== Final squad ==
As of 04 August 2019.

Note: Flags indicate national team as defined under FIFA eligibility rules; some limited exceptions apply. Players may hold more than one non-FIFA nationality.

No.	Pos.	Nation	Player
—	GK	NED	Manon Bosch
—	GK	NED	Renate Verhoeven
—	DF	NED	Michelle van der Laan
—	DF	NED	Demi ter Maat
—	DF	NED	Amber Mutsaers
—	DF	NED	Beau Rijks
—	MF	NED	Melanie Bross

No.	Pos.	Nation	Player
—	MF	NED	Yvette Derks
—	MF	NED	Guusje Eijkmans
—	MF	NED	Margaritha de Groot
—	MF	NED	Nena Hopmans
—	MF	NED	Jody Schellekens
—	MF	NED	Shirin Timmermann
—	FW	NED	Joy Kersten

== Head coaches ==
- Judith Thijssen (2015–2017)
- Robert de Pauw (2017–2018)
- Marck Cieraad (2018–2019)
