= PEC Zwolle (women) =

Dutch football (soccer club) based in Zwolle

Coordinates: 52°31′1.85″N 6°7′15.13″E

PEC Zwolle Vrouwen
- Full name: Prins Hendrik Ende Desespereert Nimmer Combinatie Zwolle Vrouwen
- Founded: 10 March 2010
- Ground: Sportpark Ceintuurbaan
- Capacity: 3,000
- Chairman: Adriaan Visser
- Head coach: Olivier Amelink
- League: Eredivisie
- 2025–26: 6th
- Website: http://www.fczwolle.nl/
Home colours	Away colours

PEC Zwolle Vrouwen is a Dutch women's football team from Zwolle. The team was founded in 2010, starting in the Eredivisie season 2010–11. For its first two seasons, the club worked together with Be Quick '28, another club in Zwolle. Currently they are working together with SV Zwolle, which plays in the lower level Hoofdklasse.

PEC Zwolle was formerly known as FC Zwolle until 1 July 2012, when the KNVB approved the new name.

PEC Zwolle also played in the BeNe League during all three years the league operated.

The club's highest finish was 4th in the 2017—18 season, when it was led by top scorer Babiche Roof. Roof was named Player of the Year in 2018 by GOAL! Magazine. In 2019, the club reached its only KNVB Women's Cup final, ultimately losing to AFC Ajax.

== Results Eredivisie / BeNe League ==
8	6	10	11	12	7	8	4	5	7	6	6
11	12	13	14	15	16	17	18	19	20	21	22
Women's eredivisie / BeNe League

Season	Division	Position	W – D – L = Pts	GF – GA	Top scorer	KNVB Cup
2010–11	Eredivisie	8 / 8	2 – 4 – 15 = 10	21 – 56	Vermeulen (11)	Quarterfinals
2011–12	Eredivisie	6 / 7	4 – 4 – 10 = 16	31 – 48	van Brummelen (9)	Quarterfinals
2012–13	BeNe League	10 / 16	15 – 3 – 10 = 48	75 – 58	Vermeulen (19)	Semifinals
2013–14	BeNe League	11 / 14	9 – 3 – 14 = 30	50 – 70	van Brummelen (16)	Semifinals
2014–15	BeNe League	12 / 13	5 – 3 – 16 = 18	24 – 70	Mijnheer (11)	Quarterfinals
2015–16	Eredivisie	7 / 7	2 – 5 – 17 = 11	28 – 67	Frijlink, de Graaf (7)	Round of 16
2016–17	Eredivisie	8 / 8	3 – 3 – 21 = 12	35 – 82	Doejaaren (8)	Semifinals
2017–18	Eredivisie	4 / 9	9 – 5 – 10 = 32	48 – 48	Roof (16)	Round of 16

== Players ==
=== Current squad ===
As of 18 September 2023

Note: Flags indicate national team as defined under FIFA eligibility rules; some limited exceptions apply. Players may hold more than one non-FIFA nationality.

No.	Pos.	Nation	Player
1	GK	NED	Tess van der Flier
2	DF	NED	Jasmijn Dijsselhof
3	DF	NED	Maud Rutgers
4	DF	NED	Mayke Lindner
6	DF	NED	Kely Pruim
7	MF	NED	Sterre Kroezen
8	MF	NED	Eef Kerkhof
9	FW	NED	Evi Maatman
14	DF	NED	Jeva Walk
17	FW	NED	Britt Udink
18	MF	NED	Tara te Wierik
19	FW	NED	Bo van Egmond
20	MF	NED	Ilse Kemper

No.	Pos.	Nation	Player
21	MF	NED	Nayomi Buikema
22	GK	NED	Inge Tijink
23	FW	NED	Inske Weiman
25	MF	NED	Sanne Davelaar
33	MF	NED	Sophie van Vugt
41	FW	NED	Zoë Zuidberg

=== Former internationals ===
- (Netherlands) Sylvia Smit
- (Netherlands) Lianne de Vries
- (Belgium) Maria-Laura Aga
- (Belgium) Jassina Blom
- (Kenya) Doreen Nabwire
- (Jamaica) Marlo Sweatman

== Head coaches ==
- (Netherlands) Bert Zuurman (2010–2013)
- (Netherlands) Sebastiaan Borgardijn (2013–2016)
- (Netherlands) Carin Meesters-Bakhuis (2016–2017)
- (Netherlands) Wim van der Wal (2017-2019
- (Netherlands) Joran Pot (2019-2022)
- (Netherlands) Roeland ten Berge (2022)
- (Netherlands) Olivier Amelink (2022-)
