= AFC Ajax (women) =

Dutch women's football (soccer) club

Coordinates: 52°18′48″N 4°55′44″E

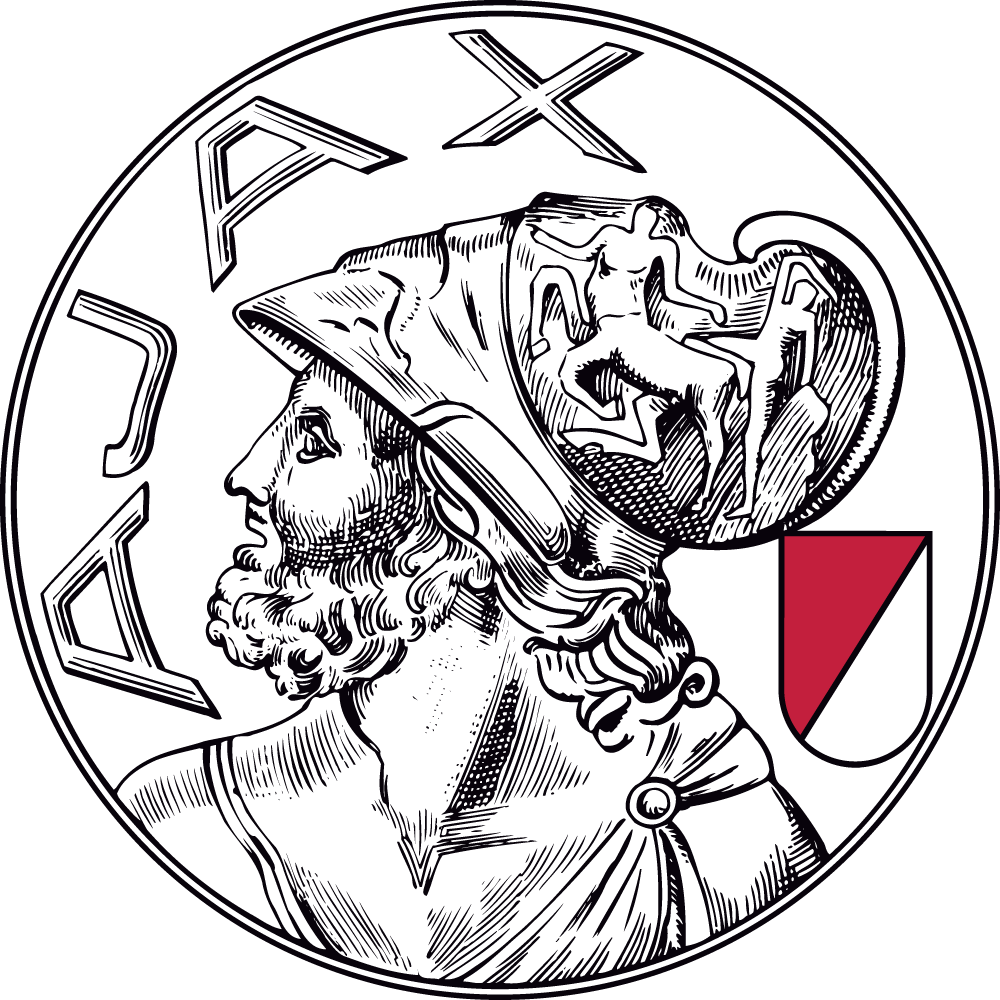
- Full name: Amsterdamsche Football Club Ajax
- Nicknames: De Godendochters (The Daughters of the Gods), De Ajacieden, De Amsterdames
- Founded: 18 May 2012; 14 years ago
- Ground: De Toekomst; Johan Cruyff Arena (selected matches)
- Capacity: 2,250; 55,865
- Owner: AFC Ajax N.V. (Euronext Amsterdam: AJAX)
- Chairman: Menno Geelen
- Head coach: Anouk Bruil
- League: Eredivisie
- 2025–26: 2nd
- Website: ajax.nl
Home colours	Away colours

AFC Ajax Vrouwen is a Dutch football club from Amsterdam representing AFC Ajax in the Vrouwen Eredivisie, the top women's league in the Netherlands. The team was founded in 2012 and played its first three seasons in the BeNe League before the Eredivisie re-formed. The club won its first title in its second season, winning the domestic KNVB Cup in the 2013–14 season. Ajax won its first two Eredivisie titles in back-to-back seasons in 2016–17 and 2017–18. It won its third title in the 2022–23 season. The best performance in the UEFA Women's Champions League came in the 2023–24 competition, when it finished second in the group stage before losing in the quarterfinals, the first Dutch club to reach that stage. After a third place finish in the 2024–25, Ajax qualified for the inaugural UEFA Women's Europa Cup.

== Current squad ==
As of 9 September 2026

Note: Flags indicate national team as defined under FIFA eligibility rules; some limited exceptions apply. Players may hold more than one non-FIFA nationality.

No.	Pos.	Nation	Player
1	GK	NED	Danae van der Vliet
2	DF	NED	Amber Visscher
3	DF	NED	Daniëlle Noordermeer
4	DF	BEL	Sari Kees
5	DF	NED	Anna Knol
6	MF	NED	Nadine Noordam
7	FW	NED	Ranneke Derks
8	MF	NED	Sherida Spitse (captain)
9	FW	NED	Katja Snoeijs
10	FW	NED	Joëlle Smits
11	FW	NED	Bo van Egmond
12	MF	NED	Jade van Hensbergen

No.	Pos.	Nation	Player
15	DF	SUI	Ella Touon
16	MF	NED	Sophie te Brake
18	DF	NED	Louise van Oosten
19	FW	NED	Mirte van Koppen
20	MF	NED	Isa Colin
21	MF	NED	Kealyn Thomas
22	GK	NED	Suus van der Weide
24	DF	NED	Daliyah de Klonia
26	FW	NED	Xanne Kip
27	MF	NED	Nurija van Schoonhoven
28	GK	NED	Femke Liefting (on loan from Chelsea)

=== Out on loan ===
Note: Flags indicate national team as defined under FIFA eligibility rules; some limited exceptions apply. Players may hold more than one non-FIFA nationality.

No.	Pos.	Nation	Player
—	MF	NED	Nayomi Buikema (at SC Heerenveen until 30 June 2027)

== Results ==
=== BeNe League / Eredivisie ===
4	3	3	2	1	1	2	2^{a}	3	2	1	2	3
13	14	15	16	17	18	19	20	21	22	23	24	25

a=at moment of abandonment due to Covid

Season	Division	Position	W – D – L = Pts	GF – GA	Top scorer	KNVB Cup
2012–13	BeNe League	4 / 16	12 – 6 – 10 = 42	47 – 36	Desiree van Lunteren (10)	Quarterfinals
2013–14	BeNe League	3 / 14	16 – 6 – 4 = 54	68 – 23	van Lunteren (13)	Winner
2014–15	BeNe League	3 / 13	17 – 2 – 5 = 53	54 – 20	Marlous Pieëte (10)	Final
2015–16	Eredivisie	2 / 7	17 – 5 – 2 = 56	46 – 11	Eshly Bakker (8)	Final
2016–17	Eredivisie	1 / 8	21 – 5 – 1 = 68	57 – 14	Marjolijn van den Bighelaar (18)	Winner
2017–18	Eredivisie	1 / 9	16 – 7 – 1 = 55	57 – 24	van den Bighelaar, van Lunteren (12)	Winner
2018–19	Eredivisie	2 / 9	13 – 8 – 3 = 47	50 – 18	Ellen Jansen (14)	Winner
2019–20	Eredivisie	2 / 8^{a}	8 – 1 – 3 = 25^{a}	22 – 11^{a}	van den Bighelaar (9)	Quarterfinals^{a}
2020–21	Eredivisie	3 / 8	13 – 1 – 6 = 40	40 – 21	Nikita Tromp (19)	Semifinals
2021–22	Eredivisie	2 / 9	17 – 3 – 4 = 54	70 – 22	Romée Leuchter (25)	Winner
2022–23	Eredivisie	1 / 11	18 – 1 – 1 = 55	67 – 15	Leuchter (18)	Round of 16
2023–24	Eredivisie	2 / 12	17 – 3 – 2 = 54	62 – 20	Leuchter (20)	Winner
2024–25	Eredivisie	3 / 12	17 – 2 – 3 = 53	57 – 22	Danique Tolhoek (19)	Round of 16

a=at moment of abandonment due to Covid

=== UEFA Women's Champions League ===
All results (away, home and aggregate) list Ajax's goal tally first.

Season	Round	Team	Home	Away	Agg/Pos (Note: or single match when home and away are empty)
2017–18	Qualifying round	(Belgium) Standard Liège			3–0
2017–18	Qualifying round	(Estonia) Pärnu			2–1
2017–18	Qualifying round	(Latvia) Rīgas FS			6–0
2017–18	Round of 32	(Italy) Brescia	1–0	0–2	1–2
2018–19	Qualifying round	(Iceland) Þór/KA			0–0
2018–19	Qualifying round	(Republic of Ireland) Wexford Youths			4–1
2018–19	Qualifying round	(Northern Ireland) Linfield			2–0
2018–19	Round of 32	(Czech Republic) Sparta Prague	2–0	2–1	4–1
2018–19	Round of 16	(France) Lyon	0–4	0–9	0–13
2020–21	Round of 32	(Germany) Bayern Munich	0–3	1–3	1–6
2022–23	QR 1 semi-final	(Sweden) Kristianstads DFF			3–1
2022–23	QR 1 final	(Germany) Eintracht Frankfurt			2–1
2022–23	QR 2	(England) Arsenal	0–1	2–2	2–3
2023–24	QR 1 final	(Belarus) Dinamo Minsk			3–0
2023–24	QR 2	(Switzerland) FC Zürich	2–0	6–0	8–0
2023–24	Group stage	(Germany) Bayern Munich	1–0	1–1	2nd out of 4
2023–24	Group stage	(France) Paris Saint-Germain	2–0	1–3	2nd out of 4
2023–24	Group stage	(Italy) Roma	2–1	0–3	2nd out of 4
2023–24	Quarter-final	(England) Chelsea	0–3	1–1	1–4
2024–25	QR 1 semi-final	(Ukraine) Kolos Kovalivka			1–1, 4–1 aet
2024–25	QR 1 final	(Italy) Fiorentina			0–1

=== UEFA Women's Europa Cup ===
Season	Round	Team	Home	Away	Agg/Pos
2025–26	QR 1	(Austria) Sturm Graz			

== Record by club ==
As of end of 2024–25 season

Opponent	Country	Pld	W	D	L	GF	GA	Season(s)
Dinamo Minsk	Belarus	1	1	0	0	3	0	2023–24
Standard Liège	Belgium	1	1	0	0	3	0	2017–18
Sparta Prague	Czech Republic	2	2	0	0	4	1	2018–19
Arsenal	England	2	0	1	1	2	3	2022–23
Chelsea	England	2	0	1	1	1	4	2023–24
Pärnu	Estonia	1	1	0	0	2	1	2017–18
Olympique Lyonnais	France	2	0	0	2	0	13	2018–19
Paris Saint-Germain	France	2	1	0	1	3	3	2023–24
Bayern Munich	Germany	4	1	1	2	3	7	2020–21, 2023–24
Eintracht Frankfurt	Germany	1	1	0	0	2	1	2022–23
Þór/KA	Iceland	1	0	1	0	0	0	2018–19
Wexford Youths	Ireland	1	1	0	0	4	1	2018–19
Brescia	Italy	2	1	0	1	1	2	2013–14
Fiorentina	Italy	1	0	0	1	0	1	2024–25
Roma	Italy	2	1	0	1	2	4	2023–24
Rīgas FS	Latvia	1	1	0	0	6	0	2017–18
Linfield	Northern Ireland	1	1	0	0	2	0	2018–19
Kristianstads DFF	Sweden	1	1	0	0	3	1	2022–23
Zürich	Switzerland	2	2	0	0	8	0	2023–24
Kolos Kovalivka	Ukraine	1	0	1	0	4	1	2024–25

== Honours ==
National

- Eredivisie
  - Winners (3): 2016-17, 2017-18, 2022-23
- KNVB Women's Cup
  - Winners (6): 2013-14, 2016-17, 2017-18, 2018-19, 2021-22, 2023-24
- BeNe League
  - Third place (2): 2013-14, 2014-15

== Affiliated clubs ==
On 13 January 2013, it was revealed that AFC Ajax Vrouwen would partner with SV Overbos, the women's team from Hoofddorp.

- (Netherlands) SV Overbos (2013–present)

== Coaching staff ==
Position	Name
Head coach	(Netherlands) Anouk Bruil
Assistant coach	(Netherlands) Sonny Silooy
Assistant coach	(Netherlands) Kirsten Bakker
Goalkeeping coach	(Netherlands) Robbie Tetteroo
Performance coach	(Netherlands) Eva Hovenkamp
	(Netherlands) Michiel van Tilburg

== Head coaches ==
- (Netherlands) Ed Engelkes (2012–2016)
- (Netherlands) Benno Nihom (2016-2019)
- (Netherlands) Danny Schenkel (2019–2022)
- (Netherlands) Suzanne Bakker (2022–2024) (Rinus Michel Award winner in 2024)
- (Netherlands) Hesterine de Reus (2024–2025)
- (Netherlands) Anouk Bruil (2025–present)

== Broadcasting ==
As of 2025, all league matches played are broadcast on ESPN. Public service broadcaster NOS occasionally provides game highlights during the Studio Sport programme.
