= Netherlands women's national under-17 football team =

National U-17 association football team

Netherlands Women's U-17
- Nickname(s): Oranje (Orange); Leeuwinnen (Lionesses)
- Association: Royal Dutch Football Association (KNVB)
- Confederation: UEFA (Europe)
- Head coach: Thomas Oostendorp
- FIFA code: NED
First colours	Second colours

First international
- Netherlands 2–0 Azerbaijan; 08 October 2007

Biggest win
- Ukraine 0–16 Netherlands; 25 October 2012; Netherlands 16–0 Georgia; 17 October 2018

Biggest defeat
- Netherlands 0–5 North Korea; 24 October 2025

FIFA U-17 Women's World Cup
- Appearances: 1 (first in 2025)
- Best result: (silver) Runners-Up (2025)

UEFA Women's Under-17 Championship
- Appearances: 6 (first in 2010)
- Best result: (gold) Champions (2025)

Netherlands women's national under-17 football team represents Netherlands in international youth football competitions.

== Competitive record ==
=== FIFA U-17 Women's World Cup ===
Year	Result	Pld	W	D*	L	GF	GA
(New Zealand) 2008	Did not qualify						
(Trinidad and Tobago) 2010	Did not qualify						
(Azerbaijan) 2012	Did not qualify						
(Costa Rica) 2014	Did not qualify						
(Jordan) 2016	Did not qualify						
(Uruguay) 2018	Did not qualify						
(India) 2022	Did not qualify						
(Dominican Republic) 2024	Did not qualify						
(Morocco) 2025	Runners-up	7	2	2	3	8	15
(Morocco) 2026	Did not qualify						
(Morocco) 2027	To be determined						
(Morocco) 2028	To be determined						
(Morocco) 2029	To be determined						
Total	1/13	7	2	2	3	8	15

* Draws include knockout matches decided by penalty shoot-out.

=== UEFA Women's Under-17 Championship ===
The team has qualified six times for the UEFA Women's Under-17 Championship. They were champions in 2025.

Year	Result	Position	Pld	W	D*	L	GF	GA
(Switzerland) 2008	Did not qualify							
(Switzerland) 2009	Did not qualify							
(Switzerland) 2010	Fourth place	4th	2	0	0	2	0	6
(Switzerland) 2011	Did not qualify							
(Switzerland) 2012	Did not qualify							
(Switzerland) 2013	Did not qualify							
(England) 2014	Did not qualify							
(Iceland) 2015	Did not qualify							
(Belarus) 2016	Did not qualify							
(Czech Republic) 2017	Third place	3rd	4	2	1	1	5	4
(Lithuania) 2018	Group stage	GS	3	1	1	1	12	4
(Bulgaria) 2019	Runners-Up	2nd	5	3	1	1	11	7
(Sweden) 2020	cancelled due to Covid							
(Faroe Islands) 2021	cancelled due to Covid							
(Bosnia and Herzegovina) 2022	Fourth place	4th	5	1	1	3	9	8
(Estonia) 2023	Did not qualify							
(Sweden) 2024	Did not qualify							
(Faroe Islands) 2025	Champions	1st	5	4	1	0	18	3
(Northern Ireland) 2026	Did not qualify							
(Finland) 2027	TBD							
(Belgium) 2028	TBD							
(Turkey) 2029	TBD							
Total	6/16	1 Title	24	11	5	8	55	32

== Head-to-head record ==
The following table shows Netherlands' head-to-head record in the FIFA U-17 Women's World Cup.

Opponent	Pld	W	D	L	GF	GA	GD	Win %
Cameroon	1	1	0	0	4	3	+1	100.00
France	1	0	1	0	2	2	+0	0.00
Mexico	2	1	0	1	1	1	+0	50.00
North Korea	2	0	0	2	0	8	−8	0.00
United States	1	0	1	0	1	1	+0	0.00
Total	7	2	2	3	8	15	−7	28.57

== See also ==
- Netherlands women's national football team
- Netherlands women's national under-19 football team
- FIFA U-17 Women's World Cup
- UEFA Women's Under-17 Championship
