= 2019–20 PEC Zwolle (women) season =

PEC Zwolle
2019–20 season
- Chairman: Adriaan Visser
- Manager: Joran Pot
- Stadium: MAC³PARK stadion
- Eredivisie: 7th place
- KNVB Cup: Round of 8
- Eredivisie Cup: 5th place
- Top goalscorer: League: (Netherlands) Nikita Tromp (5); Cup: (Netherlands) Rebecca Doejaaren (3); Eredivisie Cup: (Netherlands) Dominique Bruinenberg (7); All: (Netherlands) Rebecca Doejaaren (11) (Netherlands) Dominique Bruinenberg (11)
- Highest home attendance: 3,217 (PEC – PSV)
- Lowest home attendance: 200 (ADO Den Haag – PEC)
Home colours	Away colours

The 2019–20 season was PEC Zwolle's 10th season of play in the Eredivisie and also its 10th consecutive season in the top flight of Dutch football for women. When COVID-19 spread around the Netherlands all upcoming footballmatches were postponed. On the 22nd of April the KNVB ended all amateur and women footballcompetitions for the 2019–20 season. The team finished seventh in the table.

== Competitions ==
=== Friendlies ===
21 June 2019 Friendly	PEC Zwolle	0 – 5	SC Heerenveen	Zwolle
			Unknown

5 July 2019 Friendly	FSV Gütersloh 2009 (Germany)	4 – 4	PEC Zwolle	Rheda-Wiedenbrück
	Unknown		Lauri Weijkamp; Rebecca Doejaaren; Marushka van Olst; Yvette van Daelen

10 July 2019 Friendly	Borussia Bocholt (Germany)	2 – 7	PEC Zwolle	Borken
	Unknown		Unknown

13 July 2019 Friendly	SV Werder Bremen (Germany)	0 – 2	PEC Zwolle	Leer
			Maxime Bennink; Pascalle Pomper

13 August 2019 Friendly	PEC Zwolle	4 – 0	Be Quick '28	Zwolle
	Yvette van Daelen 3'; Dominique Bruinenberg 21'; Amy Banarsie 65', 82'

17 August 2019 Friendly	PEC Zwolle	4 – 0	(Belgium) KRC Genk Ladies	Zwolle
	Nikita Tromp 3'; Maud Asbroek 37'; Dominique Bruinenberg 84'; Rebecca Doejaaren 87'

30 August 2019 Friendly	BV Cloppenburg (Germany)	1 – 3	PEC Zwolle	Emmen
	Unknown		Shanel Smid; Celien Tiemens; Amy Banarsie

4 October 2019 Friendly	PEC Zwolle	0 – 0	(Belgium) Oud-Heverlee Leuven	Bavel

21 June 2019 Friendly	PEC Zwolle	4 – 0	SC Heerenveen	Zwolle
	Jill Diekman; Amy Banarsie; Yvette van Daelen; Lauri Weijkamp

18 January 2020 Friendly	PEC Zwolle	3 – 1	SV Saestum	Zwolle
	Nikita Tromp; Rebecca Doejaaren; Yvette van Daelen

24 January 2020 Friendly	PEC Zwolle	3 – 0	Be Quick '28	Zwolle
	Rebecca Doejaaren; Yvette van Daelen; Dominique Bruinenberg

=== Eredivisie ===
==== Results summary ====
Overall								Home						Away					
Pld	W	D	L	GF	GA	GD	Pts	W	D	L	GF	GA	GD	W	D	L	GF	GA	GD
12	2	4	6	17	32	−15	10	1	1	3	9	16	−7	1	3	3	8	16	−8

Source: League matches

==== Results by matchday ====
Round	1	2	3	4	5	6	7	8	9	10	11	12	13	14
Ground	H	A	H	A	H	H	A	A	H	A	H	A	H	A
Result	L	L	L	D	D	D	D	W	L	L	W	L	C	C
Position	8	8	8	8	7	7	6	6	7	7	7	7	7	7

Updated to match(es) played on Final. Source: KNVB
A = Away; H = Home; W = Win; D = Draw; L = Loss; C = Cancelled

==== Matches ====
Win Draw Loss

23 August 2019 1	PEC Zwolle	2 – 4	ADO Den Haag	Zwolle
	Gwyneth Hendriks 62' (o.g.); Jeslin Niens (yellow card) 68'; Pleun Raaijmakers 90' (o.g.)	Report; Matchreport	(yellow card) 20' (red card) 61' Sharon Kok; 21', 53' Maartje Looijen; 69' Marisa Olislagers; 82' Jaimy Ravensbergen	Stadium: MAC³PARK Stadion; Attendance: 350; Referee: Arends

6 September 2019 2	PSV	4 – 0	PEC Zwolle	Eindhoven
	Joëlle Smits 69'; Katja Snoeijs 73', 80'; Aniek Nouwen 88'	Report; Matchreport	(yellow card) 52' Jeslin Niens	Stadium: Sportcomplex De Herdgang; Attendance: 725; Referee: Van Zuilichem

13 September 2019 3	PEC Zwolle	2 – 4	AFC Ajax	Zwolle
	Dominique Bruinenberg 8'; Rebecca Doejaaren 35'	Report; Matchreport	14' Marjolijn van den Bighelaar; 25' Ellen Jansen; 42' Iina Salmi; 53' Vanity Lewerissa	Stadium: MAC³PARK Stadion; Attendance: 1,646; Referee: Broekhuizen

20 September 2019 4	VV Alkmaar	2 – 2	PEC Zwolle	Alkmaar
	Niekie Pellens (yellow card) 66'; Chante Dompig 86'; Anna Ursem 89'	Report; Matchreport	26' Dominique Bruinenberg; 43' Nikita Tromp	Stadium: Sportpark Robonsbosweg; Attendance: 350; Referee: Beljert

27 September 2019 5	PEC Zwolle	3 – 3	SC Heerenveen	Zwolle
	Nikita Tromp 65' (pen.), 76' (pen.); Dominique Bruinenberg 67'; Celien Tiemens (yellow card) 90+3'	Report; Matchreport	7', 44' Suzanne Admiraal; 16' Laura Strik; (yellow card) Roos van der Veen	Stadium: MAC³PARK Stadion; Attendance: 670; Referee: Verhaag

13 October 2019 6	PEC Zwolle	2 – 2	Excelsior/Barendrecht	Zwolle
	Nikita Tromp 54', 83'	Report; Matchreport	37' Joy Kersten; (yellow card) 68' Fréderique Nieuwland; 90+6' Eline Koster	Stadium: MAC³PARK Stadion; Attendance: 438; Referee: Koster

3 November 2019 7	FC Twente	2 – 2	PEC Zwolle	Enschede
	Renate Jansen 28'; Lynn Wilms 72'	Report; Matchreport	33' Amy Banarsie; 41' Leonie Vliek; (yellow card) 80' Imre van der Vegt; (yellow card) 87' Moon Pondes	Stadium: Sportpark Het Diekman; Attendance: 365; Referee: Kuiper

17 November 2019 8	ADO Den Haag	1 – 2	PEC Zwolle	The Hague
	Maartje Looijen 27'	Report; Matchreport	11' (o.g.) Kim Mourmans; 24' Dominique Bruinenberg	Stadium: Cars Jeans Stadion; Attendance: 200; Referee: Michielsen

22 November 2019 9	PEC Zwolle	0 – 4	PSV	Zwolle
		Report; Matchreport	11', 71' Joëlle Smits; 32', 81' Katja Snoeijs	Stadium: MAC³PARK Stadion; Attendance: 3,217; Referee: Boringa

29 November 2019 10	AFC Ajax	4 – 0	PEC Zwolle	Amsterdam
	Marjolijn van den Bighelaar 18', 19', 50'; Vanity Lewerissa 81'	Report; Matchreport		Stadium: Sportpark De Toekomst; Attendance: 400; Referee: Broekhuizen

7 February 2020 11	PEC Zwolle	2 – 1	VV Alkmaar	Zwolle
	Maud Asbroek 38' (yellow card) 69'; Rebecca Doejaaren 40'	Report; Matchreport	60' Anna Ursem	Stadium: MAC³PARK Stadion; Attendance: 2,456; Referee: Knetsch

14 February 2020 12	SC Heerenveen	1 – 0	PEC Zwolle	Heerenveen
	Laura Strik (yellow card) 20'; Zoï van de Ven 68'; Quinty Sabajo (yellow card) 90+4'	Report; Matchreport	(yellow card) 69' Nikita Tromp	Stadium: Sportpark Skoatterwâld; Attendance: 370; Referee: Wolthof

20 March 2020 13	Excelsior/Barendrecht	Cancelled	PEC Zwolle	Rotterdam
		Report [ Matchreport]		Stadium: Sportpark De Bongerd
Note: Match was initially scheduled for 20 March 2020, but cancelled due to the COVID-19 pandemic.

27 March 2020 14	PEC Zwolle	Cancelled	FC Twente	Zwolle
		Report [ Matchreport]		Stadium: MAC³PARK Stadion
Note: Match was initially scheduled for 27 March 2020, but cancelled due to the COVID-19 pandemic.

=== KNVB Cup ===
1 February 2020 Round of 16	BVV Barendrecht	0 – 7	PEC Zwolle	Barendrecht
17.30		Report	18' Lauri Weijkamp; 32' Yvette van Daelen; 36', 68' Marushka van Olst; 45', 53', 72' Rebecca Doejaaren; (yellow card) 45' Maud Asbroek	Stadium: Sportpark de Bongerd

14 March 2020 Round of 8	AFC Ajax	Cancelled	PEC Zwolle	Amsterdam
17.00		Report [ Matchreport]		Stadium: Sportpark De Toekomst
Note: Match was initially scheduled for 14 March 2020, but cancelled due to the COVID-19 pandemic.

=== Eredivisie Cup ===
18 October 2019 First round	Excelsior/Barendrecht	0 – 2	PEC Zwolle	Rotterdam
19.30		=	3' Amy Banarsie; 52' Dominique Bruinenberg	Stadium: Sportpark de Bongerd

25 October 2019 First round	PEC Zwolle	4 – 2	Excelsior/Barendrecht	Zwolle
19.30	Marushka van Olst 30', 37'; Rebecca Doejaaren 38'; Beau Rijks (yellow card) 42'; Dominique Bruinenberg 51'	Matchreport	(yellow card) 14' Senna El Messaoudi; (yellow card) 25' Fréderique Nieuwland; 80' Sophie Cobussen; 83' Iris van Bokhoven	Stadium: MAC³PARK Stadion; Attendance: 562; Referee: Karacaoglan

6 December 2019 Second round	PEC Zwolle	5 – 4	FC Twente	Zwolle
19.30	Maud Asbroek (yellow card) 21'; Dominique Bruinenberg 36', 72'; Marushka van Olst 43'; Lauri Weijkamp (yellow card) 52'; Nikita Tromp 57'; Rebecca Doejaaren 82'	Matchreport	34', 80' Renate Jansen; 60' Cheyenne van den Goorbergh; 89' Suzanne Giesen; (yellow card) 90' Lynn Wilms	Stadium: MAC³PARK Stadion; Attendance: 400

13 December 2019 Second round	FC Twente	4 – 2	PEC Zwolle	Enschede
19.30	Bente Jansen 11'; Suzanne Giesen (yellow card) 64'; Danique Ypema (yellow card) 69'; Davina Vanmechelen 80'; Sabrine Ellouzi 83'; Renate Jansen 90+3'	Matchreport	13' Maud Asbroek; 52' Rebecca Doejaaren	Stadium: Sportpark Het Diekman; Attendance: 190; Referee: Van Schaik

21 February 2020 Third round	Excelsior/Barendrecht	1 – 3	PEC Zwolle	Rotterdam
19.30	Iris van Bokhoven 85'		35' (pen.) Nikita Tromp; 50' Lauri Weijkamp; 75' Dominique Bruinenberg	Stadium: Sportpark de Bongerd

28 February 2020 Third round	PEC Zwolle	6 – 2	Excelsior/Barendrecht	Zwolle
19.30	Nikita Tromp 5'; Jeslin Niens (yellow card) 7'; Dominique Bruinenberg 15', 86' (pen.); Rebecca Doejaaren 31', 42', 59'	Matchreport	62', 67' Eline Koster	Stadium: MAC³PARK Stadion; Attendance: 200; Referee: Fledderus

== Statistics ==
=== Appearances and goals ===
No.	Pos	Nat	Player	Total		Eredivisie		KNVB Cup		Eredivisie Cup	
No.	Pos	Nat	Player	Apps	Goals	Apps	Goals	Apps	Goals	Apps	Goals
1	GK	(Netherlands) NED	Nienke Olthof	10	0	7+1	0	0	0	2	0
2	DF	(Netherlands) NED	Leonie Vliek	17	1	12	1	1	0	4	0
3	DF	(Netherlands) NED	Moïsa van Koot	18	0	12	0	1	0	5	0
4	DF	(Netherlands) NED	Shanel Smid	11	0	2+3	0	1	0	5	0
5	DF	(Netherlands) NED	Jeslin Niens	12	0	7+1	0	1	0	2+1	0
6	MF	(Netherlands) NED	Maud Asbroek	16	2	11	1	1	0	4	1
8	MF	(Netherlands) NED	Celien Tiemens	12	0	9	0	0	0	1+2	0
9	FW	(Netherlands) NED	Rebecca Doejaaren	18	11	10+2	2	1	3	4+1	6
10	FW	(Netherlands) NED	Nikita Tromp	16	8	12	5	0	0	4	3
11	FW	(Netherlands) NED	Yvette van Daelen	8	1	0+3	0	1	1	0+4	0
14	FW	(Netherlands) NED	Bonita Theunissen	3	0	0+2	0	0	0	1	0
17	MF	(Netherlands) NED	Kely Pruim	7	0	1+2	0	0+1	0	2+1	0
20	FW	(Netherlands) NED	Lauri Weijkamp	14	2	4+3	0	1	1	5+1	1
21	MF	(Netherlands) NED	Dominique Bruinenberg	19	11	12	4	1	0	6	7
22	MF	(Netherlands) NED	Beau Rijks	10	0	8	0	0	0	2	0
23	GK	(Netherlands) NED	Tirsa Postma	2	0	0	0	0	0	2	0
24	MF	(Netherlands) NED	Amy Banarsie	15	2	4+5	1	0+1	0	5	1
25	DF	(Netherlands) NED	Dara Broekhaar	1	0	0	0	0+1	0	0	0
26	GK	(Netherlands) NED	Moon Pondes	8	0	5	0	1	0	2	0
33	FW	(Netherlands) NED	Marushka van Olst	18	5	8+4	0	1	2	4+1	3
36	DF	(Netherlands) NED	Imre van der Vegt	8	0	2+3	0	0	0	3	0
38	DF	(Netherlands) NED	Marit Auée	12	0	5+2	0	0	0	3+2	0

Last updated: 1 March 2020
Source: Competitions

=== Goalscorers ===
No.	Pos	Nat	Name	Eredivisie	KNVB Cup	Eredivisie Cup	Total
21	MF	(Netherlands)	Dominique Bruinenberg	4	0	7	11
9	FW	(Netherlands)	Rebecca Doejaaren	2	3	6	11
10	FW	(Netherlands)	Nikita Tromp	5	0	2	7
33	FW	(Netherlands)	Marushka van Olst	0	2	2	4
24	MF	(Netherlands)	Amy Banarsie	1	0	1	2
20	FW	(Netherlands)	Lauri Weijkamp	0	1	1	2
2	DF	(Netherlands)	Leonie Vliek	1	0	0	1
6	MF	(Netherlands)	Maud Asbroek	0	0	1	1
11	FW	(Netherlands)	Yvette van Daelen	0	1	0	1
Own goal				3	0	0	0
Totals				16	7	20	43

Last updated: 1 March 2020

=== Disciplinary record ===
No.	Pos	Nat	Name	Eredivisie			KNVB Cup			Eredivisie Cup			Total		
No.	Pos	Nat	Name	Booked	(yellow card) (yellow-red card)	Sent off (straight red)	Booked	(yellow card) (yellow-red card)	Sent off (straight red)	Booked	(yellow card) (yellow-red card)	Sent off (straight red)	Booked	(yellow card) (yellow-red card)	Sent off (straight red)
5	MF	(Netherlands)	Jeslin Niens	2	0	0	0	0	0	1	0	0	3	0	0
6	MF	(Netherlands)	Maud Asbroek	1	0	0	1	0	0	1	0	0	3	0	0
8	MF	(Netherlands)	Celien Tiemens	1	0	0	0	0	0	0	0	0	1	0	0
26	GK	(Netherlands)	Moon Pondes	1	0	0	0	0	0	0	0	0	1	0	0
10	FW	(Netherlands)	Nikita Tromp	1	0	0	0	0	0	0	0	0	1	0	0
36	DF	(Netherlands)	Imre van der Vegt	1	0	0	0	0	0	0	0	0	1	0	0
20	FW	(Netherlands)	Lauri Weijkamp	0	0	0	0	0	0	1	0	0	1	0	0
22	DF	(Netherlands)	Beau Rijks	0	0	0	0	0	0	1	0	0	1	0	0
Totals				6	0	0	1	0	0	4	0	0	11	0	0

Last updated: 1 March 2020
