= 2017–18 PEC Zwolle (women) season =

PEC Zwolle
2017–18 season
- Chairman: Adriaan Visser
- Manager: Wim van der Wal
- Stadium: MAC³PARK stadion
- Eredivisie: 4th place
- KNVB Cup: Round of 16
- Top goalscorer: League: (Netherlands) Babiche Roof (15); Cup: (England) Abby Holmes (1)
Home colours	Away colours

The 2017–18 season is PEC Zwolle's 8th season of play in the Eredivisie and also its 8th consecutive season in the top flight of Dutch football for women.

== Competitions ==
=== Friendlies ===
14 July 2017 Friendly	SC Buitenveldert	1 – 3	PEC Zwolle	Amsterdam
	Unknown		(–) Maxime Bennink (–) Esmee de Graaf	Stadium: Sportpark Buitenveldert

16 August 2017 Friendly	(Germany) BV Cloppenburg	1 – 2	PEC Zwolle	(Germany) Cloppenburg
			Esmee de Graaf; Maxime Bennink

19 August 2017 Friendly	(Belgium) AA Gent	4 – 3	PEC Zwolle	(Belgium) Ghent
			(–) Esmee de Graaf; Babiche Roof

23 August 2017 Friendly	DTS Ede	1 – 2	PEC Zwolle	Ede
	Sofie Houba		43' Leonie Vliek; 75' Maxime Bennink

21 September 2017 Friendly	PEC Zwolle	8 – 1	VV Eldenia	Zwolle
	Babiche Roof (4x); Esmee de Graaf (3x); Nurija van Schoonhoven		Unknown	Stadium: MAC³PARK Stadion

21 October 2017 Friendly	PEC Zwolle	2 – 1	(Belgium) KRC Genk Ladies	Zwolle
	Rebecca Doejaaren 53', 87'		33' Hanne Merckelbach	Stadium: MAC³PARK Stadion

=== Eredivisie ===
==== Results summary ====
Overall								Home						Away					
Pld	W	D	L	GF	GA	GD	Pts	W	D	L	GF	GA	GD	W	D	L	GF	GA	GD
15	5	4	6	30	25	+5	19	2	1	3	8	9	−1	3	3	3	22	16	+6

Source: League matches

==== Results by matchday ====
Matchday	1	2	3	4	5	6	7	8	9	10	11	12	13	14	15	16	17	18
Ground	H	A	–	A	A	H	A	H	A	A	H	–	H	H	A	H	A	H
Result	L	D	–	W	L	W	L	W	D	L	L	–	W	W	D	L	W	W
Position	8	8	–	6	7	5	7	4	4	7	7	–	7	4	4	6	3	3

Source: PEC Zwolle
A = Away; H = Home; W = Win; D = Draw; L = Loss

==== Matches ====
Win Draw Loss

1 September 2017 1	PEC Zwolle	0 – 3	FC Twente	Zwolle
19.30		Report; Matchreport	38' Jassina Blom; 58' Joëlle Smits; 65' Ellen Jansen	Stadium: MAC³PARK stadion Attendance: 522; Referee: Boringa

8 September 2017 2	ADO Den Haag	2 – 2	PEC Zwolle	The Hague
19.30	Suzanne Admiraal 17'; Carmen Simonis 60' (pen.); Victoria Pelova (yellow card) 90'	Report; Matchreport	(yellow card) 59' Abby Holmes; (yellow card) 65' Nurija van Schoonhoven; 70' Babiche Roof; 90+5' Shanel Smid	Stadium: Kyocera Stadion; Attendance: 400; Referee: Van den Hoed

29 September 2017 4	VV Alkmaar	1 – 7	PEC Zwolle	Alkmaar
19.30	Katja Snoeijs 73'; Jaimy Visser (yellow card) 87'	Report; Matchreport	1', 62' Abby Holmes; 28', 65' Esmee de Graaf; 39' (o.g.) Amber Wuring; 55' Marlo Sweatman; 81' Lauri Weijkamp	Stadium: Sportpark Robonsbosweg; Attendance: 114

13 October 2017 5	AFC Ajax	5 – 2	PEC Zwolle	Amsterdam
14.30	Liza van der Most 8'; Kelly Zeeman 21', 79'; Desiree van Lunteren 65', 85'	Report; Matchreport	25', 51' Yvette van Daelen; (yellow card) 61' Babiche Roof	Stadium: Sportpark De Toekomst; Referee: Tjong A Hung

27 October 2017 6	PEC Zwolle	2 – 0	Excelsior Barendrecht	Zwolle
19.30	Babiche Roof 20' (pen.), 37'	Report; Matchreport	(yellow card) 20' Frederique Nieuwland	Stadium: MAC³PARK stadion Attendance: 1.246; Referee: Midden

3 November 2017 7	SC Heerenveen	2 – 1	PEC Zwolle	Heerenveen
19.30	Fenna Kalma 38', 45+1'	Report; Matchreport	28' Babiche Roof	Stadium: Sportpark Skoatterwâld; Attendance: 200; Referee: Zeeman

10 November 2017 8	PEC Zwolle	3 – 1	PSV	Zwolle
19.30	Maxime Bennink 3'; Babiche Roof 42', 90'	Report; Matchreport	24' Anouk Nouwen	Stadium: MAC³PARK stadion Attendance: 485; Referee: Weghorst

17 November 2017 9	Achilles ´29	1 – 1	PEC Zwolle	Groesbeek
19.30	Melanie Bross 38'; Glenda van Lieshout (yellow card) 59'	Report; Matchreport	(yellow card) 61' Yvette van Daelen; 65' Esmee de Graaf; (yellow card) 90+1' Abby Holmes	Stadium: Sportpark De Heikant; Attendance: 225; Referee: Jensch

1 December 2017 10	FC Twente	2 – 1	PEC Zwolle	Enschede
19.30	Ellen Jansen 7'; Renate Jansen 73'	Report; Matchreport	8' Rebecca Doejaaren; (yellow card) 85' Abby Holmes	Stadium: De Grolsch Veste; Referee: Migchelbrink

30 January 2018 11	PEC Zwolle	0 – 1	ADO Den Haag	Zwolle
19.30		Report; Matchreport	71' Suzanne Admiraal	Stadium: MAC³PARK stadion Referee: Loontjes

22 December 2017 13	PEC Zwolle	2 – 1	VV Alkmaar	Zwolle
19.30	Abby Holmes (yellow card) 2'; Maxime Bennink 40'; Babiche Roof 86' (pen.)	Report; Matchreport	83' Katja Snoeijs; (yellow card) Paulina Quaye	Stadium: MAC³PARK stadion

26 January 2018 14	Excelsior Barendrecht	1 – 5	PEC Zwolle	Rotterdam
19.30	Sherallin Henriquez 5'	Report; Matchreport	25' Esmee de Graaf; 47' Rebecca Doejaaren; (penalty missed) 86' Babiche Roof; 57' Maxime Bennink; 90' Suzanne Giesen	Stadium: Stadion Woudestein; Attendance: 512; Referee: Post

2 February 2018 15	PEC Zwolle	2 – 2	AFC Ajax	Zwolle
19.30	Lauri Weijkamp 28'; Babiche Roof 57' (yellow card) 79'	Report; Matchreport	(yellow card) 81' (goal) 87' Stefanie van der Gragt; 90+1' Marjolijn van den Bighelaar	Stadium: MAC³PARK stadion Attendance: 3,165; Referee: Van Dijk

9 February 2018 16	PEC Zwolle	1 – 2	SC Heerenveen	Zwolle
19.30	Babiche Roof 10'; Nurija van Schoonhoven (yellow card) 26'	Report; Matchreport	55', 61' Tiny Hoekstra	Stadium: MAC³PARK stadion Attendance: 522; Referee: Alberts

16 February 2018 17	PSV	1 – 2	PEC Zwolle	Eindhoven
19.30	Kristina Erman 90+2'	Report; Matchreport	47' (o.g.) Kim Mourmans; (yellow card) 70' Esmee de Graaf; 87' Maxime Bennink	Stadium: Jan Louwers Stadion; Attendance: 652; Referee: De Loos

23 February 2018 18	PEC Zwolle	3 – 1	Achilles ´29	Zwolle
19.30	Yvette van Daelen 31'; Babiche Roof 72'; Maxime Bennink 83'	Report; Matchreport	14' Melissa Evers	Stadium: MAC³PARK stadion Attendance: 420; Referee: Van der Hoek

=== Championship play-off ===
==== Results summary ====
Overall								Home						Away					
Pld	W	D	L	GF	GA	GD	Pts	W	D	L	GF	GA	GD	W	D	L	GF	GA	GD
8	2	2	4	14	22	−8	8	0	2	2	8	14	−6	2	0	2	6	8	−2

Source: League matches

==== Results by matchday ====
Matchday	1	2	3	4	5	6	7	8	9	10
Ground	A	H	A	H	–	H	A	H	A	–
Result	L	D	W	D	–	L	L	L	W	–
Position	3	4	3	3	–	4	4	4	4	–

Source: PEC Zwolle
A = Away; H = Home; W = Win; D = Draw; L = Loss

==== Matches ====
Win Draw Loss

16 March 2018 1	AFC Ajax	3 – 1	PEC Zwolle	Amsterdam
19.30	Marjolijn van den Bighelaar 9'; Merel van Dongen 31'; Desiree van Lunteren 36'; Linda Bakker (yellow card) 89'	Report; Matchreport	64' Abby Holmes	Stadium: Sportpark De Toekomst

23 March 2018 2	PEC Zwolle	2 – 2	SC Heerenveen	Zwolle
19.30	Babiche Roof 41'; Abby Holmes 71'	Report; Matchreport	9', 90+5' Fenna Kalma	Stadium: MAC³PARK stadion Attendance: 840; Referee: Poffers

30 March 2018 3	FC Twente	1 – 3	PEC Zwolle	Enschede
14.30	Joëlle Smits 24'	Report; Matchreport	7' Esmee de Graaf; 43', 86' Babiche Roof	Stadium: De Grolsch Veste; Attendance: 350; Referee: Brinkkemper

20 April 2018 4	PEC Zwolle	3 – 3	PSV	Zwolle
19.30	Babiche Roof 53', 74' (pen.); Maud Asbroek 84'	Report; Matchreport	14' Nadia Coolen; 60' Vanity Lewerissa; 69' (yellow card) Kirsten Koopmans	Stadium: MAC³PARK stadion Attendance: 810; Referee: Noppers

6 May 2018 6	PEC Zwolle	0 – 4	AFC Ajax	Zwolle
14.30		Report	3', 12' Desiree van Lunteren; 54' Linda Bakker; 65' Inessa Kaagman; (yellow card) 84' Soraya Verhoeve	Stadium: MAC³PARK stadion Attendance: 2,050; Referee: Sarah Anna Brinkkemper

11 May 2018 7	SC Heerenveen	3 – 0	PEC Zwolle	Heerenveen
19.30	Tiny Hoekstra 40'; Fenna Kalma 63'; Chantal Schouwstra (yellow card) 81'; Dana Philippo 83'	Report; Matchreport		Stadium: Sportpark Skoatterwâld; Attendance: 350; Referee: Mesbah

18 May 2018 8	PEC Zwolle	3 – 5	FC Twente	Zwolle
19.30	Esmee de Graaf 8', 68'; Babiche Roof 27'	Report; Matchreport	26' (pen.) Myrthe Moorrees; 66' (pen.) Joëlle Smits; 83', 84' Renate Jansen; 90+2' Sabrine Ellouzi	Stadium: MAC³PARK stadion Attendance: 427; Referee: Van Dijk

21 May 2018 9	PSV	1 – 2	PEC Zwolle	Eindhoven
14.30	Lucie Akkerman 41'	Report; Matchreport	59' Esmee de Graaf; 84' Babiche Roof	Stadium: Jan Louwers Stadion; Attendance: 800; Referee: Virancikli

=== KNVB Cup ===
11 March 2018 Round of 16	CTO Amsterdam	2 – 1	PEC Zwolle	Amsterdam
17.15	Nikita Tromp 54'; Samantha van Diemen 65'	Report [ Matchreport]	55' Abby Holmes	Stadium: Olympic Stadium

== Statistics ==
=== Squad details and appearances ===
Nr.	Nat.	Name	Eredivisie		KNVB Cup		Total		Season	Signed from	Debut
Nr.	Nat.	Name	G	Goal	G	Goal	G	Goal	Season	Signed from	Debut
Goalkeepers
1	(Netherlands)	Nadja Olthuis	3	0	0	0	3	0	8th	(Netherlands) SC Heerenveen	24 September 2015
16	(Netherlands)	Moon Pondes	4	0	0	0	4	0	2nd	(Netherlands) FC Twente	5 May 2017
22	(Croatia)	Stephanie Bukovec	16	0	1	0	17	0	1st	(Sweden) Töcksfors IF	10 November 2017
28	(Netherlands)	Tirsa Postma	1	0	0	0	0	0	1st	Academy	23 February 2018
Defenders
2	(Netherlands)	Joos van Os	1	0	0	0	1	0	2nd	(Netherlands) FC Twente	2 September 2016
3	(Netherlands)	Pascalle Tang	3	0	0	0	3	0	2nd	(Netherlands) SC Heerenveen	17 February 2017
13	(United States)	Siobhan McDonough	22	0	1	0	23	0	1st	(United States) Boston Breakers	29 September 2017
19	(Netherlands)	Yvette van Daelen	24	3	1	0	25	3	6th	Academy	9 November 2012
24	(England)	Abby Holmes	21	4	1	1	22	5	1st	(England) Sunderland A.F.C.	8 September 2017
25	(Netherlands)	Lotte Morsink	2	0	0	0	2	0	1st	Academy	1 September 2017
27	(Netherlands)	Shanel Smid	24	1	1	0	25	1	1st	Academy	1 September 2017
Midfielders
4	(Netherlands)	Suzanne Giesen	18	1	1	0	19	1	4th	(Netherlands) RKHVV	2 September 2014
6	(Netherlands)	Nurija van Schoonhoven	24	0	1	0	25	0	3rd	Academy	6 November 2015
8	(Netherlands)	Sharon Bruinenberg	1	0	0	0	1	0	6th	Academy	16 March 2013
10	(Netherlands)	Babiche Roof	24	15	1	0	25	15	1st	(Netherlands) Telstar	1 September 2017
14	(United States)	Marlo Sweatman	12	1	1	0	13	1	1st	(Sweden) Töcksfors IF	29 September 2017
18	(Netherlands)	Maud Asbroek	15	0	1	0	16	0	1st	Academy	1 September 2017
20	(Netherlands)	Lauri Weijkamp	21	2	0	0	21	2	3rd	Academy	1 April 2016
26	(Netherlands)	Jeslin Niens	13	0	0	0	13	0	2nd	Academy	18 November 2016
29	(Netherlands)	Kely Pruim	1	0	0	0	1	0	1st	Academy	1 September 2017
33	(Netherlands)	Leonie Vliek	3	0	0	0	3	0	1st	Academy	12 May 2018
35	(Netherlands)	Celien Tiemens	0	0	0	0	0	0	1st	Academy	–
Forwards
7	(Netherlands)	Esmee de Graaf	24	8	1	0	25	8	3rd	(Netherlands) SV Saestum	21 August 2015
9	(Netherlands)	Rebecca Doejaaren	20	2	1	0	21	2	4th	Academy	20 February 2015
11	(Netherlands)	Maxime Bennink	24	5	1	0	25	5	2nd	(Netherlands) FC Twente	19 September 2016
30	(Netherlands)	Amy Banarsie	1	0	0	0	1	0	3rd	Academy	13 May 2016
No.	Nat.	Name	G	Goal	G	Goal	G	Goal	Season	Signed from	Debut
No.	Nat.	Name	Eredivisie		KNVB Cup		Total		Season	Signed from	Debut

== Transfers ==
=== In ===
#	Nat.	Name	From	Type	Date	Fee
18	(Netherlands)	Maud Asbroek	Academy	Free	–	–
22	(Croatia)	Stephanie Bukovec	(Sweden) Töcksfors IF	Free	30 June 2018	–
24	(England)	Abby Holmes	(England) Sunderland A.F.C.	Free	30 June 2018	–
13	(United States)	Siobhan McDonough	(United States) Boston Breakers	Free	30 June 2018	–
10	(Netherlands)	Babiche Roof	(Netherlands) Telstar	Free	–	–
14	(United States)	Marlo Sweatman	(Sweden) Töcksfors IF	Free	30 June 2018	–
20	(Netherlands)	Lauri Weijkamp	Academy	Free	–	–

=== Out ===
#	Nat.	Name	To	Type	Fee	G	Goal
4	(Netherlands)	Kirsten Bakker	Unknown	Free	–	40	1
22	(Netherlands)	Lydia Borg	Unknown	Free	–	67	0
24	(Netherlands)	Marije van Dam	Unknown	Free	–	43	0
10	(Netherlands)	Judith Frijlink	Retired	–	–	151	40
20	(Netherlands)	Angenita Lemstra	Unknown	Free	–	7	0
14	(Netherlands)	Kyra Scheggetmann	Unknown	Free	–	84	0
5	(Netherlands)	Anouk van Vilsteren	Unknown	Free	–	74	4
