= 2020–21 Eredivisie (women) =

Summary of Dutch women's soccer season

Eredivisie Vrouwen
- Season: 2020–21
- Dates: 6 September 2020 – 30 May 2021
- Champions: Twente
- UEFA Women's Champions League: Twente; PSV
- Matches: 80
- Goals: 270 (3.38 per match)
- Top goalscorer: Joëlle Smits (23 goals)
- Biggest home win: Twente 9–0 Alkmaar (21 March 2021)
- Biggest away win: Excelsior 0–6 PSV(1 November 2020)
- Highest scoring: Twente 9–0 Alkmaar (21 March 2021)
- Longest winning run: 7 matches Ajax
- Longest unbeaten run: 15 matches Twente
- Longest winless run: 10 matches Alkmaar
- Longest losing run: 5 matches ADO Den Haag; Alkmaar

The 2020–21 Eredivisie Vrouwen was the eleventh season of the Netherlands women's top professional football league. FC Twente, the reigning champions from the 2018-19 season, repeated as champions.

== Format ==
The league had a split-season format. The regular season had a double round robin schedule, with each team playing the other seven teams twice, once at home and once away, for a total of 14 matches each. After that, the top four teams qualified for a championship playoff, and the bottom four teams played a placement playoff. Each group also played a double round robin format, with each team playing the three other teams in its cohort twice, for a total of 6 matches each. Points accumulated in the regular season were halved and added to the points of the playoff stage rounds for the final standings. There was neither relegation nor promotion, and the top two teams qualified for the 2021–22 UEFA Women's Champions League.

== Teams ==
Location of teams in the Eredivisie Vrouwen 2020–21

All eight teams from the previous season returned. Excelsior ended its initial three-year partnership with Barendrecht, dropping the latter club's name.

Team	City / Town	Venue(s)	Capacity
ADO Den Haag	Den Haag	Cars Jeans Stadion	15,000
AFC Ajax	Amsterdam	Sportpark De Toekomst	5,000
VV Alkmaar	Alkmaar	Sportpark AFC '34	2,500
Excelsior	Rotterdam	Van Donge & De Roo Stadion	4,500
SC Heerenveen	Heerenveen	Sportpark Skoatterwâld	3,000
SC Heerenveen	Heerenveen	Sportcomplex Nieuwehorne (Nieuwehorne)	1,000
PEC Zwolle	Zwolle	MAC³PARK Stadion	14,000
PEC Zwolle	Zwolle	Sportpark Be Quick '28	3,000
PSV Eindhoven	Eindhoven	Phillips Stadion	35,119
PSV Eindhoven	Eindhoven	Sportcomplex De Herdgang	2,500
FC Twente	Enschede	De Grolsch Veste	30,205
FC Twente	Enschede	Sportpark Het Diekman	4,000

Source: Soccerway, Football Reference

== Regular season ==
=== Standings ===
Pos	Team	Pld	W	D	L	GF	GA	GD	Pts	Qualification
1	Twente	14	10	2	2	46	14	+32	32	Qualification to Championship play-off
2	PSV	14	10	1	3	33	14	+19	31	Qualification to Championship play-off
3	Ajax	14	10	1	3	28	10	+18	31	Qualification to Championship play-off
4	ADO Den Haag	14	5	5	4	21	16	+5	20	Qualification to Championship play-off
5	PEC Zwolle	14	4	4	6	16	24	−8	16	Qualification to Placement play-off
6	Heerenveen	14	3	3	8	21	30	−9	12	Qualification to Placement play-off
7	Alkmaar	14	2	3	9	15	41	−26	9	Qualification to Placement play-off
8	Excelsior	14	1	3	10	8	39	−31	6	Qualification to Placement play-off

Source: Soccerway
Rules for classification: Season in progress: 1) Most points won; 2) Less points lost; 3) Goal difference; 4) Goals scored; 5) Alphabetical order; End of season: 1) Points; 2) Goal difference; 3) Goals scored; 4) Head-to-head points; 5) Head-to-head goal difference; 6) Head-to-head away goals scored; 7) Play-off if relevant for deciding champion, relegation or participating in a European league, otherwise by draw. 8) Penalty shoot-out (only after a play-off)

=== Results ===
Home \ Away	ADO	AJA	ALK	EXC	HEE	PEC	PSV	TWE
ADO Den Haag		0–3	2–2	1–0	3–1	3–0	1–1	0–0
Ajax	1–0		1–0	1–0	1–1	0–1	2–0	3–1
Alkmaar	1–4	0–4		1–1	4–3	0–3	1–2	0–4
Excelsior	2–2	1–4	0–3		0–2	2–1	0–6	0–3
Heerenveen	3–3	1–2	3–2	3–0		0–1	1–2	2–6
PEC Zwolle	1–0	1–4	0–0	2–2	1–1		0–1	1–4
PSV	1–0	2–1	5–1	3–0	2–0	5–2		1–2
Twente	0–2	2–1	9–0	7–0	3–0	2–2	3–2	

Source: Soccerway
Legend: Blue = home team win; Yellow = draw; Red = away team win.

== Playoffs ==
=== Championship playoffs ===
==== Standings ====
Pos	Team	Pld	W	D	L	GF	GA	GD	SP	Pts	Qualification
1	Twente (C)	6	4	1	1	8	5	+3	16	29	UEFA Champions League first round
2	PSV	6	4	0	2	16	9	+7	16	28	UEFA Champions League first round
3	Ajax	6	3	0	3	12	11	+1	16	25	
4	ADO Den Haag	6	0	1	5	6	17	−11	10	11	

Source: Soccerway
Rules for classification: Season in progress: 1) Most points won; 2) Less points lost; 3) Goal difference; 4) Goals scored; 5) Alphabetical order; End of season: 1) Points; 2) Goal difference; 3) Goals scored; 4) Head-to-head points; 5) Head-to-head goal difference; 6) Head-to-head away goals scored; 7) Play-off if relevant for deciding champion, relegation or participating in a European league, otherwise by draw. 8) Penalty shoot-out (only after a play-off)
(C) Champions

==== Results ====
Home \ Away	ADO	AJA	PSV	TWE
ADO Den Haag		3–5	0–2	1–1
Ajax	2–0		3–2	1–2
PSV	6–2	3–1		2–1
Twente	1–0	1–0	2–1	

Source: Soccerway
Legend: Blue = home team win; Yellow = draw; Red = away team win.

=== Placement playoffs ===
==== Standings ====
Pos	Team	Pld	W	D	L	GF	GA	GD	SP	Pts
1	Heerenveen	6	3	3	0	11	8	+3	6	18
2	PEC Zwolle	6	2	3	1	12	7	+5	8	17
3	Excelsior	6	1	3	2	7	9	−2	3	9
4	Alkmaar	6	0	3	3	10	16	−6	5	8

Source: Soccerway
Rules for classification: Season in progress: 1) Most points won; 2) Less points lost; 3) Goal difference; 4) Goals scored; 5) Alphabetical order; End of season: 1) Points; 2) Goal difference; 3) Goals scored; 4) Head-to-head points; 5) Head-to-head goal difference; 6) Head-to-head away goals scored; 7) Play-off if relevant for deciding champion, relegation or participating in a European league, otherwise by draw. 8) Penalty shoot-out (only after a play-off)

==== Results ====
Home \ Away	ALK	EXC	HEE	PEC
Alkmaar		0–0	3–3	3–3
Excelsior	3–2		2–3	1–1
Heerenveen	2–1	1–1		1–0
PEC Zwolle	5–1	2–0	1–1	

Source: Soccerway
Legend: Blue = home team win; Yellow = draw; Red = away team win.

== Statistics ==
=== Top scorers ===
Rank	Player	Club	Games	Goal	Penalty scored	avg.
1.	(Netherlands) Joëlle Smits	PSV	18	23	4	1.28
2.	(Netherlands) Renate Jansen	Twente	20	12	0	0.6
3.	(Netherlands) Fenna Kalma	Twente	20	11	1	0.55
4.	(Germany) Anna-Lena Stolze	Twente	18	10	0	0.56
5.	(Netherlands) Nikita Tromp	Ajax	19	9	2	0.47
6.	(Netherlands) Nikée van Dijk	sc Heerenveen	15	7	0	0.47
6.	(Netherlands) Jaimy Ravensbergen	ADO Den Haag	17	7	0	0.41
8.	(Netherlands) Vanity Lewerissa	Ajax	12	6	0	0.5
8.	(Netherlands) Marjolijn van den Bighelaar	Ajax	14	6	2	0.43
8.	(Netherlands) Chimera Ripa	VV Alkmaar	19	6	0	0.32
8.	(Netherlands) Kirsten van de Westeringh	sc Heerenveen	19	6	0	0.32
8.	(Netherlands) Sanne Koopman	VV Alkmaar	19	6	0	0.32
8.	(Netherlands) Dominique Bruinenberg	PEC Zwolle	19	6	3	0.32

Source: Soccerway

=== Hat-tricks(+) ===
Rnd	Player	Club	Goals	Date	Home	Score	Away
5	(Netherlands) Joëlle Smits	PSV	31', 40', 43'	1 Nov 2020	Excelsior	0 – 6	PSV
5	(Netherlands) Kayleigh van Dooren	PSV	68', 78', 90'	1 Nov 2020	Excelsior	0 – 6	PSV
12	(Netherlands) Fenna Kalma	Twente	55', 65', 69'	12 Mar 2021	Heerenveen	2 – 6	Twente
13	(Germany) Anna-Lena Stolze	Twente	1', 26', 38', 47', 51'	21 Mar 2021	Twente	9 – 0	Alkmaar
4 PO	(Netherlands) Joëlle Smits	PSV	32', 45+3', 78'	14 May 2021	PSV	6 – 2	ADO Den Haag
