= Bo op de Weegh =

Dutch footballer (born 2005)

Personal information
- Full name: Bo Anna op de Weegh
- Date of birth: 9 February 2005 (age 21)
- Place of birth: Amsterdam, Netherlands
- Position: Forward

Youth career
- VV Kolping Boys
- CSV Jong Holland
- RKVV DSS
- AFC '34
- VV Alkmaar

Senior career*
Years	Team	Apps	(Gls)
2023	VV Alkmaar	5	(0)
2023–2026	AZ	35	(3)
Total		40	(3)

International career
2021	Netherlands U16	3	(0)
2021	Netherlands U17	2	(1)
- * Club domestic league appearances and goals

Bo Anna op de Weegh (born 9 February 2005) is a Dutch former footballer who played as a forward. She played for VV Alkmaar and AZ during her club career and represented the Netherlands at youth international level.

== Club career ==
Op de Weegh was part of the youth talent squad of VV Alkmaar in the 2022–23 season. She made her professional debut for the club on 27 January 2023, coming on as an 83rd-minute substitute for Veerle van der Most in a 2–1 league win against Excelsior.

Op de Weegh moved to AZ Alkmaar on 14 June 2023. She made her debut for the club on 8 September of that year in a 1–1 draw against Excelsior. She signed a contract extension on 11 April 2024, keeping her at AZ until 2025.

On 13 May 2025, op de Weegh extended her contract with AZ until June 2027. Four days later, on 17 May, she suffered a cruciate ligament injury during a match against Twente. After missing the entire 2025–26 season due to the injury, she retired from football on 22 May 2026.

== International career ==
Op de Weegh played for Netherlands U16 team in July 2021 making three appearances for the team during the Nordic Tournament of that year.

== Career statistics ==
Appearances and goals by club, season and competition
Club	Season	League			KNVB Women's Cup		Total	
Club	Season	Division	Apps	Goals	Apps	Goals	Apps	Goals
VV Alkmaar	2022–23	Vrouwen Eredivisie	5	0	2	0	7	0
AZ	2023–24	Vrouwen Eredivisie	18	0	1	0	19	0
AZ	2024–25	Vrouwen Eredivisie	17	3	2	0	19	3
AZ	2025–26	Vrouwen Eredivisie	0	0	0	0	0	0
AZ	Total		35	3	3	0	38	3
Career total			40	3	5	0	45	3
