= Oudehorne =

Oudehorne Aldehoarne
- Village
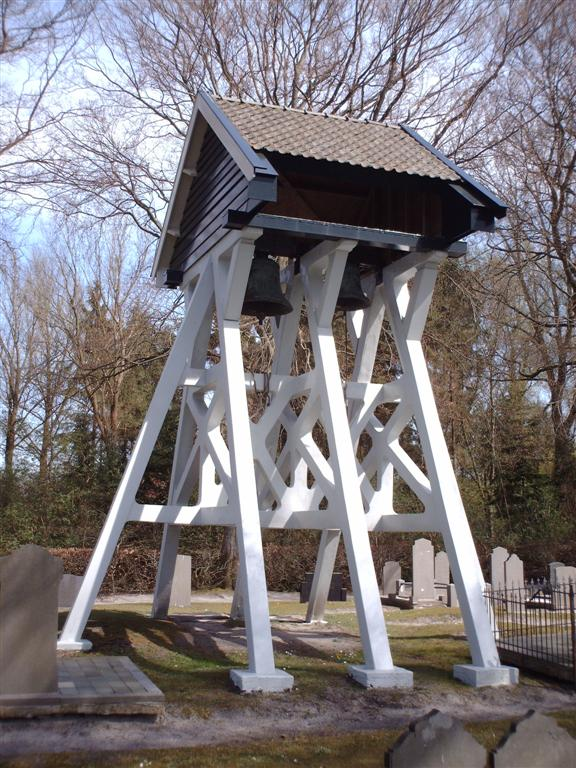
- Oudehorne belfry

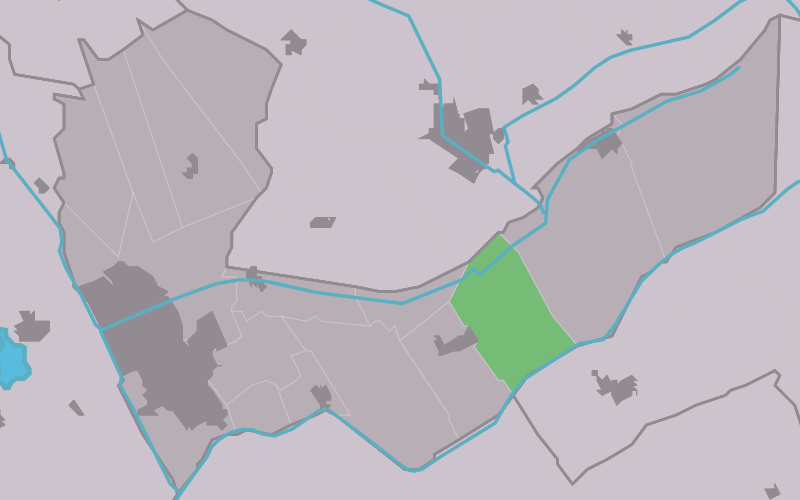
- Location in the Heerenveen municipality

- Location in the Netherlands Oudehorne (Netherlands)
- Country: Netherlands
- Province: Friesland
- Municipality: Heerenveen

Area
  - Total: 9.33 km^{2} (3.60 sq mi)
- Elevation: 3 m (9.8 ft)

Population (2021)
  - Total: 800
  - Density: 86/km^{2} (220/sq mi)
- Time zone: UTC+1 (CET)
  - Summer (DST): UTC+2 (CEST)
- Postal code: 8413
- Dialing code: 0513

Oudehorne (West Frisian: Aldehoarne) is a village in Heerenveen in the province of Friesland, the Netherlands. It had a population of around 835 in January 2017.

== History ==
The village was first mentioned in 1315 as Hoerna cum duabus capellis, and means "corner of a dike". Oude (old) was added to distinguish with Nieuwehorne. Both villages have grown together, but are still considered separate entities. Oudehorne used to have a church, but it had become derelict, and in 1775, the church of Nieuwehorne was used instead. The church was demolished in 1788. The bell tower has remained. In 1840, Oudehorne was home to 152 people.

Before 1934, Oudehorne was part of the Schoterland municipality.

== Gallery ==
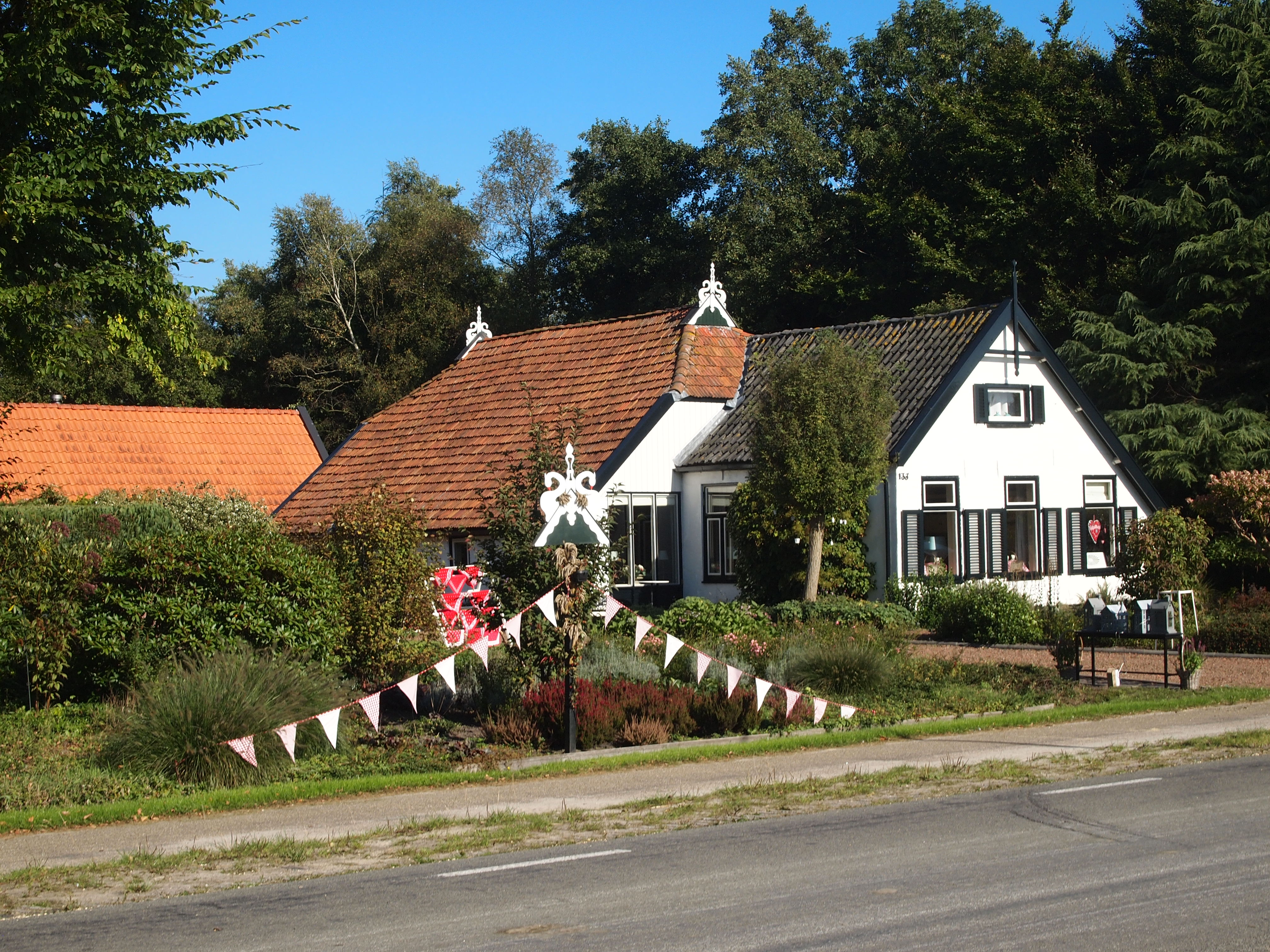
Farm in Oudehorne

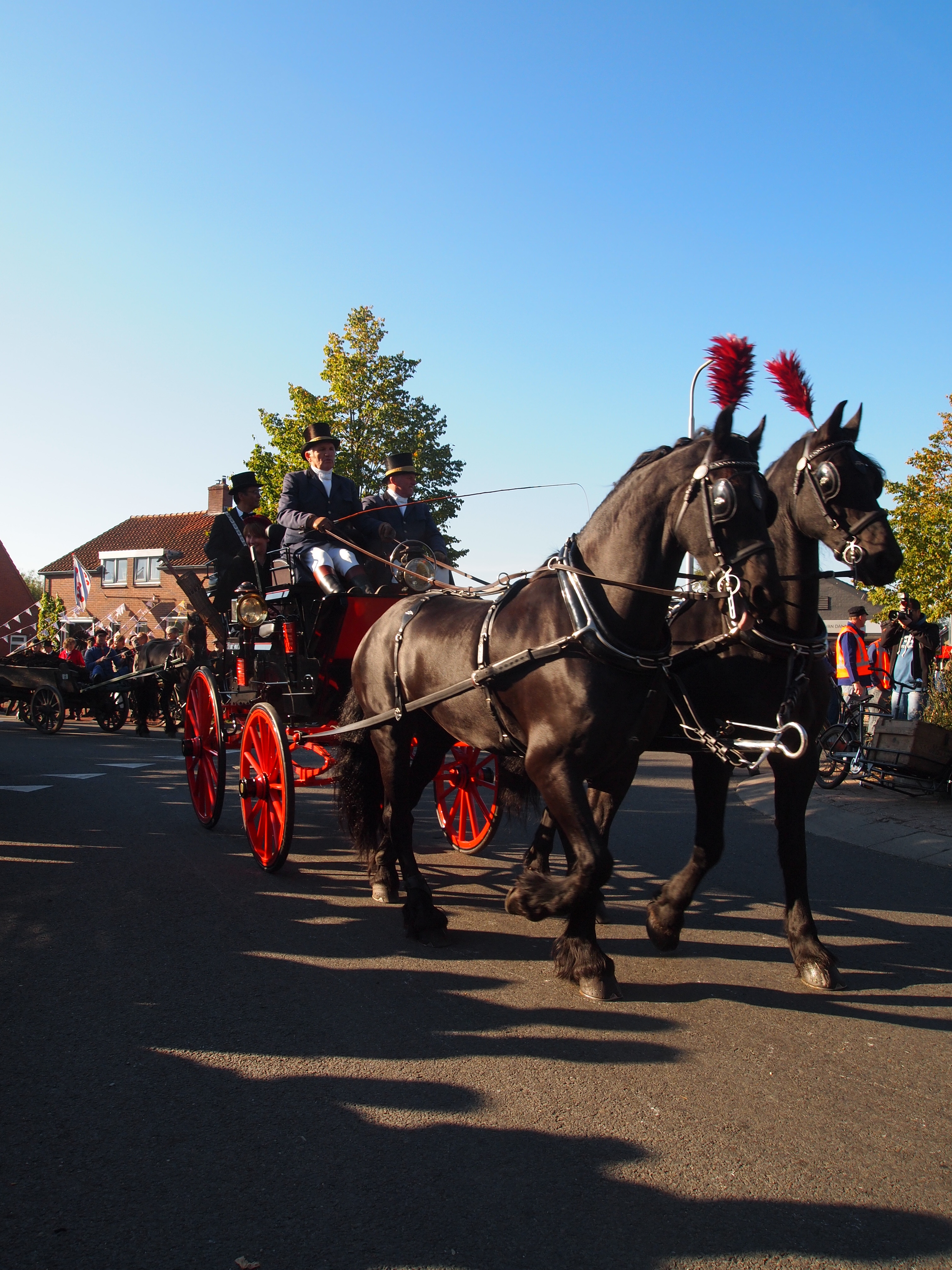
Frisian horses in Oudehorne

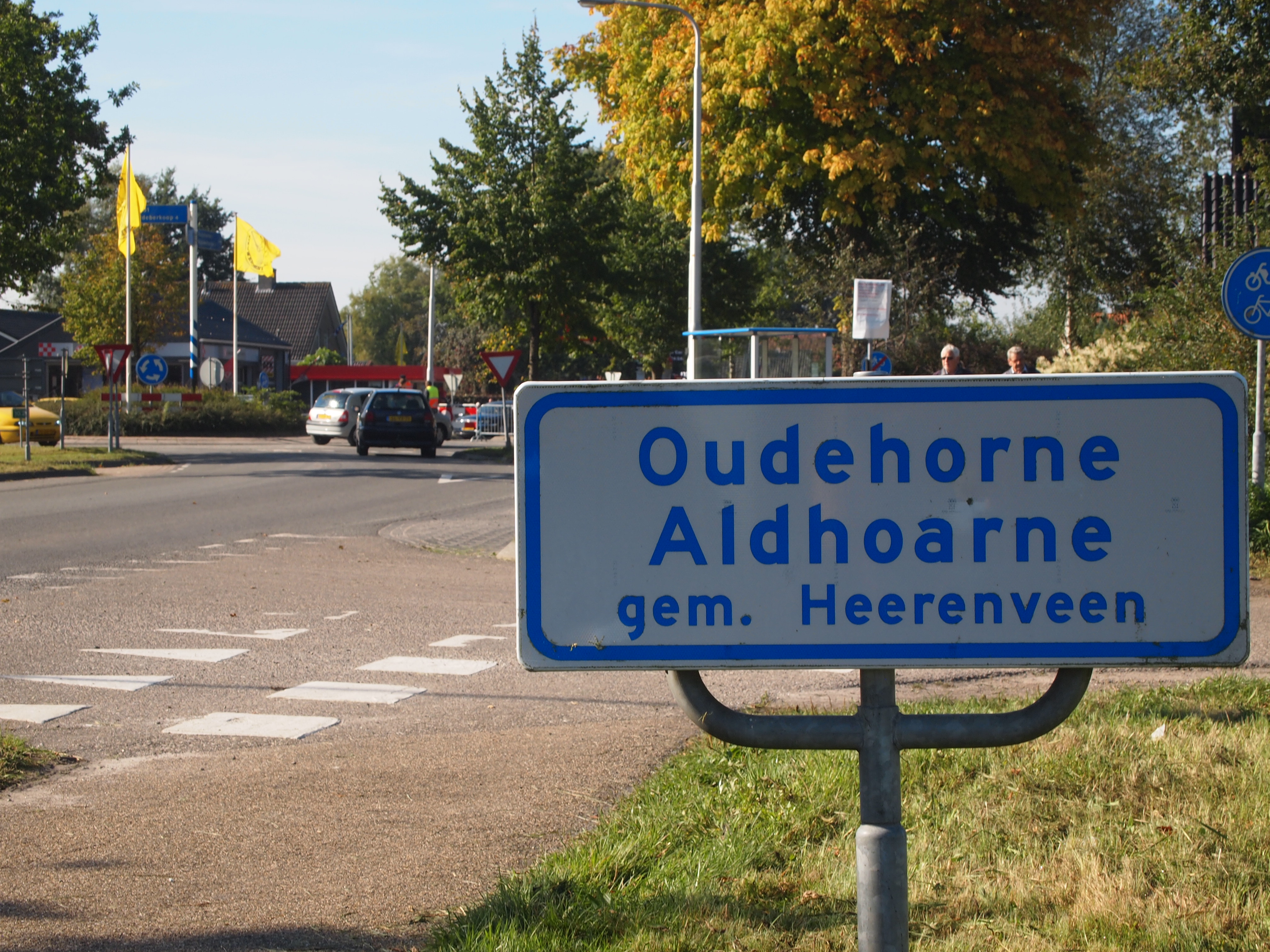
Welcome to Oudehorne

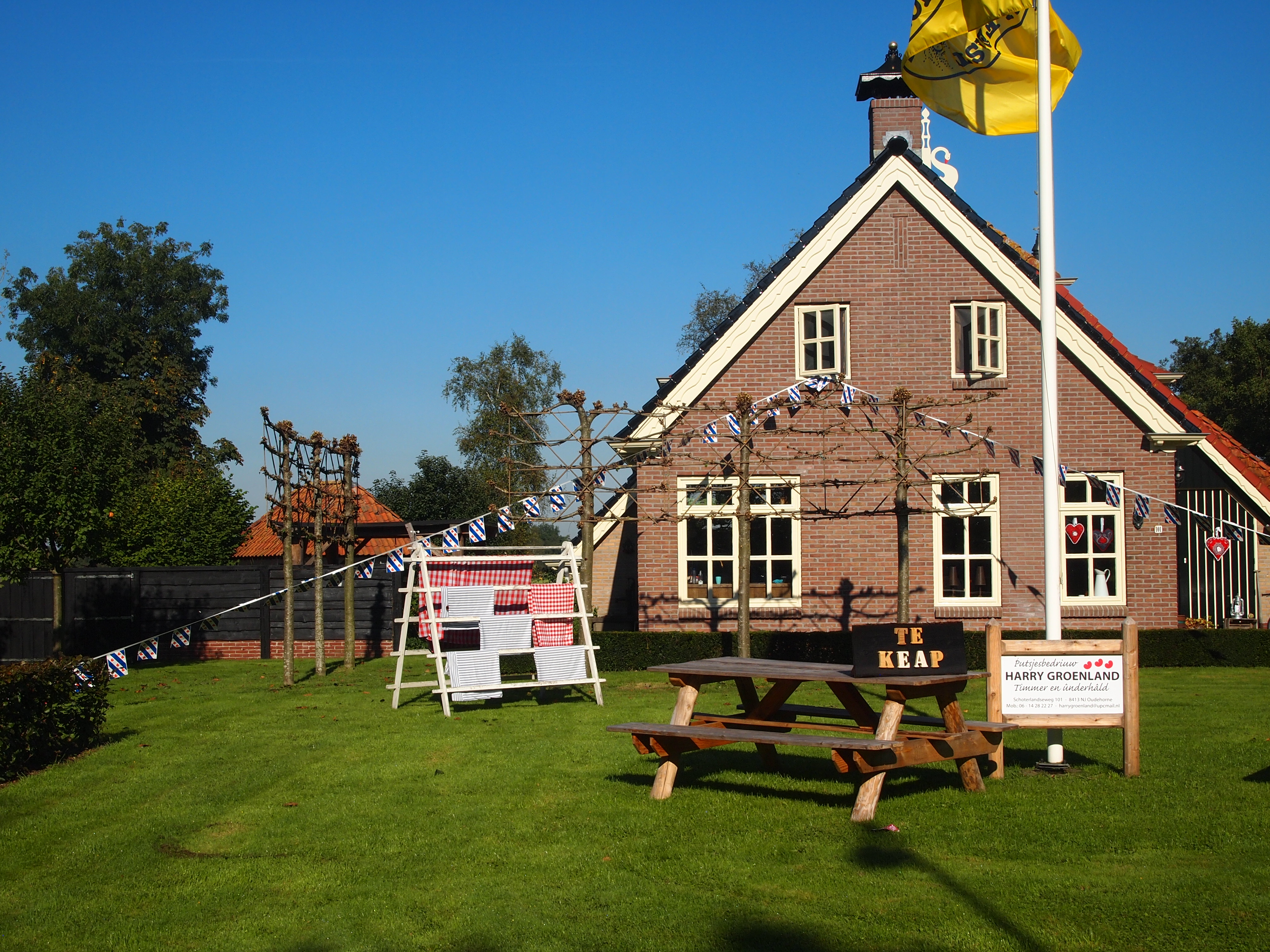
House in Oudehorne
