= 2019–20 Eredivisie (women) =

Eredivisie Vrouwen
- Season: 2019–20
- Dates: 23 August 2019 – 25 February 2020
- UEFA Women's Champions League: PSV Eindhoven; AFC Ajax
- Matches: 48
- Goals: 168 (3.5 per match)
- Biggest home win: PSV 9–1 Excelsior/Barendrecht (27 September 2019)
- Biggest away win: PEC Zwolle 0–4 PSV (22 November 2019); Excelsior/Barendrecht 1–5 PSV (14 February 2020)
- Highest scoring: PSV 9–1 Excelsior/Barendrecht (27 September 2019)
- Longest winning run: 5 matches Ajax
- Longest unbeaten run: 12 matches PSV
- Longest winless run: 12 matches Excelsior/Barendrecht
- Longest losing run: 6 matches Excelsior/Barendrecht
- All statistics correct as of 25 February 2020.

The 2019–20 Eredivisie Vrouwen is the tenth season of the Netherlands women's professional football league. The season was intended to last from 23 August 2019 to 22 May 2020, but was suspended due to the COVID-19 pandemic. Twente began the season as defending champion, and no new champion was crowned.

== Effects of the COVID-19 pandemic ==
On 12 March 2020, all football leagues were suspended until 31 March, as the Dutch government forbade events due to the COVID-19 pandemic. On 15 March, the suspension was extended until 6 April. On 23 March, the Dutch government forbid all gatherings and events until 1 June 2020.

The Dutch government announced on 21 April that all events, subject to authorization, would remain forbidden until 1 September. The KNVB announced the same day its intention not to continue all remaining suspended competitions. A final decision would be taken after consultation with the UEFA and then the consequences would be discussed with the clubs involved.

On 22 April, the KNVB cancelled the season. Two days later, it announced that it would not name a champion for the season and that the top two teams at the time play was halted, PSV and AFC Ajax, would qualify for the UEFA Women's Champions League.

== Format ==
The league had a split-season schedule but was suspended before the end of the regular season. As originally scheduled, in the regular season, all eight teams were to play each other twice, once at home and once away, for 14 matches each. The season was cancelled after each team had played 12 matches.

After the regular season, the top four team would advance to the championship play-off, and the bottom four teams play a placement playoff. In each playoff, teams played each other twice for six matches each. There is no relegation nor promotion in the league, and the champion and runner-up qualify for the 2020–21 UEFA Women's Champions League.

== Teams ==
Location of teams in the Eredivisie 2019–20

The league fielded eight teams, one fewer than the previous season. Achilles '29 announced in April 2019 that it would discontinue its women's team due to financial difficulties.

Team	City / Town	Venue(s)	Capacity
ADO Den Haag	Den Haag	Cars Jeans Stadion	15,000
ADO Den Haag	Den Haag	Sportpark Nieuw Hanenburg	2,500
AFC Ajax	Amsterdam	Sportpark De Toekomst	5,000
VV Alkmaar	Alkmaar	Rabobank IJmond Stadion (Velsen)	4,663
VV Alkmaar	Alkmaar	Sportpark AFC '34	2,500
VV Alkmaar	Alkmaar	Sportpark De Wending (Heerhugowaard)	1,000
VV Alkmaar	Alkmaar	AFAS Trainingscomplex (Wormerland)	2,383
Excelsior/Barendrecht	Rotterdam	Van Donge & De Roo Stadion	4,500
Excelsior/Barendrecht	Rotterdam	Sportpark De Bongerd (Barendrecht)	2,100
SC Heerenveen	Heerenveen	Sportpark Skoatterwâld	3,000
SC Heerenveen	Heerenveen	Zuidersportpark (Sneek)	3,150
PEC Zwolle	Zwolle	MAC³PARK Stadion	14,000
PEC Zwolle	Zwolle	Sportpark Ceintuurbaan	3,000
PSV Eindhoven	Eindhoven	Jan Louwers Stadion	5,400
PSV Eindhoven	Eindhoven	Sportcomplex De Herdgang	2,500
FC Twente	Enschede	De Grolsch Veste	30,205
FC Twente	Enschede	Sportpark Slangenbeek (Hengelo)	2,000
FC Twente	Enschede	FC Twente-trainingscentrum (Hengelo)	1,000

Source: Soccerway

== Regular season ==
=== Standings ===
>> Below is the standings as of 25 February 2020, the date the last matches were played. <<

Pos	Team	Pld	W	D	L	GF	GA	GD	Pts	Qualification or relegation
1	PSV	12	10	2	0	42	8	+34	32	Qualification to UEFA Women's Champions League
2	Ajax	12	8	1	3	22	11	+11	25	Qualification to UEFA Women's Champions League
3	Twente	12	7	2	3	28	15	+13	23	~~Qualification to Championship play-off~~
4	Heerenveen	12	5	3	4	18	17	+1	18	~~Qualification to Championship play-off~~
5	ADO Den Haag	12	3	3	6	12	16	−4	12	~~Qualification to Placement play-off~~
6	Alkmaar	12	2	4	6	19	29	−10	10	~~Qualification to Placement play-off~~
7	PEC Zwolle	12	2	4	6	17	32	−15	10	~~Qualification to Placement play-off~~
8	Excelsior/Barendrecht	12	0	3	9	10	40	−30	3	~~Qualification to Placement play-off~~

Source: Soccerway
Rules for classification: Season in progress: 1) Most points won; 2) Less points lost; 3) Goal difference; 4) Goals scored; 5) Alphabetical order; End of season: 1) Points; 2) Goal difference; 3) Goals scored; 4) Head-to-head points; 5) Head-to-head goal difference; 6) Head-to-head away goals scored; 7) Play-off if relevant for deciding champion, relegation or participating in a European league, otherwise by draw. 8) Penalty shoot-out (only after a play-off)

=== Fixtures/results ===
Home \ Away	ADO	AJA	ALK	EXC	HEE	PEC	PSV	TWE
ADO Den Haag		1–0	~~20 Mar~~	0–0	1–2	1–2	0–1	0–1
Ajax	1–0		4–0	~~27 Mar~~	0–0	4–0	1–4	2–1
Alkmaar	1–1	1–2		4–0	3–2	2–2	~~27 Mar~~	0–2
Excelsior/Barendrecht	1–3	0–2	3–3		0–2	~~20 Mar~~	1–5	2–4
Heerenveen	~~27 Mar~~	0–1	3–1	2–0		1–0	1–4	1–3
PEC Zwolle	2–4	2–4	2–1	2–2	3–3		0–4	~~27 Mar~~
PSV	1–1	~~20 Mar~~	5–0	9–1	1–1	4–0		1–0
Twente	4–0	2–1	3–3	4–0	~~20 Mar~~	2–2	2–3	

Source: Soccerway
Legend: Blue = home team win; Yellow = draw; Red = away team win.

== Top scorers ==
As of matches played on 25 February 2020.

Rank	Player	Club	Goals
1	(Netherlands) Joëlle Smits	PSV	16
2	(Netherlands) Katja Snoeijs	PSV	13
3	(Netherlands) Fenna Kalma	FC Twente	9
3	(Netherlands) Marjolijn van den Bighelaar	AFC Ajax	9
5	(Netherlands) Renate Jansen	FC Twente	8
6	(Netherlands) Nikita Tromp	PEC Zwolle	5
7	(Netherlands) Seven players tied		4
