= Femke Liefting =

Dutch footballer (born 2005)

Personal information
- Date of birth: 2 January 2005 (age 21)
- Place of birth: Uitgeest, Netherlands
- Height: 1.79 m (5 ft 10 in)
- Position: Goalkeeper

Team information
- Current team: Ajax (on loan from Chelsea)

Youth career
- FC Uitgeest
- 2016–2018: Telstar
- 2018–2021: VV Alkmaar

Senior career*
| Years | Team | Apps | (Gls) |
| 2021–2023 | VV Alkmaar | 19 | (0) |
| 2023–2025 | AZ | 32 | (0) |
| 2025– | Chelsea | 0 | (0) |
| 2025–2026 | → Newcastle United (loan) | 7 | (0) |
| 2026– | → Ajax (loan) | 0 | (0) |

International career^{‡}
| 2021 | Netherlands U16 | 1 | (0) |
| 2021–2022 | Netherlands U17 | 7 | (0) |
| 2022–2024 | Netherlands U19 | 26 | (0) |
| 2024 | Netherlands U20 | 9 | (0) |
| 2025– | Netherlands U23 | 1 | (0) |
- * Club domestic league appearances and goals as of 12 December 2025 ‡ National team caps and goals as of 23 October 2025

Femke Liefting (Dutch: [ˈfɛmkə ˈliftɪŋ]; born 2 January 2005) is a Dutch professional footballer who plays as a goalkeeper for Vrouwen Eredivisie club Ajax, on loan from Women's Super League club Chelsea.

== Club career ==
Liefting started her youth career with FC Uitgeest and joined the youth academy of Telstar at the age of 11. She moved to VV Alkmaar two years later. On 18 April 2024, she signed a two-year contract extension with VV Alkmaar until June 2026.

On 31 January 2025, Liefting joined Women's Super League (WSL) club Chelsea on a three-and-a-half-year deal. On 4 September, she joined WSL 2 side Newcastle United, on loan for the 2025–26 season.

On 17 July 2026, Liefting joined Vrouwen Eredivisie club Ajax on a season long loan.

== International career ==
In October 2024, Liefting received her first call-up to the Netherlands national team for friendly matches against Indonesia and Denmark.

== Honours ==
Individual

- FIFA U-20 Women's World Cup Golden Glove: 2024

Chelsea

- FA Women's League Cup: 2024–25
