= Floor Spaan =

Dutch footballer (born 2003)

Personal information
- Full name: Floor Jolijn Spaan
- Date of birth: 10 May 2003 (age 23)
- Place of birth: Broek in Waterland, Netherlands
- Position: Forward

Youth career
- SDOB
- RKAV Volendam
- 2018–2020: SV Kadoelen
- 2020–2022: Telstar Reserves

Senior career*
Years	Team	Apps	(Gls)
2022–2023	VV Alkmaar	14	(0)
2023–2025	AZ	51	(16)
- * Club domestic league appearances and goals as of 00:28, 25 December 2025 (UTC)

Floor Jolijn Spaan (born 10 May 2003) is a Dutch former professional footballer who plays as a forward. She has previously played in the Eredivisie for VV Alkmaar and AZ.

== Early life ==
Spaan was born in Broek in Waterland, where she grew up in a family full of football-geared individuals. Spaan herself began playing the sport at the age of 5, first joining SDOB before enjoying a brief spell with RKAV Volendam. She often played on boys teams and also participated in indoor soccer. Spaan then played for SV Kadoelen from 2018 to 2020, where she won a Dutch championship with the club.

In May 2020, she moved to the Telstar reserve team. While Spaan had moved up the ranks of the Dutch football system as a midfielder, she played primarily as a striker with Telstar due to an overabundance of midfielders in the squad. Spaan initially had trouble adapted to the new position, but she soon adjusted well and scored 12 goals in her second season at Telstar.

== Club career ==
=== VV Alkmaar ===
Spaan joined Eredivisie club VV Alkmaar in 2022. She made her professional debut on 22 September 2022, in an away match versus SC Heerenveen. Despite having ostensibly grown more comfortable with her position on the frontline at Telstar, Spaan had a tough year in front of goal and did not manage to score a goal with her new club. At the end of the season, VV Alkmaar was disbanded and replaced in the Eredivisie by business partners AZ. Spaan had made 14 league appearances for the club.

=== AZ ===
In June 2023, Spaan chose to continue playing in Alkmaar and signed a two-year contract with AZ. On 8 September 2023, she scored her first professional goal in her debut for AZ. On 18 November, Spaan scored 11 seconds into a match against FC Utrecht; her swift strike set the record for fastest goal scored in the Eredivisie. Spaan continued to show quality in front of the net, tallying 11 goals in her first season at AZ and becoming the team's 2023–24 topscorer. However, the team did not have a highly successful season and only won two games in the first half of the campaign. Spaan directly contributed to both victories, scoring in September 2023 to beat Heerenveen and then in the final match before the league's winter break to help produce an upset against Fortuna Sittard. Spaan also later scored against FC Twente on 23 March 2024, contributing to a 2–2 draw in HZ's first AFAS Stadion match in 12 years.

In her second season at AZ, Spaan scored 5 across 22 games, with an additional goal coming in the KNVB Cup. On June 16, 2025, she signed a one-year extension with the club. Once the 2025–26 Eredivisie commenced, Spaan had trouble finding joy in playing football. After not managing to score in any of the first 8 league games of the season, she announced via social media that she would be stepping away from professional football for the foreseeable future.

== Career statistics ==
=== Club ===
As of 24 December 2025

Appearances and goals by club, season and competition
Club	Season	League			Cup (Note: Includes the KNVB Cup)		Total	
Club	Season	Division	Apps	Goals	Apps	Goals	Apps	Goals
VV Alkmaar	2022–23	Eredivisie	14	0	2	0	16	0
AZ Alkmaar	2023–24	Eredivisie	21	11	1	0	22	11
AZ Alkmaar	2024–25	Eredivisie	22	5	2	1	24	6
AZ Alkmaar	2025–26	Eredivisie	8	0	0	0	8	0
AZ Alkmaar	Total		51	16	3	1	54	17
Career total			65	16	5	1	70	17
