= Nieuwehorne =

Nieuwehorne Nijhoarne
- Village
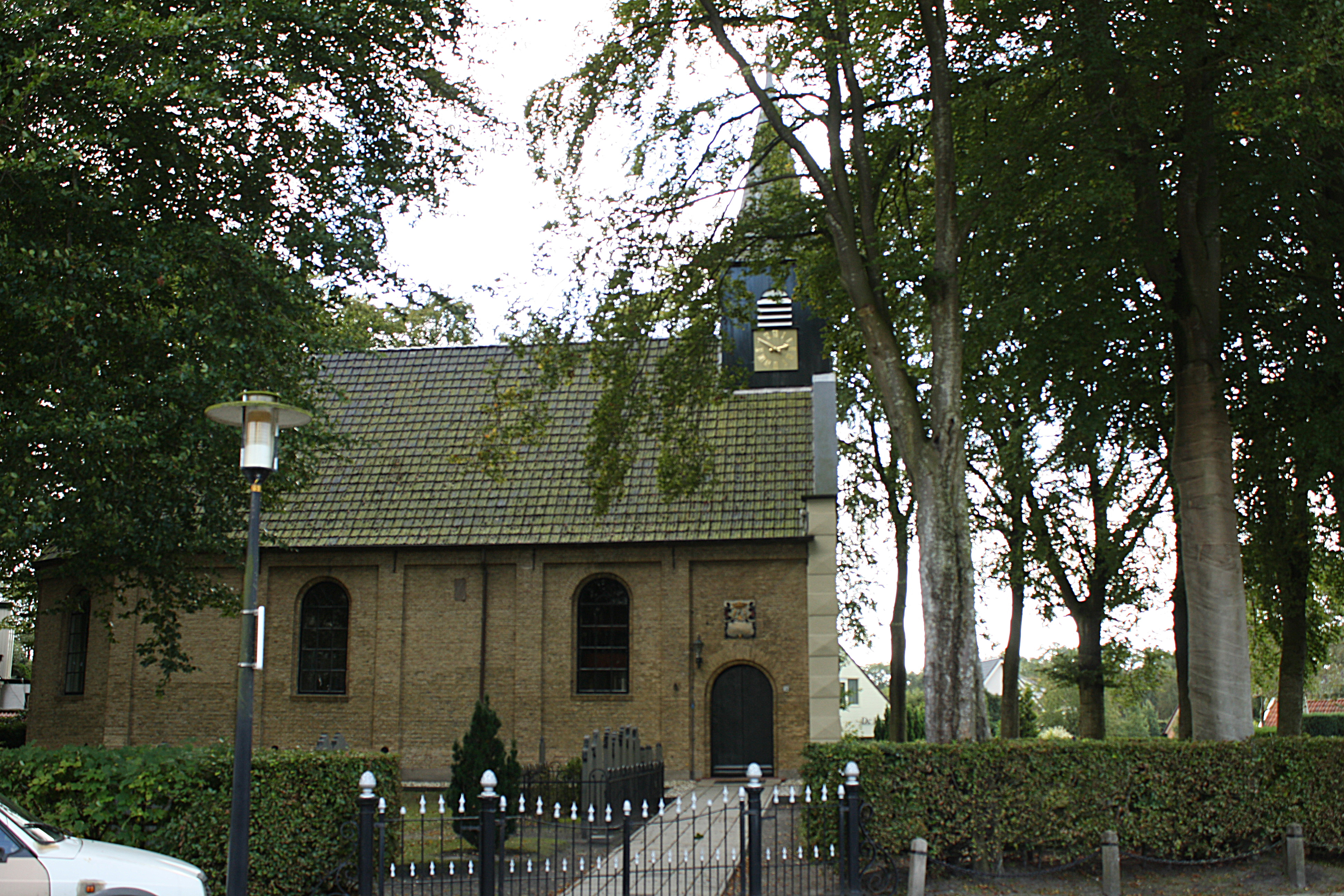
- Nieuwehorne church

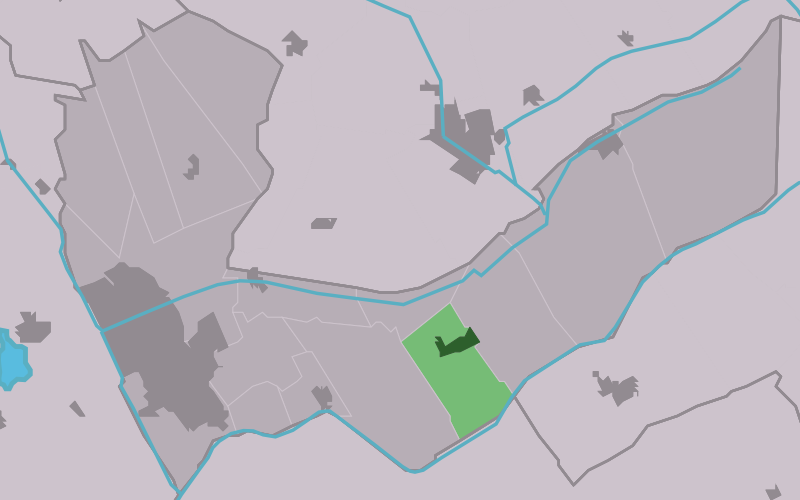
- Location in the Heerenveen municipality

- Location in the Netherlands
- Country: Netherlands
- Province: Friesland
- Municipality: Heerenveen

Area
  - Total: 6.40 km^{2} (2.47 sq mi)
- Elevation: 3 m (9.8 ft)

Population (2021)
  - Total: 1,455
  - Density: 227/km^{2} (589/sq mi)
- Time zone: UTC+1 (CET)
  - Summer (DST): UTC+2 (CEST)
- Postal code: 8414
- Dialing code: 0513

Nieuwehorne (West Frisian: Nijhoarne) is a village in Heerenveen in the province of Friesland, the Netherlands. It had a population of around 1,450 in January 2017.

== History ==
The village was first mentioned in 1315 as Hoerne cum duabus capellis, and means "the new corner of the river". Nieuw (new) has been added to distinguish from Oudehorne. The village developed at an intersection of roads. The Dutch Reformed church dates from 1778 and was restored around 1850. In 1840, Nieuwehorne was home to 293 people.

On the night of 13 to 14 September 1942, an Avro Lancaster of the Royal Air Force carrying a crew of 7 crashed near Nieuwehorne. The crew is buried on the local cemetery and in 1992, a monument was revealed.

Before 1934, Nieuwehorne was part of the Schoterland municipality.

== Gallery ==
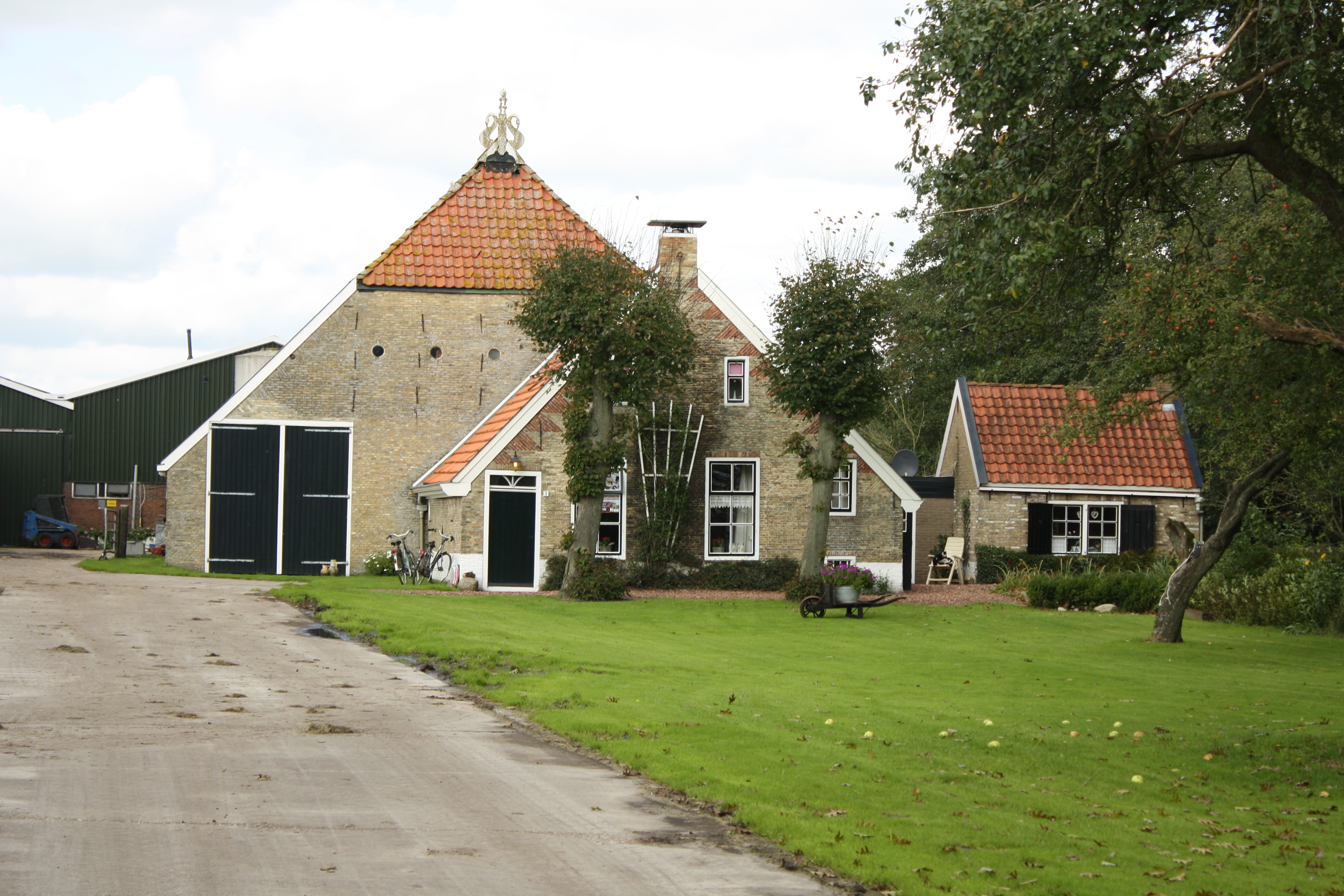
Farm in Nieuwehorne

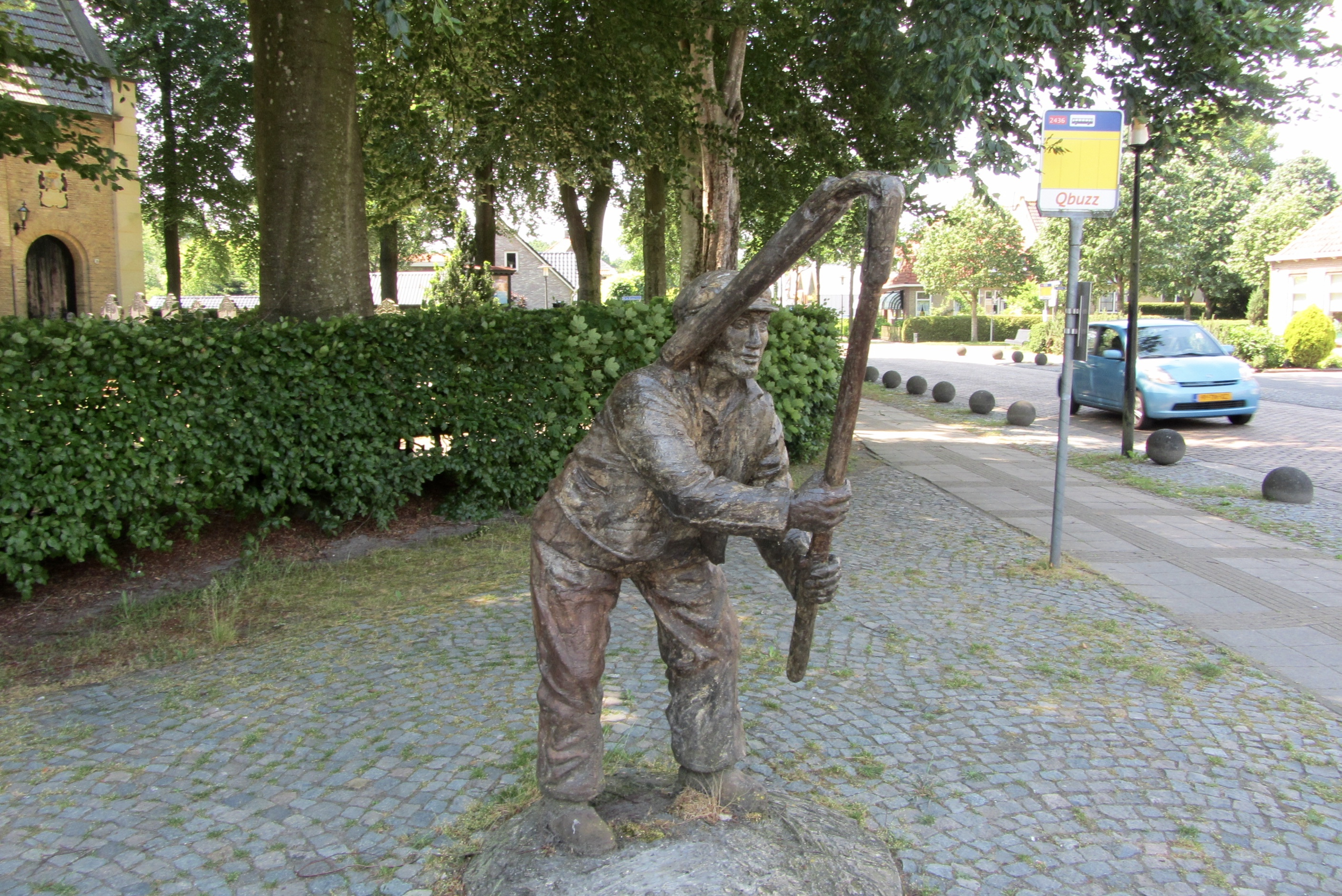
Statue of a man with a flail

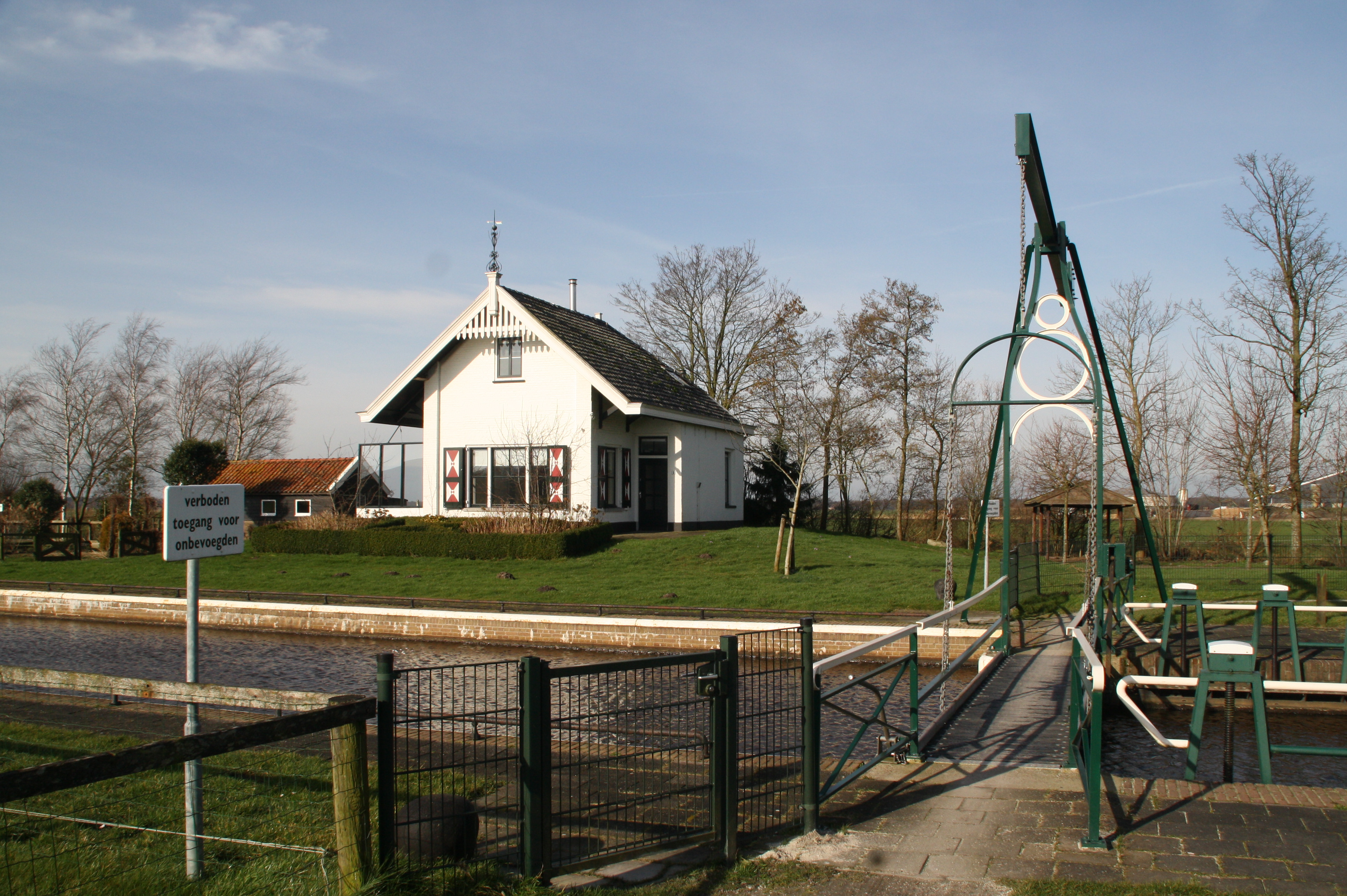
Locks at Nieuwehorne

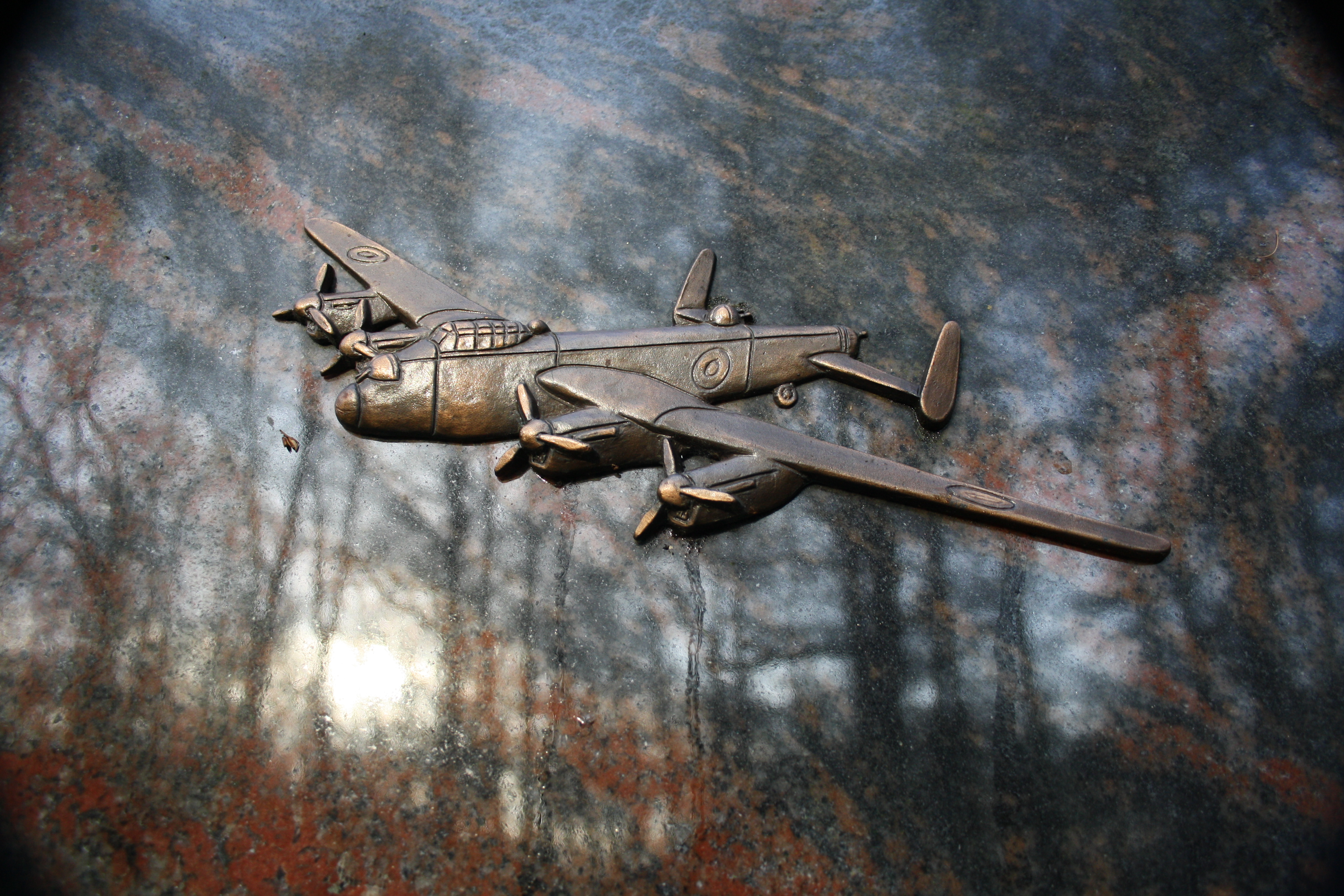
Lancaster monument
