= 2023–24 Eredivisie (women) =

Season of Dutch professional women's football

Eredivisie Vrouwen
- Season: 2023–24
- Dates: 8 September 2023 – 11 May 2024
- Champions: Twente
- Champions League: Twente; Ajax
- Matches: 132
- Goals: 433 (3.28 per match)
- Best Player: (Belgium) Tessa Wullaert
- Top goalscorer: (Belgium) Tessa Wullaert (26 goals)
- Longest winning run: 15 - Twente
- Longest unbeaten run: 15 - Twente
- Longest winless run: 11 - Excelsior
- Longest losing run: 7 - Excelsior
- Highest attendance: 15,000 Ajax v. Feyenoord (10 February 2024)
- Total attendance: 104,954
- All statistics correct as of 11 May 2024.

The 2023–24 Eredivisie Vrouwen, known as Azerion Vrouwen Eredivisie for sponsorship reasons, is the fourteenth season of the Netherlands women's professional football league. Twente won the league title. The season saw FC Utrecht rejoin the league, which expanded to 12 teams. Tessa Wullaert of Fortuna Sittard was the leading goal scorer and was named the player of the year. Lily Yohannes of Ajax received the Talent of the Year award.

== Format ==
Each team played all other teams twice over 22 rounds. Unlike the previous two seasons, one team no longer had a bye each week, since the league had an even number of teams.

== Teams ==
Location of teams in the Eredivisie Vrouwen 2022–23

FC Utrecht joined the league after a 10-year absence, expanding the league to 12 teams. Additionally, AZ took the license of VV Alkmaar.

Team	City / Town	Venue(s)	Capacity
ADO Den Haag	Den Haag	Bingoal Stadion	15,000
Ajax	Amsterdam	Sportpark De Toekomst	5,000
AZ	Alkmaar	AFAS Trainingcomplex	3,000
Excelsior	Rotterdam	Van Donge & De Roo Stadion	4,500
Feyenoord	Rotterdam	Sportcomplex Varkenoord	2,500
Fortuna Sittard	Sittard	Fortuna Sittard Stadion	12,500
sc Heerenveen	Heerenveen	Sportcomplex Nieuwehorne	1,000
sc Heerenveen	Heerenveen	Abe Lenstra Stadion	27,224
sc Heerenveen	Heerenveen	Sportpark Skoatterwâld	3,000
PEC Zwolle	Zwolle	MAC³PARK Stadion	14,000
PEC Zwolle	Zwolle	Sportpark De Vegtlust	3,000
PSV	Eindhoven	Sportcomplex De Herdgang	2,500
PSV	Eindhoven	Philips Stadion	35,119
Telstar	Velsen	711 Stadion	5,200
FC Twente	Enschede	De Grolsch Veste	30,205
FC Twente	Enschede	Sportpark Het Diekman	4,000
FC Twente	Enschede	Sportpark Schreurserve	2,000
FC Utrecht	Utrecht	Stadion Galgenwaard	23,750
FC Utrecht	Utrecht	Sportcomplex Zoudenbalch	1,000
FC Utrecht	Utrecht	Sportpark Elinkwijk	4,000

Source: Football Reference

== Standings ==
Pos	Team	Pld	W	D	L	GF	GA	GD	Pts	Qualification
1	Twente (C)	22	18	2	2	56	21	+35	56	UEFA Champions League first qualifying round
2	Ajax	22	17	3	2	62	20	+42	54	UEFA Champions League first qualifying round
3	PSV	22	12	5	5	52	24	+28	41	
4	Fortuna Sittard	22	12	4	6	57	27	+30	40	
5	ADO Den Haag	22	9	5	8	31	23	+8	32	
6	PEC Zwolle	22	9	4	9	36	41	−5	31	
7	Utrecht	22	8	6	8	34	45	−11	30	
8	Feyenoord	22	7	3	12	26	34	−8	24	
9	AZ	22	5	6	11	28	38	−10	21	
10	Heerenveen	22	5	4	13	15	38	−23	19	
11	Telstar	22	3	3	16	16	69	−53	12	
12	Excelsior	22	2	5	15	20	53	−33	11	

Source: Flashscore
Rules for classification: Season in progress: 1) Most points won; 2) Less points lost; 3) Goal difference; 4) Goals scored; 5) Alphabetical order; End of season: 1) Points; 2) Goal difference; 3) Goals scored; 4) Head-to-head points; 5) Head-to-head goal difference; 6) Head-to-head away goals scored; 7) Play-off if relevant for deciding champion otherwise by draw. 8) Penalty shoot-out (only after a play-off)
(C) Champions

== Results ==
Home \ Away	ADO	AJA	AZ	EXC	FEY	FOR	HEE	PEC	PSV	TEL	TWE	UTR
ADO Den Haag		1–3	2–0	3–0	2–1	1–1	0–1	1–2	0–0	4–0	2–3	2–1
Ajax	3–0		3–0	6–1	4–0	1–1	5–1	3–2	2–1	0–0	0–1	5–2
AZ	2–4	1–2		1–1	1–2	1–0	1–2	1–1	3–3	0–1	2–2	0–0
Excelsior	0–1	1–3	1–2		1–0	2–4	2–1	1–1	1–1	2–2	0–2	1–4
Feyenoord	1–1	0–1	2–1	2–1		1–3	0–0	4–0	0–2	3–0	0–3	1–2
Fortuna Sittard	0–4	0–4	0–1	5–0	2–1		4–0	3–1	1–0	7–1	2–0	2–2
Heerenveen	0–2	2–1	0–1	1–0	0–2	0–0		0–2	1–3	1–0	0–2	0–0
PEC Zwolle	0–0	1–3	1–0	3–1	2–0	1–7	2–2		2–0	2–0	0–4	3–4
PSV	3–1	3–3	5–1	3–1	1–1	3–0	5–0	3–1		5–0	1–2	4–0
Telstar	1–0	2–5	2–6	1–1	0–2	0–8	2–1	0–4	1–3		0–7	1–2
Twente	1–0	0–3	2–1	5–2	3–1	3–1	3–2	2–1	3–1	2–0		4–0
Utrecht	0–0	0–2	2–2	2–0	4–2	0–6	1–0	2–4	0–2	4–2	2–2	

Source: Flashscore
Legend: Blue = home team win; Yellow = draw; Red = away team win.

== Statistics ==
=== Top scorers ===
As of 11 May 2024

Rank	Player	Club	Goals
1	(Belgium) Tessa Wullaert	Fortuna Sittard	26
2	(Netherlands) Romée Leuchter	Ajax	20
3	(Netherlands) Joëlle Smits	PSV	17
4	(Netherlands) Lobke Loonen	ADO Den Haag	13
5	(Netherlands) Floor Spaan	AZ	11
6	(Netherlands) Liz Rijsbergen	Twente	10
6	(Netherlands) Eshly Bakker	Utrecht	10
8	(Netherlands) Chimera Ripa	PSV	9
8	(Netherlands) Tiny Hoekstra	Ajax	9
8	(United States) Taylor Ziemer	Twente	9
8	(Netherlands) Desiree van Lunteren	AZ	9
