= Marlo Sweatman =

Jamaican footballer (born 1994)

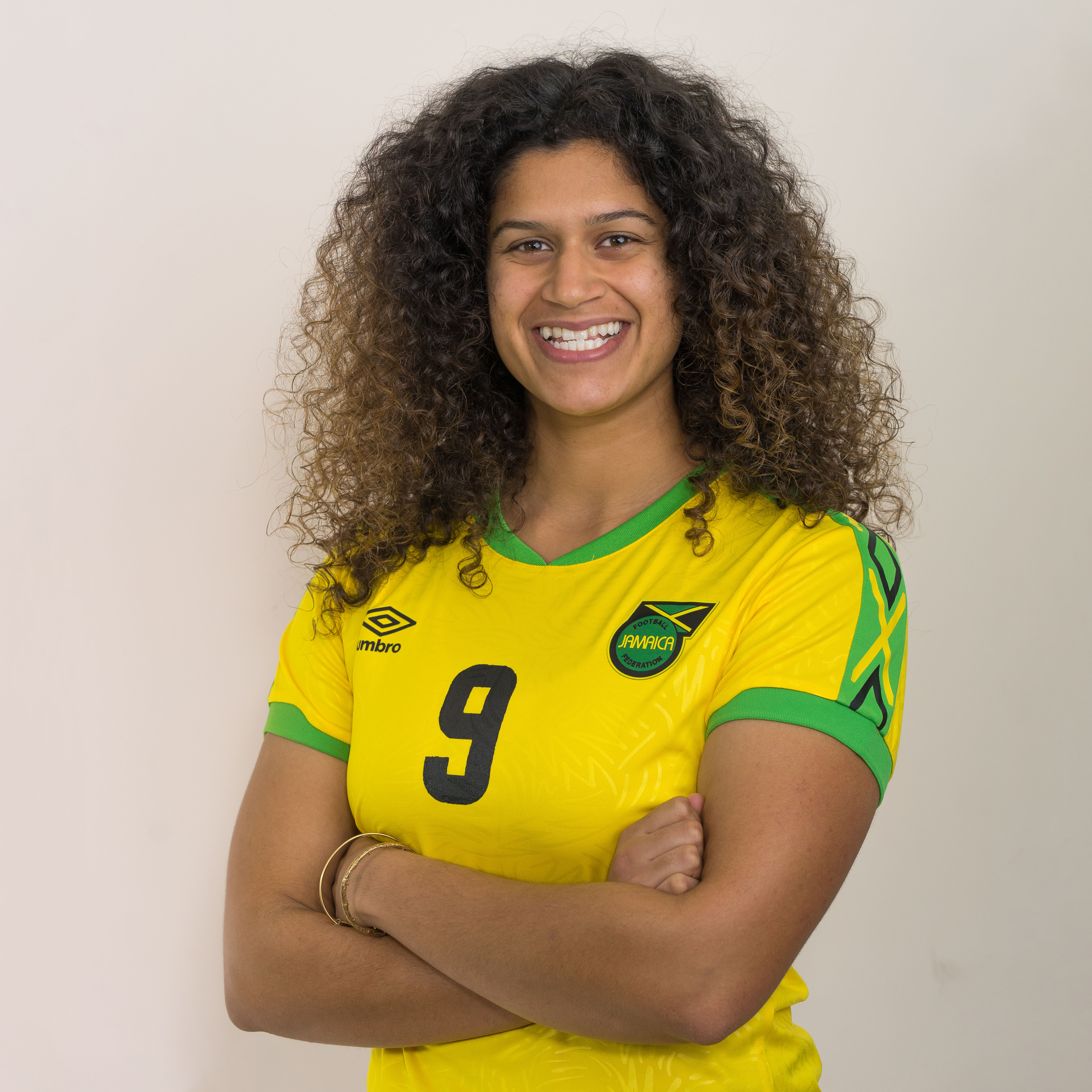

Personal information
- Full name: Marlo Carmen Colette Sweatman
- Date of birth: 1 December 1994 (age 31)
- Place of birth: Woodbridge, Virginia, U.S.
- Height: 1.73 m (5 ft 8 in)
- Positions: Attacking midfielder; defensive midfielder

College career
Years	Team	Apps	(Gls)
2013	Florida State Seminoles	6	(0)
2014–2016	Oregon Ducks	57	(4)

Senior career*
Years	Team	Apps	(Gls)
2016	LA Premier	14	(7)
2017	Töcksfors IF	7	(2)
2017–2018	PEC Zwolle	24	(1)
2019–2021	Szent Mihály	23	(0)
2021–2024	Haladás Viktória	21	(4)
2024–2025	Brooklyn FC	0	(0)

International career^{‡}
2011–2012	Jamaica U20	8	(2)
2018–2024	Jamaica	20	(3)
Medal record
Representing Jamaica
CONCACAF W Championship
Third place	2018 United States
- * Club domestic league appearances and goals as of 11 March 2025 ‡ National team caps and goals as of 11 March 2025

Marlo Carmen Colette Sweatman (born 1 December 1994) is a former professional footballer who played as a midfielder. Born in the United States, she represented Jamaica internationally.

== Club career ==
Sweatman signed to play in Hungary with Viktória FC Szombathely.

On 11 March 2025, it was announced that Sweatman had retired from professional soccer.

== International career ==
Sweatman plays internationally for Jamaica.

=== International goals ===
Scores and results list Jamaica's goal tally first

No.	Date	Venue	Opponent	Score	Result	Competition
1	25 August 2018	National Stadium, Kingston, Jamaica	Antigua and Barbuda	8–0	9–0	2018 CONCACAF Women's Championship qualification
2	25 August 2018	National Stadium, Kingston, Jamaica	Antigua and Barbuda	9–0	9–0	2018 CONCACAF Women's Championship qualification
3	11 October 2018	H-E-B Park, Edinburg, United States	Cuba	9–0	9–0	2018 CONCACAF Women's Championship
4	28 February 2019	National Stadium, Kingston, Jamaica	Chile	1–0	1–0	Friendly
