= Eline Koster =

Dutch footballer (born 1997)

Personal information
- Date of birth: 14 January 1997 (age 29)
- Place of birth: Heinenoord, Netherlands
- Position: Midfielder

Youth career
- ADO Den Haag

Senior career*
Years	Team	Apps	(Gls)
2016–2018	ADO Den Haag	16	(2)
2018–2020	Excelsior	34	(5)
2020–2021	ADO Den Haag	25	(3)

International career
2013	Netherlands U17	2	(0)
2015	Netherlands U19	1	(2)
- * Club domestic league appearances and goals

Eline Koster (born 14 January 1997) is a Dutch former footballer who played as a midfielder for the ADO Den Haag women's team for three seasons in the Eredivisie women's league. She also played for two seasons with Excelsior (Barendrecht).

== Early life and training ==
Koster was born in Heinenoord. At the age of 10, she was scouted by the Royal Dutch Football Association (KNVB), while playing in a school football tournament. She went on to play with boys at regional football club SV Heinenoord for six years, because there were no girls' teams. In November 2011, she was pre-selected for the Netherlands U15 team.

== Club career ==
Koster trained at the Centrum voor Topsport in Amsterdam, and joined ADO Den Haag in 2016. After playing for the ADO women's team for two seasons, she transferred to Excelsior (Barendrecht) to gain more playing time. Her success as an all-rounder at Excelsior led ADO to recruit her back in 2020.

During her final season with ADO, Koster scored three times in the Eredivisie Cup. Her final match as a footballer was in ADO's cup final against PSV Einhoven in June 2021.

== International career ==
On 27 July 2013, Koster made her international debut as a substitute in a Netherlands U17 match against Belgium. She went on to play for the Netherlands women's national U19 team.

== Personal life ==
In 2020, Koster completed her studies as a physiotherapist, and started working part-time. In 2021, she decided to retire from football at the age of 24 to work full-time for financial reasons.
