= Joëlle Smits =

Dutch footballer (born 2000)

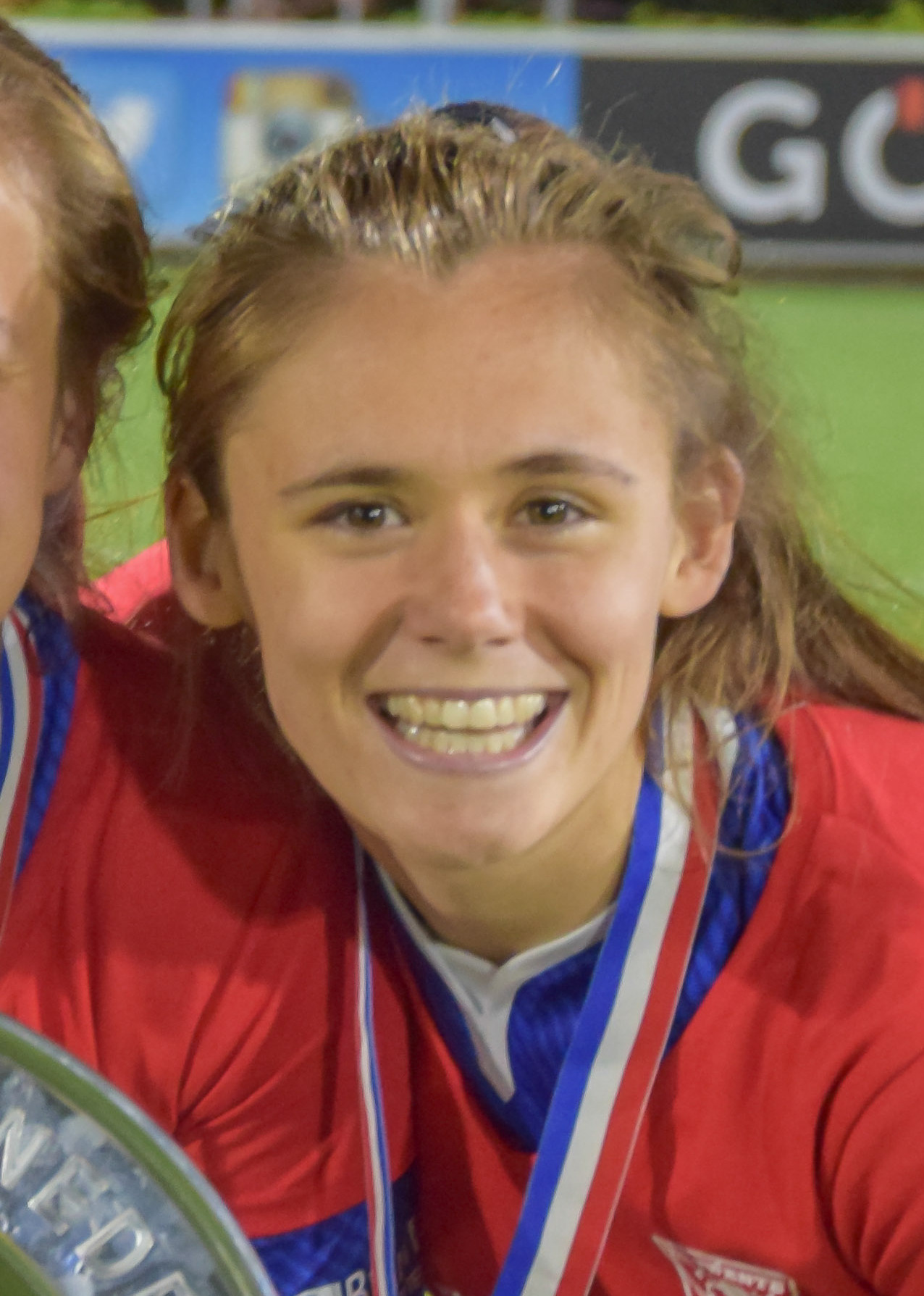
- Smits with Twente in 2019

Personal information
- Date of birth: 7 February 2000 (age 26)
- Place of birth: 's-Hertogenbosch, Netherlands
- Height: 1.69 m (5 ft 7 in)
- Position: Striker

Team information
- Current team: Ajax
- Number: 10

Youth career
- 2006–2014: OJC Rosmalen
- 2014–2015: Brabant United
- 2015–2017: CTO Eindhoven

Senior career*
Years	Team	Apps	(Gls)
2017–2019	Twente	45	(45)
2019–2021	PSV	30	(39)
2021–2022	VfL Wolfsburg	13	(1)
2021–2022	VfL Wolfsburg II	4	(3)
2022–2025	PSV	60	(30)
2025–	Ajax	19	(2)

International career
2014–2015	Netherlands U15	8	(6)
2015–2016	Netherlands U16	16	(15)
2016	Netherlands U17	7	(15)
2017–2019	Netherlands U19	38	(33)
2018	Netherlands U20	6	(2)
2019–2023	Netherlands U23	10	(5)
2020–2021	Netherlands	8	(1)
- * Club domestic league appearances and goals as of 26 September 2026

Joëlle Smits (born 7 February 2000) is a Dutch professional footballer who plays as a striker for Vrouwen Eredivisie club Ajax.

== Club career ==
Smits started her youth career with OJC Rosmalen at the age of six. She spent eight years there playing alongside boys before moving to Brabant United. In 2015, she moved to CTO Eindhoven.

In May 2017, Smits signed her first professional contract with Eredivisie club Twente. She made her debut on 1 September in a 3–0 league win against Zwolle. She scored in 58th minute of the game before being replaced by Bente Jansen. She scored 25 goals in 21 league matches during the 2018–19 season to help her club win the league title.

In February 2019, it was confirmed that Smits would join PSV prior to the 2019–20 season. She was top Eredivisie scorer when football leagues across Netherlands were suspended by Dutch government in March 2020 due to the COVID-19 pandemic.

On 15 September 2020, German Frauen-Bundesliga club VfL Wolfsburg announced that Smits has signed a three-year contract with the club, which would start in July 2021. On 5 June 2021, she played her last match for PSV in the cup final against ADO Den Haag. She scored the only goal in the match to win PSV's first trophy in its history. With 52 goals from 45 matches across all competitions, Smits left the club as PSV's all-time top scorer.

During her only season with Wolfsburg, Smits won the German league and domestic cup titles. On 3 June 2022, her contract with the club was terminated by mutual agreement. She returned to her former club PSV on the same day, signing a three-year contract until June 2025.

On 30 June 2025, Smits joined Ajax on a two-year contract until June 2027.

== International career ==
Smits is a former Dutch youth international and has represented her nation with different age level teams. On 21 October 2016, she scored seven goals in her team's 11–0 win against Bulgaria during 2017 UEFA Women's Under-17 Championship qualifiers. She was also part of Netherlands under-19 team that reached semi-finals of UEFA Women's Under-19 Championship in 2017 and 2019.

With 15 goals from 16 matches, she holds the record for most caps and goals for the Netherlands under-16 team. Similarly, with 33 goals from 38 matches, Smits is the most capped player and all-time top scorer of the Netherlands under-19 team.

Smits made her senior team debut on 4 March 2020 in a friendly against Brazil. She came on as an 84th-minute substitute for Vivianne Miedema before the match ended in a goalless draw. On 16 June 2021, Smits was named as a stand-by player for 2020 Olympics. On 20 July, she was added to the final squad as a replacement for injured Sherida Spitse.

== Career statistics ==
=== Club ===
As of match played 24 May 2025

Appearances and goals by club, season and competition
Club	Season	League			National Cup		League Cup		Continental		Total	
Club	Season	Division	Apps	Goals	Apps	Goals	Apps	Goals	Apps	Goals	Apps	Goals
Twente	2017–18	Eredivisie	24	20	1	0	—		—		25	20
Twente	2018–19	Eredivisie	21	25	3	5	—		—		24	30
Twente	Total		45	45	4	5	0	0	0	0	49	50
PSV	2019–20	Eredivisie	12	16	1	1	6	5	—		19	22
PSV	2020–21	Eredivisie	18	23	3	3	3	2	2	2	26	30
PSV	Total		30	39	4	4	9	7	2	2	45	52
VfL Wolfsburg	2021–22	Frauen-Bundesliga	13	1	2	2	—		2	1	17	4
VfL Wolfsburg II	2021–22	2. Frauen-Bundesliga	4	3	—		—		—		4	3
PSV	2022–23	Eredivisie	19	6	4	1	1	0	—		24	7
PSV	2023–24	Eredivisie	22	17	0	0	2	2	—		24	19
PSV	2024–25	Eredivisie	19	7	2	1	1	0	—		22	8
PSV	Total		60	30	6	2	4	2	0	0	70	34
Career total			152	118	16	13	13	9	4	3	185	143

=== International ===
As of match played 30 November 2021

Appearances and goals by national team and year
National team	Year	Apps	Goals
Netherlands	2020	3	0
Netherlands	2021	5	1
Total		8	1

Scores and results list Netherlands' goal tally first, score column indicates score after each Smits goal.

List of international goals scored by Joëlle Smits
No.	Date	Venue	Opponent	Score	Result	Competition
1	22 October 2021	AEK Arena – Georgios Karapatakis, Larnaca, Cyprus	Cyprus	7–0	8–0	2023 FIFA Women's World Cup qualification

== Honours ==
Twente

- Vrouwen Eredivisie: 2018–19

PSV

- KNVB Women's Cup: 2020–21
- Eredivisie Cup: 2024–25

VfL Wolfsburg

- Frauen-Bundesliga: 2021–22
- DFB-Pokal Frauen: 2021–22

Individual

- Vrouwen Eredivisie top goalscorer: 2018–19, 2020–21
- KNVB Women's Cup top goalscorer: 2020–21
- Eredivisie Cup top goalscorer: 2023–24
