= Dominique Bruinenberg =

Dutch footballer

Personal information
- Full name: Dominique Bruinenberg
- Date of birth: 23 January 1993 (age 33)
- Place of birth: Geffen, Netherlands
- Height: 1.64 m (5 ft 4 1/2 in)
- Position: Midfielder

Senior career*
Years	Team	Apps	(Gls)
2011–2015	SC Telstar	91	(7)
2015–2016	ADO Den Haag	23	(5)
2016–2017	AGSM Verona	8	(1)
2017–2018	Sunderland	31	(5)
2018–2019	Everton	12	(0)
2019–2021	PEC Zwolle	31	(10)
2021–2022	SC Sand	19	(0)
2022–2023	SC Telstar	20	(2)

International career^{‡}
2011–2012	Netherlands U-19	2	(0)
- * Club domestic league appearances and goals as of 17:14, 21 May 2024 (UTC) ‡ National team caps and goals as of 28 July 2018

Dominique Bruinenberg (born 23 January 1993) is a Dutch football midfielder who has played for the Netherlands U-19 team.

== Career ==
=== Club ===
==== First spell at SC Telstar ====
Bruinenberg started her career with Eredivisie side SC Telstar VVNH in 2011, where she would spend four seasons as a regular contributor in the Dutch top flight. She registered 91 appearances and scored 7 goals. Bruinenberg made her league debut against ADO Den Haag on 9 September 2011. She scored her first league goal against Heerenveen on 3 May 2012, scoring in the 19th minute.

==== Den Haag ====
In 2015, Bruinenberg was signed to ADO Den Haag. She continued as a regular starter and helped ADO earn the club's third KNVB Women's Cup championship versus AFC Ajax. Staying just a single season with ADO, Bruinenberg made 23 appearances scoring 5 goals. She made her league debut against Twente on 21 August 2015. Bruinenberg scored her first league goal against Heerenveen on 16 October 2015, scoring in the 44th minute.

==== Verona ====
Bruinenberg made the move to Serie A in July 2016, signing with ASD Verona. She made 5 league appearances for Verona, scoring once, and made her first 2 appearances in the Champions League. In the same season, Verona would also finish as runners-up in the Italian Women's Super Cup to ACF Brescia Bruinenberg made her league debut against Jesina on 1 October 2016. She scored her first league goal against Tavagnacco on 1 November 2016, scoring in the 90th+1st minute.

==== Sunderland ====
In February 2017, Bruinenberg left Italy to sign with WSL 1 side, Sunderland Ladies. She made all 8 starts of the Black Cat's 2017 Spring Series campaign, helping Sunderland finish 5th in the table.

During the 2017–18 season, Bruinenberg made 17 more appearances and scoring five goals for Sunderland. She

==== Everton ====
In July 2018, Bruinenberg joined Everton L.F.C. She made her league debut against Birmingham City on 9 September 2018.

==== PEC Zwolle ====
Bruinenberg made her league debut against ADO Den Haag on 23 August 2019. She scored her first league goal against Ajax on 13 September 2019, scoring in the 8th minute. On 2 June 2020, it was announced that Bruinenberg signed a new one year deal. On 10 May 2021, it was announced that Bruinenberg would leave PEC Zwolle.

==== SC Sand ====
Bruinenberg made her league debut against Eintracht Frankfurt on 29 August 2021.

==== Second spell at Telstar ====
She made her league debut against ADO Den Haag on 18 September 2022. Bruinenberg scored her first league goal against Excelsior on 28 October 2022, scoring in the 81st minute. On 16 June 2023, it was announced that Bruinenberg would be leaving Telstar.

=== International career ===
Bruinenberg has made appearances for the Netherlands U-19 team but has yet to appear for the senior team as of 2024. She made her U19 debut against Croatia U19s on 17 September 2011.

== Honours ==
ADO Den Haag

- KNVB Women's Cup Winner: 2016
