= Nikita Tromp =

Dutch footballer (born 2002)

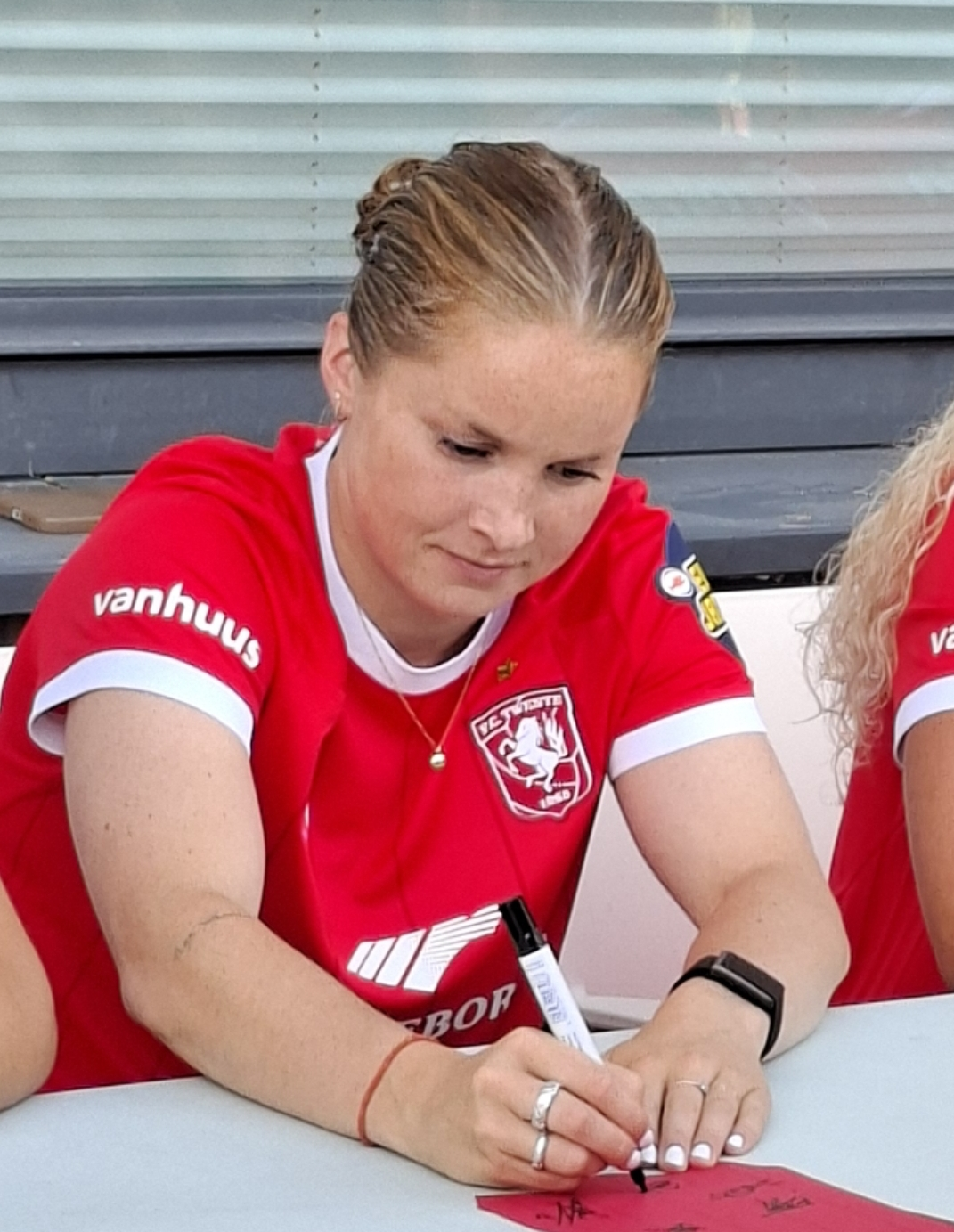
- Tromp in 2026

Personal information
- Full name: Nikita Rudy Tromp
- Date of birth: 8 May 2002 (age 24)
- Place of birth: Beverwijk, Netherlands
- Position: Forward

Team information
- Current team: Twente
- Number: 11

Youth career
- ADO '20
- –2017: AFC '34
- 2017–2018: CTO Amsterdam
- 2018–2019: Ajax

Senior career*
Years	Team	Apps	(Gls)
2018–2019	Ajax	0	(0)
2019–2020	PEC Zwolle	12	(5)
2020–2024	Ajax	43	(19)
2024–2026	Utrecht	36	(17)
2026–	Twente	10	(2)

International career
2016	Netherlands U15	4	(0)
2018	Netherlands U16	3	(0)
2017–2019	Netherlands U17	23	(31)
2020	Netherlands U18	3	(2)
2019–2020	Netherlands U19	10	(10)
2021–2022	Netherlands U23	10	(6)
- * Club domestic league appearances and goals as of 22 November 2026

Nikita Rudy Tromp (born 8 May 2002) is a Dutch professional footballer who plays as a forward for Vrouwen Eredivisie club Twente.

== Club career ==
=== Ajax ===
She began her youth career with ADO '20 and AFC '34. In 2018, she joined the KNVB training squad in Amsterdam. At the end of the season, the training squads were integrated with Ajax, allowing her the opportunity to play for the Eredivisie club. She made her first-team debut on 10 August 2018 in a Champions League match against Linfield.

=== PEC Zwolle ===
Tromp signed a one-year contract with PEC Zwolle in June 2019. She made her Eredivisie debut against ADO Den Haag on 23 August 2019. She scored her first league goal against VV Alkmaar on 20 September 2019, scoring in the 43rd minute. After the 2019–20 season was suspended due to the COVID-19 pandemic, PEC Zwolle announced Tromp's departure from the club in April 2020.

=== Return to Ajax ===
Tromp's return to Ajax became public in May 2020. On 16 September, she made her second debut at De Toekomst in a 3–1 league victory against FC Twente. She scored her first league goals against her former club PEC Zwolle on 30 October, scoring a brace in the 49th and 56th minute.

In November 2021, she was voted as the greatest talent in Europe. On 17 May 2023, Tromp extended her contract with Ajax until mid-2024. However, she also dealt with knee injuries.

=== Utrecht ===
On 22 June 2024, FC Utrecht reached an agreement for Tromp to join the club, signing a contract until 2025.

=== Twente ===
In April 2026, Tromp joined Twente on a two-year contract.

== International career ==
Tromp has represented Netherlands at various youth levels. With 31 goals, she is the all-time top scorer of Netherlands under-17 team.

Tromp scored 6 goals against Georgia U17 on 17 October 2018. She scored 4 goals against Latvia U17 on 20 October 2018. Tromp scored a hat-trick against Austria U17 on 5 May 2019. She scored 6 goals against Montenegro U19 on 2 October 2019.

== Personal life ==
Tromp is of Indonesian descent. Her maternal grandfather is a native Indonesian who was born in Indonesia.

== Honours ==
Individual

- UEFA Women's Under-17 Championship team of the tournament: 2019
