= Kim Mourmans =

Dutch footballer

Personal information
- Date of birth: 1 April 1995 (age 31)
- Place of birth: Maastricht, Netherlands
- Position: Midfielder

Team information
- Current team: Beerse Boys

Senior career*
Years	Team	Apps	(Gls)
2012–2015	Standard Liège	49	(4)
2015–2018	PSV	57	(0)
2019	Ajax	5	(1)
2019–2020	ADO Den Haag	12	(0)
2020–	Beerse Boys		

International career^{‡}
2010–2012	Netherlands U17	4	(4)
2012–2014	Netherlands U19	12	(0)
2015	Netherlands	2	(0)
- * Club domestic league appearances and goals as of 14 February 2020 ‡ National team caps and goals as of 11 March 2015

Kim Mourmans (born 1 April 1995) is a Dutch footballer who plays as a midfielder for Beerse Boys. She has been a member of the Netherlands women's national team.

== Career ==
=== Standard Liège ===
Mourmans made her league debut against Anderlecht on 6 October 2012. She scored her first league goal against PEC Zwolle on 6 September 2013, scoring in the 78th minute.

=== PSV ===
Mourmans made her league debut against PEC Zwolle on 21 August 2015. On 18 April 2017, she extended her contract. She left PSV in 2018. Due to a back injury, Mourmans' contract was not extended and she signed with Ajax, who helped her rehabilitate.

=== Ajax ===
Mourmans made her league debut against PSV on 8 February 2019. She scored her first league goal against Twente on 3 May 2019, scoring in the 65th minute.

=== ADO Den Haag ===
On 5 July 2019, Mourmans was announced at ADO Den Haag. She made her league debut against PEC Zwolle on 23 August 2019.

=== Beerse Boys ===
On 20 June 2020, Mourmans was announced at Beerse Boys.

== International career ==
Mourmans made her Netherlands debut against Finland on 6 March 2015.
