= Amy Banarsie =

Surinamese footballer (born 2000)

Personal information
- Full name: Amy Banarsie
- Date of birth: 12 September 2000 (age 26)
- Place of birth: Netherlands
- Position: Forward

Team information
- Current team: AZ
- Number: 10

Senior career*
Years	Team	Apps	(Gls)
2016–2022	PEC Zwolle	32	(4)
2022–	AZ	14	(1)

International career^{‡}
2022–	Suriname	2	(1)
- * Club domestic league appearances and goals as of 10 February 2023 ‡ National team caps and goals as of 22 February 2022

Amy Banarsie (born 12 September 2000) is a footballer who plays as a forward for Dutch Eredivisie club VV Alkmaar. Born in the Netherlands, she represents Suriname at international level.

== Club career ==
Banarsie has played for PEC Zwolle in the Netherlands.

== International career ==
Banarsie was capped for Suriname at senior level during the 2022 CONCACAF W Championship qualification.

=== International goals ===
Scores and results list Suriname goal tally first

No.	Date	Venue	Opponent	Score	Result	Competition	Ref.
1	22 February 2022	Frank Essed Stadion, Paramaribo, Suriname	Anguilla	5–0	5–0	2022 CONCACAF W Championship qualification	
