= VV Alkmaar =

Defunct Dutch women's football club

- Full name: Vrouwenvoetbal Alkmaar
- Founded: 1 July 2017; 9 years ago
- Dissolved: 2023
- Ground: Sportpark Robonsbosweg
- Head coach: Mark de Vries
- League: Vrouwen Eredivisie
- 2022–23: 9th
- Website: https://www.vvalkmaar.nl/
Home colours

Vrouwenvoetbal Alkmaar, commonly known as VV Alkmaar, was a Dutch football club that competed in the Eredivisie, the top women's league in the Netherlands, until 2023. During its time in the Eredivisie, it was the only team in the league not affiliated with a men's professional club.

== History ==
From 2007 until 2011, AZ Alkmaar had a successful women's club, but when it decided to dissolve the women's team for financial reasons, most of the players moved to nearby SC Telstar in Velsen, which started a women's club in 2011. Telstar continued to train in Alkmaar because its offices were there. After the 2016–17 season, the women's club decided to separate from Telstar, move to Alkmaar, and form a new club.

In late 2022, the club announced that AZ Alkmaar would compete in the Eredivisie beginning in the 2023-2024 season.

== Players ==
=== Final squad ===
As of May 2023

Note: Flags indicate national team as defined under FIFA eligibility rules; some limited exceptions apply. Players may hold more than one non-FIFA nationality.

No.	Pos.	Nation	Player
1	GK	NED	Femke Liefting
2	DF	NED	Ginia Caprino
3	MF	NED	Robin Blom
4	DF	NED	Maudy Stoop
5	DF	NED	Cammie Mol
6	MF	NED	Kim Remijnse
7	FW	TUR	Elanur Polat
8	MF	NED	Manique de Vette
9	FW	NED	Veerle van der Most
10	FW	SUR	Amy Banarsie
11	MF	NED	Ilvy Zijp
12	FW	NED	Bo de Weegh

No.	Pos.	Nation	Player
14	DF	NED	Judith Roosjen
15	MF	NED	Karlijn Woons
16	GK	NED	Puck Louwes
17	MF	NED	Isabelle Nottet
18	FW	NED	Sanne Peereboom
19	MF	NED	Jasmijn van der Heijde
20	MF	NED	Isa Colin
21	MF	NED	Elfi Maass
22	MF	NED	Kim Smal
23	MF	NED	Floor Spaan
30	DF	NED	Yaël Mollink
