= Dutch football league system =

National association football system

The Dutch football league system consists of two fully professional leagues (Eredivisie and Eerste Divisie) and eight levels of amateur football leagues. The three highest amateur leagues, the Tweede, Derde and Vierde Divisie play in nationwide leagues and the five levels below are regional leagues.

== Promotion and relegation ==
All the leagues are connected by a promotion and relegation system, but in order to be promoted to the Eerste Divisie a club has to submit a solid business plan to be approved by the Royal Dutch Football Association, as well as meet certain stadium demands, and some other demands that the association stated for all the teams in the top two leagues.

Before 2010 there was no promotion and relegation (based on league result) between the highest amateur level (back then the Hoofdklasse) and the professional leagues. In the 2010–11 season the Topklasse was introduced as an intermediate level between the professional and amateur leagues. Promotion was optional, so it was possible that the IJsselmeervogels who won the 2010–11 Topklasse, was not promoted because they did not want to be bound to the demands for playing in the Eerste Divisie.

In 2016 the Tweede Divisie was (re)introduced between the Topklasse (renamed to Derde Divisie) and Eerste Divisie to further work on stimulating promotion and relegation between the amateur and professional leagues. However, due to resistance from the amateur clubs to meet the demands for the professional leagues and worries from the professional clubs to face bankruptcy after relegation, mandatory promotion and relegation was suspended for five to 10 years in June 2022.

== Men ==
Level	Level name	League(s)/division(s)									
		Professional football									
1	Eredivisie	Eredivisie; 18 clubs									
2	Eerste Divisie	Eerste Divisie; 20 clubs									
		Amateur football (nationwide)									
3	Tweede Divisie	Tweede Divisie; 18 clubs									
4	Derde Divisie	Group A 18 clubs					Group B 18 clubs				
5	Vierde Divisie	Group A 16 clubs		Group B 16 clubs			Group C 16 clubs		Group D 16 clubs		
		Amateur football (regional)									
		West I		West II		South I	South II	East		North	
6	Eerste Klasse	1A; 1 Group	1B; 1 Group	1C; 1 Group	1D; 1 Group	1E; 1 Group	1F; 1 Group	1G; 1 Group	1H; 1 Group	1I; 1 Group	1J; 1 Group
		Saturday Groups					Sunday Groups				
		West I	West II	South I	East	North	West I	South I	South II	East	North
7	Tweede Klasse	Sat 2A - 2B; 2 Groups	Sat 2C - 2D; 2 Groups	Sat 2E - 2G; 3 Groups	Sat 2H - 2I; 2 Groups	Sat 2J - 2K; 2 Groups	Sun 2A - 2B; 2 Groups	Sun 2C - 2D; 2 Groups	Sun 2E - 2F; 2 Groups	Sun 2G; 1 Group	Sun 2H - 2I; 2 Groups
8	Derde Klasse	Sat 3A - 3D; 4 Groups	Sat 3A - 3D; 4 Groups	Sat 3A - 3D; 4 Groups	Sat 3A - 3D; 4 Groups	Sat 3A - 3D; 4 Groups	Sun 3A - 3C; 3 Groups	Sun 3A - 3D; 4 Groups	Sun 3A - 3D; 4 Groups	Sun 3A - 3C; 3 Groups	Sun 3A - 3C; 3 Groups
9	Vierde Klasse	Sat 4A - 4E; 5 Groups	Sat 4A - 4F; 6 Groups	Sat 4A - 4H; 6 Groups	Sat 4A - 4D; 4 Groups	Sat 4A - 4F; 6 Groups	Sun 4A - 4C; 3 Groups	Sun 4A - 4E; 5 Groups	Sun 4A - 4I; 9 Groups	Sun 4A - 4E; 5 Groups	Sun 4A - 4D; 4 Groups
10	Vijfde Klasse	Sat 5A - 5D; 4 Groups	Sat 5A - 5D; 4 Groups		Sat 5A - 5D; 4 Groups	Sat 5A - 5G; 7 Groups	Sun 5A - 5B; 2 Groups	Sun 5A - 5E; 5 Groups	Sun 5A - 5E; 5 Groups	Sun 5A - 5F; 6 Groups	Sun 5A - 5D; 4 Groups

=== Professional leagues ===
- 18 teams in the Eredivisie (English: Honorary Division)
- 20 teams (of which 4 are reserve teams of Eredivisie teams) in the Eerste Divisie (English: First Division). The champion and runner-up of the Eerste Divisie is promoted directly to the Eredivisie, and the two worst teams in the Eredivisie are relegated to the Eerste Divisie. The team finishing 16th in the Eredivisie competes in promotion and relegation play-offs with 6 teams from the Eerste Divisie, in which the team from the Eredivisie play up to two rounds, and the other six teams play up to three rounds.

=== Amateur leagues ===
The highest league is called Tweede Divisie (English: Second Division). Until 1971, when the division was discontinued, it was comparable to the former Topklasse. The Tweede Divisie was reintroduced in 2016, decrementing the Topklasse and lower leagues by a level in the pyramid.

- The second highest is the Derde Divisie (English: Third Division), formerly Topklasse (Top Class). Since the 2017–18 season, 36 teams compete in the Derde Divisie., divided into two leagues, each containing 18 teams. After the season the A and B champions compete for the overall championship. The Derde Divisie champion promotes to the Tweede Divisie (Eerste Divisie until 2016); if they refuse promotion or don't meet necessary criteria, the runners-up will replace them. If also the runners-up refuse promotion or don't meet necessary criteria, no team is relegated from the Tweede Divisie.
- The third league is called Vierde Divisie (English: Fourth Division), formerly Hoofdklasse (Main Class), which is then followed by six numbered amateur leagues. It is divided into four divisions each, with 16 clubs in each division.
- The next league is called Eerste Klasse (English: First Class), with ten league divisions, with 14 clubs each.
- Tweede Klasse (English: Second Class), with 11 Saturday league divisions and nine Sunday league divisions, with 14 clubs each.
- The next level, Derde Klasse (English: Third Class), is additionally divided into regional groups. The Saturday and Sunday leagues are divided into five regional groups each with four divisions in every Saturday league. Sunday is divided into three or four divisions each. Each division has between 11 and 14 clubs.
- In the Vierde Klasse (English: Fourth Class), the number of divisions varies from four to nine. Again, each division contains between 11 and 14 clubs. This is the lowest amateur league in the South 1 region.
- The lowest amateur league overall, in all regions except for the South 1 region, is the Vijfde Klasse (English: Fifth Class). The Saturday league has four regional groups and the Sunday league is divided into five regions. The number of divisions varies from four to seven, with each division having between 11 and 14 clubs.
- Until 2015, Zesde Klasse (English: Sixth Class) had no regional groupings for the Saturday league (all teams were from the North-region), but four for the Sunday league. The number of divisions was between three and seven, with 10 to 14 clubs participating in each division.
- Until 2010, Zevende Klasse (English: Seventh Class) only existed in Sunday football in the North region. There was a total of three divisions, with 10 to 14 clubs participating in each division.
- Until 2001, Achtste Klasse (English: Eighth Class) only existed in Sunday football in the West 1 region. There was only one division.

Since 2020–21, under-19 teams of professional or amateur clubs in the Tweede Divisie or higher no longer participate in the Derde Divisie, as they have been placed in the newly formed under-21 league. The new under-23 competition is for Tweede or Derde amateur clubs that are not directly eligible for under-21. Until 2022–23, clubs from Derde Divisie down to the Eerste Klasse were divided into Saturday and Sunday groups. The separation between Saturday and Sunday football was abolished in the Derde and Vierde Divisie as well as in the Eerste Klasse from 2023–24. Amateur clubs are asked before the season whether they want to play their home games on Saturday or Sunday. This rule may be deviated from by principled Saturday clubs that retain the right to play on their day.

== Women ==
Until 2007 the Hoofdklasse was the top division. From 2007 the Eredivisie was the top division until 2011 when the BeNe League was created. In 2011–12 the Topklasse was created above the Hoofdklasse. Since 2015 the Eredivisie again is the top-level league, as the BeNe League was ended. The Hoofdklasse plays its matches on two different days per division. From 2025, 12 teams participate in the Eredivisie, with this being brought down to 10 for the 2026/2027 season.

Level	Level name	League(s)/division(s)															
1	Eredivisie	Eredivisie; 12 clubs															
2	Eerste Divisie	Eerste Divisie; 7 clubs															
3	Tweede Divisie	Tweede Divisie; 7 clubs															
4	Topklasse	Topklasse; 12 clubs															
5	Hoofdklasse	Hoofdklasse A Saturday; 12 clubs								Hoofdklasse B Sunday; 12 clubs							
6	Eerste Klasse	Eerste Klasse; Group A, Saturday 12 clubs				Eerste Klasse; Group B, Saturday 12 clubs				Eerste Klasse; Group C, Sunday 12 clubs				Eerste Klasse; Group D, Sunday 12 clubs			
7	Tweede Klasse	2 A Saturday, West 1		2 B Saturday, West 2		2 C Saturday, East 1		2 D Saturday, East 2		2 E Sunday, West		2 F Sunday, South 1		2 G Sunday, South 2		2 H Sunday, South 1	
8	Derde Klasse	Sat 3A; West	Sat 3B; West	Sat 3C; South	Sat 3D; West	Sat 3E; East	Sat 3F; East	Sat 3G; East	Sat 3H; East	Sun 3A; West	Sun 3B; West	Sun 3C; West	Sun 3D; South	Sun 3E; South	Sun 3F; South	Sun 3G; East	Sun 3H; East
