= Women's football in the Netherlands =

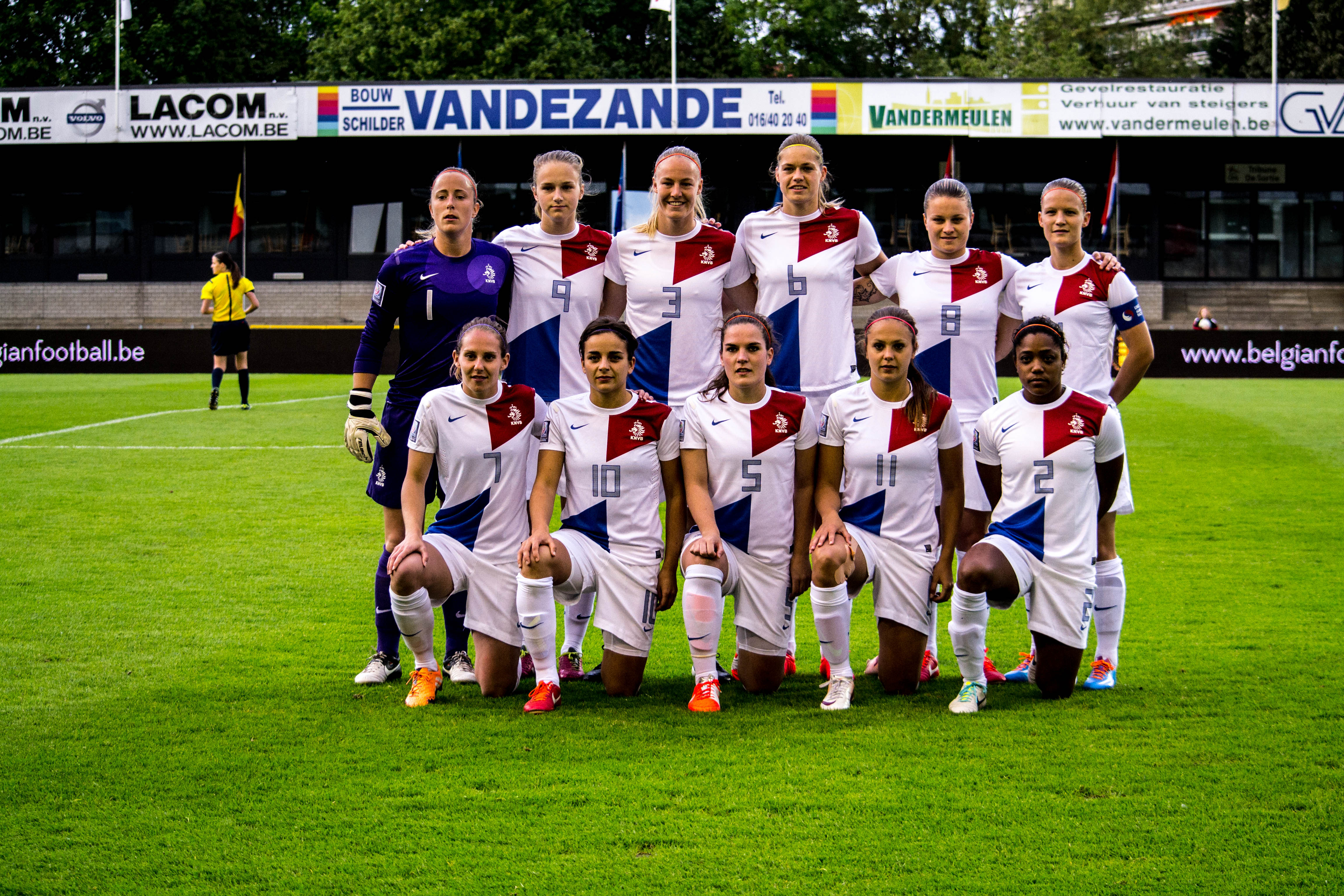
- Netherlands women's national football team in May 2014
- Country: Netherlands
- Governing body: KNVB
- National team: Women's national team

National competitions
- KNVB Women's Cup; Eredivisie Cup; Dutch Women's Super Cup

Club competitions
- Eredivisie (established in 2007 and re-established in 2015); Hoofdklasse; Topklasse; Historical: BeNe League

International competitions
- Champions League; FIFA Women's World Cup (national team); European Championship (national team); Olympics (national team)

Audience records
- Single match: 28,182

Women's football in the Netherlands has traditionally had a low profile and female players had to play abroad. However, the national team began having success in the 2010s, notably in winning the UEFA Women's Euro 2017 tournament and the domestic Eredivisie began expanding.

== History ==
Women first started trying playing football in the 1890s but were banned by the KNVB. In 1896 Sparta Rotterdam tried to form a women's football team but were thwarted. IDecades later, the Dutch Ladies Football Association was formed in 1955 and even created a women's football league but was banned by the KNVB. Women's football was played regionally in the Netherlands until the 1970s, when UEFA declared all its members must invest in women's football.

== National team ==
On 17 April 1971, the French team played the first women's international football match recognized by FIFA against the Netherlands. The match took place in Hazebrouck, France and resulted in a 4–0 defeat for the Netherlands, with Jocelyne Ratignier scoring a hattrick.

The Netherlands did not have a strong track record in women's international football until the 2010s. They did not qualify for the UEFA Women's Championship until 2009 and did not qualify for their first Women's World Cup until 2015, when the tournament expanded from 16 to 24 teams. In 2017, the national team won the UEFA Women's Euro 2017, which the country also hosted. Four out of 5 Dutch television viewers watched the Netherlands win the championship. Two years later, in their second World Cup, the Dutch advanced all the way to the final before losing to the United States, 0–2.

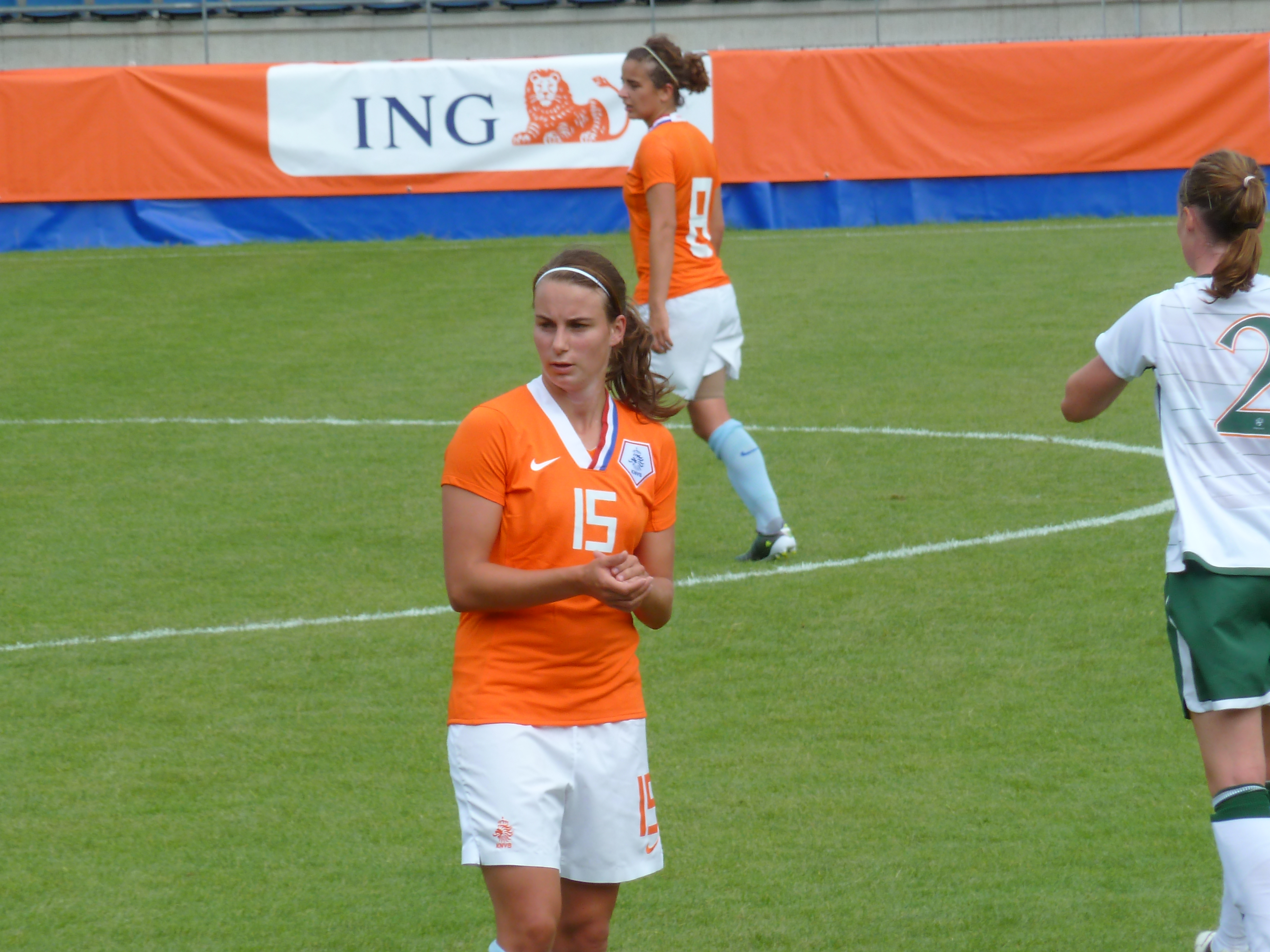
Renate Jansen during friendly match on 15-8-2010

== Domestic League ==
The professional women's Eredivisie formed in 2007. In 2012, the KNVB and its Belgian counterpart, the KBVB/URBSFA, created a new top league for both countries, the BeNe League. From the Dutch perspective, the move was intended to improve the Netherlands women's national football team. However, the two federations scrapped the BeNe League after the 2014–15 season, with the KNVB choosing to restart the women's Eredivisie with the same seven clubs that had formed the Dutch contingent in the final season of the joint league. The Eredivisie has since expanded to twelve teams. The league does not have promotion and relegation.

Level	Level Name	League(s)/Division(s)															
1	Eredivisie	Eredivisie; 12 clubs															
2	Topklasse	Topklasse; 12 clubs															
3	Hoofdklasse	Hoofdklasse A Saturday; 12 clubs								Hoofdklasse B Sunday; 12 clubs							
4	Eerste Klasse	Eerste Klasse; Group A, Saturday 12 clubs				Eerste Klasse; Group B, Saturday 12 clubs				Eerste Klasse; Group C, Sunday 12 clubs				Eerste Klasse; Group D, Sunday 12 clubs			
5	Tweede Klasse	2 A Saturday, West 1		2 B Saturday, West 2		2 C Saturday, East 1		2 D Saturday, East 2		2 E Sunday, West		2 F Sunday, South 1		2 G Sunday, South 2		2 H Sunday, South 1	
6	Derde Klasse	Sat 3A; West	Sat 3B; West	Sat 3C; South	Sat 3D; West	Sat 3E; East	Sat 3F; East	Sat 3G; East	Sat 3H; East	Sun 3A; West	Sun 3B; West	Sun 3C; West	Sun 3D; South	Sun 3E; South	Sun 3F; South	Sun 3G; East	Sun 3H; East

== See also ==
Football in the Netherlands
