= FC Purmerend =

- Full name: Football Club Purmerend
- Founded: 16 June 1926; 100 years ago
- Ground: Sportpark Weidevenne, Purmerend
- Capacity: 1,000
- Manager: Vincent Gorter
- League: Derde Klasse Saturday
- 2024/2025: 9th
- Website: https://www.fc-purmerend.nl/
Home colours

FC Purmerend is a Dutch football club based in Purmerend, Netherlands. It was founded in 1926 and currently plays its matches at Sportpark Weidevenne but previously played at four venues across the city. The club currently competes in the Derde Klasse, the eighth tier of Dutch football.

== History ==
For all of the club's history it has played in the amateur leagues of Dutch football, with its highest finish being sixth in the Tweede Klasse in the 2012/2013 season and the lowest being 9th in the Zesde Klasse in the 1999/2000 season. The club first started out in the Overwhere Polder and moved to their second ground ten years later. In 1952 the club had to move due to an auction house being built on top of their playing ground, they played their games at the same ground as Purmersteijn until 1954 when they found a new ground to play their home games at. In 1970 the club had to move once more due to the ground being too small for its increasing member size, they found a new home in the Koog where 80 club members banded together to make a new clubhouse. They moved to the new ground in 1972, which was opened by the then councillor of Education and Sport Affairs. In 1998 the municipality asked the club to move, to which they agreed as the grounds were due to heavy renovations. On June 9, 2001, the new grounds were opened, which now also had a women's changing room to accommodate the ever growing numbers of female members, and they have since played their games in the suburb of Weidevenne.

== Current squad ==
As of 15 October 2023

Note: Flags indicate national team as defined under FIFA eligibility rules; some limited exceptions apply. Players may hold more than one non-FIFA nationality.

No.	Pos.	Nation	Player
—		NED	Kees Ayi
—		NED	Randy Balogun
—		NED	Dick Bos
—		NED	Nick Brijde
—		NED	Earvin Codfried
—		NED	Chi-An Dang
—		NED	Lex Hodde
—		NED	Jeffrey Koreman
—		NED	Nederlof
—		NED	Jeffrey Neuteboom

No.	Pos.	Nation	Player
—		NED	Storm Oudejans
—		NED	Jurre Oudewortel
—		NED	Patrick Rato
—		NED	Jermaine Ristie
—		NED	Hugo Schulte
—		NED	Joey Smit
—		NED	Sonny Smit
—		NED	Vincent Snijder
—		NED	Jorden Verdonk
—		NED	Bilal el Yaakoubi

== Notable former players ==
- Mitchel Bakker
- Jay Gorter
- Jamie Jacobs
- Julian Rijkhoff
