= MASV =

Association football club in Arnhem, Netherlands

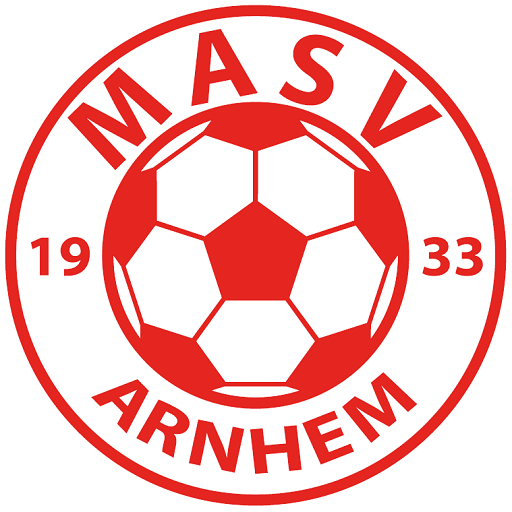
- Full name: Midden Arnhemse Sportvereniging
- Founded: 25 May 1933; 92 years ago
- Ground: Sportpark Malburgen West; Arnhem, Netherlands
- Capacity: 1,500
- Manager: Hans van de Haar
- League: Vierde Divisie
- 2024–25: Vierde Divisie C, 9th of 16
Home colours

Midden Arnhemse Sportvereniging, known as MASV is a football club from Arnhem, Netherlands. The club was founded in 1933. Its first squad has played in the Vierde Divisie since 2023.

== History ==
MASV was founded on 25 May 1933. The club's home ground is the 1,500-seated Sportpark Malburgen West, opposite Vitesse's home ground GelreDome, where the team has access to two playable pitches.

=== Struggles and controversies of the early 2010s ===
Despite its long history, the club remained relatively obscure and insignificant in the amateur football scene. The early 2010s were particularly challenging, as MASV struggled with a tarnished reputation due to frequent violent incidents and poor management. In 2012, two female fans received a two-year ban for assaulting a referee during a match involving MASV fifth team, which was subsequently expelled from the competition. Later that year, a player struck a referee in a friendly match against De Paasberg, leading to the club's provisional suspension by the KNVB. In 2013, the second team faced disciplinary action after players threatened a referee, further cementing the club's negative image. By 2014, MASV had withdrawn from the Sunday Vierde Klasse due to an inability to field a competitive team, marking a low point in its history.

=== Eef Kasteel era (2016–present) ===
In 2016, the club experienced a significant turnaround under the leadership of Eef Kasteel, a flamboyant figure known for his diverse background as a singer and poker player. Kasteel's charismatic leadership and innovative approach brought about substantial changes. He reorganised the club's management, fostering greater operational efficiency, and strengthened community ties through various events and sponsorships. Under his guidance, MASV invested heavily in youth development, enhancing training facilities and programs.

Prominent former professional players, including Tim Cornelisse, Nicky Hofs, and Jhon van Beukering, joined the club, contributing to its improved performance. In the 2016–17 season, MASV secured promotion to the Derde Klasse despite facing disciplinary setbacks, marking a significant achievement. The club's journey to the KNVB District Cup final in the 2017–18 season was another highlight, although they ultimately lost to DFS.

MASV continued its upward trajectory by winning the Derde Klasse title and gaining promotion to the Tweede Klasse. However, controversy was never far behind. In 2018–19, MASV's third team won their league under suspicious circumstances, with allegations of match-fixing due to unusually high scores in their final matches. Kasteel himself faced legal issues in 2019, including a high-profile court case where he was initially sentenced to 2.5 years in prison for attempted murder. This sentence was later reduced to three months due to self-defense claims, and Kasteel was temporarily suspended from his role but later reinstated.

In May 2023, MASV completed its transformation from a controversial, lower division club to a successful amateur club, by winning a historic promotion to the Vierde Divisie.

== Honours ==
(Note: All titles are in the "Sunday East" division.)

- Eerste Klasse
  - Winners: 2022–23 (D)
- Tweede Klasse
  - Winners: 2019–20 (I)
- Derde Klasse
  - Winners: 2018–19 (C)
- Vijfde Klasse
  - Winners: 2015–16 (F)
- Zesde Klasse
  - Winners: 2007–08 (F)
- KNVB District Cup
  - Runners-up: 2017–18
