= List of AFC Ajax affiliated clubs =

Amsterdamsche Football Club Ajax (Dutch pronunciation: [ˈaːjɑks]), also referred to as AFC Ajax, Ajax Amsterdam or simply Ajax (after the legendary Greek hero), is a professional football club from Amsterdam, Netherlands. The club is historically one of the three clubs that dominate the Dutch national football league (Eredivisie), the others being PSV and Feyenoord.

Ajax is historically one of the most successful clubs in the world; according to the IFFHS, Ajax were the seventh most successful European club of the 20th century. The club is one of the five teams that has earned the right to keep the European Cup and to wear a multiple-winner badge; they won consecutively in 1971–1973. In 1972, they completed the European treble by winning the Dutch Eredivisie, KNVB Cup, and the European Cup; to date, they are the only team to keep the European Cup and accomplish the European treble. Ajax's last international trophies were the 1995 Intercontinental Cup and the 1995 Champions League, where they defeated Milan in the final; they lost the 1996 Champions League final on penalties to Juventus.

They are also one of three teams to win the treble and the Intercontinental Cup in the same season/calendar year; This was achieved in the 1971–72 season. Ajax, Juventus and Bayern Munich are the three clubs to have won all three major UEFA club competitions. They have also won the Intercontinental Cup twice, the 1991–92 UEFA Cup, as well as the Karl Rappan Cup, a predecessor of the UEFA Intertoto Cup in 1962.

This list includes current and former football clubs who have entered partnership agreements with Ajax Amsterdam.

== Current affiliated clubs ==
=== Almere City ===
Almere City FC are a club from Almere, Flevoland, situated only 21.9 miles (35.2 km) away from Amsterdam, and playing in the Dutch Eredivisie, the 1st tier of professional football in the Netherlands. The partnership between the two clubs began on 1 July 2005, with their first contractual agreement lasting until 30 June 2010, bringing with it an intense collaborative effort between the two sides. The close geographical proximity of the two clubs, allows for young Ajax players to be loaned out to Almere without having to travel to far from their homes. Their partnership focuses on the youth teams, and exchanging emerging players from both sides, as well as sharing mutual coaching seminars and exchanging coaching methods. Several of the emerging players of Jong Ajax who require more playing time at a higher competition level than the youth leagues, are subsequently loaned to Almere City FC where they can play in the Dutch Eerste Divisie instead, in order to gain valuable playing experience. On 11 May 2010 a contract extension was agreed upon between the two clubs, extending their partnership until the summer of 2015.

On 11 October 2012, former Ajax player, Jong Ajax trainer, and then manager of Ajax U-19 Fred Grim was announced as the newly appointed manager of Almere City further strengthening the relationship between the two clubs.

=== Barcelona ===
FC Barcelona are a Spanish club playing in La Liga, the top-flight of football in Spain. The relationship between Ajax and Barcelona dates back to the early seventies, when footballing innovators Rinus Michels and Johan Cruyff made the move over to coach and play for the Catalan footballing giants. Over the years several Ajax players and managers have followed in their footsteps, and made the move to Barcelona, such as Patrick Kluivert, Marc Overmars, Frank de Boer, Ronald de Boer, Frenkie de Jong and Louis van Gaal amongst others.

On 2 June 2007, Technical director Martin van Geel announced that the two clubs would work closer together, sharing similar values and footballing philosophies, the focus of the partnership will be to exchange information amongst the technical, medical and coaching staff of the two clubs. The partnership with Barcelona is unique for Ajax, since it is the only affiliated club, where Ajax is not the mother-club. The relationship focuses more on the youth development of Barcelona players. Young players from FC Barcelona B, who are not yet ready to make the step to the first team can be loaned to Ajax for a season to obtain valuable playing time in the Eredivisie, rather than playing in the Segunda División in Spain. Former players such as Gabri and Oleguer have also moved to Amsterdam following successful stints in Barcelona as well.

On 31 January 2013 under newly appointed Technical Director at Ajax Marc Overmars, the young winger Isaac Cuenca was loaned from Barcelona for the remainder of the season, while Bojan Krkić was loaned to Ajax the season following. On 4 November 2014, an interview with Barcelona president Josep Maria Bartomeu was published in the Dutch news publication De Telegraaf, where he refers to the Spanish club as the "Son of Ajax". He explained the influence Michels and Cruijff had on the club as being imperative in creating the infrastructure and culture present at the club today.

=== Cruzeiro ===
Cruzeiro EC are a Brazilian club from Belo Horizonte, Minas Gerais playing in the Série A, the top flight of football in Brazil. The partnership between Ajax and Cruzeiro was announced on 14 December 2007, and serves as a sort springboard for Cruzeiro players who seek to play their professional football in Europe. Young players from the club are regularly invited to Amsterdam for trial periods, and in case Ajax decide to purchase a player from Cruzeiro, the Brazilian side then retain 35% proprietorship and transfer rights of the player. Furthermore, the two clubs organize exhibition matches between their senior, and more frequently their youth teams, to help promote international playing experience for their players. Both former Ajax players Zé Eduardo and Maxwell were acquired from the club in the past.

=== Beijing Guoan ===
Beijing Guoan are a Chinese club from Beijing, playing in the CSL, the top flight of football in China. On 15 December 2007 AFC Ajax and their then main sponsor Aegon announced a partnership with Beijing Guoan to take immediate effect. The purpose of the collaborative effort is to strengthen the AFC Ajax brand in China, but also to help improve the quality of the team's youth development, and to allow young talented Chinese players the opportunity to come perform in Amsterdam on trial periods.

=== Palmeiras ===
Palmeiras are a Brazilian football club from São Paulo, playing in the Série A, the top flight of football in Brazil. On 10 January 2010 it was announced by Rik van den Boog and Marcelo Solarino that AFC Ajax and Palmeiras had agreed to collaborate and to share information regarding each other's coaching, technical and medical staff. The partnership focuses primarily on improving each other's youth teams, creating an exchange program, where the youth teams participate in each other's offseason tournaments in order for the players to obtain valuable international experience and exposure. Furthermore, players from the Brazilian club are invited for trial periods in Amsterdam offering an opportunity for the players to make the move to Europe if they are able to convince during their visit at De Toekomst. Ajax also retain first choice for players that Palmeiras are looking to sell in this joint venture between the two clubs.

On 14 January 2012, Palmeiras and AFC Ajax played their first competitive match, when Ajax paid a visit to the Brazilian club for the first time since entering this partnership. The match was played at Estádio Palestra Itália, Palmeiras home stadium, where the match ended in a 1–0 win for the Brazilian side.

=== AS Trenčín ===
AS Trenčín is a Slovak club from Trenčín playing in the Fortuna Liga, the top flight of football in Slovakia. On 12 December 2012 it was announced, that Ajax and Trenčín would form a partnership, agreeing to a contract that would bind them until 2014. The Slovak club is owned by former Ajax player and Johan Cruyff's good friend Tscheu La Ling. The purpose of the partnership is to share scouting information between the two clubs, for them to keep each other informed over the developing talent in each other's respective regions. In 2013, Stanislav Lobotka was loaned to Ajax, while Gino van Kessel was sent to the Slovak club on a loan deal in return.

=== Guangzhou R&F ===
Guangzhou R&F are a Chinese club from Guangzhou playing in the CSL, the top flight of football in China. On 27 November 2017 it was announced, that Ajax and Guangzhou R&F would form a partnership, agreeing to a contract for five years.

=== Sagan Tosu ===
Sagan Tosu are a Japanese club from Tosu, Saga on the Kyushu island, playing in the J1 League, the top flight of football in Japan. On 26 January 2018 it was announced, that Ajax and Sagan Tosu would form a partnership, agreeing to a contract for three years. The purpose of the relationship is to strengthen the youth development of the Japanese club with the help of the Ajax Coaching Academy (ACA). On 11 April 2018, Ajax eSports player Bob van Uden was loaned to Sagan Tosu for a season, to compete in the e.J1League.

=== Sydney FC ===
Sydney FC are an Australian club from Sydney, New South Wales playing in the A-League, the top flight of football in Australia. On 3 April 2018, it was announced that Ajax and Sydney FC had signed an agreement for a partnership of three years. The aim is to improve the youth academy of Sydney with the help of Ajax and to give the Amsterdam club a scouting platform in the country. On 23 August 2018, Ajax marquee Siem de Jong was sent to Sydney FC on a season-long loan spell.

=== Sparta Rotterdam ===
Sparta Rotterdam is a Dutch club from Rotterdam, South Holland playing in the Eredivisie, the 1st tier of football in the Netherlands and also the same tier as Ajax. On 25 October 2018, it was announced that Ajax and Sparta had agreed to a partnership of three years, to help further develop the youth academy of the Rotterdam club and allow a path for youth players to make a transfer to Amsterdam. The Sparta Youth Academy is one of the strongest in the country, having received a four-star academic sports certification, the highest possible in the country. Despite having benefits for the Rotterdam side, the announcement received backlash in response from Sparta-supporters, mainly due to the city rivalry between Amsterdam and Rotterdam.

=== Sharjah FC ===
Sharjah FC is a United Arab Emirates club from Sharjah playing in the UAE Pro League, the top professional football league in the United Arab Emirates. On 5 January 2020, it was announced that Ajax and Sharjah had agreed to terms on an official partnership. The purpose of the partnership is to improve the youth academy of the Emirates club and to raise the skill level.

=== Pachuca ===
C.F. Pachuca is a Mexican club from Pachuca playing in the Liga MX, the top professional football league in Mexico. On 5 August 2022 it was announced that Ajax and Pachuca had agreed to terms on an official partnership. The purpose of the first partnership deal, closed by Klaas-Jan Huntelaar and Armando Martínez, is to improve the youth academy of the Mexican club and scouting in the region.

=== Gamba Osaka ===
Gamba Osaka is a Japanese club from Osaka playing in the J. League, the top professional football league in Japan. The purpose of the collaboration is to improve on identification of talent, and the development of players at an early stage.

=== Various HETT-clubs ===
Ajax have a number of partnerships with clubs from in and around Amsterdam (within approximately 35 km circumference) who fall under the HETT covenant. The HET was founded in 1946 to address the needs of clubs playing in the Hoofdklasse, Eerste Klasse and Tweede Klasse. Since the introduction of the Topklasse it has been referred to as the HETT. The HETT-clubs participate in meetings, training demonstrations at Sportpark De Toekomst and participate in the Ajax HETT-Tournament. They also share full access to the Ajax Online Academy and help scout for talent. The various partnerships are managed and overseen by Joost van Dam and Heini Otto for Ajax.

- Amsterdam Greater Area: NFC
- Abcoude: FC Abcoude
- Amsterdam: AFC, Blauw-Wit, DCG, ASV De Dijk, DWV, JOS Watergraafsmeer, OSV, AVV SDZ, WV-HEDW, VVA/Spartaan, AVV Swift, HC & FC Victoria, AVV Zeeburgia
- Amstelveen Local: Heemraad, Sporting Martinus, RODA
- Badhoevedorp: SCPB
- Beverwijk: BVV De Kennemers
- Haarlem: HFC EDO, Koninklijke HFC
- Heemskerk: ADO '20
- Hoofddorp: SV Hoofddorp
- Hoorn: HVV Hollandia
- Nieuw-Vennep: VVC Nieuw-Vennep
- Velserbroek: VSV
- Velsen-Noord: FC Velsenoord
- Weesp: FC Weesp
- Wormerveer: Fortuna Wormerveer
- Zaandam: SC Hercules Zaandam
- Almere: AS80

Outside of the region around Amsterdam, Ajax have also formed partnerships with three additional amateur clubs from the Netherlands, as well as one from Belgium.

Netherlands

- Bussum: BFC Bussum
- Nijkerk: Sparta Nijkerk
- Purmerend: FC Purmerend

Belgium

- Zaventem: KVW Zaventem

== Former affiliated clubs ==
=== Ajax Cape Town ===
Ajax Cape Town was the South African 'sister' club of Ajax, playing in the Premier Soccer League. AFC Ajax N.V. were the majority shareholders in the Cape club with 51% of its shares. In 1999 the club evolved out of the amalgamation of two previous Cape Town clubs, namely Seven Stars and Cape Town Spurs, with the latter being the club from which Ajax had acquired South African International Benni McCarthy a year prior to the merger of the two clubs. Although the club from Cape Town has not always proven to be financially profitable to Ajax, its European counterpart still maintained a positive outlook on the joint venture and foresaw a bright future for its South African associate club.

The partnership between the two clubs focused on five main points:

- Improvement of the training facility Ikamva of the South African club.
- Introduction of the Ajax philosophy and training methods.
- Improvement of the technical staff in Cape Town.
- Regular trial periods for the South African teams' players at the Amsterdam club.
- Improvement of the youth teams of Ajax Cape Town.

Since the club's inception, several young players have successfully made the step over to the Amsterdam club, such as Steven Pienaar, Eyong Enoh, Thulani Serero and Lassina Traoré.

On 28 September 2020, it was announced that AFC Ajax had sold their shares back to CEO Ari Efstathiou, following a dispute over the direction of the club, ending a 21-year relationship with the South African club.

=== Ajax Orlando Prospects ===
Ajax Orlando Prospects was an American satellite-club of AFC Ajax, which was based in Orlando, Florida, and played in the USL Premier Development League. The club was founded in 2003, and folded in 2007 due to financial difficulties. The purpose of the club was to give young footballers in America the opportunity to get recruited to play in the Netherlands for the club's Dutch counterpart. Ajax saw it as an important step to create training-camps in the United States of which the Orlando club was the forerunner. The club focused primarily on youth development and staged younger players, in hopes to find a potential signee. In 2005 former Ajax player Barry Hulshoff was announced as the club's Technical Director, and although the club has never seen any of its prospects actually make the transfer over to Amsterdam, the team has fielded talented players in its own right, including Dax McCarty, Nathan Sturgis and Pascal Millien.

=== Germinal Beerschot ===
Germinal Beerschot is a Belgian club from Antwerp playing in the Jupiler Pro League the top-flight of football in Belgium. On 27 May 1999 it was announced that AFC Ajax and KFC Germinal Beerschot had reached an agreement to form a partnership between the two clubs. Germinal Beerschot was regarded as a good club to loan out Ajax players, who were deemed not yet ready for the first team selection, while also signing young talented players from the Belgian club who were regarded as ready for the step over to Ajax. Noteworthy Ajax players who made the successful step over to Amsterdam include Jelle van Damme and Thomas Vermaelen. Further talents include Jan Vertonghen and Toby Alderweireld, all Belgian players whose shared roots lie with the club from Antwerp.

Having formed a partnership with the Belgian club since 1999, Ajax acquired a majority of the shares in the Belgian club on 16 May 2000, to become the main shareholder of the club with 72,5% of the shares. In 2003 the relationship between the two clubs began to wear, and on 13 March 2003, according to RTL Z, Ajax sold all of its shares in the club back to Belgian businessman Jos Verhaegen for the symbolic price of €1,- euro, ending the fusion of the clubs, which had proven to be a successful venture for the Amsterdam side.

=== Ashanti Goldfields ===
Ashanti Gold SC are a Ghanaian club from Obuasi, Ashanti Region playing in the Glo Premier League, the top-flight of football in Ghana. On 18 June 1999 it was announced, that AFC Ajax and the West African club from the mining town in the Ashanti region would form a partnership. The primary purpose of the partnership was to improve the youth development program at Ashanti Gold SC, as well as to help improve the club's technical program, while offering trial periods in Amsterdam for promising young talent, looking to make the step over to the Eredivisie. Following the joint venture, AFC Ajax owned 51% of the club, with the majority stake, while Ashanti Goldfields Corporation retained 49% proprietorship of the club.

In 2000, Hans van der Pluijm was announced as the newly appointed Technical Director at Ashanti Gold SC, a position he held until 2002, and in February 2001, a modern Football Academy was commissioned at the Ofori Stadium, Obuasi at a cost of US$360,000. The Ofori Stadium is the newly furbished training facility and second stadium of the Ghanaian club not far from their primary Len Clay Stadium. While several Ghanaian players had trial periods in Amsterdam, none were actually signed, and in February 2003, AFC Ajax sold their shares in the club back to Ashanti Goldfields, while still working together on the technical aspects of the club for a while, before all collaborative efforts between the two parties desisted.

=== HFC Haarlem ===
HFC Haarlem were a club from Haarlem, North Holland which last played in the Dutch Eerste Divisie, the 2nd tier of professional football in the Netherlands. The town of Haarlem is situated only 12,9 miles (20,7 km) outside of Amsterdam, and the relationship between the two clubs was considerably good. It was announced that the two clubs would begin working together in terms of helping each other when scouting for youth in 2001, and in 2006 their partnership was extended to include technical support for both clubs, as well as AFC Ajax loaning young players out to HFC Haarlem to acquire more experience playing in the Eerste Divisie. The geographical proximity of the two clubs proved to be beneficial as the young players who were loaned to Haarlem would not have to travel far from home to the new temporary club. In 2008, two years later the clubs agreed to extend their contract once more, while a new more intense program for the two teams was agreed on in 2009, under supervision of Cock Jol (brother of Martin Jol). The partnership focused on four key points.

- Ajax loans a minimum and maximum of four players to HFC Haarlem each season.
- Ajax have a say in various areas of the club's management, including Technical advisory, Club transfers, the hiring of Coaching staff, playing style and youth development.
- Ajax retain a minimum of one, and a maximum of two players on the board of advisory for the club.
- Ajax support HFC Haarlem financially, paying an annual fee to the club from Haarlem, while sharing in the profits acquired from transfers of HFC Haarlem players which are sold by AFC Ajax.

On 10 January 2010, HFC Haarlem declared bankruptcy, putting an end to the club from Haarlem, and their partnership with AFC Ajax. Following the dissolution of HFC Haarlem, Ajax focused more on its relationship with FC Omniworld (now Almere City).

=== FC Volendam ===
FC Volendam are a Dutch football club from Volendam, North Holland playing in the Dutch Eerste Divisie, the 2nd tier of professional football in the Netherlands. On 13 July 2007 it was announced that AFC Ajax and FC Volendam would enter a partnership, in order to fortify each other's youth programs with a regular exchange of the club's coaching and technical staff, entering a three-year contract.

On 30 June 2010, FC Volendam terminated the contract from their end, explaining a lack of cooperation as the reason for their termination, stating that the partnership was not noticeable enough, to justify a contract renewal. Volendam concluded that both clubs were to be seen as equal in value, and that the benefit of the partnership appeared too one-sided for them to feel a contract renewal would have benefited their side.
