= SC Buitenveldert =

Dutch football club

Coordinates: 52°20′10″N 4°51′54″E

- Full name: Sportclub Buitenveldert
- Founded: 4 June 1974; 52 years ago
- Ground: Sportpark Buitenveldert, Amsterdam, Netherlands
- Capacity: 1,000
- League: Eerste Klasse Women (2023–24); Derde Klasse Men (2023–24)
- Website: buitenveldert.com
Home colours

Sportclub Buitenveldert is a Dutch association football club based in the neighborhood Buitenveldert, in Amsterdam. It was founded in 1974. In 2023–24, the club has a women's team in the Eerste Klasse and a men's team in the Derde Klasse. The women's team has in the past made it to the Topklasse.
