= AFC '34 =

Dutch football club

- Full name: Alkmaarse Football Club '34
- Founded: 1 June 1934; 92 years ago
- Ground: Sportpark Robonsbosweg, Alkmaar
- Capacity: 1,500
- Chairman: Mirjam de Boer
- Manager: Thomas Bart
- League: Vierde Divisie
- 2025–26: Vierde Divisie A, 7th of 16
- Website: www.afc34.nl
Home colours

Alkmaarse Football Club '34, mainly known as AFC '34 is a football club based in Alkmaar, Netherlands. Founded in 1934, they are currently members of the Vierde Divisie, the fifth tier of the Dutch football league system. They play their home matches at Gemeentelijk Sportpark.

The club won the 1997 KNVB District Cup in the West 1 District.

== Famous players ==
- Mohammed Ajnane
- Phillip Cocu
- Tim Cornelisse
- Yuri Cornelisse
- Jeffrey Esser
- Indy Groothuizen
- Terry Hendriks
- Jose Fortes Rodriguez
- Jan Kooge
- Andre Krul
- Nick Kuipers
- Haris Medunjanin
- Beau Molenaar
- Arnold Oosterveer
- Alex Pastoor
- Henk Tijm
- Siem Tijm
- Hans Visser
