= Topklasse (disambiguation) =

Topklasse (English: Top Class) may refer to:

- former name (2010 to 2016) of the Derde Divisie, fourth tier football league in the Netherlands
- Topklasse (women), women's football league in the Netherlands
- Topklasse (cricket), cricket competition in the Netherlands
- SVB Topklasse, football leagues in Suriname
