= Achtste Klasse =

- Organising body: KNVB
- Founded: 1996
- Folded: 2001
- Country: Netherlands
- Confederation: UEFA
- Level on pyramid: 8
- Promotion to: Zevende Klasse

The Achtste Klasse (1996–2001) was a Dutch Association football league for men. It covered only a part of North and South Holland. The champion and the runner-up of the Achtste Klasse gained the right to promote to the Zevende Klasse. It was up to the club to use this right or not.

== History ==
The foundation of the Achtste Klasse in 1996 was the result of a major KNVB reorganization at which the regional soccer organizations were dismantled and the Netherlands was divided into 9 soccer districts. The Achtste Klasse became the lowest division of Dutch amateur football. Only Sunday District West I had an Achtste Klasse. In 2001 the number of districts was limited to 6, the Achtste Klasse was dismantled, and all Achtste Klasse teams were promoted to the Zevende Klasse or Zesde Klasse, as the restructured Zevende didn't cover all of the Netherlands either.

One of the teams in the Achtste Klasse was the college football club DSVV Ouwe Schoen from Delft, founded in 1889 as Delftsche FC. Its first and second squad had played in the Achtste Klasse, however, the second squad promoted to the Zevende Klasse, leaving the first squad behind in the Achtste until the league's closure in 2001.

SV Beemster from Middenbeemster won the 8A section championship in 1999. SV Watervogels from Den Helder played in the competition from 1996 to 2000, when it won the section championship of 8A.
