= Basil Camara =

Bissau-Guinean footballer (born 1992)

Personal information
- Full name: Basil Siuleimame Camara
- Date of birth: 29 August 1992 (age 34)
- Place of birth: Apeldoorn, Netherlands
- Height: 1.99 m (6 ft 6 in)
- Position: Centre-back

Team information
- Current team: DVS '33
- Number: 4

Senior career*
Years	Team	Apps	(Gls)
2010–2013	WSV		
2013–2014	WHC		
2014–2015	Jong Go Ahead Eagles		
2015–2020	DVS '33	131	(4)
2020–2023	TEC	67	(2)
2023–2024	IJsselmeervogels	29	(4)
2024–2025	DVS '33	16	(0)
2025–	MASV	0	(0)
- * Club domestic league appearances and goals as of 10 October 2024

Basil Siuleimame Camara (born 29 August 1992) is a footballer who plays as a centre-back for MASV. Born in the Netherlands, he is eligible to play for Guinea-Bissau.

== Early life ==
Camara was born in 1992 in the Netherlands. He grew up in Apeldoorn, the Netherlands.

== Career ==
In 2020, Camara signed for Dutch side TEC. He captained the club. He joined MASV in 2025 after playing 67 games in the Tweede Divisie and 172 in the Derde Divisie.

== Style of play ==
Camara mainly operates as a defender. He is left-footed.

== Personal life ==
Camara is of Bissau-Guinean descent. He was born to a Bissau-Guinean father.
