= Yuri Cornelisse =

Dutch footballer (born 1975)

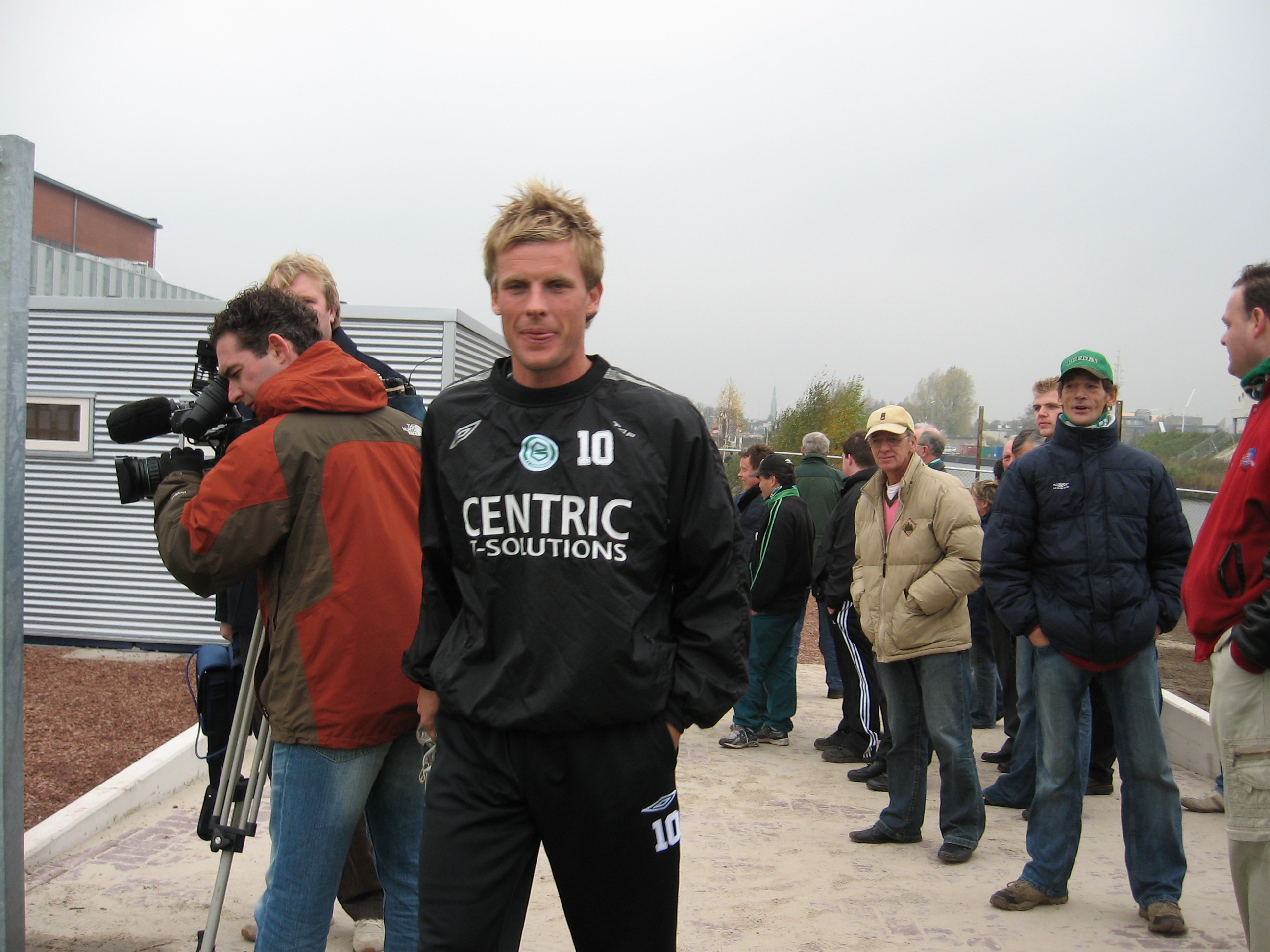
- Cornelisse with Groningen in 2006

Personal information
- Full name: Yuri Cornelisse
- Date of birth: 8 May 1975 (age 51)
- Place of birth: Alkmaar, Netherlands
- Height: 1.84 m (6 ft 0 in)
- Position: Forward

Youth career
- 1983–1992: AFC '34
- 1992–1994: AZ

Senior career*
Years	Team	Apps	(Gls)
1994–1996	AFC '34		
1996–1998	TOP Oss	64	(14)
1998–1999	Anderlecht	0	(0)
1999–2004	RKC Waalwijk	157	(27)
2004–2005	NAC Breda	33	(8)
2005–2007	Groningen	55	(8)
2007–2010	ADO Den Haag	62	(8)
Total		371	(65)
- * Club domestic league appearances and goals

Yuri Cornelisse (born 8 May 1975) is a Dutch former professional footballer who played as a striker from 1994 to 2010, notably for RKC Waalwijk.

As a footballer he also played for AFC '34, TOP Oss, Anderlecht, NAC Breda, Groningen and ADO Den Haag.

== Career ==
=== Early career ===
Cornelisse started playing football in the youth department of AFC '34 at age 8, and later moved to the youth academy of AZ, before returning to AFC '34. He started his professional career with TOP Oss, where he played for two seasons.

His performances attracted the attention of Belgian club Anderlecht, who eventually signed him in. In Belgium, Cornelisse soon suffered a fracture in his metatarsal bone in an exhibition game against his former club TOP Oss in pre-season. This prompted him to return to the Netherlands because, on the one hand, his rehabilitation took more time than planned and, on the other hand, because manager Arie Haan had been fired and his successor Jean Dockx brought about nine new players to Anderlecht. This meant that Cornelisse was free to leave the club, after making no official appearances, and he moved to RKC Waalwijk.

=== RKC Waalwijk ===
In his first season at RKC, 1999–2000, the club finished 10th but qualified for the then UEFA Intertoto Cup. The team was coached by future Tottenham Hotspur and Ajax manager Martin Jol. Cornelisse made 33 total appearances that season, in which he scored seven goals. He made his European debut in the Intertoto Cup against English club Bradford City on 16 July 2000. His club would be knocked out with the score finishing 0–3 on aggregate. In his third season at the club, RKC were represented in the Intertoto Cup once again, but were knocked out by German club 1860 Munich in the third round, 2–5 on aggregate with Cornelisse playing in both games.

Cornelisse played five seasons in Waalwijk, and finished eighth on the all-time top goalscorer list at the club with 27 goals to his name. On his time with RKC he later stated: "I played at RKC for five years. Of course that wasn't by accident. It's pretty rare these days to play for the same club for so long, but I didn't regret it for a second. I really felt at home there."

=== NAC Breda ===
On 18 December 2003, he signed with NAC Breda on a four-year contract, which meant that he would come over as a free agent on 30 June 2004. He made his debut against Utrecht on 14 August 2004 in a 3–2 home win. In the following match, Cornelisse scored his first goal for the club as NAC lost 6–2 away to Ajax. The game became mostly known for Zlatan Ibrahimović's four goals, of which one was iconic – a slaloming run past five opposition players which the commentator compared with Diego Maradona and Zinedine Zidane – that was eventually voted the Goal of the Year by Eurosport viewers. Cornelisse made 33 appearances that season in which he scored 8 goals as NAC finished 15th in the league table, avoiding relegation play-offs by three points.

=== Groningen ===
A year after joining NAC, Cornelisse moved to Groningen, signing a three-year contract. There, he mainly played as a striker. He missed a crucial penalty kick on 28 September 2006 in the second leg of the UEFA Cup first round against Partizan which meant that Groningen were knocked out of the competition. This happened after regular penalty taker Koen van de Laak – who had scored from a penalty earlier in the game – had been subbed off for Cornelisse. In the following league match, Cornelisse came on as a substitute in a 4–3 comeback win over Vitesse, contributing with an assist to Luis Suárez. After the game, he was cheered on by Groningen supporters, something he later described as one of the "best memories" from his career.

=== ADO Den Haag ===
On 9 July 2007 it was announced that Cornelisse has signed a three-year contract with ADO Den Haag.

Cornelisse announced his retirement from football on 21 October 2010. Instead, he would focus on his education to become a police officer.

== Personal life ==
He is the elder brother of Tim Cornelisse, and the uncle of Enzo Cornelisse, both also professional footballers. He retired from football to become a police officer.

== Career statistics ==
Appearances and goals by club, season and competition
Club	Season	League			KNVB Cup		Europe		Other		Total	
Club	Season	Division	Apps	Goals	Apps	Goals	Apps	Goals	Apps	Goals	Apps	Goals
TOP Oss	1996–97	Eerste Divisie	31	8	—		—		—		31	8
TOP Oss	1997–98	Eerste Divisie	33	6	—		—		—		33	6
TOP Oss	Total		64	14	—		—		—		64	14
Anderlecht	1998–99	Belgian First Division	0	0	0	0	—		—		0	0
RKC Waalwijk	1999–2000	Eredivisie	32	6	1	0	—		—		33	7
RKC Waalwijk	2000–01	Eredivisie	32	2	0	0	2 (Note: Appearances in UEFA Intertoto Cup)	0	—		34	2
RKC Waalwijk	2001–02	Eredivisie	30	7	1	0	2	0	—		33	7
RKC Waalwijk	2002–03	Eredivisie	31	9	0	0	—		—		31	9
RKC Waalwijk	2003–04	Eredivisie	32	3	0	0	—		—		32	3
RKC Waalwijk	Total		157	27	2	0	4	0	—		163	27
NAC Breda	2004–05	Eredivisie	33	8	0	0	—		—		33	8
Groningen	2005–06	Eredivisie	33	8	1	0	—		4 (Note: Appearance in Eredivisie European play-offs)	1	38	9
Groningen	2006–07	Eredivisie	22	0	2	0	2 (Note: Both appearances in UEFA Cup.)	0	2	0	28	0
Groningen	Total		55	8	3	0	2	0	6	1	66	9
ADO Den Haag	2007–08	Eerste Divisie	32	6	0	0	—		2 (Note: Appearances in Eerste Divisie promotion play-offs)	1	34	7
ADO Den Haag	2008–09	Eredivisie	23	2	2	0	—		—		25	2
ADO Den Haag	2009–10	Eredivisie	7	0	1	0	—		—		8	0
ADO Den Haag	Total		62	8	3	0	—		2	1	67	9
Career total			371	65	8	0	6	0	8	2	393	67
