= Gijs de Jong =

Dutch football administrator

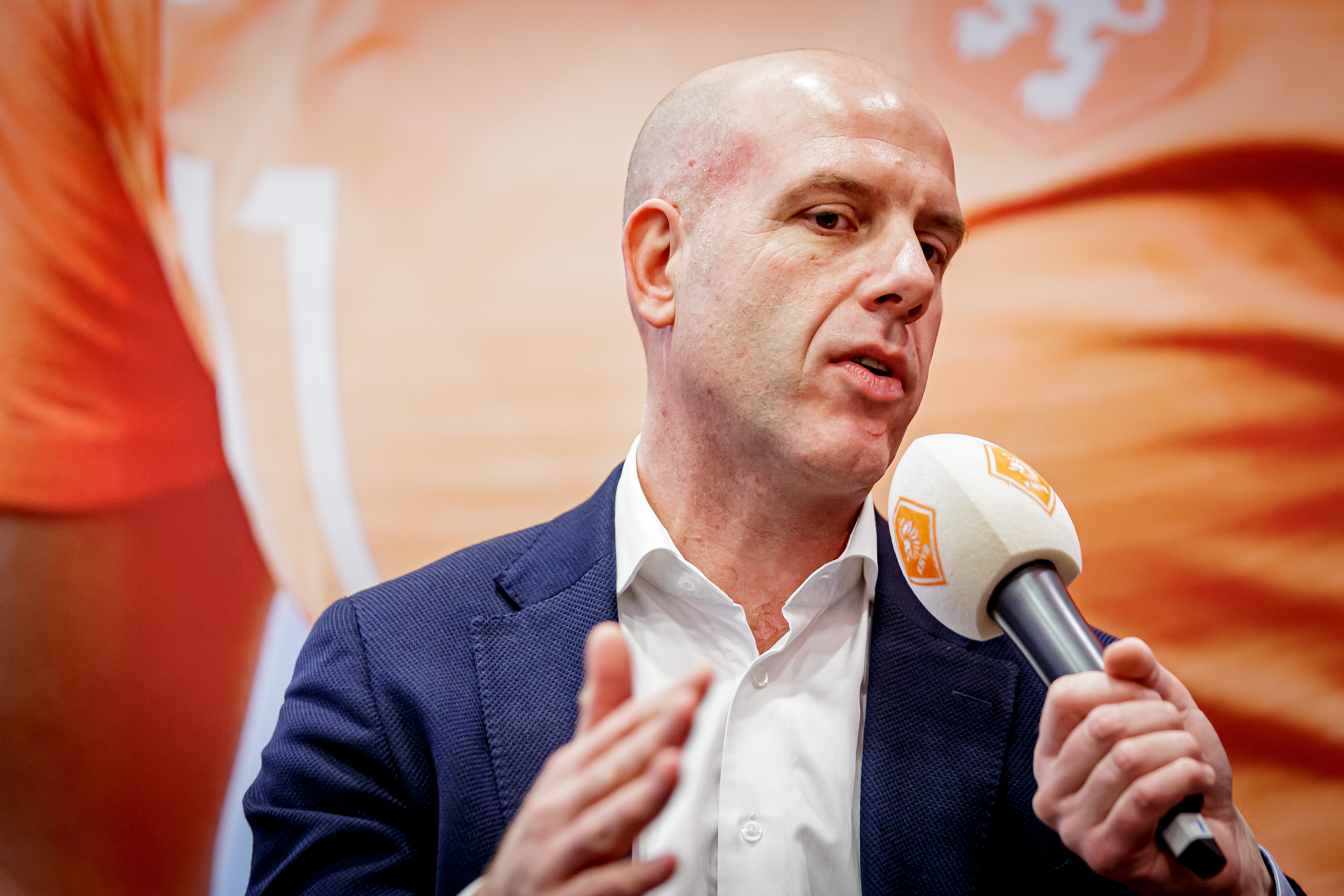
- Jong in 2020
- Born: 24 July 1972 (age 53)
- Occupation: KNVB General Secretary
- Years active: 2017–Present
- Known for: Director EURO2020

Gijs de Jong (born 24 July 1972) is a Dutch football administrator.

== Career ==
Gijs de Jong studied Public Administration at the University of Leiden from 1991 till 1996. Afterwards he became an event manager and consultant at the Amsterdam Arena. In 2003 he joined the KNVB as coordinator security affairs and public affairs. Among other things, he was responsible for stadium bans of supporters and the security of the Netherlands national football team at major tournaments. In 2010 he became Head of professional competitions at the KNVB. In 2014 he was promoted to project manager of the KNVB at the 2014 FIFA World Cup. De Jong is also a match delegate at UEFA, and previously he was delegated as match commissioner for FIFA. In addition, Gijs de Jong is a member of the Football Advisory Panel of the International Football Association Board (IFAB). IFAB manages, renews, and maintains the rules of football on behalf of the FIFA. De Jong is a member of the UEFA National Team Competitions Committee since 2017. In 2016 De Jong successfully completed the Advances Strategic Management program at the business school International Institute for Management Development (IMD) in Lausanne.

In 2014 Gijs de Jong became Director of Operations of the KNVB. In September 2017 he was appointed as General Secretary at the KNVB. The General Secretary at the KNVB is responsible for the international representation of the Dutch Football Association at FIFA and UEFA and contacts with fellow national football associations. International events are also within the duties of the General Secretary. Additionally, the General Secretary is responsible of the international strategy of the KNVB. This international strategy focuses on competitive balance, innovation (development of football rules), events, World Coaches and New Business.

Besides his position as General Secretary, Gijs de Jong is Director EURO2020 for the matches played in Amsterdam during the European Football Championship, to be held in 2021. Because of the 60th anniversary of the European Football Championship, the tournament will be played throughout Europe in 12 different stadiums. Amsterdam is one of the host cities.

De Jong led the successful bid for the Futsal Euro 2022 in Amsterdam and Groningen. He was also responsible for the bid of the Women's Champions League final 2023 in Eindhoven. This bid was assigned to the KNVB at the 44the UEFA Conference in Amsterdam.
