= Hans van de Haar =

Dutch footballer and manager (born 1975)

Personal information
- Full name: Johannes van de Haar
- Date of birth: 1 February 1975 (age 51)
- Place of birth: Amersfoort, Netherlands
- Height: 1.86 m (6 ft 1 in)
- Position: Striker

Team information
- Current team: MASV (head coach); TOP Oss (assistant)

Youth career
- Hoevelaken
- Elinkwijk
- Ajax

Senior career*
Years	Team	Apps	(Gls)
1994–1996	Haarlem	48	(8)
1996–1998	De Graafschap	46	(12)
1999	Uerdingen 05	21	(5)
1999–2001	SSV Ulm	33	(11)
2001	SW Bregenz	9	(1)
2002–2003	De Graafschap	44	(16)
2003–2005	Utrecht	56	(16)
2005–2007	RKC	49	(6)
2007–2009	ADO Den Haag	33	(9)
2008–2009	→ AGOVV (loan)	20	(5)
2009–2010	AGOVV	22	(2)
2010	Dayton Dutch Lions	11	(3)
2010–2012	Spakenburg		
2012–2013	Veensche Boys		
Total		392	(94)

Managerial career
- 2013–2016: Lienden
- 2016–2017: Spakenburg
- 2016–2018: Utrecht (assistant)
- 2018–2020: Lienden
- 2020–2024: TEC
- 2025–: TOP Oss (assistant)
- 2025–: MASV
- * Club domestic league appearances and goals

Johannes "Hans" van de Haar (born 1 February 1975) is a Dutch football manager and former player who is the head coach of Vierde Divisie club MASV, and assistant coach of Eerste Divisie club TOP Oss.

== Professional career ==
=== Netherlands, Austria & Germany ===
Van de Haar was born in Amersfoort. He played in the Dutch, German and Austrian football leagues, having played with HFC Haarlem, De Graafschap, KFC Uerdingen 05, SSV Ulm 1846, SW Bregenz, FC Utrecht and RKC Waalwijk, ADO Den Haag and AGOVV Apeldoorn. He won the KNVB Cup once with Utrecht in 2004, and subsequently played in the UEFA Cup.

=== United States ===
In May 2010, van de Haar signed a two-and-a-half-year contract to play for the new American team Dayton Dutch Lions in the USL Premier Development League. Van de Haar made his first appearance for the Dutch Lions on 15 May 2010 against the Cleveland Internationals, and scored his team's second goal in a 3–0 victory.

He returned to the Netherlands to play for SV Spakenburg following the conclusion of the 2010 PDL season in August.

== Managerial career ==
In the summer of 2013, Van de Haar became manager of Topklasse side FC Lienden. In 2016, he moved to SV Spakenburg to become the head coach of the team in the newly formed Tweede Divisie, where he was a fired on 7 January 2017.

On 8 May 2018 he was added to FC Lienden's staff for the remainder of the 2017–2018 season. He was also an assistant-coach at FC Utrecht.

In February 2020, it was announced that Van de Haar left would leave Lienden after the 2019–20 season, to join Tweede Divisie club TEC as their new manager. In January 2024, it was announced that Van de Haar and his assistant Eric Meijers would leave the club at the end of the 2023–24 season.

On 9 January 2025, Van de Haar was appointed assistant coach to Sjors Ultee at Eerste Divisie club TOP Oss. On 4 March 2025, it was announced that he would also take up the position of head coach of Vierde Divisie club MASV from the 2025–26 season, alongside his role at TOP Oss.

In August 2025, Van de Haar suffered a cerebral infarction, which kept him away from coaching duties for approximately six months. He returned to the sidelines in January 2026.

== Personal life ==
Van der Haar grew up in the Hoevelaken area and nowadays lives in Stoutenburg.

== Honours ==
Utrecht

- KNVB Cup: 2003–04
