= Football in Amsterdam =

Association football is the most popular sport, both in terms of participants and spectators, in Amsterdam.

== Introduction ==
Amsterdam is home of the Eredivisie football club AFC Ajax. The stadium Johan Cruyff Arena is the home of Ajax. It is located in the south-east of the city next to the Amsterdam Bijlmer ArenA railway station. Before moving to their current location in 1996, Ajax played their regular matches in De Meer Stadion.

== History ==
Amsterdam had a time when it was home to four professional and relatively successful football clubs. AFC Ajax, Blauw-Wit Amsterdam, AFC DWS, AVV De Volewijckers and later, FC Amsterdam, each with their own relatively long and rich histories.

== Professional clubs ==
Football/soccer teams
Club	League	Venue	Established (team)
AFC Ajax	Eredivisie	Johan Cruyff Arena; 55,000	1900
Amsterdamsche FC			1895

== Amateur clubs ==
Football/soccer teams
Club	League	Venue	Established (team)
AFC DWS			1907
ASC De Volewijckers			1912

== Defunct clubs ==
Football/soccer teams
Club	League	Established (team)	Dissolved
RAP	Eredivisie	1887	1914
FC Amsterdam	Eredivisie	1972	1982
Blauw-Wit Amsterdam		1902	2015

== Honours ==
- Netherlands football champion (41)
  - Ajax (34),
  - RAP (5)
  - DWS (1)
  - De Volewijckers (1)

== Amsterdam derbies ==
Amsterdam Derby (Stadsderby) refers to matches played between professional and amateur football clubs of Amsterdam. Such clubs include AFC, Ajax, Blauw-Wit, DWS, JOS Watergraafsmeer, Swift, De Volewijckers, VVA and Zeeburgia. An Amsterdam Derby can be an individual match or an ongoing rivalry between clubs, players and fans.

== Stadiums ==
- Johan Cruyff Arena: Hosted the 1998 UEFA Champions League Final and 2013 UEFA Europa League Final
- Amsterdam Olympic Stadium: Hosted the 1962 European Cup Final

== Famous footballers from Amsterdam ==
- Rinus Michels
- Johan Cruyff

== See also ==
- Football in the Netherlands
