= Tim Cornelisse =

Dutch footballer (born 1978)

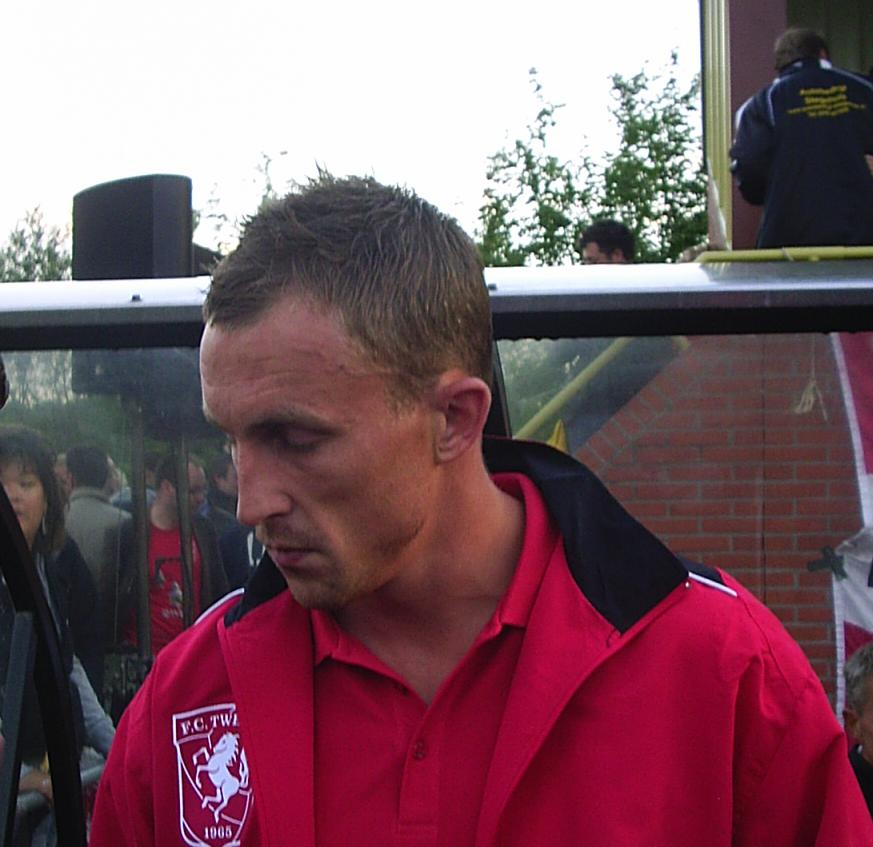
- Cornelisse with Twente in 2011

Personal information
- Full name: Tim Cornelisse
- Date of birth: 3 April 1978 (age 48)
- Place of birth: Alkmaar, Netherlands
- Height: 1.85 m (6 ft 1 in)
- Position: Right back

Youth career
- AFC '34
- AZ

Senior career*
| Years | Team | Apps | (Gls) |
| 1997–1998 | TOP Oss | 32 | (0) |
| 1998–1999 | Anderlecht | 0 | (0) |
| 1998–1999 | → RKC (loan) | 23 | (1) |
| 1999–2000 | RKC | 32 | (1) |
| 2000–2004 | Vitesse | 120 | (2) |
| 2004–2011 | Utrecht | 180 | (11) |
| 2011–2013 | Twente | 16 | (0) |
| 2013 | → Willem II (loan) | 14 | (0) |
| 2013–2015 | Willem II | 28 | (0) |
| Total | | 445 | (15) |

International career
| 2000 | Netherlands U21 | 4 | (0) |

Managerial career
- 2018–2019: MASV (caretaker)
- 2019–: Vitesse U21
- * Club domestic league appearances and goals

Tim Cornelisse (born 3 April 1978) is a Dutch former professional footballer who played as a right back. He currently works as a youth coach with Vitesse, where he manages the under-21 side together with Nicky Hofs.

== Club career ==
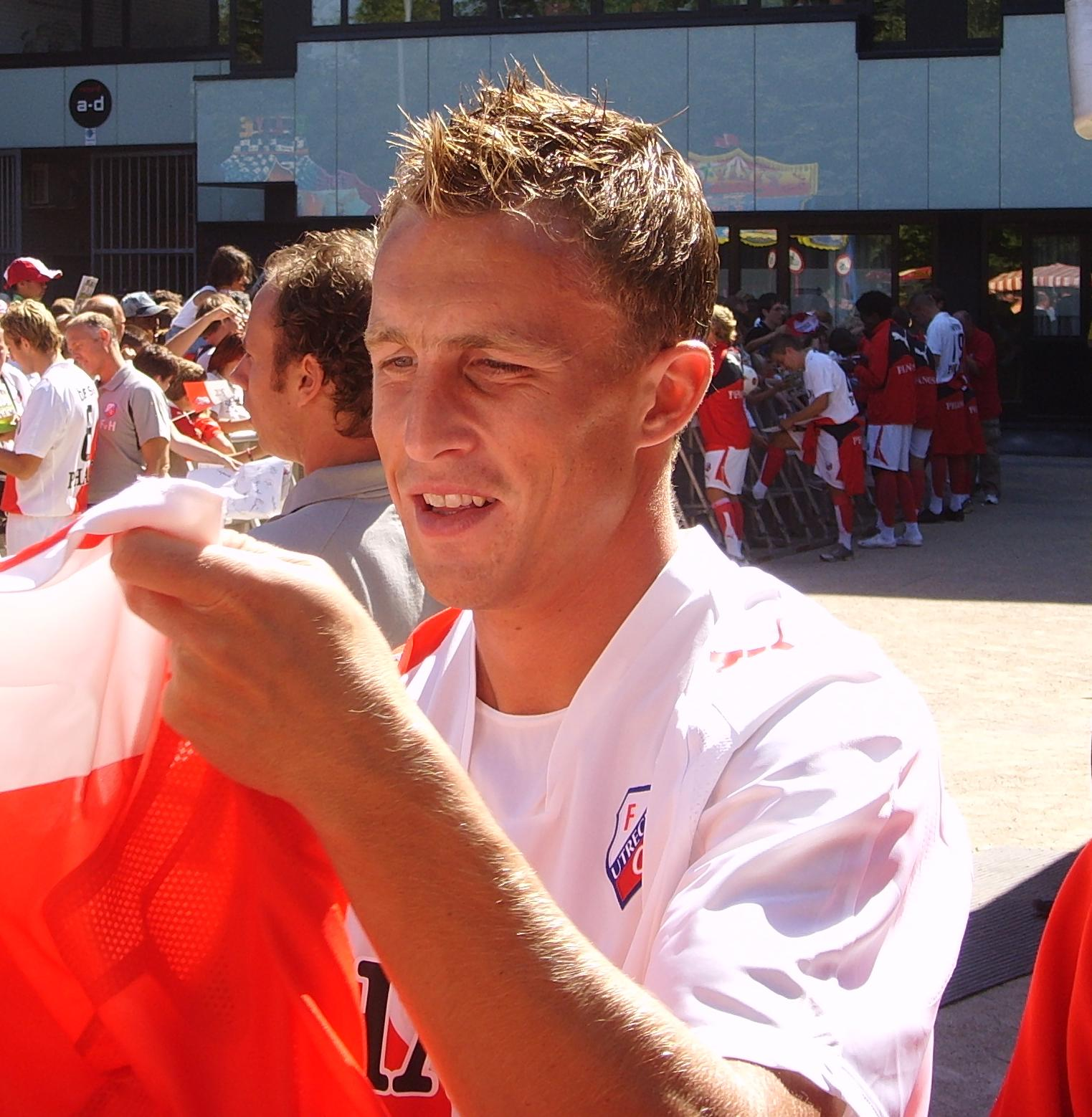
Cornelisse with Utrecht

Cornelisse started his football career with the amateurs of AFC '34. He later moved to the AZ Alkmaar youth academy. Afterwards he played at senior level for TOP Oss before being signed by Belgian club Anderlecht, who sent him on loan to RKC Waalwijk. The following season, Cornelisse was definitively signed by RKC. He became a permanent starter and made 55 appearances in which he scored twice. After two seasons with RKC, four seasons followed at Vitesse. In the 2002–03 season Cornelisse was part of an impressive run with Vitesse in the UEFA Cup, with their European campaign exceeding all expectations. In the first round, Vitesse played against Romanian club Rapid București. After a 1–1 draw at home in Arnhem, a 0–1 away win followed, which allowed Vitesse to qualify for the next round. There, the team knocked out German Bundesliga club Werder Bremen, after which Premier League club Liverpool put an end to Vitesse's European adventure that season. After his period with Vitesse, he settled with Utrecht, where he would eventually play for seven years, winning the Johan Cruyff Shield in 2004. In December 2005, Cornelisse suffered a serious knee injury that sidelined him for months. In 2010, Cornelisse was told that his expiring contract would not be extended.

On 22 March 2011, it was announced that Cornelisse would sign with Twente on a two-year contract from 2011–12 season. Although Cornelisse was utilised frequently at the start of the season due to Roberto Rosales' absence, he was used mainly as a substitute for the Venezuelan during the season. In his second season, Cornelisse was sent on loan to Willem II on 25 January 2013.

Cornelisse was allowed to practice with the first team of Vitesse during the preparation of the 2013–14 season after failing to find a new club. In August, he signed with Willem II. In May 2015, he announced his retirement after 18 years in professional football and was given a farewell match.

== International career ==
Cornelisse participated with the Netherlands under-21 team in the 2000 UEFA European Under-21 Championship.

== Managerial career ==
Cornelisse was announced as youth coach at Vitesse a week after retiring. He also made his comeback as a football player for MASV, the club where he also worked as a caretaker head coach. In 2019, Cornelisse was briefly assistant coach of the first team. From the 2020–21 season, Cornelisse coached the Vitesse U21 team together with Nicky Hofs.

== Personal life ==
He is the younger brother of Yuri Cornelisse, and the father of Enzo Cornelisse who are both professional footballers.

== Honours ==
Utrecht

- Johan Cruyff Shield: 2004

Twente

- Johan Cruijff Schaal: 2011

Willem II

- Eerste Divisie: 2013–14
