= Arnold Oosterveer =

Dutch footballer

Personal information
- Full name: Arnold Oosterveer
- Date of birth: 1 March 1959 (age 67)
- Place of birth: Groningen, Netherlands
- Height: 1.88 m (6 ft 2 in)
- Position: Sweeper

Senior career*
Years	Team	Apps	(Gls)
1984–1986	Telstar	64	(3)
1986–1988	AZ	66	(8)
1988–1991	Niort	60	(1)
1991–1992	Rennes	57	(0)
1992–1993	Valenciennes	26	(1)
1993–1996	Heerenveen	47	(1)
- * Club domestic league appearances and goals

Arnold Oosterveer (born 1 March 1959) is a Dutch former football defender.

After his career, he started working for Soccer Vision, where he became the agent for amongst others Klaas-Jan Huntelaar.
