= AFC Ajax eSports =

Dutch esports club

Ajax eSports
- Full name: Amsterdamsche Football Club Ajax eSports
- Short name: Ajax
- Divisions: FIFA
- Founded: 22 September 2016; 9 years ago
- Owner: AFC Ajax NV (Euronext Amsterdam: AJAX)
- Manager: Nick den Hamer
- Parent group: Ajax
- Website: ajax.nl/teams/ajax-esports

Amsterdamsche Football Club Ajax eSports, commonly known as Ajax eSports, or simply Ajax (Dutch pronunciation: [ˈaːjɑks]), is a Dutch professional esports club founded in 2016, and based in the city of Amsterdam in the Netherlands. The club is the esports department of Ajax.

== History ==
On September 22, 2016, Ajax launched Ajax eSports. The club acquired Koen Weijland, five-time national champion of the Netherlands, and FIFA World Champion in 2010, 2011 and 2015. He was officially given the number 39 shirt, with his arrival being announced just weeks ahead of the 'FIFA 17 XPERIENCE' on the Kalverstraat in Amsterdam. Ajax eSports also announced its participation to FIFA video gaming competitions.

== Roster ==
=== FIFA ===
ID	Name	Position	Join date
Weijland	(Netherlands) Koen Weijland	Player	September 22, 2016 – May 2018
DANI	(Netherlands) Dani Hagebeuk	Player	February 1, 2017
Vinken	(Netherlands) Lev Vinken	Player	September 21, 2017 – November 2018
Calabro	(United States) Joey Calabro	Player	April 6, 2018
AJAX Bob	(Netherlands) Bob van Uden	Player (on loan to Sagan Tosu (Japan) )	April 11, 2018
Gabinho	(Hungary) Gábor Szirtesi	Player	June 14, 2019
AjaxTjardo76	(Netherlands) Tjardo Paliama	Player	July 15, 2020
AjaxFinn	(Netherlands) Finn Donderwinkel	Player	May 19, 2021
PHzin	(Brazil) Paulo Chaves	Player	May 19, 2022

== Management ==
Name	Position
Nick den Hamer	Head of eSports

== Honours ==
=== National ===
- eDivisie : 3

2016–17, 2017–18, 2020–21

=== International ===
- FC Pro 24 Open: 1

2023–24
