= Derde Klasse (women) =

- Country: Netherlands
- Confederation: Royal Dutch Football Association
- Promotion to: Tweede Klasse
- Relegation to: Vierde Klasse

The Derde Klasse is a women's football league in the Netherlands. Teams in this league promote to the Tweede Klasse and relegate to the Vierde Klasse.

The league is organized into Saturday and Sunday divisions. Each of these are further divided into eight groups, creating 16 sections.

== Sections ==
Saturday

- Group A: West
- Group B: West
- Group C: South
- Group D: West
- Group E: East
- Group F: East
- Group G: East
- Group H: East

Sunday

- Group A: West
- Group B: West
- Group C: West
- Group D: South
- Group E: South
- Group F: South
- Group G: East
- Group H: East
