= Zevende Klasse =

- Founded: 2001
- Folded: 2010
- Country: Netherlands
- Confederation: UEFA
- Level on pyramid: 11
- Promotion to: Zesde Klasse
- Relegation to: Achtste Klasse (limited years, only in West I)

The Zevende Klasse (English: Seventh Class) was the eleventh and from 2001 through 2010 lowest tier of football in the Netherlands and the ninth tier of Dutch amateur football. The league was divided into 3 divisions, only played on Sunday and only in the North district. The league was abolished after the 2009–10 season. All remaining teams were promoted to higher, geographically appropriate divisions.

The divisions consisted of 11, 12, 13 or 14 teams. The champions and the runners-up were promoted to the Zesde Klasse but they could have refused promotion. Because the Zevende Klasse was the lowest football tier, teams were not relegated.

== Last Zevende Klasse divisions ==
District	Saturday division	Sunday division
North		Zevende Klasse A Zevende Klasse B Zevende Klasse C
