= Football in the Netherlands =

- Country: Netherlands
- Governing body: KNVB
- National teams: men's national team women's national team
- First played: 1886

National competitions
- FIFA World Cup; UEFA European Championship; UEFA Nations League

Club competitions
- League: Eredivisie; Eredivisie (women); Eerste Divisie; Cups: KNVB Cup; KNVB Women's Cup; Johan Cruyff Shield; Dutch Women's Super Cup

International competitions
- FIFA Club World Cup; FIFA Intercontinental Cup; UEFA Champions League; UEFA Women's Champions League; UEFA Europa League; UEFA Conference League; UEFA Super Cup

Football is the most popular sport in the Netherlands. To highlight the popularity of the sport, 66% of the Dutch population stated that they planned to follow UEFA Euro 2024.

Football was introduced to the Netherlands by Pim Mulier in the 19th century when in 1879, at the age of 14, he founded Haarlemsche Football Club. Over the next 30 years, football gained popularity in the Netherlands and the late 1890s and early 1900s saw the foundation of many new clubs, notably Sparta Rotterdam in 1888, which is the oldest professional football club in the country, AFC Ajax in 1900, Feyenoord Rotterdam in 1908, and PSV Eindhoven in 1913.

The Royal Dutch Football Association (KNVB) was founded on 8 December 1889 and joined FIFA in 1904 as one of the founding members alongside the Football Associations of Belgium, Denmark, France, Spain, Sweden, and Switzerland.

Professional football was introduced in 1954, with the establishment of the Dutch Professional Football Association (Nederlandse Beroeps Voetbal Bond, or NBVB). The first professional game was played on 14 August 1954 between Alkmaar '54 and SC Venlo. The KNVB had opposed professional football for a long time, but eventually submitted to pressure and merged with the NBVB in November 1954 to form a new football association and a new (professional) league.

From 1956, the top flight of Dutch football is the Eredivisie (English: Premier Division, literally Honorary Division). The second level is the Eerste Divisie (First Division). The third level is the Tweede Divisie (Second Division). Below that are two amateur divisions: the fourth level is the Derde Divisie (Third Division), formerly Topklasse, and the fifth level the Hoofdklasse. The Topklasse was launched in 2010, before that time promotion to or relegation from the Eerste Divisie was not possible. In 2016, the Topklasse was renamed Derde Divisie and the Tweede Divisie was revived.

The Netherlands national men's and women's team are usually dressed in orange and have a historic tradition of aesthetic possession football based around technical ability and attacking flair. They won the European Championship in 1988, and have competed in many European and World Cups. The men's team finished second in the 1974,1978 and 2010 World Cups and third in the UEFA Euro 1976 and 2014 World Cup tournament. They have reached many finals (1974 World Cup, 1978 World Cup, Euro 1988, 2010 World Cup) and semi-finals (Euro 1976, 1998 World Cup, Euro 2000, Euro 2004, 2014 World Cup, Euro 2024). The women's team also managed to reach the final in its just second FIFA Women's World Cup, where they reached the 2019 Women's World Cup but failed to win. This means the Netherlands is the second country in the world where both men's and women's teams reached the final of respective gender's World Cup yet failed to win both times, the other being Sweden. The women also won the Women's Euro 2017. Only the Netherlands and Germany have won both the men's and the women's European Championship.

== Structure of the competition (from the 2016–17 season) ==
Level	League(s)/Division(s)			
Professional football
1	Eredivisie; 18 clubs			
2	Eerste Divisie; 20 clubs			
Semi-professional football
3	Tweede Divisie; 18 clubs			
Amateur football
	Saturday		Sunday	
4	Derde Divisie Saturday; 18 clubs		Derde Divisie Sunday; 18 clubs	
5	Saturday Hoofdklasse A 16 clubs	Saturday Hoofdklasse B 16 clubs	Sunday Hoofdklasse A 16 clubs	Sunday Hoofdklasse B 16 clubs
6	District West 1: Saturday Eerste Klasse A 14 clubs District West 2: Saturday Eerste Klasse B 14 clubs District South 1: Saturday Eerste Klasse C 14 clubs District East: Saturday Eerste Klasse D 14 clubs District North: Saturday Eerste Klasse E 14 clubs (All divisions run in parallel)		District West 1: Sunday Eerste Klasse A 14 clubs District West 2: Sunday Eerste Klasse B 13 clubs District South 1: Sunday Eerste Klasse C 14 clubs District South 2: Sunday Eerste Klasse D 14 clubs District East: Sunday Eerste Klasse E 13 clubs District North: Sunday Eerste Klasse F 14 clubs (All divisions run in parallel)	
7	District West 1: Saturday Tweede Klasse A 14 clubs District West 1: Saturday Tweede Klasse B 14 clubs District West 2: Saturday Tweede Klasse C 14 clubs District West 2: Saturday Tweede Klasse D 14 clubs District South 1: Saturday Tweede Klasse E 14 clubs District South 1: Saturday Tweede Klasse F 14 clubs District East: Saturday Tweede Klasse G 14 clubs District East: Saturday Tweede Klasse H 14 clubs District North: Saturday Tweede Klasse I 14 clubs District North: Saturday Tweede Klasse J 14 clubs (All divisions run in parallel)		District West 1: Sunday Tweede Klasse A 14 clubs District West 1: Sunday Tweede Klasse B 14 clubs District West 2: Sunday Tweede Klasse C 14 clubs District West 2: Sunday Tweede Klasse D 13 clubs District South 1: Sunday Tweede Klasse E 14 clubs District South 1: Sunday Tweede Klasse F 14 clubs District South 2: Sunday Tweede Klasse G 14 clubs District South 2: Sunday Tweede Klasse H 14 clubs District East: Sunday Tweede Klasse I 14 clubs District East: Sunday Tweede Klasse J 14 clubs District North: Sunday Tweede Klasse K 14 clubs District North: Sunday Tweede Klasse L 14 clubs (All divisions run in parallel)	
8	District West 1 Saturday Derde Klasse A 14 clubs, Saturday Derde Klasse B 14 clubs Saturday Derde Klasse C 14 clubs, Saturday Derde Klasse D 14 clubs District West 2 Saturday Derde Klasse A 14 clubs, Saturday Derde Klasse B 14 clubs Saturday Derde Klasse C 14 clubs, Saturday Derde Klasse D 14 clubs District South 1 Saturday Derde Klasse A 14 clubs, Saturday Derde Klasse B 14 clubs Saturday Derde Klasse C 14 clubs, Saturday Derde Klasse D 14 clubs District East; Saturday Derde Klasse A 14 clubs, Saturday Derde Klasse B 14 clubs Saturday Derde Klasse C 14 clubs, Saturday Derde Klasse D 14 clubs District North; Saturday Derde Klasse A 14 clubs, Saturday Derde Klasse B 14 clubs Saturday Derde Klasse C 14 clubs, Saturday Derde Klasse D 14 clubs (All divisions run in parallel)		District West 1 Sunday Derde Klasse A 14 clubs, Sunday Derde Klasse B 14 clubs Sunday Derde Klasse C 14 clubs, Sunday Derde Klasse D 14 clubs District West 2 Sunday Derde Klasse A 15 clubs, Sunday Derde Klasse B 14 clubs Sunday Derde Klasse C 14 clubs, Sunday Derde Klasse D 14 clubs District South 1 Sunday Derde Klasse A 14 clubs, Sunday Derde Klasse B 14 clubs Sunday Derde Klasse C 14 clubs, Sunday Derde Klasse D 14 clubs District South 2 Sunday Derde Klasse A 14 clubs, Sunday Derde Klasse B 14 clubs Sunday Derde Klasse C 14 clubs, Sunday Derde Klasse D 14 clubs District East; Sunday Derde Klasse A 14 clubs, Sunday Derde Klasse B 14 clubs Sunday Derde Klasse C 14 clubs, Sunday Derde Klasse D 14 clubs District North; Sunday Derde Klasse A 12 clubs, Sunday Derde Klasse B 12 clubs Sunday Derde Klasse C 12 clubs, Sunday Derde Klasse D 12 clubs (All divisions run in parallel)	
9	District West 1 Saturday Vierde Klasse A 14 clubs, Saturday Vierde Klasse B 13 clubs, Saturday Vierde Klasse C 10 clubs, Saturday Vierde Klasse D 14 clubs, Saturday Vierde Klasse E 12 clubs, Saturday Vierde Klasse F 11 clubs, Saturday Vierde Klasse G 12 clubs District West 2 Saturday Vierde Klasse A 13 clubs, Saturday Vierde Klasse B 12 clubs, Saturday Vierde Klasse C 13 clubs, Saturday Vierde Klasse D 13 clubs Saturday Vierde Klasse E 13 clubs, Saturday Vierde Klasse F 14 clubs Saturday Vierde Klasse G 13 clubs District South 1 Saturday Vierde Klasse A 14 clubs, Saturday Vierde Klasse B 14 clubs, Saturday Vierde Klasse C 14 clubs, Saturday Vierde Klasse D 14 clubs District East; Saturday Vierde Klasse A 13 clubs, Saturday Vierde Klasse B 12 clubs, Saturday Vierde Klasse C 14 clubs, Saturday Vierde Klasse D 12 clubs, Saturday Vierde Klasse E 12 clubs District North; Saturday Vierde Klasse A 12 clubs, Saturday Vierde Klasse B 13 clubs, Saturday Vierde Klasse C 13 clubs, Saturday Vierde Klasse D 12 clubs (All divisions run in parallel)		District West 1 Sunday Vierde Klasse A 14 clubs, Sunday Vierde Klasse B 14 clubs, Sunday Vierde Klasse C 14 clubs, Sunday Vierde Klasse D 14 clubs, Sunday Vierde Klasse E 14 clubs, Sunday Vierde Klasse F 14 clubs, Sunday Vierde Klasse G 14 clubs, Sunday Vierde Klasse H 12 clubs District West 2 Sunday Vierde Klasse A 13 clubs, Sunday Vierde Klasse B 14 clubs District South 1 Sunday Vierde Klasse A 14 clubs, Sunday Vierde Klasse B 14 clubs, Sunday Vierde Klasse C 14 clubs, Sunday Vierde Klasse D 14 clubs, Sunday Vierde Klasse E 14 clubs, Sunday Vierde Klasse F 14 clubs, Sunday Vierde Klasse G 14 clubs, Sunday Vierde Klasse H 14 clubs District South 2 Sunday Vierde Klasse A 14 clubs, Sunday Vierde Klasse B 14 clubs, Sunday Vierde Klasse C 14 clubs, Sunday Vierde Klasse D 14 clubs, Sunday Vierde Klasse E 14 clubs, Sunday Vierde Klasse F 14 clubs, Sunday Vierde Klasse G 14 clubs, Sunday Vierde Klasse H 14 clubs District East; Sunday Vierde Klasse A 14 clubs, Sunday Vierde Klasse B 14 clubs, Sunday Vierde Klasse C 14 clubs, Sunday Vierde Klasse D 14 clubs, Sunday Vierde Klasse E 15 clubs, Sunday Vierde Klasse F 12 clubs, Sunday Vierde Klasse G 12 clubs, Sunday Vierde Klasse H 12 clubs District North; Sunday Vierde Klasse A 13 clubs, Sunday Vierde Klasse B 14 clubs, Sunday Vierde Klasse C 13 clubs, Sunday Vierde Klasse D 13 clubs, Sunday Vierde Klasse E 14 clubs, Sunday Vierde Klasse F 14 clubs (All divisions run in parallel)	
10	District North; Saturday Vijfde Klasse A 13 clubs, Saturday Vijfde Klasse B 12 clubs, Saturday Vijfde Klasse C 13 clubs, Saturday Vijfde Klasse D 14 clubs, Saturday Vijfde Klasse E 14 teams (All divisions run in parallel)		District West 1 Sunday Vijfde Klasse A 11 clubs, Sunday Vijfde Klasse B 13 clubs, Sunday Vijfde Klasse C 6 clubs, Sunday Vijfde Klasse D 11 clubs, Sunday Vijfde Klasse E 10 clubs District South 1 Sunday Vijfde Klasse A 14 clubs, Sunday Vijfde Klasse B 14 clubs, Sunday Vijfde Klasse C 13 clubs, Sunday Vijfde Klasse D 14 clubs District South 2 Sunday Vijfde Klasse A 14 clubs, Sunday Vijfde Klasse B 14 clubs, Sunday Vijfde Klasse C 14 clubs, Sunday Vijfde Klasse D 14 clubs, Sunday Vijfde Klasse E 13 clubs, Sunday Vijfde Klasse F 14 clubs, Sunday Vijfde Klasse G 13 clubs, Sunday Vijfde Klasse H 13 clubs, Sunday Vijfde Klasse I 13 clubs District East; Sunday Vijfde Klasse A 12 clubs, Sunday Vijfde Klasse B 11 clubs, Sunday Vijfde Klasse C 13 clubs, Sunday Vijfde Klasse D 12 clubs, Sunday Vijfde Klasse E 12 clubs, Sunday Vijfde Klasse F 11 clubs, Sunday Vijfde Klasse G 13 clubs, Sunday Vijfde Klasse H 13 clubs District North; Sunday Vijfde Klasse A 13 clubs, Sunday Vijfde Klasse B 14 clubs, Sunday Vijfde Klasse C 13 clubs, Sunday Vijfde Klasse D 13 clubs, Sunday Vijfde Klasse E 14 clubs, Sunday Vijfde Klasse F 14 clubs (All divisions run in parallel)	

== Structure of the competition (until the 2015–16 season) ==
Level	League(s)/Division(s)					
Professional football
1	Eredivisie; 18 clubs					
2	Eerste Divisie; 20 clubs					
Amateur football
	Saturday			Sunday		
3	Topklasse Saturday; 16 clubs			Topklasse Sunday; 16 clubs		
4	Saturday Hoofdklasse A 14 clubs	Saturday Hoofdklasse B 14 clubs	Saturday Hoofdklasse C 14 clubs	Sunday Hoofdklasse A 14 clubs	Sunday Hoofdklasse B 14 clubs	Sunday Hoofdklasse C 14 clubs
5	District West 1: Saturday Eerste Klasse A 14 clubs District West 2: Saturday Eerste Klasse B 14 clubs District South 1: Saturday Eerste Klasse C 14 clubs District East: Saturday Eerste Klasse D 14 clubs District North: Saturday Eerste Klasse E 14 clubs (All divisions run in parallel)			District West 1: Sunday Eerste Klasse A 14 clubs District West 2: Sunday Eerste Klasse B 14 clubs District South 1: Sunday Eerste Klasse C 14 clubs District South 2: Sunday Eerste Klasse D 14 clubs District East: Sunday Eerste Klasse E 14 clubs District North: Sunday Eerste Klasse F 14 clubs (All divisions run in parallel)		
6	District West 1: Saturday Tweede Klasse A 14 clubs District West 1: Saturday Tweede Klasse B 14 clubs District West 2: Saturday Tweede Klasse C 14 clubs District West 2: Saturday Tweede Klasse D 14 clubs District South 1: Saturday Tweede Klasse E 14 clubs District South 1: Saturday Tweede Klasse F 14 clubs District East: Saturday Tweede Klasse G 14 clubs District East: Saturday Tweede Klasse H 14 clubs District North: Saturday Tweede Klasse I 14 clubs District North: Saturday Tweede Klasse J 14 clubs (All divisions run in parallel)			District West 1: Sunday Tweede Klasse A 14 clubs District West 1: Sunday Tweede Klasse B 14 clubs District West 2: Sunday Tweede Klasse C 14 clubs District West 2: Sunday Tweede Klasse D 14 clubs District South 1: Sunday Tweede Klasse E 14 clubs District South 1: Sunday Tweede Klasse F 14 clubs District South 2: Sunday Tweede Klasse G 14 clubs District South 2: Sunday Tweede Klasse H 14 clubs District East: Sunday Tweede Klasse I 14 clubs District East: Sunday Tweede Klasse J 14 clubs District North: Sunday Tweede Klasse K 14 clubs District North: Sunday Tweede Klasse L 14 clubs (All divisions run in parallel)		
7	District West 1 Saturday Derde Klasse A 12 clubs, Saturday Derde Klasse B 12 clubs Saturday Derde Klasse C 12 clubs, Saturday Derde Klasse D 12 clubs District West 2 Saturday Derde Klasse A 12 clubs, Saturday Derde Klasse B 12 clubs Saturday Derde Klasse C 12 clubs, Saturday Derde Klasse D 12 clubs District South 1 Saturday Derde Klasse A 12 clubs, Saturday Derde Klasse B 12 clubs Saturday Derde Klasse C 12 clubs, Saturday Derde Klasse D 12 clubs District East; Saturday Derde Klasse A 12 clubs, Saturday Derde Klasse B 12 clubs Saturday Derde Klasse C 12 clubs, Saturday Derde Klasse D 12 clubs District North; Saturday Derde Klasse A 12 clubs, Saturday Derde Klasse B 12 clubs Saturday Derde Klasse C 12 clubs, Saturday Derde Klasse D 12 clubs (All divisions run in parallel)			District West 1 Sunday Derde Klasse A 12 clubs, Sunday Derde Klasse B 12 clubs Sunday Derde Klasse C 12 clubs, Sunday Derde Klasse D 12 clubs District West 2 Sunday Derde Klasse A 12 clubs, Sunday Derde Klasse B 12 clubs Sunday Derde Klasse C 12 clubs, Sunday Derde Klasse D 12 clubs District South 1 Sunday Derde Klasse A 12 clubs, Sunday Derde Klasse B 12 clubs Sunday Derde Klasse C 12 clubs, Sunday Derde Klasse D 12 clubs District South 2 Sunday Derde Klasse A 12 clubs, Sunday Derde Klasse B 12 clubs Sunday Derde Klasse C 12 clubs, Sunday Derde Klasse D 12 clubs District East; Sunday Derde Klasse A 12 clubs, Sunday Derde Klasse B 12 clubs Sunday Derde Klasse C 12 clubs, Sunday Derde Klasse D 12 clubs District North; Sunday Derde Klasse A 12 clubs, Sunday Derde Klasse B 12 clubs Sunday Derde Klasse C 12 clubs, Sunday Derde Klasse D 12 clubs (All divisions run in parallel)		
8	District West 1 Saturday Vierde Klasse A 12 clubs, Saturday Vierde Klasse B 12 clubs, Saturday Vierde Klasse C 12 clubs, Saturday Vierde Klasse D 12 clubs, Saturday Vierde Klasse E 12 clubs, Saturday Vierde Klasse F 12 clubs, Saturday Vierde Klasse G 12 clubs, Saturday Vierde Klasse H 12 clubs District West 2 Saturday Vierde Klasse A 12 clubs, Saturday Vierde Klasse B 12 clubs, Saturday Vierde Klasse C 12 clubs, Saturday Vierde Klasse D 12 clubs District South 1 Saturday Vierde Klasse A 12 clubs, Saturday Vierde Klasse B 12 clubs, Saturday Vierde Klasse C 12 clubs, Saturday Vierde Klasse D 12 clubs, Saturday Vierde Klasse E 12 clubs District East; Saturday Vierde Klasse A 12 clubs, Saturday Vierde Klasse B 12 clubs, Saturday Vierde Klasse C 12 clubs, Saturday Vierde Klasse D 12 clubs, Saturday Vierde Klasse E 12 clubs District North; Saturday Vierde Klasse A 12 clubs, Saturday Vierde Klasse B 12 clubs, Saturday Vierde Klasse C 12 clubs, Saturday Vierde Klasse D 12 clubs (All divisions run in parallel)			District West 1 Sunday Vierde Klasse A 12 clubs, Sunday Vierde Klasse B 12 clubs, Sunday Vierde Klasse C 12 clubs, Sunday Vierde Klasse D 12 clubs, Sunday Vierde Klasse E 12 clubs, Sunday Vierde Klasse F 12 clubs, Sunday Vierde Klasse G 12 clubs, Sunday Vierde Klasse H 12 clubs District West 2 Sunday Vierde Klasse A 12 clubs, Sunday Vierde Klasse B 12 clubs, Sunday Vierde Klasse C 12 clubs, Sunday Vierde Klasse D 12 clubs, Sunday Vierde Klasse E 12 clubs, Sunday Vierde Klasse F 12 clubs District South 1 Sunday Vierde Klasse A 12 clubs, Sunday Vierde Klasse B 12 clubs, Sunday Vierde Klasse C 12 clubs, Sunday Vierde Klasse D 12 clubs, Sunday Vierde Klasse E 12 clubs, Sunday Vierde Klasse F 12 clubs, Sunday Vierde Klasse G 12 clubs, Sunday Vierde Klasse H 12 clubs District South 2 Sunday Vierde Klasse A 12 clubs, Sunday Vierde Klasse B 12 clubs, Sunday Vierde Klasse C 12 clubs, Sunday Vierde Klasse D 12 clubs, Sunday Vierde Klasse E 12 clubs, Sunday Vierde Klasse F 12 clubs, Sunday Vierde Klasse G 12 clubs, Sunday Vierde Klasse H 12 clubs District East; Sunday Vierde Klasse A 12 clubs, Sunday Vierde Klasse B 12 clubs, Sunday Vierde Klasse C 12 clubs, Sunday Vierde Klasse D 12 clubs, Sunday Vierde Klasse E 12 clubs, Sunday Vierde Klasse F 12 clubs, Sunday Vierde Klasse G 12 clubs, Sunday Vierde Klasse H 12 clubs District North; Sunday Vierde Klasse A 12 clubs, Sunday Vierde Klasse B 12 clubs, Sunday Vierde Klasse C 12 clubs, Sunday Vierde Klasse D 12 clubs, Sunday Vierde Klasse E 12 clubs, Sunday Vierde Klasse F 12 clubs (All divisions run in parallel)		
9	District West 1 Saturday Vijfde Klasse A 12 clubs, Saturday Vijfde Klasse B 12 clubs, Saturday Vijfde Klasse C 12 clubs District North; Saturday Vijfde Klasse A 12 clubs, Saturday Vijfde Klasse B 12 clubs, Saturday Vijfde Klasse C 12 clubs, Saturday Vijfde Klasse D 12 clubs (All divisions run in parallel)			District West 1 Sunday Vijfde Klasse A 12 clubs, Sunday Vijfde Klasse B 12 clubs, Sunday Vijfde Klasse C 12 clubs, Sunday Vijfde Klasse D 12 clubs, Sunday Vijfde Klasse E 12 clubs, Sunday Vijfde Klasse F 12 clubs, Sunday Vijfde Klasse G 12 clubs, Sunday Vijfde Klasse H 12 clubs District West 2 Sunday Vijfde Klasse A 12 clubs, Sunday Vijfde Klasse B 12 clubs, Sunday Vijfde Klasse C 12 clubs, Sunday Vijfde Klasse D 12 clubs District South 1 Sunday Vijfde Klasse A 12 clubs, Sunday Vijfde Klasse B 12 clubs, Sunday Vijfde Klasse C 12 clubs, Sunday Vijfde Klasse D 12 clubs, Sunday Vijfde Klasse E 12 clubs, Sunday Vijfde Klasse F 12 clubs, Sunday Vijfde Klasse G 12 clubs, Sunday Vijfde Klasse H 12 clubs, Sunday Vijfde Klasse I 12 clubs, Sunday Vijfde Klasse J 12 clubs, District South 2 Sunday Vijfde Klasse A 12 clubs, Sunday Vijfde Klasse B 12 clubs, Sunday Vijfde Klasse C 12 clubs, Sunday Vijfde Klasse D 12 clubs, Sunday Vijfde Klasse E 12 clubs, Sunday Vijfde Klasse F 12 clubs, Sunday Vijfde Klasse G 12 clubs, Sunday Vijfde Klasse H 12 clubs District East; Sunday Vijfde Klasse A 12 clubs, Sunday Vijfde Klasse B 12 clubs, Sunday Vijfde Klasse C 12 clubs, Sunday Vijfde Klasse D 12 clubs, Sunday Vijfde Klasse E 12 clubs, Sunday Vijfde Klasse F 12 clubs, Sunday Vijfde Klasse G 12 clubs, Sunday Vijfde Klasse H 12 clubs District North; Sunday Vijfde Klasse A 12 clubs, Sunday Vijfde Klasse B 12 clubs, Sunday Vijfde Klasse C 12 clubs, Sunday Vijfde Klasse D 12 clubs, Sunday Vijfde Klasse E 12 clubs, Sunday Vijfde Klasse F 12 clubs (All divisions run in parallel)		
10	District North; Saturday Zesde Klasse A 13 clubs, Saturday Zesde Klasse B 12 clubs, Saturday Zesde Klasse C 11 clubs, Saturday Zesde Klasse D 13 clubs, Saturday Zesde Klasse E 14 clubs (All divisions ran in parallel)			District West 1 Sunday Zesde Klasse A 12 clubs, Sunday Zesde Klasse B 14 clubs, Sunday Zesde Klasse C 14 clubs, Sunday Zesde Klasse D 12 clubs District South 2 Sunday Zesde Klasse A 12 clubs, Sunday Zesde Klasse B 11 clubs, Sunday Zesde Klasse C 11 clubs, Sunday Zesde Klasse D 11 clubs, Sunday Zesde Klasse E 12 clubs, Sunday Zesde Klasse F 11 clubs, Sunday Zesde Klasse G 12 clubs District East; Sunday Zesde Klasse A 12 clubs, Sunday Zesde Klasse B 14 clubs, Sunday Zesde Klasse C 14 clubs, Sunday Zesde Klasse D 14 clubs, Sunday Zesde Klasse E 12 clubs, Sunday Zesde Klasse F 12 clubs District North; Sunday Zesde Klasse A 12 clubs, Sunday Zesde Klasse B 12 clubs, Sunday Zesde Klasse C 12 clubs, Sunday Zesde Klasse D 14 clubs (All divisions ran in parallel)		

- Zesde Klasse was abolished in 2015.

== Structure of the competition (until the 2009–10 season) ==
Level	League(s)/Division(s)					
1	Eredivisie; 18 clubs					
2	Eerste Divisie; 20 clubs					
	Saturday			Sunday		
3	Saturday Hoofdklasse A 14 clubs	Saturday Hoofdklasse B 14 clubs	Saturday Hoofdklasse C 14 clubs	Sunday Hoofdklasse A 14 clubs	Sunday Hoofdklasse B 14 clubs	Sunday Hoofdklasse C 14 clubs
4	District West 1: Saturday Eerste Klasse A 12 clubs District West 2: Saturday Eerste Klasse B 12 clubs District South 1: Saturday Eerste Klasse C 12 clubs District East: Saturday Eerste Klasse D 12 clubs District North: Saturday Eerste Klasse E 12 clubs (All divisions run in parallel)			District West 1: Sunday Eerste Klasse A 12 clubs District West 2: Sunday Eerste Klasse B 12 clubs District South 1: Sunday Eerste Klasse C 12 clubs District South 2: Sunday Eerste Klasse D 12 clubs District East: Sunday Eerste Klasse E 12 clubs District North: Sunday Eerste Klasse F 12 clubs (All divisions run in parallel)		
5	District West 1: Saturday Tweede Klasse A 12 clubs District West 1: Saturday Tweede Klasse B 12 clubs District West 2: Saturday Tweede Klasse C 12 clubs District West 2: Saturday Tweede Klasse D 12 clubs District South 1: Saturday Tweede Klasse E 12 clubs District South 1: Saturday Tweede Klasse F 12 clubs District East: Saturday Tweede Klasse G 12 clubs District East: Saturday Tweede Klasse H 12 clubs District North: Saturday Tweede Klasse I 12 clubs District North: Saturday Tweede Klasse J 12 clubs (All divisions run in parallel)			District West 1: Sunday Tweede Klasse A 12 clubs District West 1: Sunday Tweede Klasse B 12 clubs District West 2: Sunday Tweede Klasse C 12 clubs District West 2: Sunday Tweede Klasse D 12 clubs District South 1: Sunday Tweede Klasse E 12 clubs District South 1: Sunday Tweede Klasse F 12 clubs District South 2: Sunday Tweede Klasse G 12 clubs District South 2: Sunday Tweede Klasse H 12 clubs District East: Sunday Tweede Klasse I 12 clubs District East: Sunday Tweede Klasse J 12 clubs District North: Sunday Tweede Klasse K 12 clubs District North: Sunday Tweede Klasse L 12 clubs (All divisions run in parallel)		
6	District West 1 Saturday Derde Klasse A 12 clubs, Saturday Derde Klasse B 12 clubs Saturday Derde Klasse C 12 clubs, Saturday Derde Klasse D 12 clubs District West 2 Saturday Derde Klasse A 12 clubs, Saturday Derde Klasse B 12 clubs Saturday Derde Klasse C 12 clubs, Saturday Derde Klasse D 12 clubs District South 1 Saturday Derde Klasse A 12 clubs, Saturday Derde Klasse B 12 clubs Saturday Derde Klasse C 12 clubs, Saturday Derde Klasse D 12 clubs District East; Saturday Derde Klasse A 12 clubs, Saturday Derde Klasse B 12 clubs Saturday Derde Klasse C 12 clubs, Saturday Derde Klasse D 12 clubs District North; Saturday Derde Klasse A 12 clubs, Saturday Derde Klasse B 12 clubs Saturday Derde Klasse C 12 clubs, Saturday Derde Klasse D 12 clubs (All divisions run in parallel)			District West 1 Sunday Derde Klasse A 12 clubs, Sunday Derde Klasse B 12 clubs Sunday Derde Klasse C 12 clubs, Sunday Derde Klasse D 12 clubs District West 2 Sunday Derde Klasse A 12 clubs, Sunday Derde Klasse B 12 clubs Sunday Derde Klasse C 12 clubs, Sunday Derde Klasse D 12 clubs District South 1 Sunday Derde Klasse A 12 clubs, Sunday Derde Klasse B 12 clubs Sunday Derde Klasse C 12 clubs, Sunday Derde Klasse D 12 clubs District South 2 Sunday Derde Klasse A 12 clubs, Sunday Derde Klasse B 12 clubs Sunday Derde Klasse C 12 clubs, Sunday Derde Klasse D 12 clubs District East; Sunday Derde Klasse A 12 clubs, Sunday Derde Klasse B 12 clubs Sunday Derde Klasse C 12 clubs, Sunday Derde Klasse D 12 clubs District North; Sunday Derde Klasse A 12 clubs, Sunday Derde Klasse B 12 clubs Sunday Derde Klasse C 12 clubs, Sunday Derde Klasse D 12 clubs (All divisions run in parallel)		
7	District West 1 Saturday Vierde Klasse A 12 clubs, Saturday Vierde Klasse B 12 clubs, Saturday Vierde Klasse C 12 clubs, Saturday Vierde Klasse D 12 clubs, Saturday Vierde Klasse E 12 clubs, Saturday Vierde Klasse F 12 clubs, Saturday Vierde Klasse G 12 clubs, Saturday Vierde Klasse H 12 clubs District West 2 Saturday Vierde Klasse A 12 clubs, Saturday Vierde Klasse B 12 clubs, Saturday Vierde Klasse C 12 clubs, Saturday Vierde Klasse D 12 clubs District South 1 Saturday Vierde Klasse A 12 clubs, Saturday Vierde Klasse B 12 clubs, Saturday Vierde Klasse C 12 clubs, Saturday Vierde Klasse D 12 clubs, Saturday Vierde Klasse E 12 clubs District East; Saturday Vierde Klasse A 12 clubs, Saturday Vierde Klasse B 12 clubs, Saturday Vierde Klasse C 12 clubs, Saturday Vierde Klasse D 12 clubs, Saturday Vierde Klasse E 12 clubs District North; Saturday Vierde Klasse A 12 clubs, Saturday Vierde Klasse B 12 clubs, Saturday Vierde Klasse C 12 clubs, Saturday Vierde Klasse D 12 clubs (All divisions run in parallel)			District West 1 Sunday Vierde Klasse A 12 clubs, Sunday Vierde Klasse B 12 clubs, Sunday Vierde Klasse C 12 clubs, Sunday Vierde Klasse D 12 clubs, Sunday Vierde Klasse E 12 clubs, Sunday Vierde Klasse F 12 clubs, Sunday Vierde Klasse G 12 clubs, Sunday Vierde Klasse H 12 clubs District West 2 Sunday Vierde Klasse A 12 clubs, Sunday Vierde Klasse B 12 clubs, Sunday Vierde Klasse C 12 clubs, Sunday Vierde Klasse D 12 clubs, Sunday Vierde Klasse E 12 clubs, Sunday Vierde Klasse F 12 clubs District South 1 Sunday Vierde Klasse A 12 clubs, Sunday Vierde Klasse B 12 clubs, Sunday Vierde Klasse C 12 clubs, Sunday Vierde Klasse D 12 clubs, Sunday Vierde Klasse E 12 clubs, Sunday Vierde Klasse F 12 clubs, Sunday Vierde Klasse G 12 clubs, Sunday Vierde Klasse H 12 clubs District South 2 Sunday Vierde Klasse A 12 clubs, Sunday Vierde Klasse B 12 clubs, Sunday Vierde Klasse C 12 clubs, Sunday Vierde Klasse D 12 clubs, Sunday Vierde Klasse E 12 clubs, Sunday Vierde Klasse F 12 clubs, Sunday Vierde Klasse G 12 clubs, Sunday Vierde Klasse H 12 clubs District East; Sunday Vierde Klasse A 12 clubs, Sunday Vierde Klasse B 12 clubs, Sunday Vierde Klasse C 12 clubs, Sunday Vierde Klasse D 12 clubs, Sunday Vierde Klasse E 12 clubs, Sunday Vierde Klasse F 12 clubs, Sunday Vierde Klasse G 12 clubs, Sunday Vierde Klasse H 12 clubs District North; Sunday Vierde Klasse A 12 clubs, Sunday Vierde Klasse B 12 clubs, Sunday Vierde Klasse C 12 clubs, Sunday Vierde Klasse D 12 clubs, Sunday Vierde Klasse E 12 clubs, Sunday Vierde Klasse F 12 clubs (All divisions run in parallel)		
8	District West 1 Saturday Vijfde Klasse A 12 clubs, Saturday Vijfde Klasse B 12 clubs, Saturday Vijfde Klasse C 12 clubs District West 2 Saturday Vijfde Klasse A 12 clubs, Saturday Vijfde Klasse B 12 clubs, Saturday Vijfde Klasse C 12 clubs, Saturday Vijfde Klasse D 12 clubs District North; Saturday Vijfde Klasse A 12 clubs, Saturday Vijfde Klasse B 12 clubs, Saturday Vijfde Klasse C 12 clubs, Saturday Vijfde Klasse D 12 clubs (All divisions run in parallel)			District West 1 Sunday Vijfde Klasse A 12 clubs, Sunday Vijfde Klasse B 12 clubs, Sunday Vijfde Klasse C 12 clubs, Sunday Vijfde Klasse D 12 clubs, Sunday Vijfde Klasse E 12 clubs, Sunday Vijfde Klasse F 12 clubs, Sunday Vijfde Klasse G 12 clubs, Sunday Vijfde Klasse H 12 clubs District West 2 Sunday Vijfde Klasse A 12 clubs, Sunday Vijfde Klasse B 12 clubs, Sunday Vijfde Klasse C 12 clubs, Sunday Vijfde Klasse D 12 clubs District South 1 Sunday Vijfde Klasse A 12 clubs, Sunday Vijfde Klasse B 12 clubs, Sunday Vijfde Klasse C 12 clubs, Sunday Vijfde Klasse D 12 clubs, Sunday Vijfde Klasse E 12 clubs, Sunday Vijfde Klasse F 12 clubs, Sunday Vijfde Klasse G 12 clubs, Sunday Vijfde Klasse H 12 clubs, Sunday Vijfde Klasse I 12 clubs, Sunday Vijfde Klasse J 12 clubs, District South 2 Sunday Vijfde Klasse A 12 clubs, Sunday Vijfde Klasse B 12 clubs, Sunday Vijfde Klasse C 12 clubs, Sunday Vijfde Klasse D 12 clubs, Sunday Vijfde Klasse E 12 clubs, Sunday Vijfde Klasse F 12 clubs, Sunday Vijfde Klasse G 12 clubs, Sunday Vijfde Klasse H 12 clubs District East; Sunday Vijfde Klasse A 12 clubs, Sunday Vijfde Klasse B 12 clubs, Sunday Vijfde Klasse C 12 clubs, Sunday Vijfde Klasse D 12 clubs, Sunday Vijfde Klasse E 12 clubs, Sunday Vijfde Klasse F 12 clubs, Sunday Vijfde Klasse G 12 clubs, Sunday Vijfde Klasse H 12 clubs District North; Sunday Vijfde Klasse A 12 clubs, Sunday Vijfde Klasse B 12 clubs, Sunday Vijfde Klasse C 12 clubs, Sunday Vijfde Klasse D 12 clubs, Sunday Vijfde Klasse E 12 clubs, Sunday Vijfde Klasse F 12 clubs (All divisions run in parallel)		
9	District North; Saturday Zesde Klasse A 13 clubs, Saturday Zesde Klasse B 12 clubs, Saturday Zesde Klasse C 11 clubs, Saturday Zesde Klasse D 13 clubs, Saturday Zesde Klasse E 14 clubs (All divisions ran in parallel)			District West 1 Sunday Zesde Klasse A 12 clubs, Sunday Zesde Klasse B 14 clubs, Sunday Zesde Klasse C 14 clubs, Sunday Zesde Klasse D 12 clubs District South 2 Sunday Zesde Klasse A 12 clubs, Sunday Zesde Klasse B 11 clubs, Sunday Zesde Klasse C 11 clubs, Sunday Zesde Klasse D 11 clubs, Sunday Zesde Klasse E 12 clubs, Sunday Zesde Klasse F 11 clubs, Sunday Zesde Klasse G 12 clubs District East; Sunday Zesde Klasse A 12 clubs, Sunday Zesde Klasse B 14 clubs, Sunday Zesde Klasse C 14 clubs, Sunday Zesde Klasse D 14 clubs, Sunday Zesde Klasse E 12 clubs, Sunday Zesde Klasse F 12 clubs District North; Sunday Zesde Klasse A 12 clubs, Sunday Zesde Klasse B 12 clubs, Sunday Zesde Klasse C 12 clubs, Sunday Zesde Klasse D 14 clubs (All divisions ran in parallel)		
10				District North; Sunday Zevende Klasse A 11 clubs, Sunday Zevende Klasse B 11 clubs, Sunday Zevende Klasse C 11 clubs (All divisions ran in parallel)		

- Zevende Klasse was abolished in 2010.

== Competition finals ==
The following 25 European finals (club and international tournaments) took place at Dutch venues, or are scheduled to take place at them:

Those which involved a Dutch side are marked with an asterisk (*)

- 1962 European Cup final, Olympisch Stadion – (Attendance: 65,000)
- 1963 European Cup Winners' Cup final, De Kuip – (Attendance: 49,000)
- 1968 European Cup Winners' Cup final, De Kuip – (Attendance: 53,000)
- 1972 European Cup final,* De Kuip – (Attendance: 67,000)
- 1973 European Super Cup,* Olympisch Stadion – second leg (Attendance: 25,000)
- 1974 European Cup Winners' Cup final, De Kuip – (Attendance: 4,000)
- 1974 UEFA Cup final,* De Kuip – second leg (Attendance: 59,317)
- 1975 UEFA Cup final,* Diekman Stadion – second leg (Attendance: 21,767)
- 1977 European Cup Winners' Cup final, Olympisch Stadion – (Attendance: 66,000)
- 1978 UEFA Cup final,* Philips Stadion – second leg (Attendance: 27,000)
- 1981 UEFA Cup final,* Olympisch Stadion – second leg (Attendance: 28,500)
- 1982 European Cup final, De Kuip – (Attendance: 46,000)
- 1985 European Cup Winners' Cup final, De Kuip – (Attendance: 38,500)
- 1987 European Super Cup,* De Meer Stadium – first leg (Attendance: 27,000)
- 1988 European Super Cup,* Philips Stadion – second leg (Attendance: 17,100)
- 1991 European Cup Winners' Cup final, De Kuip – (Attendance: 43,500)
- 1992 UEFA Cup final,* Olympisch Stadion – second leg (Attendance: 42,000)
- 1995 UEFA Super Cup,* Olympisch Stadion – second leg (Attendance: 23,000)
- 1997 UEFA Cup Winners' Cup final, De Kuip – (Attendance: 52,000)
- 1998 UEFA Champions League final, Amsterdam Arena – (Attendance: 48,500)
- UEFA Euro 2000 final, De Kuip – (Attendance: 50,000)
- 2002 UEFA Cup final,* De Kuip – (Attendance: 45,611)
- 2006 UEFA Cup final, Philips Stadion – (Attendance: 33,100)
- 2013 UEFA Europa League final, Amsterdam Arena (Attendance: 46,163)
- 2023 UEFA Nations League final, De Kuip – (Attendance: 41,110)

== Women's football ==
More woman play football than any other sport in the Netherlands.

== Futsal ==
The top division for Futsal in the Netherlands are the Futsal Eredivisie and the Futsal Eredivisie (women)

== Largest Dutch football stadiums ==
#	Stadium	Capacity	City	Province	Home team	Opened	Notes
1	Johan Cruijff ArenA	55,600	Amsterdam	North Holland	Ajax	1996	UEFA Category 4 stadium
2	De Kuip	51,117	Rotterdam	South Holland	Feyenoord	1936	UEFA Category 4 stadium
3	Philips Stadion	35,000	Eindhoven	North Brabant	PSV	1916	UEFA Category 4 stadium
4	De Grolsch Veste	30,205	Enschede	Overijssel	FC Twente	1998	

== See also ==
- Football in Amsterdam
- Royal Dutch Football Association
- Netherlands at the FIFA World Cup
- Netherlands at the UEFA European Championship
- Netherlands national football team
- Netherlands women's national football team
- Eredivisie
- KNVB Cup
- Women's football in the Netherlands
- BeNe League, the top women's league in both Belgium and the Netherlands
- List of football stadiums in the Netherlands

== Attendances ==
The average attendance per top-flight football league season and the club with the highest average attendance:

Season	League average	Best club	Best club average
2024–25	20,037	AFC Ajax	54,263
2023–24	18,397	AFC Ajax	53,744
2022–23	18,394	AFC Ajax	53,582
2021–22	—	—	—
2020–21	—	—	—
2019–20	18,229	AFC Ajax	53,342
2018–19	17,998	AFC Ajax	52,987
2017–18	19,082	AFC Ajax	50,956
2016–17	19,086	AFC Ajax	49,620
2015–16	19,387	AFC Ajax	49,206
2014–15	18,770	AFC Ajax	50,058
2013–14	19,504	AFC Ajax	50,907
2012–13	19,619	AFC Ajax	50,490
2011–12	19,466	AFC Ajax	50,147
2010–11	19,296	AFC Ajax	47,316
2009–10	19,608	AFC Ajax	48,734
2008–09	19,789	AFC Ajax	49,014
2007–08	18,732	AFC Ajax	49,125
2006–07	18,078	AFC Ajax	48,610
2005–06	16,805	AFC Ajax	47,281
2004–05	16,238	AFC Ajax	48,571
2003–04	15,985	AFC Ajax	49,006
2002–03	16,255	AFC Ajax	47,148
2001–02	15,529	Feyenoord	39,903
2000–01	15,407	Feyenoord	37,609
1999–2000	13,977	AFC Ajax	39,980
1998–99	13,613	AFC Ajax	42,567
1997–98	12,770	AFC Ajax	47,315
1996–97	12,101	AFC Ajax	45,141
1995–96	10,298	Feyenoord	26,639
1994–95	10,277	Feyenoord	28,249
1993–94	10,011	PSV	25,759
1992–93	8,564	PSV	25,306
1991–92	7,977	PSV	24,015
1990–91	8,774	PSV	24,853
1989–90	8,027	PSV	24,344
1988–89	7,088	PSV	24,474
1987–88	6,718	PSV	21,453
1986–87	7,107	PSV	19,618
1985–86	7,111	PSV	18,376
1984–85	7,460	Feyenoord	17,139
1983–84	8,369	Feyenoord	25,696
1982–83	9,681	Feyenoord	23,155
1981–82	8,886	AFC Ajax	21,535
1980–81	8,924	Feyenoord	21,725
1979–80	9,876	Feyenoord	26,394
1978–79	9,848	Feyenoord	26,952
1977–78	9,806	PSV	22,824
1976–77	10,766	Feyenoord	24,991
1975–76	10,784	Feyenoord	29,683
1974–75	11,576	Feyenoord	37,185
1973–74	11,832	Feyenoord	35,569
1972–73	11,170	Feyenoord	34,118
1971–72	12,691	Feyenoord	44,412
1970–71	13,699	Feyenoord	47,824
1969–70	12,804	Feyenoord	42,853
1968–69	13,628	Feyenoord	47,647
1967–68	13,993	Feyenoord	48,088
1966–67	11,947	Feyenoord	33,500
1965–66	13,661	Feyenoord	39,400
1964–65	14,510	Feyenoord	46,833
1963–64	13,977	Feyenoord	35,600
1962–63	13,163	Feyenoord	37,733
1961–62	12,117	Feyenoord	41,882
1960–61	12,410	Feyenoord	40,912
1959–60	14,341	Feyenoord	40,176
1958–59	13,914	Feyenoord	38,753
1957–58	14,254	Feyenoord	39,765
1956–57	13,394	Feyenoord	42,559
1955–56	9,261	Feyenoord	35,235
1954–55	6,114	Feyenoord	16,231
1953–54	5,632	Feyenoord	12,362
