= Tweede Klasse (women) =

Dutch women's soccer league

The Tweede Klasse is a women's soccer league in the Netherlands. Teams in this league promote to the Eerste Klasse and relegate to Derde Klasse.

The league is organized in a Saturday and a Sunday division. Each of these are further divided into 4 groups, creating 8 sections.

== Sections ==
Saturday

- Group A: West 1
- Group B: West 2
- Group C: East 1
- Group D: East 2

Sunday

- Group E: West
- Group F: South 1
- Group G: South 2
- Group H: South 1
