= Zesde Klasse =

Football league in the Netherlands

- Organising bodies: KNVB
- Country: Netherlands
- Confederation: UEFA
- Divisions: West 1 Zesde Klasse A Zesde Klasse B South 2 Zesde Klasse A Zesde Klasse B Zesde Klasse C Zesde Klasse D
- Level on pyramid: 6
- Promotion to: Vijfde Klasse
- Relegation to: Zevende Klasse

The Zesde Klasse (English: Sixth Class) was formerly the tenth and lowest tier of football in the Netherlands for most of the districts and the eighth tier of Dutch amateur football. The league was divided into 6 divisions, 4 played on Saturday and 2 on Sunday. The leagues were abolished after the 2014–15 season. All teams were promoted to higher divisions based on geography.

The divisions consisted of 11, 12, 13 or 14 teams. The champions were promoted to the Vijfde Klasse. Each season was divided into a number of periods (Dutch: periodes). The winner of these periods qualified for promotion playoffs, provided they finish in the top nine overall in the season. Because the Zesde Klasse was the lowest football tier, teams were not relegated. In the North district only relegation to the Zevende Klasse occurred.

== Last Zesde Klasse divisions ==
Existed until 2014–15 season

District	Saturday division	Sunday division
West I		Zesde Klasse A Zesde Klasse B
South II		Zesde Klasse A Zesde Klasse B Zesde Klasse C Zesde Klasse D
