= Vierde Klasse =

Ninth tier of football in the Netherlands

The Vierde Klasse (English: Fourth Class) is the ninth tier of football in the Netherlands and the seventh tier of Dutch amateur football. This is the lowest league in the South I region. The league is divided into 55 divisions, 29 played on Saturday and 26 on Sunday.

Each division consists of 12 to 14 teams. The champions are promoted to the Derde Klasse, the bottom two teams are relegated to the Vijfde Klasse (only in districts where a Vijfde Klasse exists). Each season is divided into a number of periods (Dutch: periodes). The winner of these periods qualify for promotion playoffs, provided they finish in the top nine overall in the season. The teams finishing third from bottom in the final rankings play relegation playoffs.

== Vierde Klasse divisions ==
District	Saturday division	Sunday division
West I	Vierde Klasse A Vierde Klasse B Vierde Klasse C Vierde Klasse D Vierde Klasse E	Vierde Klasse A Vierde Klasse B Vierde Klasse C
West II	Vierde Klasse A Vierde Klasse B Vierde Klasse C Vierde Klasse D Vierde Klasse E Vierde Klasse F	
South I	Vierde Klasse A Vierde Klasse B Vierde Klasse C Vierde Klasse D Vierde Klasse E Vierde Klasse F Vierde Klasse G Vierde Klasse H	Vierde Klasse A Vierde Klasse B Vierde Klasse C Vierde Klasse D Vierde Klasse E
South II		Vierde Klasse A Vierde Klasse B Vierde Klasse C Vierde Klasse D Vierde Klasse E Vierde Klasse F Vierde Klasse G Vierde Klasse H Vierde Klasse I
East	Vierde Klasse A Vierde Klasse B Vierde Klasse C Vierde Klasse D	Vierde Klasse A Vierde Klasse B Vierde Klasse C Vierde Klasse D Vierde Klasse E
North	Vierde Klasse A Vierde Klasse B Vierde Klasse C Vierde Klasse D Vierde Klasse E Vierde Klasse F	Vierde Klasse A Vierde Klasse B Vierde Klasse C Vierde Klasse D
