= Topklasse (women) =

- Founded: 2011
- Country: Netherlands
- Confederation: UEFA
- Number of clubs: 12
- Level on pyramid: 3
- Promotion to: no promotion
- Relegation to: Hoofdklasse
- Domestic cup: KNVB Women's Cup

The Topklasse is a nationwide league of amateur women's football in the Netherlands. It is the highest amateur league, and the third tier in Dutch women's football in general.

== Format ==
The twelve teams play each other two times over the course of the season (a double round-robin system). The team finishing last gets relegated into the Hoofdklasse, while the second and third-last teams play a relegation play-off. There is no promotion as of now.

== History ==
The Topklasse was created in the 2011/12 season, above the then highest amateur level, the Hoofdklasse. The first title was won by RKTSV from Kerkrade. With three titles, SV Saestum is the Topklasse record champion.

== Champions ==
Year	Winner
2011/12	RKTSV
2012/13	Ter Leede
2013/14	SC Buitenveldert
2014/15	SV Saestum
2015/16	DTS Ede
2016/17	Ter Leede
2017/18	SV Saestum
2018/19	DTS Ede
2019/20	—
2020/21	—
2021/22	SV Saestum
2022/23	FC Eindhoven AV
2023/24	SV Saestum
2024/25	DTS Ede
