= Eerste Klasse (women) =

The Eerste Klasse is an association football league for women in the Netherlands. Clubs relegate to this league from the Hoofdklasse and promote to the Eerste Klasse from the Tweede Klasse.

The Eerste Klasse is divided into a Saturday and a Sunday competition:

Eerste Klasse Saturday

- Group A: 12 clubs
- Group B: 12 clubs

Eerste Klasse Sunday

- Group C: 12 clubs
- Group D: 12 clubs
