= Tweede Klasse =

Seventh tier of football in the Netherlands

- Founded: 1890; 1956 (Saturday clubs)
- Country: Netherlands
- Confederation: UEFA
- Number of clubs: 296 (20 Groups of 13/14)
- Level on pyramid: 7
- Promotion to: Eerste Klasse
- Relegation to: Derde Klasse
- Domestic cup: KNVB Cup
- Current: 2023-24 Tweede Klasse

The Tweede Klasse (English: Second Class) is the seventh tier of football in the Netherlands and the fifth tier of Dutch amateur football. Starting in the 2026–27 season, the Royal Dutch Football Association (KNVB) introduced new classifications mixing Saturday and Sunday teams in the same pools.

Each division consists of 14 teams. The champions are promoted to the Eerste Klasse (First Class), and the teams finishing 13th and 14th are relegated to the Derde Klasse (Third Class). Each season is divided into a number of periods (Dutch: periodes). The winners of these periods qualify for promotion playoffs, provided they finish in the top nine overall in the season. The teams finishing 12th in the final rankings play relegation playoffs.

== Divisions ==
Competition per district for the 2023/24 season
District	Saturday division	Sunday division
West I	Tweede Klasse A Tweede Klasse B	Tweede Klasse A Tweede Klasse B
West II	Tweede Klasse C Tweede Klasse D	
South I	Tweede Klasse E Tweede Klasse F Tweede Klasse G	Tweede Klasse C Tweede Klasse D
South II		Tweede Klasse E Tweede Klasse F
East	Tweede Klasse H Tweede Klasse I	Tweede Klasse G
North	Tweede Klasse J Tweede Klasse K	Tweede Klasse H Tweede Klasse I
Total	11	9
