= Royal Dutch Football Association =

Governing body of association football in the Netherlands

UEFA
- Founded: 8 December 1889; 136 years ago
- Headquarters: Zeist, Netherlands
- FIFA affiliation: 21 May 1904; 122 years ago
- UEFA affiliation: 15 June 1954; 72 years ago
- BeNe League affiliation: 5 May 2012 – 5 May 2015
- President: Frank Paauw
- Website: knvb.nl (in Dutch); knvb.com (in English); onsoranje.nl (in Dutch)

The Royal Dutch Football Association (Dutch: Koninklijke Nederlandse Voetbalbond, pronounced [ˌkoːnɪŋkləkə ˈneːdərlɑntsə ˈvudbɑlbɔnt]; KNVB [ˌkaːʔɛɱveːˈbeː]) is the governing body of football in the Netherlands. It organises the main Dutch football leagues (Eredivisie and Eerste Divisie), the amateur leagues, the KNVB Cup, and the Dutch men's and women's national teams.

For three seasons in the 2010s, the KNVB and its Belgian counterpart operated a joint top-level women's league, the BeNe League, until the two countries dissolved the league after the 2014–15 season and re-established their own top-level leagues. The KNVB is based in the central municipality of Zeist. With over 1.2 million members, the KNVB is the single largest sports association in the Netherlands.

== History ==
In 1889, the Nederlandse Voetbal en Athletiek Bond was founded. Due to certain disagreements, several football clubs ended their association with it and joined together to form Koninklijke Nederlandse Voetbalbond (KNVB) which was later renamed to its present name. It was one of the founding members of FIFA in 1904 and one of the first non-British football associations in Europe. The first Dutch football club was formed in 1879 in Haarlem. The Netherlands Football League Championship had already existed unofficially for a decade when the association was founded. The KNVB strongly disapproved of the professionalism of football in 1909. It said that "it will protest against it by all means necessary." In 2012, the KNVB launched an 11-point action plan, called 'Football for everyone' to promote gay football players in coming out. It released a 30-second video named 'Gay? It doesn't matter'; prepared by broadcaster BNN. The video was also broadcast during the Dutch national football teams World Cup qualifier match against Andorra held in October 2012.

During the 2014 FIFA World Cup, it collaborated with Royal Philips to open six football clinics across Brazil. Bert van Oostveen is the current Secretary-General of KNVB.

== Management ==
Senior management		Title/Managed Institution		Term of office
	Frank Paauw (born 1958)	President	National football team	Since; 27 May 2024
	Gijs de Jong (born 1972)	Secretary-General	National football team	Since; January 2018
	Nigel de Jong (born 1984)	Technical Director	Netherlands national football team · Netherlands women's national football team	Since; 4 June 2023
	Marianne Van Leeuwen (born 1961)	Director of professional football	Eredivisie · Eerste Divisie	Since; 1 September 2021
Board of directors – Professional Leagues		Title/Managed Institution		Term of office
	Jean-Paul Decossaux (born 1963)	Chief commercial officer	Eredivisie · Eerste Divisie	Since; 1 December 2009
	Ron Francis (born 1978)	Financial director	Eredivisie · Eerste Divisie	Since; 1 July 2010
	Mark Boetekees (born 1973)	Chief administrative officer	Eredivisie · Eerste Divisie	Since; 1 April 2010
Board of directors – Amateur Leagues		Title/Managed Institution		Term of office
	Jan Dirk van der Zee (born 1971)	Operations Director	Derde Divisie · Hoofdklasse · Eerste Klasse · Tweede Klasse; Derde Klasse · Vierde Klasse · Vijfde Klasse	Since; 1 April 2015
	Meta Römers (born 1970)	Administrative Director	Derde Divisie · Hoofdklasse · Eerste Klasse · Tweede Klasse; Derde Klasse · Vierde Klasse · Vijfde Klasse	Since; 1 January 2016
Supervisory board – Professional Leagues		Title/Managed Institution		Term of office
	Simon Kelder (born 1944)	Senior Member	Eredivisie · Eerste Divisie	Since; 4 June 2012
	Erik Mulder (born 1967)	Member	Eredivisie · Eerste Divisie	Since; 1 November 2016
Supervisory board – Amateur Leagues		Title/Managed Institution		Term of office
Pier Eringa	Pier Eringa (born 1961)	Chairman	Derde Divisie · Hoofdklasse · Eerste Klasse · Tweede Klasse; Derde Klasse · Vierde Klasse · Vijfde Klasse	Since; 1 December 2014
	Huub Wieleman (born 1955)	Member	Derde Divisie · Hoofdklasse · Eerste Klasse · Tweede Klasse; Derde Klasse · Vierde Klasse · Vijfde Klasse	Since; 1 December 2014
	Tjienta van Pelt (born 1970)	Member	Derde Divisie · Hoofdklasse · Eerste Klasse · Tweede Klasse; Derde Klasse · Vierde Klasse · Vijfde Klasse	Since; 1 June 2016
	Jos Vranken (born 1967)	Member	Derde Divisie · Hoofdklasse · Eerste Klasse · Tweede Klasse; Derde Klasse · Vierde Klasse · Vijfde Klasse	Since; 1 December 2014
	Albert van Wijk (born 1962)	Member	Derde Divisie · Hoofdklasse · Eerste Klasse · Tweede Klasse; Derde Klasse · Vierde Klasse · Vijfde Klasse	Since; 1 December 2014
Source: KNVB.nl (in Dutch)

== Presidents ==
President	Term
Pim Mulier	1889–1892
Pieter Droogleever Fortuyn	1892–1893
W. Prange	1893–1894
F. H. van Leeuwen	1894–1897
Pim Mulier	1897
Jasper Warner	1897–1919
Jan Willem Kips	1919–1930
Dirk van Prooije	1930–1942
Karel Lotsy	1942–1953
Hans Hopster	1953–1957
Toon Schröder	1957–1966
Wim Meuleman	1966–1980
Jo van Marle	1981–1993
Jeu Sprengers	1993–2008
Michael van Praag	2008–2019
Just Spee	2019–2023
Marianne van Leeuwen & Jan Dirk van der Zee (acting)	2023–2024
Frank Paauw	2024–present

== Current sponsorships ==
- Albert Heijn
- Bitvavo
- ING Group
- KPN
- Nike
- Staatsloterij

== Previous sponsorships ==
- Adecco
- Amstel
- Aquarius
- Coca-Cola
- Continental AG
- Heineken
- National-Nederlanden
- Nuon Energy
- Oad Reizen
- PricewaterhouseCoopers
- Super de Boer
- Tele2
- Unilever
- Unit4
- Volkswagen

== See also ==
- Netherlands men's national football team
- Netherlands women's national football team
