= Derde Klasse =

Dutch amateur football league

The Derde Klasse ('Third Class') is the eighth tier of football in the Netherlands and the sixth tier of Dutch amateur football. Starting in the 2026/27 season, the Royal Dutch Football Association (KNVB) is introducing mixed classifications for both the second and third classes of amateur football, putting Saturday and Sunday teams in the same pools.

Previously, the league was divided into 37 divisions, 20 played on Saturday and 17 on Sunday. Each division consists of 14 teams. The champions are promoted to the Tweede Klasse, the teams finishing 13th and 14th are relegated to the Vierde Klasse. Each season is divided into a number of periods (Dutch: periodes). The winner of these periods qualify for promotion playoffs, provided they finish in the top nine overall in the season. The teams finishing 12th in the final rankings play relegation playoffs.

== Derde Klasse divisions ==
District	Saturday division	Sunday division
West I	Derde Klasse A Derde Klasse B Derde Klasse C Derde Klasse D	Derde Klasse A Derde Klasse B Derde Klasse C
West II	Derde Klasse A Derde Klasse B Derde Klasse C Derde Klasse D	
South I	Derde Klasse A Derde Klasse B Derde Klasse C Derde Klasse D	Derde Klasse A Derde Klasse B Derde Klasse C Derde Klasse D
South II		Derde Klasse A Derde Klasse B Derde Klasse C Derde Klasse D
East	Derde Klasse A Derde Klasse B Derde Klasse C Derde Klasse D	Derde Klasse A Derde Klasse B Derde Klasse C
North	Derde Klasse A Derde Klasse B Derde Klasse C Derde Klasse D	Derde Klasse A Derde Klasse B Derde Klasse C
