= Vijfde Klasse =

Tenth and lowest tier of football in the Netherlands

The Vijfde Klasse (English: Fifth Class) is the tenth and lowest tier of football in the Netherlands and the eighth tier of Dutch amateur football. The league is divided into 41 divisions, 19 played on Saturday and 22 on Sunday.

Each division consists of 11 to 14 teams. The champions are promoted to the Vierde Klasse. Each season is divided into a number of periods (Dutch: periodes). The winner of these periods qualify for promotion playoffs, provided they finish in the top nine overall in the season. Because the Vijfde Klasse is the lowest football tier, no teams are relegated or play relegation playoffs.

== Vijfde Klasse divisions ==
District	Saturday division	Sunday division
West I	Vijfde Klasse A Vijfde Klasse B Vijfde Klasse C Vijfde Klasse D	Vijfde Klasse A Vijfde Klasse B
West II	Vijfde Klasse A Vijfde Klasse B Vijfde Klasse C Vijfde Klasse D	None
South I	None	Vijfde Klasse A Vijfde Klasse B Vijfde Klasse C Vijfde Klasse D Vijfde Klasse E
South II	None	Vijfde Klasse A Vijfde Klasse B Vijfde Klasse C Vijfde Klasse D Vijfde Klasse E
East	Vijfde Klasse A Vijfde Klasse B Vijfde Klasse C Vijfde Klasse D	Vijfde Klasse A Vijfde Klasse B Vijfde Klasse C Vijfde Klasse D Vijfde Klasse E Vijfde Klasse F
North	Vijfde Klasse A Vijfde Klasse B Vijfde Klasse C Vijfde Klasse D Vijfde Klasse E Vijfde Klasse F Vijfde Klasse G	Vijfde Klasse A Vijfde Klasse B Vijfde Klasse C Vijfde Klasse D
