= Football derbies in the Netherlands =

List of association football rivalries in the Netherlands

This is a list of the main association football rivalries in the Netherlands.

- The matches between the three largest club of the Netherlands are considered special rivalries, analogous to "eternal derbies" in other countries:
  - De Klassieker: Ajax vs. Feyenoord
  - De Topper: Ajax vs. PSV
  - PSV vs. Feyenoord
- Amsterdamse Derbies: Ajax (Southeast) vs. Amsterdamsche FC vs. FC Blauw-Wit (Southwest) vs. DWS (West) vs. De Volewijckers (North)
- Betuwse Derby: FC Lienden vs. SV TEC
- Brabantse Derbies:
  - Brabantse Derby: Willem II vs. NAC Breda
  - (Midden-)Brabantse Derby: Willem II vs. RKC Waalwijk
  - (Noordoost-)Brabantse Derby: TOP Oss vs. FC Den Bosch
  - (Zuidoost-) Brabantse Derby: FC Eindhoven vs. Helmond Sport
  - (Eindhoven) Lichtstad Derby: PSV Eindhoven vs. FC Eindhoven
- Rotterdamse Derbies: Feyenoord (South) vs. Sparta Rotterdam (North West) vs. Excelsior (North East) vs. Xerxes (North East)
- Alkmaar Derby: AZ Alkmaar vs. Alkmaarse Football Club '34
- Enschede Derby: CVV Sparta Enschede vs. FC Twente vs. VV Rigtersbleek
- Derby van het Noorden: FC Groningen vs. SC Heerenveen
- Derby van het Zuiden: MVV Maastricht vs. Fortuna Sittard
- Dorpsderby: IJsselmeervogels vs. SV Spakenburg
- Drents-Groningse Derby II– FC Groningen vs. FC Emmen
- Friese Derby: SC Heerenveen vs. SC Cambuur
- (Grote)Noord-Hollandse Derby: Ajax vs. AZ
- Rijnmondderby: FC Dordrecht vs. Feyenoord or Sparta Rotterdam or Excelsior
- (Kleine)Noord-Hollandse Derby: FC Volendam vs. Telstar vs. Ajax vs. AZ
- Vissersderby: FC Volendam vs. Telstar
- Hofstad vs. Hoofdstad: ADO Den Haag vs. Ajax
- IJsselderby: PEC Zwolle vs. Go Ahead Eagles
- Katwijk Derby: Quick Boys vs. VV Katwijk
- Overijsselse Derby: PEC Zwolle or Go Ahead Eagles vs. FC Twente or Heracles Almelo
- Derby van het Oosten: FC Twente vs. Go Ahead Eagles
- Twentse Derby: Heracles Almelo vs. FC Twente
- Zuid-Hollandse Derby: Feyenoord vs. ADO Den Haag vs. SVV vs. FC Dordrecht
- Gelderse Derbies:
  - (Grote)Gelderse Derby: Vitesse vs. N.E.C.
  - (Kleine)Gelderse Derby: De Graafschap vs. Vitesse or N.E.C.
- Graafschap - Eagles derby: De Graafschap vs Go Ahead Eagles
- Markermeer Derby:
  - Almere City FC vs. SC Telstar
  - Markermeerderby: Almere City FC vs. FC Volendam
- Limburgse Derby:
  - Roda JC vs. VVV-Venlo
  - Roda JC Kerkrade vs. MVV Maastricht
  - Derby tussen Noord- en Zuid-Limburg: VVV-Venlo vs. MVV Maastricht or Fortuna Sittard or Roda JC Kerkrade
  - Mijnstreekderby: Roda JC Kerkrade vs. Fortuna Sittard
