= Amsterdam derby =

Association Football derby in Amsterdam

Stadsderby
- Other names: Amsterdam derby
- Location: Amsterdam
- Teams: AFC; Ajax; Blauw-Wit; DWS; JOS Watergraafsmeer; Swift; De Volewijckers; VVA/Spartaan; Zeeburgia
- Latest meeting: 19 March 1978; Eredivisie; Ajax – FC Amsterdam (5–1); 25 October 2017; KNVB Cup; ASV De Dijk – Ajax (1–4)

Statistics
- Largest victory: 27 March 1960; Eredivisie; Ajax – Blauw-Wit (8–1); 24 September 2014; KNVB Cup; JOS Watergraafsmeer – Ajax (0-9)

The term Amsterdam derby (Dutch: Amsterdamse stadsderby) refers to matches played between professional and amateur football clubs of Amsterdam. Such clubs include AFC, Ajax, Blauw-Wit, DWS, JOS Watergraafsmeer, Swift, De Volewijckers, VVA and Zeeburgia. An Amsterdam Derby can be an individual match or an ongoing rivalry between clubs, players and fans.

A Stadsderby can involve any of the fifty-eight registered football clubs of Amsterdam. However, historically, the most significant are games which were played between AFC Ajax, AFC DWS, FC Blauw-Wit and AVV De Volewijckers, the four most successful of Amsterdam's football clubs. Variations have occurred, for example, after Blauw-Wit, DWS, and De Volewijckers merged to form FC Amsterdam in 1972 and FC Amsterdam dissolved in 1982. For over 30 years (1978–2012), Ajax was the only professional club in the city. The other clubs only met at the youth level. In the 2012–13 season, Amsterdamsche FC was promoted to the Topklasse

== Background ==
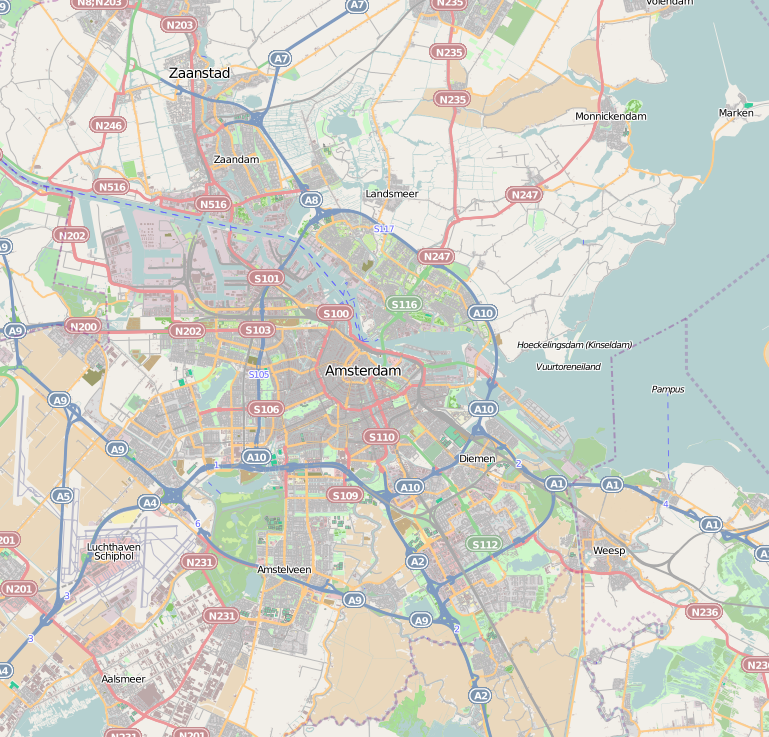
Current location of the clubs in Amsterdam, who have competed in the Netherlands Football League Championship and/or in the Eredivisie. (1898–present)

There are four main football clubs based in Amsterdam: Ajax, Blauw-Wit Amsterdam, DWS and De Volewijckers. Other teams, such as Amsterdamsche FC, JOS, Swift, VVA/Spartaan or Zeeburgia have also competed in the top league at times. Many of these clubs emerged from the Amsterdamsche Voetbal Bond (AVB), founded in 1894. Currently Ajax and Amsterdamsche FC are the only two professional football clubs in Amsterdam, with Ajax competing in the Eredivisie, and Amsterdamsche FC competing in the Tweede Divisie. Swift and Zeeburgia compete in the Eerste Klasse, JOS Watergraafsmeer and VVA/Spartaan play in the Derde Klasse, Blauw-Wit and DWS compete in the Vierde Klasse. De Volewijckers competed in the Vijfde Klasse until 2013, when the club merged with DWV to form DVC Buiksloot.

Ajax is the most renowned club of Amsterdam, and it is located in the Amsterdam-Zuidoost district of the city. RAP, another former club from the city, was the first professional club of Amsterdam, and the first official champion of the Netherlands (the unofficial first season was won by VV Concordia from Rotterdam). The club later withdrew its football department, however, focusing solely on cricket instead, making an early exit from football after having set an unrivaled precedent. FC Blauw-Wit Amsterdam originated in the Amsterdam-Zuid district of Amsterdam, and as the original tenants of the Old Stadion, they became the first official tenants of the Olympic Stadium. Currently, Blauw-Wit plays in the Amsterdam Nieuw-West district at Sportpark Sloten. AFC DWS also shared the Olympic Stadium in the Amsterdam-Zuid district with Blauw-Wit. Ajax occasionally made use of the stadium for larger matches, which drew crowds exceeding capacity limits of the De Meer Stadion. AFC DWS eventually relocated to their current location at Spieringhorn in the Nieuw-West district, while De Volewijckers from the Amsterdam-Noord district situated on the other side of the IJ.

== Honours ==
In total, 41 national titles (35 Eredivisie titles) were won by clubs from Amsterdam. Ajax has won the most titles nationwide with 36 national titles (28 Eredivisie). RAP holds the second most championships in the city, having won 5 national titles prior to the introduction of the Eredivisie, including the first official national championship in the Netherlands. RAP, however, ceased to field a football team in 1914, focusing on other sports instead. AVV De Volewijckers won the national championship once, prior to the introduction of the Eredivisie, and AFC DWS won the Eredivisie title once, as well. Ajax competed in all 57 seasons of the Eredivisie, amassing the most points of any club.

National honours
Competition	Ajax	RAP	DWS	De Volewijckers
Eredivisie	36	5	1	1
KNVB Cup	19	1	0	0
Johan Cruijff Shield	8	–	–	–
Total	63	6	1	1

== Ajax vs Blauw-Wit derby ==
The rivalry between Ajax and FC Blauw-Wit, two of Amsterdam's most successful clubs from the prime of Dutch football is the city's largest rivalry. The derby between both clubs is still seen as a match with a lot of tradition, but the rivalry is not as ferocious as it used to be. The rivalry between the two sides developed in the early years of organized football in the Netherlands, with both sides competing in the Eerste Klasse. Ajax competed in Het Houten Stadion from 1907 to 1934; FC Blauw-Wit occupied the Old Stadion from 1914 to 1928. FC Blauw-Wit was called the 'stadium club' and had some of the earliest core supporters in the Netherlands, painting their vehicles in the traditional blue and white zebra stripes and attending matches while chanting their songs. Their supporters were some of the first to engage in these practices. Eventually, FC Blauw-Wit would become the first tenants of the Olympic Stadium while Ajax relocated to the much smaller De Meer Stadion in 1934. Both teams shared the Olympic Stadium for home games from 1928 to 1972, with Ajax using the stadium for Continental fixtures in order to accommodate for much larger crowds. The first match to be played at the stadium was a Stadsderby between Ajax and Blauw-Wit (1–0) in 1928. In total, the two sides have competed in 52 matches in Cup and league play, not counting friendly encounters between the two sides. Ajax has won 23 matches and Blauw-Wit has won 16 of those meetings. The remaining 13 matches ended in a draw, and the goal differential between the two clubs is 83–66 in favor of Ajax. The first competition match between the two clubs was during the 1914–1915 season. The last competitive encounter between the sides was in the 1963–1964 season. Released in 1929 on His Master's Voice, the 7-inch single "De Voetbalmatch" by Dutch cabaret artist, Louis Davids, depicts this rivalry in the song.

Following FC Blauw-Wit's relegation from the top flight after the 1971–72 season, an Amsterdam derby between both clubs in the league is not possible. The last meeting between the two clubs was in July 2003, with Ajax winning the pre-season friendly match with a 0–11 score at Sportpark Sloten.

Ajax vs Blauw-Wit statistics
Competition	Ajax wins	Draws	Blauw-Wit wins	Total
Eredivisie	23	13	16	52
KNVB Cup	0	0	0	0
Total	23	13	16	52

== Blauw-Wit vs DWS derby ==
The FC Blauw-Wit vs Door Wilskracht Sterk derby involves two sides who shared the Olympic Stadium as a home venue from 1928 to 1972. Founded in 1907, AFC DWS emerged as a competitive club after a spell of dominance by De Volewijckers during the war. DWS went on to win the Eredivisie title once in 1964, a feat Blauw-Wit Amsterdam could not accomplish in their prime, although they did win the Eerste Klasse district West (on seven occasions) in the heyday of Dutch football. The first encounter between the two was in 1928, resulting in a 2–0 victory for FC Blauw-Wit. It wasn't until 1938, ten years later, that DWS achieved their first victory against Blauw-Wit, winning the match 0–2. By the mid-1950s, AFC DWS had taken over as Ajax's main city rivals. Originally from the working-class Spaarndammerbuurt district, AFC DWS (Door Wilskracht Sterk – Strong By Willpower) rose to dominance as the working class club, having produced an unprecedented rise in Dutch football. The team was promoted to the first division one season and won the competition a year later in 1964. Following the dissolution of FC Amsterdam, the two sides have seen the most regular season competition in recent years, competing in various league matches at the amateur level.

Blauw-Wit vs DWS statistics
Competition	Blauw-Wit wins	Draws	DWS wins	Total
Eredivisie	7	5	12	24
Eerste Klasse	2	4	2	8
KNVB Cup	0	0	0	0
Total	9	9	14	32

== Ajax vs DWS derby ==
Following an early dominance by RAP, Ajax, Blauw-Wit and De Volewijckers, AFC DWS emerged as a contender to take the city in the 50s and 60s, replacing Blauw-Wit as the main competitor to Ajax in the Capitol after a brief dominance by De Volewijckers during World War II. Winning the national title in 1964, the crosstown rivalry between Ajax and DWS would heat up to become the most intense rivalry in the city for two decades. While Ajax maintained their competitiveness with the two preceding clubs Blauw-Wit and De Volewijckers, it was DWS who would offer more competitive fixtures, building up to the late sixties and early seventies. At that time, Ajax took on Europe, dominating the continental competition and winning three consecutive European titles. In 1972, AFC DWS merged with Blauw-Wit and De Volewijckers to form FC Amsterdam, ending the contention between DWS and Ajax. The last Eredivisie match between the two sides occurred during the 1971–72 season, which ended in a 2–0 win for Ajax at De Meer Stadion.

Ajax vs DWS statistics
Competition	Ajax wins	Draws	DWS wins	Total
Eredivisie	13	6	4	23
KNVB Cup	3	0	0	3
Total	16	6	4	26

== Ajax vs Volewijckers derby ==
De Volewijckers rose to prominence during World War II, hailing from the other side of the IJ from Amsterdam-Noord. Ajax origins stem from the same part of town, before the club relocated to Het Houten Stadion in 1907. Ajax and De Volewijckers did not play many matches against each other, with the main contention stemming from the period during Nazi occupation. Under occupation, De Volewijckers secured a national title in 1944. De Volewijckers would later merge with Blauw-Wit and DWS to form FC Amsterdam, before that club folded in 1982.

Ajax vs Volewijckers statistics
Competition	Ajax wins	Draws	Volewijckers wins	Total
Eerste Klasse	1	0	1	2
KNVB Cup	3	1	0	4
Total	4	1	1	6

== Blauw-Wit vs Volewijckers derby ==
FC Blauw-Wit and De Volewijckers faced each other on four occasions professionally, with two away and two home matches each. Both clubs had one victory, while two matches ended in a draw. The two clubs would later merge to form FC Amsterdam.

Blauw-Wit vs Volewijckers statistics
Competition	Blauw-Wit wins	Draws	Volewijckers wins	Total
Eredivisie	1	2	1	4
Total	1	2	1	4

== DWS vs Volewijckers derby ==
While Blauw-Wit and Ajax would not pass unscathed, the DWS professional football record against De Volewijckers ended in one victory and one draw, remaining undefeated by De Volewijckers after competing in two matches professionally in total.

DWS vs Volewijckers statistics
Competition	DWS wins	Draws	Volewijckers wins	Total
Eredivisie	1	1	0	2
Total	1	1	0	2

== Ajax vs FC Amsterdam derby ==
Following the merger of AFC DWS and De Volewijckers, the club merged with FC Blauw-Wit to form FC Amsterdam in 1972. Ajax would go on to compete in 12 matches professionally against FC Amsterdam within a decade, winning a total of 10 matches and losing a total of two before the club folded in 1982. The capital city would not see another Stadsderby at the professional level after the final match between Ajax and FC Amsterdam that ended in a 5–1 Ajax victory. The preceding clubs of Blauw-Wit, DWS and De Volewijckers would resume their previous functions competing at amateur levels.

Ajax vs FC Amsterdam statistics
Competition	Ajax wins	Draws	FC Amsterdam wins	Total
Eredivisie	10	0	2	12
Total	10	0	2	12

== Records and statistics ==
=== Amsterdam clubs in the Dutch League system (2014–2015) ===
Current position of Amsterdam clubs in the Dutch league system as of the 2014–15 season.

Tier	League	Team(s)
1	Eredivisie	AFC Ajax
2	Eerste Divisie	Jong Ajax
3	Topklasse	AFC, Ajax Zaterdag
4	Hoofdklasse	ASV De Dijk, FC Chabab, Swift
5	Eerste Klasse	JOS Watergraafsmeer, AVV Zeeburgia, WV-HEDW, AGB
6	Tweede Klasse	DCG, De Beursbengels, SDZ, SV De Meteoor, DVC Buiksloot, DVVA
7	Derde Klasse	HBOK, FC Amsterdam, FC Blauw-Wit, SC Buitenveldert, SV De Meer, SV Kadoelen, OSV, Real Sranang, ZSGOWMS
8	Vierde Klasse	FC Ankaraspor, DWS, SC De Eland, ASV Arsenal, Fortius, SV Geinburgia, De Germaan, GeuzenMiddenmeer, SV Nieuw Sloten, SV Nieuw West, OSC Amsterdam, SC Overamstel, SDW, AVV Sloterdijk, TOB, TOS-Actief, TOG, Vlug & Vaarding, SC Voorland, ASV Wartburgia, ZRC Herenmarkt, Zuidoost United
9	Vijfde Klasse	DRC, FIT, P en T
9	Zesde Klasse	DEVO '58, SV Parkstad
10	Zevende Klasse	-

== See also ==
- De Klassieker
- Rotterdam derby
- Twentse Derby
- List of association football rivalries
