= 2017–18 Eredivisie =

62nd season of the Eredivisie

Eredivisie
- Season: 2017–18
- Dates: 11 August 2017 – 6 May 2018
- Champions: PSV (24th title)
- Relegated: Twente; Sparta Rotterdam; Roda JC
- Champions League: PSV; Ajax
- Europa League: AZ; Feyenoord; Vitesse
- Matches: 306
- Goals: 960 (3.14 per match)
- Top goalscorer: Alireza Jahanbakhsh (21 goals)
- Biggest home win: Vitesse 7–0 Sparta (14 April 2018)
- Biggest away win: NAC 0–8 Ajax (18 November 2017)
- Highest scoring: Utrecht 1–7 PSV (24 September 2017); NAC 0–8 Ajax (18 November 2017)
- Longest winning run: 10 matches PSV
- Longest unbeaten run: 14 matches Ajax
- Longest winless run: 15 matches Twente
- Longest losing run: 8 matches Sparta
- Highest attendance: 53,320; Ajax 2–0 Feyenoord (21 January 2018)
- Lowest attendance: 3,704; Excelsior 0–2 VVV Venlo (30 September 2017)
- Total attendance: 5,818,306
- Average attendance: 19,014

The 2017–18 Eredivisie was the 62nd season of the Eredivisie since its establishment in 1955. The season began on 11 August 2017 and concluded on 6 May 2018; the Europa League and relegation play-offs took place later that month. Feyenoord were the defending champions from the previous season. On 15 April 2018, PSV became champions for the 24th time after defeating their closest rival Ajax 3–0 at the Philips Stadion.

== Teams ==
A total of 18 teams took part in the league: The best fifteen teams from the 2016–17 season, two promotion/relegation playoff winners (Roda JC and NAC Breda) and the 2016–17 Eerste Divisie champions (VVV-Venlo).

Locations of the 2017–18 Eredivisie teams
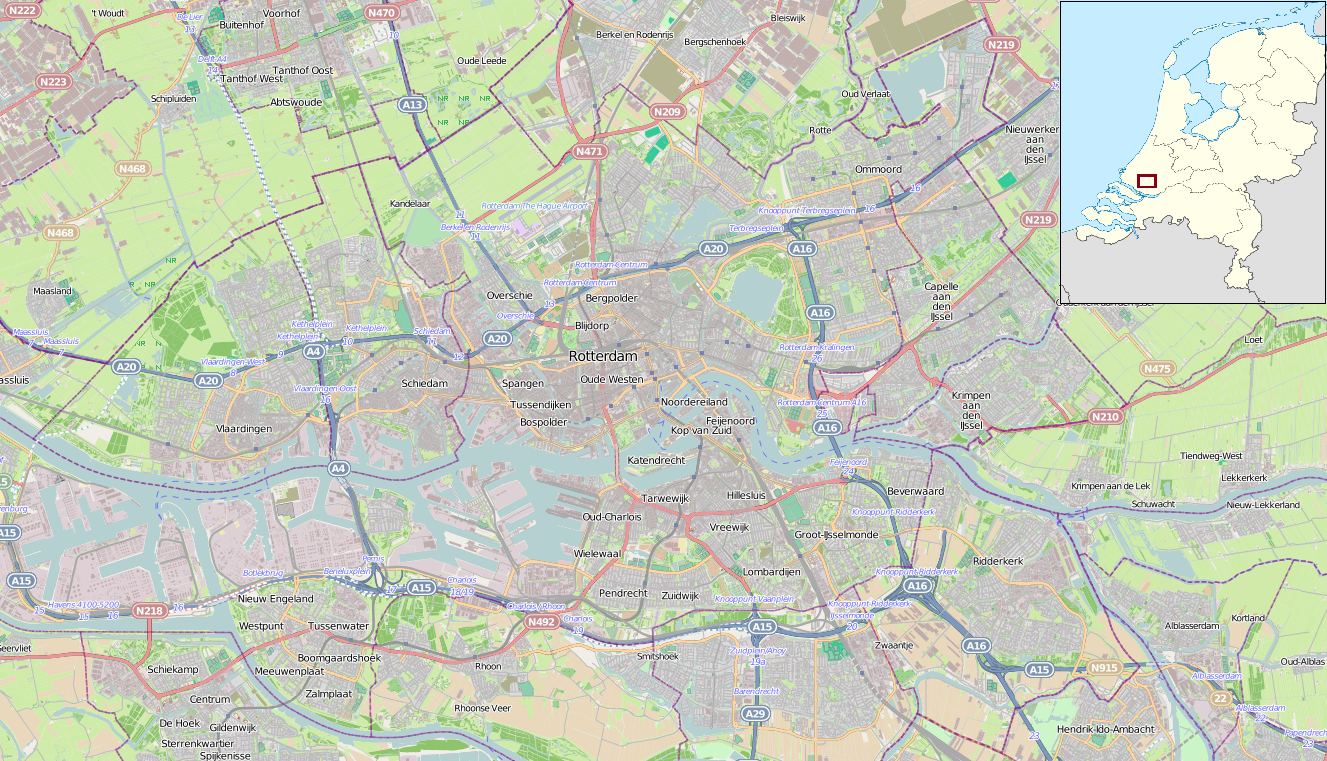
Rotterdam Eredivisie football clubs

=== Stadiums and locations ===
Club	Location	Venue	Capacity
ADO Den Haag	The Hague	Cars Jeans Stadion	15,000
Ajax	Amsterdam	Johan Cruyff Arena	54,033
AZ	Alkmaar	AFAS Stadion	17,023
Excelsior	Rotterdam	Van Donge & De Roo Stadion	4,500
Feyenoord	Rotterdam	De Kuip	51,177
Groningen	Groningen	Noordlease Stadion	22,550
Heerenveen	Heerenveen	Abe Lenstra Stadion	26,100
Heracles Almelo	Almelo	Polman Stadion	12,080
NAC Breda	Breda	Rat Verlegh Stadion	19,000
PEC Zwolle	Zwolle	MAC³PARK Stadion	12,500
PSV	Eindhoven	Philips Stadion	36,500
Roda JC	Kerkrade	Parkstad Limburg Stadion	19,979
Sparta Rotterdam	Rotterdam	Sparta Stadion Het Kasteel	11,026
Twente	Enschede	De Grolsch Veste	30,205
Utrecht	Utrecht	Stadion Galgenwaard	23,750
Vitesse	Arnhem	GelreDome	25,500
VVV-Venlo	Venlo	Seacon Stadion – De Koel	8,000
Willem II	Tilburg	Koning Willem II Stadion	14,500

=== Personnel and kits ===
Note: Flags indicate national team as has been defined under FIFA eligibility rules. Players and managers may hold more than one non-FIFA nationality.

Team	Manager	Captain	Kit manufacturer	Shirt sponsor
ADO Den Haag	(Netherlands) Alfons Groenendijk	(Netherlands) Aaron Meijers	Erreà	Basic-Fit Fitness
Ajax	(Netherlands) Erik ten Hag	(Netherlands) Joël Veltman	Adidas	Ziggo
AZ	(Netherlands) John van den Brom	(Netherlands) Ron Vlaar	Under Armour	AFAS Software
Excelsior	(Netherlands) Mitchell van der Gaag	(Netherlands) Ryan Koolwijk	Quick	DSW Zorgverzekeraar
Feyenoord	(Netherlands) Giovanni van Bronckhorst	(Morocco) Karim El Ahmadi	Adidas	Qurrent
Groningen	(Netherlands) Ernest Faber	(Netherlands) Sergio Padt	Puma	Essent
Heerenveen	(Netherlands) Jurgen Streppel	(Netherlands) Stijn Schaars	Jako	GroenLeven
Heracles	(Netherlands) John Stegeman	(Netherlands) Joey Pelupessy	Acerbis	Asito
NAC Breda	(Belgium) Stijn Vreven	(Spain) Pablo Marí	Legea	CM Payments
PEC Zwolle	(Netherlands) John van 't Schip	(Netherlands) Bram van Polen	Craft	Molecaten
PSV	(Netherlands) Phillip Cocu	(Netherlands) Marco van Ginkel	Umbro	Energiedirect.nl
Roda JC	(Netherlands) Robert Molenaar	(Netherlands) Ard van Peppen	Masita	MASCOT Workwear
Sparta Rotterdam	(Netherlands) Dick Advocaat	(Netherlands) Michel Breuer	Robey	Axidus
Twente	(Netherlands) (Bosnia and Herzegovina) Marino Pusic	(Germany) Stefan Thesker	Sondico	Pure Energie
Utrecht	(Netherlands) Jean-Paul de Jong	(Netherlands) Willem Janssen	Hummel	Zorg van de zaak
Vitesse	(Netherlands) Edward Sturing	(Georgia (country)) Guram Kashia	Macron	Truphone
VVV-Venlo	(Netherlands) Maurice Steijn	(Netherlands) Danny Post	Masita	Seacon Logistics
Willem II	(Netherlands) Reinier Robbemond	(Netherlands) Jordens Peters	Robey	Tricorp

=== Managerial changes ===
Team	Outgoing manager	Manner of departure	Date of vacancy	Position in table	Replaced by	Date of appointment
PEC Zwolle	(Netherlands) Ron Jans	End of contract	1 July 2017	Pre-season	(Netherlands) John van 't Schip	1 July 2017
Roda JC Kerkrade	(Netherlands) Rick Plum	End of interim spell	1 July 2017	Pre-season	(Netherlands) Robert Molenaar	1 July 2017
Ajax	(Netherlands) Peter Bosz	Signed by Borussia Dortmund	1 July 2017	Pre-season	(Netherlands) Marcel Keizer	1 July 2017
Twente	(Netherlands) René Hake	Sacked	18 October 2017	15th	(Netherlands) Gertjan Verbeek	30 October 2017
Sparta Rotterdam	(Netherlands) Alex Pastoor	Sacked	17 December 2017	17th	(Netherlands) Dick Advocaat	25 December 2017
Ajax	(Netherlands) Marcel Keizer	Sacked	21 December 2017	2nd	(Netherlands) Erik ten Hag	1 January 2018
FC Utrecht	(Netherlands) Erik ten Hag	Signed by Ajax	1 January 2018	6th	(Netherlands) Jean-Paul de Jong	4 January 2018
Willem II	(Netherlands) Erwin van de Looi	Resigned	8 March 2018	15th	(Netherlands) Reinier Robbemond (caretaker)	8 March 2018
FC Twente	(Netherlands) Gertjan Verbeek	Sacked	26 March 2018	18th	(Netherlands) (Bosnia and Herzegovina) Marino Pusic	26 March 2018
Vitesse	(Netherlands) Henk Fraser	Sacked	11 April 2018	7th	(Netherlands) Edward Sturing	11 April 2018

== Standings ==
Pos	Team	Pld	W	D	L	GF	GA	GD	Pts	Qualification or relegation
1	PSV Eindhoven (C)	34	26	5	3	87	39	+48	83	Qualification to Champions League play-off round
2	Ajax	34	25	4	5	89	33	+56	79	Qualification to Champions League second qualifying round
3	AZ	34	22	5	7	72	38	+34	71	Qualification to Europa League second qualifying round
4	Feyenoord	34	20	6	8	76	39	+37	66	Qualification to Europa League third qualifying round (Note: Feyenoord qualified for the Europa League third qualifying round by winning the 2017–18 KNVB Cup.)
5	Utrecht	34	14	12	8	58	53	+5	54	Qualification to European competition play-offs (Note: Four teams play for a spot in the 2018–19 UEFA Europa League second qualifying round.)
6	Vitesse (O)	34	13	10	11	63	47	+16	49	Qualification to European competition play-offs
7	ADO Den Haag	34	13	8	13	45	53	−8	47	Qualification to European competition play-offs
8	Heerenveen	34	12	10	12	48	53	−5	46	Qualification to European competition play-offs
9	PEC Zwolle	34	12	8	14	42	54	−12	44	
10	Heracles Almelo	34	11	9	14	50	64	−14	42	
11	Excelsior	34	11	7	16	41	56	−15	40	
12	Groningen	34	8	14	12	50	50	0	38	
13	Willem II	34	10	7	17	50	63	−13	37	
14	NAC Breda	34	9	7	18	41	57	−16	34	
15	VVV-Venlo	34	7	13	14	35	54	−19	34	
16	Roda JC Kerkrade (R)	34	8	6	20	42	69	−27	30	Qualification for the Relegation play-offs (Note: Ten teams, two from the Eredivisie and eight from the Eerste Divisie, play for two spots in the 2018–19 Eredivisie. The remaining eight teams play in the 2018–19 Eerste Divisie.)
17	Sparta Rotterdam (R)	34	7	6	21	34	75	−41	27	Qualification for the Relegation play-offs
18	Twente (Note: Twente were excluded from European football for 3 years on 15 December 2015.) (R)	34	5	9	20	37	63	−26	24	Relegation to Eerste Divisie

Source: eredivisie.nl
Rules for classification: 1) Points; 2) Goal difference; 3) Goals scored; 4) Head-to-head points; 5) Head-to-head goal difference; 6) Head-to-head away goals scored; 7) Play-off if relevant for deciding champion, relegation or participating in a European league, otherwise by draw. 8) Penalty shoot-out (only after a play-off)
(C) Champions; (O) Play-off winners; (R) Relegated

== Results ==
Home \ Away	ADO	AJA	AZ	EXC	FEY	GRO	HEE	HER	NAC	PEC	PSV	RJC	SPA	TWE	UTR	VIT	VVV	WIL
ADO Den Haag		1–1	0–3	1–2	2–2	0–3	1–2	4–1	0–2	4–0	3–3	3–2	1–0	2–1	0–3	1–0	1–1	2–1
Ajax	0–0		3–0	3–1	2–0	3–1	4–1	1–0	3–1	3–0	3–0	5–1	4–0	2–1	1–2	1–2	4–1	3–1
AZ	2–0	1–2		0–2	0–4	3–2	3–1	5–0	2–1	6–0	2–3	2–2	2–1	2–0	3–0	4–3	0–0	3–2
Excelsior	1–2	1–2	1–2		0–1	2–0	1–2	2–2	0–0	1–2	1–2	1–0	1–1	0–0	2–2	0–3	0–2	2–1
Feyenoord	3–1	1–4	2–1	5–0		3–0	1–1	1–0	0–2	0–0	1–3	5–1	3–1	2–1	3–1	1–0	1–1	5–0
Groningen	0–0	1–2	1–1	4–0	0–2		3–3	3–3	1–1	2–0	3–3	2–1	4–0	1–0	2–1	4–2	1–1	0–1
Heerenveen	2–0	0–4	1–2	0–1	2–3	1–1		1–1	1–0	1–2	2–0	1–1	2–1	1–0	2–2	0–4	2–2	2–0
Heracles Almelo	1–1	2–1	0–3	2–2	2–4	2–1	1–2		2–1	2–1	1–2	2–1	3–2	2–1	2–2	1–1	3–0	1–0
NAC Breda	0–1	0–8	1–3	3–1	2–1	2–1	3–0	6–1		0–2	1–4	0–1	2–2	1–2	3–1	1–0	0–1	1–2
PEC Zwolle	2–0	0–1	1–1	1–1	3–4	3–2	3–2	2–1	1–0		0–1	4–2	2–0	2–0	1–1	1–2	1–1	0–1
PSV Eindhoven	3–0	3–0	3–2	1–0	1–0	0–0	2–2	3–0	5–1	4–0		2–0	1–0	4–3	3–0	2–1	3–0	4–0
Roda JC Kerkrade	2–3	2–4	0–1	2–1	1–1	2–2	2–1	0–3	1–0	3–2	2–2		0–2	1–1	1–4	1–3	0–1	1–3
Sparta Rotterdam	2–1	2–5	0–2	2–3	0–7	2–1	0–0	2–5	2–1	1–1	1–2	1–2		1–0	1–3	0–1	3–2	1–0
Twente	2–3	3–3	0–4	1–3	1–3	1–1	0–4	2–1	1–1	2–0	0–2	3–0	1–1		4–0	1–1	1–2	2–2
Utrecht	3–3	0–0	1–1	3–1	1–1	1–1	3–1	1–1	2–2	2–1	1–7	2–0	1–0	3–1		5–1	1–0	2–0
Vitesse	2–0	3–2	1–2	1–2	3–1	2–0	1–1	0–0	4–1	0–0	2–4	0–3	7–0	5–0	1–1		1–1	2–2
VVV-Venlo	0–2	0–2	0–2	2–3	1–0	1–1	0–2	3–1	0–0	1–1	2–5	1–4	3–0	0–0	0–1	2–2		3–3
Willem II	1–2	1–3	0–2	1–2	1–5	1–1	1–2	3–1	1–1	2–3	5–0	1–0	2–2	3–1	3–2	2–2	3–0	

Source: eredivisie.nl
Legend: Blue = home team win; Yellow = draw; Red = away team win.
For upcoming matches, an "a" indicates there is an article about the rivalry between the two participants.

== Season statistics ==
=== Top scorers ===
Rank	Player	Club	Games	Goals	Penalties	Average
1	(Iran) Alireza Jahanbakhsh	AZ	33	21	4	0.64
2	(Norway) Bjørn Maars Johnsen	ADO Den Haag	34	19	0	0.56
3	(Netherlands) Steven Berghuis	Feyenoord	31	18	0	0.58
3	(Netherlands) Wout Weghorst	AZ	31	18	2	0.58
5	(Mexico) Hirving Lozano	PSV Eindhoven	29	17	0	0.59
6	(Spain) Fran Sol	Willem II	32	16	2	0.5
7	(Netherlands) Bryan Linssen	Vitesse	33	15	0	0.45
8	(Netherlands) Marco van Ginkel	PSV Eindhoven	28	14	9	0.5
8	(Slovenia) Tim Matavž	Vitesse	30	14	2	0.47
8	(Brazil) David Neres	Ajax	32	14	0	0.44

Updated to match(es) played on 6 May 2018.
Source: nos.nl (reliable) (in Dutch), Soccerway (unreliable)

=== Hat-tricks ===
Round	Player	Club	Goals	Date	Home	Score	Away
6	(Netherlands) Jürgen Locadia	PSV Eindhoven	15', 49', 68', 85' (p)	24 September 2017	Utrecht	1–7	PSV Eindhoven
12	(Netherlands) Donny van de Beek	Ajax	18', 27', 75'	18 November 2017	NAC Breda	0–8	Ajax
13	(Nigeria) Bartholomew Ogbeche	Willem II	62', 74', 90+2'	25 November 2017	VVV-Venlo	3–3	Willem II
13	(Netherlands) Justin Kluivert	Ajax	45', 60', 85'	26 November 2017	Ajax	5–1	Roda JC Kerkrade
18	(Germany) Lennart Thy	VVV-Venlo	17', 54', 76'	24 December 2017	VVV-Venlo	3–1	Heracles Almelo
21	(Netherlands) Luuk de Jong	PSV Eindhoven	45+3', 65', 72'	3 February 2018	PSV Eindhoven	4–0	PEC Zwolle
27	(Spain) Fran Sol	Willem II	59', 70' (p), 90' (p)	10 March 2018	Willem II	5–0	PSV Eindhoven
32	(Iran) Alireza Jahanbakhsh	AZ	12', 45+2', 53'	18 April 2018	AZ	4–3	Vitesse
34	(Iran) Alireza Jahanbakhsh	AZ	13', 52', 88'	6 May 2018	AZ	6–0	PEC Zwolle

=== Assists ===
Rank	Player	Club	Games	Assists	Average
1	(Morocco) Hakim Ziyech	Ajax	34	15	0.44
2	(Curaçao) Brandley Kuwas	Heracles Almelo	30	13	0.43
3	(Netherlands) Steven Berghuis	Feyenoord	31	12	0.39
3	(Brazil) David Neres	Ajax	32	12	0.38
3	(Iran) Alireza Jahanbakhsh	AZ	33	12	0.36
6	(Netherlands) Abdenasser El Khayati	ADO Den Haag	32	11	0.34
7	(Netherlands) Jens Toornstra	Feyenoord	32	10	0.31
8	(Mexico) Hirving Lozano	PSV Eindhoven	29	9	0.31
9	(Morocco) Zakaria Labyad	Utrecht	29	8	0.28
9	(England) Mason Mount	Vitesse	29	8	0.28
9	(Netherlands) Steven Bergwijn	PSV Eindhoven	32	8	0.25

Updated to match(es) played on 6 May 2018.
Source: nos.nl (reliable) (in Dutch), Soccerway (unreliable)

=== Discipline ===
- Most yellow cards: 11
  - Thomas Lam (Twente)
- Most red cards: 2
  - Adil Auassar (Roda JC)
  - Wilfried Kanon (ADO Den Haag)
  - Hirving Lozano (PSV)

== Awards ==
=== Monthly awards ===
Month	Player of the Month		Talent of the Month		Reference
Month	Player	Club	Player	Club	Reference
August	(Mexico) Hirving Lozano	PSV	(Netherlands) Denzel Dumfries	Heerenveen	
September	(Netherlands) Steven Berghuis	Feyenoord	(Spain) Angeliño	NAC Breda	
October	(Uruguay) Gastón Pereiro	PSV	(Brazil) David Neres	Ajax	
November	(Morocco) Zakaria Labyad	Utrecht	(Netherlands) Donny van de Beek	Ajax	
December	(Netherlands) Steven Berghuis	Feyenoord	(Spain) Angeliño	NAC Breda	
January	(Norway) Jonas Svensson	AZ	(England) Mason Mount	Vitesse	
February	(Netherlands) Steven Bergwijn	PSV	(Spain) Angeliño	NAC Breda	
March	(Colombia) Santiago Arias	PSV	(Greece) Kostas Tsimikas	Willem II	
April	(Brazil) David Neres	Ajax	(Spain) Angeliño	NAC Breda	

==== Individual annual awards ====
Eredivisie Individual annual awards 2017–18
Award	Player	Nationality	Club
Eredivisie Player of the Year	Santiago Arias	(Colombia)	PSV
Eredivisie Talent of the Year	David Neres	(Brazil)	Ajax

Team of the Season
Goalkeeper	(Netherlands) Sergio Padt (Groningen)			
Defenders	(Netherlands) Matthijs de Ligt (Ajax)	(Germany) Daniel Schwaab (PSV)	(Colombia) Santiago Arias (PSV)	(Spain) Angeliño (NAC Breda)
Midfielders	(Denmark) Lasse Schöne (Ajax)	(Netherlands) Steven Berghuis (Feyenoord)	(England) Mason Mount (Vitesse)	(Morocco) Hakim Ziyech (Ajax)
Forwards	(Netherlands) Luuk de Jong (PSV)		(Mexico) Hirving Lozano (PSV)	

== Play-offs ==
=== European competition ===
Four teams will play for a spot in the 2018–19 UEFA Europa League second qualifying round.

Semi-finals
ADO Den Haag	2	1	3
Vitesse	5	2	7
Heerenveen	4	1	5
Utrecht (a)	3	2	5

Final
Vitesse	3	2	5
Utrecht	2	1	3

Key: * = Play-off winners, (a) = Wins because of away goals rule, (e) = Wins after extra time in second leg, (p) = Wins after penalty shoot-out.

=== Promotion/relegation play-offs ===
Ten teams, two from the Eredivisie and eight from the Eerste Divisie, will play for two spots in the 2018–19 Eredivisie, the remaining eight teams will play in the 2018–19 Eerste Divisie.

First round
FC Dordrecht (p)	1	4	5
Cambuur	4	1	5
MVV	1	2	3
Almere City	3	3	6

Second round
Emmen	4	1	5
NEC	0	4	4
FC Dordrecht	1	2	3
Sparta Rotterdam	2	2	4
Almere City	0	2	2
Roda JC	0	1	1
Telstar	3	2	5
De Graafschap	2	4	6

Third round
Emmen*	0	3	3
Sparta Rotterdam	0	1	1
Almere City	1	1	2
De Graafschap*	1	2	3

Key: * = Play-off winners, (a) = Wins because of away goals rule, (e) = Wins after extra time in second leg, (p) = Wins after penalty shoot-out.

== Attendances ==
No.	Club	Average	Change	Highest
1	AFC Ajax	50,956	2,7%	53,320
2	Feyenoord	45,588	-4,0%	47,500
3	PSV	33,289	-1,3%	35,000
4	FC Twente	25,059	-1,4%	29,300
5	sc Heerenveen	20,379	-8,1%	25,600
6	FC Utrecht	18,971	3,8%	22,111
7	FC Groningen	18,613	-4,8%	22,568
8	NAC Breda	18,404	38,6%	18,969
9	SBV Vitesse	16,099	2,5%	19,876
10	AZ	14,797	-0,4%	17,002
11	PEC Zwolle	13,049	1,0%	13,250
12	Roda JC	12,613	-9,0%	15,383
13	Willem II	12,421	0,0%	14,400
14	ADO Den Haag	11,537	1,7%	14,031
15	Heracles Almelo	10,580	-4,8%	12,080
16	Sparta Rotterdam	10,150	-1,1%	10,606
17	VVV-Venlo	6,805	32,1%	8,000
18	SBV Excelsior	4,160	2,2%	4,400
