= VVK Telstar =

Dutch women's soccer club, 2011–2017, 2022–2025

Coordinates: 52°27′18″N 4°38′6″E

Telstar Vrouwen
- Full name: Stichting Vrouwenvoetbal Kennemerland e.o. / Telstar Vrouwen
- Nickname: Witte Leeuwinnen (White Lionesess)
- Founded: 18 July 2011 (as SC Telstar VVNH)
- Dissolved: 3 September 2025
- Ground: BUKO Stadion, Velsen-Zuid
- Capacity: 5,200
- Managing director: Leon Annokkée
- Head coach: Ed Engelkes
- League: Eredivisie
- 2024–25: 11th
- Website: vrouwen.sctelstar.nl
Home colours	Away colours

Vrouwenvoetbal Kennemerland e.o. (VVK) or Telstar Vrouwen was a Dutch women's football club based in Velsen, North Holland that played in the Dutch top level Eredivisie. It was affiliated with men's team SC Telstar, sharing a logo and home stadium. The club transferred its license of the women's team to run by a new club, Hera United in Amsterdam, in September 2025.

The club was established in 2011. Its first season was its most successful, finishing third out of seven Eredivisie teams. Many of its initial players came from AZ Alkmaar, which had discontinued its women's team. The following three seasons, the club competed in the BeNe League before returning to the reformed Eredivisie. In the 2016–17 season, future Dutch national striker Katja Snoeijs led the league with 21 goals. After that season, the team relocated to Alkmaar and formed VV Alkmaar.

In January 2022, media outlets reported Telstar would rejoin the Eredivisie the following season. Following its return, the club finished second-to-last in each of its three seasons. Marelle Worm coached the team upon its return to the Eredivisie before being fired in February 2025. She was replaced by former Ajax and AZ coach Ed Engelkes.

After three seasons, the club transferred its team, license, and place in the Eredivise to Hera United. The upstart Hera and Telstar first announced a partnership in July 2024. This change required approval from the KNVB. In December 2024, the KNVB approved a rule change allowing a women's-only club to field a professional team, a necessary step for Hera to take over the club. In June 2025, the KNVB approved additional needed rule changes. The final approval came in September 2025. Telstar and Hera would jointly operate a youth program, Hera-Telstar Opleidingen. Hera leadership said they intended to host matches at the Olympic Stadium in Amsterdam, including a potential Amsterdam derby with AFC Ajax. In August 2025, the club announced it would play its home games at Sportpark Goed Genoeg in Amsterdam for the 2025–26 season.

== Results Eredivisie / BeNe League ==
3	9	5	6	5	5	10	11	11
12	13	14	15	16	17	23	24	25
Women's Eredivisie BeNe League

Season	League	Position	W – D – L = Pts	GF – GA	Top scorer	KNVB Cup
2011–12	Eredivisie	3 / 7	8 – 3 – 7 = 27	39 – 42	de Vos (16)	Quarterfinals
2012–13	BeNe League	9 / 16	16 – 4 – 8 = 52	71 – 29	de Vos (11)	Quarterfinals
2013–14	BeNe League	5 / 14	13 – 4 – 9 = 43	53 – 33	Koopmans (12)	Quarterfinals
2014–15	BeNe League	6 / 13	10 – 7 – 7 = 37	43 – 31	Koopmans (10)	Semifinals
2015–16	Eredivisie	5 / 7	6 – 2 – 16 = 20	33 – 79	Roof (8)	Round of 16
2016–17	Eredivisie	5 / 8	11 – 4 – 12 = 37	61 – 65	Snoeijs (21)	Quarterfinals
2022-23	Eredivisie	10 / 11	3 – 3 – 14 = 12	18 – 65	Hassani (5)	Round of 16
2023-24	Eredivisie	11 / 12	3 – 3 – 16 = 12	16 – 69	Gomez (4)	Round of 16
2024-25	Eredivisie	11 / 12	2 – 5 – 15 = 11	22 – 59	van Belen (6)	Round of 16

== Head coaches ==
- (Netherlands) Hans de Winter (2011–2012)
- (Netherlands) Toon Beijer (2012–2013)
- (Netherlands) Gideon Dijks (2013–2017)
- (Netherlands) Marelle Worm (2022–2025)
- (Netherlands) Ed Engelkes (2025)

== Final squad ==
As of 15 October 2024

Note: Flags indicate national team as defined under FIFA eligibility rules; some limited exceptions apply. Players may hold more than one non-FIFA nationality.

No.	Pos.	Nation	Player
1	GK	NED	Kelly Steen
2	DF	NED	Puck Donker
3	DF	NED	Felice Hermans
4	DF	JPN	Akari Takeshige
5	DF	NED	Nikki Ridder
6	DF	NED	Kim Remijnse
7	DF	ARU	Soraya Verhoeve
8	MF	NED	Isa Gomez
9	FW	NED	Jannette van Belen
10	MF	JPN	Chinatsu Kira
11	MF	MAR	Samya Hassani
12	DF	NED	Pauline van de Pol

No.	Pos.	Nation	Player
13	MF	USA	Sydney Blomquist
14	FW	NED	Isabelle Nottet
15	MF	NED	Esmee Daalman
16	GK	NED	Mei Wei Rispens
17	FW	NED	Mila Lagcher
18	DF	NED	Joy Vader
19	FW	NED	Lieke Vis
20	DF	NED	Tess Tiebie
21	FW	NED	Nicci Berrevoets
22	MF	NED	Yasmin Kleef
23	MF	NED	Anna van der Vlist
24	GK	NED	Floor Ursem

=== International players ===
(Netherlands) Dyanne Bito
(Netherlands) Loes Geurts
(Netherlands) Kim Dolstra
(Netherlands) Stefanie van der Gragt
(Morocco) Samya Hassani
(Netherlands) Claudia van den Heiligenberg
(Tunisia) Yesmin Khanchouch
(Japan) Chinatsu Kira
(Netherlands) Daphne Koster
(Netherlands) Desiree van Lunteren
(Guyana) Brittany Persaud
(Croatia) Kristina Šundov
(Israel) Mairav Shamir
(Netherlands) Katja Snoeijs
(Netherlands) Priscilla de Vos
(Croatia) Kelly Zeeman
