= Pascal Heije =

Dutch footballer (born 1979)

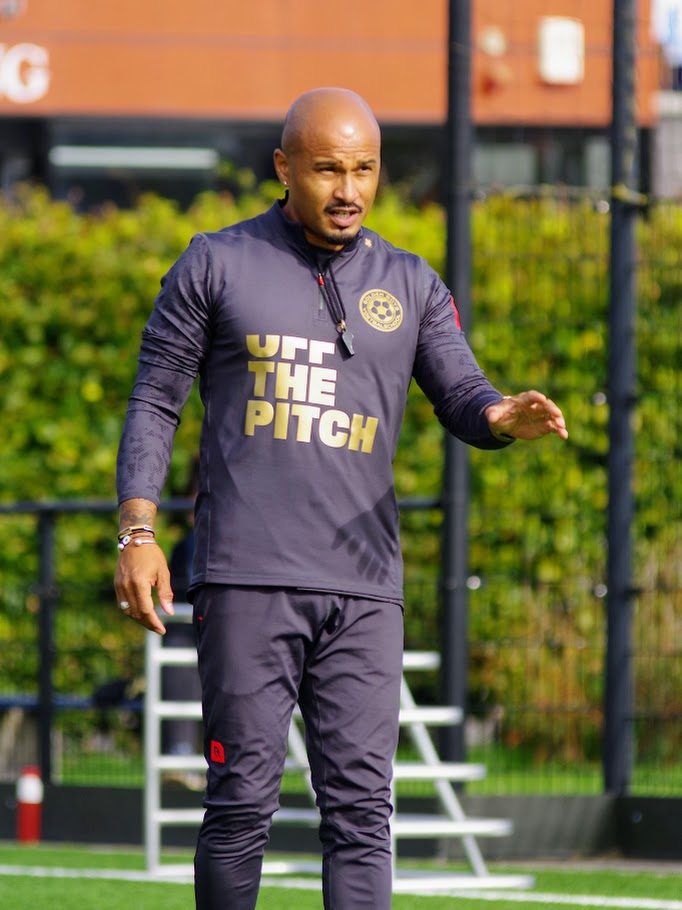

Personal information
- Full name: Pascal Bernardo Raul Heije
- Date of birth: 2 October 1979 (age 47)
- Place of birth: Amsterdam, Netherlands
- Height: 1.70 m (5 ft 7 in)
- Position: Midfielder

Youth career
- FC Weesp
- Ajax

Senior career*
Years	Team	Apps	(Gls)
1999–2003	Ajax	2	(0)
2000–2003	→ RBC (loan)	78	(0)
2003–2005	NEC	34	(0)
2006	Go Ahead Eagles	11	(0)
2007	Negeri Sembilan		
2008–2009	RBC	13	(0)
2009	APEP	4	(0)
2011–2012	Bali De Vata	18	(1)
2015–2016	Blauw-Wit Beursbengels		

International career
1995	Netherlands U16	3	(0)
1995–1996	Netherlands U17	4	(0)
1996–1997	Netherlands U18	7	(0)
1997–1998	Netherlands U19	6	(0)
1986–1989	Netherlands U21	1	(0)
- * Club domestic league appearances and goals as of September 30, 2009

Pascal Heije (born 2 October 1979) is a Dutch retired footballer who plays as a midfielder.

== Club career ==
Heije started his professional career at Ajax, who loaned him to RBC. He was without a club for half a year after a spell at NEC, but joined Go Ahead Eagles in January 2006. After another spell with RBC and a short stint in Cyprus, Heije tried his luck in Indonesia with Bali De Vata.

He announced his return to the pitch with Blauw-Wit Beursbengels in 2015.

== International career ==
Heije played 7 games for the Netherlands national under-18 football team and 6 for the U19s.

== Post-playing career ==
Heije has his own football school, Golden Boys. He was appointed head coach at De Volewijckers in December 2023. In summer 2024, Heije returned to childhood club FC Weesp to professionalize the academy.
