= Samya Hassani =

Moroccan footballer (born 2000)

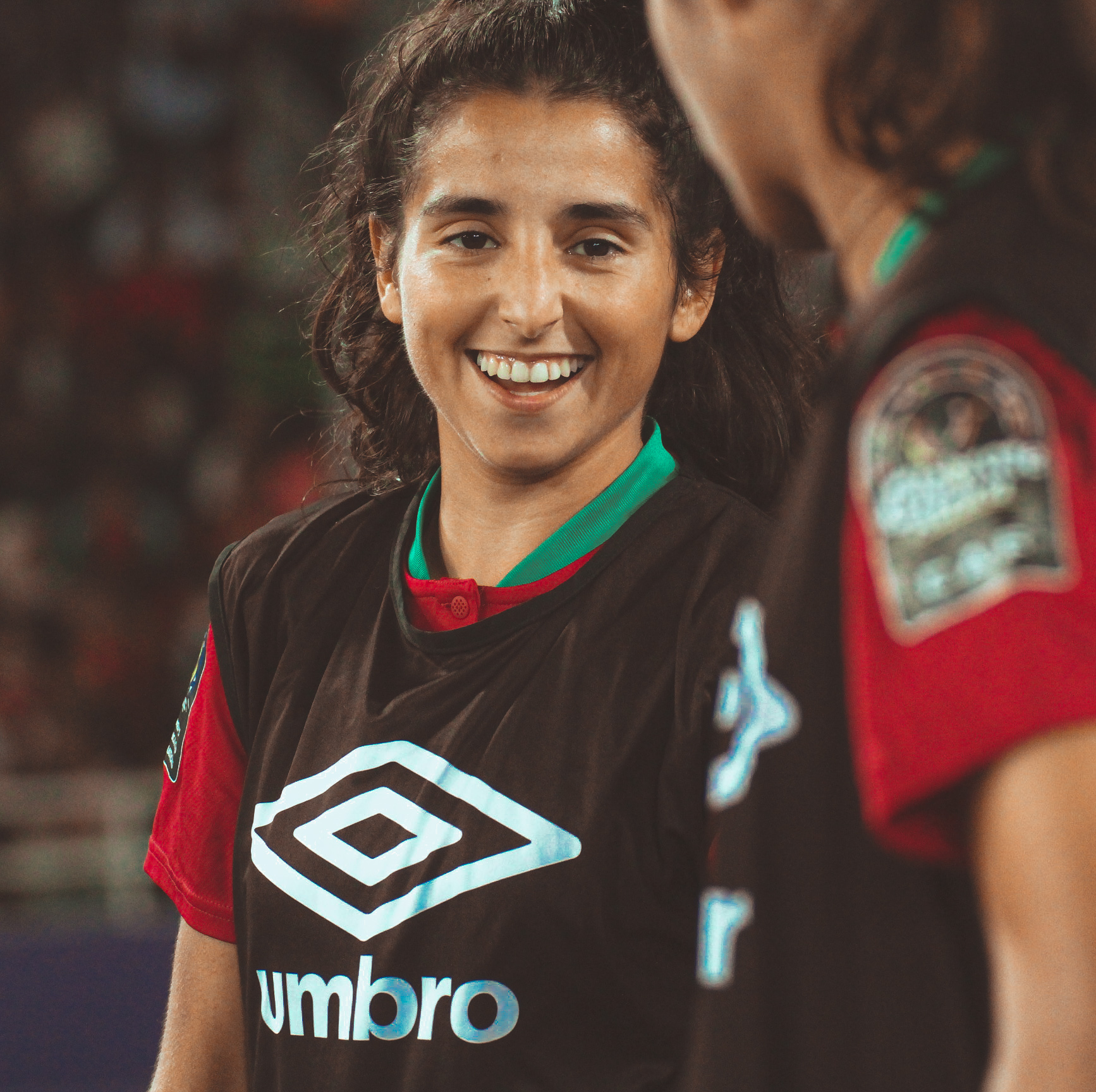
- Hassani with Morocco in 2022

Personal information
- Date of birth: 3 January 2000 (age 26)
- Place of birth: Amsterdam, Netherlands
- Height: 1.60 m (5 ft 3 in)
- Position: Forward

Team information
- Current team: SC Telstar
- Number: 11

Youth career
- 2016–2018: SDZ Amsterdam
- 2018–2019: Wartburgia
- 2019: VV Alkmaar

Senior career*
Years	Team	Apps	(Gls)
2019–2021	VV Alkmaar	13	(1)
2021–2022	Gent	9	(1)
2022–2024	SC Telstar	29	(6)
2024	Fenerbahçe	4	(0)
2024–	SC Telstar		

International career^{‡}
2020	Morocco U20		
2021–	Morocco		
Medal record
Representing Morocco
Women's Africa Cup of Nations
Second place	2022 Morocco
- * Club domestic league appearances and goals as of 10:05, 24 September 2024 ‡ National team caps and goals as of 23:50, 18 July 2022 (UTC).

Samya Hassani (Arabic: ساميا حسني, born 3 January 2000) is a Moroccan professional footballer who plays as a forward for Dutch Eredivisie club SC Telstar. Born in the Netherlands, she represents Morocco at international level.

== Club career ==
=== VV Alkmaar ===
Hassani debuted in the Eredivisie with VV Alkmaar on 25 August 2019 against AFC Ajax. Hassani scored her only goal for Alkmaar against Excelsior on 6 September 2019, scoring in the 85th minute.

=== Gent ===
Hassani signed with KAA Gent in the Belgian Women's Super League in July 2021. She scored her only goal in Belgium in a 9–0 home win over White Star Woluwe on 1 April 2022.

=== Telstar ===
After one year with Gent, Hassani returned to the Eredivisie to play for the revived Telstar team for the 2022–23 season. She debuted for the White Lionesses against ADO Den Haag on 18 September 2022. Hassani scored her first Telstar goal against Ajax on 25 October 2022, scoring in the 67th minute. She led Telstar with five goals in her first season with the club. Two of her goals were decisive, with a 94th-minute goal against Fortuna Sittard forcing a 2–2 draw and an 29th-minute goal putting Telstar on top of Excelsior, 2–1.

=== Fenerbahçe ===
Hassani transferred from Telstar to Fenerbahçe in February 2024 for an undisclosed transfer fee. She made her league debut on 9 March 2024 against Fatih Van S.K. She played in four matches for the Istanbul club.

=== Return to Telstar ===
Hassani returned to Telstar for the 2024–2025 season. She stated that she was disappointed with her playing time with Fenerbahçe and felt lonely in Turkey.

== International career ==
Hassani was scouted to the Morocco national team by a scout messaging her on Instagram.

Hassani made her senior debut for Morocco on 14 June 2021 in a 3–2 friendly home win over Mali. She scored her first goal for Morocco in a 2–0 against Senegal on 30 November 2021. She notched her first international brace in a win over Congo on 11 June 2022.

On 1 July 2022, Hassani was called up to the Morocco squad for 2022 Women's Africa Cup of Nations. Hassani was called up for the provisional Morocco squad for the 2023 FIFA Women's World Cup. However, she did not make the final team.

== International goals ==
No.	Date	Venue	Opponent	Score	Result	Competition
1.	30 November 2021	Prince Moulay Abdellah Stadium, Rabat, Morocco	Senegal	1–0	2–0	Friendly
2.	11 June 2022	Prince Moulay Abdellah Stadium, Rabat, Morocco	Congo	4–0	7–0	Friendly
3.	11 June 2022	Prince Moulay Abdellah Stadium, Rabat, Morocco	Congo	7–0	7–0	Friendly

== Personal life ==
Hassani began playing football competitively when she was 16.

Hassani won the Best Sportswoman of the Year award at the Diversity Sport Awards on 22 February 2024.

== See also ==
- List of Morocco women's international footballers
