= Jannette van Belen =

Dutch footballer

Personal information
- Date of birth: 29 May 1998 (age 28)
- Place of birth: Leiden, Netherlands
- Position: Forward

Team information
- Current team: SC Telstar VVNH
- Number: 7

Youth career
- Quick Boys

Senior career*
Years	Team	Apps	(Gls)
2014–2019	FC Rijnvogels		
2019–2022	ADO Den Haag	45	(8)
2023–	SC Telstar	20	(2)
- * Club domestic league appearances and goals as of 15:50, 30 June 2024 (UTC)

Jannette van Belen (born 29 May 1998) is a Dutch footballer who plays as a forward for SC Telstar in the Eredivisie.

== Career ==
=== ADO Den Haag ===
On 12 July 2019, van Belen was announced at ADO Den Haag. She made her league debut against Heerenveen on 1 November 2019. She scored her first league goal against Twente on 11 October 2020, scoring in the 90th+3rd minute. On 12 May 2021, van Belen signed a new contract. On 13 July 2022, she extended her contract. van Belen suffered a serious knee injury that kept her out for a year.

=== SC Telstar ===
Van Belen was announced at Telstar. She made her league debut against PSV on 9 September 2023. She scored her first league goal against AZ Alkmaar on 13 October 2023, scoring in the 64th minute.

== International career ==
van Belen also works in the Ministry of Defence, allowing her to play in the World Military Cup.
