= Kim Dolstra =

Dutch football defender

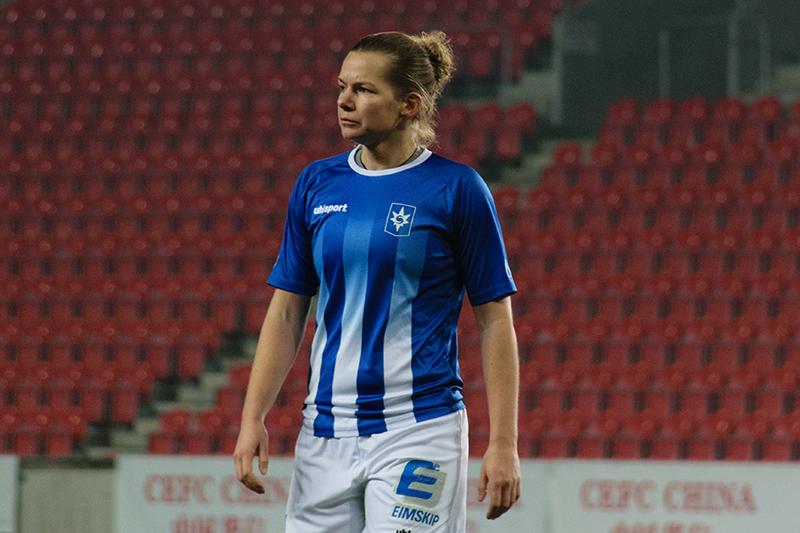

Personal information
- Full name: Kim Dolstra
- Date of birth: 4 November 1988 (age 38)
- Place of birth: Amsterdam, Netherlands
- Position: Defender

Team information
- Current team: Medkila

Senior career*
Years	Team	Apps	(Gls)
2005–2007	Fortuna Wormerveer		
2007–2011	AZ	59	(1)
2011–2013	Telstar	46	(4)
2013–2014	ADO Den Haag	17	(1)
2014–2015	ÍBV		
2015	ADO Den Haag	4	(0)
2016–2017	AGSM Verona	5	(0)
2017	Stjarnan	18	(0)
2018	Grand Bodo	17	(0)
2019–	Medkila		

International career
2003	Netherlands U15	1	(0)
2005	Netherlands U17	10	(0)
2005–2006	Netherlands U19	13	(1)
2013–2014	Netherlands	3	(0)
- * Club domestic league appearances and goals as of 18:51, 31 May 2024

Kim Dolstra (born 4 November 1988) is a Dutch football defender, currently playing for Medkila IL. She previously played in the Eredivisie for Fortuna Wormerveer, AZ, Telstar, ADO Den Haag and AGSM Verona in Italy's women's Serie A. She was awarded the 2010 championship's Golden Shoe after winning her third championship in a row with AZ.

== Career ==
=== AZ ===
Dolstra scored her first league goal against Heerenveen on 26 November 2009, scoring in the 47th minute.

=== Alkmaar ===
Dolstra made her league debut against ADO Den Haag on 9 September 2011. She scored her first league goal against PEC Zwolle on 13 April 2012, scoring a penalty in the 61st minute.

=== First spell at ADO Den Haag ===
Dolstra was announced at ADO Den Haag on 17 June 2013. She made her league debut against Anderlecht on 30 August 2013. She scored her first league goal against Standard Liège on 13 October 2013, scoring in the 44th minute.

=== ÍBV ===
Dolstra was announced at ÍBV.

=== Second spell at ADO Den Haag ===
During her second spell with the club, Dolstra made her league debut against Lierse on 17 April 2015.

=== Hellas Verona ===
Dolstra was announced at Verona. She made her league debut against Jesina on 1 October 2016.

=== Stjarnan ===
Dolstra made her league debut against Haukar on 27 April 2017.

=== Grand Bodo ===
Dolstra made her league debut against Rosenborg on 24 March 2018.

=== Medkila ===
Dolstra made an appearance in the Playoffs on 22 November 2020 against Kolbotn.

== International career ==
As an Under-19 international she played the 2006 U-19 European Championship.

On 6 March 2013, she made her debut for the Dutch national team, in the 2013 Cyprus Cup match against Finland.

In 2014, she was selected for the World Cup qualifiers in April 2014. However, it was announced she had torn a cruciate ligament during a match against Albania two weeks later.

== Honours ==
AZ

- Eredivisie (women) (3): 2007–08, 2008–09, 2009–10
- KNVB Women's Cup (2): 2006, 2011
