= Stijn Vreven =

Belgian football manager (born 1973)

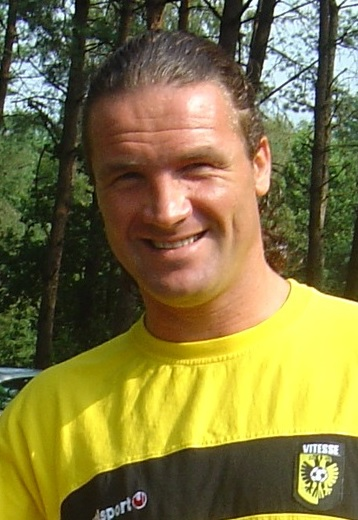
- Vreven with Vitesse

Personal information
- Date of birth: 18 July 1973 (age 53)
- Place of birth: Hasselt, Belgium
- Height: 1.81 m (5 ft 11 in)
- Position: Right-back

Team information
- Current team: Lokeren (head coach)

Youth career
- Diepenbeek
- Sint-Truiden

Senior career*
Years	Team	Apps	(Gls)
1993–1997	Mechelen	84	(3)
1997–1999	Gent	57	(0)
1999–2003	Utrecht	113	(3)
2003–2004	1. FC Kaiserslautern	8	(0)
2004–2005	Vitesse Arnhem	46	(0)
2006	Omonia	6	(0)
2006–2007	ADO Den Haag	20	(0)
2007–2008	Sint-Truiden	11	(0)
2008	→ Tongeren (loan)		
2008–2010	Leopoldsburg		
2010–2012	Esperanza Neerpelt		

International career
	Belgium U18	3	(0)
1994–1995	Belgium U21	13	(1)
2002	Belgium	2	(0)

Managerial career
- 2010–2012: KFC Esperanza Neerpelt
- 2012–2013: Dessel Sport
- 2013–2015: Lommel United
- 2015–2016: Waasland-Beveren
- 2017–2018: NAC Breda
- 2018–2019: Beerschot Wilrijk
- 2019–2020: Lokeren
- 2020–2021: AS Trenčín
- 2022–2023: Dessel Sport
- 2023: Oostende
- 2024: FK Panevėžys
- 2025–: Lokeren
- * Club domestic league appearances and goals

Stijn Vreven (born 18 July 1973) is a Belgian professional football manager and a former player who is the head coach of Challenger Pro League club Lokeren.

== Playing career ==
Vreven's career began when he signed a professional contract with Y.R. K.V. Mechelen, making his first first-team appearance in 1993, at the age of 20. After four seasons in Mechelen he moved to K.A.A. Gent where he developed into a better player for another two seasons. Then he made the step abroad to play for Dutch side FC Utrecht. In four seasons Vreven developed from an unknown player into a hero among the FC Utrecht supporters. He's known for his determination and aggressiveness, which gave him the status of a real killer on the pitch. After his period in Utrecht he moved to Germany to play for Bundesliga side 1. FC Kaiserslautern. He was not able to become a first team regular and returned to The Netherlands the year after where he played for Vitesse Arnhem. At Vitesse he showed that he still had the same determination and became a regular from the start. When criticising his own team mates in December 2005 manager Edward Sturing placed Vreven in Vitesse's second team. A few weeks later he left the team to sign a new contract at AC Omonia in Cyprus. After playing just six matches he returned to The Netherlands once again, where he joined ADO Den Haag.

In March 2007, Vreven was diagnosed with diabetes (type 1). This did not stop him, however, from continuing to play football. In August 2007, Vreven played for Sint-Truiden and joined in January 2008 K.S.K. Tongeren on loan. He returned in summer 2008 to K. Sint-Truidense V.V. and moved to K.E.S.K. Leopoldsburg. In November 2010 he left K.E.S.K. Leopoldsburg and signed a contract as player-coach by KFC Esperanza Neerpelt.

== Coaching career ==
From 2012 till June 2015 he was the coach of K.F.C. Dessel Sport. He was the coach of Waasland-Beveren from July 2015 to October 2016.

On 20 June 2023, Vreven was hired as manager of Oostende, recently relegated from the Belgian Pro League. Following a rough start to the season compounded by point deductions owing to missed repayment deadlines, Vreven was dismissed on 11 December 2023, with the club bottom of the Challenger Pro League.

On 28 May 2024, Vreven was appointed manager of FK Panevėžys.

In February 2025, Vreven was appointed head coach of Lokeren-Temse, regarded as the spiritual successor to his former club Sporting Lokeren. He succeeded Hans Cornelis, who had overseen the club's promotion from the fourth-tier Belgian Division 2 to the second-tier Challenger Pro League. However, results in the higher tier proved difficult, and after 21 matchdays Lokeren-Temse were positioned 13th, only four points from relegation. Following Vreven's arrival, the club's form improved markedly. Lokeren-Temse collected 12 points from his first five matches, a run that effectively secured their place in the division. In late March, the club extended Vreven's contract until 2026. The team went on to win their remaining four fixtures of the regular season, finishing with 24 points from a possible 27 under his management. Lokeren-Temse ultimately placed seventh in the final league standings, qualifying for the promotion play-offs.

== Honours ==
Utrecht

- KNVB Cup: 2002–03
