= Pauline van de Pol =

Indonesian footballer

Personal information
- Full name: Pauline van de Pol
- Date of birth: 12 March 2003 (age 23)
- Place of birth: Haarlem, Netherlands
- Position: Defender

Team information
- Current team: Groningen

Youth career
- Telstar

Senior career*
Years	Team	Apps	(Gls)
2022–2025	Telstar	33	(0)
2025–2026	Hera United	8	(0)
2026–	Groningen	0	(0)

International career^{‡}
2026–	Indonesia	8	(0)
- * Club domestic league appearances and goals as of 2 August 2026 ‡ National team caps and goals as of 2 August 2026

Pauline van de Pol (born 12 March 2003) is a professional footballer who plays as a defender for Vrouwen Tweede Divisie club Groningen. Born in the Netherlands, she plays for the Indonesia national team.

== Club career ==
=== Telstar ===
Van de Pol developed through the youth system of Telstar. She made her debut in the Women's Eredivisie on 2 December 2022, coming on as a substitute for Annemiek Kruijthof in the 85th minute of an away match against Fortuna Sittard.

Van de Pol was promoted to Telstar's first-team squad in 2023. During her time at the club, she made 33 league appearances and scored no goals, according to Soccerway's player statistics.

=== Hera United ===
Following the loss of Telstar's women's football licence, the club's place in the competition was taken over by Hera United, an independent women's football club based in Amsterdam. Van de Pol subsequently played for HERA United during the 2025–26 season, making eight league appearances.

=== FC Groningen ===
In August 2026, Van de Pol joined Groningen, a club competing in the Vrouwen Tweede Divisie. Her arrival was announced as part of the club's presentation of three new players during its open day on 2 August 2026.

== International career ==
Van de Pol obtained Indonesian citizenship through naturalisation in August 2025, alongside two other Dutch women's footballers. The naturalisation enabled her to become eligible to represent Indonesia at international level.

As of 2 August 2026, she had not made an appearance for the Indonesia women's national team in the available player statistics.

== Career statistics ==
Club appearances and goals
Season	Club	League	Appearances	Goals
2022–23	Telstar	Women's Eredivisie	1	0
2023–24	Telstar	Women's Eredivisie	19	0
2024–25	Telstar	Women's Eredivisie	13	0
2025–26	HERA United	Women's Eredivisie	8	0
2026–	FC Groningen	Tweede Divisie	0	0
Total			41	0

Statistics updated as of 2 August 2026.

== See also ==
- List of Indonesia international footballers born outside Indonesia
