= De Klassieker =

Dutch football rivalry between AFC Ajax and Feyenoord

- Other names: Ajax vs Feyenoord
- Location: Netherlands
- Teams: Ajax; Feyenoord
- First meeting: 9 October 1921; 1ste Klasse; Feyenoord 2–2 Ajax
- Latest meeting: 22 March 2026; Eredivisie; Feyenoord 1–1 Ajax

Statistics
- Total meetings: 209
- Most wins: Ajax (96)
- Top scorer: Sjaak Swart (18)
- Largest victory: Ajax 8–2 Feyenoord (18 September 1983); Feyenoord 6–0 Ajax (7 April 2024)

1937 Klassieker.

De Klassieker (The Classic) is the main football rivalry of the Netherlands, between Ajax (of Amsterdam) and Feyenoord (of Rotterdam), two of the traditional Big Three football teams from the Netherlands. The record attendance was on 9 January 1966, when 65,562 watched in Rotterdam.

== Background ==
The rivalry between these two clubs goes beyond the football rivalry, transcending into the city rivalry between Amsterdam and Rotterdam. This rivalry began when these two cities first received their city rights in the 13th century. The football clubs are the pride of these cities; Ajax to Amsterdam and Feyenoord to Rotterdam.

The inhabitants of these cities differ significantly in both attitudes and cultures which is clearly reflected on the football pitch. The clash is seen between the artists of Amsterdam and the workers of Rotterdam. Amsterdam is renowned for its culture, having produced many artists and actors. Ajax’s style of play has long been a source of pride for the supporters, and one of irritation for the Feyenoord fans. The Rotterdammers feel that those hailing from Amsterdam possess delusions of grandeur, and there is a saying to reflect these sentiments: "While Amsterdam dreams, Rotterdam works". Rotterdam was forced to work after being bombed heavily in the Second World War by the Nazis. A harbor town, its people are proud of their work ethic and resentful of Amsterdam's showiness.

== Beginning of the rivalry ==
The first encounter between these two clubs was on 9 October 1921 in Rotterdam which was surrounded by controversy. The match initially ended 3–2 in Ajax' favour. This was later officially declared 2–2 due to Feyenoords protest to what they believed was a dubious goal by Ajax.

There has also been a competition as who has the biggest stadium between these two clubs which mainly occurred in the 1930s and 1940s. This was done as bragging rights as which city, between Amsterdam and Rotterdam, had the biggest stadium in the Netherlands. The Olympic Stadium was constructed in 1928 and had a capacity of 31,600 which was the biggest in the Netherlands. In 1934 De Meer Stadion was constructed with a capacity of 22,000. Ajax used the Olympic Stadium for European matches and De Meer for domestic matches. The status of the Olympic Stadium being the largest in Netherlands would change in 1937 when Feyenoord opened De Kuip was constructed with a capacity of 64,000. Ajax responded by adding a second ring to Olympic Stadium, also in 1937. After the Second World War, Feyenoord expanded De Kuip to 69,000 in 1949.

From the season 1947–48 up to and including 1955–56 no competitive matches were played between these two clubs. This was due to Feyenoord never winning their regional league in this period and hence not reaching the Championship Playoff where they could face Ajax. In order for these clubs to continue playing each other during this period a number of friendlies were arranged. Once the Eredivisie was introduced in 1956–57, regional leagues were abolished in favour of a single national league and hence no championship playoffs were needed. Therefore, Feyenoord and Ajax were able to play competitive matches against each other once more. The two clubs have faced off twice a year since then.

In the season 1960-61 the highest scoring match between these two occurred. The total number of goals scored was 14 where the score was 9–5 in favour of Feyenoord. This season Feyenoord won the league with Ajax being second place with 2 points behind first place. Four years later in the season 1964-65 the same scoreline was almost replicated by a 9–4 scoreline in Feyenoord's favour.

== Rivalry building up ==
This rivalry heated up considerably in the early 1970s when these two clubs were arguably the best in the world and riots started to break between the sets of fans. During the early 1970s Ajax won three European Cups and an Intercontinental Cup, Feyenoord had won one European Cup, one Intercontinental Cup and one UEFA Cup. All these trophies won by Feyenoord at the time were the first to be won by a Dutch club. This success led to the Netherlands squad being filled with a majority of Ajax and Feyenoord players. These players would be important during the 1974 FIFA World Cup and 1978 FIFA World Cup in which they displayed what is known to be Total Football.

During the 1980–81 season, Feyenoord legend Wim Jansen, who played for Feyenoord for 15 years, made the leap to Ajax which created much anger for the Feyenoord fans. On his debut for Ajax, which happened to be an away game against Feyenoord, a Feyenoord fan threw an iceball in Jansen's eye, forcing him to leave the field for treatment. The rivalry intensified even further during the 1983–84 season when Ajax legend Johan Cruyff made the transfer from Ajax to Feyenoord. This was after a contract dispute between Cruyff and Ajax; Cruyff wanted a contract extension, but Ajax balked on account of his age. This transfer angered both fanbases; Ajax fans were outraged that Cruyff had jumped to their biggest rival, while Feyenoord fans did not like the fact that an Ajax legend would be joining their club. Some Feyenoord fans protested his arrival by hanging banners saying "Feyenoord Forever, Cruijff Never" being one of the more civilised ones. Many fans would also whistle and jeer at the newcomer during the friendly pre season games and whenever his name was announced in the stadium. Some fans even refused to enter the stadium whilst Cruyff played there. In the 1983–84 season, Feyenoord and Cruyff lost 8–2 to Ajax in Amsterdam which was Feyenoord's worst loss to them ever. However, Feyenoord won their home game 4-1, and Feyenoord ended up winning the league and cup that season.

Both clubs have fallen from grace over the years, while fan violence has increased, and there is always a heavy police presence at the derby. The most serious incident occurred in the Beverwijk clash in 1997 when Ajax fan Carlo Picornie was killed and several others injured. The riots of 2005 were also a depressing chapter in the history of the two clubs.

On 7 April 2024, Feyenoord beat Ajax 6–0, the biggest win ever for Feyenoord over Ajax and the biggest loss ever for Ajax in the Eredivisie.

De Klassieker scheduled for 1 September 2024 was suspended after a police strike was announced.

== Violence between Ajax and Feyenoord ==
Since the 70's there have been many clashes between the supporters of both clubs, including destructions inside stadiums. The Beverwijk in 1997 was most infamous. One Ajax fan, Carlo Picornie, was beaten to death by rival supporters, triggering more strict policies from the Dutch football association KNVB to tackle hooliganism. As a result of the incident, the two Klassiekers in 1997-98 were played without away fans.

In 2004 Feyenoord player Jorge Acuña was taken to hospital with head, neck and rib injuries after Feyenoord players were attacked by Ajax hooligans during a match between the reserve teams of both clubs. Another Feyenoord player, Robin van Persie, had to be rescued by Ajax coach John van 't Schip and player Daniël de Ridder.

In April 2005, riots took place around Feyenoord's ground involving hooligans from both sides and the riot police. Travelling Ajax fans had demolished the train transporting them to Rotterdam after the train was sent back to Amsterdam before arriving in Rotterdam. The second train arrived in Rotterdam but the fans were forced to wait outside the stadium until the match was over. Meanwhile, Feyenoord supporters who had just seen their team lose 2-3, were determined to clash with rivals from Amsterdam, who had not seen the match. Hooligans filmed by police were shown on national TV. Virtually every hooligan on TV handed himself in.

In February 2009, the mayors of Amsterdam and Rotterdam made an agreement with the KNVB to ban visiting fans from the away games for the next five seasons in an effort to curb the violence. However, after Ajax fans threw fireworks on the field during the 2014 KNVB Cup Final, Ajax banned its supporters from traveling to Rotterdam through at least the 2016-17 season.

In March 2015, the Ajax clubhouse was burned down for which the cause is officially unknown. However the police and Ajax fans suspected Feyenoord fans to have been behind this event. Ajax hooligans planned a revenge attack on Feyenoord fans but were stopped by police.

In February 2016, an incident took place in Amsterdam Arena where an effigy of Kenneth Vermeer, who made the crossing from Ajax to Feyenoord, was hanged from a stand occupied by the Ajax ultra group VAK410. In response, Ajax closed the sections normally used by VAK410 for the next edition of De Klassieker at the Arena, and banned season ticketholders from those sections from attending the match.

Hooligans often chant antisemitic slogans when their team faces Ajax. That is because Ajax has had a long association with the city's Jewish community. And Ajax supporters sometimes refer to themselves as Jews and use the Star of David symbol.

In May 2019, an amateur match between AVV Swift, of Amsterdam, and SC Feyenoord in Amsterdam was marred by fan trouble after the game when Feyenoord fans travelled to Amsterdam to show support for SC Feyenoord and came into contact with Ajax fans who were there to show support for AVV Swift. Later in the same month, there was an incident during the U19 league title deciding game between Ajax and Feyenoord at De Toekomst in Amsterdam. Before the game, Ajax fans threw stones the players bus of Feyenoord U19. After 30 minutes, the match had to be suspended due to Ajax fans trying to attack the Feyenoord players' families in the stands. The match had to be rescheduled to a later date where no fans were allowed to attend the fixture.

On 5 April 2023, during a KNVB Cup semifinal, Ajax player Davy Klaassen was hit with a lighter from the stands during the 62nd minute of the game. The match was suspended for 30 minutes and he was substituted as a result of a head injury.

The match between the clubs on 24 September 2023 was suspended until further notice after Ajax fans, with Feyenoord winning 3–0, threw flares onto the pitch. After the match fans clashed with police. The game was resumed on 27 September 2023, which ended with Feyenoord winning 4-0 behind closed doors.

== Honours ==
Ajax and Feyenoord are the first and third most successful clubs in the Netherlands respectively, with Ajax winning more silverware than Feyenoord in nearly every competition: 75 to 39. This total includes both domestic and international trophies. Both clubs had their greatest international success in the early 1970s, when they were considered to be two of the best clubs in the world. During this time, Ajax won three European Cups, whereas Feyenoord won one European Cup and one UEFA Cup.

As of 1 November 2026

Competition	Ajax	Feyenoord
Eredivisie	36	16
KNVB Cup	20	14
Johan Cruyff Shield (Dutch Super Cup)	9	5
National total	65	35
European Cup/UEFA Champions League	4	1
UEFA Cup/UEFA Europa League	1	2
UEFA Conference League	0	0
European Cup Winners' Cup	1	0
UEFA Super Cup	2 (Note: Ajax also won the 1972 European Super Cup, but is considered unofficial by UEFA; hence, only the 1973 and 1995 cups are included)	0
Intercontinental Cup	2	1
International total	10	4
Grand total	75	39

== Statistics (since 1921) ==
As of 22 March 2026

Matches
Stage		M	AJX	D	FEY	GAJX	GFEY
AJX	Dutch top league	172	79	46	48	355	261
AJX	Dutch Premier League play-offs	5	3	0	2	15	13
AJX	KNVB Cup	18	9	1	8	33	22
AJX	Johan Cruyff Shield (Dutch Super Cup)	4	3	0	1	11	4
FEY	Other	9	2	3	4	19	20
AJX	Total	209	96	50	63	433	326
M – matches; D – draws; AJX – victories Ajax; FEY – victories Feyenoord; GAJX – goals Ajax; GFEY – goals Feyenoord;

== Results (since 1921) ==
1920s
Game	Season	Date	Result	Tournament
Feyenoord – Ajax	1921–22	9 October 1921	2–2	1ste Klasse
Ajax – Feyenoord	1921–22	5 March 1922	2–0	1ste Klasse
Feyenoord – Ajax	1922–23	29 October 1922	1–1	1ste Klasse
Ajax – Feyenoord	1922–23	21 January 1923	0–2	1ste Klasse
Feyenoord – Ajax	1923–24	20 January 1924	1–3	1ste Klasse
Ajax – Feyenoord	1923–24	6 April 1924	1–1	1ste Klasse
Feyenoord – Ajax	1925–26	4 October 1925	2–0	1ste Klasse
Ajax – Feyenoord	1925–26	7 February 1926	2–2	1ste Klasse
Ajax – Feyenoord	1926–27	27 March 1927	0–2	Kampioenscompetitie
Feyenoord – Ajax	1926–27	22 May 1927	2–3	Kampioenscompetitie
Feyenoord – Ajax	1927–28	8 April 1928	1–0	Kampioenscompetitie
Ajax – Feyenoord	1927–28	9 April 1928	0–3	Kampioenscompetitie
Ajax – Feyenoord	1929–30	4 June 1930	1–2	KNVB Cup

1930s
Game	Season	Date	Result	Tournament
Feyenoord – Ajax	1930–31	10 May 1931	5–2	Kampioenscompetitie
Ajax – Feyenoord	1930–31	3 June 1931	2–2	Kampioenscompetitie
Feyenoord – Ajax	1931–32	1 May 1932	2–4	Kampioenscompetitie
Ajax – Feyenoord	1931–32	5 May 1932	1–3	Kampioenscompetitie
Ajax – Feyenoord	1933–34	8 October 1933	7–1	1ste Klasse
Feyenoord – Ajax	1933–34	7 January 1934	1–4	1ste Klasse
Ajax – Feyenoord	1934–35	11 November 1934	4–0	1ste Klasse
Feyenoord – Ajax	1934–35	10 March 1935	2–4	1ste Klasse
Ajax – Feyenoord	1935	20 October 1935	0–1	Friendly
Ajax – Feyenoord	1935–36	19 April 1936	1–4	Kampioenscompetitie
Feyenoord – Ajax	1935–36	14 June 1936	3–6	Kampioenscompetitie
Feyenoord – Ajax	1936–37	11 April 1937	3–0	Kampioenscompetitie
Ajax – Feyenoord	1936–37	23 May 1937	2–0	Kampioenscompetitie
Feyenoord – Ajax	1938–39	2 October 1937	1–0	1ste Klasse
Ajax – Feyenoord	1938–39	22 January 1939	5–0	1ste Klasse

1940s
Game	Season	Date	Result	Tournament
Ajax – Feyenoord	1941–42	12 October 1941	2–1	1ste Klasse
Feyenoord – Ajax	1941–42	21 December 1941	2–0	1ste Klasse
Ajax – Feyenoord	1942–43	27 September 1942	2–3	1ste Klasse
Feyenoord – Ajax	1942–43	6 December 1942	2–0	1ste Klasse
Feyenoord – Ajax	1943–44	10 October 1943	2–1	1ste Klasse
Ajax – Feyenoord	1943–44	9 January 1944	3–0	1ste Klasse
Feyenoord – Ajax	1945	28 July 1945	1–3	Friendly
Ajax – Feyenoord	1945	5 August 1945	1–3	Friendly
Feyenoord – Ajax	1946–47	10 November 1946	5–3	1ste Klasse
Ajax – Feyenoord	1946–47	11 May 1947	1–1	1ste Klasse

1950s
Game	Season	Date	Result	Tournament
Feyenoord – Ajax	1950	5 March 1950	2–2	Friendly
Ajax – Feyenoord	1950	19 March 1950	1–4	Friendly
Ajax – Feyenoord	1951	5 May 1951	2–2	Friendly
Feyenoord – Ajax	1952	1 March 1952	2–1	Friendly
Feyenoord – Ajax	1955	14 August 1955	3–3	Friendly
Feyenoord – Ajax	1956–57	11 November 1956	7–3	Eredivisie
Ajax – Feyenoord	1956–57	17 March 1957	1–0	Eredivisie
Ajax – Feyenoord	1957–58	13 October 1957	1–2	Eredivisie
Feyenoord – Ajax	1957–58	30 March 1958	1–3	Eredivisie
Ajax – Feyenoord	1958–59	9 November 1958	3–1	Eredivisie
Feyenoord – Ajax	1958–59	5 April 1959	0–5	Eredivisie
Ajax – Feyenoord	1959–60	20 December 1959	4–1	Eredivisie
Feyenoord – Ajax	1959–60	22 May 1960	3–0	Eredivisie
Ajax – Feyenoord	1959–60	26 May 1960	5–1	Eredivisie play-offs
Ajax – Feyenoord	1959–60	6 June 1960	1–6	Plaatsing Europacup
Feyenoord – Ajax	1959–60	18 June 1960	4–2	Plaatsing Europacup

1960s
Game	Season	Date	Result	Tournament
Feyenoord – Ajax	1960–61	28 August 1960	9–5	Eredivisie
Ajax – Feyenoord	1960–61	5 February 1961	0–1	Eredivisie
Ajax – Feyenoord	1961–62	15 October 1961	1–3	Eredivisie
Feyenoord – Ajax	1961–62	18 March 1962	1–2	Eredivisie
Ajax – Feyenoord	1961–62	26 April 1962	4–2	UEFA Intertoto Cup
Feyenoord – Ajax	1962–63	2 September 1962	1–1	Eredivisie
Ajax – Feyenoord	1962–63	24 March 1963	1–3	Eredivisie
Feyenoord – Ajax	1963–64	22 September 1963	1–1	Eredivisie
Ajax – Feyenoord	1963–64	16 February 1964	1–1	Eredivisie
Feyenoord – Ajax	1964–65	29 November 1964	9–4	Eredivisie
Ajax – Feyenoord	1964–65	19 April 1965	1–1	Eredivisie
Feyenoord – Ajax	1965–66	9 January 1966	1–1	Eredivisie
Ajax – Feyenoord	1965–66	18 May 1966	2–0	Eredivisie
Ajax – Feyenoord	1966–67	13 November 1966	5–0	Eredivisie
Feyenoord – Ajax	1966–67	27 March 1967	1–1	Eredivisie
Ajax – Feyenoord	1966–67	2 April 1967	KNVB Cup	3–1
Feyenoord – Ajax	1967–68	3 September 1967	1–0	Eredivisie
Ajax – Feyenoord	1967–68	10 March 1968	1–0	Eredivisie
Ajax – Feyenoord	1968–69	17 November 1968	0–1	Eredivisie
Ajax – Feyenoord	1968–69	9 March 1969	1–2	KNVB Cup
Feyenoord – Ajax	1968–69	20 April 1969	1–1	Eredivisie

1970s
Game	Season	Date	Result	Tournament
Feyenoord – Ajax	1969–70	2 November 1969	1–0	Eredivisie
Ajax – Feyenoord	1969–70	26 April 1970	3–3	Eredivisie
Feyenoord – Ajax	1970–71	20 December 1970	1–1	Eredivisie
Ajax – Feyenoord	1970–71	27 May 1971	1–3	Eredivisie
Feyenoord – Ajax	1970–71	7 April 1971	1–2	KNVB Cup
Ajax – Feyenoord	1971–72	7 November 1971	2–1	Eredivisie
Feyenoord – Ajax	1971–72	15 April 1972	1–5	Eredivisie
Feyenoord – Ajax	1972–73	17 September 1972	2–0	Eredivisie
Ajax – Feyenoord	1972–73	3 March 1973	2–1	Eredivisie
Ajax – Feyenoord	1973–74	23 November 1973	2–1	Eredivisie
Feyenoord – Ajax	1973–74	17 February 1974	2–2	Eredivisie
Feyenoord – Ajax	1974–75	27 October 1974	2–1	Eredivisie
Ajax – Feyenoord	1974–75	9 March 1975	0–1	Eredivisie
Ajax – Feyenoord	1975–76	1 November 1975	6–0	Eredivisie
Feyenoord – Ajax	1975–76	4 April 1976	4–1	Eredivisie
Feyenoord – Ajax	1976–77	14 November 1976	1–1	Eredivisie
Ajax – Feyenoord	1976–77	24 April 1977	2–1	Eredivisie
Ajax – Feyenoord	1977–78	4 September 1977	2–2	Eredivisie
Feyenoord – Ajax	1977–78	12 February 1978	1–1	Eredivisie
Ajax – Feyenoord	1978–79	28 October 1978	0–0	Eredivisie
Feyenoord – Ajax	1978–79	29 April 1979	1–1	Eredivisie
Feyenoord – Ajax	1979–80	29 September 1979	4–0	Eredivisie
Ajax – Feyenoord	1979–80	9 March 1980	1–1	Eredivisie
Feyenoord – Ajax	1979–80	17 May 1980	3–1	KNVB Cup

1980s
Game	Season	Date	Result	Tournament
Feyenoord – Ajax	1980–81	7 December 1980	4–2	Eredivisie
Ajax – Feyenoord	1980–81	24 May 1981	4–1	Eredivisie
Ajax – Feyenoord	1981–82	19 August 1981	1–1	Eredivisie
Feyenoord – Ajax	1981–82	31 January 1982	2–2	Eredivisie
Feyenoord – Ajax	1982–83	28 November 1982	2–2	Eredivisie
Ajax – Feyenoord	1982–83	1 May 1983	3–3	Eredivisie
Ajax – Feyenoord	1983–84	18 September 1983	8–2	Eredivisie
Ajax – Feyenoord	1983–84	25 January 1984	2–2	KNVB Cup
Feyenoord – Ajax	1983–84	15 February 1984	2–1 (a.e.t.)	KNVB Cup
Feyenoord – Ajax	1983–84	26 February 1984	4–1	Eredivisie
Feyenoord – Ajax	1984–85	25 November 1984	1–3	Eredivisie
Ajax – Feyenoord	1984–85	19 May 1985	4–2	Eredivisie
Ajax – Feyenoord	1985–86	6 October 1985	1–2	Eredivisie
Feyenoord – Ajax	1985–86	31 March 1986	3–1	Eredivisie
Feyenoord – Ajax	1986–87	2 November 1986	2–3	Eredivisie
Ajax – Feyenoord	1986–87	17 May 1987	1–3	Eredivisie
Ajax – Feyenoord	1987–88	1 November 1987	3–1	Eredivisie
Feyenoord – Ajax	1987–88	24 April 1988	1–3	Eredivisie
Feyenoord – Ajax	1988–89	13 November 1988	1–2	Eredivisie
Ajax – Feyenoord	1988–89	16 April 1989	4–1	Eredivisie
Ajax – Feyenoord	1989–90	22 October 1989	1–1	Eredivisie
Feyenoord – Ajax	1989–90	1 April 1990	0–1	Eredivisie

1990s
Game	Season	Date	Result	Tournament
Feyenoord – Ajax	1990–91	9 December 1990	0–4	Eredivisie
Ajax – Feyenoord	1990–91	20 May 1991	2–0	Eredivisie
Feyenoord – Ajax	1991–92	17 November 1991	2–0	Eredivisie
Ajax – Feyenoord	1991–92	22 December 1991	3–1	Eredivisie
Feyenoord – Ajax	1991–92	8 March 1992	1–0	KNVB Cup
Feyenoord – Ajax	1992–93	15 November 1992	0–3	Eredivisie
Feyenoord – Ajax	1992–93	31 March 1993	0–5	KNVB Cup
Ajax – Feyenoord	1992–93	9 May 1993	5–2	Eredivisie
Feyenoord – Ajax	1993–94	8 August 1993	0–4	Johan Cruyff Shield
Ajax – Feyenoord	1993–94	24 October 1993	2–2	Eredivisie
Feyenoord – Ajax	1993–94	27 March 1994	2–1	Eredivisie
Ajax – Feyenoord	1994–95	21 August 1994	3–0	Johan Cruyff Shield
Ajax – Feyenoord	1994–95	22 February 1995	4–1	Eredivisie
Ajax – Feyenoord	1994–95	8 March 1995	1–2 (a.e.t.)	KNVB Cup
Feyenoord – Ajax	1994–95	18 May 1995	0–5	Eredivisie
Feyenoord – Ajax	1995–96	16 August 1995	1–2 (a.e.t.)	Johan Cruyff Shield
Feyenoord – Ajax	1995–96	22 October 1995	2–4	Eredivisie
Ajax – Feyenoord	1995–96	24 March 1996	2–0	Eredivisie
Feyenoord – Ajax	1996–97	24 November 1996	2–2	Eredivisie
Ajax – Feyenoord	1996–97	23 February 1997	3–0	Eredivisie
Ajax – Feyenoord	1997–98	26 October 1997	4–0	Eredivisie
Feyenoord – Ajax	1997–98	5 April 1998	0–1	Eredivisie
Feyenoord – Ajax	1998–99	20 December 1998	1–1	Eredivisie
Ajax – Feyenoord	1998–99	14 April 1999	2–1	KNVB Cup
Ajax – Feyenoord	1998–99	2 May 1999	6–0	Eredivisie
Ajax – Feyenoord	1999–2000	8 August 1999	2–3	Johan Cruyff Shield
Ajax – Feyenoord	1999–2000	10 September 1999	2–2	Eredivisie
Feyenoord – Ajax	1999–2000	23 April 2000	1–1	Eredivisie

2000s
Game	Season	Date	Result	Tournament
Feyenoord – Ajax	2000–01	10 December 2000	3–1	Eredivisie
Ajax – Feyenoord	2000–01	13 May 2001	3–4	Eredivisie
Feyenoord – Ajax	2001–02	26 August 2001	1–2	Eredivisie
Ajax – Feyenoord	2001–02	3 March 2002	1–1	Eredivisie
Feyenoord – Ajax	2002–03	6 October 2002	1–2	Eredivisie
Ajax – Feyenoord	2002–03	9 February 2003	1–1	Eredivisie
Feyenoord – Ajax	2002–03	16 April 2003	1–0	KNVB Cup
Ajax – Feyenoord	2003–04	30 November 2003	2–0	Eredivisie
Feyenoord – Ajax	2003–04	11 April 2004	1–1	Eredivisie
Ajax – Feyenoord	2004–05	14 November 2004	1–1	Eredivisie
Feyenoord – Ajax	2004–05	17 April 2005	2–3	Eredivisie
Ajax – Feyenoord	2005–06	28 August 2005	1–2	Eredivisie
Feyenoord – Ajax	2005–06	5 February 2006	3–2	Eredivisie
Ajax – Feyenoord	2005–06	20 April 2006	3–0	Eredivisie play-offs
Feyenoord – Ajax	2005–06	23 April 2006	2–4	Eredivisie play-offs
Feyenoord – Ajax	2006–07	22 October 2006	0–4	Eredivisie
Ajax – Feyenoord	2006–07	4 February 2007	4–1	Eredivisie
Feyenoord – Ajax	2007–08	11 November 2007	2–2	Eredivisie
Ajax – Feyenoord	2007–08	3 February 2008	3–0	Eredivisie
Feyenoord – Ajax	2008–09	21 September 2008	2–2	Eredivisie
Ajax – Feyenoord	2008–09	15 February 2009	2–0	Eredivisie
Ajax – Feyenoord	2009–10	1 November 2009	5–1	Eredivisie
Feyenoord – Ajax	2009–10	31 January 2010	1–1	Eredivisie
Ajax – Feyenoord	2009–10	25 April 2010	2–0	KNVB Cup
Feyenoord – Ajax	2009–10	6 May 2010	1–4	KNVB Cup

2010s
Game	Season	Date	Result	Tournament
Feyenoord – Ajax	2010–11	19 September 2010	1–2	Eredivisie
Ajax – Feyenoord	2010–11	19 January 2011	2–0	Eredivisie
Ajax – Feyenoord	2011–12	23 October 2011	1–1	Eredivisie
Feyenoord – Ajax	2011–12	29 January 2012	4–2	Eredivisie
Feyenoord – Ajax	2012–13	28 October 2012	2–2	Eredivisie
Ajax – Feyenoord	2012–13	20 January 2013	3–0	Eredivisie
Ajax – Feyenoord	2013–14	18 August 2013	2–1	Eredivisie
Ajax – Feyenoord	2013–14	22 January 2014	3–1	KNVB Cup
Feyenoord – Ajax	2013–14	2 March 2014	1–2	Eredivisie
Feyenoord – Ajax	2014–15	21 September 2014	0–1	Eredivisie
Ajax – Feyenoord	2014–15	25 January 2015	0–0	Eredivisie
Feyenoord – Ajax	2015–16	28 October 2015	1–0	KNVB Cup
Feyenoord – Ajax	2015–16	8 November 2015	1–1	Eredivisie
Ajax – Feyenoord	2015–16	7 February 2016	2–1	Eredivisie
Feyenoord – Ajax	2016–17	23 October 2016	1–1	Eredivisie
Ajax – Feyenoord	2016–17	2 April 2017	2–1	Eredivisie
Feyenoord – Ajax	2017–18	22 October 2017	1–4	Eredivisie
Ajax – Feyenoord	2017–18	21 January 2018	2–0	Eredivisie
Ajax – Feyenoord	2018–19	28 October 2018	3–0	Eredivisie
Feyenoord – Ajax	2018–19	27 January 2019	6–2	Eredivisie
Feyenoord – Ajax	2018–19	27 February 2019	0–3	KNVB Cup
Ajax – Feyenoord	2019–20	27 October 2019	4–0	Eredivisie
Feyenoord – Ajax	2019–20	22 March 2020	cancelled	Eredivisie

2020s
Game	Season	Date	Result	Tournament
Ajax – Feyenoord	2020–21	17 January 2021	1–0	Eredivisie
Feyenoord – Ajax	2020–21	9 May 2021	0–3	Eredivisie
Feyenoord – Ajax	2021–22	19 December 2021	0–2	Eredivisie
Ajax – Feyenoord	2021–22	20 March 2022	3–2	Eredivisie
Feyenoord – Ajax	2022–23	22 January 2023	1–1	Eredivisie
Ajax – Feyenoord	2022–23	19 March 2023	2–3	Eredivisie
Feyenoord – Ajax	2022–23	5 April 2023	1–2	KNVB Cup
Ajax – Feyenoord	2023–24	24 September 2023	0–4	Eredivisie
Feyenoord – Ajax	2023–24	7 April 2024	6–0	Eredivisie
Feyenoord – Ajax	2024–25	30 October 2024	0–2	Eredivisie
Ajax – Feyenoord	2024–25	2 February 2025	2–1	Eredivisie
Ajax – Feyenoord	2025–26	14 December 2025	2–0	Eredivisie
Feyenoord – Ajax	2025–26	22 March 2026	1–1	Eredivisie

== Records ==
=== All-time top scorers ===
As of 22 January 2023

Rank	Player	Nationality	Club	Goals
1.	Sjaak Swart	Netherlands	Ajax (18)	18
2.	Cor van der Gijp	Netherlands	Feyenoord (14)	14
3.	Piet van Reenen	Netherlands	Ajax (13)	13
4.	Jari Litmanen	Finland	Ajax (12)	12
5.	Ruud Geels	Netherlands	Ajax (10); Feyenoord (1)	11
5.	Henk Groot	Netherlands	Ajax (9); Feyenoord (2)	11
7.	Klaas-Jan Huntelaar	Netherlands	Ajax (10)	10
8.	Jaap Barendregt	Netherlands	Feyenoord (9)	9
8.	Marco van Basten	Netherlands	Ajax (9)	9
8.	Johan Cruyff	Netherlands	Ajax (8); Feyenoord (1)	9
11.	Erwin van Wijngaarden	Netherlands	Ajax (8)	8
11.	Peter Houtman	Netherlands	Feyenoord (8)	8
11.	Dirk Kuyt	Netherlands	Feyenoord (8)	8
14.	Siem de Jong	Netherlands	Ajax (7)	7
14.	Ronald de Boer	Netherlands	Ajax (7)	7
14.	Henk Schouten	Netherlands	Feyenoord (7)	7
14.	Jon Dahl Tomasson	Denmark	Feyenoord (7)	7

=== Highest-scoring matches (8+ goals) ===
Goals	Scoreline	Date
14	Feyenoord 9–5 Ajax	28 August 1960
13	Feyenoord 9–4 Ajax	29 November 1964
10	Feyenoord 7–3 Ajax	11 November 1956
10	Ajax 8–2 Feyenoord	18 September 1983
9	Feyenoord 3–6 Ajax	14 June 1963
8	Ajax 7–1 Feyenoord	8 October 1933
8	Feyenoord 5–3 Ajax	10 November 1946
8	Feyenoord 6–2 Ajax	27 January 2019

== Crossing the divide ==
There have been quite a few players who have played for both Ajax and Feyenoord. The most controversial players have been Johan Cruyff, Wim Jansen and, most recently, Steven Berghuis. Hans Kraay Sr. and Leo Beenhakker have trained both clubs (with Kraay Sr. also having played at Feyenoord), while Peter Bosz was a player and technical director at Feyenoord and later coach at Ajax.

Ruud Geels and Ronald Koeman are the only former players to have played at the traditional 'Big Three' of Dutch professional football, having been a player at Feyenoord, Ajax, and their Eindhoven rivals PSV. Hans Kraay Sr. was the first person to have coached at all the Big Three teams. Ronald Koeman also coached all three teams, making him the only person to hold the distinction of both playing and coaching at the 'Big Three'.

=== From Feyenoord to Ajax ===
Name	Nationality	Year	Direct / indirect transfer	Reference
Henk Groot	Netherlands	1965	Direct transfer	
Ruud Geels	Netherlands	1974	Not a direct transfer	
Jan Everse	Netherlands	1977	Direct transfer	
Wim Jansen	Netherlands	1980	Not a direct transfer	
Jan Sørensen	Denmark	1987	Not a direct transfer	
Arnold Scholten	Netherlands	1995	Direct transfer	
Dean Gorré	Netherlands	1997	Not a direct transfer	
Richard Knopper	Netherlands	1997	Played in the Feyenoord youth system	
Henk Timmer	Netherlands	2002	Direct loan transfer	
Leonardo	Brazil	2007	Not a direct transfer	
Evander Sno	Netherlands	2008	Not a direct transfer	
Ronald Graafland	Netherlands	2010	Direct transfer	
Anwar El Ghazi	Netherlands	2013	Played in the Feyenoord youth system	
Kostas Lamprou	Greece	2017	Not a direct transfer	
Oussama Idrissi	Morocco	2021	Played in the Feyenoord youth system	
Steven Berghuis	Netherlands	2021	Direct transfer	
Sofyan Amrabat	Morocco	2026	Not a direct transfer	

=== From Ajax to Feyenoord ===
Name	Nationality	Year	Direct / indirect transfer	Reference
Eddy Pieters Graafland	Netherlands	1958	Direct transfer	
Henk Groot	Netherlands	1963	Direct transfer	
Theo van Duivenbode	Netherlands	1969	Direct transfer	
René Notten	Netherlands	1977	Direct transfer	
Johan Cruyff	Netherlands	1983	Direct transfer	
Johnny Rep	Netherlands	1984	Not a direct transfer	
Simon Tahamata	Netherlands	1984	Not a direct transfer	
Keje Molenaar	Netherlands	1985	Not a direct transfer	
Tscheu La Ling	Netherlands	1986	Not a direct transfer	
Martin van Geel	Netherlands	1988	Not a direct transfer	
Arnold Scholten	Netherlands	1989	Direct transfer	
Rob Witschge	Netherlands	1990	Not a direct transfer	
Harvey Esajas	Netherlands	1992	Played in the Ajax youth system	
John van Loen	Netherlands	1993	Direct transfer	
Ronald Koeman	Netherlands	1995	Not a direct transfer	
Peter van Vossen	Netherlands	1998	Not a direct transfer	
Diego Biseswar	Netherlands	2001	Played in the Ajax youth system	
Evander Sno	Netherlands	2005	Played in the Ajax youth system	
Henk Timmer	Netherlands	2006	Not a direct transfer	
Angelos Charisteas	Greece	2006	Direct transfer	
Tim de Cler	Netherlands	2007	Not a direct transfer	
Ronald Graafland	Netherlands	2011	Direct transfer	
John Goossens	Netherlands	2012	Played in the Ajax youth system	
Bilal Basacikoglu	Netherlands/Turkey	2014	Played in the Ajax youth system	
Warner Hahn	Netherlands	2014	Not a direct transfer	
Kenneth Vermeer	Netherlands	2014	Direct transfer	
Marko Vejinović	Netherlands	2015	Played in the Ajax youth system	
Jan-Arie van der Heijden	Netherlands	2015	Not a direct transfer	
Eljero Elia	Netherlands	2015	Played in the Ajax youth system	
Danilo	Brazil	2022	Direct transfer	
Javairô Dilrosun	Netherlands	2022	Played in the Ajax youth system	
Quinten Timber	Netherlands	2022	Not a direct transfer	
Kostas Lamprou	Greece	2023	Not a direct transfer	

=== Managers, directors, and others ===
Name	Nationality	Club	Background	Reference
Hans Kraay Sr.	Netherlands	Ajax	Manager 1974–75	
Hans Kraay Sr.	Netherlands	Feyenoord	Player 1961–68; manager 1982–83 and 1988–89	
Arie Haan	Netherlands	Ajax	Player 1967–75	
Arie Haan	Netherlands	Feyenoord	Manager 1995–97	
Leo Beenhakker	Netherlands	Ajax	Manager 1979–81 and 1989–91; technical director 2000–03	
Leo Beenhakker	Netherlands	Feyenoord	Manager 1997–2000 and 2007 (interim)	
Ronald Koeman	Netherlands	Ajax	Manager 2002–05	
Ronald Koeman	Netherlands	Feyenoord	Manager 2011–14	
Peter Bosz	Netherlands	Ajax	Manager 2016–17	
Peter Bosz	Netherlands	Feyenoord	Player 1991–96; technical director 2006–09	
Jaap Stam	Netherlands	Ajax	Player 2006–07	
Jaap Stam	Netherlands	Feyenoord	Manager 2019	
Jan Wouters	Netherlands	Ajax	Player 1985–91; manager 1999–2000	
Jan Wouters	Netherlands	Feyenoord	Assistant manager 2015–18	
Martin van Geel	Netherlands	Ajax	Technical director 2005–08	
Martin van Geel	Netherlands	Feyenoord	Technical director 2011–19	

== See also ==
- Big Three (Netherlands)
- AFC Ajax–PSV Eindhoven rivalry
- Amsterdam derby
- Rotterdam derby
- Twentse Derby
- List of association football rivalries
