= Edward Sturing =

Dutch footballer and manager

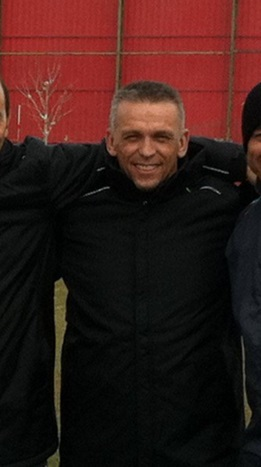
- Sturing in 2016

Personal information
- Full name: Edward Jeroen Sturing
- Date of birth: 13 June 1963 (age 63)
- Place of birth: Apeldoorn, Netherlands
- Position: Defender

Senior career*
Years	Team	Apps	(Gls)
1982–1987	De Graafschap	123	(1)
1987–1998	Vitesse	329	(3)
Total		452	(4)

International career
1989–1990	Netherlands	3	(0)

Managerial career
- 1999–2003: Vitesse (assistant/caretaker)
- 2003–2006: Vitesse
- 2008–2009: Vitesse (assistant/caretaker)
- 2009–2010: Volendam
- 2012–2013: Gençlerbirliği (assistant)
- 2013–2014: Kayseri Erciyesspor (assistant)
- 2014–2016: Jong Vitesse (assistant)
- 2016–2020: Vitesse (assistant)
- 2018: Vitesse (caretaker)
- 2020: Vitesse (caretaker)
- 2023–2024: Vitesse
- * Club domestic league appearances and goals

Edward Jeroen Sturing (born 13 June 1963) is a Dutch professional football manager and former player who was most recently the manager of Vitesse. Sturing played as a defender and earned three caps for the Netherlands national team.

== Career ==
Sturing played for De Graafschap and Vitesse, with whom he won the Eerste Divisie championship in 1989. He was also voted best player of the Eredivisie in the 1989–90 season. After his playing career, Sturing worked at Vitesse as assistant coach and manager. From June 2009 until February 2010, he also served as manager of Volendam. He became assistant at Gençlerbirliği and Kayseri Erciyesspor from 2012 to 2014, before returning to Vitesse, where he was once again an assistant manager. Besides that position, Sturing also participates in representative and ceremonial tasks for the club.

The North Stand at Vitesse's GelreDome was named in his honour in 2016.

== Honours ==
=== Player ===
Vitesse

- Eerste Divisie: 1988–89
- KNVB Cup runner-up: 1989–90

=== Manager ===
Vitesse

- Eredivisie European competition play-offs: 2017–18

Individual

- Golden Boot: 1989–90
