= Sportpark Sloten =

Sports complex in Amsterdam, Netherlands

- Interactive map of Sportpark Sloten
- Full name: Sportpark Sloten
- Location: Amsterdam, Netherlands
- Coordinates: 52°20′20″N 4°48′26″E
- Owner: Gemeente Amsterdam; Stadion Amsterdam N.V.
- Capacity: 2,000 seats (matches)
- Surface: Grass

Construction
- Built: 1953–1956

Tenants
- FC Blauw-Wit (since 1965); ZRC/Herenmarkt (since 1967, resp. 1994); Amsterdam Crusaders (since 1984); AHC Quick (since 1989); De Beursbengels (since 2004); Nieuw Sloten (since 2004)

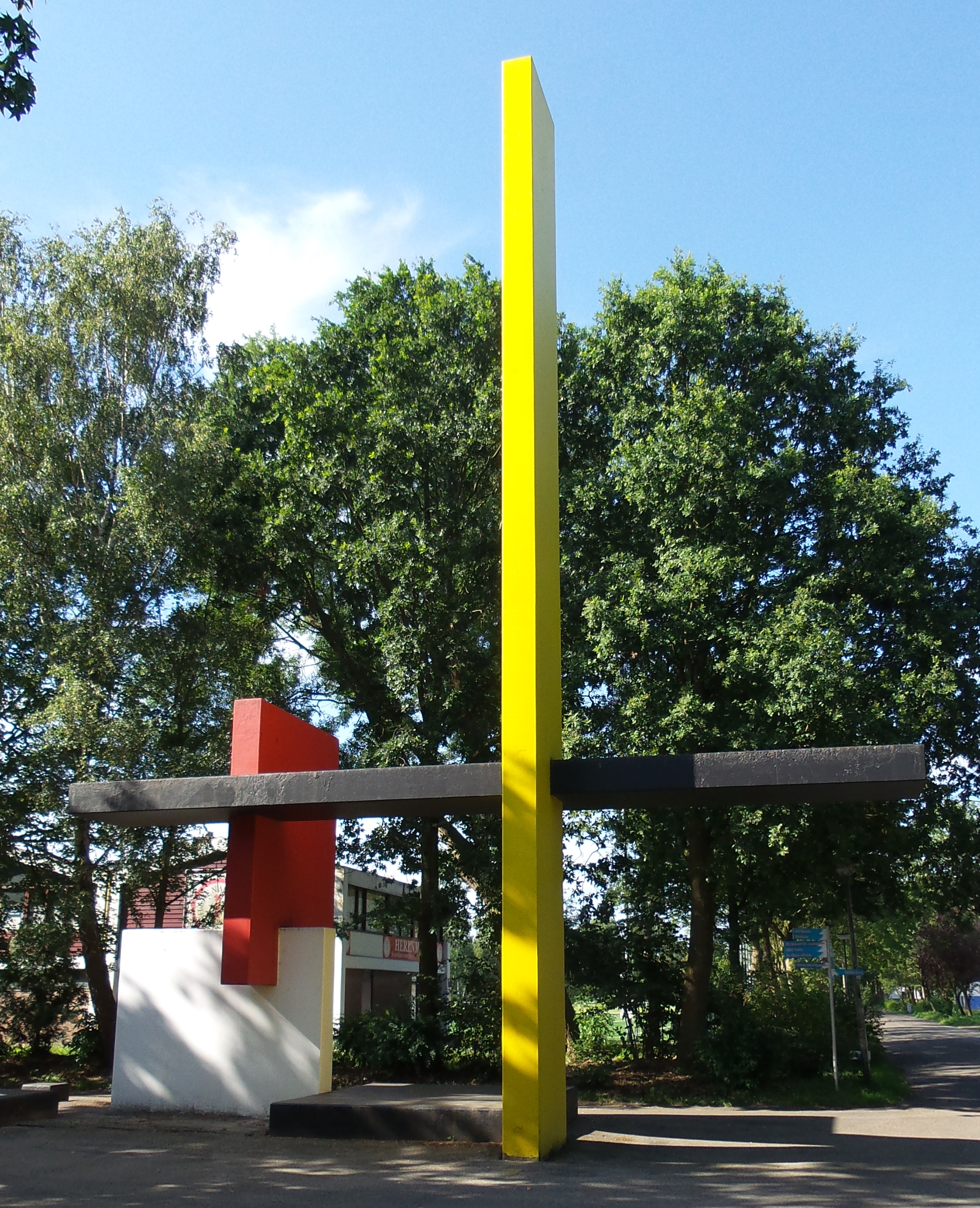
Sculpture of J. Ongenae at the entrance of the sportpark.

Established in 1956, the Sportpark Sloten is a large sports complex located in Sloten, Amsterdam, Netherlands. Surrounding the stadium is an asphalt cycling circuit, 2.5 km in length.

Stadia:

- The Velodrome Amsterdam, is one of only three covered Velodromes in the Netherlands, and played host to the annual Zesdaagse van Amsterdam (2001-2016)
- The gymnastics-hall Turnace.

Several sport clubs are tenants of the complex, such as:

- FC Blauw-Wit (since 1965), ZRC/Herenmarkt (since 1967, resp. 1994), Beursbengels and Nieuw Sloten (since 2004 each),
- American football-club Amsterdam Crusaders
- The Golf course Sloten.
