= Ed Engelkes =

Dutch football manager (born 1964)

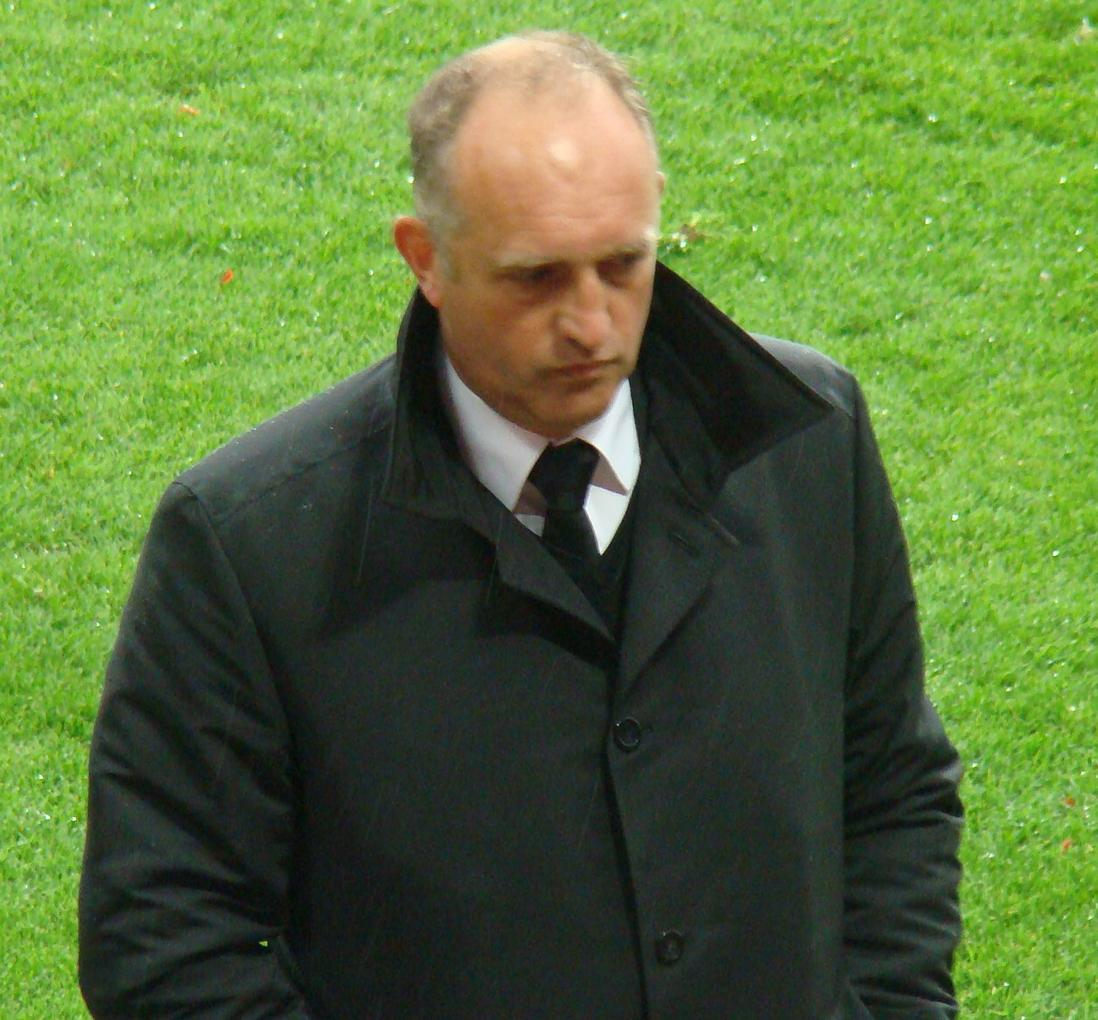
- Engelkes in 2010

Personal information
- Full name: Edwin Paulus Engelkes
- Date of birth: 21 January 1964 (age 62)
- Place of birth: Haarlem, Netherlands

Managerial career
- Years: Team
- 2004–2012: Netherlands Women (assistant)
- 2007–2011: AZ Women
- 2010–2012: Netherlands Women (interim)
- 2012–2017: Ajax Women
- 2014–2017: VVOG
- 2021–2022: RoundGlass Punjab (interim)

Edwin Paulus Engelkes (born 21 January 1964) is a Dutch football manager. He was the head coach of I-League club RoundGlass Punjab. He has also coached Ajax Women and VVOG.

== Playing career ==
Engelkes started playing football at amateur club Alliance '22 from his hometown, Haarlem. Soon, he was scouted by a professional football club, HFC Haarlem. However, he would only appear for their reserve team, and during his early twenties, he expressed interest in becoming a manager.

== Managerial career ==
=== Early career ===
Engelkes started his managerial career at HFC Haarlem, where he coached young players between the ages of 14 and 18. Subsequently, he moved to HBC from Heemstede, where he became a youth coach as well as assistant coach of the first team. During this time, he was also responsible for the youth academy of neighbouring club VV SIZO, from Hillegom.

=== KNVB ===
In 1990, Engelkes was employed by the Royal Dutch Football Association (KNVB), where he was responsible for technical affairs, such as visiting football clubs in the Netherlands, the organisation of street football tournaments and the scouting of young talent for the KNVB's national youth teams.

=== Netherlands Women ===
In 2004, Engelkes became assistant coach of the Netherlands women's national football team, working alongside new head coach Vera Pauw. In addition, Engelkes worked as coordinator of all women's teams of the KNVB. As assistant coach, Engelkes saw the Netherlands Women qualify for their first major international tournament, the UEFA Women's Euro 2009, where they reached the semi-finals. In April 2010, when Pauw left her post with the Netherlands Women, Engelkes was appointed interim head coach. On 1 November 2010, he was succeeded by Roger Reijners and returned to being assistant coach. He fulfilled this position until May 2012.

=== AZ Women ===
Meanwhile, in 2007, AZ formed a women's team to compete in the newly formed Women's Eredivisie, and Engelkes became their manager in addition to his work as assistant with the Netherlands women's team. He led AZ to the Eredivisie title in each of his first three years in charge, from 2007–08 until 2009–10, and also won the KNVB Women's Cup, in 2010–11. After the 2010–11 season, AZ's women's team ceased to exist due to financial difficulties, which ended Engelkes' AZ tenure.

=== Ajax Women ===
On 30 May 2012, it was announced that Engelkes would become manager of the newly formed Ajax women's team from the 2012–13 season, the start of the BeNe League. He said: "The chance to be working at Ajax is a once in a lifetime opportunity. I am proud to do this job." In the 2013–14 season, he led Ajax to victory in the KNVB Women's Cup. In the 2015–16 season, Ajax finished as runners-up in the reinstated Women's Eredivisie. On 26 January 2017, Ajax announced that the 2016–17 season would be Engelkes' last with the club. During his final season, Engelkes managed Ajax to the Double as they finished as champions in both the Eredivisie and the KNVB Cup.

=== VVOG ===
On 18 March 2014, it was announced that Engelkes was appointed manager of Hoofdklasse club VVOG starting from the 2014–15 season. On 10 April 2015, his contract was extended for one year, following satisfactory results. During the 2015–16 season, VVOG were promoted to the Derde Divisie. On 7 February 2017, Engelkes announced he would leave the club after the 2016–17 season.

== Honours ==
AZ Women

- Women's Eredivisie: 2007–08, 2008–09, 2009–10
- KNVB Women's Cup: 2010–11

Ajax Women

- Women's Eredivisie: 2016–17
- KNVB Women's Cup: 2013–14, 2016–17
