= Rotterdam derby =

Football rivalry in the Netherlands

- Location: Rotterdam
- Teams: Feyenoord; Sparta Rotterdam; Excelsior
- Latest meeting: 21 November 2026; Eredivisie; Feyenoord 2–3 Excelsior

The term Rotterdam derby (Dutch: Rotterdamse derby) refers to the local derbies in Rotterdam played between two of the three professional football clubs Feyenoord, Sparta Rotterdam or Excelsior. It specifically refers to individual matches between the clubs, but can also be used to describe the general ongoing rivalry between the clubs, players and/or fans.

Rotterdam is the only city in the Netherlands hosting three professional football clubs. The only other Dutch city to host more than one professional football club is Eindhoven, home of PSV and FC Eindhoven. However, the two Eindhoven clubs hardly play head-to-head due to FC Eindhoven's common lower division-status.

== Clubs in Rotterdam ==
=== Background ===
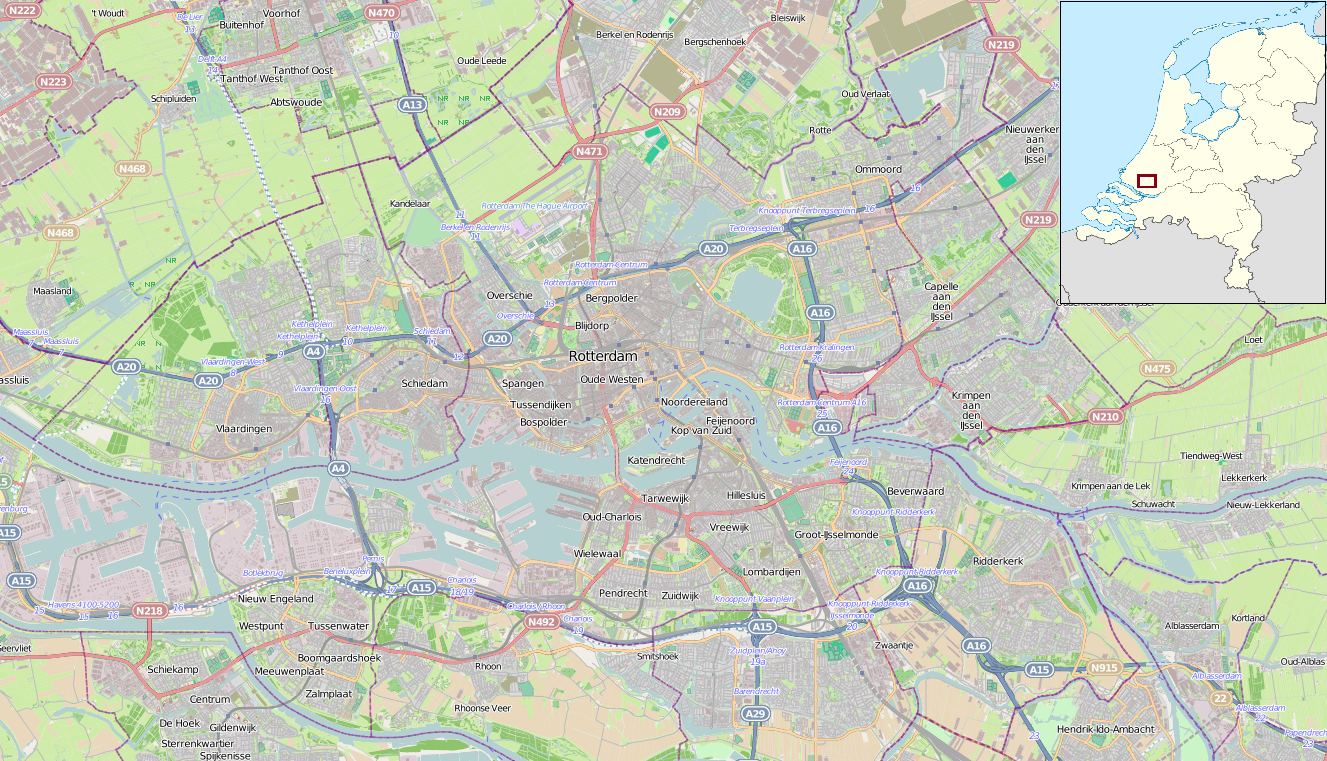
Locations of the three clubs in Rotterdam, Netherlands.

The three professional football clubs located in Rotterdam are Feyenoord, Sparta Rotterdam and Excelsior. As of the 2025-26 season, all three sides are playing in the Eredivisie.

Feyenoord is the most renowned club of Rotterdam. The club is located in the Feijenoord district of southern Rotterdam. Together with Ajax and PSV, Feyenoord is part of the traditional big three clubs in the Netherlands. Sparta Rotterdam – founded in 1888 – is the oldest professional football club in the Netherlands. The club is located in Spangen, a neighborhood in the Delfshaven district in west Rotterdam. Excelsior was founded as one of the first Dutch working-class clubs in the Kralingen district in eastern Rotterdam.

=== Honours ===
In total, 22 Eredivisie titles were won by clubs from Rotterdam. Feyenoord collected 16 Eredivisie trophies, while Sparta Rotterdam won the league six times. Former Rotterdam amateur club VV Concordia won the league once in the season 1888–1889, which was the first season of the highest football league in the Netherlands. Where Feyenoord and Sparta Rotterdam were successful on the highest level, Excelsior only won trophies on the second tier of Dutch football.
Feyenoord have competed in all 57 seasons of the Eredivisie amassing the 3rd most points of any club after Ajax and PSV. Sparta have competed in 52 seasons and are ranked 5th overall. Excelsior have competed in 17 seasons and are ranked 28th overall.

National honours
| Competition | Feyenoord | Sparta | Excelsior |
|---|---|---|---|
| Eredivisie | 16 | 6 | 0 |
| KNVB Cup | 14 | 3 | 0 |
| Johan Cruijff Shield | 5 | 0 | 0 |
| Total | 35 | 9 | 0 |

== Feyenoord vs Sparta Rotterdam derby ==
The main rivalry in Rotterdam is between its two most successful clubs; Feyenoord and Sparta Rotterdam. The derby between both clubs is still seen as a match with a lot of tradition, but the rivalry is not as ferocious as it used to be. The rivalry between the two clubs is mainly based on the historical class difference. When Sparta Rotterdam was founded in 1888, football in the Netherlands was an upper class sport only. Feyenoord, on the other hand, was founded twenty years later, in the center of the working class district Feijenoord. The difference in culture and background caused a lot of friction between the two sides.

The first derby match between Feyenoord and Sparta was a friendly match on 22 May 1921. Since Feyenoord's establishment in 1908, the club was working its way up the Dutch football system steadily. In 1921, Feyenoord promoted to the highest football league in the Netherlands for the first time in its existence, while Sparta just relegated to the lower league. As an official league match was not possible, a friendly match had to be played to decide who really was the best club of Rotterdam. Feyenoord won the match in the Sparta stadium with a 2–4 score, which was the first time Sparta's superiority in Rotterdam was broken. In the season 1922–23, the first official Rotterdam derby between Feyenoord and Sparta was played. Sparta, the most successful Rotterdam club at the time, took its revenge over the friendly loss in the previous season and managed to defeat Feyenoord twice with a 1–0 score.

Following Sparta Rotterdam's relegation from the top flight after the season 2009–10, a Rotterdam derby between both clubs in the league disappeared for a few years. The last competitive meeting between the two clubs was in April 2010, with Feyenoord winning the Eredivisie match with a 3–0 score at De Kuip. However, following the promotion of Sparta in 2016, the derby returned to the program.

Feyenoord vs Sparta Rotterdam statistics
| Competition | Total | Feyenoord wins | Draws | Sparta wins | Feyenoord goals | Sparta goals |
|---|---|---|---|---|---|---|
| Eredivisie | 121 | 74 | 27 | 20 | 285 | 132 |
| KNVB Cup | 4 | 1 | 2 | 1 | 7 | 4 |
| Total | 125 | 75 | 29 | 21 | 292 | 136 |

As of 9 August 2026

== Sparta Rotterdam vs Excelsior derby ==
Such derby involves the two Rotterdam clubs who are currently behind Feyenoord in terms of awards and recent successes. Excelsior is based in Kralingen-Crooswijk (formerly a city of its own), in the eastern part of the city, whereas Sparta hails from Spangen, far closer to the city centre, and they are separated by their respective histories, with Sparta being far more successful in the past, whereas Excelsior being perceived as a newer, less successful side. Such rivalry is therefore not considered a heated one.

In June 2010, a Sparta-Excelsior two-legged derby occurred as a final the so-called nacompetitie, the promotion/relegation playoff tournament involving clubs from Eredivisie and Eerste Divisie. Despite Sparta coming from Eredivisie and considered obvious favourites, and Excelsior being instead merely third-placed in the Eerste Divisie with a team mostly composed by Feyenoord loanees, it was Excelsior who won the two-legged game on away goals rule, after scoring a late equaliser in the final minutes of the return game at Sparta's home, Het Kasteel, and thus replacing their crosstown opponents in the Dutch top flight.

Sparta Rotterdam vs Excelsior statistics
| Competition | Sparta wins | Draws | Excelsior wins | Total |
|---|---|---|---|---|
| Eredivisie | 19 | 6 | 14 | 39 |
| Eerste Divisie | 2 | 3 | 3 | 8 |
| KNVB Cup | 6 | 1 | 1 | 8 |
| Total | 27 | 10 | 18 | 55 |

Accurate as of 29 August 2026

== Feyenoord vs Excelsior derby ==
Both clubs have the same working-class background and have a long-term partnership since 1979, which was contractually sealed in 1996. Excelsior became Feyenoord's feeder club and provided experience and training for young talented Feyenoord players. In 2009, Feyenoord and Excelsior agreed on an even more extensive partnership. As part of the new agreement, the clubs started a joint regional youth academy called Feyenoord Academy and merged the club's reserve teams. Also, Excelsior continued to be Feyenoord's feeder club.

Since the partnership between both clubs, the Excelsior fans and players developed a more heated rivalry with Feyenoord, but one not reciprocated by Feyenoord. A majority of the Excelsior fans have always been against a partnership with Feyenoord. Michel van der Neut, chairman of Excelsior's supporters club, claimed: "Excelsior sold her soul with the extended partnership. Excelsior simply stops existing this way." The players on the other hand state to be extra motivated in the Rotterdam derbies versus Feyenoord.

With Excelsior's Eredivisie promotion in the season 2010–11, the Rotterdam derbies between both clubs were on the fixture again. Excelsior beat Feyenoord in the first derby of the season with a 3–2 score at Stadion Woudestein. Feyenoord won the return match, as well as both fixtures in the season 2011–12. Excelsior was relegated again after this season. It managed to return to the Eredivisie two seasons later. In 2017 Excelsior won the derby with a 3–0 score, resulting in riots in the city centre.

Feyenoord vs Excelsior statistics
| Competition | Feyenoord wins | Draws | Excelsior wins | Total |
|---|---|---|---|---|
| Eredivisie | 32 | 1 | 6 | 39 |
| KNVB Cup | 0 | 1 | 1 | 2 |
| Total | 32 | 2 | 7 | 41 |

As of 21 November 2026

== See also ==
- De Klassieker
- Amsterdam derby
- Twentse Derby
