= Eternal derby =

A number of football rivalries, especially in Eastern Europe and the Balkans, are referred to as Eternal derbies, oftentimes rivalries between football clubs that have never been relegated from their current national top-level league in their nation for a long time:

- Eternal derby (Albania), between KF Tirana and FK Partizani Tirana
- Sarajevo derby, between FK Željezničar Sarajevo and FK Sarajevo
- Eternal derby of Bulgarian football, between PFC Levski Sofia and PFC CSKA Sofia
- Jing–Hu rivalry, between Beijing Guoan F.C. and Shanghai Shenhua F.C.
- Eternal derby (Croatia), between GNK Dinamo Zagreb and HNK Hajduk Split
- Nicosia derby, between APOEL FC and AC Omonia
- Derby of the Eternal Enemies, between Olympiacos F.C. and Panathinaikos F.C.
- Örökrangadó, between Ferencvárosi TC and MTK Budapest FC
- Montenegrin Derby, between FK Sutjeska Nikšić and FK Budućnost Podgorica
- Eternal derby (North Macedonia), between FK Vardar and FK Pelister
- Derby de Lisboa, between SL Benfica and Sporting CP
- Eternal derby (Romania), between FC Steaua București and FC Dinamo București
- Eternal derby (Serbia), between Red Star Belgrade and FK Partizan
- Eternal derby (Slovenia), between NK Maribor and NK Olimpija Ljubljana
- The Intercontinental Derby (football), between Galatasaray S.K. and Fenerbahçe S.K.
