= SV Nieuw Sloten =

Dutch football club

Coordinates: 50°20′8″N 4°48′14″E

- Full name: Sportvereniging Nieuw Sloten
- Founded: 4 April 2004; 22 years ago
- Ground: Sportpark Sloten, Amsterdam, Netherlands
- Chairman: Frans Mobron
- League: Vierde Klasse Saturday (2020–21)
- Website: nieuw-sloten.nl
Home colours

SV Nieuw Sloten is a Dutch amateur football (soccer) club from the Nieuw Sloten neighborhood in Amsterdam founded in 2004. The club have a Sunday team competing in the Vijfde Klasse.

== History ==
Founded on 4 April 2004, SV Nieuw Sloten is most known for an incident in December 2012 involving the death of Richard Nieuwenhuizen, a linesman from the opposing SC Buitenboys B3 team from Almere, as a result of physical assault by six B1 youth players of Nieuw Sloten and one of their fathers after the match. A couple of hours later, he was not feeling well and was taken to the hospital, where he died due to his injuries. Following the incident, the Royal Dutch Football Association cancelled all amateur matches for 8 and 9 December. A moment of silence was kept during all professional football matches as well as at the FIFA Club World Cup in Japan. SV Nieuw Sloten suspended all further activities for the remainder of the season following the incident. The players and the father were convicted of manslaughter, and the disciplinary committee of the Royal Dutch Football Association banned five players from football for life, and suspended one player who showed obvious remorse for a period of 60 months.
