= ASV Blauw-Wit =

Dutch football club

Coordinates: 50°20′8″N 4°48′14″E

ASV Blauw Wit
- Full name: Amsterdamse Sportvereniging Blauw-Wit
- Founded: 10 May 1902; 124 years ago
- Ground: Sportpark Sloten, Amsterdam, Netherlands
- Website: www.asvblauwwit.nl
Home colours

Amsterdamse Sportvereniging Blauw-Wit (ASV Blauw-Wit) is an association football club from Amsterdam.

== History ==
=== Blauw-Wit Amsterdam ===
Blauw-Wit Amsterdam was founded on 10 May 1902 as a club for the Kinkerbuurt in Amsterdam. From 1928 it played home matches in the Olympic Stadium of Amsterdam. The club entered professional football in 1954. In 1972 the club professional division merged with Volewijckers and DWS to form FC Amsterdam. The Blauw-Wit organization continued as an amateur club. Originally named VICTORIA! the club merged with another neighborhood club Holland from which point the combined clubs took on the name Blauw-Wit and were accepted into the Derde Klasse by the NVB.

Between 1914 until 1928 Blauw-Wit played in the Old Stadion, before moving to the Olympic Stadium. The club championed the Eerste Klasse KNVB West I seven times (then the highest class in Dutch football). The club joined the professional football league Eredivisie from its inception in 1954. The professional division merged with Volewijckers and DWS to form FC Amsterdam in 1972.

The remaining amateur club fused in 2002 with Osdorp-Sport to form ASV Blauw-Wit Osdorp and then in 2003 with KBV, Neerlandia/SLTO and Sparta Amsterdam to become FC Blauw-Wit Amsterdam.

=== Blauw-Wit Beursbengels ===
Final logo of De Beursbengels

In 2015 FC Blauw-Wit merged with VV De Beursbengels to form Blauw-Wit Beursbengels. Its Saturday first squad played mostly in the Derde Klasse and two seasons in the Tweede Klasse. The Sunday first squad played in the Vijfde Klasse.

De Beursbengels was founded as an event team to celebrate the anniversary of the stock exchange in 1964. Employees and coworkers of the stock exchange played in a friendly match against Oud-Amsterdam. The match went so well that on 30 March 1965 VV de Beursbengels was founded. The club started competing in amateur football with three teams, in which the club's first team was promoted from the Derde Klasse of the Amsterdam football union up to the Vierde Klasse in Dutch amateur football. Fielding only three teams, it was one of the smallest football clubs in the Netherlands. Several promotions and relegations later the club managed to solidify itself as the smallest club ever to compete in the Hoofdklasse; in 2002 the club was relegated once more to the Eerste Klasse and in 2014–15 competed in the Tweede Klasse.

=== ASV Blauw-Wit ===
On 1 July 2021, the club changed its name to ASV Blauw Wit.
