= Twentse derby =

Dutch football derby

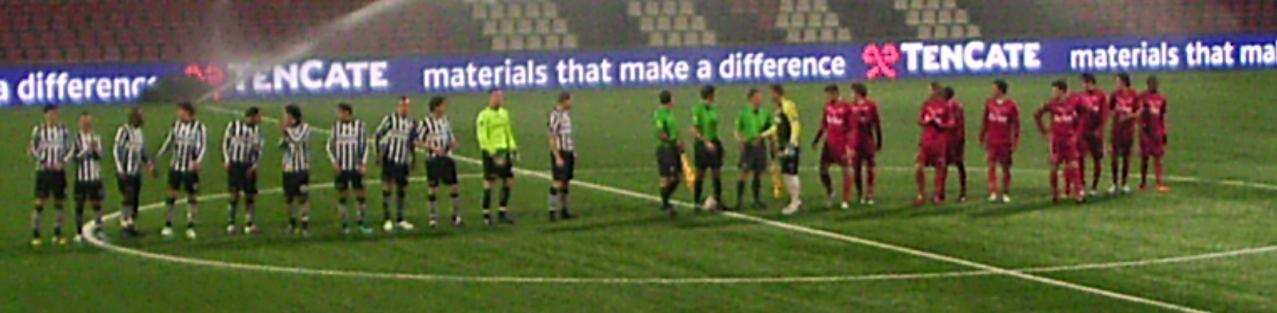
- Teams of FC Twente and Heracles before a match.
- Location: Twente
- Teams: FC Twente; Heracles Almelo
- First meeting: Heracles 3–2 SC Enschede (21 October 1962); 1962–63 Eredivisie
- Latest meeting: FC Twente 1-0 Heracles (5 November 2021); 2020–21 Eredivisie
- Next meeting: Heracles v FC Twente (28 February 2021); 2020–21 Eredivisie
- Stadiums: De Grolsch Veste (FC Twente); Asito Stadion (Heracles)

Statistics
- Total meetings: 37
- Most wins: FC Twente (21)
- Top scorer: Blaise Nkufo (5 goals)
- Largest victory: FC Twente 5–0 Heracles (19 January 2011); 2010–11 Eredivisie

The Twentse derby is a Dutch football derby between FC Twente and Heracles Almelo.

== Statistics ==
Competition	Played	FC Twente wins	Draws	Heracles wins	FC Twente goals	Heracles goals
Eredivisie	37	21	8	8	70	38

=== Results ===
FC Twente win Draw Heracles win

Season	Competition	Date	Home team	Result	Away team
1962–63	Eredivisie	21 October 1962	Heracles	3–2	Sportclub Enschede
1962–63	Eredivisie	12 May 1963	Sportclub Enschede	0–0	Heracles
1963–64	Eredivisie	1 December 1963	Sportclub Enschede	3–1	Heracles
1963–64	Eredivisie	3 May 1964	Heracles	2–2	Sportclub Enschede
1964–65	Eredivisie	22 November 1964	Heracles	1–2	Sportclub Enschede
1964–65	Eredivisie	11 April 1965	Sportclub Enschede	1–0	Heracles
1965–66	Eredivisie	5 September 1965	FC Twente	4–1	Heracles
1965–66	Eredivisie	6 March 1966	Heracles	2–0	FC Twente
1985–86	Eredivisie	22 September 1985	Heracles	0–3	FC Twente
1985–86	Eredivisie	25 March 1986	FC Twente	0–0	Heracles
2005–06	Eredivisie	2 October 2005	FC Twente	4–0	Heracles
2005–06	Eredivisie	5 March 2006	Heracles	2–0	FC Twente
2006–07	Eredivisie	20 August 2006	Heracles	3–0	FC Twente
2006–07	Eredivisie	8 April 2007	FC Twente	1–1	Heracles
2007–08	Eredivisie	4 November 2007	Heracles	0–3	FC Twente
2007–08	Eredivisie	8 February 2008	FC Twente	2–1	Heracles
2008–09	Eredivisie	18 October 2008	FC Twente	2–0	Heracles
2008–09	Eredivisie	25 January 2009	Heracles	1–2	FC Twente
2009–10	Eredivisie	4 October 2009	Heracles	1–3	FC Twente
2009–10	Eredivisie	3 February 2010	FC Twente	2–0	Heracles
2010–11	Eredivisie	19 September 2010	Heracles	0–0	FC Twente
2010–11	Eredivisie	19 January 2011	FC Twente	5–0	Heracles
2011–12	Eredivisie	19 November 2011	Heracles	1–1	FC Twente
2011–12	Eredivisie	10 February 2012	FC Twente	2–3	Heracles
2012–13	Eredivisie	14 December 2012	FC Twente	3–2	Heracles
2012–13	Eredivisie	5 May 2013	Heracles	1–1	FC Twente
2013–14	Eredivisie	21 September 2013	Heracles	0–3	FC Twente
2013–14	Eredivisie	17 January 2014	FC Twente	3–1	Heracles
2014–15	Eredivisie	21 September 2014	Heracles	1–4	FC Twente
2014–15	Eredivisie	23 January 2015	FC Twente	2–0	Heracles
2015–16	Eredivisie	29 August 2015	Heracles	2–0	FC Twente
2015–16	Eredivisie	15 January 2016	FC Twente	4–0	Heracles
2016–17	Eredivisie	2 October 2016	Heracles	1–1	FC Twente
2016–17	Eredivisie	20 January 2017	FC Twente	1–0	Heracles
2017–18	Eredivisie	29 September 2017	FC Twente	2–1	Heracles
2017–18	Eredivisie	9 March 2018	Heracles	2–1	FC Twente
2019–20	Eredivisie	20 September 2019	FC Twente	2–3	Heracles

=== All time goal scorers ===
Nation	Player	Club(s)	League	Years
(Switzerland)	Blaise Nkufo	FC Twente	5	2003–2010
(Austria)	Marc Janko	FC Twente	4	2010–2012
(Netherlands)	Luc Castaignos	FC Twente	4	2012–2015
(Netherlands)	John ter Mors	Heracles	3	1985–1986
(Brazil)	Everton	Heracles	3	2006–2013
(Netherlands)	Luuk de Jong	FC Twente	3	2009–2012
