= 2016–17 Eredivisie =

61st season of the Eredivisie

Eredivisie
- Season: 2016–17
- Dates: 5 August 2016 – 7 May 2017
- Champions: Feyenoord (15th title)
- Relegated: NEC; Go Ahead Eagles
- Champions League: Feyenoord; Ajax
- Europa League: PSV; Vitesse; FC Utrecht
- Matches: 306
- Goals: 884 (2.89 per match)
- Top goalscorer: Nicolai Jørgensen (21 goals)
- Biggest home win: Feyenoord 8–0 Go Ahead Eagles (5 April 2017)
- Biggest away win: Groningen 0–5 Feyenoord (7 August 2016)
- Highest scoring: Feyenoord 8–0 Go Ahead Eagles (5 April 2017); Twente 3–5 Groningen (15 May 2017)
- Longest winning run: 10 matches Feyenoord
- Longest unbeaten run: 17 matches PSV
- Longest winless run: 12 matches Excelsior
- Longest losing run: 7 matches NEC
- Highest attendance: 51,998; Ajax 1–1 PSV (18 December 2016)
- Lowest attendance: 3,200; Excelsior 2–0 Groningen (13 August 2016)
- Total attendance: 5,841,335
- Average attendance: 19,089

The 2016–17 Eredivisie season was the 61st season of the top-tier Dutch League Eredivisie since its establishment in 1956. The fixtures for this season were announced on 14 June 2016. PSV were the defending champions after winning the title for a record 23rd time.

At the end of the season, Feyenoord became the title-holders for a record 15th time and the first since the 1998–99 season.

== Teams ==
A total of 18 teams took part in the league: The best fifteen teams from the 2015–16 season, two promotion/relegation playoff winners and the 2015–16 Eerste Divisie champions.

Sparta Rotterdam, the champion of the 2015–16 Eerste Divisie, returned to the Eredivisie after spending six seasons in the Eerste Divisie, whereas play-off winner Go Ahead Eagles returned to the Eredivisie after just one season. They replaced relegated teams Cambuur and De Graafschap.

As a result of financial maladministration, the KNVB had originally taken FC Twente's license, causing them to relegate to the 2016-17 Eerste Divisie. However, FC Twente successfully appealed this decision and was therefore allowed to stay in the league.

Location of teams in Eredivisie 2016–17
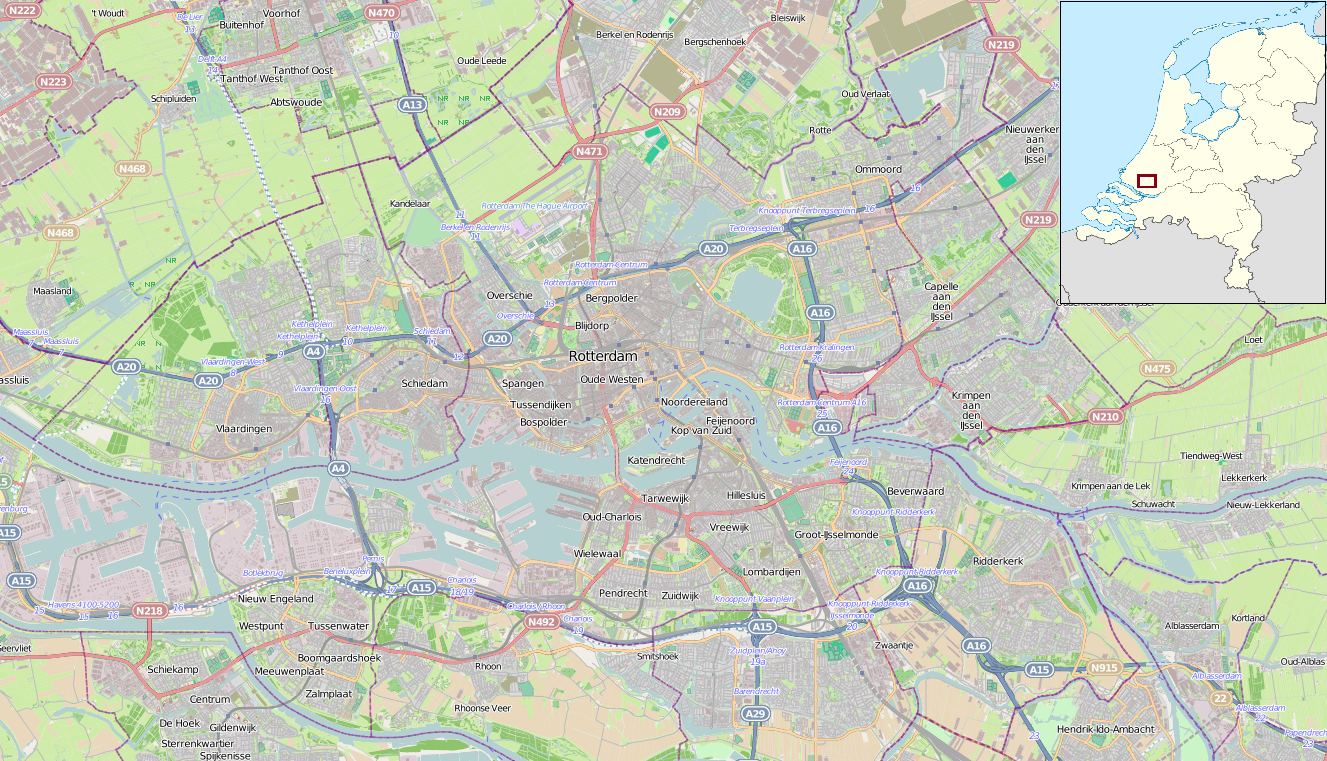
Rotterdam Eredivisie football clubs

Club	Location	Venue	Capacity
ADO Den Haag	The Hague	Kyocera Stadion	15,000
Ajax	Amsterdam	Amsterdam ArenA	53,490
AZ	Alkmaar	AFAS Stadion	17,023
Excelsior	Rotterdam	Stadion Woudestein	4,400
Feyenoord	Rotterdam	De Kuip	51,177
Go Ahead Eagles	Deventer	Adelaarshorst	10,400
Groningen	Groningen	Noordlease Stadion	22,550
Heerenveen	Heerenveen	Abe Lenstra Stadion	26,100
Heracles Almelo	Almelo	Polman Stadion	13,500
NEC	Nijmegen	Stadion de Goffert	12,500
PEC Zwolle	Zwolle	MAC³PARK Stadion	13,250
PSV	Eindhoven	Philips Stadion	36,500
Roda JC	Kerkrade	Parkstad Limburg Stadion	19,979
Sparta Rotterdam	Rotterdam	Het Kasteel	11,026
Twente	Enschede	De Grolsch Veste	30,205
Utrecht	Utrecht	Stadion Galgenwaard	23,750
Vitesse	Arnhem	GelreDome	25,500
Willem II	Tilburg	Koning Willem II Stadion	14,500

=== Personnel and kits ===
Note: Flags indicate national team as has been defined under FIFA eligibility rules. Players and managers may hold more than one non-FIFA nationality.

Team	Manager	Kit manufacturer	Shirt sponsor
ADO Den Haag	(Netherlands) Alfons Groenendijk	Erreà	Basic-Fit Fitness
Ajax	(Netherlands) Peter Bosz	Adidas	Ziggo
AZ	(Netherlands) John van den Brom	Under Armour	AFAS Software
Excelsior	(Netherlands) Mitchell van der Gaag	Quick	DSW Zorgverzekeraar
Feyenoord	(Netherlands) Giovanni van Bronckhorst	Adidas	Opel
Go Ahead Eagles	(Netherlands) Robert Maaskant	Hummel	Drukwerkdeal.nl
Groningen	(Netherlands) Ernest Faber	Robey	Essent
Heerenveen	(Netherlands) Jurgen Streppel	Jako	GroenLeven
Heracles	(Netherlands) John Stegeman	Acerbis	Asito
NEC	(Netherlands) Ron de Groot	Patrick	EnergieFlex
PEC Zwolle	(Netherlands) Ron Jans	Robey	Molecaten
PSV	(Netherlands) Phillip Cocu	Umbro	Energiedirect.nl
Roda JC	(Greece) Giannis Anastasiou	Robey	KLG Europe
Sparta Rotterdam	(Netherlands) Alex Pastoor	Robey	Axidus
Twente	(Netherlands) René Hake	Sondico	Pure Energie
Utrecht	(Netherlands) Erik ten Hag	Hummel	Zorg van de zaak
Vitesse	(Netherlands) Henk Fraser	Macron	Truphone
Willem II	(Netherlands) Erwin van de Looi	Robey	Tricorp

=== Managerial changes ===
Team	Outgoing manager	Manner of departure	Date of vacancy	Position in table	Replaced by	Date of appointment
Groningen	(Netherlands) Erwin van de Looi	End of contract	1 July 2016	Pre-season	(Netherlands) Ernest Faber	1 July 2016
NEC	(Netherlands) Ernest Faber	Signed by Groningen	1 July 2016	Pre-season	(Germany) Peter Hyballa	1 July 2016
Heerenveen	(Netherlands) Foppe de Haan	End of contract	1 July 2016	Pre-season	(Netherlands) Jurgen Streppel	1 July 2016
Willem II	(Netherlands) Jurgen Streppel	Signed by Heerenveen	1 July 2016	Pre-season	(Netherlands) Erwin van de Looi	1 July 2016
Vitesse	(Netherlands) Rob Maas	Resigned	1 July 2016	Pre-season	(Netherlands) Henk Fraser	1 July 2016
Roda JC	(Bosnia and Herzegovina) Darije Kalezić	Sacked	1 July 2016	Pre-season	(Greece) Giannis Anastasiou	1 July 2016
Ajax	(Netherlands) Frank de Boer	Resigned	1 July 2016	Pre-season	(Netherlands) Peter Bosz	1 July 2016
Excelsior	(Netherlands) Alfons Groenendijk	Mutual consent	1 July 2016	Pre-season	(Netherlands) Mitchell van der Gaag	1 July 2016
ADO Den Haag	(Netherlands) Henk Fraser	Signed by Vitesse	1 July 2016	Pre-season	(Montenegro) Željko Petrović	1 July 2016
ADO Den Haag	(Montenegro) Željko Petrović	Mutual consent	7 February 2017	16th	(Netherlands) Alfons Groenendijk	8 February 2017
Go Ahead Eagles	(Netherlands) Hans de Koning	Sacked	22 March 2017	18th	(Netherlands) Robert Maaskant	25 March 2017
NEC	(Germany) Peter Hyballa	Sacked	24 April 2017	17th	(Netherlands) Ron de Groot	25 April 2017
Roda JC	(Greece) Giannis Anastasiou	Sacked	23 May 2017	17th	(Netherlands) Huub Stevens	23 May 2017

== Standings ==
Pos	Team	Pld	W	D	L	GF	GA	GD	Pts	Qualification or relegation
1	Feyenoord (C)	34	26	4	4	86	25	+61	82	Qualification for the Champions League group stage
2	Ajax	34	25	6	3	79	23	+56	81	Qualification for the Champions League third qualifying round
3	PSV Eindhoven	34	22	10	2	68	23	+45	76	Qualification for the Europa League third qualifying round
4	Utrecht (O)	34	18	8	8	54	38	+16	62	Qualification for the European competition play-offs (Note: Four teams played for a spot in the Europa League second qualifying round.)
5	Vitesse	34	15	6	13	51	40	+11	51	Qualification for the Europa League group stage (Note: Vitesse qualified for the Europa League group stage by winning the 2016–17 KNVB Cup.)
6	AZ	34	12	13	9	56	52	+4	49	Qualification for the European competition play-offs
7	Twente (Note: Twente was excluded from European football for 3 years on 15 December 2015.)	34	12	9	13	48	50	−2	45	
8	Groningen	34	10	13	11	55	51	+4	43	Qualification for the European competition play-offs
9	Heerenveen	34	12	7	15	54	53	+1	43	Qualification for the European competition play-offs
10	Heracles Almelo	34	12	7	15	53	55	−2	43	
11	ADO Den Haag	34	11	5	18	37	59	−22	38	
12	Excelsior	34	9	10	15	43	60	−17	37	
13	Willem II	34	9	9	16	29	44	−15	36	
14	PEC Zwolle	34	9	8	17	39	67	−28	35	
15	Sparta Rotterdam	34	9	7	18	42	61	−19	34	
16	NEC (R)	34	9	7	18	32	59	−27	34	Qualification for the Relegation play-offs
17	Roda JC Kerkrade (O)	34	7	12	15	26	51	−25	33	Qualification for the Relegation play-offs
18	Go Ahead Eagles (R)	34	6	5	23	32	73	−41	23	Relegation to Eerste Divisie

Source: NUsport (in Dutch), Soccerway
Rules for classification: 1) Points; 2) Goal difference; 3) Goals scored; 4) Play-off (only for deciding champion and relegation); 5) Head-to-head points; 6) Head-to-head goal difference; 7) Head-to-head away goals scored; 8) Draw. (Note: Criteria 5-8 is only used if deciding Europa League play-off places)
(C) Champions; (O) Play-off winners; (R) Relegated

== Results ==
Home \ Away	ADO	AJX	AZ	EXC	FEY	GAE	GRO	HRV	HRC	NEC	PEC	PSV	RJC	SPA	TWE	UTR	VIT	WIL
ADO Den Haag		0–2	0–1	4–1	0–1	3–0	4–3	0–3	1–1	1–0	1–2	1–1	4–1	1–0	1–1	0–2	0–2	1–0
Ajax	3–0		4–1	1–0	2–1	4–0	2–0	5–1	4–1	5–0	5–1	1–1	2–2	2–0	3–0	3–2	1–0	1–2
AZ	4–0	2–2		1–1	0–4	2–2	0–0	2–2	5–1	2–0	1–1	2–4	1–1	1–1	2–1	2–3	2–2	2–0
Excelsior	1–2	1–1	3–3		3–0	1–1	2–0	4–1	3–1	2–2	0–2	1–3	0–1	3–2	1–1	1–3	1–0	0–2
Feyenoord	3–1	1–1	5–2	4–1		8–0	2–0	2–2	3–1	4–0	3–0	2–1	5–0	6–1	2–0	2–0	3–1	1–0
Go Ahead Eagles	3–1	0–3	1–3	3–0	1–0		2–3	1–3	1–4	2–2	1–3	1–3	2–0	1–3	0–2	0–1	1–3	0–1
Groningen	2–1	1–1	2–0	1–1	0–5	1–1		0–3	0–0	2–0	5–1	1–1	2–0	1–1	3–4	2–3	1–1	1–1
Heerenveen	2–0	0–1	1–2	2–1	1–2	2–2	0–0		3–1	0–2	1–0	1–1	3–0	3–0	3–1	2–2	1–1	1–0
Heracles Almelo	4–0	0–2	1–2	4–0	0–1	2–1	1–4	4–1		2–0	3–0	1–2	2–2	2–2	1–1	2–1	0–1	3–1
NEC	3–0	1–5	2–1	0–1	1–2	1–2	1–1	2–1	3–1		1–1	0–4	2–0	0–1	3–2	0–3	1–1	0–0
PEC Zwolle	2–1	1–3	0–2	1–1	2–2	3–1	0–4	2–1	1–2	2–0		0–4	0–0	0–3	1–2	1–1	3–1	0–0
PSV Eindhoven	3–1	1–0	1–0	2–0	0–1	1–0	0–0	4–3	1–1	3–1	4–1		4–0	1–0	1–1	3–0	1–0	5–0
Roda JC Kerkrade	1–1	0–2	1–1	4–0	0–2	1–0	3–1	0–3	1–1	0–1	2–1	0–0		3–1	0–3	0–0	0–1	1–0
Sparta Rotterdam	0–1	1–3	1–1	2–3	1–0	1–0	2–2	3–1	3–1	2–0	2–3	0–2	2–2		1–0	1–2	0–1	2–2
Twente	4–1	1–0	1–2	1–2	0–2	1–2	3–5	1–0	1–0	3–0	2–2	2–2	0–0	3–1		1–1	2–1	2–1
Utrecht	1–1	0–1	1–2	2–1	3–3	3–0	1–5	1–0	2–0	1–1	3–1	1–2	1–0	2–0	3–0		1–0	2–0
Vitesse	1–2	0–1	2–1	2–2	0–2	2–0	2–1	4–2	1–2	2–1	3–1	0–2	3–0	5–0	3–1	1–1		0–2
Willem II	1–2	1–3	1–1	1–1	0–2	2–0	2–1	2–1	1–3	0–1	2–0	0–0	0–0	3–2	0–0	0–1	1–4	

Source: Eredivisie (in Dutch)
Legend: Blue = home team win; Yellow = draw; Red = away team win.
For upcoming matches, an "a" indicates there is an article about the rivalry between the two participants.

== Season statistics ==
=== Top scorers ===
Rank	Player	Club	Goals
1	(Denmark) Nicolai Jørgensen	Feyenoord	21
2	(Iran) Reza Ghoochannejhad	Heerenveen	20
2	(Netherlands) Ricky van Wolfswinkel	Vitesse	20
4	(Sweden) Samuel Armenteros	Heracles	19
5	(Turkey) Enes Ünal	Twente	18
6	(Netherlands) Mimoun Mahi	Groningen	17
7	(Denmark) Kasper Dolberg	Ajax	16
8	(Netherlands) Davy Klaassen	Ajax	14
8	(Netherlands) Jens Toornstra	Feyenoord	14
10	(France) Sébastien Haller	Utrecht	13
10	(Netherlands) Wout Weghorst	AZ	13

=== Hat-tricks ===
Player	For	Against	Result	Date
(Netherlands) Eljero Elia	Feyenoord	Groningen	5–0	7 August 2016
(Turkey) Enes Ünal	Twente	Groningen	4–3	21 August 2016
(Denmark) Kasper Dolberg	Ajax	NEC	5–0	20 November 2016
(Iran) Reza Ghoochannejhad	Heerenveen	PSV	3–4	22 January 2017
(Denmark) Nicolai Jørgensen	Feyenoord	AZ	5–2	12 March 2017
(Netherlands) Jens Toornstra	Feyenoord	Go Ahead Eagles	8–0	5 April 2017
(Netherlands) Ricky van Wolfswinkel	Vitesse	Heerenveen	4–2	8 April 2017
(Netherlands) Dirk Kuyt	Feyenoord	Heracles	3–1	14 May 2017

=== Assists ===
Rank	Player	Club	Assists
1	(Morocco) Hakim Ziyech	Twente / Ajax	12
2	(Denmark) Nicolai Jørgensen	Feyenoord	11
2	(Sweden) Sam Larsson	Heerenveen	11
4	(Kosovo) Milot Rashica	Vitesse	10
4	(Mexico) Andrés Guardado	PSV	10
6	(Netherlands) Davy Klaassen	Ajax	9
6	(Netherlands) Jens Toornstra	Feyenoord	9

=== Clean sheets ===
Rank	Player	Club	Clean sheets
1	(Australia) Brad Jones	Feyenoord	17
2	(Cameroon) André Onana	Ajax	15
3	(Netherlands) Jeroen Zoet	PSV	14
4	(Denmark) David Jensen	Utrecht	10
4	(Greece) Kostas Lamprou	Willem II	10

=== Discipline ===
==== Player ====
- Most yellow cards: 10
  - Denzel Dumfries (Sparta)
  - Danny Holla (PEC Zwolle)
- Most red cards: 3
  - Juninho Bacuna (Groningen)

== Play-offs ==
=== European competition ===
Four teams played for a spot in the 2017–18 UEFA Europa League second qualifying round.

Semi-finals
Groningen	1	1	2
AZ	4	4	8
Heerenveen	1	1	2
Utrecht	3	2	5

Final
AZ	3	0	3
Utrecht (p)	0	3	3

Key: * = Play-off winners, (a) = Wins because of away goals rule, (e) = Wins after extra time in second leg, (p) = Wins after penalty shoot-out.

=== Promotion/relegation play-offs ===
Ten teams, two (NEC and Roda JC, as 16th- and 17th-placed teams) from the Eredivisie and eight from the Eerste Divisie, played for two spots in the 2017–18 Eredivisie, the remaining eight teams play in the 2017–18 Eerste Divisie.

First round
Helmond Sport	4	2	6
Almere City	2	0	2
RKC	1	1	2
Emmen	5	0	5

Second round
MVV	1	2	3
Cambuur	1	1	2
Helmond Sport	0	1	1
Roda JC	1	1	2
Volendam	2	0	2
NAC	2	2	4
Emmen	1	0	1
NEC	3	1	4

Third round
MVV	0	0	0
Roda JC	0	1	1
NAC	1	4	5
NEC	0	1	1

Key: * = Play-off winners, (a) = Wins because of away goals rule, (e) = Wins after extra time in second leg, (p) = Wins after penalty shoot-out.

== Awards ==
=== Annual awards ===
Annual awards
Award	Winner	Club
Gouden Schoen	(Morocco) Karim El Ahmadi	Feyenoord
Johan Cruyff Prize – Talent of the Year	(Denmark) Kasper Dolberg	Ajax
Eredivisie Top Scorer	(Denmark) Nicolai Jørgensen	Feyenoord

Team of the Season
Goalkeeper	(Australia) Brad Jones (Feyenoord)			
Defenders	(Netherlands) Rick Karsdorp (Feyenoord)	(Brazil) Eric Botteghin (Feyenoord)	(Colombia) Davinson Sánchez (Ajax)	(Netherlands) Joël Veltman (Ajax)
Midfielders	(Denmark) Lasse Schöne (Ajax)	(Morocco) Karim El Ahmadi (Feyenoord)	(Netherlands) Jens Toornstra (Feyenoord)	(Netherlands) Davy Klaassen (Ajax)
Forwards	(Sweden) Sam Larsson (Heerenveen)		(Denmark) Nicolai Jørgensen (Feyenoord)	

== Attendances ==
Ajax drew the highest average home attendance in the 2016-17 edition of the Eredivisie.

#	Football club	Home games	Average attendance
1	AFC Ajax	17	49,551
2	Feyenoord	17	47,500
3	PSV	17	33,724
4	FC Twente	17	25,500
5	sc Heerenveen	17	22,109
6	FC Groningen	17	19,527
7	FC Utrecht	17	18,276
8	Vitesse	17	15,907
9	AZ	17	14,855
10	Roda JC	17	13,857
11	PEC Zwolle	17	12,855
12	Willem II	17	12,451
13	NEC	17	11,357
14	ADO Den Haag	17	11,343
15	Heracles Almelo	17	11,109
16	Sparta Rotterdam	17	10,249
17	Go Ahead Eagles	17	9,378
18	Excelsior	17	4,069
