= 2015–16 Eredivisie =

60th season of the Eredivisie

Eredivisie
- Season: 2015–16
- Dates: 8 August 2015 – 8 May 2016
- Champions: PSV (23rd title)
- Relegated: Cambuur; De Graafschap
- Champions League: PSV; Ajax
- Europa League: Feyenoord; AZ; Heracles
- Matches: 306
- Goals: 912 (2.98 per match)
- Top goalscorer: Vincent Janssen (27 goals)
- Biggest home win: Ajax 6–0 Roda JC (31 October 2015)
- Biggest away win: Cambuur 0–6 PSV (12 September 2015)
- Highest scoring: De Graafschap 3–6 PSV (31 October 2015); Heracles 3–6 AZ (13 February 2016)
- Longest winning run: 10 games PSV
- Longest unbeaten run: 21 games PSV
- Longest winless run: 15 games Cambuur
- Longest losing run: 7 games Cambuur; Feyenoord
- Highest attendance: 51,875; Ajax 2–1 Feyenoord (7 February 2016)
- Lowest attendance: 3,394; Excelsior 2–2 AZ (15 August 2015)
- Total attendance: 5,929,439
- Average attendance: 19,377

The 2015–16 Eredivisie season was the 60th season of the Eredivisie since its establishment in 1955. Defending champions PSV retained their title.

== Teams ==
A total of 18 teams took part in the league: the top 15 teams from the 2014–15 season, two promotion/relegation playoff winners and the 2014–15 Eerste Divisie champions.

NEC, the champion of the 2014–15 Eerste Divisie, and play-off winner Roda JC returned to the Eredivisie after just one season. De Graafschap, the other play-off winner, returned to the highest level for the first time since the 2011–12 season.

Location of teams in Eredivisie 2015–16
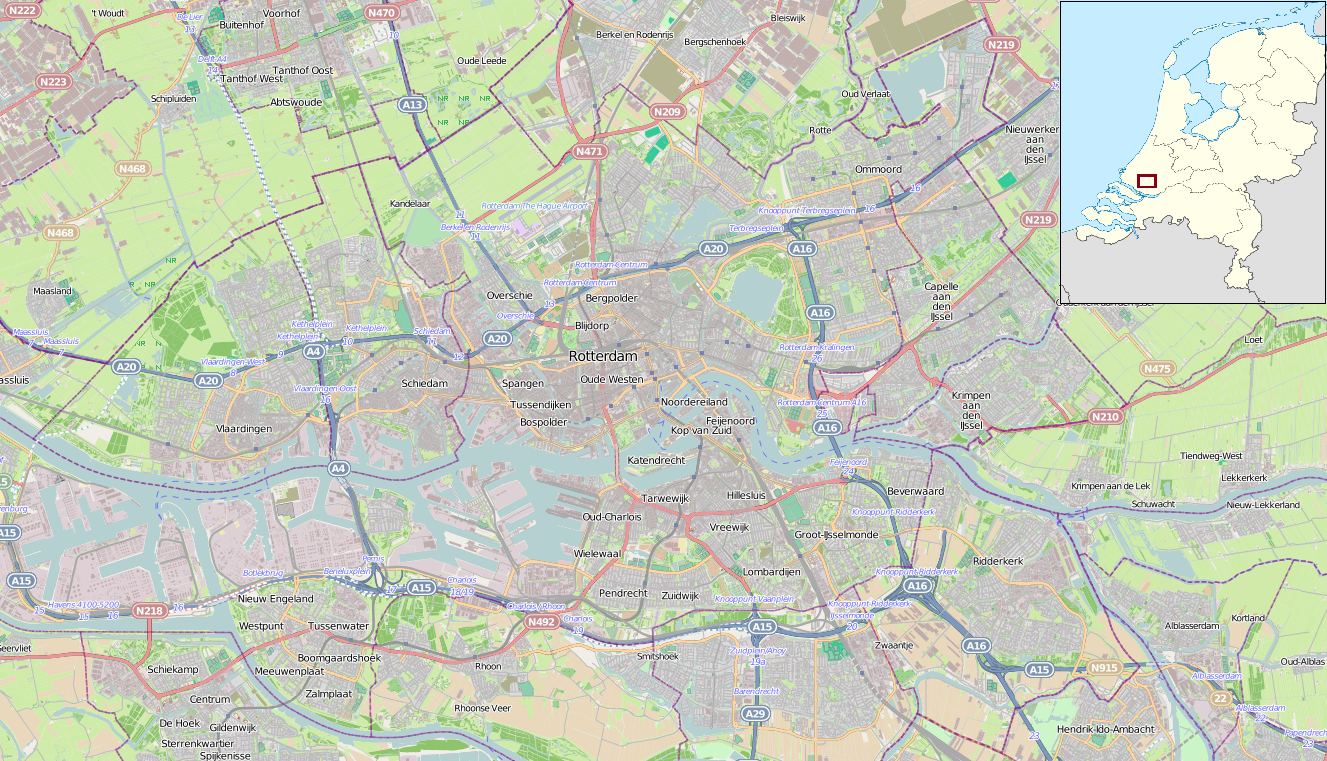
Rotterdam Eredivisie football clubs

Club	Location	Venue	Capacity
ADO Den Haag	The Hague	Kyocera Stadion	15,000
Ajax	Amsterdam	Amsterdam ArenA	53,490
AZ	Alkmaar	AFAS Stadion	17,023
Cambuur	Leeuwarden	Cambuur Stadion	10,500
De Graafschap	Doetinchem	De Vijverberg	12,600
Excelsior	Rotterdam	Stadion Woudestein	3,531
Feyenoord	Rotterdam	De Kuip	51,177
Groningen	Groningen	Euroborg	22,550
Heerenveen	Heerenveen	Abe Lenstra Stadion	26,100
Heracles	Almelo	Polman Stadion	13,500
NEC	Nijmegen	Stadion de Goffert	12,500
PEC Zwolle	Zwolle	IJsseldelta Stadion	12,500
PSV	Eindhoven	Philips Stadion	35,000
Roda JC	Kerkrade	Parkstad Limburg Stadion	19,979
Twente	Enschede	De Grolsch Veste	30,205
Utrecht	Utrecht	Stadion Galgenwaard	23,750
Vitesse	Arnhem	GelreDome	25,500
Willem II	Tilburg	Koning Willem II Stadion	14,500

=== Personnel and kits ===
Note: Flags indicate national team as has been defined under FIFA eligibility rules. Players and managers may hold more than one non-FIFA nationality.

Team	Manager	Kit manufacturer	Shirt sponsor
ADO Den Haag	(Netherlands) Henk Fraser	Erreà	Basic-Fit Fitness
Ajax	(Netherlands) Frank de Boer	Adidas	Ziggo
AZ	(Netherlands) John van den Brom	Under Armour	AFAS software
Cambuur	(Netherlands) Marcel Keizer	Quick	Bouwgroep Dijkstra Draisma
De Graafschap	(Netherlands) Jan Vreman	Quick	ATAG
Excelsior	(Netherlands) Alfons Groenendijk	Quick	DSW Zorgverzekeraar
Feyenoord	(Netherlands) Giovanni van Bronckhorst	Adidas	Opel
Groningen	(Netherlands) Erwin van de Looi	Robey	Essent
Heerenveen	(Netherlands) Foppe de Haan	Jako	Univé
Heracles	(Netherlands) John Stegeman	Acerbis	TenCate
NEC	(Netherlands) Ernest Faber	Patrick	Scholten Awater
PEC Zwolle	(Netherlands) Ron Jans	Robey	Molecaten
PSV	(Netherlands) Phillip Cocu	Umbro	Philips
Roda JC	(Bosnia and Herzegovina) Darije Kalezić	Robey	KLG
Twente	(Netherlands) René Hake	Nike	Webprint.nl
Utrecht	(Netherlands) Erik ten Hag	Hummel	Zorg van de Zaak
Vitesse	(Netherlands) Rob Maas	Macron	Truphone
Willem II	(Netherlands) Jurgen Streppel	Robey	Tricorp

=== Managerial changes ===
Team	Outgoing manager	Manner of departure	Date of vacancy	Position in table	Replaced by	Date of appointment
Utrecht	(Netherlands) Rob Alflen	End of contract	1 July 2015	Pre-season	(Netherlands) Erik ten Hag	1 July 2015
NEC	(Netherlands) Ruud Brood	Mutual consent	1 July 2015	Pre-season	(Netherlands) Ernest Faber	1 July 2015
Excelsior	(Netherlands) Marinus Dijkhuizen	Signed by Brentford	1 July 2015	Pre-season	(Netherlands) Alfons Groenendijk	1 July 2015
Roda JC	(Netherlands) Rick Plum	End of interim spell	1 July 2015	Pre-season	(Bosnia and Herzegovina) Darije Kalezić	1 July 2015
Twente	(Netherlands) Alfred Schreuder	Sacked	30 August 2015	16th	(Netherlands) René Hake	30 August 2015
Heerenveen	(Netherlands) Dwight Lodeweges	Resigned	20 October 2015	15th	(Netherlands) Foppe de Haan	20 October 2015
Vitesse	(Netherlands) Peter Bosz	Signed by Maccabi Tel Aviv	4 January 2016	5th	(Netherlands) Rob Maas	4 January 2016
Cambuur	(Netherlands) Henk de Jong	Resigned	9 February 2016	17th	(Netherlands) Marcel Keizer	13 February 2016

== Standings ==
Pos	Team	Pld	W	D	L	GF	GA	GD	Pts	Qualification or relegation
1	PSV Eindhoven (C)	34	26	6	2	88	32	+56	84	Qualification for the Champions League group stage
2	Ajax	34	25	7	2	81	21	+60	82	Qualification for the Champions League third qualifying round
3	Feyenoord	34	19	6	9	62	40	+22	63	Qualification for the Europa League group stage (Note: Feyenoord qualified for the Europa League group stage by winning the 2015–16 KNVB Cup.)
4	AZ	34	18	5	11	70	53	+17	59	Qualification for the Europa League third qualifying round
5	Utrecht	34	15	8	11	57	48	+9	53	Qualification for the European competition play-offs (Note: Four teams played for one spot in the UEFA Europa League third qualifying round.)
6	Heracles Almelo (O)	34	14	9	11	47	49	−2	51	Qualification for the European competition play-offs
7	Groningen	34	14	8	12	41	48	−7	50	Qualification for the European competition play-offs
8	PEC Zwolle	34	14	6	14	56	54	+2	48	Qualification for the European competition play-offs
9	Vitesse	34	12	10	12	55	38	+17	46	
10	NEC	34	13	7	14	37	42	−5	46	
11	ADO Den Haag	34	10	13	11	48	49	−1	43	
12	Heerenveen	34	11	9	14	46	61	−15	42	
13	Twente (Note: Twente were deducted three points for breaking the financial standards set by the Royal Dutch Football Association. In May 2016 Twente had their licence for the Eredivisie revoked by KNVB and was relegated to the Eerste Divisie, but they successfully appealed this decision and stayed in the league.)	34	12	7	15	49	64	−15	40	
14	Roda JC Kerkrade	34	8	10	16	34	55	−21	34	
15	Excelsior	34	7	9	18	34	60	−26	30	
16	Willem II (O)	34	6	11	17	35	53	−18	29	Qualification for the relegation play-offs
17	De Graafschap (R)	34	5	8	21	39	66	−27	23	Qualification for the relegation play-offs
18	Cambuur (R)	34	3	9	22	33	79	−46	18	Relegation to Eerste Divisie

Source: Eredivisie, NUsport, Soccerway
Rules for classification: 1) Points; 2) Goal difference; 3) Goals scored; 4) Head-to-head points; 5) Head-to-head goal difference; 6) Head-to-head away goals scored; 7) Play-off (only if deciding champion, European competitions, or relegation); 8) Draw.
(C) Champions; (O) Play-off winners; (R) Relegated

== Results ==
Home \ Away	ADO	AJX	AZ	CAM	GRA	EXC	FEY	GRO	HEE	HER	NEC	PEC	PSV	RJC	TWE	UTR	VIT	WIL
ADO Den Haag		0–1	1–2	2–1	1–1	3–3	1–0	0–1	1–1	0–1	1–0	0–2	2–2	2–2	2–1	1–1	2–2	1–1
Ajax	4–0		4–1	5–1	2–1	3–0	2–1	2–0	5–2	0–0	2–2	3–0	1–2	6–0	4–0	2–2	1–0	3–0
AZ	0–1	0–3		3–1	4–1	2–0	4–2	4–1	3–1	3–1	2–4	5–1	2–4	0–1	3–1	2–2	1–0	0–0
Cambuur	1–1	0–1	1–1		2–3	0–2	0–2	2–2	0–1	1–6	3–1	1–0	0–6	0–1	0–0	0–2	0–2	1–1
De Graafschap	3–1	1–1	1–3	2–2		2–0	1–2	1–2	0–1	0–1	1–1	0–3	3–6	3–0	1–1	0–1	2–2	2–2
Excelsior	2–4	0–2	2–2	1–4	3–0		2–4	2–1	1–1	1–3	2–0	2–2	1–3	0–1	1–1	1–0	0–3	0–0
Feyenoord	0–2	1–1	3–1	3–1	3–1	3–0		1–1	1–2	3–0	1–0	2–0	0–2	1–1	5–0	3–2	2–0	1–0
Groningen	2–1	1–2	2–0	2–0	3–1	2–0	1–1		3–1	2–1	0–0	2–0	0–3	1–0	1–1	1–4	0–3	2–1
Heerenveen	0–4	0–2	4–2	2–0	3–1	2–1	2–5	1–2		0–1	1–1	1–1	1–1	3–0	1–3	0–4	0–0	3–1
Heracles	1–1	0–2	3–6	3–1	2–1	0–0	2–2	2–1	2–0		3–0	2–0	2–1	0–5	2–0	1–1	1–1	2–1
NEC	4–1	0–2	0–3	2–1	2–0	1–0	3–1	1–1	2–0	1–0		2–2	0–3	1–2	2–0	1–0	2–1	1–0
PEC Zwolle	2–1	0–2	2–1	2–2	2–1	3–0	3–1	1–3	5–2	1–1	2–0		1–3	3–1	2–1	1–2	1–5	4–1
PSV	2–0	0–2	3–0	6–2	4–2	1–1	3–1	2–0	1–1	2–0	2–1	3–2		1–1	4–2	3–1	2–0	2–0
Roda JC	1–1	2–2	0–1	1–1	1–0	1–2	1–1	0–0	1–2	3–1	0–0	0–5	0–3		0–1	1–0	1–2	2–3
Twente	1–4	2–2	2–2	3–0	2–1	2–0	0–1	2–0	1–4	4–0	1–0	2–1	1–3	2–1		3–1	2–2	1–3
Utrecht	2–2	1–0	1–3	3–3	0–2	2–1	1–2	2–0	1–1	4–2	3–1	1–0	0–2	1–1	4–2		2–1	2–1
Vitesse Arnhem	2–2	1–3	0–2	4–1	3–0	0–0	0–2	5–0	3–0	1–1	1–0	1–1	0–1	3–0	5–1	1–3		0–1
Willem II	0–2	0–4	0–2	3–0	0–0	2–3	0–1	1–1	2–2	0–0	0–1	0–1	2–2	3–2	2–3	3–1	1–1	

Legend: Blue = home team win; Yellow = draw; Red = away team win.

== Number of teams by provinces ==
Number of teams	Province	Team(s)
3	Gelderland	De Graafschap, NEC and Vitesse
3	Overijssel	Heracles, PEC Zwolle, and Twente
3	South Holland	ADO Den Haag, Excelsior, and Feyenoord
2	Friesland	Cambuur and Heerenveen
2	North Brabant	PSV and Willem II
2	North Holland	Ajax and AZ
1	Groningen	Groningen
1	Limburg	Roda JC
1	Utrecht	Utrecht

== Season statistics ==
=== Top scorers ===
Rank	Player	Club	Goals
1	(Netherlands) Vincent Janssen	AZ	27
2	(Netherlands) Luuk de Jong	PSV	26
3	(Poland) Arkadiusz Milik	Ajax	21
4	(Netherlands) Dirk Kuyt	Feyenoord	19
5	(France) Sébastien Haller	Utrecht	17
5	(Morocco) Hakim Ziyech	Twente	17
7	(Japan) Mike Havenaar	ADO Den Haag	16
7	(Venezuela) Christian Santos	NEC	16
9	(Netherlands) Michiel Kramer	Feyenoord	14
9	(South Africa) Lars Veldwijk	PEC Zwolle	14

=== Hat-tricks ===
Player	For	Against	Result	Date
(Morocco) Oussama Tannane^{4}	Heracles	Cambuur	6–1	22 August 2015
(Netherlands) Luuk de Jong	PSV	Cambuur	6–0	12 September 2015
(South Africa) Lars Veldwijk	PEC Zwolle	Excelsior	3–0	12 September 2015
(Netherlands) Dirk Kuyt	Feyenoord	Heerenveen	5–2	18 October 2015
(Netherlands) Dirk Kuyt	Feyenoord	AZ	3–1	25 October 2015
(Netherlands) Michiel Kramer	Feyenoord	Excelsior	4–2	28 November 2015
(Denmark) Lucas Andersen	Willem II	Twente	3–1	28 November 2015
(Netherlands) Vincent Janssen	AZ	Feyenoord	4–2	24 January 2016
(Netherlands) Vincent Janssen^{4}	AZ	PEC Zwolle	5–1	16 April 2016

Note

^{4} Player scored 4 goals

=== Assists ===
Rank	Player	Club	Assists
1	(France) Édouard Duplan	ADO Den Haag	11
2	(Netherlands) Rick Karsdorp	Feyenoord	10
2	(Netherlands) Jürgen Locadia	PSV	10
2	(South Africa) Lars Veldwijk	PEC Zwolle	10
2	(Morocco) Hakim Ziyech	Twente	10
6	(Mexico) Andrés Guardado	PSV	9
6	(Netherlands) Joris van Overeem	AZ	9
8	(Netherlands) Dabney dos Santos	AZ	8
8	(Serbia) Nemanja Gudelj	Ajax	8
8	(Netherlands) Luuk de Jong	PSV	8
8	(Netherlands) Davy Klaassen	Ajax	8
8	(Sweden) Sam Larsson	Heerenveen	8

=== Discipline ===
==== Player ====
- Most yellow cards: 10
  - Lucas Bijker (Heerenveen)
  - Funso Ojo (Willem II)
- Most red cards: 2
  - Joey van den Berg (Heerenveen)
  - Ouasim Bouy (PEC Zwolle)
  - Sander Fischer (Excelsior)
  - Derrick Luckassen (AZ)
  - Mark van der Maarel (Utrecht)
  - Harm Zeinstra (Cambuur)

==== Club ====
- Most yellow cards: 65
  - Heerenveen
- Most red cards: 5
  - Cambuur
  - Utrecht

== Attendances ==
Pos	Team	Total	High	Low	Average	Change
1	Ajax	681,147	51,875	48,494	48,653	−1.5%
2	Feyenoord	617,500	47,500	47,500	47,500	+4.6%
3	PSV	433,600	35,000	32,000	33,354	+2.7%
4	Twente	334,300	24,900	24,900	24,900	−12.7%
5	Heerenveen	300,051	24,645	20,100	22,373	−8.0%
6	Groningen	271,765	21,241	19,277	20,259	+0.3%
8	Utrecht	228,313	16,364	16,364	16,364	−1.7%
9	AZ	207,862	16,673	14,144	15,409	−0.7%
10	Roda JC	202,624	13,472	13,130	13,301	+24.2%^{1}
7	Vitesse Arnhem	233,393	13,212	13,212	13,212	−23.2%
15	ADO Den Haag	155,929	13,125	12,293	12,709	+6.1%
14	Heracles	157,095	12,084	12,084	12,084	+45.1%
13	PEC Zwolle	158,608	12,123	11,650	11,887	−2.7%
12	NEC	161,589	12,321	10,240	11,281	+18.3%^{1}
11	Willem II	173,862	11,000	11,000	11,000	−9.1%
17	Cambuur	126,874	10,000	9,630	9,815	+1.1%
16	De Graafschap	146,477	8,100	8,100	8,100	+64.4%^{1}
18	Excelsior	49,821	3,394	3,394	3,394	−3.5%
	League total	498,612	48,494	3,394	18,467	−1.5%

Updated to games played on 23 August 2015
Source: World football
Notes:
Median attendances of the 2014–15 season will be shown until the league starts.
1: Team played last season in Eerste Divisie

== Play-offs ==
=== European competition ===
Four teams played for a spot in the 2016–17 UEFA Europa League third qualifying round.

Semi-finals
PEC Zwolle	0	2	2
Utrecht	0	5	5
Groningen	2	1	3
Heracles (e)	1	5	6

Final
Heracles*	1	2	3
Utrecht	1	0	1

Key: * = Play-off winners, (a) = Wins because of away goals rule, (e) = Wins after extra time in second leg, (p) = Wins after penalty shoot-out.

=== Promotion/relegation play-offs ===
Ten teams, two from the Eredivisie and eight from the Eerste Divisie, played for two spots in the 2016–17 Eredivisie, the remaining eight teams play in the 2016–17 Eerste Divisie.

First round
MVV Maastricht	2	2	4
Volendam	1	1	2
Almere City	4	4	8
Emmen	1	1	2

Second round
MVV Maastricht	0	1	1
De Graafschap	1	2	3
Go Ahead Eagles	1	2	3
VVV-Venlo	0	2	2
Almere City	0	2	2
Willem II	1	5	6
FC Eindhoven	1	0	1
NAC Breda	0	2	2

Third round
De Graafschap	1	1	2
Go Ahead Eagles*	4	1	5
Willem II*	1	3	4
NAC Breda	2	1	3

Key: * = Play-off winners, (a) = Wins because of away goals rule, (e) = Wins after extra time in second leg, (p) = Wins after penalty shoot-out.

== Awards ==
=== Annual awards ===
Annual awards
Award	Winner	Club
Dutch Footballer of the Year	(Netherlands) Davy Klaassen	Ajax
Johan Cruyff Trophy	(Netherlands) Vincent Janssen	AZ Alkmaar
Eredivisie top scorer	(Netherlands) Vincent Janssen	AZ Alkmaar
Rinus Michels Award	(Netherlands) Erik ten Hag	FC Utrecht

=== Team of the Season ===
Team of the Season
Goalkeeper	(Belgium) Bram Castro (Heracles Almelo)			
Defenders	(Netherlands) Timo Letschert (Utrecht)		(Netherlands) Jeffrey Bruma (PSV Eindhoven)	(Netherlands) Joël Veltman (Ajax)
Midfielders	(Mexico) Andrés Guardado (PSV Eindhoven)	(Morocco) Hakim Ziyech (Twente)	(Netherlands) Davy Pröpper (PSV Eindhoven)	(Netherlands) Davy Klaassen (Ajax)
Forwards	(Netherlands) Luuk de Jong (PSV Eindhoven)	(Netherlands) Vincent Janssen (AZ)		(Netherlands) Dirk Kuyt (Feyenoord)
