= 2019–20 UAE Pro League =

UAE Pro League
- Season: 2019–20
- Champions: No title awarded
- Relegated: No relegation
- 2021 AFC Champions League: Sharjah; Shabab Al-Ahli; Al Wahda; Al Ain
- Matches: 133
- Goals: 385 (2.89 per match)
- Top goalscorer: Kodjo Fo-Doh Laba (19 goals)
- Biggest home win: Shabab Al Ahli 5–0 Kalba (28 December 2019); Al Ain 5–0 Wasl (1 February 2020)
- Biggest away win: Fujairah 1–7 Al Ain (25 October 2019)
- Highest scoring: Fujairah 1–7 Al Ain (25 October 2019); Kalba 6–2 Ajman (10 December 2019)
- Longest winning run: Shabab Al Ahli; Al Wahda (5 games)
- Longest unbeaten run: Sharjah (10 games)
- Longest winless run: Khor Fakkan (13 games)
- Longest losing run: Hatta (7 games)
- Highest attendance: 14,423; Al Ain 0–0 Al Jazira (1 November 2019)
- Lowest attendance: 277; Dhafra 1–1 Baniyas (26 September 2019)
- Total attendance: 97,291
- Average attendance: 2,316

The 2019–20 UAE Pro League was the 46th edition of the UAE Pro League. On 26 April 2019, Khor Fakkan won the first division title over Al Taawon 3–0; this is their inaugural appearance on the pro league as Khor Fakkan Club as they were previously known as Al Khaleej, having been absent from the Pro League for twelve years. Hatta later returned to the pro league after a 1–0 away victory against Al Hamriyah secured them a spot on the first division after getting relegated a year ago. Sharjah are the defending champions. The League was put on hold on March due to the COVID-19 pandemic, however on June, with the majority of 12 out of 14 clubs votes, the league was cancelled and the champion is yet to be decided. On 18th of June, it was declared that this season will end with no champion despite Shabab Al-Ahli leading the table with 43 points and the same teams that qualified for the 2020 AFC Champions League will qualify for the 2021 AFC Champions League.

== Team changes ==
=== To Division 1 ===
Relegated to UAE Division 1

- Emirates
- Dibba Al Fujairah

=== From Division 1 ===
Promoted to UAE Pro League

- Khor Fakkan
- Hatta

== Stadia and locations ==
Locations of teams in the 2019–20 UAE Pro League

Note: Table lists clubs in alphabetical order.

Team	Home city	Stadium	Capacity
Ajman	Ajman	Ajman Stadium	5,537
Al Ain	Al-Ain	Hazza Bin Zayed Stadium	25,965
Al Dhafra	Madinat Zayed	Al Dhafra Stadium	5,020
Al Jazira	Abu Dhabi (Al Nahyan)	Mohammad Bin Zayed Stadium	42,056
Al Nasr	Dubai (Al Nasr)	Al-Maktoum Stadium	15,058
Al Wahda	Abu Dhabi (Al Nahyan)	Al Nahyan Stadium	12,201
Al Wasl	Dubai (Zabeel)	Zabeel Stadium	8,439
Baniyas	Abu Dhabi (Al Shamkha)	Baniyas Stadium	10,000
Fujairah	Fujairah	Fujairah Club Stadium	10,645
Hatta	Hatta	Hamdan Bin Rashid Stadium	5,000
Kalba	Kalba	Ittihad Kalba Stadium	8,500
Khor Fakkan	Khor Fakkan	Saqr bin Mohammad al Qassimi Stadium	7,500
Shabab Al Ahli	Dubai (Deira)	Al-Rashid Stadium	12,052
Sharjah	Sharjah	Sharjah Stadium	20,000

== Personnel and kits ==
Note: Flags indicate national team as has been defined under FIFA eligibility rules. Players may hold more than one non-FIFA nationality.

Team	Head Coach	Captain	Kit Manufacturer	Shirt Sponsor
Ajman	(Egypt) Ayman Elramady	(United Arab Emirates) Rashed Malallah	Hummel	Ajman Bank
Al Ain	(Portugal) Pedro Emanuel	(United Arab Emirates) Ismail Ahmed	Nike	First Gulf Bank
Al Dhafra	(Serbia) Vuk Rašović	(United Arab Emirates) Ahmed Ali	Adidas	Ruwais
Al Jazira	(Netherlands) Marcel Keizer	(United Arab Emirates) Ali Khasif	Adidas	Healthpoint
Al Nasr	(Croatia) Krunoslav Jurčić	(Spain) Álvaro Negredo	Nike	Emirates NBD
Al Wahda	(Spain) Manuel Jiménez	(United Arab Emirates) Ismail Matar	Adidas	Cadillac
Al Wasl	(Romania) Laurențiu Reghecampf	(United Arab Emirates) Fábio de Lima	New Balance	Emaar
Baniyas	(Germany) Winfried Schäfer	(United Arab Emirates) Fawaz Awana	Adidas	Secure Engineering
Fujairah	(Italy) Fabio Viviani	(United Arab Emirates) Hilal Saeed	Nike	Asas
Hatta	(Greece) Christos Kontis	(United Arab Emirates) Mahmoud Hassan	Macron	
Kalba	(Uruguay) Jorge Da Silva	(United Arab Emirates) Mansor Abbas	Erreà	Unknown
Khor Fakkan	(Serbia) Goran Tufegdžić	(United Arab Emirates) Saif Mohammed	Adidas	Khor Fakkan Beach Resort
Shabab Al Ahli	(Spain) Gerard Zaragoza	(United Arab Emirates) Majed Naser	Nike	Nakheel
Sharjah	(United Arab Emirates) Abdulaziz Mohamed	(United Arab Emirates) Shahin Abdulrahman	Adidas	Saif Zone

=== Foreign players ===
All teams could register as many foreign players as they want, but could only use four on the field each game.

- Players name in **bold** indicates the player is registered during the mid-season transfer window.
- Players in italics were out of the squad or left the club within the season, after the pre-season transfer window, or in the mid-season transfer window, and at least had one appearance.

Club	Player 1	Player 2	Player 3	Player 4	Former Players
Ajman	(Brazil) Vander Vieira	(Cameroon) **Sébastien Siani**	(The Gambia) Bubacarr Trawally	(Ghana) William Owusu	(Mali) Tongo Doumbia (Nigeria) Godwin Mensha
Al Ain	(Togo) Kodjo Fo-Doh Laba	(Hungary) **Balázs Dzsudzsák**	(Japan) Tsukasa Shiotani	(Kazakhstan) **Bauyrzhan Islamkhan**	(Algeria) Abderrahmane Meziane (Brazil) Caio
Al Dhafra	(Jordan) **Yaseen Al-Bakhit**	(Brazil) Diego Jardel	(Brazil) João Pedro	(Morocco) Issam El Adoua	(Netherlands) Mikhail Rosheuvel
Al Jazira	(Brazil) Keno	(Morocco) Mourad Batna	(Serbia) Miloš Kosanović	(South Africa) Thulani Serero	
Al Nasr	(Chile) Esteban Pavez	(Curaçao) Brandley Kuwas	(Spain) Álvaro Negredo	(Portugal) Tozé	
Al Wahda	(South Korea) **Lee Myung-joo**	(South Korea) Rim Chang-woo	(Democratic Republic of the Congo) **Paul-José M'Poku**	(Spain) **Gaspar Panadero**	(Argentina) Sebastián Tagliabúe (Brazil) Leonardo (Uruguay) Nicolás Milesi (Spain) Carlitos
Al Wasl	(Brazil) Lucas Galvão	(Brazil) Welliton	(Ecuador) Fernando Gaibor	(Brazil) Natan Felipe	(Brazil) Fábio Lima
Baniyas	(Azerbaijan) **Richard Almeida**	(Brazil) Luiz Antônio	(Brazil) **Zé Roberto**	(Serbia) Saša Ivković	(South Africa) Ayanda Patosi (Spain) Pedro Conde
Fujairah	(Brazil) Fernando Gabriel	(Brazil) **Jefferson Assis**	(Brazil) Jhonnattann	(Ghana) **Ernest Asante**	(Ivory Coast) Martial Yao (Liberia) William Jebor
Hatta	(Brazil) Cleylton	(Brazil) Daniel Amora	(Brazil) **Neilton**	(Brazil) **Samuel Rosa**	(Portugal) Ricardo Valente (Spain) Cristian López
Khor Fakkan	(Brazil) **Bruno Lamas**	(Brazil) Dodô	(Brazil) **Ramon Lopes**	(Brazil) **Ricardinho**	(Brazil) Bismark (Brazil) Pedro Júnior (Brazil) Róbson (Uzbekistan) Temurkhuja Abdukholiqov
Kalba	(Brazil) **Wanderson**	(Cape Verde) **Ricardo Gomes**	(Netherlands) **Navarone Foor**	(Togo) Peniel Mlapa	(Brazil) Henrique (Hungary) Balázs Dzsudzsák (Jordan) Yaseen Al-Bakhit
Shabab Al Ahli	(Argentina) Federico Cartabia	(Brazil) Leonardo	(Spain) **Pedro Conde**	(Moldova) Henrique Luvannor	(Switzerland) Davide Mariani
Sharjah	(Brazil) **Caio**	(Brazil) Igor Coronado	(Cape Verde) Ryan Mendes	(Uzbekistan) Otabek Shukurov	(Cape Verde) Ricardo Gomes

=== Managerial changes ===
Team	Outgoing manager	Date of vacancy	Manner of departure	Pos.	Incoming manager	Date of appointment
Al Ain	(Spain) Juan Carlos Garrido	1 June 2019	Sacked	Pre-season	(Croatia) Ivan Leko	1 June 2019
Al Wahda	(Netherlands) Henk ten Cate	8 June 2019	End of contract	Pre-season	(Netherlands) Maurice Steijn	9 June 2019
Hatta	(United Arab Emirates) Walid Obaid	8 June 2019	End of contract	Pre-season	(Greece) Christos Kontis	10 June 2019
Al Jazira	(Netherlands) Damiën Hertog	8 June 2019	End of contract	Pre-season	(Netherlands) Jurgen Streppel	16 June 2019
Fujairah	(United Arab Emirates) Abdullah Mesfer	8 June 2019	End of contract	Pre-season	(Algeria) Madjid Bougherra	16 June 2019
Baniyas	(Croatia) Krunoslav Jurčić	8 June 2019	End of contract	Pre-season	(Germany) Winfried Schäfer	8 July 2019
Khor Fakkan	(Iraq) Abdulwahab Abdulkadir	17 July 2019	Resigned	Pre-season	(Brazil) Paulo Comelli	17 July 2019
Kalba	(Italy) Fabio Viviani	10 October 2019	Sacked	11th	(Uruguay) Jorge Da Silva	12 October 2019
Al Jazira	(Netherlands) Jurgen Streppel	13 October 2019	Sacked	7th	(Netherlands) Marcel Keizer	13 October 2019
Al Nasr	(Brazil) Caio Zanardi	14 October 2019	Sacked	11th	(Croatia) Krunoslav Jurčić	14 October 2019
Al Wahda	(Netherlands) Maurice Steijn	17 October 2019	Sacked	10th	(Spain) Manuel Jiménez	17 October 2019
Khor Fakkan	(Brazil) Paulo Comelli	30 October 2019	Sacked	14th	(Serbia) Goran Tufegdžić	31 October 2019
Al Ain	(Croatia) Ivan Leko	21 December 2019	Mutual consent	4th	(Portugal) Pedro Emanuel	5 January 2020
Fujairah	(Algeria) Madjid Bougherra	9 February 2020	Mutual consent	13th	(Italy) Fabio Viviani	10 February 2020
Shabab Al Ahli	(Argentina) Rodolfo Arruabarrena	8 March 2020	Sacked	1st	(Spain) Gerard Zaragoza	9 March 2020

== League table ==
Pos	Team	Pld	W	D	L	GF	GA	GD	Pts	Qualification or relegation
1	Shabab Al Ahli	19	13	4	2	42	13	+29	43	Qualification for AFC Champions League group stage
2	Al Ain	19	11	4	4	46	21	+25	37	Qualification for AFC Champions League play-off round
3	Al Jazira	19	11	3	5	29	17	+12	36	
4	Sharjah	19	10	5	4	38	23	+15	35	Qualification for AFC Champions League group stage
5	Al Wahda	19	11	2	6	31	29	+2	35	Qualification for AFC Champions League play-off round
6	Al Nasr	19	9	4	6	24	19	+5	31	
7	Al Dhafra	19	9	2	8	26	23	+3	29	
8	Al Wasl	19	8	5	6	31	33	−2	29	
9	Baniyas	19	6	5	8	21	26	−5	23	
10	Ajman	19	4	6	9	25	39	−14	18	
11	Kalba	19	5	1	13	24	39	−15	16	
12	Khor Fakkan	19	3	6	10	18	32	−14	15	
13	Hatta	19	3	4	12	15	32	−17	13	
14	Fujairah	19	3	3	13	15	36	−21	12	

Source: Arabian Gulf League
Rules for classification: 1) points; 2) head-to-head goal difference; 3) head-to-head goals scored; 4) head-to-head away goals scored; 5) goal difference; 6) number of goals scored; 7) number of away goals scored; 8) head-to-head points; 9) fair play ranking 10) draw

== Results ==
Home \ Away	AJM	AIN	DHA	JAZ	NAS	WAH	WAS	YAS	FUJ	HAT	KAL	KHF	SAD	SHR
Ajman		1–4	1–2	1–1	3–1	2–4	1–0	1–4	—	3–1	—	1–1	2–5	—
Al Ain	—		1–2	0–0	2–2	—	5–0	—	2–1	2–1	3–2	—	1–2	1–1
Al Dhafra	1–0	—		0–1	2–1	1–2	1–3	1–1	3–1	—	1–1	—	0–1	3–1
Al Jazira	—	3–1	2–0		1–2	0–1	—	—	1–0	—	3–2	0–1	0–0	0–2
Al Nasr	0–1	—	1–2	—		3–0	0–0	0–1	1–0	—	2–0	1–0	1–0	1–3
Al Wahda	1–0	0–2	3–1	3–2	1–3		2–2	3–0	2–1	2–0	—	2–2	—	—
Al Wasl	1–1	1–3	2–1	0–4	0–0	—		5–1	3–2	3–1	2–0	—	—	1–5
Baniyas	2–2	0–0	1–0	1–2	—	4–3	—		—	1–0	2–1	1–1	0–1	
Fujairah	1–1	1–7	—	—	—	1–0	—	1–0		0–1	0–1	2–1	0–0	0–3
Hatta	—	0–3	1–2	0–2	1–2	—	2–3	—	—		1–0	1–1	0–3	2–2
Kalba	6–2	1–4	—	1–2	—	1–2	—	2–1	1–0	0–1		3–2	—	1–3
Khor Fakkan	—	0–3	0–2	1–3	0–1	—	1–3	2–1	2–2	1–1	—		0–2	2–1
Shabab Al Ahli	3–1	—	—	1–2	2–2	4–0	1–1	2–0	5–1	1–0	5–0	—		3–2
Sharjah	1–1	3–2	—	—	—	1–2	2–1	0–0	2–1	1–1	3–1	2–0	—	

Source: Arabian Gulf League
Legend: Blue = home team win; Yellow = draw; Red = away team win.
For upcoming matches, an "a" indicates there is an article about the rivalry between the two participants.

== Season statistics ==
=== Top goalscorers ===
Rank	Player	Club	Goals
1	(Togo) Kodjo Fo-Doh Laba	Al Ain	19
2	(United Arab Emirates) Sebastián Tagliabúe	Al Wahda	15
3	(United Arab Emirates) Ahmed Khalil	Shabab Al Ahli	13
3	(United Arab Emirates) Ali Mabkhout	Al Jazira	13
5	(United Arab Emirates) Fábio Lima	Al Wasl	12
5	(Brazil) João Pedro	Al Dhafra	12
7	(Cape Verde) Ryan Mendes	Sharjah	11
7	(Togo) Peniel Mlapa	Kalba	11
9	(Brazil) Welliton	Al Wasl	9
10	(Spain) Álvaro Negredo	Al Nasr	8

=== Hat-tricks ===
Player	For	Against	Result	Date	Round
(Spain) Pedro Conde^{4}	Baniyas	Al Wahda	4–3 (H)	4 October 2019	3
(Togo) Kodjo Fo-Doh Laba^{4}	Al Ain	Fujairah	7–1 (A)	25 October 2019	5
(United Arab Emirates) Ali Mabkhout	Al Jazira	Al Wasl	4–0 (A)	20 December 2019	10
(United Arab Emirates) Ahmed Khalil	Shabab Al Ahli	Kalba	5–0 (H)	28 December 2019	11
(United Arab Emirates) Fábio Lima	Al Wasl	Baniyas	5–1 (H)	2 January 2020	12
(Togo) Kodjo Fo-Doh Laba	Al Ain	Khor Fakkan	3–0 (A)	23 January 2020	13

Notes

^{4} Player scored 4 goals
(H) – Home team
(A) – Away team

=== Positions by round ===
Leader and qualification to AFC Champions League group stage
qualification to AFC Champions League group stage
qualification to AFC Champions League Play off round
Relegation to UAE First Division League

Team ╲ Round	1	2	3	4	5	6	7	8	9	10	11	12	13	14	15	16	17	18	19
Shabab Al Ahli	1	1	2	2	3	2	2	2	2	2	1	1	1	1	1	1	1	1	1
Al Ain	4	3	4	3	2	3	3	3	3	4	4	5	2	3	2	2	2	2	2
Al Jazira	2	5	7	4	4	4	5	4	4	3	3	4	4	2	4	3	4	3	3
Sharjah	3	2	1	1	1	1	1	1	1	1	2	2	3	4	3	5	3	4	4
Al Wahda	11	6	10	11	8	6	6	7	8	6	8	8	8	7	5	4	6	5	5
Al Nasr	8	9	11	9	7	5	4	5	5	5	5	3	6	5	6	7	7	7	6
Al Dhafra	13	11	8	6	5	9	11	8	9	7	6	6	5	6	7	6	5	6	7
Al Wasl	9	10	13	14	12	8	8	6	6	8	7	7	7	8	8	8	8	8	8
Baniyas	7	8	6	8	9	10	10	10	7	9	10	11	9	9	9	9	9	9	9
Ajman	6	4	3	5	6	7	7	11	12	11	9	10	10	10	10	10	10	10	10
Kalba	10	14	14	12	13	11	12	9	10	10	11	9	11	11	11	11	11	11	11
Khor Fakkan	12	12	12	13	14	14	14	14	14	14	14	14	14	14	14	14	12	12	12
Hatta	14	13	9	10	11	13	9	12	11	13	13	13	13	13	13	12	13	13	13
Fujairah	5	7	5	7	10	12	13	13	13	12	12	12	12	12	12	13	14	14	14

Source: UAE Pro League

== Attendances ==
=== By round ===
As of 10 November 2019

2019–20 Arabian Gulf League Attendance
Round	Total	GP.	Avg. Per Game
Round 1	21,890	7	3,127
Round 2	15,662	7	2,237
Round 3	17,689	7	2,527
Round 4	9,702	7	1,386
Round 5	8,339	7	1,191
Round 6	24,009	7	3,429
Round 7	15,341	7	2,191
Round 8	0	0	0
Total	112,632	49	2,299

== Number of teams by Emirates ==
	Emirate	Number of teams	Teams
1	(Emirate of Abu Dhabi) Abu Dhabi	5	Al Ain, Al Jazira, Al Wahda, Baniyas and Al Dhafra
2	(Emirate of Dubai) Dubai	4	Shabab Al Ahli, Al Nasr, Al Wasl and Hatta
3	(Emirate of Sharjah) Sharjah	3	Sharjah, Kalba and Khor Fakkan
4	(Emirate of Ajman) Ajman	1	Ajman
4	Fujairah	1	Fujairah
