= Bekveld =

- Hamlet
- Location of Gooi and Bekveld in the municipality of Bronckhorst

- Location in the province of Gelderland in the Netherlands Bekveld (Netherlands)
- Coordinates: 52°3′N 6°18′E
- Country: Netherlands
- Province: Gelderland
- Municipality: Bronckhorst
- Village: Hengelo
- Elevation: 13.8 m (45 ft)

Population (2023)
  - Total: c. 350 (together with Gooi)
- Time zone: UTC+1 (CET)
  - Summer (DST): UTC+2 (CEST)
- Postcode: 7255
- Area code: 0313

Bekveld (Dutch pronunciation: [ˈbɛkfɛlt]) is a hamlet located in the Dutch municipality of Bronckhorst in Gelderland. It is located between Hengelo, Keijenborg and Toldijk. Before the municipal reorganization in 2005, Bekveld belonged to the municipality of Hengelo.

In 2010, the hamlets of Gooi and Bekveld together had 135 houses and 360 inhabitants. This population was still 350 in 2023.

The Bekveld Tug of War Association (TTV Bekveld) has existed since 1968. The club was, among other things, Dutch youth tug-of-war champion (1970) and third at the world championships (1985).
