= Hengelo, Gelderland =

Hengelo
- Flag Coat of arms
- Interactive map of Hengelo
- Coordinates: 52°03′06″N 6°18′38″E
- Country: Netherlands
- Province: Gelderland
- Municipality: Bronckhorst

Area
  - Total: 28.643 ha (70.78 acres)

Population (2008)
  - Total: 8,500

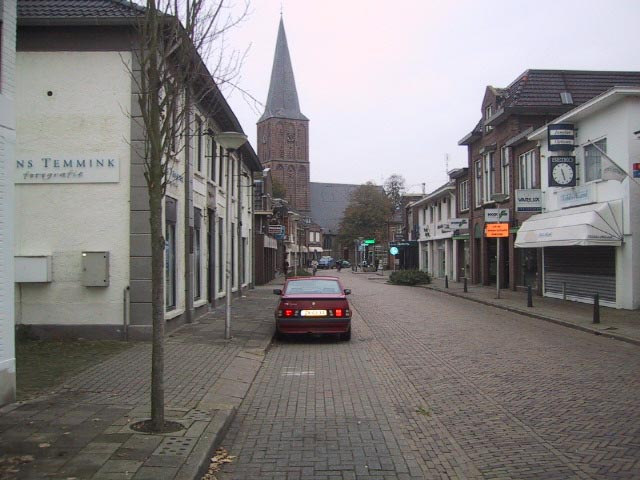
Hengelo

Hengelo is a town in the eastern part of The Netherlands, province of Gelderland (not to be confused with the much larger city of Hengelo, Overijssel). The predominantly rural area it is situated in is known as the Achterhoek. Hengelo (Gelderland) is famous for various horse-related activities (markets, horse-jumping, etc.). Once a year a motorbike race takes place just outside the town on a streetcircuit. It used to be a separate municipality and is now part of the municipality of Bronckhorst.

== Gallery ==
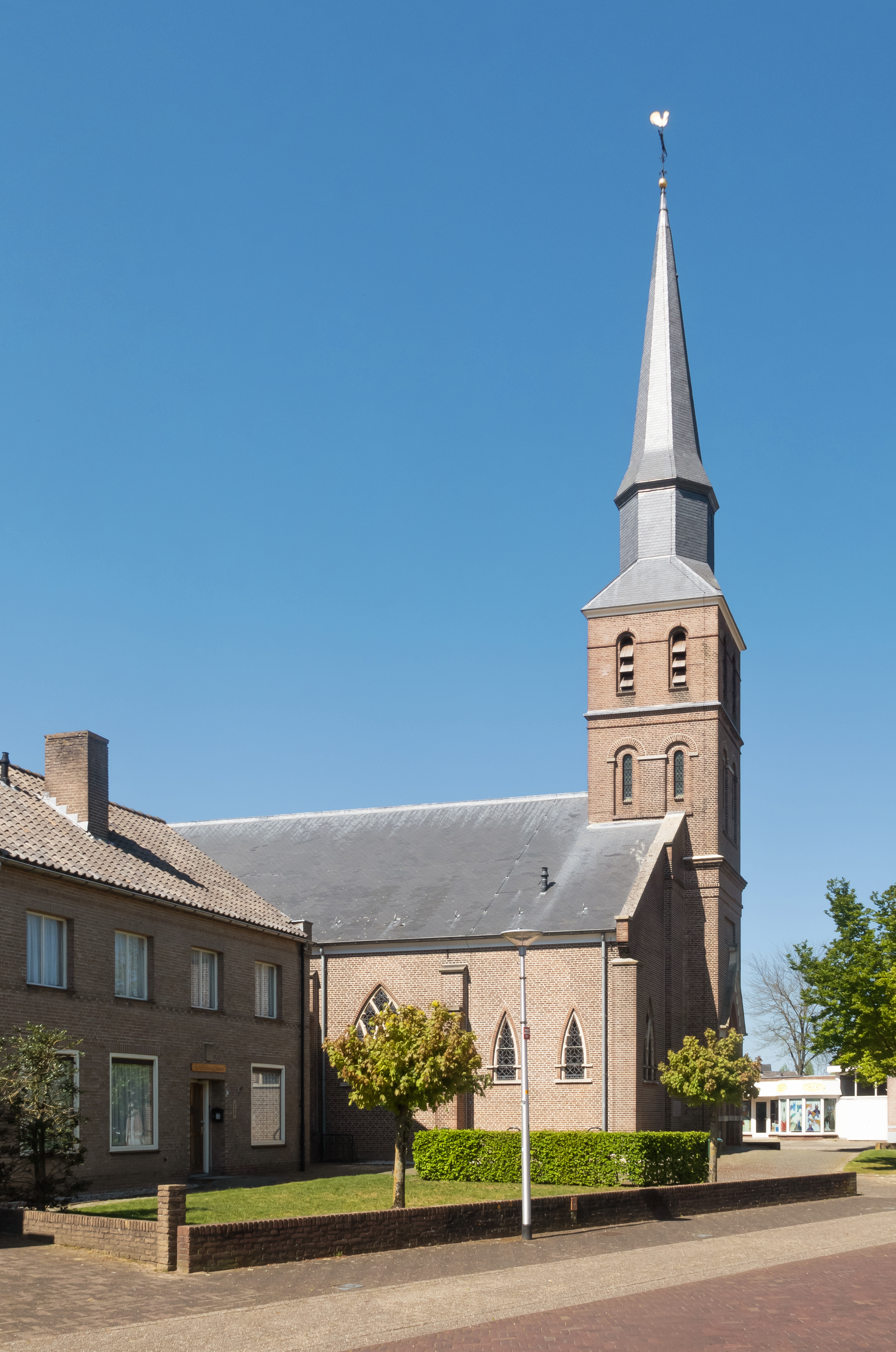
Church: de Heilige Wilibrordkerk

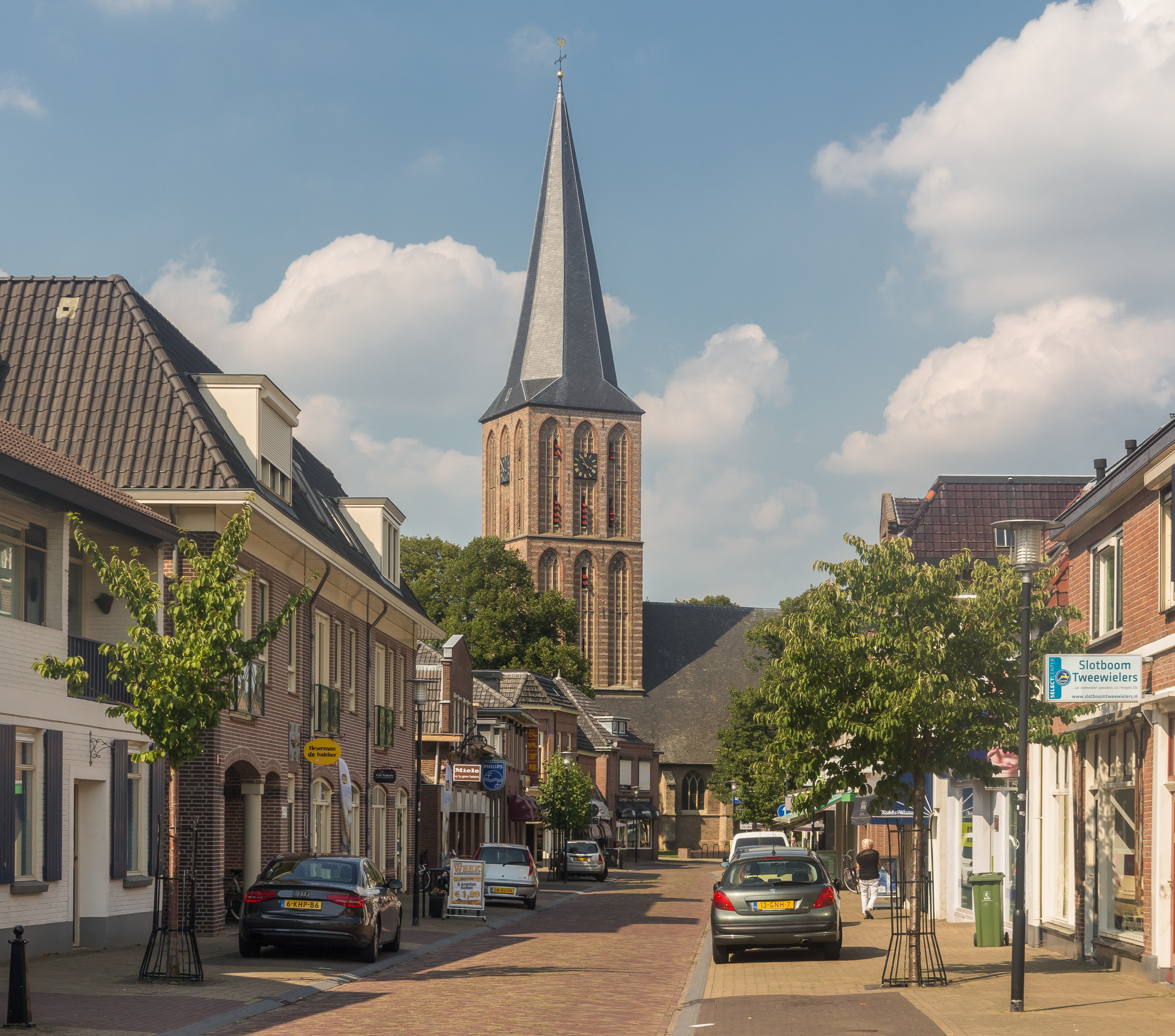
Church: de Remigiuskerk

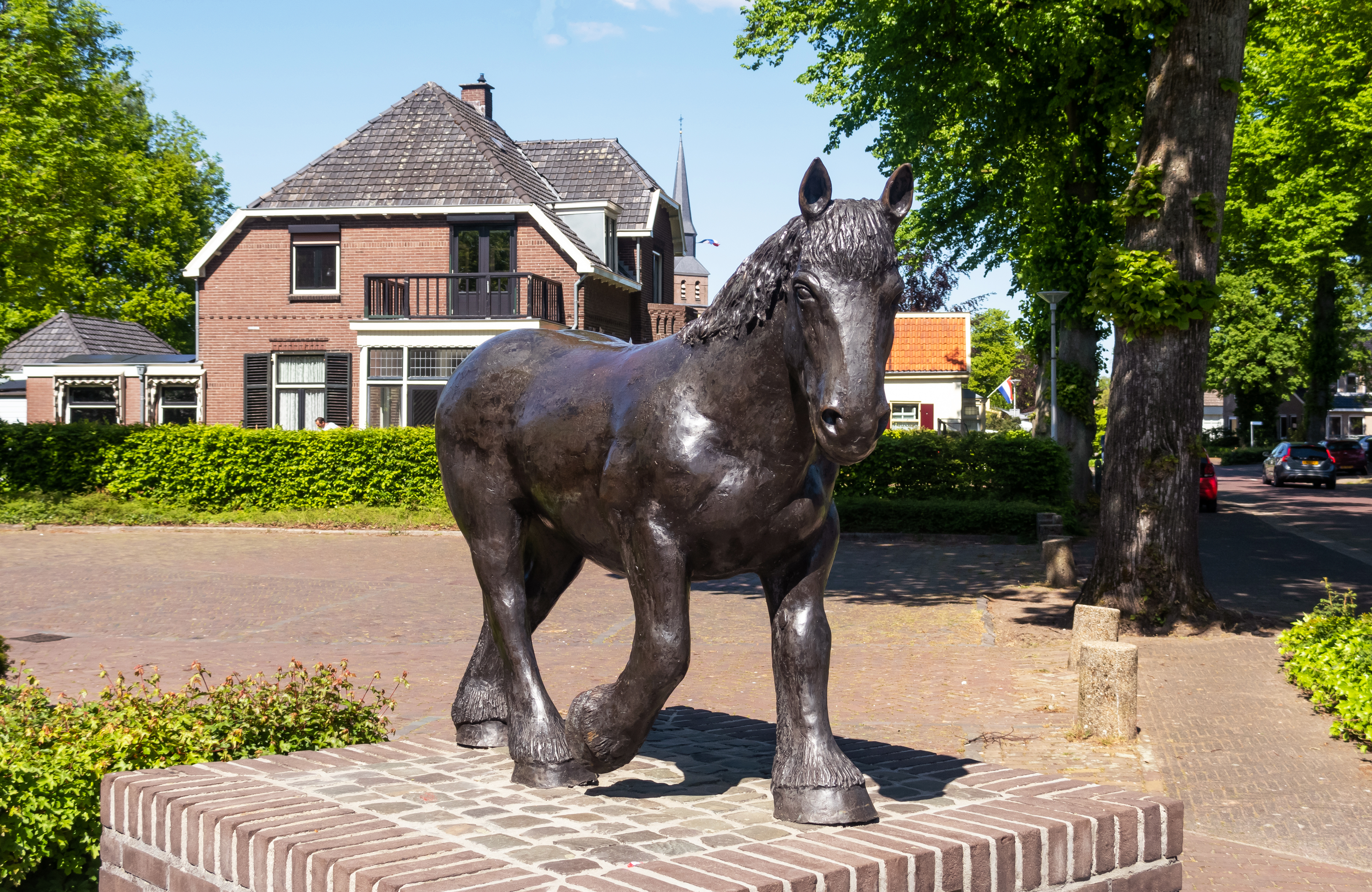
Sculpture Paardendorp (horse village) Hengelo

== Population centres ==
Prior to 2005, Hengelo (Gld) was a municipality with approx. 8500 residents, living in the following villages:

- Hengelo: 4'700 residents
- Keijenborg: 1'200
- Noordink: 580
- Dunsborg: 500
- Bekveld en Gooi: 420
- Varssel: 390
- Veldhoek: 110

This information relates to CBS statistical information in 2002.

== Born in Hengelo (Gld.) ==
- Annemarie Jorritsma-Lebbink (1 June 1950), Dutch politician (VVD), former mayor of the city Almere and member of the Senate.
- René Notten (20 November 1949 - 22 August 1995), former soccer player who played at Pax, FC Twente, Ajax and Feyenoord.

Raised in Hengelo

- Hendrik Jan Lovink singer and guitarist of the band Jovink en de Voederbietels

== Bronckhorst ==
Hengelo (Gld) has merged with the following neighbouring municipalities:

- Zelhem
- Steenderen
- Vorden
- Hummelo en Keppel

== Founded in Hengelo ==
- Quick Sportswear
- The Grolschbusters Punk-Rock music band
- Pax Hengelo Soccerclub

This new municipality is referred to as Bronckhorst. It was formed in January 2005 as part of a large-scale administrative reorganisation in the Netherlands (gemeentelijke herindeling). The Dutch Wikipedia pages contain more information on this topic.
