= Natan Felipe =

Brazilian footballer

Personal information
- Full name: Natan Felipe Pedriali
- Date of birth: 29 January 2000 (age 26)
- Height: 1.77 m (5 ft 10 in)
- Position: Full-back

Youth career
- 2016: XV de Jaú
- 2017: Grêmio Osasco
- 2018: Maringá

Senior career*
Years	Team	Apps	(Gls)
2019–2022	Al Wasl	34	(1)
2022–2023	Al Bataeh	3	(0)
2024	Cianorte	1	(0)
- * Club domestic league appearances and goals as of 30 August 2023

Natan Felipe Pedriali (born 29 January 2000) is a Brazilian professional footballer who plays as a full-back. Currently a free agent, he most recently played for UAE Pro League club Al Bataeh.

== Career statistics ==
=== Club ===
As of match played 25 November 2022

Appearances and goals by club, season and competition
Club	Season	League			Cup (Note: Includes UAE League Cup)		Total	
Club	Season	Division	Apps	Goals	Apps	Goals	Apps	Goals
Al Wasl	2019–20	UAE Pro League	8	0	2	0	10	0
Al Wasl	2020–21	UAE Pro League	21	1	4	0	25	1
Al Wasl	2021–22	UAE Pro League	5	0	3	0	8	0
Al Wasl	Total		34	1	9	0	43	1
Al Bataeh	2022–23	UAE Pro League	3	0	1	0	4	0
Career total			37	1	10	0	47	1
