= Damiën Hertog =

Dutch footballer (born 1974)

Damien Hertog
Personal information
- Date of birth: 3 December 1974 (age 51)
- Place of birth: Rotterdam, Netherlands
- Position: Midfielder

Youth career
- Zwaluwen Vlaardingen
- SVVSMC
- Feyenoord

Senior career*
Years	Team	Apps	(Gls)
1994–1999	Excelsior	98	(15)
1999–2002	RBC	86	(17)
2002–2004	De Graafschap	27	(2)
2004–2005	RBC	33	(2)
2005–2008	Excelsior	39	(13)
Total		283	(49)

Managerial career
- 2010–2011: Excelsior Maassluis
- 2011–2013: Feyenoord (U19)
- 2016–2017: Feyenoord (U19)
- 2017: APOEL (assistant)
- 2018: Al Jazira (assistant)
- 2018–2019: Al Jazira
- 2019–2022: Saudi Arabia U21
- * Club domestic league appearances and goals

Damiën Hertog (born 3 December 1974) is a Dutch retired footballer who played for Excelsior Rotterdam before retiring in 2008. His former clubs are RBC Roosendaal and De Graafschap.

== Coaching career ==
From 2008 to 2009, Hertog worked as a scout, analyst and coach for various clubs. He then became manager of Excelsior Maassluis for the 2010/11 season. But in June 2010 Feyenoord announced, that Hertog from the next summer (2011), would be the manager of the club's U19 team. From the summer 2013, he became academy manager of Feyenoord which he was until June 2016, where he returned as U19 manager.

In June 2017 it was announced that Hertog would be appointed to be the assistant coach of Mario Been at APOEL Nicosia. Been and Hertog were dismissed by APOEL after only two months in charge.

In the summer 2018, Hertog joined Al Jazira Club in Abu Dhabi as assistant manager of Marcel Keizer. However, Keizer left the club in November 2018 to become manager of Sporting CP, and Hertog took his place as manager of Jazira. He left the club at the end of the season.

On 28 August 2019, Hertog was appointed manager of the Saudi Arabian U21 national team. The Saudi football association confirmed on 16 January 2022, that they had parted ways with Hertog.
