= Jurgen Streppel =

Dutch football manager and executive (born 1969)

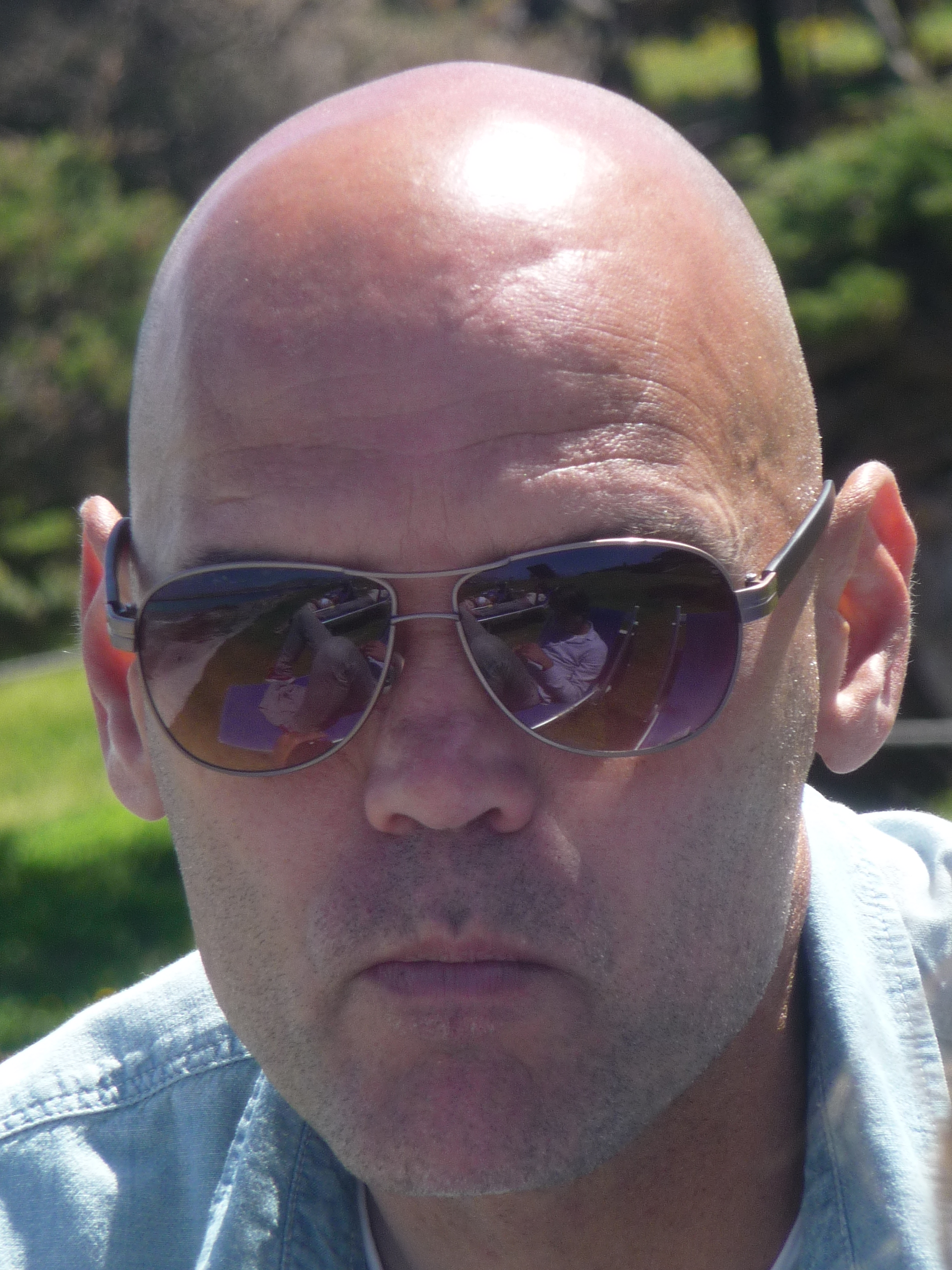
- Streppel in 2014

Personal information
- Date of birth: 25 June 1969 (age 57)
- Place of birth: Voorst, Netherlands
- Position: Midfielder

Team information
- Current team: Willem II (head coach)

Senior career*
| Years | Team | Apps | (Gls) |
| 1990–1992 | Helmond Sport | 67 | (22) |
| 1992–1997 | RKC | 104 | (11) |
| 1993–1994 | → Telstar (loan) | 12 | (1) |
| 1997–2005 | Helmond Sport | 190 | (23) |
| Total | | 373 | (57) |

Managerial career
- 2006–2008: Helmond Sport (assistant)
- 2008–2011: Helmond Sport
- 2011–2016: Willem II
- 2016–2018: Heerenveen
- 2018–2019: Anorthosis Famagusta
- 2019: Al Jazira
- 2020–2022: Roda JC
- 2026: Akritas Chlorakas
- 2026–: Willem II
- * Club domestic league appearances and goals

Jurgen Streppel (born 25 June 1969) is a Dutch professional football manager, executive and former player who is the head coach of club Willem II.

A midfielder, Streppel spent most of his playing career at Helmond Sport, with a spell at RKC in between. He began coaching at Helmond Sport and was its head coach from 2008 to 2011. At Willem II, he won promotion to the Eredivisie twice, through the play-offs in 2012 and as champions of the Eerste Divisie in 2014. He later managed SC Heerenveen, Anorthosis Famagusta, Al Jazira and Roda JC, and held director roles at Helmond Sport and Mechelen. He returned to Willem II in October 2026.

== Playing career ==
Born in Voorst, Streppel began his professional career as a midfielder at Helmond Sport in the Eerste Divisie in 1990. After two seasons, he moved to RKC, where he played in the Eredivisie until 1997. He spent the 1993–94 season on loan at Eerste Divisie club Telstar. He returned to Helmond Sport in 1997 and stayed there until 2005. In total, he made 373 league appearances and scored 57 goals.

Helmond Sport finished sixth in the 2004–05 season and reached the promotion play-offs. Streppel played his last professional match in the home play-off defeat to Sparta Rotterdam, in which he was sent off. The club's history page calls him "Mister Helmond Sport".

== Managerial career ==
=== Helmond Sport ===
Streppel began coaching youth teams at Helmond Sport in 1995, while still playing for the first team. He later became assistant to head coach Jan Poortvliet. When Poortvliet left for Southampton in 2008, Streppel was promoted to head coach. In December 2008, the club confirmed him in the role until mid-2011. General director Mario Captein credited him with a large share in the professionalisation of the club.

In the 2009–10 season, Helmond Sport reached the promotion play-offs, where it beat Sparta Rotterdam 2–1 at home in the second round but lost the return match 2–0. Omroep Brabant later wrote that Streppel had established the club in the upper half of the Eerste Divisie despite a limited budget.

=== Willem II ===
On 1 July 2011, Streppel became head coach of Willem II. In his first season, the club won promotion to the Eredivisie through the play-offs, beating FC Den Bosch 2–1 on aggregate in the final on 19 May 2012. Willem II finished bottom of the 2012–13 season and was relegated after a 5–0 defeat to Ajax on 4 May 2013. Streppel kept his job and also took on the role of technical manager.

Willem II won the 2013–14 Eerste Divisie with 79 points, including a run of seven consecutive wins. In January 2015, he signed a contract extension until mid-2017. Willem II finished ninth in the 2014–15 season.

On 16 March 2016, Heerenveen announced that Streppel would become its head coach from the following season on a two-year contract. Willem II general director Berry van Gool said that Streppel had made a large contribution to the professionalisation of the club. At the end of the 2015–16 season, Willem II had to enter the relegation play-offs. It beat Almere City 6–2 on aggregate and then NAC Breda 4–3 on aggregate to stay in the Eredivisie.

=== Heerenveen ===
Streppel succeeded Foppe de Haan at Heerenveen in the summer of 2016. In both of his seasons, Heerenveen reached the play-offs for European football and were knocked out in the semi-finals. In 2018, they beat FC Utrecht 4–3 at home but lost the return match 2–1. On 13 March 2018, it was announced that Streppel and Heerenveen would part ways at the end of the season. Looking back, he said that the results had not been consistent enough. He was succeeded by Jan Olde Riekerink.

=== Anorthosis Famagusta and Al Jazira ===
On 11 October 2018, Streppel was appointed manager of Cypriot club Anorthosis Famagusta on a one-year contract, replacing Rony Levi. He said that he had wanted to work abroad and experience a different culture. In February 2019, he said that he had not been paid for three months. Anorthosis finished seventh in the 2018–19 Cypriot First Division.

In June 2019, Streppel joined Al Jazira in Abu Dhabi on a one-year contract with an option to extend, succeeding his compatriot Damiën Hertog. He was the club's fourth consecutive Dutch head coach. Al Jazira dismissed him in October 2019 after three matches.

=== Roda JC ===
On 10 June 2020, Streppel was appointed head coach of Eerste Divisie club Roda JC Kerkrade. He brought his former Helmond Sport colleagues Remond Strijbosch and Rein van Duijnhoven with him as assistant coach and goalkeeping coach. In October 2021, he extended his contract until June 2024. In the 2021–22 season, Roda reached the promotion play-offs, where they lost 4–2 on aggregate to Excelsior in the quarter-finals. On 15 December 2022, Roda announced that Streppel was leaving to become technical director of Helmond Sport.

=== Akritas Chlorakas ===
On 1 September 2026, after four years in executive roles, Streppel became head coach of Cypriot second-tier club Akritas Chlorakas. The club dismissed him in October after four matches, of which he won one, drew one and lost two. Streppel later said that the relationship broke down when the club began telling him which players to select.

=== Return to Willem II ===
On 28 October 2026, Streppel returned to Willem II as head coach on a contract until the end of the season, replacing the dismissed John Stegeman. Willem II were bottom of the Eredivisie with two points from ten matches. Technical director Freek Heerkens, who had played under Streppel in Tilburg, praised him for stepping in and taking responsibility at that moment. His first match back, on 31 October, ended in a 7–0 defeat away to PSV. On 6 November, Willem II drew 1–1 at home with PEC Zwolle and remained bottom with three points.

== Executive career ==
=== Helmond Sport and Mechelen ===
Streppel returned to Helmond Sport as technical director in December 2022. In June 2025, he was also appointed director of football at KV Mechelen, Helmond Sport's Belgian sister club, to make the cooperation between the two clubs more efficient. He left Mechelen in October 2025 after about four months. According to Het Nieuwsblad, owner Philippe van Esch ended the arrangement because Streppel's responsibilities overlapped with those of technical director Tom Caluwé.

On 22 January 2026, Helmond Sport parted ways with Streppel with immediate effect, citing its finances. The club had negative equity and faced the threat of a one-point deduction from the KNVB. During his time as technical director, Helmond Sport moved into a new stadium but did not reach the promotion play-offs. Streppel said that he was leaving "with pain in my heart".

== Managerial statistics ==
As of match played 22 November 2026

Managerial record by team and tenure
| Team | Nat | From | To | Record | | | | | | | |
| Team | Nat | From | To | G | W | D | L | GF | GA | GD | Win % |
|---|---|---|---|---|---|---|---|---|---|---|---|
| Helmond Sport | (Netherlands) | 1 June 2008 | 1 July 2011 | 121 | 52 | 27 | 42 | 197 | 170 | +27 | 42.98 |
| Willem II | (Netherlands) | 1 July 2011 | 1 July 2016 | 189 | 72 | 42 | 75 | 284 | 278 | +6 | 38.10 |
| Heerenveen | (Netherlands) | 1 July 2016 | 13 May 2018 | 78 | 29 | 17 | 32 | 120 | 121 | −1 | 37.18 |
| Anorthosis Famagusta | (Cyprus) | 11 October 2018 | 31 May 2019 | 30 | 12 | 10 | 8 | 47 | 39 | +8 | 40.00 |
| Al Jazira | (United Arab Emirates) | 16 June 2019 | 11 October 2019 | 6 | 2 | 1 | 3 | 7 | 11 | −4 | 33.33 |
| Roda JC | (Netherlands) | 10 June 2020 | 16 December 2022 | 101 | 42 | 28 | 31 | 186 | 159 | +27 | 41.58 |
| Akritas Chlorakas | (Cyprus) | 1 September 2026 | 25 October 2026 | 6 | 1 | 2 | 3 | 6 | 8 | −2 | 16.67 |
| Willem II | (Netherlands) | 28 October 2026 | Present | 3 | 0 | 1 | 2 | 2 | 10 | −8 | 0.00 |
| Total | | | | 534 | 210 | 128 | 196 | 849 | 796 | +53 | 39.33 |

== Honours ==
=== Manager ===
Willem II

- Eerste Divisie: 2013–14
