= Rob Maas =

Dutch footballer and manager

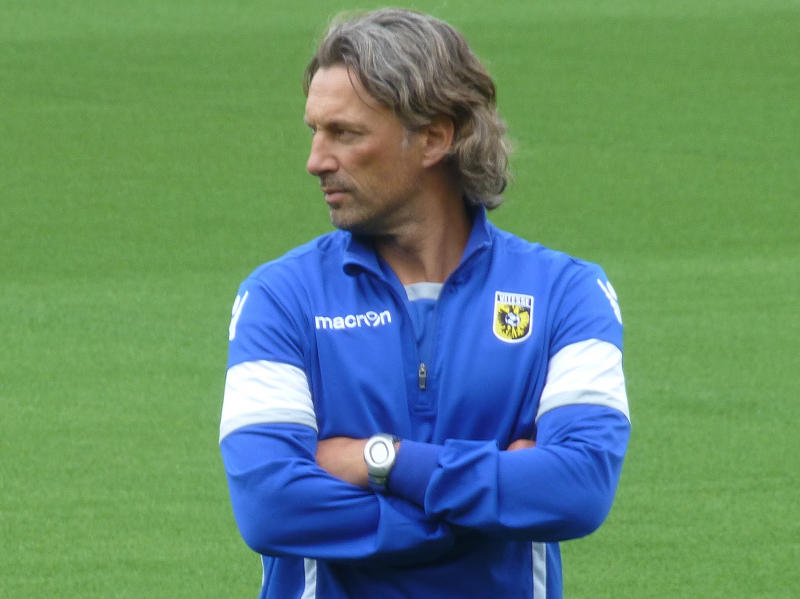
- Maas with Vitesse in 2015

Personal information
- Full name: Robertus Leonardus Adrianus Maas
- Date of birth: 17 December 1969 (age 56)
- Place of birth: Eindhoven, Netherlands
- Height: 1.81 m (5 ft 11 in)
- Position: Midfielder

Team information
- Current team: PSV (assistant)

Youth career
- VC Tuindorp
- RPC Eindhoven
- PSV

Senior career*
Years	Team	Apps	(Gls)
1989–1990	FC Eindhoven	31	(1)
1990–1993	RKC Waalwijk	89	(7)
1993–1996	Feyenoord	69	(5)
1996–1998	Arminia Bielefeld	56	(3)
1998–2003	Hertha BSC	34	(0)
2003–2005	MSV Duisburg	41	(0)
2005–2008	Heracles Almelo	83	(3)
2008–2009	RKC Waalwijk	15	(0)
Total		418	(19)

Managerial career
- 2013–2014: RKC Waalwijk (assistant)
- 2014–2016: Vitesse (assistant)
- 2016: Vitesse
- 2016: Cambuur
- 2017– 2018: Maccabi Haifa (assistant)
- 2019: Saudi Arabia U20 (assistant)
- 2020–2021: Bayer Leverkusen (assistant)
- 2021–2022: Lyon (assistant)
- 2023–: PSV (assistant)
- * Club domestic league appearances and goals

Rob Maas (born 17 December 1969) is a Dutch football manager and former player, who is an assistant coach at PSV.

== Playing career ==
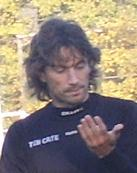
Maas with Heracles Almelo in 2007

Maas was born in Eindhoven and made his debut in professional football in the 1989–90 Eerste Divisie season when playing for FC Eindhoven. He then moved to the Eredivisie with RKC Waalwijk. In 1993, Maas transferred to Feyenoord, winning two KNVB Cups in three seasons.

Subsequently, he moved to Germany's Bundesliga, playing for Arminia Bielefeld and then Hertha BSC. Although he did not receive a lot of playing time at Hertha, he helped the club win the DFB-Ligapokal two times during his time there. In 2003, Maas moved to the 2. Bundesliga club MSV Duisburg. After two seasons, he returned to the Netherlands, helping newly promoted Heracles Almelo avoid relegation and stay in the Eredivisie. He then had a second stint at RKC Waalwijk from July 2008 until June 2009, when he retired.

== Managerial career ==
Following the departure of Peter Bosz to Maccabi Tel Aviv on 4 January 2016, Maas, who had been Bosz's assistant, was appointed interim manager of Vitesse. On 8 May 2016, the final day of the 2015–16 season, it was announced he was relieved of his duties.

On 17 June 2016, Maas was appointed manager of SC Cambuur, replacing Marcel Keizer who had left the club after their relegation to the Eerste Divisie. Four months later, on 15 October 2016, Cambuur announced that they had sacked Maas, as the club was in fourteenth position after ten league games.

== Honours ==
Feyenoord

- KNVB Cup: 1993–94, 1994–95

Hertha BSC

- DFB-Ligapokal: 2001, 2002
