= René Hake =

Dutch football manager (born 1971)

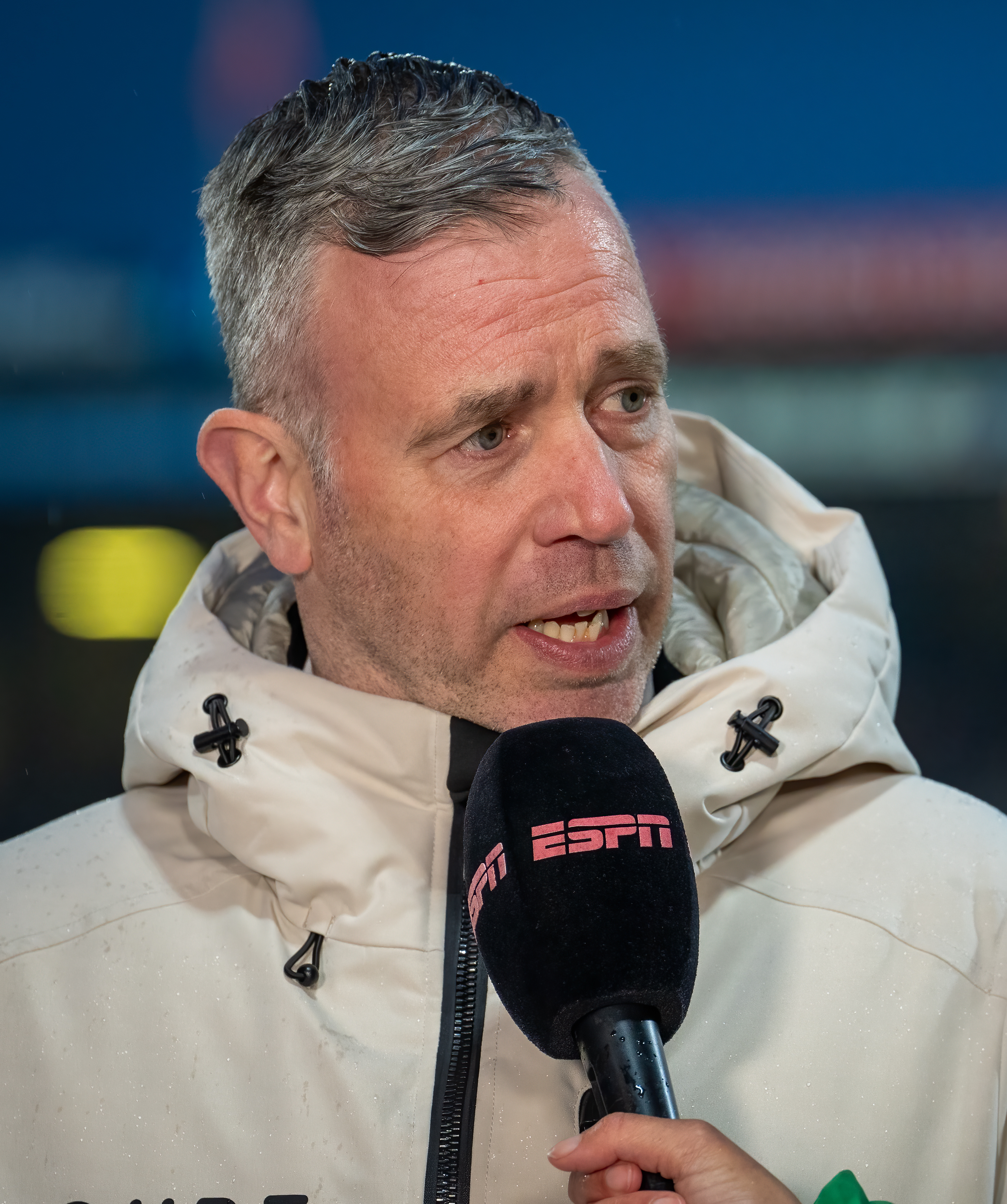
- Hake in 2024 with Go Ahead Eagles

Personal information
- Date of birth: 18 December 1971 (age 54)
- Place of birth: Coevorden, Netherlands

Youth career
- –1988: SC Oranje
- 1989–1990: Emmen

Senior career*
Years	Team	Apps	(Gls)
1988–1989	SC Oranje		

Managerial career
- 2003–2005: Emmen (U19)
- 2005–2009: Twente (U19)
- 2009–2010: Twente (U21)
- 2010–2012: Emmen
- 2012–2015: Zwolle (assistant)
- 2015: Twente (assistant)
- 2015–2017: Twente
- 2018–2019: Cambuur
- 2019–2020: Jong Utrecht
- 2020–2022: Utrecht
- 2022–2024: Go Ahead Eagles
- 2024: Manchester United (assistant)
- 2025–2026: Feyenoord (assistant)
- * Club domestic league appearances and goals

René Hake (born 18 December 1971) is a Dutch professional football coach and former player who was most recently an assistant manager at Eredivisie club Feyenoord.

== Playing career ==
Raised in Schoonebeek, Drenthe, Hake began his football career at local amateur side SC Oranje where he played in the first team at the age of 17. He later played in the A-juniors (youth team) at Emmen, but was unable to make the step up to the first team. He then went on to study at the CIOS in Heerenveen, Friesland, an educational institution that provides vocational training in sports and physical education.

== Coaching career ==
=== Emmen and Twente ===
After completing his studies, Hake spent eleven years working in the youth department at Emmen before moving to the joined youth academy Twente/Heracles Almelo. At the academy, he served as head of youth development and coach of the under-19 team. Hake was the coach of the under-19 team when they won the national championship and Super Cup for U19s in 2007. He also earned his coaching diploma during this period.

In 2009, Hake was appointed head coach of the reserve team of Twente, succeeding Cees Lok. He was later appointed for the position of head coach at Emmen, and signed a contract until 2014 with the club in on 11 October 2010. Following his appointment, Emmen started achieving positive results, going nine games unbeaten after his debut as head coach.

=== PEC and return to Twente ===
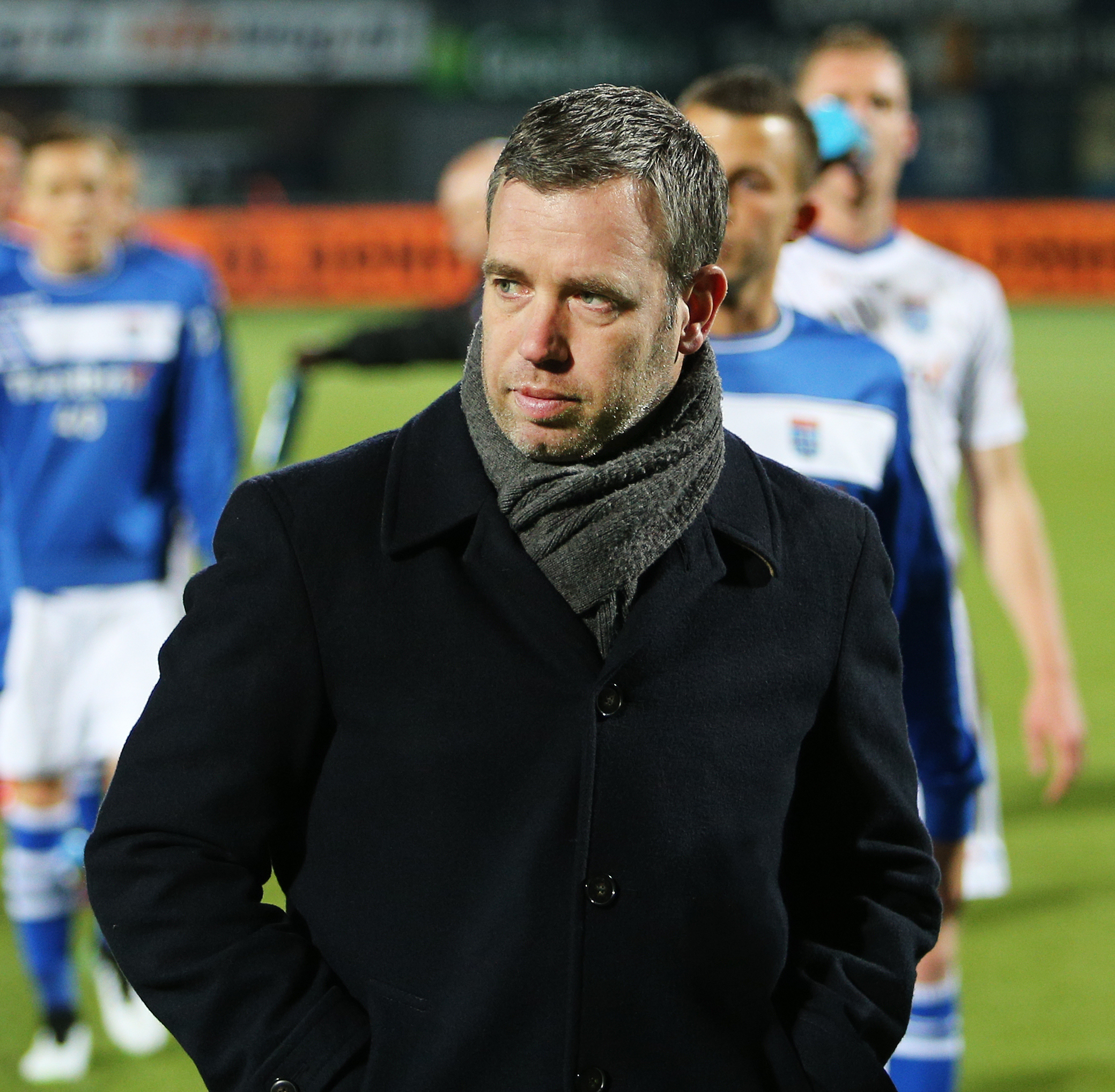
Hake managing Zwolle in 2015

Hake's contract with Emmen was terminated prematurely in April 2012, and he signed a two-year contract with PEC Zwolle as an assistant coach under Ron Jans in June of that year. He extended his contract with the club for two more years in March 2014.

In June 2015, Hake returned to Twente as an assistant coach, signing a three-year contract. He became interim head coach of Twente on 30 August 2015, following the dismissal of Alfred Schreuder. A month and a half later, he was appointed head coach permanently. Although the team struggled due to financial problems, they finished in the 13th position in the 2015–16 campaign. In the second season, the team improved under Hake's leadership and finished seventh in the Eredivisie. However, the team lost many games in the last part of the season, and Hake was dismissed as head coach when Twente began the 2017–18 season with six losses in their first eight games.

=== Cambuur and Utrecht ===
On 31 January 2018, Hake was appointed as the new head coach of Cambuur, replacing assistant coaches Jan Bruin and Sipke Hulshoff and signing a one-and-a-half-year contract. In March 2019, the club announced that they would not renew his contract. He then signed a three-year contract with Utrecht to become head coach of their reserve team Jong Utrecht, which played in the Eerste Divisie.

After the departure of head coach John van den Brom, Hake was given the opportunity to prove himself as the new head coach of Utrecht starting from 6 November 2020. On 31 December 2020, it was announced that Hake had signed a one-and-a-half-year contract as head coach of Utrecht. He was dismissed on 22 March 2022.

=== Go Ahead Eagles ===
On 9 May 2022, it was announced that Hake would become the new head coach of Go Ahead Eagles from 1 July 2022, with him signing a three-year contract.

=== Manchester United ===
In early July 2024, it was reported that Hake would join the coaching staff of Erik ten Hag at Manchester United as an assistant. Following a coaching staff overhaul, Hake left his role at United on 11 November 2024.

== Manager profile ==
Hake is known for his flexible tactical approach. He has experience in managing teams that play possession-based football, as well as teams that focus on quick transitions and counter-attacking.

He has been compared to Erik ten Hag, with both managers having a focus on compact, defensive structures. They share the same football vision, which they learned while in the youth department of Twente. The two also share a training principle that requires all players to be involved in both attacking and defensive play.

== Managerial statistics ==
As of match played 26 May 2024

Managerial record by club and tenure
Team	From	To	Record							
Team	From	To	M	W	D	L	GF	GA	GD	Win %
Emmen	18 October 2010	30 June 2012	60	13	13	34	60	120	−60	21.67
Twente	30 August 2015	18 October 2017	75	27	15	33	108	123	−15	36.00
Cambuur	31 January 2018	30 June 2019	63	28	17	18	108	89	+19	44.44
Jong Utrecht	1 July 2019	7 November 2020	38	13	8	17	62	67	−5	34.21
Utrecht	7 November 2020	22 March 2022	60	24	18	18	100	79	+21	40.00
Go Ahead Eagles	9 May 2022	6 July 2024	76	28	20	28	113	110	+3	36.84
Total			372	133	91	148	551	588	−37	35.75
