= Alfons Groenendijk =

Dutch footballer and manager (born 1964)

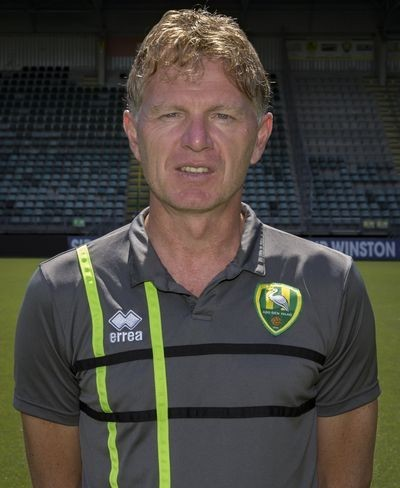
- Groenendijk with ADO Den Haag in 2017

Personal information
- Date of birth: 17 May 1964 (age 62)
- Place of birth: Leiden, Netherlands
- Height: 1.82 m (6 ft 0 in)
- Position: Midfielder

Youth career
- 1972–1976: LFC
- 1976–1982: UVS

Senior career*
Years	Team	Apps	(Gls)
1982–1987	FC Den Haag	117	(22)
1987–1991	Roda JC	107	(20)
1991–1993	Ajax	22	(1)
1993–1994	Manchester City	9	(0)
1994–1998	Sparta	105	(11)
1998–2001	Utrecht	51	(7)
Total		411	(61)

Managerial career
- 2001–2003: Katwijk
- 2009–2010: Willem II
- 2010–2012: Den Bosch
- 2013–2014: Jong Ajax
- 2015–2016: Excelsior
- 2017–2019: ADO Den Haag
- 2024–2025: Jong PSV
- * Club domestic league appearances and goals

Alfons Groenendijk (Dutch pronunciation: [ˈɑlfɔns ˈxrunə(n)dɛik]; (Note: In isolation, Groenendijk is pronounced [ˈɣrunə(n)dɛik].) born 17 May 1964) Dutch professional football manager and former player.

== Playing career ==
Groenendijk played for hometown clubs LFC and UVS before signing professionally for FC Den Haag. He also played for Roda JC, Ajax, Manchester City, Sparta Rotterdam and Utrecht. With Ajax, he won the 1991–92 UEFA Cup and the 1992–93 KNVB Cup.

== Managerial career ==
Groenendijk was appointed assistant manager of Willem II for the 2008–09 season. He was previously a manager of Jong Ajax and the amateur side VV Katwijk. He became manager of Willem II in February 2009, succeeding Andries Jonker, who became director of football for Willem II. On 19 February 2010, Willem II decided to sack Groenendijk. In 2015 he preferred Excelsior over former club Roda JC. He was appointed manager of ADO Den Haag in February 2017.

He left Jong PSV in summer 2025.

== Honours ==
Ajax

- KNVB Cup: 1993
- UEFA Cup: 1991–92

FC Den Haag

- Eerste Divisie: 1986
