= Quick (sportswear) =

Dutch manufacturer of sportswear

Quick is a Dutch manufacturer of sportswear. In 1905, Quick was founded in Hengelo, Gelderland, and started the production of athletic shoes for many sports. Quick provided the official running shoes for the Olympic Games of 1928 in Amsterdam. Although tennis, hockey, cycling, and indoor sports were very important, the brand became most famous for its football boots. Quick expanded in the 1950s, 1960s and 1970s, but declined in the 1980s and stopped production in 1992.

== New start ==
After ten years of absence, Quick was relaunched in 2001. Whereas the brand formerly produced functional sportswear, the emphasis now lies on sneakers and apparel that are worn as retro-fashion. Many of the old models from before 1992 have once again been taken into production.

In 2005, Quick celebrated its 100-year anniversary and published an anniversary-book that describes the history of the brand.

Quick supplied the team wear for the Dutch club side AZ Alkmaar. Today, after a short hiatus, Quick had dress SC Cambuur (until the 2018/19 season) in Eredivisie, and in this lost period had wear De Graafschap and Excelsior (starting in the 2015/16 season) of the Eerste Divisie for two seasons, and many other teams in Dutch amateur football and are also partners of the BFC Selectie.
