= John Stegeman =

Dutch footballer and manager (born 1976)

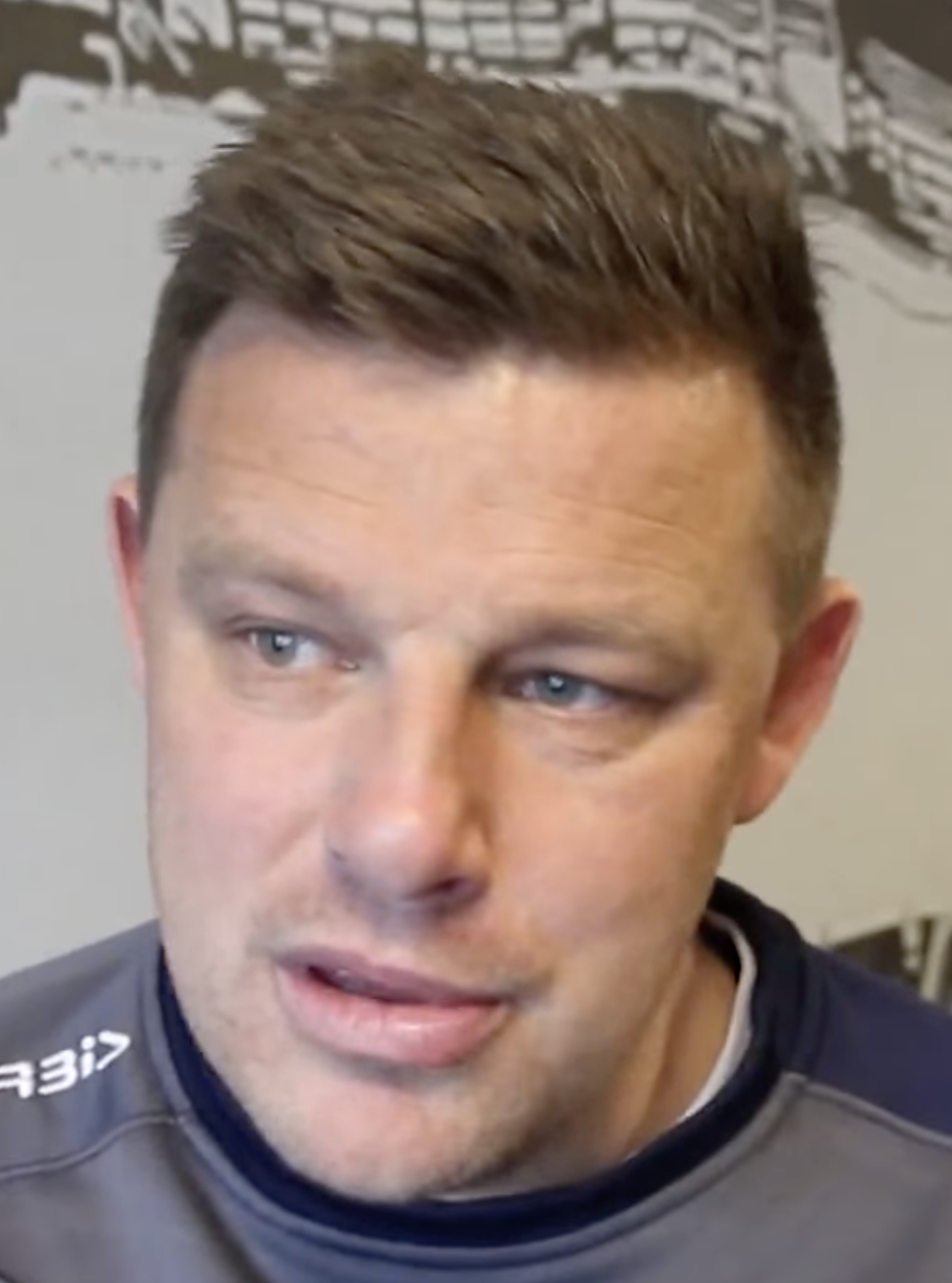
- Stegeman in 2018

Personal information
- Date of birth: 27 August 1976 (age 50)
- Place of birth: Epe, Netherlands
- Height: 1.82 m (6 ft 0 in)
- Position: Centre-forward

Senior career*
Years	Team	Apps	(Gls)
1995–1997	Vitesse	7	(0)
1996–1997	→ Helmond Sport (loan)	16	(7)
1997–2000	Go Ahead Eagles	86	(19)
2002–2004	Heracles Almelo	56	(13)
2004–2005	AGOVV Apeldoorn	38	(5)
2005–2007	Cambuur Leeuwarden	43	(3)
2007–2008	WHC Wezep		
2008–2010	SV Epe		

Managerial career
- 2008–2014: Heracles Almelo (assistant)
- 2014–2018: Heracles Almelo
- 2018–2019: Go Ahead Eagles
- 2019–2021: PEC Zwolle
- 2022–2025: Antwerp (assistant)
- 2025–2026: Willem II
- * Club domestic league appearances and goals

John Stegeman (born 27 August 1976) is a Dutch professional football manager and former footballer who was the manager of Eredivisie club Willem II.

== Playing career ==
During his footballing career, Stegeman played as a centre-forward in the Dutch Eerste Divisie, except for his debut season with Vitesse, which was in the Eredivisie. He made his debut for Vitesse on 30 March 1996 in an away match against Fortuna Sittard. After making six additional appearances during the season, he was loaned to Helmond Sport in the summer of 1996. After being released by Vitesse a year later, he played for Go Ahead Eagles, Heracles Almelo, AGOVV Apeldoorn and Cambuur Leeuwarden. In the summer of 2007, he retired from professional football.

== Managerial career ==
Stegeman joined the technical staff of Heracles in June 2008. On 31 August 2014 the then head coach of Heracles, Jan de Jonge, was fired. Stegeman was temporarily appointed as head coach together with René Kolmschot. On 17 September 2014 this appointment was made permanent until the end of the season. At the end of the 2017–18 season Stegemans and Heracles decided to part ways.

Stegemans became the head coach of Go Ahead Eagles at the start of the 2018-19 season.

On 29 May, after just missing promotion to the Eredivisie, Stegeman announced he was leaving Go Ahead Eagles to join their rivals PEC Zwolle. After disappointing results, including a 3–2 defeat against relegation candidate FC Emmen, Stegeman was dismissed by the club management on 20 February 2021.

Before the 2025–26 season, Stegeman signed a two-season contract with Willem II. After a run of bad results he was sacked in October 2026.

== Personal life ==
On 5 September 2019, Stegeman was involved in a solo traffic accident with his blood alcohol content three times the legal limit.
