= Marcel Keizer =

Dutch football player and coach (born 1969)

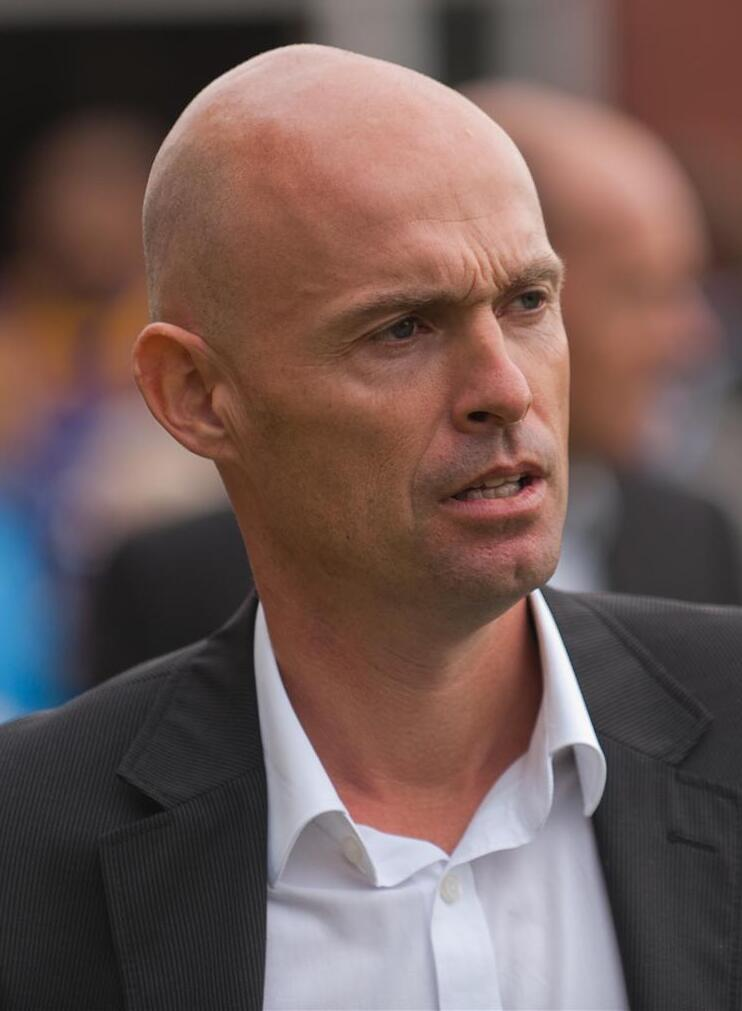
- Keizer as manager of VVSB in 2011

Personal information
- Full name: Marcel Keizer
- Date of birth: 15 January 1969 (age 57)
- Place of birth: Badhoevedorp, Netherlands
- Height: 1.82 m (6 ft 0 in)
- Position: Midfielder

Senior career*
Years	Team	Apps	(Gls)
1987–1989	Ajax	4	(0)
1989–1998	Cambuur	282	(34)
1998–2000	De Graafschap	9	(0)
2000–2002	Emmen	34	(1)

Managerial career
- 2007–2011: Argon
- 2011–2012: VVSB
- 2012–2014: Telstar
- 2015–2016: Emmen
- 2016: Cambuur
- 2016–2017: Jong Ajax
- 2017: Ajax
- 2018: Al Jazira
- 2018–2019: Sporting CP
- 2019–2023: Al Jazira
- 2023: Al Shabab
- * Club domestic league appearances and goals

Marcel Keizer (born 15 January 1969) is a Dutch football coach and former player who was most recently the manager of Saudi Pro League side Al Shabab.

His playing career as a midfielder began at Ajax and was mainly spent at Cambuur, and he had brief spells managing both clubs. He won a Taça da Liga and Taça de Portugal in 2019 at Sporting CP, and had two spells at Al Jazira, winning the UAE Pro League in 2021.

== Coaching career ==
Keizer was technical coach of Eerste Divisie side Emmen. He was also the coach of Telstar for two seasons and took the reins at Cambuur in February 2016. In June 2016, he left Cambuur and became coach of Jong Ajax.

On 17 June 2017, Keizer became the new coach of Ajax on a two-year contract, after managing the youth side in the previous season, thus replacing the Borussia Dortmund-bound Peter Bosz. After 17 games, Ajax were second in the Eredivisie, ranking with five points behind the leaders PSV, and Keizer was fired on 21 December 2017, after losing a cup match on penalties against Twente.

He received his first foreign job on 2 June 2018, replacing retired compatriot Henk ten Cate at Al Jazira Club of the UAE Pro-League. On 8 November the same year, he was allowed to resign to take the job at Sporting CP, with his club unbeaten and in second place at the time.

Keizer signed for the Lisbon-based club on a contract until 2021. On his debut on 24 November, they won 4–1 against Lusitano in the fourth round of the Taça de Portugal, and in his first Primeira Liga match on 3 December, the club won 3–1 against Rio Ave. Sporting completed a cup double in Keizer's first season, seizing both the Taça da Liga and Taça de Portugal in penalty shootout wins against Porto. He was the first foreign manager to win the latter tournament since fellow Dutchman Co Adriaanse of Porto in 2006. He left Sporting on 3 September 2019.

On 13 October 2019, Keizer returned to Al Jazira on a two-year contract, after compatriot Jurgen Streppel left the Abu Dhabi-based club. On 11 May 2021, he led the club to their third league title after beating Khor Fakkan 3–1; it was his first league title in his career. Keizer would enter 2022 with a successful 5–3 victory on penalty shootout against Shabab Al Ahli and clinching Al Jazira their first super cup title.

On 27 July 2023, Keizer was appointed as manager of Saudi Pro League side Al Shabab. On 6 September 2023, it was announced that Keizer and Al-Shabab agreed to end his contract mutually.

== Managerial statistics ==
As of match played 22 May 2023

Managerial record by team and tenure
Team	Nat	From	To	Record							
Team	Nat	From	To	G	W	D	L	GF	GA	GD	Win %
Telstar	(Netherlands)	1 July 2012	1 May 2014	71	21	15	35	87	130	−43	29.58
FC Emmen	(Netherlands)	1 July 2015	14 February 2016	26	12	4	10	44	41	+3	46.15
SC Cambuur	(Netherlands)	15 February 2016	2 June 2016	11	1	2	8	9	24	−15	9.09
Jong Ajax	(Netherlands)	2 June 2016	17 June 2017	38	23	7	8	93	54	+39	60.53
Ajax	(Netherlands)	17 June 2017	21 December 2017	24	14	5	5	66	26	+40	58.33
Al Jazira	(United Arab Emirates)	2 June 2018	9 November 2018	13	7	5	1	31	20	+11	53.85
Sporting CP	(Portugal)	12 November 2018	3 September 2019	42	25	9	8	93	47	+46	59.52
Al Jazira	(United Arab Emirates)	13 October 2019	26 May 2023	124	68	23	33	231	157	+74	54.84
Al Shabab	(Saudi Arabia)	27 July 2023	6 September 2023	9	2	3	4	7	15	−8	22.22
Total				358	173	73	112	662	514	+148	48.32

== Honours ==
Sporting CP

- Taça de Portugal: 2018–19
- Taça da Liga: 2018–19

Al Jazira

- UAE Pro League: 2020–21
- UAE Super Cup: 2021
