= Dirk Schermerhorn =

Dutch engineer (1900–1937)

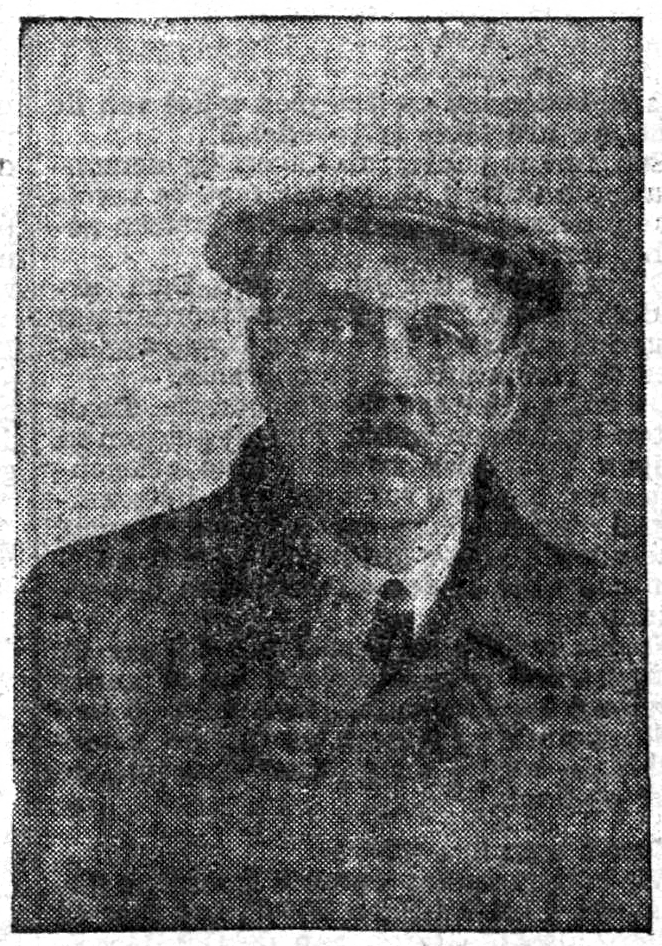
- Dirk Schermerhorn in 1934
- Born: 26 April 1900; Zuid- en Noord-Schermer, Netherlands
- Died: 26 November 1937 (aged 37); Soviet Union
- Education: Technische Hoogeschool van Delft
- Occupation: Engineer
- Spouse: Francisca Johanna Mus (m. 1924)
- Children: 3
- Family: Willem Schermerhorn (brother)

Dirk Schermerhorn (26 April 1900 – 26 November 1937 or 1941) was a Dutch engineer. In 1924, Schermerhorn moved to the Soviet Union to work on building up the country's industrial sector, where he became the first Dutch victim of the Great Purge. He was a younger brother of Dutch prime minister Willem Schermerhorn.

== Biography ==
Schermerhorn was born in Zuid- en Noord-Schermer as the son of Teunis Schermerhorn and Trijntje Honig. He was the youngest brother of Willem Schermerhorn, the first Prime Minister of the Netherlands after World War II. Around 1921, Dirk Schermerhorn became a communist, going against the family tradition of liberalism, though he would remain close to his family.

In 1924, he obtained his degree in civil engineering from the Technical College of Delft (today known as the Delft University of Technology). That same year, he married Francisca Johanna Mus, a dentist, with whom he would have three children. He subsequently left for the Soviet Union to help build up the industry there, where he worked at the Kuzbass Autonomous Industrial Colony for a year, before spending the winter of 1925 and 1926 in the Netherlands. In 1927, he gave a lecture for the "Practische Studie" society in Delft on the industrial development of the Kuznetsk coal basin in Siberia. In 1929, he gave a lecture for the Genootschap Nederland-Nieuw-Rusland.

Upon his return to the Soviet Union in 1926, Schermerhorn was assigned to the construction of the Turkestan–Siberia Railway, one of the largest projects of the first five-year plan, settling in Semipalatinsk where he worked in the technical office drawing bridges and roads, eventually becoming the director of the graphic works department, and where his son Timofej was born. In 1929, Schermerhorn moved to Alma-Ata, where he became director of the construction effort, which finished construction in 1930. He was awarded the Order of the Red Banner of Labour that same year. In 1932, Schermerhorn and his family visited the Netherlands for the last time.

He participated in the construction of the Moscow Metro between 1931 and 1935. Lazar Kaganovich, a member of the Politburo and Schermerhorn's direct superior, held Schermerhorn responsible for an accident in the Moscow Metro, and on 14 October 1936 Schermerhorn became the first Dutch person to be arrested during the Great Purge. It was assumed that there was dissatisfaction with Schermerhorn because his actions had delayed the completion of the metro by several weeks, preventing it from opening on 7 November 1936, the anniversary of the October Revolution. When his brother Willem Schermerhorn visited Francisca and his children in Moscow that same year, he was told Dirk was absent on a business trip.

On 26 November 1937, he was convicted of espionage and economic sabotage, among other charges. He was likely executed immediately thereafter, though fellow Dutch engineer Thijs Wiessing reported seeing Schermerhorn alive in prison in 1938, and other sources indicate he died in 1941 at an unknown location. In 1938, his widow Francisca Schermerhorn was arrested as the wife of an "enemy of the people", after which her three children were sent to an orphanage in Ukraine.

Nikita Khrushchev, who had also been involved in the construction of the Moscow Metro, rehabilitated Schermerhorn in 1956. Francisca Schermerhorn, who died in 1953 in exile in Mordovia after being freed in 1945, was rehabilitated in 1958. His son Timofej Dimitrevich Shermergor later became a noted physicist.
