= André Krul =

Dutch footballer

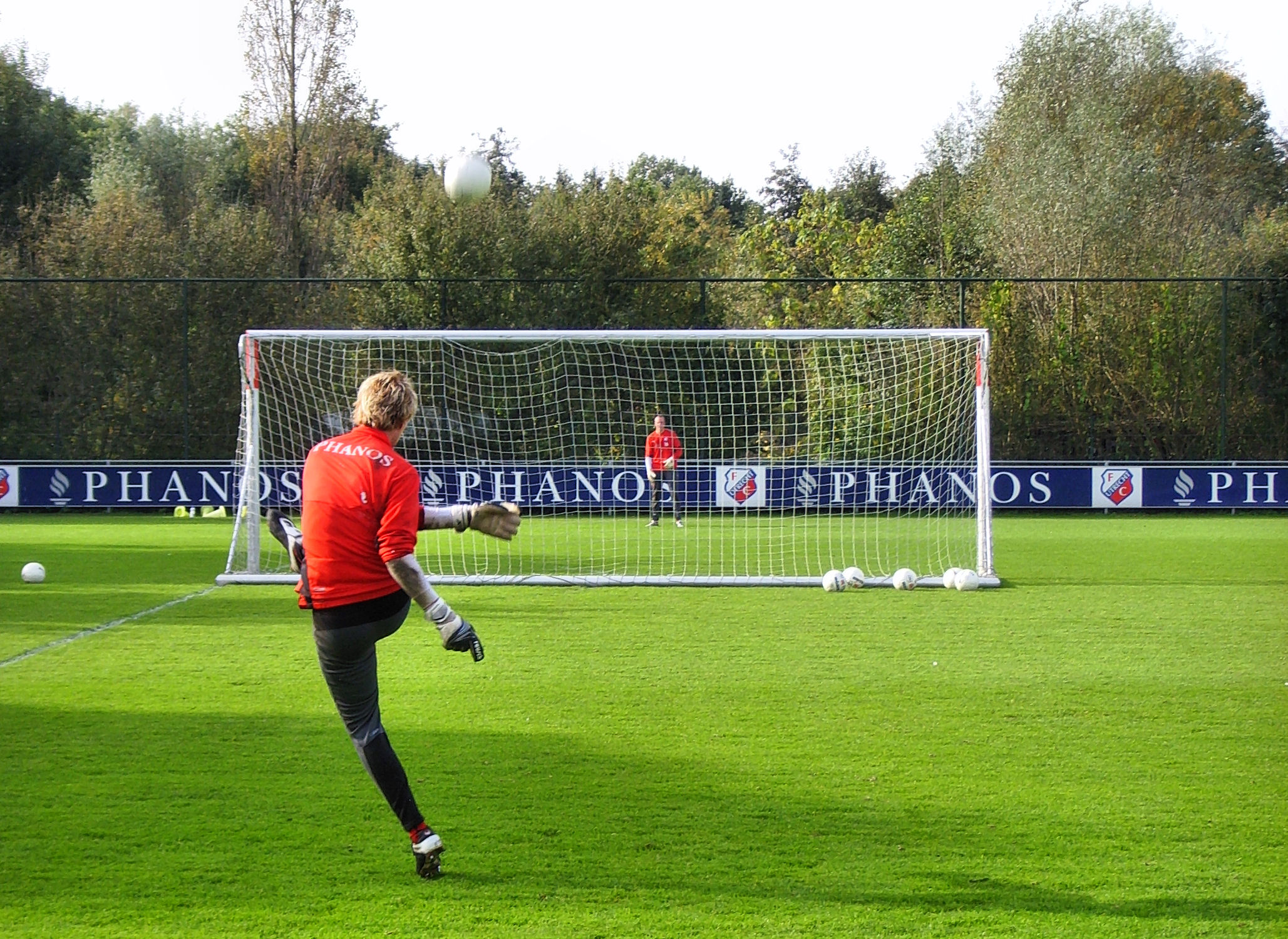
- Krul training for Utrecht in 2008

Personal information
- Date of birth: 8 May 1987 (age 39)
- Place of birth: Grootschermer, Netherlands
- Height: 1.85 m (6 ft 1 in)
- Position: Goalkeeper

Team information
- Current team: AJEL de Rufisque

Youth career
- 2000–2002: AZ
- 2002–2006: AFC '34
- 2006–2007: Utrecht

Senior career*
Years	Team	Apps	(Gls)
2007–2008	Jong Utrecht	0	(0)
2008–2012	Utrecht	0	(0)
2009–2010	→ Telstar (loan)	19	(0)
2010–2011	→ Sparta Rotterdam (loan)	20	(0)
2011–2012	→ AGOVV Apeldoorn (loan)	26	(0)
2012	Valletta	0	(0)
2012–2013	Boyacá Chico	14	(0)
2014	Jong Groningen	1	(0)
2014	Bayamón FC	0	(0)
2015	Turnhout	12	(0)
2015–2016	Cambuur	0	(0)
2016	Iwaki FC	12	(0)
2017	SV Spakenburg	14	(0)
2018	Preston Lions	3	(0)
2018–2019	Jong Ajax	0	(0)
2019–2020	Alemannia Aachen	1	(0)
2020–2021	Jong AZ	0	(0)
2020–2021	AZ	0	(0)
2021–2022	Katwijk	7	(0)
2022–2022	Glacis United	3	(0)
2022–2022	Mtibwa Sugar F.C.	0	(0)
2024–	AJEL de Rufisque		

International career
	Netherlands U-21	2	(0)
- * Club domestic league appearances and goals as of 27 November 2022

André Krul (born 8 May 1987) is a Dutch professional footballer who plays as a goalkeeper for AJEL de Rufisque. Besides the Netherlands, he has played in Colombia, Puerto Rico, Belgium, Japan, Australia, Germany, Gibraltar and Senegal, making him the second football player, after Lutz Pfannenstiel to have played on six different continents.

== Club career ==
=== Youth ===
Born in Grootschermer, Krul started his career playing in AZ Alkmaar, AFC '34 and FC Utrecht's youth teams.

=== Utrecht and loans ===
Krul signed a professional contract with FC Utrecht in 2008, but made no appearance all the season. Krul was loaned to Eerste Divisie club SC Telstar for the 2009–10 season. He debuted in the 2–2 draw against SBV Excelsior. He made a total of 19 appearances in the season.

Krul returned to FC Utrecht in 2010. He was called in July 2010 for two UEFA Europa League matches, against Albanian club KF Tirana, but he remained on the bench. In August 2010, he was loaned to Sparta Rotterdam, where he made a total of 21 appearances.

For the 2011–12 season, Krul was loaned to Eerste Divisie club AGOVV Apeldoorn.

=== Abroad in Malta, Colombia and Belgium ===
After a season with the club, Krul was sold to Maltese club Valletta F.C., where he made four appearances in the UEFA Champions League, two matches against the Andorran club FC Lusitanos and the Serbian club FK Partizan.

With only a month in the club, Krul was sold to Colombian club Boyacá Chico. Krul debuted on 27 September 2012 in the 0–1 win against Millonarios.

He remained at the club until January 2014 when he was sold to Deportivo Pasto.

On 11 February 2014, AFC '34 announced André Krul as the new goalkeeper coach, after Bob Beentjes left the team. Having left Deportivo Pasto on 28 February, Krul accepted an offer from FC Groningen in March despite offers from Puerto Rican club Bayamón FC and Spanish club Arroyo. After signing with Groningen he stepped down as goalkeeper coach at AFC '34 with Beentjes returning in June.

Krul accepted a new offer of Bayamón in June 2014.

=== Return to the Netherlands ===
On 13 March 2021, he agreed to join Katwijk in the third-tier Tweede Divisie for the 2021–22 season.

=== Africa ===
Krul signed a one-and-a-half-year contract with Tanzanian Premier League side Mtibwa Sugar F.C. in January 2024 but the club did not register him with the league in time to make an appearance. He joined Senegalese club AJEL de Rufisque in September. If here were to play for AJEL de Rufisque, Africa would be the sixth continent after North America, South America, Europe, Asia and Oceania where Krul has played.

== Career statistics ==
Appearances and goals by club, season and competition
Club	Season	League			Cup		Continental		Other		Total	
Club	Season	Division	Apps	Goals	Apps	Goals	Apps	Goals	Apps	Goals	Apps	Goals
Utrecht	2008–09	Eredivisie	0	0	0	0	0	0	0	0	0	0
Utrecht	2010–11	Eredivisie	0	0	0	0	0	0	0	0	0	0
Utrecht	Total		0	0	0	0	0	0	0	0	0	0
Telstar (loan)	2009–10	Eerste Divisie	19	0	1	0	0	0	0	0	20	0
Sparta Rotterdam (loan)	2010–11	Eerste Divisie	20	0	1	0	0	0	0	0	21	0
AGOVV Apeldoorn (loan)	2011–12	Eerste Divisie	26	0	1	0	0	0	0	0	27	0
Valletta	2012–13	Maltese Premier League	0	0	0	0	4	0	0	0	4	0
Boyacá Chicó	2012	Categoría Primera A	1	0	1	0	0	0	0	0	2	0
Boyacá Chicó	2013	Categoría Primera A	13	0	3	0	0	0	0	0	16	0
Boyacá Chicó	Total		14	0	4	0	0	0	0	0	18	0
Deportivo Pasto	2014	Categoría Primera A	0	0	0	0	0	0	0	0	0	0
Groningen	2013–14	Eredivisie	0	0	0	0	0	0	0	0	0	0
Bayamón FC	2014		0	0	0	0	1	0	0	0	1	0
Turnhout	2014–15	Belgian Third Division	12	0	0	0	0	0	0	0	12	0
Cambuur	2015–16	Eredivisie	0	0	0	0	0	0	0	0	0	0
SV Spakenburg	2016–17	Tweede Divisie	14	0	0	0	0	0	4	0	18	0
Career total			105	0	7	0	5	0	4	0	121	0

== See also ==
- Journeyman (sports)
