= Willem Schermerhorn =

Prime Minister of the Netherlands from 1945 to 1946

His Excellency Willem Schermerhorn
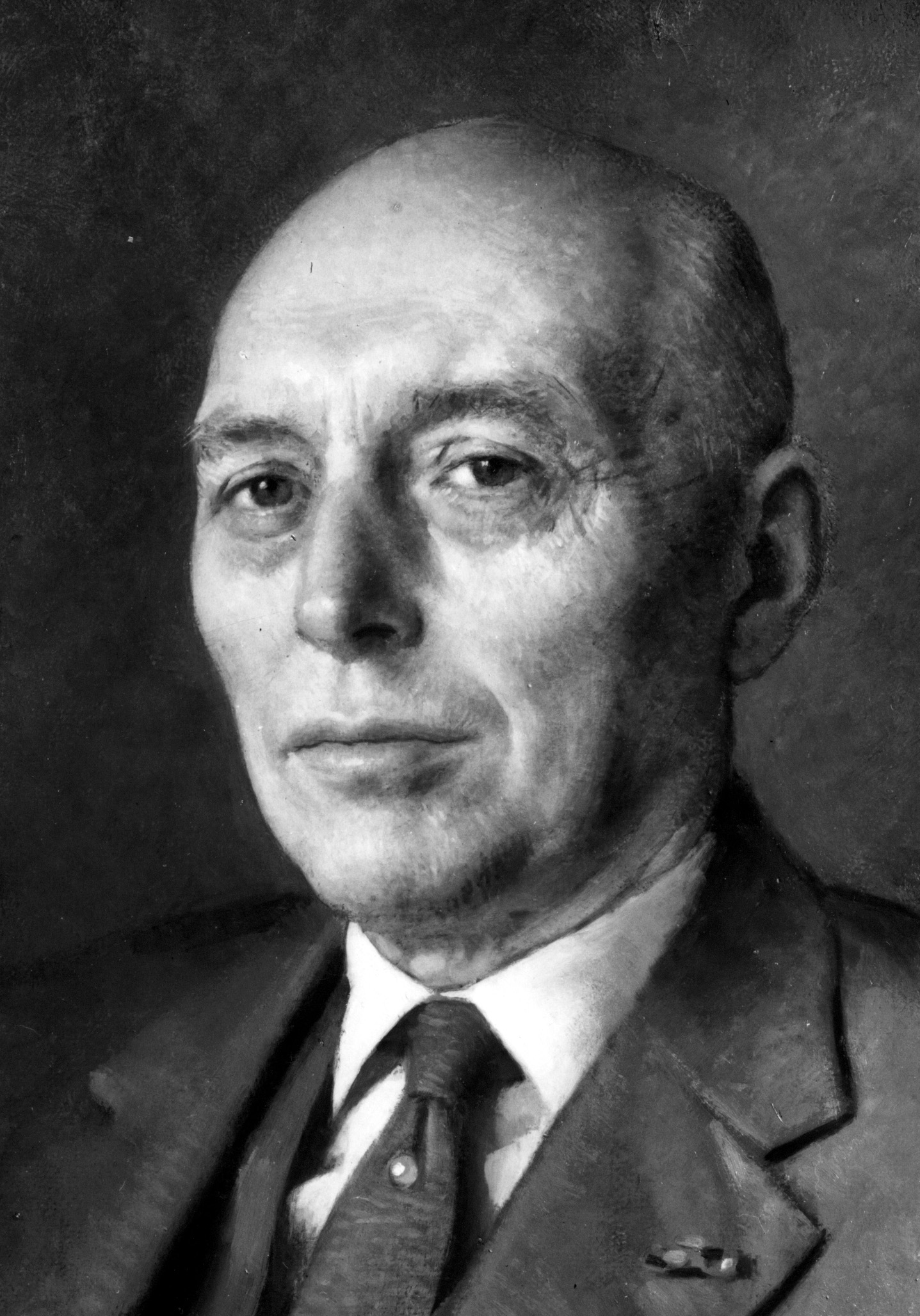
- Schermerhorn in 1946

Prime Minister of the Netherlands
- In office 25 June 1945 – 3 July 1946
- Monarch: Wilhelmina
- Deputy: Willem Drees
- Preceded by: Pieter Sjoerds Gerbrandy
- Succeeded by: Louis Beel

Member of the Senate
- In office 18 September 1951 – 5 June 1963

Member of the House of Representatives
- In office 27 July 1948 – 18 September 1951
- In office 4 June 1946 – 16 September 1946

Personal details
- Born: 17 December 1894 Akersloot, Netherlands
- Died: 10 March 1977 (aged 82) Haarlem, Netherlands
- Party: Labour Party (from 1946)
- Other political affiliations: Free-thinking Democratic League (1930–1946); Liberal State Party (1922–1930)
- Spouse: Barbara Rook (m. 1919)
- Children: 3 sons and 1 daughter
- Education: Institute of Technology (Bachelor of Engineering, Master of Engineering)
- Occupation: Politician; civil servant; civil engineer; cartographer; surveyor; researcher; editor; Author; professor

Willem "Wim" Schermerhorn (Dutch pronunciation: [ˈʋɪ(lə)m ˈsxɛrmərˌɦɔr(ə)n]; 17 December 1894 – 10 March 1977) was a Dutch politician who served as Prime Minister of the Netherlands from 25 June 1945 until 3 July 1946. He was a member of the Free-thinking Democratic League (VDB) and later co-founder of the Labour Party (PvdA). According to Harry W. Laidler, the government under Schermerhorn's premiership "achieved important results in the fields of labor, finance, housing, old age pensions, and the social services".

== Early life ==
Willem Schermerhorn was born on 17 December 1894 in Akersloot in the Dutch province of North Holland. He grew up in a Protestant family of farmers. He became professor of land surveying and geodesy at the Delft University of Technology on 7 September 1926. He was a leader in photogrammetry and founder of the International Training Centre for Aerial Survey. The International Society for Photogrammetry and Remote Sensing has offers an award in memory of Schermerhorn.

Schermerhorn remained professor until 1944, when he was removed by the German occupational forces because of his activities in the Dutch resistance. He was interned by the German occupational forces as a hostage in Kamp Sint-Michielsgestel from May 1942 until December 1943. After he was removed as professor in 1944 Schermerhorn went into hiding to avoid being taken prisoner by the German occupational forces.

== Politics ==
On 24 June 1945 he became Prime Minister of the Schermerhorn–Drees cabinet, the first cabinet after World War II. Schermerhorn was the first Dutch Prime Minister who appointed civil servants with a political background, people like Koos Vorrink and Hendrik Brugmans (nicknamed "The Schermerboys"). After the elections of 1946 he became a member of parliament, as a member of the social democratic Labour Party. He remained a member of parliament until 1951. After his parliamentarian career ended he became director of the International Training Center for Aerial Survey in 1951 (until 1969). In 1956 he became a member of the Royal Netherlands Academy of Arts and Sciences.

== Personal life ==
On 9 April 1919, Schermerhorn married Barbara Rook (13 June 1897 – 7 January 1986). Wim Schermerhorn died on 10 March 1977 in Haarlem. He was 82.

His brother, Dirk Schermerhorn, was an engineer in the Soviet Union (he was involved in the construction of the Moscow Subway). He was killed during the Stalinist purges in 1937. His sister, Neeltje, was married to theologian Johannes Marie de Jonge, principal of the Theological Seminary of the Dutch Reformed Church in Driebergen (1960–1968).

== Decorations ==
Honours
| Ribbon bar | Honour | Country | Date | Comment |
|---|---|---|---|---|
| | Knight of the Order of the Netherlands Lion | Netherlands | 1933 | |
| | Grand Officer of the Order of Orange-Nassau | Netherlands | 31 July 1946 | |

Political offices
| Preceded by Pieter Sjoerds Gerbrandy | Prime Minister of the Netherlands; 1945–1946 | Succeeded by Louis Beel |
| Preceded by Pieter Sjoerds Gerbrandy | Minister of General Warfare; 1945–1946 | Office discontinued |
