= Zuidschermer =

- Village
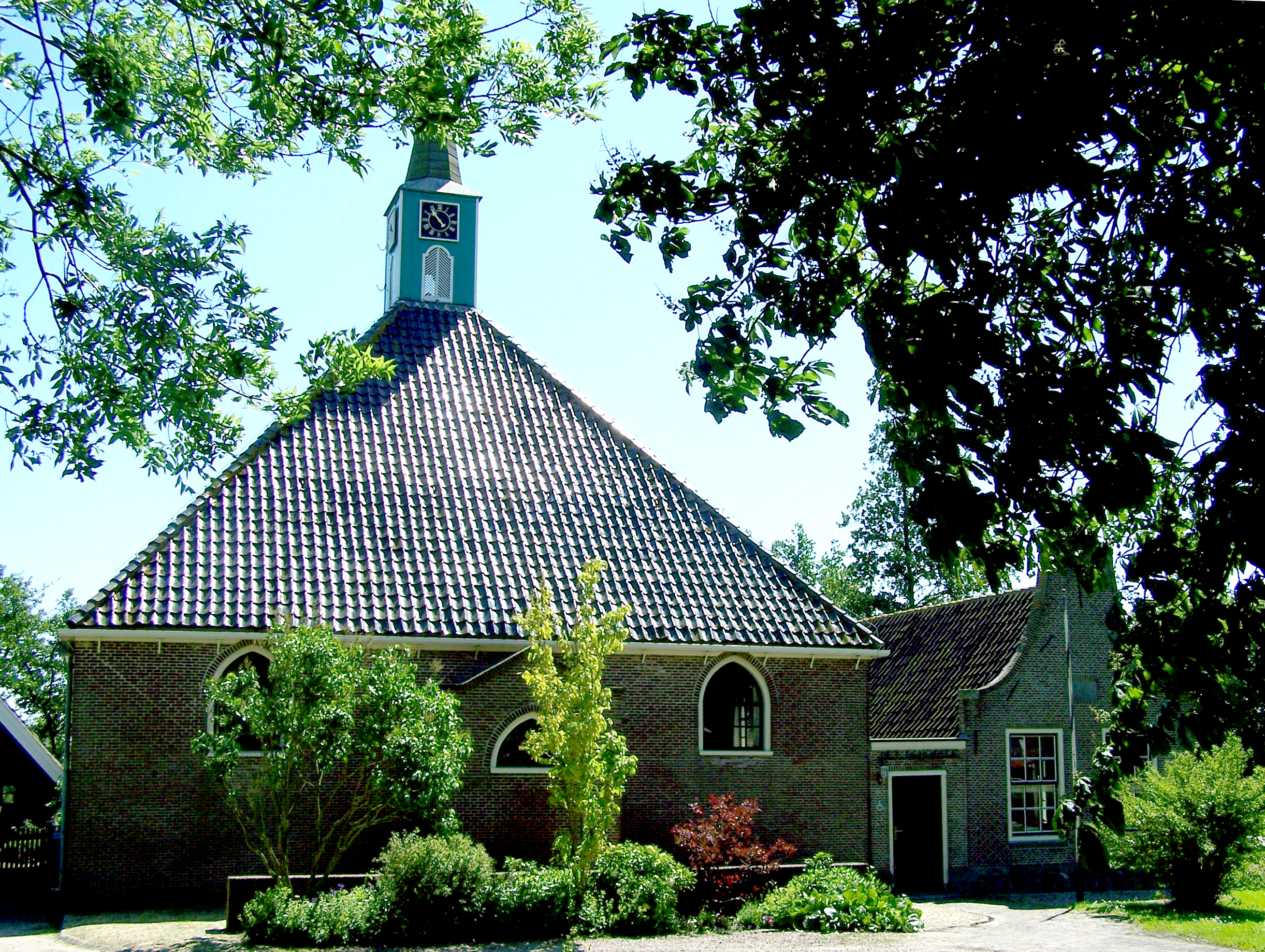
- The little black church

- Location in the Netherlands Location in the province of North Holland in the Netherlands
- Coordinates: 52°35′N 4°47′E
- Country: Netherlands
- Province: North Holland
- Municipality: Alkmaar

Area
  - Total: 17.95 km^{2} (6.93 sq mi)
- Elevation: −2.8 m (−9.2 ft)

Population (2021)
  - Total: 630
  - Density: 35/km^{2} (91/sq mi)
- Time zone: UTC+1 (CET)
  - Summer (DST): UTC+2 (CEST)
- Postal code: 1846
- Dialing code: 072

Zuidschermer is a village in the Dutch province of North Holland. It is a part of the municipality of Alkmaar, and lies about 7 km south of the city of Alkmaar.

== History ==
The village was first mentioned in 1867 as "Zd Schemer (Zwarte kerkje)" and means "southern (part) of the Schermer (polder)". Zuidschermer developed after the Schermer was poldered in 1635 at the intersection of the Zuidervaart with the Driehuizerweg. It started to grow after 1930.

The Dutch Reformed church is better known as Zwarte Kerkje (Little black church). It was constructed out of tarred wood in 1662. In 1831, it was connected with the school. In 1834, the walls were rebuilt in stone. The Catholic St Michaels Church is a three aisled basilica-like church with a needle spire in expressionist style. It was constructed between 1930 and 1931.

The wind mill Poldermolen K is a polder mill from 1635. It was moved to its current location in 1645. Until 1929, it drained the K part of the polder. In 1983, it was restored. In 1987, a little paaltjasker was built near the farm Blockerhoeck.

Zuidschermer was home to 377 people in 1840.

== Gallery ==
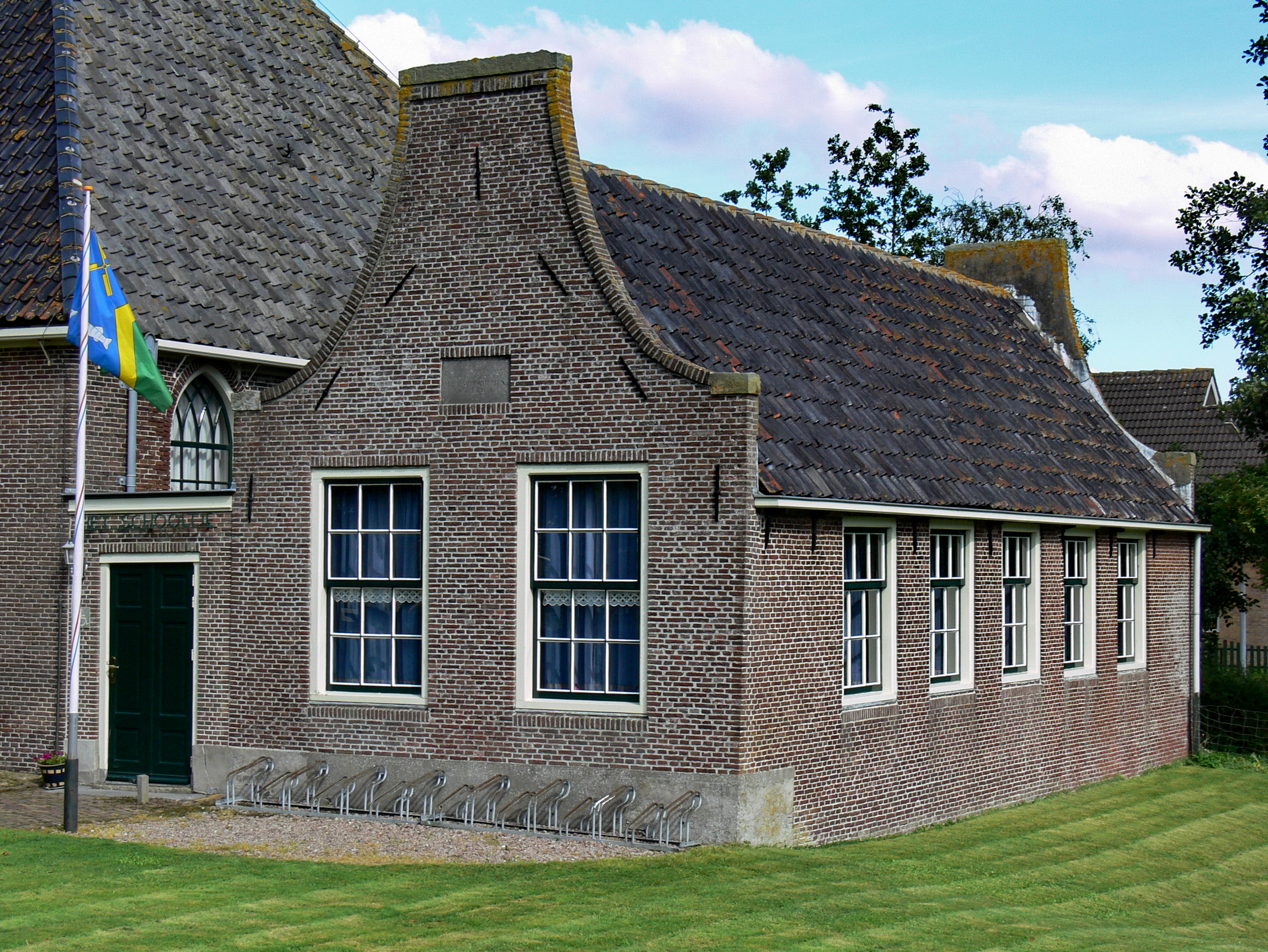
School

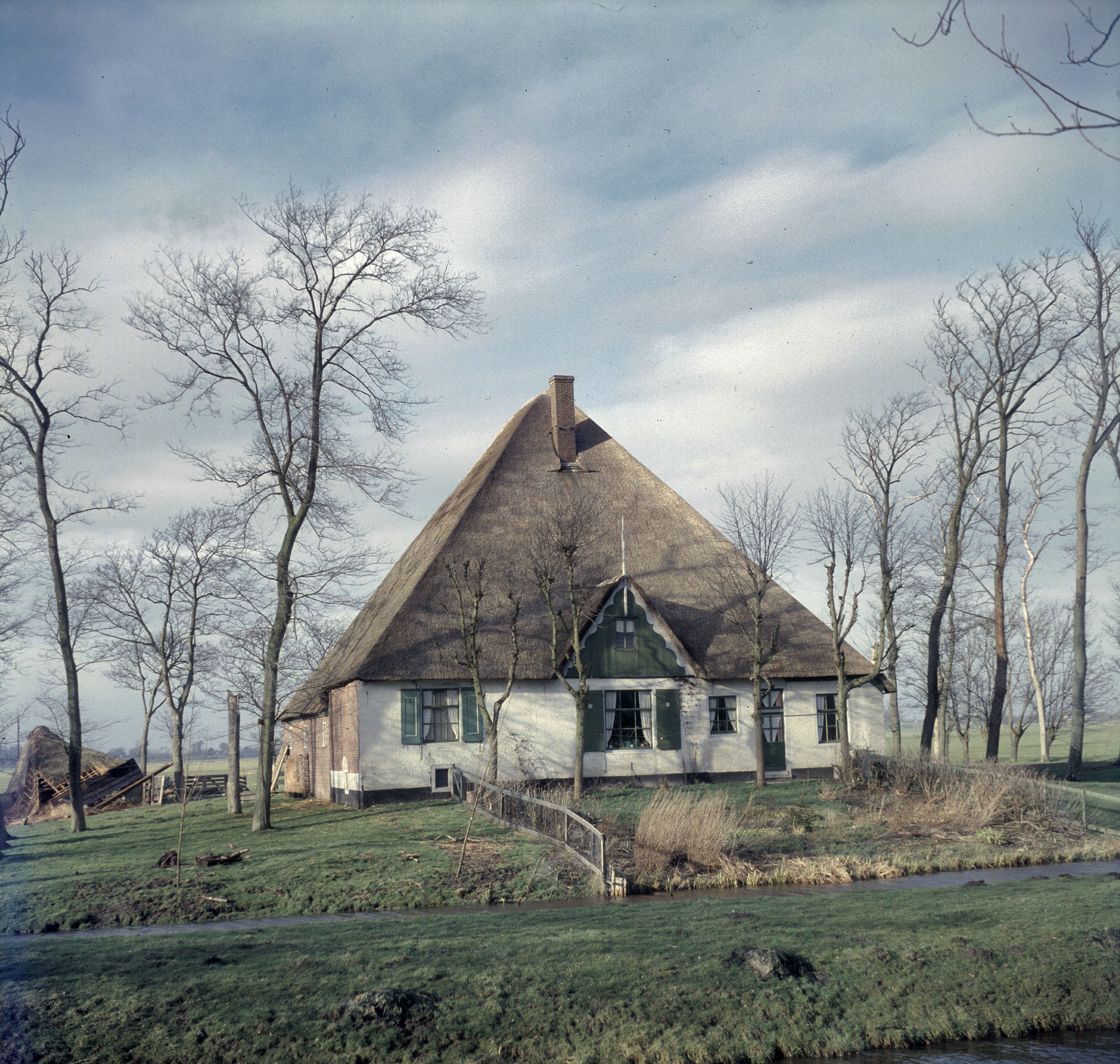
Farm in Zuidschermer

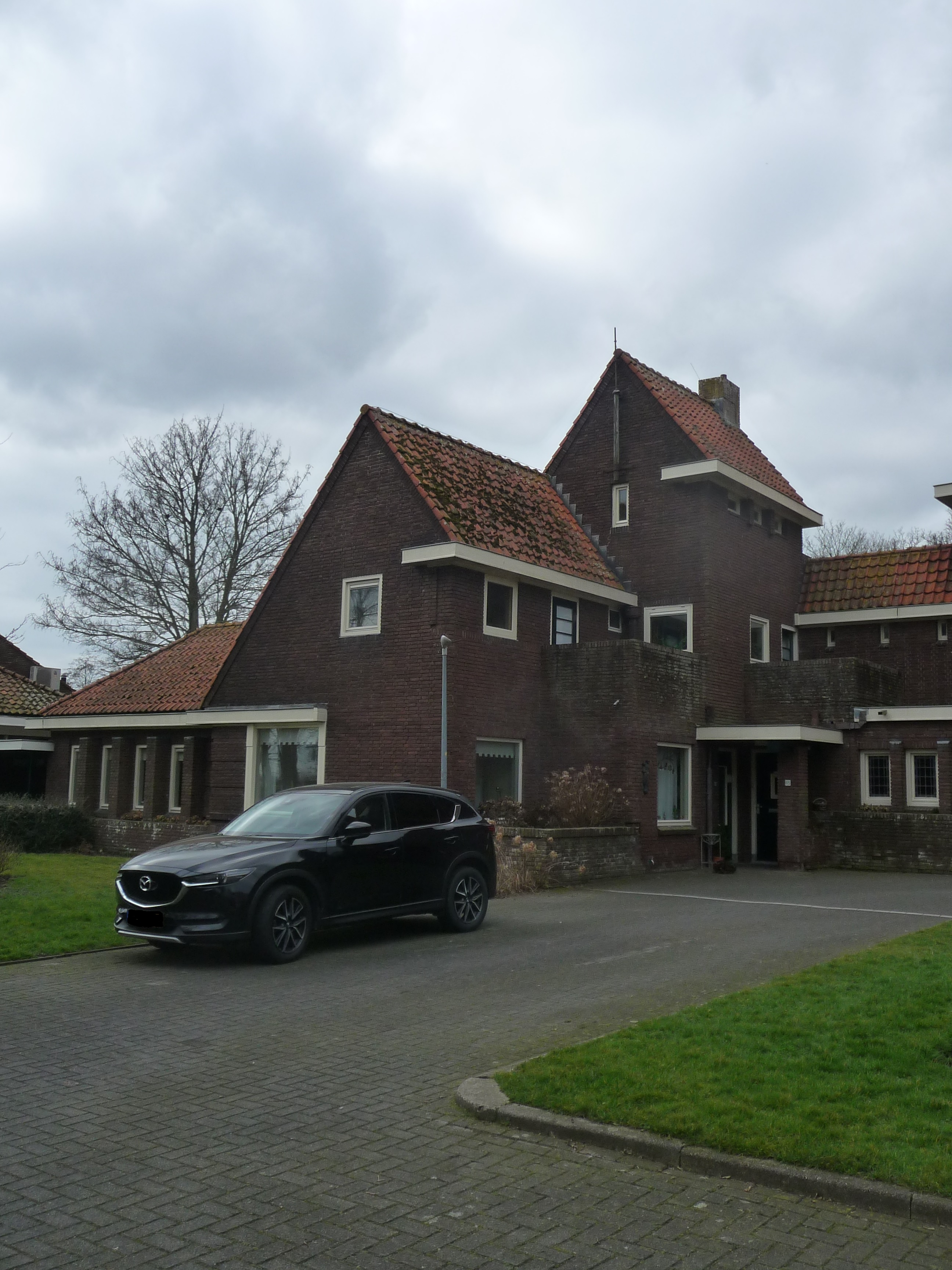
Clergy house

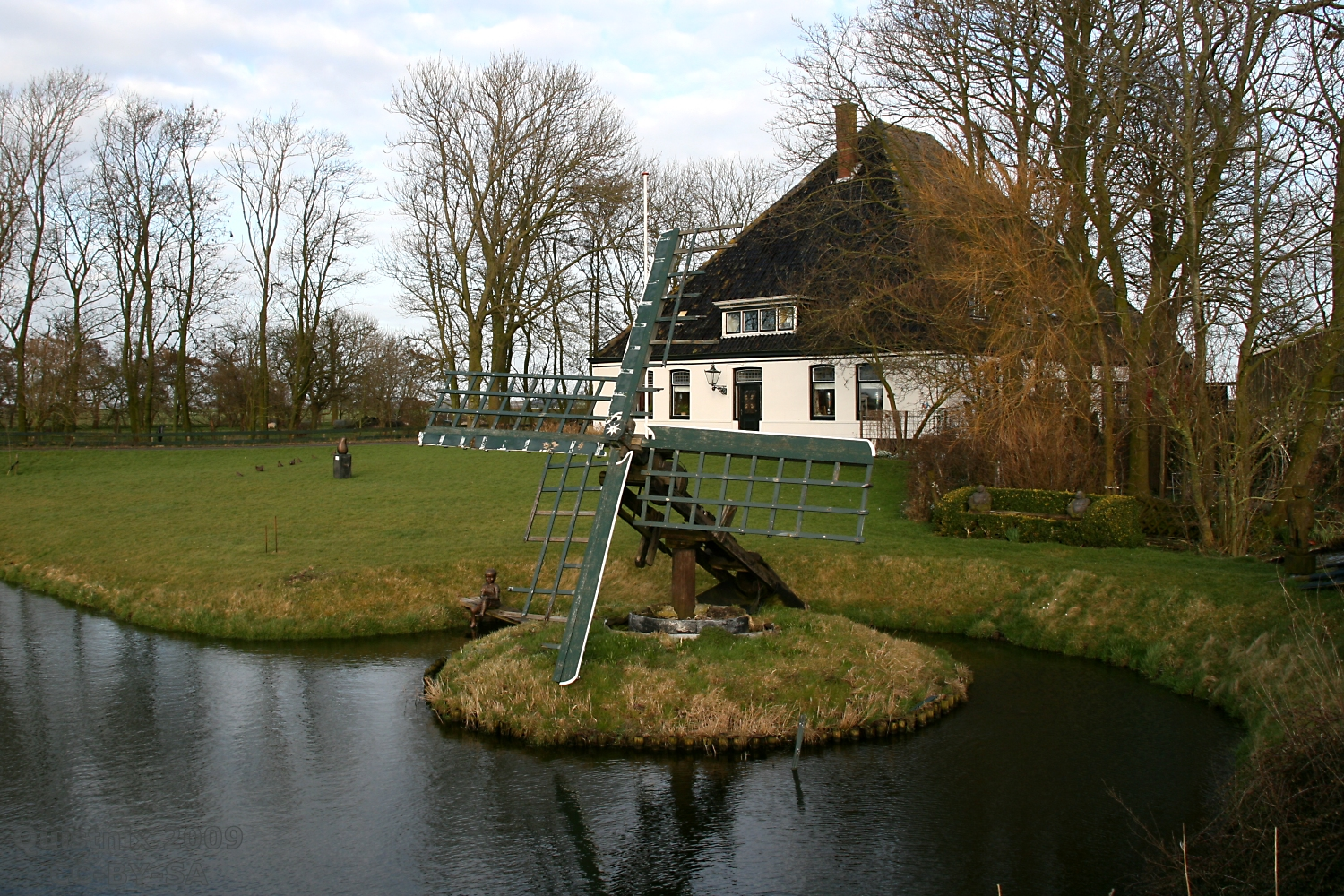
Paaltjasker
