= Grootschermer =

- Village
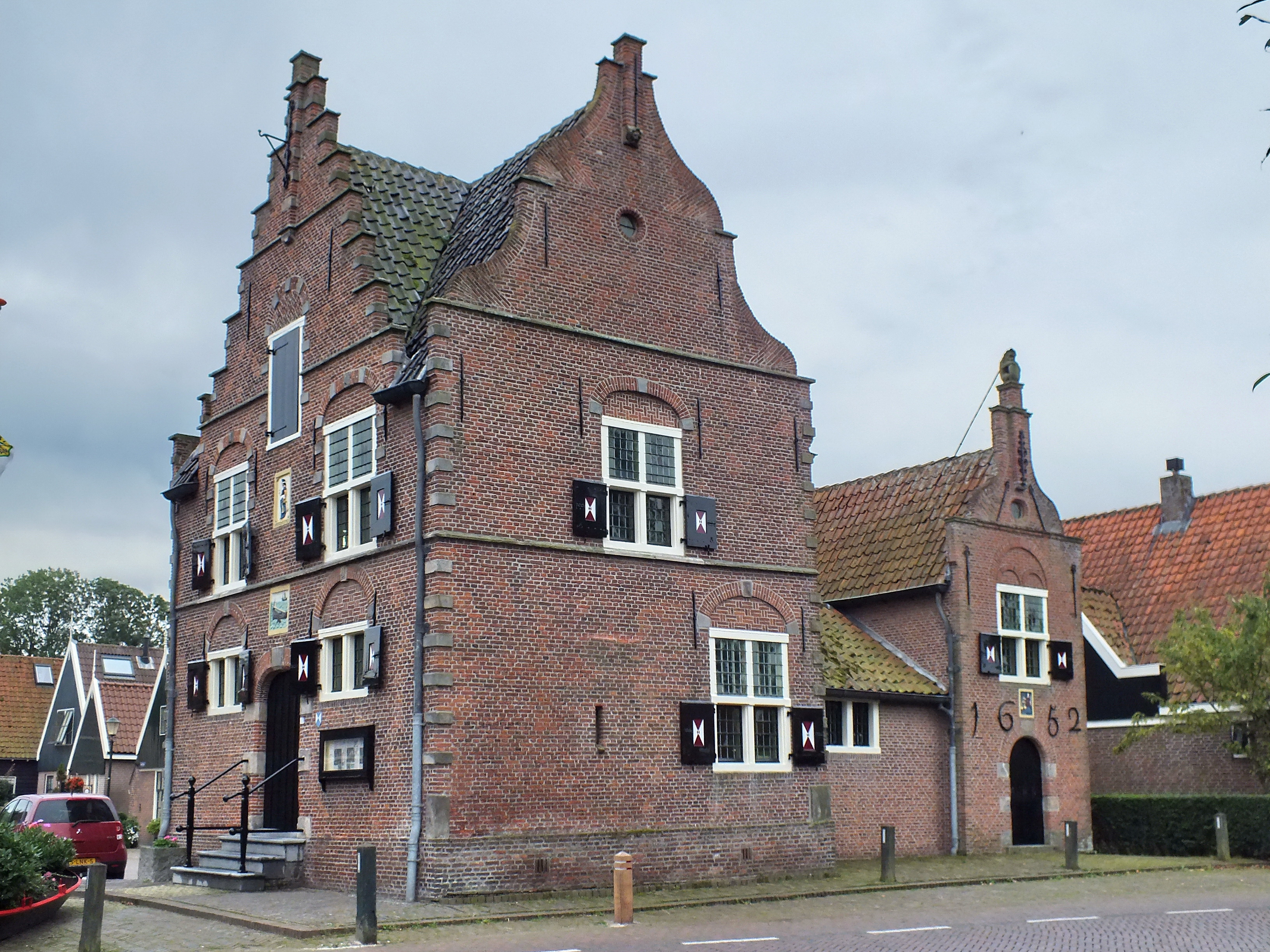
- Former town hall

- Flag Coat of arms

- Location in the Netherlands Location in the province of North Holland in the Netherlands
- Coordinates: 52°35′N 004°51′E
- Country: Netherlands
- Province: North Holland
- Municipality: Alkmaar

Area
  - Total: 11.25 km^{2} (4.34 sq mi)
- Elevation: −2.8 m (−9.2 ft)

Population (2021)
  - Total: 695
  - Density: 61.8/km^{2} (160/sq mi)
- Time zone: UTC+1 (CET)
  - Summer (DST): UTC+2 (CEST)
- Postal code: 1843
- Dialing code: 072

Grootschermer is a village in the Dutch province of North Holland. Since January 1, 2015 it has been a part of the municipality of Alkmaar, and lies about 12 km southeast of the city centre of Alkmaar.

The village was first mentioned in the first half of the 11th century as Skirmere, and means "big white/clear lake". Grootschermer developed in the 13th century when a dike was constructed around the Eilandspolder. It was partially a peat excavation settlement. Until 1811, it consists of two linear settlements.

The Dutch Reformed church is aisleless church with wooden tower which dates from 1762. It was restored between 1978 and 1980. The former town hall is a stepped gable building in mannerist style from 1639. Between 1938 and 1939, the former court house from Noordschermer was added to the back of the building.

Grootschermer was home to 415 people in 1840. It used to be the capital of Zuid- en Noord-Schermer, but was merged into Schermer in 1970. In 2015, it became part of the municipality of Alkmaar.

== Gallery ==
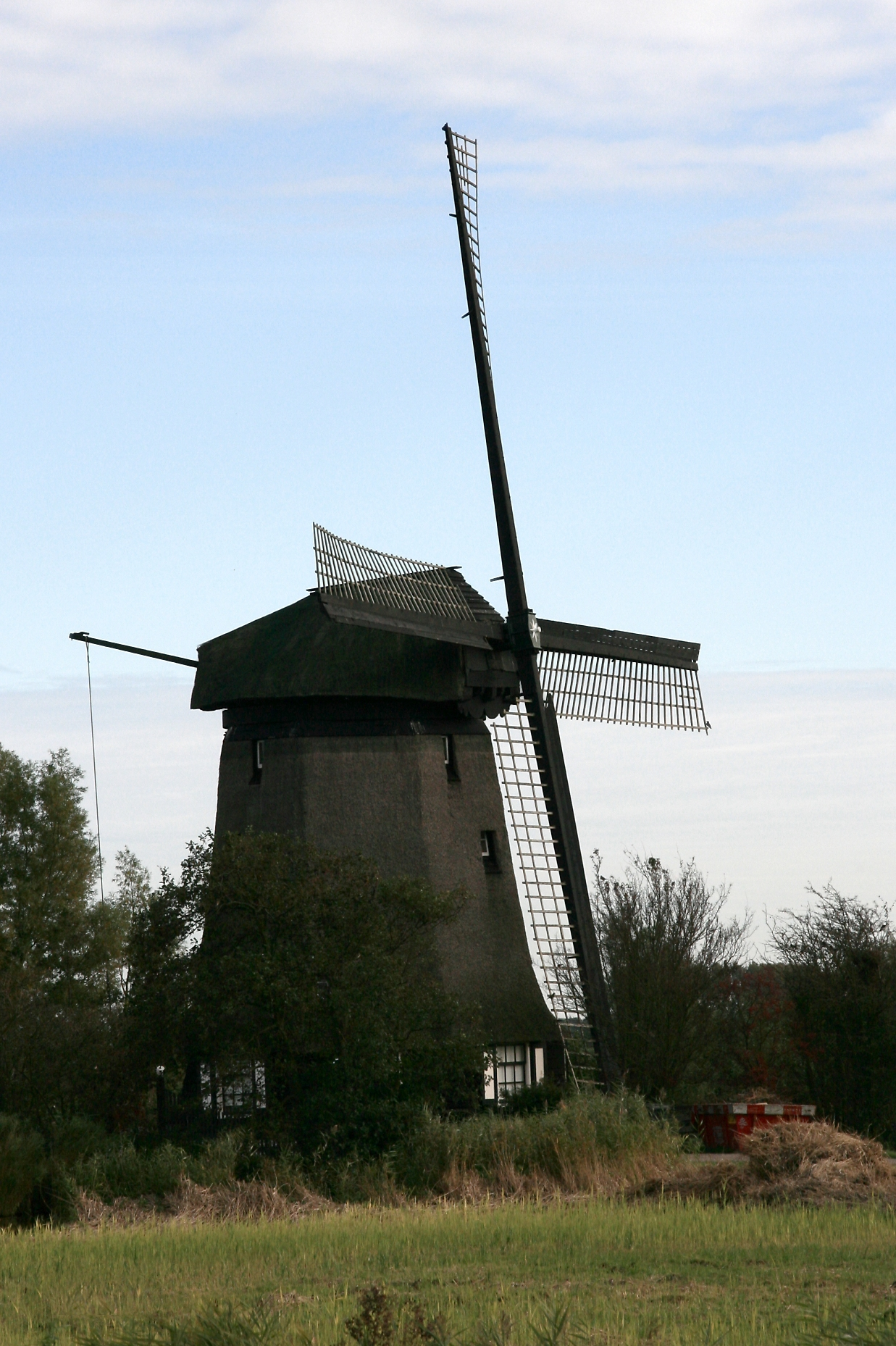
Windmill De Havik

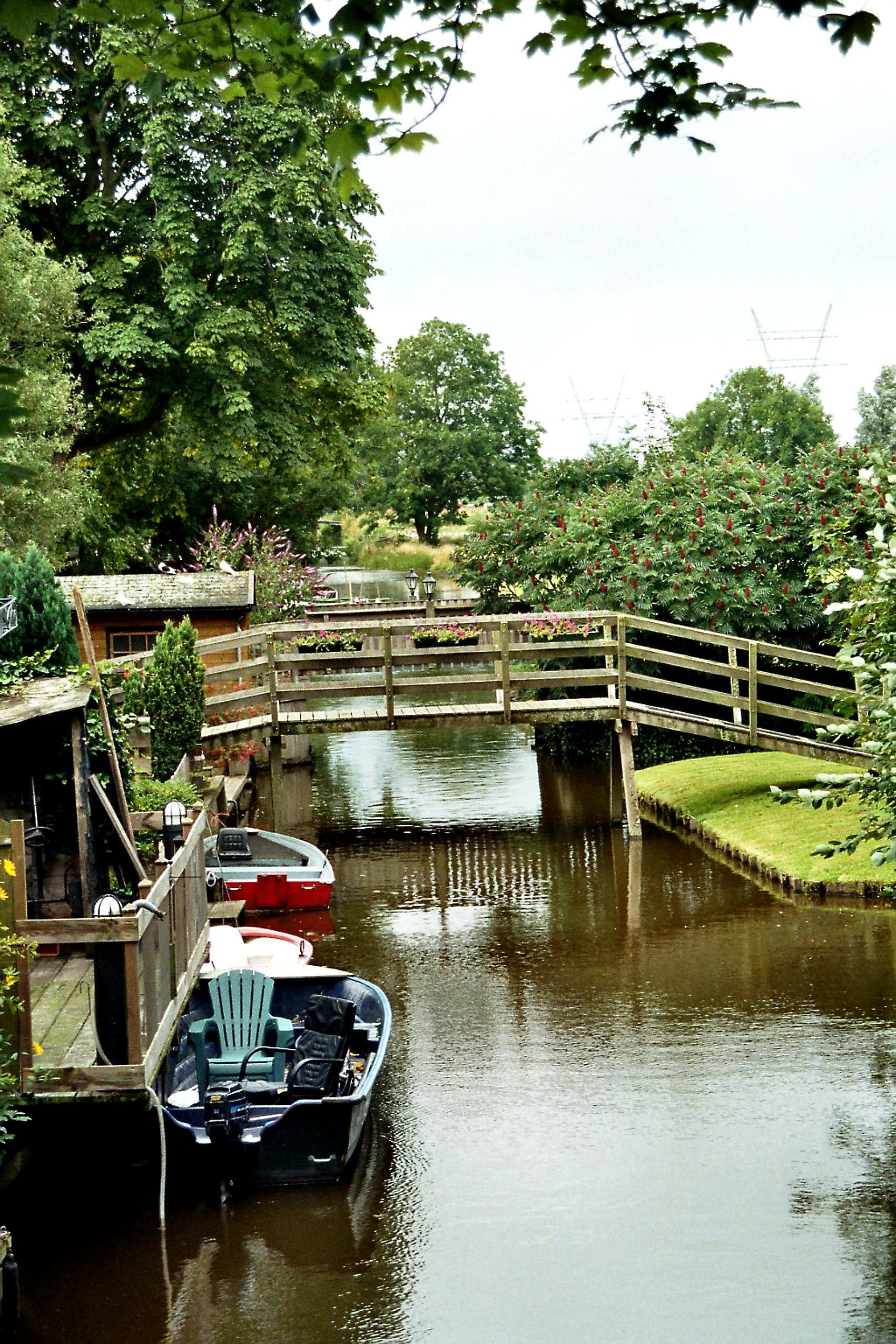
Canal view

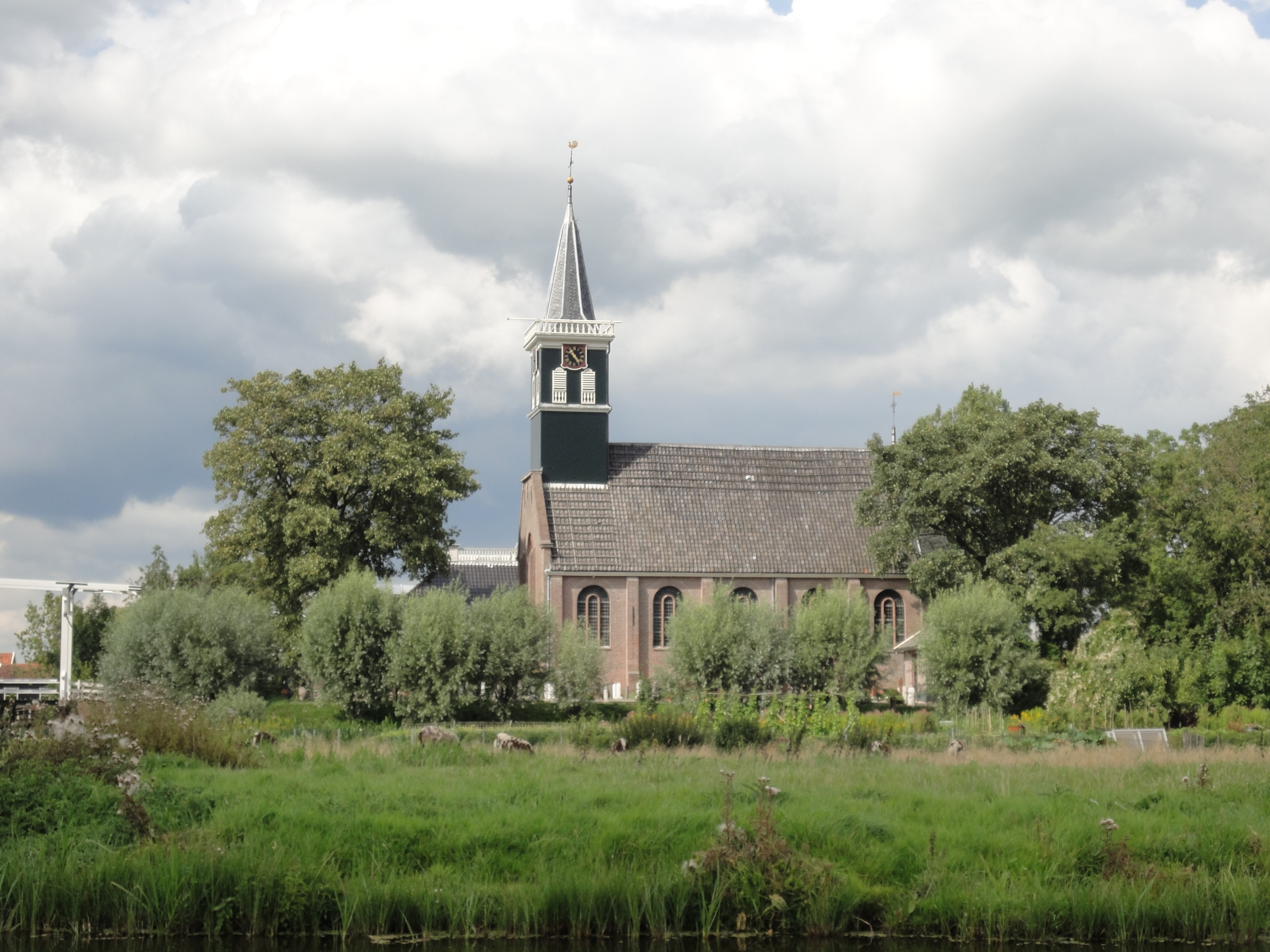
Protestant church

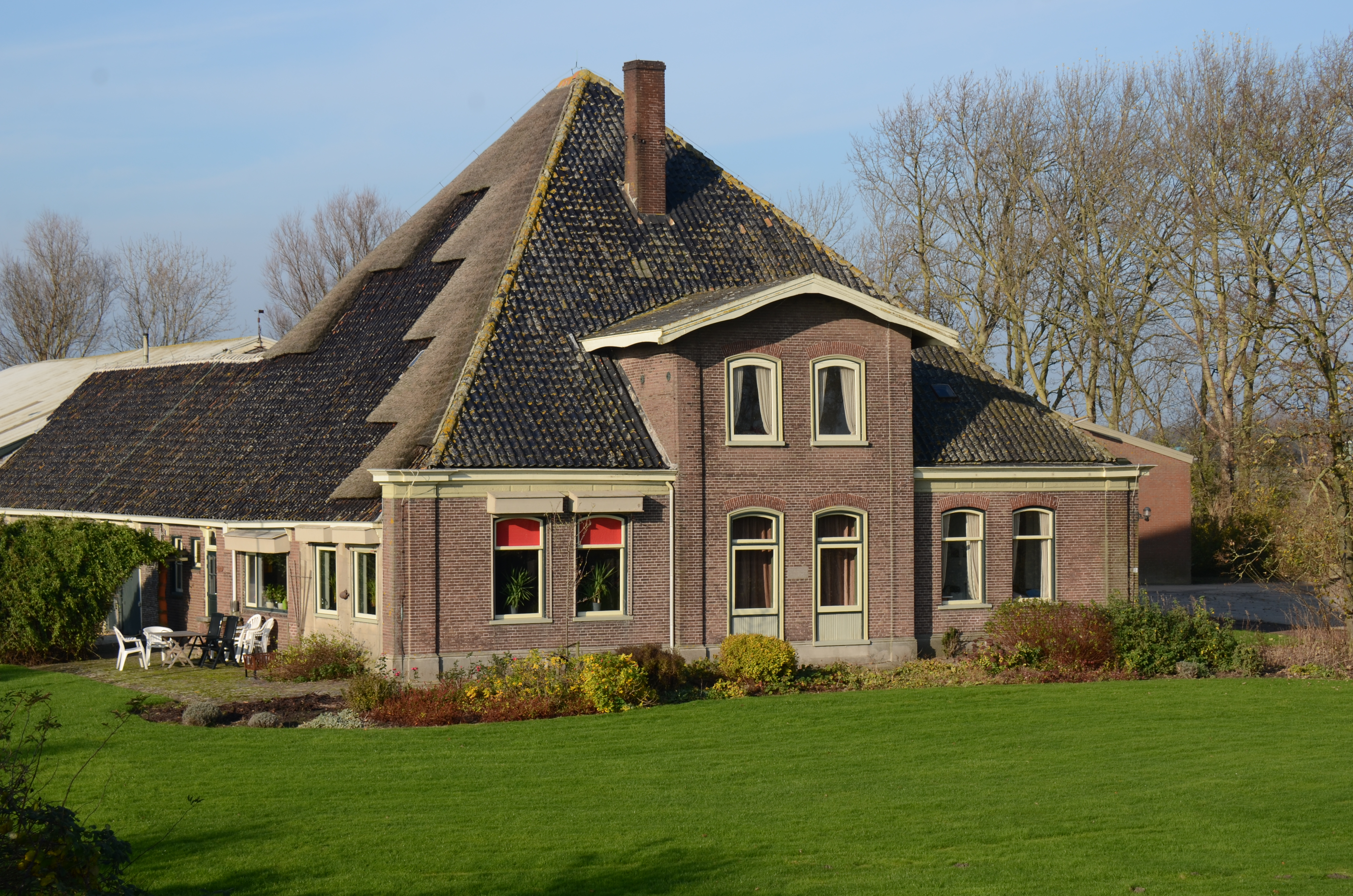
Farm in Grootschermer
