= Schermer =

- Former municipality
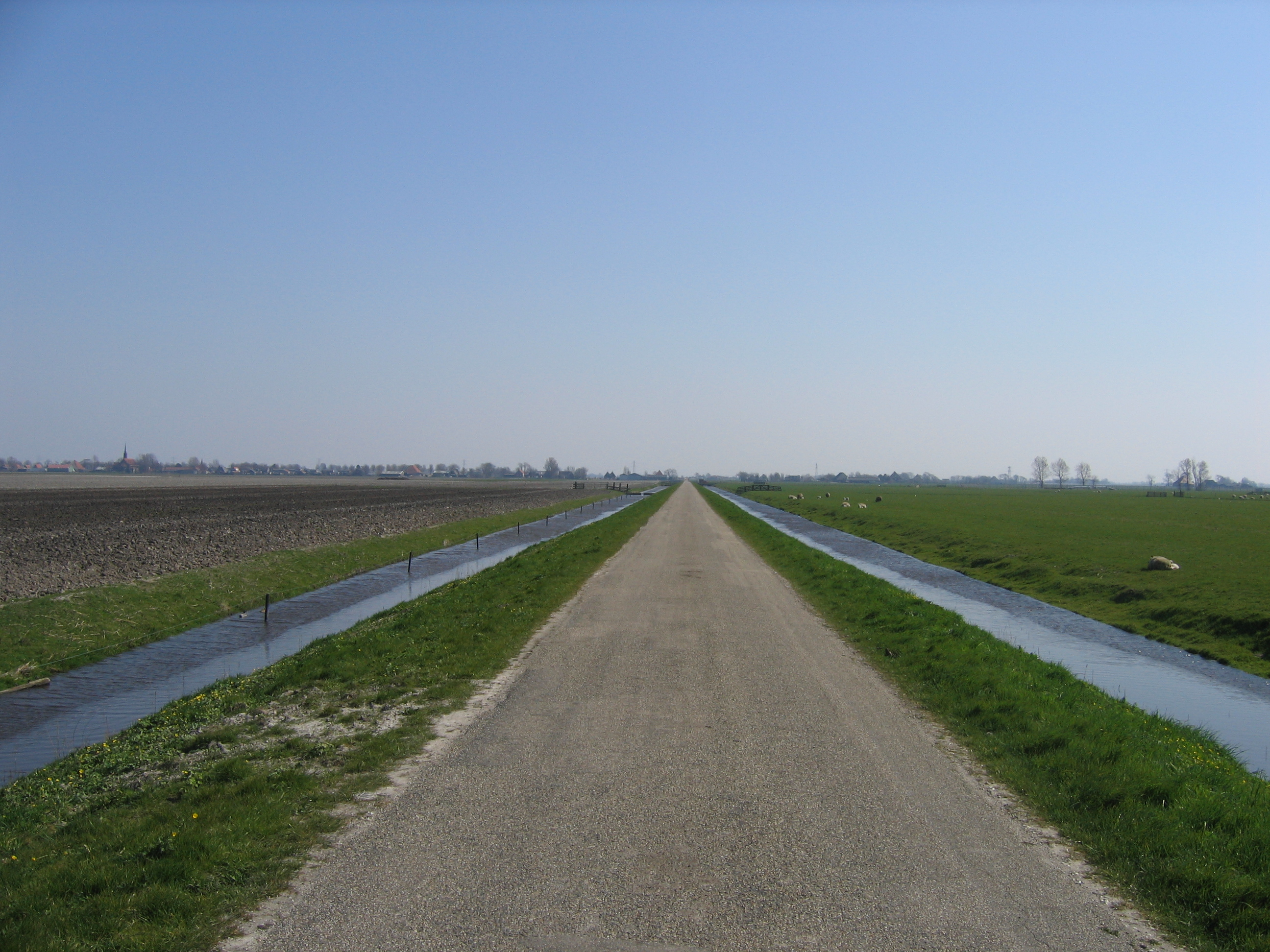
- Polder in Schermer

- Flag Coat of arms

- Location in North Holland
- Coordinates: 52°37′N 4°49′E
- Country: Netherlands
- Province: North Holland
- Municipality: Alkmaar

Area
  - Total: 64.39 km^{2} (24.86 sq mi)
  - Land: 61.39 km^{2} (23.70 sq mi)
  - Water: 3.00 km^{2} (1.16 sq mi)
- Elevation: −3 m (−9.8 ft)

Population (January 2021)
  - Total: data missing
- Time zone: UTC+1 (CET)
  - Summer (DST): UTC+2 (CEST)
- Postcode: 1636, 1840–1847
- Area code: 072
- Website: www.schermer.nl

Schermer (Dutch pronunciation: [ˈsxɛrmər]) is a former municipality in the Netherlands, in the province of North Holland. The name comes from "skir mere", which means "bright lake". Since 2015 it has been a part of the municipality of Alkmaar.

The municipality of Schermer included not only the Schermer polder, but also the polders of Oterleek, Mijzenpolder and Eilandspolder.

== History ==
Around 800 AD, the area that was the municipality of Schermer was covered in peat, and a small river called the Schermer flowed through it. Because of peat-digging and storm floods, this small river had by 1250 developed into an inland lake with an open connection with the Zuyderzee. In the 17th century private investors started draining the largest part of the lake, leaving the southern part, the Alkmaardermeer, intact. In 1635, 47.7 km^{2} (18.4 sq mi) of polder was drained, whereupon the land was divided among the shareholders. In 1970, the village of Zuid- en Noord-Schermer was merged into Schermer.

== Population centres ==
The municipality of Schermer included the following small towns and villages: Driehuizen, Grootschermer, Oterleek, Schermerhorn, Stompetoren, Zuidschermer. The latter two are located in the Schermer polder.

=== Topography ===
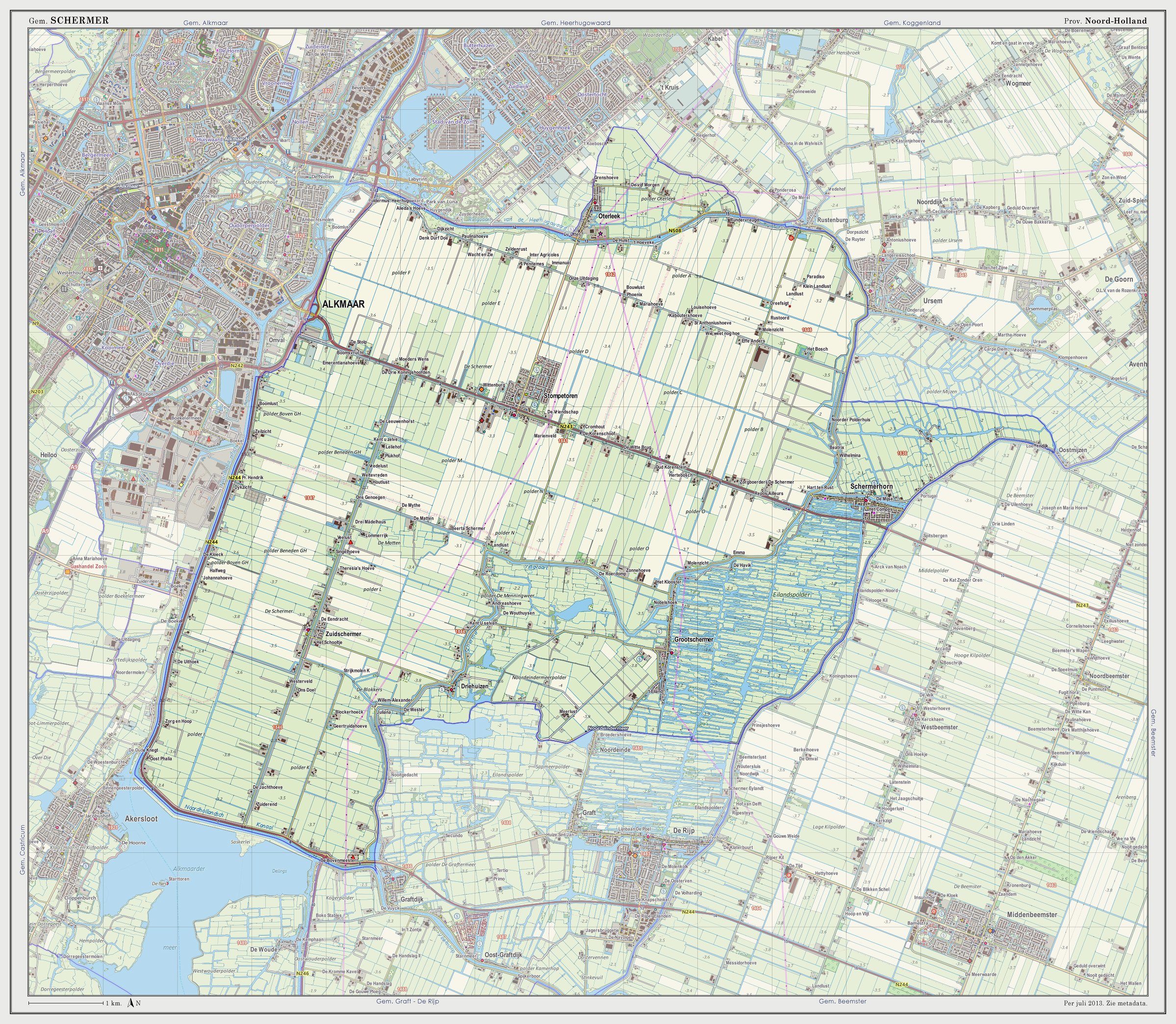
Map of the municipality of Schermer, 2013.

== Local government ==
The municipal council of Schermer consisted of eleven seats, which were divided as follows at the 2010 local elections:

- Schermer Belang - 4 seats
- CDA - 3 seats
- VVD - 2 seats
- PvdA - 2 seats

There was an election in November 2014 for the council of the new merged Alkmaar municipality that commenced work on 1 January 2015, replacing Schermer council.
