= Schermerhorn =

- Village
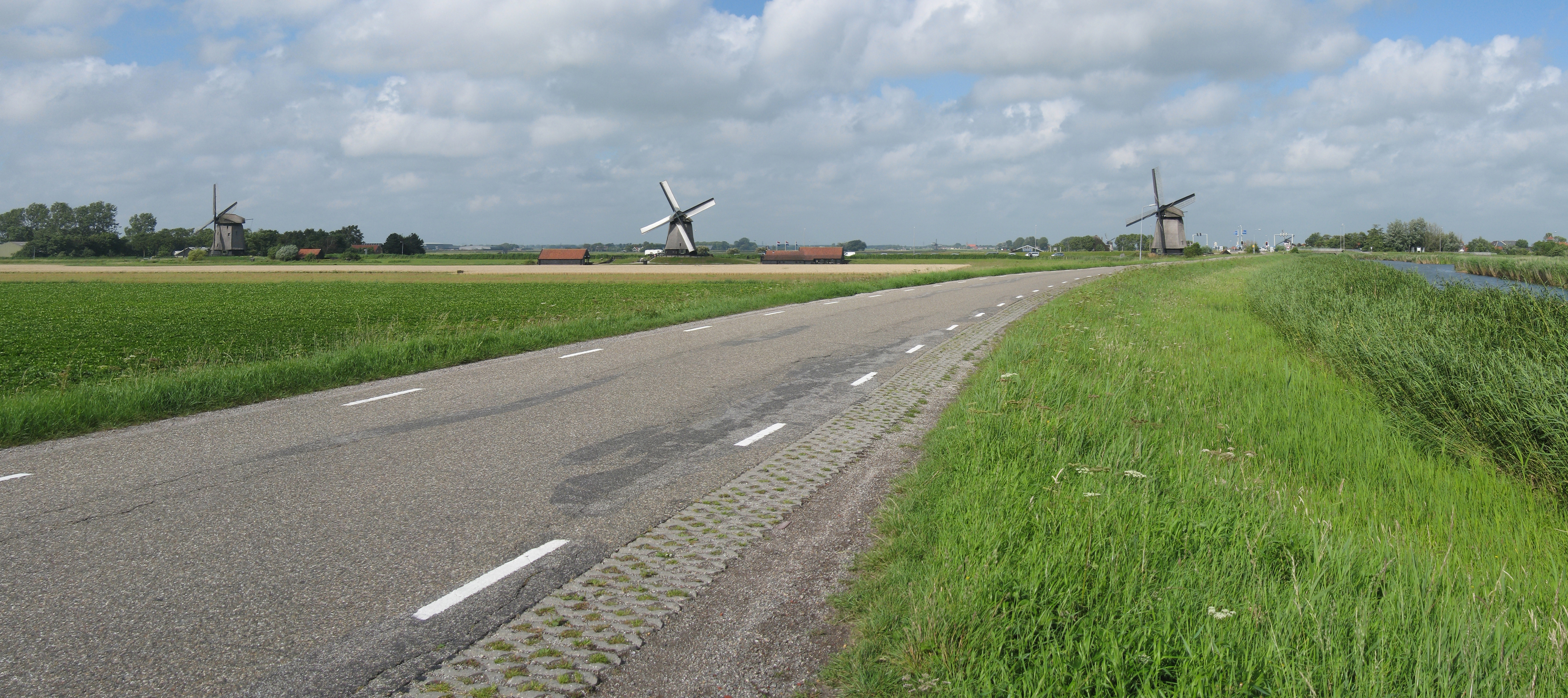

- Flag Coat of arms

- Location in the Netherlands Location in the province of North Holland in the Netherlands
- Coordinates: 52°36′N 4°53′E
- Country: Netherlands
- Province: North Holland
- Municipality: Alkmaar

Area
  - Total: 6.30 km^{2} (2.43 sq mi)
- Elevation: 0.2 m (0.66 ft)

Population (2021)
  - Total: 1,275
  - Density: 202/km^{2} (524/sq mi)
- Time zone: UTC+1 (CET)
  - Summer (DST): UTC+2 (CEST)
- Postal code: 1636
- Dialing code: 072

Schermerhorn (Dutch pronunciation: [ˈsxɛrmərˌɦɔr(ə)n]) is a village in the Dutch province of North Holland. It is a part of the municipality of Alkmaar, and lies about 9 km south of Heerhugowaard.

== History ==
The village was first mentioned in the 14th century as Den Horn, and means "corner (of the dike) in the Schermer (polder)". Schermerhorn developed in the 13th century on the northern corner of the dike surrounding the former island Schermereiland. In 1635, it was connected to the main land and Alkmaar.

The Dutch Reformed church is a three aisled basilica-like church with a slender tower and needle spire. The church was built between 1634 and 1635. There are six polder mills and a wind mill museum in mill D in Schermerhorn. The museum has a glass floor in order to demonstrate the inner workings of a polder mill. In 1928, the pumping station Wilhelmina was built.

Schermerhorn was home to 643 people in 1840. It was a separate municipality until 1970, when it was merged with Schermer. In 2015, it became part of the municipality of Alkmaar.

== Gallery ==
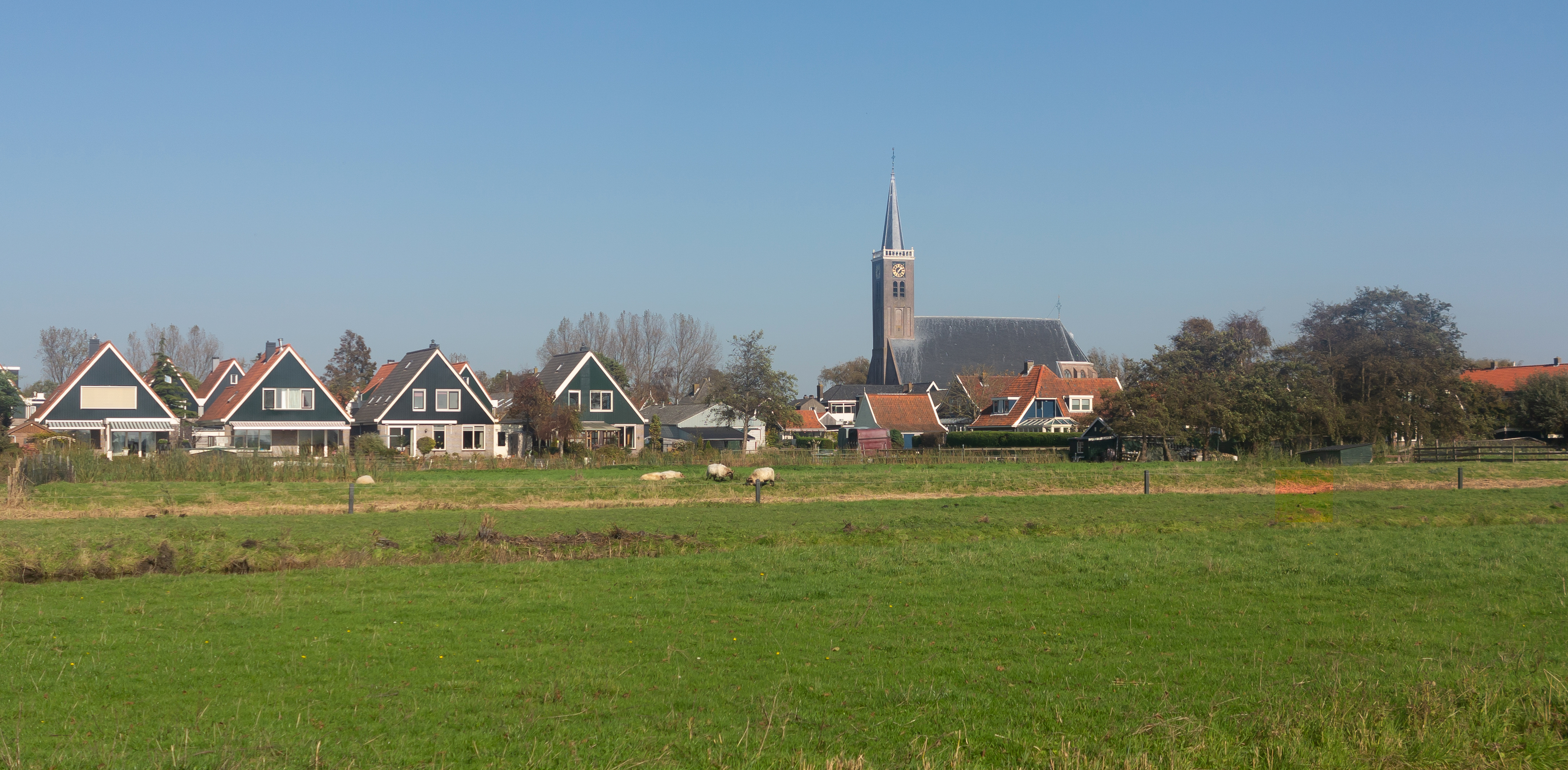
View to the village

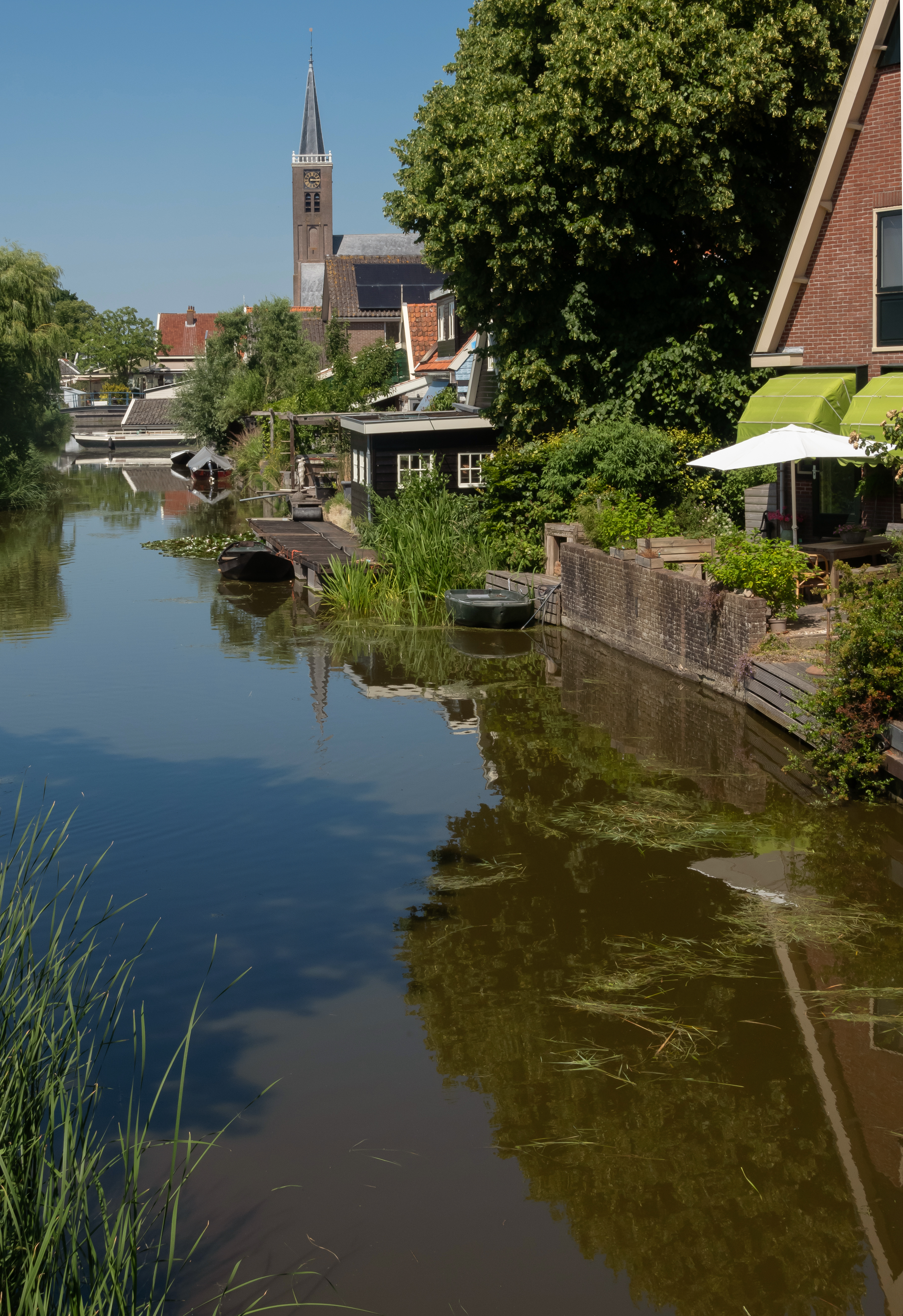
Reformed church with water reflection

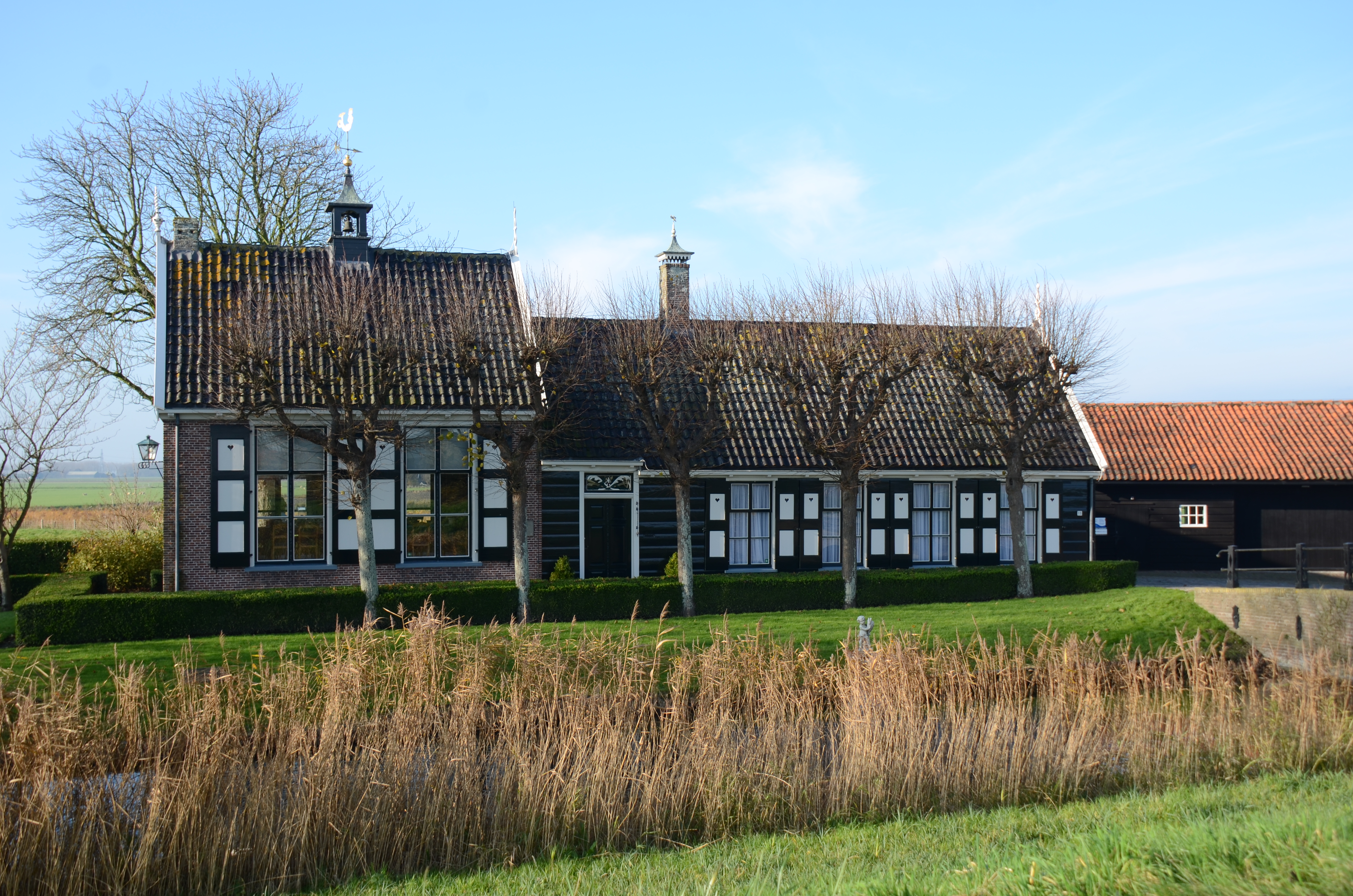
Farm in Schermerhorn

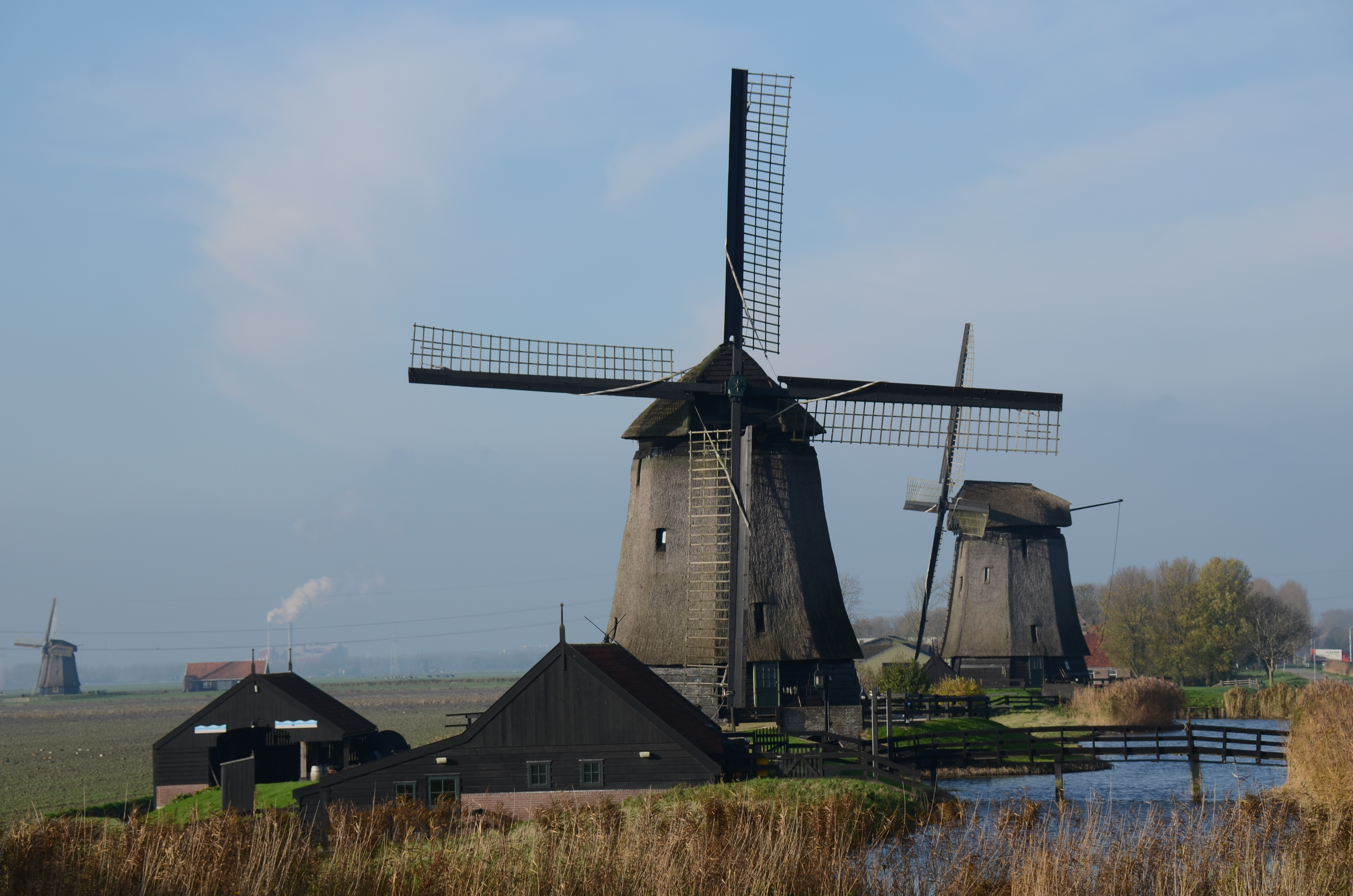
Wind mills
