= Zuid- en Noord-Schermer =

Coordinates: 52°35′17″N 4°49′18″E

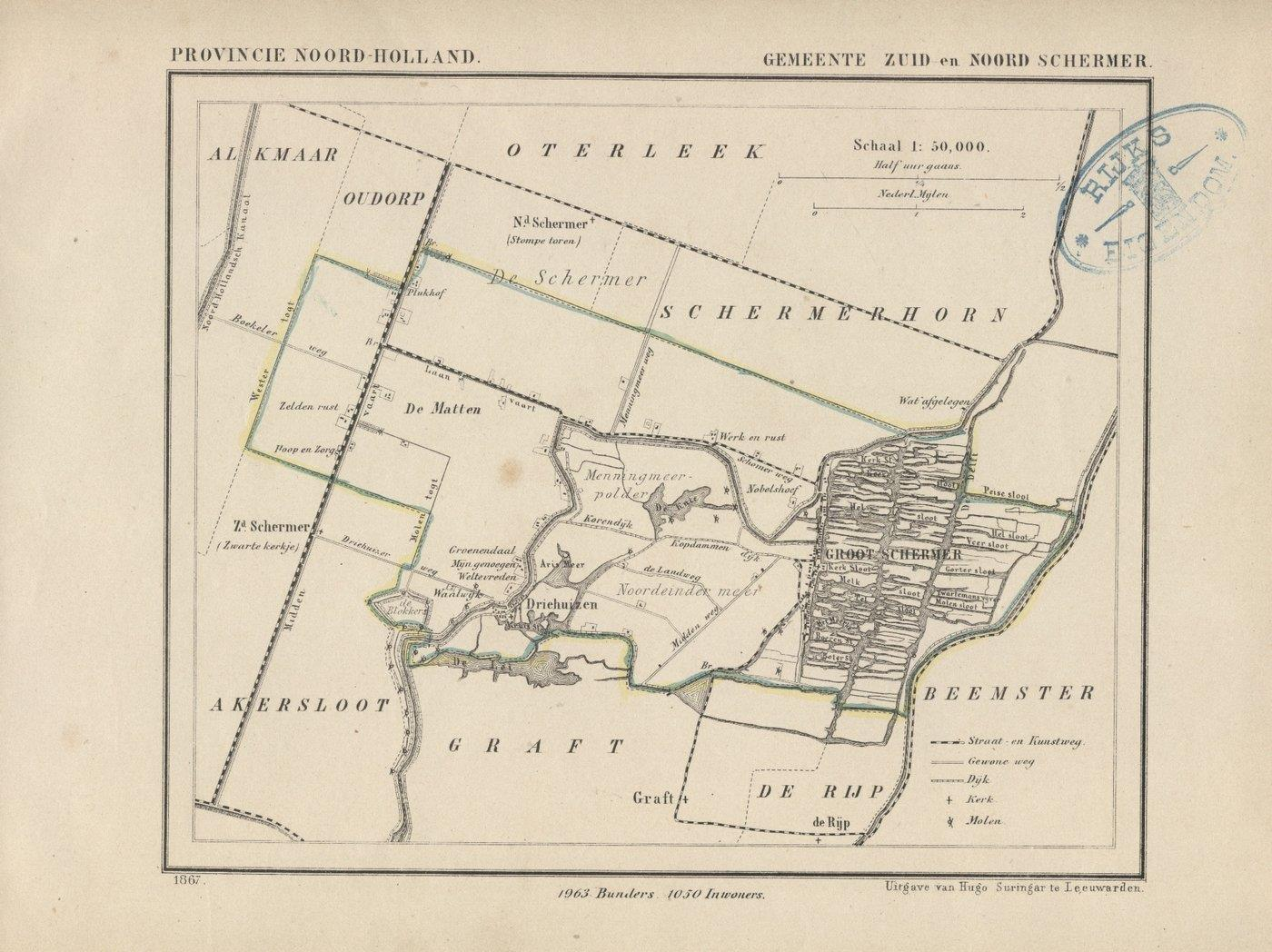
Historic map of Zuid en Noord Schermer, North Holland, the Netherlands

Zuid- en Noord-Schermer is a former municipality in the Dutch province of North Holland. It existed until 1970, when it became a part of the municipality of Schermer.
